= K-26 (Kansas highway) =

State highway in Kansas, U.S.

K-26
- K-26 highlighted in red

Route information
- Maintained by KDOT
- Length: 3.601 mi (5.795 km)
- Existed: 1937–present

Major junctions
- South end: US-166 / US-400 near Baxter Springs
- North end: K-66 in Galena

Location
- Country: United States
- State: Kansas
- Counties: Cherokee

Highway system
- Kansas State Highway System; Interstate; US; State; Spurs
← K-25	→ K-27

K-26 is a 3.601-mile-long (5.795 km) state highway located entirely within Cherokee County, Kansas. It runs from an intersection with U.S. Route 166 (US-166) and US-400 northwest of the Missouri/Kansas/Oklahoma tripoint north to K-66 in Galena. The highway is maintained by the Kansas Department of Transportation (KDOT).

The route was designated in 1937 on a roadway that ran from Crestline to the Missouri state line, but was moved to its current location via a series of route re-designations that took place over the following decades, assuming its current route in the mid-1980s.

== Route description ==
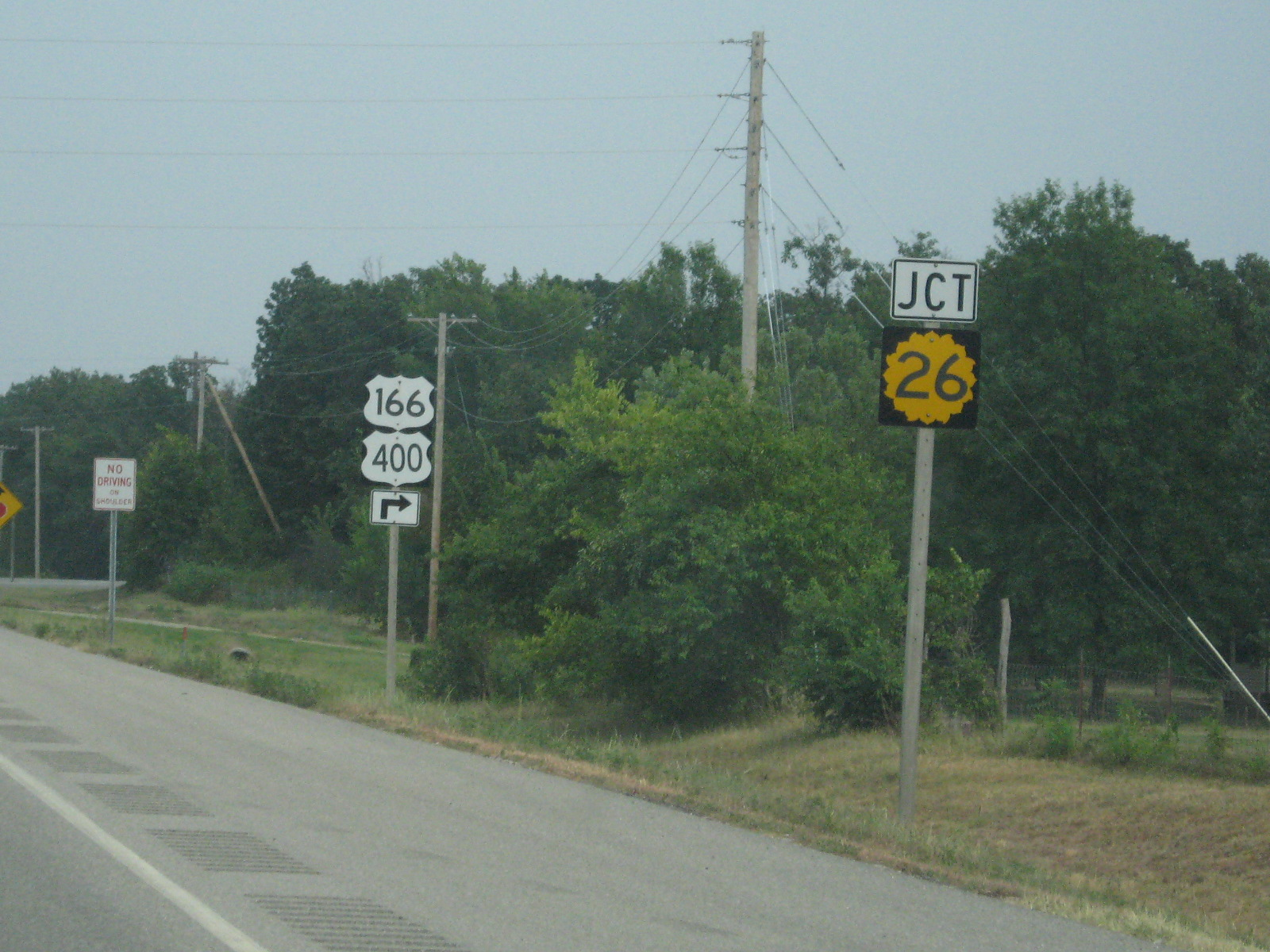
Approaching the junction of K-26 on US 166 and US 400.

K-26 begins at an intersection with US-166 and US-400 east of Baxter Springs. The roadway heads north through a wooded area, passing several farms. The route then crosses Shoal Creek and enters the city of Galena as Main Street. In Galena, K-26 reaches its northern terminus at K-66, which is also known as 7th Street. Main Street continues north of the intersection toward a BNSF Railway line.

The route is maintained by KDOT, which is responsible for constructing and maintaining highways in the state. As part of this role, KDOT regularly surveys traffic on their highways. These surveys are most often presented in the form of annual average daily traffic, which is a measurement of the number of vehicles that use a highway during an average day of the year. In 2010, KDOT calculated that a total of 3230 vehicles used the road daily, including 225 trucks. No part of the highway has been listed as part of the National Highway System, a network of roads important to the nation's defense, mobility, and economy.

== History ==
K-26 was first designated in 1937 over the former eastern segment of K-34, a gravel road that ran from K-96 and US-69 in Crestline east to the Missouri state line. In 1941, K-26 and the easternmost portion of K-96 switch designations. After this, K-26 ran from US-66 west of Galena north to K-96 and US-69. This roadway was paved when K-26 was designated along it. Between 1948 and 1953, the highway was extended east along US-66 to Galena and south from there to its current southern terminus at US-166. In the mid-1980s when US-66 was decommissioned, the portion of K-26 along it was re-signed as K-66 and the portion of the highway from US-66 to Crestline was designated as part of U.S. Route 69 Alternate (US-69 Alt). The original K-26 was designated in 1927 from US-81 to the Oklahoma State Line. In 1932, it became part of US 177.

== Major intersections ==
The entire route is in Cherokee County.

Location	mi	km	Destinations	Notes
Garden Township	0.000	0.000	US-166 / US-400 – Baxter Springs	Southern terminus
Galena	3.601	5.795	K-66 (7th Street) / Historic US 66 (Main street north)	Northern terminus; former US-66 west; road continues north as Main Street (former US-66 east)
1.000 mi = 1.609 km; 1.000 km = 0.621 mi
