= Cherokee Neosho Crawford League =

High school athletics conference in Kansas, US

The Cherokee-Neosho-Crawford (CNC) League is a high school athletics conference comprising seven high school athletic teams in southeastern Kansas, one parochial Catholic school and six public schools.

== Member schools ==
Location	School	Mascot	Colors
Baxter Springs, Kansas	Baxter Springs	Lions	
Columbus, Kansas	Columbus	Titans	
Frontenac, Kansas	Frontenac	Raiders	
Galena, Kansas	Galena	Bulldogs	
Girard, Kansas	Girard	Trojans	
Pittsburg, Kansas	St. Mary's Colgan	Panthers	
Riverton, Kansas	Riverton	Rams	
