= Kanotex Refining Company =

Former American oil company

- Industry: petroleum refining and distribution
- Predecessor: Superior Refining Company
- Founded: 1909
- Defunct: October 1953
- Fate: Sold to APCO
- Successor: Anderson-Prichard Oil Corporation
- Headquarters: Arkansas City, Kansas, United States
- Area served: Kansas, Oklahoma, Texas, Missouri

The Kanotex Refining Company (reporting mark: KOTX), a regional oil refinery and gasoline distributor, began operation in Caney, Kansas, in 1909, a successor to the Superior Refining Company. The company's logo was a Kansas sunflower behind a five-point star; the Kan-O-Tex name referred to Kansas, Oklahoma and Texas as the states in which the company originally marketed its products.

== History ==
John McEwen Ames became the company's president in 1915 and established a main refinery in Arkansas City, Kansas, in 1917 which would become the base of the company's operations. While the initial market was Kansas, Oklahoma and Texas, Meyer Brothers Gas Station & General Store in Orchard Farm, Missouri, sold Kan-O-Tex fuel in the late 1920s; by 1930, Kan-O-Tex products were advertised locally in St. Joseph, Missouri, by the Home Oil and Gas Corporation, a chain of nineteen filling stations.

The Kan-O-Tex brand and reporting mark were acquired by the now-defunct Anderson-Prichard Oil Corporation of Oklahoma City, Oklahoma, in October 1953 and are no longer in use.

One Kan-O-Tex Service Station, the former Little's Service Station on U.S. Route 66 in Galena, Kansas, was restored in 2007 as a diner and souvenir shop as part of wider efforts to rebuild and market the historic U.S. Route 66 as a tourism destination.
