= U.S. Route 66 in Kansas =

Historic highway in Kansas

U.S. Highway 66
- Will Rogers Highway
- US 66 highlighted in gray on a modern map

Route information
- Maintained by KDOT
- Length: 11.274 mi (18.144 km)
- Existed: November 11, 1926–June 26, 1985

Major junctions
- West end: US 66 at the Oklahoma state line near Baxter Springs
- US-166 in Baxter Springs; K-26 from Riverton to Galena
- East end: US 66 at the Missouri state line

Location
- Country: United States
- State: Kansas
- Counties: Cherokee

Highway system
- United States Numbered Highway System; List; Special; Divided; Kansas State Highway System; Interstate; US; State; Spurs
← K-65	→ K-66

U.S. Route 66 (US 66, Route 66) was a U.S. highway in southeastern Cherokee County, Kansas. It entered the state south of Baxter Springs and continued north until it crossed Brush Creek, from where it turned east and left the state in Galena. After the decertification of the highway in 1985, this road segment was numbered as US 69 (alternate) from Quapaw, Oklahoma north to Riverton, Kansas and as K-66 (Kansas highway) from Riverton east to Route 66 in Missouri.

== History ==
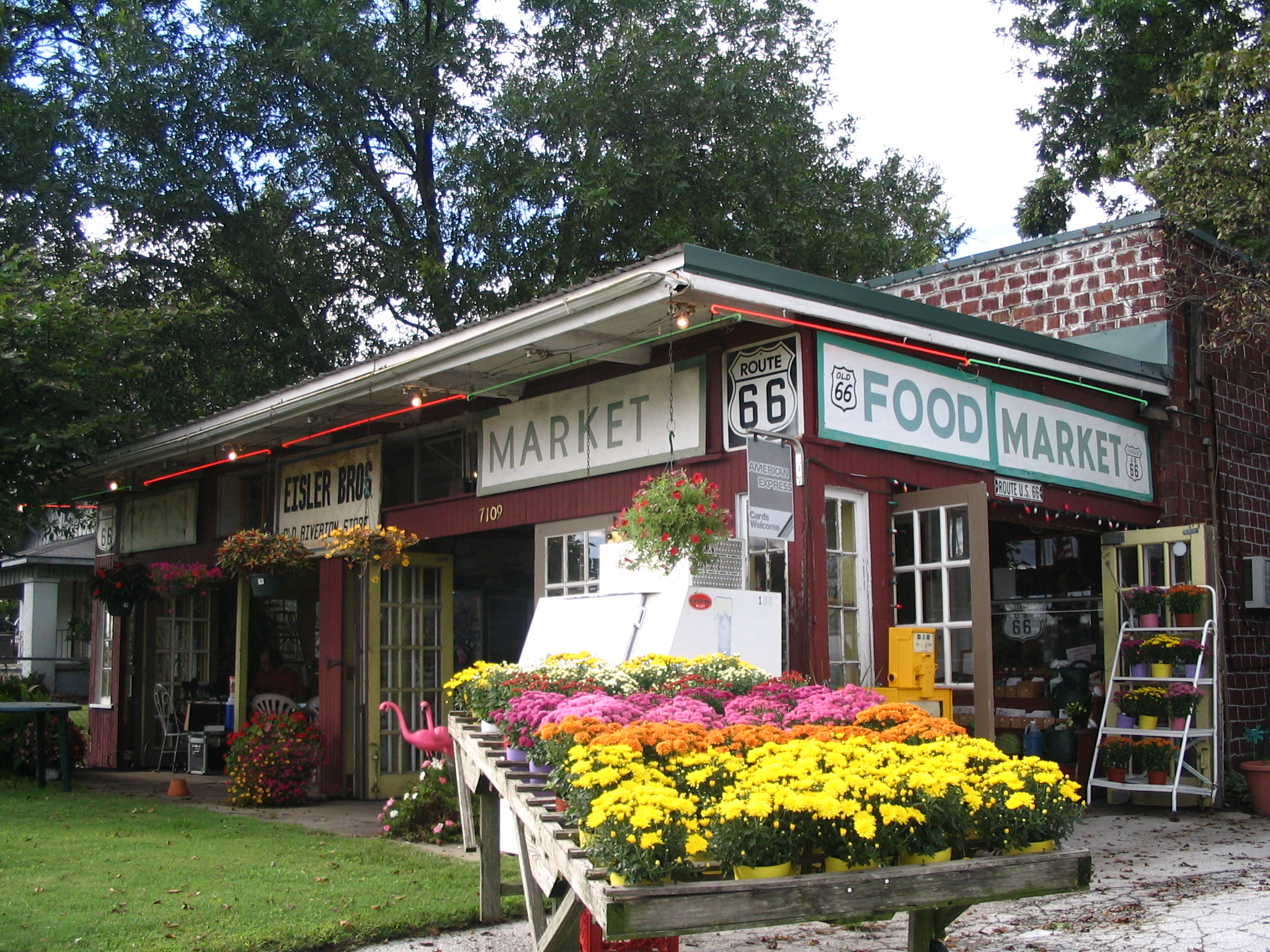
Eisler Brothers store in Riverton

The 13.2 miles of US 66 in Kansas retains much of the character of the Mother Road. It passes through Baxter Springs, Riverton and Galena in Cherokee County.

The entirety of US 66 through Kansas was paved in 1929, becoming the first state to do so.

In Galena, US 66 originally turned north on Main Street, then east on Front Street before leaving the state as Route 66 to Central City, Missouri. This portion was changed in 1979 to remain on 7th Avenue, seven blocks south of the original routing, eastward to the Missouri state line.

When US 66 was bypassed by Interstate 44 (I-44) in 1961, the new Interstate highway crossed directly from Oklahoma to Missouri, bypassing Kansas entirely by just a quarter mile (400 m). US-69 Alternate was formed in 1985 when US-66 was decommissioned; the remainder of US-66 in Kansas became K-66. The final (1985) alignment of US 66 therefore perfectly matches present US 69 Alternate and K-66.

== Route description ==
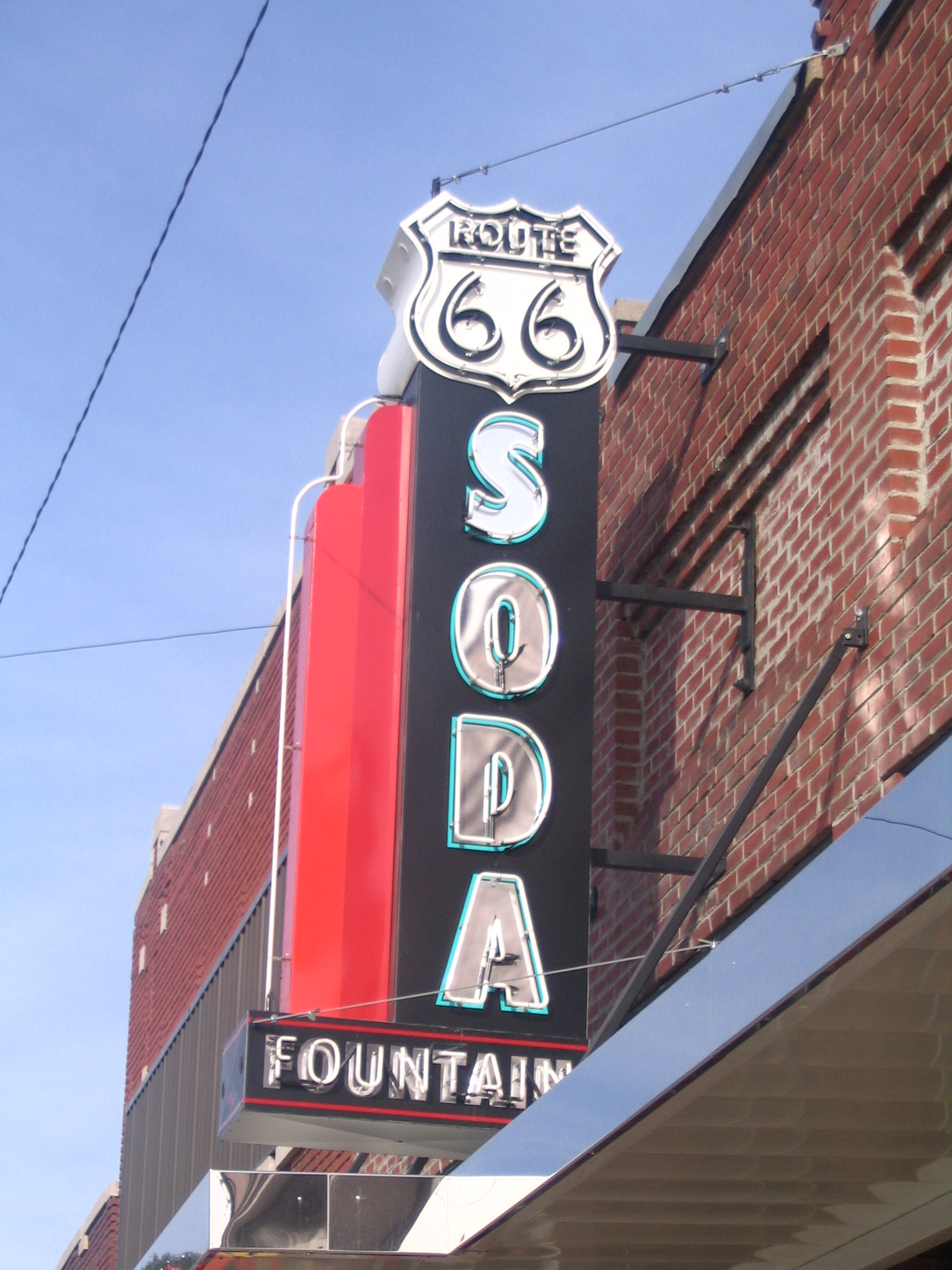
Soda fountain on Main Street in Baxter Springs named for Route 66.

Coming from the west, US 66 entered Kansas from Oklahoma, concurrent with US 69 Alternate, also called Military Avenue. From the state line, the highway ran north through Baxter Springs. At the intersection of US 66 with West 30th Street, the highway originally traveled east onto West 30th Street and then north onto Roberts Road to get back to Military Avenue. In 1933 this changed and US 66 ran over the curve on the inside of the intersection of West 30th Street with Roberts Road. In the 1960s this changed again and the road would simply continue on Military Avenue.

In the northern part of Baxter Springs, US 66 originally turned West at the intersection of Military Avenue with 3rd Street. It followed this road as it curved to the north and became Willow Avenue, and later changed name again to 50th Street. Continuing north the route crossed over Brush Creek, just right from the Marsh arch Rainbow Bridge, which was originally used to cross it. The route continued northeast and as it became Beasley Road it turned east to get back to US 69 Alternate, also known as US 400 here, at the intersection with K-66. In the 1960s, the route changed and ran straight from Baxter Spring over US 69 Alternate to this intersection. Both alignments continued east onto K-66 passing through Riverton and crossing over the Spring River to get to Galena near the state line with Missouri.

US 66 enters Galena in the east over K-66. The first alignment, which was used from the commissioning in 1926 until the 1940s, followed Main Street to the north at the intersection of K-66 with Main Street, known as K-26 to the south. It would then turn east onto Front Street, crossing a viaduct over railroad tracks and entering Missouri shortly after. This alignment changed in the 1940s, as US-66 ran straight across Main Street and continue east on K-66 and enter Missouri a little bit more to the south.

== Major intersections ==
The entire route was in Cherokee County.

Location	mi	km	Destinations	Notes
Spring Valley Township			US 66 west – Miami, Tulsa	Oklahoma state line
Baxter Springs			US-166 (12th Street) – Chetopa	
Riverton			K-26 north (Southeast 70th Street) – Pittsburg	west end of K-26 overlap
Galena			K-26 south (Main Street)	east end of K-26 overlap
Galena			US 66 east – Joplin, Saint Louis	Missouri state line
1.000 mi = 1.609 km; 1.000 km = 0.621 mi: Concurrency terminus

== Structures ==
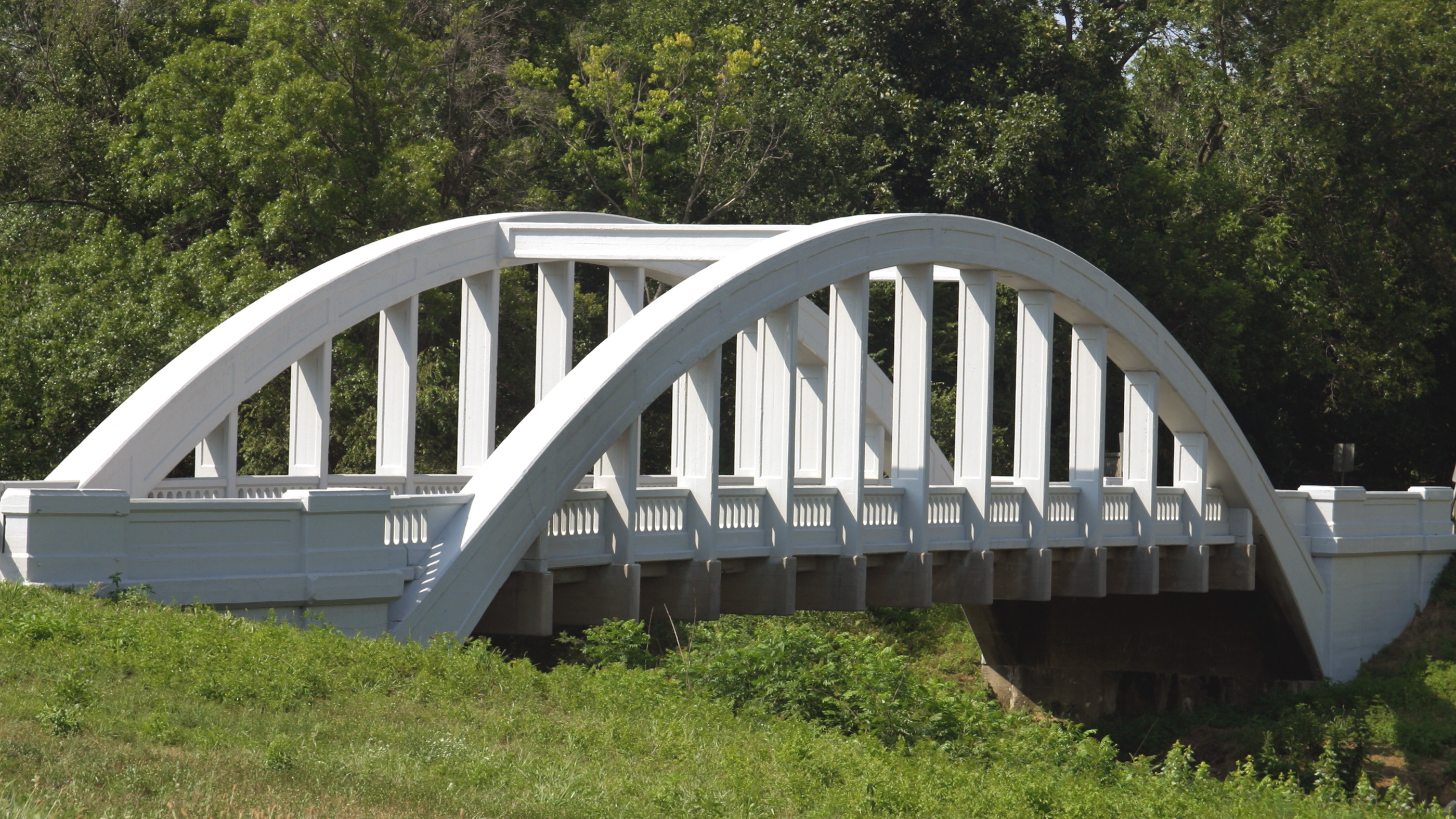
Brush Creek rainbow bridge

A restored Kan-O-Tex Service Station on Main Street in Galena was re-opened in 2007 as a roadside diner and souvenir shop called "Four Women on the Route", later renamed "Cars on the Route" by new owners. It sits in front of the former location of the Banks Hotel which was demolished in 1950s. Sitting to the north of the station is the historic "bordello" which currently is a private residence. Located west across the street from the station is the Smith & Moeller Building (built in 1896) as a lumber and building supply house. In 1932, it became the Front Street Garage selling tires and Phillips 66 gas, later selling White Rose gasoline.

Buildings and structures on the National Register of Historic Places in Kansas include the Baxter Springs Independent Oil and Gas Service Station (now a tourist information site for US 66 in Kansas), the Brush Creek Bridge, and the Williams' Store in Riverton. A 1.2-mile (1.9 km) section of the road between the Missouri state line and Galena is listed on the National Register as the Kansas Route 66 Historic District—East Galena. In addition to the roadway, the district includes seven box culverts, a triple box culvert, and the Galena Viaduct. Although the roadway and all the structures were built during 1922–23, about three years before Route 66 was designated as a federal highway, it was deemed that "as a group these elements, together with their setting, form a cultural landscape that clearly conveys the historic feeling of Route 66."

While buildings and structures on this section of US 66 in its 1950s heyday included five major trucking companies, a series of motels and tourist courts (Sunbeam Tourist Camp, Camp Joy, Baxter Court Cabins, Satterlee's Tourist Cabins, Capistrano Motel) alongside restaurants, roadhouses, filling stations, souvenir stands and commercial stores, by 2002 almost all of the tourist lodging had been demolished. Only a portion of the former Satterlee's remains; it had been converted to storage space. Food service establishments fared somewhat better by relying on a strong local clientele after I-44 bypassed the state in 1961, but ultimately lead and zinc mine closures in the Tri-State district plus the diversion of US 66 traffic by I-44 led to the closure of many local Cherokee County businesses.

U.S. Route 66
Previous state: Oklahoma	Kansas	Next state: Missouri
