= Kan-O-Tex Service Station =

Kan-O-Tex Service Station (Galena)
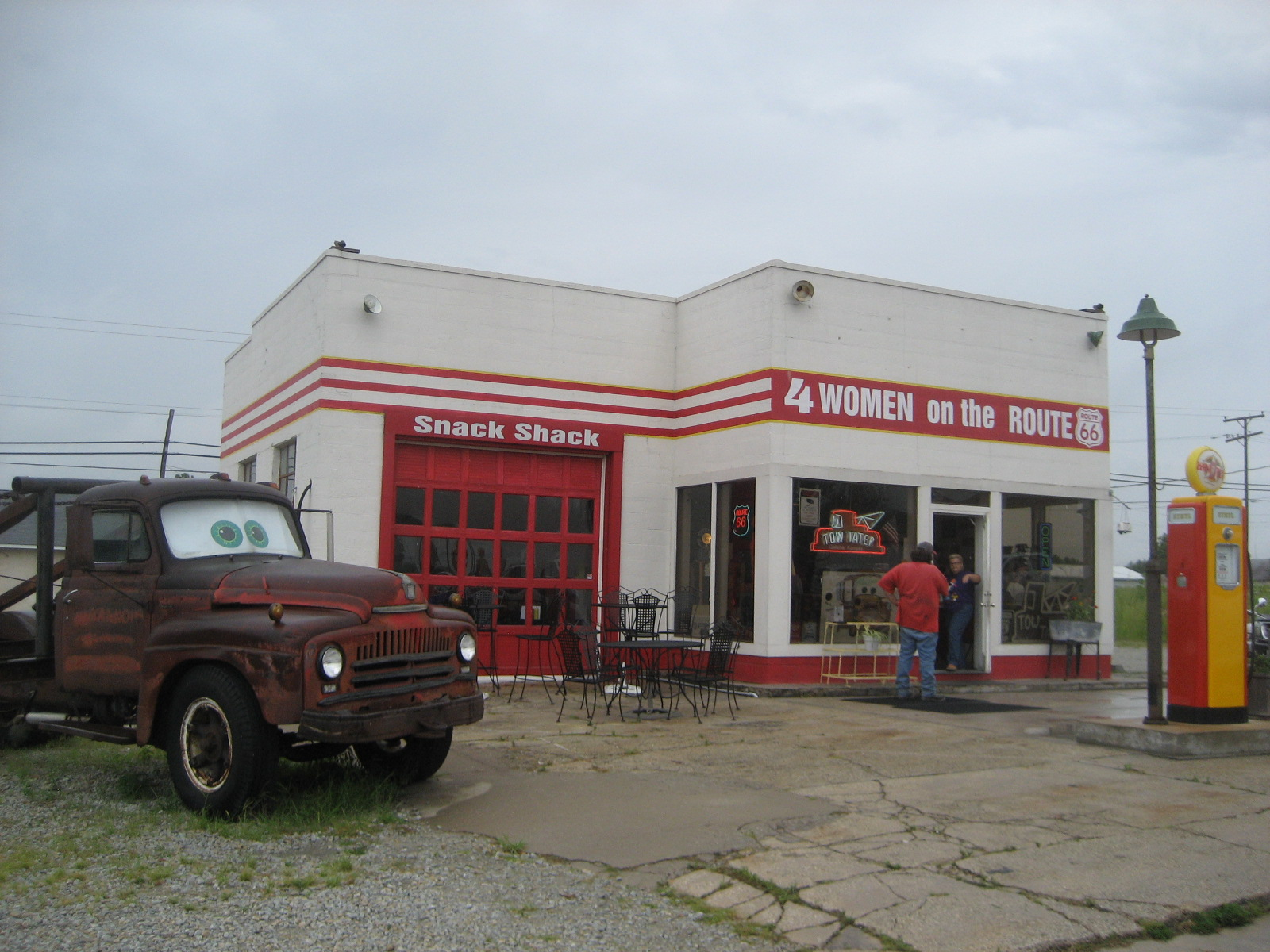
- Interactive map of the Kan-O-Tex Service Station (Galena) area
- Former names: Little's Service Station
- Alternative names: 4 Women on the Route; Cars on the Route

General information
- Type: Historic filling station
- Location: Old US Route 66, 119 North Main Street, Galena, Kansas, United States
- Coordinates: 37°4′49.4″N 94°38′20″W
- Completed: 1934
- Renovated: 2007
- Owner: Melba Rigg, Renée Charles, Judy Courtney, Betty Courtney (d. 2010) (as 4 Women on the Route)

Other information
- Seating type: roadside café
- Seating capacity: 12
- Parking: on-site

The Kan-O-Tex Service Station in Galena, Kansas, United States is a Kan-O-Tex filling station that originally served U.S. Route 66 motorists in 1934. Currently, it is a souvenir shop, snack bar, and heritage-based tourist attraction. It has connections with Pixar movie Cars.

== History ==
US Route 66 was designated in 1926; by 1929 Kansas and Illinois were the first to completely pave their respective segments of this highway.

Little's Service Station installed its fuel pumps on the former site of the Banks Hotel (demolished 1933) at 119 North Main Street in Galena; an automobile repair shop was added later. Before Interstate 44 opened in the area in 1961, bypassing Kansas entirely, US Route 66 in Kansas was a vibrant part of the "Mother Road" which led from Chicago, Illinois to Santa Monica, California.

In 1979, US 66 in Galena was taken off its former Main Street alignment (which came in from Missouri as Front Street, turned south on Main Street, then followed the current K-66 route to Riverton) and routed directly onto 7th Street, bypassing the station. US 66 would become Kansas State Route 66 in 1985, but the station sat vacant, closed and largely abandoned until its 2007 restoration.

=== Restoration ===
The Kan-O-Tex Service Station bears the branding of the former Kanotex Refining Company (1909–1953), a now-defunct regional fuel brand named for Kansas, Oklahoma and Texas. The Kan-O-Tex logo was a Kansas sunflower behind a five-point star.

The station is home to a 1951 International boom truck on which Pixar's animated character Tow Mater was based; Joe Ranft, a Pixar animator, discovered it during a research trip for the movie Cars. In April 2011, a Disney/Pixar crew returned to interview the station's owners for a DVD release of Cars 2. As the "Mater" name is a Disney trademark, the original truck has been named "Tater."

The station was restored in 2007 and renamed 4 Women on the Route. Following an ownership change and the death of one of the founders of 4 Women on the Route, it was renamed again, becoming Cars on the Route, to emphasize its connection with Cars. Located seven blocks north of the current (7th Street) Kansas Route 66, the station retains the original aesthetic design of the fuel pumps and exterior façade but places a diner-style lunch counter in what once would have been the service bay of the station's repair garage. It operates seasonally, closing for the winter and reopening in the spring.
