= U.S. Route 69 =

Highway in the United States

U.S. Route 69
- US 69 highlighted in red

Route information
- Length: 1,136 mi (1,828 km)
- Existed: 1926–present

Major junctions
- South end: US 96 / US 287 / SH 87 at Port Arthur, TX
- I-10 at Beaumont, TX; I-20 at Lindale, TX; I-30 at Greenville, TX; I-40 at Checotah, OK; I-44 at various locations; I-35 at Lenexa, KS; I-70 at Kansas City, KS; I-29 at Gladstone, MO; I-80 at Des Moines, IA
- North end: MN 13 at Albert Lea, MN

Location
- Country: United States
- States: Texas, Oklahoma, Kansas, Missouri, Iowa, Minnesota

Highway system
- United States Numbered Highway System; List; Special; Divided
| ← US 68 | → US 70 |

U.S. Route 69 (US 69) is a major north–south United States highway in the central United States. When it was first created, it was only 150 miles (241 km) long, but it has since been expanded into a Minnesota to Texas cross-country route. The highway's southern terminus (as well as those of US-287 and US-96) is in Port Arthur, Texas at an intersection with State Highway 87. Its northern terminus is in Albert Lea, Minnesota at Minnesota State Highway 13.

== Route description ==
=== Texas ===
US-69 begins at its southern terminus with SH-87 in Port Arthur. This intersection is also the southern terminus for US-96 and US-287, which are concurrent with US-69. US-69, US-96, and US-287 continue in a northwest, then west, route until its intersection with I-10 in southern Beaumont. At this intersection, US-69, US-96, and US-287 merge with I-10. I-10/US-69/US-96/US-287 continue in a northerly direction through Beaumont for several miles. Just after the intersection with US-90, I-10 splits from the multiplex and resumes its easterly course, leaving US-69, US-96, and US-287 heading northwest through Beaumont. US-69 north of I-10 is also known officially known as Eastex Freeway, and is an official evacuation route, just as I-69/US-59 heading north from Houston is known as Eastex Freeway as well.

In Lumberton, US-96 splits from US-69 and US-287 and heads northeast towards Jasper, while US-69 and US-287 continue on a northwest path towards Woodville.

In Woodville, US-69 splits from US-287 a few blocks north of US-190. US-287 continues northwest towards Corrigan while US-69 proceed north towards Lufkin. In this area, between US-190 in Woodville and FM-256 in Colmesneil, US-69 is a part of the Texas Forest Trail. Before reaching Lufkin, US-69 forms another segment of the Texas Forest Trail between SH-63 in Zavalla and FM-1818 northwest of Zavalla.

In Lufkin, US-69 is concurrent with US-59 and State Loop 287 while the route through the city is named Business US-69. US-69, State Loop 287, and US-59 continue around the east side of Lufkin until US-59 separates at the intersection with US-59 Business northeast of Lufkin. US-69 and State Loop 287 continue until the intersection of SH-103 and Business US-69 on the northwest section of Lufkin. At that point, US-69 is concurrent for a short distance with SH-103 and State Loop 287. At the intersection of US-69, State Loop 287 and SH-103, US-69 departs Lufkin and heads northwest while SH-103 and State Loop 287 head south.

US-69 continues on a north to northwest path through the towns of Alto, Rusk, Jacksonville and Bullard. Just south of Bullard, US-69 has a short concurrency with FM-2493. US-69 continues northward into Tyler.

In Tyler, US-69 continues northward through the city and makes up most of "S. Broadway Avenue" from the intersection with Toll 49 until the intersection of SH-110 and SH-155, where US-69 heads west and merges with SH-110 and SH-155 through Tyler. Around seven blocks from the intersection of US-69, SH-110, and SH-155, SH-155 separates from the concurrency and travels in a southwesterly direction, leaving US-69 and SH-110 traveling in a northwesterly direction. This continues until SH-110 separates from US-69 on the northwest side of Tyler. At this intersection, SH-110 heads west while US-69 continues north. Shortly after that, US-69 crosses Loop 323. From here to Mineola, it is signed as "Mineola Highway" except when it is signed as "Main Street" in Lindale.

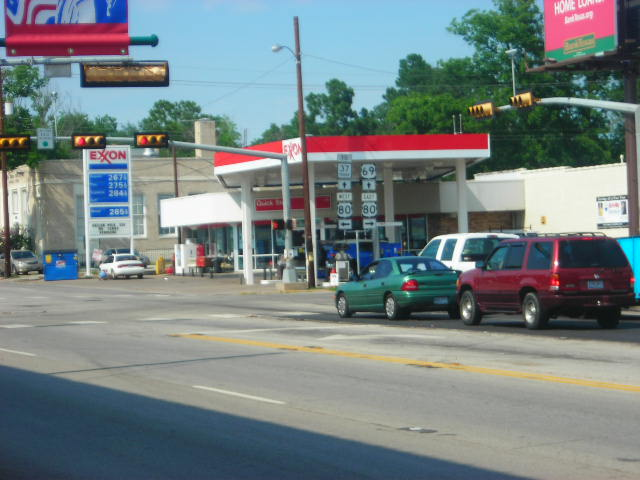
The junction of US-Highways 69 and 80 in Mineola, Texas

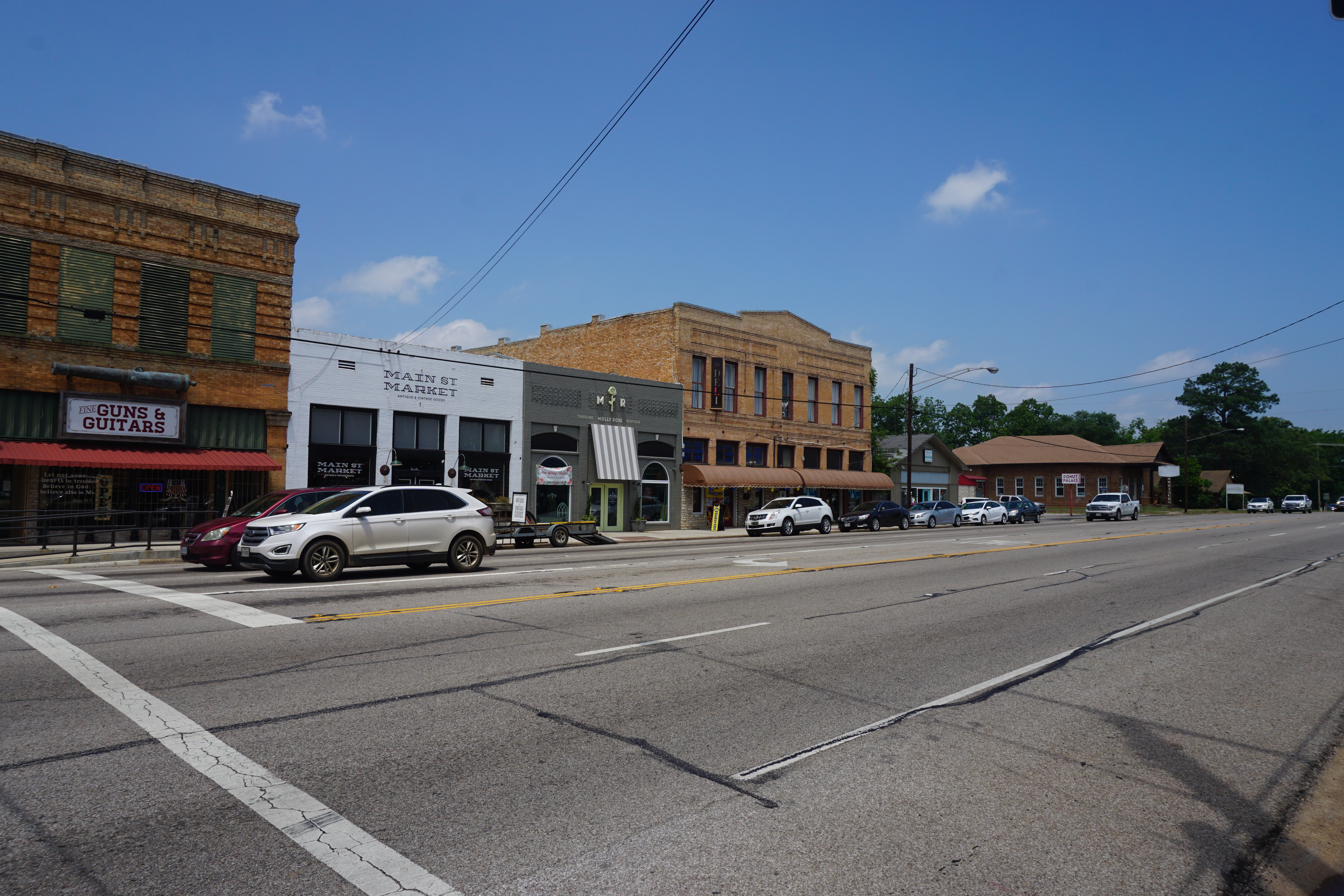
US-69 as Main Street in Lindale

US-69 crosses I-20 at Lindale where it is signed as "Main Street". At FM-16 in Lindale, US-69 begins its third and last segment as part of the Texas Forest Trail. Just before leaving Lindale, US-69 has a junction with Toll 49 at the terminus of Toll 49. US-69 from there continues north to northwest to Mineola, crossing US-80 there. Before leaving town, at its intersection with SH-37, the Texas Forest Trail turns off of US-69 to share a segment with SH-37. US-69 takes a more northwest turn on its way through several small towns, including Emory, on its way to Greenville. There, as it begins to enter the city, a Business route of US-69 turns off to the right to serve the downtown Greenville area, and then on to a junction with I-30. At the intersection with I-30, US-69 becomes concurrent with US-380 at its terminus. The concurrency continues around the southern and western sides of Greenville until an intersection with Spur 302. At that intersection, US-380 heads west while US-69 continues north, until it reaches the northern end of its Business route, which has passed through the downtown Greenville area, then US-69 turns northwest, from Greenville to Leonard, where it encounters a brief concurrency with SH-78.

In Whitewright, SH-11 intersects and becomes concurrent with US-69 southeast of town. This continues until the intersection with SH-160, at which time SH-11 continues on a northwestward route and US-69 continues north through Whitewright.

US-69 continues north, then northwest until Denison, where it turns right to go north, at an intersection with Spur 503. US-69 goes north through downtown Denison, then at the north side of town, US-69 intersects and merges with US-75, at which time US-69 becomes concurrent with US-75. Both head northeast across the Oklahoma/Texas state line at the Red River.

=== Oklahoma ===
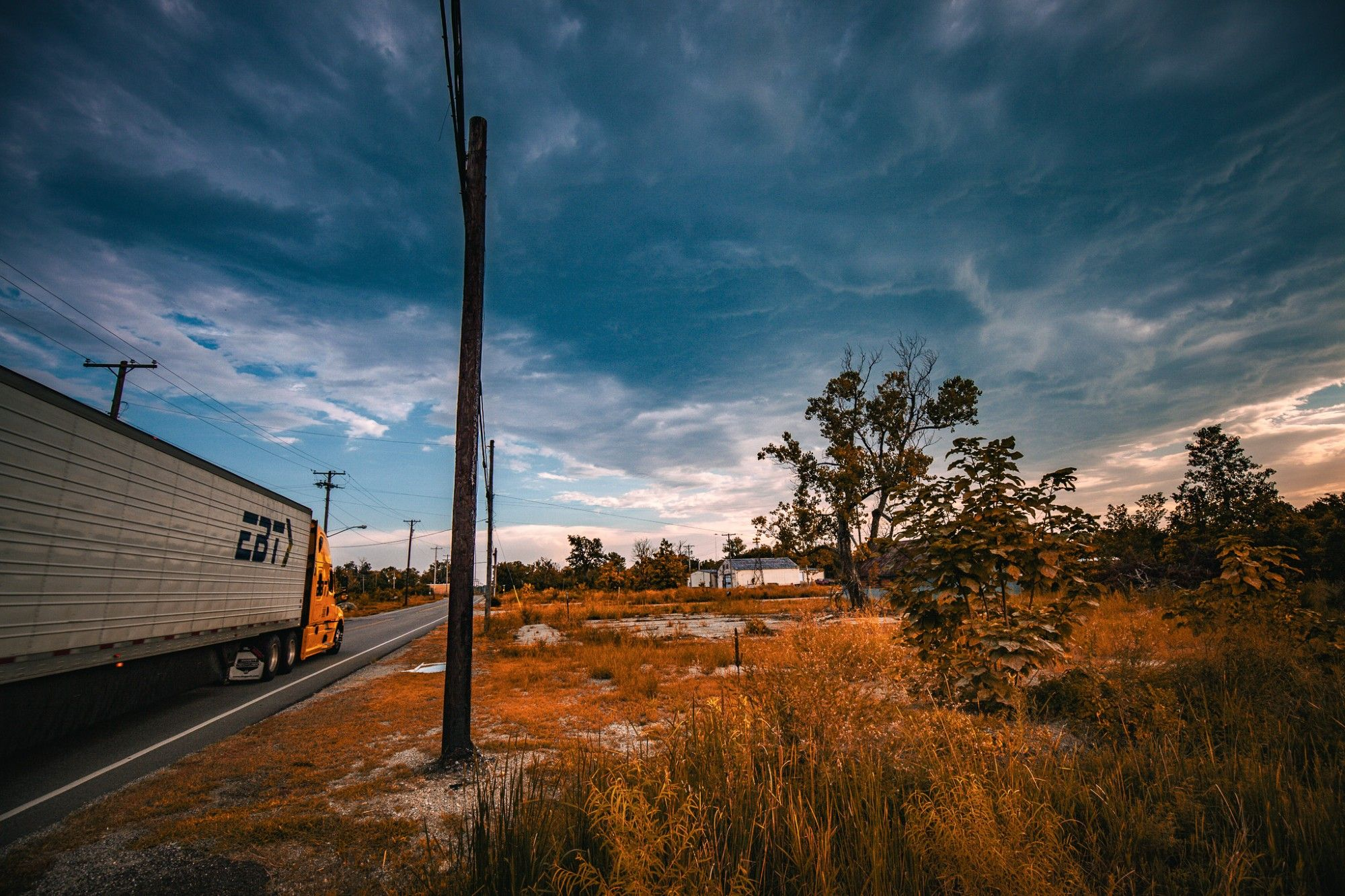
U.S. Rte 69 at East 1st St, Picher, Oklahoma, looking south.

US-69 and US-75 pass the Oklahoma border near the town of Colbert. They remain concurrent all the way to Atoka, where US-69 heads northeast and US-75 heads northwest. US-69 and US-75 briefly merge with SH-3 in Atoka but SH-3 remains concurrent with US-75 instead of US-69 when they split. In Stringtown, US-69 merges with SH-43. SH-43 splits from US-69 near the Atoka Reservoir and crosses it. US-69 passes right by the McAlester Ammunitions Depot. US-69 passes over Eufaula Lake 6 times. Near Muskogee, US-69 merges with US-64 and SH-2. At an intersection with US-62, US-64 heads west concurrent with US-62 while US-69 and SH-2 continue to head north. South of Pryor Creek, US-69 is the westerly boundary of the MidAmerica Industrial Park, one of the largest industrial park in the nation. Near Vinita, US-69 and SH-2 interchange with Historic Route 66 and US-60. The two highways turn east and merge with HR-66 and US-60. In Downtown Vinita, SH-2 heads north while US-69, US-60 and HR-66 head east, passing I-44 a short while later. At SH-85, the three highways make an unexpected northward turn. The three highways merge with US-59 just south of I-44. Still south of I-44, US-60 heads northeast, paralleling I-44, while HR-66, US-69, and US-59 continue heading north, passing I-44. At SH-10, US-59 heads west concurrent with SH-10, while HR-66 and US-69 head north concurrent with SH-10. In Downtown Miami, SH-10 continues heading east, while HR-66 and US-69 turn northward. South of Picher and west of Quapaw, US-69 meets US-69 Alternate. US-69 splits from HR-66 and heads north through the town of Picher.

=== Kansas ===
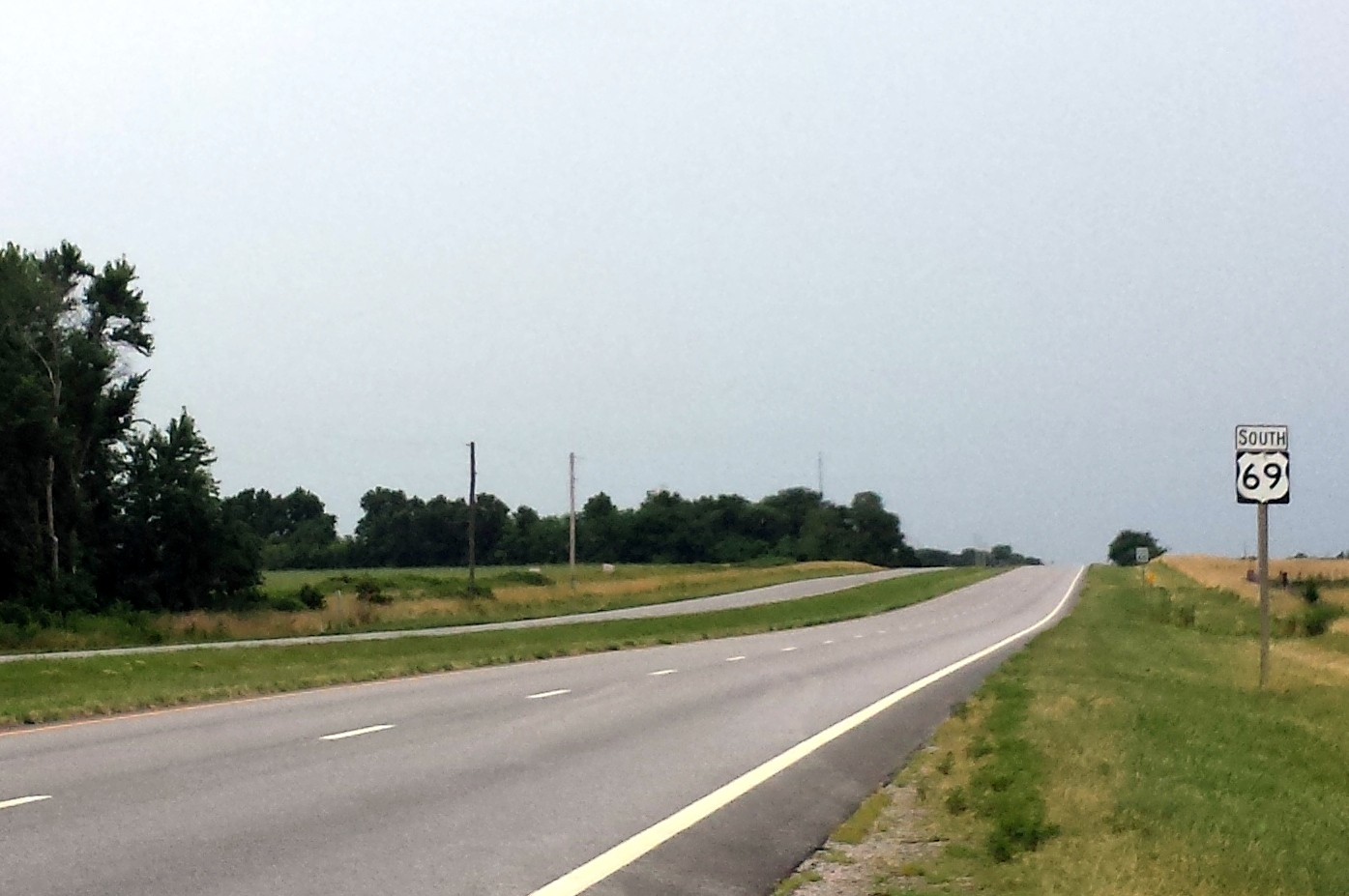
US-69 south of Franklin, KS

At the Oklahoma/Kansas state line, US-69 is joined by K-7. In Columbus, K-7 continues heading north, while US-69 turns east and merges with US-160. US-69 and US-160 meet US-69 Alternate and US-400 near Crestline, and merges with US-400. East of Cherokee, US-400 splits from the concurrency and heads west toward Cherokee. US-69 and US-160 continue heading north. North of Frontenac, US-160 splits from US-69 and heads east towards Lamar and Springfield, Missouri. US-69 continues heading north. South of Fort Scott, US-69 merges with K-7 again. In Fort Scott, US-54 merges with US-69 and K-7. The three highways continue heading north. North of town, US-54 and K-7 split from US-69 and head west; US-69 continues to head north. South of Pleasanton, US-69 merges with K-52. Northeast of Trading Point K-52 splits from US-69 and heads east. In the Kansas City suburbs, US-69 merges with I-35 and US-56/US-169. US-56, US-69, and US-169 split off from I-35 and heads east on Shawnee Mission Parkway. US-69 then heads north on Metcalf Avenue, rejoining I-35 and heading north. A short while later US-69 breaks off from I-35 and heads north on the 18th Street Expressway into Kansas City, Kansas. The highway then splits off and merges with I-70, US-24, and US-40 and heads east. At the intersection with US-169 at the 7th Street Trafficway, US-69 splits off and heads north. Just before reaching I-635, US-69 crosses into Missouri.

=== Missouri ===
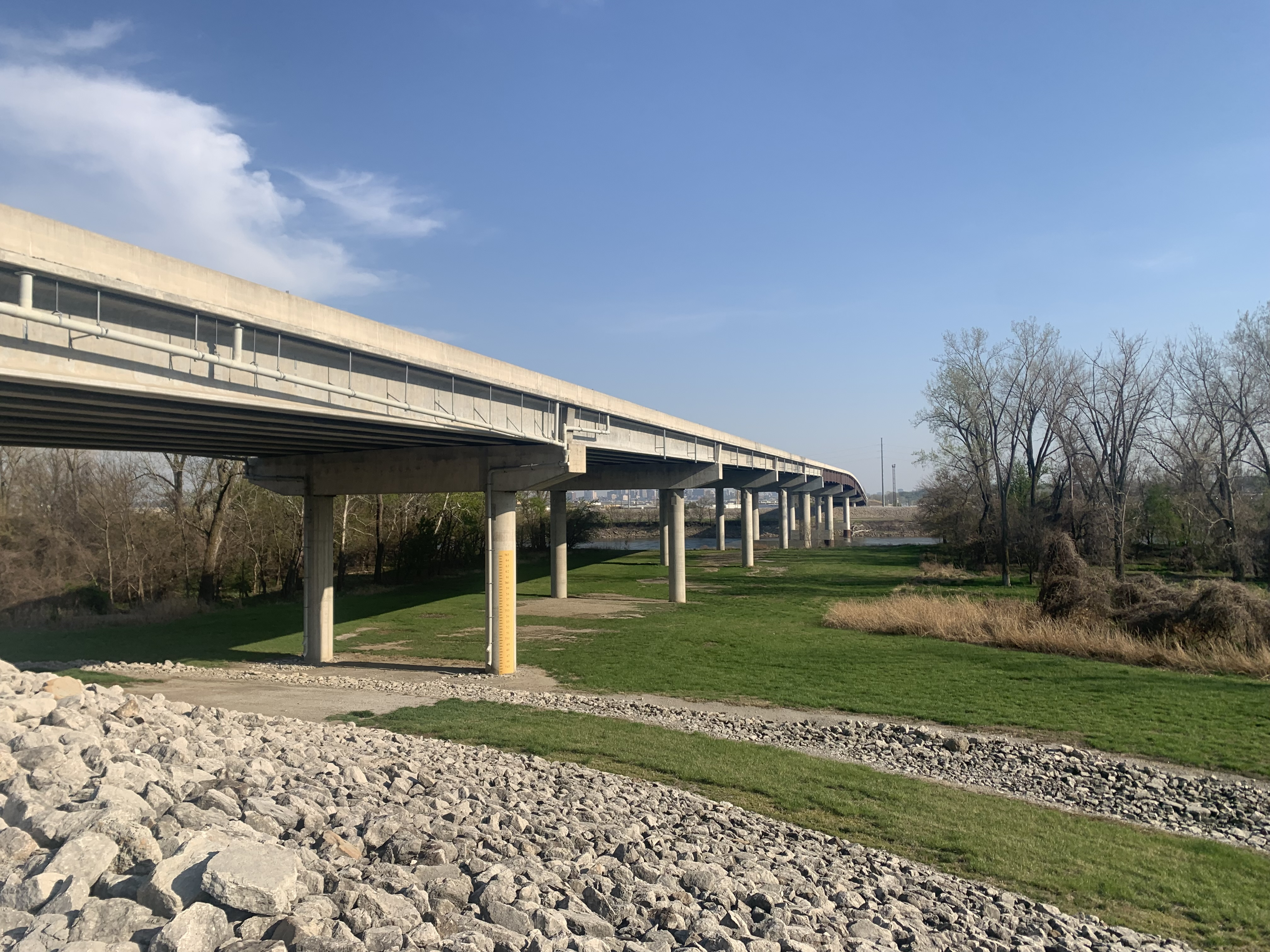
Fairfax Bridge carrying US-69 over Missouri River

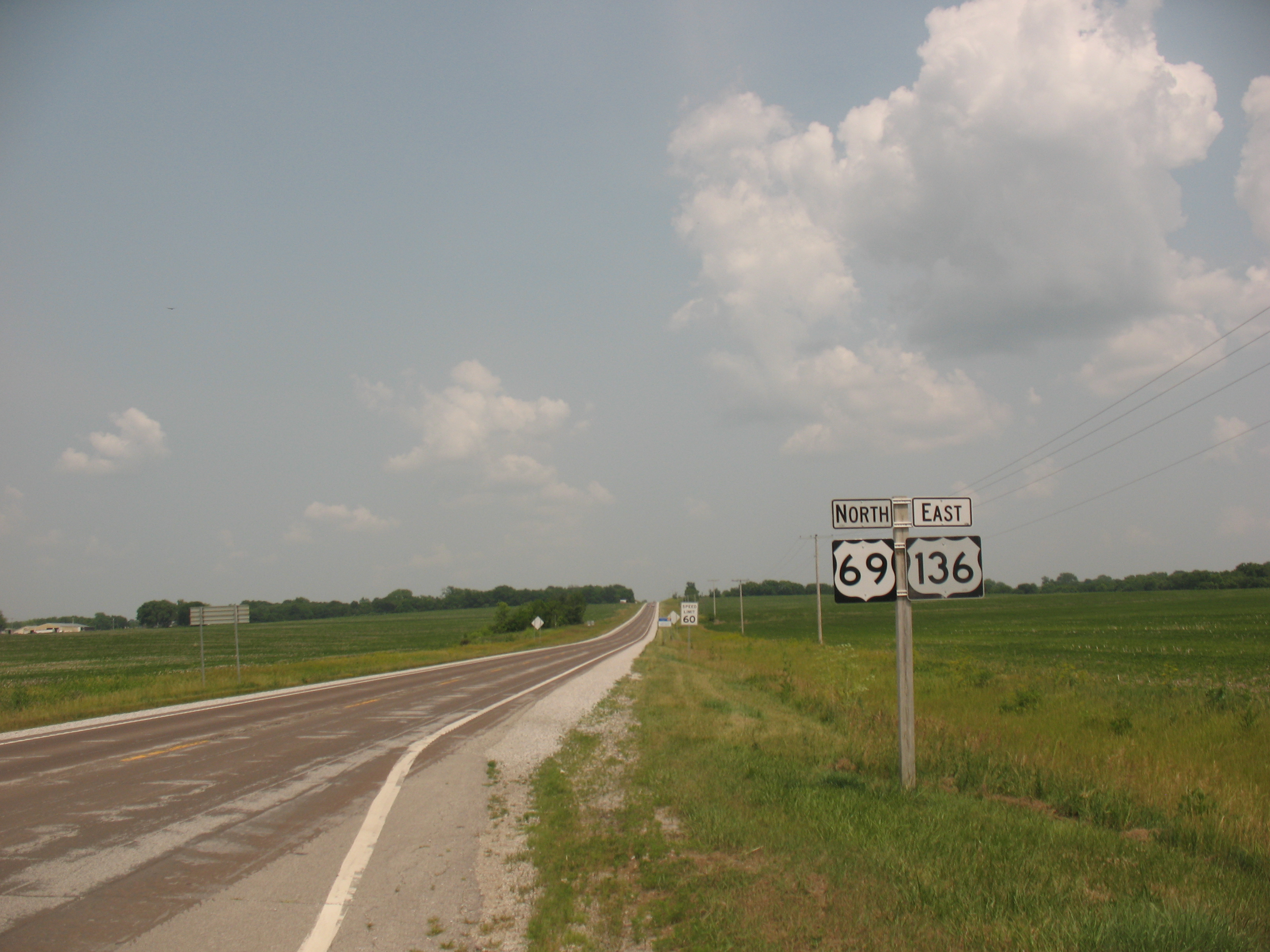
US-69 and US-136 near Bethany, Missouri

US-69 enters Riverside, merges with I-635, then almost immediately exits and merges with MO-9, heading east. A half-mile later, US-69 exits from MO-9 and heads north. US-69 passes through Riverside, Northmoor, Gladstone, Claycomo, Pleasant Valley and parts of Kansas City proper before merging with I-35 for a second time, near Liberty. US-69 stays merged with I-35 for 7 miles (11 km) before it exits. After exiting the highway, US-69 immediately merges with MO-33 and heads northeast. At State Route B, in rural Liberty, MO-33 heads north-northeast and US-69 continues northeast. US-69 stays somewhat parallel to I-35 as it heads through Missouri, sometimes passing under it. West of Altamont, US-69 merges with MO-6. The highways turn north and a short while later MO-6 splits from US-69 and heads west, while US-69 continues heading north. Southwest of Bethany, US-69 merges with US-136 and heads east into Bethany. In downtown Bethany, US-136 heads east, while US-69 heads north. Still paralleling I-35, US-69 passes into Iowa from Missouri 22 miles (35 km) later.

=== Iowa ===
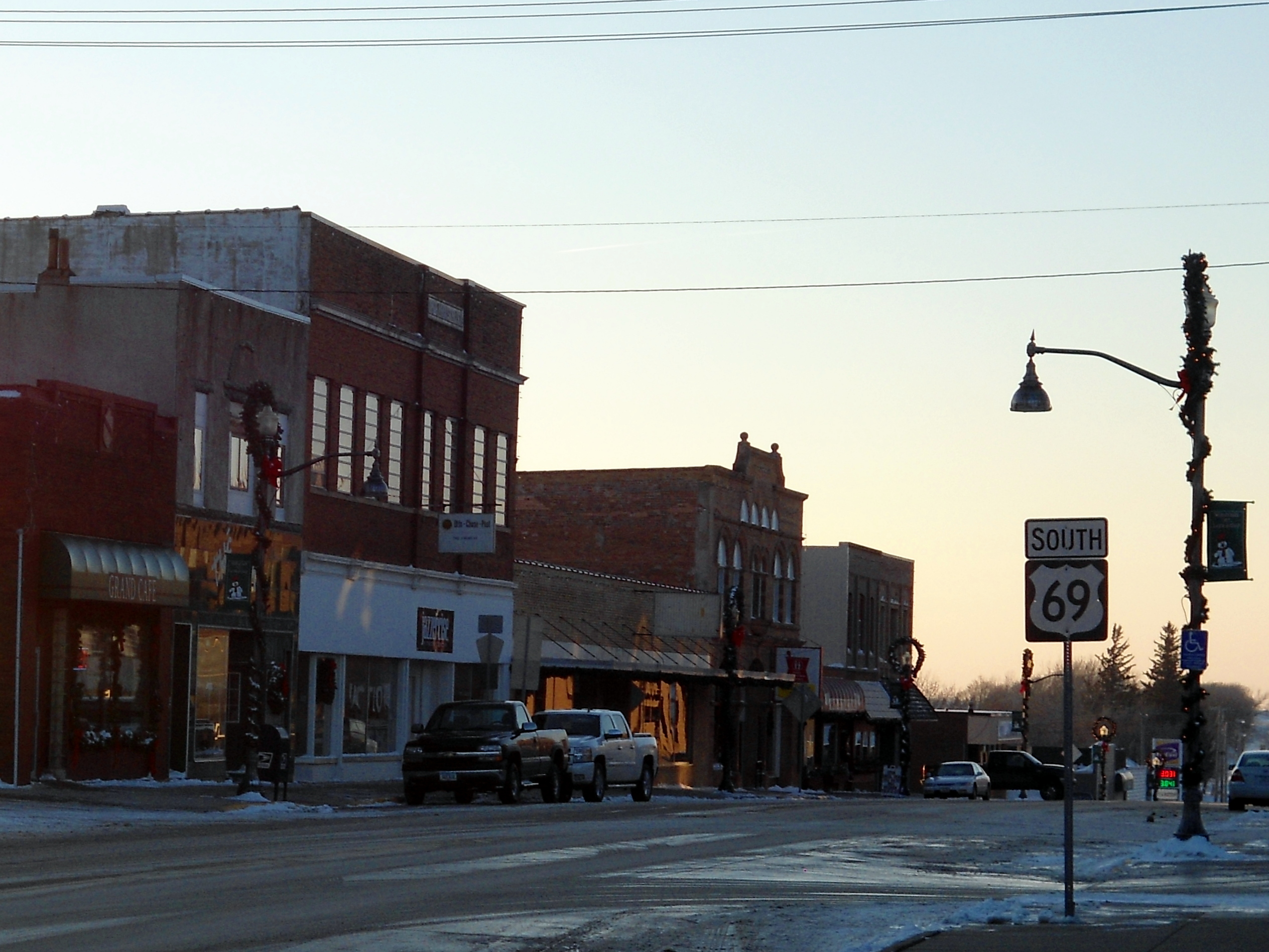
US-69 runs south in Lake Mills, Iowa

In Lamoni, US-69 makes a sharp turn toward the east. West of Leon, US-69 merges with Iowa Highway 2. In downtown Leon, US-69 heads north, while Iowa Highway 2 heads east. East of Lake Ahquabi State Park, US-69 merges with US-65. The two highways continue to head north. At the intersection with Iowa Highway 5, US 65 heads east concurrent Iowa Highway 5 and US 69 continues to head north through Des Moines and Ankeny. In Ames, US 69 makes a left turn, then a right turn, and continues heading north. East of Clarion, US 69 briefly merges with Iowa Highway 3. The two highways soon split with Iowa Highway 3 heading east and US-69 heading north through Belmond, Iowa. Near Garner, US-69 briefly heads west concurrent with US-18, but soon splits off from it and heads north. North of Forest City, US 69 merges with Iowa Highway 9 and continues heading north. Iowa Highway 9 soon branches off to the west. Just south of Emmons, US-69 crosses into Minnesota.

=== Minnesota ===
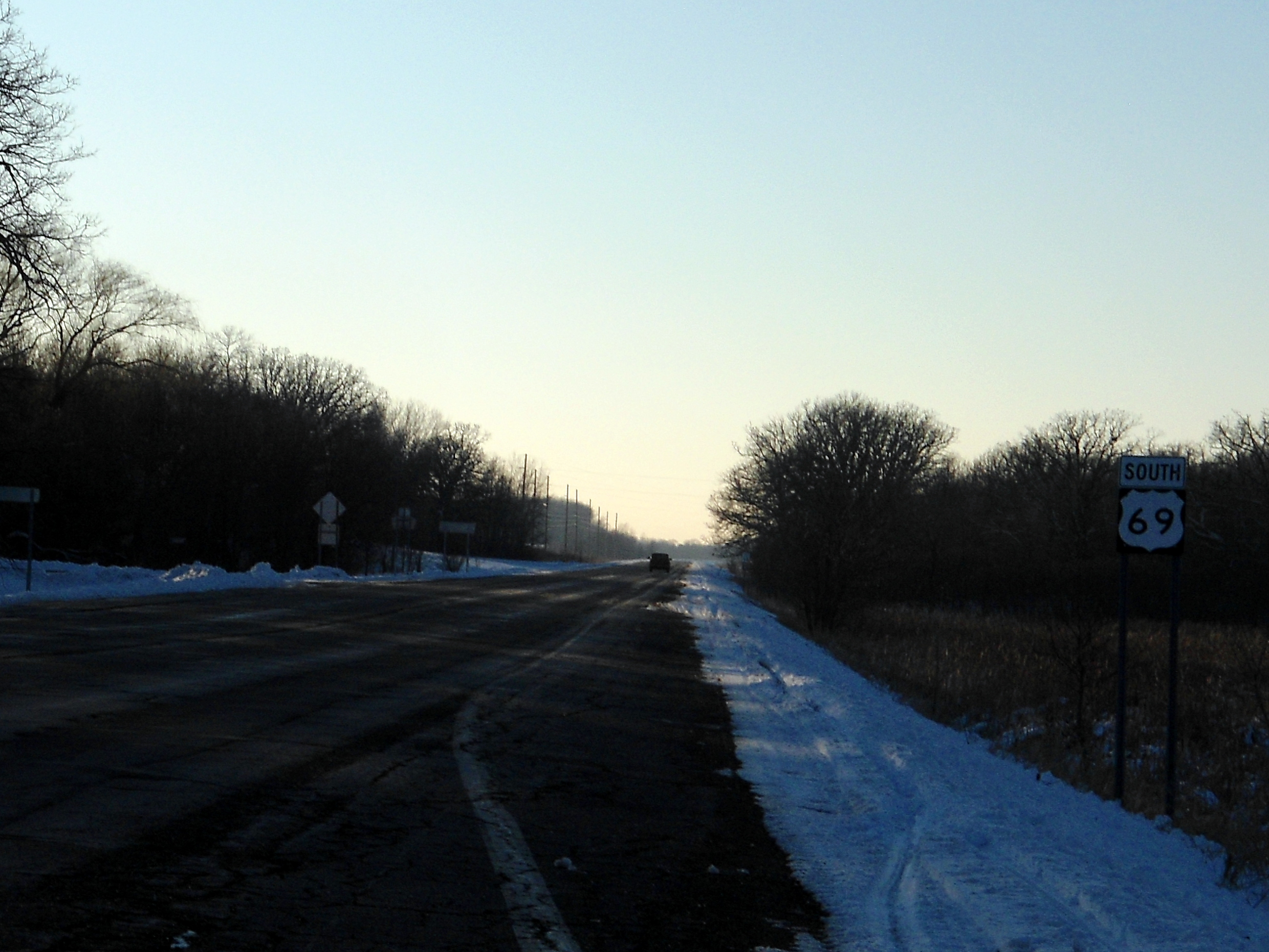
US-69 in Twin Lakes, Minnesota

US-69 enters the state at Emmons and travels north-northeast through southern Minnesota, passing through Twin Lakes. The roadway runs along the eastern shore of Pickerel Lake before entering Albert Lea, where the highway terminates at State Highway 13, formerly US-16.

The Minnesota portion of the highway is 12.5 miles (20.1 km) in length.

== History ==
When it was first commissioned in 1926, US-69 extended only from Leon, Iowa to Kansas City, Missouri. The part in Missouri had been Route 11 since 1922.

The route was extended north into Minnesota in 1934, mostly along what had previously been marked State Highway 13, ending at U.S. 16 in Albert Lea. At this time, it entered the state at Emmons and turned eastward along Lake Street and State Line Road, briefly re-entering Iowa to curve around the south shore of State Line Lake. In 1940, it was realigned to run north-northeast directly to Twin Lakes. The full extent of the roadway in Minnesota was paved in 1941.

In Overland Park, Kansas, US-69 gained express lanes from 103rd street to 151st street with two entrances and exits along the six mile stretch. This project added one express (toll) lane in each direction without the removal of any existing lanes. The lanes were opened on February 21, 2026.

== Major intersections ==
Texas
US 96 / US 287 / SH 87 in Port Arthur. US 69/US 96 travels concurrently to south of Lumberton. US 69/US 287 travels concurrently to Woodville.
I-10 in Beaumont. The highways travel concurrently through Beaumont.
US 90 in Beaumont
US 190 in Woodville
Future I-69 / US 59 in Lufkin. The highways travel concurrently through Lufkin.
US 84 in Rusk
US 79 in Jacksonville
US 175 in Jacksonville
I-20 in Lindale
US 80 in Mineola
I-30 / US 67 / US 380 in Greenville. US 69/US 380 travels concurrently through Greenville.
US 82 in Bells
US 75 in Denison. The highways travel concurrently to Atoka, Oklahoma.
Oklahoma
US 70 in Durant
US 270 on the McAlester–Krebs city line
I-40 southwest of Checotah
US 266 in Checotah
US 64 in Muskogee. The highways travel concurrently through Muskogee.
US 62 in Muskogee. The highways travel concurrently through Muskogee.
US 412 in Chouteau
I-44 in Big Cabin
US 60 west-southwest of Vinita. The highways travel concurrently to northeast of Afton.
I-44 in Vinita
US 59 northeast of Afton. The highways travel concurrently to north of Dotyville.
I-44 / US 60 northeast of Afton
Kansas
US 166 in Baxter Springs
US 160 northeast of Columbus. The highways travel concurrently to Frontenac.
US 400 north of Crestline. The highways travel concurrently to south of Pittsburg.
US 54 in Fort Scott. The highways travel concurrently to north of Fort Scott.
I-435 / US 50 in Overland Park
I-35 / US 56 / US 169 in Lenexa. I-35/US 69 travels concurrently to Merriam. US 56/US 69/US 169 travels concurrently to the Overland Park–Mission city line.
I-35 / I-635 in Mission. I-35/US 69 travels concurrently to Kansas City.
I-70 / US 24 / US 40 in Kansas City.
I-670 in Kansas City
I-70 / US 24 / US 40 / US 169 in Kansas City
Missouri
I-635 in Riverside. The highways travel concurrently through Riverside.
US 169 southeast of Northmoor
I-29 / US 71 in Gladstone
I-35 in Kansas City
I-435 in Claycomo
I-35 in Pleasant Valley. The highways travel concurrently to Liberty.
I-35 south of Cameron
Future I-72 / US 36 in Cameron
I-35 southwest of Winston
I-35 north-northwest of Altamont
US 136 southwest of Bethany. The highways travel concurrently to Bethany.
Iowa
I-35 on the Iowa state line south of Lamoni
I-35 east of Lamoni
US 34 in Osceola
US 65 south of Indianola. The highways travel concurrently to Des Moines.
I-235 in Des Moines
I-35 / I-80 in Des Moines
US 30 in Ames
US 20 south of Blairsburg
US 18 in Garner. The highways travel concurrently to west-northwest of Garner.
Minnesota
MN 13 / CR 46 in Albert Lea

== Special routes ==
=== Alternate route ===
U.S. Route 69 Alternate
- Location: Ottawa County, OK–Cherokee County, KS
- Length: 20.3 mi (32.7 km)

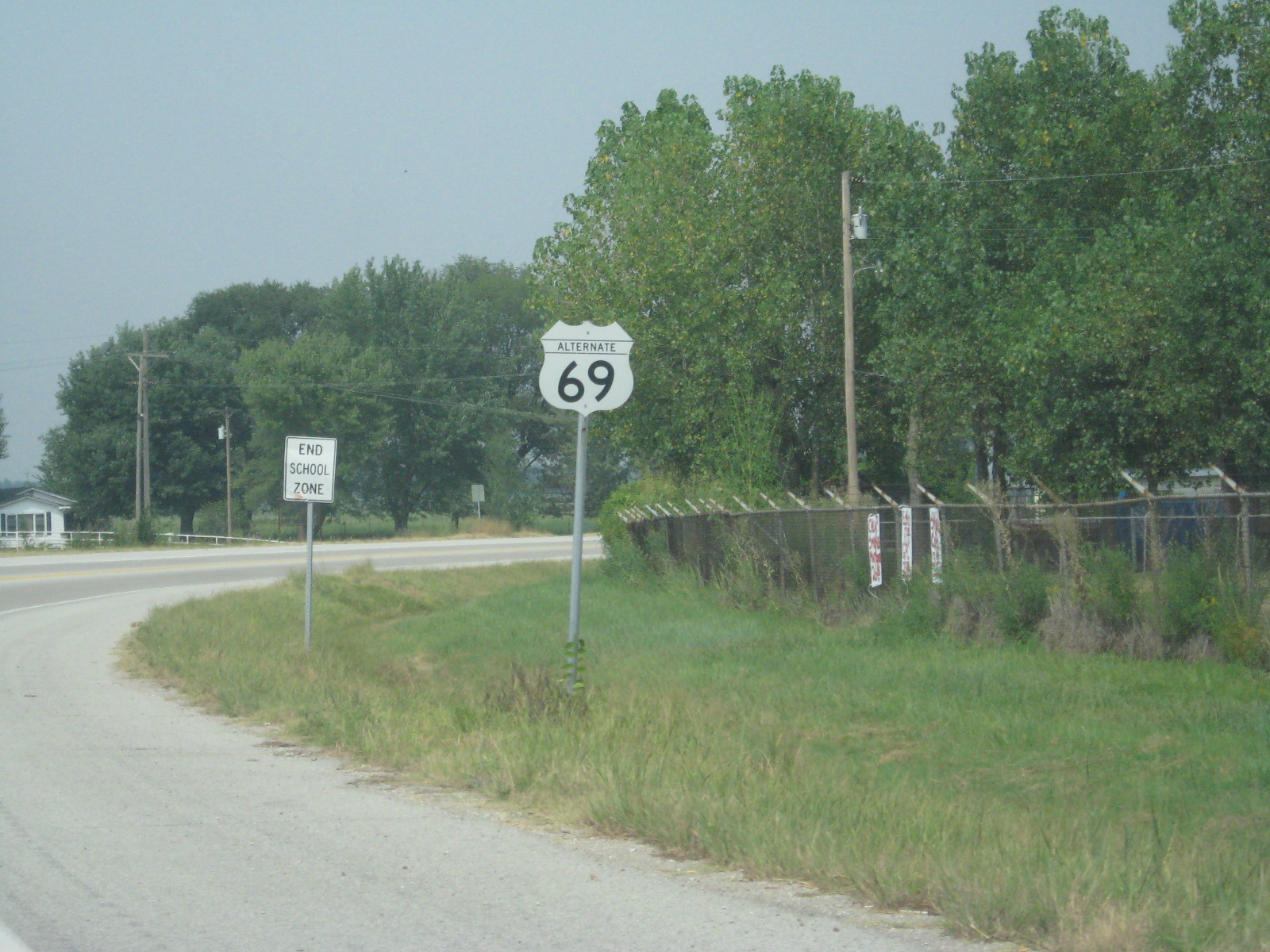

Cutout shield for US-69 Alt. in Oklahoma

U.S. Route 69 Alternate is a special route of U.S. Highway 69, traveling 20.3 miles (32.7 km) between junctions east of Commerce, Oklahoma and north of Crestline, Kansas.

US 69 Alt., cosigned with Historic Route 66, splits from mainline US-69 south of Picher and west of Quapaw. US 69 Alt. and HR-66 head ENE through the towns of Quapaw and Baxter Springs, Kansas. North of Baxter Springs, US-400 joins the concurrency. West of Riverton, Historic US-66 heads east along K-66, while US-69 Alt. and US-400 head north. North of Crestline, US-69 Alt. and US-400 meet US-69 and US-160 from the west. US-69 Alt. terminates as US-69 and US-160 merge with US-400. The concurrency of US-69, US-400, and US-160 continues north.

Major intersections

| State | County | Location | mi | km | Destinations | Notes |
|---|---|---|---|---|---|---|
| Oklahoma | Ottawa | | 0.0 | 0.0 | US 69 south – Commerce, Picher | Southern terminus; highway continues as US 69 south/Historic US 66 west |
| Kansas | Cherokee | Baxter Springs | 9.0 | 14.5 | US-166 (12th Street) – Chetopa | |
| Kansas | Cherokee | Baxter Springs | 9.7 | 15.6 | Historic US 66 east (3rd Street) | North end of Historic US-66 overlap |
| Kansas | Cherokee | | 11.2 | 18.0 | US-400 east | South end of US-400 overlap |
| Kansas | Cherokee | Riverton | 13.0 | 20.9 | K-66 east / Beasley Road | Roundabout |
| Kansas | Cherokee | | 20.3 | 32.7 | US-69 / US-160 / US-400 west – Pittsburg, Columbus | Northern terminus; north end of US-400 overlap; highway continues north as US-69/US-160/US-400 |
1.000 mi = 1.609 km; 1.000 km = 0.621 mi: Concurrency terminus

=== Business loops and spurs ===
- Bethany, Missouri
- Overland Park, Kansas
- Fort Scott, Kansas
- Arma, Kansas
- Frontenac, Kansas
- Pittsburg, Kansas
- Baxter Springs, Kansas
- Columbus, Kansas
- Miami, Oklahoma
- Durant, Oklahoma
- Vinita, Oklahoma
- Mc Alester, Oklahoma
- Checotah, Oklahoma
- Eufaula, Oklahoma
- Greenville, Texas
- Lufkin, Texas

There was also a Business U.S. 69 in Fort Scott, Kansas (about 25 minutes north of the Frontenac, Kansas area), from about 1965 to 1990. Signs from the former Business Route still exist today; however, it no longer officially exists.

== See also ==
- U.S. Route 169

Browse numbered routes
| ← I-69 | TX | → SH 69 |
| ← SH-67 | OK | → US 70 |
| ← K-68 | KS | → I-70 |
| ← Route 68 | MO | → I-70 |
| ← US 67 | IA | → Iowa 70 |
| ← MN 68 | MN | → MN 70 |
