= K-66 (Kansas highway) =

State highway in Kansas, U.S.

K-66
- K-66 highlighted in red

Route information
- Maintained by KDOT
- Length: 5.527 mi (8.895 km)
- Existed: 1985–present

Major junctions
- West end: US 69 Alt. / US-400 in Riverton
- K-26 in Galena
- East end: Route 66 near Galena

Location
- Country: United States
- State: Kansas
- Counties: Cherokee

Highway system
- Kansas State Highway System; Interstate; US; State; Spurs
← K-65	→ K-67

K-66 is a 5.527-mile-long (8.895 km) east–west state highway in the southeastern corner of the U.S. state of Kansas. Its western terminus is at U.S. Route 69 Alternate (US-69 Alt.) and US-400 in Riverton. Its eastern terminus is at the Missouri state line near Galena (where it continues as Missouri Route 66). This road is noteworthy in the fact that it used to be part of the famed US-66. After 1961, the nearby Interstate 44 (I-44) offered a more direct route between Missouri and Oklahoma. In 1985, US-66 was decommissioned nationally. Kansas replaced the US-66 designation with K-66 on the portion of historic highway not numbered as US-69 Alt.

== Route description ==
K-66 begins at a roundabout with US-69 Alt. and US-400 in Riverton. From here the highway travels eastward, and after one mile (1.6 km) intersects Southeast 70th Street and Military Street. Shortly past this intersection, K-66 becomes a four-lane divided highway and then crosses the Spring River. It remains a divided highway for roughly 2.5 miles (4.0 km) then converts back to two-lane, and shortly later intersects the northern terminus of K-26 (South Main Street). Past K-26, the highway travels about one mile (1.6 km) then turns to the northeast and becomes a four-lane divided highway once again. It continues northeastward for a short distance before crossing into Missouri and becoming Missouri Route 66 near Galena.

== History ==
The easternmost section of K-66 was not US-66 until 1979. Prior to 1979, US-66 came in from Missouri as Front Street and turned south on Main Street before joining K-66. US-66 then followed K-66 to Riverton, where K-66 ends. Original US-66 through Kansas continues as a county road to the north and west of US-69 Alt. to Baxter Springs, and joins US-69 Alt. to the Oklahoma state line. The 13 miles (21 km) of US-66 in Kansas retain much of the character of the Mother Road.

Thus the final (1985) alignment of US-66 completely matches present US-69 Alt. and K-66. US-69 Alt. was formed in 1985 when US-66 was decommissioned.

== Major intersections ==
The entire route is in Cherokee County.

Location	mi	km	Destinations	Notes
Riverton	0.000	0.000	US 69 Alt. / US-400 / Beasley Road – Baxter Springs, Pittsburg	Roundabout; western terminus; Beasley Road continues west and is former US-66 west
Galena	4.266	6.865	K-26 south (Main Street south) / Historic US 66 east (Main Street north)	Northern terminus of K-26
Galena	5.527	8.895	Route 66 east (7th Street)	Kansas–Missouri line; continuation beyond eastern terminus
1.000 mi = 1.609 km; 1.000 km = 0.621 mi

U.S. Route 66
Previous state: Oklahoma	Kansas	Next state: Missouri
