= Emmons, Minnesota =

City in Minnesota, United States

Emmons
- City
- Location of Emmons, Minnesota
- Coordinates: 43°30′20″N 93°29′12″W
- Country: United States
- State: Minnesota
- County: Freeborn

Area
  - Total: 0.85 sq mi (2.20 km^{2})
  - Land: 0.85 sq mi (2.19 km^{2})
  - Water: 0.0039 sq mi (0.01 km^{2})
- Elevation: 1,289 ft (393 m)

Population (2020)
  - Total: 367
  - Density: 434/sq mi (167.4/km^{2})
- Time zone: UTC-6 (Central (CST))
  - Summer (DST): UTC-5 (CDT)
- ZIP code: 56029
- Area code: 507
- FIPS code: 27-19340
- GNIS feature ID: 2394691
- Website: https://emmons.municipalimpact.com/

Emmons (/ˈɛmənz/ EM-ənz) is a city in Freeborn County, Minnesota, United States. As of the 2020 census, Emmons had a population of 367.

== History ==
Emmons was incorporated in 1899, and named for Henry G. Emmons, an early settler. A post office has been in operation at Emmons since 1899.

== Geography ==
According to the United States Census Bureau, the city has a total area of 0.80 square miles (2.07 km^{2}), of which 0.79 square miles (2.05 km^{2}) is land and 0.01 square miles (0.03 km^{2}) is water.

Emmons is southwest of Albert Lea, along U.S. Highway 69.

== Demographics ==
Historical population
Census	Pop.	Note	%±
1900	179		—
1910	223		24.6%
1920	297		33.2%
1930	292		−1.7%
1940	334		14.4%
1950	356		6.6%
1960	408		14.6%
1970	412		1.0%
1980	465		12.9%
1990	439		−5.6%
2000	432		−1.6%
2010	391		−9.5%
2020	367		−6.1%
U.S. Decennial Census

=== 2010 census ===
As of the census of 2010, there were 391 people, 174 households, and 119 families residing in the city. The population density was 494.9 inhabitants per square mile (191.1/km^{2}). There were 190 housing units at an average density of 240.5 per square mile (92.9/km^{2}). The racial makeup of the city was 96.4% White, 0.3% Native American, 0.8% from other races, and 2.6% from two or more races. Hispanic or Latino of any race were 4.6% of the population.

There were 174 households, of which 29.9% had children under the age of 18 living with them, 52.3% were married couples living together, 12.1% had a female householder with no husband present, 4.0% had a male householder with no wife present, and 31.6% were non-families. 28.7% of all households were made up of individuals, and 10.9% had someone living alone who was 65 years of age or older. The average household size was 2.25 and the average family size was 2.67.

The median age in the city was 43.4 years. 23.5% of residents were under the age of 18; 5.8% were between the ages of 18 and 24; 22.3% were from 25 to 44; 28.8% were from 45 to 64; and 19.4% were 65 years of age or older. The gender makeup of the city was 46.3% male and 53.7% female.

=== 2000 census ===
As of the census of 2000, there were 432 people, 178 households, and 134 families residing in the city. The population density was 538.6 inhabitants per square mile (208.0/km^{2}). There were 191 housing units at an average density of 238.1 per square mile (91.9/km^{2}). The racial makeup of the city was 96.30% White, 0.46% African American, 0.23% Native American, 2.31% from other races, and 0.69% from two or more races. Hispanic or Latino of any race were 4.40% of the population.

There were 178 households, out of which 34.3% had children under the age of 18 living with them, 58.4% were married couples living together, 11.2% had a female householder with no husband present, and 24.2% were non-families. 22.5% of all households were made up of individuals, and 16.3% had someone living alone who was 65 years of age or older. The average household size was 2.43 and the average family size was 2.74.

In the city, the population was spread out, with 26.2% under the age of 18, 8.6% from 18 to 24, 25.5% from 25 to 44, 22.7% from 45 to 64, and 17.1% who were 65 years of age or older. The median age was 38 years. For every 100 females, there were 87.8 males. For every 100 females age 18 and over, there were 86.5 males.

The median income for a household in the city was $37,083, and the median income for a family was $47,813. Males had a median income of $34,583 versus $21,750 for females. The per capita income for the city was $16,825. About 5.9% of families and 8.0% of the population were below the poverty line, including 5.8% of those under age 18 and 23.2% of those age 65 or over.
