= Twin Lakes, Freeborn County, Minnesota =

City in Minnesota, United States

Twin Lakes, Minnesota
- City
- Location of Twin Lakes, Minnesota
- Coordinates: 43°33′39″N 93°25′25″W
- Country: United States
- State: Minnesota
- County: Freeborn
- Platted: 1858
- Incorporated: April 8, 1957

Government
  - Mayor: David Prestholt

Area
  - Total: 0.552 sq mi (1.430 km^{2})
  - Land: 0.487 sq mi (1.262 km^{2})
  - Water: 0.024 sq mi (0.061 km^{2})
- Elevation: 1,283 ft (391 m)

Population (2020)
  - Total: 134
  - Estimate (2022): 133
  - Density: 275.1/sq mi (106.21/km^{2})
- Time zone: UTC−6 (Central (CST))
  - Summer (DST): UTC−5 (CDT)
- ZIP Code: 56089
- Area code: 507
- FIPS code: 27-65920
- GNIS feature ID: 2397072
- Sales tax: 7.375%

Twin Lakes is a city in Freeborn County, Minnesota, United States, near Albert Lea. The population was 134 at the 2020 census.

== History ==
Twin Lakes was platted in 1858, and named for a pair of lakes near the town site. The railroad was extended to town in 1878. A post office was established at Twin Lakes in 1881.

== Geography ==
According to the United States Census Bureau, the city has a total area of 0.551 square miles (1.43 km^{2}), of which 0.487 square miles (1.26 km^{2}) is land and 0.021 square miles (0.05 km^{2}) is water.

Twin Lakes is along U.S. Highway 69. I-35 is nearby.

== Demographics ==
Historical population
Census	Pop.	Note	%±
1880	77		—
1960	153		—
1970	230		50.3%
1980	210		−8.7%
1990	154		−26.7%
2000	168		9.1%
2010	151		−10.1%
2020	134		−11.3%
2022 (est.)	133	▼	−0.7%
U.S. Decennial Census; 2020 Census

=== 2010 census ===
As of the 2010 census, there were 151 people, 76 households, and 38 families living in the city. The population density was 308.2 inhabitants per square mile (119.0/km^{2}). There were 85 housing units at an average density of 173.5 per square mile (67.0/km^{2}). The racial makeup of the city was 97.4% White, 2.0% from other races, and 0.7% from two or more races. Hispanic or Latino of any race were 2.0% of the population.

There were 76 households, of which 18.4% had children under the age of 18 living with them, 36.8% were married couples living together, 7.9% had a female householder with no husband present, 5.3% had a male householder with no wife present, and 50.0% were non-families. 42.1% of all households were made up of individuals, and 2.6% had someone living alone who was 65 years of age or older. The average household size was 1.99 and the average family size was 2.63.

The median age in the city was 49.5 years. 17.9% of residents were under the age of 18; 3.9% were between the ages of 18 and 24; 22.5% were from 25 to 44; 44.3% were from 45 to 64; and 11.3% were 65 years of age or older. The gender makeup of the city was 55.0% male and 45.0% female.

=== 2000 census ===
As of the 2000 census, there were 168 people, 80 households, and 44 families living in the city. The population density was 350.4 inhabitants per square mile (135.3/km^{2}). There were 83 housing units at an average density of 173.1 per square mile (66.8/km^{2}). The racial makeup of the city was 99.40% White and 0.60% Native American. Hispanic or Latino of any race were 1.79% of the population.

There were 80 households, out of which 22.5% had children under the age of 18 living with them, 46.3% were married couples living together, 7.5% had a female householder with no husband present, and 45.0% were non-families. 38.8% of all households were made up of individuals, and 16.3% had someone living alone who was 65 years of age or older. The average household size was 2.10 and the average family size was 2.77.

In the city, the population was spread out, with 19.0% under the age of 18, 11.3% from 18 to 24, 24.4% from 25 to 44, 29.2% from 45 to 64, and 16.1% who were 65 years of age or older. The median age was 41 years. For every 100 females, there were 97.6 males. For every 100 females age 18 and over, there were 109.2 males.

The median income for a household in the city was $31,250, and the median income for a family was $34,688. Males had a median income of $30,625 versus $22,321 for females. The per capita income for the city was $16,258. About 8.1% of families and 15.2% of the population were below the poverty line, including 25.0% of those under the age of eighteen and 9.5% of those 65 or over.
