= Galena High School (Kansas) =

Location
- 702 E. 7th Street; Galena, Kansas 66739; United States; 37.0738°N 94.6337°W

Information
- School type: Public, High School
- Established: 1904
- School district: Galena USD 499
- Principal: Beau Sarwinski
- Grades: 9 to 12
- Enrollment: 236 (2023-2024)
- Student to teacher ratio: 14.98
- Colors: Blue; White
- Mascot: Bulldogs
- Website: School website

Galena High School is a public secondary school in Galena, Kansas, United States. It is operated by the Galena USD 499 school district. The school colors are blue and white and the school mascot is a Bulldog.

== Notable people ==
Jake LaTurner (b. 1988), U.S. representative for Kansas's 2nd congressional district.

== See also ==
- List of high schools in Kansas
- List of unified school districts in Kansas
