= Rainbow Bridge (Kansas) =

Bridge in Kansas, U.S.

- Brush Creek Bridge
- U.S. National Register of Historic Places
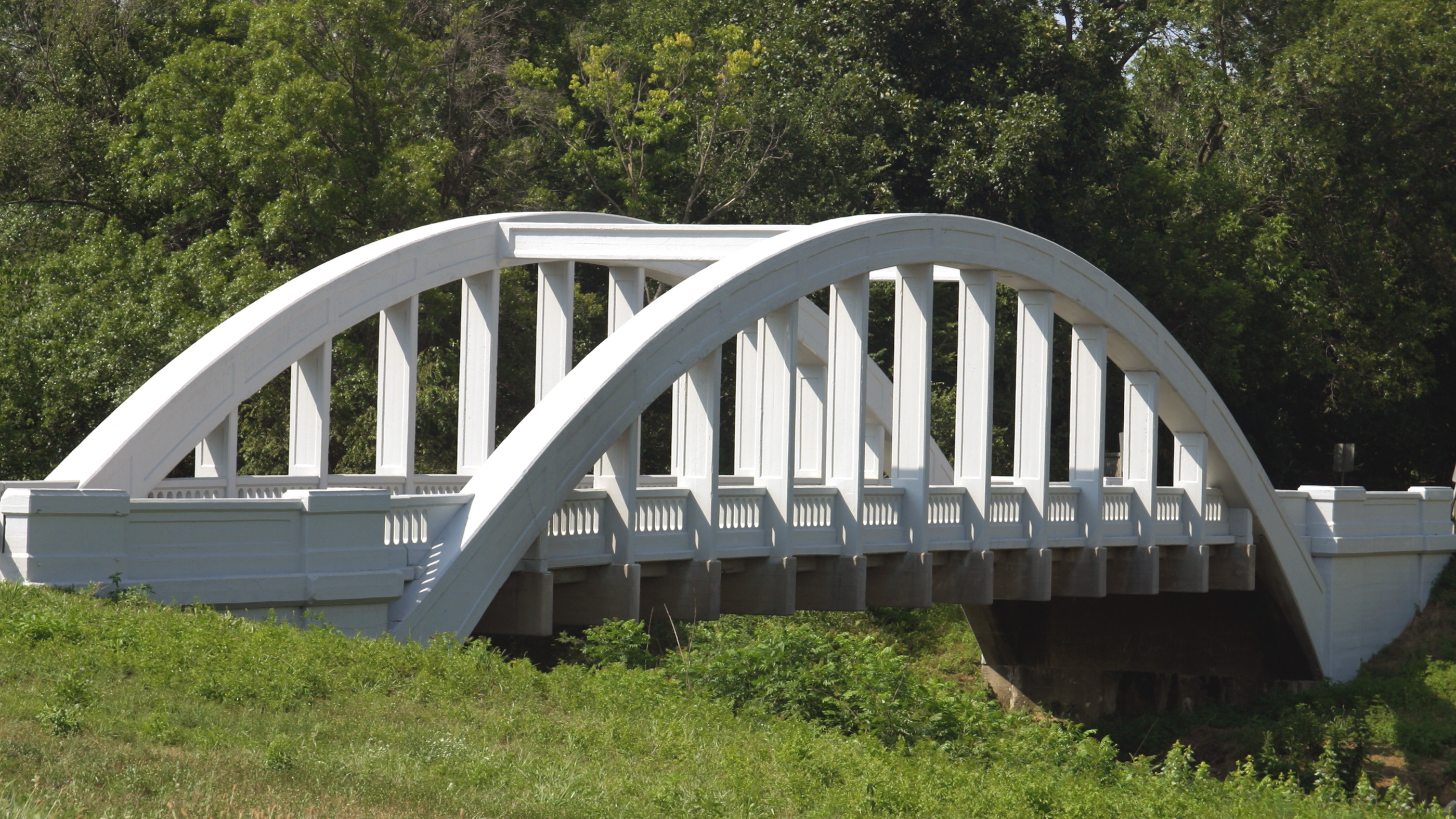
- Rainbow Bridge

- Location within Kansas Location within the United States
- Nearest city: Baxter Springs, Kansas
- Coordinates: 37°4′24.25″N 94°44′26.04″W
- Built: 1923
- Architect: James Barney Marsh
- MPS: Rainbow Arch Marsh Arch Bridges of Kansas TR
- NRHP reference No.: 83000419
- Added to NRHP: March 10, 1983

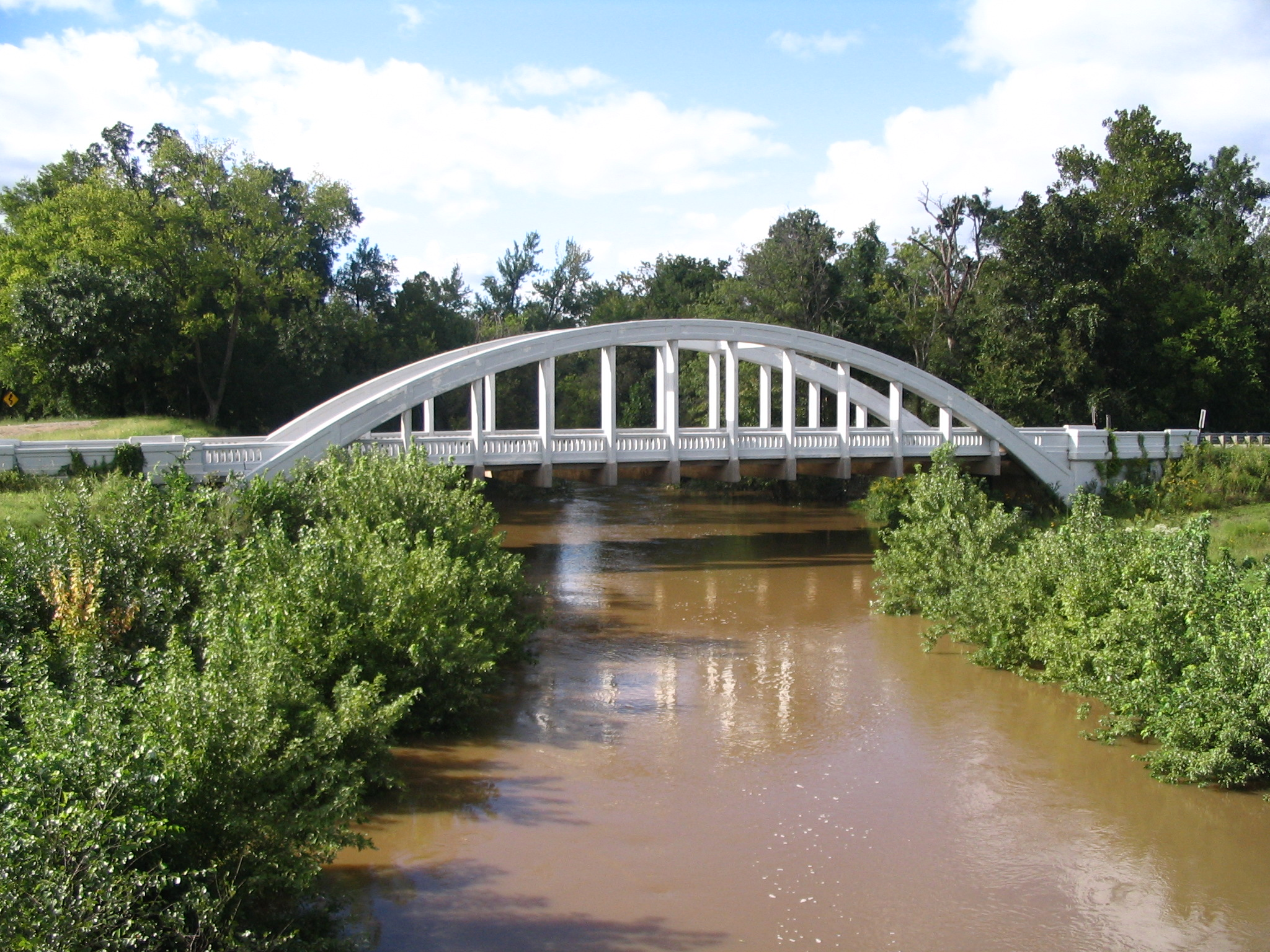
Rainbow Bridge over Brush Creek

The Rainbow Bridge is an old bridge over Brush Creek approximately two miles west of Riverton, Kansas on former U.S. Route 66 (US 66), now a county road. The bridge is a single-span concrete Marsh arch bridge and is the sole surviving bridge of this type on the entire length of the former highway. Two other Marsh arch bridges were also located on US 66 in Kansas, both over the Spring River. It was built in 1923.

The bridge has often been covered with graffiti, but was recently re-painted white. The bridge has been placed on the National Register of Historic Places (as the Brush Creek Bridge) on March 10, 1983, due to its connection with US-66 and is also a Kansas state landmark. In 2014, Kansas Rt. 66 Historic Byway nominated a bypassed 2.1 miles (3.4 km) section of original 1926 highway, which ran south from the Brush Creek to the Willow Creek Bridge near Baxter Springs, for an NRHP listing.

The bridge is fairly narrow, and due to traffic on the road, a replacement bridge has been built. The road curves toward the new bridge toward Baxter Springs, but a short, one-way road carries traffic to the Rainbow Bridge, which may still be crossed. This was part of a compromise after a disagreement between the county and the Kansas Route 66 Association as federal funds used for construction of the new bridge required demolition of the old. The bridge had been listed with the National Register, which prohibited condemnation of the old bridge.

In the year 2000, country singer Brad Paisley performed "Route 66" on the bridge for the TLC special, "Route 66: Main Street America".

== See also ==
- List of bridges on the National Register of Historic Places in Kansas
- National Register of Historic Places listings in Cherokee County, Kansas
