= Williams' Store =

- U.S. National Register of Historic Places
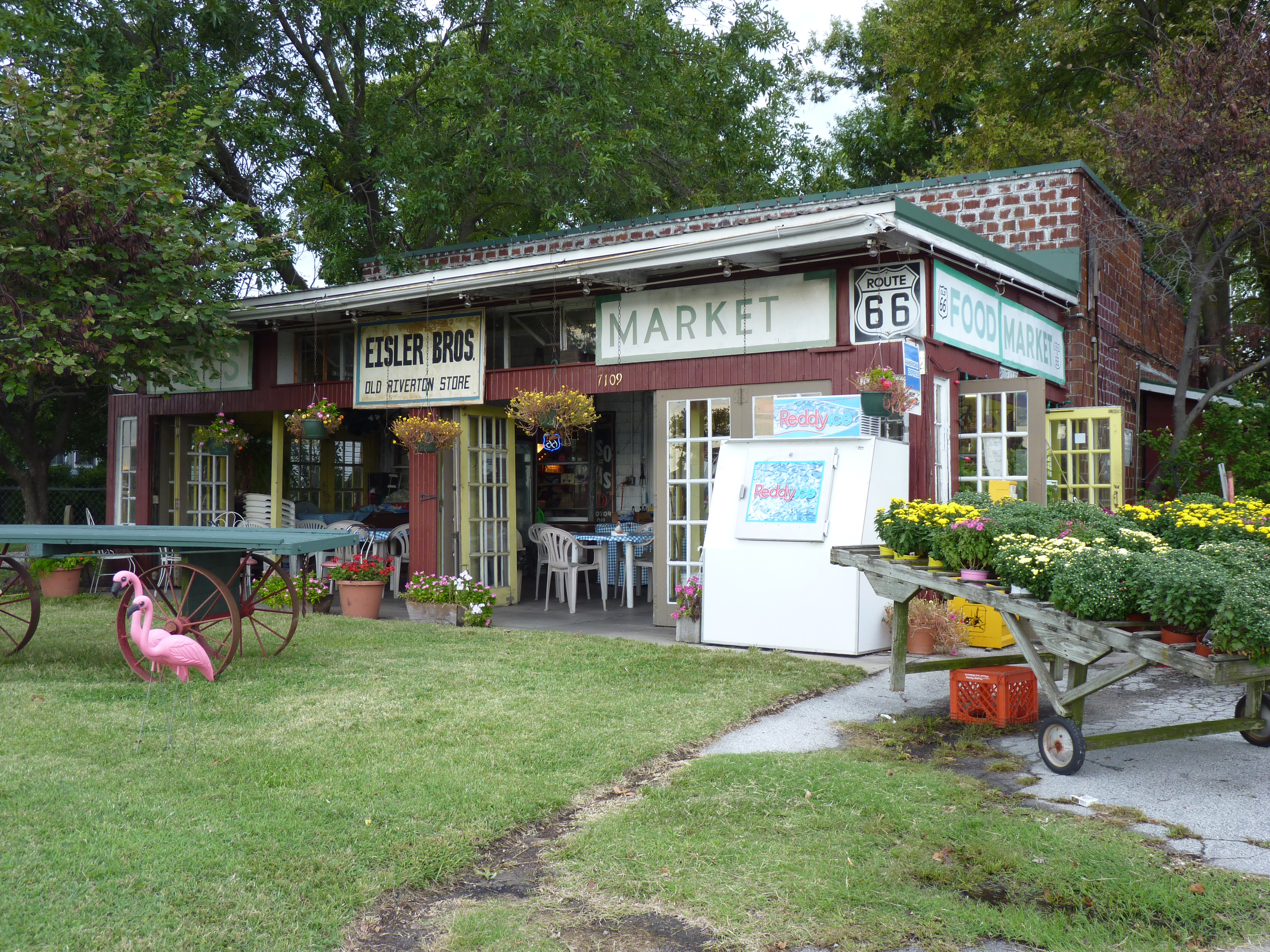

- Location within Kansas Location within the United States
- Location: 7109 SE Highway 66, Riverton, Kansas
- Coordinates: 37°4′30″N 94°42′10″W
- Area: less than one acre
- Built by: Williams, Leo
- MPS: Route 66 in Kansas MPS
- NRHP reference No.: 03000843
- Added to NRHP: August 29, 2003

Williams' Store is a historic store located along Old U.S. Route 66 in Riverton, Kansas. Leo Williams built the store in 1925, the year before Route 66 was designated. The store had a gas station and sold a variety of goods. While it was mainly a grocery and general store, Williams and his wife Lora sold chili and barbecue beef to travelers on Route 66. The store even had a croquet court at one point, which hosted local tournaments. The court was eventually removed to add parking. Leo Williams leased the store to Lloyd Paxon in 1945; Leo died before the lease expired; his wife Lora ran the store until 1970.

The store is now known as the Eisler Brothers Old Riverton Store. It is still in operation and serves as the headquarters of the Route 66 Association of Kansas. This place was the inspiration for the Route 66 songs for the Pixar movie Cars.

The store was added to the National Register of Historic Places on August 29, 2003.
