= Lowell, Kansas =

Unincorporated community in Cherokee County, Kansas

- CDP
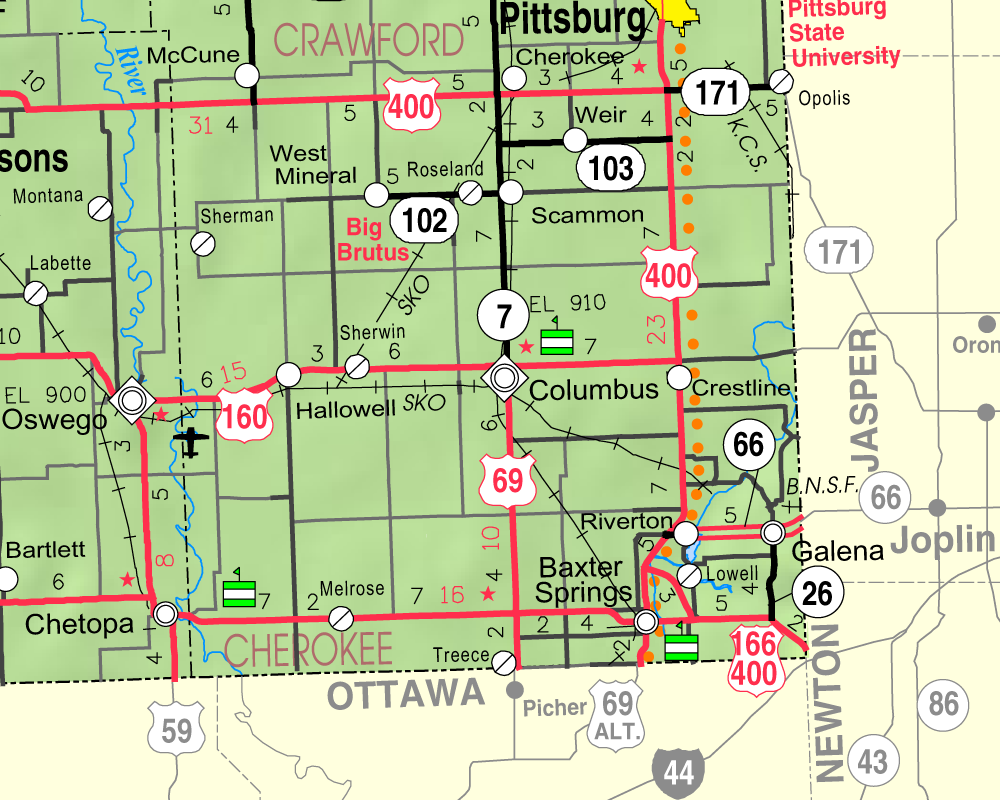
- KDOT map of Cherokee County (legend)

- Location within Kansas Location within the United States
- Coordinates: 37°03′03″N 94°42′11″W
- Country: United States
- State: Kansas
- County: Cherokee
- Elevation: 827 ft (252 m)

Population (2020)
  - Total: 244
- Time zone: UTC-6 (CST)
  - Summer (DST): UTC-5 (CDT)
- ZIP Code: 66713, 66739
- Area code: 620
- FIPS code: 20-43050
- GNIS ID: 2630053

Lowell is a census-designated place (CDP) in Cherokee County, Kansas, United States. As of the 2020 census, the population was 244.

== History ==
A post office was opened in Lowell in 1868, and remained in operation until it was discontinued in 1905.

== Geography ==
Lowell is located in southeastern Cherokee County near the southeastern corner of Kansas. It is bordered to the north by the Spring River, a tributary of the Neosho River. Across the river is the community of Riverton. Baxter Springs is 4 miles (6 km) by road to the southwest.

== Demographics ==
Historical population
Census	Pop.	Note	%±
2010	283		—
2020	244		−13.8%
U.S. Decennial Census

The 2020 United States census counted 244 people, 83 households, and 54 families in Lowell. The population density was 777.1 per square mile (300.0/km^{2}). There were 101 housing units at an average density of 321.7 per square mile (124.2/km^{2}). The racial makeup was 86.48% (211) white or European American (85.66% non-Hispanic white), 0.82% (2) black or African-American, 4.1% (10) Native American or Alaska Native, 0.41% (1) Asian, 0.0% (0) Pacific Islander or Native Hawaiian, 0.0% (0) from other races, and 8.2% (20) from two or more races. Hispanic or Latino of any race was 1.23% (3) of the population.

Of the 83 households, 37.3% had children under the age of 18; 39.8% were married couples living together; 19.3% had a female householder with no spouse or partner present. 26.5% of households consisted of individuals and 9.6% had someone living alone who was 65 years of age or older. The average household size was 1.8 and the average family size was 2.9. The percent of those with a bachelor's degree or higher was estimated to be 23.8% of the population.

18.0% of the population was under the age of 18, 7.0% from 18 to 24, 18.4% from 25 to 44, 27.0% from 45 to 64, and 29.5% who were 65 years of age or older. The median age was 54.2 years. For every 100 females, there were 80.7 males. For every 100 females ages 18 and older, there were 86.9 males.

The 2016–2020 5-year American Community Survey estimates show that the median household income was $34,435 (with a margin of error of +/- $21,710) and the median family income was $83,854 (+/- $26,280). The median income for those above 16 years old was $29,097 (+/- $11,195).
