= Crestline, Kansas =

Unincorporated community in Cherokee County, Kansas

- CDP
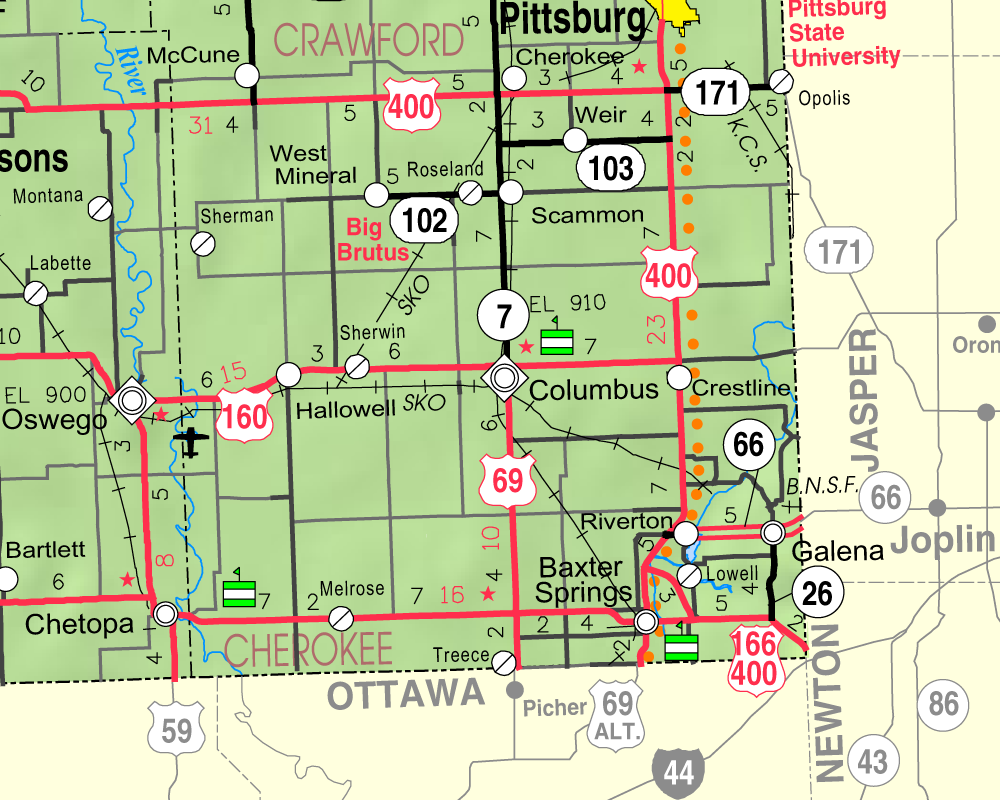
- KDOT map of Cherokee County (legend)

- Location within Kansas Location within the United States
- Coordinates: 37°10′12″N 94°42′23″W
- Country: United States
- State: Kansas
- County: Cherokee
- Elevation: 869 ft (265 m)

Population (2020)
  - Total: 116
- Time zone: UTC-6 (CST)
  - Summer (DST): UTC-5 (CDT)
- ZIP Code: 66728
- Area code: 620
- FIPS code: 20-16325
- GNIS ID: 2806469

Crestline is a census-designated place (CDP) in Cherokee County, Kansas, United States. As of the 2020 census, the population was 116. Crestline is located on U.S. Route 400, 7.5 miles (12.1 km) east of Columbus.

== History ==
Crestline was a station on the St. Louis–San Francisco Railway.

Crestline has a post office with ZIP Code 66728.

== Demographics ==
Historical population
Census	Pop.	Note	%±
2020	116		—
U.S. Decennial Census

The 2020 United States census counted 116 people, 42 households, and 20 families in Crestline. The population density was 65.1 per square mile (25.1/km^{2}). There were 52 housing units at an average density of 29.2 per square mile (11.3/km^{2}). The racial makeup was 81.9% (95) white or European American (81.03% non-Hispanic white), 6.03% (7) black or African-American, 2.59% (3) Native American or Alaska Native, 4.31% (5) Asian, 0.0% (0) Pacific Islander or Native Hawaiian, 0.86% (1) from other races, and 4.31% (5) from two or more races. Hispanic or Latino of any race was 2.59% (3) of the population.

Of the 42 households, 16.7% had children under the age of 18; 38.1% were married couples living together; 31.0% had a female householder with no spouse or partner present. 40.5% of households consisted of individuals and 33.3% had someone living alone who was 65 years of age or older. The average household size was 1.4 and the average family size was 2.1. The percent of those with a bachelor's degree or higher was estimated to be 0.0% of the population.

23.3% of the population was under the age of 18, 6.9% from 18 to 24, 29.3% from 25 to 44, 25.0% from 45 to 64, and 15.5% who were 65 years of age or older. The median age was 37.5 years. For every 100 females, there were 52.6 males. For every 100 females ages 18 and older, there were 50.8 males.

== Education ==
The CDP is in Columbus USD 493.
