= Riverton, Kansas =

Unincorporated community in Cherokee County, Kansas

- CDP
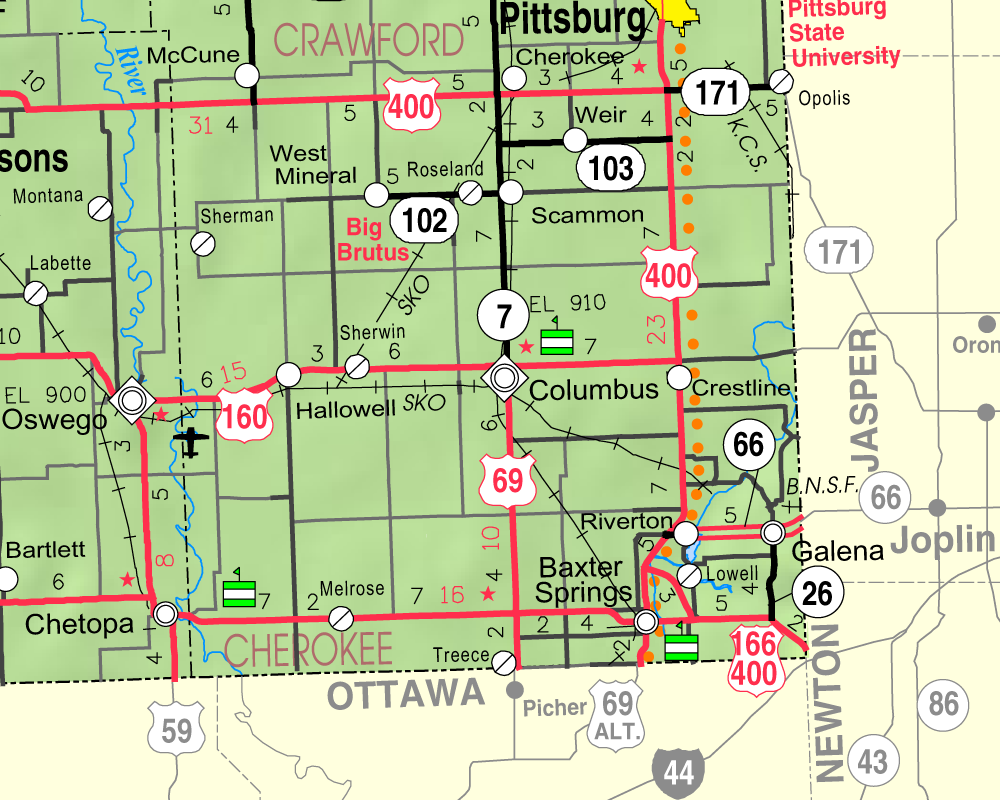
- KDOT map of Cherokee County (legend)

- Location within Kansas Location within the United States
- Coordinates: 37°04′24″N 94°42′22″W
- Country: United States
- State: Kansas
- County: Cherokee

Area
  - Total: 2.30 sq mi (5.95 km^{2})
  - Land: 2.24 sq mi (5.81 km^{2})
  - Water: 0.054 sq mi (0.14 km^{2})
- Elevation: 827 ft (252 m)

Population (2020)
  - Total: 771
  - Density: 344/sq mi (133/km^{2})
- Time zone: UTC-6 (CST)
  - Summer (DST): UTC-5 (CDT)
- ZIP Code: 66770
- Area code: 620
- FIPS code: 20-60200
- GNIS ID: 2629169

Riverton is a census-designated place (CDP) in Cherokee County, Kansas, United States. As of the 2020 census, the population was 771. It is located at the junction of K-66, U.S. Route 69 Alternate (US 69 Alt.), and US 400, near the Spring River.

== History ==
The first post office in Riverton was established in 1919.

== Geography ==
Riverton is located in southeastern Cherokee County near the southeastern corner of Kansas. Along K-66, Galena is 3.5 miles (5.6 km) to the east, and Joplin is 10 miles (16 km) to the east. Pittsburg is 23 miles (37 km) to the north via US 400 and US 69. Baxter Springs is 4.5 miles (7.2 km) to the southwest, and Miami, Oklahoma, is 20 miles (32 km) to the southwest via US 69 Alt..

The eastern and southern edges of the CDP ars formed by the Spring River, which flows south to the Neosho River in Oklahoma. The CDP of Lowell is to the south across the Spring River.

== Demographics ==
Historical population
Census	Pop.	Note	%±
2010	929		—
2020	771		−17.0%
U.S. Decennial Census

Riverton is part of the Joplin Metropolitan Statistical Area (MSA).

== Area attractions ==
The famous Rainbow Bridge, about 2 miles (3 km) west of town, was the site where in the year 2000, musician Brad Paisley performed the song "(Get Your Kicks on) Route 66" for the TLC special "Route 66: Main Street America".

The Eisler Brothers Country Store in Riverton was one of the stops on Pixar's US 66 research trips for the 2006 film Cars. The filmmakers met with Dean Walker, then president of the Kansas Historic Route 66 Association, who is known to twist his feet backwards 180° and walk in reverse. He became one of many inspirations for the Mater character, a rusty old tow truck who teaches NASCAR rookie Lightning McQueen to drive in reverse.

The original boom truck is currently based at a restored Kan-O-Tex Service Station in nearby Galena.

== Education ==
The community is served by Riverton USD 404 public school district.

== Gallery ==
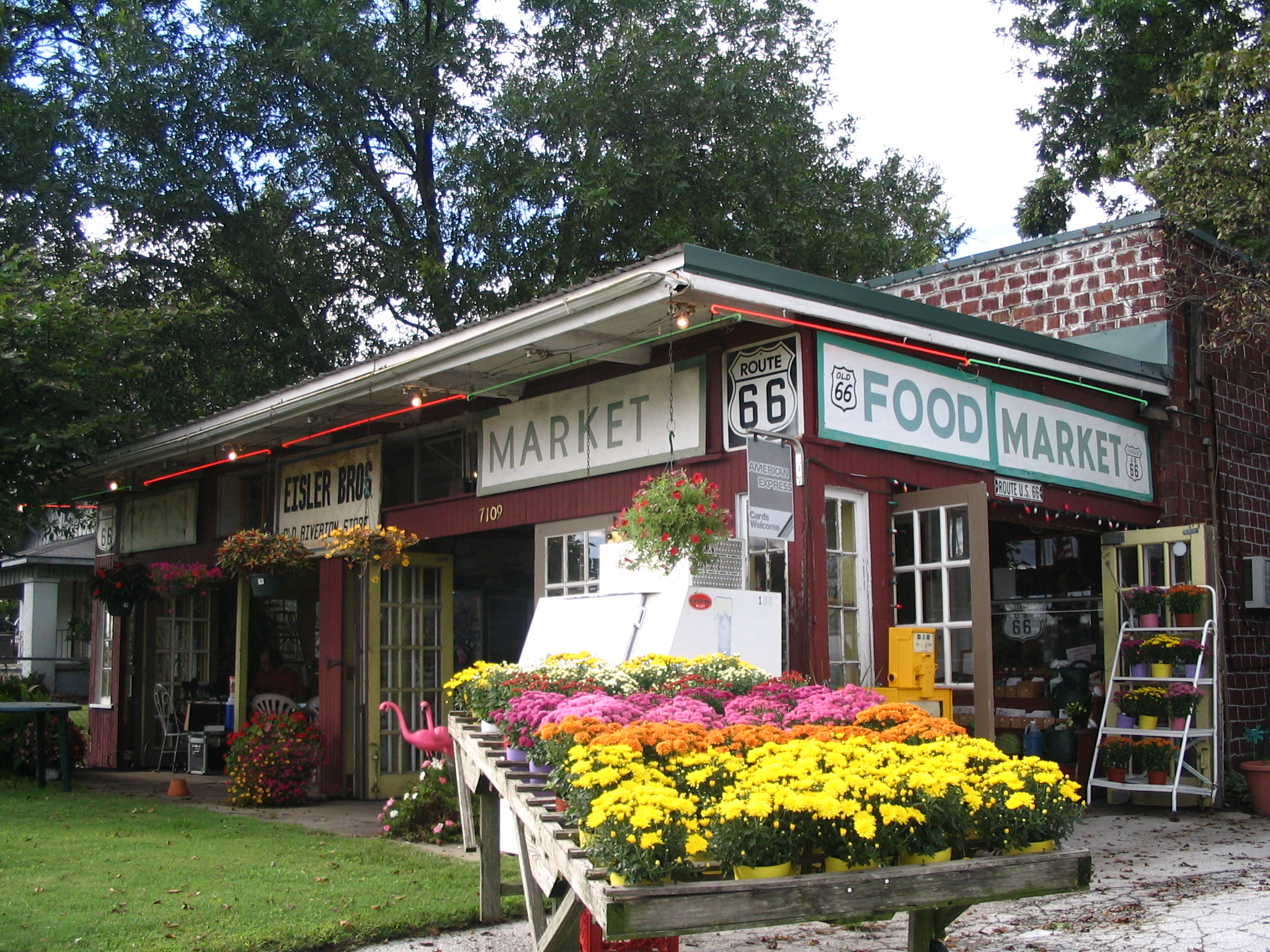
Eisler Brothers Country Store in Riverton, mentioned in the credits for the movie Cars

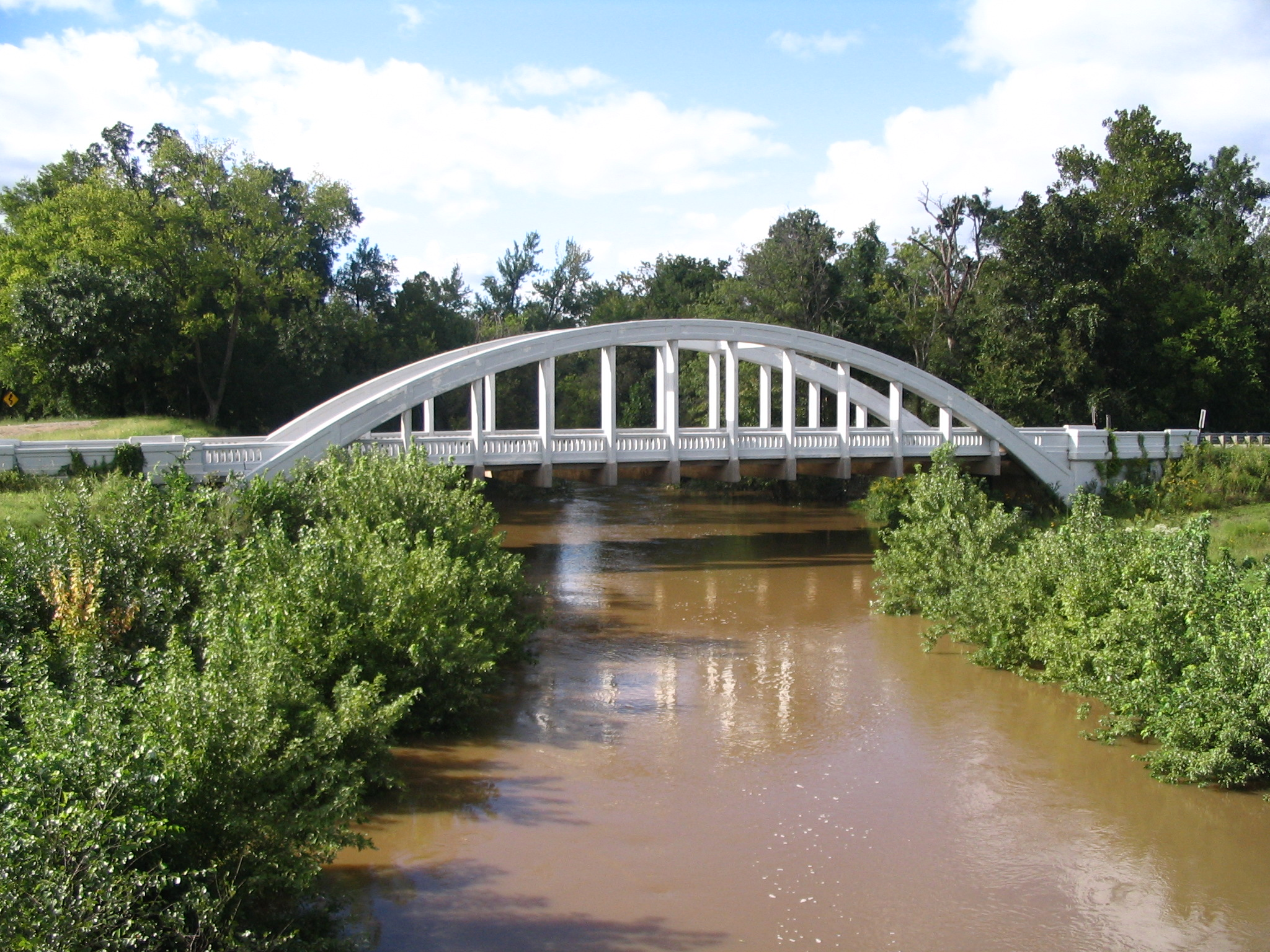
Rainbow Bridge near Riverton, 2008
