= Galena, Kansas =

City in Cherokee County, Kansas

- City
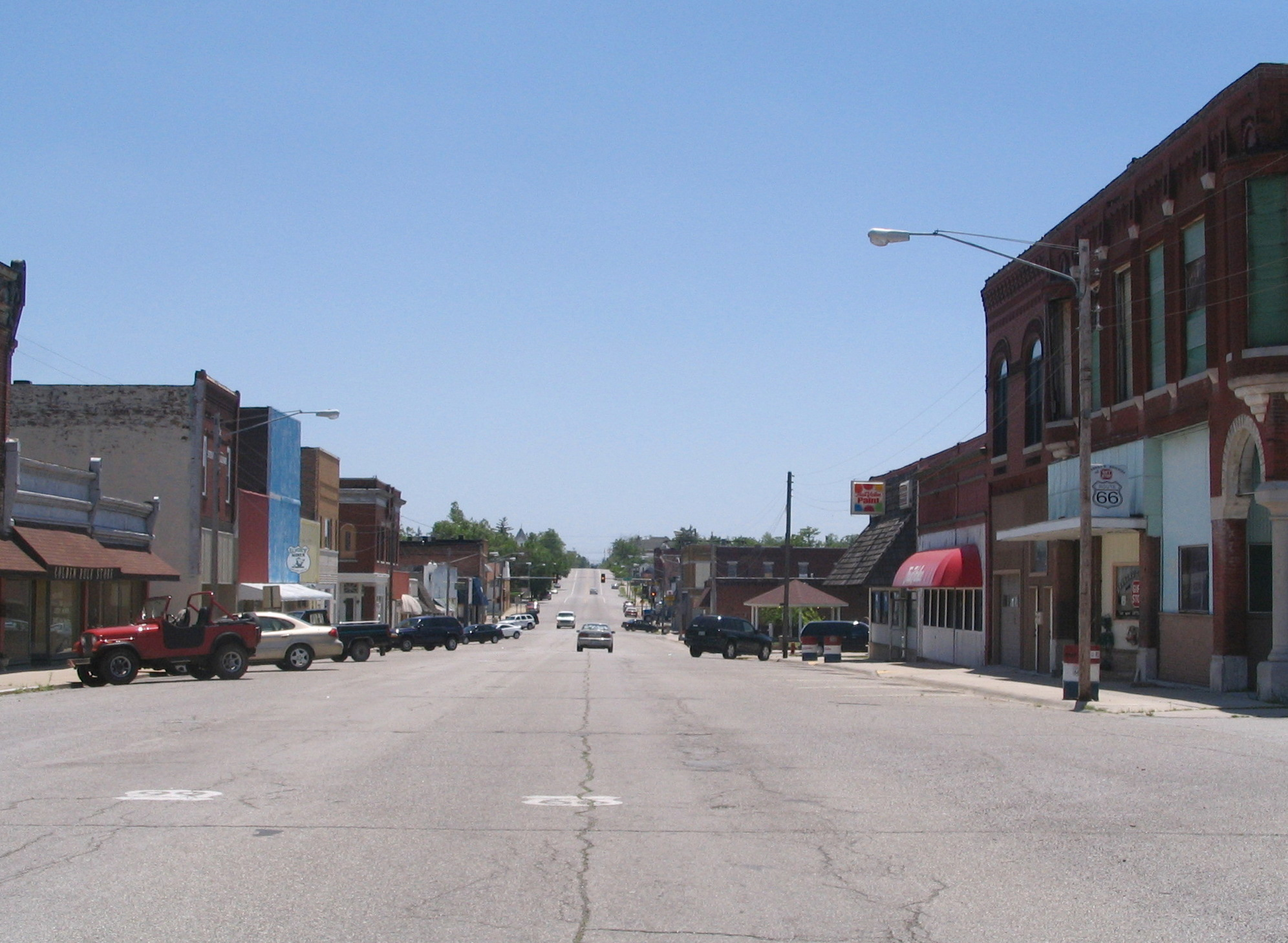
- Downtown Galena (2008)

- Location within Cherokee County and Kansas

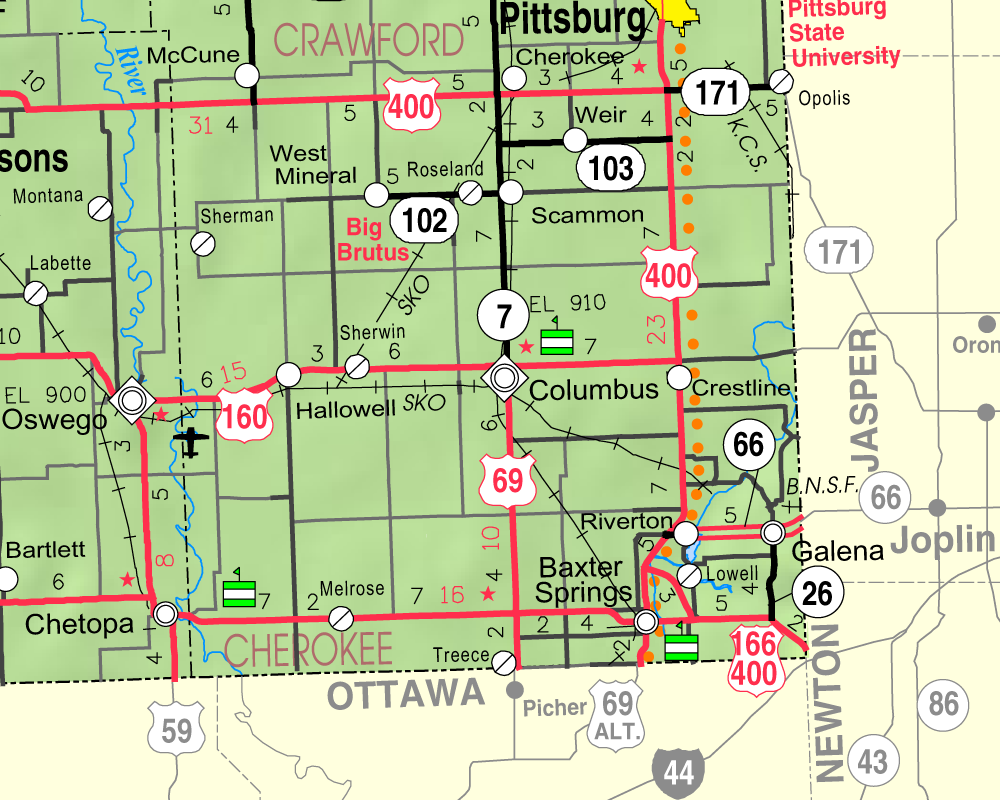
- KDOT map of Cherokee County (legend)
- Coordinates: 37°04′30″N 94°38′07″W
- Country: United States
- State: Kansas
- County: Cherokee
- Founded: 1877
- Incorporated: 1877
- Named for: Galena

Area
  - Total: 4.66 sq mi (12.06 km^{2})
  - Land: 4.60 sq mi (11.92 km^{2})
  - Water: 0.054 sq mi (0.14 km^{2})
- Elevation: 925 ft (282 m)

Population (2020)
  - Total: 2,761
  - Density: 599.9/sq mi (231.6/km^{2})
- Time zone: UTC-6 (CST)
  - Summer (DST): UTC-5 (CDT)
- ZIP Code: 66739
- Area code: 620
- FIPS code: 20-25100
- GNIS ID: 485578
- Website: galenaks.gov

Galena is a city in Cherokee County, Kansas, United States. As of the 2020 census, the population of the city was 2,761.

== History ==
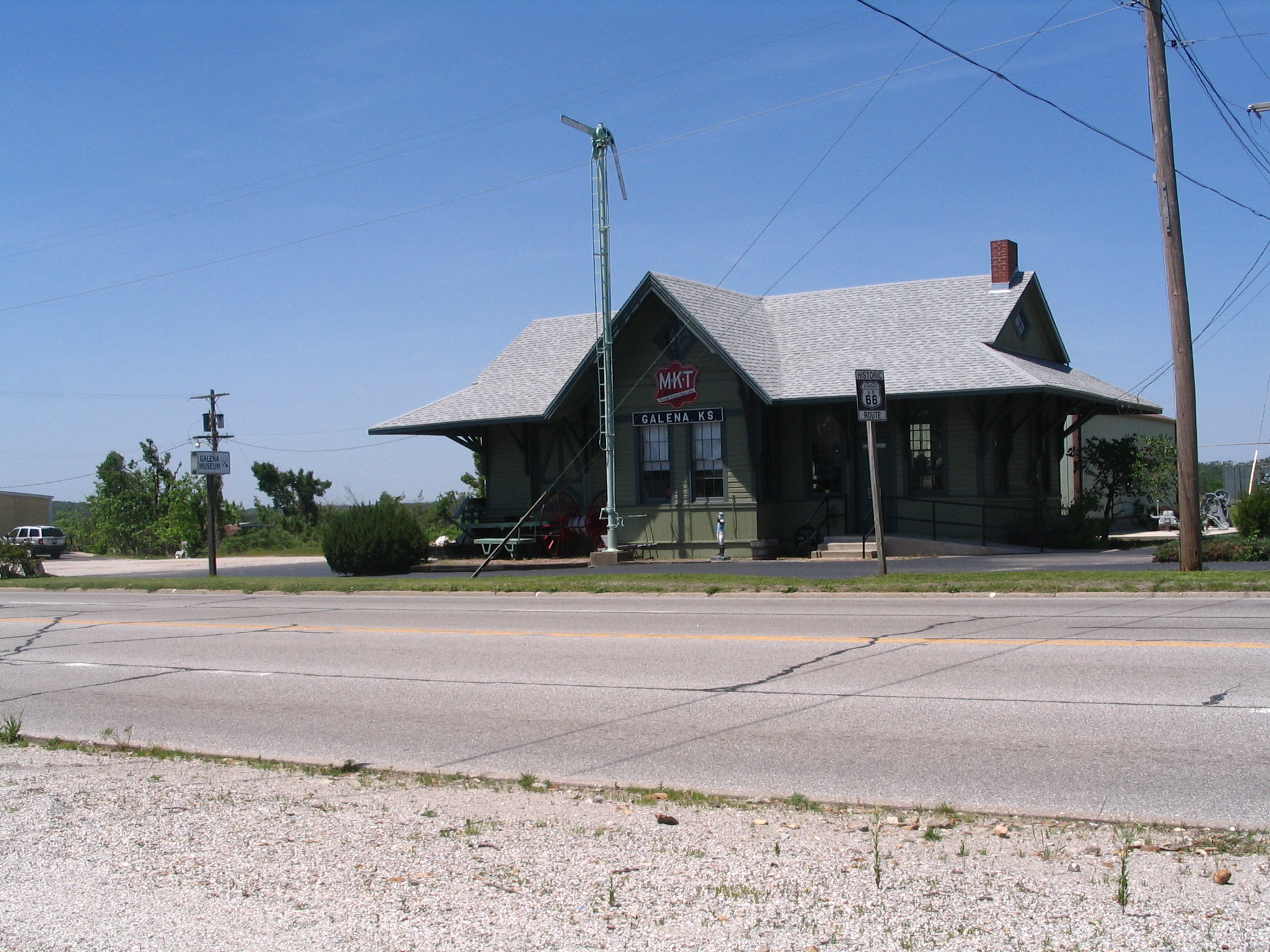
Galena Museum (2008), former Galena train station for the M-K-T railroad.

Although the railroad was built through the territory of Galena in 1871, the community did not start until the discovery of lead there in the spring of 1877. The first post office was established in 1877.

The city was originally platted by the Galena Mining and Smelting Company and was to be known as Cornwall. The city was actually known as Short Creek when first established because of a nearby creek and was known as Bonanza briefly before taking the present name of Galena in 1877, which is named after the lead ore galena found in the area. The city was part of the tri state mining area and had over 30,000 inhabitants. The population decreased after the mines closed in the 1970s.

The Jayhawk Ordnance Works northwest of Galena, built during World War II, was a large ordnance plant producing ammonium nitrate. After the war it was privatized by its operator Kenneth Aldred Spencer and at one point was the world's largest producer of ammonium nitrate fertilizer in the world. It would form the basis for the Spencer Chemical Company's fortune which would eventually be funneled into numerous philanthropies throughout Missouri and Kansas. The Spencer family had been in the area because of their ownership of the Pittsburg & Midway Coal Company mining operation. The plant is still in operation as the Jayhawk Fine Chemicals Corporation now owned by CABB.

== Geography ==
According to the United States Census Bureau, the city has a total area of 4.62 square miles (11.97 km^{2}), of which 4.57 square miles (11.84 km^{2}) is land and 0.05 square miles (0.13 km^{2}) is water. The city itself is located on the Springfield Plateau, and as such is one of the only settlements in Kansas in the Ozark Highlands.

=== Superfund site ===
In 1983 as a result of historic practices involved in the mining and smelting of toxic metals, including the deposition of lead, zinc, antimony and cadmium, the Cherokee County Superfund site was listed on the EPA's National Priorities List (NPL). These sites include the most serious abandoned hazardous waste sites in the United States and represent the priority list for remedial action under the Superfund program. The site consists of approximately 115 square miles, divided into seven subsites including Galena. The Cherokee County site encompasses the Kansas portion of the Tri-State district, the latter including Northeastern Oklahoma and Southwestern Missouri. Acidic waters in mine shafts throughout the site, chat piles, tailings impoundments, and surface waters both in mine pits and streams draining the site contain substantial concentrations of these toxic wastes.

== Demographics ==
Historical population
| Census | Pop. | Note | %± |
|---|---|---|---|
| 1880 | 1,463 | | — |
| 1890 | 2,496 | | 70.6% |
| 1900 | 10,155 | | 306.9% |
| 1910 | 6,096 | | −40.0% |
| 1920 | 4,712 | | −22.7% |
| 1930 | 4,736 | | 0.5% |
| 1940 | 4,375 | | −7.6% |
| 1950 | 4,029 | | −7.9% |
| 1960 | 3,827 | | −5.0% |
| 1970 | 3,712 | | −3.0% |
| 1980 | 3,587 | | −3.4% |
| 1990 | 3,308 | | −7.8% |
| 2000 | 3,287 | | −0.6% |
| 2010 | 3,085 | | −6.1% |
| 2020 | 2,761 | | −10.5% |
U.S. Decennial Census

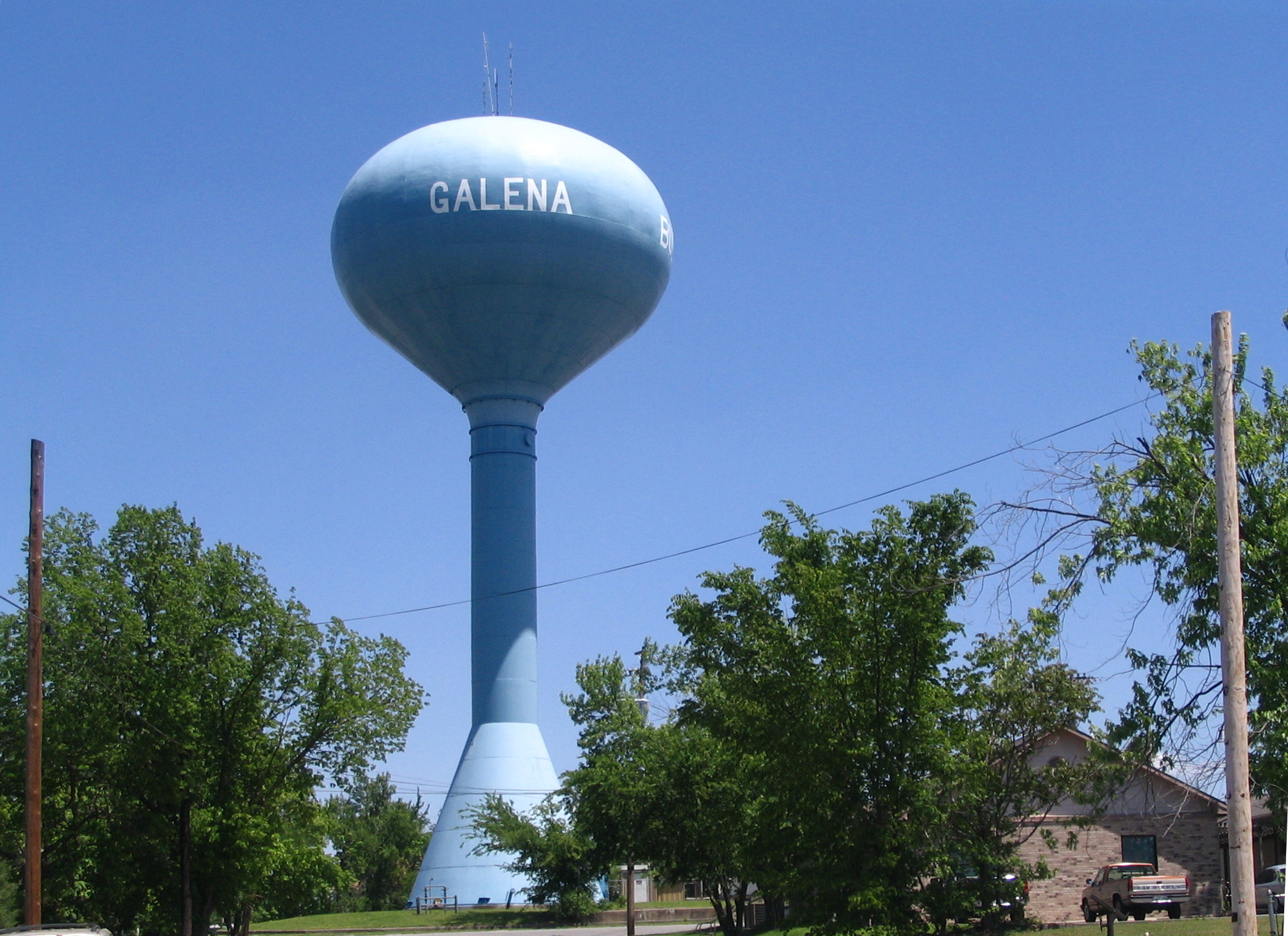
Galena water tower (2008)

The population of Galena has dropped by 73% since 1900.

=== 2020 census ===
As of the 2020 census, Galena had 2,761 residents, 1,096 households, and 699 families. The median age was 40.2 years. 24.6% of residents were under age 18, 7.6% were ages 18 to 24, 24.2% were ages 25 to 44, 24.4% were ages 45 to 64, and 19.1% were age 65 or older. For every 100 females, there were 92.9 males, and for every 100 females age 18 and over, there were 90.4 males.

The population density was 599.8 inhabitants per square mile (231.6/km^{2}), and there were 1,315 housing units at an average density of 285.7 per square mile (110.3/km^{2}). Of residents, 0.0% lived in urban areas and 100.0% lived in rural areas.

Of the 1,096 households, 29.2% had children under the age of 18 living in them. Of all households, 41.0% were married-couple households, 19.3% were households with a male householder and no spouse or partner present, and 31.1% were households with a female householder and no spouse or partner present. About 30.5% of all households were made up of individuals, and 14.6% had someone living alone who was 65 years of age or older. Of all housing units, 16.7% were vacant. The homeowner vacancy rate was 3.0%, and the rental vacancy rate was 14.4%.

Racial composition as of the 2020 census
| Race | Number | Percent |
|---|---|---|
| White | 2,350 | 85.1% |
| Black or African American | 21 | 0.8% |
| American Indian and Alaska Native | 93 | 3.4% |
| Asian | 8 | 0.3% |
| Native Hawaiian and Other Pacific Islander | 5 | 0.2% |
| Some other race | 26 | 0.9% |
| Two or more races | 258 | 9.3% |
| Hispanic or Latino (of any race) | 90 | 3.3% |

83.56% of residents were non-Hispanic white.

=== Income and poverty ===
The 2016–2020 5-year American Community Survey estimates show that the median household income was $30,649 (with a margin of error of +/- $4,806) and the median family income was $50,462 (+/- $10,225). Males had a median income of $30,745 (+/- $11,631) versus $25,025 (+/- $2,900) for females. The median income for those above 16 years old was $26,133 (+/- $4,284). Approximately, 21.4% of families and 21.6% of the population were below the poverty line, including 26.3% of those under the age of 18 and 15.8% of those ages 65 or over.

=== Demographic estimates ===
The percent of those with a bachelor's degree or higher was estimated to be 11.4% of the population. The average household size was 2.3 and the average family size was 3.3.

=== 2010 census ===
As of the census of 2010, there were 3,085 people, 1,198 households, and 792 families living in the city. The population density was 675.1 inhabitants per square mile (260.7/km^{2}). There were 1,429 housing units at an average density of 312.7 per square mile (120.7/km^{2}). The racial makeup of the city was 91.0% White, 0.4% African American, 3.0% Native American, 0.3% Asian, 1.3% from other races, and 4.1% from two or more races. Hispanic or Latino of any race were 3.6% of the population.

There were 1,198 households, of which 34.1% had children under the age of 18 living with them, 43.2% were married couples living together, 16.4% had a female householder with no husband present, 6.6% had a male householder with no wife present, and 33.9% were non-families. 29.0% of all households were made up of individuals, and 13% had someone living alone who was 65 years of age or older. The average household size was 2.51 and the average family size was 3.04.

The median age in the city was 39.1 years. 25.9% of residents were under the age of 18; 8.2% were between the ages of 18 and 24; 22.7% were from 25 to 44; 27.2% were from 45 to 64; and 15.9% were 65 years of age or older. The gender makeup of the city was 49.3% male and 50.7% female.

== Education ==
The community is served by Galena USD 499 public school district. Galena is home to Galena High School. In 1916 the Kansas Supreme Court heard a case where the school superintendent separated the African American ("colored") children and had them taught together from various grades by an African American teacher. The court rejected the district's decision making and requires students of different backgrounds be taught together.

== In the media ==
- Galena is home to the International Harvester L-170 truck that became the inspiration for the character "Mater" in Disney's Cars. The truck sits at 119 N. Main St. outside of the Cars on the Route diner and souvenir store, a restored Kan-O-Tex Service Station.
- There are several museums in Galena such as the Galena Mining and Historical Museum located at 319 West 7th Street (Route 66) in Galena. According to the museum's Facebook page, the building is an Old Katy Railroad Depot which was moved to its current location on 7th Street in 1983. The museum opened in 1984 with a 42 × 42 ft annex added in 1988, and then another 42 × 42 ft annex added in 2010. The museum is home to mining, school, Route 66 and historic memorabilia of city of Galena. It features a 1919 Model T Touring Car; a 1924 Model T Roadster; a 1931 Model A 2 1/2-ton Truck as part of its many exhibits.

== Notable people ==
- James Corman (1920–2000), California politician
- George Grantham (1900–1954), MLB player
- Richard Hilderbrand, member of the Kansas Senate
- Jake LaTurner (born 1988), U.S. representative for Kansas's 2nd congressional district
