= U.S. Route 54 =

Highway in the United States

U.S. Route 54
- US 54 highlighted in red

Route information
- Length: 1,197 mi (1,926 km)
- Existed: 1926–present

Major junctions
- West end: Loop 375 in El Paso, TX
- I-10 / US 180 in El Paso, TX; I-40 / US 84 in Santa Rosa, NM; US 287 in Stratford, TX; US 64 from Guymon to Hooker, OK; US 400 in Mullinville, KS; I-135 / US 81 in Wichita, KS; I-35 in Wichita, KS; US 400 in Spring Township, KS; I-49 / US 71 in Nevada, MO; I-70 / US 40 in Kingdom City, MO
- East end: I-72 / US 36 / IL 107 in Griggsville, IL

Location
- Country: United States
- States: Texas, New Mexico, Oklahoma, Kansas, Missouri, Illinois

Highway system
- United States Numbered Highway System; List; Special; Divided
← US 53	→ US 55

U.S. Route 54 (US 54) is an east–west United States Highway that runs northeast–southwest for 1,197 miles (1,926 km) from El Paso, Texas, to Griggsville, Illinois. The Union Pacific Railroad's Tucumcari Line (former Southern Pacific and Rock Island Lines "Golden State Route") runs parallel to US 54 from El Paso to Pratt, Kansas, which comprises about two-thirds of the route.

The highway's western terminus is in the city of El Paso, near the Mexican border and the eastern terminus is at Interstate 72 (I-72) in Griggsville. The highway is signed North-South in Texas and New Mexico reflecting its directional orientation and East-West the remainder of its course.

== Route description ==
Lengths
	mi	km
TX (El Paso)	20	32
NM	355	571
TX (Panhandle)	92	148
OK	56	90
KS	380	610
MO	279	449
IL	24	39
Total	1,206	1,941

=== Texas (El Paso) ===
US 54 begins in El Paso at Loop 375 downtown (US 54/Patriot Freeway). The highway serves as a major freeway for the Metro area's network, running north–south along the city's eastern slope of the Franklin Mountains range. The highway runs through the city for approximately 20 miles (32 km) before reaching the New Mexico state line. Within the network, it is a military connector for Fort Bliss and Holloman Air Force Base.

=== New Mexico ===
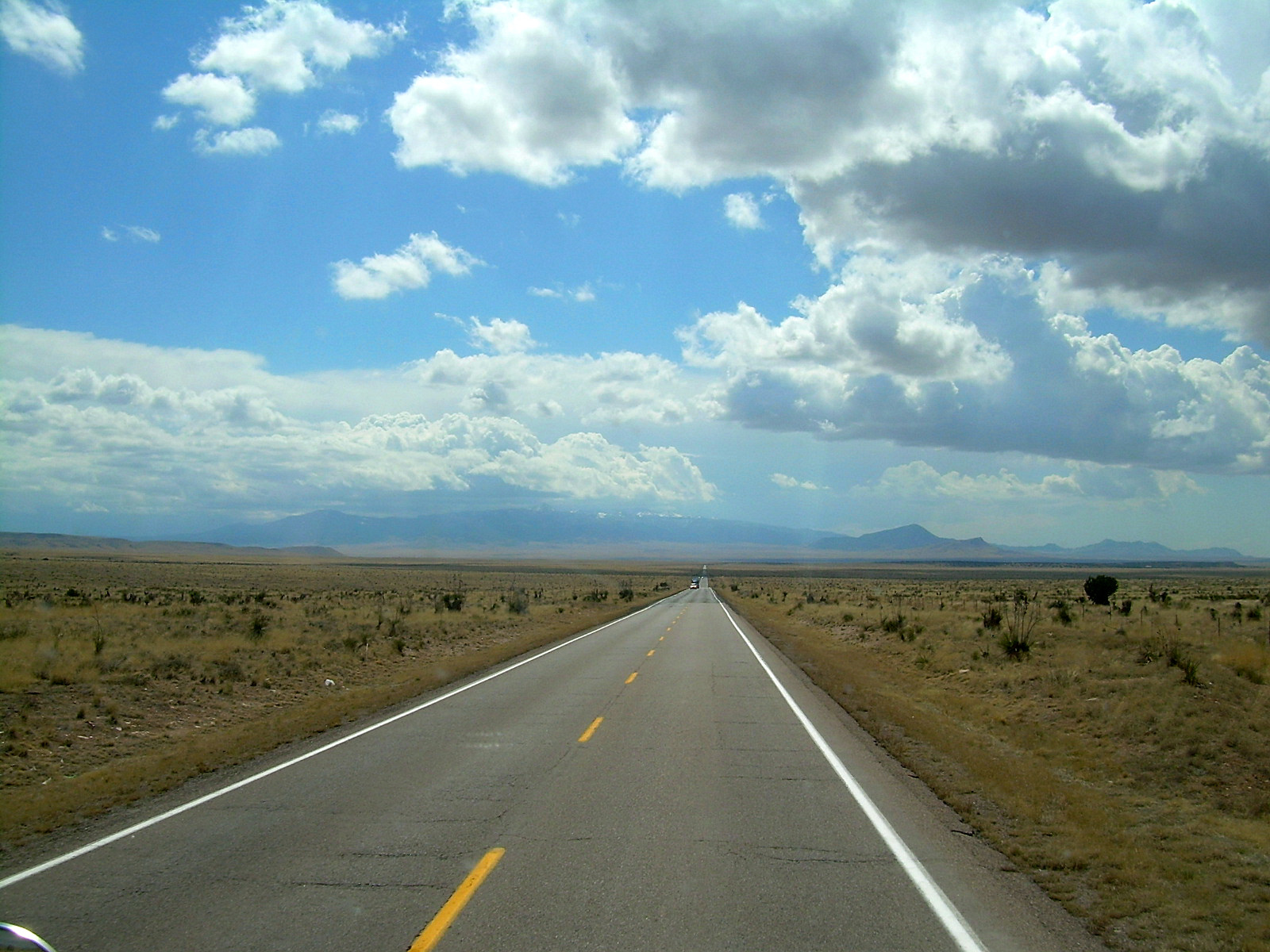
US Route 54 through New Mexico

US 54 enters New Mexico in Chaparral as part of the El Paso, Texas Metro area network. It also serves as a military highway to connect Fort Bliss in El Paso to Holloman Air Force Base in Alamogordo, New Mexico (via U.S. Route 70). The speed limit is 75 mph on the divided highway section upon entering the state to approximately 10 miles (16 km) south of Alamogordo, with a 35 mph zone in Orogrande. Upon entering Alamogordo, US 54 becomes concurrent with U.S. Route 70. US 54/US 70 then intersects the beginning of U.S. Route 82 at the north end of Alamogordo (near La Luz). The limit is 60 mph from Alamogordo to Tularosa and 55 mph north of Tularosa, where the concurrency with US 70 ends, and the highway reverts to being two lanes wide and not divided. The highway runs north through the central portion of the state, passing through Carrizozo and intersecting U.S. Route 380. The route then turns northeast before passing through Vaughn. Upon entering Vaughn, the route is briefly concurrent with U.S. Route 60 and U.S. Route 285. In Vaughn, US 285 splits off to the south. Exiting Vaughn, US 60 splits off to the southeast, and the route continues northeast to Santa Rosa where it becomes concurrent with Interstate 40. The I-40 concurrency lasts for 59 miles (95 km) to Tucumcari. The highway then exits the state back into Texas at Nara Visa. The highway runs for 354 miles (570 km) in New Mexico, and is signed as a north–south route through the state.

=== Texas (Panhandle) ===
The highway re-enters the Texas Panhandle just beyond Nara Visa, New Mexico, and continues northeast for 92 miles (148 km) to the Oklahoma border. Major Texas cities along US 54 in the panhandle are Dalhart and Stratford.

=== Oklahoma ===
US 54 runs through the Oklahoma Panhandle from southwest to northeast. It enters at Texhoma, then continues northeast through Goodwell before entering Guymon. In Guymon, it intersects US 412 and begins a concurrency with US-64. It goes northeast through Optima and Hooker, where US 64 turns east. After going northeast through Tyrone, it enters Kansas just before entering Liberal, Kansas.

=== Kansas ===
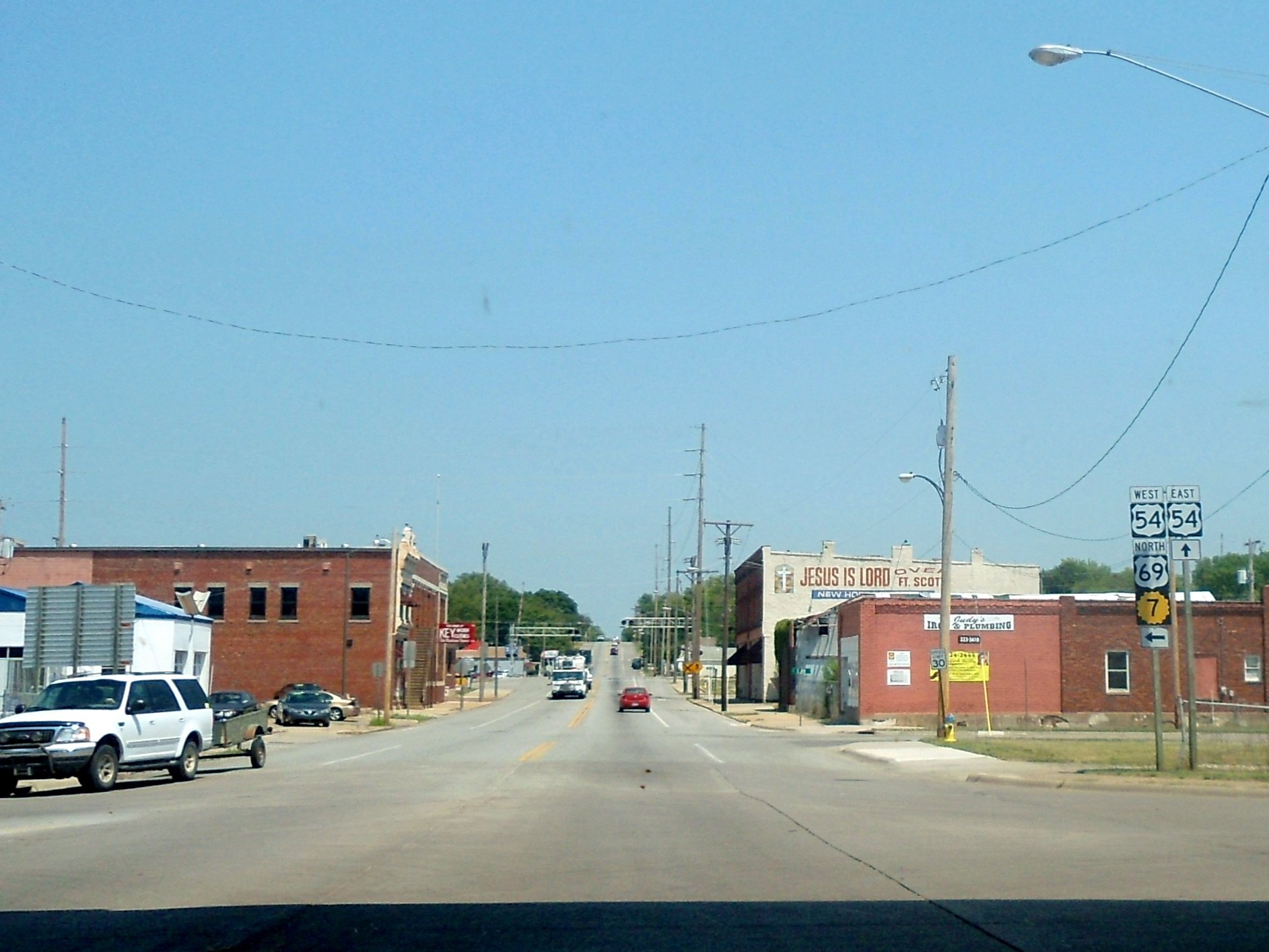
US 54 intersects US 69/K-7 in Fort Scott, KS

US 54 enters the state from Oklahoma in Seward County, and travels through the cities of Liberal and Plains, where it runs concurrently with US 160 in Meade County. Just east of the city of Meade, US 54 splits from US 160 and continues in a northeasterly direction through Meade and Ford counties before beginning a long concurrency with US 400 in Mullinville in Kiowa County.

The highway then travels through the town of Greensburg and continues as a two-lane road through Pratt, Cunningham, and Kingman. At Pratt, the Union Pacific railroad tracks which paralleled the highway for over 600 miles (970 km) from El Paso turn to the northeast (towards Topeka) and leave US 54. The road becomes a divided highway in eastern Kingman County. From Kingman to Garden Plain in Sedgwick County it is a freeway but becomes an at-grade expressway as it passes through Goddard and approaches Wichita.

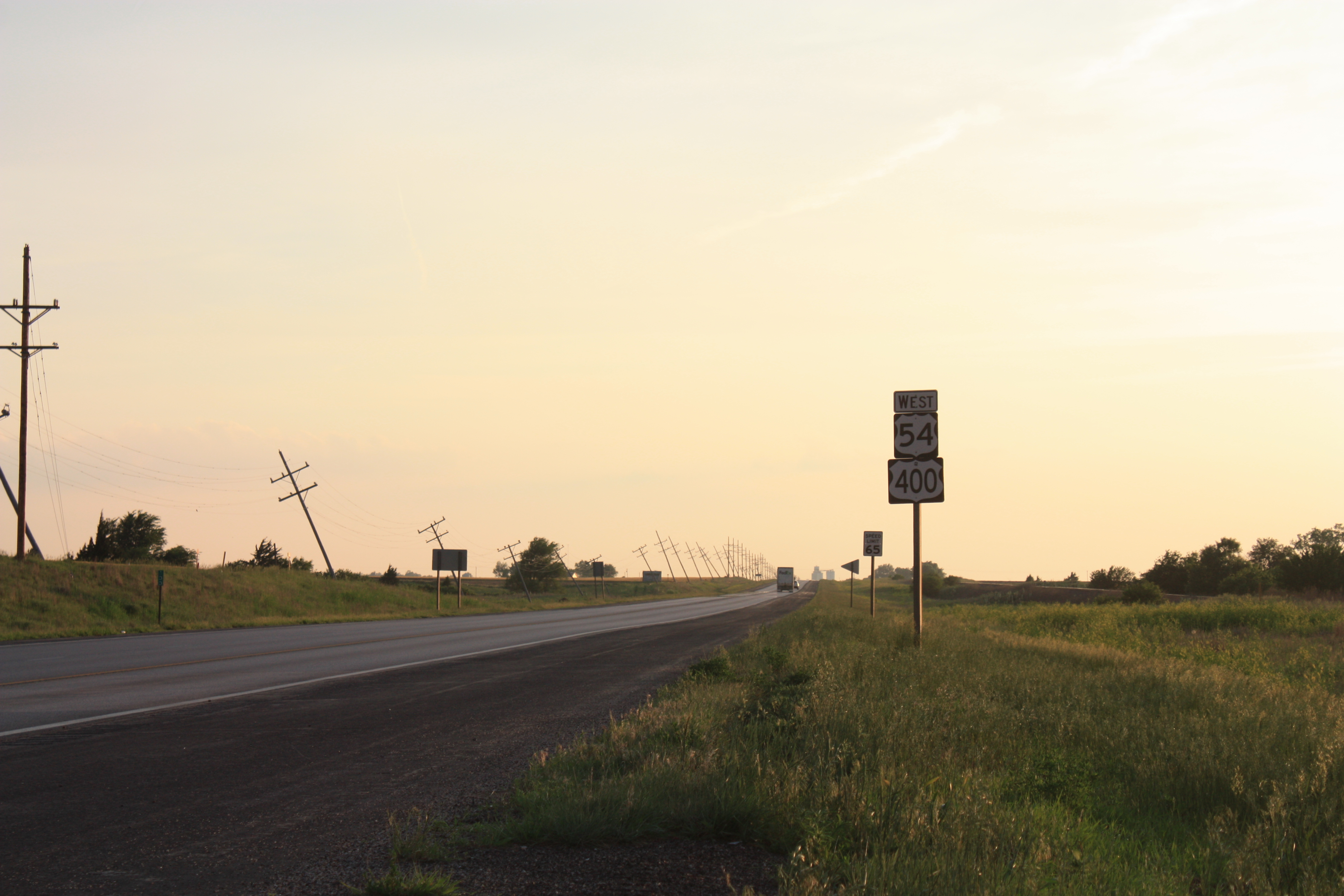
US 54/US 400 a few miles west of Pratt, Kansas

The freeway resumes as the road crosses the city limits of Wichita near Wichita Dwight D. Eisenhower National Airport. In Wichita, US 54/US 400 is known as Kellogg Avenue, and has junctions with I-235, I-135 and I-35, the Kansas Turnpike, before a junction with K-96. The Kellogg Avenue freeway has six lanes and extends 15 miles (24 km) from 111th Street on the west side of Wichita to Zelta just after the I-35/Kansas Turnpike interchange on the east side. Upgrading of Kellogg Avenue from a surface arterial to a freeway has been underway since the mid-1980s, with the latest interchange project opening in late 2019. The road gets its name from Milo Bailey Kellogg, a shopkeeper and Civil War veteran who was the city's first civilian postmaster in 1870.

The concurrency of US 54 and US 400 continues through Augusta in Butler County before US 400 heads east toward the Missouri state line, while US 54 forms a brief concurrency with US 77 through El Dorado. At El Dorado, US 54 continues its easterly course through rural areas in Greenwood and Woodson counties before passing through the cities of Iola and Fort Scott; US 77 heads north to Junction City. US 54 exits Kansas in Bourbon County before reaching Nevada, Missouri.

=== Missouri ===
In Missouri, US 54 runs from the southwest portion of the state to the northeast. It is a major conduit through the Ozarks and is the primary access road to Pomme de Terre Lake and Lake of the Ozarks. After entering the state it passes through Nevada, El Dorado Springs, Hermitage, crossing Lake of the Ozarks the first time just north of Ha Ha Tonka State Park. It passes through Camdenton and crosses the lake a second time on the Grand Glaize Bridge at Osage Beach before bypassing Eldon and going through Jefferson City, where it crosses the Missouri River via the Jefferson City Bridge and briefly overlaps U.S. Route 63. Just north of the bridge, it splits passing through Fulton, crossing Interstate 70 at Kingdom City, bypassing Mexico, sharing a concurrency with Highway 19 through Laddonia, passing just north of Vandalia, and ultimately crossing the Mississippi River via the Champ Clark Bridge into Illinois at Louisiana.

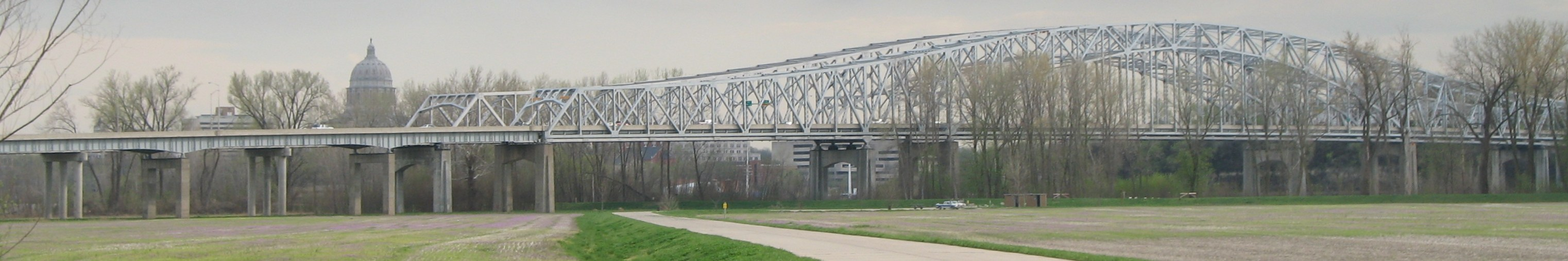
Jefferson City Bridge

=== Illinois ===
In the state of Illinois, U.S. 54 runs from the Champ Clark Bridge over the Mississippi River to its terminus at Interstate 72 southwest of Griggsville. Before the eastern terminus was cut back to I-72, U.S. 54 continued northeast via several existing roads, including the current Illinois Route 54, Illinois Route 50, and Governors' Highway, into downtown Chicago, where it ended at Michigan Avenue and Lake Shore Drive. It is a rural, two-lane surface street for its entire length in Illinois. In the state of Illinois, U.S. 54 is 23.96 miles (38.56 km) long.

== History ==
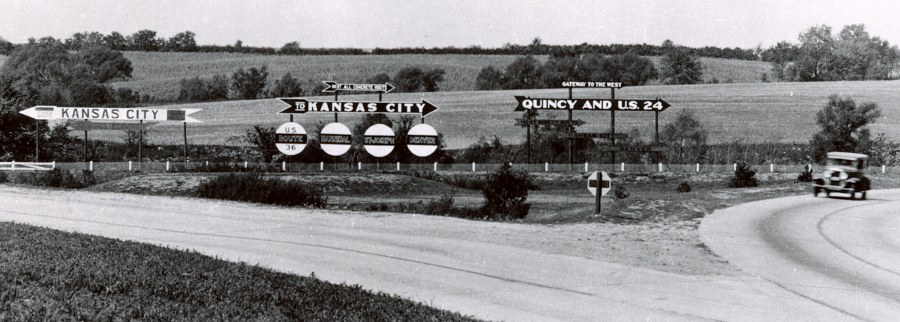
Junction of former US 36 and existing route to Kansas City, Missouri. In the present day, US 54 follows the old route to Kansas City. Illinois Route 106 follows the old route of US 36.

=== Illinois ===
Initially, US 54 ended at the junction of present-day IL 106 (former portion of US 36). In 1935, it replaced a portion of IL 107 between Louisiana, Missouri and New Hartford, Illinois. From 1942 to 1971, US 54 reached downtown Chicago. It then got truncated back to its previous northern terminus. This was in favor of portions of US 36, Illinois Route 54, US 45, Illinois Route 50, Governors Highway, Wood Street, 127th Street, Halsted Street, Vincennes Avenue, State Street, and Michigan Avenue. The four-lane section of U.S. 36 northeast of Pittsfield now also carries Interstate 72 east to Springfield. As of 1992, US 54 was extended northeast to US 36 and present-day I-72 (exit 35). That same year, the section of road that once carried Illinois Route 54 through Springfield is no longer designated as a numbered highway. Now Illinois Route 54 starts at the Interstate 55 exit and goes northeast to Onarga, where it ends at U.S. Route 45. US 54 once joined with US 45 to Kankakee, but that highway is now designated as US 45 alone to Gilman, then US 45 and US 24 through Gilman, then US 45 alone again until a four-way intersection with U.S. Route 52 and Illinois Route 49, and US 45 and US 52 through Kankakee. Between Kankakee and Monee, the section that once carried US 54 is now marked as Illinois Route 50.

== Major intersections ==
Texas
Loop 375 in El Paso
US 62 in El Paso
I-110 in El Paso
I-10 / US 180 in El Paso

New Mexico
US 70 in Alamogordo. The highways travel concurrently to Tularosa.
US 82 in Alamogordo
US 380 in Carrizozo
US 60 / US 285 southwest of Vaughn. The highways travel concurrently to southeast of Vaughn.
US 84 in Santa Rosa. The highways travel concurrently through the city.
I-40 / US 84 in Santa Rosa. I-40/US 54 travels concurrently to Tucumcari.
US 84 in Santa Rosa
Texas
US 87 / US 385 in Dalhart
US 287 in Stratford

Oklahoma
US 412 in Guymon. The highways travel concurrently through the city.
US 64 in Guymon. The highways travel concurrently to Hooker.

Kansas
US 83 / US 270 in Liberal
US 160 east of Plains. The highways travel concurrently to east of Meade.
US 283 in Minneola
US 400 east of Mullinville. The highways travel concurrently to Pickrell Corner.
US 183 west of Greensburg
US 281 in Pratt
I-235 in Wichita
I-135 / US 81 in Wichita
I-35 in Wichita
US 77 in Augusta. The highways travel concurrently to El Dorado.
US 75 in Yates Center
US 169 east of Iola
US 59 in Moran
US 69 north of Fort Scott. The highways travel concurrently to Fort Scott.

Missouri
I-49 / US 71 in Nevada
US 65 in Preston
US 50 / US 63 in Jefferson City. US 54/US 63 travels concurrently through the city.
I-70 / US 40 in Kingdom City
US 61 north of Bowling Green

Illinois
I-72 / US 36 in Griggsville Township
IL 107 in Griggsville Township

== Related route ==
- U.S. Highway 154

== See also ==
Browse numbered routes
← FM 53	TX	→ SH 54
← SH-53	OK	→ SH-54
← K-53	KS	→ K-55
← Route 53	MO	→ I-55
← IL 53	IL	→ IL 54
