= U.S. Route 54 in Kansas =

Section of U.S. Highway in Kansas

U.S. Highway 54
- US 54 highlighted in red

Route information
- Maintained by KDOT
- Length: 378.22 mi (608.69 km)

Major junctions
- West end: US 54 at the Oklahoma state line near Liberal
- US-83 / US-270 in Liberal; US-160 near Meade; US-400 near Bucklin; US-281 in Pratt; I-235 in Wichita; I-135 / US-81 / K-15 in Wichita; I-35 / Kansas Turnpike in Wichita; US-77 in Augusta; US-59 in Moran; US-69 / K-7 in Fort Scott
- East end: US 54 at the Missouri state line near Fort Scott

Location
- Country: United States
- State: Kansas
- Counties: Seward, Meade, Clark, Ford, Kiowa, Pratt, Kingman, Sedgwick, Butler, Greenwood, Woodson, Allen, Bourbon

Highway system
- United States Numbered Highway System; List; Special; Divided; Kansas State Highway System; Interstate; US; State; Spurs
← K-53	→ K-55
← K-41	→ K-41

U.S. Route 54 (US 54) is a part of the U.S. Highway System that runs from El Paso, Texas, to Interstate 72 (I-72) in Griggsville, Illinois. In the U.S. state of Kansas, US 54 is a main east–west highway that runs from the Oklahoma border east to the Missouri border.

== Route description ==
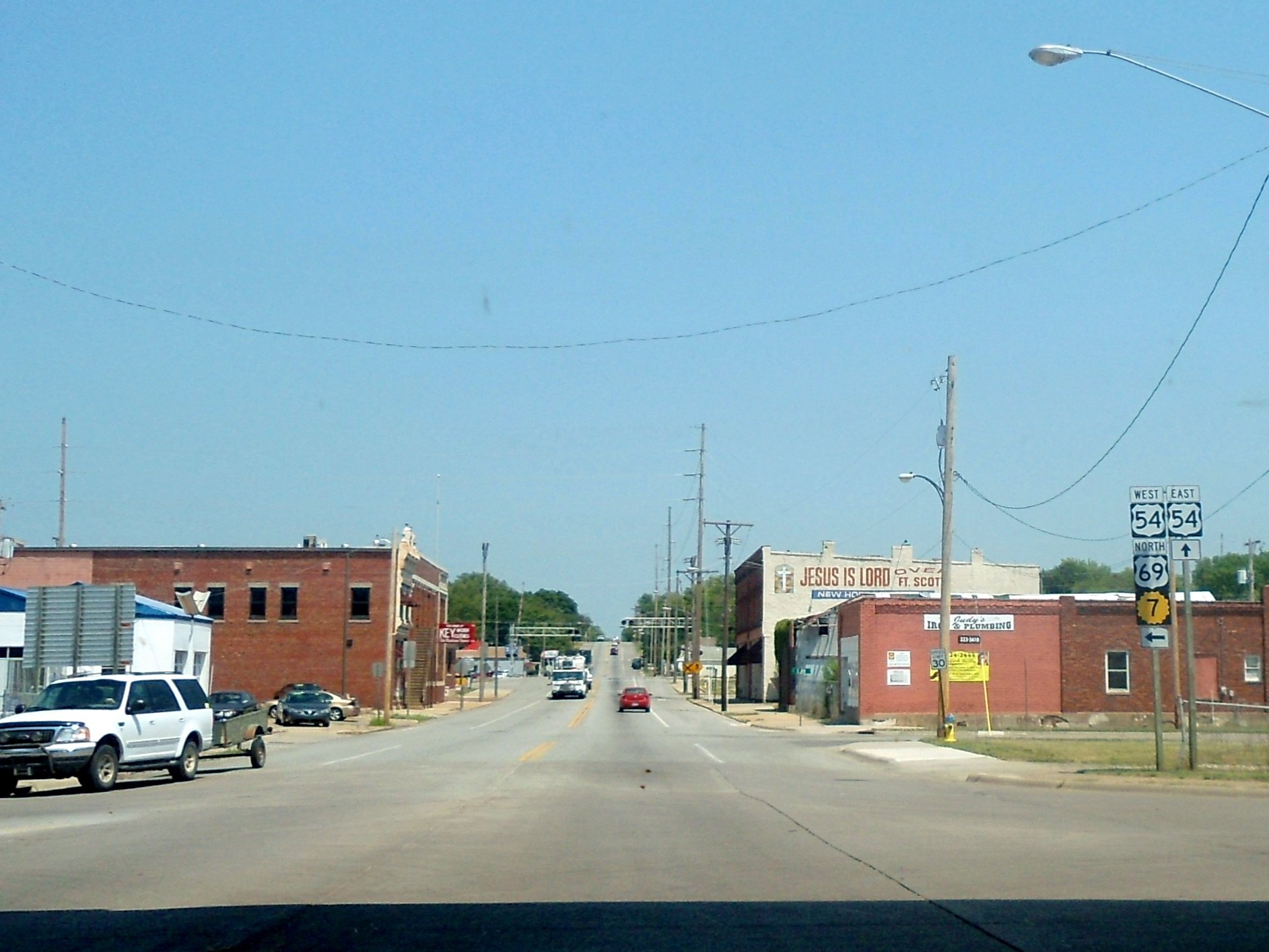
US 54 intersects US 69/K-7 in Fort Scott, KS

US 54 enters the state from Oklahoma in Seward County, and travels through the cities of Liberal and Plains, where it runs concurrently with US 160 in Meade County. Just east of the city of Meade, US 54 splits from US 160 and continues in a northeasterly direction through Meade and Ford counties before beginning a long concurrency with US 400 in Mullinville in Kiowa County.

The highway then travels through the town of Greensburg and continues as a two-lane road through Pratt, Cunningham, and Kingman. At Pratt, the Union Pacific railroad tracks which paralleled the highway for over 600 miles (970 km) from El Paso turn to the northeast (towards Topeka) and leave US 54. The road becomes a divided highway in eastern Kingman County. From Kingman to Garden Plain in Sedgwick County it is a freeway but becomes an at-grade expressway as it passes through Goddard and approaches Wichita.

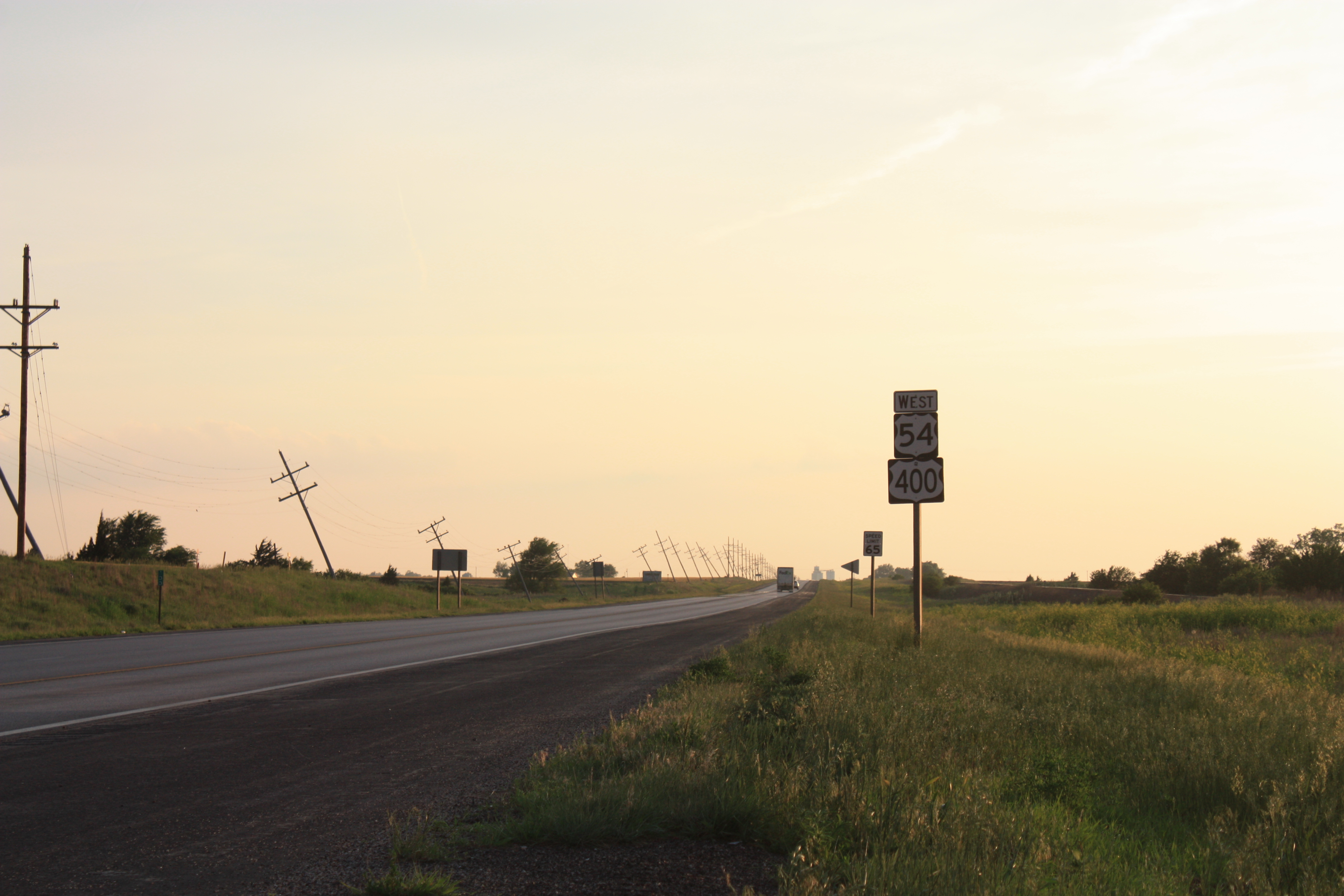
US 54/US 400 a few miles west of Pratt, Kansas

The freeway resumes as the road crosses the city limits of Wichita near Wichita Dwight D. Eisenhower National Airport. In Wichita, US 54/US 400 is known as Kellogg Avenue, and has junctions with I-235, I-135 and I-35, the Kansas Turnpike, before a junction with K-96. The Kellogg Avenue freeway has six lanes and extends 16 miles (26 km) from 111th Street on the west side of Wichita to Zelta just before the I-35/Kansas Turnpike interchange on the east side. Upgrading of Kellogg Avenue from a surface arterial to a freeway has been underway since the mid-1980s, with the latest interchange project opening in late 2019. The road gets its name from Milo Bailey Kellogg, a shopkeeper and Civil War veteran who was the city's first civilian postmaster in 1870.

The concurrency of US 54 and US 400 continues through Augusta in Butler County before US 400 heads east toward the Missouri state line, while US 54 forms a brief concurrency with US 77 through El Dorado. At El Dorado, US 54 continues its easterly course through rural areas in Greenwood and Woodson counties before passing through the cities of Iola and Fort Scott; US 77 heads north to Junction City. US 54 exits Kansas in Bourbon County before reaching Nevada, Missouri.

== History ==
K-41
- Existed: 1926–1927

On March 6, 2020, work began on a $27.6 million project to expand US-54 from two lanes to a four-lane divided limited access expressway, an additional three miles east from Liberal. Koss Construction Company of Topeka is the main contractor of this project.

Construction on the first section of the East Kellogg project started in August 2015. The project included a redesigned intersection with Webb Road and widened US-54 and US-400 from four lanes to six lanes from Webb Road to Greenwich Road despite the phenomenon of induced demand. Construction on a second project began in 2016, to continue widening the highway to a six-lane freeway between Greenwich Road and K-96. Also new bridges will be built over I-35/KTA, new ramps will be constructed from southbound I-35/KTA to westbound US-54/US-400 and from eastbound US-54/US-400 to both northbound and southbound I-35/KTA. In addition, two-lane one way frontage roads on each side of the freeway will be built. Construction for both projects should be completed by late 2021. A two-mile section of the new highway, from Eastern Street to the K-96 junction, opened on November 21, 2019. On April 16, 2020, vandals damaged an estimated $50,000 worth of construction equipment, which included a bulldozer, excavator and an off-road vehicle.

In the 2020s, the US 54 corridor from Mullinville to Augusta was designated as an Alternative Fuel Corridor for electric vehicles.

== Future ==
=== Northwest Bypass ===
The state is studying a northwestern bypass of Wichita, which would redesignate K-254 as US-54.

The bypass would run for 12 miles from K-96 at Tyler Road to US 400/US 54/Kellogg Avenue near 183rd Street. The project would consume 1,334 acres of prime farmland. KDOT began purchasing right-of-way in 2006 and by 2023, one third of the right-of-way had been acquired. By 2025, this had risen to 40%. Sedgwick County had provided a $1 million per year subsidy to purchase right-of way, with Maize and Goddard each spending $5,000 annually on the right-of-way. By the end of 2025, local governments had spent $14 million with KDOT spending an additional $14 million on right-of-way.

By this time, project costs had more than doubled to over $1 billion with an estimated economic impact of only $900 million. For this reason among others, the project has lost the support of KDOT and has only received support from west Sedgwick County suburban communities. At the end of 2025, KDOT began to put together a new feasibility study for the corridor to evaluate future options.

=== East Kellogg Project ===
On March 23, 2026, construction began on the easternmost portion of US 54 in Sedgwick County, referred to by the Kansas Department of Transportation (KDOT) as the East Kellogg Project. This segment, extending from K‑96 to 159th Street East, is being rebuilt as a grade-separated, controlled-access roadway and is anticipated to be completed in 2029. As of the start of construction, the project represents the largest let construction contract in Kansas history. The project will require a $288 million subsidy to complete.

=== West Kellogg Project ===
The West Kellogg Road Project is a planned westward expansion of controlled-access US 54 from Maize Road to 151st Street West in Wichita to accelerate urban sprawl in western Sedgwick County and Goddard. Approximately 70% of the design is complete, with $4 million allocated to finish the design phase in 2026. While construction on this segment is slated for a later start date, it is scheduled to overlap with the ongoing expansion of Kellogg Avenue on the opposite side of the metropolitan area. Total construction costs are estimated at $200 million, extending Kellogg Avenue beyond 119th Street West. City and county officials claimed increased traffic along 119th, 135th, and 167th Streets West justified the high cost of the project. Officials claimed broad support from local residents, businesses, and state representatives, including Senator Jerry Moran and Representative Ron Estes.

== Major intersections ==
All exits are unnumbered.

County	Location	mi	km	Destinations	Notes
Seward		0.000	0.000	US 54 west	Continuation into Oklahoma
Seward				Old US 54	Interchange
Seward	Liberal			US-270 east / US-83 (Country Estates Road) / 2nd Street / Bluebell Road – Garden City, Turpin OK	Western terminus of US-270
Meade				US-160 west	Western end of US-160 overlap
Meade	Meade			K-23 (Fowler Street)	
Meade	Meade			US-160 east	Eastern end of US-160 overlap
Meade				K-98 west	Eastern terminus of K-98
Clark	Minneola			US-283 (Oak Street) – Englewood, Dodge City	
Ford				K-94 south	Northern terminus of K-94
Ford	Bucklin			K-34 north	Western end of K-34 overlap
Ford	Bucklin			K-34 south (Main Street)	Eastern end of K-34 overlap
Kiowa				US-400 west – Mullinville, Dodge City	Interchange; western end of US-400 overlap; westbound exit and eastbound entrance
Kiowa				US-183 – Kinsley, Coldwater	
Pratt	Pratt			US-281 – St. John, Medicine Lodge, Airport	
Pratt	Pratt			K-61 north – Hutchinson, Pratt Community College	
Kingman				170th Avenue – Cunningham	Interchange
Kingman				K-11 north – Hutchinson	Former K-14 north
Kingman	Kingman			K-14 south (Main Street) – Anthony, Business District, Airport	Western end of K-14 overlap
Kingman				40th Avenue	Western end of freeway
Kingman				70th Avenue	
Kingman				K-14 north (100th Avenue) – Hutchinson, Murdock	Eastern end of K-14 overlap; former K-17
Kingman				Mt. Vernon	
Sedgwick				K-251 (391st Street West)	
Sedgwick				383rd Street West	
Sedgwick				343rd Street West	
Sedgwick				Garden Plain	Eastern end of freeway; former K-163
Sedgwick	Wichita			Maize Road	Western end of freeway
Sedgwick	Wichita			Tyler Road	
Sedgwick	Wichita			Ridge Road – Eisenhower National Airport	
Sedgwick	Wichita			Dugan Road	No direct eastbound exit (signed at Ridge Road)
Sedgwick	Wichita			I-235	Split into separate exits for I-235 NB and SB; I-235 exit 7
Sedgwick	Wichita			West Street	
Sedgwick	Wichita			Edwards Street / Meridian Avenue	Access to Southwest Boulevard (former K-42)
Sedgwick	Wichita			Seneca Street / Sycamore Street	
Sedgwick	Wichita			Central Business District	
Sedgwick	Wichita			Washington Avenue	
Sedgwick	Wichita			I-135 / US-81 / K-15 – Salina, Oklahoma City	I-135 exits 5B-6A
Sedgwick	Wichita			Grove Street	Westbound exit and eastbound entrance
Sedgwick	Wichita			Hillside Street	
Sedgwick	Wichita			Oliver Avenue / Edgemoor Street	
Sedgwick	Wichita			Woodlawn Boulevard	Westbound access via Towne East Drive/Armour Drive
Sedgwick	Wichita			Towne East Drive / Armour Drive	
Sedgwick	Wichita			Rock Road	Eastbound access via Towne East Drive/Armour Drive
Sedgwick	Wichita			I-35 / Kansas Turnpike – Oklahoma City, Kansas City	Closed, access via south frontage road only; I-35/Kansas Tpke. exit 50
Sedgwick	Wichita			Webb Road	Opened in 2020
Sedgwick	Wichita			Greenwich Road	Opened in 2020
Sedgwick	Wichita			I-35 / Kansas Turnpike – Oklahoma City, Kansas City	Eastbound exit and westbound entrance, no direct access from NB I-35/Kansas Tpke.; I-35/Kansas Tpke. exit 53A
Sedgwick				K-96 west to I-35 / Kansas Turnpike	Interchange; eastern end of freeway
Butler	Augusta			US-77 south (Walnut Street) – Douglass, Winfield	Western end of US-77 overlap
Butler				Haverhill, Smileyberg	Interchange
Butler				US-400 east – Fredonia	Partial interchange; eastern end of US-400 overlap; eastbound exit ramp, westbound access via SE 100th Street
Butler	El Dorado			US-77 north (N. Main Street) / K-254 west (W. Central Avenue)	Eastern end of US-77 overlap; eastern terminus of K-254
Butler				K-177 north	Southern terminus of K-177
Greenwood				K-99 south	Western end of K-99 overlap
Greenwood				K-99 north	Eastern end of K-99 overlap
Woodson				K-105 south – Toronto	
Woodson	Yates Center			US-75	
Allen				US-169 – Garnett, Chanute	Interchange
Allen	Moran			US-59	
Bourbon				K-3 north	Western end of K-3 overlap
Bourbon				K-3 south	Eastern end of K-3 overlap
Bourbon				K-7 north	Western end of K-7 overlap
Bourbon				US-69 north – Kansas City	Interchange; western end of US-69 overlap
Bourbon	Fort Scott			US-69 / K-7 south – Pittsburg	Interchange; eastern end of US-69/K-7 overlap
Bourbon				US 54 east – Nevada	Continuation into Missouri
1.000 mi = 1.609 km; 1.000 km = 0.621 mi: Closed/former; Concurrency terminus; Electronic toll collection; Incomplete access

U.S. Route 54
Previous state: Oklahoma	Kansas	Next state: Missouri
