= Kellogg Avenue =

Major road in Kansas

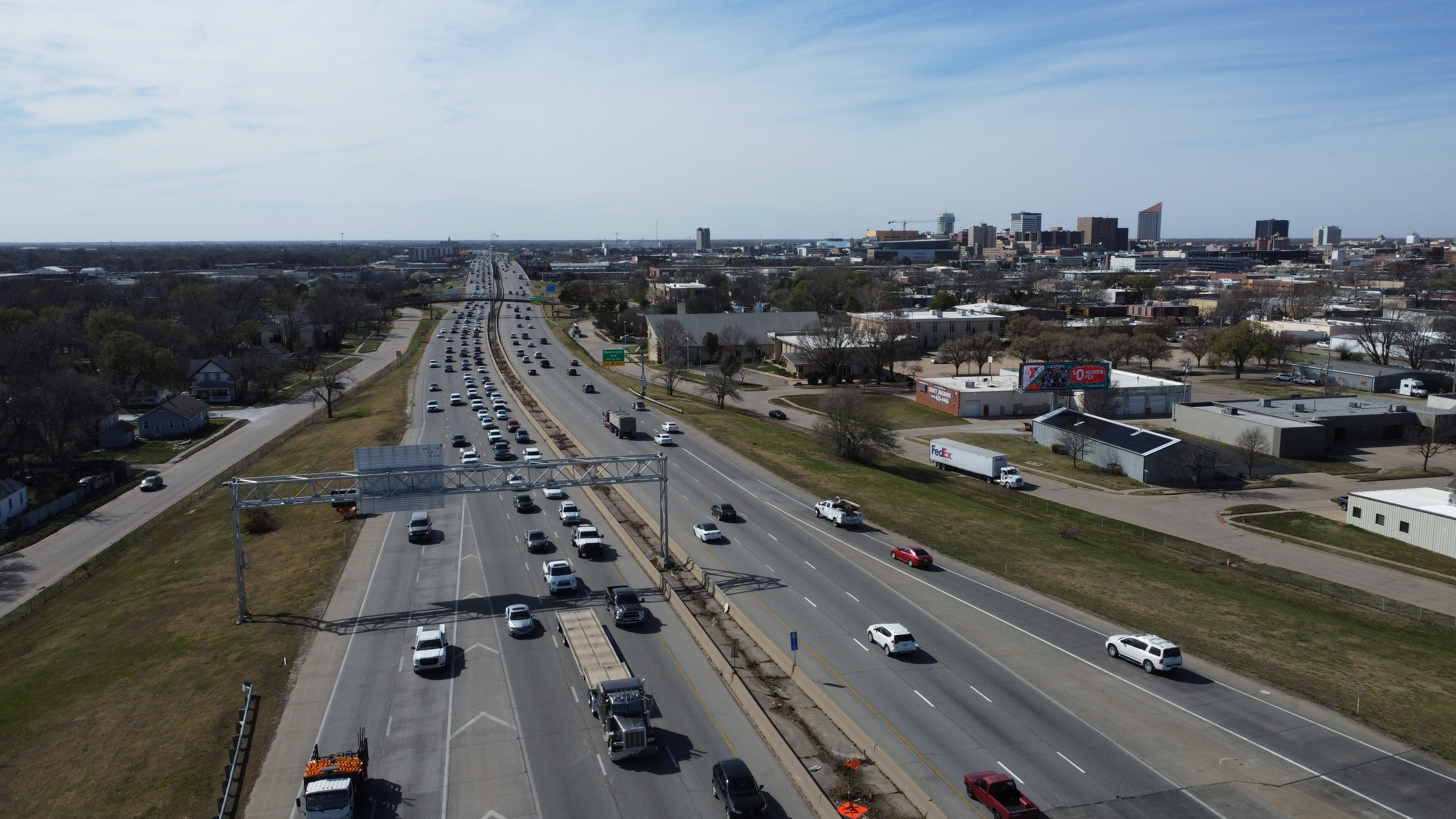
- Kellogg Avenue (US-54/US-400) looking west toward downtown Wichita
- Interactive map of Kellogg Avenue
- Length: 24.0 mi (38.6 km)
- Coordinates: 37.677°N 97.325°W
- West end: 215th Street W near Goddard
- East end: Junction of US‑54/US‑400 at 159th Street E in Andover

Kellogg Avenue, known locally as Kellogg, is a major east–west thoroughfare in Sedgwick County, Kansas, serving as the primary expressway for the city of Wichita.

Its western terminus is located at 215th Street West near Goddard, and its eastern terminus is at the junction of 159th Street East in Andover.

The roadway is signed concurrently as US Highway 54 (US‑54) and US-400 throughout its entire length across the metropolitan area, functioning as the central east–west spine of the city's highway system, with segments near downtown regularly exceeding 110,000 vehicles per day. The expressway mainly functions to connect the western and eastern suburbs of the Wichita metropolitan area to the city's core and the Wichita Dwight D. Eisenhower National Airport. It serves as an important vehicular commercial and commuter artery, passing through downtown Wichita and providing a direct link between the residential communities of Goddard and Andover.

== Route description ==
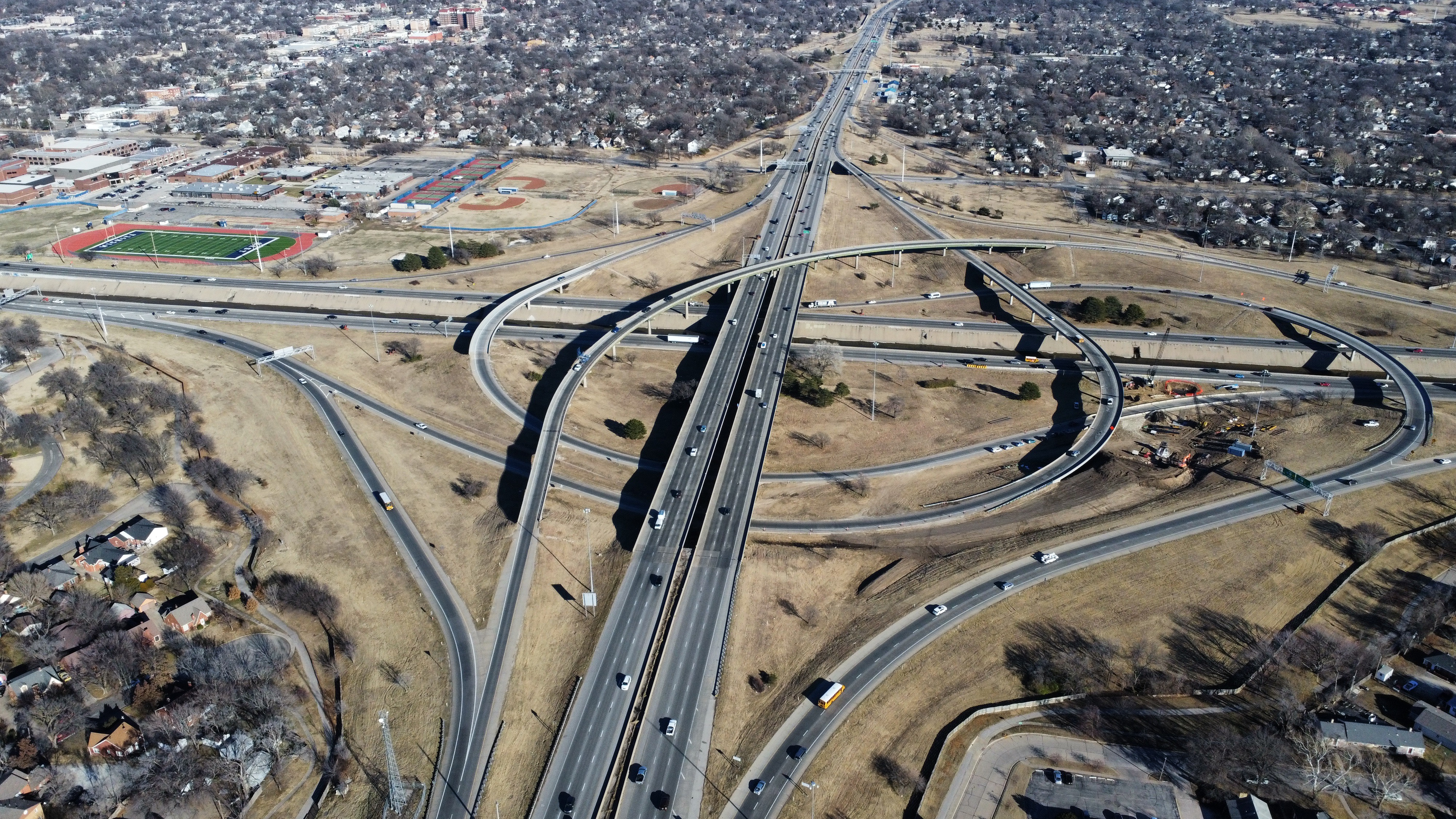
Aerial view of the I-135 and Kellogg turbine interchange looking west. In this view, Kellogg Avenue runs from the bottom to the top of the frame, passing the campus of Wichita East High School (upper left).

Kellogg Avenue designation begins on US‑54/US‑400 at 215th Street West near Goddard, Kansas, heading east into Wichita. As it approaches the Wichita city limits, the roadway transitions from an at-grade, partially controlled-access road into a high-speed, multi-lane controlled-access expressway with frontage roads at Maize Road. It features a stack interchange with Interstate 235 (I‑235) on the city's west side, and an interchange providing access to Wichita Dwight D. Eisenhower National Airport. Continuing east, the route passes through the core of Wichita, running immediately adjacent to Friends University and Newman University, before transitioning into a viaduct and providing access to Downtown Wichita, and intersecting I‑135.

East of downtown, the expressway then transitions to at-grade and depressed segments as it serves the city’s major retail and commercial corridors. East of the commercial corridors, the freeway has junctions at I‑35/Kansas Turnpike and at K‑96. Immediately east of the K‑96 junction, the freeway transitions back to an at-grade, partially controlled-access road with traffic signals. The route continues through the eastern suburbs before reaching its eastern terminus at a major junction at the Butler County line, where the US‑54/US‑400 designation continues through Andover and toward Augusta.

== History ==
Kellogg Avenue was originally a standard city street named after Milo Kellogg, a prominent early Wichita resident and American Civil War veteran. Before the expressways era, the route was designated as part of the Cannonball Stageline Highway, an early stage route from Wichita westward. As automobile traffic increased, it became the primary path for US‑54 through the city. In the mid-20th century, the route was expanded into a four-lane road, and it remained plagued by heavy congestion and frequent traffic signals as Wichita's automobile usage surged.

The first section of Kellogg Avenue built as an expressway was west of the Arkansas River. It was completed in 1949 as Brockway Boulevard over the former Wichita and Western Railroad right-of-way. The transformation of the previously existing Kellogg Avenue into a controlled-access freeway began in the 1950s and has continued for over 70 years through a series of phased projects. In the 1980s, the modernization and expansion significantly accelerated, beginning with the construction of the interchange at West Street and the downtown viaduct.

Following the decommissioning of several surface-level intersections, the roadway was gradually sunken or elevated to remove stoplights. In 1994, the US‑400 designation was added to the route, overlapping with US‑54. 21st century expansion efforts have focused on extending freeway standards further west toward Goddard and further east past Andover to accelerate suburban growth.

=== Cultural impact and construction ===
In local Wichita lore, Kellogg Avenue is well known for its nearly constant construction aimed at increasing capacity. Because of the projects' large scale and its incremental, phased expansion since the 1950s, the road has become a subject of local humor. Former mayor Brandon Whipple recalled a 2005 excavation during which a mammoth tusk was discovered, noting that paleontologists joked that road crews were "using mammoths instead of trucks". The same article also attributes another quip, reportedly from a former city manager, stating that "in five billion years the sun will burn out, which is a real shame because that means they'll have to finish Kellogg in the dark".

Kellogg Avenue east of the Arkansas River was originally built as a commercial street, with businesses and residences fronting the avenue. The former Kellogg Elementary School and Sunnyside Elementary School fronted Kellogg until highway construction prevented pedestrian access. What had once been a hub of activity, gradually was turned into a neighborhood barrier as the street was converted to an expressway.

== Future ==
In 2021, for the first time in 30 years, no segment of Kellogg Avenue was under construction beyond routine maintenance, following the completion of a significant project from Woodlawn Boulevard to K‑96. However, on March 23, 2026, construction began on the easternmost portion of Kellogg Avenue, referred to by the Kansas Department of Transportation (KDOT) as the East Kellogg Project. This segment, extending from K‑96 to 159th Street East, is being rebuilt as a grade-separated, controlled-access roadway and is anticipated to be completed in 2029. As of the start of construction, the project represents the largest let construction contract in Kansas history. The project will require a $288 million subsidy to complete.

The West Kellogg Road Project is a planned westward expansion of controlled-access Kellogg Avenue from Maize Road to 151st Street West to accelerate growth in western Sedgwick County and Goddard. Approximately 70% of the design is complete, with $4 million allocated to finish the design phase in 2026. While construction on this segment is slated for a later start date, it is scheduled to overlap with the ongoing expansion of Kellogg Avenue on the opposite side of the metropolitan area. Total construction costs are estimated at $200 million, extending Kellogg Avenue beyond 119th Street West. City and county officials claimed increased traffic along 119th, 135th, and 167th Streets West justified the high cost of the project. Officials claimed broad support from local residents, businesses, and state representatives, including Senator Jerry Moran and Representative Ron Estes.

== Major intersections ==
The entire route is in Wichita, Sedgwick County. All exits are unnumbered.

mi	km	Destinations	Notes
		151st Street West	Proposed; future western end of freeway
		135th Street West	Proposed; future exit
		119th Street West	Proposed; future exit
		Maize Road	
		Tyler Road	
		Ridge Road – Eisenhower National Airport	
		Dugan Road	No direct eastbound exit (signed at Ridge Road)
		I-235	
		West Street	
		Edwards Street, Meridian Avenue	Access to Southwest Boulevard K-42
		Seneca Street, Sycamore Street	
		Central Business District	Split diamond interchange: Main Street, Market Street, Broadway Avenue, Topeka Avenue
		Washington Avenue	
		I-135 / US-81 / K-15	
		Grove Street	Westbound exit and eastbound entrance
		Hillside Street	
		Oliver Avenue	
		Edgemoor Street	No direct westbound exit (unsigned access from Woodlawn Boulevard)
		Woodlawn Boulevard	Westbound access via Towne East Drive and Armour Drive
		Towne East Drive, Armour Drive	
		Rock Road	Eastbound access via Towne East Drive and Armour Drive
		I-35 / Kansas Turnpike	Unsigned access via south frontage road only; I-35/Kansas Tpke exit 50
		Webb Road	
		Greenwich Road	
		I-35 / Kansas Turnpike – Kansas City, Topeka, Oklahoma City	Eastbound exit and westbound entrance, no direct access from northbound I-35/Kansas Tpke; I-35/ KansasTpke exit 53A
		K-96 west	Interchange; current eastern end of freeway
		127th Street East	Proposed; future exit
		143rd Street East	Proposed; future exit
		159th Street East	Proposed; future exit; eastern terminus; US-54/US-400 continue eastward
1.000 mi = 1.609 km; 1.000 km = 0.621 mi: Electronic toll collection; Incomplete access; Unopened
