= K-254 (Kansas highway) =

State highway in Kansas, U.S.

K-254
- K-254 highlighted in red

Route information
- Maintained by KDOT and the city of El Dorado
- Length: 27.369 mi (44.046 km)
- Existed: May 9, 1956–present

Major junctions
- West end: I-235 / I-135 / US-81 / K-15 / K-96 in Wichita
- K-196 west of El Dorado; I-35 / Kansas Turnpike in El Dorado
- East end: US-77 / US-54 in El Dorado

Location
- Country: United States
- State: Kansas
- Counties: Sedgwick, Butler

Highway system
- Kansas State Highway System; Interstate; US; State; Spurs
← K-253	→ K-255

K-254 is a 27.369-mile-long (44.046 km) state highway in the U.S. state of Kansas and links Wichita to El Dorado. K-254 begins at the intersection of Interstate 135 (I-135), I-235, U.S. Route 81 (US-81), K-15 and K-96 north of Wichita. It bypasses Kechi, Benton and Towanda, ending in downtown El Dorado at an intersection with US-54 and US-77. It is limited access from I-135 to just east of Kechi. It is then four-lane divided with at grade intersections to El Dorado with the exception of a diamond interchange at K-196. There is a stoplight interchange with I-35/Kansas Turnpike on the west side of El Dorado.

== Route description ==
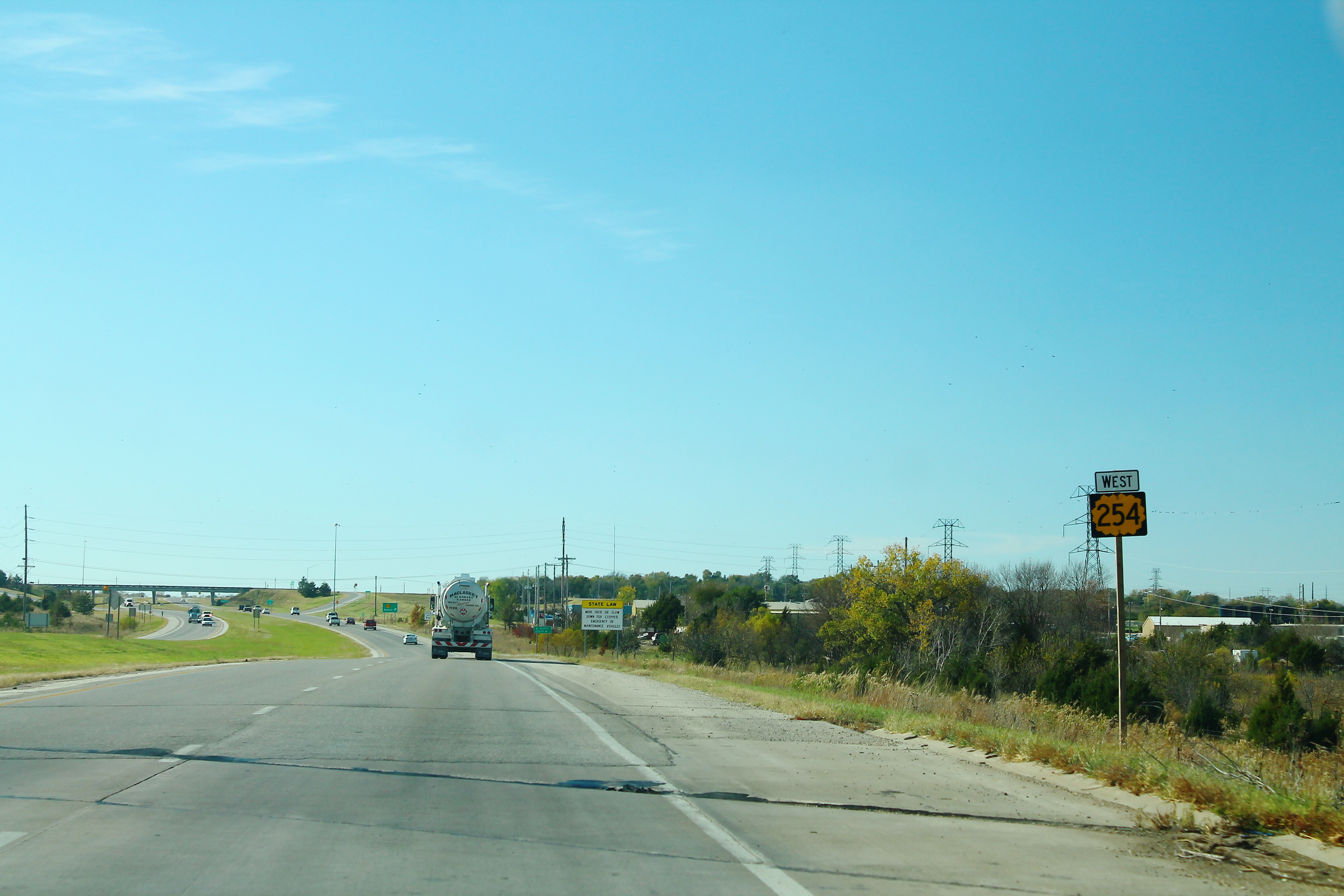
K-254 westbound

K-254 begins at an interchange with I-135, I-235, US-81, K-15 and K-96 in Wichita and begins travelling east. It soon crosses Middle Fork Chisholm Creek then reaches an interchange with 45th Street North and Hillside Street. At this point the freeway curves northeast and begins to parallel a railroad track. It then passes under 53rd Street as it enters Kechi. K-254 then crosses Middle Fork Chisholm Creek again then curves more eastward and reaches an interchange with Oliver Avenue. The highway then curves east and reaches an interchange with Woodlawn Street and 61st Street North. It then has an at grade intersection with Rock Road as it exits Kechi. The highway continues for 2.4 miles (3.9 km) then crosses Whitewater Creek. It continues for 3.6 miles (5.8 km) then enters into Butler County. About two miles (3.2 km) into the county it passes along the north side and briefly enters the city of Benton. In the city it intersects Main Street, which connects the highway to the main part of the city. As it exits the city it passes Benton Cemetery and begins to parallel a Union Pacific Railway track. K-254 continues east, passing through flat lands with a few houses, then curves northeast as it crosses West Branch Whitewater River. The highway quickly curves back east again as it passes along the north side of the city of Towanda. It then crosses a Union Pacific Railway track then curves northeast and begins to parallel it. The highway continues for about 2.8 miles (4.5 km) through flat rural farmlands and reaches a diamond interchange with K-196 then crosses over I-35 and the Kansas Turnpike. It continues east for a short distance before intersecting a connector road that leads to I-35 and the Kansas Turnpike as it enters the city of El Dorado. K-254 continues through the city as Central Avenue and then reduces to an undivided highway slightly east of its intersection with Haverhill Road. The highway then crosses Constant Creek as it continues east before reaching its eastern terminus at US-54 and US-77.

The Kansas Department of Transportation (KDOT) tracks the traffic levels on its highways, and in 2018, they determined that on average the traffic varied from 11600 vehicles per day slightly east of Kechi to 18700 vehicles per day near the western terminus. The second highest was 15800 vehicles per day at the end of the freeway section in El Dorado. The entire length of K-254 is included in the National Highway System. The National Highway System is a system of highways important to the nation's defense, economy, and mobility. The first 11.882 miles (19.122 km) of the route is paved with full design bituminous pavement, the next 2.429 miles (3.909 km) is paved with composite pavement, and the remaining to the eastern terminus is full design bituminous pavement. All but 3.437 miles (6 km) of K-254's alignment is maintained by KDOT. The entire section of K-254 within El Dorado is maintained by the city.

== History ==
K-254 was first authorized to become a state highway in a May 9, 1956 resolution once Butler and Sedgwick counties had brought the route up to state highway standards. Then by June 1957, Butler county had finished projects and in a June 26, 1957 resolution it was established as a state highway from the Sedgwick–Butler County line to K-196. Then sometime between June 26, 1957 and 1964 it was extended along K-196 through El Dorado to its current eastern terminus. In an August 12, 1959 resolution the section in Sedgwick County was established as a state highway because Sedgwick County had finished bringing it up to state highway standards. By April 1963, K-254 had become part of the federal aid primary system and due to this a section between Kechi and Wichita was realigned and made a four-lane highway. Then in an August 26, 1970 resolution, K-96 was rerouted along the first 1.183 miles (1.904 km) from the western terminus. This overlap lasted roughly 18 years, then in a June 14, 1988 resolution K-96 was rerouted along I-135 and the overlap was removed. The overlap with K-196 was removed on May 6, 1994 and K-196 was truncated to end at K-254 west of El Dorado. In a February 8, 1996 resolution it was approved to realign the highway to the north of Towanda and to realign the highway slightly north near Benton.

== Future ==
The state is studying a northwestern bypass of Wichita, which would be US-54. If that happens KDOT would designate K-254 as US-54.

The bypass would run for 12 miles from K-96 at Tyler Road to US 400/US 54/Kellogg Avenue near 183rd Street. The project would consume 1,334 acres of prime farmland. KDOT began purchasing right-of-way in 2006 and by 2023, one third of the right-of-way had been acquired. By 2025, this had risen to 40%. Sedgwick County had provided a $1 million per year subsidy to purchase right-of way, with Maize and Goddard each spending $5,000 annually on the right-of-way. By the end of 2025, local governments had spent $14 million with KDOT spending an additional $14 million on right-of-way.

By this time, project costs had more than doubled to over $1 billion with an estimated economic impact of only $900 million. For this reason among others, the project has lost the support of KDOT and has only received support from west Sedgwick County suburban communities. At the end of 2025, KDOT began to put together a new feasibility study for the corridor to evaluate future options.

== Major junctions ==
All exits are unnumbered.

County	Location	mi	km	Destinations	Notes
Sedgwick	Wichita	0.000	0.000	I-235 south / I-135 / US-81 / K-15 / K-96	Western terminus; I-135 exit 11A; freeway continues as I-235
Sedgwick	Wichita	1.183	1.904	45th Street North / Hillside Street	
Sedgwick	Kechi	3.008	4.841	Oliver Avenue	Eastbound exit and westbound entrance
Sedgwick	Kechi	4.339	6.983	Woodlawn Street / 61st Street North	
Sedgwick	Kechi	5.339	8.592	Rock Road	At-grade intersection; east end of freeway section
Butler		23.476	37.781	K-196 west – Newton	Eastern terminus of K-196; diamond interchange
Butler	El Dorado	24.628	39.635	I-35 / Kansas Turnpike	I-35/Kansas Tpke. exit 71
Butler	El Dorado	27.369	44.046	US-77 (Main Street) / US-54	Eastern terminus; highway continues as US 54 east (E. Central Avenue)
1.000 mi = 1.609 km; 1.000 km = 0.621 mi: Incomplete access; Tolled; Route transition
