= K-34 (Kansas highway) =

State highway in Kansas, U.S.

K-34
- K-34 highlighted in red

Route information
- Maintained by KDOT
- Length: 29.260 mi (47.089 km)
- Existed: July 1, 1937–present

Major junctions
- South end: US-160 / US-183 east of Ashland
- US-54 in Bucklin
- North end: US-400 north of Bucklin

Location
- Country: United States
- State: Kansas
- Counties: Clark, Ford

Highway system
- Kansas State Highway System; Interstate; US; State; Spurs
← K-33	→ I-35
← K-41	→ K-42
← K-296	→ I-335

K-34 is a 29.26-mile-long (47.09 km) state highway in southwestern Kansas that runs from U.S. Route 160 (US-160) and US-183 near Ashland to US-400 near Bucklin. It is one of the lesser-traveled highways in the state and is not part of the National Highway System. It is a two-lane road for its entire length.

K-34 was originally designated in southeastern Kansas, running through Neodesha. The designation was moved to southwestern Kansas in 1937, replacing the old K-41 designation. The highway formerly ran to the Oklahoma border via a concurrency with US-183. The designation was shortened in 1993 to its current routing.

== Route description ==
K-34 begins at an intersection with US-160 and US-183 east of Ashland in Clark County. It heads north through rolling farmland along a two-lane road. A series of curves takes the highway northeast, after which the route straightens out to the north and crosses Bluff Creek before intersecting a road which, prior to 1965, carried K-34. It continues due north and enters Ford County. North of the county line and south of Bucklin, K-34 takes the name 132 Road. The route turns to the northwest as it crosses Day Road and enters the city of Bucklin.

After entering the city, K-34 curves to the north and becomes Main Street. In the northern portion of Bucklin, the route turns southwest and overlaps U.S. Route 54 for a short distance. Following the short concurrency, K-34 turns to the north and passes under a railroad operated by Union Pacific. The highway twists to the northwest and leaves Bucklin, meeting its northern terminus a few miles farther to the northwest at an intersection with US-400.

K-34 is maintained by the Kansas Department of Transportation (KDOT). The route's annual average daily traffic in 2012 was about 570 vehicles, including 240 trucks, south of Bucklin. North of the city, there was significantly more traffic. There were 1010 vehicles, and 285 trucks, from Bucklin to the highway's northern terminus. No segment of the highway is part of the National Highway System, a system of highways important to the nation's defense, economy, and mobility.

== History ==
=== Previous designation ===
In 1926, K-34 was designated to a highway between Waverly and Garnett, then by 1927, was renumbered as K-31. In 1927, K-34 was reassigned to a highway from K-96 west of Neodesha east to K-16 north of Cherryvale. By 1934 a separate segment of the route was designated in Cherokee County, from Crestline to the Missouri state line. By 1937, the segment of K-34 from K-96 east to K-16 was re-designated as K-37, and the segment of the route from Crestline to the Missouri border was re-designated as K-26.

=== Current designation ===
K-41
- Location: Protection–near Bucklin
- Existed: 1927–c. 1937

The current K-34 was designated on July 1, 1937, to a highway running from the Oklahoma border north through Sitka to US-160. Soon after it was extended west along US-160 to Protection and turned north to follow K-41 north then turn east to Lexington. In Lexington it turned north and continued to US-154 north of Bucklin. This resulted in K-41 being decommissioned. At the time of its designation, not all of K-34 was paved. The segment in Ford County and the concurrency with US-160 was paved, but all other segments were either gravel or dirt. Between 1938 and 1939, US-183 was extended into Kansas, and overlapped K-34 from the Oklahoma border to Protection. In an October 24, 1950 resolution, the highway was realigned to travel east from Lexington for 2.15 miles (3.46 km) then north for 7.7 miles (12.4 km) to meet the old alignment.

K-334
- Location: North of Sitka
- Length: 8.1 mi (13.0 km)
- Existed: February 27, 1963–c. 1965

On February 27, 1963, a highway was added from K-34 and US-160 north to K-34. The new highway was going to be a reroute for K-34, once the state had finished improving the old K-34 so it could be turned over to the county. On March 8, 1963, the State Highway Commission designated the new highway as K-334. By 1965, K-334 was decommissioned and became K-34, which was realigned to continue north from the intersection with US-160 and US-183 instead of overlapping those highways and traveling east. This realignment caused the route to bypass Comanche County entirely. The entire length of K-34 was paved by 1967. By 1993, K-34 was truncated to its current southern terminus. The route has not been modified since 1993.

== Major intersections ==
County	Location	mi	km	Destinations	Notes
Clark	Sitka Township	0.000	0.000	US-160 / US-183 – Sitka, Protection, Ashland	Southern terminus; road continues as US-183 south (former K-34 south)
Ford	Bucklin	25.528	41.083	US-54 east – Greensburg	East end of US-54 concurrency
Ford	Bucklin	25.649	41.278	US-54 west – Dodge City, Meade	West end of US-54 concurrency
Ford	Ford Township	29.260	47.089	US-400 – Dodge City, Ford, Greensburg	Northern terminus; former US-154
1.000 mi = 1.609 km; 1.000 km = 0.621 mi: Concurrency terminus
