= U.S. Route 400 =

Highway in the Midwestern United States

U.S. Route 400
- US 400 highlighted in red

Route information
- Maintained by CDOT, KDOT, MoDOT, and the city of Cimarron
- Length: 481.306 mi (Note: Total mileage is a summation of the state mileages.) (774.587 km)
- Existed: 1994–present
- History: Extended west in 1996

Major junctions
- West end: US 50 / US 385 in Granada, CO
- US-83 / K-156 in Garden City, KS; US-50 / US-56 / US-283 in Dodge City, KS; I-235 in Wichita, KS; I-135 / US-81 / K-15 in Wichita, KS; I-35 / Kansas Turnpike at Wichita, KS; US-54 / US-77 by Augusta, KS; US-75 east of Fredonia, KS; US-69 at Pittsburg, KS; US 69 Alt. at Crestline, KS; US-166 east of Baxter Springs, KS
- East end: I-44 / US 166 in Joplin, MO

Location
- Country: United States
- States: Colorado, Kansas, Missouri

Highway system
- United States Numbered Highway System; List; Special; Divided
- Colorado State Highway System; Interstate; US; State; Scenic
- Kansas State Highway System; Interstate; US; State; Spurs
- Missouri State Highway System; Interstate; US; State; Supplemental
| ← US 163 | US | → US 412 |
| ← SH 394 | CO | → SH 402 |
| ← K-383 | KS | → I-435 |
| ← Route 376 | MO | → US 412 |

U.S. Route 400 (US 400) is a 481.306-mile-long (774.587 km) mostly east–west U.S. Highway, commissioned in 1994. The highway's western terminus is in Granada, Colorado, at an intersection with US 385. The highway's eastern terminus is southwest of Joplin, Missouri, near Loma Linda, at an interchange with Interstate 44, with which it shares with US 166. It originally ended in Garden City, Kansas; in 1996 it was extended to its current western terminus.

== Route description ==
The route number does not follow the numbering convention for U.S. Highways established by the American Association of State Highway and Transportation Officials. The number 400 implies the route is a spur of U.S. Route 0, which does not exist.

=== Colorado ===
US 400 begins in Granada at an intersection with US 385. It then runs concurrently with US 50 through Holly east to the Kansas border.

=== Kansas ===
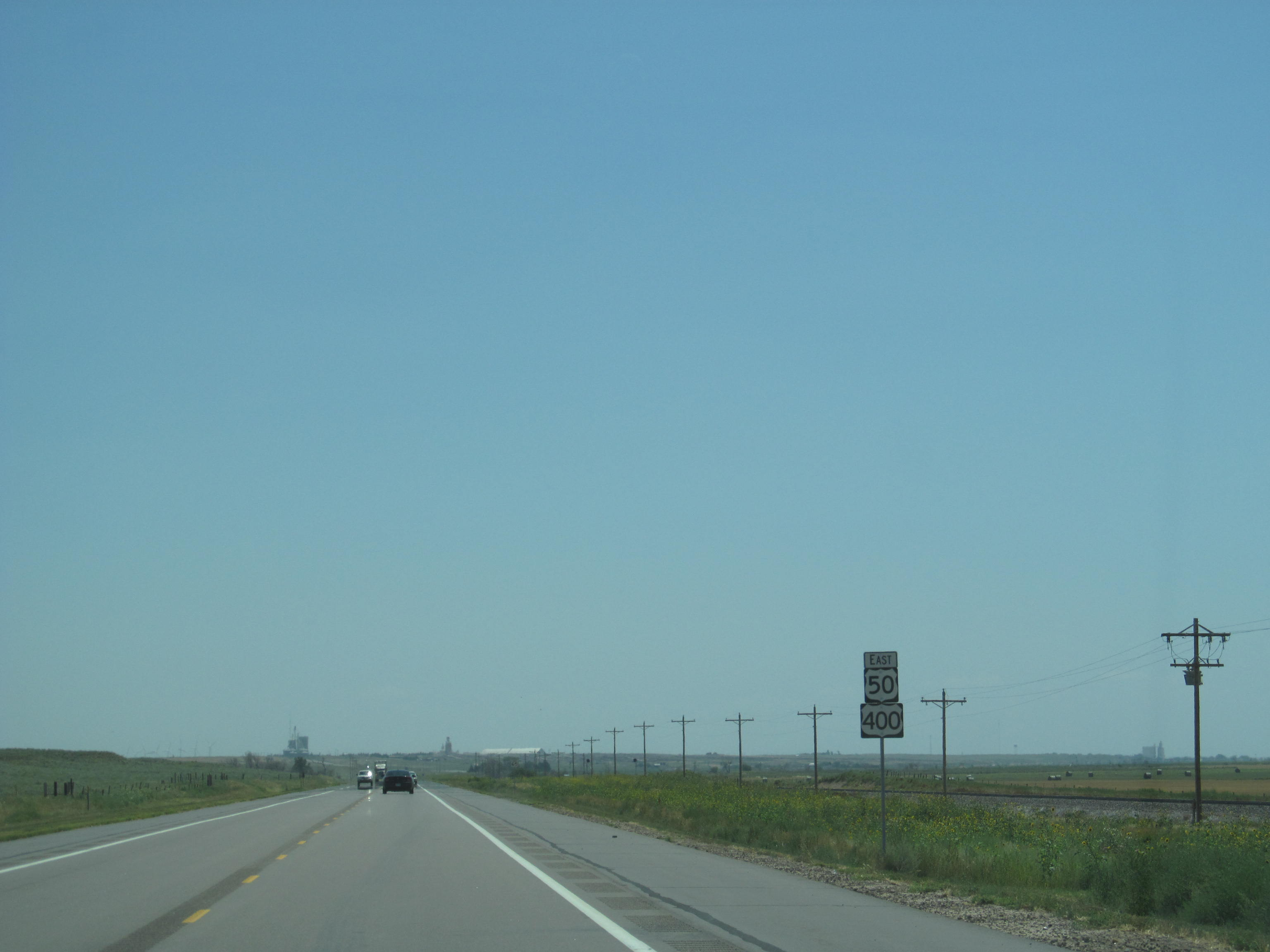
US 50 and US 400 eastbound

US 400 and US 50 enter Kansas west of Coolidge. They run concurrently through Garden City, where it intersects US 83 and separate at Dodge City, which is where it intersects US 56 and US 283. It continues southeast from Dodge City and first intersects US 54 at Mullinville.

US 400 and US 54 begin a long concurrency at Mullinville which passes through Greensburg, Pratt and Kingman before entering Wichita. While in Wichita, US 400 and US 54 intersect Interstate 235 and the concurrency of US 81 and Interstate 135. K-96 provides a short freeway connection to Interstate 35, which is also the Kansas Turnpike. At Augusta, US 400 and US 54 enter into another concurrency with US 77, and US 400 breaks from this concurrency at Haverhill.

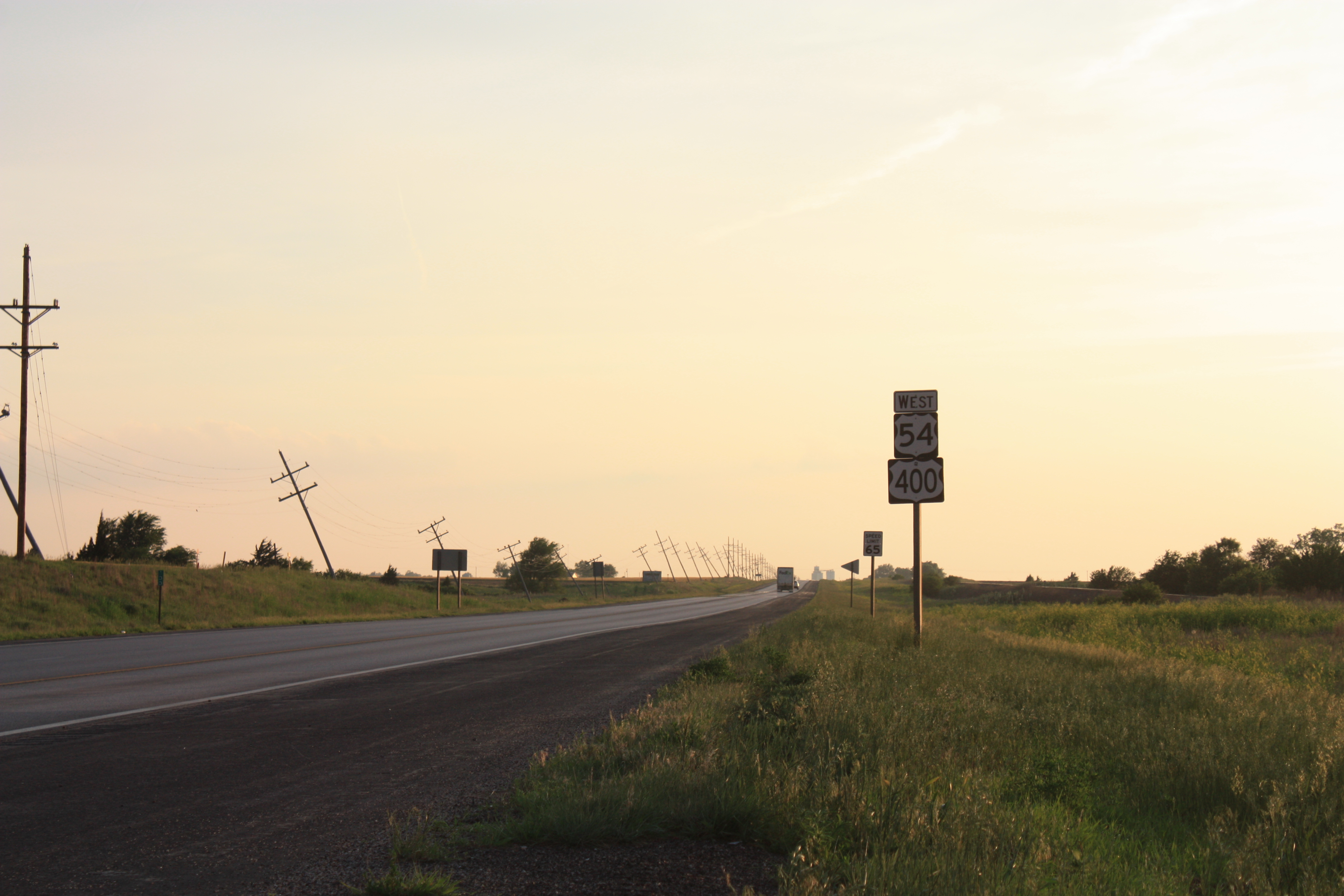
US 400/54 a few miles west of Pratt, Kansas.

US 400 continues east through several small towns before turning southeast to go through the Fredonia area and intersecting US 75 at Neodesha. After a brief concurrency with US 75, it turns east, first intersecting U.S. Route 169 near Morehead and then US 59 near Parsons before finally intersecting US 69 south of Pittsburg. It then turns south with US 69 and at Crestline, follows US 69A south to Riverton. US 400 then turns east with US 166 at Baxter Springs and the two highways run concurrently eastward into Missouri.

The entire 1.369-mile (2 km) section of US 400 in Cimarron is maintained by the city.

=== Missouri ===
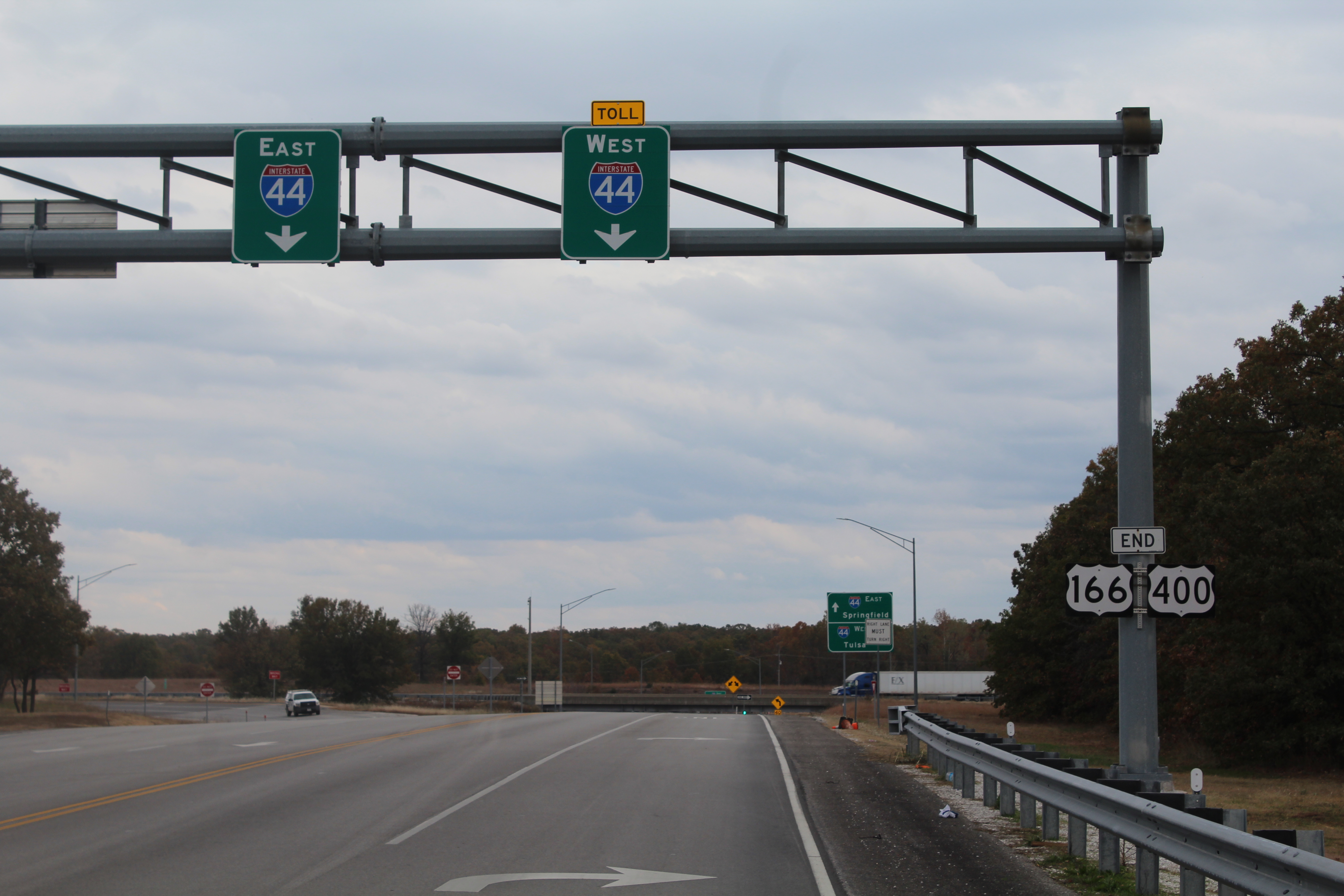
U.S. 400's eastern terminus approaching I-44 in Newton County, Missouri

US 400, along with US 166, terminates at I-44 about one mile (1.6 km) east of the Kansas-Missouri state line, three miles (5 km) west of Joplin.

== History ==
US 400 was first established on December 1, 1994, and at that time ran from the east end of the US-50 and US-83 overlap, eastward to the east county line of Cherokee County, Kansas.

In a May 3, 1995 resolution, it was approved to move US-400 and K-96 to a new alignment between northwest of Fredonia and Neodesha, at that time the overlap with K-47 was removed. In a December 3, 1998 resolution, it was approved to truncate K-96 to end at US-400 by Wichita.

In the 2020s, the entire US-400 corridor was designated as an Alternative Fuel Corridor for electric vehicles.

=== U.S. Route 154 ===
U.S. Highway 154
- Location: Dodge City, KS–Mullinville, KS
- Existed: 1926–1982

A section of U.S. 400 that ran from Dodge City to Mullinville in Kansas was U.S. Route 154 from 1926 to 1982. It later became K-154 before becoming part of U.S. 400.

Construction on the first section of the East Kellogg improvement project started in August 2015. The project included a redesigned intersection with Webb Road and widened US-54 and US-400 from four lanes to six lanes from Webb Road to Greenwich Road. Construction on a second project began in 2016, to continue widening the highway to a six-lane freeway between Greenwich Road and K-96. Also new bridges will be built over I-35/KTA, new ramps will be constructed from southbound I-35/KTA to westbound US-54/US-400 and from eastbound US-54/US-400 to both northbound and southbound I-35/KTA. In addition, two-lane one way frontage roads on each side of the freeway will be built. Construction for both projects were completed around September of 2021. A two-mile section of the new highway, from Eastern Street to the K-96 junction, opened on November 21, 2019. On April 16, 2020, vandals damaged an estimated $50,000 worth of construction equipment, which included a bulldozer, excavator and an off-road vehicle.

== Major intersections ==
All exits are unnumbered.

| State | County | Location | mi (Note: Mileposts reset at state line crossings.) | km | Destinations | Notes |
|---|---|---|---|---|---|---|
| Colorado | Prowers | Granada | 0.000 | 0.000 | US 50 west / US 385 – Lamar, Cheyenne Wells, Sand Creek Massacre National Historic Site | Western terminus; western end of US 50 overlap; highway continues as US 50 west (Goff Avenue west) |
| Colorado | Prowers | Holly | 10.737 | 17.280 | SH 89 (First Avenue) – Lycan | |
| | | | 14.814 0.000 | 23.841 0.000 | Colorado–Kansas line | |
| Kansas | Hamilton | Syracuse | 16.094 | 25.901 | K-27 north (McDow Street) – Tribune | Western end of concurrency with K-27 |
| Kansas | Hamilton | Syracuse | 16.624 | 26.754 | K-27 south (Main Street) – Johnson City | Eastern end of concurrency with K-27 |
| Kansas | Kearny | Lakin | 43.965 | 70.755 | K-25 (Main Street) – Ulysses, Leoti | |
| Kansas | Finney | Holcomb | 59.848 | 96.316 | Big Lowe Road – Holcomb | Diamond interchange |
| Kansas | Finney | Garden City | 65.848 | 105.972 | US-83 north / US 50 Bus. east / US 83 Bus. south – Garden City, Scott City | Diamond interchange; western end of concurrency with US-83 |
| Kansas | Finney | Garden City | 69.618 | 112.039 | K-156 (Kansas Avenue) / Mary Street | Pair of half-diamond interchanges with one-way ramps connecting Mary Street and K-156 |
| Kansas | Finney | Garden City | 71.156 | 114.514 | US-83 south / US 50 Bus. west (Fulton Street) – Garden City, Liberal | Partial cloverleaf interchange; eastern end of concurrency with US-83 |
| Kansas | Gray | Cimarron | 102.427 | 164.840 | K-23 (Main Street) – Meade, Dighton | |
| Kansas | Ford | | 116.681 | 187.780 | US-50 east – Dodge City | Eastern end of US-50 overlap |
| Kansas | Ford | | 119.852 | 192.883 | US-56 west – Sublette | Western end of US-56 overlap |
| Kansas | Ford | | 123.395 | 198.585 | US-283 south – Minneola, Boot Hill, Front Street | Western end of US-283 overlap; roundabout |
| Kansas | Ford | Dodge City | 126.825 | 204.105 | US-56 east / US-283 north – Jetmore, Kinsley | Eastern end of US-56/US-283 overlap |
| Kansas | Ford | | 147.625 | 237.579 | K-34 south – Bucklin | |
| Kansas | Kiowa | | 160.797 | 258.778 | US-54 west – Meade | Interchange; western end of US-54 overlap; westbound exit and eastbound entrance |
| Kansas | Kiowa | | 167.767 | 269.995 | US-183 – Kinsley, Coldwater | |
| Kansas | Pratt | Pratt | 199.963 | 321.809 | US-281 – St. John, Medicine Lodge, Airport | |
| Kansas | Pratt | Pratt | 201.236 | 323.858 | K-61 north – Hutchinson, Pratt Community College | |
| Kansas | Kingman | | 217.105 | 349.397 | 170th Avenue – Cunningham | Interchange |
| Kansas | Kingman | | 230.329 | 370.679 | K-11 north – Hutchinson | Former K-14 north |
| Kansas | Kingman | Kingman | 234.554 | 377.478 | K-14 south (Main Street) – Anthony, Business District, Airport | Western end of K-14 overlap |
| Kansas | Kingman | | 238.301 | 383.508 | 40th Avenue | Western end of freeway |
| Kansas | Kingman | | 239.009 | 384.648 | 70th Avenue | |
| Kansas | Kingman | | 244.713 | 393.827 | K-14 north (100th Avenue) – Hutchinson, Murdock | Eastern end of K-14 overlap; former K-17 |
| Kansas | Kingman | | 249.778 | 401.979 | Mt. Vernon | |
| Kansas | Sedgwick | | 252.769 | 406.792 | K-251 (391st Street West) | |
| Kansas | Sedgwick | | 253.769 | 408.402 | 383rd Street West | |
| Kansas | Sedgwick | | 255.819 | 411.701 | 343rd Street West | |
| Kansas | Sedgwick | | 258.820 | 416.530 | Garden Plain | Eastern end of freeway; former K-163 |
| Kansas | Sedgwick | Wichita | 267.840 | 431.047 | 151st Street West | Proposed; Future Western End Of Freeway |
| Kansas | Sedgwick | Wichita | 268.840 | 432.656 | 135th Street West | Proposed; future Exit |
| Kansas | Sedgwick | Wichita | 269.840 | 434.265 | 119th Street west | Proposed; future Exit |
| Kansas | Sedgwick | Wichita | 270.840 | 435.875 | Maize Road | |
| Kansas | Sedgwick | Wichita | 271.840 | 437.484 | Tyler Road | |
| Kansas | Sedgwick | Wichita | 272.829 | 439.076 | Ridge Road – Eisenhower National Airport | |
| Kansas | Sedgwick | Wichita | 273.838 | 440.700 | Dugan Road | No direct eastbound exit (signed at Ridge Road) |
| Kansas | Sedgwick | Wichita | 274.303 | 441.448 | I-235 | I-235 exit 7 |
| Kansas | Sedgwick | Wichita | 274.840 | 442.312 | West Street | |
| Kansas | Sedgwick | Wichita | | | Edwards Street / Meridian Avenue | Access to Southwest Boulevard (former K-42) |
| Kansas | Sedgwick | Wichita | | | Seneca Street / Sycamore Street | |
| Kansas | Sedgwick | Wichita | 253.789 | 408.434 | Central Business District | |
| Kansas | Sedgwick | Wichita | 278.459 | 448.136 | Washington Avenue | |
| Kansas | Sedgwick | Wichita | 279.205 | 449.337 | I-135 / US-81 / K-15 – Salina, Oklahoma City | I-135 exits 5B-6A |
| Kansas | Sedgwick | Wichita | | | Grove Street | Westbound exit and eastbound entrance |
| Kansas | Sedgwick | Wichita | | | Hillside Street | |
| Kansas | Sedgwick | Wichita | | | Oliver Avenue / Edgemoor Street | |
| Kansas | Sedgwick | Wichita | | | Woodlawn Boulevard | Westbound access via Towne East Drive/Armour Drive |
| Kansas | Sedgwick | Wichita | | | Towne East Drive / Armour Drive | |
| Kansas | Sedgwick | Wichita | 285.943 | 460.181 | Rock Road | Eastbound access via Towne East Drive/Armour Drive |
| Kansas | Sedgwick | Wichita | | | I-35 / Kansas Turnpike – Oklahoma City, Kansas City | Closed, access via south frontage road only; I-35/Kansas Tpke. exit 50 |
| Kansas | Sedgwick | Wichita | 286.017 | 460.300 | Webb Road | Opened in 2020 |
| Kansas | Sedgwick | Wichita | 286.072 | 460.388 | Greenwich Road | Opened in 2020 |
| Kansas | Sedgwick | Wichita | 287.122 | 462.078 | I-35 / Kansas Turnpike – Oklahoma City, Kansas City | Eastbound exit and westbound entrance, no direct access from NB I-35/Kansas Tpke.; I-35/Kansas Tpke. exit 53A |
| Kansas | Sedgwick | Wichita | 287.172 | 462.159 | K-96 west to I-35 / Kansas Turnpike – Hutchinson | Interchange; current eastern end of freeway |
| Kansas | Sedgwick | Wichita | 287.172 | 462.159 | 127th Street East | Under Construction |
| Kansas | Sedgwick | Wichita | 287.222 | 462.239 | 143rd Street East | Under Construction |
| Kansas | Sedgwick | Wichita | 287.272 | 462.319 | 159th Street East | Under Construction |
| Kansas | Butler | Andover | 287.772 | 463.124 | Onewood Drive | Proposed; future exit |
| Kansas | Butler | Andover | 288.272 | 463.929 | Andover Road | Proposed; future exit |
| Kansas | Butler | Andover | 288.772 | 464.733 | YorkTown Road | Proposed; future exit |
| Kansas | Butler | Andover | 292.272 | 470.366 | Prairie Creek Road | Proposed; future eastern end of freeway |
| Kansas | Butler | Augusta | 297.431 | 478.669 | US-77 south (Walnut Street) – Douglass, Winfield | Western end of US-77 overlap |
| Kansas | Butler | | 302.952 | 487.554 | Haverhill, Smileyberg | Interchange |
| Kansas | Butler | | 305.143 | 491.080 | US-54 east / US-77 north – El Dorado | Partial interchange; westbound access via connector road; eastern end of US-54/US-77 overlap |
| Kansas | Greenwood | | 338.268 | 544.390 | K-99 south – Howard | Western end of K-99 overlap |
| Kansas | Greenwood | | 339.315 | 546.075 | K-99 north – Emporia | Eastern end of K-99 overlap |
| Kansas | Wilson | | 358.104 | 576.313 | K-39 east – Chanute, Toronto Lake, Cross Timbers State Park | |
| Kansas | Wilson | Fredonia | 366.496 | 589.818 | K-47 – Altoona, Fredonia | Roundabout |
| Kansas | Wilson | | 377.295 | 607.197 | US-75 north – Neodesha | Interchange; western end of US-75 overlap |
| Kansas | Montgomery | | 381.326 | 613.685 | US-75 south – Independence | Interchange; eastern end of US-75 overlap |
| Kansas | Montgomery | | 390.527 | 628.492 | US-169 – Chanute, Coffeyville | Interchange |
| Kansas | Labette | Parsons | 406.061 | 653.492 | US-59 – Parsons, Erie | Interchange |
| Kansas | Cherokee–Crawford county line | | 420.172 | 676.201 | K-126 east – McCune | |
| Kansas | Cherokee–Crawford county line | Cherokee | 430.148 | 692.256 | K-7 – Girard, Columbus | |
| Kansas | Cherokee–Crawford county line | | 437.128 | 703.489 | US-69 north / US-160 east / K-171 east – Joplin, Pittsburg | Northern end of US-69/US-160 overlap; western terminus of K-171 |
| Kansas | Cherokee | | 439.095 | 706.655 | K-103 west – Weir | |
| Kansas | Cherokee | Crestline | 448.223 | 721.345 | US 69 Alt. begins / US-69 south / US-160 west – Columbus | Southern end of US-69/US-160 overlap; western end of US-69 Alt. overlap; former K-96 |
| Kansas | Cherokee | Riverton | 455.507 | 733.067 | K-66 east / Beasley Road – Galena | Roundabout |
| Kansas | Cherokee | | 457.274 | 735.911 | US 69 Alt. south – Baxter Springs | Eastern end of US-69 Alt. overlap |
| Kansas | Cherokee | | 460.350 | 740.862 | US-166 west – Baxter Springs | Western end of US-166 overlap |
| Kansas | Cherokee | | 462.251 | 743.921 | K-26 north – Galena | |
| | | | 465.556 0.000 | 749.240 0.000 | Kansas–Missouri line | |
| Missouri | Newton | | 0.936 | 1.506 | US 166 ends / I-44 – Springfield, Tulsa | Eastern termini of US 400 and US 166; I-44 exit 1; eastern end of US 166 overlap; eastbound access to S. Outer Road |
1.000 mi = 1.609 km; 1.000 km = 0.621 mi: Closed/former; Concurrency terminus; Electronic toll collection; Incomplete access; Unopened

== See also ==
- U.S. Route 412
- U.S. Route 425
