= Interstate 235 (Kansas) =

Highway in Kansas

Interstate 235
- I-235 highlighted in red

Route information
- Auxiliary route of I-135
- Maintained by KDOT
- Length: 16.52 mi (26.59 km)
- Existed: 1965 (completed)–present
- NHS: Entire route

Major junctions
- South end: I-135 / US-81 in Wichita
- K-42 in Wichita; US-54 / US-400 in Wichita; K-96 in Wichita
- North end: I-135 / US-81 / K-15 / K-96 / K-254 in Wichita

Location
- Country: United States
- State: Kansas
- Counties: Sedgwick

Highway system
- Interstate Highway System; Main; Auxiliary; Suffixed; Business; Future; Kansas State Highway System; Interstate; US; State; Spurs
← K-234	→ K-236

Interstate 235 (I-235) in Kansas is a 16.52-mile-long (26.59 km) north–south bypass spur route of I-35 that travels through the western part of Wichita. Its northern terminus is at an interchange with I-135/U.S. Highway 81 (US-81)/K-15/K-96/K-254 north of the city, where the freeway continues east as K-254. The southern is at I-135/US-81 shortly before US-81 separates from I-135 and I-135 connects to I-35 (here known as the Kansas Turnpike) at I-135's own southern terminus.

== History ==
Aside from the Kansas Turnpike, I-235 is the first component of the Interstate Highway System to be built in Wichita. The vast majority of its length, running from its original southern terminus at the Kansas Turnpike to the Broadway Avenue interchange in north Wichita, was built in 1960–1961 and was open to traffic by 1962. The remaining unbuilt length, connecting Broadway Avenue to the northern terminus, was open to traffic by July 1965. The short length of I-235 between the Turnpike interchange and the present I-135/I-235 split later became part of I-135.

== Exit list ==
The entire route is in Wichita, Sedgwick County.

mi	km	Exit	Destinations	Notes
0.000	0.000		I-135 south / US-81 south to I-35 / Kansas Turnpike	Southern terminus; I-135 exit 1C
0.000	0.000	1A	I-135 north / US-81 north – Salina	Southbound exit and northbound entrance
0.979	1.576	1B	MacArthur Road	
1.873	3.014	2	Seneca Street	
2.872	4.622	3	Meridian Avenue	
3.926	6.318	4	West Street	
5.140	8.272	5	K-42 (Southwest Boulevard)	Eastern terminus of K-42; former K-2
6.989	11.248	7	US-54 / US-400 (Kellogg Avenue)	
8.572	13.795	8	Central Avenue	
9.325	15.007	9	13th Street North west	Northbound exit and southbound entrance
10.078	16.219	10	Zoo Boulevard	
11.697	18.824	11	25th Street North	
14.118	22.721	13	K-96 west – Hutchinson, Valley Center	South end of K-96 overlap
15.576	25.067	15	Broadway Street	Former alignment of US-81
16.516	26.580	16A	I-135 south / US-81 south / K-15 south / K-96 east	North end of K-96 overlap; northbound exit and southbound entrance; I-135 exit 11A
16.516	26.580	16B	I-135 north / US-81 north / K-15 north – Salina	Northern terminus; left exit; I-135 exit 11A
16.516	26.580		K-254 east – El Dorado	Continuation beyond I-135
1.000 mi = 1.609 km; 1.000 km = 0.621 mi: Concurrency terminus; Incomplete access
