= K-96 (Kansas highway) =

State highway in Kansas, U.S.

K-96
- K-96 highlighted in red

Route information
- Maintained by KDOT
- Length: 300.201 mi (483.127 km)

Major junctions
- West end: SH 96 at the Colorado state line near Horace
- US-83 in Scott City; US-283 in Ness City; US-183 in Rush Center; US-56 / K-156 in Great Bend; US-281 in Great Bend; US-56 in Lyons; US-50 near South Hutchinson; I-235 in Wichita; I-135 / US-81 in Wichita; I-35 / Kansas Turnpike in Wichita
- East end: US-54 / US-400 in Wichita

Location
- Country: United States
- State: Kansas
- Counties: Greeley, Wichita, Scott, Lane, Ness, Rush, Barton, Rice, Reno, Sedgwick

Highway system
- Kansas State Highway System; Interstate; US; State; Spurs
← K-95	→ K-97

K-96 is a 300-mile-long (480 km) state highway in central and southern Kansas. Its western terminus is at the Colorado state line east of Towner, Colorado, where it continues as Colorado State Highway 96; its eastern terminus since 1999 is at U.S. Route 54/U.S. Route 400 in eastern Wichita.

The eastern terminus was once at the Missouri state line, where the road continued as Route 96. With the construction of US-400, K-96 was either concurrent with or bypassed by this road, and the road was decommissioned east of the current eastern terminus. It was concurrent with U.S. Route 75 between Neodesha and Independence; and from Independence to Columbus, it was replaced with a realigned U.S. Route 160. East of Alternate U.S. Route 69, it was turned over to Cherokee County. In Missouri, Missouri 96 was terminated at Route 171, and the section between Missouri 171 and the Kansas state line was turned into Missouri Supplemental Route YY.

== Route description ==
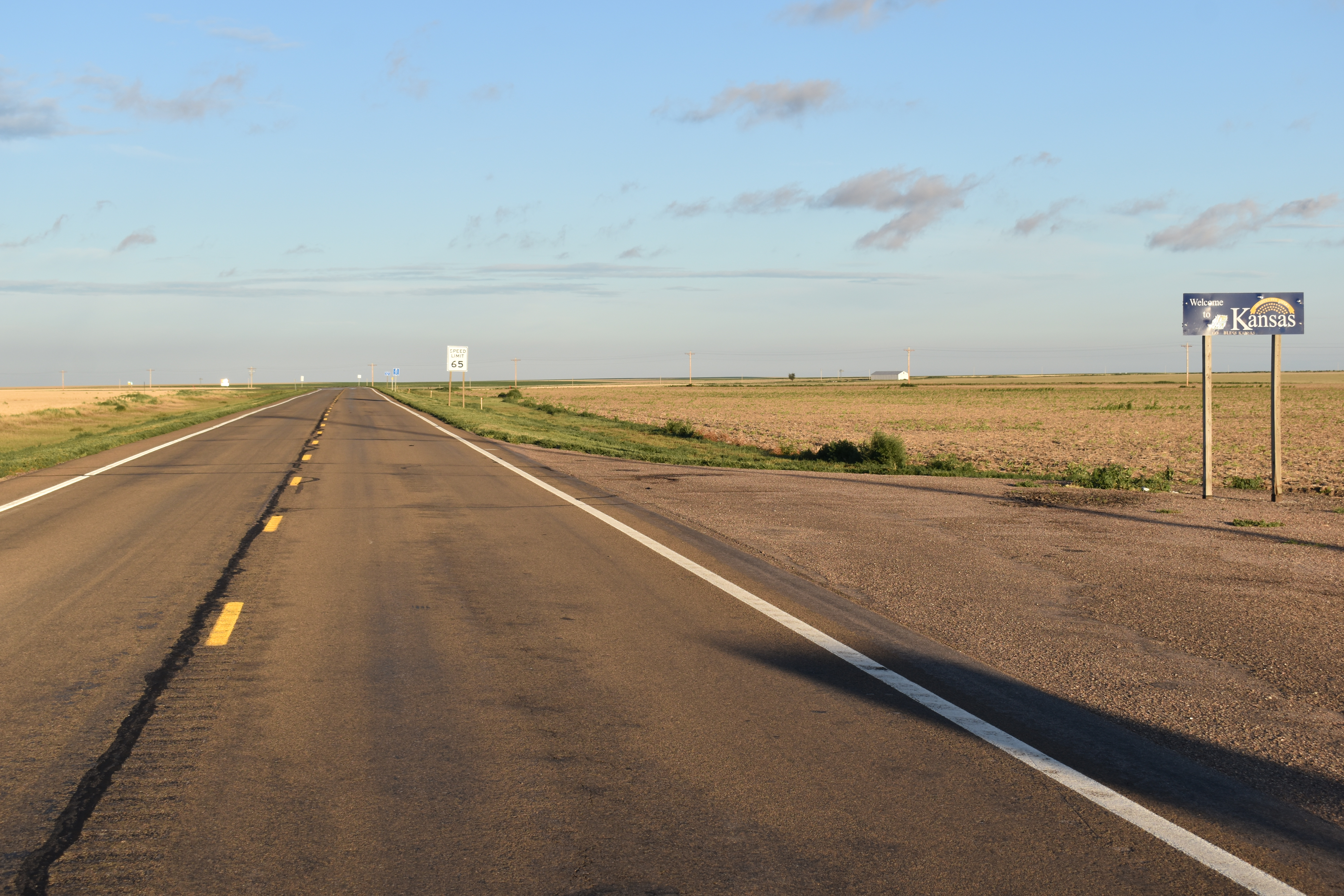
K-96 as it enters Kansas from Colorado

K-96 begins at the Colorado border in Greeley County, just east of Towner, Colorado. It heads east from this point, bypassing Horace to the south and crossing K-27 in Tribune. After crossing into Wichita County, it bypasses Selkirk to the south and meets K-25 in Leoti. It exits the city and travels roughly 8 miles, before running south of Marienthal. Here it intersects K-167 which connects to Marienthal. The highway then passes to the south of Modoc. K-96 reaches an intersection with US-83 in Scott City, followed by 24 miles (38.6 km) without another highway junction until K-23 at Dighton.

After leaving Dighton, K-96 runs parallel to Walnut Creek, providing access to a George Washington Carver Monument and passing north of Beeler. It meets US-283 at Ness City. East of Ness City, K-96 runs through Bazine, Alexander, and Nekoma. It crosses US-183 at Rush Center, then bypasses Timken and runs through Albert and Heizer, gradually curving south to enter Great Bend.

In Great Bend, K-96 begins a concurrency with US-56 and K-156 as it crosses US-281. Just past Great Bend, K-156 leaves the overlap and heads northeast towards Ellsworth. K-96 and US-56 continues east and pass through Ellinwood and Chase before entering Lyons, where K-96 heads south with K-14, while US-56 continues east to McPherson and Interstate 135. K-96 and K-14 pass through Sterling and then turn east. K-14 and K-96 continue east until Nickerson, where it takes a more southeast course to bypass Hutchinson to the west and south. Through South Hutchinson, it has a brief quadruple concurrency with US-50 and K-61.

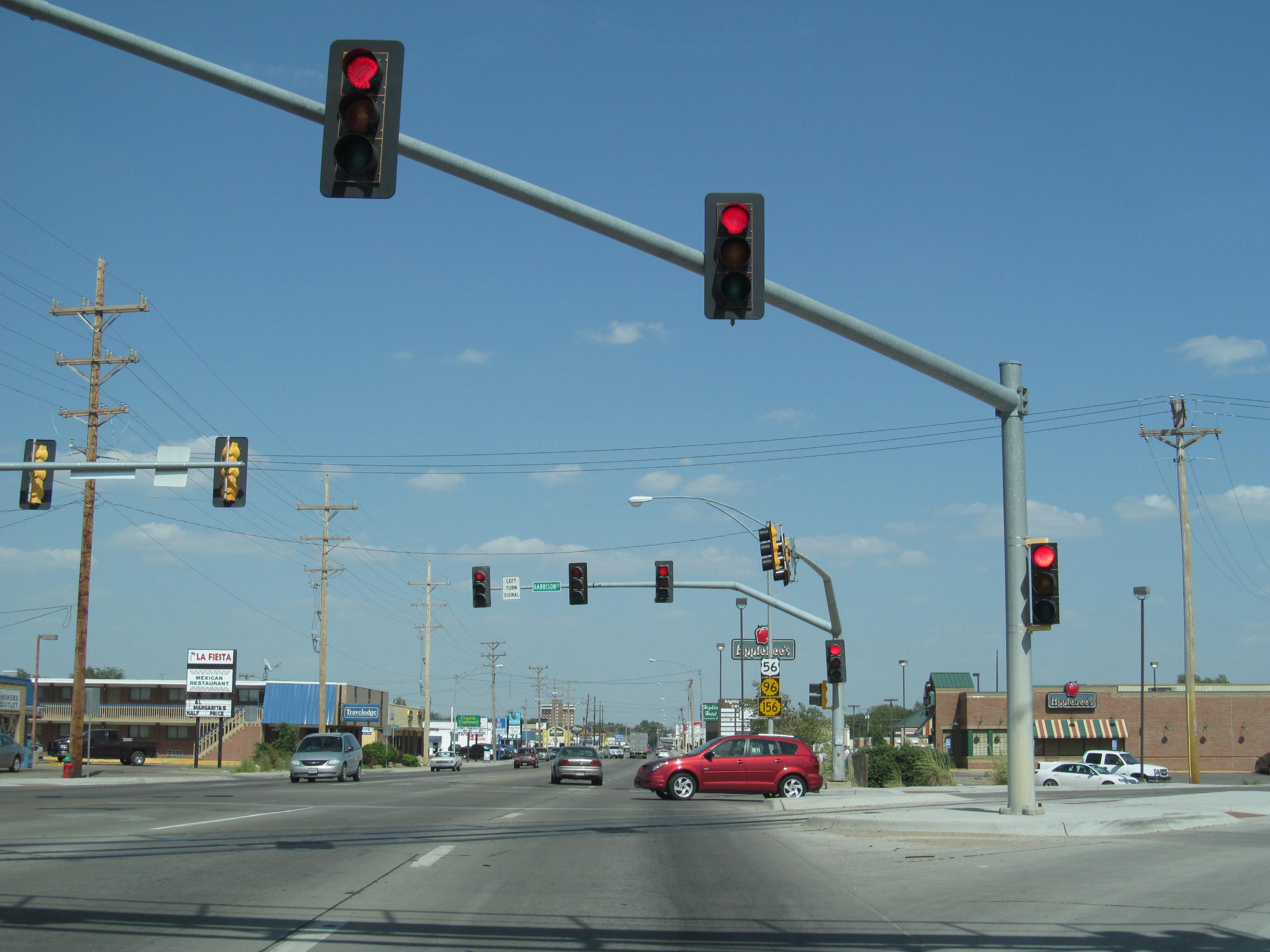
K-96 overlapped with US-56 and K-156

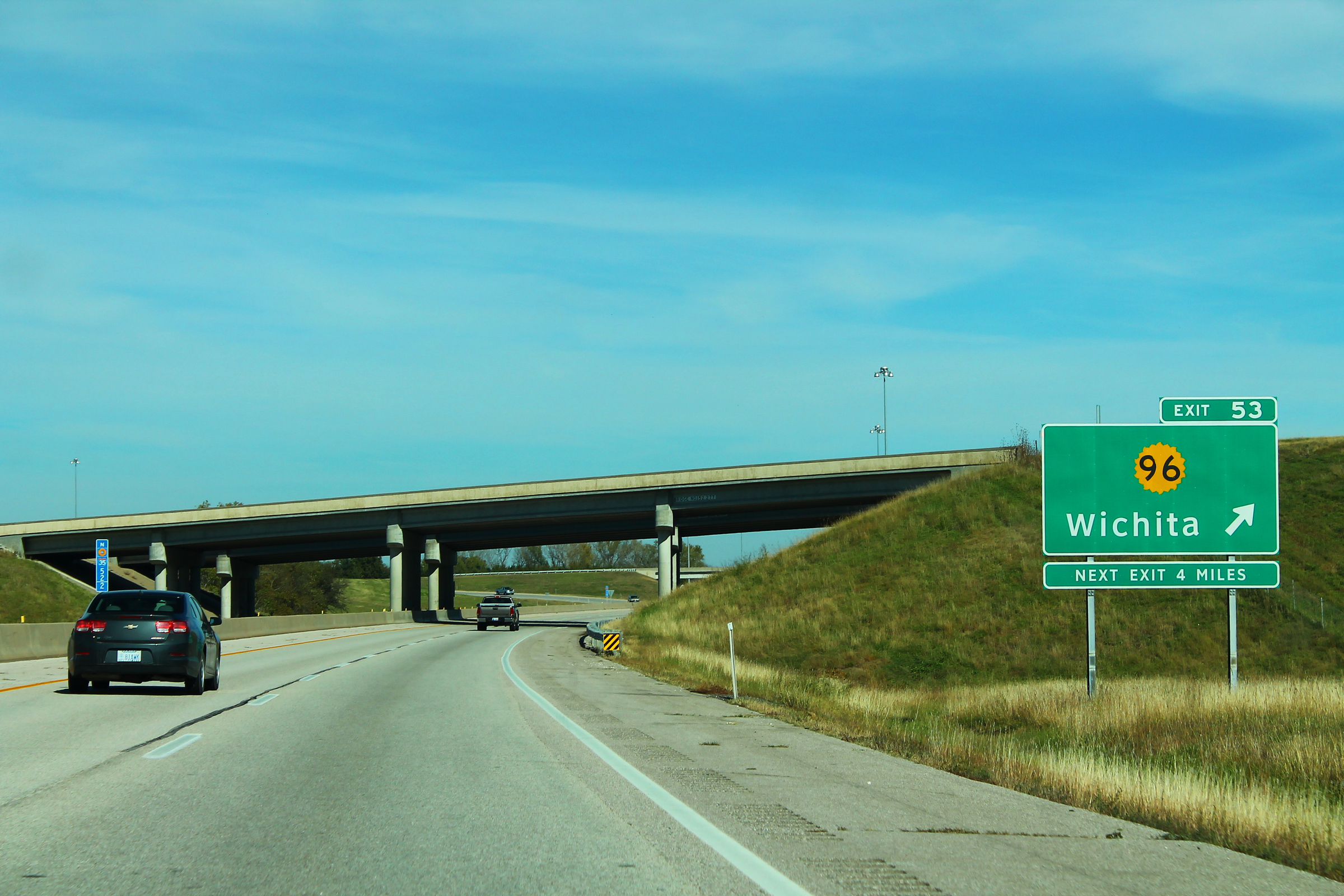
I-35 at its exit for K-96

After splitting from US-50 and K-61, K-14 splits off to continue south. K-96, heading southeast, provides access to, but does not directly serve, the Amish community of Yoder, while also going through Haven, Mount Hope, and Maize before entering Wichita. Throughout the Wichita metropolitan area, K-96 is a freeway. It concurs with Interstate 235 until that route ends at I-135, which it briefly follows southward until it splits off westbound onto its own freeway alignment. It continues eastbound until reaching the Jabara Airport, where it curves south. K-96 has an interchange (exit 53) with Interstate 35 (the Kansas Turnpike) before it ends at a trumpet interchange with US-54/400.

K-96 between Rush Center and Wichita is a part of the National Highway System.

Between Hutchinson and Wichita, K.S.A. 68-1044 designates K-96 as the State Fair Freeway (even though it is not a full freeway).

== History ==
The Wichita-Hutchinson segment was straightened in the early 1970s, bypassing the towns of Maize and Mount Hope. In recent years, urban sprawl has brought the highway within city limits. Near the Amish community of Yoder, symbolic warning signs were placed on the road to warn drivers of the presence of carriages on the cross streets.

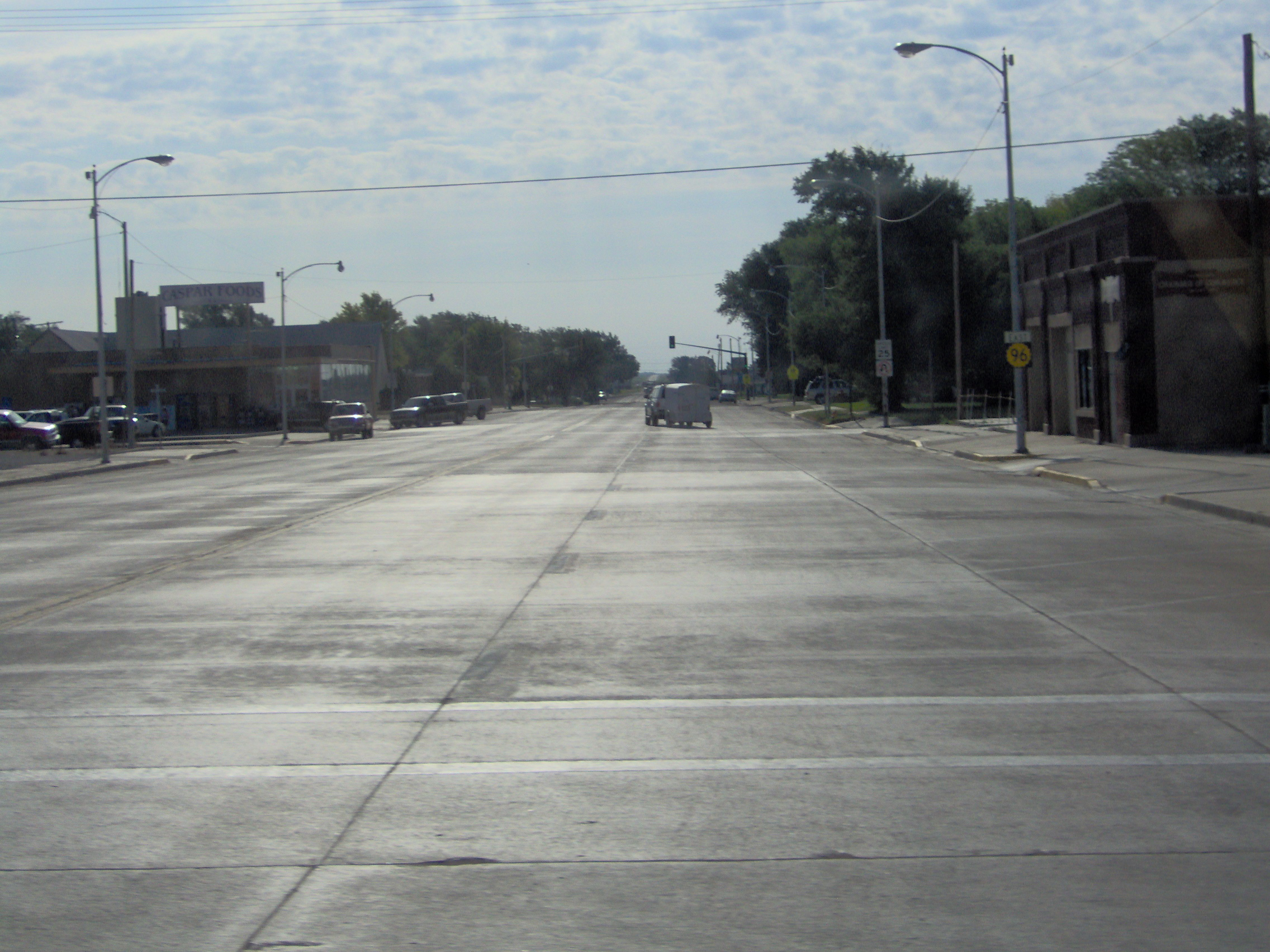
View along K-96 in Scott City

In a May 3, 1995 resolution, it was approved to move US-400 and K-96 to a new alignment between northwest of Fredonia and Neodesha, at that time the overlap with K-47 was removed. In a December 3, 1998 resolution, it was approved to truncate K-96 to end at US-400 by Wichita.

By 1996, the roadway had been widened to a four-lane expressway, and the symbolic warning signs near Yoder were not retained, as the signs did not comply with the Manual on Uniform Traffic Control Devices at the time. An interchange was built at Yoder Road; however, carriage traffic still crossed the roadway at-grade. In September 2000, a minivan heading home from the Kansas State Fair struck a carriage, killing the elderly occupants and their horses. The driver of the van claimed they could not see the carriage in time to avoid the crash, and was cleared of wrongdoing. The Kansas Department of Transportation received bad publicity in the wake of the crash because of the removal of the carriage warning signs. Despite the non-compliance with the MUTCD, new symbolic signs were installed along the roadway in 2001. The expressway segment of K-96 has been posted with a speed limit of 65 miles per hour (105 km/h) since the repeal of the national speed limit. This has also been a contention in crashes along this stretch, and some state legislators have attempted to write legislation to lower the speed limit along this stretch.

== Future ==
KDOT plans to realign K-96 and K-14 between the north end of the super two, southeast of Nickerson, to the current alignment north of Sterling, which will bypass Nickerson and Sterling. The new $96.5 million highway will be a super two, built on a four-lane right-of-way. As of October 2017, there were only three tracts in Rice County and two tracts in Reno County that needed to be purchased. In 2019, KDOT announced that construction is expected to begin in April 2021, and to be completed by November 2022. The project, part of a plan to build a diagonal corridor from Wichita northwest through Hutchinson and Great Bend to I-70 in Hays, was first considered by the state Legislature in 1986. Construction of the Reno and Rice county segment was originally going to begin January 2017 and be complete by June 2018, but was cancelled then due to lack of funding. On April 9, 2021, KDOT announced that the $81.7 million project will begin around April 26, 2021 and will be completed by June 16, 2023. The new section will be a super-two built to freeway standards, so it could be easily widened to four-lanes in the future. It will have a 70 mile-per-hour speed limit and no at-grade intersections. Diamond interchanges are going to be installed at 56th and Nickerson Boulevard in Reno County, as well as north of Sterling in Rice County. Bob Bergkamp Construction Company Incorporated of Wichita will be the primary contractor on the project.

As of 2026, KDOT is planning to reconstruct K-96 from I-135 to I-35 in Wichita. The project will widen 9.5 miles from four lanes to six lanes at a cost of $120 million. KDOT claims this is necessary to address congestion, despite the phenomenon of induced demand negating any congestion reduction.

== Major junctions ==
County	Location	mi	km	Exit	Destinations	Notes
Greeley		0.000	0.000		SH 96 west – Sheridan Lake	Continuation into Colorado
Greeley	Tribune	15.922	25.624		K-27 (Broadway Avenue)	
Wichita	Leoti	37.578	60.476		K-25 (4th Street) – Lakin, Russell Springs	
Wichita		45.449	73.143		K-167 north – Marienthal	Southern terminus of K-167
Scott	Scott City	62.058	99.873		US-83 (Main Street)	
Lane	Dighton	85.918	138.272		K-23 (Main Street) – Gove, Cimarron	
Ness	Ness City	117.161	188.552		US-283 (Pennsylvania Avenue) – Jetmore, WaKeeney	
Rush	Rush Center	149.772	241.035		US-183 – La Crosse, Kinsley	
Barton	Great Bend	179.549	288.956		US-56 / K-156 west (10th Street) – Larned	West end of US-56/K-156 concurrency; former US-156 west
Barton	Great Bend	181.326	291.816		US-281 (Main Street) – Russell, St. John	
Barton		185.121	297.923		K-156 east – Ellsworth	East end of K-156 concurrency; former US-156 east
Rice	Lyons	212.196	341.496		US-56 east (Main Street) / K-14 north (Grand Avenue) – Ellsworth, McPherson	East end of US-56 concurrency; west end of K-14 concurrency
Rice				—	Sterling	West end of super two
Reno				—	Nickerson Road	
Reno				—	56th Avenue – Nickerson	
Reno		238.909	384.487	—	Wilson Road / Nickerson Boulevard	
Reno		241.431	388.546	—	4th Avenue	
Reno		242.931	390.960	—	6th Avenue	
Reno		244.819	393.998	—	US-50 west / K-61 south (John Neal Memorial Highway) – Kinsley, Pratt	Partial cloverleaf interchange; east end of super two, west end of expressway section; west end of US-50/K-61 concurrency; former K-14 south
Reno	South Hutchinson	246.331	396.431		US-50 east / K-61 north (John Neal Memorial Highway) / Main Street north – Newton, McPherson	Interchange; east end of expressway section; east end of US-50/K-61 overlap; access to Hutchinson Regional Medical Center
Reno		249.056	400.817		K-14 south	East end of K-14 concurrency; former K-17
Reno	Yoder	253.892	408.600		Yoder Road	Interchange
Sedgwick		278.627	448.407		119th Street West	At-grade intersection; west end of freeway section
Sedgwick	Maize	279.669	450.084	—	Maize Road / 53rd Street North	Maize Rd. is former K-296 west
Sedgwick	Wichita	282.419	454.509	—	Ridge Road	
Sedgwick	Wichita	283.466	456.194	—	Hoover Road	Westbound exit and eastbound entrance
Sedgwick	Wichita	284.469	457.808	—	West Street	
Sedgwick	Wichita	286.015– 286.503	460.297– 461.082	—	I-235 south	Eastbound exit and westbound left entrance; I-235 exit 13
Sedgwick	Wichita	286.015– 286.503	460.297– 461.082	—	Meridian Avenue Valley Center	Eastbound signage Westbound signage
Sedgwick	Wichita	286.015– 286.503	460.297– 461.082	—	I-235 south	West end of I-235 concurrency; westbound left exit and eastbound left entrance; I-235 exit 13
Sedgwick	Wichita	287.473	462.643	15	Broadway Street	Exit number follows I-235
Sedgwick	Wichita	288.413	464.156	—	I-235 ends / I-135 north / US-81 north / K-15 north – Salina K-254 east – El Dorado	Western terminus of K-254; east end of I-235 concurrency; I-235 exit 16A; west end of I-135/US-81/K-15 concurrency; I-135 exit 11B
Sedgwick	Wichita	289.619	466.097	—	I-135 south / US-81 south / K-15 south	East end of I-135/US-81/K-15 concurrency; I-135 exit 10
Sedgwick	Wichita	289.710	466.243	—	29th Street North / Hydraulic Avenue	No westbound entrance
Sedgwick	Wichita	290.714	467.859	—	Hillside Street	
Sedgwick	Wichita	291.749	469.525	—	Oliver Avenue	
Sedgwick	Wichita	292.749	471.134	—	Woodlawn Road	
Sedgwick	Wichita	293.725	472.705	—	Rock Road	
Sedgwick	Wichita	294.908	474.608	—	Webb Road	
Sedgwick	Wichita	296.086	476.504	—	Greenwich Road	
Sedgwick	Wichita	296.886	477.792	—	21st Street North	
Sedgwick	Wichita	297.895	479.416	—	13th Street North	
Sedgwick	Wichita	299.450	481.918	—	I-35 / Kansas Turnpike / 127th Street East	I-35/Kansas Tpke. exit 53 northbound, 53B southbound
Sedgwick	Wichita	300.201	483.127	—	US-54 / US-400 – Augusta	Eastern terminus; trumpet interchange
1.000 mi = 1.609 km; 1.000 km = 0.621 mi: Concurrency terminus; Incomplete access; Route transition
