= Interstate 35 in Kansas =

Section of Interstate Highway in Kansas, United States

Interstate 35
- I-35 highlighted in red

Route information
- Maintained by KTA and KDOT
- Length: 235.53 mi (379.05 km)
- NHS: Entire route

Major junctions
- South end: I-35 at the Oklahoma state line near South Haven
- I-135 in Wichita; US-54 / US-400 in Wichita; US-77 in El Dorado; I-335 / Kansas Turnpike in Emporia; US-50 in Emporia; I-435 / US-50 in Lenexa; I-635 in Kansas City; US-69 in Kansas City
- North end: I-35 at the Missouri state line in Kansas City

Location
- Country: United States
- State: Kansas
- Counties: Sumner, Sedgwick, Butler, Chase, Lyon, Coffey, Osage, Franklin, Miami, Johnson, Wyandotte

Highway system
- Interstate Highway System; Main; Auxiliary; Suffixed; Business; Future; Kansas State Highway System; Interstate; US; State; Spurs
← K-34	→ US-36

Interstate 35 (I-35) is an Interstate Highway in the US that runs from the Mexican border near Laredo, Texas, to Duluth, Minnesota. In Kansas, the highway goes from the Oklahoma border to Kansas City at the Missouri border, with a length of 235 miles (378 km). Along the way, I-35 passes through Wichita, the state's largest city, linking it to Emporia, Ottawa, and Kansas City and its Johnson County suburbs. The section of the route from the Oklahoma border to I-335 is part of the Kansas Turnpike.

== Route description ==
=== Oklahoma border to Emporia ===
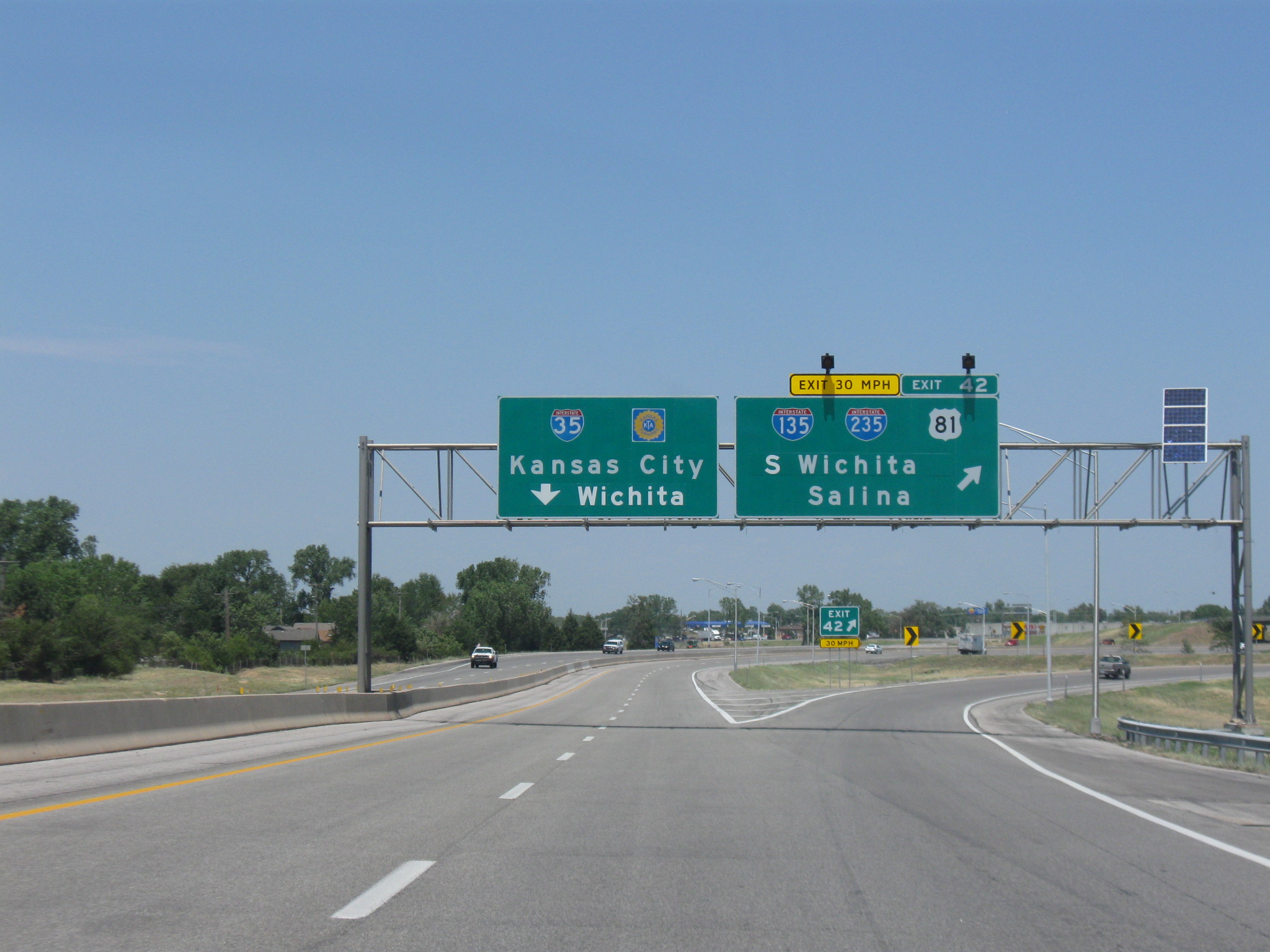
I-35 at exit for I-135, I-235, and US-81

I-35 enters Kansas from Oklahoma where the southern terminus of the Kansas Turnpike is located. After passing U.S. Highway 166 (US-166, East 160th Street South, exit 4) to the east of South Haven, the Interstate passes through a toll plaza, making I-35 into a toll road. The highway then passes US-160 (East 10th Avenue, exit 19) east of Wellington, then the Belle Plaine Service Area, the first of three on I-35, and the first of six on the turnpike. After the service area, the turnpike continues due north to Wichita and intersects I-135 (exit 42). After the I-135 interchange, the turnpike turns northeast and goes around Downtown Wichita. I-35 passes through Wichita's suburbs and, in the process, intersects US-54/US-400 (East Kellogg Avenue, exit 53A). The Towanda Service Area lies 10 miles (16 km) north of the Wichita area. Thereafter, the route intersects US-77 (North Main Street, exit 76) and various state highways near El Dorado. After El Dorado, the highway enters the Flint Hills region of Kansas. After passing the Cassoday interchange (K-177, exit 92), the turnpike begins its 35-mile-long (56 km) stretch with no exits. The only stop along the way is the Matfield Green Service Area. Located five miles (8.0 km) north of Cassoday, it is also the last service area on I-35. After the remaining 30 miles (48 km) with no exits or services, I-35 leaves the turnpike in Emporia. Here, the Interstate meets I-335 (exit 127), which the Turnpike carries toward Topeka.

=== Emporia to Kansas City ===
I-35 passes through a toll plaza to continue on its own alignment running eastward through east-central Kansas. At Ottawa, it turns to a more northeasterly direction. After passing through the Kansas suburbs of the Kansas City Metro Area, it then crosses the state line into Missouri and into Downtown Kansas City.

== History ==
The original plan for I-35 was to follow US-50 from Newton, as well as US-81 and US-177 to the Oklahoma state line. But when the Kansas Turnpike was created, a part of I-35 was created south of Emporia. The Newton segment was declined, and there was another routing for US-50 that traveled north (which is known today). The segments from Olathe to Shawnee were created by 1962. The relocations of US-75 and K-31 were finished by 1975. I-35 in Kansas (as known today) had its final modification in 1976.

The Kansas Department of Transportation (KDOT) worked with the Burns & McDonnell engineering company to design a new interchange at Homestead Lane (exit 205) in Johnson County as a diverging diamond. The first interchange of its kind in the state, it opened September 28, 2013.

In the 2020s, the entire I-35 corridor was designated as an Alternative Fuel Corridor for electric vehicles.

== Exit list ==
County	Location	mi	km	Exit	Destinations	Notes
Sumner	Guelph Township	0.00	0.00		I-35 south – Oklahoma City Kansas Turnpike begins	Continuation into Oklahoma; southern terminus of Kansas Turnpike
Sumner	Guelph Township	4.06	6.53	4	US-166 to US-81 – Arkansas City, South Haven	Last free exit northbound
Sumner	Avon Township	19.20	30.90	19	US-160 – Winfield, Wellington	
Sumner	Harmon Township	25.83	41.57	Belle Plaine service area		
Sumner–Sedgwick county line	Belle Plaine–Salem township line	33.42	53.78	33	K-53 to US-81 – Mulvane	
Sedgwick	Salem Township	39.14	62.99	39	To US-81 – Haysville, Derby	
Sedgwick	Wichita	42.10	67.75	42	I-135 to I-235 / US-81 – South Wichita, Salina	
Sedgwick	Wichita	44.54	71.68	45	K-15 – Wichita	
Sedgwick	Wichita	49.66	79.92	50	Webb Road	
Sedgwick	Wichita	52	84	53A	US-54 / US-400 west (Kellogg Avenue)	No northbound exit
Sedgwick	Wichita	52.67	84.76	53B	K-96 to US-54 / US-400 east	Signed as exit 53 northbound
Butler	Bruno Township	57.07	91.85	57	Andover	
Butler	Towanda Township	64.90	104.45	Towanda service area		
Butler	El Dorado	70.63	113.67	71	K-254 to K-196 – El Dorado	
Butler	El Dorado	75.69	121.81	76	US-77 / Nick Badwey Plaza – El Dorado North	
Butler	Cassoday	92.73	149.23	92	K-177 – Cassoday	
Chase	Matfield Township	97.00	156.11	Matfield Green service area		
Lyon	Emporia	126.92	204.26	127A	I-335 north / Kansas Turnpike north – Topeka, Kansas City	Northern end of Kansas Turnpike concurrency; southern terminus of I-335; signed as exit 127 northbound
Lyon	Emporia	127.36	204.97	127B	US-50 – Emporia, Newton	Last free exit southbound
Lyon	Emporia	128.18	206.29	128	Industrial Road	
Lyon	Emporia	130.26	209.63	130	K-99 (Merchant Street)	
Lyon	Emporia	131.57	211.74	131	Burlingame Road	
Lyon	Emporia	132.86	213.82	133	US-50 west (6th Avenue)	Southern end of US-50 concurrency
Lyon	Jackson Township	135.21	217.60	135	County Road R1	
Lyon	Jackson Township	138.08	222.22	138	County Road U	
Lyon	Jackson Township	141.09	227.06	141	K-130 – Neosho Rapids, Hartford	
Coffey	Lebo	148.31	238.68	148	K-131 – Lebo	
Coffey	Key West Township	155.34	250.00	155	US-75 – Lyndon, Burlington	
Osage	Melvern	160.49	258.28	160	K-31 north – Melvern	Western end of K-31 concurrency
Osage	Melvern	162.53	261.57	162	K-31 south – Waverly	Eastern end of K-31 concurrency
Franklin	Williamsburg	170.07	273.70	170	Williamsburg, Pomona	Formerly designated as K-273
Franklin	Homewood Township	176.22	283.60	176	Homewood	
Franklin	Ottawa	181.89	292.72	182	Eisenhower Road	
Franklin	Ottawa	182.94	294.41	183	US-59 south – Garnett	Southern end of US-59 concurrency
Franklin	Harrison Township	185.27	298.16	185	15th Street	
Franklin	Ottawa	187.28	301.40	187	K-68 – Ottawa, Louisburg	
Franklin	Ottawa	188.52	303.39	188	US-59 north – Lawrence	Northern end of US-59 concurrency
Franklin	Franklin Township	192.79	310.27	193	Tennessee Road	
Franklin	Wellsville	197.77	318.28	198	K-33 – Wellsville	
Miami	No major junctions					
Johnson	Edgerton	202.77	326.33	202	Sunflower Road – Edgerton	
Johnson	Gardner Township	204.96	329.85	205	Homestead Lane	Diverging diamond interchange
Johnson	Gardner	207.47	333.89	207	Gardner Road	
Johnson	Gardner	210.60	338.93	210	US-56 west – Gardner	Southern end of US-56 concurrency
Johnson	Olathe	213.83	344.13	214	Lone Elm Road / 159th Street	
Johnson	Olathe	215.35	346.57	215	US-169 south / K-7 – Paola	Southern end of US-169 concurrency
Johnson	Olathe	216.61	348.60	217	Old Highway 56	Southbound exit and northbound entrance
Johnson	Olathe	217.81	350.53	218	Santa Fe Street	
Johnson	Olathe	220.14	354.28	220	119th Street	
Johnson	Lenexa	222.34	357.82	222A	I-435 east / US-50 east	Northern end of US-50 concurrency; I-435 exit 83; access to Johnson County Community College
Johnson	Lenexa	222.34	357.82	222B	I-435 west to K-10 – Lawrence	I-435 exit 83
Johnson	Lenexa	223.80	360.17	224	95th Street	Diverging diamond interchange; access to Pittsburg State University and Brown Mackie College
Johnson	Lenexa–Overland Park line	225.05	362.18	225A	87th Street Parkway	Access to Legler Barn Museum
Johnson	Overland Park–Lenexa line	225.05	362.18	225C	75th Street	Northbound exit only; access to AdventHealth Shawnee Mission
Johnson	Lenexa	225.54	362.97	225B	US-69 south (Overland Parkway)	Southern end of US-69 concurrency; southbound exit and northbound entrance
Johnson	Overland Park–Merriam line	226.93	365.21	227	75th Street	No northbound exit; access to AdventHealth Shawnee Mission
Johnson	Merriam	227.97	366.88	228A	67th Street	
Johnson	Merriam	228.49	367.72	228B	US-56 east / US-69 / US-169 north (Shawnee Mission Parkway)	Northern end of US-56 / US-69 / US-169 concurrency
Johnson	Merriam	228.99	368.52	229	Johnson Drive	
Johnson	Merriam–Overland Park line	229.90	369.99	230	Antioch Road	
Johnson	Overland Park	230.74	371.34	231	I-635 north	Northbound exit and southbound entrance; I-635 exit 1A; southern terminus of I-635
Johnson	Overland Park	230.74	371.34	231A-B	I-635 north US-69 south (Metcalf Avenue)	Signed as exits 231A (I-635) and 231B (US-69); southern end of US-69 concurrency; southbound exit and northbound entrance; I-635 exit 1A; southern terminus of I-635; access to KCI Airport
Johnson	Mission	231.70	372.89	232A	Lamar Avenue	
Wyandotte	Kansas City	232.27	373.80	232B	US-69 (18th Street Expressway) / Roe Avenue	Northern end of US-69 concurrency
Wyandotte	Kansas City	233.46– 233.86	375.72– 376.36	233	Southwest Boulevard / Mission Road	Southbound exit has additional ramp to 37th Ave
Wyandotte	Kansas City	234.56	377.49	234	US-169 (7th Street Trafficway / Rainbow Boulevard)	
Kansas–Missouri line		235.25	378.60	235	Cambridge Circle	
Kansas–Missouri line		235.30	378.68		I-35 north	Continuation into Missouri
1.000 mi = 1.609 km; 1.000 km = 0.621 mi: Concurrency terminus; Incomplete access; Tolled

== Auxiliary routes ==
There are five auxiliary routes branching directly or indirectly from I-35 in Kansas:

- I-135: a spur route from Wichita to Salina; originally signed as I-35W until September 1976
  - I-235: a loop around the westside of Wichita; branches off of I-135
- I-335 / Kansas Turnpike: a segment of the Kansas Turnpike connecting I-35 in Emporia to the state capital, Topeka
- I-435: the Kansas City beltway
- I-635: a bypass of downtown Kansas City providing access to I-29 in Missouri and Kansas City International Airport

Interstate 35
Previous state: Oklahoma	Kansas	Next state: Missouri
