= Haverhill, Kansas =

Unincorporated community in Butler County, Kansas

- Unincorporated community
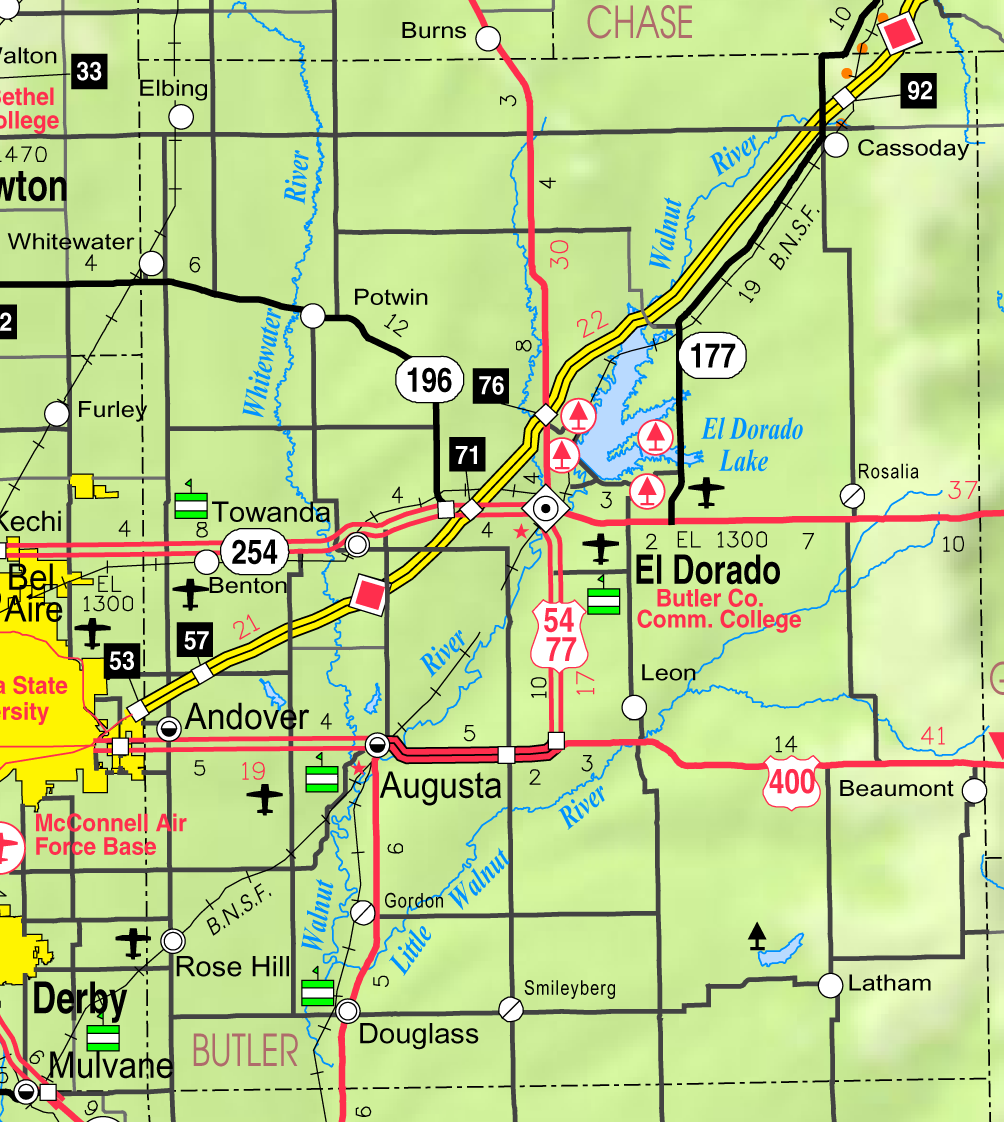
- KDOT map of Butler County (legend)

- Location within Kansas Location within the United States
- Coordinates: 37°41′8″N 96°52′59″W
- Country: United States
- State: Kansas
- County: Butler
- Elevation: 1,326 ft (404 m)
- Time zone: UTC-6 (CST)
  - Summer (DST): UTC-5 (CDT)
- FIPS code: 20-30800
- GNIS ID: 474818

Haverhill is an unincorporated community in Butler County, Kansas, United States. It is located about 4.5 miles (7.2 km) east of Augusta.

== History ==
A post office was opened in Haverhill in 1880, and remained in operation until it was discontinued in 1933.

Haverhill was a station and shipping point on the St. Louis–San Francisco Railway.

== Education ==
The community is served by Bluestem USD 205 public school district.
