= K-103 (Kansas highway) =

State highway in Kansas, U.S.

K-103
- K-103 highlighted in red

Route information
- Maintained by KDOT
- Length: 6.980 mi (11.233 km)
- Existed: c. 1936–present

Major junctions
- West end: K-7 south of Cherokee
- East end: US-69 / US-160 / US-400 south of Pittsburg

Location
- Country: United States
- State: Kansas
- Counties: Cherokee

Highway system
- Kansas State Highway System; Interstate; US; State; Spurs
← K-102	→ K-104

K-103 is a 6.980-mile-long (11.233 km) east–west state highway located entirely in Cherokee County in the U.S. state of Kansas. K-103's western terminus is at K-7 south of the City of Cherokee and the eastern terminus is at U.S. Route 69 (US-69), US-160 and US-400 south of the City of Pittsburg. Along the way the route passes through the City of Weir.

K-103 was designated as a state highway by 1936, and extended from US-160 east to US-69. Then in 1958, US-160 was realigned east along K-103 from K-103's original western terminus to K-7 then continued east along K-104 to US-69, and at that time K-103 was truncated to its current western terminus.

== Route description ==
K-103's western terminus is at an at-grade intersection with K-7 south of Cherokee. The highway travels east through lightly forested rural farmland. After roughly .5 miles (0.80 km) it reaches an at-grade crossing with a BNSF Railway track. It then intersects NE 10th Street, which travels south to Scammon. K-103 crosses Little Cherry Creek before reaching the city of Weir. Inside the city K-103 becomes West Main Street. In downtown Weir the highway reaches Washington Street where it becomes East Main Street. It continues east for roughly .75 miles (1.21 km) to Madison Street where it exits the city. K-103 passes through rural farmland for about 2.5 miles (4.0 km) then crosses Brush Creek, a tributary of Cow Creek. Shortly after, K-103 reaches its eastern terminus at an at-grade intersection with US-69, US-160 and US-400.

The route is maintained by KDOT, which is responsible for constructing and maintaining highways in the state. As part of this role, KDOT regularly surveys traffic on their highways. These surveys are most often presented in the form of annual average daily traffic, which is a measurement of the number of vehicles that use a highway during an average day of the year. In 2024, KDOT calculated that a total of 770 vehicles, and 102 trucks, used the road daily near the eastern terminus. K-103 is not included in the National Highway System. The National Highway System is a system of highways important to the nation's defense, economy, and mobility. K-103 does connect to the National Highway System at its eastern terminus.

== History ==
=== Early roads ===
Before state highways were numbered in Kansas there were Auto trails, which were an informal network of marked routes that existed in the United States and Canada in the early part of the 20th century. K-103's western terminus (K-7) was part of the Jefferson Highway and Kansas City-Fort Scott-Miami-Tulsa Short Line auto trails.

=== Establishment and realignments ===
K-103 first appears as a state highway on the 1936 Cherokee County map. It extended from US-160 east for 10 miles (16 km) to K-7 then overlapped K-7 south for 2 miles (3.2 km) then left K-7 and travelled east through Weir to end at US-69. In a September 17, 1942 meeting, it was approved to realign K-103 as a spur from Weir northward to a new alignment of US-160. But then in a September 30, 1943 resolution, that plan was cancelled due to restrictions imposed on the State Highway Commission caused by World War II. Then in 1958, US-160 was realigned east along K-103 from K-103's original western terminus to K-7 then continued east along K-104 to US-69. At that time K-103 was truncated to its current western terminus and the K-104 designation was removed.

== Major intersections ==
The entire route is in Cherokee County.

Location	mi	km	Destinations	Notes
Mineral Township–Ross Township line	0.000	0.000	K-7 – Columbus, Girard	Western terminus
Pleasant View Township	6.980	11.233	US-69 / US-160 / US-400 – Pittsburg, Baxter Springs	Eastern terminus
1.000 mi = 1.609 km; 1.000 km = 0.621 mi
