= Southeast USD 247 =

Public school district in Cherokee, Kansas

Address
- 506 S. Smelter St. Cherokee, Kansas, 66724; United States
- Coordinates: 37.3408°N 94.8325°W

District information
- Type: Public
- Grades: K to 12
- Schools: 3

Other information
- Website: usd247.com

Southeast USD 247 is a public unified school district headquartered in Cherokee, Kansas, United States. The district includes the communities of Cherokee, McCune, Sherman, Weir, West Mineral, and nearby rural areas. Counties which include portions of the district include Crawford and Cherokee.

== Schools ==
The school district operates the following schools:

- Southeast High School
- Southeast Middle School
- Southeast Elementary School

== History ==
In 2007, Cherokee USD 247 was renamed to Southeast USD 247.

== See also ==
- Kansas State Department of Education
- Kansas State High School Activities Association
- List of high schools in Kansas
- List of unified school districts in Kansas
