= Ross Township, Kansas =

Ross Township, Kansas may refer to one of the following places:

- Ross Township, Cherokee County, Kansas
- Ross Township, Osborne County, Kansas

== See also ==
- Ross Township (disambiguation)
