= K-7 (Kansas highway) =

State highway in Kansas, U.S.

K-7
- K-7 highlighted in red

Route information
- Maintained by KDOT and the cities of Columbus, Girard, Olathe, Leavenworth and Atchison
- Length: 240.606 mi (387.218 km)
- Existed: 1927–present

Major junctions
- South end: US 69 at the Oklahoma border north of Picher, OK
- US-166 near Cravensville; US-69 / US-160 in Columbus; US-400 in Cherokee; US-69 / US-54 in Fort Scott; US-169 from Osawatomie to Olathe; I-35 / US-50 / US-56 in Olathe; I-70 / Kansas Turnpike / US-24 / US-40 in Bonner Springs; US-73 from Bonner Springs to Atchison; US-59 in Atchison; US-36 west of Troy
- North end: Nebraska border north of White Cloud

Location
- Country: United States
- State: Kansas
- Counties: Cherokee, Crawford, Bourbon, Linn, Miami, Johnson, Wyandotte, Leavenworth, Atchison, Doniphan

Highway system
- Kansas State Highway System; Interstate; US; State; Spurs
← K-6	→ K-8

K-7 is a 240.606-mile-long (387.218 km) state highway in the U.S. state of Kansas. It is mostly a small country highway winding its way through the Osage Questas and Glaciated Regions of eastern Kansas, although a portion of the highway passes through the Kansas City metropolitan area. Significant portions of the highway overlap with U.S. Route 169 (US-169) and US-73. It also has junctions with two Interstate highways, Interstate 35 (I-35) in Olathe and I-70 in Bonner Springs. The portion of K-7 between Leavenworth and the Nebraska state line has been designated the "Glacial Hills Scenic Byway."

== Route description ==
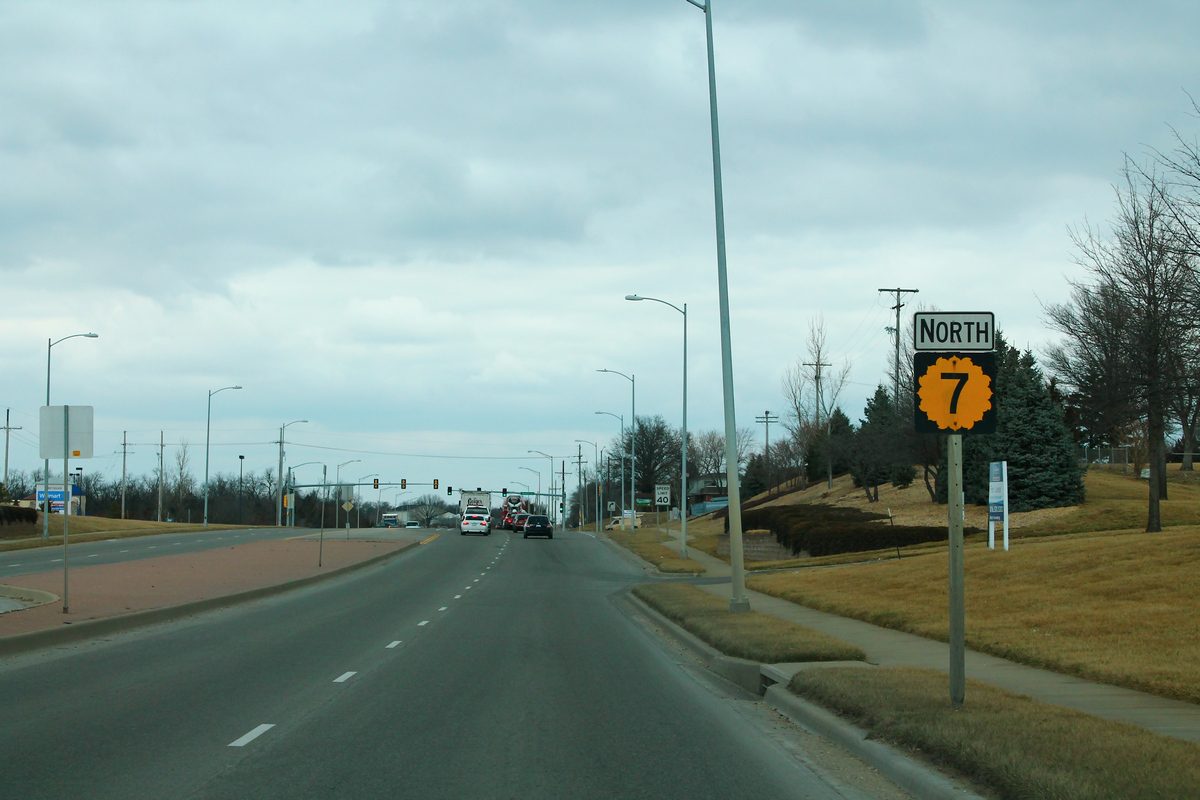
K-7 northbound in Olathe just north of the Santa Fe intersection

The Kansas Department of Transportation (KDOT) tracks the traffic levels on its highways, and in 2018, they determined that on average the traffic varied from 100 vehicles per day slightly south of the overlap with K-31 to 32200 vehicles per day slightly north of K-10 interchange. The AADT was 195 vehicles per day near the northern terminus and 2040 vehicles per day near the southern terminus. The section of K-7 that overlaps US-69 and US-54 by Fort Scott and the section from the south end of the US-169 overlap by Osawatomie north to US-59 in Atchison is included in the National Highway System. The National Highway System is a system of highways important to the nation's defense, economy, and mobility. K-7 also connects to the National Highway System at its junctions with US-166, US-160 in Columbus, and US-36 north of Atchison. The .333 miles (0.536 km) section of K-7 in Columbus is maintained by the city. The 1.518 miles (2.443 km) section within Girard is maintained by the city. The section of K-7 from I-35 to Harold Street in Olathe is maintained by the city. The section of K-7 in Leavenworth from Limit Street north to the end of the overlap with K-92 is maintained by the city. The entire section within Atchison is maintained by the city.

=== Oklahoma to Fort Scott ===
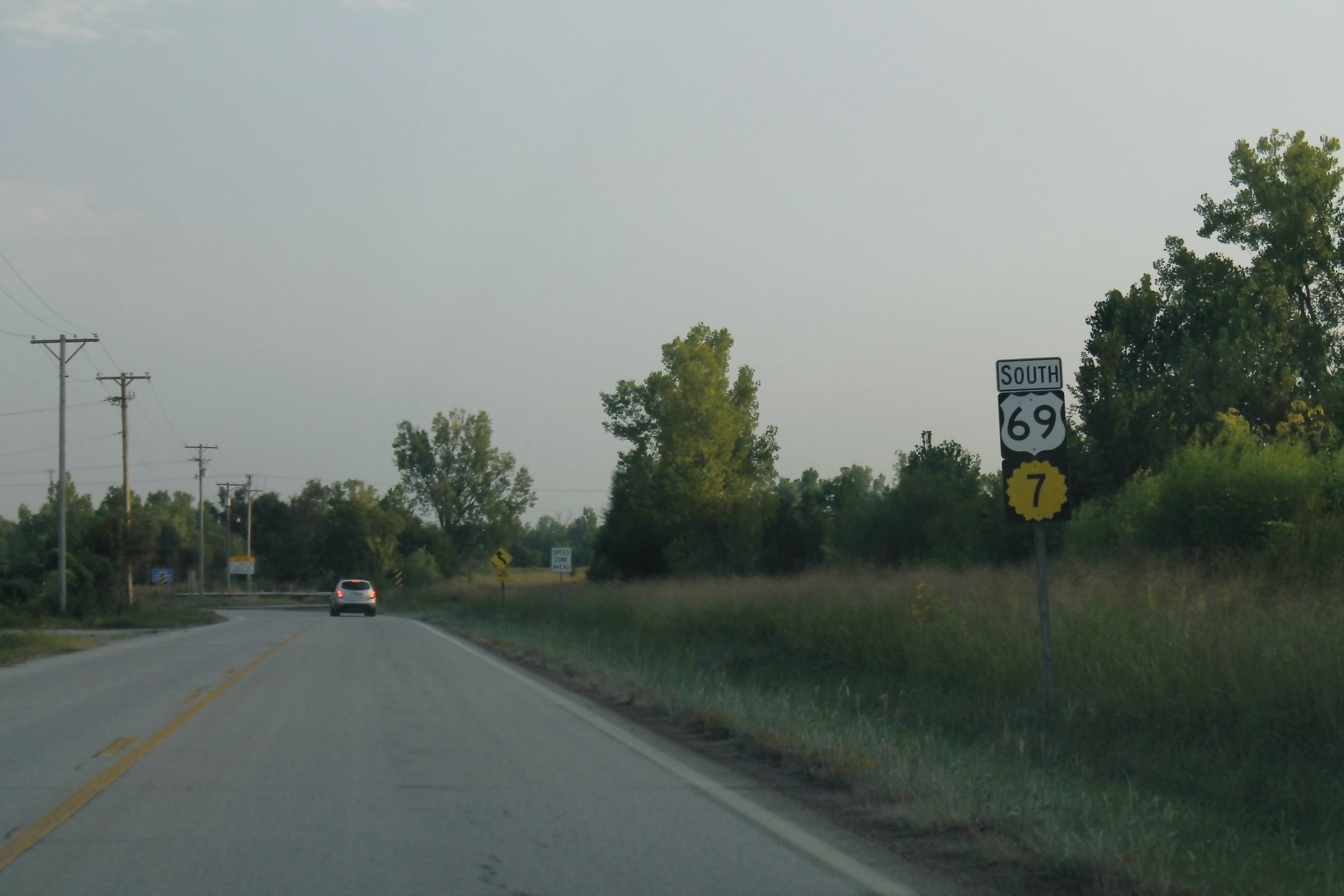
K-7 and US-69 southbound near Oklahoma border

K-7 begins at the Oklahoma–Kansas state line. concurrent with US-69. K-7 and US-69 split at an intersection with US-160 in Columbus. K-7 then goes north to Scammon, where it meets K-102. It then intersects K-103 roughly 2 miles (3.2 km) north of Scammon before intersecting US-400 at Cherokee. Five miles north of Cherokee, it intersects K-126 and then intersects K-47 at Girard. It then continues north from Girard, passing just west of Farlington. Near Hiattville, it intersects K-39 and turns east, then northeast. Five miles south of Fort Scott, K-7 intersects US-69 at a freeway interchange, and K-7 overlaps with US-69 into Fort Scott.

=== Fort Scott to Olathe ===
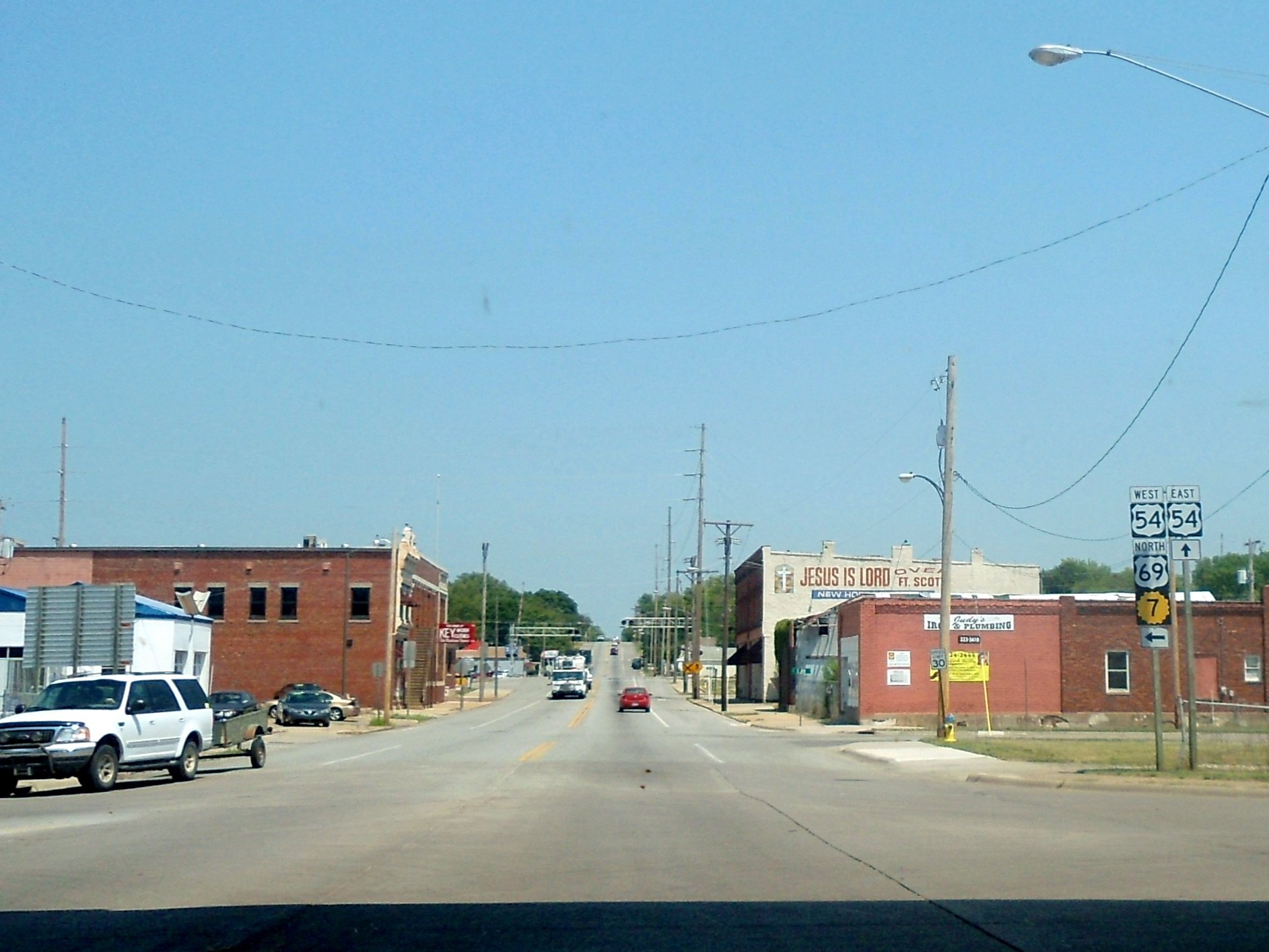
View of US-54 east from under US-69 / K-7 overpass, showing sign for northbound K-7 on-ramp

While in Fort Scott, K-7 and US-69 intersect US-54 and K-7 overlaps with US-54 west for four miles (6 km). It then turns north again, and alternates between going north and going west before entering Devon. It continues north to K-31, with which it overlaps for a mile going east. It then turns north and goes through Mound City, intersecting K-52 there. It goes north-northwesterly for 16 miles (26 km) and intersects K-152 east of Parker. It goes north, then west for 9 miles (14 km), then at Beagle, turns north and intersects US-169 south of Osawatomie. While overlapping US-169, it follows a freeway alignment that bypasses Osawatomie and Paola before meeting K-68. After K-68, the freeway bypasses Hillsdale and Spring Hill before turning into expressway. The overlap with US-169 ends at its intersection with I-35, US-50 and US-56 at Olathe.

=== Olathe to Bonner Springs ===
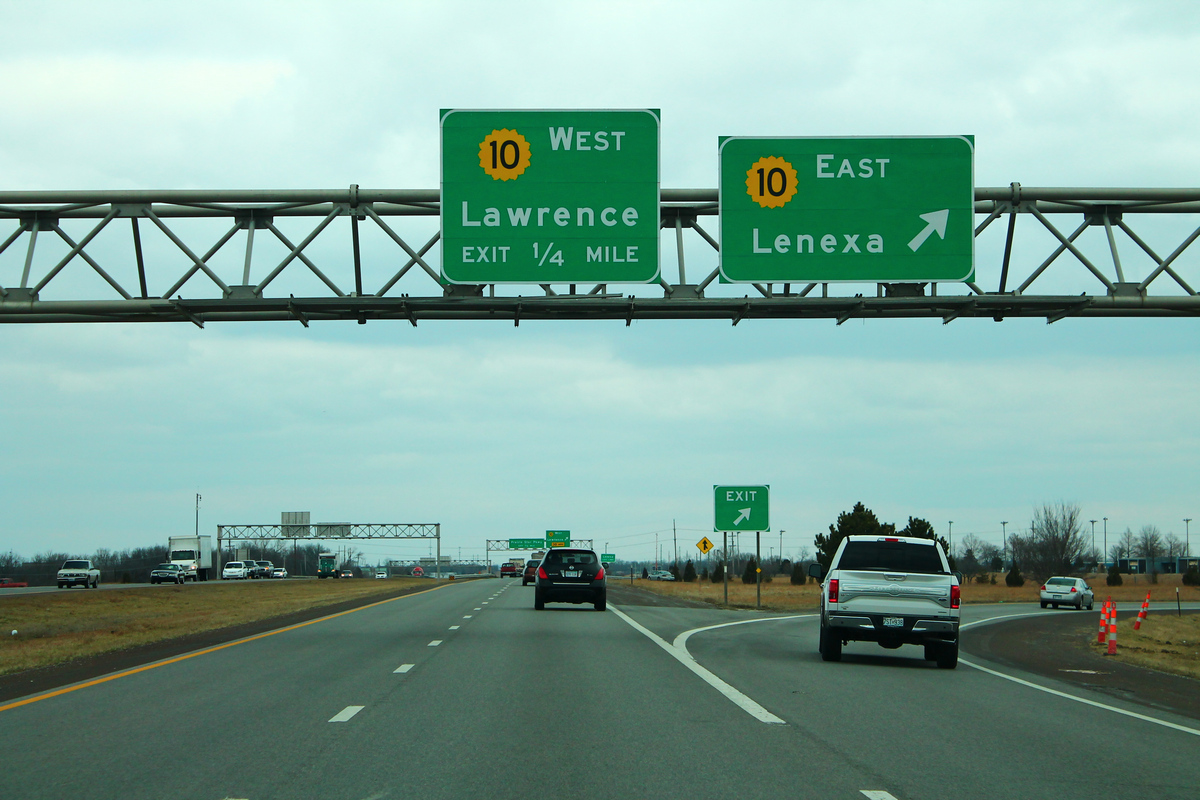
K-7 northbound at interchange with K-10

In Olathe, K-7 alternates between northbound and westbound routings before turning north and becoming freeway. On the border between Olathe and Lenexa, K-7 intersects the K-10 freeway. It continues north, then turns northwest to cross the Kansas River and enter Bonner Springs, where it immediately intersects K-32. It turns north to intersect I-70, the Kansas Turnpike, then turns northwest to intersect US-24, US-40, and US-73. At this point, which is on the border between Bonner Springs and Kansas City, an overlap with US-73 begins.

=== Bonner Springs to Nebraska ===
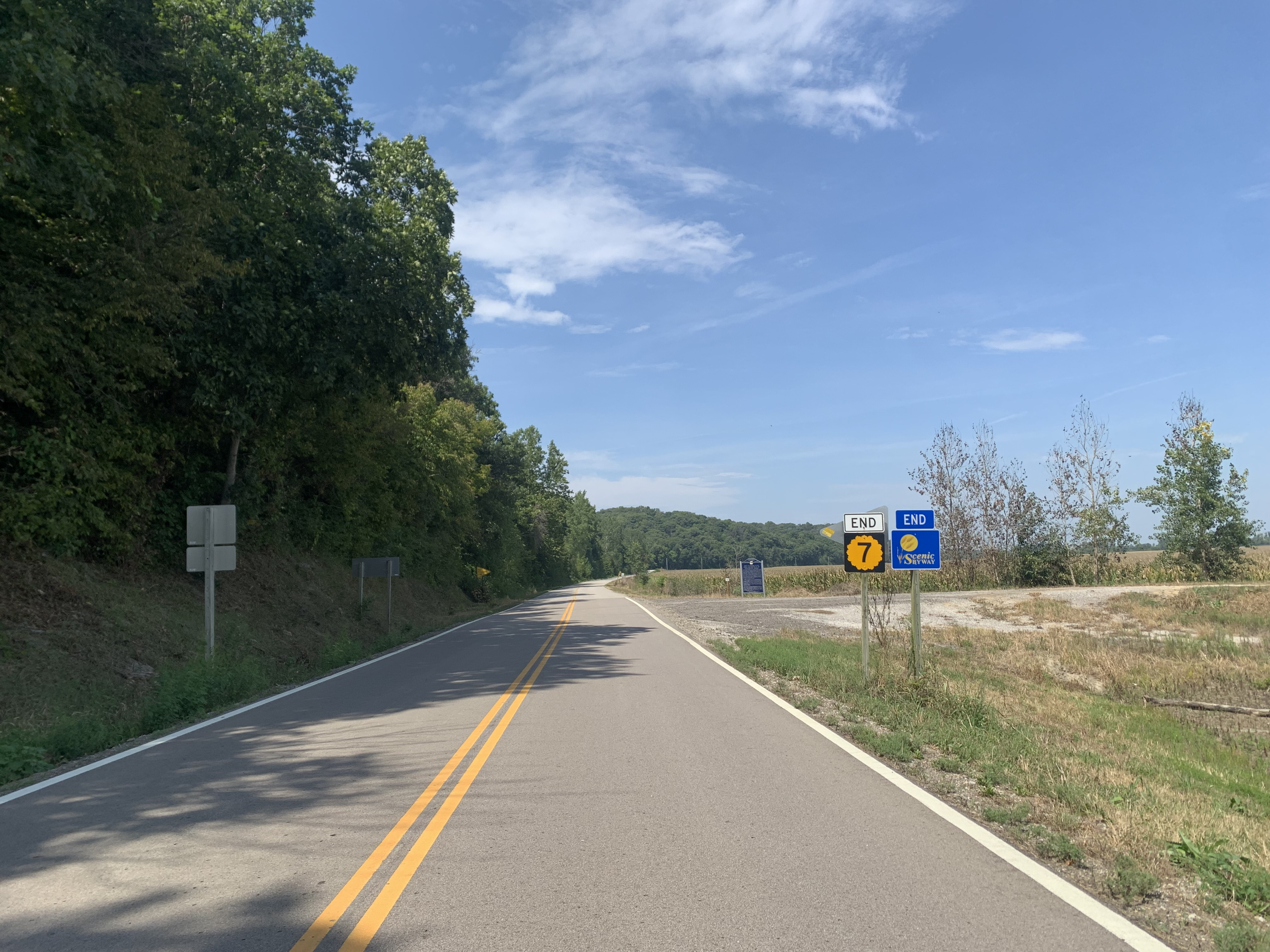
Northern terminus of Kansas Highway 7 at Nebraska border

K-7 and US-73 then go north along the western city limits of Kansas City before entering Lansing. They continue north through Lansing and upon entering Leavenworth, intersect K-5. Also in Leavenworth, they intersect K-92 and they briefly run concurrent with K-92 before separating and turning west to leave Leavenworth.K-7 and US-73 leave Leavenworth going west until intersecting K-192, then turn north, intersecting K-74 near Potter. At Atchison, K-7's overlap with US-73 ends at its intersection with US-59. After winding its way through Atchison, K-7 continues north and intersects K-20 near Bendena and US-36 west of Troy. The highway turns northwest along an alignment closely parallelling the Missouri River and after passing through White Cloud, ends at the Nebraska border northwest of White Cloud. No corresponding state highway in Nebraska continues from K-7, although a county road continues northwest to Rulo, Nebraska.

== History ==
=== Establishment ===
K-7 is one of the original State Highways that was designated in 1927, and at that time extended from the Oklahoma border to US-40 and US-73E west of Kansas City. Then between 1933 and 1934, K-7 had been extended north along the former K-16 to US-36 in Troy and US-73E was renumbered as US-73 and truncated to US-40 and US-24 west of Kansas City. Also by 1936, US-169 had been extended into Kansas and overlapped K-7 from slightly south of Osawatomie to Olathe. In an October 11, 1935 resolution, it was approved to extend K-7 further north from US-36 in Sparks to the Nebraska border. Then by 1937 the section from Sparks to the Nebraska border had been completed.

=== Realignments ===
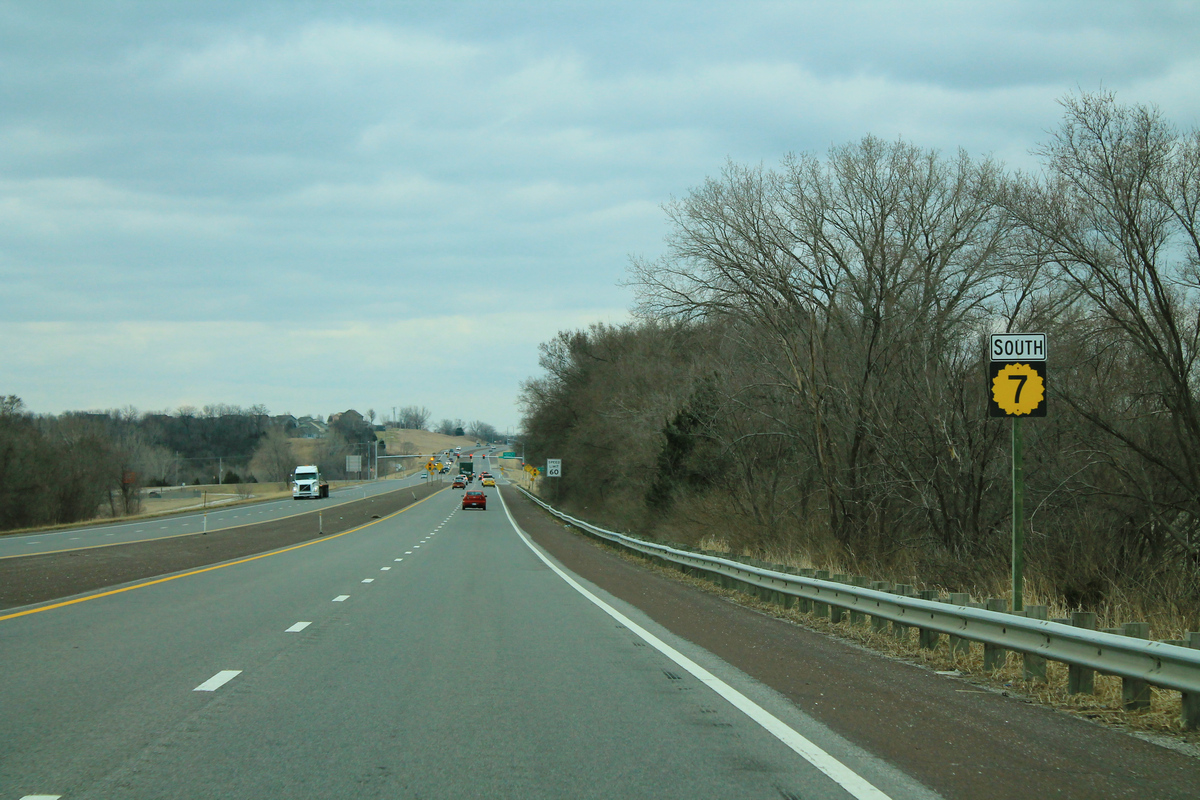
K-7 southbound sign

In a May 13, 1936 resolution, the northbound and southbound lanes were separated on K-7 to prevent traffic from crossing the northbound and southbound lanes of US-69, a few miles south of Fort Scott. In a November 6, 1936 resolution, K-7 was slightly realigned just south of Leavenworth to eliminate two turns. In a June 13, 1938 resolution K-7 and US-169 was slightly realigned by Hillsdale to eliminate two sharp curves. In a December 9, 1941 resolution a roughly 2.6 mile section of K-7 was slightly realigned north of Sparks. In a March 26, 1952 resolution K-7 was realigned slightly in Olathe. In a December 15, 1953 resolution K-7 and US-54 was realigned slightly north, northwest of Fort Scott. In an August 30, 1954 resolution K-7 and US-73 was realigned slightly just north of the Atchison-Leavenworth County line to eliminate two turns. In an October 19, 1955 resolution it was realigned slightly north of Farlinville to eliminate a sharp curve. In a November 14, 1956 resolution, K-7 was realigned slightly north of Bonner Springs to meet a new interchange built on US-24, US-40 and US-73. In a February 25, 1957 resolution a 4.5 mile section of K-7 was realigned slightly west, northeast of Olathe. In a December 10, 1957 resolution K-7 was realigned to the east of Bonner Springs. K-103 originally overlapped K-7 from K-103's current western terminus north to the current US-400 intersection, then continued west to US-160 south of McCune. Then in 1958 US-160 was realigned east along K-103 from K-103's original western terminus south of McCune to K-7 then continued east to US-69 and at that time K-103 was truncated to its current western terminus. Until 1959 in Troy, K-7 originally turned east onto Jones Street then turned north onto Park Street then east onto State Street then north onto Center Street then east onto Poplar Street then north onto Main Street to US-36. Then in a February 11, 1959 resolution the turn at Jones Street was eliminated and it was realigned to go straight north to US-36. In a February 14, 1968 resolution, a 6.15 mile section of K-7 and US-73 was moved west onto a new alignment south of Atchison. In a June 12, 1969 resolution K-7 and US-169 was realigned slightly eastward from slightly south of Paola to slightly south of Spring Hill. In a July 19, 1972 resolution K-7 was realigned slightly southeast onto a new alignment or US-169 southwest of Paola. In a September 19, 1980 resolution, K-7 and US-169 was realigned slightly to the west of Spring Hill. In a January 7, 1982 resolution K-31 was realigned slightly where it crosses the Little Osage River and at that time a section of K-7 north of the overlap with K-31 was moved slightly. In a December 16, 1983 resolution the overlap with K-10 was eliminated by Shawnee, K-10 eastward from K-7 was redesignated as K-12, and K-10 eastward from K-7 was redesignated as K-12. In an October 7, 1985 resolution, US-36 was realigned onto a new alignment from southwest of Highland to east of Troy and the old section of US-36 and K-7 from west of Troy to Sparks was redesignated solely as K-7. Until late 1996, K-39 overlapped K-7. Then in a November 18, 1996 resolution the overlap with K-39 was eliminated and K-39 was truncated to end at K-7. In a March 9, 1999 resolution US-73 and K-7 was realigned onto a new alignment from Leavenworth to Lowemont. In a March 10, 2003 resolution, a roughly 3.5 mile section of US-73 and K-7 was relocated slightly onto a new alignment. Until 2004, K-7 turned east and went through Troy where it crosses US-36. Then in a May 25, 2004 resolution the turn was eliminated and K-7 went straight north and crossed US-36 west of Troy. In a November 3, 2006 resolution K-7 was realigned, slightly south of Girard to eliminated two turns.

=== Improvements ===
The intersection of K-7 and 43rd Street in Shawnee is going to be reconstructed from August to November 2020. The improvements are to support the development of Heartland Logistics, a proposed industrial park on 150 acres at the northwest corner of 43rd and K-7. The improvements will include additional turn lanes, new detector loops, new traffic signals and grading.

== Major intersections ==
All exits are unnumbered.

County	Location	mi	km	Destinations	Notes
37th parallel north		0.000	0.000	US 69 south / Treece Road east / 10 Road west	Kansas–Oklahoma line; south end of concurrency with US-69; highway continues as US 69 south
Cherokee		2.234	3.595	US-166 – Baxter Springs, Chetopa	
Cherokee	Columbus	12.381	19.925	US-69 north / US-160 – Oswego, Pittsburg	North end of concurrency with US-69
Cherokee	Roseland–Scammon line	19.431	31.271	K-102 west (Roseland Boulevard) – West Mineral	Eastern terminus of K-102
Cherokee		21.451	34.522	K-103 east – Weir	Western terminus of K-103
Cherokee–Crawford county line	Cherokee	23.445	37.731	US-400 to US-69 – Parsons	
Crawford		28.429	45.752	K-126 – Pittsburg, McCune	
Crawford	Girard	35.600	57.293	K-47 (St. John Street) – Pittsburg, Chanute	
Bourbon		50.271	80.903	K-39 west – Chanute	Eastern terminus of K-39
Bourbon		58.220	93.696	US-69 south – Pittsburg	Modified trumpet interchange; south end of concurrency with US-69; no access to K-7 south from US-69 northbound
Bourbon	Fort Scott	63.043	101.458	US-54 east (Wall Street) – Fort Scott, Nevada Mo.	South end of freeway section; south end of concurrency with US-54; diamond interchange
Bourbon	Fort Scott	63.943	102.906	US-69 north – Kansas City	North end of freeway section; north end of concurrency with US-69; interchange
Bourbon		67.640	108.856	US-54 west – Iola	North end of concurrency with US-54
Bourbon		81.496	131.155	K-31 west – Mapleton	South end of concurrency with K-31
Bourbon		82.420	132.642	K-31 east – Fulton	North end of concurrency with K-31
Linn	Mound City	91.158	146.705	K-52 west – Kincaid, Jayhawk Linn High School	South end of concurrency with K-52
Linn	Mound City	91.392	147.081	K-52 east (Main Street) – Pleasanton	North end of concurrency with K-52
Linn		106.851	171.960	K-152 east (2100th Road) – La Cygne	Western terminus of K-152
Miami		118.717	191.056	US-169 south – Garnett	South end of expressway section; south end of concurrency with US-169; diamond interchange
Miami	Osawatomie	121.700	195.857	Main Street	Diamond interchange
Miami	Osawatomie	122.529	197.191	K-279 west (343rd Street)	Eastern terminus of K-279; diamond interchange
Miami		125.305	201.659	327th Street, Old KC Road	Partial cloverleaf interchange
Miami	Paola	127.892	205.822	Baptiste Drive	Diamond interchange
Miami		132.343	212.985	K-68 – Ottawa, Louisburg	Diamond interchange
Miami	Hillsdale	135.358	217.838	255th Street	Diamond interchange
Miami	Spring Hill	139.420	224.375	223rd Street – Spring Hill, Bucyrus	North end of expressway section; diamond interchange
Johnson	Olathe	148.927	239.675	I-35 / US-169 north / US-50 / US-56 / 151st Street – Wichita, Kansas City, Executive Airport	I-35 exit 215; three-level interchange with two-way ramps between K-7 and 151st St.; north end of concurrency with US-169; 151st St. serves Olathe Medical Center
Johnson	Olathe	154.100	248.000	119th Street	South end of freeway section; diamond interchange
Johnson	Olathe	155.158	249.703	College Boulevard	Diamond interchange
Johnson	Olathe	156.161	251.317	K-10 – Lawrence, Lenexa	Cloverleaf interchange
Johnson	Lenexa	157.132	252.879	Prairie Star Boulevard	Diamond interchange
Johnson	Shawnee	158.697	255.398	83rd Street	Diamond interchange
Johnson	Shawnee	160.915	258.968	Shawnee Mission Parkway / 67th Street	Cloverleaf interchange
Johnson	Shawnee	162.253	261.121	Johnson Drive / 55th Street	Roundabout interchange; north end of freeway section
Kansas River		164.407– 164.831	264.587– 265.270	K-7 Bridge	
Wyandotte	Bonner Springs	164.773	265.176	K-32 (Kaw Drive) / Front Street	South end of freeway section; folded diamond interchange
Wyandotte	Bonner Springs	165.798	266.826	Nettleton Avenue	North end of freeway section; diamond interchange
Wyandotte	Bonner Springs	166.637– 167.322	268.176– 269.279	I-70 / Kansas Turnpike / US-24 east / US-40 east / US-73 begin – St. Louis, Topeka	Kansas Tpke. exit 224A; southern terminus of US-73; south end of concurrencies with US-24, US-40, and US-73; interchange
Wyandotte	Kansas City	168.906	271.828	US-24 west / US-40 west (State Avenue)	Partial cloverleaf interchange; north end of concurrencies with US-24 and US-40
Leavenworth	Leavenworth	179.952	289.605	K-5 south – Leavenworth National Cemetery	Northern terminus of K-5
Leavenworth	Leavenworth	182.610	293.882	K-92 west (Spruce Street) – McLouth	Southern end of K-92 overlap
Leavenworth	Leavenworth	183.847	295.873	K-92 east – Platte City Mo.	Northern end of K-92 overlap
Leavenworth	Leavenworth	185.506	298.543	CR 14 (Santa Fe Trail) / N. 20th Street	Partial cloverleaf interchange
Leavenworth	Kickapoo Township	192.203	309.321	K-192 west – Easton	Eastern terminus of K-192
Atchison	Atchison	207.372	333.733	US-73 north / US-59 – Hiawatha, St. Joseph Mo., Jackson Park	North end of concurrency with US-73
Doniphan		218.324	351.358	K-20 west – Denton	Eastern terminus of K-20
Doniphan		222.346	357.831	US-36 – Troy, Wathena, Hiawatha	Diamond interchange
Doniphan	Iowa Reservation	240.606	387.218	703 Trail north – Rulo	Continuation into Nebraska
1.000 mi = 1.609 km; 1.000 km = 0.621 mi: Concurrency terminus

== See also ==
- List of state highways in Kansas
