= Cherokee Township, Kansas =

Cherokee Township, Kansas may refer to:

- Cherokee Township, Cherokee County, Kansas
- Cherokee Township, Montgomery County, Kansas, Montgomery County, Kansas

== See also ==
- List of Kansas townships
- Cherokee Township (disambiguation)
