= Ross Township, Illinois =

Ross Township, Illinois may refer to one of the following townships:

- Ross Township, Edgar County, Illinois
- Ross Township, Pike County, Illinois
- Ross Township, Vermilion County, Illinois

See also

- Ross Township (disambiguation)
