= Mineral Township, Kansas =

Mineral Township
- Township
- Location in Cherokee County
- Coordinates: 37°16′00″N 094°46′31″W
- Country: United States
- State: Kansas
- County: Cherokee

Area
  - Total: 30.65 sq mi (79.38 km^{2})
  - Land: 30.60 sq mi (79.26 km^{2})
  - Water: 0.046 sq mi (0.12 km^{2}) 0.15%
- Elevation: 922 ft (281 m)

Population (2020)
  - Total: 203
  - Density: 6.63/sq mi (2.56/km^{2})
- GNIS feature ID: 0469331

Mineral Township is a township in Cherokee County, Kansas, United States. As of the 2020 census, its population was 203.

== Geography ==
Mineral Township covers an area of 30.65 square miles (79.4 km^{2}). The community of Scammon sits on it western border with Ross Township. According to the USGS, it contains three cemeteries: Hosey Hill, Lone Elm and Saint Bridget.
