= Neosho Township, Cherokee County, Kansas =

Neosho Township
- Township
- Location in Cherokee County
- Coordinates: 37°03′36″N 095°01′58″W
- Country: United States
- State: Kansas
- County: Cherokee

Area
  - Total: 61.2 sq mi (158.6 km^{2})
  - Land: 60.58 sq mi (156.89 km^{2})
  - Water: 0.66 sq mi (1.71 km^{2}) 1.08%
- Elevation: 797 ft (243 m)

Population (2020)
  - Total: 225
  - Density: 3.71/sq mi (1.43/km^{2})
- GNIS feature ID: 0469567

Neosho Township is a township in Cherokee County, Kansas, United States. As of the 2020 census, its population was 225.

== Geography ==
Neosho Township covers an area of 61.24 square miles (158.6 km^{2}) and contains two unincorporated settlements, Faulkner, and Melrose. According to the USGS, it contains two cemeteries: Fairview and Fly Creek.

Big Candy Lake, Boone Lake, Hines Lake, Hubbell Lake, Little Candy Lake and Marvin Lake are within this township. The streams of Center Creek, Cherry Creek, Little Fly Creek and Short Creek run through this township. The Neosho River runs through this township.
