= Ross Township, Indiana =

Ross Township, Indiana may refer to one of the following places:

- Ross Township, Clinton County, Indiana
- Ross Township, Lake County, Indiana

== See also ==
- Ross Township (disambiguation)
