= K104 =

K104 or K-104 may refer to:

- KJLO, an FM radio station in Monroe, Louisiana
- WSPK, an FM radio station of the Hudson Valley
- KKDA-FM, a radio station of the Dallas-Fort Worth Metroplex
- K-104 (Kansas highway)
