= Ross Township, Ohio =

Ross Township, Ohio may refer to:

- Ross Township, Butler County, Ohio
- Ross Township, Greene County, Ohio
- Ross Township, Jefferson County, Ohio
- Ross Township, Wood County, Ohio (defunct)

== See also ==
- Ross Township (disambiguation)
