= KS 7 =

KS 7 may refer to:

- Kansas's 7th congressional district
- K-7 (Kansas highway)
