= Lola Township, Kansas =

Lola Township
- Township
- Location in Cherokee County
- Coordinates: 37°09′30″N 095°01′55″W
- Country: United States
- State: Kansas
- County: Cherokee

Area
  - Total: 44.72 sq mi (115.82 km^{2})
  - Land: 44.49 sq mi (115.24 km^{2})
  - Water: 0.22 sq mi (0.58 km^{2}) 0.5%
- Elevation: 830 ft (253 m)

Population (2020)
  - Total: 288
  - Density: 6.47/sq mi (2.50/km^{2})
- GNIS feature ID: 0469277

Lola Township is a township in Cherokee County, Kansas, United States. As of the 2020 census, its population was 288.

== Geography ==
Lola Township covers an area of 44.72 square miles (115.8 km^{2}) and contains no incorporated settlements. According to the USGS, it contains four cemeteries: Cherokee, Dove, Garrison and Spickelmire.

The streams of Deer Creek, Denny Branch, Fly Creek, Fourmile Creek, Lightning Creek and Wolf Creek run through this township.

== Transportation ==
Lola Township contains one airport or landing strip, Oswego Municipal Airport.
