= Salamanca Township, Kansas =

Salamanca Township
- Township
- Location in Cherokee County
- Coordinates: 37°09′33″N 094°54′10″W
- Country: United States
- State: Kansas
- County: Cherokee

Area
  - Total: 34.42 sq mi (89.14 km^{2})
  - Land: 34.39 sq mi (89.08 km^{2})
  - Water: 0.023 sq mi (0.06 km^{2}) 0.07%
- Elevation: 906 ft (276 m)

Population (2020)
  - Total: 493
  - Density: 14.3/sq mi (5.53/km^{2})
- GNIS feature ID: 0469271

Salamanca Township is a township in Cherokee County, Kansas, United States. As of the 2020 census, its population was 493.

== Geography ==
Salamanca Township covers an area of 34.42 square miles (89.1 km^{2}) and contains the county seat of Columbus.
