= Sherwin, Kansas =

Unincorporated community in Cherokee County, Kansas, United States

- Unincorporated community
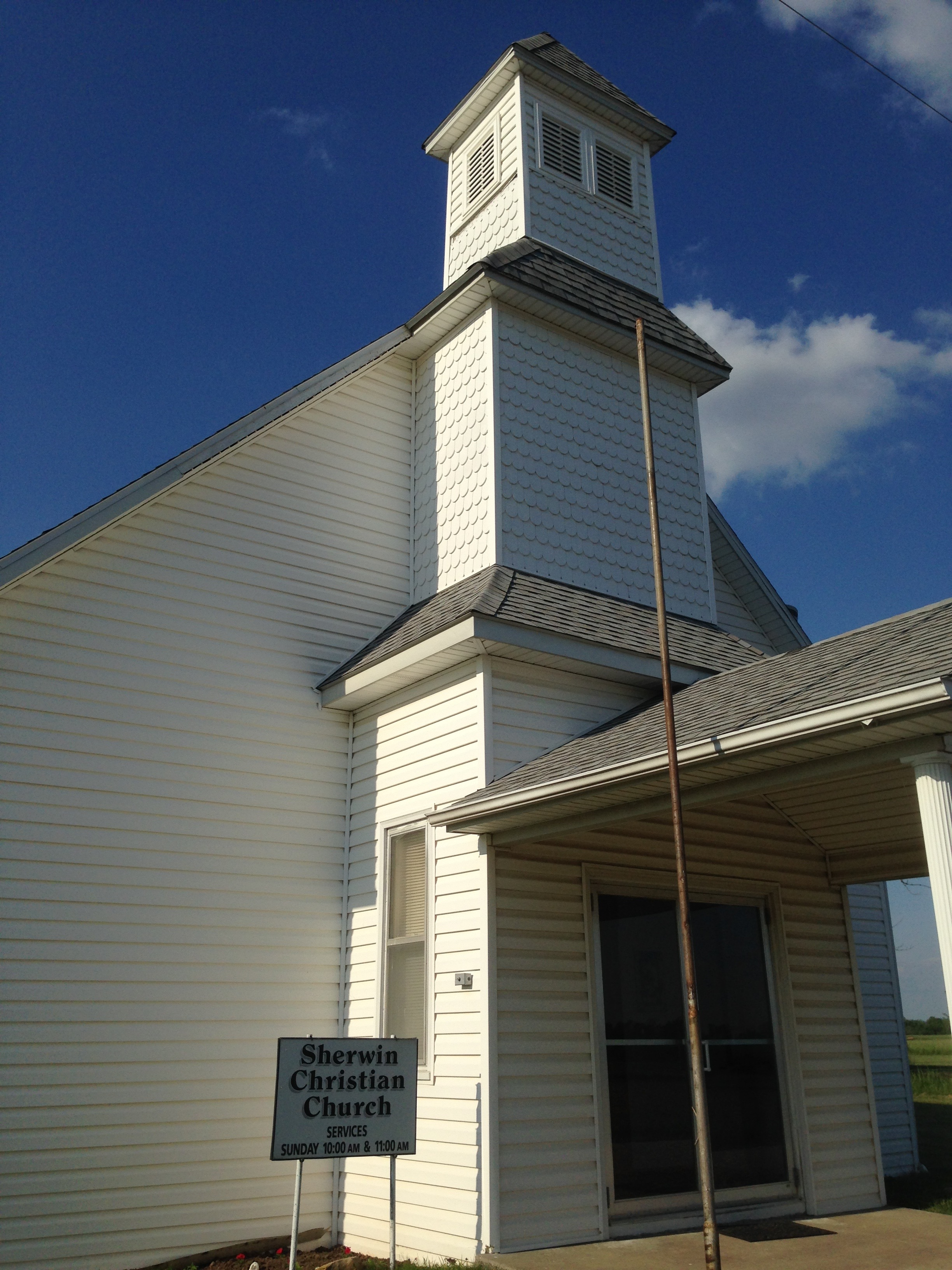
- Sherwin Christian Church

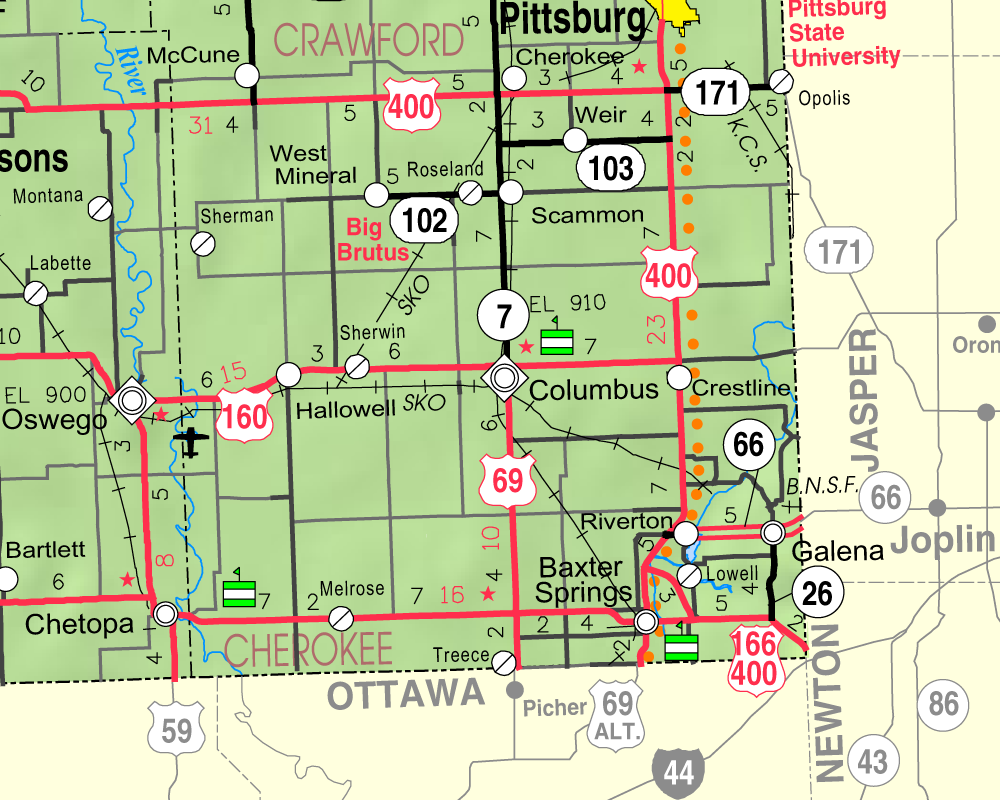
- KDOT map of Cherokee County (legend)

- Location within Kansas Location within the United States
- Country: United States
- State: Kansas
- County: Cherokee
- Elevation: 860 ft (260 m)
- Time zone: UTC-6 (CST)
  - Summer (DST): UTC-5 (CDT)
- Area code: 620
- FIPS code: 20-65200
- GNIS ID: 484447

Sherwin is an unincorporated community in Cherokee County, Kansas, United States.

== History ==
Sherwin had a post office from 1886 until 1953. The post office was also called Sherwin City and Sherwin Junction for some time.
