= David Mackie =

President of the Scammon State Bank
- In office 1901–1910

David Charles Mackie (January 1, 1836 – August 9, 1910) was a founder and builder of Scammon, Kansas. He was the first President of the Scammon State Bank.

== Early years ==
Mackie was born near Kilbirnie, North Ayrshire, Scotland. His parents, David and Janet (Barclay) Mackie, lived and died in Ayrshire. Mackie's school days were limited, but he was especially capable in mathematics. At the age of 9, he became a trapper in a coal mine in Scotland.

== Career ==
At the age of 25, Mackie was superintending engineer for the Barkip Coal & Ironstone Works in Scotland. He resigned from this position and in 1869 moved to the United States with his wife, proceeding to Hartland, Wisconsin, where his wife's uncle lived. The uncle was a farmer, and for a while Mackie engaged in farming, but that occupation didn't suit him. Through the influence of his brother, William, Mackie got a job as a machinist with the Chicago, Milwaukee & St. Paul railroad for a short time.

In 1871, Mackie accepted a position with the coal mining firm of Bennett & Turner, for whom he installed machinery in mines near Braidwood, Illinois. He then became mine foreman, and later superintendent. Here he remained until 1883, when he moved to Kansas to accept a position with the Keith & Perry Coal Company, with whom, and their successors, he remained many years, as superintendent of mines. In 1892, Mackie accepted the position of general superintendent of the mines of the Central Coal & Coke Company, which firm succeeded the Keith & Perry Coal Company, and which also absorbed the business of the Kansas & Texas Coal Company, embracing coal mines in Missouri, Kansas, Arkansas, Oklahoma, and Wyoming. He held this position until 1906, when he retired from active business, his resignation accepted on the condition that he remain the consulting engineer of the company, to which he agreed.

In 1883, Mackie established a home in Scammon, being a founder and builder of the town. He aided in organizing the Scammon State Bank in 1901, and he became the first president of the bank, holding the position until his death.

== Personal life ==
In 1860, Mackie married Elizabeth Kerr, a daughter of Thomas and Jane (Pringle) Kerr, of Dalry, North Ayrshire, Scotland. They had several children: David, Thomas, Janet, George, Jane, and John. Mackie was a 32° Scottish Rite Mason. A member of the Presbyterian church, he was an organizer of the Presbyterian church at Scammon, of which he was a trustee. He died at Scammon.
