= K-104 (Kansas highway) =

State highway in Kansas, U.S.

K-104
- K-104 highlighted in red

Route information
- Maintained by KDOT
- Length: 2.275 mi (3.661 km)
- Existed: 1967–present

Major junctions
- West end: I-135 / US-81 near Mentor
- East end: K-4 north of Assaria

Location
- Country: United States
- State: Kansas
- Counties: Saline

Highway system
- Kansas State Highway System; Interstate; US; State; Spurs
← K-103	→ K-105

K-104 is a 2.275-mile-long (3.661 km) state highway in Saline County in the U.S. State of Kansas. It is signed east–west even though the majority of the route runs north–south. The route begins at a junction with Interstate 135 (I-135) and U.S. Route 81 (US-81), at I-135 exit 86, to a junction with K-4. It has an annual average daily traffic of between 1000 and 1300 and is paved with composite pavement. The highway is not a part of the National Highway System. The route was established around 1967, and has not been changed since.

== Route description ==
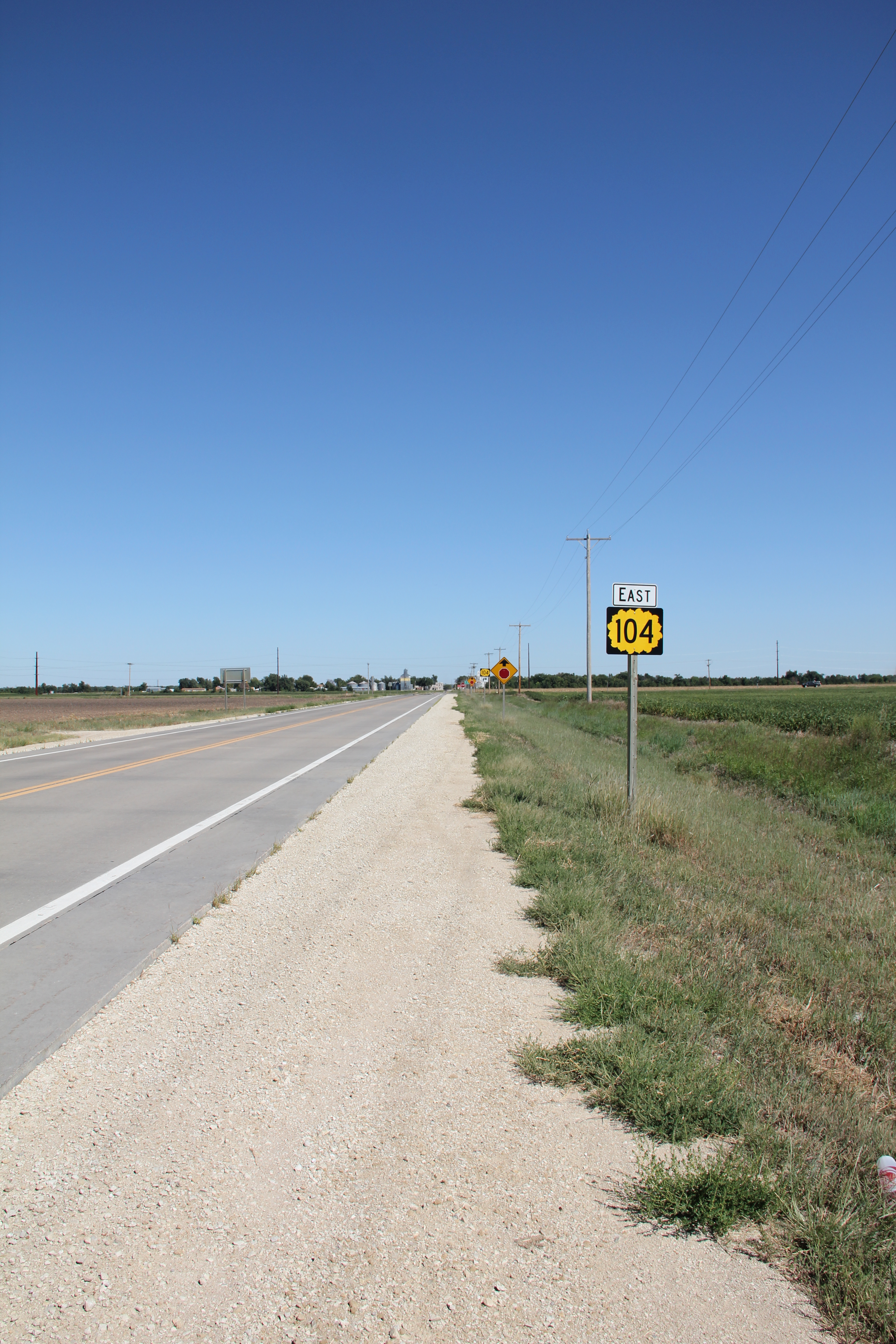
The east-west portion of the highway seen from just east of the junction with Interstate 135 looking towards the town of Mentor

The route begins at a diamond interchange with I-135 and US-81. After traveling east for approximately 0.3 miles (480 m), it turns south just west of Mentor. From there, it closely parallels the Interstate through about 2 miles (3.2 km) of rural farmland before the route ends at a junction with K-4 near I-135/US-81. The route has a total distance of 2.3 miles (3.7 km), all of it in Saline County.

The highway has an annual average daily traffic (the total volume of vehicle traffic of a highway for a year divided by 365 days) of 1,260 over the first 1 mile (1.6 km) of the route, and an AADT of 1,069 for the last 1.3 miles (2.1 km) of the route. The entire route is paved with composite pavement. K-104 is not a part of the National Highway System.

== History ==
The route was established in 1967 with its current routing in Saline County, with Interstate 135 signed as I-35W. The routing has not been changed. Also, note that K-152 was K-135 at the time.

=== Original K-104 ===
The original K-104 was designated in 1940 from Pittsburg to Missouri. In 1942, it was proposed to be extended west to a rerouted US 160, which was to be rerouted on a route further south. In 1943, US 160 was not moved to the proposed road, but kept its then-current routing. The part of the proposed road from K-7 to US 69 was designated as a new K-104. The old K-104 was renumbered K-126 to match Missouri. The road from K-7 to US 160 became an extension of K-103. In 1958, K-104 and the extension of K-103 became part of a rerouted US 160, as was planned in 1942. The old route of US 160 became an extension of K-126.

== Major intersections ==
The entire route is in Smolan Township, Saline County.

mi	km	Destinations	Notes
0.000	0.000	I-135 / US-81 – Wichita, Salina	Western terminus; I-135 exit 86; diamond interchange; road continues as Smolan Road
2.275	3.661	K-4 – Lindsborg, Herington	Eastern terminus; road continues as K-4 west (Old Highway 81)
1.000 mi = 1.609 km; 1.000 km = 0.621 mi
