= Lowell Township, Kansas =

Lowell Township
- Township
- Location in Cherokee County
- Coordinates: 37°06′15″N 094°40′01″W
- Country: United States
- State: Kansas
- County: Cherokee

Area
  - Total: 13.30 sq mi (34.44 km^{2})
  - Land: 12.9 sq mi (33.4 km^{2})
  - Water: 0.41 sq mi (1.05 km^{2}) 3.05%
- Elevation: 814 ft (248 m)

Population (2020)
  - Total: 663
  - Density: 50/sq mi (19.3/km^{2})
- GNIS feature ID: 0469357

Lowell Township is a township in Cherokee County, Kansas, United States. As of the 2020 census, its population was 663, down from 675 in 2010.

== Geography ==
Lowell Township covers an area of 13.3 square miles (34 km^{2}) to the north and west of Galena. According to the USGS, it contains three cemeteries: Boston Mills, Hillcrest, and Stevenson.

The streams of Shawnee Creek, Short Creek, and Spring Branch run through this township.
