= Stippville, Kansas =

Unincorporated community in Cherokee County, Kansas

Coordinates: 37°13′20″N 94°50′16″W

Stippville is an unincorporated community in Cherokee County, Kansas, United States. It is located four miles north of Columbus.

== History ==
Cherokee County opened for settlement in 1866. Coal was found at numerous places across the county and soon, it became the leading coal producing county for the state of Kansas for many years. The Columbus Coal Company had a shaft located at Stippville, on the Kansas City, Fort Scott & Memphis railway. Stippville was a mining town that was developed in the late nineteenth-century. The town had a population of 200 by 1910. The original post office moved from Newcastle to Stippville in the 1880s.
