= Shawnee Township, Kansas =

Shawnee Township
- Township
- Location in Cherokee County
- Coordinates: 37°09′50″N 094°40′01″W
- Country: United States
- State: Kansas
- County: Cherokee

Area
  - Total: 35.0 sq mi (90.7 km^{2})
  - Land: 34.81 sq mi (90.15 km^{2})
  - Water: 0.21 sq mi (0.55 km^{2}) 0.61%
- Elevation: 873 ft (266 m)

Population (2020)
  - Total: 545
  - Density: 15.7/sq mi (6.05/km^{2})
- GNIS feature ID: 0469356

Shawnee Township is a township in Cherokee County, Kansas, United States. As of the 2020 census, its population was 545.

== Geography ==
Shawnee Township covers an area of 35.02 square miles (90.7 km^{2}) and contains no incorporated settlements. According to the USGS, it contains three cemeteries: Messer, Ritchie and Wirtonia.

The streams of Cow Creek, Little Shawnee Creek and Turkey Creek run through this township.
