= Carona, Kansas =

Unincorporated community in Cherokee County, Kansas

- Unincorporated community
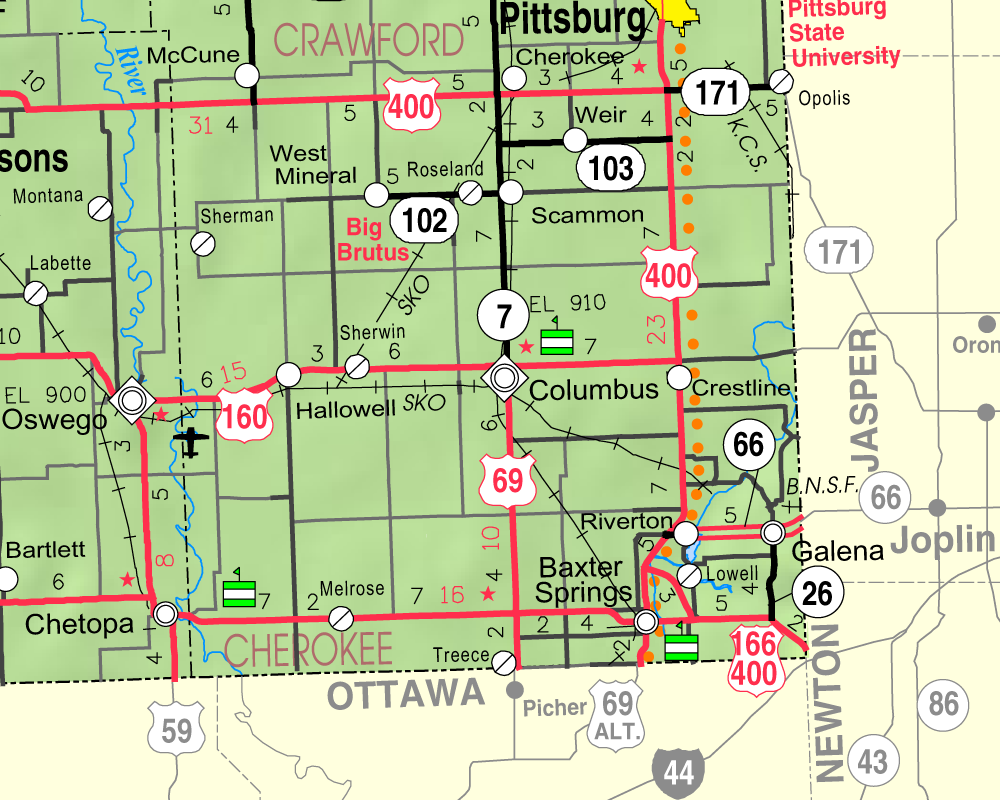
- KDOT map of Cherokee County (legend)

- Location within Kansas Location within the United States
- Coordinates: 37°16′49″N 94°52′07″W
- Country: United States
- State: Kansas
- County: Cherokee
- Elevation: 912 ft (278 m)
- Time zone: UTC-6 (CST)
  - Summer (DST): UTC-5 (CDT)
- Area code: 620
- FIPS code: 20-10825
- GNIS ID: 482751

Carona is an unincorporated community in Cherokee County, Kansas, United States.

== History ==
Carona was originally called Carbona, because the area was rich with coal and coal is a carbon-based fuel.

A post office was opened in Carona in 1905, and remained in operation until it was discontinued in 1988.

== Area attractions ==
Carona is the home of the Heart of the Heartlands museum complex dedicated to preserving the history railroads had in the mining industry. The complex includes a railroad museum; a restored Missouri Pacific Depot from Carona; a restored Missouri Pacific Depot from Boston, Missouri; and, a collection of railroad locomotives and cars, including the cosmetically restored KCS Steam Locomotive #1023 that once was displayed at Schlanger Park in Pittsburg, Kansas.
