= Keelville, Kansas =

Unincorporated community in Cherokee County, Kansas

Coordinates: 37°01′52″N 94°55′22″W

Keelville is an unincorporated community in Cherokee County, Kansas, United States.

== History ==
A post office was established in Keelville in 1868, and remained in operation until it was discontinued in 1905.
