= Lyon Township, Cherokee County, Kansas =

Lyon Township
- Township
- Location in Cherokee County
- Coordinates: 37°03′34″N 094°54′15″W
- Country: United States
- State: Kansas
- County: Cherokee

Area
  - Total: 50.14 sq mi (129.87 km^{2})
  - Land: 50.10 sq mi (129.76 km^{2})
  - Water: 0.042 sq mi (0.11 km^{2}) 0.08%
- Elevation: 879 ft (268 m)

Population (2020)
  - Total: 328
  - Density: 6.55/sq mi (2.53/km^{2})
- GNIS feature ID: 0469272

Lyon Township is a township in Cherokee County, Kansas, United States. As of the 2020 census, its population was 328.

== Geography ==
Lyon Township covers an area of 50.14 square miles (129.9 km^{2}) and contains one Ghost Town, Treece. According to the USGS, it contains four cemeteries: Greenlawn, Johnson Family, Moore and Mound.
