= Lawton, Kansas =

Unincorporated community in Cherokee County, Kansas

Lawton is an unincorporated community in Cherokee County, Kansas, United States, and located at 37°13′19″N 94°38′10″W.

== History ==
Lawton once had a post office; it was discontinued in 1986.
