= Neutral, Kansas =

Unincorporated community in Cherokee County, Kansas

Coordinates: 37°05′52″N 94°47′42″W

Neutral is an unincorporated community in Cherokee County, Kansas, United States. It is located approximately five miles northwest of Baxter Springs along the St. Louis and San Francisco Railway. Brush Creek flows past the northeastern side of the community and into the Spring River near Riverton, five miles to the east.

== History ==
Neutral once had a post office; it was discontinued in 1907.
