= Cokedale, Kansas =

Unincorporated community in Cherokee County, Kansas

Cokedale is an unincorporated community in Cherokee County, Kansas, United States. Cokedale is located at 37°14′48″N 94°53′34″W.

== History ==
A post office was opened in Cokedale in 1899, and remained in operation until it was discontinued in 1906.
