= Melrose, Kansas =

Unincorporated community in Cherokee County, Kansas

Coordinates: 37°01′51″N 94°57′30″W

Melrose is an unincorporated community in Neosho Township of Cherokee County, Kansas, United States, and has an elevation of 889 feet (271 m). It contains one church, the Melrose United Methodist Church.

== History ==
A post office was opened in Melrose in 1877, and remained in operation until it was discontinued in 1905.
