= Sheridan Township, Cherokee County, Kansas =

Sheridan Township
- Township
- Location in Cherokee County
- Coordinates: 37°16′00″N 095°01′01″W
- Country: United States
- State: Kansas
- County: Cherokee

Area
  - Total: 67.07 sq mi (173.72 km^{2})
  - Land: 66.54 sq mi (172.35 km^{2})
  - Water: 0.53 sq mi (1.37 km^{2}) 0.79%
- Elevation: 840 ft (256 m)

Population (2020)
  - Total: 201
  - Density: 3.02/sq mi (1.17/km^{2})
- GNIS feature ID: 0469476

Sheridan Township is a township in Cherokee County, Kansas, United States. As of the 2020 census, its population was 201.

== Geography ==
Sheridan Township covers an area of 67.07 square miles (173.7 km^{2}) and contains no incorporated settlements.

According to the United States Geological Survey (USGS), it contains eight cemeteries: Bowen, Friendship, Harley, LaRue, McKee, Rigney, Sherman, Star.

The streams of Little Cherry Creek, Mulberry Creek, Plum Creek and Stink Branch all run through the township.
