= Garden Township, Cherokee County, Kansas =

Garden Township
- Township
- Location in Cherokee County
- Coordinates: 37°02′00″N 094°40′01″W
- Country: United States
- State: Kansas
- County: Cherokee

Area
  - Total: 29.79 sq mi (77.15 km^{2})
  - Land: 28.95 sq mi (74.98 km^{2})
  - Water: 0.83 sq mi (2.16 km^{2}) 2.8%
- Elevation: 920 ft (280 m)

Population (2020)
  - Total: 2,731
  - Density: 94.34/sq mi (36.42/km^{2})
- GNIS feature ID: 0469361

Garden Township is a township in Cherokee County, Kansas, United States. As of the 2020 census, its population was 2,731.

== Geography ==
Garden Township covers an area of 29.79 square miles (77.2 km^{2}) and contains no incorporated settlements. According to the USGS, it contains five cemeteries: Faith Community Church, Gandy, Lowell, Pence and Quaker Valley.

The stream of Shoal Creek runs through this township.
