= Spring Valley Township, Cherokee County, Kansas =

Spring Valley Township
- Township
- Location in Cherokee County
- Coordinates: 37°03′30″N 094°46′51″W
- Country: United States
- State: Kansas
- County: Cherokee

Area
  - Total: 47.20 sq mi (122.25 km^{2})
  - Land: 47.03 sq mi (121.82 km^{2})
  - Water: 0.17 sq mi (0.44 km^{2}) 0.36%
- Elevation: 850 ft (260 m)

Population (2020)
  - Total: 1,028
  - Density: 21.86/sq mi (8.439/km^{2})
- GNIS feature ID: 0469373

Spring Valley Township is a township in Cherokee County, Kansas, United States. As of the 2020 census, its population was 1,028.

== Geography ==
Spring Valley Township covers an area of 47.2 square miles (122 km^{2}) and contains one incorporated settlement, Baxter Springs. According to the USGS, it contains seven cemeteries: Baxter Springs, Beasley, Brush Creek, Crum, Dockery, Pleasant View and Usrey.

The streams of Bitter Creek, Brush Creek and Willow Creek run through this township.

== Transportation ==
Spring Valley Township contains one airport or landing strip, named the Walter A. Swalley Airpark.
