= Turck, Kansas =

Unincorporated community in Cherokee County, Kansas

- Unincorporated community
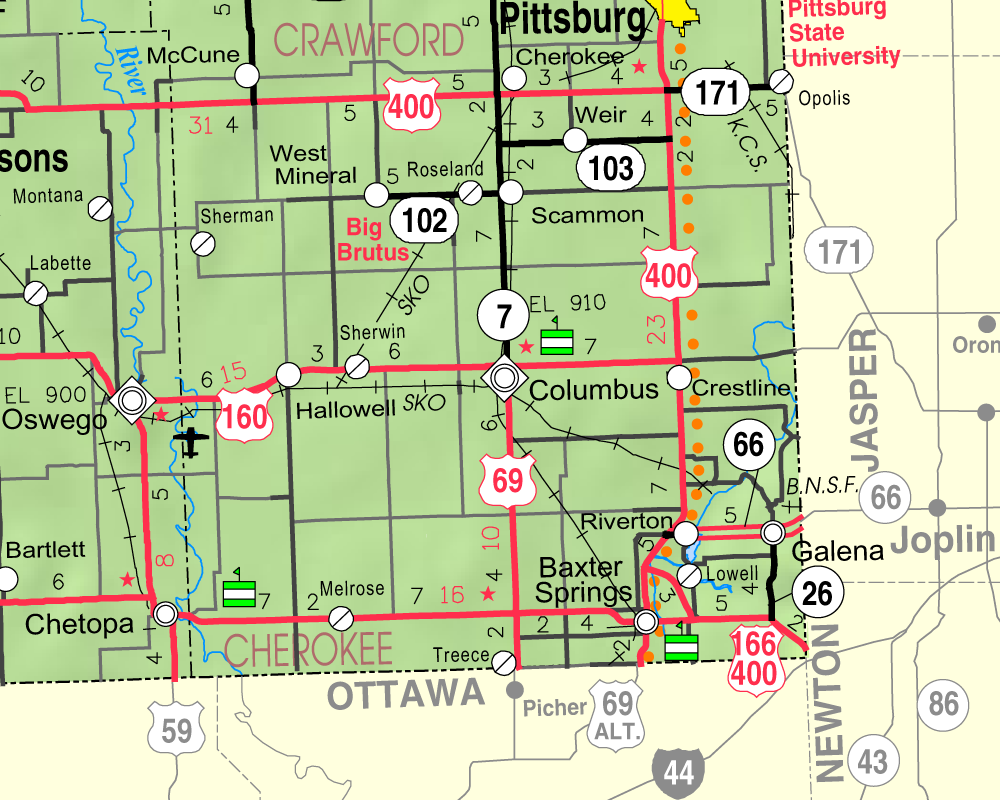
- KDOT map of Cherokee County (legend)

- Location within Kansas Location within the United States
- Coordinates: 37°13′50″N 94°49′55″W
- Country: United States
- State: Kansas
- County: Cherokee
- Elevation: 932 ft (284 m)
- Time zone: UTC-6 (CST)
  - Summer (DST): UTC-5 (CDT)
- Area code: 620
- FIPS code: 20-71650
- GNIS ID: 484451

Turck is an unincorporated community in Cherokee County, Kansas, United States. Its elevation is 932 feet.

== History ==
Turck had a post office from 1889 until 1891.
