= Cherokee Township =

Cherokee Township may refer to:

- Cherokee Township, in Sharp County, Arkansas
- Cherokee Township, Cherokee County, Iowa
- Cherokee Township, Cherokee County, Kansas
- Cherokee Township, Montgomery County, Kansas, in Montgomery County, Kansas
- Cherokee Township, Payne County, Oklahoma, defunct; see List of Oklahoma townships
- Cherokee Township, Wagoner County, Oklahoma, defunct; see List of Oklahoma townships
