= Empire City, Kansas =

Unincorporated community in Cherokee County, Kansas

Empire City is an unincorporated community in Cherokee County, Kansas, United States, and located at 37°05′21″N 94°38′31″W.

== History ==
Empire City once had a post office; it was discontinued in 1913.
