= K-7 Bridge =

- Coordinates: 39.0593°N 94.8715°W
- Carries: 4 lanes of K-7
- Crosses: Kansas River
- Locale: Bonner Springs, Kansas and Shawnee, Kansas
- Maintained by: KDOT

Characteristics
- Design: Girder

History
- Opened: 1960s

The K-7 Bridge is an automobile crossing of the Kansas River on the border of Shawnee and Bonner Springs. It was built around 1960 and carries four lanes of Kansas State Highway K-7.

The bridge is located 0.6 miles (0.97 km) east of Bonner Springs.
