= Roseland, Kansas =

City in Cherokee County, Kansas

- City
- Location within Cherokee County and Kansas

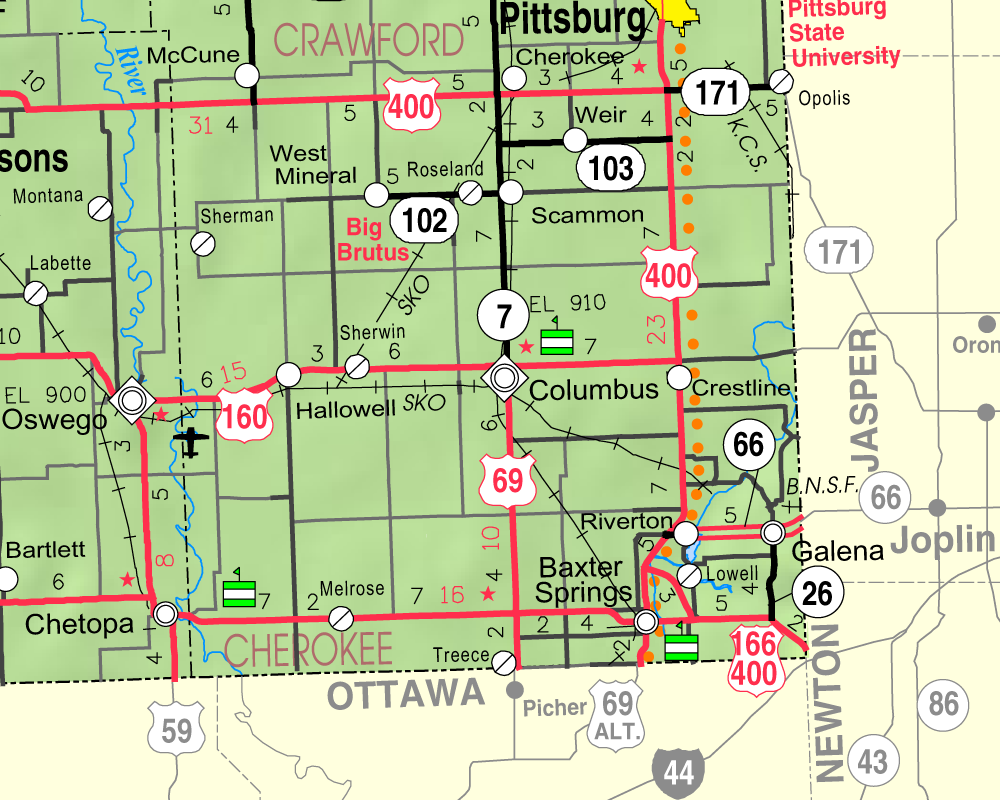
- KDOT map of Cherokee County (legend)
- Coordinates: 37°16′50″N 94°50′38″W
- Country: United States
- State: Kansas
- County: Cherokee
- Incorporated: 1906

Area
  - Total: 0.73 sq mi (1.89 km^{2})
  - Land: 0.73 sq mi (1.89 km^{2})
  - Water: 0 sq mi (0.00 km^{2})
- Elevation: 915 ft (279 m)

Population (2020)
  - Total: 76
  - Density: 100/sq mi (40/km^{2})
- Time zone: UTC-6 (CST)
  - Summer (DST): UTC-5 (CDT)
- ZIP Code: 66773
- Area code: 620
- FIPS code: 20-61275
- GNIS ID: 2396432

Roseland is a city in Cherokee County, Kansas, United States. As of the 2020 census, the population of the city was 76.

== Geography ==
According to the United States Census Bureau, the city has a total area of 0.80 square miles (2.07 km^{2}), all land.

Roseland is on K-102, west of its junction with K-7.

== Demographics ==
Historical population
Census	Pop.	Note	%±
1910	396		—
1920	482		21.7%
1930	190		−60.6%
1940	173		−8.9%
1950	182		5.2%
1960	133		−26.9%
1970	113		−15.0%
1980	119		5.3%
1990	98		−17.6%
2000	101		3.1%
2010	77		−23.8%
2020	76		−1.3%
U.S. Decennial Census

=== 2010 census ===
As of the census of 2010, there were 77 people, 37 households, and 21 families residing in the city. The population density was 96.3 inhabitants per square mile (37.2/km^{2}). There were 48 housing units at an average density of 60.0 per square mile (23.2/km^{2}). The racial makeup of the city was 97.4% White and 2.6% Native American.

There were 37 households, of which 32.4% had children under the age of 18 living with them, 32.4% were married couples living together, 16.2% had a female householder with no husband present, 8.1% had a male householder with no wife present, and 43.2% were non-families. 32.4% of all households were made up of individuals, and 18.9% had someone living alone who was 65 years of age or older. The average household size was 2.08 and the average family size was 2.52.

The median age in the city was 41.8 years. 19.5% of residents were under the age of 18; 7.8% were between the ages of 18 and 24; 27.3% were from 25 to 44; 28.6% were from 45 to 64; and 16.9% were 65 years of age or older. The gender makeup of the city was 42.9% male and 57.1% female.

=== 2000 census ===
As of the census of 2000, there were 101 people, 39 households, and 28 families residing in the city. The population density was 125.9 inhabitants per square mile (48.6/km^{2}). There were 49 housing units at an average density of 61.1 per square mile (23.6/km^{2}). The racial makeup of the city was 96.04% White, and 3.96% from two or more races.

There were 39 households, out of which 30.8% had children under the age of 18 living with them, 51.3% were married couples living together, 10.3% had a female householder with no husband present, and 28.2% were non-families. 25.6% of all households were made up of individuals, and 20.5% had someone living alone who was 65 years of age or older. The average household size was 2.59 and the average family size was 2.96.

In the city, the population was spread out, with 32.7% under the age of 18, 5.0% from 18 to 24, 29.7% from 25 to 44, 16.8% from 45 to 64, and 15.8% who were 65 years of age or older. The median age was 32 years. For every 100 females, there were 80.4 males. For every 100 females age 18 and over, there were 100.0 males.

The median income for a household in the city was $25,000, and the median income for a family was $27,500. Males had a median income of $31,250 versus $12,917 for females. The per capita income for the city was $13,125. There were 11.1% of families and 10.3% of the population living below the poverty line, including 9.1% of under eighteens and 10.5% of those over 64.

== Education ==
The community is served by Columbus USD 493 public school district.
