= Sherman, Kansas =

Unincorporated community in Cherokee County, Kansas

Coordinates: 37°15′26″N 95°03′26″W

Sherman is an unincorporated community in Cherokee County, Kansas, United States.

== History ==
A post office was opened in Sherman City in 1867, and it was renamed Sherman in 1894. The post office remained in operation until it was discontinued in 1964.
