= Pleasant View Township, Kansas =

Pleasant View Township
- Township
- Location in Cherokee County
- Coordinates: 37°16′30″N 094°40′31″W
- Country: United States
- State: Kansas
- County: Cherokee

Area
  - Total: 52.44 sq mi (135.82 km^{2})
  - Land: 52.37 sq mi (135.64 km^{2})
  - Water: 0.069 sq mi (0.18 km^{2}) 0.13%
- Elevation: 860 ft (262 m)

Population (2020)
  - Total: 585
  - Density: 11.2/sq mi (4.31/km^{2})
- GNIS feature ID: 0469334

Pleasant View Township is a township in Cherokee County, Kansas, United States. As of the 2020 census, its population was 585.

== Geography ==
Pleasant View Township covers an area of 52.44 square miles (135.8 km^{2}) and contains no incorporated settlements. According to the USGS, it contains four cemeteries: Bird, Crocker, Lone Oak and Old Pleasant View.

The streams of Brush Creek, Long Branch and Taylor Branch run through this township.
