= Cherokee Township, Cherokee County, Kansas =

- Township
- Location within Cherokee County

- Location within the state of Kansas
- Coordinates: 37°17′47″N 094°46′21″W
- Country: United States
- State: Kansas
- County: Cherokee

Area
  - Total: 22.2 sq mi (57.5 km^{2})
  - Land: 22.19 sq mi (57.46 km^{2})
  - Water: 0.019 sq mi (0.05 km^{2}) 0.09%
- Elevation: 912 ft (278 m)

Population (2020)
  - Total: 320
  - Density: 14/sq mi (5.6/km^{2})
- Time zone: UTC-6 (CST)
  - Summer (DST): UTC-5 (CDT)
- Area code: 620
- FIPS code: 20-12800
- GNIS ID: 469617

Cherokee Township is a township in Cherokee County, Kansas, United States. As of the 2020 census, its population was 320.

== Geography ==
Cherokee Township covers an area of 22.2 square miles (57 km^{2}) surrounding the incorporated settlement of Weir. According to the USGS, it contains three cemeteries: Council Corners, New Pleasant View and Saint Anthony.
