= Faulkner, Kansas =

Unincorporated community in Cherokee County, Kansas

- Unincorporated community
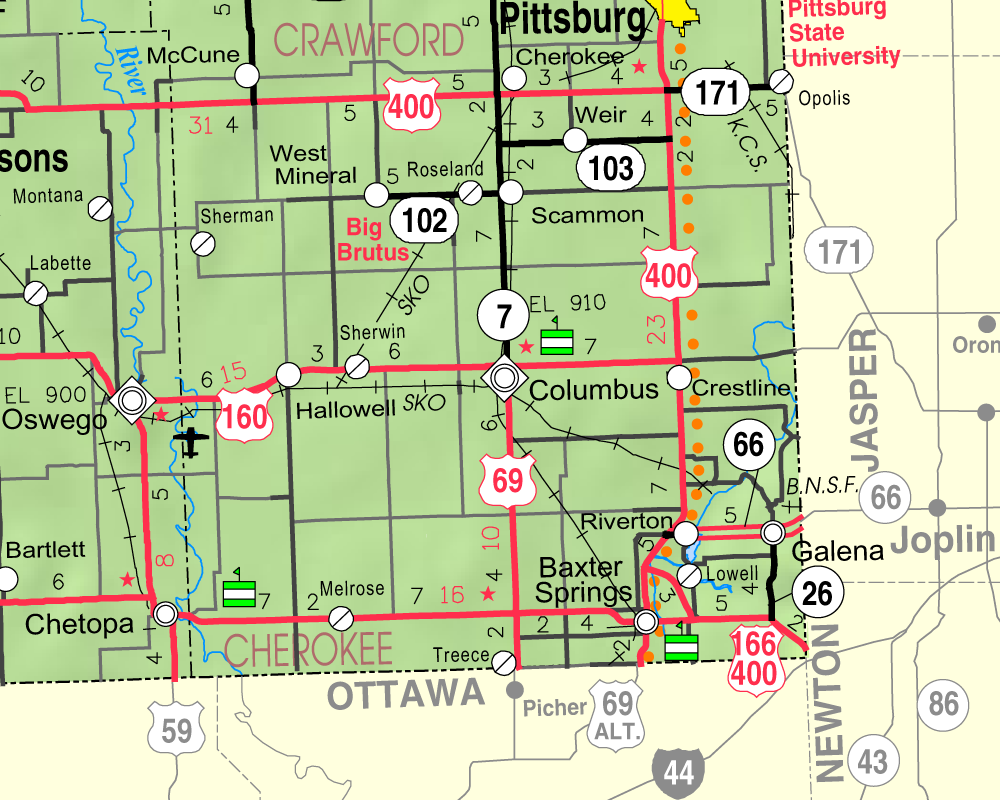
- KDOT map of Cherokee County (legend)

- Location within Kansas Location within the United States
- Coordinates: 37°06′05″N 95°00′42″W
- Country: United States
- State: Kansas
- County: Cherokee
- Elevation: 830 ft (250 m)
- Time zone: UTC-6 (CST)
  - Summer (DST): UTC-5 (CDT)
- Area code: 620
- FIPS code: 20-23300
- GNIS ID: 484435

Faulkner is an unincorporated community in Cherokee County, Kansas, United States. It is located southeast of Oswego along SW 100th St.

== History ==
Faulkner was a shipping point on the Missouri Pacific Railroad.

== Economy ==
Faulkner has one business, Faulkner Grain.
