= Ross Township, Pike County, Illinois =

Coordinates: 39°27′06″N 90°58′40″W

Ross Township
- Township
- Location in Pike County

- Pike County's location in Illinois
- Country: United States
- State: Illinois
- County: Pike
- Established: July 1879

Area
  - Total: 30.82 sq mi (79.8 km^{2})
  - Land: 27.46 sq mi (71.1 km^{2})
  - Water: 3.36 sq mi (8.7 km^{2}) 10.90%

Population (2010)
  - Estimate (2016): 68
  - Density: 2.5/sq mi (0.97/km^{2})
- Time zone: UTC-6 (CST)
  - Summer (DST): UTC-5 (CDT)
- FIPS code: 17-149-65936

Ross Township is located in Pike County, Illinois. As of the 2010 census, its population was 70 and it contained 54 housing units. Ross originally formed as Spring Lake Township from a portion of Atlas Township in July, 1879, but changed its name to Ross shortly after the formation with the exact date unknown.

== Geography ==
According to the 2010 census, the township has a total area of 30.82 square miles (79.8 km^{2}), of which 27.46 square miles (71.1 km^{2}) (or 89.10%) is land and 3.36 square miles (8.7 km^{2}) (or 10.90%) is water.

== Demographics ==
Historical population
Census	Pop.	Note	%±
2016 (est.)	68
U.S. Decennial Census
