= Ross Township, Cherokee County, Kansas =

Ross Township
- Township
- Location in Cherokee County
- Coordinates: 37°16′00″N 094°53′01″W
- Country: United States
- State: Kansas
- County: Cherokee

Area
  - Total: 54.40 sq mi (140.89 km^{2})
  - Land: 54.0 sq mi (139.9 km^{2})
  - Water: 0.39 sq mi (1 km^{2}) 0.71%
- Elevation: 899 ft (274 m)

Population (2020)
  - Total: 650
  - Density: 12/sq mi (4.6/km^{2})
- GNIS feature ID: 0469492

Ross Township is a township in Cherokee County, Kansas, United States. As of the 2020 census, its population was 650.

== Geography ==
Ross Township covers an area of 54.4 square miles (141 km^{2}) and contains two incorporated settlements: Roseland and West Mineral. According to the USGS, it contains one cemetery, Edgmand.

Mineral Lake is within this township.
