= Cherokee, Kansas =

City in Crawford County, Kansas

- City
- Location within Crawford County and Kansas

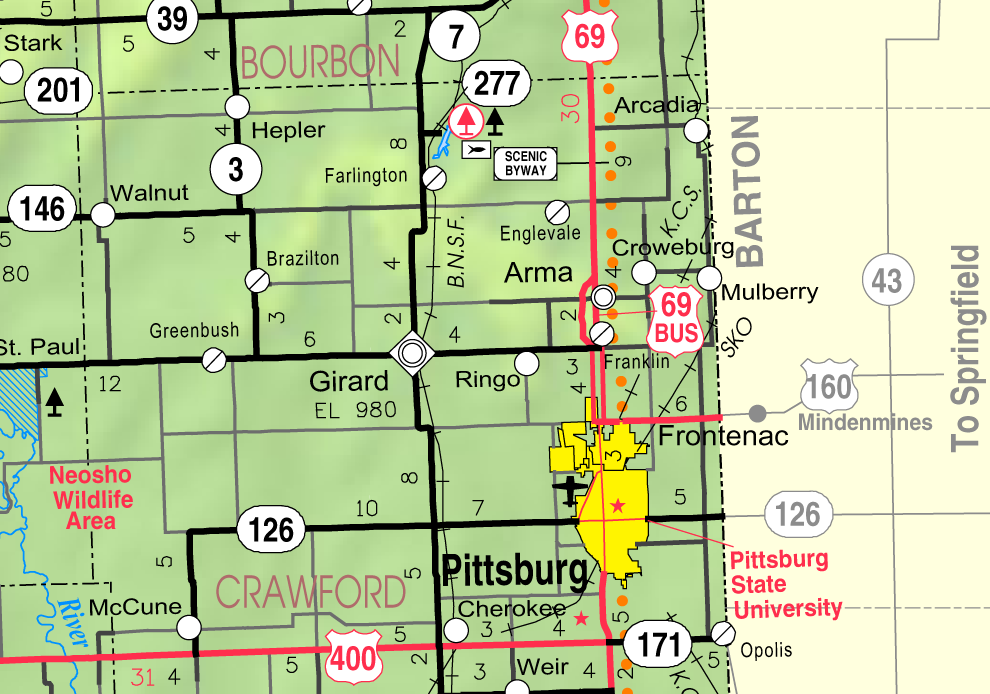
- KDOT map of Crawford County (legend)
- Coordinates: 37°20′42″N 94°49′17″W
- Country: United States
- State: Kansas
- County: Crawford
- Founded: 1870
- Incorporated: 1874

Area
  - Total: 0.71 sq mi (1.85 km^{2})
  - Land: 0.71 sq mi (1.85 km^{2})
  - Water: 0 sq mi (0.00 km^{2})
- Elevation: 932 ft (284 m)

Population (2020)
  - Total: 590
  - Density: 830/sq mi (320/km^{2})
- Time zone: UTC-6 (CST)
  - Summer (DST): UTC-5 (CDT)
- ZIP Code: 66724
- Area code: 620
- FIPS code: 20-12825
- GNIS ID: 2393818
- Website: cityofcherokeeks.com

Cherokee is a city in Crawford County, Kansas, United States. As of the 2020 census, the population of the city was 590.

== History ==
Cherokee had its start in the year 1870 by the building of the railroads through that territory. The town was located at the intersection of three railroads: The Memphis, Kansas & Colorado Railroad; The Kansas City, Fort Scott & Gulf Railroad; and the Missouri Pacific Railroad. It was named from Cherokee County, where it was erroneously thought to be located.

The first post office in Cherokee was established in August, 1870.

== Geography ==
According to the United States Census Bureau, the city has a total area of 0.71 square miles (1.84 km^{2}), all land.

== Demographics ==
Historical population
Census	Pop.	Note	%±
1880	556		—
1890	1,087		95.5%
1900	1,326		22.0%
1910	1,452		9.5%
1920	1,091		−24.9%
1930	1,158		6.1%
1940	1,101		−4.9%
1950	849		−22.9%
1960	797		−6.1%
1970	790		−0.9%
1980	775		−1.9%
1990	651		−16.0%
2000	722		10.9%
2010	714		−1.1%
2020	590		−17.4%
U.S. Decennial Census

=== 2020 census ===
The 2020 United States census counted 590 people, 246 households, and 151 families in Cherokee. The population density was 824.0 per square mile (318.2/km^{2}). There were 306 housing units at an average density of 427.4 per square mile (165.0/km^{2}). The racial makeup was 90.68% (535) white or European American (89.83% non-Hispanic white), 0.0% (0) black or African-American, 0.85% (5) Native American or Alaska Native, 0.0% (0) Asian, 0.17% (1) Pacific Islander or Native Hawaiian, 0.34% (2) from other races, and 7.97% (47) from two or more races. Hispanic or Latino of any race was 1.36% (8) of the population.

Of the 246 households, 26.0% had children under the age of 18; 39.4% were married couples living together; 26.8% had a female householder with no spouse or partner present. 32.1% of households consisted of individuals and 14.2% had someone living alone who was 65 years of age or older. The average household size was 2.5 and the average family size was 3.4. The percent of those with a bachelor's degree or higher was estimated to be 18.6% of the population.

23.2% of the population was under the age of 18, 7.1% from 18 to 24, 22.2% from 25 to 44, 27.6% from 45 to 64, and 19.8% who were 65 years of age or older. The median age was 41.4 years. For every 100 females, there were 96.0 males. For every 100 females ages 18 and older, there were 97.0 males.

The 2016–2020 5-year American Community Survey estimates show that the median household income was $40,714 (with a margin of error of +/- $11,178) and the median family income was $56,739 (+/- $5,061). Males had a median income of $30,417 (+/- $6,484) versus $30,057 (+/- $5,795) for females. The median income for those above 16 years old was $30,203 (+/- $3,591). Approximately, 8.1% of families and 15.2% of the population were below the poverty line, including 9.8% of those under the age of 18 and 25.4% of those ages 65 or over.

=== 2010 census ===
As of the census of 2010, there were 714 people, 289 households, and 187 families living in the city. The population density was 1,005.6 inhabitants per square mile (388.3/km^{2}). There were 324 housing units at an average density of 456.3 per square mile (176.2/km^{2}). The racial makeup of the city was 95.9% White, 0.1% African American, 0.8% Native American, 0.3% from other races, and 2.8% from two or more races. Hispanic or Latino of any race were 1.5% of the population.

There were 289 households, of which 33.2% had children under the age of 18 living with them, 46.7% were married couples living together, 11.8% had a female householder with no husband present, 6.2% had a male householder with no wife present, and 35.3% were non-families. 27.3% of all households were made up of individuals, and 10.8% had someone living alone who was 65 years of age or older. The average household size was 2.47 and the average family size was 2.97.

The median age in the city was 39.7 years. 27% of residents were under the age of 18; 8.3% were between the ages of 18 and 24; 24.2% were from 25 to 44; 26.8% were from 45 to 64; and 13.9% were 65 years of age or older. The gender makeup of the city was 51.5% male and 48.5% female.

=== 2000 census ===
As of the census of 2000, there were 722 people, 301 households, and 192 families living in the city. The population density was 1,052.2 inhabitants per square mile (406.3/km^{2}). There were 336 housing units at an average density of 489.7 per square mile (189.1/km^{2}). The racial makeup of the city was 95.43% White, 0.28% African American, 0.97% Native American, 0.14% Asian, and 3.19% from two or more races. Hispanic or Latino of any race were 0.42% of the population.

There were 301 households, out of which 29.6% had children under the age of 18 living with them, 50.5% were married couples living together, 8.0% had a female householder with no husband present, and 36.2% were non-families. 32.2% of all households were made up of individuals, and 16.6% had someone living alone who was 65 years of age or older. The average household size was 2.40 and the average family size was 3.03.

In the city, the population was spread out, with 26.7% under the age of 18, 6.8% from 18 to 24, 24.9% from 25 to 44, 25.1% from 45 to 64, and 16.5% who were 65 years of age or older. The median age was 38 years. For every 100 females, there were 96.7 males. For every 100 females age 18 and over, there were 94.5 males.

The median income for a household in the city was $29,083, and the median income for a family was $36,389. Males had a median income of $26,739 versus $18,810 for females. The per capita income for the city was $14,693. About 7.8% of families and 14.5% of the population were below the poverty line, including 24.4% of those under age 18 and 14.4% of those age 65 or over.

== Government ==
The Cherokee government consists of a mayor and five council members. The council meets the 2nd Thursday of each month at 6:30PM.

== Education ==
Cherokee is served by USD 247 Southeast. The Southeast High School mascot is Lancers.

Crawford County Community High School in Cherokee was closed in school unification.

== Notable people ==
- Page Cavanaugh, jazz and pop musician, was born in Cherokee.
- Patricia Martin, children's author, was born in Cherokee.
- Samuel Triplett, Spanish–American War Medal of Honor recipient.
