= Ross Township =

Ross Township may refer to:

== Illinois ==
- Ross Township, Edgar County, Illinois
- Ross Township, Pike County, Illinois
- Ross Township, Vermilion County, Illinois

== Indiana ==
- Ross Township, Clinton County, Indiana
- Ross Township, Lake County, Indiana

== Iowa ==
- Ross Township, Franklin County, Iowa
- Ross Township, Taylor County, Iowa

== Kansas ==
- Ross Township, Cherokee County, Kansas
- Ross Township, Osborne County, Kansas, in Osborne County, Kansas

== Michigan ==
- Ross Township, Michigan

== Minnesota ==
- Ross Township, Roseau County, Minnesota

== North Dakota ==
- Ross Township, Mountrail County, North Dakota, in Mountrail County, North Dakota

== Ohio ==
- Ross Township, Butler County, Ohio
- Ross Township, Greene County, Ohio
- Ross Township, Jefferson County, Ohio
- Ross Township, Wood County, Ohio

== Pennsylvania ==
- Ross Township, Allegheny County, Pennsylvania
- Ross Township, Luzerne County, Pennsylvania
- Ross Township, Monroe County, Pennsylvania
