= Cherokee County, Kansas =

County in Kansas, United States

- County
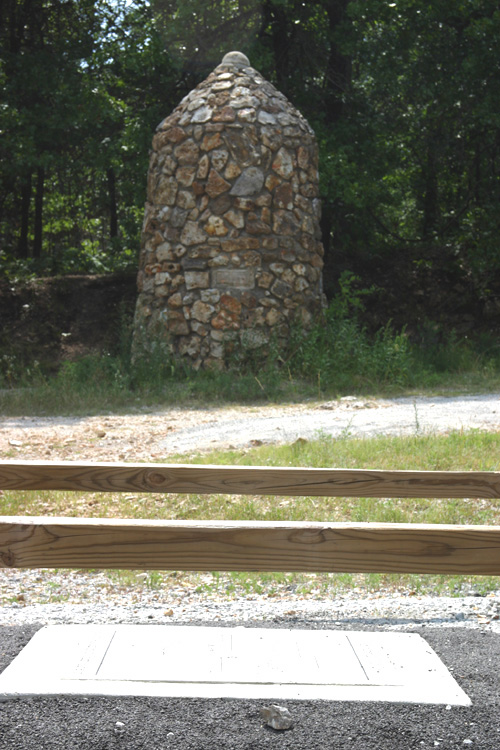
- Tri-State Marker (2006)

- Location within the U.S. state of Kansas
- Coordinates: 37°10′N 94°51′W
- Country: United States
- State: Kansas
- Founded: February 18, 1860
- Named for: Cherokee Native Americans
- Seat: Columbus
- Largest city: Baxter Springs

Area
  - Total: 591 sq mi (1,530 km^{2})
  - Land: 588 sq mi (1,520 km^{2})
  - Water: 3.5 sq mi (9.1 km^{2}) 0.6%

Population (2020)
  - Total: 19,362
  - Estimate (2025): 19,105 ▼
  - Density: 32.9/sq mi (12.7/km^{2})
- Time zone: UTC−6 (Central)
  - Summer (DST): UTC−5 (CDT)
- Area code: 620
- Congressional district: 2nd
- Website: cherokeecountyks.gov

Cherokee County is a U.S. county located in Southeast Kansas. Its county seat is Columbus, and its most populous city is Baxter Springs. As of the 2020 census, the county population was 19,362. The county was named for the Cherokee tribe. Cherokee County is considered part of the Joplin, Missouri, metropolitan area.

== History ==
=== 19th century ===
In 1803, United States acquired from France the 828,000-square mile Louisiana Purchase, the former French lands west of the Mississippi River, for 2.83 cents per acre. This territory included most of the land for modern-day Kansas.

In the 1830s, the United States conducted Indian Removal of the Five Civilized Tribes from the Southeast region, to extinguish their land claims and allow European-American settlement in the area. They were given lands in what was called Indian Territory west of the Mississippi River, mostly in present-day Oklahoma. This part of Kansas was included at the time in the Cherokee Neutral Lands, and the county was named after this tribe.

In 1854, the U.S. organized the Kansas Territory. Settlers began to move into the territory, with violence breaking out between supporters of slavery and those who wanted to abolish it. In 1861, Kansas was admitted as the 34th U.S. state; its constitution prohibited slavery. It was first founded in 1855, and in 1860, it was renamed Cherokee County.

== Geography ==
According to the U.S. Census Bureau, the county has a total area of 591 square miles (1,530 km^{2}), of which 588 square miles (1,520 km^{2}) is land and 3.5 square miles (9.1 km^{2}) (0.6%) is water.

=== Adjacent counties ===
- Crawford County (north)
- Jasper County, Missouri (east)
- Newton County, Missouri (southeast)
- Ottawa County, Oklahoma (south)
- Craig County, Oklahoma (southwest)
- Labette County (west)

=== Major highways ===
- US-69
- US-160
- US-166
- US-400
- K-7
- K-26
- K-66 – former US 66
- K-96
- K-102
- K-103

== Demographics ==
Historical population
Census	Pop.	Note	%±
1860	1,501		—
1870	11,038		635.4%
1880	21,905		98.5%
1890	27,770		26.8%
1900	42,694		53.7%
1910	38,162		−10.6%
1920	33,609		−11.9%
1930	31,457		−6.4%
1940	29,817		−5.2%
1950	25,144		−15.7%
1960	22,279		−11.4%
1970	21,549		−3.3%
1980	22,304		3.5%
1990	21,374		−4.2%
2000	22,605		5.8%
2010	21,603		−4.4%
2020	19,362		−10.4%
2025 (est.)	19,105	▼	−1.3%
U.S. Decennial Census; 1790-1960 1900-1990; 1990-2000 2010-2020

=== 2020 census ===
As of the 2020 census, the county had a population of 19,362. The median age was 42.4 years. 23.2% of residents were under the age of 18 and 20.0% of residents were 65 years of age or older. For every 100 females there were 98.2 males, and for every 100 females age 18 and over there were 96.4 males age 18 and over. 0.0% of residents lived in urban areas, while 100.0% lived in rural areas.

The racial makeup of the county was 85.1% White, 0.4% Black or African American, 4.1% American Indian and Alaska Native, 0.3% Asian, 0.1% Native Hawaiian and Pacific Islander, 0.8% from some other race, and 9.1% from two or more races. Hispanic or Latino residents of any race comprised 2.7% of the population.

There were 7,853 households in the county, of which 28.7% had children under the age of 18 living with them and 24.8% had a female householder with no spouse or partner present. About 27.9% of all households were made up of individuals and 14.0% had someone living alone who was 65 years of age or older.

There were 9,113 housing units, of which 13.8% were vacant. Among occupied housing units, 73.7% were owner-occupied and 26.3% were renter-occupied. The homeowner vacancy rate was 2.6% and the rental vacancy rate was 11.4%.

=== 2000 census ===
As of the 2000 census, there were 22,605 people, 8,875 households, and 6,239 families residing in the county. The population density was 38 people per square mile (15 people/km^{2}). There were 10,031 housing units at an average density of 17 per square mile (6.6/km^{2}). The racial makeup of the county was 92.27% White, 0.61% Black or African American, 3.45% Native American, 0.23% Asian, 0.04% Pacific Islander, 0.50% from other races, and 2.90% from two or more races. Hispanic or Latino of any race were 1.29% of the population.

There were 8,875 households, out of which 32.40% had children under the age of 18 living with them, 56.60% were married couples living together, 9.70% had a female householder with no husband present, and 29.70% were non-families. 26.30% of all households were made up of individuals, and 13.00% had someone living alone who was 65 years of age or older. The average household size was 2.51 and the average family size was 3.02.

In the county, the population was spread out, with 26.50% under the age of 18, 8.40% from 18 to 24, 26.90% from 25 to 44, 23.10% from 45 to 64, and 15.20% who were 65 years of age or older. The median age was 37 years. For every 100 females there were 94.20 males. For every 100 females age 18 and over, there were 90.70 males.

The median income for a household in the county was $30,505, and the median income for a family was $37,284. Males had a median income of $29,045 versus $19,675 for females. The per capita income for the county was $14,710. About 11.40% of families and 14.30% of the population were below the poverty line, including 19.40% of those under age 18 and 10.60% of those age 65 or over.

== Government ==
=== Presidential elections ===
For most of its history, Cherokee County had more of a Democratic lean in presidential elections than the rest of the state, particularly before 1968. Since then, it has only voted for Democratic candidates twice. In 1976 & 1992, it was their second and fourth best county in the state, respectively. From 1996 on, the county has swung powerfully Republican similar to the rest of Southeast Kansas.

Presidential election results

United States presidential election results for Cherokee County, Kansas
Year	Republican		Democratic		Third party(ies)	
Year	No.	%	No.	%	No.	%
1888	2,935	45.62%	2,038	31.68%	1,461	22.71%
1892	2,696	41.43%	0	0.00%	3,812	58.57%
1896	3,505	40.20%	5,108	58.58%	106	1.22%
1900	4,478	45.18%	5,302	53.50%	131	1.32%
1904	4,586	55.81%	2,253	27.42%	1,378	16.77%
1908	3,893	44.26%	3,819	43.42%	1,083	12.31%
1912	1,994	26.54%	2,641	35.15%	2,878	38.31%
1916	4,350	37.55%	6,188	53.41%	1,047	9.04%
1920	5,466	55.83%	3,832	39.14%	492	5.03%
1924	5,437	52.90%	3,071	29.88%	1,770	17.22%
1928	7,478	66.20%	3,442	30.47%	376	3.33%
1932	4,045	34.05%	7,442	62.64%	393	3.31%
1936	5,445	40.61%	7,894	58.88%	69	0.51%
1940	6,600	49.27%	6,670	49.79%	126	0.94%
1944	5,458	54.65%	4,468	44.73%	62	0.62%
1948	4,616	47.77%	4,854	50.23%	193	2.00%
1952	6,261	57.37%	4,597	42.12%	56	0.51%
1956	5,824	58.39%	4,112	41.22%	39	0.39%
1960	5,753	56.45%	4,366	42.84%	73	0.72%
1964	3,730	39.28%	5,720	60.23%	47	0.49%
1968	4,211	47.46%	3,597	40.54%	1,064	11.99%
1972	6,019	67.03%	2,806	31.25%	155	1.73%
1976	3,957	42.93%	5,154	55.91%	107	1.16%
1980	5,296	54.81%	3,969	41.08%	397	4.11%
1984	5,801	60.72%	3,663	38.34%	89	0.93%
1988	4,281	50.95%	4,069	48.43%	52	0.62%
1992	3,589	36.78%	4,083	41.85%	2,085	21.37%
1996	4,138	45.76%	3,771	41.70%	1,134	12.54%
2000	5,014	54.92%	3,783	41.43%	333	3.65%
2004	6,083	61.36%	3,726	37.59%	104	1.05%
2008	5,886	60.90%	3,594	37.19%	185	1.91%
2012	5,456	63.66%	2,930	34.19%	185	2.16%
2016	6,182	71.72%	2,005	23.26%	433	5.02%
2020	6,766	73.94%	2,194	23.98%	191	2.09%
2024	6,584	75.53%	1,970	22.60%	163	1.87%

=== Laws ===
Although the Kansas Constitution was amended in 1986 to allow the sale of alcoholic liquor by the individual drink with the approval of voters, Cherokee County voters chose to remain a prohibition, or "dry", county on Sunday until 2012.

== Education ==
=== Unified school districts ===
School districts based in the county include:

- Southeast USD 247 (previously was Cherokee USD 247)
- Riverton USD 404
- Columbus USD 493
- Galena USD 499
- Baxter Springs USD 508

Other school districts include:

- Chetopa-St. Paul USD 505
- Oswego USD 504
- Pittsburg USD 250

== Communities ==
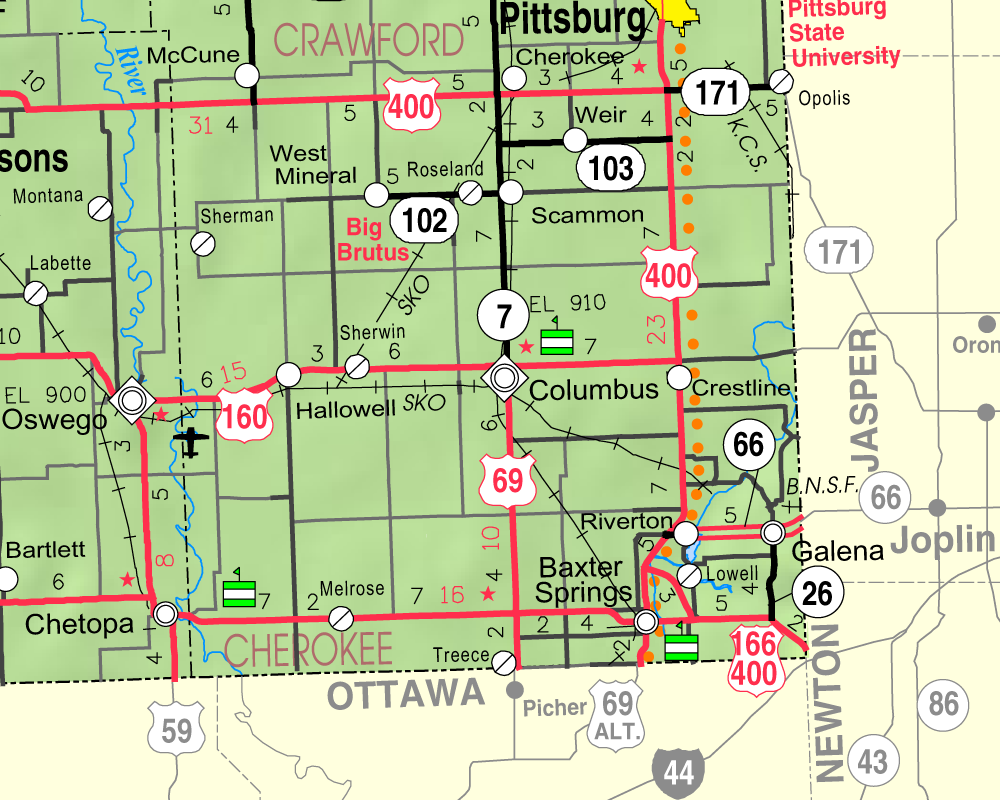
2005 map of Cherokee County (map legend)

List of townships / incorporated cities / unincorporated communities / extinct former communities within Cherokee County.

=== Cities ===
- Baxter Springs
- Columbus (county seat)
- Galena
- Roseland
- Scammon
- Weir
- West Mineral

=== Unincorporated communities ===
‡ means a community has portions in an adjacent county. † means a community is designated a Census-Designated Place (CDP) by the United States Census Bureau.

- Carona
- Cokedale
- Crestline†
- Empire City
- Faulkner
- Hallowell†
- Keelville
- Kniveton‡
- Lawton
- Lowell†
- Melrose
- Neutral
- Riverton†
- Sherman
- Sherwin
- Skidmore
- Stippville
- Turck

=== Ghost towns ===
- Treece, officially disincorporated in 2012

=== Townships ===
Cherokee County is divided into fourteen townships. The cities of Baxter Springs, Columbus, Galena, Scammon, and Weir are considered governmentally independent and are excluded from the census figures for the townships. In the following table, the population center is the largest city (or cities) included in that township's population total, if it is of a significant size.

Township	FIPS	Population center	Population	Population density /km^{2} (/sq mi)	Land area km^{2} (sq mi)	Water area km^{2} (sq mi)	Water %	Geographic coordinates
Cherokee	12800		336	6 (15)	57 (22)	0 (0)	0.08%	37°18′33″N 94°45′36″W
Crawford	16225		646	7 (18)	94 (36)	0 (0)	0.24%	37°9′21″N 94°47′11″W
Garden	25250		3,039	41 (105)	75 (29)	2 (1)	2.80%	37°2′55″N 94°41′18″W
Lola	42350		382	3 (9)	115 (44)	1 (0)	0.50%	37°10′25″N 95°0′15″W
Lowell	43075		672	20 (52)	33 (13)	1 (0)	3.04%	37°6′11″N 94°40′23″W
Lyon	43400		528	4 (11)	130 (50)	0 (0)	0.08%	37°2′19″N 94°52′37″W
Mineral	47000		254	3 (8)	79 (31)	0 (0)	0.15%	37°15′32″N 94°47′29″W
Neosho	49725		306	2 (5)	157 (61)	2 (1)	1.08%	37°3′15″N 95°1′37″W
Pleasant View	56675		658	5 (13)	136 (52)	0 (0)	0.14%	37°17′4″N 94°40′1″W
Ross	61350		893	6 (17)	140 (54)	1 (0)	0.71%	37°16′29″N 94°53′55″W
Salamanca	62575		569	6 (17)	89 (34)	0 (0)	0.07%	37°10′3″N 94°52′37″W
Shawnee	64475		505	6 (15)	90 (35)	1 (0)	0.61%	37°9′30″N 94°40′18″W
Sheridan	64625		249	1 (4)	172 (67)	1 (1)	0.79%	37°15′41″N 95°0′15″W
Spring Valley	67725		1,007	8 (21)	122 (47)	0 (0)	0.36%	37°3′11″N 94°46′5″W
Sources: "Census 2000 U.S. Gazetteer Files". U.S. Census Bureau, Geography Division. Archived from the original on August 2, 2002.

== See also ==
- Mined Land Wildlife Area
- National Register of Historic Places listings in Cherokee County, Kansas

Community information for Kansas

- Kansas locations by per capita income
- List of counties in Kansas
- List of townships in Kansas
- List of cities in Kansas
- List of unincorporated communities in Kansas
- List of ghost towns in Kansas
