= Weir, Kansas =

City in Cherokee County, Kansas

- City
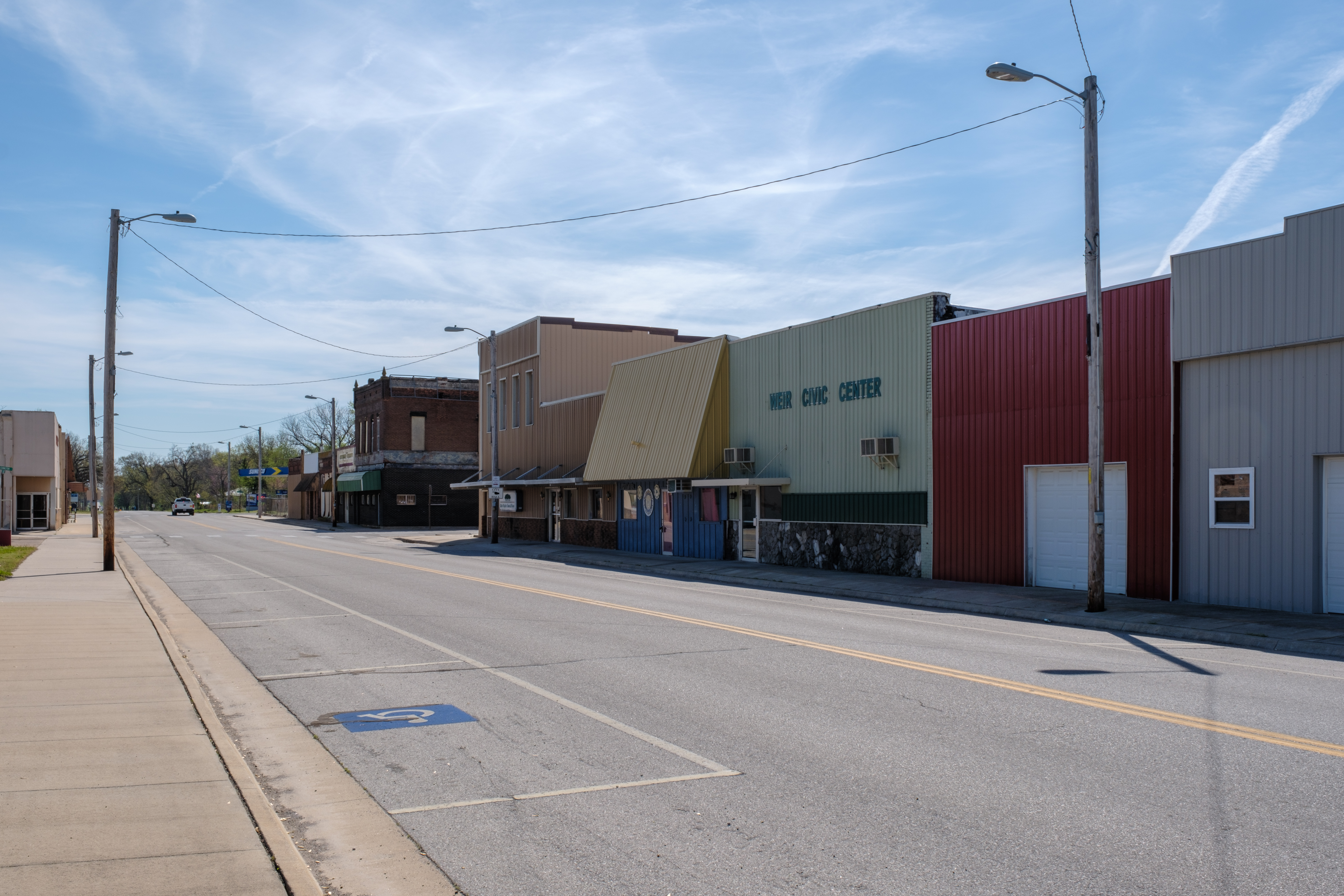
- Downtown Weir (2024)

- Location within Cherokee County and Kansas

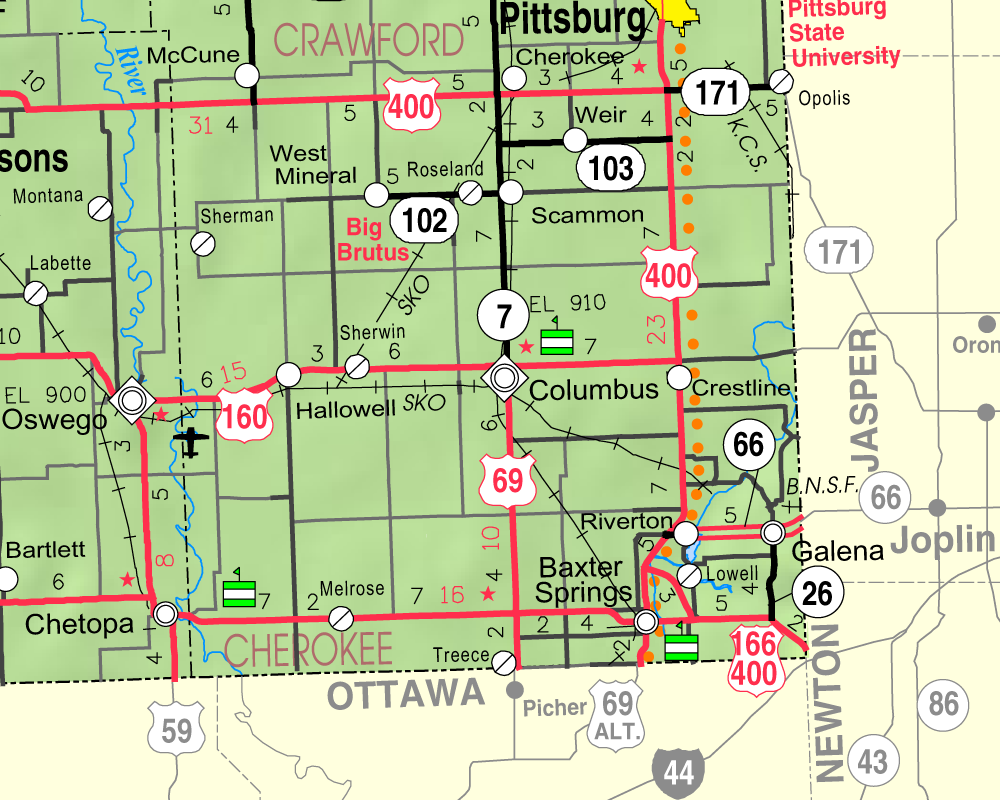
- KDOT map of Cherokee County (legend)
- Coordinates: 37°18′34″N 94°46′27″W
- Country: United States
- State: Kansas
- County: Cherokee
- Founded: 1872
- Incorporated: 1875
- Named for: T. M. Weir

Area
  - Total: 1.14 sq mi (2.95 km^{2})
  - Land: 1.14 sq mi (2.95 km^{2})
  - Water: 0.0039 sq mi (0.01 km^{2})
- Elevation: 919 ft (280 m)

Population (2020)
  - Total: 569
  - Density: 500/sq mi (193/km^{2})
- Time zone: UTC−6 (CST)
  - Summer (DST): UTC−5 (CDT)
- ZIP Code: 66781
- Area code: 620
- FIPS code: 20-76350
- GNIS ID: 485657

Weir is a city in Cherokee County, Kansas, United States. As of the 2020 census, the population of the city was 569.

== History ==
Weir was founded in 1872 and is named after landowner T. M. Weir, who donated forty acres as a townsite. The first post office in Weir was established in 1875.

In 1873, the Weir City Zinc Company was the first zinc smelter to open at Weir. Weir was also one of the first locations in Kansas where coal was mined commercially. Weir is, in large part, undermined at a depth of about 30 feet where coal was mined from a four-foot-thick vein. In 1899, more than 200 African-American miners traveled to Weir from Pana, Illinois, after being attacked by white union members in what was called the Pana riot during a coal mining strike. They were eager for work and unwilling to return to Alabama, from where they had been recruited.

== Geography ==
According to the United States Census Bureau, the city has a total area of 0.94 square miles (2.43 km^{2}), all land.

Weir is south of U.S. Route 400 and is located on K-103.

=== Climate ===
The climate in this area is characterized by hot, humid summers and generally mild to cool winters. According to the Köppen Climate Classification system, Weir has a humid subtropical climate, abbreviated "Cfa" on climate maps.

== Demographics ==
Historical population
Census	Pop.	Note	%±
1880	376		—
1890	2,138		468.6%
1900	2,977		39.2%
1910	2,289		−23.1%
1920	1,945		−15.0%
1930	1,115		−42.7%
1940	1,038		−6.9%
1950	819		−21.1%
1960	694		−15.3%
1970	740		6.6%
1980	705		−4.7%
1990	730		3.5%
2000	780		6.8%
2010	686		−12.1%
2020	569		−17.1%
U.S. Decennial Census

=== 2010 census ===
As of the census of 2010, there were 686 people, 266 households, and 176 families living in the city. The population density was 729.8 inhabitants per square mile (281.8/km^{2}). There were 309 housing units at an average density of 328.7 per square mile (126.9/km^{2}). The racial makeup of the city was 94.5% White, 0.3% African American, 2.6% Native American, 0.9% from other races, and 1.7% from two or more races. Hispanic or Latino of any race were 2.2% of the population.

There were 266 households, of which 31.2% had children under the age of 18 living with them, 50.0% were married couples living together, 10.5% had a female householder with no husband present, 5.6% had a male householder with no wife present, and 33.8% were non-families. Of all households 26.3% were made up of individuals, and 10.6% had someone living alone who was 65 years of age or older. The average household size was 2.58 and the average family size was 3.15.

The median age in the city was 38.8 years. 25.8% of residents were under the age of 18; 8.4% were between the ages of 18 and 24; 24.7% were from 25 to 44; 27.2% were from 45 to 64; and 14.1% were 65 years of age or older. The gender makeup of the city was 50.3% male and 49.7% female.

=== 2000 census ===
As of the census of 2000, there were 780 people, 310 households, and 212 families living in the city. The population density was 745.3 inhabitants per square mile (287.8/km^{2}). There were 352 housing units at an average density of 336.3 per square mile (129.8/km^{2}). The racial makeup of the city was 97.31% White, 0.38% African American, 0.64% Native American, 0.26% from other races, and 1.41% from two or more races. Hispanic or Latino of any race were 0.77% of the population.

There were 310 households, out of which 33.2% had children under the age of 18 living with them, 53.9% were married couples living together, 10.6% had a female householder with no husband present, and 31.6% were non-families. Of all households 25.5% were made up of individuals, and 13.5% had someone living alone who was 65 years of age or older. The average household size was 2.52 and the average family size was 3.05.

In the city, the population was spread out, with 27.8% under the age of 18, 7.8% from 18 to 24, 30.4% from 25 to 44, 21.7% from 45 to 64, and 12.3% who were 65 years of age or older. The median age was 36 years. For every 100 females, there were 99.5 males. For every 100 females age 18 and over, there were 92.2 males.

The median income for a household in the city was $27,054, and the median income for a family was $35,476. Males had a median income of $26,406 versus $21,518 for females. The per capita income for the city was $16,561. About 8.7% of families and 13.2% of the population were below the poverty line, including 11.3% of those under age 18 and 11.4% of those age 65 or over.
