= West Mineral, Kansas =

City in Cherokee County, Kansas

- City
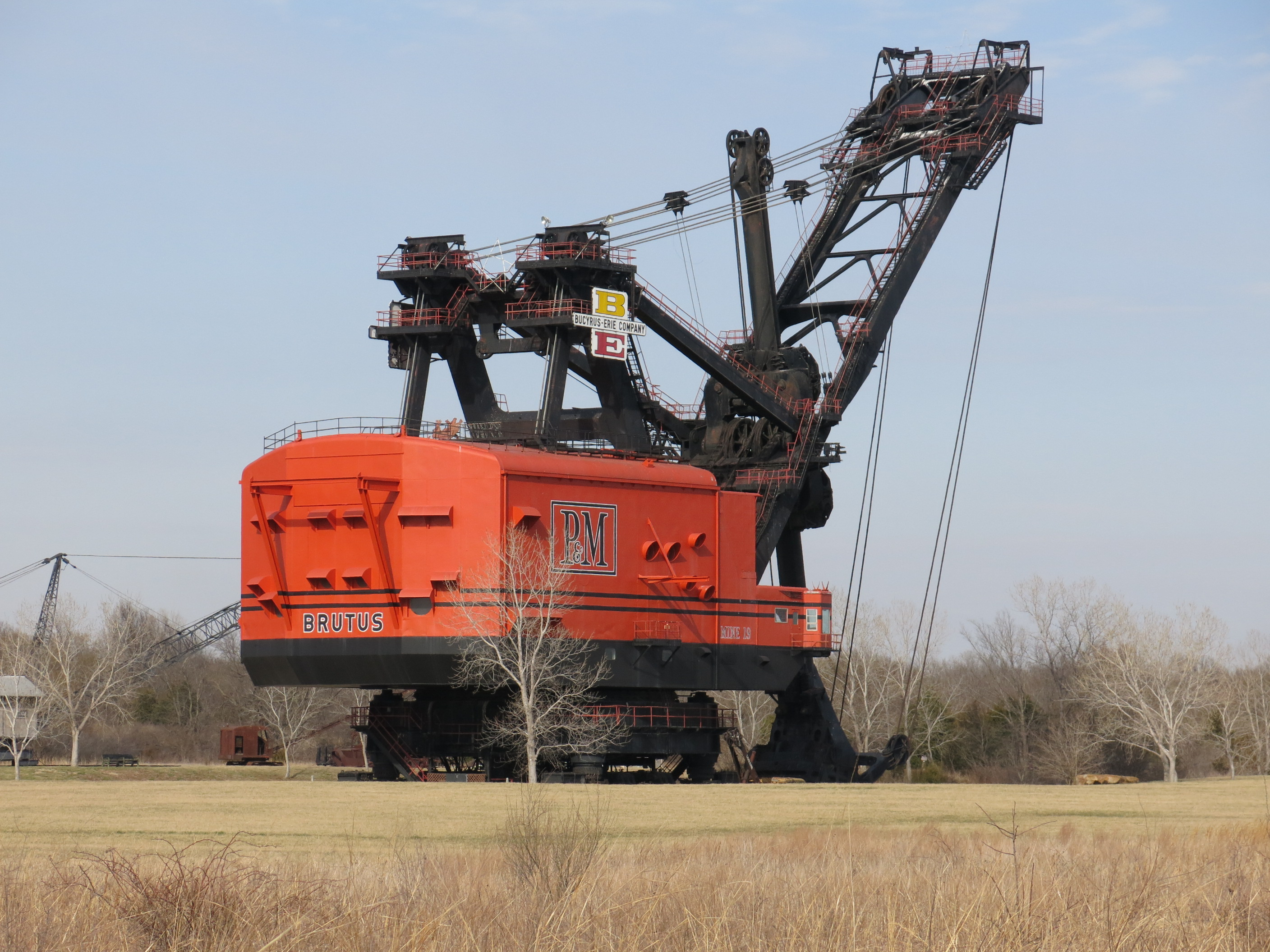
- Big Brutus near West Mineral (2014)

- Location within Cherokee County and Kansas

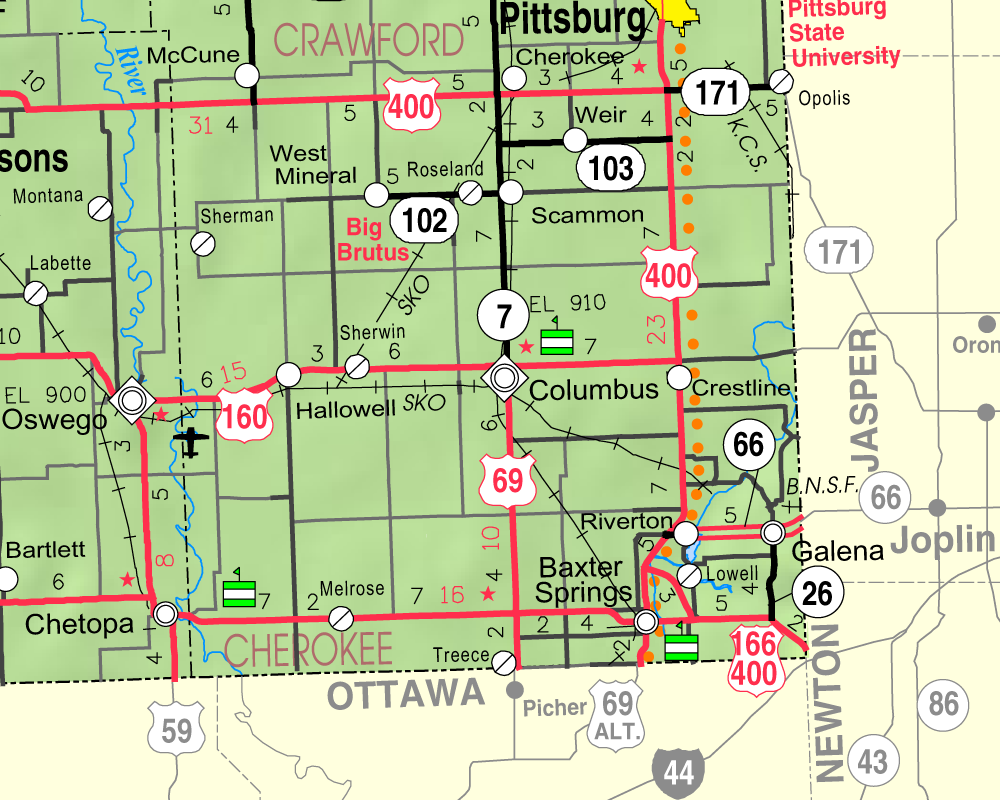
- KDOT map of Cherokee County (legend)
- Coordinates: 37°17′02″N 94°55′36″W
- Country: United States
- State: Kansas
- County: Cherokee
- Incorporated: 1907
- Named for: Coal

Area
  - Total: 0.34 sq mi (0.87 km^{2})
  - Land: 0.34 sq mi (0.87 km^{2})
  - Water: 0 sq mi (0.00 km^{2})
- Elevation: 906 ft (276 m)

Population (2020)
  - Total: 154
  - Density: 460/sq mi (180/km^{2})
- Time zone: UTC-6 (CST)
  - Summer (DST): UTC-5 (CDT)
- ZIP Code: 66782
- Area code: 620
- FIPS code: 20-77150
- GNIS ID: 2397270
- Website: cityofwestmineral.org

West Mineral is a city in Cherokee County, Kansas, United States. As of the 2020 census, the population of the city was 154. It is the home of Big Brutus, the second largest electric shovel in the world.

== History ==
West Mineral was named from the coal mines found there. A post office was established in West Mineral in 1899.

== Geography ==
According to the United States Census Bureau, the city has a total area of 0.34 square miles (0.88 km^{2}), all land.

== Demographics ==
Historical population
Census	Pop.	Note	%±
1910	1,770		—
1920	938		−47.0%
1930	491		−47.7%
1940	486		−1.0%
1950	349		−28.2%
1960	262		−24.9%
1970	232		−11.5%
1980	229		−1.3%
1990	226		−1.3%
2000	243		7.5%
2010	185		−23.9%
2020	154		−16.8%
U.S. Decennial Census

=== 2010 census ===
As of the census of 2010, there were 185 people, 81 households, and 49 families living in the city. The population density was 544.1 inhabitants per square mile (210.1/km^{2}). There were 95 housing units at an average density of 279.4 per square mile (107.9/km^{2}). The racial makeup of the city was 93.5% White, 1.6% Native American, and 4.9% from two or more races. Hispanic or Latino of any race were 2.2% of the population.

There were 81 households, of which 30.9% had children under the age of 18 living with them, 44.4% were married couples living together, 9.9% had a female householder with no husband present, 6.2% had a male householder with no wife present, and 39.5% were non-families. 38.3% of all households were made up of individuals, and 14.8% had someone living alone who was 65 years of age or older. The average household size was 2.28 and the average family size was 2.96.

The median age in the city was 40.1 years. 23.8% of residents were under the age of 18; 8.6% were between the ages of 18 and 24; 26.4% were from 25 to 44; 25.4% were from 45 to 64; and 15.7% were 65 years of age or older. The gender makeup of the city was 49.2% male and 50.8% female.

=== 2000 census ===
As of the census of 2000, there were 243 people, 100 households, and 73 families living in the city. The population density was 709.2 inhabitants per square mile (273.8/km^{2}). There were 121 housing units at an average density of 353.2 per square mile (136.4/km^{2}). The racial makeup of the city was 96.30% White, 2.06% Native American, and 1.65% from two or more races. Hispanic or Latino of any race were 2.47% of the population.

There were 100 households, out of which 28.0% had children under the age of 18 living with them, 54.0% were married couples living together, 13.0% had a female householder with no husband present, and 27.0% were non-families. 23.0% of all households were made up of individuals, and 16.0% had someone living alone who was 65 years of age or older. The average household size was 2.43 and the average family size was 2.82.

In the city, the population was spread out, with 25.1% under the age of 18, 7.8% from 18 to 24, 28.8% from 25 to 44, 24.3% from 45 to 64, and 14.0% who were 65 years of age or older. The median age was 36 years. For every 100 females, there were 97.6 males. For every 100 females age 18 and over, there were 97.8 males.

The median income for a household in the city was $31,042, and the median income for a family was $40,000. Males had a median income of $28,036 versus $22,500 for females. The per capita income for the city was $15,176. About 8.3% of families and 15.4% of the population were below the poverty line, including 16.7% of those under the age of eighteen and 8.3% of those 65 or over.

== Education ==
West Mineral is served by USD 247 Southeast.

The West Mineral School was closed through school unification. The Elementary and Junior High mascot was the Wildcat with school colors of purple and gold. When the school serviced upper grade levels, the West Mineral High School mascot was Crusaders.

== Notable person ==
- Orval Grove, Major League Baseball pitcher
