= Scammon, Kansas =

City in Cherokee County, Kansas

- City
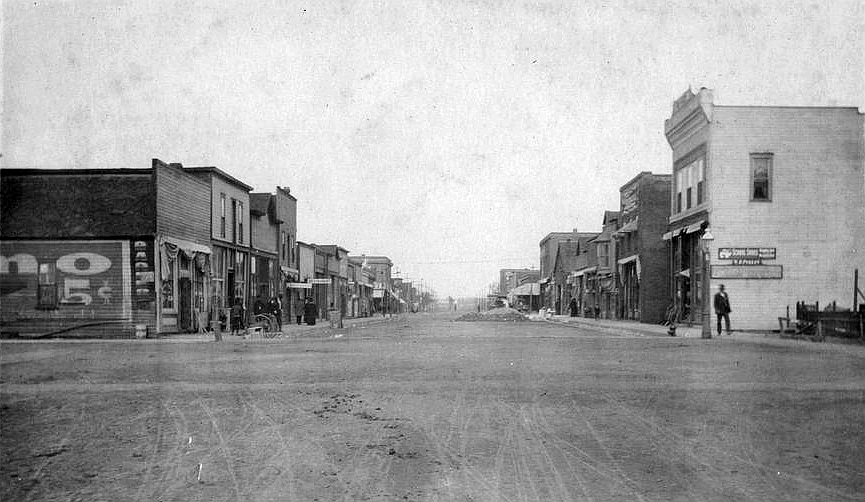
- Scammon, circa 1900–1910

- Location within Cherokee County and Kansas

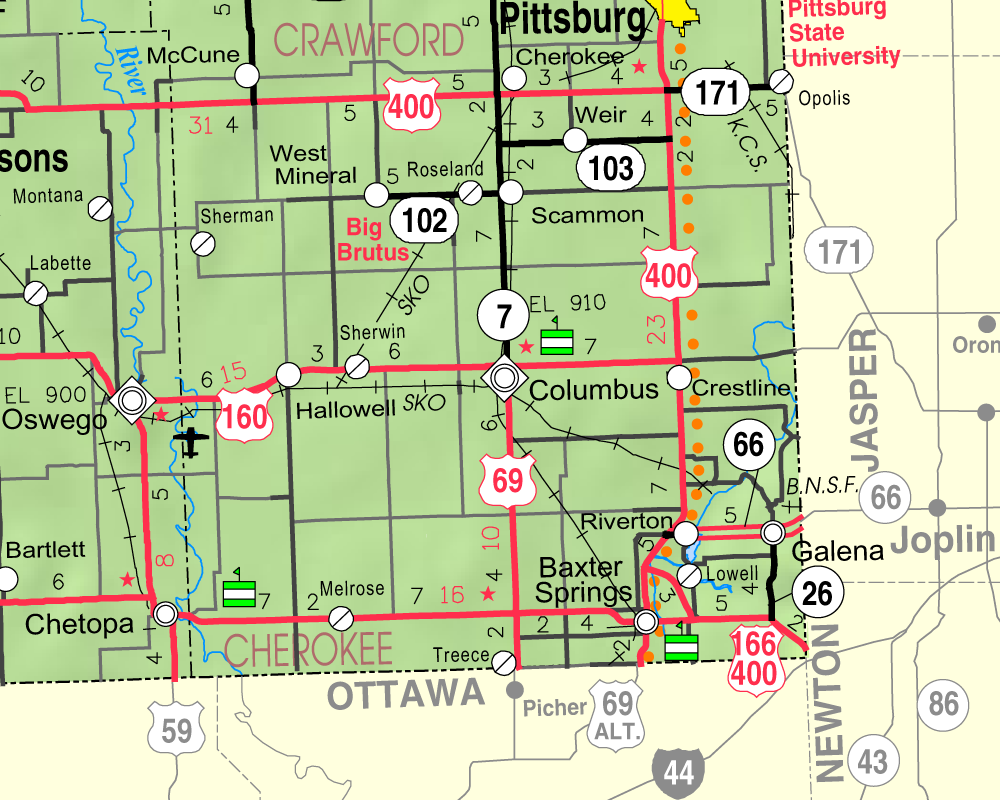
- KDOT map of Cherokee County (legend)
- Coordinates: 37°16′41″N 94°49′23″W
- Country: United States
- State: Kansas
- County: Cherokee
- Founded: 1884
- Platted: 1884
- Incorporated: 1888
- Named for: Scammon brothers

Government
  - Mayor: Jerry Grant

Area
  - Total: 0.63 sq mi (1.63 km^{2})
  - Land: 0.63 sq mi (1.62 km^{2})
  - Water: 0.0039 sq mi (0.01 km^{2})
- Elevation: 906 ft (276 m)

Population (2020)
  - Total: 376
  - Density: 601/sq mi (232/km^{2})
- Time zone: UTC-6 (CST)
  - Summer (DST): UTC-5 (CDT)
- ZIP Code: 66773
- Area code: 620
- FIPS code: 20-63325
- GNIS ID: 485650
- Website: City website

Scammon is a city in Cherokee County, Kansas, United States. As of the 2020 census, the population of the city was 376.

== History ==
Scammon was laid out in 1884. It was named for the four Scammon brothers, who operated the first mine there. David Mackie (1836–1910) was a founder and builder of Scammon, and the first President of the Scammon State Bank. The community was known as Stilson when it was first settled. The town was known as Scammonville for a short time before adopting the current name.

The first post office at Scammonville, established in 1879, was renamed Scammon in 1890.

The local railroad history group Heart of the Heartlands, based in Scammon and nearby unincorporated Carona, has restored the old Carona depot as a museum.

== Geography ==
According to the United States Census Bureau, the city has a total area of 0.64 square miles (1.66 km^{2}), all land.

== Demographics ==
Historical population
Census	Pop.	Note	%±
1890	748		—
1900	1,549		107.1%
1910	2,233		44.2%
1920	1,694		−24.1%
1930	1,093		−35.5%
1940	737		−32.6%
1950	561		−23.9%
1960	429		−23.5%
1970	457		6.5%
1980	501		9.6%
1990	466		−7.0%
2000	496		6.4%
2010	482		−2.8%
2020	376		−22.0%
U.S. Decennial Census

=== 2010 census ===
As of the census of 2010, there were 482 people, 192 households, and 128 families living in the city. The population density was 753.1 inhabitants per square mile (290.8/km^{2}). There were 219 housing units at an average density of 342.2 per square mile (132.1/km^{2}). The racial makeup of the city was 94.8% White, 0.8% Native American, 0.8% Asian, 1.0% from other races, and 2.5% from two or more races. Hispanic or Latino of any race were 1.5% of the population.

There were 192 households, of which 37.5% had children under the age of 18 living with them, 51.6% were married couples living together, 11.5% had a female householder with no husband present, 3.6% had a male householder with no wife present, and 33.3% were non-families. 26.6% of all households were made up of individuals, and 8.8% had someone living alone who was 65 years of age or older. The average household size was 2.51 and the average family size was 3.09.

The median age in the city was 39.6 years. 27.2% of residents were under the age of 18; 8.6% were between the ages of 18 and 24; 23.6% were from 25 to 44; 27.5% were from 45 to 64; and 12.9% were 65 years of age or older. The gender makeup of the city was 48.8% male and 51.2% female.

=== 2000 census ===
As of the census of 2000, there were 496 people, 192 households, and 139 families living in the city. The population density was 782.4 inhabitants per square mile (302.1/km^{2}). There were 222 housing units at an average density of 350.2 per square mile (135.2/km^{2}). The racial makeup of the city was 93.75% White, 0.60% African American, 2.42% Native American, 0.60% Asian, and 2.62% from two or more races. Hispanic or Latino of any race were 0.60% of the population.

There were 192 households, out of which 36.5% had children under the age of 18 living with them, 55.2% were married couples living together, 15.1% had a female householder with no husband present, and 27.6% were non-families. 26.6% of all households were made up of individuals, and 12.0% had someone living alone who was 65 years of age or older. The average household size was 2.58 and the average family size was 3.12.

In the city, the population was spread out, with 29.0% under the age of 18, 8.7% from 18 to 24, 29.4% from 25 to 44, 19.4% from 45 to 64, and 13.5% who were 65 years of age or older. The median age was 34 years. For every 100 females, there were 98.4 males. For every 100 females age 18 and over, there were 85.3 males.

The median income for a household in the city was $35,268, and the median income for a family was $37,708. Males had a median income of $29,219 versus $21,477 for females. The per capita income for the city was $15,926. About 11.3% of families and 12.8% of the population were below the poverty line, including 27.8% of those under age 18 and 4.1% of those age 65 or over.

== Notable people ==
- George Barr, umpire.
- Rube Ferns, boxer.
- Fred McMullin, baseball player involved in the Black Sox scandal.
