= National Register of Historic Places listings in Cherokee County, Kansas =

Location of Cherokee County in Kansas

This is a list of the National Register of Historic Places listings in Cherokee County, Kansas.

This is intended to be a complete list of the properties and districts on the National Register of Historic Places in Cherokee County, Kansas, United States. The locations of National Register properties and districts for which the latitude and longitude coordinates are included below, may be seen in a map.

There are 12 properties and districts listed on the National Register in the county.

This National Park Service list is complete through NPS recent listings posted September 4, 2026.

== Current listings ==
	Name on the Register	Image	Date listed	Location	City or town	Description
1	Baxter Springs High School		August 8, 2014 (#14000479)	1520 Cleveland Ave. 37°01′12″N 94°43′58″W	Baxter Springs	Now the middle school?
2	Baxter Springs Independent Oil and Gas Service Station	Baxter Springs Independent Oil and Gas Service Station	August 29, 2003 (#03000841)	940 Military Ave. 37°01′33″N 94°44′05″W	Baxter Springs	
3	Big Brutus	Big Brutus	January 5, 2018 (#100001945)	6509 NW 60th St. 37°16′26″N 94°56′20″W	West Mineral	A very large electric shovel.
4	Brush Creek Bridge	Brush Creek Bridge	March 10, 1983 (#83000419)	North of Baxter Springs; 37°04′24″N 94°44′26″W	Baxter Springs	Only surviving Marsh arch bridge on the entire length of the former U.S. Route 66 highway (this section is now a county highway)
5	Columbus Public Carnegie Library	Columbus Public Carnegie Library	June 25, 1987 (#87000932)	205 N. Kansas; 37°10′22″N 94°50′36″W	Columbus	
6	Johnston Library	Johnston Library	November 21, 1976 (#76000817)	210 W. 10th St. 37°01′35″N 94°44′12″W	Baxter Springs	
7	Kansas Route 66 Historic District-East Galena	Kansas Route 66 Historic District-East Galena	August 29, 2003 (#03000842)	U.S. Route 66; 37°05′05″N 94°37′43″W	Galena	Includes part of U.S. Route 66 in Kansas
8	Kansas Route 66 Historic District-North Baxter Springs		April 14, 2015 (#15000141)	N. Willow Ave., SE. 50th St.; also SE. Beasley Rd. 37°02′14″N 94°44′26″W	Baxter Springs	Second set of addresses represent a boundary increase listed January 11, 2017
9	Rial A. Niles House	Rial A. Niles House	September 6, 2006 (#06000772)	605 E. 12th St. 37°01′24″N 94°43′43″W	Baxter Springs	
10	Edgar Backus Schermerhorn House	Edgar Backus Schermerhorn House	August 21, 1989 (#89001146)	803 E. 5th St. 37°04′35″N 94°37′53″W	Galena	
11	Soffietti-Boccia Grocery Store		March 27, 2017 (#100000793)	313 Fleming St. 37°17′03″N 94°55′45″W	West Mineral	
12	Williams' Store	Williams' Store	August 29, 2003 (#03000843)	7109 SE U.S. Route 66; 37°04′30″N 94°42′10″W	Riverton	Now known as Eisler Brothers Old Riverton Store.

== See also ==
- List of National Historic Landmarks in Kansas
- National Register of Historic Places listings in Kansas
