= Indian Home Guard Camp (Baxter Springs) =

In June 1862 two Union camps were established in the vicinity of what is today Baxter Springs, Kansas. One was Camp Hunter, located in what is now the center of the town. The other was the Indian Home Guard Camp, located at Little Five Mile Creek, 1½ miles southeast of Camp Hunter.

The area where the Indian camp was located was flat ground. Little is known about the camp. Hugh Thompson, who was stationed as a scout in the area, said 6,000 men were stationed between the Indian camp and Camp Hunter in June 1862. The 2nd Regiment of the Indian Home Guard was organized there and placed under the command of Col. John Ritchie. This regiment was organized from June 22 to July 18. It took so long to organize because of various political disagreements amongst the government negotiators.

The camps at Baxter Springs were established with three goals in mind. One was to escort wagon trains heading south into Indian Territory, as much of that entity was held by Indians owing loyalty to the Confederacy. Therefore, wagon trains traveling through the Indian Territory were in danger of being attacked.

A second goal was to provide a good place to rest tired cavalry horses. There was much tall native prairie grass just west of the camps. The troops in the camps were needed to guard the resting horses.

A third goal was to have troops in the area to contest the activities of Bushwhackers and Confederate Indians who operated in the area.

As soon as both camps were established, action was taken to uproot a guerrilla camp commanded by Capt. Thomas Livingston. The camp was overrun, but Livingston and his men escaped. Further attempts to capture or destroy the guerrilla force ended in failure. When attacked, the guerrillas would disappear. It was discovered after the Civil War they had a hidden camp on the border with Missouri. (See Livingston's Hideout.)

The white soldiers were at first skeptical of the abilities of the Home Guards. They wore mismatched uniforms and wore stovepipe hats, looking little like soldiers. Their ponies were so small the riders' feet almost touched the ground when they rode. Someone said it appeared the Indians were walking as they were riding. However, the Indians proved themselves well in battle. Their ponies proved useful, as they were well adapted to the summer heat and did not wear out, as did many of the larger horses of the white troops.

In early September Camp Hunter and the Indian Home Guard camp found themselves on the front line. The soldiers were warned of an approaching Confederate regiment. Both camps were quickly abandoned. Camp Hunter was briefly occupied by the Confederate force. After the Confederate force and possibly other Confederates shortly later passed through, neither camp was used again.
