= Fort Baxter =

Fort Baxter may refer to:

- Fort Baxter (Kansas) a former US Army fort near Baxter Springs, also called Fort Blair
- A fictional military base which was the setting of the first three seasons of The Phil Silvers Show, and the comedy film Sgt Bilko (1996)
- A military base in Vice City, a fictional city in the Grand Theft Auto video game series.
