= Camp Ben Butler =

In early May 1863 a temporary camp, Camp Hooker, was established at the site of what later became Baxter Springs, Kansas. This area was located in what was known as the Cherokee Strip (Kansas). In late May while the camp commander, Col. James M. Williams, was in Fort Scott, the troops moved the camp three blocks to the east to what is now Washington School Hill. The new camp, Camp Ben Butler (named after Maj. Gen. Benjamin Butler, was in a highly defendable position. It occupied a plateau that covered more than two square blocks. Only a small area to the south allowed easy access to camp. In fact, much of the surrounding area was practically impenetrable by men or horses.

The wisdom of the move became quickly apparent. Before Col. Williams returned to his post, Confederate guerrillas under Maj. Thomas R. Livingston engaged the small Union force two miles from Camp Ben Butler.

On June 22 the camp was sent additional troops. It seemed Livingston and Confederate Indians planned joint operations in the area. Livingston, a recurring worry to Union forces in the area, was killed in a fight at Stockton, Missouri, the next month.

In late July 1863, a force of men under First Lt. Jason B. Bond began building a new fort a short distance away, Fort Blair (Fort Baxter (Kansas)). This new fort was completed in August and the troops moved from Camp Ben Butler to Fort Blair.

On October 6 400 guerrillas under William C. Quantrill attacked Fort Blair and then attacked an approaching column of troops commanded by Maj. Gen. James Blunt. Blunt's force was decimated and many of his troops were murdered when they attempted to surrender.

After the attack the troops stationed at Fort Blair and the survivors from Blunt's force moved into Camp Ben Butler. When word of the massacre reached Fort Scott, at least five companies of troops were sent to reinforce Baxter Springs. Soon after they arrived, they and Blunt's men returned to Fort Scott.

On October 20, the rest of the troops were ordered back to Fort Scott. Everything not taken from Camp Ben Butler and Fort Blair was destroyed and burned. Baxter Springs was not again used as a military post.
