= Plays-in-the-Park =

Amphitheater in Edison, New Jersey

Coordinates: 40.5428°N 74.3391°W

Stephen J. Capestro Theatre
- Interactive map of Stephen J. Capestro Theatre
- Address: 1 Pine Dr, Edison, NJ 08817; Edison; USA
- Type: Opera House; Local Productions; Musicals

Construction
- Opened: 1978

Plays-in-the-Park is a government-sponsored outdoor amphitheater located in Edison, New Jersey. Middlesex County's Plays-in-the-Park has been in existence since 1963. Generally, three full-scale musical productions run in the summer, from June to August. In the fall, the theater is transformed into a black box where the annual children's show takes place; the indoor children's musical tradition began in 1992. In the winter, Plays-in-the-Park uses the State Theater in New Brunswick, NJ to put on their final show of the season. Plays-in-the-Park has been using the State Theater for their annual production of Joseph and the Amazing Technicolor Dreamcoat since 1994.

== History ==
In 1963, community theater volunteers contacted the Middlesex County Board of Chosen Freeholders asking for financial support in their endeavor to find a space to produce shows in the summer months. With only enough funding budgeted to construct a storage shed, a compromise was met. In the summer, the shed would be used as a theater, and in the winter it would be used for storage. A grove in Roosevelt Park was chosen as the site, and Plays-in-the-Park opened in 1963. Since then, the theater has become an integral part of the community, especially during the summer months. It is now a permanent structure with dressing rooms and a scenic shop.

However, on July 24, 1975, a garbage-can fire destroyed the theater during the run of Man of La Mancha. The next day reconstruction began, and mobile trailers were brought in to finish the run of the show and the rest of the season. A new amphitheater, the Stephen J. Capestro Theatre, was opened in 1978 thanks to funding from the County and the Green Acres Commission.

The theater is staffed by working theater professionals and features some of the latest sound and lighting equipment. Since 1978, it is estimated that over one million people have attended Plays-in-the-Park performances.

== Performances ==
1975: Li'l Abner, Man of La Mancha, Peter Pan 1997: Guys and Dolls, The Pirates of Penzance, Music Man, Arsenic and Old Lace
2010: 1776, The Wedding Singer, High School Musical
2011: Annie, Hairspray, Godspell
2012: My Fair Lady, Damn Yankees, Grease
2013: Les Misérables, Spamalot, Xanadu
2014: Sunset Boulevard, Shrek the Musical, Bye Bye Birdie
2015: Oklahoma!, Young Frankenstein, Jesus Christ Superstar
2016: The Little Mermaid, Sister Act, South Pacific
2017: Legally Blonde, West Side Story, Mary Poppins
2018: Fiddler on the Roof, Mamma Mia, You're A Good Man, Charlie Brown
2019: Evita, Newsies the musical, The Addams Family
2020: Traditional live stage performances cancelled due to coronavirus pandemic (COVID-19)
Limited alternative virtual programming was provided.
2021: America The Beautiful, Rock, Roll and Soul Showtune: The Music of Jerry Herman
2022: Something Rotten!, The SpongeBob Musical, A Chorus Line
2023: Rock of Ages, Ain't Misbehavin', Cinderella
2024: Beauty and the Beast, In the Heights, A Funny Thing Happened on the Way to the Forum
2025: Beautiful: The Carole King Musical, RENT, Grease

== Community and Accessibility ==
Plays-in-the-Park has received attention and praise for its high production value. It also provides the community with the children's theater camp, Kids-in-the-Park, every summer. Children ages 8 through 15 are admitted. In a small-scale amphitheater located in Warren Park, NJ, a total of 250 children attend two workshops and put on performances at the end of the sessions. Plays-in-the-Park also has a relationship with the Cerebral Palsy Institute. Before the federal legislation made wheel-chair access mandatory, Plays-in-the-Park's outdoor setting offered barrier-free entry. Sign Language Interpretation, Audio Description, Sensory Seminars and Open Captioning are all used at specific performances for every run of a show.

== Location ==
Plays-in-the-Park is located in Roosevelt Park (Edison), at 1 Pine Drive, Edison, NJ, 08837.

== Performers and Staff ==
Many people who got their start at Plays-in-the-Park have gone on to have successful careers in entertainment. Some notable alumni include: Brittany Murphy, Michael Schweikardt (set design for the James Taylor Tour), Timothy Gleason (Phantom of the Opera, Broadway), Amy Toporek (Hairspray, the National Tour), Keirsten Kupiec (42nd Street), Broadway, Lorinda Haver (Gentlemen Prefer Blondes, Broadway), Andrew Hodge (Cats, Tour), Russell Fischer (Jersey Boys, Broadway), Billy Piscopo (Jesus Christ Superstar, Tour), Veronica Kuehn (Mamma Mia!, Broadway, Xanadu, Broadway), Susan Santoro (Cats, Broadway, A Chorus Line, Broadway), Coleen Sexton (Jekyll & Hyde, video), Casey Muha (Chicago, Tour, On the Town, Paper Mill Playhouse), Jenny Hill (Seussical, Broadway, Spamalot, Broadway) and Gerard Lebeda (Jesus Christ Superstar, European Tours).

The current artistic director is Margaret Davis (2019-present). Previous artistic directors were Gary P. Cohen (1993-2019) and founding artistic director Phyllis Elfenbein (1963-1993). Davis directs the opening show every summer as well as all the October children's musicals. Michelle Massa used to choreograph the first show each summer since the early 1990s and directed JOSEPH AND THE DREAMCOAT at the State Theatre New Brunswick for 25 years. Other permanent staff include David Griffin, Mike D'Arcy, Chris Cichon, Gabby Komleski, and Amanda Sorrento.
