= Roosevelt Park (Edison, New Jersey) =

Park in New Jersey, United States

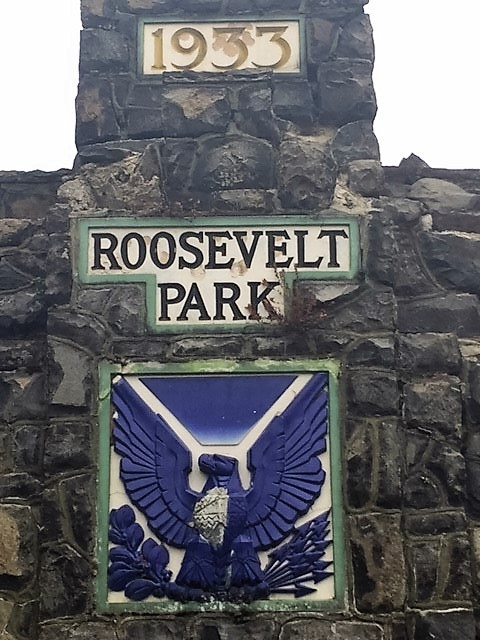
- Roosevelt Park stone monument (detail, top front)

- Location within Middlesex County, New Jersey Location within New Jersey
- Location: Edison, New Jersey, United States
- Coordinates: 40.555108°N 74.338409°W
- Area: 196 acres (79 ha)
- Created: 1933
- Operator: Middlesex County

Roosevelt Park is a 196-acre park located in central east Edison, New Jersey, at Parsonage Road and Route 1, just west of Menlo Park Mall. Established in 1933 in what was then Raritan Township, the park is considered the oldest park in the Middlesex County Park System. It is owned and operated by the county government.

== History ==
On July 5, 1917, the Middlesex County Board of Freeholders authorized the purchase of 208 acres of land in Raritan Township for the construction of a county hospital for tuberculosis patients. According to The Guide to Edison Township, the purchased land was "free of population and free from any kind of buildings. The closest people to it was one farmer and the nearest populated area was Downtown Metuchen". On April 7, 1919, NJ Assembly Bill 498, which sought to establish a bond to facilitate the funding of construction of the hospital, died in committee, leaving the prospects for a new hospital in doubt. There was discussion of selling the land purchased for a hospital. On October 10, 1923, the Middlesex County Recreation Association hosted a luncheon/meeting at the Hotel Klein in New Brunswick and received broad support from local agencies and state and local officials to create the county's first park on the lands once designated for the tuberculosis hospital. A fundraising campaign to construct a Kiddie Keep Well camp on part of the grounds of the new county park was conducted 7–14 September 1924.

The Middlesex County freeholders established Roosevelt Park with funding from the Emergency Relief Administration in 1933 and subsequent improvements through the Civilian Conservation Corps and the Works Progress Administration. Hundreds of CCC workers of the Second Corps Area (New York, Connecticut and New Jersey) trained at Camp Dix in the summers of 1934 and 1935 and were positioned at a camp seven miles west of Raritan train station, likely Raritan Arsenal. In particular, Company 1209 was trained by the US Army in forestry operations and worked in Raritan Township on CCC Project P-67 beginning August 8, 1935.

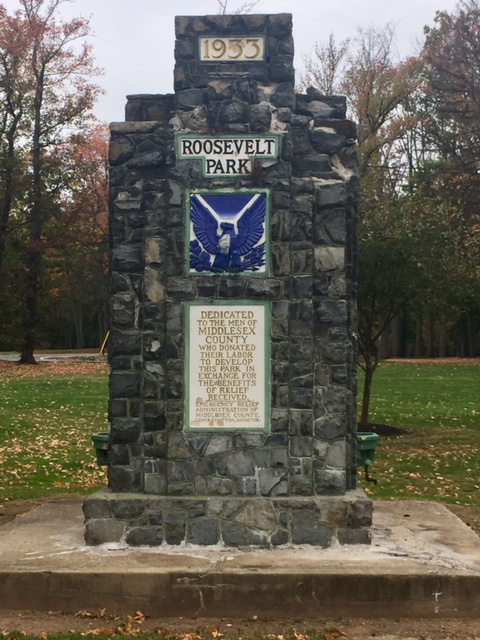
Roosevelt Park stone monument (front)

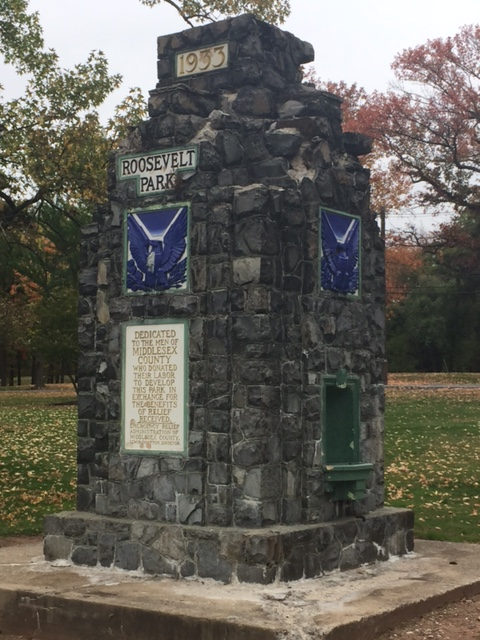
Roosevelt Park stone monument (side)

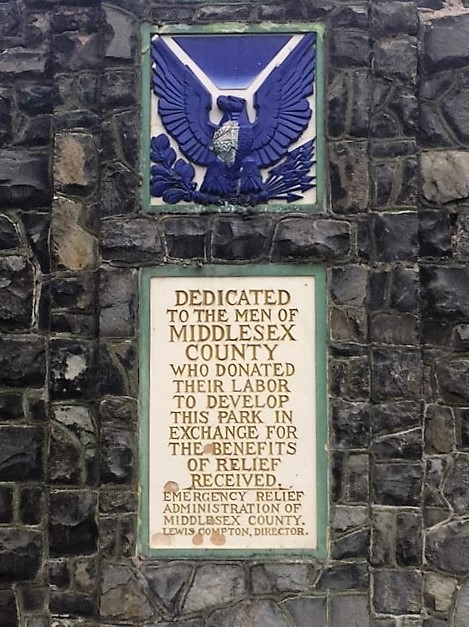
Roosevelt Park stone monument plaque on front

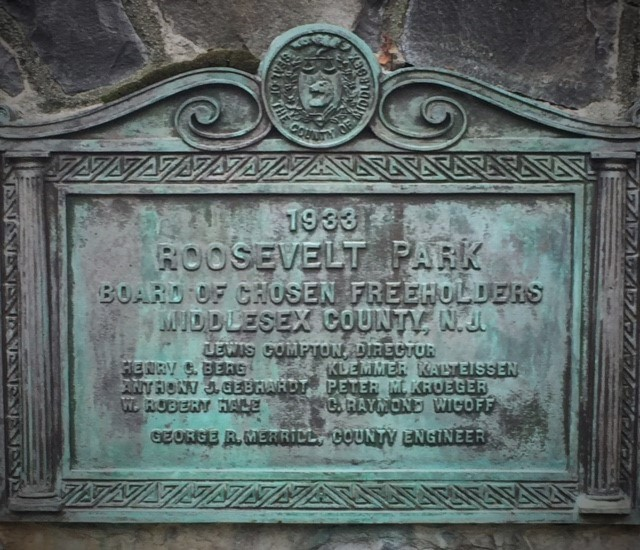
Roosevelt Park stone monument, plaque on back

The Middlesex County Board of Chosen Freeholders erected a large stone monument in 1933 dedicated to the park and the men of the county who built it. It is situated at the edge of the park along Route 1 North, just north of the Parsonage Road overpass, near the intersection of Lafayette Avenue and Roosevelt Drive.

- The front of the monument facing Route 1 has a plaque that reads: "Dedicated to the men of Middlesex County who donated their labors to develop this park in exchange for the benefits of relief received. - Emergency Relief Administration (ERA), Lewis Compton, Director."
- The back of the monument has a plaque that reads, "1933; Roosevelt Park; Board of Chosen Freeholders; Middlesex County, NJ; Lewis Compton, Director; Henry C Berg, Anthony J Gebhardt, W Robert Hale, Klemmer Kalteissen, Peter M Kroeger, C Raymond Wicoff; George R Merrill, County Engineer"

The county tuberculosis hospital—Roosevelt Hospital—was built adjacent to and overlooking the park. The county received $575,000 in federal funding through the Public Works Administration and construction began on May 3, 1935. The hospital was dedicated on October 31, 1936, and opened March 8, 1937. The hospital was added to the National Register of Historic Places in 2002.

Light Dispelling Darkness, a fountain designed by the sculptor Waylande Gregory, was sponsored by the WPA and unveiled in 1938. The theme of enlightenment through knowledge and science was inspired in part by the proximity of Menlo Park, where Thomas Edison invented the light bulb. The fountain is 15 feet high and 40 feet in diameter, with six symbolic groups representing "War", "Pestilence", "Famine", "Death", "Greed", and "Materialism". The fountain was restored in 2004 after falling into disrepair.

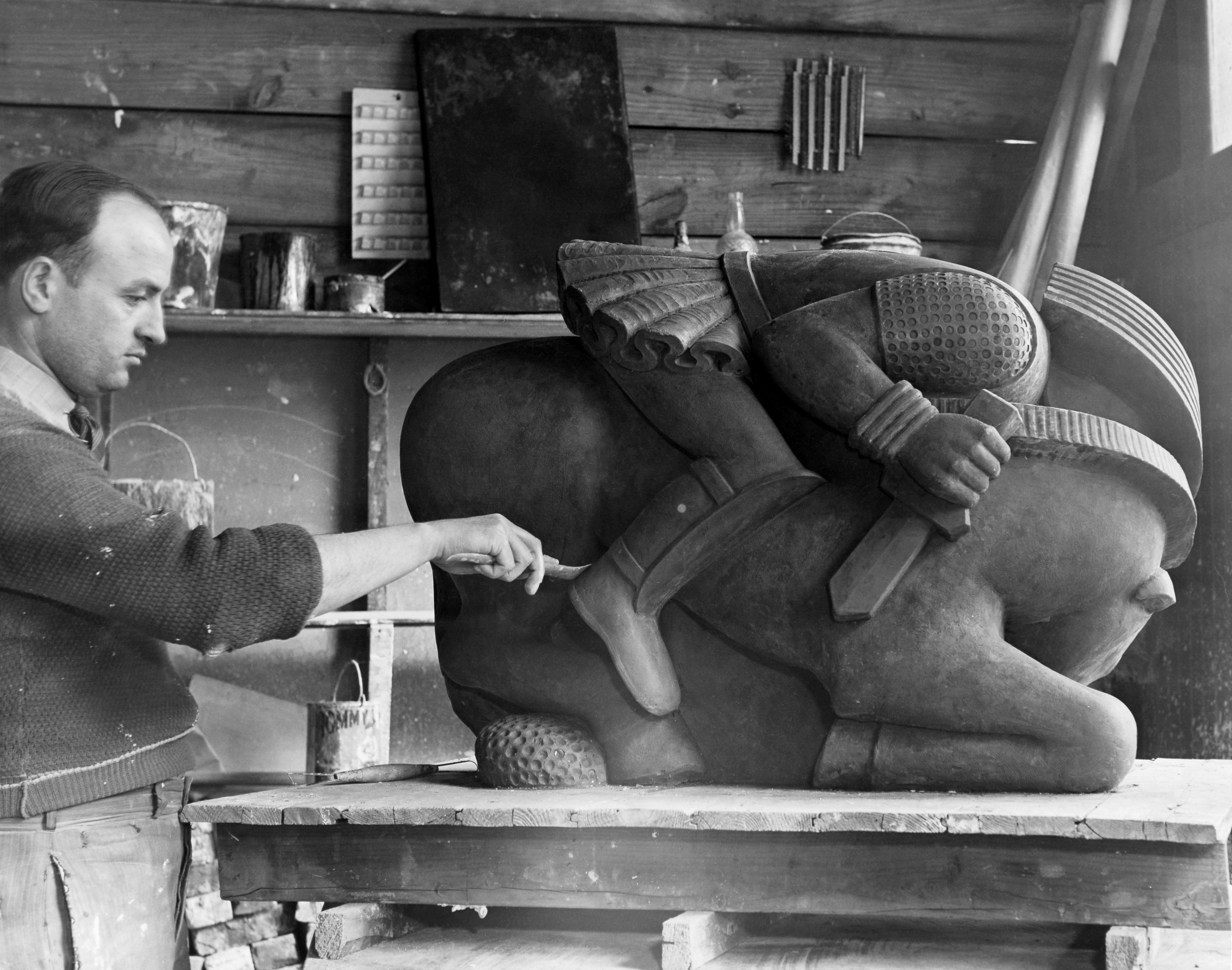
Waylande Gregory at work on Light Dispelling Darkness (1937)

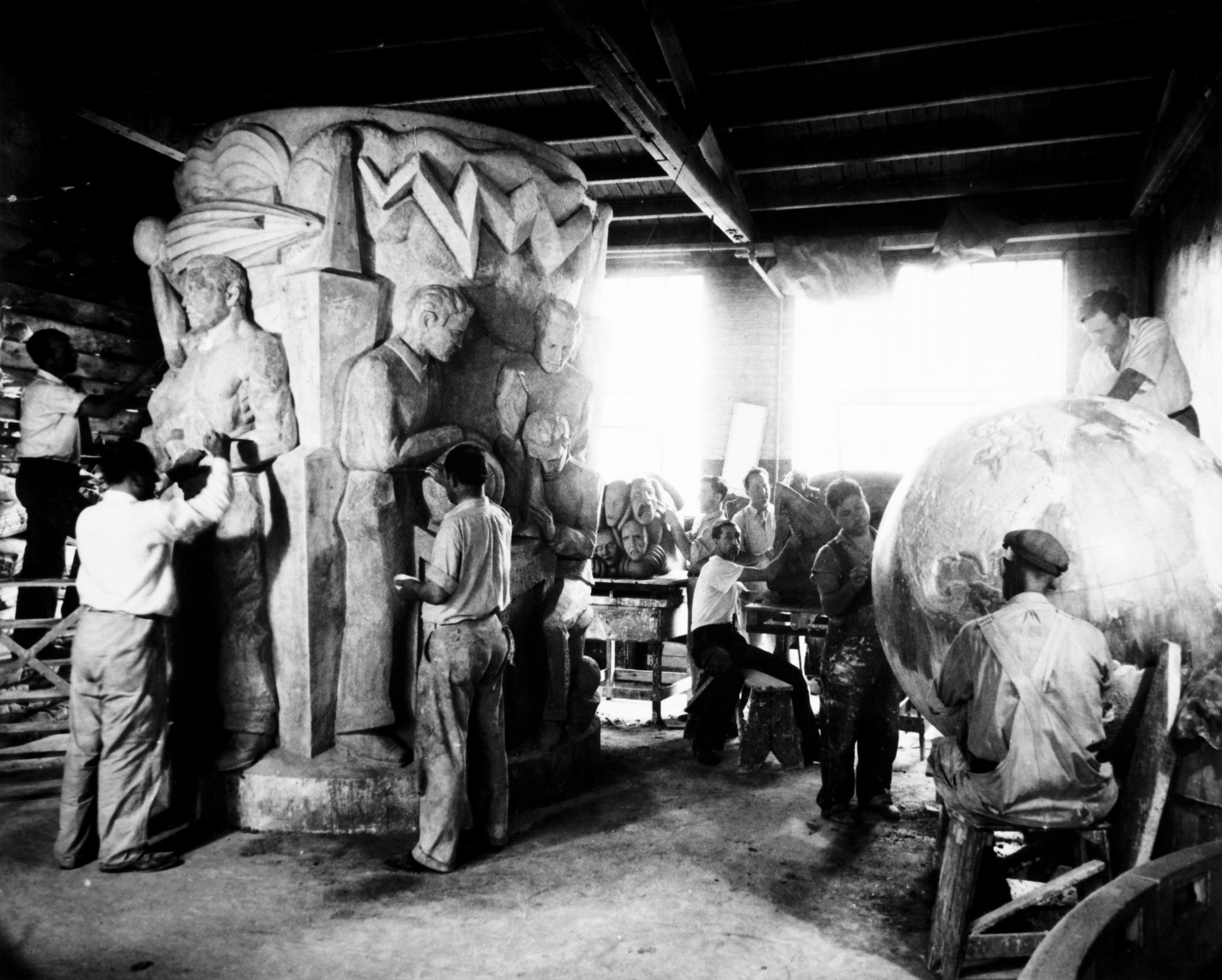
WPA artists working on Light Dispelling Darkness (1937)

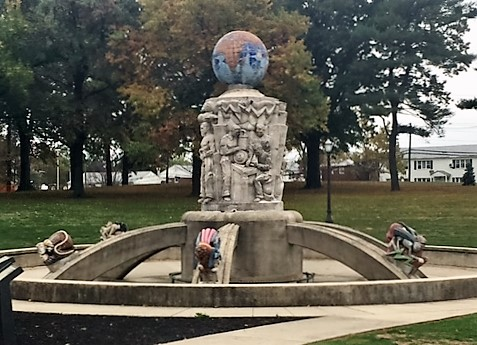
Light Dispelling Darkness in 2016

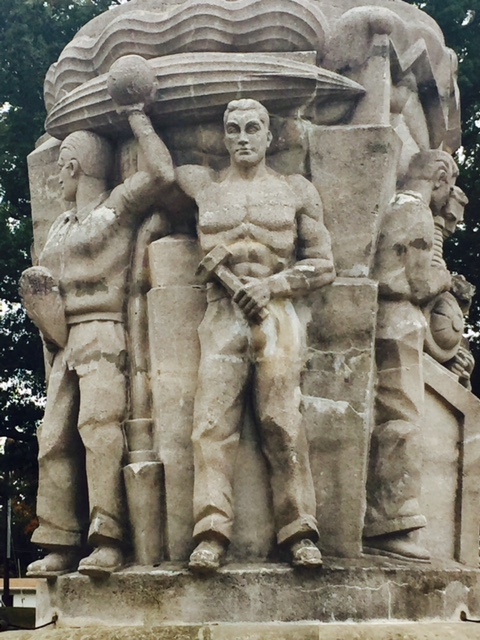
Light Dispelling Darkness (detail)

== Sports and recreation ==
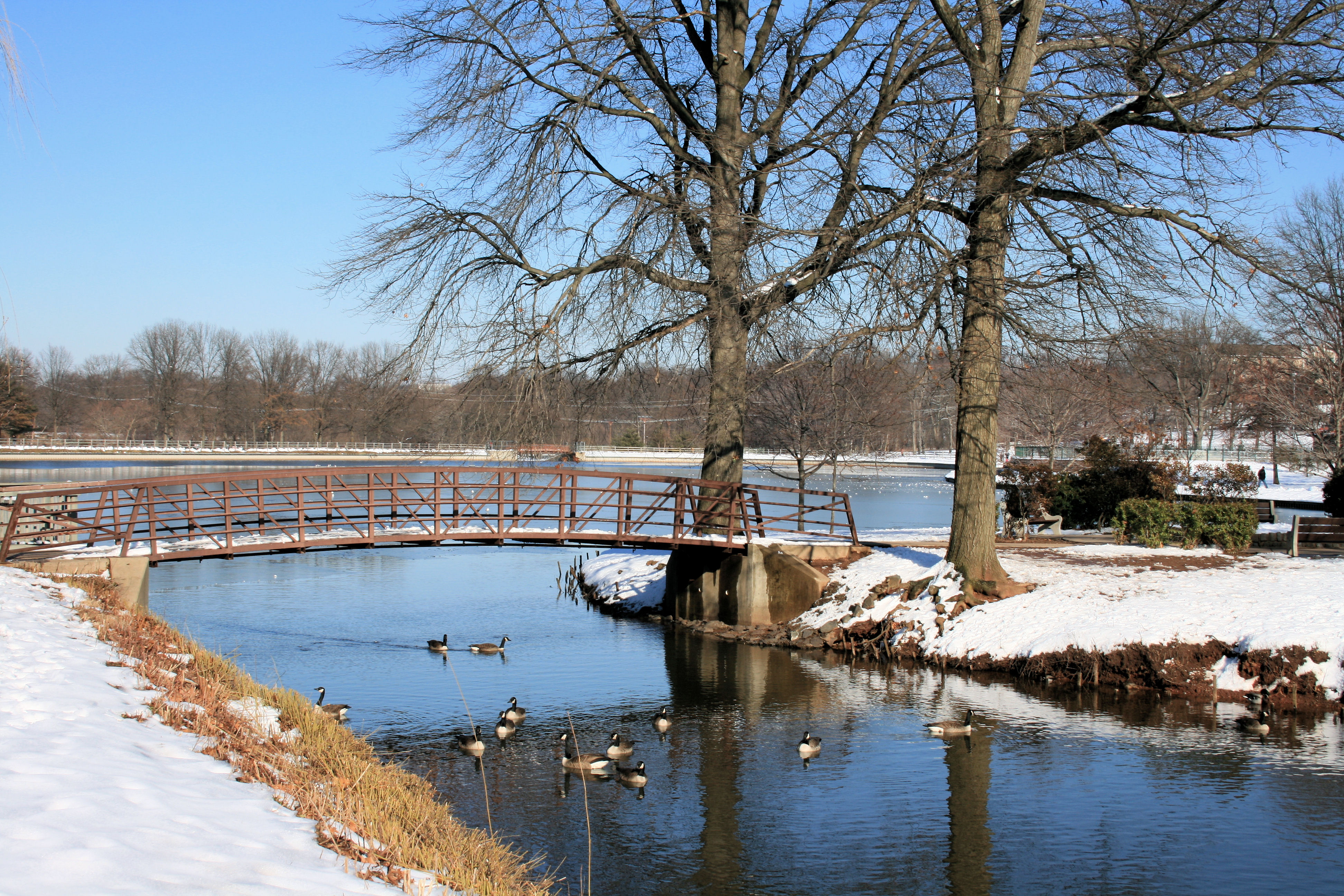
Winter in Roosevelt Park

The park provides a wide range of facilities for sports and recreation, including fields for baseball and soccer; picnic areas equipped with tables and barbecue grills; miles of trails for bicycling, hiking, walking and jogging, including multi station exercise equipment(Fitness trail); courts for basketball and tennis; fishing at an eight-acre man-made lake; and a rink for ice skating or roller skating, depending on the season.

"The Level Playing Fields" provides dedicated sports facilities for people with physical and other special needs, including a fully equipped artificial-turf diamond with backstop, dugouts, and grandstands for spectators.

The East Coast Greenway, a 3,000-mile-long system of trails connecting Maine and Florida, goes through the park.

== Arts and education ==
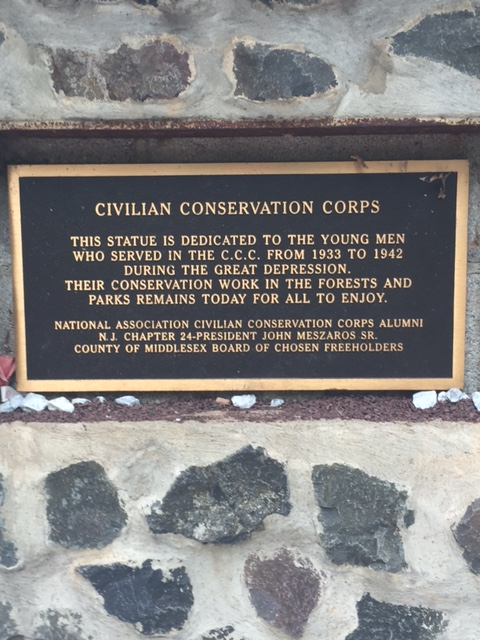
Plaque on "Iron Mike" monument (2003)

Chapter 24 of the National Association of Civilian Conservation Corps Alumni and the Middlesex County Board of Chosen Freeholders erected a monument dedicated on 31 March 2003 recognizing the work of the Civilian Conservation Corps (1933–1942). The statue, nicknamed "Iron Mike", is a representation of the typical CCC worker, spade in hand. It is situated on Lafayette Avenue near the corner of US Route 1 North and Grandview Avenue.

Two monuments dedicated to Marie Curie can be found on Elm Drive in the park, one erected in 1938 and the other in 1993.

The Middlesex County Veterans Memorial was unveiled on Veterans Day in November 2001. It consists of eight large concrete walls, six representing the various military services and two with dedications and memorials to the county's veterans, and a fountain with sculptures.

The Lakeview School and Rehabilitation Center for children with cerebral palsy is located within Roosevelt Park.

The Kiddie Keep Well Camp was established in 1924 to treat children with tuberculosis.

In the summer, the county sponsors various outdoor theater festivals, including "Plays in the Park" and "Music in the Park."

== Sources ==
- A Guide to Edison Township: Its History and Community Resources, by April Cormaci and Ian Durand (2004: Allegra Print and Imaging, Iselin, NJ), pp 43–48
- Welcome to Edison, by David C Sheehan (1991: Edison Township Historical Society, Edison, NJ), pg 96
- Edison: Images of America Series, by Stacy E Spies (2001:Arcadia Publishing, Charleston, SC), pp 75–84
- A Tuberculosis Directory, Containing a List of Institutions, Associations and Other Agencies Dealing With Tuberculosis in the United States and Canada, National Tuberculosis Association, 1916, pg 329
