= Johnston Library =

- U.S. National Register of Historic Places
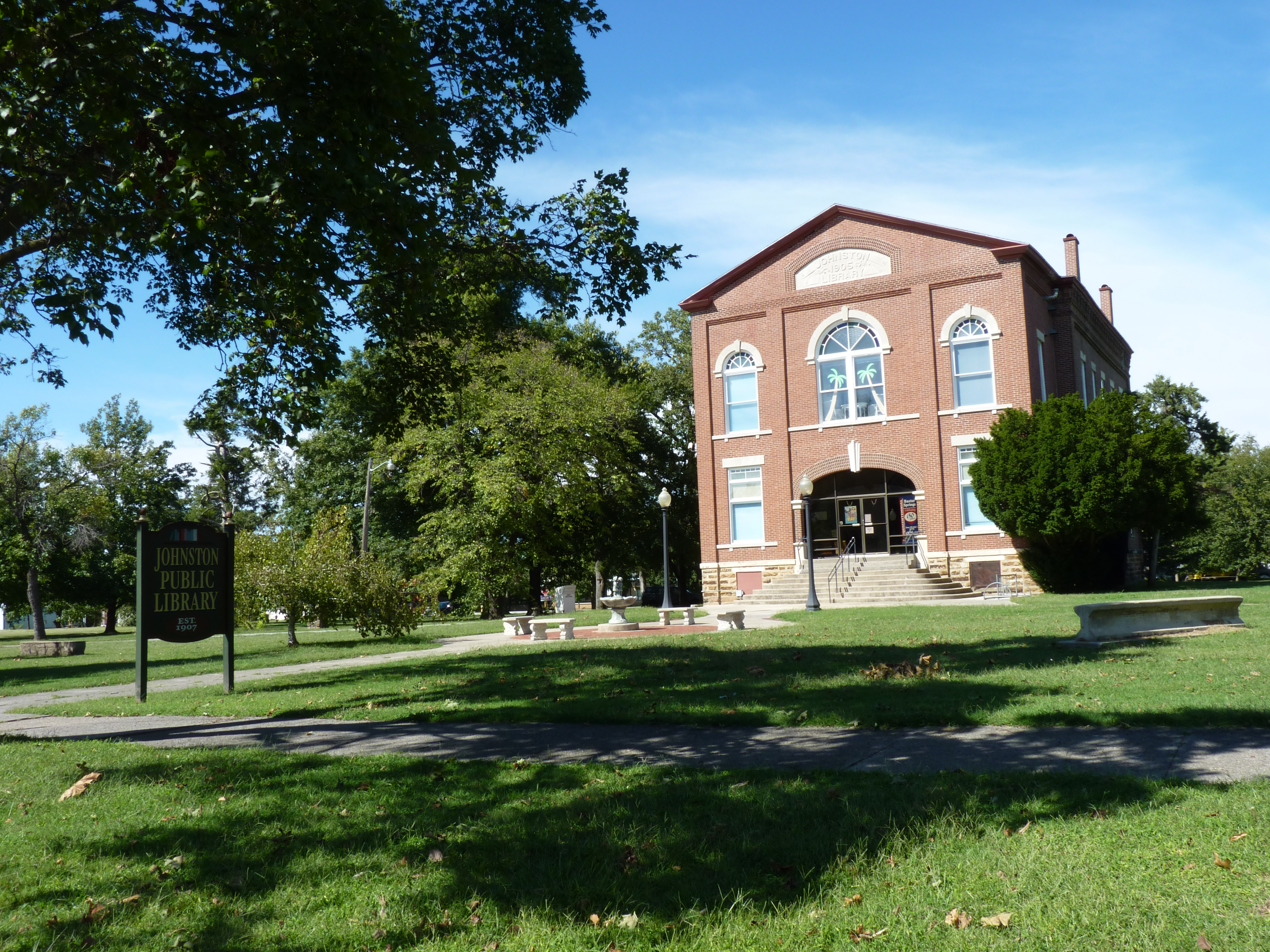

- Location within Kansas Location within the United States
- Location: 210 W. 10th St., Baxter Springs, Kansas
- Coordinates: 37°1′35″N 94°44′12″W
- Area: 2 acres (0.81 ha)
- Built: 1872
- Architectural style: Classical Revival, Richardsonian Romanesque
- NRHP reference No.: 76000817
- Added to NRHP: November 21, 1976

The Johnston Library is a historic library located at 210 W. 10th St. in Baxter Springs, Kansas. The building was constructed in 1872 to serve as a courthouse during Baxter Springs' unsuccessful attempt to become the Cherokee County seat. Though Baxter Springs had lost an election to choose the county seat in 1869 to Columbus, supporters of both cities had attempted to fraudulently swing the election in their favor, and Baxter Springs hoped it could still become county seat in the future. The building initially served as the county jail and sheriff's office until Columbus completed its jail in 1880. After this, Baxter Springs ultimately gave up its attempts to become the county seat, and the building became its city hall. In 1905, resident Niles P. Johnston bequeathed $5,000 to the city to start a library, and the city hall building was chosen to house it.

The two-story brick building's design is a mixture of the Classical Revival and Richardsonian Romanesque styles. Key features of both styles appear in the library's main entrance; its pediment and pilasters are typical Classical Revival elements, while the Syrian arch doorway is a Richardsonian Romanesque feature. The library also includes a gable roof and a cornice with ornamental corbels and brackets.

The library was added to the National Register of Historic Places on November 21, 1976.
