= Fort Baxter (Kansas) =

Coordinates: 37.0296°N 94.7339°W

Fort Baxter, also known as Fort Blair, was a small US Army post located in the southeast corner of Kansas near present-day Baxter Springs. This area was known as the Cherokee Strip. It was one of a few Kansas forts attacked by Confederate forces during the American Civil War. At one point the Confederate government claimed authority over the Neutral Lands. Both Union and Confederate troops operated in the area, as did guerrilla forces and militias prevalent in the Kansas-Missouri border area.

Fort Baxter was established during the war by Gen. James G. Blunt in May 1863. It was later described by the writer William E. Connelley as "consist[ing] of some log cabins with a total frontage of about 100 feet, facing east toward Spring river. Back of the fort, and of the same width, was a large space enclosed by embankments of earth thrown up against logs and about 4 feet high." The west wall of the embankment was torn out on October 5, 1863, to extend the north and south walls some 200 yards farther west. While still unfinished, the fort was attacked by Quantrill's raiders the next day, while about 60 men were out foraging on the prairie.

They had happened on to some Union forces while on the way to winter camp in Texas. The Union garrison, about 25 white cavalry and 65-70 infantry men of the United States Colored Troops defended the fort. Quantrill moved his men against the Union force led by Blunt out on the prairie, who was transferring a detachment from Fort Scott east to Fort Smith, Arkansas. Quantrill's guerrillas outnumbered the Union forces and killed most of them, a total of 103 men. Blunt and a few cavalry survived and escaped back to Fort Baxter.

After the massacre of Blunt's force, Quantrill withdrew and continued to Texas. The troops stationed at Fort Blair and the survivors of Blunt's force moved away from Fort Baxter and into Camp Ben Butler. They buried most of the dead from both sides in mass graves.

When word of Blunt's defeat reached Fort Scott, Kansas, five companies of US troops were sent to temporarily reinforce Baxter Springs. But on October 20, 1863, the troops in Baxter Springs were ordered to abandon the area and return to the better-fortified Fort Scott. They destroyed and burned everything they could not take with them, and the US Army abandoned Fort Baxter as a military post.

== See also ==
- Kansas Forts and Posts
- Camp Ben Butler.
