= Baxter Springs Independent Oil and Gas Service Station =

- U.S. National Register of Historic Places
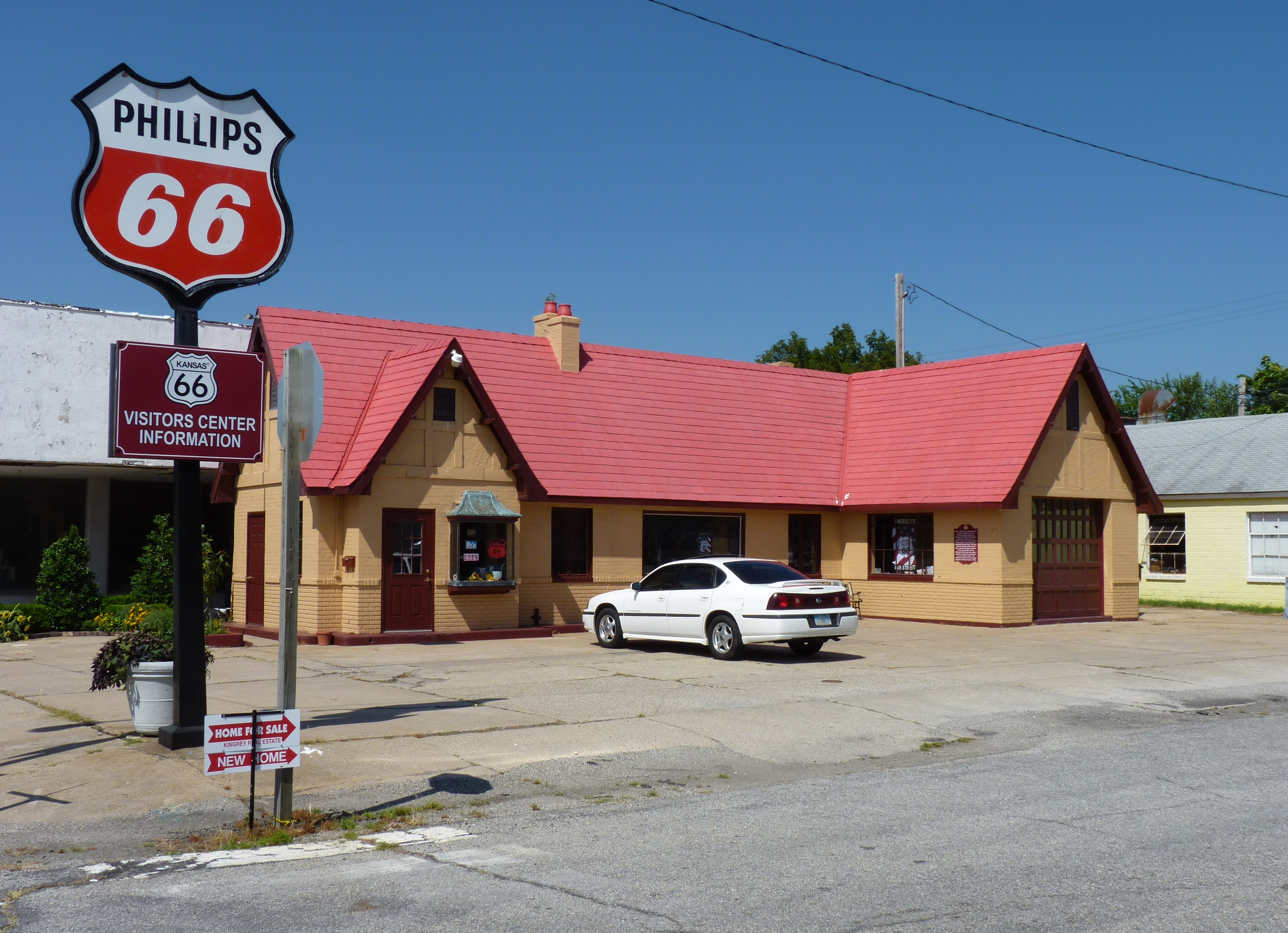

- Location within Kansas Location within the United States
- Location: 940 Military Ave., Baxter Springs, Kansas
- Coordinates: 37°1′33″N 94°44′5″W
- Area: less than one acre
- Built: 1930
- Architectural style: Tudor Revival
- MPS: Route 66 in Kansas MPS
- NRHP reference No.: 03000841
- Added to NRHP: August 29, 2003

The Baxter Springs Independent Oil and Gas Service Station is a historic gas station located at 940 Military Avenue in Baxter Springs, Kansas, along the former route of U.S. Route 66. The station was built in 1930 by the Independent Oil and Gas Company; the company merged with Phillips Petroleum the following year, and the station became a Phillips 66 station. The station was designed in the Tudor Revival style so to resemble a small cottage; this style was popular among gas stations at the time, as oil companies wanted their stations to fit in with nearby residential architecture. An addition which served as an auto repair shop was added to the station between 1930 and 1942. Phillips operated the station until 1958, and it continued to sell gasoline until the 1970s. The building now serves as the Kansas Route 66 Visitors Center.

The station was added to the National Register of Historic Places on August 29, 2003.
