= Rial A. Niles House =

Historic house in Kansas, United States

- U.S. National Register of Historic Places
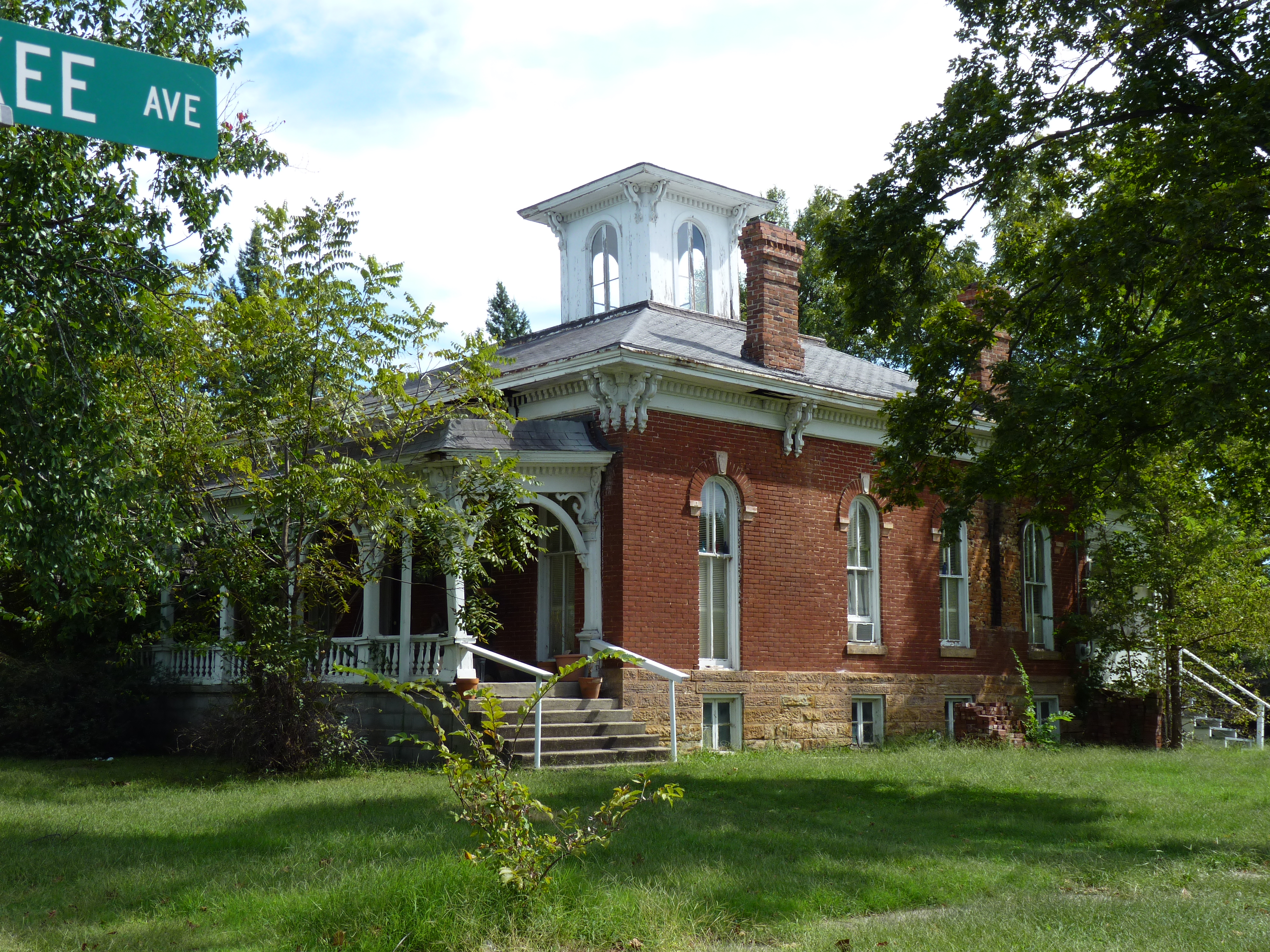

- Location within Kansas Location within the United States
- Location: 605 E. 12th St., Baxter Springs, Kansas
- Coordinates: 37°1′24″N 94°43′43″W
- Area: less than one acre
- Built: 1870
- Built by: Rakestraw, Allen
- Architectural style: Italianate
- NRHP reference No.: 06000772
- Added to NRHP: September 6, 2006

The Rial A. Niles House is a historic house at 605 E. 12th Street in Baxter Springs, Kansas, United States. The house was built in 1870 for Rial A. Niles, a local businessman, and his wife. The house was designed in the Italianate style and features a hip roof with a cupola, a front porch with decorative wooden posts and arches, and four brick chimneys. After Niles went bankrupt, Colonel William March, an officer in the Union Army and two-time Baxter Springs postmaster, bought the house in 1875. March lost the house after his wife's death in 1902, and it passed through a number of tenants until the 1930s. In 1938, the Baxter Springs Women's Club rented the house, which it used for meetings and social gatherings until it disbanded in 1956. The house was then purchased by the local Episcopal congregation and became St. Mark's Episcopal Church until the congregation also disbanded in 1977. The house has since reverted to its previous use as a residence.

The house was added to the National Register of Historic Places on September 6, 2006.

The house underwent a major renovation from 2020-2023 to save the property and restore it to period accuracy. Local Baxter Springs resident Geoffery Roberts led the effort to restore the historic property. As of 2023, it is open as a local center for events. The house is full of hand-painted pictures and murals by local artist Jordan Wood.
