= Camp Hunter =

Historic campsite in Kansas, U.S.

Coordinates: 37.0258°N 94.7346°W

Camp Hunter was established in June 1862 or a bit earlier at what is now Baxter Springs, Kansas. It was established by Union troops. At the same time Indian Home Guard regiments established a camp nearby on Little Five Mile Creek.

The white soldiers' camp was named after Gen. David Hunter. It was built along the south crest of the Spring Creek valley. The combined number of troops in both camps was about 6,000 men, according to Hugh Thompson, who was stationed as a scout in the area in June 1862.

The Army had three reasons for the establishment of the two camps. The first was to help escort wagon trains south into Indian Territory, where Indians loyal to the Confederacy attacked Union wagon trains. A second use for the camps was to be a place to send tired cavalry horses. The area west of the camps had much grass. The soldiers from the camps were needed to guard the horses.

A third reason for the establishment of the camps was to oppose the bushwhackers and Confederate Indians who roamed through the area. The major guerrilla group was under the command of Capt. Thomas R. Livingston.

As soon as the two camps were established, the Union troops took action to eliminate Livingston's guerrillas. Livingston, with about twenty-five men, had established a camp two miles northeast of Camp Hunter. The combined Union forces, under the direction of Col. Charles Doubleday, overran Livingston's camp, capturing many supplies and horses.

Livingston was not to be eliminated, however. Further attempts to destroy his force or capture it resulted in frustration. The Union troops from the two camps, and other Union troops nearby, repeatedly forced the guerrillas to scatter. Instead of being able to round them up, however, they found the guerrillas would simply disappear, not to be found until they decided to attack Union troops. After the War it was discovered the guerrillas had established a well concealed camp (Livingston's Hideout) 5½ miles east of Camp Hunter and just inside the Kansas border with Missouri.

In early September 1862 the area around Camp Hunter found itself in the path of a Confederate offensive. The 31st Texas Cavalry, under Col. Tresevant C. Hawpe, headed toward the two camps, which were quickly abandoned. He continued north and was defeated in a battle near present day Pittsburg, Kansas. After his defeat Hawpe retreated back to Camp Hunter and briefly occupied it. Possibly Livingston and Confederate Indians under Col. Stand Watie visited Camp Hunter around the same time.

From Camp Hunter, Hawpe invaded southwest Missouri, helping other Confederates in defeating Union forces in the First Battle of Newtonia on September 30. After Hawpe left, Camp Hunter was never occupied again. When Union forces returned to Baxter Springs in May 1863, they set up camp at a different site.
