= Waylande Gregory =

American sculptor (1905–1971)

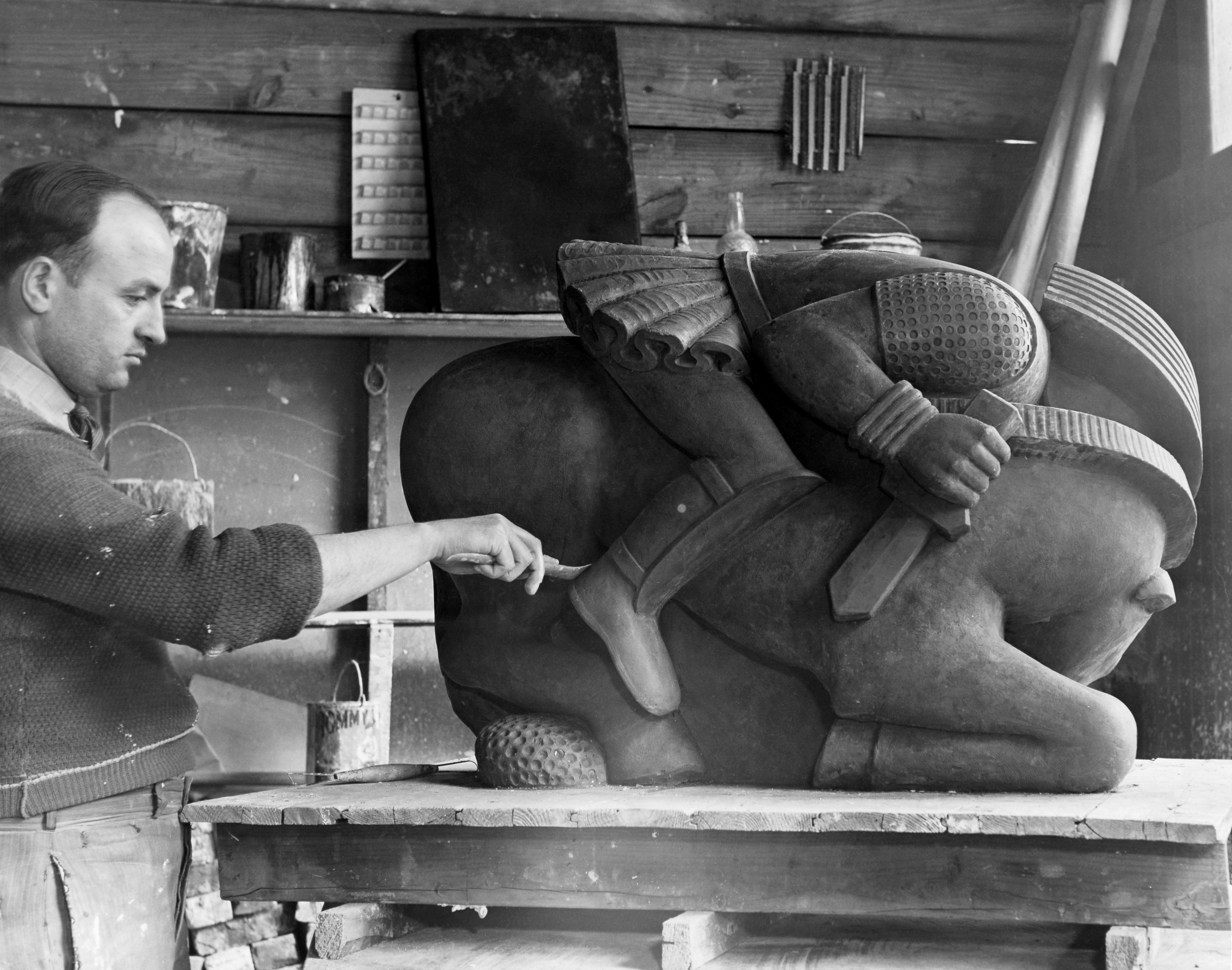
Waylande Gregory working on one of the six ceramic figures comprised in Light Dispelling Darkness (1937), a Federal Art Project sculpture at Roosevelt Park in Edison, New Jersey

Waylande Desantis Gregory (1905 Baxter Springs, Kansas – 1971, New Jersey) was one of the most innovative and prolific American art-deco ceramics sculptors of the early 20th century. His groundbreaking techniques enabled him to create monumental ceramic sculpture, such as the Fountain of the Atoms and Light Dispelling Darkness, which had hitherto not been possible. He also developed revolutionary glazing and processing methods, and was a seminal figure in the studio glass movement.

== Early life ==
Waylande Gregory was born in Baxter Springs, Kansas in 1905. His mother was a concert pianist, and his father was a farmer. From an early age he showed precocious artistic talent, beginning with small sculptures of animals in earth, as well as prodigious musical talent, even composing his own pieces. He at one time declared that he would no longer play pieces by Bach, but only original pieces he had written himself.

In 1913, his mother moved to Pittsburg, Kansas in order to gain better educational opportunities for her three sons. At age 11, Gregory enrolled at the laboratory grade school at State Manual Training Normal, a teacher's college, where he was taught by student teachers who were under supervision (the school would later become Pittsburg State University of Kansas). There, he studied crafts including carpentry and ceramics.

== Adolescence and early adulthood ==
By the age of 14, Gregory had made a bust of the school principal in only six sittings, as well as a ceramic statue called The Spirit of Athletics which was a composite of the best parts of three classmates. While in high school, he won awards for sculpture at the Kansas State Fair.

After high school he moved to Kansas City to attend the Kansas City Art Institute, but immediately began to receive commissions for the sculptural decoration of the administration building at the University of Kansas in Lawrence, a statue of Pan for a Kansas City park, and a plaster relief sculpture for the Masonic Temple Building in Wichita.

== Study under Taft ==
While at the Art Institute, he attracted the attention of Lorado Taft, a renowned sculptor who worked primarily in bronze and marble, academically trained at the Êcole des Beaux Arts in Paris, who already had a reputation as a mentor to other American sculptors such as Janet Scudder. Lorado Taft asked Waylande Gregory to be his assistant and to join him at the Art Institute of Chicago, and at his Midway Studios. Though originally, this internship was to last for only 18 months, Gregory studied with Taft for three years. Taft would also bring him to Europe, to study classical Renaissance sculpture as well as to visit other artists in Europe. His experience with Lorado Taft would lead him to begin thinking of ceramic sculpture on a monumental scale.

In the meantime, still in his 20s, Gregory would direct the decoration and design of the Missouri Theater, the Hotel President in Kansas City, and the bas relief panels at Brandenburg Field, Pittsburg State. His most famous work at the Hotel President was the Aztec Room, the hotel's dining room, which he decorated in Mayan plaster-of-Paris reliefs as interpreted in an Art-Deco idiom. Beneath the circular calendar, he placed a replica of an Aztec altar which had recently been excavated in Mexico, and which he had studied while in Chicago. The large sculpture of Quetzlcoatl, hidden lights, and the reddish hue contributed to the ambience of exoticism and mystery.

By 1928, his study under Lorado Taft ended as he was beginning to find that Taft's academic style, as well as the study of the casts of prominent Renaissance sculptures at the studio in Chicago, no longer satisfied him, as he was drawn more and more to the avant garde American and European art of the day.

== Cowan period ==
In 1928, he left Midway Studios and joined R. Guy Cowan in Rocky River, Ohio, a suburb of Cleveland, where he became the leading sculptor of the Cowan Pottery studio. Unlike his contemporaries at Cowan Pottery, who were primarily influenced by Viennese modern pottery (Wiener Werkstätte), Waylande Gregory was much more influenced by the Cleveland School as well as by leading American bronze sculptor Paul Manship, who had also created one design for Cowan. Gregory sought to create a distinctly American form, as for instance in his second sculpture of Henry Fonda, capturing in essence what he felt were the best American traits.

Cowan Pottery works were generally table-top-sized sculptures done in limited editions. Gregory's most famous sculptures from this period are Nautch Dancer and Burlesque, as well as Salome and Margarita. Salome combines the essential horror of the story of John the Baptist, his beheading, as well as Salome's veil dance. However, the horror of the event is muted, becoming secondary to an expression of the line, movement and dynamics of the drapery and human movement. Salome won first prize at the Cleveland Museum of Art May Show of 1929. Gregory's work for Cowan is characterized by smooth, linear, flowing forms.

In 1930 he married Yolande von Wagner, a Hungarian immigrant. Their relationship appeared to evolve to be based more on friendship than sexual love. Although she could be very critical, she was always very supportive of him as an artist. Due to the onset of the Great Depression, Cowan Studios closed their doors in 1931, bringing this chapter of Waylande Gregory's career to a close.

== Cranbrook period ==
In 1932, Waylande Gregory became artist in residence at the Cranbrook Academy of Art in Bloomfield Hills, Michigan, a suburb of Detroit. Here, he was able to further develop his craft as, for the first time, he had access to the precise control of an electric kiln. His sculpture evolved into more Italianate forms, with more volume and weight than before.

Also, it was here that he began to develop his sense of color more thoroughly, commenting that the "Chinese loved everything vivid and rich in tone, but we as a nation are just beginning to grow up to it." One of his most notable pieces is the terracotta sculpture of Two Clowns on Unicycles, a complex piece of two clowns back-to-back, one playing a tuba, the other juggling poodles. The sculpture is vividly colored, unlike much American sculpture of the time, which was usually monochrome bronze. Other notable sculptures from this period are Ichabod Crane and the Kansas Madonna. In 1933, this period came to a close after a conflict with the manager of the Cranbrook Academy; the kilns had been shut down over a bank holiday, ruining many of his works in progress.

== New Jersey period ==
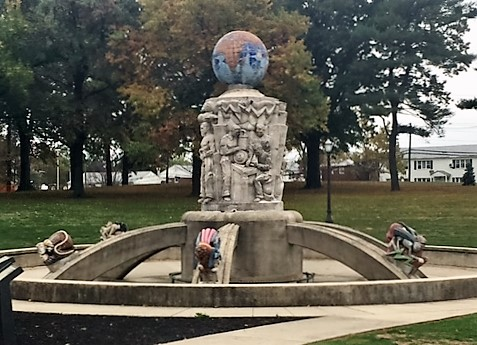
Light Dispelling Darkness in 2016

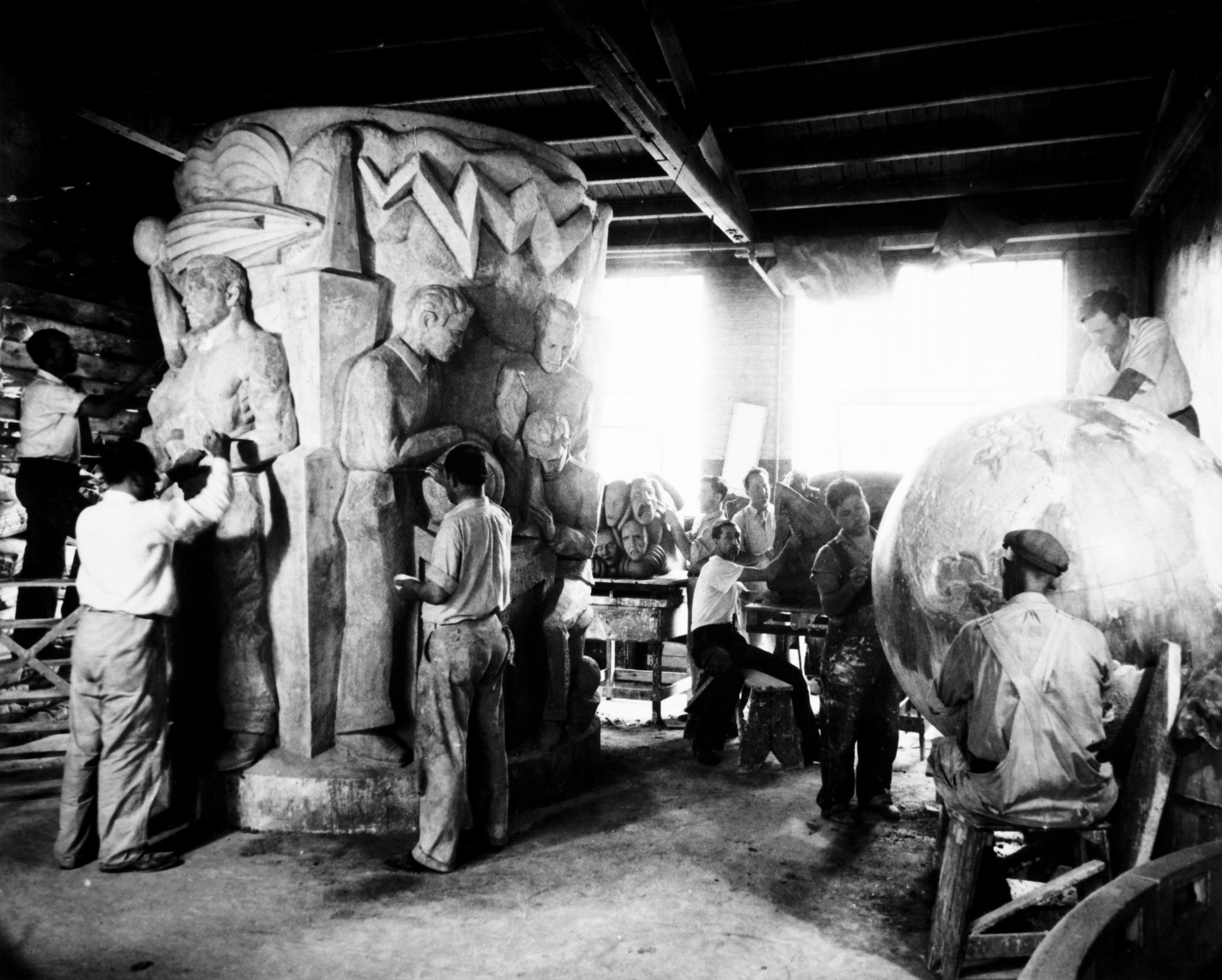
Gregory working on Light Dispelling Darkness in June 1937

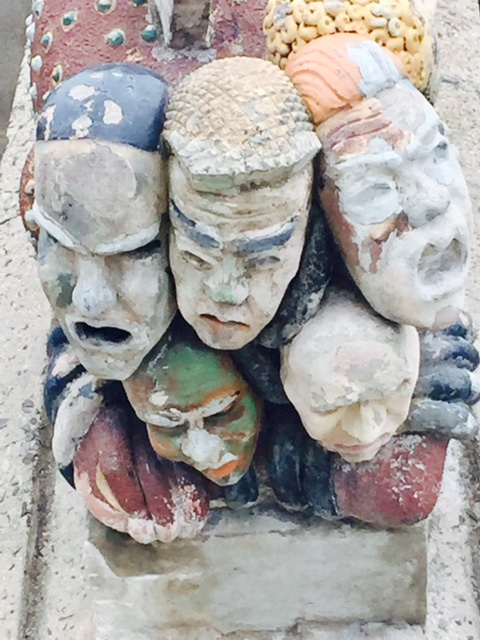
Light Dispelling Darkness (Detail)

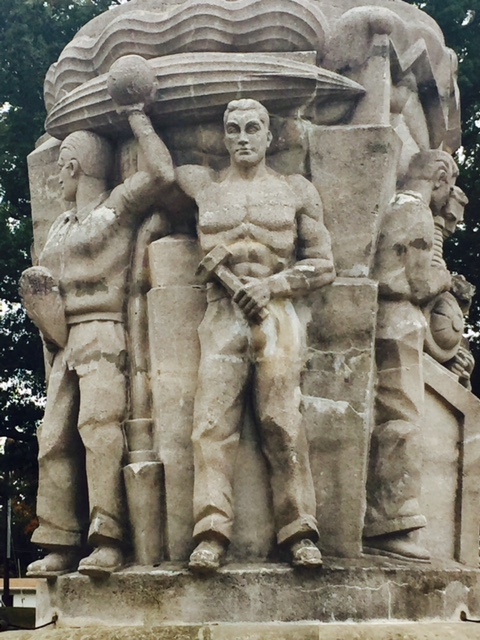
Light Dispelling Darkness (Detail)

In 1933, Gregory and his wife Yolanda had moved to Metuchen, New Jersey, where he set up a workshop in the Atlantic Terra Cotta Company in Perth Amboy. This is where he created some of his first monumental ceramic sculptures. As director of sculpture for the Federal Art Project in New Jersey, he began work on the monumental Light Dispelling Darkness, which still stands in Roosevelt Park in Menlo Park, New Jersey. Some photos are included in this article on the recently restored fountain. Others have been published in an article in Weird New Jersey.

=== Light Dispelling Darkness ===
Light Dispelling Darkness exhibits a heroic theme of combating evil through knowledge. It is a terracotta globe surmounting a shaft of relief figures of a scientist, an artist, an engineer, plus muscular, un-shirted men apparently representing industrial workers or working-class people. On the outside are six figures representing Pestilence, War, Famine, Death, Greed, and Materialism fleeing the forces of Science and Knowledge, an appropriate theme for Edison, NJ. Out of the six figures, four of them contain the horses of the Apocalypse.

== Fountain of the Atom ==
The Fountain of the Atom was made for the 1939 New York World's Fair. It features the classical four elements: Earth, Air, Fire, and Water, surrounded by eight electrons (four male and four female, similar to putti). Gregory described the electrons as "elemental little savages of boundless electrical energy, dancing to the rhythm of sculptured bolts of lightning-like flashes in brilliant colored glazes, their buoyant shaped bodies of richly modeled terracotta clays in warm colors". The four elements were grouped around illuminated tubes of glass which were topped by a flame, and carried water at the top of the fountain. Pictures of the maquette for Earth and one of the electrons have been published. Also at the Fair, for the General Motors Building, designed by industrial designer, Norman Bel Geddes, Gregory created two sculptural groupings, American Imports and Exports. He also executed ceramic sculptural works for the United States Building, where he worked with the building's designer, the well-known industrial designer, Walter Dorwin Teague.

== Later years ==
Gregory achieved critical success and reached the peak of his artistic powers in the 1930s. After 1940, he no longer created monumental ceramic sculptures, but instead focused on production porcelains for leading retail stores such as Mary Ryan, Tiffany's, B. Altman and Company, Saks Fifth Avenue, Lord and Taylor, Neiman Marcus, Bonwit Teller, Gump's, Hammacher Schlemmer, and many more. One of the most famous of these is a table setting with dishes and centerpieces done on a theme of polo players, a favorite subject which he liked to watch at Schley Field in Far Hills, New Jersey.

Gregory is also considered a pioneering studio glass artist (see Folk, "Fusing Earth and Sand", Am. Craft Council). In 1942, Gregory filed a patent for his process of fusing glass to ceramic. In the remaining years, he would make money by teaching art classes, and also made regular appearances on the television show, Ding Dong School.

Things began to look up in the 1960s, as he had acquired a patron in the form of Barbara Farmer, who had begun arrangements to build a new arts center in Middlefield, Massachusetts. The hopeful prospects came to an abrupt end when she was murdered by her husband, who suspected her of conducting an affair with Gregory. Gregory returned to New Jersey to resume his work, but he was never the same after that incident.

As he grew older, Gregory began to have problems handling the heavy weight of ceramic for his monumental sculpture, so he moved into hammered metal and lightweight materials such as foam, intended for later rendering in ceramic. His hammered lead sculpture The Dreamer won a silver medal from the National Sculpture Society in 1970.

== Technical legacy ==
Gregory overcame the limitations proscribing the use of ceramic sculpture in the production of larger monuments. There had been a tendency for clay to slump when not supported by an armature of metal or wood. If a sculpture was created from an entire piece in clay and then hollowed out to reduce the weight, there could be problems with sagging during firing, creating a tendency for the piece to crack.

After he had moved to New Jersey and was working with the large kilns at the Atlantic Terra Cotta Company, Gregory reinforced his larger sculptures using a honeycomb structure to build up the pieces from the inside out, making them self-supporting prior to firing, preventing sagging and cracking. Unlike most other ceramicists, who would fire a sculpture to biscuit and then add glaze with a second firing, Gregory would form, glaze, and fire the sculpture only once for the finished art work.

Gregory never used factory-made glazes, instead grinding and mixing all of the glazes himself, carefully controlling firing temperatures as well as kiln atmosphere to achieve the effects that he desired. Among his innovations are compressing of glaze powder into a crayon for sgraffito, and a patented process for fusing glass and ceramic together in a crackle pattern.
