= Max McCoy =

American journalist

- Born: Max Allan McCoy; October 30, 1958 (age 67); Baxter Springs, Kansas, U.S.
- Education: Pittsburg State University (BA); Emporia State University (MA)
- Occupations: Journalist; novelist
- Parent(s): Carl McCoy; Mary Carter
- Writing career
- Genres: Western fiction; thriller; mystery fiction

Max Allan McCoy (born October 30, 1958) is an American journalist and novelist.

He is the author of ten westerns, two thrillers, four original Indiana Jones adventures, the novelization of the mini-series Into the West and the first three volumes in Wylde’s West, a paranormal mystery series.

== Biography ==
Born in Baxter Springs, Kansas, McCoy is the son of Carl McCoy (1924–1997) and Mary Carter (1927–1986). He attended Baxter Springs High School, has a B.A. from Pittsburg State University and an M.A. from Emporia State University.

== Journalism ==
McCoy began his career in journalism in 1980 as a police reporter for The Pittsburg (Kansas) Morning Sun. In 1986, he traveled to Japan on a grant to report, in words and photos, the story of the aging survivors of the atomic bombs in Hiroshima and Nagasaki.

McCoy was the investigative reporter for The Joplin Globe in southwest Missouri and won first-place awards from the Associated Press Managing Editors and the Missouri Press Association for his reporting on unsolved murders, serial killers, and hate groups in the Ozarks.

== Works ==
=== Novels ===
Most of McCoy's novels are set in Missouri or Kansas, and major themes include alienation, redemption, complicated family and personal relationships, and the legacy of violence in American culture.

- The Sixth Rider (1991) ISBN 0-385-41495-1
- Sons of Fire (1993) ISBN 0-385-42030-7
- Home to Texas (1995) ISBN 0-553-56445-5
- The Wild Rider (1995) ISBN 0-553-56444-7
- Indiana Jones and the Philosopher’s Stone (1995) ISBN 0-553-56196-0
- Indiana Jones and the Dinosaur Eggs (1996) ISBN 0-553-56193-6
- Indiana Jones and the Hollow Earth (1997) ISBN 0-553-56195-2
- Indiana Jones and the Secret of the Sphinx (1999) ISBN 0-553-56197-9
- Jesse: A Novel of the Outlaw Jesse James (1999) ISBN 0-553-57178-8
- The Moon Pool (2004) ISBN 0-8439-5366-7
- Hinterland (2005) ISBN 978-0-8439-5514-9
- Into the West (2005) ISBN 978-0-4514-1188-4
- A Breed Apart: A Novel of Wild Bill Hickok (2006) ISBN 0-451-21987-2
- Hellfire Canyon (2007) ISBN 978-0-7860-1780-5
- I, Quantrill (2008) ISBN 978-0-451-22380-7
- Canyon Diablo (2010) ISBN 978-0-7860-2120-8
- Damnation Road (2010) ISBN 978-0-7860-2121-5
- The Sixth Rider 20th Anniversary Edition. (2011) Kindle e-book.
- Of Grave Concern: An Ophelia Wylde Paranormal Mystery (2013) ISBN 978-0-7582-8193-7
- The Spirit Is Willing: An Ophelia Wylde Paranormal Mystery (2014) ISBN 978-0-7582-8195-1
- Giving Up the Ghost: An Ophelia Wylde Paranormal Mystery (2015) ISBN 978-0-7582-8197-5

=== Short stories ===
- "Spoils of War", Louis L’Amour Western Magazine. May 1994: 7-20. Winner of the Oxbow Award for Short Fiction.
- "The Devil and Bill Doolin", Cactus Country. Lou Turner, ed. Memphis: High Hill press, 2011: 20–35.

=== Non-fiction ===
- Zero Minutes to Midnight. (2011)
- Elevations: A Personal Exploration of the Arkansas River (2018) ISBN 978-0-7006-2602-1

== Awards ==
=== Literary Awards ===
- 1991 – Spur The Sixth Rider
- 2005 – ESU Outstanding Master Alumnus
- 2008 – Spur Hellfire Canyon
- 2008 – Kansas Notable Book: Hellfire Canyon
- 2011 – Spur Damnation Road
- 2014 – Kansas Notable Book: Of Grave Concern
- 2019 – Kansas Notable Book: Elevations: A Personal Exploration of the Arkansas River

=== Journalism Awards ===
- 2001 – Investigative Reporting, Associated Press, 2001 (“Ordained by Hate”).
- 2002 – Investigative Reporting, Associated Press, 2002 (“The Killing Season”).
- 2013 – Distinguished Newspaper Advisor – College Media Association [x]
