= Edgar Backus Schermerhorn House =

Historic house in Kansas, United States

- U.S. National Register of Historic Places
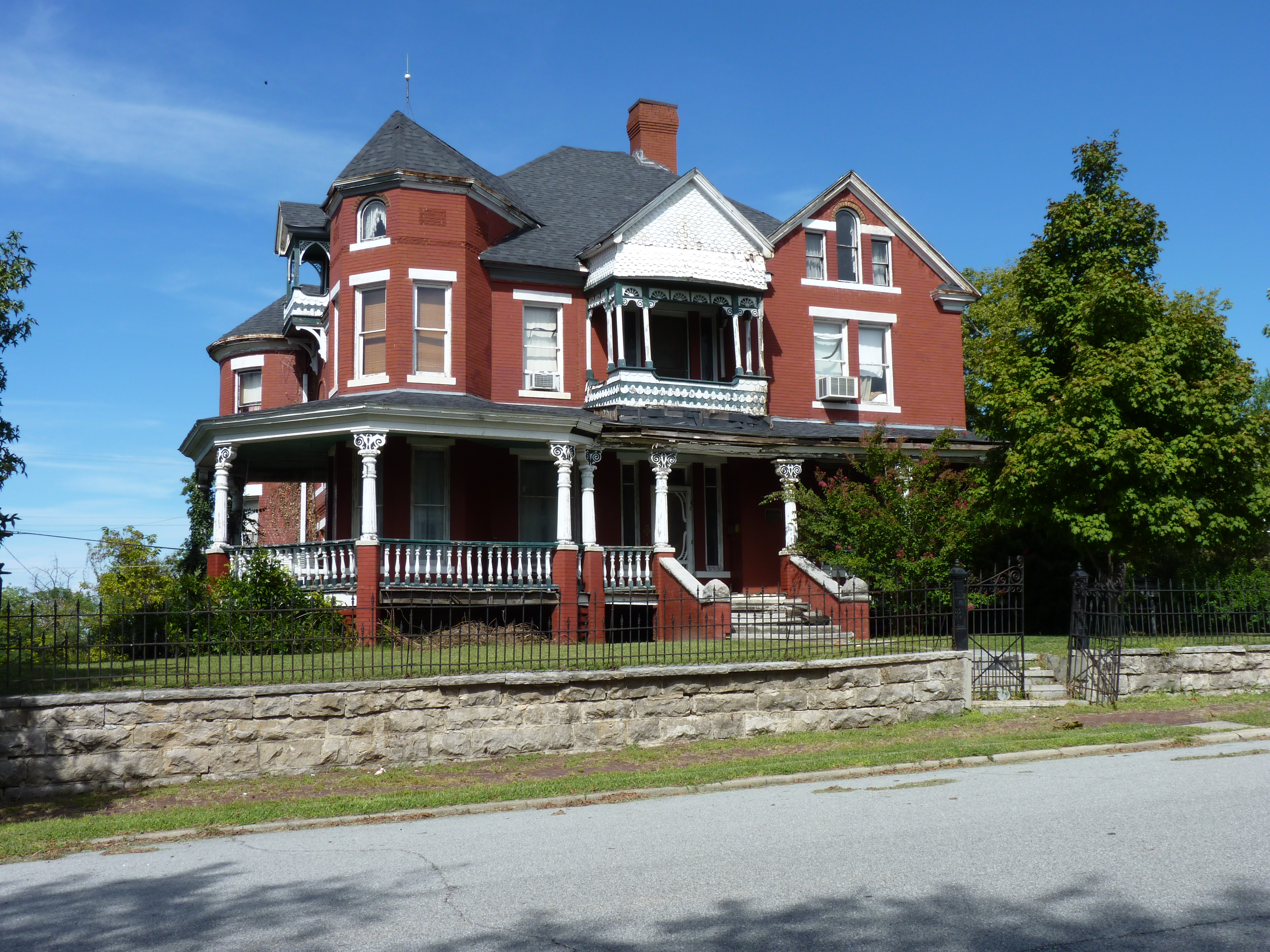

- Location within Kansas Location within the United States
- Location: 803 E. 5th St., Galena, Kansas
- Coordinates: 37°4′35″N 94°37′20″W
- Area: less than one acre
- Built: c. 1895
- Architect: Anderson & Strong
- Architectural style: Queen Anne
- NRHP reference No.: 89001146
- Added to NRHP: August 21, 1989

The Edgar Backus Schermerhorn House is a historic house located at 803 E. 5th St. in Galena, Kansas. The house was built circa 1895 for Edgar Backus Schermerhorn, a wealthy businessman who owned many of the area's lead and zinc mines. Architects Anderson & Strong designed the home in the Queen Anne style. The house's design features a porch along the entire front side, a hipped roof with cross gables, and projecting bays and gables. The home's interior features lead glass windows and imported English woodwork using six different types of wood. Schermerhorn lived in the house until his death in 1923, after which his sister, Minnie K. Lennon, inherited the property. Lennon, who had previously lived on a farm, continued to raise farm animals at the house, keeping a cow in the yard and chickens in the library. Lennon occupied the house until her 1939 death.

The house was added to the National Register of Historic Places on August 21, 1989.
