= Livingston's Hideout =

Confederate military camp inside Kansas during the Civil War

- Cherokee County, Kansas

Site information
- Type: guerrilla hideout
- Controlled by: Confederate guerrillas

Location
- Coordinates: 37.0253°N 94.6210°W

Site history
- Built: ca. spring 1862
- In use: ca. spring 1862 to ca. summer 1863

Garrison information
- Past commanders: Major Thomas R. Livingston
- Garrison: same

Livingston's Hideout was most likely the only permanent Confederate military camp inside Kansas during the Civil War. It was in the very corner of southeast Kansas, in the very corner of Cherokee County, Kansas. It was about 2 miles (3.2 km) north of the border with Indian Territory and it was less than 100 feet (30 m) west of the border with Missouri. It was 5 miles (8.0 km) east of Baxter Springs, where a series of Union military posts existed from 1862 to 1863. Thomas R. Livingston became a leader of a group of Confederate guerrillas in the area, becoming first a captain and then a major. He needed locations to hide himself and his guerrillas from pursuing Union troops and this hideout suited the guerrillas well. The guerrillas sought to spy on Union forces and raiding units he found small enough to defeat.

No one knows when Livingston found his hideout, but he possibly began using it in spring 1862. No Union troops knew of its existence during the Civil War. The campsite was in a heavily wooded area. A road runs just west of the campsite and is about 100 feet (30 m) above it. The area of the campsite cannot be seen from the road, as it is in the woods and the area beyond the road drops off sharply before the camp begins. The site is flat and somewhat oval shaped. It is 100 feet (30 m) wide and 200 feet (61 m) long. A creek is about 50 feet (15 m) below the campsite and a hill to the east, inside Missouri, is on the east side of the creek, about 50 feet (15 m) above the campsite. The creek runs through a long valley. This camp would have been almost in plain sight, yet invisible.

The use of Livingston's hideout proved a great frustration for the area's Union troops. Many times the troops chased the guerrillas, only to have them scatter and seemingly vanish. The hideout was used at least July 1863, when Livingston was killed in a fight with Union troops in Stockton, Missouri. After its use ceased, it was not rediscovered until after the War. Eventually, in the 1980s someone decided to build a house there and Betty Kyrias, of the Baxter Springs Historical Society, discovered the site yet again.
