= Cherokee Strip (Kansas) =

Disputed area of land on the southern border of the U.S. state of Kansas

The Cherokee Strip of Kansas, in the United States, was a disputed strip of land on the southern border of the state.

== Description ==
In 1825 the Osage Nation was given a reservation in eastern Indian Territory in what is now Kansas. In the Treaty of New Echota, May 23, 1836, the northern border of the Cherokee Nation's land was set as the southern border of the Osage lands. When Congress passed the Kansas–Nebraska Act on May 30, 1854, it set the southern border of the Kansas Territory as the 37th parallel north. It was thought at the time that the Osage northern border was also the 37th parallel.

The Cherokees immediately complained, saying that it was not the true boundary and that the border of Kansas should be moved north to accommodate the actual border of the Cherokee land.

The situation languished during the troubles in Kansas leading up to the Civil War. In the 1866 Cherokee Reconstruction treaty, the Cherokee agreed to cede, in trust to the United States, such portion of their land that is in present-day Kansas. A commission was set up to survey the disputed land. The survey, approved December 11, 1871, found that the border was "off by 2.46 miles" (3.96 km). The strip in question ran from the Neosho River to the 100th meridian and amounted to 434,679.36 acres (679.19 square miles; 1,759.08 square kilometres).

Under terms of Article 17 of the Treaty of 1866, the land was to be sold "at not less than $1.25 an acre" ($3.09/ha) for the first year and then offered for sale at local land offices. The first year 156,848.47 acres (245.08 square miles; 634.74 square kilometres) were sold, and the balance of 277,830.89 acres (434.11 square miles; 1,124.34 square kilometres) was turned over to land offices during the summer of 1879. As required, the proceeds were placed in the United States Treasury subject to order of the Cherokee national council.
