= Baxter Springs, Kansas =

City in Cherokee County, Kansas

- City
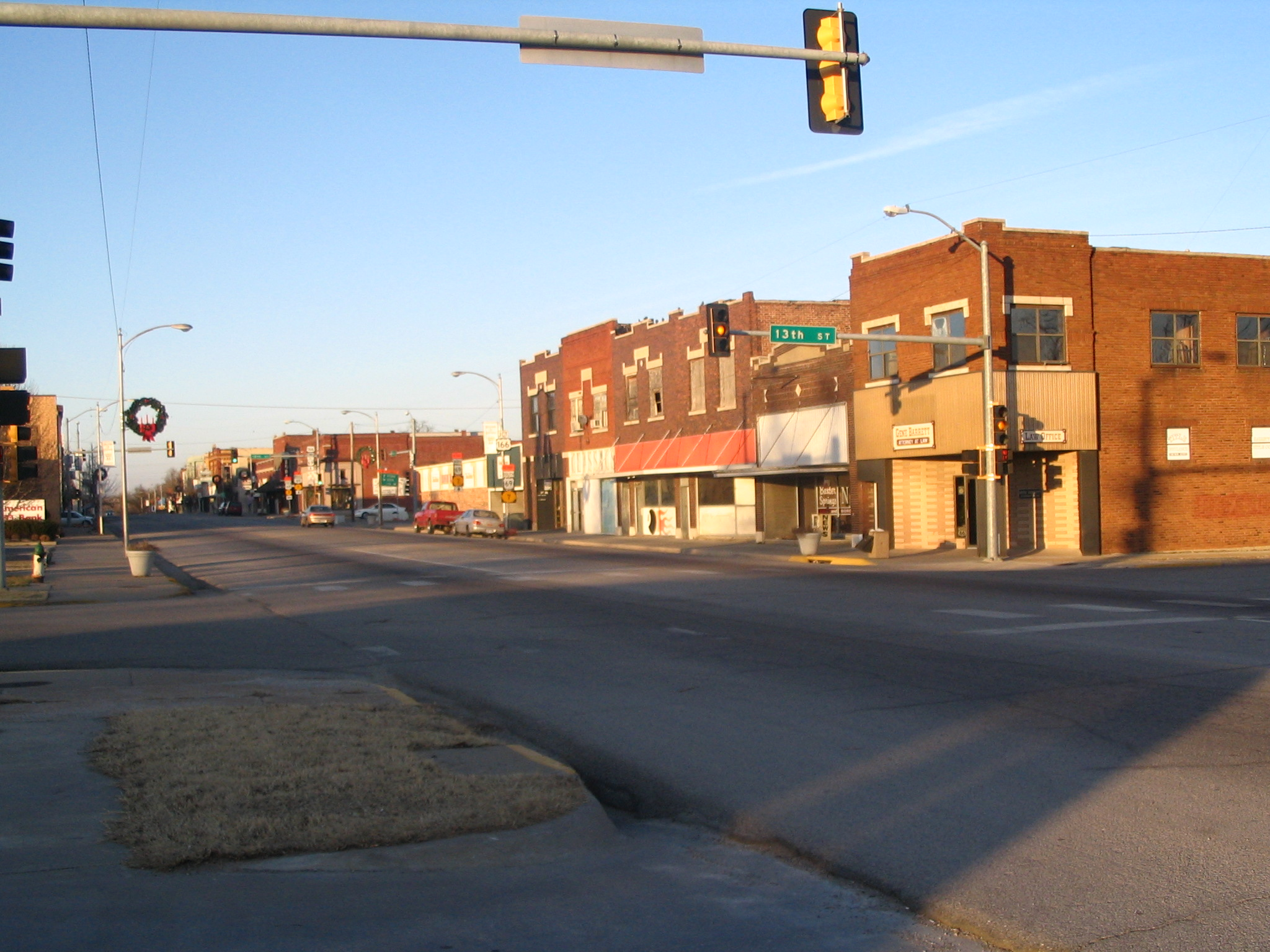
- Downtown Baxter Springs (2008)

- Location within Cherokee County and Kansas

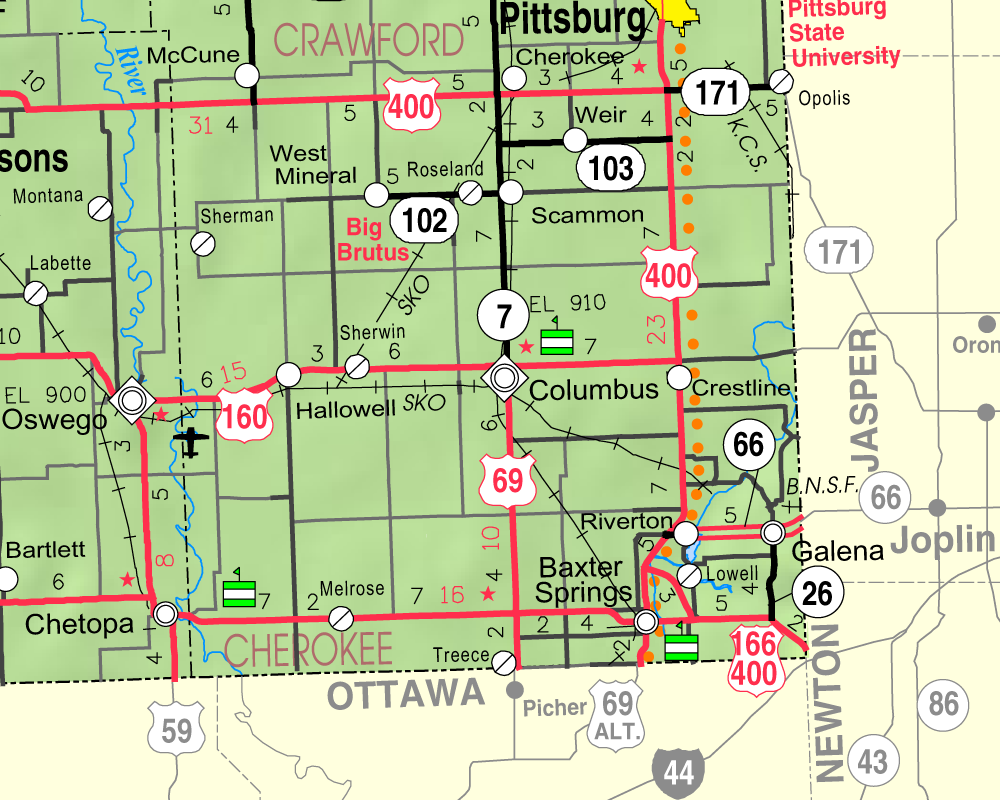
- KDOT map of Cherokee County (legend)
- Coordinates: 37°01′10″N 94°44′06″W
- Country: United States
- State: Kansas
- County: Cherokee
- Founded: 1858
- Incorporated: 1868
- Named for: John J. Baxter

Area
  - Total: 3.24 sq mi (8.38 km^{2})
  - Land: 3.15 sq mi (8.16 km^{2})
  - Water: 0.089 sq mi (0.23 km^{2})
- Elevation: 843 ft (257 m)

Population (2020)
  - Total: 3,888
  - Density: 1,230/sq mi (476/km^{2})
- Time zone: UTC-6 (CST)
  - Summer (DST): UTC-5 (CDT)
- ZIP Code: 66713
- Area code: 620
- FIPS code: 20-04625
- GNIS ID: 485544
- Website: City webpage

Baxter Springs is a city in Cherokee County, Kansas, United States, and located along Spring River. As of the 2020 census, the population of the city was 3,888.

== History ==
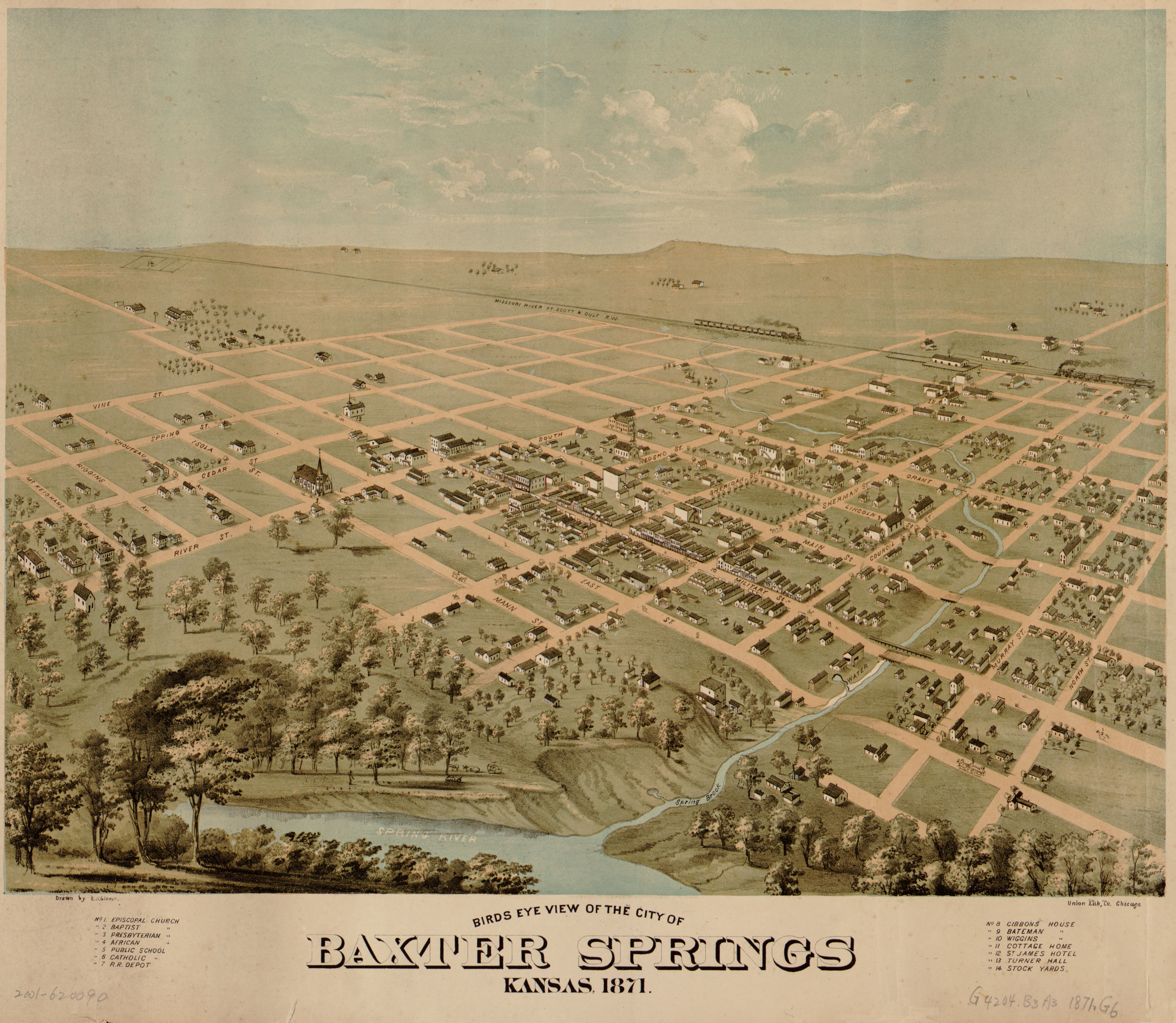
Panoramic map of Baxter Springs from 1871

=== Indigenous settlement ===
For thousands of years, indigenous peoples had lived along the waterways throughout the west. The Osage migrated west from the Ohio River area of Kentucky, driven out by the Iroquois. They settled in Kansas by the mid-17th century, adopting Plains Indian traditions. They competed with other tribes and by 1750 they dominated much of what is now the region of Kansas, Missouri and Oklahoma.

One of the largest Osage bands was led by Chief Black Dog (Manka - Chonka). His men completed what became known as the Black Dog Trail by 1803. It started from their winter territory east of Baxter Springs and extended southwest to their summer hunting grounds at the Great Salt Plains in present-day Alfalfa County, Oklahoma. The Osage regularly stopped at the springs for healing on their way to summer hunting grounds. They made the trail by clearing it of brush and large rocks, and constructing earthen ramps to the fords. Wide enough for eight horsemen to ride abreast, the trail was the first improved road in Kansas and Oklahoma.

=== American frontier ===
During the Indian Removal era of the late 1830s, the Cherokee people—one of the Five Civilized Tribes—were forced out of the southeastern United States to west of the Mississippi River. The United States government defined this area in extreme southeastern Kansas as part of the Cherokee Neutral Lands.

A natural spring that the Osage Indians had long visited flowed from the side of a hill near the Military Road, which ran between Fort Scott and Fort Gibson.

Because the Baxter family settled on Cherokee Neutral Lands, his presence was legally contentious. Historical county litigation records show that Cherokee authorities and later government agents attempted to evict him and other white squatters multiple times. Baxter stubbornly refused to leave, defending his tavern claim until the land was eventually ceded and officially made open to white settlement following the Civil War.

A community of Native Americans and European-American settlers subsequently began to develop around the post. The 19th-century settlers eventually named the city and nearby springs after him. .

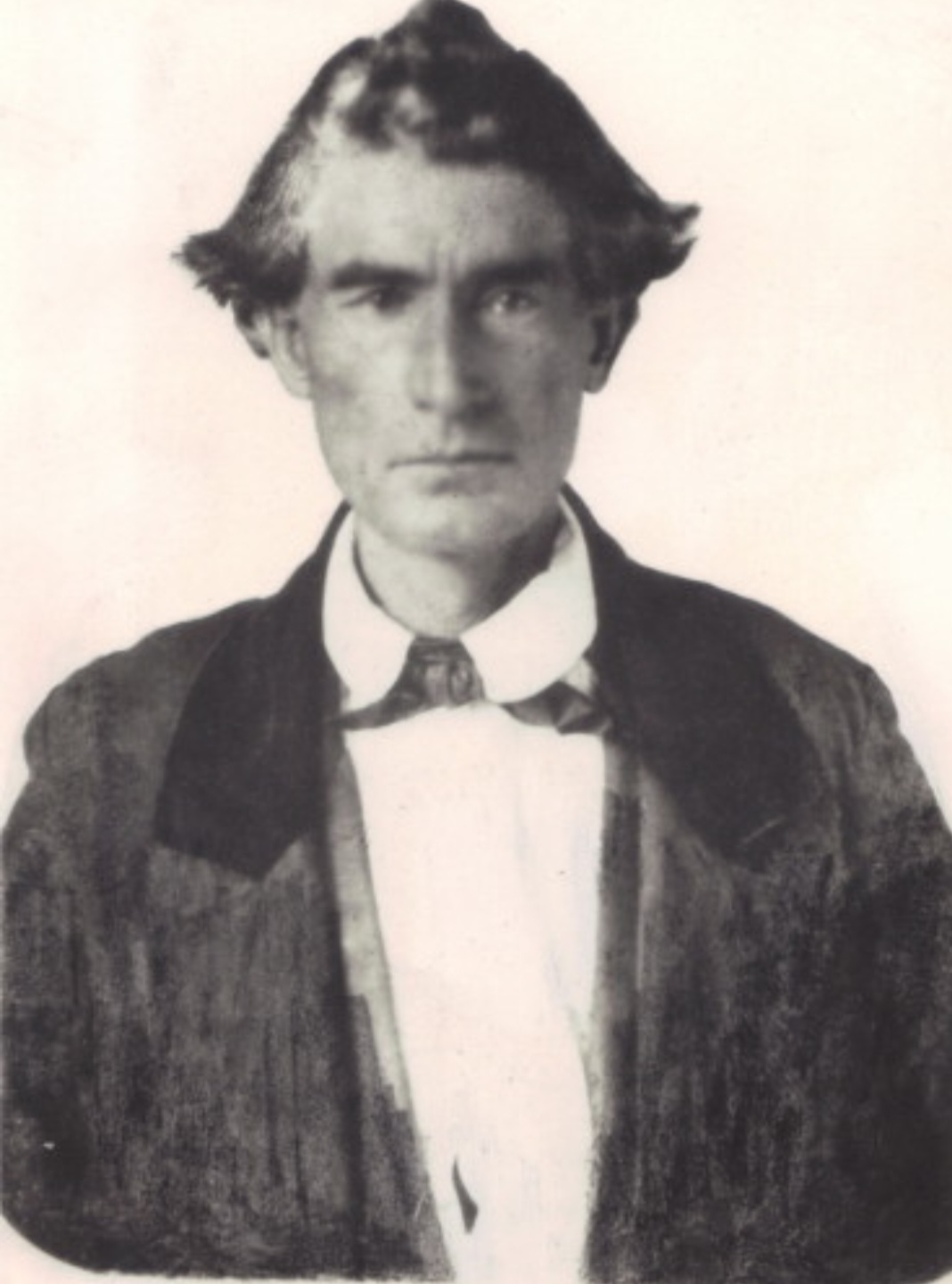
John J. Baxter

Nineteenth-century biographical sketches describe Baxter as an imposing figure. He stood around six feet, four inches tall and weighed roughly 250 pounds. Local historical anecdotes paint him as an eccentric, fiercely independent, and highly argumentative man who frequently found himself at odds with neighboring homesteaders and local authorities.

=== Civil War era ===
During the American Civil War, the United States government built several rudimentary military posts at present-day Baxter Springs, fortifying what had been a trading post: Fort Baxter, Camp Ben Butler and Camp Hunter. This was to protect settlers against the Confederate regulars and partisan guerrillas operating in the eastern part of state.

On October 4, 1863, some 400 men of the pro-Southern Quantrill's raiders were passing on their way to Texas for the winter. They attacked Fort Blair. Part of the garrison was away from the fort on assignment. The remainder, mostly United States Colored Troops, held the fort with few casualties. Quantrill's men later encountered an unrelated detachment of 103 Union troops out on the prairie. The Confederates overwhelmed them, killing nearly all the Union men, including many after they were captured.

After temporarily reinforcing the fort, the United States abandoned the Baxter Springs area later that year. It moved its troops to the better fortified Fort Scott, Kansas. Before leaving, US forces tore down and destroyed Fort Baxter to make it unusable for hostiles.

Following the Civil War, Baxter Springs became known as one of the wildest cowtowns of the West. Drovers bringing herds of cattle northward found the town a welcome respite after three to four months on the dusty trail. They made the most of the numerous saloons and other attractions of what is now known as the "First Cowtown in Kansas."

=== Cowtown ===
Most of the town's growth took place after the war, when it began to develop at a rapid pace. By 1867, entrepreneurs had constructed a cable ferry across the Spring River, which was operated into the 1880s. At that time, it was replaced by the first bridge built across the river.

Around 1868 there was a great demand for beef in the North. Texas cattlemen and stock raisers drove large herds of cattle from the southern plains, and used Baxter Springs as a way point to the northern markets at Kansas City, which linked to railroads to the East. This led to the dramatic growth of Baxter Springs by the early 1870s as the first "cow town" in Kansas. By 1875, its population was estimated at 5,000.

The town organized the Stockyards and Drovers Association to buy and sell cattle. They constructed corrals for up to 20,000 head of cattle, supplied with ample grazing lands and fresh water. Texas cattle trade stimulated the growth of related businesses, and Baxter Springs grew rapidly. The town was regularly the rowdy gathering place of cowboys, and saloons, livery stables, brothels and hotels were developed to support their seasonal business. At the same time other settlers were building schools and churches, to support family life.

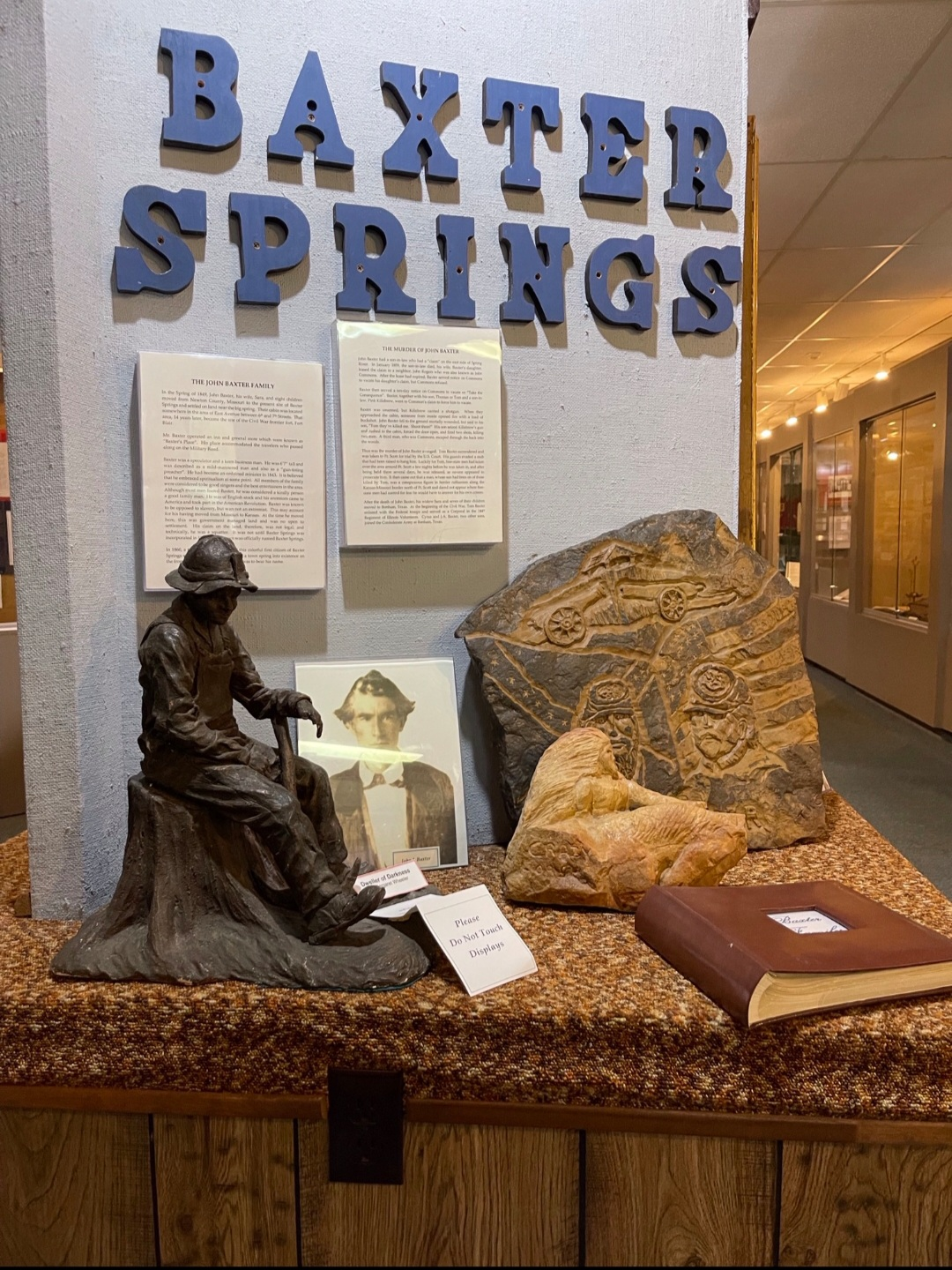
Baxter Springs Museum

=== Resort town ===
After railroads were constructed from the North into Texas later in the century, cattlemen no longer needed to conduct the cattle drives, or to use Baxter Springs as a way station to markets. The first railroad to enter Texas from the north, completed in 1872, was the Missouri–Kansas–Texas Railroad As ranchers started shipping their beef directly from Texas, business in Baxter Springs and other cow towns fell off sharply.

However, the Baxter spring developed a medicinal reputation. The town became a destination resort around the springs for travelers brought by the new railroad.

=== Mining center ===
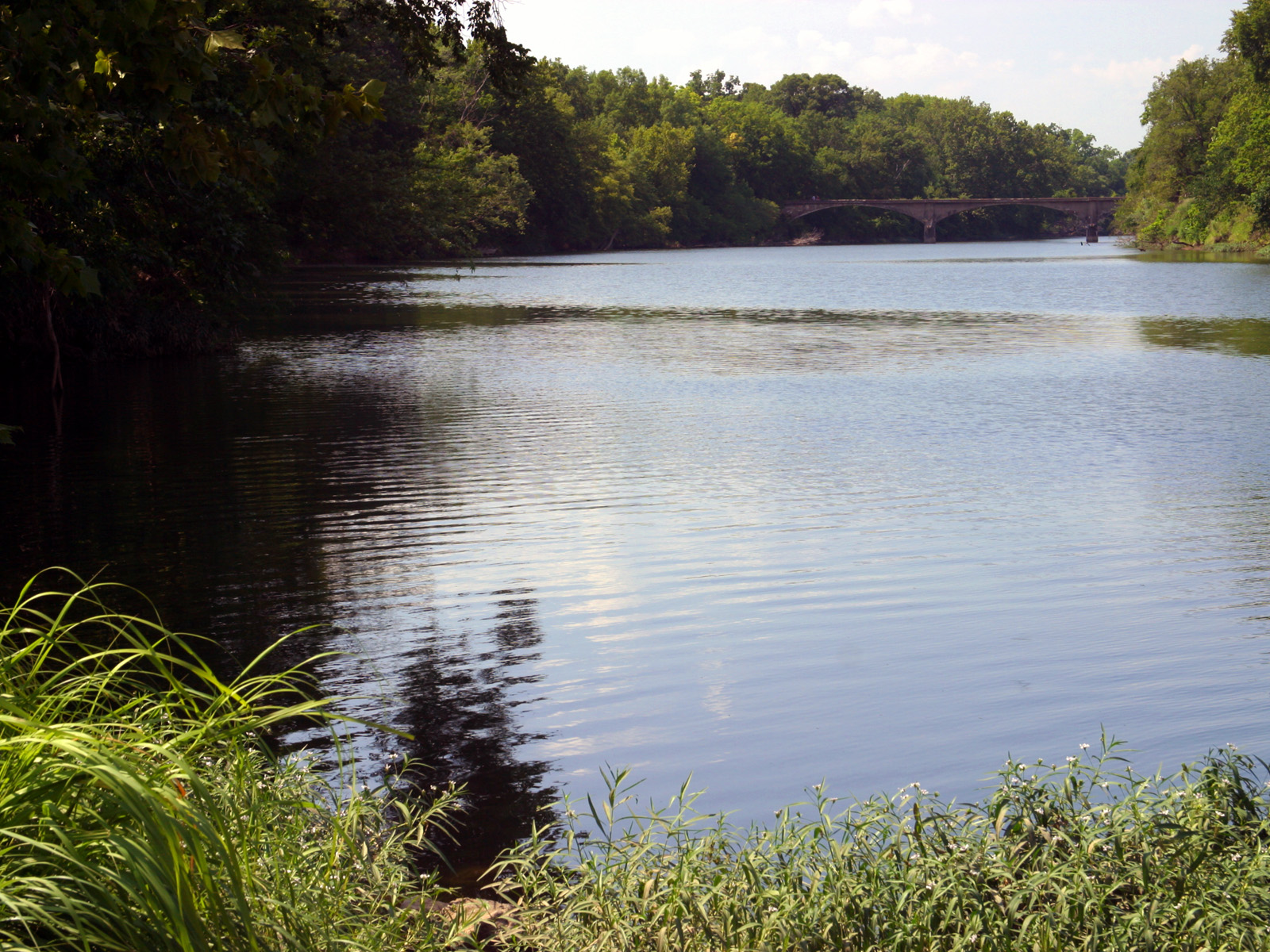
Spring River from Riverside Park in Baxter Springs

The discovery of lead in large veins in the tri-state area revived the area towns from the economic doldrums in the early twentieth century. In the early days of Baxter Springs, lead had been found in small quantities along Spring Creek, but it was of poor quality. It was suspected that higher grade ore could be found, but only at deeper depths. The Baxter Springs City Council by Ordinance 42 enacted provisions that greatly limited any mining within city limits. Their actions protected the land in the city; nearby towns have suffered from mining-related environmental degradation.

Baxter Springs certainly benefited from the business and revenues generated by regional mining activity. Many of the mine owners and operators built ambitious houses here to reflect their success. In addition, in the early 1900s many mining executives built their business offices in Baxter Springs. By the 1940s, however, much of the high-quality ore had been mined, and the industry declined in the region. Some towns became defunct, and Hockerville, Lincolnville, Douthit, Zincville and others disappeared. The mining practices of the time caused considerable environmental degradation in the region. Federal and state restoration efforts have helped to improve the land since the late twentieth century.

In 1926, the downtown main street was designated as part of the historic Route 66 transcontinental highway connecting Chicago and Los Angeles. The highway became known informally as America's "Main Street", because it used the main arteries of many cities. Designation as Route 66 stimulated related growth along the highway, including of motels and fast food places, and it gained a prominent place in popular culture. Baxter Springs was one of only three towns through which Route 66 passed in Kansas.

Since the late 20th century, the town has reserved the land of Riverside Park along the Spring River. This has renewed the community's connection and preserved access to the river and its green banks.

=== 2014 tornado ===
A tornado started near Quapaw, Oklahoma and moved through Baxter Springs on April 27, 2014.

== Geography ==
Baxter Springs is sited on the western bank of the Spring River at the edge of the Ozarks, in the Spring River basin. U.S. Route 69 Alternate and U.S. Route 166 have a junction at the city, and U.S. Route 400 bypasses it to the northeast. The center of town is less than two miles (3 km) from the Kansas-Oklahoma state border, though the incorporated area of the city extends to the border. It is also about 13 miles (21 km) west-southwest of Joplin, Missouri.

According to the United States Census Bureau, the city has a total area of 3.19 square miles (8.26 km^{2}), of which 3.11 square miles (8.05 km^{2}) is land and 0.08 square miles (0.21 km^{2}) is water.

== Demographics ==
Historical population
Census	Pop.	Note	%±
1870	1,284		—
1880	1,177		−8.3%
1890	1,248		6.0%
1900	1,641		31.5%
1910	1,598		−2.6%
1920	3,608		125.8%
1930	4,541		25.9%
1940	4,921		8.4%
1950	4,647		−5.6%
1960	4,498		−3.2%
1970	4,489		−0.2%
1980	4,773		6.3%
1990	4,351		−8.8%
2000	4,602		5.8%
2010	4,238		−7.9%
2020	3,888		−8.3%
U.S. Decennial Census

=== 2020 census ===
As of the 2020 census, Baxter Springs had a population of 3,888 people, with 1,595 households and 979 families. The population density was 1,234.7 per square mile (476.7/km^{2}). There were 1,898 housing units at an average density of 602.7 per square mile (232.7/km^{2}).

The median age was 38.8 years. 23.8% of residents were under the age of 18, 9.5% were from 18 to 24, 23.7% were from 25 to 44, 25.7% were from 45 to 64, and 17.3% were 65 years of age or older. For every 100 females, there were 98.2 males, and for every 100 females age 18 and over there were 97.1 males age 18 and over. 0.0% of residents lived in urban areas, while 100.0% lived in rural areas.

There were 1,595 households, of which 29.9% had children under the age of 18 living in them. Of all households, 43.8% were married-couple households, 20.1% were households with a male householder and no spouse or partner present, and 28.1% were households with a female householder and no spouse or partner present. About 32.1% of all households were made up of individuals and 15.7% had someone living alone who was 65 years of age or older. The average household size was 2.5 and the average family size was 3.3.

There were 1,898 housing units, of which 16.0% were vacant. The homeowner vacancy rate was 5.1% and the rental vacancy rate was 11.0%.

Racial composition as of the 2020 census
Race	Number	Percent
White	3,066	78.9%
Black or African American	15	0.4%
American Indian and Alaska Native	275	7.1%
Asian	25	0.6%
Native Hawaiian and Other Pacific Islander	18	0.5%
Some other race	42	1.1%
Two or more races	447	11.5%
Hispanic or Latino (of any race)	119	3.1%

=== Demographic estimates ===
The percent of those with a bachelor's degree or higher was estimated to be 14.5% of the population.

=== Income and poverty ===
The 2016–2020 5-year American Community Survey estimates show that the median household income was $37,926 (with a margin of error of +/- $8,483) and the median family income was $54,219 (+/- $13,154). Males had a median income of $31,010 (+/- $2,470) versus $27,361 (+/- $9,774) for females. The median income for those above 16 years old was $30,629 (+/- $3,847). Approximately, 9.6% of families and 10.8% of the population were below the poverty line, including 9.2% of those under the age of 18 and 9.0% of those ages 65 or over.

=== 2010 census ===
As of the census of 2010, there were 4,238 people, 1,754 households, and 1,151 families residing in the city. The population density was 1,362.7 inhabitants per square mile (526.1/km^{2}). There were 2,053 housing units at an average density of 660.1 per square mile (254.9/km^{2}). The racial makeup of the city was 85.2% White, 0.8% African American, 6.2% Native American, 0.4% Asian, 1.4% Pacific Islander, 0.4% from other races, and 5.7% from two or more races. Hispanic or Latino of any race were 1.7% of the population.

There were 1,754 households, of which 33.1% had children under the age of 18 living with them, 47.9% were married couples living together, 12.7% had a female householder with no husband present, 5.0% had a male householder with no wife present, and 34.4% were non-families. 30.6% of all households were made up of individuals, and 14.6% had someone living alone who was 65 years of age or older. The average household size was 2.41 and the average family size was 2.99.

The median age in the city was 38 years. 26.1% of residents were under the age of 18; 8% were between the ages of 18 and 24; 25.1% were from 25 to 44; 25% were from 45 to 64; and 15.9% were 65 years of age or older. The gender makeup of the city was 48.6% male and 51.4% female.

== Education ==
The community is served by Baxter Springs USD 508 public school district.

== Notable people ==
- Waylande Gregory (1905–1971), artist
- Richard Hilderbrand, member of the Kansas Senate
- Hale Irwin (b. 1945), PGA golfer
- Max McCoy (b. 1958), journalist and author (Indiana Jones, Elevations)
- Charles Parham (1873–1929), Pentecostal leader
- Joe Rooney (b. 1975), lead guitarist for country pop trio Rascal Flatts
- H. Lee Scott Jr. (b. 1949), former president and CEO of Wal-Mart.
- Tim Shallenburger (b. 1954), former Kansas State Treasurer and Speaker of the Kansas House
- Byron Stewart (b. 1956), actor (The White Shadow, St. Elsewhere)
- Glad Youse (1898 – 1985), composer

== Gallery ==
- Historic Images of Baxter Springs, Special Photo Collections at Wichita State University Library
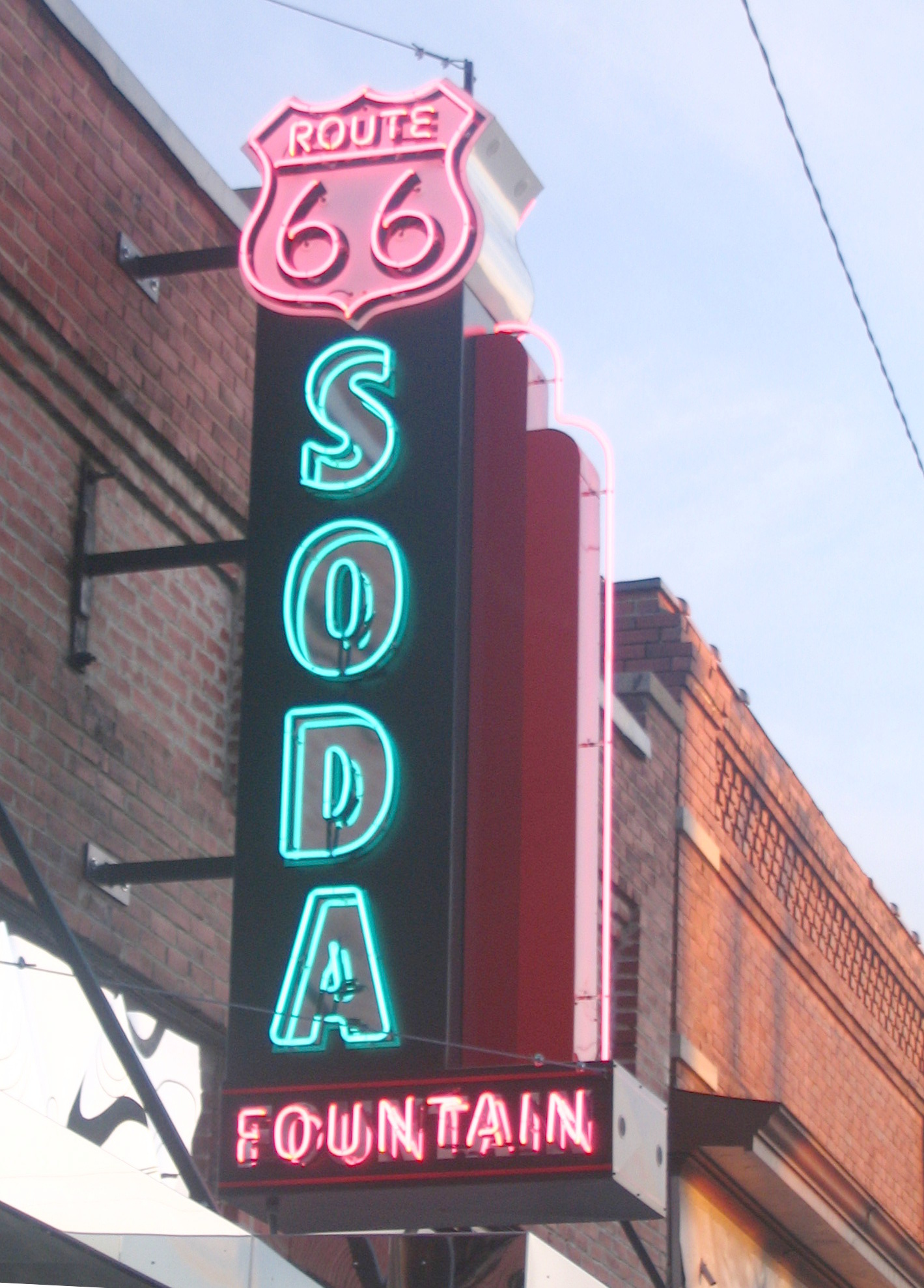
Route 66 Soda Fountain, 2008

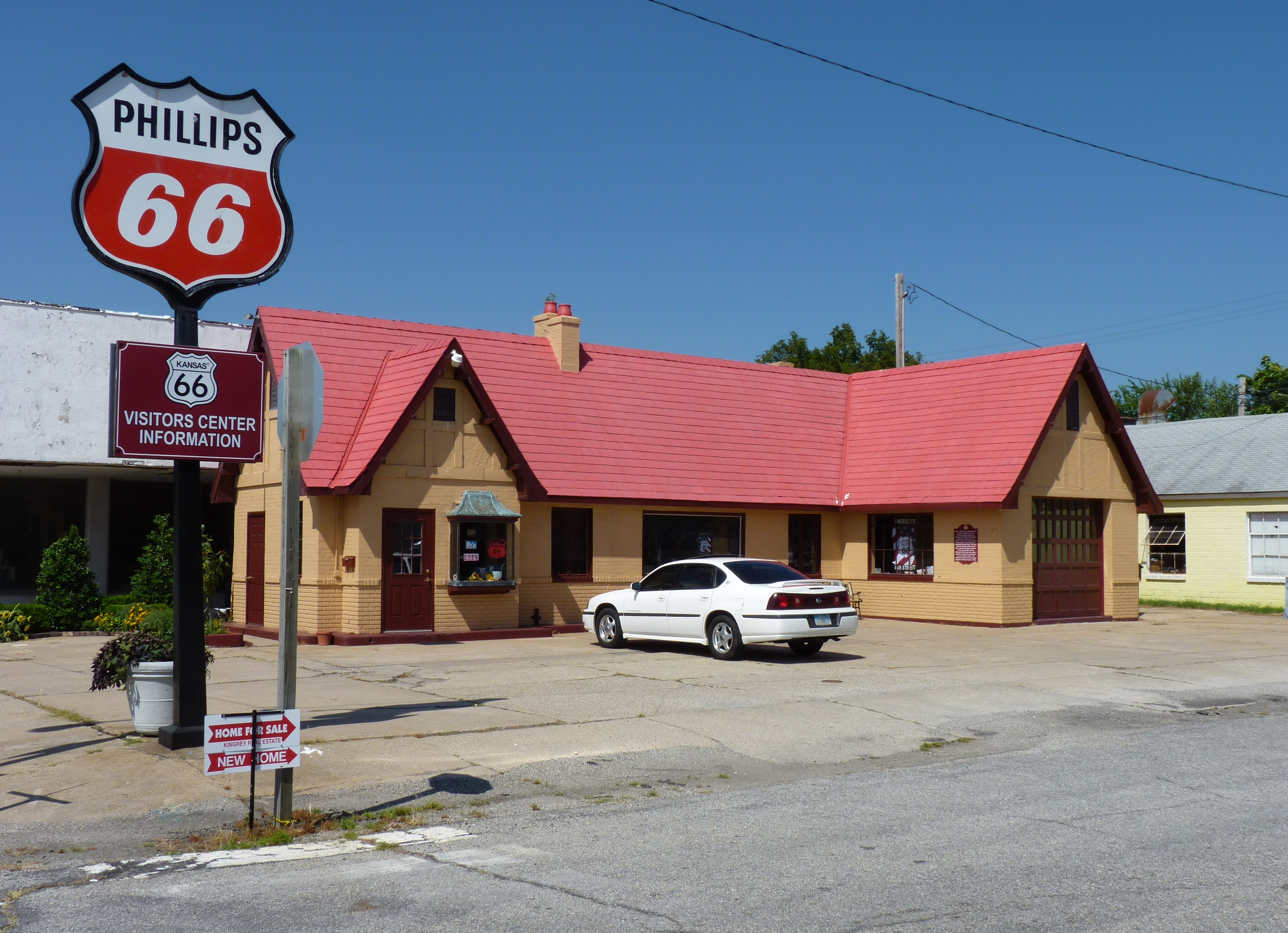
Route 66 Welcome Center, 2010

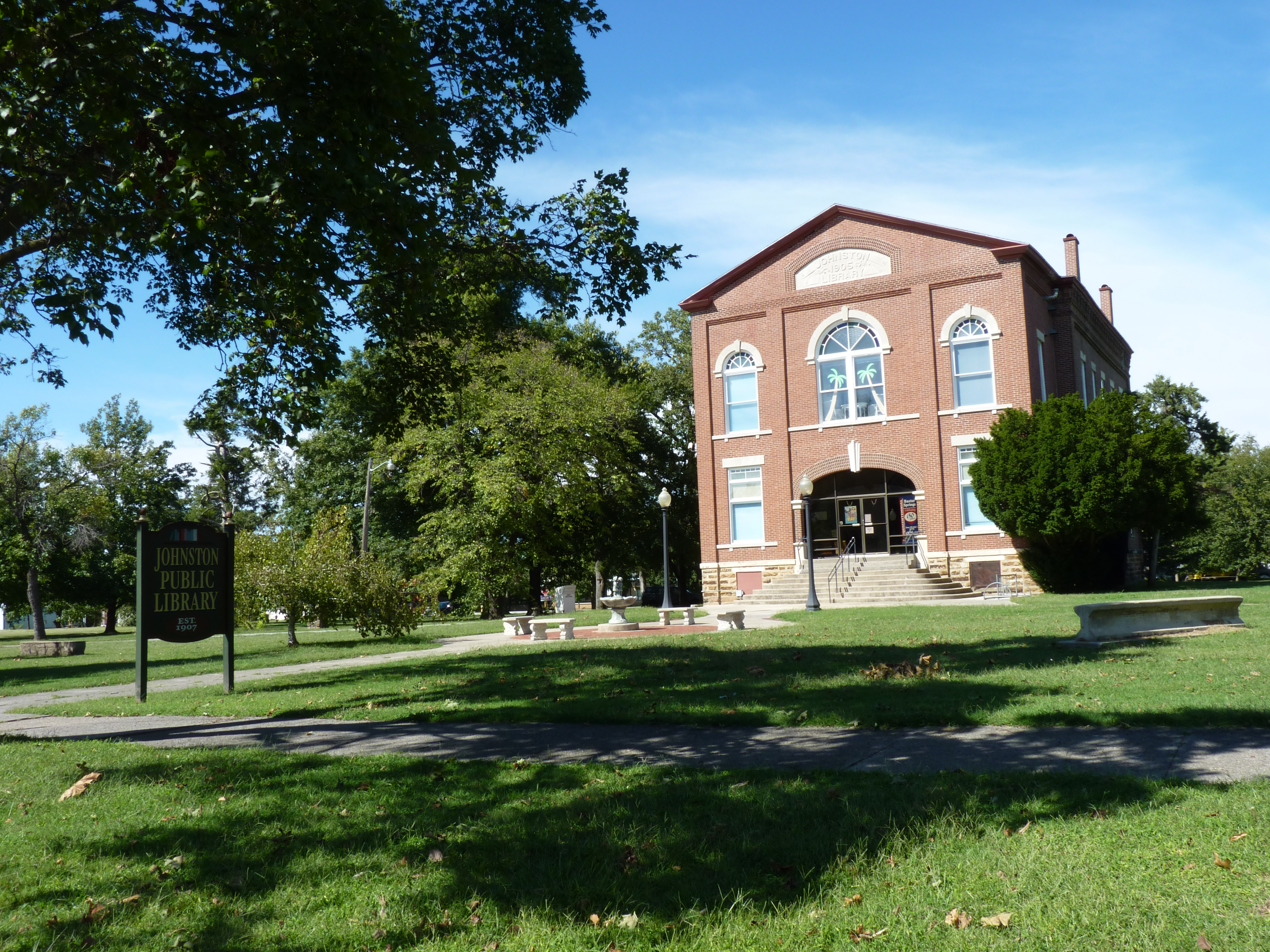
Johnston Public Library, 2010
