= K-101 (Kansas highway) =

State highway in Kansas, U.S.

K-101
- Delaware Avenue, Jackson Road
- K-101 highlighted in red

Route information
- Maintained by KDOT
- Length: 9.998 mi (16.090 km)
- Existed: May 26, 1937–present

Major junctions
- South end: US-166 south of Edna
- North end: US-160 west of Altamont

Location
- Country: United States
- State: Kansas
- Counties: Labette

Highway system
- Kansas State Highway System; Interstate; US; State; Spurs
← K-100	→ K-102

K-101 is a ten-mile-long (16 km) state highway in Labette County in the U.S. state of Kansas. The southern terminus is at U.S. Route 166 (US-166) south of Edna, and the northern terminus is at US-160 west of Altamont. K-101 mostly passes through farmland except the section within Edna.

When K-101 was first designated as a state highway in 1937, it was a short spur linking US-166 to Edna. In 1950, the highway was extended north to the Edna Cemetery. Then in 1954, it was extended to its current northern terminus, which at the time was K-96, now US-160.

== Route description ==
K-101's southern terminus is at an intersection with US-166 just south of Edna in Elm Grove Township. This is the location the Kansas Department of Transportation (KDOT) determined had the highest traffic count on average. The highway heads north and enters the city as Walnut Avenue at a former railroad track crossing. The roadway exits the city and follows Jackson Road as it passes by the Edna Cemetery.

K-101 proceeds north through farmland and crosses Hackberry Creek. The highway intersects 9000 Road before passing the former Edna Municipal Airport. K-101 crosses Richland Creek south of the intersection with US-160 west of Altamont in Mount Pleasant Township; this intersection marks the northern terminus of the state highway. This is the location KDOT determined had the lowest traffic count on average.

No section of K-101 is listed on the National Highway System, a network of roads important to the nation’s economy, defense, and mobility. However, it connects to the system at each terminus.

== History ==
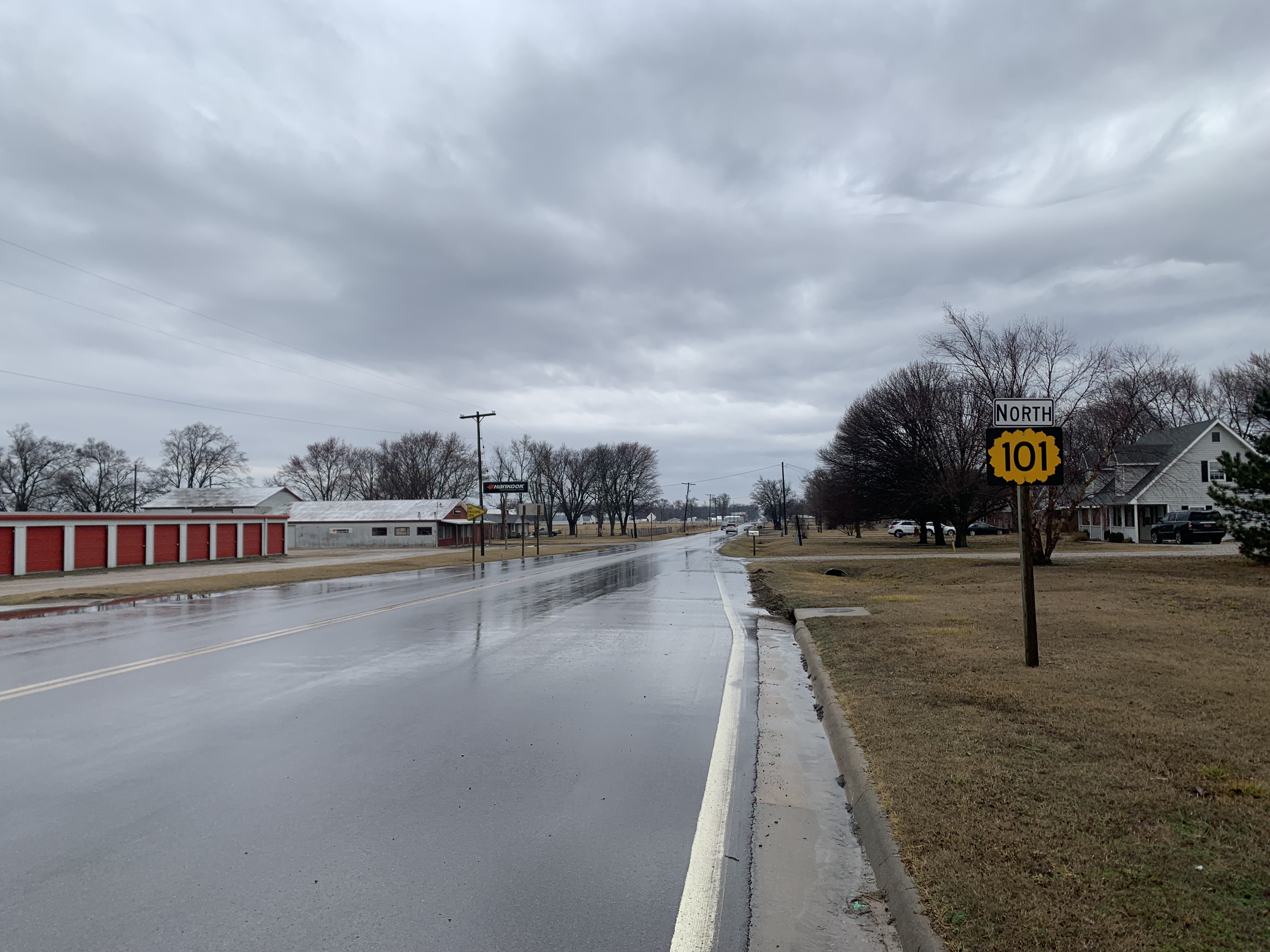
K-101 in Edna facing north

K-101 was first designated as a one-half-mile-long (0.80 km) state highway from US-166 north to Edna on May 26, 1937, by the Kansas State Highway Commission (SHC). On May 10, 1950, K-101 was extended northward to the Edna Cemetery.

In early 1954, the SHC proposed an extension of K-101 northward to K-96 (modern US-160) when the county had improved the road to state highway standards. By late April, the county had made the proper improvements to the roadway. Then on April 28, 1954, the highway was extended north. By July 1954, the SHC was near finishing grading work needed before paving the highway. The highway was paved by 1956.

In December 1978, a car was struck by a train but caused no injuries to the driver. In late January 1979, a meeting was held in Edna about the dangerous railroad crossing in the city. The meeting discussed the lack of signals and the numerous accidents that occurred. The city planned to widen the highway and add signals to the highway, but a vote was postponed due to opposition from two business owners concerned about the removal of parking spaces. Then on May 14, the Edna City Council approved a plan to widen the highway and to install crossing signals at the crossing. City officials also offered to help the business owners in construction of a new parking lot. On September 18, 1986, KDOT accepted bids for grading and surfacing of the highway at the crossing. The railroad tracks were abandoned in May 1997, and removed by 1999.

In late 1998, KDOT wanted to move US-160 to create a more uniform spacing of the east–west US routes in the southern part of the State and asked AASHTO for approval. Once approved on April 17, 1999, the department rerouted US-160 and truncated K-96. Since then, the intersecting highway at K-101's northern terminus has been US-160.

== Major intersections ==
The entire route is in Labette County.

Location	mi	km	Destinations	Notes
Elm Grove Township	0.000	0.000	US-166 (4000 Road) – Chetopa, Coffeyville	Southern terminus
Mount Pleasant Township	9.998	16.090	US-160 (14000 Road) – Independence, Oswego	Northern terminus
1.000 mi = 1.609 km; 1.000 km = 0.621 mi
