= Angola (disambiguation) =

Angola is a country in Southern Africa.

Angola may also refer to:

== Places ==
=== United States ===
- Angola, Delaware, a city in the state of Delaware
- Angola, Florida, a settlement founded by freedom-seeking peoples from 1812 until 1821 near Bradenton, Florida
- Angola, Indiana, a city in the state of Indiana
- Angola, Kansas, a city in the state of Kansas
- Angola, Michigan, a ghost town
- Angola, New York, a village in the state of New York near Buffalo
  - Angola Horror, an 1867 train wreck that occurred there
- Louisiana State Penitentiary (also known as "Angola"), a state penitentiary in West Feliciana Parish, Louisiana

=== Other places ===
- Kingdom of Ndongo, a historical Bantu kingdom
- Portuguese Angola, a historic Portuguese colonial territory

== Other uses ==
- Angola (shawl), an imitated cashmere shawl
- Angola, a derivation of Angora a very soft Angora wool
- Capoeira Angola, a style of the Afro-Brazilian martial art Capoeira
- Angola (Book of Mormon), a city in the Book of Mormon
- "Angola, Louisiana", a song from the 1978 album Secrets by Gil Scott-Heron and Brian Jackson
- Braian Angola (born 1994), Colombian basketball player in the Israeli Basketball Premier League
- Reytory Angola (c. 1626–1689), Black landowner in colonial New York
- Angola (wargame), a board game simulating the Angolan civil war

== See also ==
- Angolan (disambiguation)
