= Hackberry Township, Kansas =

Hackberry Township
- Township
- Location in Labette County
- Coordinates: 37°3′37″N 95°12′43″W
- Country: United States
- State: Kansas
- County: Labette

Area
  - Total: 50.812 sq mi (131.60 km^{2})
  - Land: 50.281 sq mi (130.23 km^{2})
  - Water: 0.531 sq mi (1.38 km^{2}) 1.05%

Population (2020)
  - Total: 402
  - Density: 8.00/sq mi (3.09/km^{2})
- Time zone: UTC-6 (CST)
  - Summer (DST): UTC-5 (CDT)
- Area code: 620

Hackberry Township is a township in Labette County, Kansas, United States. As of the 2020 census, its population was 402.

== Geography ==
Hackberry Township covers an area of 50.812 square miles (131.60 square kilometers).

=== Communities ===
- Bartlett

=== Adjacent townships ===
- Fairview Township, Labette County (north)
- Oswego Township, Labette County (northeast)
- Richland Township, Labette County (east)
- Elm Grove Township, Labette County (west)
- Mount Pleasant Township, Labette County (northwest)

=== Major highways ===
- US 166
