= Canada Township =

Canada Township may refer to:

- Township (Canada), a type of subdivision in certain parts of Canada
- Canada Township, Labette County, Kansas, in Labette County, Kansas
- Canada Township, Jackson County, North Carolina, in Jackson County, North Carolina
