= Mound Valley =

Mound Valley may refer to:

- Mound Valley, Idaho, unincorporated community in Franklin County, Idaho
- Mound Valley (Idaho), valley in Franklin County, Idaho
- Mound Valley, Kansas
- Mound Valley Township, Labette County, Kansas
