= Mortimer, Kansas =

Ghost town in Labette County, Kansas

- Ghost town
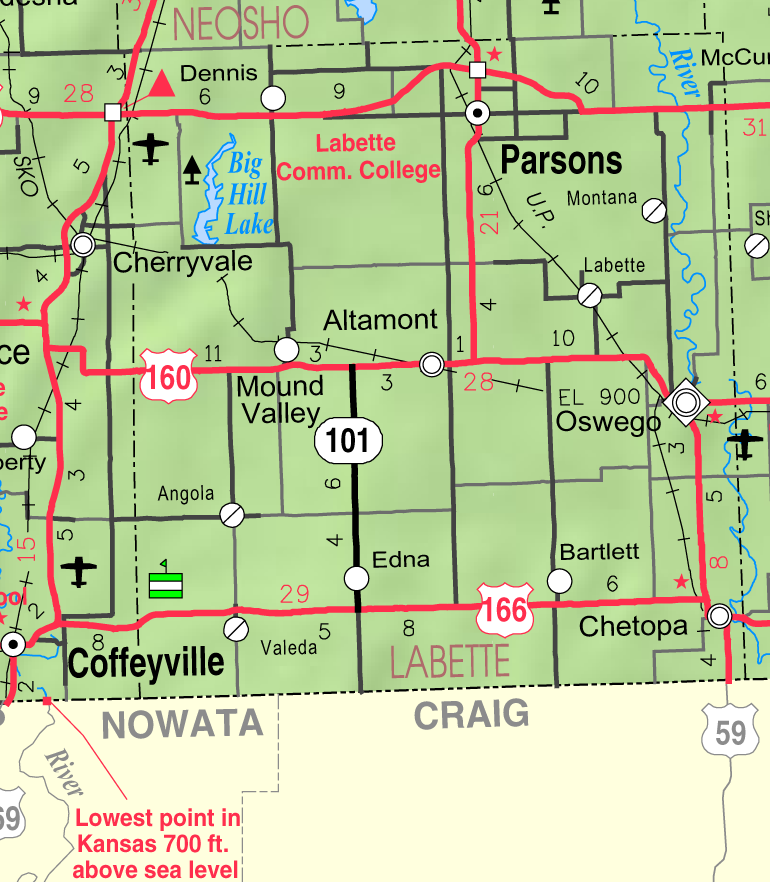
- KDOT map of Labette County (legend)

- Location within Kansas Location within the United States
- Coordinates: 37°19′27″N 95°29′11″W
- Country: United States
- State: Kansas
- County: Labette
- Township: Osage
- Founded: 1883
- Named for: Emanuel Mortimer

Area
  - Total: 0.077 sq mi (0.2 km^{2})
  - Land: 0.077 sq mi (0.2 km^{2})
  - Water: 0 sq mi (0.0 km^{2})
- Elevation: 895 ft (273 m)

Population
  - Total: 0
- Time zone: UTC-6 (CST)
  - Summer (DST): UTC-5 (CDT)
- Area code: 620

Mortimer is a ghost town in Osage Township, Labette County, Kansas, United States.

== History ==
The community was founded by Emanuel "Governor" Mortimer (son of revolutionary war patriot Famous Mortimer), a lawyer originally from Kentucky who came to Kansas with his family on a wagon train from Illinois in 1868 when the Osage Ceded Lands were opened to settlement following the American Civil War. Governor Mortimer filed a claim on a homestead in the Northeast Quarter of Section 25, Township 31 South, Range 17 East, just south of Bender's mounds near the Labette/Montgomery County Line. When the Memphis, Kansas and Colorado Railroad set to work extending their tracks from Parsons to Cherryvale in 1880, the route ran directly through Governor Mortimer's property. He seized the opportunity, and on January 7, 1883, he filed a plat for the town of Mortimer, which would be situated directly adjacent to the railroad right-of-way. The community layout comprised four blocks, with sixteen lots in each block, for a total of 64 lots. The streets from north to south were Main Street, First Street, and Second Street; and the streets from west to east were Front Street, Lane Avenue, and Union Avenue. The community immediately began to grow, and by the end of 1884 had several business. Governor Mortimer and his sons operated the grain elevator, which shipped 15 to 18 train cars of grain per week, and an average of 150 cars per harvest season. The post office was established in February 1883.

The Cherryvale newspaper reported in April 1884 that Mortimer had a grain elevator, railroad freight house, railroad passenger depot, post office, general store, drug store, doctor's office, blacksmith shop, and an architect/builder. The railroad built a section house, constructing it from two box cars connected in the shape of a "T". Mortimer became an important shipping and supply point on the railroad for many goods, but especially grain and livestock. The Carpenter school pre-dated the community, but was renamed Mortimer School. Church services were originally held at the school until June 5, 1892 when Mortimer Brethren Church was dedicated by Senior Bishop Nicholas Castle. A new grain elevator was erected by N. Sauer Milling Company in 1918.

The heyday of the community was from the mid-1880s until the 1910s. The site was vacated by the Labette County Board of Commissioners on March 7, 1917. The church burned down on October 17, 1931. The grain elevator, railroad depot, section house, freight house, scales, and stock yards remained for many decades and the former town site was known as "Mortimer Station". One by one, the houses were dismantled and relocated to other surrounding towns. Eventually the depot was torn down, and all that remained was a platform and a sign with the former town's name on either side. Mortimer was downgraded to a flag stop. The railroad eventually ended passenger service on the line in the 1960s. The tracks were soon abandoned between Dennis and Cherryvale and all grain shipping operations were transferred to Dennis and the grain elevator was later torn down. Although the community no longer exists, the location is still known locally as "Mortimer Corner".
