= Osage Township, Labette County, Kansas =

Township in Labette County, Kansas, U.S.

Osage Township
- Township
- Location in Labette County
- Coordinates: 37°19′26″N 95°27′15″W
- Country: United States
- State: Kansas
- County: Labette

Area
  - Total: 62.591 sq mi (162.11 km^{2})
  - Land: 60.649 sq mi (157.08 km^{2})
  - Water: 1.942 sq mi (5.03 km^{2}) 3.10%

Population (2020)
  - Total: 968
  - Density: 16.0/sq mi (6.16/km^{2})
- Time zone: UTC-6 (CST)
  - Summer (DST): UTC-5 (CDT)
- Area code: 620

Osage Township is a township in Labette County, Kansas, United States. As of the 2020 census, its population was 968.

== Geography ==
Osage Township covers an area of 62.591 square miles (162.11 square kilometers).

=== Communities ===
- Dennis

=== Adjacent townships ===
- Shiloh Township, Neosho County (north)
- Ladore Township, Neosho County (northeast)
- Walton Township, Labette County (east)
- Labette Township, Labette County (southeast)
- Mound Valley Township, Labette County (south)
- Cherry Township, Montgomery County (west)

=== Major highways ===
- US 400
- US 169
