= K101 =

K101 or K-101 may refer to:

- K-101 (Kansas highway), a state highway in Kansas
- KIOI, a radio station
