= Howard Township, Labette County, Kansas =

Howard Township
- Township
- Location in Labette County
- Coordinates: 37°2′30″N 95°26′26″W
- Country: United States
- State: Kansas
- County: Labette

Area
  - Total: 42.916 sq mi (111.15 km^{2})
  - Land: 42.859 sq mi (111.00 km^{2})
  - Water: 0.057 sq mi (0.15 km^{2}) 0.13%

Population (2020)
  - Total: 347
  - Density: 8.10/sq mi (3.13/km^{2})
- Time zone: UTC-6 (CST)
  - Summer (DST): UTC-5 (CDT)
- Area code: 620

Howard Township is a township in Labette County, Kansas, United States. As of the 2020 census, its population was 347.

== Geography ==
Howard Township covers an area of 42.916 square miles (111.15 square kilometers).

=== Adjacent townships ===
- Canada Township, Labette County (north)
- Elm Grove Township, Labette County (east)
- Cherokee Township, Montgomery County (west)

=== Major highways ===
- US 166
