= Cherokee Township, Montgomery County, Kansas =

Township in Montgomery County, Kansas, U.S.

Cherokee Township
- Township
- Location within Montgomery County
- Coordinates: 37.06182°N 95.564022°W
- Country: United States
- State: Kansas
- County: Montgomery

Area
  - Total: 36.439 sq mi (94.38 km^{2})
  - Land: 36.439 sq mi (94.38 km^{2})
  - Water: 0 sq mi (0 km^{2}) 0%

Population (2020)
  - Total: 415
  - Density: 11.4/sq mi (4.40/km^{2})
- Time zone: UTC-6 (CST)
  - Summer (DST): UTC-5 (CDT)
- Area code: 620

Cherokee Township is a township in Montgomery County, Kansas, United States. As of the 2020 census, its population was 415.

== Geography ==
Cherokee Township covers an area of 36.439 square miles (94.38 square kilometers). The Verdigris River flows through it.

=== Adjacent townships ===
- Liberty Township, Montgomery County (north)
- Canada Township, Labette County (northeast)
- Howard Township, Labette County (east)
- Parker Township, Montgomery County (west)

=== Major highways ===
- US-166
- US-169
