= Angolan =

Angolan may refer to:

- Something of, from, or related to Angola
- Angolan people; see Demographics of Angola
- Angolan culture
- Angolar Creole
- Something of, from, or related to the historical Bantu Kingdom of Ndongo
- A resident of:
  - Angola, New York
  - Angola, Kansas

== See also ==
- List of Angolans
- Languages of Angola
- Angola (disambiguation)
- Angolanidade ("Angolan-ness")
