= Elm Grove Township, Kansas =

Elm Grove Township
- Township
- Location in Labette County
- Coordinates: 37°3′40″N 95°19′11″W
- Country: United States
- State: Kansas
- County: Labette

Area
  - Total: 50.248 sq mi (130.14 km^{2})
  - Land: 49.846 sq mi (129.10 km^{2})
  - Water: 0.402 sq mi (1.04 km^{2}) 0.8%

Population (2020)
  - Total: 682
  - Density: 13.7/sq mi (5.28/km^{2})
- Time zone: UTC-6 (CST)
  - Summer (DST): UTC-5 (CDT)
- Area code: 620
- GNIS ID: 469175

Elm Grove Township is a township in Labette County, Kansas, United States. As of the 2020 census, its population was 682.

== Geography ==
Elm Grove Township covers an area of 50.248 square miles (130.14 square kilometers).

=== Communities ===
- Edna

=== Adjacent townships ===
- Mount Pleasant Township, Labette County (north)
- Fairview Township, Labette County (northeast)
- Hackberry Township, Labette County (east)
- Howard Township, Labette County (west)
- Canada Township, Labette County (northwest)

=== Major highways ===
- US 166
