= Richland Township, Labette County, Kansas =

Township in Labette County, Kansas, U.S.

Richland Township
- Township
- Location in Labette County
- Coordinates: 37°3′22″N 95°6′52″W
- Country: United States
- State: Kansas
- County: Labette

Area
  - Total: 37.623 sq mi (97.44 km^{2})
  - Land: 37.122 sq mi (96.15 km^{2})
  - Water: 0.501 sq mi (1.30 km^{2}) 1.33%

Population (2020)
  - Total: 332
  - Density: 8.94/sq mi (3.45/km^{2})
- Time zone: UTC-6 (CST)
  - Summer (DST): UTC-5 (CDT)
- Area code: 620

Richland Township is a township in Labette County, Kansas, United States. As of the 2020 census, its population was 332.

== Geography ==
Richland Township covers an area of 37.623 square miles (97.44 square kilometers).

=== Adjacent townships ===
- Oswego Township, Labette County (north)
- Lola Township, Cherokee County (northeast)
- Neosho Township, Cherokee County (east)
- Hackberry Township, Labette County (west)
- Fairview Township, Labette County (northwest)

=== Major highways ===
- US 59
- US 166
