= Fairview Township, Labette County, Kansas =

Fairview Township
- Township
- Location in Labette County
- Coordinates: 37°9′29″N 95°13′53″W
- Country: United States
- State: Kansas
- County: Labette

Area
  - Total: 36.257 sq mi (93.91 km^{2})
  - Land: 35.991 sq mi (93.22 km^{2})
  - Water: 0.266 sq mi (0.69 km^{2}) 0.73%

Population (2020)
  - Total: 284
  - Density: 7.89/sq mi (3.05/km^{2})
- Time zone: UTC-6 (CST)
  - Summer (DST): UTC-5 (CDT)
- Area code: 620
- GNIS ID: 478496

Fairview Township is a township in Labette County, Kansas, United States. As of the 2020 census, its population was 284.

== Geography ==
Fairview Township covers an area of 36.257 square miles (93.91 square kilometers).

=== Communities ===
- Part of Altamont

=== Adjacent townships ===
- Liberty Township, Labette County (north)
- Montana Township, Labette County (northeast)
- Oswego Township, Labette County (east)
- Richland Township, Labette County (southeast)
- Hackberry Township, Labette County (south)
- Elm Grove Township, Labette County (southwest)
- Mount Pleasant Township, Labette County (west)
- Labette Township, Labette County (northwest)

=== Major highways ===
- US 59
