= Canada Township, Kansas =

Canada Township
- Township
- Location in Labette County
- Coordinates: 37°6′45″N 95°27′2″W
- Country: United States
- State: Kansas
- County: Labette

Area
  - Total: 39.906 sq mi (103.36 km^{2})
  - Land: 39.818 sq mi (103.13 km^{2})
  - Water: 0.088 sq mi (0.23 km^{2}) 0.2%

Population (2020)
  - Total: 205
  - Density: 5.15/sq mi (1.99/km^{2})
- Time zone: UTC-6 (CST)
  - Summer (DST): UTC-5 (CDT)
- Area code: 620
- GNIS ID: 469195

Canada Township is a township in Labette County, Kansas, United States. As of the 2020 census, its population was 205.

== Geography ==
Canada Township covers an area of 39.906 square miles (103.36 square kilometers).

=== Communities ===
- Angola

=== Adjacent townships ===
- Mound Valley Township, Labette County (north)
- Mount Pleasant Township, Labette County (northeast)
- Elm Grove Township, Labette County (southeast)
- Howard Township, Labette County (south)
- Liberty Township, Montgomery County (northwest)
- Cherokee Township, Montgomery County (southwest)
