= Parker Township, Kansas =

Township in Montgomery County, Kansas, U.S.

Parker Township
- Township
- Location within Montgomery County
- Coordinates: 37.087075°N 95.651913°W
- Country: United States
- State: Kansas
- County: Montgomery

Area
  - Total: 25.31 sq mi (65.6 km^{2})
  - Land: 25.215 sq mi (65.31 km^{2})
  - Water: 0.095 sq mi (0.25 km^{2}) 0.38%

Population (2020)
  - Total: 1,077
  - Density: 42.71/sq mi (16.49/km^{2})
- Time zone: UTC-6 (CST)
  - Summer (DST): UTC-5 (CDT)
- Area code: 620

Parker Township is a township in Montgomery County, Kansas, United States. As of the 2020 census, its population was 1,077.

== Geography ==
Parker Township covers an area of 25.31 square miles (65.6 square kilometers). The Verdigris River flows through it.

=== Adjacent townships ===
- Liberty Township, Montgomery County (north)
- Cherokee Township, Montgomery County (east)
- Fawn Creek Township, Montgomery County (west)
- Independence Township, Montgomery County (northwest)

=== Major highways ===
- US-169
