= Labette Township, Kansas =

Labette Township
- Township
- Location in Labette County
- Coordinates: 37°15′2″N 95°19′25″W
- Country: United States
- State: Kansas
- County: Labette

Area
  - Total: 36.491 sq mi (94.51 km^{2})
  - Land: 36.249 sq mi (93.88 km^{2})
  - Water: 0.242 sq mi (0.63 km^{2}) 0.66%

Population (2020)
  - Total: 366
  - Density: 10.1/sq mi (3.90/km^{2})
- Time zone: UTC-6 (CST)
  - Summer (DST): UTC-5 (CDT)
- Area code: 620

Labette Township is a township in Labette County, Kansas, United States. As of the 2020 census, its population was 366.

== Geography ==
Labette Township covers an area of 36.491 square miles (94.51 square kilometers).

=== Communities ===
- Part of Altamont

=== Adjacent townships ===
- Walton Township, Labette County (north)
- North Township, Labette County (northeast)
- Liberty Township, Labette County (east)
- Fairview Township, Labette County (southeast)
- Mount Pleasant Township, Labette County (south)
- Mound Valley Township, Labette County (southwest)
- Osage Township, Labette County (northwest)

=== Major highways ===
- US 59
