= Mound Valley Township, Kansas =

Township in Labette County, Kansas, U.S.

Mound Valley Township
- Township
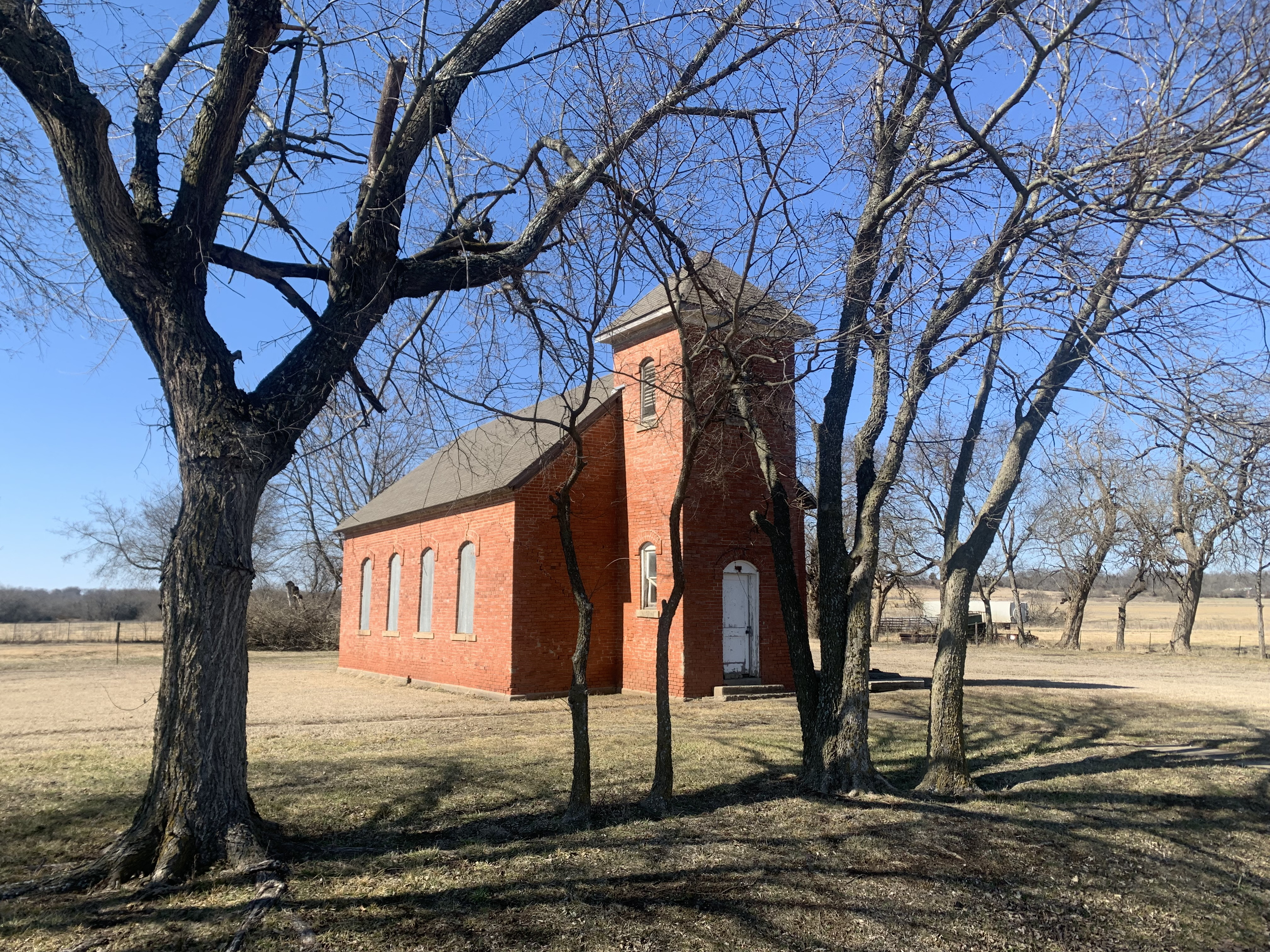
- Historic Church in Mound Valley Township (2026)

- Location in Labette County
- Coordinates: 37°12′30″N 95°27′01″W
- Country: United States
- State: Kansas
- County: Labette

Area
  - Total: 64.199 sq mi (166.27 km^{2})
  - Land: 64.126 sq mi (166.09 km^{2})
  - Water: 0.073 sq mi (0.19 km^{2}) 0.11%

Population (2020)
  - Total: 720
  - Density: 11/sq mi (4.3/km^{2})
- Time zone: UTC-6 (CST)
  - Summer (DST): UTC-5 (CDT)
- Area code: 620

Mound Valley Township is a township in Labette County, Kansas, United States. As of the 2020 census, its population was 720.

== Geography ==
Mound Valley Township covers an area of 64.199 square miles (166.27 square kilometers).

=== Communities ===
- Mound Valley

=== Adjacent townships ===
- Osage Township, Labette County (north)
- Labette Township, Labette County (northeast)
- Mount Pleasant Township, Labette County (southeast)
- Canada Township, Labette County (south)
- Liberty Township, Montgomery County (southwest)
- Drum Creek Township, Montgomery County (west)
- Cherry Township, Montgomery County (northwest)

=== Major highways ===
- US 160

== Gallery ==
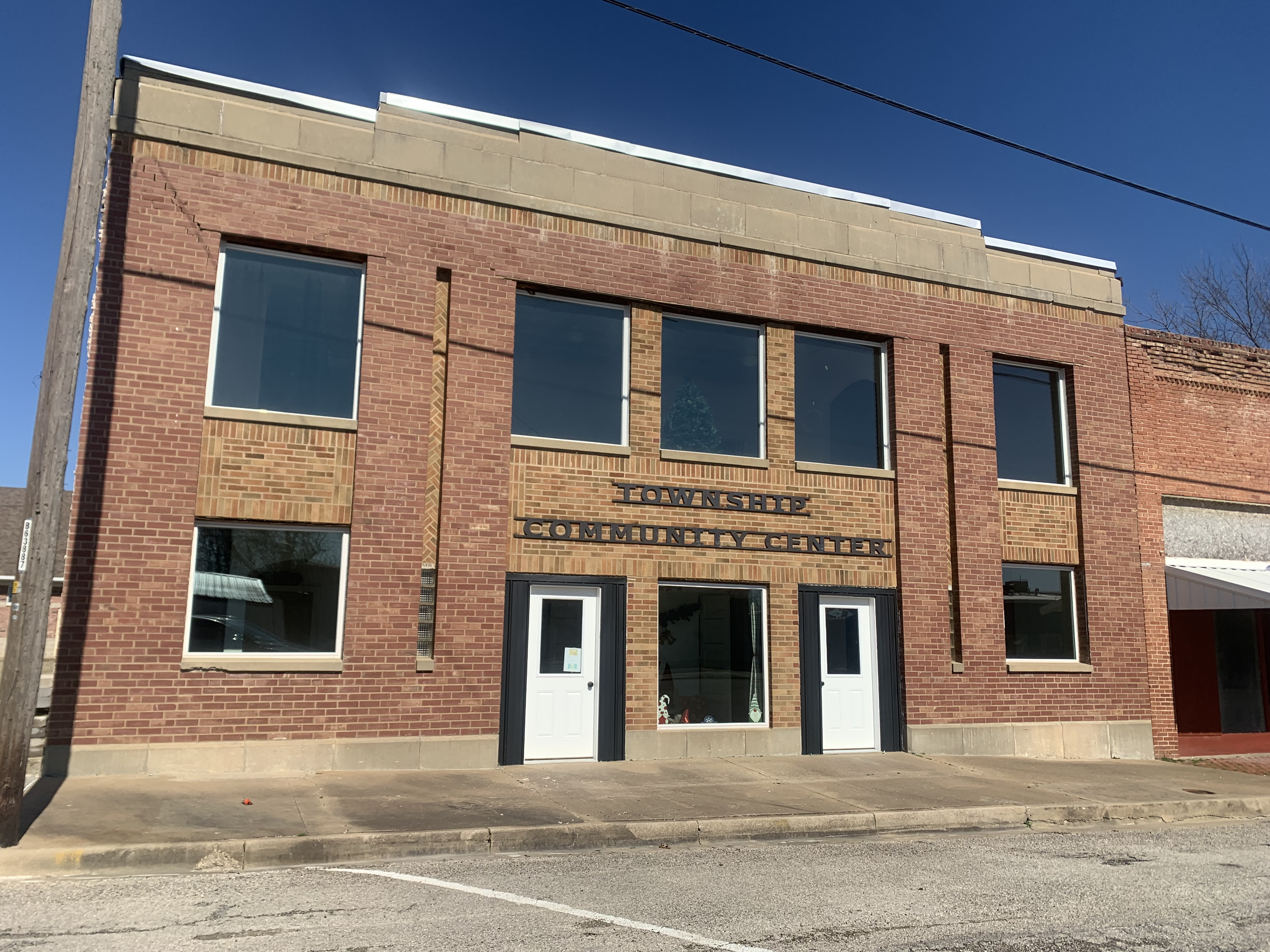
Township Community Center in Mound Valley Township (2026)
