= Oswego Township, Kansas =

Township in Labette County, Kansas, U.S.

Oswego Township
- Township
- Location in Labette County
- Coordinates: 37°8′36″N 95°8′12″W
- Country: United States
- State: Kansas
- County: Labette

Area
  - Total: 25.439 sq mi (65.89 km^{2})
  - Land: 24.891 sq mi (64.47 km^{2})
  - Water: 0.548 sq mi (1.42 km^{2}) 2.15%

Population (2020)
  - Total: 330
  - Density: 13/sq mi (5.1/km^{2})
- Time zone: UTC-6 (CST)
  - Summer (DST): UTC-5 (CDT)
- Area code: 620

Oswego Township is a township in Labette County, Kansas, United States. As of the 2020 census, its population was 330.

== Geography ==
Osage Township covers an area of 25.439 square miles (56.89 square kilometers).

=== Communities ===
- Oswego (separate from the township)

=== Adjacent townships ===
- Montana Township, Labette County (north)
- Sheridan Township, Cherokee County (northeast)
- Lola Township, Cherokee County (east)
- Neosho Township, Cherokee County (southeast)
- Richland Township, Labette County (south)
- Hackberry Township, Labette County (southwest)
- Fairview Township, Labette County (west)
- Liberty Township, Labette County (northwest)

=== Major highways ===
- US 160
- US 59
