= Valeda, Kansas =

Unincorporated community in Labette County, Kansas

- Unincorporated community
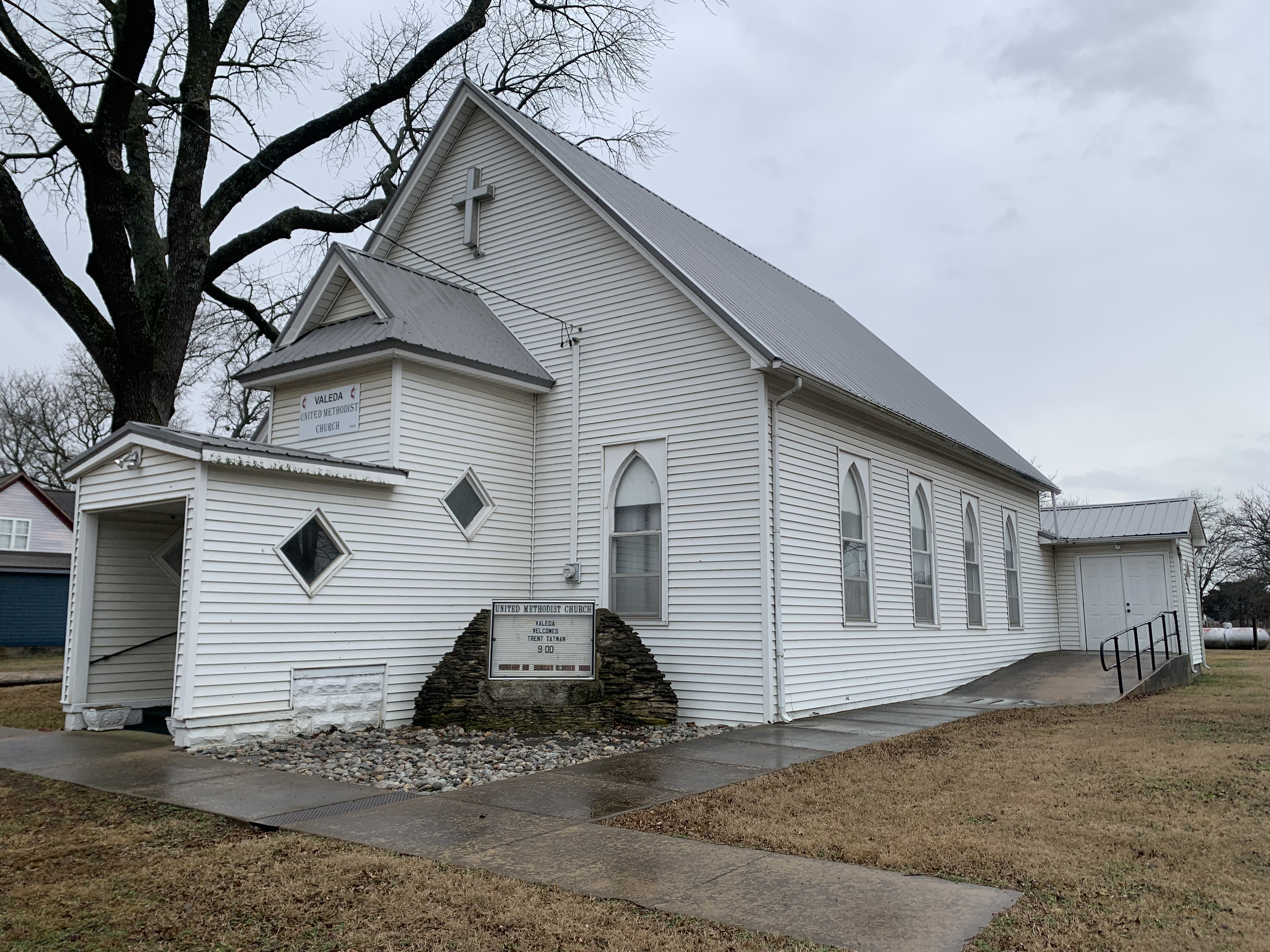
- Valeda United Methodist Church (2026)

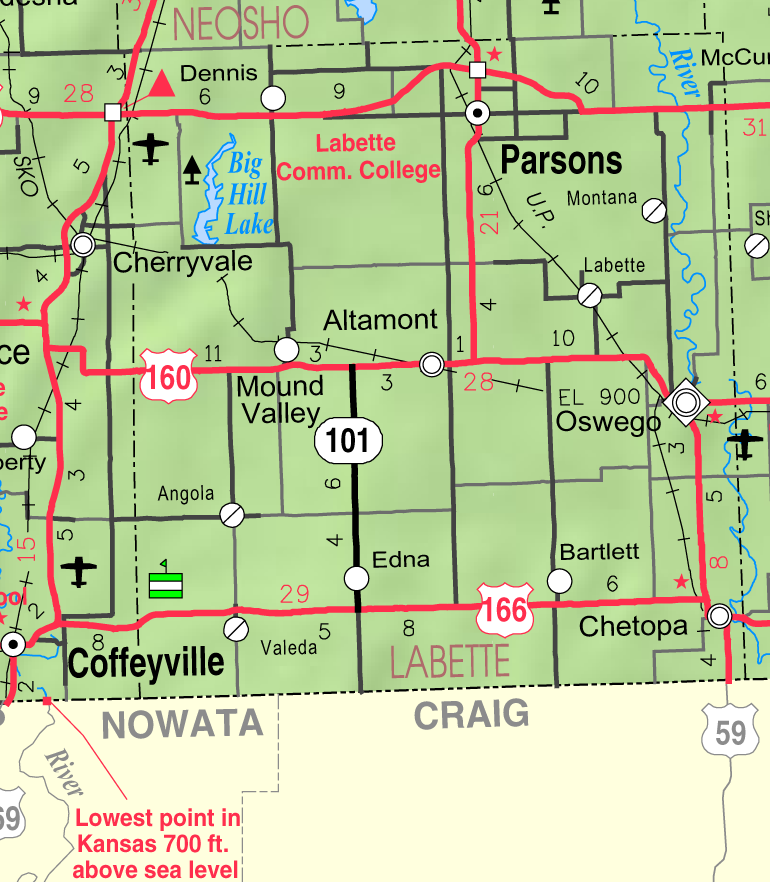
- KDOT map of Labette County (legend)

- Location within Kansas Location within the United States
- Coordinates: 37°02′50″N 95°26′51″W
- Country: United States
- State: Kansas
- County: Labette
- Founded: 1880s
- Platted: 1886
- Elevation: 860 ft (260 m)
- Time zone: UTC-6 (CST)
  - Summer (DST): UTC-5 (CDT)
- Area code: 620
- FIPS code: 20-72700
- GNIS ID: 469169

Valeda is an unincorporated community in Labette County, Kansas, United States.

== History ==
Valeda was platted in 1886.
