= Liberty Township, Montgomery County, Kansas =

Township in Montgomery County, Kansas, U.S.

Liberty Township
- Township
- Location within Montgomery County
- Coordinates: 37.160088°N 95.600519°W
- Country: United States
- State: Kansas
- County: Montgomery

Area
  - Total: 43.642 sq mi (113.03 km^{2})
  - Land: 43.56 sq mi (112.8 km^{2})
  - Water: 0.082 sq mi (0.21 km^{2}) 0.19%

Population (2020)
  - Total: 511
  - Density: 11.7/sq mi (4.53/km^{2})
- Time zone: UTC-6 (CST)
  - Summer (DST): UTC-5 (CDT)
- Area code: 620

Liberty Township is a township in Montgomery County, Kansas, United States. As of the 2020 census, its population was 511.

== Geography ==
Liberty Township covers an area of 43.642 square miles (113.03 square kilometers). The Verdigris River flows through it.

=== Communities ===
- Liberty

=== Adjacent townships ===
- Drum Creek Township, Montgomery County (north)
- Mound Valley Township, Labette County (northeast)
- Canada Township, Labette County (southeast)
- Cherokee Township, Montgomery County (south)
- Parker Township, Montgomery County (south-southwest)
- Fawn Creek Township, Montgomery County (southwest)
- Independence Township, Montgomery County (west)

=== Major highways ===
- US-160
- US-169
