= Labette County USD 506 =

Public school district in Altamont, Kansas

Address
- 401 S. High School St. Altamont, Kansas, 67330; United States
- Coordinates: 37.191°N 95.290°W

District information
- Type: Public
- Grades: K to 12

Other information
- Website: usd506.org

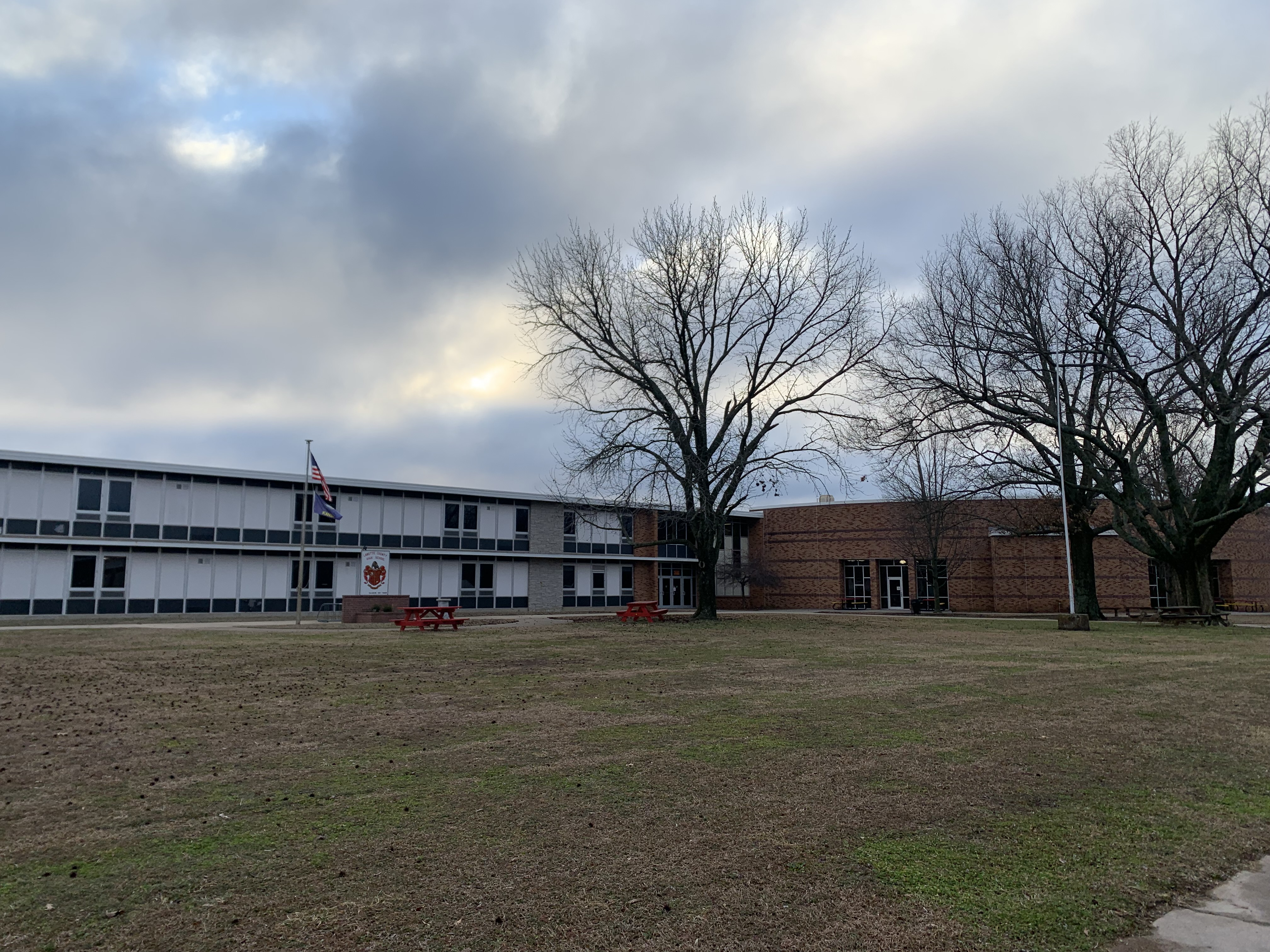
Labette County High School in Altamont (2026)

Labette County USD 506 is a public unified school district headquartered in Altamont, Kansas, United States. The district includes the communities of Altamont, Angola, Bartlett, Dennis, Edna, Labette, Mound Valley, western and southern Parsons, and nearby rural areas.

== Schools ==
There are five rural grade schools located in Altamont, Edna, Bartlett, Mound Valley, and an area southwest of Parsons called Meadow View. Labette County High School (LCHS) is located in Altamont. Grades 9-12 have a consistent enrollment of about 500 students. Since its founding in 1895, the school has prided itself on career, vocational, and technical training. LCHS has an agriculture department that includes a school farm. It also has an automotive technology department that completes both in-house projects as well as services for the community. LCHS has a building and trades department, one of the only electronics departments, a certified welding shop, a family/career science department, and a business-technology department. LCHS also runs a cafe in Altamont when school is in session called the Grizzly Grind. It is run by the Business Classes with contributions from its Culinary Arts program as well.

Labette County High School is considered a class 4A school and offers the KHSAA sports of: football, volleyball, cross country, basketball, wrestling, tennis, golf, baseball, softball, and track & field. LCHS has an award-winning theatre department and fine arts that include choir, band, 2D & 3D art classes. The school offers a variety of extra- and intra-curricular activities including: National FFA, FBLA (Future Business Leaders of America), FCCLA (Family, Career and Community Leaders of America), Skills USA, and ITS (International Thespian Society). Also, LCHS has a math club, a stage band, a chess club, SADD (Students Against Destructive Decisions), and FCA (Fellowship of Christian Athletes).

Schools

- Labette County High School
- Altamont Grade School
- Bartlett Grade School
- Edna Grade School
- Meadow View Grade School
- Mound Valley Grade School

== See also ==
- Kansas State Department of Education
- Kansas State High School Activities Association
- List of high schools in Kansas
- List of unified school districts in Kansas
