= Angola (wargame) =

Board game

- Cover of the first edition, 1988
- Publishers: Ragnar Brothers, Multi-Man Publishing
- Publication: 1988
- Website: https://mmpgamers.com/index.php?main_page=product_info&cPath=18&products_id=107

Angola is a board wargame published in 1988 by Ragnar Brothers of Huddersfield UK that simulates the Angolan Civil War.

== Background ==
Immediately following Angola's declaration of independence from Portugal in 1975, civil war broke out between several factions, and eventually became a Cold War proxy conflict, with various forms of intervention by the United States, the Soviet Union, Cuba, and South Africa.

== Contents ==
Angola is a 4-player wargame in which the wars fought in the 1970s to control Angola are depicted. The game is a bit more complex than the average board wargame, containing a large hex grid map, numerous counters and 2 decks of cards.

== Publication history ==
Angola was designed by Phil Kendall, and was published in 1988 by the British publisher Ragnar Brothers, based in Huddersfield, Yorkshire. In 2012, Multi-Man Publishing (MMP) acquired the rights to the game and published a second edition of the game with new cover art by Lee Brimmicombe-Wood.

== Awards ==
In 2012, the second edition of Angola published by MMP was a finalist for a Charles S. Roberts Award in the category Best Post-WW2 Era Board Wargame.

== Reception ==
In Issue 2 of Games International, Mike Siggins liked the game, commenting that "While Angola, as it stands, isn't going to put Huddersfield or the Ragnars on the boardgaming map, it is nevertheless a brave and competent first effort and good value at the price." Siggins concluded by giving the game an average rating of 3 stars out of 5.

In the February 2015 issue of Club de Strategia, Alejandro Farnese admired the components of the game, saying, "The map is beautiful, in very sober earth tones [...] The counters are colorful (no less expected from Africa) [...] The cards are well finished." Farnese liked the simple game mechanics and the random turn order, saying "So you don't know until the last moment in which order your orders will be executed. And from there it is chaos. What you had decided to do to take advantage of the last impulse of your previous turn can no longer be done and you have to start plugging the new gaps that your opponents have made for you." He concluded that Angola was "an agile and very fun game to play [...] You never really know what is going to happen or what ground you are stepping on, but it is one of those games that you keep thinking about days later because at the end of each turn you always know that you could have chosen something better."
