= Mount Pleasant Township, Labette County, Kansas =

Township in Labette County, Kansas, U.S.

Mount Pleasant Township
- Township
- Location in Labette County
- Coordinates: 37°9′56″N 95°19′11″W
- Country: United States
- State: Kansas
- County: Labette

Area
  - Total: 36.23 sq mi (93.8 km^{2})
  - Land: 35.963 sq mi (93.14 km^{2})
  - Water: 0.267 sq mi (0.69 km^{2}) 0.74%

Population (2020)
  - Total: 1,268
  - Density: 35.26/sq mi (13.61/km^{2})
- Time zone: UTC-6 (CST)
  - Summer (DST): UTC-5 (CDT)
- Area code: 620

Mount Pleasant Township is a township in Labette County, Kansas, United States. As of the 2020 census, its population was 1,268.

== Geography ==
Mount Pleasant Township covers an area of 64.199 square miles (166.27 square kilometers).

=== Communities ===
- Altamont

=== Adjacent townships ===
- Labette Township, Labette County (north)
- Liberty Township, Labette County (northeast)
- Fairview Township, Labette County (east)
- Hackberry Township, Labette County (southeast)
- Elm Grove Township, Labette County (south)
- Canada Township, Labette County (southwest)
- Mound Valley Township, Labette County (northwest)

=== Major highways ===
- US 160
- US 59
