= U.S. Route 166 =

Highway in the United States

U.S. Route 166
- US 166 highlighted in red

Route information
- Auxiliary route of US 66
- Maintained by KDOT and MoDOT
- Length: 164.159 mi (264.188 km)
- Existed: 1926–present

Major junctions
- West end: US-81 in South Haven, KS
- I-35 / Kansas Turnpike east of South Haven, KS; US-77 in Arkansas City, KS; K-15 in eastern Cowley County, KS; K-99 south of Sedan, KS; US-75 north of Caney; US-169 in Coffeyville, KS; US-59 in Chetopa, KS; US-69 west of Baxter Springs, KS; US 69 Alt. in Baxter Springs, KS; US-400 east of Baxter Springs, KS
- East end: I-44 / US 400 in Joplin, MO

Location
- Country: United States
- States: Kansas, Missouri
- Counties: KS: Sumner, Cowley, Chautauqua, Montgomery, Labette, Cherokee; MO: Newton

Highway system
- United States Numbered Highway System; List; Special; Divided
- Kansas State Highway System; Interstate; US; State; Spurs
- Missouri State Highway System; Interstate; US; State; Supplemental
← K-163	KS	→ K-167
← Route 165	MO	→ Route 168

U.S. Route 166 (US 166) is a 164-mile (264 km) east–west United States highway. This route and US 266 are the only two remaining spurs of historic U.S. Route 66 (which was decommissioned in 1985), since US 666 was renumbered to US 491 in 2003.

US 166 meets the old route of US 66, now designated US 69 Alternate, in Baxter Springs in the southeast corner of Kansas.

== Route description ==
Lengths
	mi	km
KS	163.223	262.682
MO	0.936	1.506
Total	164.159	264.188

=== Kansas ===
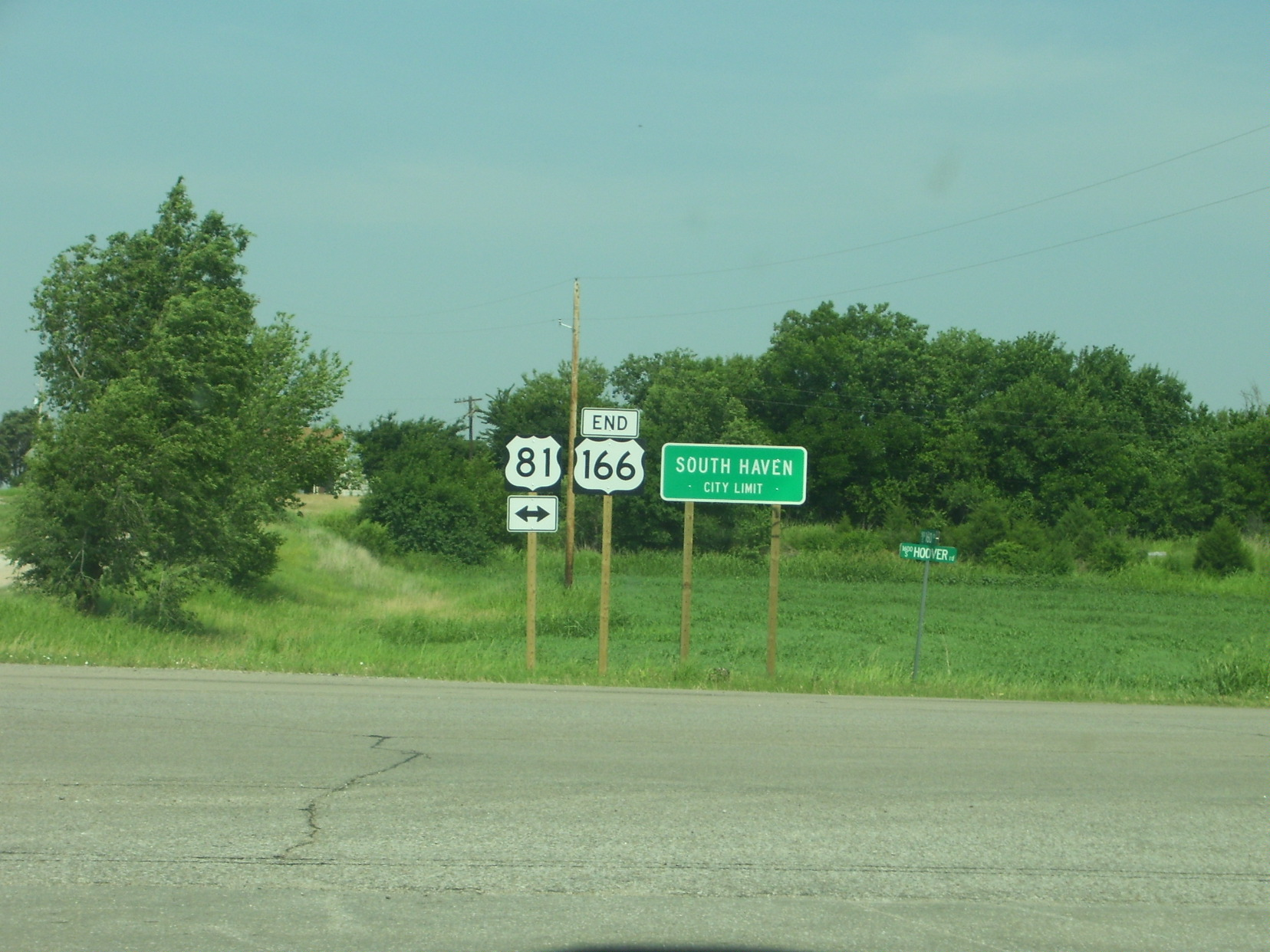
US-166's western terminus in South Haven, Kansas

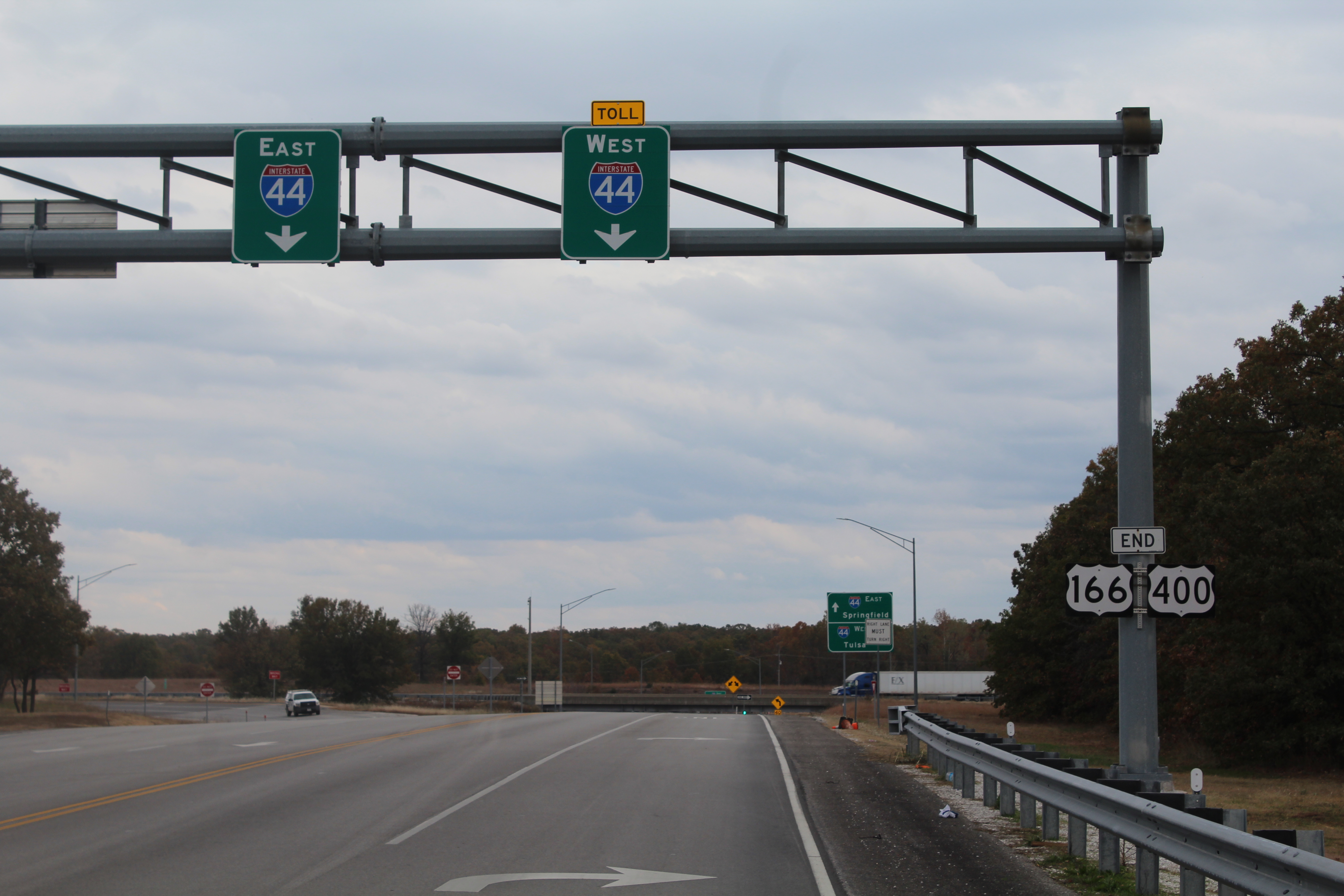
US 166's eastern terminus approaching I-44 in Newton County, Missouri

US 166 is an east–west highway that meanders about 164 miles (264 km) along the Kansas–Oklahoma state line. The highway's western terminus is in South Haven, Kansas at an intersection with US 81, approximately 1-mile (1.6 km) north of the northern terminus of US 177. US 166's eastern terminus, which is also shared by US 400, is an intersection with I-44 just inside the Missouri state line, near the point where Kansas, Oklahoma, and Missouri meet, southwest of Joplin, Missouri near Loma Linda, MO.

About 4 miles (6.4 km) east from its intersection with US 81, the highway intersects with the Kansas Turnpike (I-35) at exit 4. Continuing east about 16 miles (26 km), US 166 crosses the Arkansas River into Arkansas City, where it runs concurrently with US 77 for approximately 2 miles (3.2 km), splitting off near Parkerfield.

Traveling 50 miles (80 km) east of Arkansas City, US 166 turns northeast, arcing above Cowley County Lake Dam and Cedar Vale. US. 166 crosses the Caney River approximately 0.5 miles (0.80 km) east of Chautauqua County Road 2. It turns south of Sedan approximately 0.6 miles (0.97 km) east of Chautauqua County Road 14. A business loop connects the main US 166 route with Sedan.

Continuing east from Sedan, about 34 miles (55 km) to Coffeyville, US 166 skims through Peru and Niotaze, US 166 crosses the Little Caney River 1.1 miles (1.77 km) to the east of Niotaze and proceeds east to the junction of US 75 near Havana. The two routes turn south for a 3-mile (4.8 km) concurrency. US 166 splits off just north of Caney turning east again through Tyro to Coffeyville. US 166 has a brief concurrency with US 169 beginning at the intersection of Walnut/Paterson Streets and Eleventh Street on the south side of downtown Coffeyville. The highway proceeds east on Eleventh Street, curves to the northeast and becomes Northeast Street. It then proceeds northeasterly past Walter Johnson Park and the Montgomery County Fairgrounds before it crosses the Verdigris River. US 166 will exit from US 169 0.4 miles (0.64 km) east of the Verdigris River and proceeds east toward the town of Chetopa

US 166 runs eastward about 50 miles (80 km) from Coffeyville bypassing Edna and Bartlett. US 166 passes through Chetopa, where US 166 and US 59 travel concurrently from 0.2 miles (0.32 km) east of the BNSF Railroad overpass, and proceeds south on Eleventh Street, then turns to the east near the Chetopa ball field. US 166/US 59 will run concurrently along Maple Street into downtown Chetopa. US 59 will then break off on Third Street and proceeds south towards the Kansas-Oklahoma state linesouth of the intersection. Leaving Chetopa, US 166 crosses over the Neosho River and crosses US 69 Alternate, 6 miles (9.7 km) before Baxter Springs.

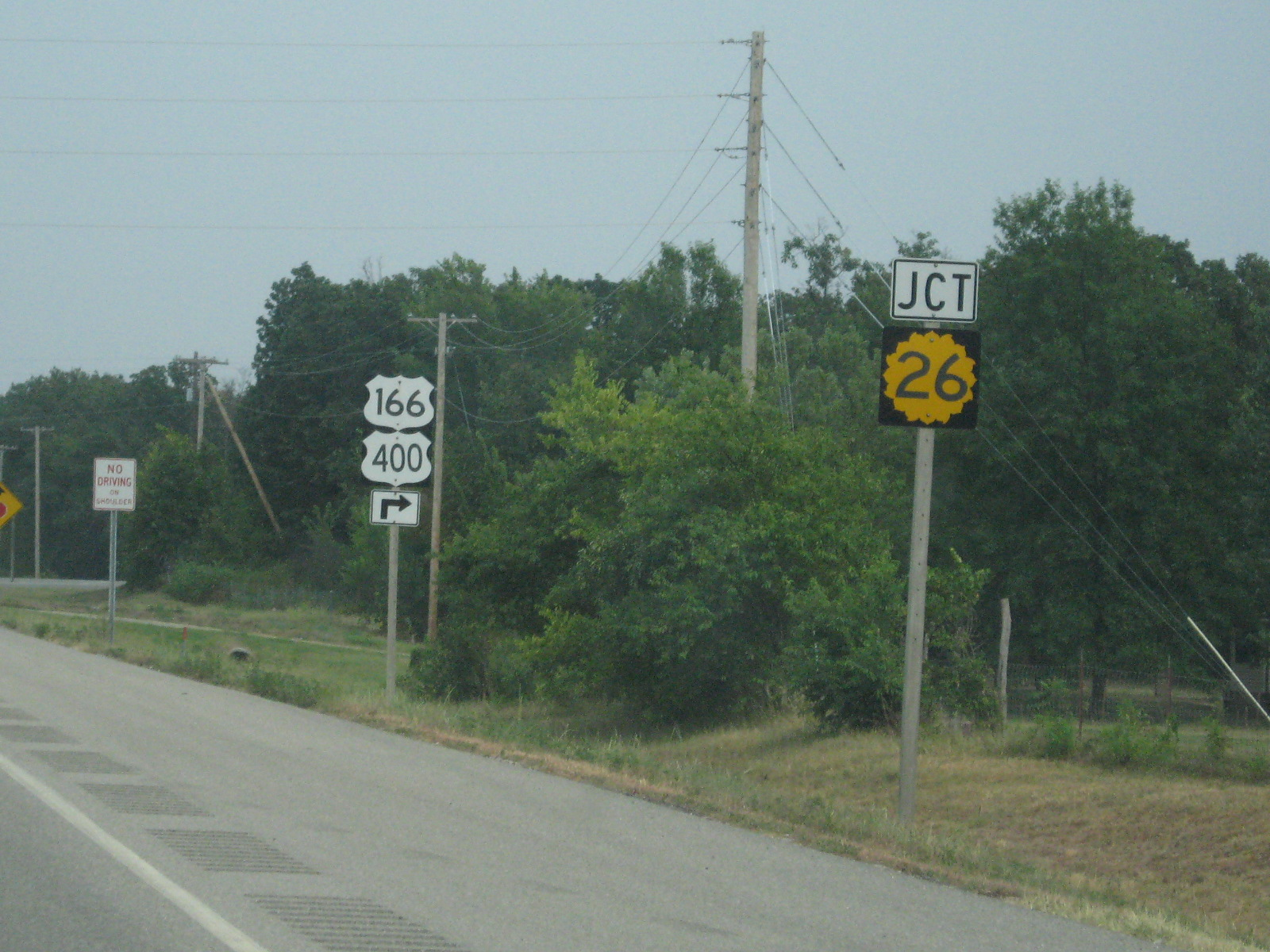
US 166 and US 400 at the terminus of K-26

Heading east from Baxter Springs, US 166 crosses the Spring River. Approximately 2 miles (3.2 km) later, US 166 intersects with US 400. US 166/US 400 then turn sharply southeast for 6 miles (9.7 km) to cross the Missouri state line approximately 1/2 mile (0.80 km) from the I-44 interchange.

=== Missouri ===
US 166's eastern terminus is its interchange with I-44, 0.6 miles (0.97 km) from the state line and about 1,000 feet (300 m) from the Oklahoma–Kansas–Missouri tripoint.

== History ==
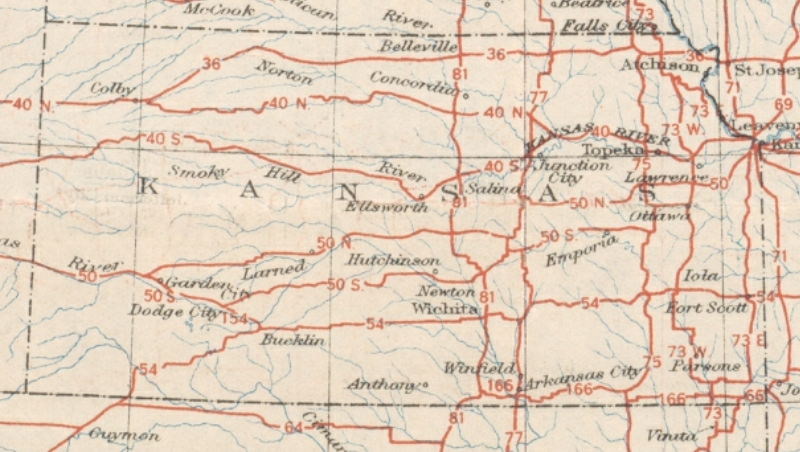
A map of Kansas's U.S. Highways as laid out in 1926

US 166 is an original 1926 route and originally ran from South Haven to Baxter Springs, Kansas. In 1945, it was extended east through Joplin, Missouri, where it paralleled US 66 to Springfield. This extension absorbed Route 38, which had been formed in 1922 from Carthage to west of Springfield and realigned to Joplin in about 1930, with the former route becoming Route 38N and soon US 71 Alternate. In 1966, following the completion of the last section of I-44 in Missouri, the east end of US 166 was truncated back from Springfield to its current terminus. Most sections of US 166 between Joplin and Springfield were not upgraded to Interstate Highway standards and were renumbered as I-44 Business Loops, state highways (such as Route 174) or turned over to local or county jurisdiction.

In a resolution on December 22, 1993, KDOT approved and requested to realign US-166 south of Sedan, and to re-designate the former alignment as US-166 Business. This request was approved by AASHTO in a meeting on April 10, 1994.

== Major intersections ==
State	County	Location	mi	km	Destinations	Notes
Kansas	Sumner		0.000	0.000	US-81 – South Haven, Wellington	Western terminus; road continues as 160th Street South
Kansas	Sumner		3.481	5.602	I-35 Toll / Kansas Turnpike – Wichita, Oklahoma City	I-35/Kansas Tpke. exit 4
Kansas	Cowley	Arkansas City	20.540	33.056	US-77 south (Summit Street south) – Ponca City Ok.	Western end of US-77 concurrency
Kansas	Cowley	Arkansas City	22.993	37.004	US-77 north (Walnut Valley Green Way) / Kansas Avenue – Winfield	Eastern end of US-77 concurrency; US-77 north serves South Central Kansas Medical Center
Kansas	Cowley		40.883	65.795	K-15 north – Dexter	Western end of K-15 concurrency
Kansas	Cowley		44.833	72.152	K-15 south – Shidler Ok.	Eastern end of K-15 concurrency
Kansas	Chautauqua		66.984	107.800	US 166 Bus. east – Sedan	Western terminus of US-166 Bus.
Kansas	Chautauqua		71.325	114.786	US 166 Bus. west / K-99 – Sedan, Chautauqua	Eastern terminus of US-166 Bus.
Kansas	Montgomery		85.579	137.726	US-75 north – Independence	Western end of US-75 concurrency; interchange
Kansas	Montgomery		88.577	142.551	US-75 south (McGee Street) – Caney	Eastern end of US-75 concurrency
Kansas	Montgomery	Coffeyville	106.083	170.724	US-169 south (Walnut Street) – Nowata Ok.	Western end of US-169 concurrency
Kansas	Montgomery		108.104	173.977	US-169 north – Chanute	Eastern end of US-169 concurrency; interchange
Kansas	Labette	Edna	120.743	194.317	K-101 north (Delaware Street) – Edna	Southern terminus of K-101
Kansas	Labette	Chetopa	135.054	217.348	US-59 north (Xavier Road)	Western end of US-59 concurrency
Kansas	Labette	Chetopa	136.548	219.753	US-59 south (3rd Street)	Eastern end of US-59 concurrency
Kansas	Cherokee		150.694	242.518	US-69 / K-7 – Columbus, Miami Okla.	
Kansas	Cherokee	Baxter Springs	156.181	251.349	US 69 Alt. (Military Avenue)	Former US-66
Kansas	Cherokee		158.017	254.304	US-400 west – Parsons	Western end of US-400 concurrency
Kansas	Cherokee		161.322	259.623	K-26 north – Galena	Southern terminus of K-26
			163.223 0.000	262.682 0.000	Kansas–Missouri line	
Missouri	Newton		0.406– 0.936	0.653– 1.506	US 400 ends / I-44 – Tulsa, Springfield	Eastern end of US 400 concurrency; I-44 exit 1; eastern termini of US 166 and US 400; eastbound access to S. Outer Road
1.000 mi = 1.609 km; 1.000 km = 0.621 mi: Concurrency terminus

== Special routes ==
=== Sedan business loop ===
U.S. Highway 166 Business
- Location: Sedan
- Length: 7.378 mi (11.874 km)
- Existed: April 10, 1994–present

U.S. Route 166 Business (US-166 Bus.) is a 7.378-mile-long (11.874 km) business route of US-166 that serves the city of Sedan. US-166 Bus. begins at US-166 southwest of Sedan and begins travelling northeast. The highway soon crosses Middle Caney Creek and continues northeast. It then intersects K-99 and begins to follow it east. The two routes cross Deer Creek and then enters Sedan as Main Street. US-166 Business and K-99 then turn south onto School Street and soon exit the city. The two routes cross Middle Caney Creek once again as they continue south. After roughly 2.7 miles (4.3 km), US-166 Bus. intersects US-166 and ends, as K-99 continues south towards Chautauqua. In a December 22, 1993 resolution, KDOT approved and requested to realign US-166 south of Sedan, and to re-designate the former alignment as US-166 Business. This request was approved by AASHTO in an April 10, 1994 meeting.

Major intersections
The entire route is in Chautauqua County.

Location	mi	km	Destinations	Notes
Belleville Township	0.000	0.000	US-166	Western terminus
Sedan Township	3.364	5.414	K-99 north – Howard	Western end of K-99 overlap
Summit Township	7.378	11.874	US-166 – Coffeyville, Arkansas City K-99 south – Chautauqua	Eastern terminus; eastern end of K-99 overlap
1.000 mi = 1.609 km; 1.000 km = 0.621 mi: Concurrency terminus

=== Joplin ===
- U.S. Route 166 Business – Joplin, Missouri (decommissioned)

=== Springfield ===
- U.S. Route 166 Business – Springfield, Missouri (decommissioned)
- U.S. Route 166 City - Springfield, Missouri (decommissioned)
- U.S. Route 166 Truck - Springfield, Missouri (decommissioned)
