= Dennis, Kansas =

Unincorporated community in Labette County, Kansas

- CDP
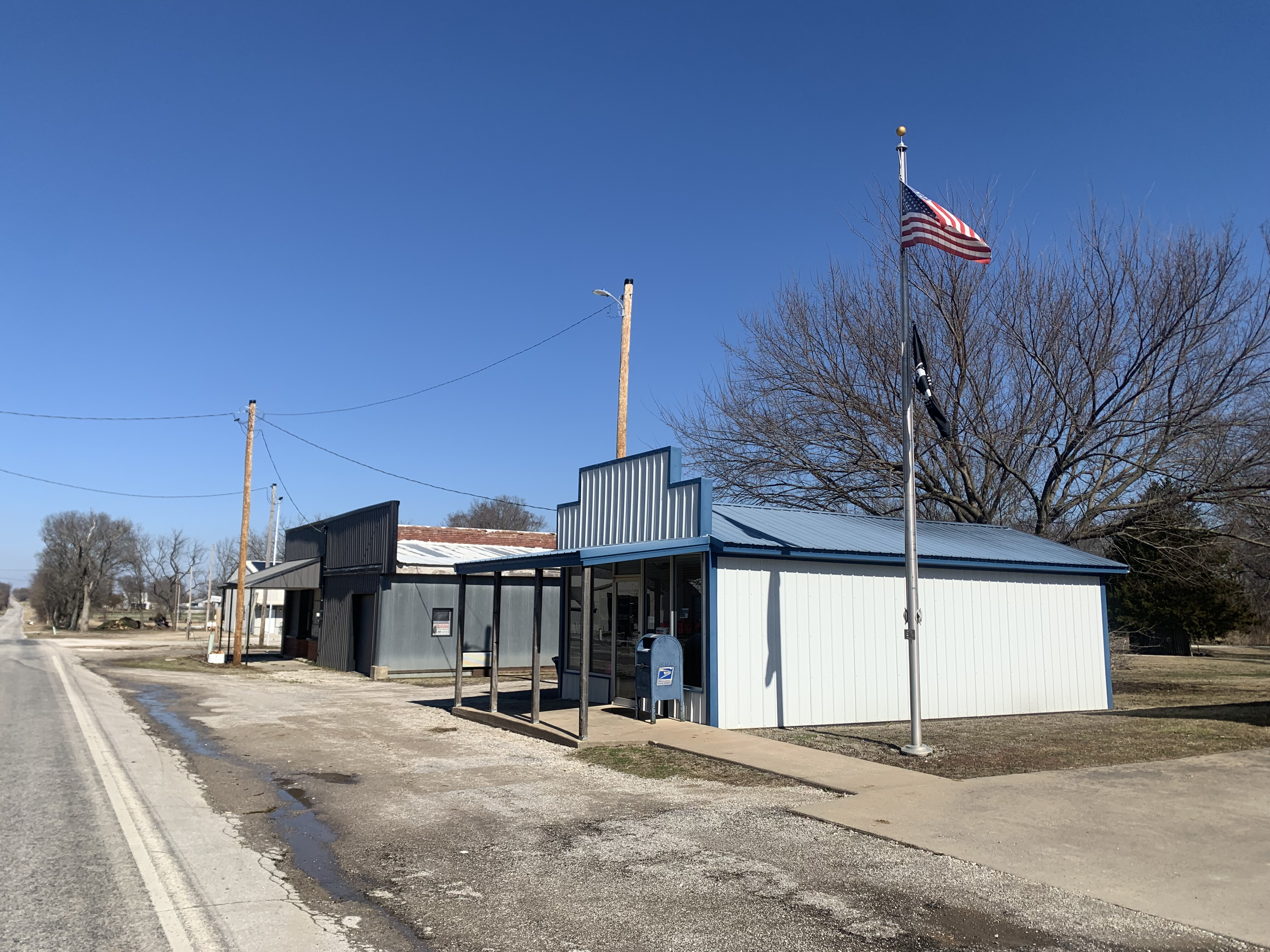
- Downtown Dennis (2026)

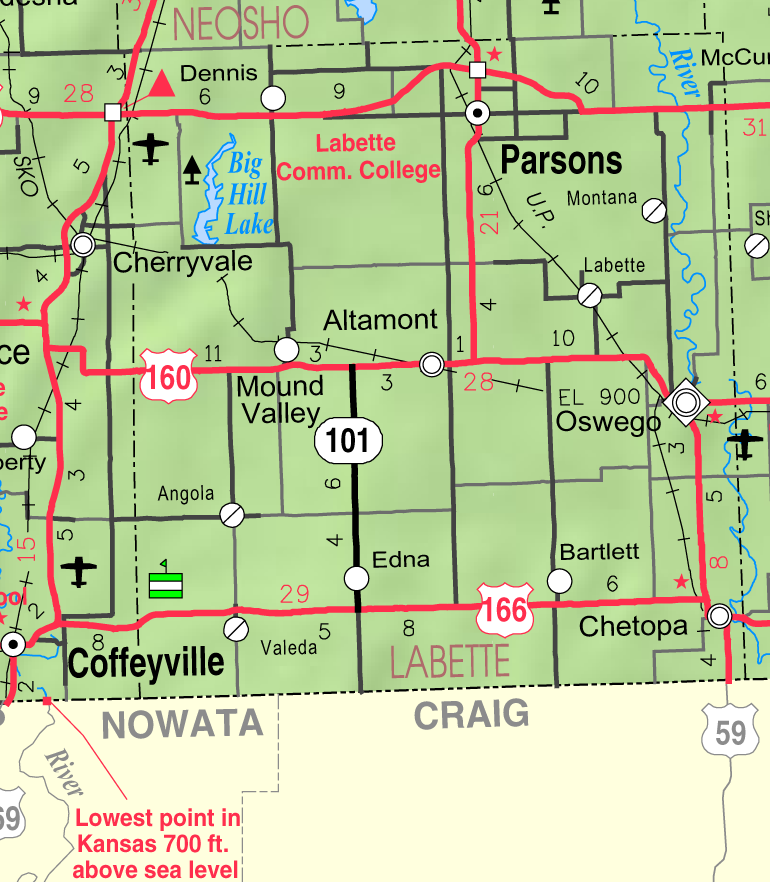
- KDOT map of Labette County (legend)

- Location within Kansas Location within the United States
- Coordinates: 37°20′49″N 95°24′46″W
- Country: United States
- State: Kansas
- County: Labette
- Founded: 1880s
- Elevation: 929 ft (283 m)

Population (2020)
  - Total: 152
- Time zone: UTC-6 (CST)
  - Summer (DST): UTC-5 (CDT)
- Area code: 620
- FIPS code: 20-17675
- GNIS ID: 2804492

Dennis is a census-designated place (CDP) in Labette County, Kansas, United States. As of the 2020 census, the population was 152.

== History ==
Dennis had its start in the early 1880s by the building of the Memphis, Kansas and Colorado Railroad through that territory. The first post office in Dennis was established in May 1881.

The nearby Big Hill Archeological District is on the National Register of Historic Places.

== Demographics ==
Historical population
| Census | Pop. | Note | %± |
|---|---|---|---|
| 2020 | 152 | | — |
U.S. Decennial Census

== Education ==
The community is served by Labette County USD 506 public school district.

== See also ==
- Big Hill Lake
