= Mound Valley, Kansas =

City in Labette County, Kansas

- City
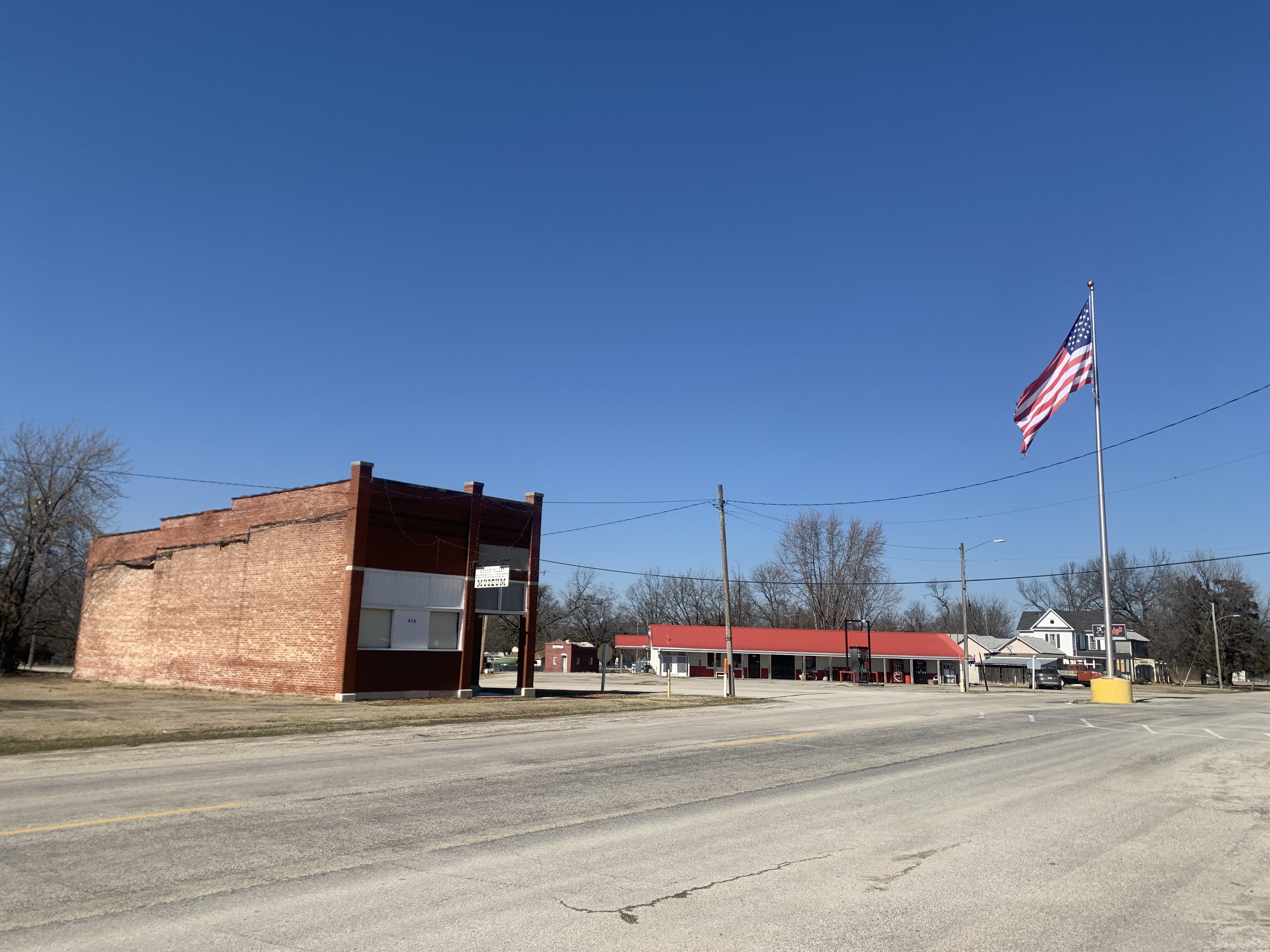
- Mound Valley downtown (2026)

- Location within Labette County and Kansas

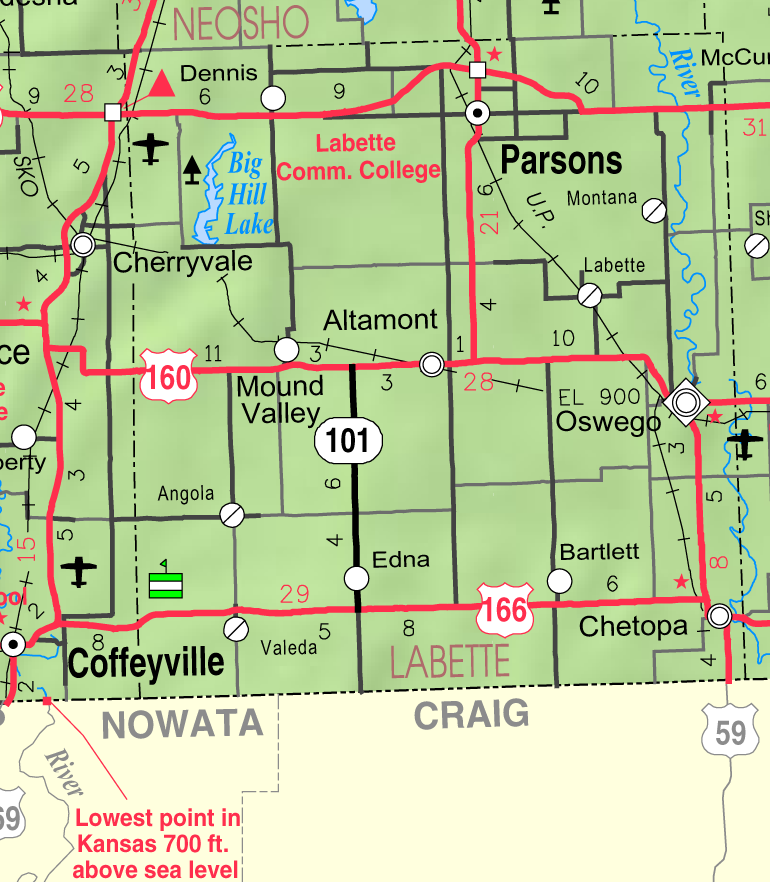
- KDOT map of Labette County (legend)
- Coordinates: 37°12′22″N 95°24′15″W
- Country: United States
- State: Kansas
- County: Labette
- Founded: 1869
- Incorporated: 1871

Area
  - Total: 0.64 sq mi (1.66 km^{2})
  - Land: 0.64 sq mi (1.66 km^{2})
  - Water: 0 sq mi (0.00 km^{2})
- Elevation: 833 ft (254 m)

Population (2020)
  - Total: 348
  - Density: 543/sq mi (210/km^{2})
- Time zone: UTC-6 (CST)
  - Summer (DST): UTC-5 (CDT)
- ZIP Code: 67354
- Area code: 620
- FIPS code: 20-48825
- GNIS ID: 469430
- Website: moundvalleyks.com

Mound Valley is a city in Labette County, Kansas, United States. As of the 2020 census, the population of the city was 348.

== History ==
Mound Valley was founded in 1869. It was named from mound-like hills in the vicinity.

The first post office in Mound Valley was established in May 1870. Mound Valley was incorporated as a city in 1871. The town was a stop on the Missouri-Kansas-Texas railroad line from 1886 until the 1970s, and was also served by the Frisco Railroad and is currently served by the South Kansas and Oklahoma Railroad, which operates on the Frisco's former tracks.

== Geography ==
Mound Valley is located at 37°12′22″N 95°24′15″W (37.206173, -95.404231). According to the United States Census Bureau, the city has a total area of 0.65 square miles (1.68 km^{2}), all land.

=== Climate ===
The climate in this area is characterized by hot, humid summers and generally mild to cool winters. According to the Köppen Climate Classification system, Mound Valley has a humid subtropical climate, abbreviated "Cfa" on climate maps.

== Demographics ==
Historical population
Census	Pop.	Note	%±
1880	138		—
1890	545		294.9%
1900	533		−2.2%
1910	956		79.4%
1920	803		−16.0%
1930	666		−17.1%
1940	648		−2.7%
1950	566		−12.7%
1960	481		−15.0%
1970	467		−2.9%
1980	381		−18.4%
1990	405		6.3%
2000	418		3.2%
2010	407		−2.6%
2020	348		−14.5%
U.S. Decennial Census

=== 2020 census ===
The 2020 United States census counted 348 people, 152 households, and 95 families in Mound Valley. The population density was 542.1 per square mile (209.3/km^{2}). There were 167 housing units at an average density of 260.1 per square mile (100.4/km^{2}). The racial makeup was 86.21% (300) white or European American (85.92% non-Hispanic white), 0.29% (1) black or African-American, 1.44% (5) Native American or Alaska Native, 0.0% (0) Asian, 0.0% (0) Pacific Islander or Native Hawaiian, 0.29% (1) from other races, and 11.78% (41) from two or more races. Hispanic or Latino of any race was 3.74% (13) of the population.

Of the 152 households, 30.3% had children under the age of 18; 42.1% were married couples living together; 34.2% had a female householder with no spouse or partner present. 35.5% of households consisted of individuals and 13.8% had someone living alone who was 65 years of age or older. The average household size was 2.2 and the average family size was 2.7. The percent of those with a bachelor's degree or higher was estimated to be 4.6% of the population.

27.0% of the population was under the age of 18, 6.3% from 18 to 24, 22.7% from 25 to 44, 29.0% from 45 to 64, and 14.9% who were 65 years of age or older. The median age was 40.3 years. For every 100 females, there were 102.3 males. For every 100 females ages 18 and older, there were 111.7 males.

The 2016–2020 5-year American Community Survey estimates show that the median household income was $43,542 (with a margin of error of +/- $20,620) and the median family income was $65,833 (+/- $27,498). Males had a median income of $38,750 (+/- $12,648) versus $25,139 (+/- $3,183) for females. The median income for those above 16 years old was $27,500 (+/- $5,402). Approximately, 12.2% of families and 15.7% of the population were below the poverty line, including 14.0% of those under the age of 18 and 6.4% of those ages 65 or over.

=== 2010 census ===
As of the census of 2010, there were 407 people, 170 households, and 105 families residing in the city. The population density was 626.2 inhabitants per square mile (241.8/km^{2}). There were 202 housing units at an average density of 310.8 per square mile (120.0/km^{2}). The racial makeup of the city was 92.9% White, 2.2% Native American, 0.7% from other races, and 4.2% from two or more races. Hispanic or Latino of any race were 2.2% of the population.

There were 170 households, of which 28.2% had children under the age of 18 living with them, 43.5% were married couples living together, 13.5% had a female householder with no husband present, 4.7% had a male householder with no wife present, and 38.2% were non-families. 32.4% of all households were made up of individuals, and 14.1% had someone living alone who was 65 years of age or older. The average household size was 2.39 and the average family size was 2.99.

The median age in the city was 40.8 years. 25.1% of residents were under the age of 18; 6.4% were between the ages of 18 and 24; 22.9% were from 25 to 44; 28% were from 45 to 64; and 17.7% were 65 years of age or older. The gender makeup of the city was 49.9% male and 50.1% female.

=== 2000 census ===
As of the census of 2000, there were 418 people, 168 households, and 115 families residing in the city. The population density was 636.5 inhabitants per square mile (245.8/km^{2}). There were 190 housing units at an average density of 289.3 per square mile (111.7/km^{2}). The racial makeup of the city was 94.26% White, 2.15% Native American, 1.67% from other races, and 1.91% from two or more races. Hispanic or Latino of any race were 1.91% of the population.

There were 168 households, out of which 35.1% had children under the age of 18 living with them, 52.4% were married couples living together, 11.9% had a female householder with no husband present, and 31.5% were non-families. 30.4% of all households were made up of individuals, and 16.7% had someone living alone who was 65 years of age or older. The average household size was 2.49 and the average family size was 3.05.

In the city, the population was spread out, with 27.5% under the age of 18, 10.5% from 18 to 24, 27.3% from 25 to 44, 21.5% from 45 to 64, and 13.2% who were 65 years of age or older. The median age was 36 years. For every 100 females, there were 85.8 males. For every 100 females age 18 and over, there were 83.6 males.

The median income for a household in the city was $23,542, and the median income for a family was $35,481. Males had a median income of $21,488 versus $13,958 for females. The per capita income for the city was $11,252. About 21.5% of families and 24.1% of the population were below the poverty line, including 29.3% of those under age 18 and 8.2% of those age 65 or over.

== Education ==
The community is served by Labette County USD 506 public school district.

== Notable people ==
- George Pepperdine, philanthropist, founder of Pepperdine University and Western Auto
- James Wesley, country music singer

== See also ==
- Big Hill Lake
