= Labette County, Kansas =

County in Kansas, United States

- County
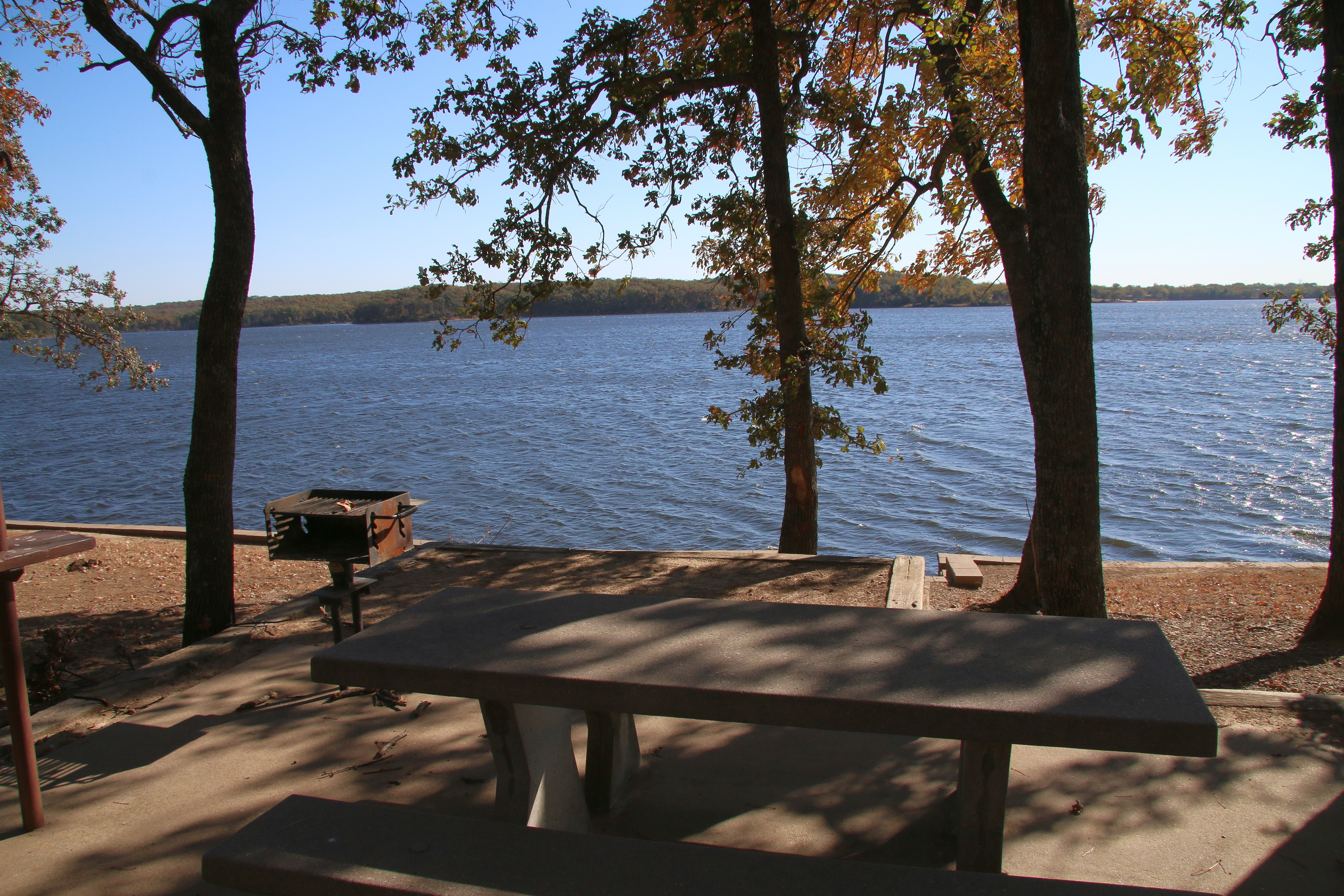
- Big Hill Lake (2015)

- Location within the U.S. state of Kansas
- Coordinates: 37°12′N 95°17′W
- Country: United States
- State: Kansas
- Founded: February 26, 1867
- Named for: Pierre La Bette
- Seat: Oswego
- Largest city: Parsons

Area
  - Total: 653 sq mi (1,690 km^{2})
  - Land: 645 sq mi (1,670 km^{2})
  - Water: 7.8 sq mi (20 km^{2}) 1.2%

Population (2020)
  - Total: 20,184
  - Estimate (2025): 19,685 ▼
  - Density: 30.5/sq mi (11.8/km^{2})
- Time zone: UTC−6 (Central)
  - Summer (DST): UTC−5 (CDT)
- Area code: 620
- Congressional district: 2nd
- Website: LabetteCounty.com

Labette County is a county located in Southeast Kansas. Its county seat is Oswego, and its most populous city is Parsons. As of the 2020 census, the county population was 20,184. The county was named after LaBette Creek, the second-largest creek in the county, which runs roughly north-northwest-south-southeast from near Parsons to Chetopa. The creek in turn was named after French-Canadian fur trapper Pierre LaBette, who had moved to the area, living along the Neosho River, and marrying into the Osage tribe in the 1830s and 1840s.

== History ==
In the 1840s Labette County had a population mainly consisting of Osage people, although there were also many Cherokee and Euro-Americans. Many of the Euro-Americans were merchants with Osage or Cherokee wives.

Between 1871 and 1873, at least eleven people vanished in the vicinity of an inn and general store operated by the Bender family in Labette County. Following the disappearance of the Benders in 1873, it was discovered that they had apparently murdered a number of travellers. Between eight and eleven bodies were discovered buried on the premises. Governor Thomas A. Osborn offered a reward of $2,000 for the apprehension of the Benders, but they were never found.

== Geography ==
According to the U.S. Census Bureau, the county has a total area of 653 square miles (1,690 km^{2}), of which 645 square miles (1,670 km^{2}) is land and 7.8 square miles (20 km^{2}) (1.2%) is water.

=== Adjacent counties ===
- Neosho County (north)
- Crawford County (northeast)
- Cherokee County (east)
- Craig County, Oklahoma (south)
- Nowata County, Oklahoma (southwest)
- Montgomery County (west)

== Demographics ==
Historical population
| Census | Pop. | Note | %± |
|---|---|---|---|
| 1870 | 9,973 | | — |
| 1880 | 22,735 | | 128.0% |
| 1890 | 27,586 | | 21.3% |
| 1900 | 27,387 | | −0.7% |
| 1910 | 31,423 | | 14.7% |
| 1920 | 34,047 | | 8.4% |
| 1930 | 31,346 | | −7.9% |
| 1940 | 30,352 | | −3.2% |
| 1950 | 29,285 | | −3.5% |
| 1960 | 26,805 | | −8.5% |
| 1970 | 25,775 | | −3.8% |
| 1980 | 25,682 | | −0.4% |
| 1990 | 23,693 | | −7.7% |
| 2000 | 22,169 | | −6.4% |
| 2010 | 21,607 | | −2.5% |
| 2020 | 20,184 | | −6.6% |
| 2025 (est.) | 19,685 | ▼ | −2.5% |
U.S. Decennial Census; 1790-1960 1900-1990; 1990-2000 2010-2020

The Parsons, KS Micropolitan Statistical Area includes all of Labette County.

=== 2020 census ===
As of the 2020 census, the county had a population of 20,184. The median age was 40.1 years. 25.2% of residents were under the age of 18 and 19.5% of residents were 65 years of age or older. For every 100 females there were 99.3 males, and for every 100 females age 18 and over there were 95.6 males age 18 and over. 46.7% of residents lived in urban areas, while 53.3% lived in rural areas.

The racial makeup of the county was 81.6% White, 4.3% Black or African American, 2.2% American Indian and Alaska Native, 0.5% Asian, 0.0% Native Hawaiian and Pacific Islander, 1.3% from some other race, and 10.1% from two or more races. Hispanic or Latino residents of any race comprised 4.7% of the population.

There were 8,222 households in the county, of which 28.9% had children under the age of 18 living with them and 27.1% had a female householder with no spouse or partner present. About 31.3% of all households were made up of individuals and 14.2% had someone living alone who was 65 years of age or older.

There were 9,524 housing units, of which 13.7% were vacant. Among occupied housing units, 69.1% were owner-occupied and 30.9% were renter-occupied. The homeowner vacancy rate was 1.8% and the rental vacancy rate was 14.0%.

=== 2010 census ===
As of the 2010 Census Labette County had a population of 21,607. The median age was 41. The racial and ethnic composition of the population was 85.5% non-Hispanic white, 4.7% African-American, 2.2% Native America, 0.4% Asian, 0.1% non-Hispanics of some other race, 3.6% non-Hispanics reporting two or more races and 4.0% Hispanic or Latino.

=== 2000 census ===
As of the 2000 census, there were 22,835 people, 9,194 households, and 6,114 families residing in the county. The population density was 35 inhabitants per square mile (14/km^{2}). There were 10,306 housing units at an average density of 16 per square mile (6.2/km^{2}). The racial makeup of the county was 89.28% White, 4.66% Black or African American, 1.95% Native American, 0.32% Asian, 0.01% Pacific Islander, 1.20% from other races, and 2.58% from two or more races. Hispanic or Latino of any race were 3.07% of the population.

There were 9,194 households, out of which 31.20% had children under the age of 18 living with them, 52.10% were married couples living together, 10.20% had a female householder with no husband present, and 33.50% were non-families. 29.80% of all households were made up of individuals, and 14.30% had someone living alone who was 65 years of age or older. The average household size was 2.39 and the average family size was 2.95.

In the county, the population was spread out, with 25.70% under the age of 18, 8.70% from 18 to 24, 25.80% from 25 to 44, 22.50% from 45 to 64, and 17.30% who were 65 years of age or older. The median age was 38 years. For every 100 females, there were 95.70 males. For every 100 females age 18 and over, there were 92.00 males.

The median income for a household in the county was $30,875, and the median income for a family was $37,519. Males had a median income of $29,043 versus $21,706 for females. The per capita income for the county was $15,525. About 8.90% of families and 12.70% of the population were below the poverty line, including 14.70% of those under age 18 and 11.90% of those age 65 or over.

== Government ==
=== Presidential elections ===
Similar to most rural Kansas counties, Labette County votes predominantly Republican. While Jimmy Carter and Bill Clinton won the county once each, it has shifted strongly away from the Democratic Party, with Hillary Clinton garnering the lowest percentage since 1928.

Presidential election results

United States presidential election results for Labette County, Kansas
| Year | Republican | | Democratic | | Third party(ies) | |
| Year | No. | % | No. | % | No. | % |
|---|---|---|---|---|---|---|
| 1888 | 2,870 | 47.38% | 976 | 16.11% | 2,211 | 36.50% |
| 1892 | 2,950 | 47.89% | 0 | 0.00% | 3,210 | 52.11% |
| 1896 | 3,206 | 46.20% | 3,669 | 52.88% | 64 | 0.92% |
| 1900 | 3,319 | 48.77% | 3,425 | 50.33% | 61 | 0.90% |
| 1904 | 3,700 | 58.68% | 1,637 | 25.96% | 968 | 15.35% |
| 1908 | 3,367 | 49.17% | 2,783 | 40.64% | 698 | 10.19% |
| 1912 | 1,516 | 21.85% | 2,568 | 37.02% | 2,853 | 41.13% |
| 1916 | 5,328 | 42.61% | 6,421 | 51.35% | 755 | 6.04% |
| 1920 | 6,596 | 57.94% | 4,328 | 38.02% | 460 | 4.04% |
| 1924 | 6,593 | 55.25% | 2,971 | 24.90% | 2,369 | 19.85% |
| 1928 | 9,048 | 74.22% | 2,969 | 24.35% | 174 | 1.43% |
| 1932 | 5,794 | 42.12% | 7,667 | 55.74% | 294 | 2.14% |
| 1936 | 6,610 | 44.91% | 8,050 | 54.69% | 59 | 0.40% |
| 1940 | 8,210 | 54.17% | 6,860 | 45.26% | 87 | 0.57% |
| 1944 | 7,480 | 57.87% | 5,398 | 41.76% | 48 | 0.37% |
| 1948 | 6,298 | 50.12% | 6,113 | 48.65% | 154 | 1.23% |
| 1952 | 8,624 | 61.99% | 5,219 | 37.51% | 70 | 0.50% |
| 1956 | 7,677 | 59.35% | 5,202 | 40.21% | 57 | 0.44% |
| 1960 | 7,491 | 58.49% | 5,248 | 40.98% | 68 | 0.53% |
| 1964 | 4,761 | 43.04% | 6,208 | 56.12% | 93 | 0.84% |
| 1968 | 5,503 | 51.19% | 3,974 | 36.97% | 1,273 | 11.84% |
| 1972 | 6,399 | 64.76% | 3,210 | 32.49% | 272 | 2.75% |
| 1976 | 4,640 | 45.59% | 5,294 | 52.02% | 243 | 2.39% |
| 1980 | 5,244 | 52.86% | 3,947 | 39.78% | 730 | 7.36% |
| 1984 | 6,542 | 63.76% | 3,631 | 35.39% | 87 | 0.85% |
| 1988 | 5,125 | 52.92% | 4,433 | 45.78% | 126 | 1.30% |
| 1992 | 3,368 | 33.09% | 4,196 | 41.23% | 2,613 | 25.68% |
| 1996 | 4,283 | 45.66% | 3,931 | 41.91% | 1,166 | 12.43% |
| 2000 | 4,475 | 52.41% | 3,745 | 43.86% | 318 | 3.72% |
| 2004 | 5,400 | 59.09% | 3,615 | 39.56% | 124 | 1.36% |
| 2008 | 5,001 | 55.38% | 3,839 | 42.51% | 191 | 2.11% |
| 2012 | 4,742 | 59.00% | 3,117 | 38.78% | 178 | 2.21% |
| 2016 | 5,335 | 65.81% | 2,291 | 28.26% | 481 | 5.93% |
| 2020 | 5,735 | 66.97% | 2,655 | 31.01% | 173 | 2.02% |
| 2024 | 5,410 | 68.30% | 2,385 | 30.11% | 126 | 1.59% |

=== Laws ===
Following amendment to the Kansas Constitution in 1986, the county remained a prohibition, or "dry", county until 1996, when voters approved the sale of alcoholic liquor by the individual drink with a 30% food sales requirement.

== Education ==
=== Colleges ===
- Labette Community College

=== Unified school districts ===
- Parsons USD 503
- Oswego USD 504
- Chetopa–St. Paul USD 505
- Labette County USD 506

District Office In Neighboring County

- Southeast USD 247

== Communities ==
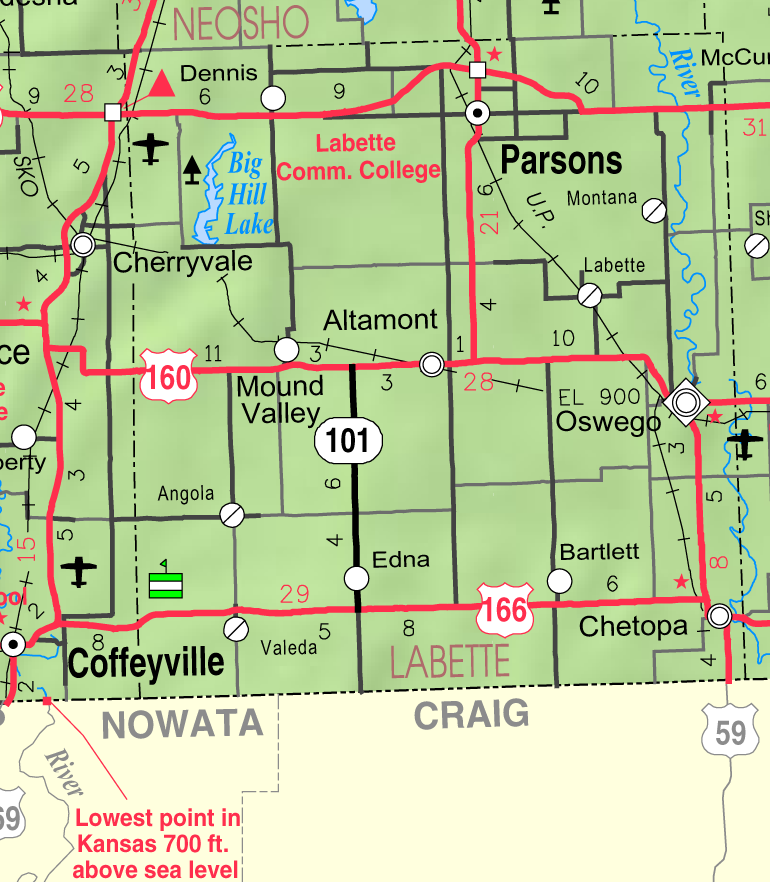
2005 map of Labette County (map legend)

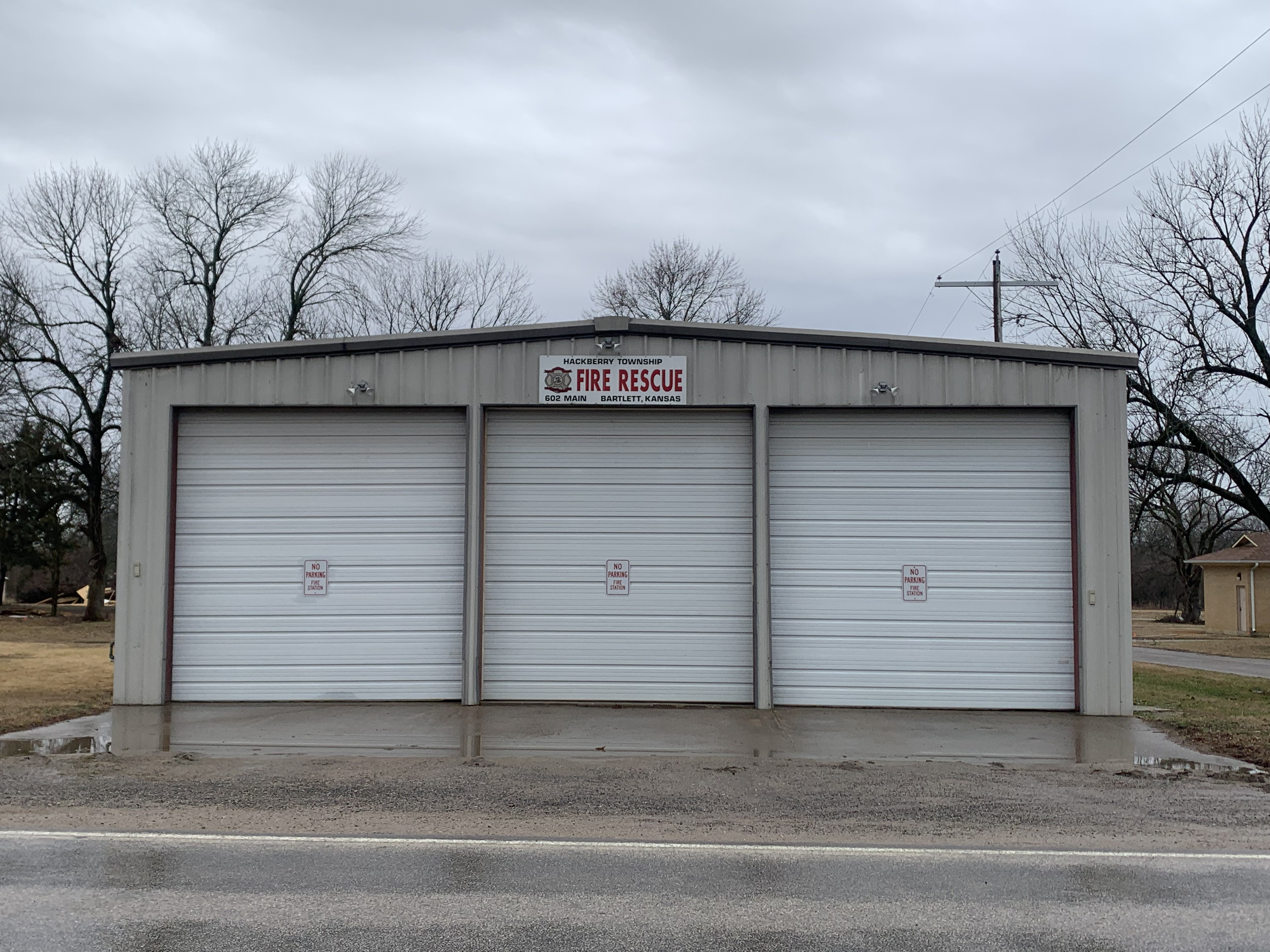
Hackberry Township Fire Rescue Building (2026)

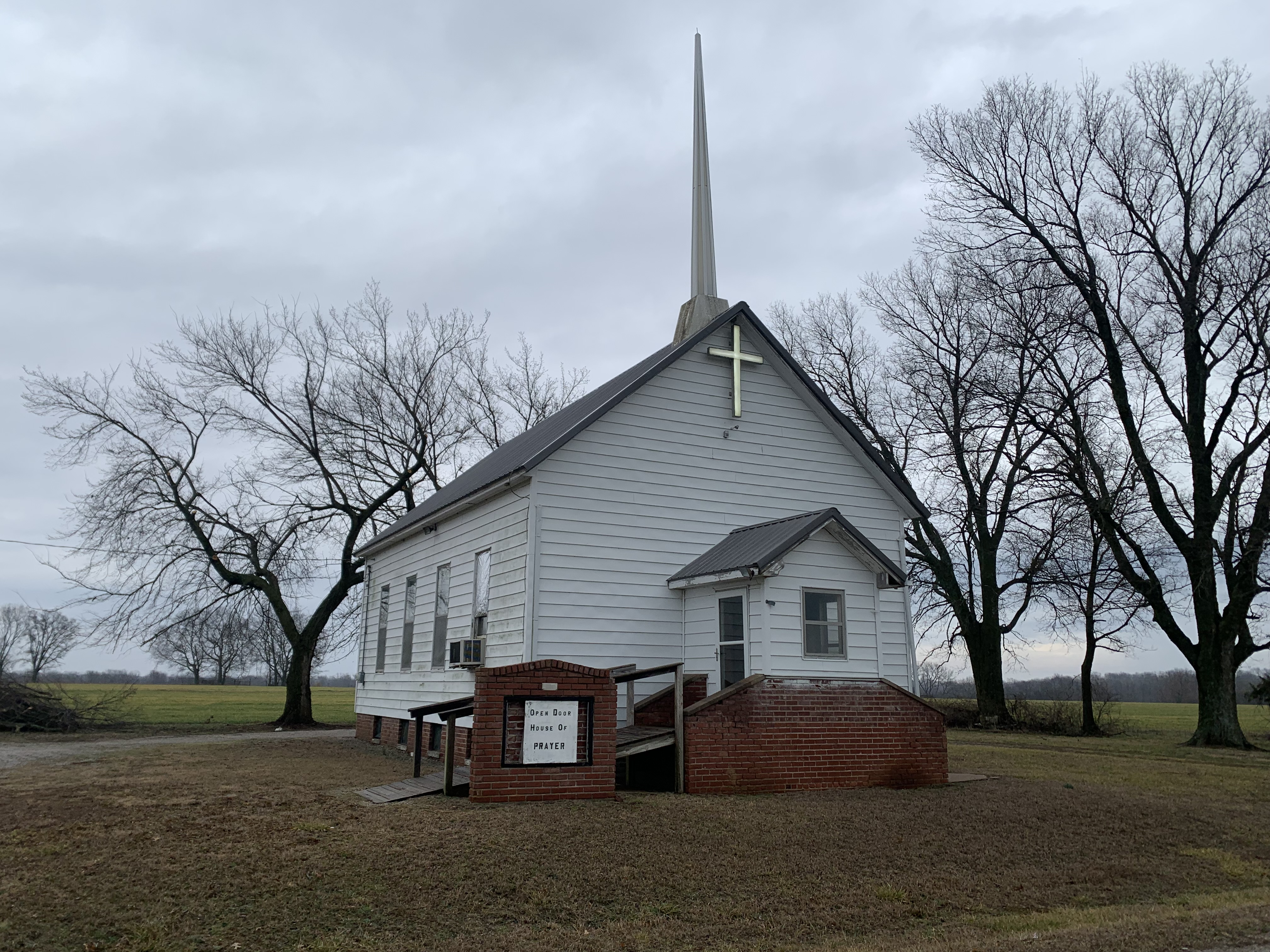
Zion Hill Church in Fairview Township (2026)

List of townships / incorporated cities / unincorporated communities / extinct former communities within Labette County.

=== Cities ===
- Altamont
- Bartlett
- Chetopa
- Edna
- Labette
- Mound Valley
- Oswego (county seat)
- Parsons

=== Unincorporated communities ===
† means a community is designated a Census-Designated Place (CDP) by the United States Census Bureau.

- Angola
- Dennis†
- Montana
- Valeda

=== Ghost towns ===
- Mortimer

=== Townships ===
Labette County is divided into sixteen townships. The cities of Chetopa, Oswego, and Parsons are considered governmentally independent and are excluded from the census figures for the townships. In the following table, the population center is the largest city (or cities) included in that township's population total, if it is of a significant size.

| Township | FIPS | Population center | Population | Population density /km^{2} (/sq mi) | Land area km^{2} (sq mi) | Water area km^{2} (sq mi) | Water % | Geographic coordinates |
|---|---|---|---|---|---|---|---|---|
| Canada | 10325 | | 217 | 2 (5) | 103 (40) | 0 (0) | 0.22% | 37°6′18″N 95°27′4″W |
| Elm Grove | 20750 | | 798 | 6 (16) | 130 (50) | 0 (0) | 0.17% | 37°3′22″N 95°20′12″W |
| Fairview | 22550 | | 239 | 3 (7) | 94 (36) | 0 (0) | 0.11% | 37°10′9″N 95°12′6″W |
| Hackberry | 29350 | | 403 | 3 (8) | 131 (51) | 0 (0) | 0.15% | 37°3′30″N 95°12′44″W |
| Howard | 33300 | | 357 | 3 (8) | 111 (43) | 0 (0) | 0.13% | 37°2′23″N 95°27′33″W |
| Labette | 37400 | | 373 | 4 (10) | 94 (36) | 0 (0) | 0.18% | 37°15′43″N 95°18′54″W |
| Liberty | 40175 | | 395 | 4 (11) | 95 (37) | 0 (0) | 0.11% | 37°15′47″N 95°11′45″W |
| Montana | 47850 | | 179 | 3 (7) | 71 (27) | 1 (1) | 1.90% | 37°15′28″N 95°7′34″W |
| Mound Valley | 48850 | | 806 | 5 (13) | 166 (64) | 0 (0) | 0.11% | 37°12′30″N 95°25′40″W |
| Mount Pleasant | 48950 | | 1,351 | 14 (37) | 93 (36) | 0 (0) | 0.34% | 37°10′50″N 95°18′14″W |
| Neosho | 49775 | | 222 | 3 (8) | 70 (27) | 2 (1) | 2.40% | 37°20′11″N 95°6′37″W |
| North | 50975 | | 612 | 7 (19) | 83 (32) | 0 (0) | 0.16% | 37°19′39″N 95°12′40″W |
| Osage | 53150 | | 703 | 4 (12) | 157 (61) | 5 (2) | 2.93% | 37°20′4″N 95°26′18″W |
| Oswego | 53475 | | 310 | 5 (12) | 66 (25) | 1 (0) | 1.73% | 37°9′21″N 95°6′22″W |
| Richland | 59425 | | 303 | 3 (8) | 97 (38) | 0 (0) | 0.43% | 37°3′29″N 95°6′19″W |
| Walton | 75250 | | 726 | 9 (23) | 83 (32) | 0 (0) | 0.16% | 37°20′59″N 95°19′2″W |
Sources: "Census 2000 U.S. Gazetteer Files". U.S. Census Bureau, Geography Division. Archived from the original on August 2, 2002.

== See also ==
- National Register of Historic Places listings in Labette County, Kansas

Community information for Kansas

- Kansas locations by per capita income
- List of counties in Kansas
- List of townships in Kansas
- List of cities in Kansas
- List of unincorporated communities in Kansas
- List of ghost towns in Kansas
