= Edna, Kansas =

City in Labette County, Kansas

- City
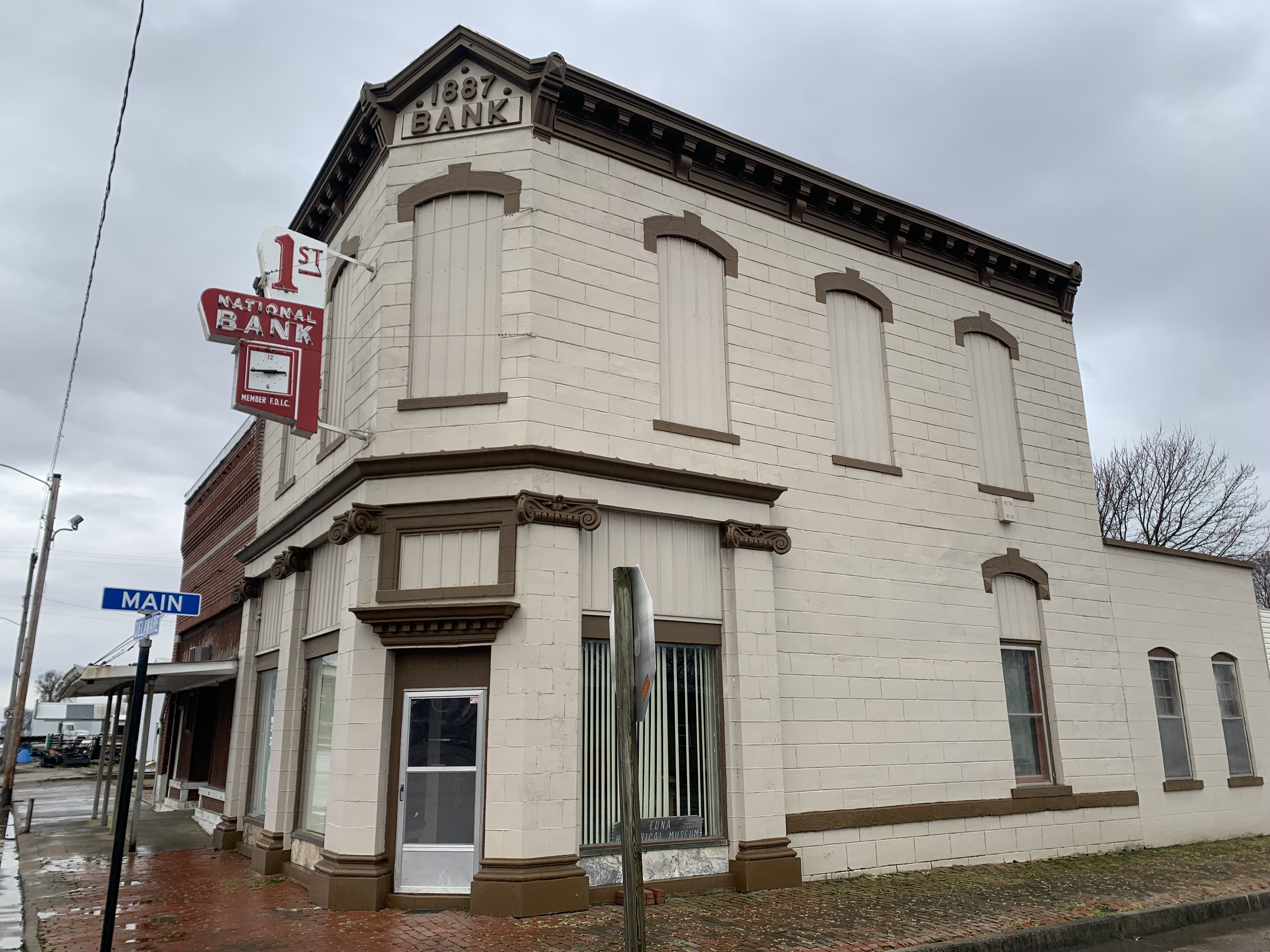
- Historic Bank building in Edna (2026)

- Location within Labette County and Kansas

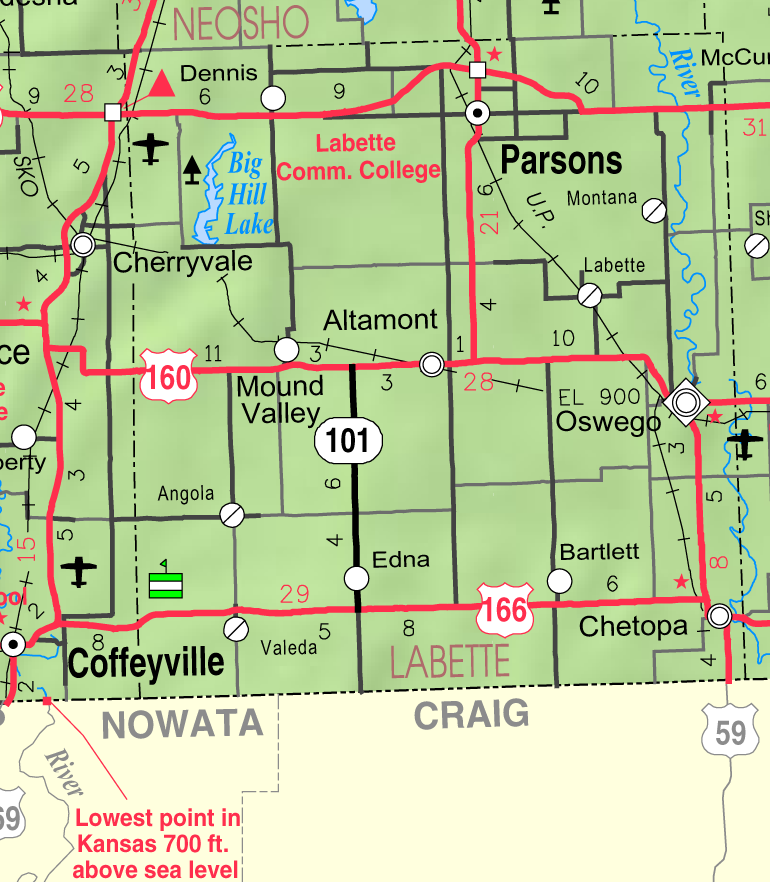
- KDOT map of Labette County (legend)
- Coordinates: 37°3′34″N 95°21′31″W
- Country: United States
- State: Kansas
- County: Labette
- Founded: 1870s
- Platted: 1886
- Incorporated: 1892
- Named for: Edna Gragory

Area
  - Total: 0.39 sq mi (1.02 km^{2})
  - Land: 0.39 sq mi (1.02 km^{2})
  - Water: 0 sq mi (0.00 km^{2})
- Elevation: 978 ft (298 m)

Population (2020)
  - Total: 388
  - Density: 985/sq mi (380/km^{2})
- Time zone: UTC-6 (CST)
  - Summer (DST): UTC-5 (CDT)
- ZIP Code: 67342
- Area code: 620
- FIPS code: 20-19900
- GNIS ID: 469311
- Website: cityofedna.org

Edna is a city in Labette County, Kansas, United States. As of the 2020 census, the population of the city was 388.

== History ==
The first store in Edna opened in 1876. The first post office in Edna was established in April 1878. The town of Edna was platted in the summer of 1886 when the railroad was extended to that point.

Edna was named in 1876 for a child, Edna Gragery.

The Edna Public Library opened in 1950.

== Geography ==
Edna is located at 37°3′34″N 95°21′31″W (37.059524, -95.358583). According to the United States Census Bureau, the city has a total area of 0.36 square miles (0.93 km^{2}), all land.

=== Climate ===
The climate in this area is characterized by hot, humid summers and generally mild to cool winters. According to the Köppen Climate Classification system, Edna has a humid subtropical climate, abbreviated "Cfa" on climate maps.

== Demographics ==
Historical population
Census	Pop.	Note	%±
1880	26		—
1890	321		1,134.6%
1900	374		16.5%
1910	489		30.7%
1920	500		2.2%
1930	502		0.4%
1940	507		1.0%
1950	422		−16.8%
1960	442		4.7%
1970	418		−5.4%
1980	537		28.5%
1990	438		−18.4%
2000	423		−3.4%
2010	442		4.5%
2020	388		−12.2%
U.S. Decennial Census

=== 2020 census ===
The 2020 United States census counted 388 people, 153 households, and 101 families in Edna. The population density was 984.8 per square mile (380.2/km^{2}). There were 199 housing units at an average density of 505.1 per square mile (195.0/km^{2}). The racial makeup was 82.22% (319) white or European American (81.96% non-Hispanic white), 0.52% (2) black or African-American, 5.67% (22) Native American or Alaska Native, 0.0% (0) Asian, 0.0% (0) Pacific Islander or Native Hawaiian, 0.0% (0) from other races, and 11.6% (45) from two or more races. Hispanic or Latino of any race was 1.29% (5) of the population.

Of the 153 households, 24.2% had children under the age of 18; 51.0% were married couples living together; 21.6% had a female householder with no spouse or partner present. 26.8% of households consisted of individuals and 14.4% had someone living alone who was 65 years of age or older. The average household size was 2.3 and the average family size was 2.8. The percent of those with a bachelor's degree or higher was estimated to be 15.2% of the population.

27.1% of the population was under the age of 18, 4.9% from 18 to 24, 21.9% from 25 to 44, 24.7% from 45 to 64, and 21.4% who were 65 years of age or older. The median age was 41.3 years. For every 100 females, there were 100.0 males. For every 100 females ages 18 and older, there were 108.1 males.

The 2016–2020 5-year American Community Survey estimates show that the median household income was $56,500 (with a margin of error of +/- $10,654) and the median family income was $68,750 (+/- $24,061). Males had a median income of $39,063 (+/- $14,764) versus $20,139 (+/- $3,830) for females. The median income for those above 16 years old was $31,111 (+/- $4,110). Approximately, 6.9% of families and 13.3% of the population were below the poverty line, including 19.8% of those under the age of 18 and 2.6% of those ages 65 or over.

=== 2010 census ===
As of the census of 2010, there were 442 people, 183 households, and 122 families residing in the city. The population density was 1,227.8 inhabitants per square mile (474.1/km^{2}). There were 219 housing units at an average density of 608.3 per square mile (234.9/km^{2}). The racial makeup of the city was 88.7% White, 3.4% Native American, 0.9% from other races, and 7.0% from two or more races. Hispanic or Latino of any race were 2.3% of the population.

There were 183 households, of which 33.3% had children under the age of 18 living with them, 53.6% were married couples living together, 10.9% had a female householder with no husband present, 2.2% had a male householder with no wife present, and 33.3% were non-families. 32.2% of all households were made up of individuals, and 18.1% had someone living alone who was 65 years of age or older. The average household size was 2.42 and the average family size was 3.04.

The median age in the city was 39.7 years. 25.3% of residents were under the age of 18; 10.2% were between the ages of 18 and 24; 19.8% were from 25 to 44; 27.3% were from 45 to 64; and 17.4% were 65 years of age or older. The gender makeup of the city was 49.1% male and 50.9% female.

== Education ==
The community is served by Labette County USD 506 public school district.

Edna High School was closed through school unification. The Edna High School mascot was Pirates.
