= Angola, Kansas =

Unincorporated community in Labette County, Kansas

- Unincorporated community
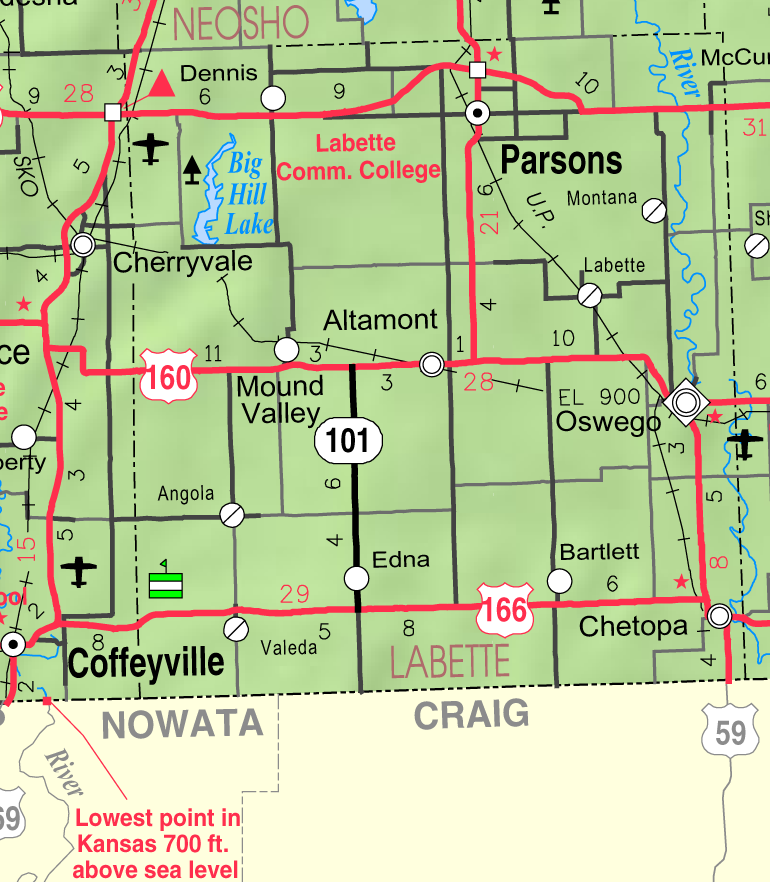
- KDOT map of Labette County (legend)

- Location within Kansas Location within the United States
- Coordinates: 37°6′20″N 95°26′58″W
- Country: United States
- State: Kansas
- County: Labette
- Founded: 1886
- Platted: 1886
- Elevation: 787 ft (240 m)
- Time zone: UTC-6 (CST)
  - Summer (DST): UTC-5 (CDT)
- Area code: 620
- FIPS code: 20-01850
- GNIS ID: 469166

Angola is an unincorporated community in Labette County, Kansas, United States.

== History ==
Angola was laid out in 1886. The post office was established on January 31, 1887, and discontinued on September 16, 1971. The community was served by the Missouri-Kansas-Texas Railroad for many years; however, flooding on the Verdigris River washed out the railroad bridge in the 1970s and rail traffic was thereafter re-routed, no longer passing through Angola.

== Education ==
The community is served by Labette County USD 506 public school district.
