= K-126 (Kansas highway) =

State highway in Kansas, U.S.

K-126
- K-126 highlighted in red

Route information
- Maintained by KDOT and the city of Pittsburg
- Length: 26.918 mi (43.320 km)
- Existed: September 30, 1943–present

Major junctions
- West end: US-400 south of McCune
- US-69 / US-160 in Pittsburg
- East end: Route 126 at the Missouri state line near Pittsburg

Location
- Country: United States
- State: Kansas
- Counties: Crawford

Highway system
- Kansas State Highway System; Interstate; US; State; Spurs
← K-124	→ K-127

K-126 is a 26.918-mile-long (43.320 km) mostly east–west state highway located entirely within Crawford County in southeastern Kansas. Its western terminus is at U.S. Route 400 (US-400) just south of McCune, and its eastern terminus is the Missouri state line where it continues as Route 126. Along the way the highway passes through the city of McCune and also the city of Pittsburg, where it intersects US-69 and US-160.

On October 11, 1940, the section from Pittsburg east to the Missouri state line was designated as K-104. On September 30, 1943, US-160 was realigned to follow K-126's current route from US-400 to Pittsburg, K-104 was moved to a highway from K-7 east to US-69, and the highway from Pittsburg east to the Missouri line was designated as K-126. Then in 1958, US-160 was realigned to go directly east from south of McCune to US-69 and at that time K-126 was extended along the old US-160 through McCune to end at the new US-160 (modern US-400).

== Route description ==
K-126 begins at an intersection with US-400 and heads northward; south of this intersection, the roadway continues as Northwest 100th Street. The highway passes the small city of McCune on its eastern limit, then meanders slightly to the northwest before turning north again. It continues in this direction for about two miles (3.2 km) and then curves due east. Afterward, K-126 crosses Lightning Creek and continues east through mostly open farmlands and pastures toward Pittsburg. Approximately five miles (8.0 km) east of Lightning Creek, the route intersects K-7, then crosses the BNSF Railway.

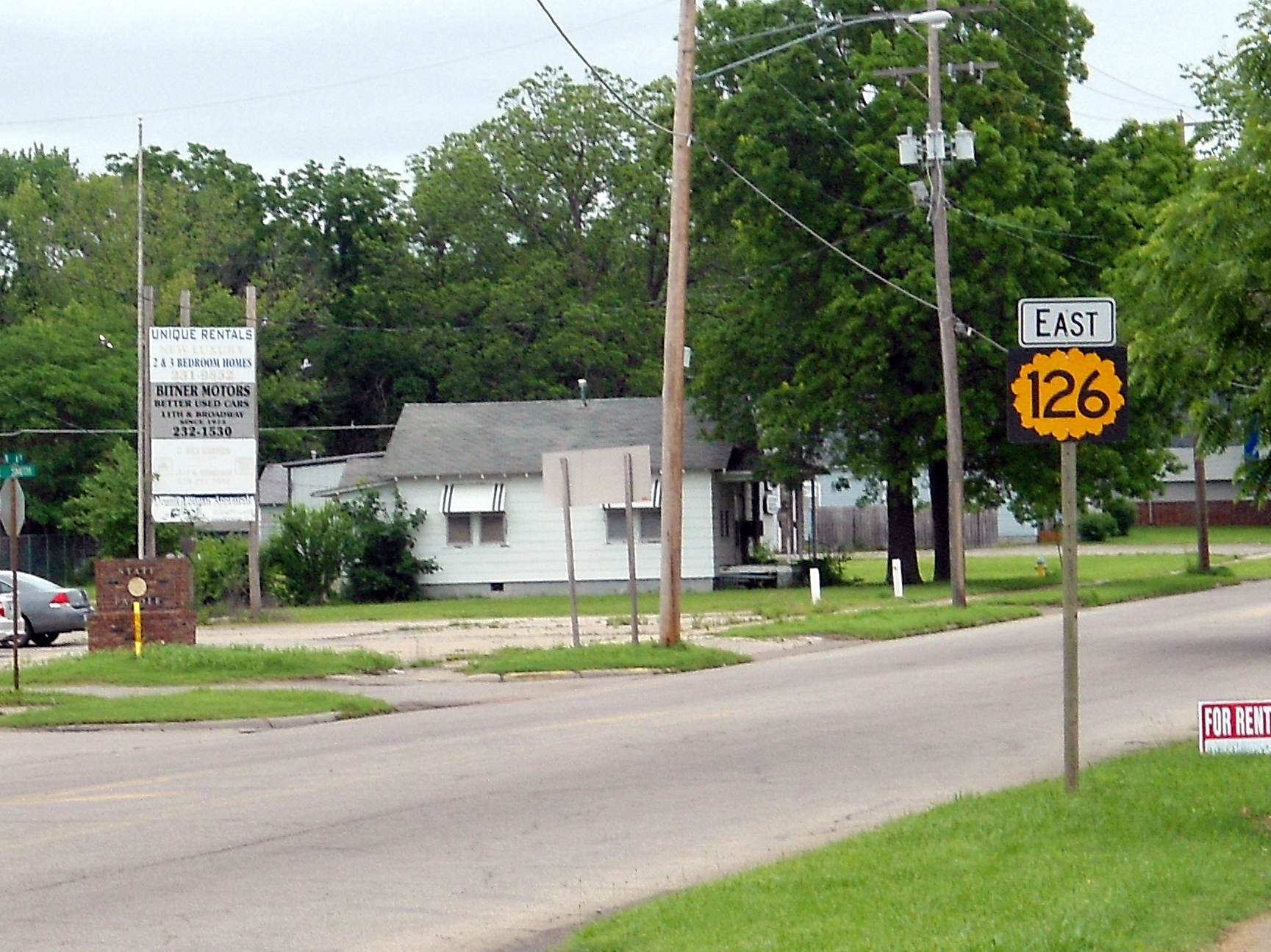
K-126 just east of the US-69/US-160 junction in Pittsburg

K-126 continues east past the railway through flat, open plains. It then enters a lightly wooded area scattered with several small ponds and crosses Second Cow Creek en route to Pittsburg. Just inside the city limits of Pittsburg, K-126 crosses First Cow Creek. East of the creek is a four-lane highway that carries the US-69 and US-160 designations. K-126 intersects this road, then continues eastward into the city; the route is known as 4th Street inside the city limits. It serves a residential area in the western section of the city, then passes a library and enters the downtown section. Here, it meets U.S. Route 69 Business (Broadway Street), then continues farther east.

After leaving the downtown section of Pittsburg, K-126 passes over a railroad that serves both the South Kansas and Oklahoma Railroad and the Kansas City Southern Railway. The road runs south of a city park, then heads through another residential neighborhood. After passing Pittsburg High School, K-126 exits Pittsburg and crosses East Cow Creek. East of the city, K-126 travels through a hilly, lightly wooded area for about three miles (4.8 km) before it bends to the southeast and terminates at the Missouri state line. The road continues eastward into Missouri as Missouri Route 126 toward Golden City.

The Kansas Department of Transportation (KDOT) tracks the traffic levels on its highways, and in 2017, they determined that on average the traffic varied from 645 vehicles per day slightly south of McCune to 5360 vehicles per day slightly east of the US-69 Business junction. The second highest was 5190 vehicles per day slightly west of the US-69/US-160 junction. K-126 is not included in the National Highway System. The National Highway System is a system of highways important to the nation's defense, economy, and mobility. K-126 does connect to the National Highway System at its junction with US-69 and US-160. All but 3.004 miles (5 km) of K-126's alignment is maintained by KDOT. The entire section within Pittsburg is maintained by the city.

== History ==
=== Early roads ===
Before state highways were numbered in Kansas there were Auto trails, which were an informal network of marked routes that existed in the United States and Canada in the early part of the 20th century. The former Jefferson Highway and Kansas City–Fort Scott–Miami–Tulsa Short Line crossed K-148 near the location of the K-7 intersection. The highway crosses the former Ozark Trails in Pittsburg.

=== Establishment and realignments ===
In an October 11, 1940 resolution, the section from Pittsburg east to the Missouri state line was designated as K-104. In a September 17, 1942 meeting, it was approved to realign US-160 from south of McCune directly east to US-69 and then north through Pittsburg along US-69 and to extend K-104 west from Pittsburg along the old US-160. But then in a September 30, 1943 resolution, that plan was cancelled due to restrictions imposed on the State Highway Commission caused by World War II. Also in that resolution US-160 was reinstated north through McCune then east to Pittsburg, K-103 was reinstated from McCune east to K-7 then south along K-7 then east through Weir to US-69, K-104 was established from K-7 along the Cherokee-Crawford county line to US-69 and K-104 from US-69 in Pittsburg east to the Missouri line was designated as K-126. In a December 15, 1953 resolution, K-126 was realigned near the Missouri state line to eliminate two sharp curves. In a November 23, 1955 resolution, was extended slightly west to meet a new alignment of US-69 and US-160. Then in 1958, US-160 was finally realigned east along K-103 from south of McCune to K-7 then continued east along K-104 to US-69 and at that time K-126 was extended along the old US-160 through McCune to end at the new US-160 south of McCune. In a December 1, 1994 resolution, K-126's western terminus was co-designated as US-400 when US-400 was created. This overlap lasted roughly four years then in a December 3, 1998 resolution, US-160 was realigned onto K-96 from Oswego eastward. Until 2003, K-57 originally overlapped US-69 through Pittsburg then in a May 14, 2003 resolution, K-57 was truncated to US-169 in Colony and the overlap was eliminated.

== Major intersections ==
The entire route is in Crawford County.

Location	mi	km	Destinations	Notes
Osage Township	0.000	0.000	US-400 – Pittsburg, Parsons	Western terminus
Sheridan Township	15.063	24.242	K-7 (150th Street) – Girard, Cherokee	
Pittsburg	21.060	33.893	US-160 / US-69 – Fort Scott, Columbus	
Pittsburg	22.103	35.571	US 69 Bus. (Broadway Street) – Fort Scott, Columbus	
Baker Township	26.918	43.320	Route 126 east	Continuation into Missouri
1.000 mi = 1.609 km; 1.000 km = 0.621 mi
