= K-3 (Kansas highway) =

State highway in Kansas, U.S.

K-3
- K-3 highlighted in red

Route information
- Maintained by KDOT
- Length: 43.262 mi (69.623 km)
- Existed: c. 1927–present

Major junctions
- South end: K-47 west of Girard
- US-54 north of Uniontown
- North end: K-31 west of Blue Mound

Location
- Country: United States
- State: Kansas
- Counties: Crawford, Bourbon, Linn

Highway system
- Kansas State Highway System; Interstate; US; State; Spurs
| ← K-2 | → K-4 |

K-3 is a 43.262-mile-long (69.623 km) state highway in southeastern Kansas that runs through Crawford, Bourbon and Linn counties from K-47 near Girard to K-31 near Blue Mound. It was designated around 1932, and the entire route was paved by 1958. The road is maintained by the Kansas Department of Transportation (KDOT), and is a two-lane road for its entire length. The route's concurrency with U.S. Route 54 (US-54) is a part of the National Highway System.

== Route description ==
K-3 begins at an intersection with K-47 west of Girard in Crawford County and heads north on a two-lane road through plains. Approximately three miles (4.8 km) north of its southern terminus, the route passes through the small community of Brazilton. North of here, the highway curves to the west, intersects the eastern terminus of K-146, and turns back to the north. K-3 crosses a branch of the Walnut Creek and continues north and cuts through Hepler. The route then enters Bourbon County. North of the county line, K-3 turns east and begins a concurrency with K-39. Shortly after, the highway leaves K-39 and turns to the north, continuing in that direction for about seven miles (11 km) before bending to the northwest. K-3 then curves to the north and crosses the Marmaton River.

Continuing north of the river, the highway twists to the northeast and passes through Uniontown. Just north of Uniontown, K-3 enters a concurrency with U.S. Route 54 (US-54) and turns west. The highways curve to the northwest, running through slightly wooded flat lands. K-3 leaves the concurrency with US-54 just east of the city of Bronson and turns north. About seven miles (11 km) north of the concurrency, K-3 serves as the eastern terminus of K-65. After this intersection, the highway crosses the Little Osage River, then enters Linn County. North of here, K-3 meets its northern terminus at an intersection with K-31 east of Blue Mound.

K-3 is maintained by KDOT. In 2012, the traffic on the route, measured in annual average daily traffic, was found to be between 130 and 2060 vehicles per day. Most of the traffic was present on the concurrency with US-54. K-3's concurrency with US-54 is included in the National Highway System, a system of highways important to the nation's economy, defense, and mobility.

== History ==
K-3 was designated in 1927. At that time, the route was almost completely gravel; only the concurrency with US-54 was paved. By 1950, the portion of K-3 in Crawford County had been paved. The portion of the route from the Crawford–Bourbon county line to the west end of the concurrency with K-39 was paved in 1953, and the remainder of the road was paved by 1958. No significant changes have been made to the route since then.

== Major intersections ==
| County | Location | mi | km | Destinations | Notes |
|---|---|---|---|---|---|
| Crawford | Grant Township | 0.000 | 0.000 | K-47 | Southern terminus |
| Crawford | Walnut Township | 6.406 | 10.309 | K-146 west | Eastern terminus of K-146 |
| Bourbon | Walnut Township | 14.477 | 23.298 | K-39 east | West end of K–39 concurrency |
| Bourbon | Walnut Township | 14.981 | 24.110 | K-39 east | East end of K–39 concurrency |
| Bourbon | Marion Township | 25.034 | 40.288 | US-54 east | East end of US–54 concurrency |
| Bourbon | Marion Township | 30.223 | 48.639 | US-54 west | West end of US–54 concurrency |
| Bourbon | Franklin Township | 37.232 | 59.919 | K-65 east | Western terminus of K–65 |
| Linn | Blue Mound Township | 43.262 | 69.623 | K-31 | Northern terminus |
1.000 mi = 1.609 km; 1.000 km = 0.621 mi: Concurrency terminus
