= K-146 (Kansas highway) =

State highway in Kansas, U.S.

K-146
- K-146 highlighted in red

Route information
- Maintained by KDOT
- Length: 15.564 mi (25.048 km)
- Existed: April 11, 1956–present

Major junctions
- West end: US-59 north of Erie
- East end: K-3 south of Hepler

Location
- Country: United States
- State: Kansas
- Counties: Neosho, Crawford

Highway system
- Kansas State Highway System; Interstate; US; State; Spurs
← K-145	→ K-147

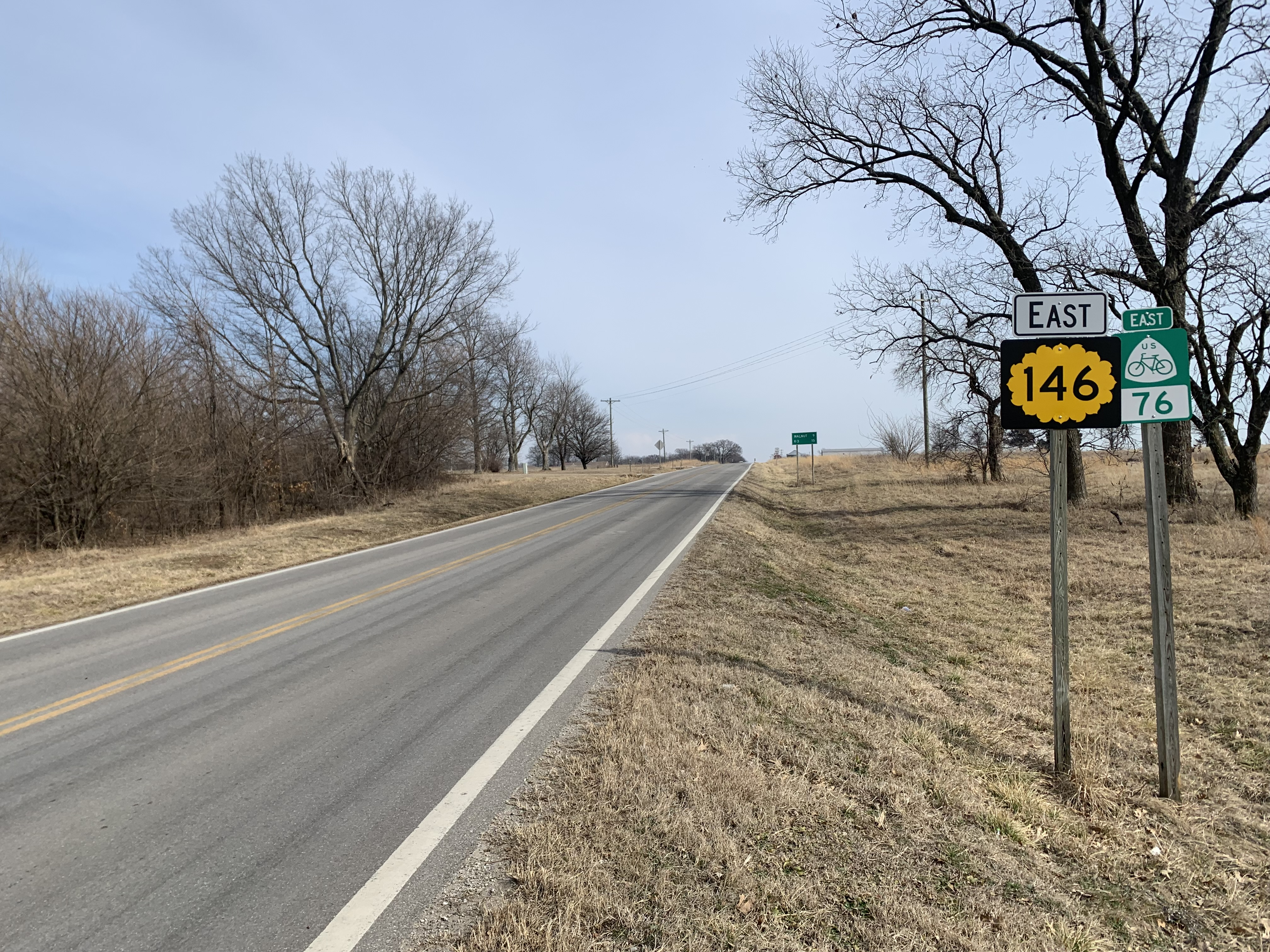
Kansas Highway 146 at junction with US 59, facing east

K-146 is a 15.564-mile-long (25.048 km) east–west state highway in eastern Kansas, United States. K-146's western terminus is at U.S. Route 59 (US-59) north of Erie in Neosho County. The eastern terminus is at K-3 northwest of Girard in Crawford County. The main purpose of the route is to serve the small city of Walnut. The highway is two-lanes for its entire length, and no part of it is included in the National Highway System.

On October 19, 1954, it was approved that once Neosho and Crawford counties had upgraded the roadway, that it would be added to the state highway system. At the meeting held on April 11, 1956, the highway had received the required upgrades, at which time it was added to that state highway system as K-146. The route has not been modified since its designation. The route is maintained by the Kansas Department of Transportation (KDOT).

== Route description ==
K-146's western terminus is at an intersection with US-59 (Pratt Road) just north of Erie in Neosho County. The highway proceeds east on a two-lane road to an at-grade crossing with a railroad owned by Union Pacific. The roadway continues to a crossing over Fourmile Creek before intersecting Udall Road, which travels south to St. Paul. K-146 continues east to a crossing over Flat Rock Creek, before entering Crawford County and the city of Walnut as Front Street. The highway crosses over Pony Creek and Little Walnut Creek before exiting the city. Continuing past Walnut, K-146 travels east to a crossing over Walnut Creek before reaching its eastern terminus at an intersection with K-3 south of Hepler and northwest of Girard.

K-146 is maintained by KDOT. KDOT tracks the traffic levels on its highways. On K-146 in 2020, they determined that on average the traffic varied from 510 vehicles per day slightly west to 560 vehicles per day slightly east Walnut. K-146 is not part of the National Highway System, a system of highways important to the nation's defense, economy, and mobility.

== History ==
In a meeting on October 19, 1954, it was approved that once Neosho and Crawford counties had upgraded the roadway to state highway standards, that it would be added to the state highway system. By the meeting held on April 11, 1956, the highway had received the required upgrades, at which time it was added to that state highway system as K-146. The highway first appears as a state highway on the 1957-58 state highway map but without a number. It was paved when it appeared on this map. K-146 first appears numbered on the 1960-61 edition of the state highway map. The route has not been modified since its designation.

== Major intersections ==
County	Location	mi	km	Destinations	Notes
Neosho	Erie Township	0.000	0.000	US-59 – Erie, Garnett	Western terminus
Crawford	Walnut Township	15.564	25.048	K-3 to K-47 – Hepler	Eastern terminus
1.000 mi = 1.609 km; 1.000 km = 0.621 mi
