= Walnut Grove Township, Kansas =

Township in Neosho County, Kansas, U.S.

Walnut Grove Township
- Township
- Location within Neosho County
- Coordinates: 37.594564°N 95.170047°W
- Country: United States
- State: Kansas
- County: Neosho

Area
  - Total: 48.256 sq mi (124.98 km^{2})
  - Land: 48.213 sq mi (124.87 km^{2})
  - Water: 0.043 sq mi (0.11 km^{2}) 0.09%

Population (2020)
  - Total: 327
  - Density: 6.78/sq mi (2.62/km^{2})
- Time zone: UTC-6 (CST)
  - Summer (DST): UTC-5 (CDT)
- Area code: 620

Walnut Grove Township is a township in Neosho County, Kansas, United States. As of the 2020 census, its population was 327.

== Geography ==
Walnut Grove Township covers an area of 48.256 square miles (124.98 square kilometers).

=== Communities ===
- part of Erie

=== Adjacent townships ===
- Grant Township, Neosho County (north)
- Walnut Township, Crawford County (east)
- Grant Township, Crawford County (southeast)
- Mission Township, Neosho County (south)
- Centerville Township, Neosho County (southwest)
- Erie Township, Neosho County (west)
- Big Creek Township, Neosho County (northwest)

=== Major highways ===
- K-146
