= Grant Township, Neosho County, Kansas =

Township in Neosho County, Kansas, U.S.

Grant Township
- Township
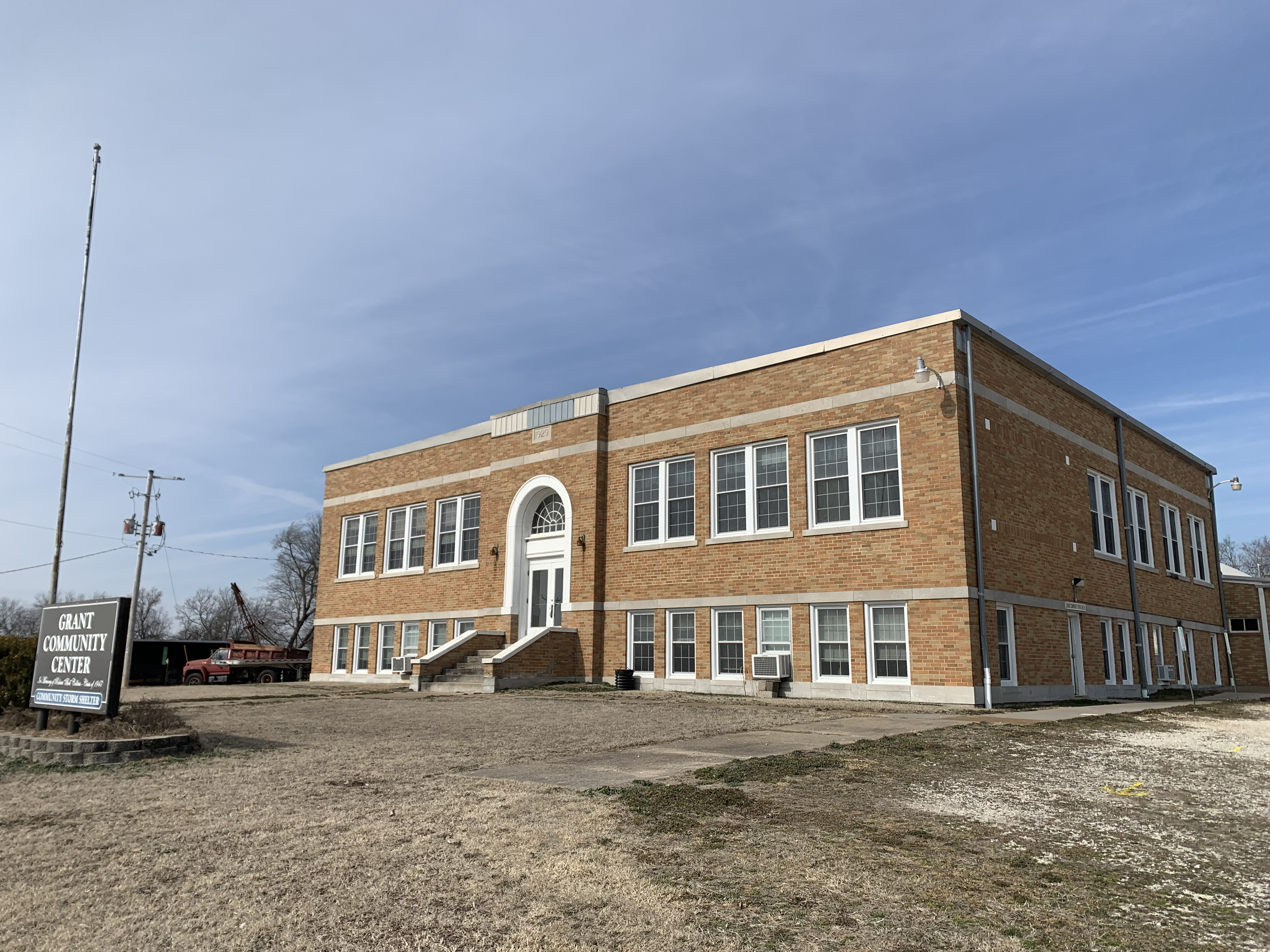
- Grant Community Center in Stark (2026)

- Location within Neosho County
- Coordinates: 37.6881°N 95.1533°W
- Country: United States
- State: Kansas
- County: Neosho

Area
  - Total: 48.173 sq mi (124.77 km^{2})
  - Land: 48.096 sq mi (124.57 km^{2})
  - Water: 0.077 sq mi (0.20 km^{2}) 0.16%

Population (2020)
  - Total: 352
  - Density: 7.32/sq mi (2.83/km^{2})
- Time zone: UTC-6 (CST)
  - Summer (DST): UTC-5 (CDT)
- Area code: 620

Grant Township is a township in Neosho County, Kansas, United States.

== History ==
Grant Township was organized in 1871.

== Geography ==
Grant Township covers an area of 48.173 square miles (124.77 square kilometers).

=== Communities ===
- Stark

=== Adjacent townships ===
- Elsmore Township, Allen County (north)
- Walnut Township, Bourbon County (northeast)
- Walnut Township, Crawford County (southeast)
- Walnut Grove Township, Neosho County (south)
- Erie Township, Neosho County (southwest)
- Big Creek Township, Neosho County (west)
- Cottage Grove Township, Allen County (northwest)

=== Major highways ===
- US-59
- K-39
