= Mission Township, Neosho County, Kansas =

Township in Neosho County, Kansas, U.S.

Mission Township
- Township
- Location within Neosho County
- Coordinates: 37.51°N 95.14°W
- Country: United States
- State: Kansas
- County: Neosho
- Established: 1871

Area
  - Total: 47.951 sq mi (124.19 km^{2})
  - Land: 46.005 sq mi (119.15 km^{2})
  - Water: 1.946 sq mi (5.04 km^{2}) 4.06%

Population (2020)
  - Total: 901
  - Density: 19.6/sq mi (7.56/km^{2})
- Time zone: UTC-6 (CST)
  - Summer (DST): UTC-5 (CDT)
- Area code: 620

Mission Township is a township in Neosho County, Kansas, United States.

== History ==
Mission Township was organized in 1871.

== Geography ==
Mission Township covers an area of 47.951 square miles (124.19 square kilometers). The Neosho River flows through it.

=== Communities ===
- St. Paul

=== Adjacent townships ===
- Walnut Grove Township, Neosho County (north)
- Walnut Township, Crawford County (northeast)
- Grant Township, Crawford County (east)
- Lincoln Township, Neosho County (south)
- Ladore Township, Neosho County (southwest)
- Centerville Township, Neosho County (west)
- Erie Township, Neosho County (northwest)

=== Major highways ===
- K-47
