= Lincoln Township, Neosho County, Kansas =

Township in Neosho County, Kansas, U.S.

Lincoln Township
- Township
- Location within Neosho County
- Coordinates: 37.4277°N 95.1300°W
- Country: United States
- State: Kansas
- County: Neosho
- Established: 1871

Area
  - Total: 48.084 sq mi (124.54 km^{2})
  - Land: 47.457 sq mi (122.91 km^{2})
  - Water: 0.627 sq mi (1.62 km^{2}) 1.30%

Population (2020)
  - Total: 254
  - Density: 5.35/sq mi (2.07/km^{2})
- Time zone: UTC-6 (CST)
  - Summer (DST): UTC-5 (CDT)
- Area code: 620

Lincoln Township is a township in Neosho County, Kansas, United States.

== History ==
Lincoln Township was organized in 1871.

== Geography ==
Lincoln Township covers an area of 48.084 square miles (124.54 square kilometers). The Neosho River flows through it.

=== Communities ===
- South Mound

=== Adjacent townships ===
- Mission Township, Neosho County (north)
- Grant Township, Crawford County (northeast)
- Osage Township, Crawford County (east)
- Neosho Township, Labette County (southeast)
- North Township, Labette County (southwest)
- Ladore Township, Neosho County (west)
- Centerville Township, Neosho County (northwest)
