= Herald Piper =

American football and basketball coach (1905–2018)

Biographical details
- Born: January 13, 1905; McCune, Kansas, U.S.
- Died: May 30, 1954 (aged 49); Los Angeles County, California, U.S.

Coaching career (HC unless noted)

Football
- 1923–1926: Chapman

Basketball
- 1922–1925: Chapman

Head coaching record
- Overall: 6–19 (football); 6–22 (basketball)

Herald Shively "Tiny" Piper (January 13, 1905 – May 30, 1954) was an American college football and college basketball coach. He served as the head football coach at Chapman University in Chapman, California from 1923 to 1926. He also served as the school's head men's basketball coach from 1922 to 1925.
