= Gross, Kansas =

Unincorporated community in Crawford County, Kansas, United States

- Unincorporated community
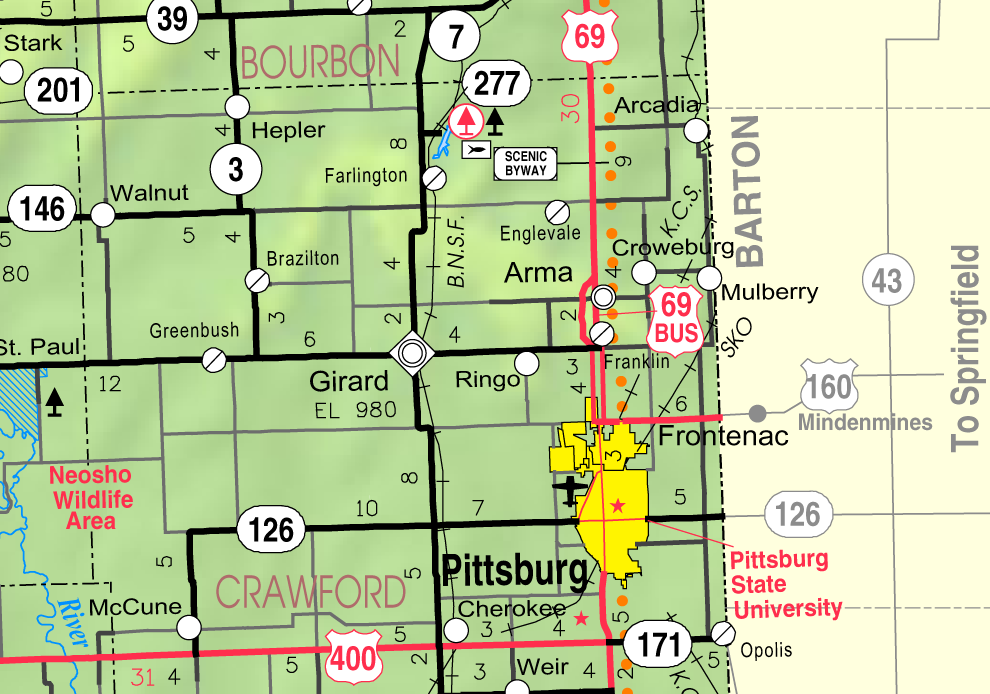
- KDOT map of Crawford County (legend)

- Location within Kansas Location within the United States
- Coordinates: 37°36′03″N 94°38′59″W
- Country: United States
- State: Kansas
- County: Crawford
- Elevation: 883 ft (269 m)
- Time zone: UTC-6 (CST)
  - Summer (DST): UTC-5 (CDT)
- Area code: 620
- FIPS code: 20-29000
- GNIS ID: 475156

Gross is an unincorporated community in Lincoln Township, Crawford County, Kansas, United States.

== History ==
Gross was a station and shipping point on the St. Louis & San Francisco Railroad.

The post office in the community was established on 28 September 1907 and discontinued on 30 April 1934.

Gross was the location of Crawford county school #135 and the A.B. Ryder Mercantile Company.
