= Big Creek Township, Neosho County, Kansas =

Township in Neosho County, Kansas, U.S.

Big Creek Township
- Township
- Location within Neosho County
- Coordinates: 37.693078°N 95.296717°W
- Country: United States
- State: Kansas
- County: Neosho

Area
  - Total: 48.082 sq mi (124.53 km^{2})
  - Land: 47.916 sq mi (124.10 km^{2})
  - Water: 0.166 sq mi (0.43 km^{2}) 0.35%

Population (2020)
  - Total: 496
  - Density: 10.4/sq mi (4.00/km^{2})
- Time zone: UTC-6 (CST)
  - Summer (DST): UTC-5 (CDT)
- Area code: 620

Big Creek Township is a township in Neosho County, Kansas, United States. As of the 2020 census, its population was 496.

== Geography ==
Big Creek Township covers an area of 48.082 square miles (124.53 square kilometers).

=== Communities ===
- Odense

=== Adjacent townships ===
- Cottage Grove Township, Allen County (north)
- Elsmore Township, Allen County (northeast)
- Grant Township, Neosho County (east)
- Walnut Grove Township, Neosho County (southeast)
- Erie Township, Neosho County (south)
- Canville Township, Neosho County (southwest)
- Tioga Township, Neosho County (west)

=== Major highways ===
- US-59
- K-39
