= Red onion (disambiguation) =

Red onion is a vegetable.

Red onion may also refer to:

- Red Onion, Kansas, a community in Kansas
- The Red Onion, a restaurant in Aspen, Colorado
- Red Onion State Prison, a state prison in western Virginia
- The Original Red Onion, a California Mexican restaurant
