= Englevale =

Englevale may refer to:

- Englevale, California, former name of Englewood, California
- Englevale, Kansas
- Englevale, North Dakota
