= Klondike, Kansas =

Unincorporated community in Crawford County, Kansas, United States

Coordinates: 37°22′04″N 94°45′35″W

Klondike is an unincorporated community in Crawford County, Kansas, United States.

== History ==
A coal mining camp called Klondike had its start in Crawford County during the 19th century.
