= Ringo, Kansas =

Unincorporated community in Crawford County, Kansas

- CDP
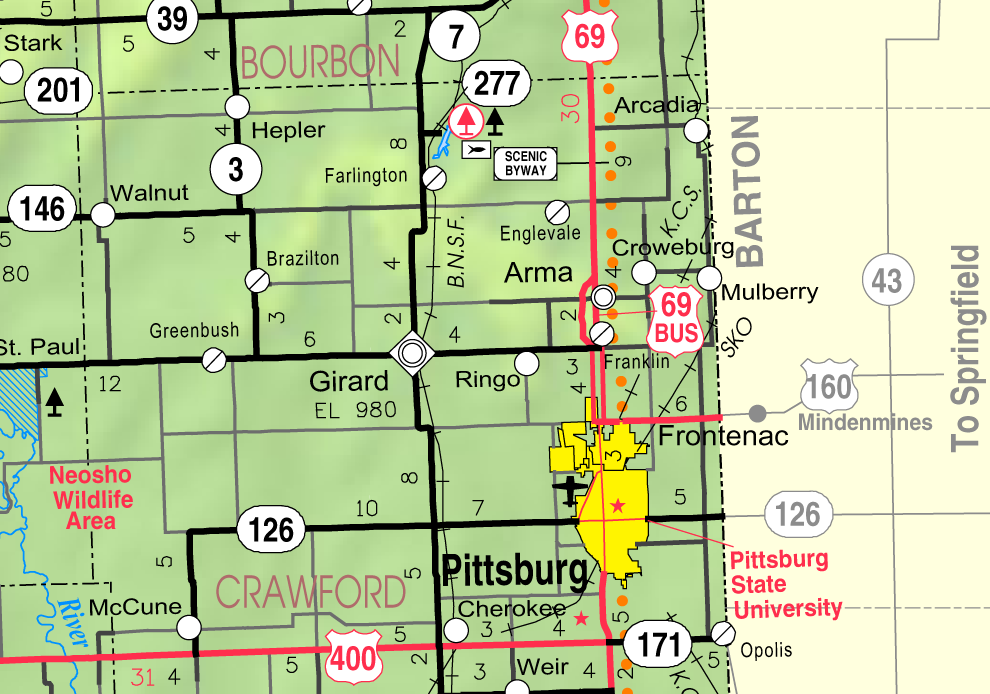
- KDOT map of Crawford County (legend)

- Location within Kansas Location within the United States
- Coordinates: 37°30′23″N 94°45′54″W
- Country: United States
- State: Kansas
- County: Crawford
- Elevation: 978 ft (298 m)

Population (2020)
  - Total: 111
- Time zone: UTC-6 (CST)
  - Summer (DST): UTC-5 (CDT)
- Area code: 620
- FIPS code: 20-59975
- GNIS ID: 2806554

Ringo is a census-designated place (CDP) in Crawford County, Kansas, United States. As of the 2020 census, the population was 111.

== History ==
A post office was opened in Ringo in 1915, and remained in operation until it was discontinued in 1957.

== Demographics ==
Historical population
Census	Pop.	Note	%±
2020	111		—
U.S. Decennial Census
