= Dry Wood, Kansas =

Unincorporated community in Crawford County, Kansas

Coordinates: 37°39′35″N 94°42′46″W

Dry Wood is an unincorporated community in Crawford County, Kansas, United States.

== History ==
A post office was opened in Dry Wood (also spelled Drywood) in 1894, and remained in operation until it was discontinued in 1915.
