= Monmouth, Kansas =

Unincorporated community in Crawford County, Kansas

- Unincorporated community
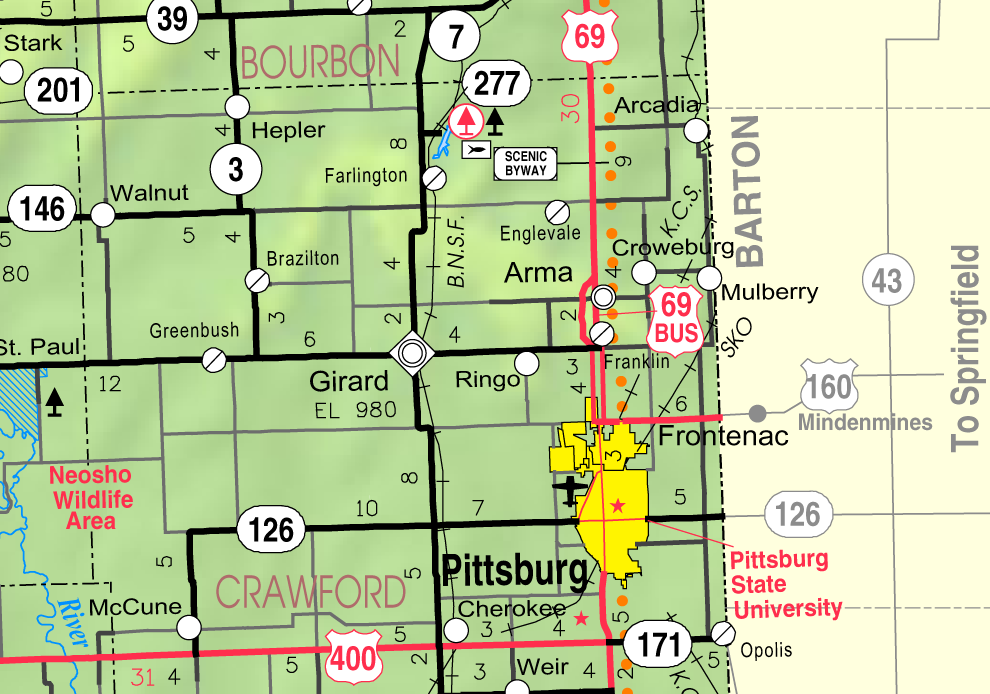
- KDOT map of Crawford County (legend)

- Location within Kansas Location within the United States
- Coordinates: 37°21′47″N 94°56′13″W
- Country: United States
- State: Kansas
- County: Crawford
- Founded: 1866
- Platted: 1866
- Named for: Monmouth, Illinois
- Elevation: 879 ft (268 m)
- Time zone: UTC-6 (CST)
  - Summer (DST): UTC-5 (CDT)
- Area code: 620
- FIPS code: 20-47675
- GNIS ID: 469622

Monmouth is an unincorporated community in Crawford County, Kansas, United States.

== History ==
Monmouth was laid out in 1866. It may be the oldest town in Crawford County. Monmouth was named after Monmouth, Illinois.

The first post office in Monmouth was established in July 1866.

Monmouth experienced growth in 1879 when a narrow-gauge railroad, the Memphis, Kansas & Colorado Railroad was first extended to that point. In 1882 the rail line was converted to standard gauge, and in 1901 the railroad came under the control of the St. Louis–San Francisco Railway which ran passenger and freight trains over the line during the earl half of the 20th century and maintained a depot at Monmouth. Passenger service ended in the late 1960s, and freight service continued into the 1980s, after Burlington Northern Railroad purchased the Frisco in 1980. The rail line was eventually abandoned in the early 1990s. The town experienced a boom in the 1920s, finding itself in the epicenter of extensive coal mining activity in Southeast Kansas. Today the town has less than ten residences. Its only remaining nonresidential structure is Monmouth Trinity Holiness Church.
