= Fuller, Kansas =

Unincorporated community in Crawford County, Kansas, United States

Coordinates: 37°31′20″N 94°37′11″W

Fuller is an unincorporated community in Crawford County, Kansas, United States.

== History ==
Fuller was a mining town on the Missouri Pacific Railroad.

A post office was opened in Fuller in 1894, and remained in operation until it was discontinued in 1914.
