= Capaldo, Kansas =

Unincorporated community in Crawford County, Kansas

Coordinates: 37°28′04″N 94°43′36″W

Capaldo was an unincorporated community in Crawford County, Kansas, United States. It is currently part of the city of Frontenac, and located northwest of the Frontenac Industrial Park #1.

== History ==
Capaldo had its start in the year 1912 as a coal mining camp. It was originally populated chiefly by Italian immigrants.

In the early 2000s, the community was annexed into the city of Frontenac.
