= Coalvale, Kansas =

Unincorporated community in Crawford County, Kansas

Coordinates: 37°36′56″N 94°38′56″W

Coalvale is an unincorporated community in Crawford County, Kansas, United States.

== History ==
A post office was opened in Coalvale in 1880, and remained in operation until it was discontinued in 1907. The Lewis Coal Company operated a coal mine at Coalvale in the 19th century.
