= Burgess, Missouri =

Unincorporated community in Missouri, U.S.

- Census-designated place
- Location of Burgess, Missouri
- Coordinates: 37°33′24″N 94°36′55″W
- Country: United States
- State: Missouri
- County: Barton

Area
  - Total: 0.11 sq mi (0.29 km^{2})
  - Land: 0.11 sq mi (0.29 km^{2})
  - Water: 0 sq mi (0.00 km^{2})
- Elevation: 889 ft (271 m)

Population (2020)
  - Total: 54
  - Density: 484.2/sq mi (186.94/km^{2})
- Time zone: UTC-6 (Central (CST))
  - Summer (DST): UTC-5 (CDT)
- FIPS code: 29-09802
- GNIS feature ID: 2787934

Burgess is a census-designated place and formerly incorporated village in Barton County, Missouri, United States. The population was 54 at the 2020 census.

== History ==
The village was named after a businessperson in the mining industry.

== Geography ==
According to the United States Census Bureau, the village has a total area of 0.07 square miles (0.18 km^{2}), all land. Burgess and Mulberry, Kansas form a contiguous settlement split by the state line.

== Demographics ==
Historical population
Census	Pop.	Note	%±
1910	249		—
1920	364		46.2%
1930	212		−41.8%
1940	164		−22.6%
1950	123		−25.0%
1960	86		−30.1%
1970	69		−19.8%
1980	98		42.0%
1990	97		−1.0%
2000	70		−27.8%
2010	57		−18.6%
2020	54		−5.3%
U.S. Decennial Census

=== 2010 census ===
As of the census of 2010, there were 57 people, 24 households, and 15 families living in the village. The population density was 814.3 inhabitants per square mile (314.4/km^{2}). There were 34 housing units at an average density of 485.7 units per square mile (187.5 units/km^{2}). The racial makeup of the village was 98.2% White and 1.8% from two or more races. Hispanic or Latino of any race were 5.3% of the population.

There were 24 households, of which 33.3% had children under the age of 18 living with them, 54.2% were married couples living together, 8.3% had a male householder with no wife present, and 37.5% were non-families. 33.3% of all households were made up of individuals, and 8.3% had someone living alone who was 65 years of age or older. The average household size was 2.38 and the average family size was 3.13.

The median age in the village was 31.8 years. 24.6% of residents were under the age of 18; 10.5% were between the ages of 18 and 24; 22.9% were from 25 to 44; 28.1% were from 45 to 64; and 14% were 65 years of age or older. The gender makeup of the village was 54.4% male and 45.6% female.

=== 2000 census ===
As of the census of 2000, there were 70 people, 25 households, and 18 families living in the town. The population density was 932.2 inhabitants per square mile (359.9/km^{2}). There were 33 housing units at an average density of 439.5 units per square mile (169.7 units/km^{2}). The racial makeup of the town was 98.57% White and 1.43% Native American.

There were 25 households, out of which 48.0% had children under the age of 18 living with them, 64.0% were married couples living together, 8.0% had a female householder with no husband present, and 28.0% were non-families. 20.0% of all households were made up of individuals, and 8.0% had someone living alone who was 65 years of age or older. The average household size was 2.80 and the average family size was 3.39.

In the town the population was spread out, with 28.6% under the age of 18, 10.0% from 18 to 24, 28.6% from 25 to 44, 20.0% from 45 to 64, and 12.9% who were 65 years of age or older. The median age was 36 years. For every 100 females, there were 118.8 males. For every 100 females age 18 and over, there were 108.3 males.

The median income for a household in the town was $19,375, and the median income for a family was $21,250. Males had a median income of $13,750 versus $8,750 for females. The per capita income for the town was $7,409. There were 20.0% of families and 17.4% of the population living below the poverty line, including 15.8% of under eighteens and none of those over 64.
