= Midway, Crawford County, Kansas =

Unincorporated community in Crawford County, Kansas, United States

Coordinates: 37.44922°N 94.63107°W

Midway is an unincorporated community in Crawford County, Kansas, United States.

== History ==
Midway had its start as a mining town, and was once a major railway shipping point of coal.

A post office was opened in Midway in February 1871, but it closed in March 1878. It re-opened in August 1886, at which time it was renamed Nyack. In May 1887, the old name Midway was restored. The post office closed permanently in 1912.
