= Curranville, Kansas =

Unincorporated community in Crawford County, Kansas

Coordinates: 37°30′49″N 94°37′54″W

Curranville is an unincorporated community in Crawford County, Kansas, United States.

== History ==
A post office was opened in Curranville in 1905, and remained in operation until it was discontinued in 1915.

Curranville was incorporated in 1906.
