= Lone Oak, Kansas =

Unincorporated community in Crawford County, Kansas, United States

Coordinates: 37°26′13″N 94°44′31″W

Lone Oak is an unincorporated community in Crawford County, Kansas, United States.

== History ==
A post office was opened in Lone Oak in 1884, and remained in operation until it was discontinued in 1886.

Lone Oak was known historically for its coal mining operations. In 1885, a mining accident in the shaft of the Lone Oak Coal Company killed two miners and injured four more.
