= Radley, Kansas =

Unincorporated community in Crawford County, Kansas

- CDP
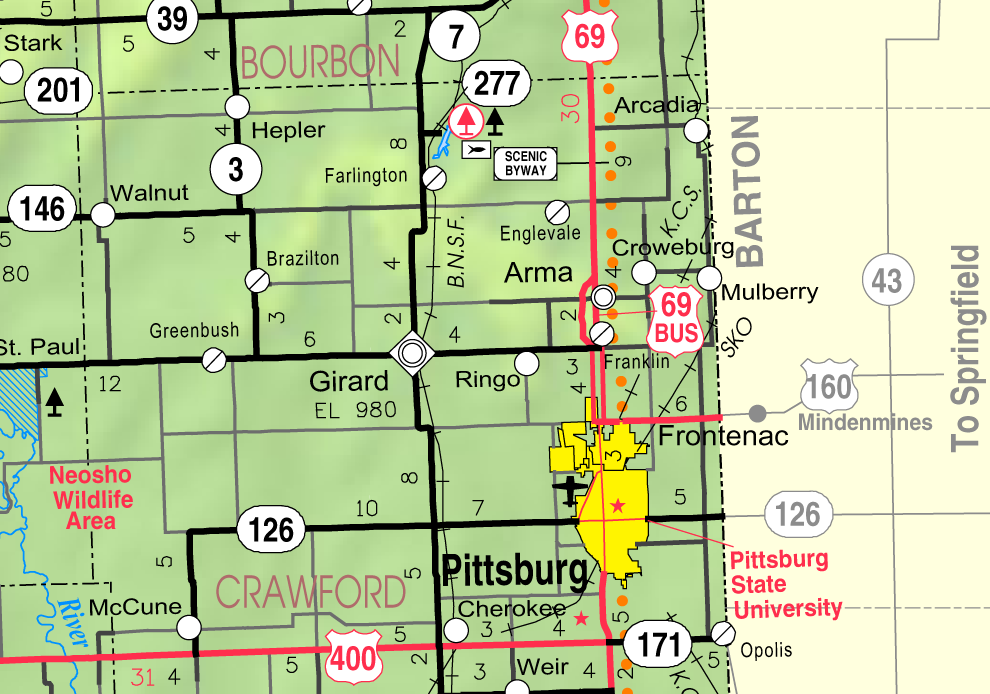
- KDOT map of Crawford County (legend)

- Location within Kansas Location within the United States
- Coordinates: 37°29′05″N 94°45′37″W
- Country: United States
- State: Kansas
- County: Crawford
- Elevation: 978 ft (298 m)

Population (2020)
  - Total: 105
- Time zone: UTC-6 (CST)
  - Summer (DST): UTC-5 (CDT)
- Area code: 620
- FIPS code: 20-58325
- GNIS ID: 2806547

Radley is a census-designated place (CDP) in Crawford County, Kansas, United States. As of the 2020 census, the population was 105.

== History ==
A post office was opened in Radley in 1913, and remained in operation until it was discontinued in 1988.

== Demographics ==
Historical population
Census	Pop.	Note	%±
2020	105		—
U.S. Decennial Census

The 2020 United States census counted 105 people, 45 households, and 31 families in Radley. The population density was 139.3 per square mile (53.8/km^{2}). There were 45 housing units at an average density of 59.7 per square mile (23.0/km^{2}). The racial makeup was 97.14% (102) white or European American (93.33% non-Hispanic white), 0.0% (0) black or African-American, 0.0% (0) Native American or Alaska Native, 0.0% (0) Asian, 0.0% (0) Pacific Islander or Native Hawaiian, 0.95% (1) from other races, and 1.9% (2) from two or more races. Hispanic or Latino of any race was 4.76% (5) of the population.

Of the 45 households, 37.8% had children under the age of 18; 57.8% were married couples living together; 31.1% had a female householder with no spouse or partner present. 24.4% of households consisted of individuals and 4.4% had someone living alone who was 65 years of age or older. The average household size was 2.0 and the average family size was 2.0. The percent of those with a bachelor's degree or higher was estimated to be 22.9% of the population.

23.8% of the population was under the age of 18, 4.8% from 18 to 24, 22.9% from 25 to 44, 30.5% from 45 to 64, and 18.1% who were 65 years of age or older. The median age was 43.3 years. For every 100 females, there were 110.0 males. For every 100 females ages 18 and older, there were 110.5 males.

The 2016–2020 5-year American Community Survey estimates show that the median household income was $48,250 (with a margin of error of +/- $16,628) and the median family income was $48,250 (+/- $16,628).
