= Polk, Kansas =

Unincorporated community in Crawford County, Kansas

- Unincorporated community
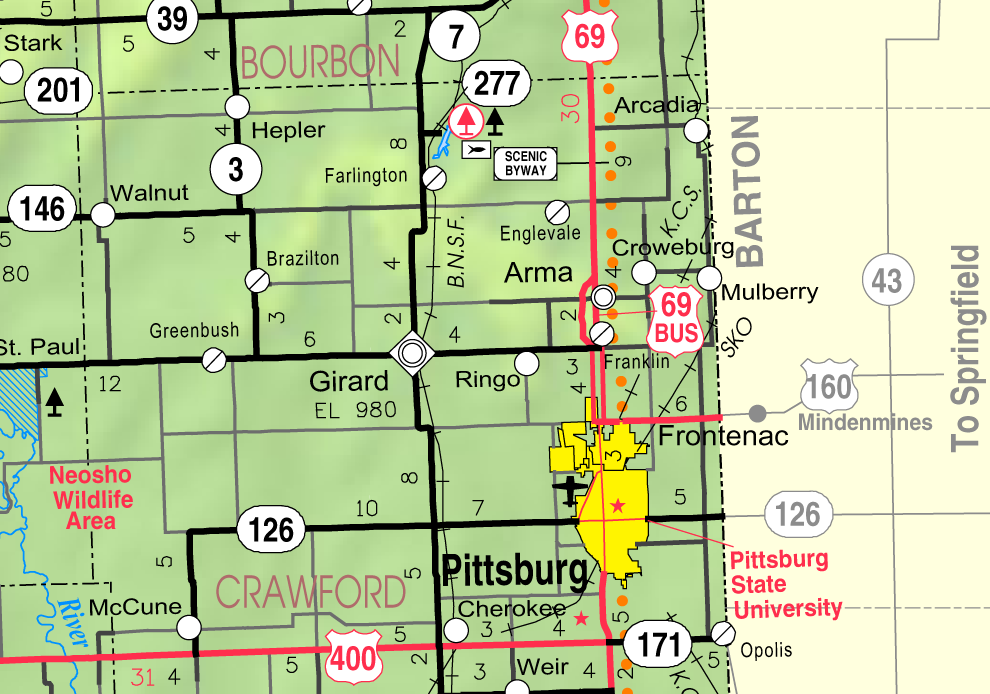
- KDOT map of Crawford County (legend)

- Location within Kansas Location within the United States
- Coordinates: 37°32′36″N 94°44′31″W
- Country: United States
- State: Kansas
- County: Crawford
- Elevation: 1,001 ft (305 m)
- Time zone: UTC-6 (CST)
  - Summer (DST): UTC-5 (CDT)
- FIPS code: 20-56950
- GNIS ID: 480392

Polk is an unincorporated community in Crawford County, Kansas, United States. It is located west of Arma at the intersection of E 640th Ave and N 200th St.

== Education ==
The community is served by Northeast USD 246 public school district.
