= Chicopee, Kansas =

Unincorporated community in Crawford County, Kansas

- CDP
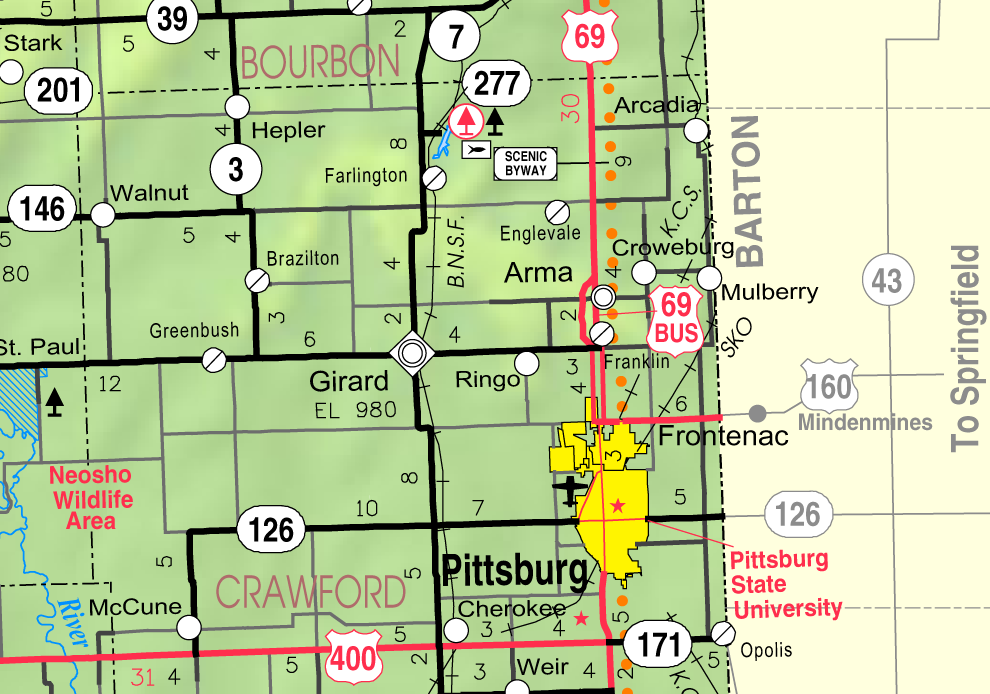
- KDOT map of Crawford County (legend)

- Location within Kansas Location within the United States
- Coordinates: 37°26′25″N 94°49′42″W
- Country: United States
- State: Kansas
- County: Crawford

Area
  - Total: 3.2 sq mi (8.3 km^{2})
  - Land: 3.2 sq mi (8.2 km^{2})
  - Water: 0.039 sq mi (0.1 km^{2})
- Elevation: 919 ft (280 m)

Population (2020)
  - Total: 422
  - Density: 130/sq mi (51/km^{2})
- Time zone: UTC-6 (CST)
  - Summer (DST): UTC-5 (CDT)
- Area code: 620
- FIPS code: 20-13100
- GNIS ID: 2630052

Chicopee is a census-designated place (CDP) in Crawford County, Kansas, United States. As of the 2020 census, the population was 422.

== History ==
Chicopee was a coal mining community.

The post office opened June 10, 1889, closed September 30, 1892, reopened October 8, 1892, and reclosed March 30, 1918.

Chicopee was the home of the defunct Idlehour amusement park.

== Geography ==
Chicopee lies at the intersection of the county roads known as South 200th Street & East 530th Avenue, 4 miles (6 km) by road southwest of downtown Pittsburg. The northwestern corner of the town borders on the grounds of the Crestwood Country Club. The Crestwood golf course opened in 1958.

== Demographics ==
Historical population
Census	Pop.	Note	%±
2010	408		—
2020	422		3.4%
U.S. Decennial Census

The 2020 United States census counted 422 people, 176 households, and 129 families in Chicopee. The population density was 133.4 per square mile (51.5/km^{2}). There were 190 housing units at an average density of 60.1 per square mile (23.2/km^{2}). The racial makeup was 93.13% (393) white or European American (92.65% non-Hispanic white), 0.0% (0) black or African-American, 0.0% (0) Native American or Alaska Native, 0.71% (3) Asian, 0.0% (0) Pacific Islander or Native Hawaiian, 0.71% (3) from other races, and 5.45% (23) from two or more races. Hispanic or Latino of any race was 1.66% (7) of the population.

Of the 176 households, 29.5% had children under the age of 18; 65.9% were married couples living together; 11.4% had a female householder with no spouse or partner present. 19.3% of households consisted of individuals and 6.2% had someone living alone who was 65 years of age or older. The average household size was 2.1 and the average family size was 2.5. The percent of those with a bachelor's degree or higher was estimated to be 51.9% of the population.

24.6% of the population was under the age of 18, 5.5% from 18 to 24, 18.2% from 25 to 44, 30.1% from 45 to 64, and 21.6% who were 65 years of age or older. The median age was 46.8 years. For every 100 females, there were 79.6 males. For every 100 females ages 18 and older, there were 91.6 males.

The median income for those above 16 years old was $32,262 (+/- $17,927). Approximately, 9.1% of families and 12.9% of the population were below the poverty line, including 27.7% of those under the age of 18 and 0.0% of those ages 65 or over.
