= Mulberry, Kansas =

City in Crawford County, Kansas

- City
- Location within Crawford County and Kansas

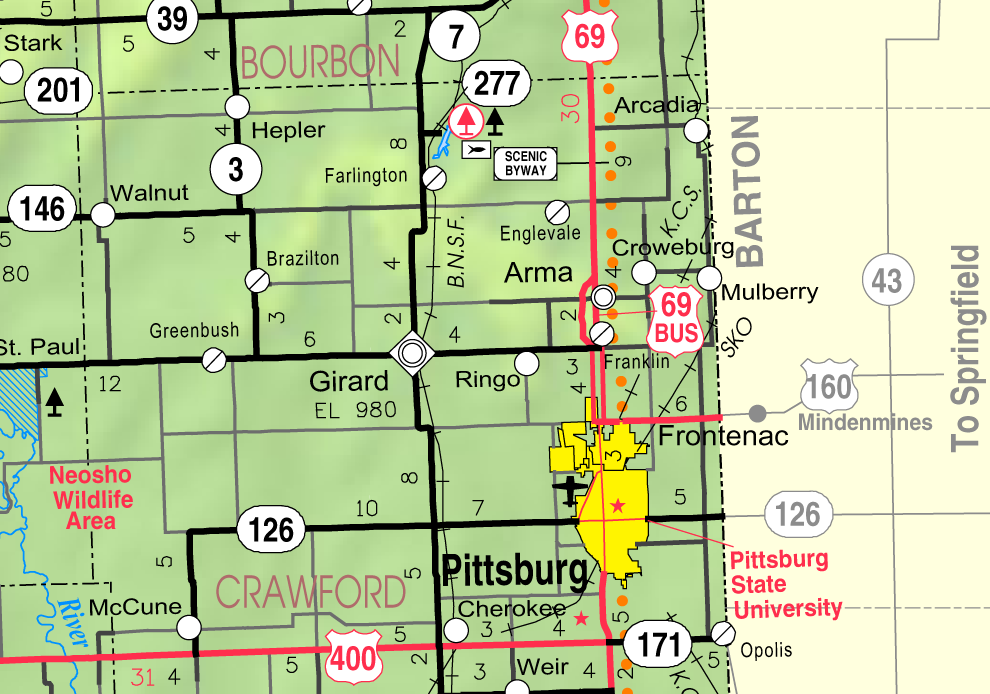
- KDOT map of Crawford County (legend)
- Coordinates: 37°33′21″N 94°37′24″W
- Country: United States
- State: Kansas
- County: Crawford
- Founded: 1875
- Incorporated: 1902
- Named for: Mulberry tree

Area
  - Total: 0.47 sq mi (1.22 km^{2})
  - Land: 0.47 sq mi (1.22 km^{2})
  - Water: 0 sq mi (0.00 km^{2})
- Elevation: 929 ft (283 m)

Population (2020)
  - Total: 409
  - Density: 868/sq mi (335/km^{2})
- Time zone: UTC-6 (CST)
  - Summer (DST): UTC-5 (CDT)
- ZIP Code: 66756
- Area code: 620
- FIPS code: 20-49025
- GNIS ID: 485626
- Website: cityofmulberryks.com

Mulberry is a city in Crawford County, Kansas, United States. As of the 2020 census, the population of the city was 409.

== History ==
Mulberry was founded about 1875 as a mining town. Mulberry was named from a grove of wild mulberry trees that stood on a former Indian camping and hunting site, where the town was laid out.

The first post office at Mulberry (called Mulberry Grove until 1892) was established in 1869.

== Geography ==
According to the United States Census Bureau, the city has a total area of 0.50 square miles (1.29 km^{2}), all land. It directly abuts the Kansas-Missouri state line and is contiguous with the village of Burgess, Missouri.

== Demographics ==
Historical population
Census	Pop.	Note	%±
1910	997		—
1920	2,697		170.5%
1930	1,596		−40.8%
1940	1,175		−26.4%
1950	779		−33.7%
1960	642		−17.6%
1970	622		−3.1%
1980	647		4.0%
1990	555		−14.2%
2000	577		4.0%
2010	520		−9.9%
2020	409		−21.3%
U.S. Decennial Census

=== 2020 census ===
The 2020 United States census counted 409 people, 175 households, and 115 families in Mulberry. The population density was 868.4 per square mile (335.3/km^{2}). There were 227 housing units at an average density of 482.0 per square mile (186.1/km^{2}). The racial makeup was 88.51% (362) white or European American (87.29% non-Hispanic white), 0.49% (2) black or African-American, 1.47% (6) Native American or Alaska Native, 0.0% (0) Asian, 0.0% (0) Pacific Islander or Native Hawaiian, 1.47% (6) from other races, and 8.07% (33) from two or more races. Hispanic or Latino of any race was 3.67% (15) of the population.

Of the 175 households, 24.0% had children under the age of 18; 42.9% were married couples living together; 28.0% had a female householder with no spouse or partner present. 31.4% of households consisted of individuals and 13.7% had someone living alone who was 65 years of age or older. The average household size was 2.1 and the average family size was 2.3. The percent of those with a bachelor's degree or higher was estimated to be 9.0% of the population.

23.5% of the population was under the age of 18, 6.6% from 18 to 24, 24.2% from 25 to 44, 28.1% from 45 to 64, and 17.6% who were 65 years of age or older. The median age was 41.9 years. For every 100 females, there were 104.5 males. For every 100 females ages 18 and older, there were 100.6 males.

The 2016–2020 5-year American Community Survey estimates show that the median household income was $42,793 (with a margin of error of +/- $11,571) and the median family income was $44,176 (+/- $13,154). Males had a median income of $27,143 (+/- $10,413) versus $12,500 (+/- $8,598) for females. The median income for those above 16 years old was $20,000 (+/- $15,795). Approximately, 16.3% of families and 24.2% of the population were below the poverty line, including 52.8% of those under the age of 18 and 13.2% of those ages 65 or over.

=== 2010 census ===
As of the census of 2010, there were 520 people, 220 households, and 140 families living in the city. The population density was 1,040.0 inhabitants per square mile (401.5/km^{2}). There were 271 housing units at an average density of 542.0 per square mile (209.3/km^{2}). The racial makeup of the city was 89.8% White, 0.6% African American, 3.7% Native American, 2.5% from other races, and 3.5% from two or more races. Hispanic or Latino of any race were 3.5% of the population.

There were 220 households, of which 28.2% had children under the age of 18 living with them, 46.8% were married couples living together, 10.9% had a female householder with no husband present, 5.9% had a male householder with no wife present, and 36.4% were non-families. 31.4% of all households were made up of individuals, and 10% had someone living alone who was 65 years of age or older. The average household size was 2.36 and the average family size was 2.90.

The median age in the city was 41.8 years. 22.5% of residents were under the age of 18; 7.1% were between the ages of 18 and 24; 24.2% were from 25 to 44; 30.3% were from 45 to 64; and 15.8% were 65 years of age or older. The gender makeup of the city was 49.6% male and 50.4% female.

=== 2000 census ===
As of the census of 2000, there were 577 people, 249 households, and 164 families living in the city. The population density was 1,137.8 inhabitants per square mile (439.3/km^{2}). There were 287 housing units at an average density of 565.9 per square mile (218.5/km^{2}). The racial makeup of the city was 95.67% White, 3.29% Native American, 0.17% from other races, and 0.87% from two or more races. Hispanic or Latino of any race were 1.39% of the population.

There were 249 households, out of which 27.7% had children under the age of 18 living with them, 53.4% were married couples living together, 8.0% had a female householder with no husband present, and 34.1% were non-families. 30.1% of all households were made up of individuals, and 17.7% had someone living alone who was 65 years of age or older. The average household size was 2.32 and the average family size was 2.83.

In the city, the population was spread out, with 23.9% under the age of 18, 8.3% from 18 to 24, 25.5% from 25 to 44, 25.3% from 45 to 64, and 17.0% who were 65 years of age or older. The median age was 40 years. For every 100 females, there were 91.7 males. For every 100 females age 18 and over, there were 91.7 males.

The median income for a household in the city was $26,771, and the median income for a family was $32,153. Males had a median income of $21,650 versus $18,750 for females. The per capita income for the city was $14,621. About 9.8% of families and 13.1% of the population were below the poverty line, including 18.0% of those under age 18 and 9.2% of those age 65 or over.

== Education ==
Mulberry is served by Northeast USD 246 public school district.

Mulberry High School was closed through school unification. The Mulberry High School mascot was Tigers.

== Media ==
The Mulberry Advance, a weekly newspaper, once gained national attention for having the smallest circulation of any newspaper in Kansas. As of 2023, it had 56 subscribers.
