= Dunkirk, Kansas =

Unincorporated community in Crawford County, Kansas

Coordinates: 37°29′04″N 94°44′31″W

Dunkirk is an unincorporated community in Crawford County, Kansas, United States.

== History ==
A post office was opened in Dunkirk in 1915, and remained in operation until it was discontinued in 1919. Dunkirk was originally a mining community with coal mines operated by the Wier Coal Company.
