= Kirkwood, Kansas =

Unincorporated community in Crawford County, Kansas, United States

Coordinates: 37°22′15″N 94°43′21″W

Kirkwood is an unincorporated community in Crawford County, Kansas, United States.

== History ==
Kirkwood had its start in about 1892 when Archie Kirkwood, a mining official, established a coal camp to which he added his name.
