= Erie Township, Neosho County, Kansas =

Township in Neosho County, Kansas, U.S.

Erie Township
- Township
- Location within Neosho County
- Coordinates: 37.601593°N 95.305398°W
- Country: United States
- State: Kansas
- County: Neosho

Area
  - Total: 47.874 sq mi (123.99 km^{2})
  - Land: 47.335 sq mi (122.60 km^{2})
  - Water: 0.539 sq mi (1.40 km^{2}) 1.13%

Population (2020)
  - Total: 1,232
  - Density: 26.03/sq mi (10.05/km^{2})
- Time zone: UTC-6 (CST)
  - Summer (DST): UTC-5 (CDT)
- Area code: 620

Erie Township is a township in Neosho County, Kansas, United States. As of the 2020 census, its population was 1,232.

== Geography ==
Erie Township covers an area of 47.874 square miles (123.99 square kilometers). The Neosho River flows through it.

=== Communities ===
- part of Erie

=== Adjacent townships ===
- Big Creek Township, Neosho County (north)
- Grant Township, Neosho County (northeast)
- Walnut Grove Township, Neosho County (east)
- Mission Township, Neosho County (southeast)
- Centerville Township, Neosho County (south)
- Chetopa Township, Neosho County (southwest)
- Canville Township, Neosho County (west)
- Tioga Township, Neosho County (northwest)

=== Major highways ===
- US-59
- K-146
