= Centerville Township, Neosho County, Kansas =

Township in Neosho County, Kansas, U.S.

Centerville Township
- Township
- Location within Neosho County
- Coordinates: 37.51147°N 95.298628°W
- Country: United States
- State: Kansas
- County: Neosho

Area
  - Total: 47.996 sq mi (124.31 km^{2})
  - Land: 47.576 sq mi (123.22 km^{2})
  - Water: 0.42 sq mi (1.1 km^{2}) 0.88%

Population (2020)
  - Total: 483
  - Density: 10.2/sq mi (3.92/km^{2})
- Time zone: UTC-6 (CST)
  - Summer (DST): UTC-5 (CDT)
- Area code: 620

Centerville Township is a township in Neosho County, Kansas, United States. As of the 2020 census, its population was 483.

== Geography ==
Centerville Township covers an area of 47.996 square miles (124.31 square kilometers). The Neosho River flows through it.

=== Communities ===
- part of Galesburg

=== Adjacent townships ===
- Erie Township, Neosho County (north)
- Walnut Grove Township, Neosho County (northeast)
- Mission Township, Neosho County (east)
- Lincoln Township, Neosho County (southeast)
- Ladore Township, Neosho County (south)
- Shiloh Township, Neosho County (southwest)
- Chetopa Township, Neosho County (west)
- Canville Township, Neosho County (northwest)

=== Major highways ===
- US-59
- K-47
