= Englevale, Kansas =

Unincorporated community in Crawford County, Kansas

- Unincorporated community
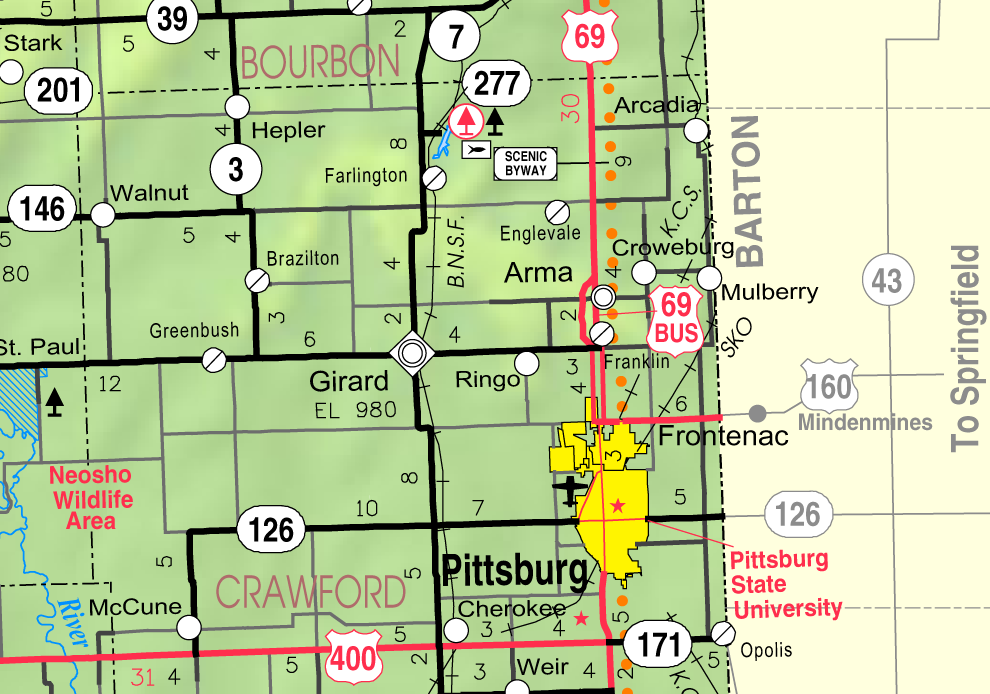
- KDOT map of Crawford County (legend)

- Location within Kansas Location within the United States
- Coordinates: 37°35′38″N 94°43′39″W
- Country: United States
- State: Kansas
- County: Crawford
- Founded: 1890
- Platted: 1890
- Named for: Dan Engle
- Elevation: 971 ft (296 m)
- Time zone: UTC-6 (CST)
  - Summer (DST): UTC-5 (CDT)
- Area code: 620
- FIPS code: 20-21325
- GNIS ID: 475154

Englevale is an unincorporated community in Lincoln Township, Crawford County, Kansas, United States.

== History ==
Englevale was laid out in the fall of 1890. It was named for Dan Engle, the original owner of the town site.

The post office in the community was established on 14 January 1891 and discontinued on 30 June 1954. Its name was originally "Calvin." The town was a stop on the Missouri Pacific Railroad.
