= Litchfield, Kansas =

Unincorporated community in Kansas, US

Coordinates: 37°26′27″N 94°38′59″W

Litchfield is an unincorporated community in Crawford County, Kansas, United States. It is located east of Frontenac at S 250th St and E 570th Ave.

== History ==
A post office was opened in Litchfield in 1878 (but was called Edwin until 1881), and remained in operation until it was discontinued in 1903.

Litchfield was known historically for its coal mining operations. During the 1880s, Litchfield had at least nine mines.
