= Brazilton, Kansas =

Unincorporated community in Crawford County, Kansas

Coordinates: 37°33′35″N 94°57′27″W

Brazilton is an unincorporated community in Crawford County, Kansas, United States. It located along highway K-3.

== History ==
Brazilton was named in 1882 for Thomas Brazil, a farmer who resided there.

A post office was opened in Brazilton in 1882, and remained in operation until it was discontinued in 1966.

Brazilton was a station and shipping point on the Pittsburg & Chanute division of the Atchison, Topeka and Santa Fe Railway. The railroad tracks were removed in the 1990s.
