= Cato, Kansas =

Unincorporated community in Crawford County, Kansas

- Unincorporated community
- Location within Kansas Location within the United States
- Coordinates: 37°40′04″N 94°44′24″W
- Country: United States
- State: Kansas
- County: Crawford
- Founded: 1854
- Elevation: 883 ft (269 m)
- Time zone: UTC-6 (CST)
  - Summer (DST): UTC-5 (CDT)
- Area code: 620
- FIPS code: 20-11100
- GNIS ID: 484708

Cato is an unincorporated community in Crawford County, Kansas, United States.

== History ==
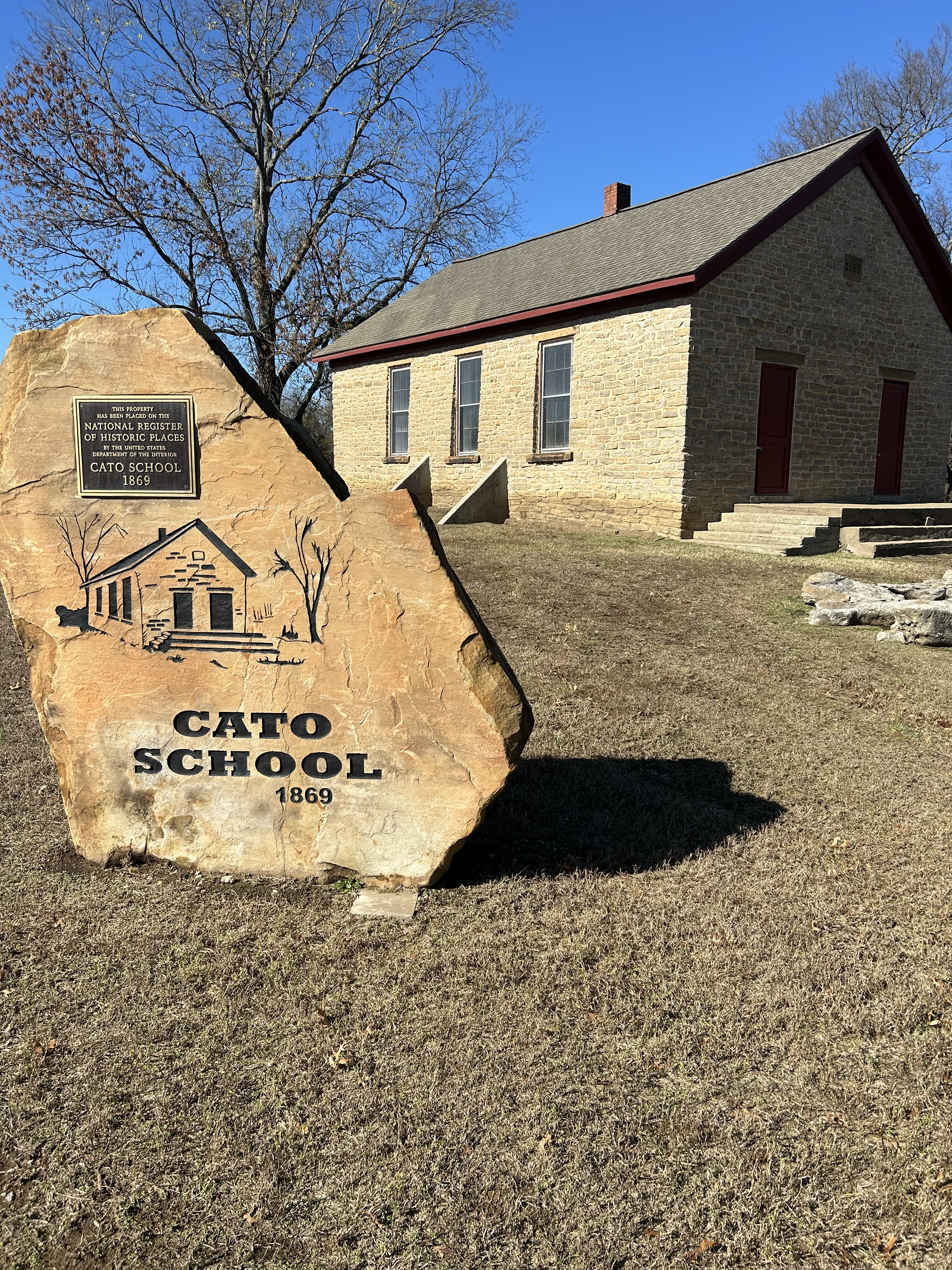
1869 Cato School (2024)

Cato was founded in 1854. By 1867, Cato contained a store, a blacksmith, and a sawmill.

Cato is believed to be the first community built in the Southeast Kansas area, and it has the distinction of having the first grist mill in Crawford County, the first coal mining operation, the first school in the county, and the first County Fair. Cato was never a large town, reaching its peak population in 1910 with 112 residents.

An old, one-room, stone school house built in 1869 is on the National Register of Historic Places. The stone school house, the Cato Christian Church built in 1915, and a stone bridge that was once on the stage coach route, are all that remain of the community.

== Area events ==
Each year the Cato Historical Preservation Association spends one weekend reminding residents and tourists of the pioneer days. The festival includes tours of the pioneer era community, live music, food, and re-enactments, occasionally "including a shoot-out between Missouri border roughians and Kansas lawmen".
