= South Radley, Kansas =

Unincorporated community in Crawford County, Kansas

Coordinates: 37°28′17″N 94°45′37″W

South Radley is an unincorporated community in Crawford County, Kansas, United States.

== History ==
South Radley was known historically for its coal mining operations.
