= Croweburg, Kansas =

Unincorporated community in Crawford County, Kansas

- CDP
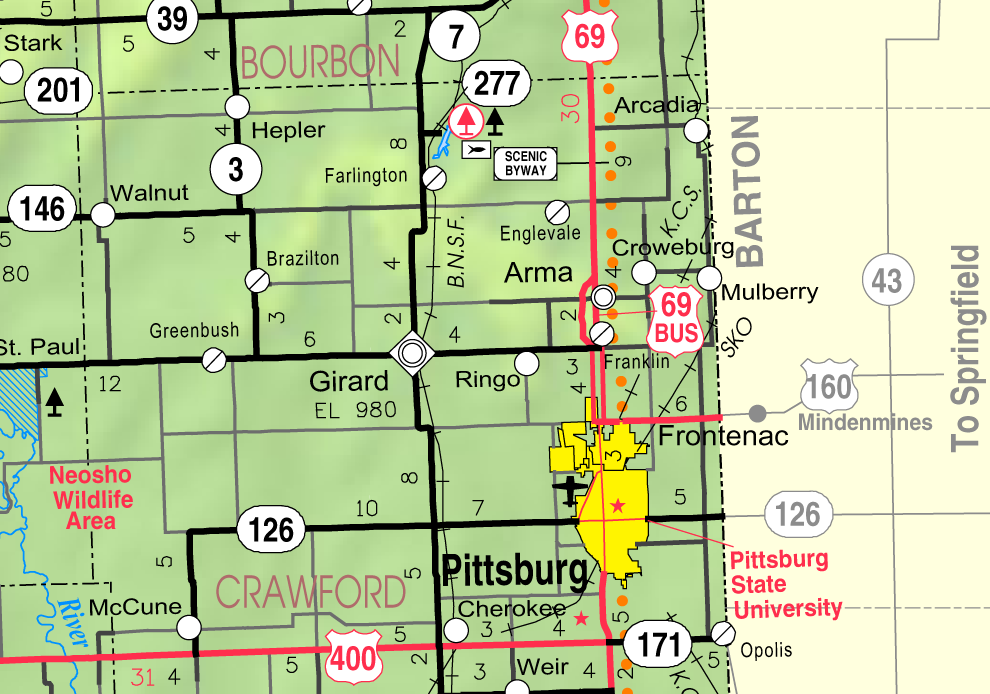
- KDOT map of Crawford County (legend)

- Location within Kansas Location within the United States
- Coordinates: 37°33′10″N 94°40′07″W
- Country: United States
- State: Kansas
- County: Crawford
- Elevation: 912 ft (278 m)

Population (2020)
  - Total: 92
- Time zone: UTC-6 (CST)
  - Summer (DST): UTC-5 (CDT)
- Area code: 620
- FIPS code: 20-16475
- GNIS ID: 2806470

Croweburg is a census-designated place (CDP) in Crawford County, Kansas, United States. As of the 2020 census, the population was 92.

== History ==
Croweburg was a station on the Joplin & Pittsburg electric line. The settlement was named after Crowe Coal Company and consisted of four coal mining camps, which were in operation from 1900 to 1940. Until 1912, Croweburg was a sundown town, where African Americans were not allowed to live.

A post office was opened in Croweburg in 1908, and remained in operation until it was discontinued in 1972.

== Demographics ==
Historical population
Census	Pop.	Note	%±
2020	92		—
U.S. Decennial Census

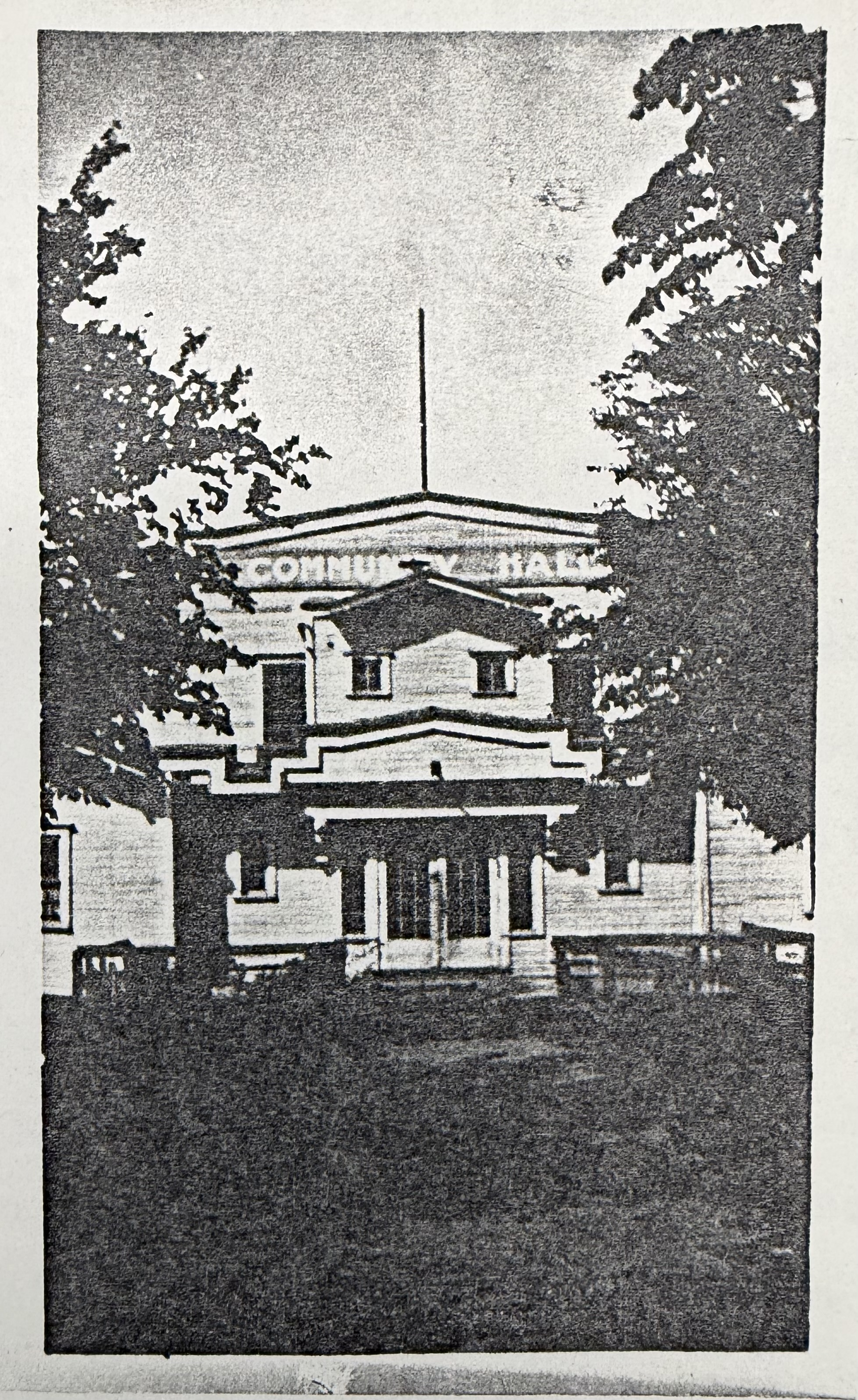
Community Hall c. 1930

The 2020 United States census counted 92 people, 32 households, and 20 families in Croweburg. The population density was 156.7 per square mile (60.5/km^{2}). There were 40 housing units at an average density of 68.1 per square mile (26.3/km^{2}). The racial makeup was 88.04% (81) white or European American (86.96% non-Hispanic white), 0.0% (0) black or African-American, 4.35% (4) Native American or Alaska Native, 0.0% (0) Asian, 0.0% (0) Pacific Islander or Native Hawaiian, 1.09% (1) from other races, and 6.52% (6) from two or more races. Hispanic or Latino of any race was 4.35% (4) of the population.

Of the 32 households, 25.0% had children under the age of 18; 56.2% were married couples living together; 15.6% had a female householder with no spouse or partner present. 9.4% of households consisted of individuals and 6.2% had someone living alone who was 65 years of age or older. The average household size was 2.9 and the average family size was 2.9. The percent of those with a bachelor's degree or higher was estimated to be 21.7% of the population.

21.7% of the population was under the age of 18, 10.9% from 18 to 24, 25.0% from 25 to 44, 27.2% from 45 to 64, and 15.2% who were 65 years of age or older. The median age was 40.0 years. For every 100 females, there were 64.3 males. For every 100 females ages 18 and older, there were 71.4 males.

The 2016–2020 5-year American Community Survey estimates show that the median household income was $88,207 (with a margin of error of +/- $34,712) and the median family income was $88,207 (+/- $34,712).

== See also ==
- List of sundown towns in the United States
