= Lincoln Township, Crawford County, Kansas =

Lincoln Township
- Township
- Location in Crawford County
- Coordinates: 37°36′55″N 094°41′41″W
- Country: United States
- State: Kansas
- County: Crawford

Area
  - Total: 70.08 sq mi (181.51 km^{2})
  - Land: 69.92 sq mi (181.09 km^{2})
  - Water: 0.16 sq mi (0.42 km^{2}) 0.23%
- Elevation: 974 ft (297 m)

Population (2020)
  - Total: 790
  - Density: 11/sq mi (4.4/km^{2})
- GNIS feature ID: 475027

Lincoln Township is a township in Crawford County, Kansas, United States. As of the 2020 decennial census, its population was 790.

== Geography ==
Lincoln Township covers an area of 70.08 square miles (181.5 km^{2}) and contains one incorporated settlement, Arcadia. According to the United States Geological Survey, it contains six cemeteries: Brown, Englevale, Fowler, McGonigle, Old Arcadia and Pleasant Valley Sheffield.

The streams of Bone Creek, Dry Branch and Richland Creek run through this township.
