= Sheridan Township, Crawford County, Kansas =

Sheridan Township
- Township
- Location in Crawford County
- Coordinates: 37°24′15″N 094°50′01″W
- Country: United States
- State: Kansas
- County: Crawford

Area
  - Total: 79.8 sq mi (206.7 km^{2})
  - Land: 79.56 sq mi (206.06 km^{2})
  - Water: 0.25 sq mi (0.64 km^{2}) 0.31%
- Elevation: 955 ft (291 m)

Population (2020)
  - Total: 1,273
  - Density: 16.00/sq mi (6.178/km^{2})
- GNIS feature ID: 0469628

Sheridan Township is a township in Crawford County, Kansas, United States. As of the 2020 census, its population was 1,273.

== Geography ==
Sheridan Township covers an area of 79.81 square miles (206.7 km^{2}) and contains one incorporated settlement, Cherokee. According to the USGS, it contains five cemeteries: Beulah, Cherokee, Meyers, Monmouth and Osage.

The streams of Grindstone Creek, Limestone Creek, Thunderbolt Creek and Wolf Creek run through this township.
