= Osage Township, Crawford County, Kansas =

Osage Township
- Township
- Location in Crawford County
- Coordinates: 37°24′30″N 095°02′09″W
- Country: United States
- State: Kansas
- County: Crawford

Area
  - Total: 54.58 sq mi (141.37 km^{2})
  - Land: 54.34 sq mi (140.75 km^{2})
  - Water: 0.24 sq mi (0.62 km^{2}) 0.44%
- Elevation: 920 ft (280 m)

Population (2020)
  - Total: 742
  - Density: 13.7/sq mi (5.27/km^{2})
- GNIS feature ID: 0469639

Osage Township is a township in Crawford County, Kansas, United States. As of the 2020 census, its population was 742.

== Geography ==
Osage Township covers an area of 54.58 square miles (141.4 km^{2}) and contains one incorporated settlement, McCune. According to the USGS, it contains four cemeteries: Dumbald, Frog, Mc Cune and Mount Carmel.
