= Red Onion, Kansas =

Unincorporated community in Crawford County, Kansas

Coordinates: 37°35′13″N 94°38′46″W

Red Onion is an unincorporated community in Crawford County, Kansas, United States.

== History ==
Red Onion was known historically for its coal mining operations.

== Geography ==
Red Onion is located in Crawford County, Kansas, and situated 860 feet above sea level.
