= Baker Township, Crawford County, Kansas =

Baker Township
- Township
- Location in Crawford County
- Coordinates: 37°24′24″N 094°40′28″W
- Country: United States
- State: Kansas
- County: Crawford

Area
  - Total: 56.8 sq mi (147.2 km^{2})
  - Land: 56.80 sq mi (147.12 km^{2})
  - Water: 0.031 sq mi (0.08 km^{2}) 0.05%
- Elevation: 920 ft (280 m)

Population (2020)
  - Total: 3,467
  - Density: 61.04/sq mi (23.57/km^{2})
- GNIS feature ID: 0469616

Baker Township is a township in Crawford County, Kansas, United States. As of the 2020 census, its population was 3,467.

== Geography ==
Baker Township covers an area of 56.83 square miles (147.2 km^{2}) surrounding the city of Pittsburg and a small part of the city of Frontenac. According to the USGS, it contains three cemeteries: Dietz, Frontenac and West Union.

The streams East Cow Creek, First Cow Creek and Second Cow Creek run through this township.
