= Arcadia, Kansas =

City in Crawford County, Kansas

- City
- Location within Crawford County and Kansas

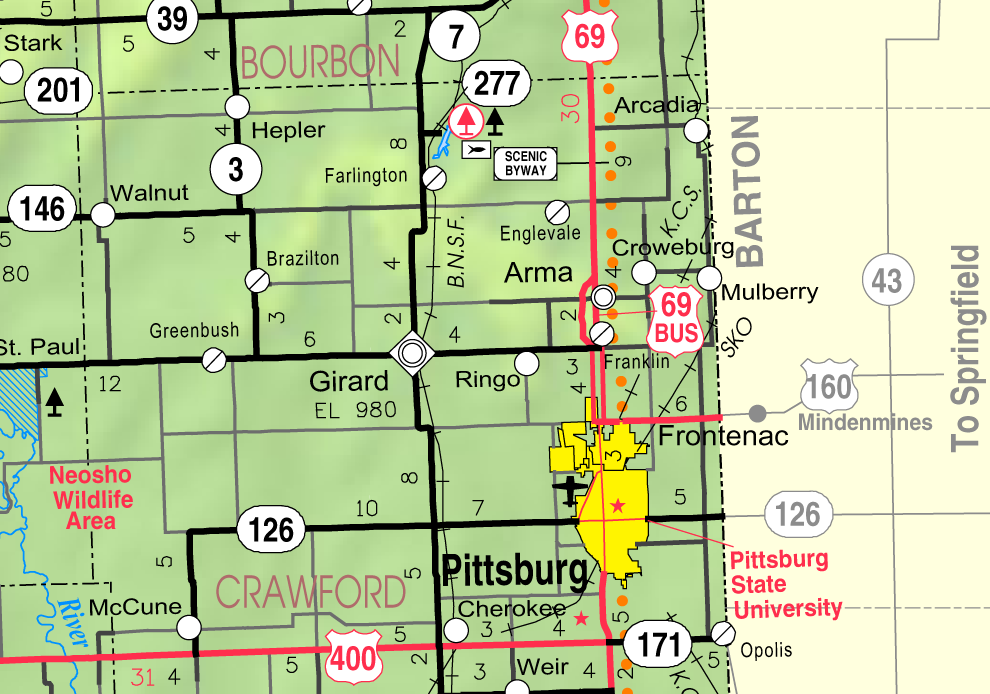
- KDOT map of Crawford County (legend)
- Coordinates: 37°38′28″N 94°37′26″W
- Country: United States
- State: Kansas
- County: Crawford
- Founded: 1862
- Named for: Arcadia, Greece

Area
  - Total: 0.44 sq mi (1.13 km^{2})
  - Land: 0.44 sq mi (1.13 km^{2})
  - Water: 0 sq mi (0.00 km^{2})
- Elevation: 824 ft (251 m)

Population (2020)
  - Total: 254
  - Density: 582/sq mi (225/km^{2})
- Time zone: UTC-6 (CST)
  - Summer (DST): UTC-5 (CDT)
- ZIP Code: 66711
- Area code: 620
- FIPS code: 20-02175
- GNIS ID: 2393974

Arcadia is a city in northeast Crawford County, Kansas, United States. As of the 2020 census, the population of the city was 254.

== History ==
Arcadia was founded in 1862. It was named for the ancient region of Arcadia, in Greece.

The first post office in Arcadia was established in June, 1867.

Arcadia was a station on the St. Louis–San Francisco Railway.

== Geography ==
The east edge of Arcadia is the Kansas-Missouri state border.

According to the United States Census Bureau, the city has a total area of 0.44 square miles (1.14 km^{2}), all land.

== Demographics ==
Historical population
Census	Pop.	Note	%±
1890	518		—
1900	538		3.9%
1910	694		29.0%
1920	1,175		69.3%
1930	925		−21.3%
1940	843		−8.9%
1950	572		−32.1%
1960	507		−11.4%
1970	388		−23.5%
1980	460		18.6%
1990	338		−26.5%
2000	391		15.7%
2010	310		−20.7%
2020	254		−18.1%
U.S. Decennial Census

=== 2020 census ===
The 2020 United States census counted 254 people, 128 households, and 69 families in Arcadia. The population density was 585.3 per square mile (226.0/km^{2}). There were 152 housing units at an average density of 350.2 per square mile (135.2/km^{2}). The racial makeup was 93.31% (237) white or European American (92.91% non-Hispanic white), 0.0% (0) black or African-American, 0.39% (1) Native American or Alaska Native, 0.0% (0) Asian, 0.0% (0) Pacific Islander or Native Hawaiian, 1.18% (3) from other races, and 5.12% (13) from two or more races. Hispanic or Latino of any race was 1.97% (5) of the population.

Of the 128 households, 21.1% had children under the age of 18; 32.8% were married couples living together; 27.3% had a female householder with no spouse or partner present. 45.3% of households consisted of individuals and 18.0% had someone living alone who was 65 years of age or older. The average household size was 2.3 and the average family size was 2.6. The percent of those with a bachelor's degree or higher was estimated to be 9.1% of the population.

22.4% of the population was under the age of 18, 4.7% from 18 to 24, 22.0% from 25 to 44, 28.7% from 45 to 64, and 22.0% who were 65 years of age or older. The median age was 45.5 years. For every 100 females, there were 89.6 males. For every 100 females ages 18 and older, there were 93.1 males.

The 2016–2020 5-year American Community Survey estimates show that the median household income was $36,406 (with a margin of error of +/- $26,850) and the median family income was $46,047 (+/- $6,173). The median income for those above 16 years old was $35,000 (+/- $17,805). Approximately, 23.6% of families and 37.2% of the population were below the poverty line, including 36.3% of those under the age of 18 and 32.0% of those ages 65 or over.

=== 2010 census ===
As of the census of 2010, there were 310 people, 136 households, and 79 families living in the city. The population density was 704.5 inhabitants per square mile (272.0/km^{2}). There were 168 housing units at an average density of 381.8 per square mile (147.4/km^{2}). The racial makeup of the city was 91.9% White, 1.3% African American, 1.0% Native American, 1.6% from other races, and 4.2% from two or more races. Hispanic or Latino of any race were 3.2% of the population.

There were 136 households, of which 30.9% had children under the age of 18 living with them, 40.4% were married couples living together, 13.2% had a female householder with no husband present, 4.4% had a male householder with no wife present, and 41.9% were non-families. 34.6% of all households were made up of individuals, and 10.3% had someone living alone who was 65 years of age or older. The average household size was 2.28 and the average family size was 2.95.

The median age in the city was 42.2 years. 24.8% of residents were under the age of 18; 6.1% were between the ages of 18 and 24; 23.5% were from 25 to 44; 31.3% were from 45 to 64; and 14.2% were 65 years of age or older. The gender makeup of the city was 50.3% male and 49.7% female.

=== 2000 census ===
As of the census of 2000, there were 391 people, 156 households, and 105 families living in the city. The population density was 884.0 inhabitants per square mile (341.3/km^{2}). There were 179 housing units at an average density of 404.7 per square mile (156.3/km^{2}). The racial makeup of the city was 96.16% White, 0.51% African American, 1.28% Native American, 1.02% from other races, and 1.02% from two or more races. Hispanic or Latino of any race were 0.26% of the population.

There were 156 households, out of which 35.9% had children under the age of 18 living with them, 45.5% were married couples living together, 15.4% had a female householder with no husband present, and 32.1% were non-families. 28.2% of all households were made up of individuals, and 13.5% had someone living alone who was 65 years of age or older. The average household size was 2.51 and the average family size was 3.08.

In the city, the population was spread out, with 27.9% under the age of 18, 11.0% from 18 to 24, 27.1% from 25 to 44, 20.7% from 45 to 64, and 13.3% who were 65 years of age or older. The median age was 34 years. For every 100 females, there were 91.7 males. For every 100 females age 18 and over, there were 95.8 males.

The median income for a household in the city was $21,750, and the median income for a family was $27,386. Males had a median income of $22,500 versus $17,321 for females. The per capita income for the city was $10,674. About 17.2% of families and 24.2% of the population were below the poverty line, including 31.2% of those under age 18 and 11.5% of those age 65 or over.
