= Cottage Grove Township, Kansas =

Cottage Grove Township
- Township
- Location in Allen County
- Coordinates: 37°46′10″N 095°19′26″W
- Country: United States
- State: Kansas
- County: Allen

Area
  - Total: 37.3 sq mi (96.5 km^{2})
  - Land: 36.9 sq mi (95.6 km^{2})
  - Water: 0.35 sq mi (0.9 km^{2}) 1.0%
- Elevation: 1,043 ft (318 m)

Population (2010)
  - Total: 246
  - Density: 6.7/sq mi (2.6/km^{2})
- GNIS feature ID: 0474731

Cottage Grove Township is one of twelve townships in Allen County, Kansas, United States. As of the 2010 census, its population was 246.

== Geography ==
Cottage Grove Township covers an area of 37.3 square miles (96.5 km^{2}) and contains no known communities. According to the USGS, it contains two cemeteries: Kerns and Saint Peters.

The streams of Coal Creek, Goose Creek and Rocky Branch run through this township.
