= Walnut Township, Bourbon County, Kansas =

Walnut Township
- Township
- Location in Bourbon County
- Coordinates: 37°43′05″N 095°00′26″W
- Country: United States
- State: Kansas
- County: Bourbon

Area
  - Total: 59.49 sq mi (154.09 km^{2})
  - Land: 59.42 sq mi (153.89 km^{2})
  - Water: 0.073 sq mi (0.19 km^{2}) 0.12%
- Elevation: 1,047 ft (319 m)

Population (2000)
  - Total: 135
  - Density: 2.3/sq mi (0.9/km^{2})
- GNIS feature ID: 0474748

Walnut Township is a township in Bourbon County, Kansas, United States. As of the 2000 census, its population was 135.

== Geography ==
Walnut Township covers an area of 59.49 square miles (154.1 km^{2}) and contains no incorporated settlements. According to the USGS, it contains one cemetery, Rosedale.

The streams of Owl Creek and Prong Creek run through this township.
