= Walnut, Kansas =

City in Crawford County, Kansas

- City
- Location within Crawford County and Kansas

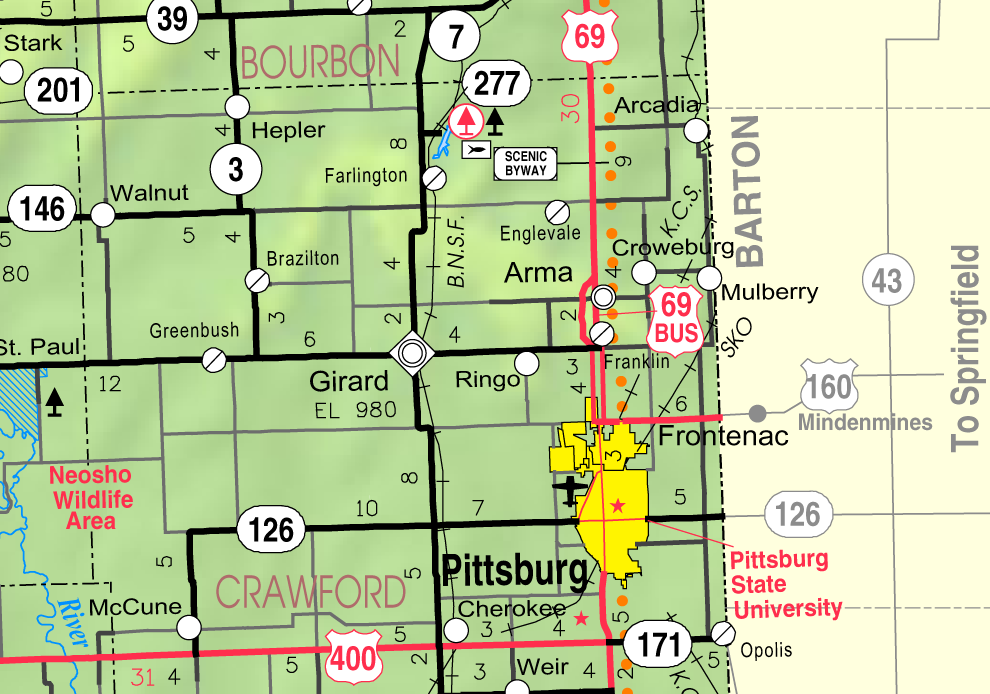
- KDOT map of Crawford County (legend)
- Coordinates: 37°36′06″N 95°04′27″W
- Country: United States
- State: Kansas
- County: Crawford
- Founded: 1871
- Incorporated: 1874
- Named for: Little Walnut Creek

Area
  - Total: 1.49 sq mi (3.86 km^{2})
  - Land: 1.47 sq mi (3.82 km^{2})
  - Water: 0.015 sq mi (0.04 km^{2})
- Elevation: 929 ft (283 m)

Population (2020)
  - Total: 187
  - Density: 127/sq mi (49.0/km^{2})
- Time zone: UTC-6 (CST)
  - Summer (DST): UTC-5 (CDT)
- ZIP Code: 66780
- Area code: 620
- FIPS code: 20-74950
- GNIS ID: 2397181
- Website: cityofwalnutkansas.wixsite.com/welcome

Walnut is a city in Crawford County, Kansas, United States. As of the 2020 census, the population of the city was 187.

== History ==
Walnut was originally called Glenwood, and under the latter name laid out in 1871. In 1874, it was renamed Walnut after the Little Walnut Creek, on which it is located.

The first post office at Walnut was established in April 1873. Prior to April 1877, the post office's name was officially called Walnut Station. Walnut was served by both the Missouri-Kansas-Texas Railroad, and the Atchison, Topeka & Santa Fe Railroad.

== Geography ==
According to the United States Census Bureau, the city has a total area of 1.00 square mile (2.59 km^{2}), of which 0.99 square miles (2.56 km^{2}) is land and 0.01 square miles (0.03 km^{2}) is water.

=== Climate ===
The climate in this area is characterized by hot, humid summers and generally mild to cool winters. According to the Köppen Climate Classification system, Walnut has a humid subtropical climate, abbreviated "Cfa" on climate maps.

== Demographics ==
Historical population
Census	Pop.	Note	%±
1880	196		—
1890	539		175.0%
1900	603		11.9%
1910	639		6.0%
1920	650		1.7%
1930	553		−14.9%
1940	544		−1.6%
1950	534		−1.8%
1960	381		−28.7%
1970	330		−13.4%
1980	308		−6.7%
1990	214		−30.5%
2000	221		3.3%
2010	220		−0.5%
2020	187		−15.0%
U.S. Decennial Census

=== 2010 census ===
As of the census of 2010, there were 220 people, 84 households, and 57 families living in the city. The population density was 222.2 inhabitants per square mile (85.8/km^{2}). There were 108 housing units at an average density of 109.1 per square mile (42.1/km^{2}). The racial makeup of the city was 96.8% White, 1.8% Native American, 0.5% from other races, and 0.9% from two or more races. Hispanic or Latino of any race were 3.6% of the population.

There were 84 households, of which 40.5% had children under the age of 18 living with them, 53.6% were married couples living together, 9.5% had a female householder with no husband present, 4.8% had a male householder with no wife present, and 32.1% were non-families. 29.8% of all households were made up of individuals, and 7.2% had someone living alone who was 65 years of age or older. The average household size was 2.62 and the average family size was 3.26.

The median age in the city was 30.8 years. 34.1% of residents were under the age of 18; 5.5% were between the ages of 18 and 24; 30% were from 25 to 44; 21.4% were from 45 to 64; and 9.1% were 65 years of age or older. The gender makeup of the city was 49.1% male and 50.9% female.

=== 2000 census ===
As of the census of 2000, there were 221 people, 91 households, and 55 families living in the city. The population density was 223.1 inhabitants per square mile (86.1/km^{2}). There were 116 housing units at an average density of 117.1 per square mile (45.2/km^{2}). The racial makeup of the city was 98.19% White, 0.90% Asian, and 0.90% from two or more races. Hispanic or Latino of any race were 0.45% of the population.

There were 91 households, out of which 31.9% had children under the age of 18 living with them, 53.8% were married couples living together, 3.3% had a female householder with no husband present, and 38.5% were non-families. 36.3% of all households were made up of individuals, and 16.5% had someone living alone who was 65 years of age or older. The average household size was 2.43 and the average family size was 3.21.

In the city, the population was spread out, with 29.4% under the age of 18, 9.0% from 18 to 24, 24.9% from 25 to 44, 23.5% from 45 to 64, and 13.1% who were 65 years of age or older. The median age was 36 years. For every 100 females, there were 106.5 males. For every 100 females age 18 and over, there were 102.6 males.

The median income for a household in the city was $24,000, and the median income for a family was $37,083. Males had a median income of $21,250 versus $23,750 for females. The per capita income for the city was $12,920. About 3.3% of families and 10.6% of the population were below the poverty line, including none of those under the age of eighteen and 25.0% of those 65 or over.

== Economy ==
The economy of Walnut is mostly agricultural based.
