= McCune, Kansas =

City in Crawford County, Kansas

- City
- Location within Crawford County and Kansas

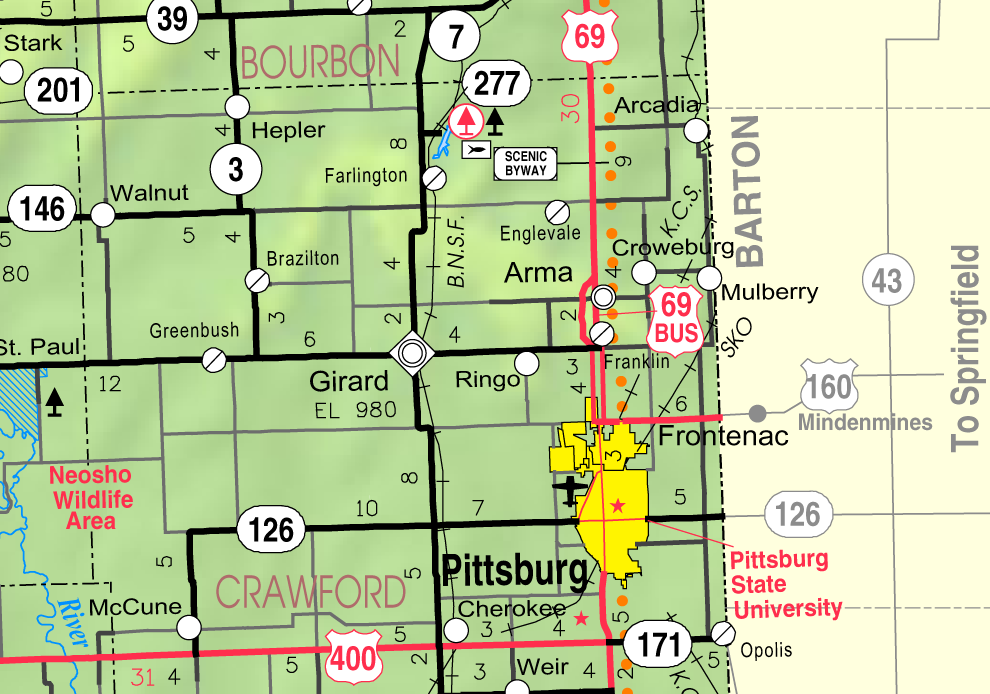
- KDOT map of Crawford County (legend)
- Coordinates: 37°21′14″N 95°01′09″W
- Country: United States
- State: Kansas
- County: Crawford
- Founded: 1878
- Incorporated: 1881
- Named for: Isaac McCune

Area
  - Total: 0.32 sq mi (0.82 km^{2})
  - Land: 0.32 sq mi (0.82 km^{2})
  - Water: 0 sq mi (0.00 km^{2})
- Elevation: 919 ft (280 m)

Population (2020)
  - Total: 370
  - Density: 1,200/sq mi (450/km^{2})
- Time zone: UTC-6 (CST)
  - Summer (DST): UTC-5 (CDT)
- ZIP Code: 66753
- Area code: 620
- FIPS code: 20-43725
- GNIS ID: 2395063

McCune is a city in Crawford County, Kansas, United States. As of the 2020 census, the population of the city was 370.

== History ==
The first post office in McCune was established in August, 1878.

McCune was laid out in 1879. It was named for its founder, Isaac McCune. McCune was incorporated as a city in 1881.

McCune was located on the St. Louis–San Francisco Railway's Parsons subdivision. The grain elevator in McCune still stands, and was the largest on this rail line.

== Geography ==
According to the United States Census Bureau, the city has a total area of 0.31 square miles (0.80 km^{2}), all land.

=== Climate ===
The climate in this area is characterized by hot, humid summers and generally mild to cool winters. According to the Köppen Climate Classification system, McCune has a humid subtropical climate, abbreviated "Cfa" on climate maps.

== Demographics ==
Historical population
Census	Pop.	Note	%±
1880	170		—
1890	700		311.8%
1900	657		−6.1%
1910	736		12.0%
1920	591		−19.7%
1930	584		−1.2%
1940	556		−4.8%
1950	532		−4.3%
1960	433		−18.6%
1970	487		12.5%
1980	528		8.4%
1990	462		−12.5%
2000	426		−7.8%
2010	405		−4.9%
2020	370		−8.6%
U.S. Decennial Census

=== 2020 census ===
The 2020 United States census counted 370 people, 155 households, and 104 families in McCune. The population density was 1,163.5 per square mile (449.2/km^{2}). There were 187 housing units at an average density of 588.1 per square mile (227.0/km^{2}). The racial makeup was 88.11% (326) white or European American (87.84% non-Hispanic white), 0.81% (3) black or African-American, 2.43% (9) Native American or Alaska Native, 0.0% (0) Asian, 0.0% (0) Pacific Islander or Native Hawaiian, 0.0% (0) from other races, and 8.65% (32) from two or more races. Hispanic or Latino of any race was 1.62% (6) of the population.

Of the 155 households, 34.2% had children under the age of 18; 47.7% were married couples living together; 18.7% had a female householder with no spouse or partner present. 29.0% of households consisted of individuals and 14.2% had someone living alone who was 65 years of age or older. The average household size was 2.2 and the average family size was 3.0. The percent of those with a bachelor's degree or higher was estimated to be 15.9% of the population.

23.8% of the population was under the age of 18, 10.0% from 18 to 24, 23.0% from 25 to 44, 26.8% from 45 to 64, and 16.5% who were 65 years of age or older. The median age was 39.6 years. For every 100 females, there were 88.8 males. For every 100 females ages 18 and older, there were 88.0 males.

The 2016–2020 5-year American Community Survey estimates show that the median household income was $33,750 (with a margin of error of +/- $12,611) and the median family income was $65,357 (+/- $17,326). Males had a median income of $33,036 (+/- $12,826) versus $30,357 (+/- $8,642) for females. The median income for those above 16 years old was $31,094 (+/- $6,310). Approximately, 23.5% of families and 22.3% of the population were below the poverty line, including 27.5% of those under the age of 18 and 22.9% of those ages 65 or over.

=== 2010 census ===
As of the census of 2010, there were 405 people, 169 households, and 110 families living in the city. The population density was 1,306.5 inhabitants per square mile (504.4/km^{2}). There were 207 housing units at an average density of 667.7 per square mile (257.8/km^{2}). The racial makeup of the city was 93.6% White, 2.5% Native American, 0.5% Asian, 0.7% from other races, and 2.7% from two or more races. Hispanic or Latino of any race were 2.2% of the population.

There were 169 households, of which 35.5% had children under the age of 18 living with them, 50.9% were married couples living together, 8.3% had a female householder with no husband present, 5.9% had a male householder with no wife present, and 34.9% were non-families. 28.4% of all households were made up of individuals, and 9.5% had someone living alone who was 65 years of age or older. The average household size was 2.40 and the average family size was 2.92.

The median age in the city was 39.4 years. 24.9% of residents were under the age of 18; 9.4% were between the ages of 18 and 24; 22.7% were from 25 to 44; 29.4% were from 45 to 64; and 13.6% were 65 years of age or older. The gender makeup of the city was 51.1% male and 48.9% female.

=== 2000 census ===
As of the census of 2000, there were 426 people, 173 households, and 115 families living in the city. The population density was 1,384.6 inhabitants per square mile (534.6/km^{2}). There were 203 housing units at an average density of 659.8 per square mile (254.8/km^{2}). The racial makeup of the city was 97.65% White, 0.94% Native American, 0.23% Asian, 0.23% from other races, and 0.94% from two or more races. Hispanic or Latino of any race were 1.41% of the population.

There were 173 households, out of which 40.5% had children under the age of 18 living with them, 54.3% were married couples living together, 7.5% had a female householder with no husband present, and 33.5% were non-families. 30.6% of all households were made up of individuals, and 13.3% had someone living alone who was 65 years of age or older. The average household size was 2.46 and the average family size was 3.10.

In the city, the population was spread out, with 29.1% under the age of 18, 8.9% from 18 to 24, 27.9% from 25 to 44, 22.1% from 45 to 64, and 12.0% who were 65 years of age or older. The median age was 35 years. For every 100 females, there were 105.8 males. For every 100 females age 18 and over, there were 96.1 males.

The median income for a household in the city was $30,347, and the median income for a family was $34,375. Males had a median income of $29,375 versus $20,625 for females. The per capita income for the city was $12,563. About 12.9% of families and 16.7% of the population were below the poverty line, including 18.0% of those under age 18 and 6.9% of those age 65 or over.

== Education ==
McCune is a part of USD 247. The Southeast High School mascot is Lancers.

McCune High School was closed through school unification. The McCune High School mascot was McCune Eagles.
