= Hepler, Kansas =

City in Crawford County, Kansas

- City
- Location within Crawford County and Kansas

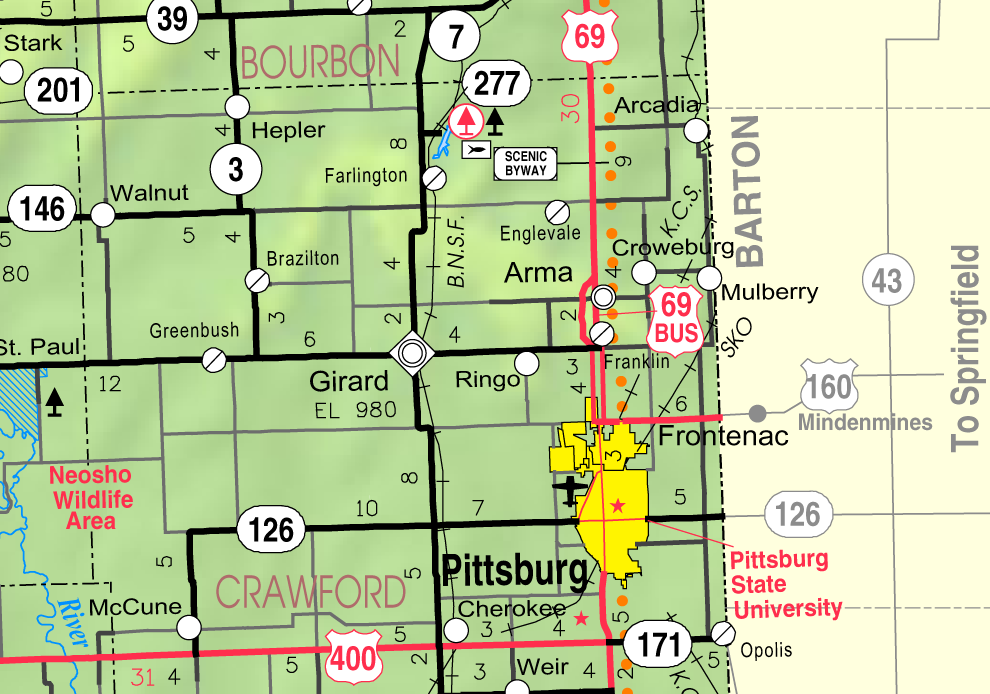
- KDOT map of Crawford County (legend)
- Coordinates: 37°39′49″N 94°58′11″W
- Country: United States
- State: Kansas
- County: Crawford
- Founded: 1871
- Incorporated: 1887
- Named for: B.F. Hepler

Area
  - Total: 1.01 sq mi (2.61 km^{2})
  - Land: 1.00 sq mi (2.59 km^{2})
  - Water: 0.0077 sq mi (0.02 km^{2})
- Elevation: 997 ft (304 m)

Population (2020)
  - Total: 90
  - Density: 90/sq mi (35/km^{2})
- Time zone: UTC-6 (CST)
  - Summer (DST): UTC-5 (CDT)
- ZIP Code: 66746
- Area code: 620
- FIPS code: 20-31375
- GNIS ID: 2394357

Hepler is a city in Crawford County, Kansas, United States. As of the 2020 census, the population of the city was 90.

== History ==
Hepler was founded in 1871. It was named for B.F. Hepler, president of the company that laid out the town.

The first post office in Hepler was established in June 1871.

Hepler became a significant shipping point of cattle and grain on the Missouri–Kansas–Texas Railroad.

== Geography ==
According to the United States Census Bureau, the city has a total area of 0.77 square miles (1.99 km^{2}), of which 0.76 square miles (1.97 km^{2}) is land and 0.01 square miles (0.03 km^{2}) is water. The carboniferous fossil formation Hepler Unit is in the vicinity.

== Demographics ==
Historical population
Census	Pop.	Note	%±
1880	100		—
1890	269		169.0%
1900	215		−20.1%
1910	276		28.4%
1920	241		−12.7%
1930	210		−12.9%
1940	259		23.3%
1950	224		−13.5%
1960	178		−20.5%
1970	152		−14.6%
1980	165		8.6%
1990	150		−9.1%
2000	154		2.7%
2010	132		−14.3%
2020	90		−31.8%
U.S. Decennial Census

=== 2020 census ===
The 2020 United States census counted 90 people, 41 households, and 31 families in Hepler. The population density was 90.1 per square mile (34.8/km^{2}). There were 56 housing units at an average density of 56.1 per square mile (21.6/km^{2}). The racial makeup was 84.44% (76) white or European American (84.44% non-Hispanic white), 0.0% (0) black or African-American, 1.11% (1) Native American or Alaska Native, 0.0% (0) Asian, 0.0% (0) Pacific Islander or Native Hawaiian, 0.0% (0) from other races, and 14.44% (13) from two or more races. Hispanic or Latino of any race was 12.22% (11) of the population.

Of the 41 households, 29.3% had children under the age of 18; 51.2% were married couples living together; 26.8% had a female householder with no spouse or partner present. 17.1% of households consisted of individuals and 12.2% had someone living alone who was 65 years of age or older. The average household size was 3.2 and the average family size was 3.6. The percent of those with a bachelor's degree or higher was estimated to be 11.1% of the population.

13.3% of the population was under the age of 18, 13.3% from 18 to 24, 22.2% from 25 to 44, 35.6% from 45 to 64, and 15.6% who were 65 years of age or older. The median age was 46.5 years. For every 100 females, there were 100.0 males. For every 100 females ages 18 and older, there were 100.0 males.

The 2016–2020 5-year American Community Survey estimates show that the median household income was $37,188 (with a margin of error of +/- $12,799) and the median family income was $29,432 (+/- $23,690). Males had a median income of $32,500 (+/- $23,312) versus $14,813 (+/- $11,996) for females. The median income for those above 16 years old was $23,125 (+/- $18,497). Approximately, 27.0% of families and 39.4% of the population were below the poverty line, including 50.0% of those under the age of 18 and 40.0% of those ages 65 or over.

=== 2010 census ===
As of the census of 2010, there were 132 people, 54 households, and 37 families living in the city. The population density was 173.7 inhabitants per square mile (67.1/km^{2}). There were 68 housing units at an average density of 89.5 per square mile (34.6/km^{2}). The racial makeup of the city was 99.2% White and 0.8% from other races. Hispanic or Latino of any race were 0.8% of the population.

There were 54 households, of which 25.9% had children under the age of 18 living with them, 59.3% were married couples living together, 1.9% had a female householder with no husband present, 7.4% had a male householder with no wife present, and 31.5% were non-families. 25.9% of all households were made up of individuals, and 11.1% had someone living alone who was 65 years of age or older. The average household size was 2.44 and the average family size was 2.97.

The median age in the city was 44.2 years. 22% of residents were under the age of 18; 6% were between the ages of 18 and 24; 25% were from 25 to 44; 31.8% were from 45 to 64; and 15.2% were 65 years of age or older. The gender makeup of the city was 52.3% male and 47.7% female.

=== 2000 census ===
As of the census of 2000, there were 154 people, 59 households, and 36 families living in the city. The population density was 201.3 inhabitants per square mile (77.7/km^{2}). There were 69 housing units at an average density of 90.2 per square mile (34.8/km^{2}). The racial makeup of the city was 94.81% White, 0.65% African American, 3.90% Native American, and 0.65% from two or more races.

There were 59 households, out of which 37.3% had children under the age of 18 living with them, 57.6% were married couples living together, and 37.3% were non-families. 35.6% of all households were made up of individuals, and 16.9% had someone living alone who was 65 years of age or older. The average household size was 2.61 and the average family size was 3.38.

In the city, the population was spread out, with 34.4% under the age of 18, 7.1% from 18 to 24, 22.1% from 25 to 44, 16.9% from 45 to 64, and 19.5% who were 65 years of age or older. The median age was 34 years. For every 100 females, there were 105.3 males. For every 100 females age 18 and over, there were 110.4 males.

The median income for a household in the city was $26,500, and the median income for a family was $36,500. Males had a median income of $21,250 versus $22,500 for females. The per capita income for the city was $12,475. About 10.9% of families and 17.0% of the population were below the poverty line, including 26.4% of those under the age of eighteen and none of those 65 or over.
