= Walnut Township, Crawford County, Kansas =

Walnut Township
- Township
- Location in Crawford County
- Coordinates: 37°37′00″N 095°00′56″W
- Country: United States
- State: Kansas
- County: Crawford

Area
  - Total: 64.19 sq mi (166.24 km^{2})
  - Land: 64.01 sq mi (165.79 km^{2})
  - Water: 0.17 sq mi (0.45 km^{2}) 0.27%
- Elevation: 938 ft (286 m)

Population (2020)
  - Total: 487
  - Density: 7.61/sq mi (2.94/km^{2})
- GNIS feature ID: 0474991

Walnut Township is a township in Crawford County, Kansas, United States. As of the 2020 census, its population was 487.

== Geography ==
Walnut Township covers an area of 64.18 square miles (166.2 km^{2}) and contains two incorporated settlements: Hepler and Walnut. According to the USGS, it contains three cemeteries: Glenwood, Lutheran and Walnut.

The stream of Pony Creek runs through this township.
