= Crawford County, Kansas =

County in Kansas, United States

- County
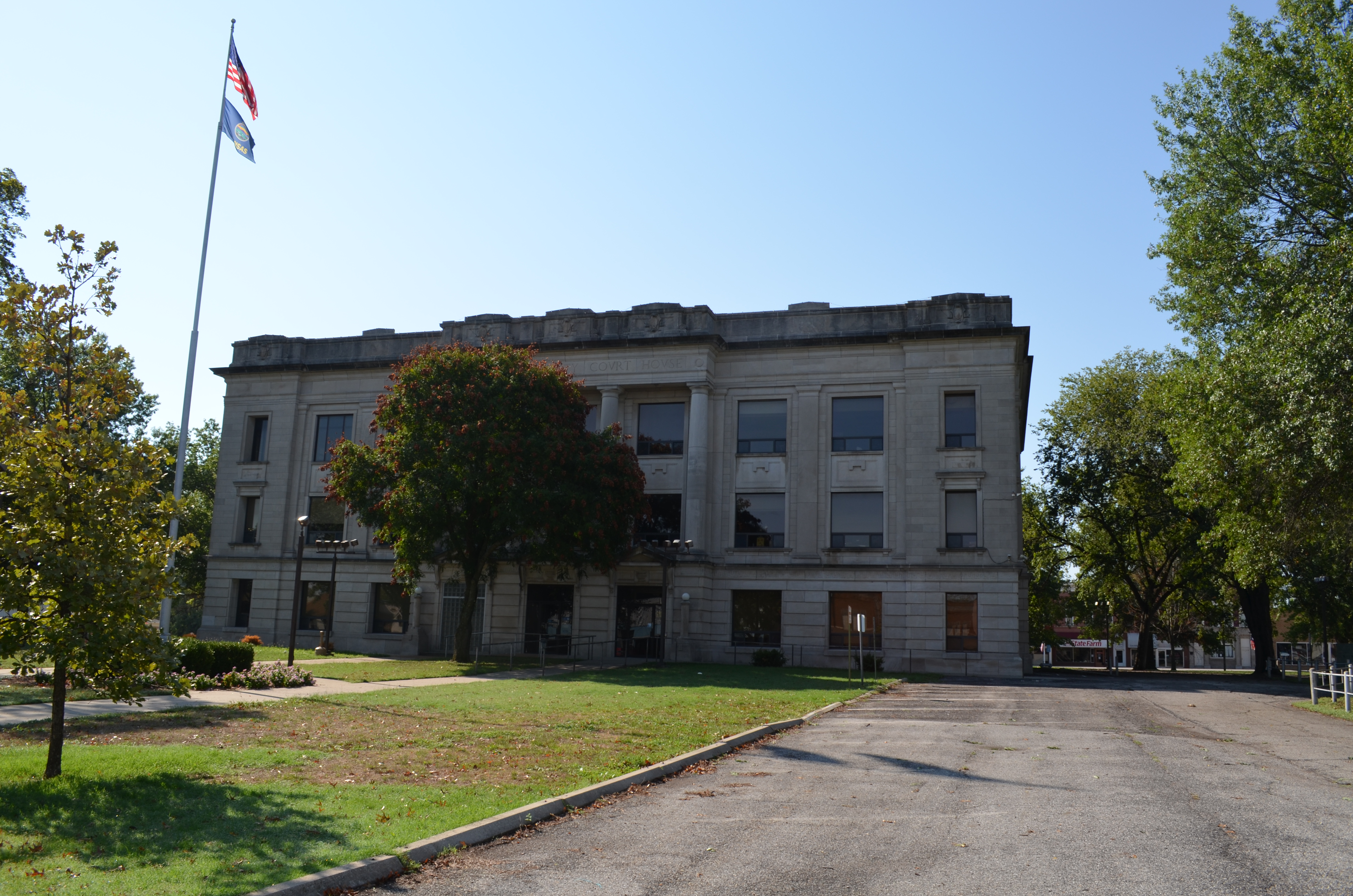
- Crawford County Courthouse in Girard (2012)

- Location within the U.S. state of Kansas
- Country: United States
- State: Kansas
- Founded: February 13, 1867
- Named for: Samuel J. Crawford
- Seat: Girard
- Largest city: Pittsburg

Area
  - Total: 595 sq mi (1,540 km^{2})
  - Land: 590 sq mi (1,500 km^{2})
  - Water: 5.3 sq mi (14 km^{2}) 0.9%

Population (2020)
  - Total: 38,972
  - Estimate (2025): 39,008 ▲
  - Density: 66/sq mi (26/km^{2})
- Time zone: UTC−6 (Central)
  - Summer (DST): UTC−5 (CDT)
- Area code: 620
- Congressional district: 2nd
- Website: CrawfordCountyKansas.org

Crawford County is a county located in Southeast Kansas. Its county seat is Girard, and its most populous city is Pittsburg. As of the 2020 census, the county population was 38,972. The county was named in honor of Samuel Crawford, the third governor of Kansas. Pittsburg State University is located in Crawford County.

== History ==
=== Early history ===
For many millennia, the Great Plains of North America was inhabited by nomadic Native Americans. From the 16th century to 18th century, the Kingdom of France claimed ownership of large parts of North America. In 1762, after the British defeated France in the French and Indian War, France secretly ceded New France to Spain, per the Treaty of Fontainebleau.

=== 19th century ===
In 1802, Spain returned most of the former New France land west of the Mississippi to France, but kept title to about 7,500 square miles. In 1803, the United States acquired much of the West and most of the land for modern-day Kansas as part of the 828,000-square mile Louisiana Purchase, at a cost of 2.83 cents per acre.

In 1854, the Kansas Territory was organized, and in 1861 Kansas was admitted as the 34th U.S. state. The preceding years had been filled with violence as settlers arrived on both sides of the slavery question; the residents voting for Kansas to enter as a free state were the majority. In 1867, Crawford County was established (formed from Bourbon and Cherokee counties) on the Cherokee Neutral Lands, which were originally established as a buffer zone between the Osage tribe and the State of Missouri. It is named for Samuel J. Crawford, who was the governor in office at the time.

=== 20th century ===
In the early 20th century, Crawford County was often referred to as the "Little Balkans", because of the many immigrants who came here from that area of Europe. They came to work in the mines, industrial work that did not require much English in the beginning. This area was the site of a number of illegal bootlegging operations, most of which were organized by immigrants in order to supplement their meager earnings as strip miners. During his term, Governor Walter R. Stubbs of Kansas made it his mission to stamp out this practice. According to the criminal justice scholar Ken Peak, "The [Little] Balkans drove [Stubbs] absolutely nuts. He had his hands full and sent people down to the Balkans to clean it up". Despite this crack down, however, the governor was unable to eradicate the crime completely from the area.

With its high concentration of poor industrial workers Crawford County became a hotbed of socialist politics and organized labor activity. The presence of the Pittsburg-Weir coalfield in Crawford County encouraged an influx of migrant workers from eastern and southern Europe. These migrants coalesced into company towns centered on the region's mines. The fraternal organizations which sprung about in these communities cross ethnic and linguistic barriers and provided assembly places for labor organization. A large portion of the county's coal miners were members of the United Mine Workers of America.

=== 21st century ===
On Sunday, May 4, 2003, a violent F4 tornado touched down in western Crawford County, several miles west of Frontenac at around 4:40 p.m. The tornado remained on the ground throughout Crawford County until it entered neighboring Barton County, Missouri—traveling a total of 35 miles (56 km) and ending near Liberal, Missouri. The communities of Ringo, Franklin, and Mulberry, all in Crawford County, were devastated. The tornado cut a path of destruction roughly one quarter mile wide. Several F4 tornadoes hit Kansas, Missouri, and several other states that day, including the Kansas City metropolitan area. Six deaths were reported in Kansas, and Governor Sebelius declared much of eastern and southeastern Kansas a disaster area, including Crawford County.

== Geography ==
According to the United States Census Bureau, the county has a total area of 595 square miles (1,540 km^{2}), of which 590 square miles (1,500 km^{2}) is land and 5.3 square miles (14 km^{2}) (0.9%) is water.

=== Adjacent counties ===
- Bourbon County (north)
- Vernon County, Missouri (northeast)
- Barton County, Missouri (east)
- Jasper County, Missouri (southeast)
- Cherokee County (south)
- Labette County (southwest)
- Neosho County (west)

== Demographics ==
Historical population
| Census | Pop. | Note | %± |
|---|---|---|---|
| 1870 | 8,160 | | — |
| 1880 | 16,851 | | 106.5% |
| 1890 | 30,286 | | 79.7% |
| 1900 | 38,809 | | 28.1% |
| 1910 | 51,178 | | 31.9% |
| 1920 | 61,800 | | 20.8% |
| 1930 | 49,329 | | −20.2% |
| 1940 | 44,191 | | −10.4% |
| 1950 | 40,231 | | −9.0% |
| 1960 | 37,032 | | −8.0% |
| 1970 | 37,850 | | 2.2% |
| 1980 | 37,916 | | 0.2% |
| 1990 | 35,568 | | −6.2% |
| 2000 | 38,242 | | 7.5% |
| 2010 | 39,134 | | 2.3% |
| 2020 | 38,972 | | −0.4% |
| 2025 (est.) | 39,008 | ▲ | 0.1% |
U.S. Decennial Census; 1790-1960 1900-1990; 1990-2000 2010-2020

The Pittsburg Micropolitan Statistical Area includes all of Crawford County.

=== 2020 census ===
As of the 2020 census, the county had a population of 38,972. The median age was 34.7 years. 22.6% of residents were under the age of 18 and 16.3% of residents were 65 years of age or older. For every 100 females there were 99.7 males, and for every 100 females age 18 and over there were 97.1 males age 18 and over. 59.3% of residents lived in urban areas, while 40.7% lived in rural areas.

The racial makeup of the county was 83.6% White, 2.3% Black or African American, 1.0% American Indian and Alaska Native, 1.2% Asian, 0.5% Native Hawaiian and Pacific Islander, 3.3% from some other race, and 8.1% from two or more races. Hispanic or Latino residents of any race comprised 7.0% of the population.

There were 15,668 households in the county, of which 28.1% had children under the age of 18 living with them and 27.9% had a female householder with no spouse or partner present. About 31.8% of all households were made up of individuals and 12.1% had someone living alone who was 65 years of age or older.

There were 17,997 housing units, of which 12.9% were vacant. Among occupied housing units, 58.4% were owner-occupied and 41.6% were renter-occupied. The homeowner vacancy rate was 2.2% and the rental vacancy rate was 11.2%.

=== 2000 census ===
As of the census of 2000, there were 38,242 people, 15,504 households, and 9,441 families residing in the county. The population density was 64 people per square mile (25 people/km^{2}). There were 17,221 housing units at an average density of 29 per square mile (11/km^{2}). The racial makeup of the county was 93.29% White, 1.83% Black or African American, 0.94% Native American, 1.11% Asian, 0.09% Pacific Islander, 1.11% from other races, and 1.63% from two or more races. Hispanic or Latino of any race were 2.38% of the population. 23.5% were of German, 12.5% American, 10.4% English, 10.2% Irish and 8.6% Italian ancestry.

There were 15,504 households, out of which 28.50% had children under the age of 18 living with them, 47.90% were married couples living together, 9.30% had a female householder with no husband present, and 39.10% were non-families. 30.60% of all households were made up of individuals, and 13.40% had someone living alone who was 65 years of age or older. The average household size was 2.35 and the average family size was 2.96.

In the county, the population was spread out, with 22.90% under the age of 18, 16.40% from 18 to 24, 25.00% from 25 to 44, 20.20% from 45 to 64, and 15.50% who were 65 years of age or older. The median age was 34 years. For every 100 females there were 95.00 males. For every 100 females age 18 and over, there were 92.40 males.

The median income for a household in the county was $29,409, and the median income for a family was $40,582. Males had a median income of $27,881 versus $21,517 for females. The per capita income for the county was $16,245. About 9.40% of families and 16.00% of the population were below the poverty line, including 17.00% of those under age 18 and 10.30% of those age 65 or over.

== Government ==
=== Presidential elections ===
Presidential election results

United States presidential election results for Crawford County, Kansas
| Year | Republican | | Democratic | | Third party(ies) | |
| Year | No. | % | No. | % | No. | % |
|---|---|---|---|---|---|---|
| 1888 | 3,156 | 48.46% | 1,875 | 28.79% | 1,482 | 22.75% |
| 1892 | 3,064 | 41.89% | 0 | 0.00% | 4,250 | 58.11% |
| 1896 | 3,868 | 44.40% | 4,757 | 54.60% | 87 | 1.00% |
| 1900 | 4,722 | 48.66% | 4,824 | 49.71% | 158 | 1.63% |
| 1904 | 5,910 | 58.35% | 2,057 | 20.31% | 2,162 | 21.34% |
| 1908 | 5,152 | 46.55% | 4,230 | 38.22% | 1,686 | 15.23% |
| 1912 | 2,676 | 25.16% | 2,781 | 26.14% | 5,180 | 48.70% |
| 1916 | 7,067 | 38.12% | 8,064 | 43.50% | 3,408 | 18.38% |
| 1920 | 7,957 | 54.68% | 5,362 | 36.84% | 1,234 | 8.48% |
| 1924 | 9,063 | 50.34% | 3,433 | 19.07% | 5,509 | 30.60% |
| 1928 | 10,992 | 62.31% | 6,351 | 36.00% | 299 | 1.69% |
| 1932 | 6,884 | 37.41% | 10,994 | 59.75% | 523 | 2.84% |
| 1936 | 8,596 | 39.73% | 12,974 | 59.96% | 66 | 0.31% |
| 1940 | 10,143 | 47.68% | 11,002 | 51.71% | 130 | 0.61% |
| 1944 | 9,017 | 52.09% | 8,211 | 47.43% | 83 | 0.48% |
| 1948 | 8,229 | 46.19% | 9,005 | 50.55% | 581 | 3.26% |
| 1952 | 10,646 | 55.81% | 8,349 | 43.77% | 79 | 0.41% |
| 1956 | 9,578 | 54.93% | 7,799 | 44.73% | 60 | 0.34% |
| 1960 | 9,383 | 52.78% | 8,325 | 46.83% | 69 | 0.39% |
| 1964 | 6,286 | 37.77% | 10,282 | 61.78% | 76 | 0.46% |
| 1968 | 7,344 | 45.30% | 7,191 | 44.35% | 1,678 | 10.35% |
| 1972 | 9,652 | 58.02% | 6,683 | 40.17% | 302 | 1.82% |
| 1976 | 7,225 | 43.78% | 9,021 | 54.66% | 258 | 1.56% |
| 1980 | 8,058 | 47.81% | 7,658 | 45.43% | 1,139 | 6.76% |
| 1984 | 9,518 | 58.10% | 6,722 | 41.04% | 141 | 0.86% |
| 1988 | 6,940 | 46.73% | 7,783 | 52.41% | 127 | 0.86% |
| 1992 | 5,468 | 32.96% | 7,366 | 44.40% | 3,757 | 22.64% |
| 1996 | 6,447 | 40.60% | 7,504 | 47.25% | 1,929 | 12.15% |
| 2000 | 7,160 | 47.63% | 7,076 | 47.07% | 798 | 5.31% |
| 2004 | 8,626 | 52.19% | 7,617 | 46.09% | 284 | 1.72% |
| 2008 | 7,735 | 48.12% | 7,957 | 49.50% | 383 | 2.38% |
| 2012 | 7,708 | 51.25% | 6,826 | 45.39% | 506 | 3.36% |
| 2016 | 8,624 | 57.91% | 5,199 | 34.91% | 1,068 | 7.17% |
| 2020 | 10,045 | 60.08% | 6,179 | 36.96% | 494 | 2.95% |
| 2024 | 10,084 | 61.74% | 5,956 | 36.46% | 294 | 1.80% |

Unlike most of the counties in the Ozark-Ouachita “Bible Belt”, Crawford County remained competitive in presidential elections until the 2010s. As recently as 2008 it was carried by Barack Obama, being the only county he ever won between the urban limits of Dallas, Little Rock, Denver and Kansas City. However, like all of the region it has shown a strong anti-Democratic trend in recent years, with Hillary Clinton's 34.91% – though more than she achieved in any rural white southern county – being the worst by a Democrat since 1924. Democrat Laura Kelly did, however, win the county in her successful 2018 gubernatorial bid.

In earlier times, Crawford County was a hotbed of left-wing politics, being the nation's second best county for Eugene Debs in 1912, and one of only four where he gained a plurality of votes. It was also Robert M. La Follette’s second-best Kansas county in 1924, behind only largely Catholic Ellis County.

Only four presidential elections since have seen Crawford County not back the national winner: 1960, 1988, 2012, and 2020.

=== Laws ===
Crawford County was a prohibition, or "dry", county until the Kansas Constitution was amended in 1986 and voters approved the sale of alcoholic liquor by the individual drink with a 30% food sales requirement. The food sales requirement was removed with voter approval in 1992.

The county voted "No" on the 2022 Kansas abortion referendum, an anti-abortion ballot measure, by 55% to 45% despite backing Donald Trump with 60% of the vote to Joe Biden's 38% in the 2020 presidential election.

== Education ==
=== Higher education ===
- Pittsburg State University is located in Pittsburg.

=== Unified school districts ===
School districts include:

- Northeast USD 246 - Serves the northeast portion of Crawford County, namely Lincoln and Washington Townships, including the communities of Arcadia, Arma, Cockerall, Camp 50, Franklin, Mulberry and Breezy Hill. The mascot is the Viking and the colors are burgundy and white.
- Southeast USD 247 (a.k.a. Cherokee USD 247) - Serves primarily portions of Crawford and Cherokee counties, but also includes small portions of Labette and Neosho counties. The 300-square-mile (780 km^{2}) district serves over 450 students in grades Pre-K through 12. Southeast High School (the "Lancers") is located just west of the city of Cherokee (the district office is located in the Cherokee/McCune Township). In Crawford County the district also serves the city of McCune. The mascot is the lancer and the colors are Columbia blue and white.
- Girard USD 248 - Serves Girard and the Girard Township, including the communities of Farlington, Walnut, Greenbush and Hepler. The mascot is the trojan and the colors are maroon and yellow/gold.
- Frontenac USD 249 - Serves Frontenac and the Frontenac Township, including the communities of Yale, Radley, Ringo and Mindenmines, Missouri. The mascot is the raider and the colors are black and white/silver.
- Pittsburg USD 250 - Serves Pittsburg and the Pittsburg Township, including the communities of Chicopee, Opolis, and Asbury, Missouri. The mascot is the purple dragon and the colors are purple and white.

Others with portions in the county include:

- Chetopa-St. Paul USD 505
- Erie USD 101
- Uniontown USD 235

=== Private schools ===
- Saint Mary's - Colgan (Web site) is a private Catholic K-12 school located in Pittsburg. The mascot is the panther and the colors are blue and white.

=== Libraries ===
- Pittsburg Public Library
- Girard Public Library
- Frontenac Public Library

== Communities ==
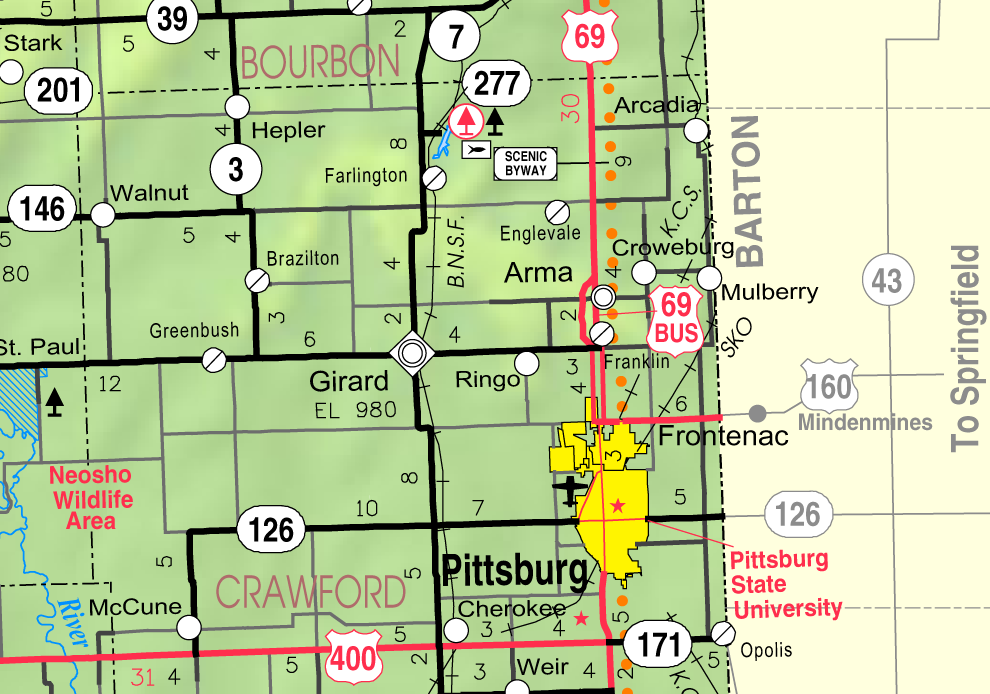
2005 map of Crawford County (map legend)

List of townships / incorporated cities / unincorporated communities / extinct former communities within Crawford County.

=== Cities ===
- Arcadia
- Arma
- Cherokee
- Frontenac
- Girard (county seat)
- Hepler
- McCune
- Mulberry
- Pittsburg
- Walnut

=== Unincorporated places ===
‡ means a community has portions in an adjacent county. † means a community is designated a Census-Designated Place (CDP) by the United States Census Bureau.

- Beulah
- Brazilton
- Capaldo
- Cato
- Chicopee†
- Coalvale
- Croweburg†
- Curranville
- Dry Wood
- Dunkirk
- Englevale
- Farlington†
- Fleming
- Franklin†
- Fuller
- Greenbush
- Gross
- Kirkwood
- Klondike
- Kniveton‡
- Litchfield
- Lone Oak
- Midway
- Monmouth
- Opolis†
- Polk
- Radley†
- Red Onion
- Ringo†
- South Radley
- Yale†

=== Townships ===
Crawford County is divided into nine townships. The cities of Frontenac, Girard, Mulberry, and Pittsburg are considered governmentally independent and are excluded from the census figures for the townships. In the following table, the population center is the largest city (or cities) included in that township's population total, if it is of a significant size.

| Township | FIPS | Population center | Population | Population density /km^{2} (/sq mi) | Land area km^{2} (sq mi) | Water area km^{2} (sq mi) | Water % | Geographic coordinates |
|---|---|---|---|---|---|---|---|---|
| Baker | 03750 | Pittsburg | 3,640 | 25 (64) | 147 (57) | 0 (0) | 0.05% | 37°22′57″N 94°42′35″W |
| Crawford | 16250 | Girard | 883 | 6 (14) | 159 (62) | 0 (0) | 0.09% | 37°30′3″N 94°51′13″W |
| Grant | 27575 | | 247 | 2 (4) | 145 (56) | 1 (0) | 0.45% | 37°30′10″N 95°1′8″W |
| Lincoln | 40575 | Arcadia | 942 | 5 (13) | 181 (70) | 0 (0) | 0.23% | 37°37′21″N 94°39′31″W |
| Osage | 53125 | McCune | 756 | 5 (14) | 141 (54) | 1 (0) | 0.44% | 37°22′46″N 95°1′21″W |
| Sheridan | 64675 | Cherokee | 1,501 | 7 (19) | 206 (80) | 1 (0) | 0.31% | 37°22′32″N 94°51′33″W |
| Sherman | 64875 | Farlington | 520 | 3 (7) | 187 (72) | 1 (0) | 0.45% | 37°37′24″N 94°51′35″W |
| Walnut | 74975 | Walnut | 624 | 4 (10) | 166 (64) | 0 (0) | 0.27% | 37°36′15″N 95°1′38″W |
| Washington | 75575 | Frontenac | 3,540 | 23 (59) | 154 (60) | 1 (1) | 0.96% | 37°31′7″N 94°41′44″W |
Sources: "Census 2000 U.S. Gazetteer Files". U.S. Census Bureau, Geography Division. Archived from the original on August 2, 2002.

== See also ==
- Mined Land Wildlife Area
- National Register of Historic Places listings in Crawford County, Kansas

Community information for Kansas

- Kansas locations by per capita income
- List of counties in Kansas
- List of townships in Kansas
- List of cities in Kansas
- List of unincorporated communities in Kansas
- List of ghost towns in Kansas
