= Grant Township, Crawford County, Kansas =

Grant Township
- Township
- Location in Crawford County
- Coordinates: 37°31′25″N 095°02′21″W
- Country: United States
- State: Kansas
- County: Crawford

Area
  - Total: 56.22 sq mi (145.62 km^{2})
  - Land: 55.97 sq mi (144.96 km^{2})
  - Water: 0.25 sq mi (0.65 km^{2}) 0.45%
- Elevation: 965 ft (294 m)

Population (2020)
  - Total: 233
  - Density: 4.16/sq mi (1.61/km^{2})
- GNIS feature ID: 0469711

Grant Township is a township in Crawford County, Kansas, United States. As of the 2010 census, its population was 233.

== Geography ==
Grant Township covers an area of 56.22 square miles (145.6 km^{2}) and contains no incorporated settlements. According to the USGS, it contains two cemeteries: Mills and Spangler.
