= Colfax =

Colfax may refer to:

== People ==
- Ellen Maria Colfax (1836–1911), second wife of Schuyler Colfax
- Evelyn Clark Colfax (1823–1863), first wife of Schuyler Colfax
- Schuyler Colfax (1823–1885), politician and 17th vice president of the United States
- Schuyler Colfax III (1870–1925), American politician, 11th mayor of South Bend, Illinois, and son of the Schuyler Colfax
- William Colfax (1756–1838), American Revolutionary War officer

== Places ==
- Colfax, Saskatchewan, Canada, an unincorporated community

=== United States ===
- Colfax, California, a city
- Colfax, Colorado, a ghost town
- Colfax, Illinois, a village
- Colfax, Indiana, a town
- Colfax, Iowa, a city
- Colfax, Louisiana, a town
- Colfax, North Carolina, an unincorporated community
- Colfax, North Dakota, a city
- Colfax, Ohio, an unincorporated community
- Colfax, Texas, an unincorporated populated place
- Colfax, Washington, a city
- Colfax, West Virginia, an unincorporated community
- Colfax, Wisconsin, a village
- Colfax (town), Wisconsin
- Colfax County, Nebraska
- Colfax County, New Mexico
- Colfax Township (disambiguation)
- Mount Colfax, New York
- Colfax Peak, a summit near Lincoln Peak in Washington State
- Camp Colfax, a post in the military district of Oregon

== Transportation ==
- Colfax Avenue, a major east–west thoroughfare in Denver, Colorado
- Colfax station, Colfax, California, an Amtrak train station
- Colfax station (RTD), Aurora, Colorado, a light rail station
- Colfax Airport, Colfax, Louisiana

== Other uses ==
- USRC Colfax (1871), a U.S. Revenue Cutter Service cutter; see USRC Boutwell (1873)
- Colfax High School (disambiguation)
- Colfax Elementary School, Pittsburgh, Pennsylvania, on the National Register of Historic Places
- Colfax (beetle), a genus of beetles in the family Carabidae
- Colfax Corporation, an American company now known as Enovis
- AMD Colfax, CPUs of the Zen+ Threadripper line by Advanced Micro Devices
- Colfax Theater, a theater building in South Bend, Indiana, on the National Register of Historic Places
- Colfax Marathon, an annual race run in Colorado, United States

== See also ==
- Colefax Group
