= Canville Township, Kansas =

Township in Neosho County, Kansas, U.S.

Canville Township
- Township
- Location within Neosho County
- Coordinates: 37.61°N 95.46°W
- Country: United States
- State: Kansas
- County: Neosho

Area
  - Total: 47.461 sq mi (122.92 km^{2})
  - Land: 47.308 sq mi (122.53 km^{2})
  - Water: 0.153 sq mi (0.40 km^{2}) 0.32%

Population (2020)
  - Total: 551
  - Density: 11.6/sq mi (4.50/km^{2})
- Time zone: UTC-6 (CST)
  - Summer (DST): UTC-5 (CDT)
- Area code: 620

Canville Township is a township in Neosho County, Kansas, United States.

A. B. Canville was a pioneer who settled in 1847 on Canville Creek.

== Geography ==
Canville Township covers an area of 47.461 square miles (122.92 square kilometers). The Neosho River flows through it.

=== Communities ===
- Earlton
- part of Urbana

=== Adjacent townships ===
- Tioga Township, Neosho County (north)
- Big Creek Township, Neosho County (northeast)
- Erie Township, Neosho County (east)
- Centerville Township, Neosho County (southeast)
- Chetopa Township, Neosho County (south)
- Chetopa Township, Wilson County (southwest)
- Pleasant Valley Township, Wilson County (west)
- Colfax Township, Wilson County (northwest)

=== Major highways ===
- US-169
