= Chetopa Township, Neosho County, Kansas =

Township in Neosho County, Kansas, U.S.

Chetopa Township
- Township
- Location within Neosho County
- Coordinates: 37.517293°N 95.461007°W
- Country: United States
- State: Kansas
- County: Neosho

Area
  - Total: 48.161 sq mi (124.74 km^{2})
  - Land: 47.995 sq mi (124.31 km^{2})
  - Water: 0.166 sq mi (0.43 km^{2}) 0.34%

Population (2020)
  - Total: 845
  - Density: 17.6/sq mi (6.80/km^{2})
- Time zone: UTC-6 (CST)
  - Summer (DST): UTC-5 (CDT)
- Area code: 620

Chetopa Township is a township in Neosho County, Kansas, United States. As of the 2020 census, its population was 845.

== Geography ==
Chetopa Township covers an area of 48.161 square miles (124.74 square kilometers).

=== Communities ===
- Thayer
- part of Urbana

=== Adjacent townships ===
- Canville Township, Neosho County (north)
- Erie Township, Neosho County (northeast)
- Centerville Township, Neosho County (east)
- Ladore Township, Neosho County (southeast)
- Shiloh Township, Neosho County (south)
- Newark Township, Wilson County (southwest)
- Chetopa Township, Wilson County (west)
- Pleasant Valley Township, Wilson County (northwest)

=== Major highways ===
- US-169
- K-47
