= Colfax Township, Kansas =

Colfax Township, Kansas may refer to:

- Colfax Township, Cloud County, Kansas
- Colfax Township, Marion County, Kansas
- Colfax Township, Wilson County, Kansas

== See also ==
- List of Kansas townships
- Colfax Township (disambiguation)
