= U.S. Route 69 in Kansas =

Segment of American highway

U.S. Highway 69
- US 69 highlighted in red

Route information
- Maintained by KDOT
- Length: 163 mi (262 km)
- Existed: 1935–present

Major junctions
- South end: US 69 at the Oklahoma state line in Picher, OK
- US-166 in Baxter Springs; US-400 north of Baxter Springs; US-54 in Fort Scott; I-435 / US-50 in Overland Park; I-35 / US-56 / US-169 in Lenexa; I-635 in Kansas City; I-70 / US-24 / US-40 in Kansas City
- North end: US 69 at the Missouri state line in Kansas City

Location
- Country: United States
- State: Kansas
- Counties: Cherokee, Crawford, Bourbon, Linn, Miami, Johnson, Wyandotte

Highway system
- United States Numbered Highway System; List; Special; Divided; Kansas State Highway System; Interstate; US; State; Spurs
← K-68	→ I-70

U.S. Route 69 (US-69) is a major north-south U.S. Highway that runs from Port Arthur, Texas to Albert Lea, Minnesota. In Kansas, the highway runs in the far eastern part of the state, usually within five miles of the Missouri state line. Most of the highway north of Fort Scott runs as a freeway.

== Route description ==
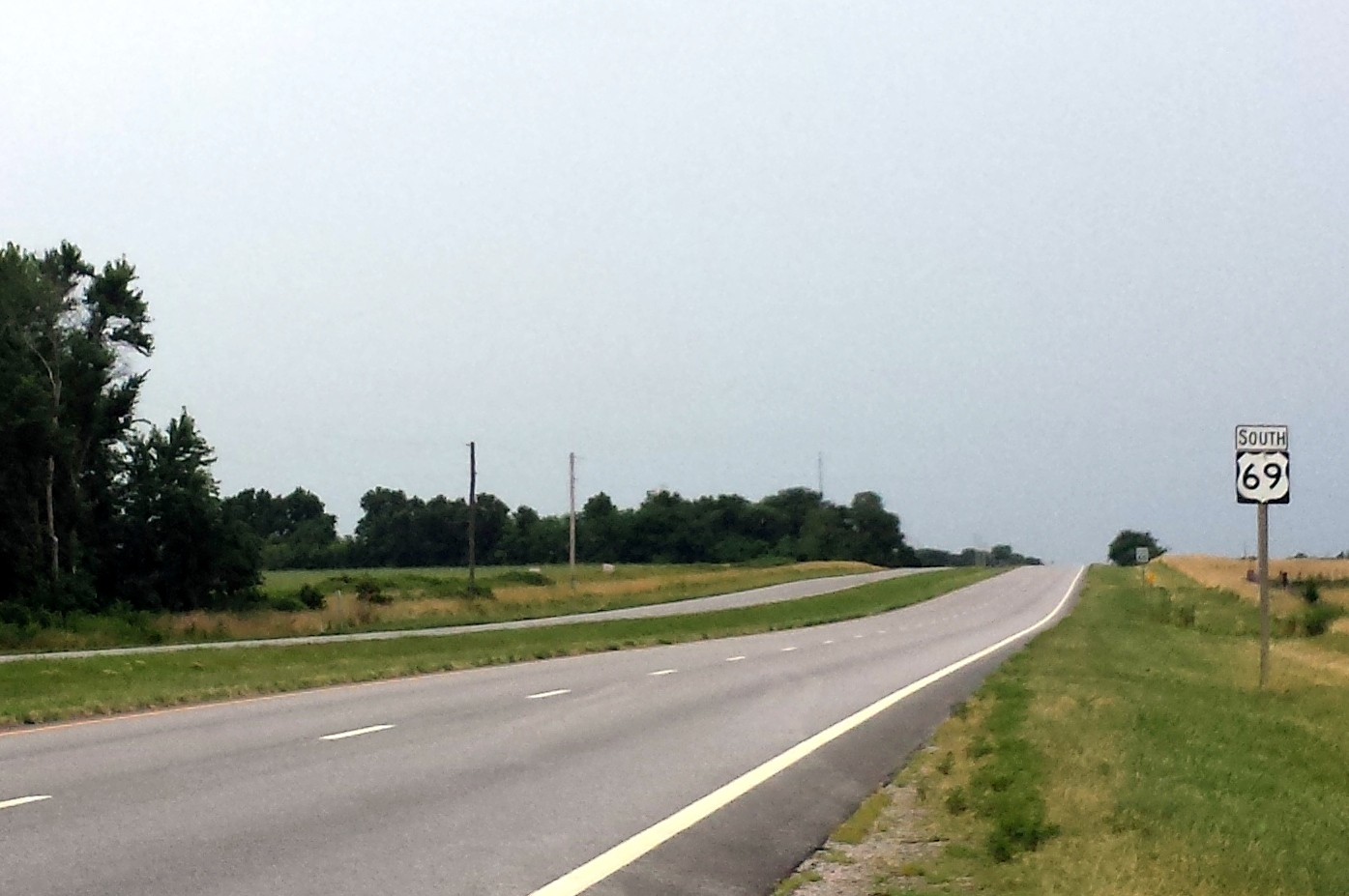
US 69 south of Franklin, KS

US-69 enters Kansas just north of Miami, Oklahoma as a concurrency with the southern terminus of K-7. The highway crosses US-166 west of Treece before K-7 leaves the concurrency with the intersection of US-160 in Columbus, of which U.S. 160 begins another overlap with U.S. 69. The two routes head east for 7 miles (10 km) before US-400 joins the overlap in Crestline and head north, before U.S. 400 leaves the highway south of Pittsburg. As the two highways leave Pittsburg, the route becomes a short 4-lane expressway before US-160 leaves the highway as it exits Frontenac. Just after US-69 meets the eastern terminus with K-47 in Franklin, the route reverts back to a 2-lane highway before entering the town of Arma. US-69 then becomes a 4-lane expressway near Garland. US-69 meets with K-7 for a second time as a partial interchange and the two routes continue north to Fort Scott. As the undivided freeway begins, U.S. Route 54 joins the overlap for 1/2 mile (0.8 km); both US-54 and K-7 leaves the overlap just north of the city limits as US-69 continues north as a divided freeway. The freeway runs through the towns of Pleasanton and Trading Post, as well as more rural areas before entering the Kansas City metropolitan area at Overland Park.

In Overland Park, US-69 interchanges with Interstate 435/US-50 before beginning an overlap with I-35/US-169/US-56 in Lenexa. US-69 and US-56 leave I-35 in Merriam, traveling back into Overland Park. US-56 leaves the highway, running into KCM. US-69 rejoins I-35 again at an interchange with I-635. US-69 leaves I-35 again and runs along the 18th Street Expressway to I-70/US-40 in KCK. US-69 joins I-70/US-40 and leaves again at an interchange with I-670/US-169. US-69 enters Missouri just past the intersection with K-5, crossing the Missouri River.

== History ==
=== 18th Street Expressway ===
The 18th Street Expressway was the result of one of four feasibility studies conducted by the Kansas Turnpike Authority to extend the turnpike by providing easy access to northeast Johnson County. It was the only one of the four studies to be followed upon, with completion of the 18th Street Expressway Bridge over the Kansas River completed in 1959. It replaced the Argentine Boulevard bridge over the river behind the modern-day BNSF railroad yard.

Originally, the highway was part of the original K-58. Upon completion of the bridge, US-69 was rerouted onto the expressway from Southwest Boulevard (the section of which has since been renamed to Merriam Drive). In 1979, the K-58 designation was removed.

The section of 18th Street between I-70 and the southern end of the Kansas River bridge was tolled at least as late as 1984.

=== Reconstruction ===
In early April 2020, a $21.8 million construction project to finish a four-lane expressway from Pittsburg to Kansas City began. The project will expand a six miles (9.7 km) section of US-69 in Crawford County to a four-lane divided expressway, from the K-47 junction north to three miles (4.8 km) north of Arma. The project will be completed by Koss Construction Company of Topeka and will be completed by August 2021.

=== Overland Park toll lanes ===
As Overland Park has grown in recent years, US-69 south of 103rd Street has become the busiest four-lane highway in Kansas. On June 21, 2021, the Overland Park city council approved a toll lane to be added to both directions of US-69 between 103rd Street and 151st Street. Since then, the Kansas Turnpike Authority and the State Finance Council have also approved the project, which was required by a new Kansas law that allows toll lanes to pay for road expansion.

== Junction list ==
County	Location	mi	km	Exit	Destinations	Notes
Kansas–Oklahoma line		0.000	0.000		US 69 south / Treece Road east / 10 Road west K-7 begins	Southern end of K-7 overlap; continuation into Oklahoma
Cherokee	Lyon–Spring Valley township line	2.234	3.595		US-166 – Chetopa, Baxter Springs	
Cherokee	Columbus	12.381	19.925		US-160 west / K-7 north – Oswego, Girard	Southern end of US 160 overlap; northern end of K-7 overlap
Cherokee	Shawnee Township	19.402	31.224		US-400 east / US 69 Alt. south – Joplin, Miami	Southern end of US 400 overlap; northern terminus of US-69 Alternate
Cherokee	Pleasant View Township	28.520	45.898		K-103 west – Weir	Eastern terminus of K-103
Cherokee–Crawford county line	Pleasant View–Baker township line	30.487	49.064		US-400 west / K-171 east – Parsons, Joplin	Northern end of US 400 overlap; western terminus of K-171
Crawford	Pittsburg	33.513	53.934		US 69 Bus. north – Pittsburg	Southern terminus of US-69 Bus.
Crawford	Pittsburg	35.838	57.676		K-126 – McCune, Pittsburg	
Crawford	Pittsburg	38.167	61.424		US 69 Bus. south – Pittsburg	Northern terminus of US-69 Bus.
Crawford	Pittsburg	40.177	64.659		US-160 east – Lamar	Northern end of US 160 overlap
Crawford	Franklin	43.213	69.545		K-47 west / US 69 Bus. north – Girard, Arma, Mulberry	Eastern terminus of K-47; southern terminus of US-69 Bus.
Crawford	Washington Township	46.209	74.366		US 69 Bus. south (Highway A)	Northern terminus of US-69 Bus.
Bourbon	Scott Township	61.325	98.693		K-7 south – Girard	Interchange; southern end of K-7 overlap
Bourbon	Fort Scott	66.148	106.455	—	US-54 east – Nevada	Southern end of freeway; southern end of US 54 overlap
Bourbon	Scott Township	67.048	107.903	—	US-54 west / K-7 north – Iola, Harding	Northern end of US 54/K-7 overlap
Bourbon	Scott Township	69.628	112.055	—	Poplar Road	Diamond interchange
Bourbon	Osage Township	72.666	116.945	—	Soldier Road	Diamond interchange
Bourbon	Osage Township	76.719	123.467	—	K-31 west – Harding	Eastern terminus of K-31; diamond interchange
Linn	Sheridan Township			—	K-239 – Prescott	Diamond interchange
Linn	Potosi Township			—	K-52 west – Mound City	Southern end of K-52 overlap; diamond interchange
Linn	Potosi Township			—	E. 1100 Road – Pleasanton	Diamond interchange
Linn	Potosi Township			—	E. 1350 Road	Diamond interchange
Linn	Valley Township			—	K-52 east – Butler	Northern end of K-52 overlap; diamond interchange
Linn	Lincoln Township			—	K-152 – La Cygne	Diamond interchange
Miami	Sugar Creek Township			—	W. 399th Street	Partial cloverleaf interchange
Miami	Sugar Creek Township			—	W. 359th Street	Diamond interchange
Miami	Sugar Creek–Middle Creek township line			—	W. 335th Street	Diamond interchange
Miami	Middle Creek Township			—	W. 311th Street	Diamond interchange
Miami	Louisburg			—	K-68 – Ottawa, Louisburg	Diamond interchange
Miami	Wea Township			—	W. 247th Street	Diamond interchange
Miami	Wea Township			—	W. 223rd Street	Diamond interchange
Johnson	Overland Park			—	199th Street	Diamond interchange
Johnson	Overland Park			—	179th Street	Diamond interchange
Johnson	Overland Park			—	167th Street	Dogbone or Roundabout Diamond interchange
Johnson	Overland Park			—	159th Street	Diamond interchange
Johnson	Overland Park			—	151st Street	Diamond interchange
Johnson	Overland Park			—	US-69 Express Lanes north	opened in 2026; south end of Express Lanes
Johnson	Overland Park			—	135th Street	Partial cloverleaf interchange
Johnson	Overland Park			—	Blue Valley Parkway	opened in 2026; Northbound exit and southbound entrance; to become Express Lane only interchange
Johnson	Overland Park			—	135th Street	opened in 2026; Express Lane interchange; southbound exit only
Johnson	Overland Park			—	119th Street	Diamond interchange
Johnson	Overland Park			—	College Boulevard	Partial cloverleaf interchange
Johnson	Overland Park			—	I-435 / US-50	I-435 exit 81; partial cloverleaf interchange; split into two exits (east/west) northbound
Johnson	Overland Park			—	US-69 Express Lanes south	opened in 2026; north end of Express Lanes
Johnson	Overland Park			—	103rd Street	Partial cloverleaf interchange; southbound access is part of I-435 exit
Johnson	Overland Park			—	95th Street	Diamond interchange
Johnson	Lenexa			—	87th Street Parkway	No northbound entrance
Johnson	Lenexa			—	75th Street	Northbound exit only
Johnson	Lenexa			—	I-35 south (US-56 west / US-169 south)	Southern end of I-35/US-56/US-169 overlap; southbound left exit and northbound left entrance; I-35 exit 225B
Johnson	Overland Park–Merriam line			227	75th Street	Exit numbers follow I-35; no northbound exit
Johnson	Merriam			228A	67th Street	
Johnson	Merriam				I-35 north	North end of freeway section; northern end of I-35 overlap; I-35 exit 228B
Johnson	Overland Park–Mission line				US-56 east / US-169 north (Shawnee Mission Parkway east) / Metcalf Avenue south	Cloverleaf interchange; northern end of US-56/US-169 overlap
Johnson	Overland Park–Mission line				Metcalf Lane	Partial cloverleaf interchange; southbound exit and entrance
Johnson	Overland Park–Mission line				Johnson Drive	Right-in/right-out interchange; southbound exit and entrance
Johnson	Overland Park–Mission line				58th Street	Right-in/right-out interchange; northbound exit and entrance
Johnson	Overland Park–Mission line			231A	I-635 north / I-35 south	South end of freeway section; exit number is to I-635, no exit number northbound; southern end of I-35 overlap; I-35 exit 231B; I-635 exit 1A
Johnson–Wyandotte county line	Mission–Kansas City line			232A	Lamar Avenue	
Wyandotte	Kansas City				I-35 north – Des Moines	North end of freeway section; northern end of I-35 overlap; I-35 exit 232B
Wyandotte	Kansas City			South end of 18th Street Expressway		
Wyandotte	Kansas City			—	Merriam Lane	Southbound exit and northbound entrance
Wyandotte	Kansas City			—	Steele Road	
Wyandotte	Kansas City			—	Metropolitan Avenue / Ruby Avenue	Trucks prohibited
Wyandotte	Kansas City			—	K-32 west (Kansas Avenue)	Eastern terminus of K-32
Wyandotte	Kansas City			420B	18th Street north I-70 west / US-24 west / US-40 west – Topeka	North end of 18th Street Expressway; southern end of I-70/US-24/US-40 overlap; exit numbers follow I-70; exit number is to 18th St. north, no exit number northbound; I-70 exit 420A
Wyandotte	Kansas City			421A	RR Yard (No outlet)	Railroad use only; southbound exit and northbound entrance
Wyandotte	Kansas City			421B	I-670 east	Northbound left exit and southbound entrance
Wyandotte	Kansas City				I-70 east (US-24 / US-40 east) / US-169	North end of freeway section; northern end of I-70 overlap; I-70 exit 422A
Wyandotte	Kansas City				Sunshine Road (K-5 west)	Eastern terminus of K-5
Missouri River		163	262		US 69 Missouri River Bridge; Kansas–Missouri line	
Missouri River		163	262		US 69 north	Continuation into Missouri
1.000 mi = 1.609 km; 1.000 km = 0.621 mi: Concurrency terminus; Proposed; Incomplete access

== Special routes ==
=== Alternate route ===
U.S. Route 69 Alternate
- Location: Ottawa County, Oklahoma– Cherokee County, Kansas
- Length: 20.3 mi (32.7 km)

U.S. Route 69 Alternate (US-69 Alt.) is a special route of U.S. Highway 69, traveling 20.3 miles (32.7 km) between junctions east of Commerce, Oklahoma and north of Crestline, Kansas.

US-69 Alt., cosigned with Historic Route 66, splits from mainline US 69 south of Picher and west of Quapaw. US-69 Alt. and HR-66 head ENE through the towns of Quapaw and Baxter Springs, Kansas. North of Baxter Springs, US 400 joins the concurrency. West of Riverton, HR-66 heads east along K-66, while US-69 Alt. and US 400 head north. North of Crestline, US-69 Alt. and US 400 meet US 69 and US 160 from the west. US-69 Alt. terminates as US 69 and US 160 merge with US 400. The concurrency of US 69, US 400, and US 160 continues north.

=== Pittsburg Business loop ===
U.S. Highway 69 Business
- Location: Pittsburg

U.S. Route 69 Business (US 69 Business) is a business route of US 69 running through Pittsburg. Its southern terminus is at US-69 and its northern terminus is at US-69.

Major Intersections

The entire route is in Pittsburg, Crawford County.

mi	km	Destinations	Notes
0.00	0.00	US-69 / US-160	Southern terminus
		K-126 (4th Street)	
		US-69 / US-160 (West Atkinson Road / Parkview Drive)	Northern terminus
1.000 mi = 1.609 km; 1.000 km = 0.621 mi

=== Arma business loop ===
U.S. Highway 69 Business
- Location: Arma

U.S. Route 69 Business (US-69 Business) is a business route of US-69 running through Arma. Its southern terminus is at US-69 and K-47 and its northern terminus is at US-69.

Major Intersections

The entire route is in Crawford County.

Location	mi	km	Destinations	Notes
Franklin	0.00	0.00	K-47 west US-69	Southern terminus; eastern terminus of K-47; highway continues west as K-47
Washington Township			US-69 – Fort Scott, Pittsburg	Northern terminus
1.000 mi = 1.609 km; 1.000 km = 0.621 mi: Route transition

U.S. Route 69
Previous state: Oklahoma	Kansas	Next state: Missouri
