= Shiloh Township, Kansas =

Township in Neosho County, Kansas, U.S.

Shiloh Township
- Township
- Location within Neosho County
- Coordinates: 37.428°N 95.452°W
- Country: United States
- State: Kansas
- County: Neosho
- Established: 1870

Area
  - Total: 48.436 sq mi (125.45 km^{2})
  - Land: 48.352 sq mi (125.23 km^{2})
  - Water: 0.084 sq mi (0.22 km^{2}) 0.17%

Population (2020)
  - Total: 537
  - Density: 11.1/sq mi (4.29/km^{2})
- Time zone: UTC-6 (CST)
  - Summer (DST): UTC-5 (CDT)
- Area code: 620

Shiloh Township is a township in Neosho County, Kansas, United States.

== History ==
Shiloh Township was organized in 1870.

== Geography ==
Shiloh Township covers an area of 48.436 square miles (125.45 square kilometers).

=== Communities ===
- Morehead

=== Adjacent townships ===
- Chetopa Township, Neosho County (north)
- Centerville Township, Neosho County (northeast)
- Ladore Township, Neosho County (east)
- Osage Township, Labette County (south)
- Cherry Township, Montgomery County (southwest)
- Newark Township, Wilson County (west)
- Chetopa Township, Wilson County (northwest)

=== Major highways ===
- US-169
