= Tioga Township, Kansas =

Township in Neosho County, Kansas, U.S.

Tioga Township
- Township
- Location within Neosho County
- Coordinates: 37.720847°N 95.418491°W
- Country: United States
- State: Kansas
- County: Neosho

Area
  - Total: 41.973 sq mi (108.71 km^{2})
  - Land: 41.29 sq mi (106.9 km^{2})
  - Water: 0.683 sq mi (1.77 km^{2}) 1.63%

Population (2020)
  - Total: 837
  - Density: 20.3/sq mi (7.83/km^{2})
- Time zone: UTC-6 (CST)
  - Summer (DST): UTC-5 (CDT)
- Area code: 620

Tioga Township is a township in Neosho County, Kansas, United States. As of the 2020 census, its population was 837.

== Geography ==
Tioga Township covers an area of 41.973 square miles (108.71 square kilometers). The Neosho River flows through it.

=== Adjacent townships ===
- Logan Township, Allen County (north)
- Cottage Grove Township, Allen County (northeast)
- Big Creek Township, Neosho County (east)
- Erie Township, Neosho County (southeast)
- Canville Township, Neosho County (south)
- Pleasant Valley Township, Wilson County (southwest)
- Colfax Township, Wilson County (west)
- Perry Township, Woodson County (northwest)

=== Major highways ===
- US-169
- K-39
