= Colfax Township, Michigan =

Colfax Township is the name of some places in the U.S. state of Michigan:

- Colfax Township, Benzie County, Michigan
- Colfax Township, Huron County, Michigan
- Colfax Township, Mecosta County, Michigan
- Colfax Township, Oceana County, Michigan
- Colfax Township, Wexford County, Michigan

== See also ==
- Colfax Township (disambiguation)
