= KS-5 =

KS5 or KS-5 may refer to:

- Kansas's 5th congressional district (1885–1993), United States
- K-5 (Kansas highway), an American road from Leavenworth to Kansas City
- Key Stage 5, education for British students aged 16–18
