= Washington Township, Crawford County, Kansas =

Washington Township
- Township
- Location in Crawford County
- Coordinates: 37°31′09″N 094°41′21″W
- Country: United States
- State: Kansas
- County: Crawford

Area
  - Total: 60.20 sq mi (155.92 km^{2})
  - Land: 59.63 sq mi (154.43 km^{2})
  - Water: 0.58 sq mi (1.49 km^{2}) 0.96%
- Elevation: 961 ft (293 m)

Population (2020)
  - Total: 3,519
  - Density: 59.02/sq mi (22.79/km^{2})
- GNIS feature ID: 0469733

Washington Township is a township in Crawford County, Kansas, United States. As of the 2020 census, its population was 3,519.

== Geography ==
Washington Township covers an area of 60.2 square miles (156 km^{2}) and contains two incorporated settlements, Arma, and the larger Frontenac. According to the USGS, it contains five cemeteries: Frontenac City Cemetery located within the City of Frontenac; Sacred Heart Catholic Cemetery, also located within the Frontenac city limits; Garden of Memories, located three miles north of Frontenac on US 69 Hwy; Lone Star, Rosebank, Smilie and Union Center all located in rural areas.

== Transportation ==
Washington Township contains two airports or landing strips: Galichia Airport and Youvan Airport.
