= West Cherry Township, Kansas =

Township in Montgomery County, Kansas, U.S.

West Cherry Township
- Township
- Location within Montgomery County
- Coordinates: 37.308398°N 95.648385°W
- Country: United States
- State: Kansas
- County: Montgomery

Area
  - Total: 39.622 sq mi (102.62 km^{2})
  - Land: 39.302 sq mi (101.79 km^{2})
  - Water: 0.32 sq mi (0.83 km^{2}) 0.81%

Population (2020)
  - Total: 285
  - Density: 7.25/sq mi (2.80/km^{2})
- Time zone: UTC-6 (CST)
  - Summer (DST): UTC-5 (CDT)
- Area code: 620

West Cherry Township is a township in Montgomery County, Kansas, United States. As of the 2020 census, its population was 285.

== Geography ==
West Cherry Township covers an area of 39.622 square miles (102.62 square kilometers). The Verdigris River flows through it.

=== Adjacent townships ===
- Newark Township, Wilson County (northeast)
- Cherry Township, Montgomery County (east)
- Drum Creek Township, Montgomery County (south)
- Sycamore Township, Montgomery County (west)
- Neodesha Township, Wilson County (northwest)

=== Major highways ===
- US-400
