= K-47 (Kansas highway) =

State highway in Kansas, U.S.

K-47
- K-47 highlighted in red

Route information
- Maintained by KDOT and the city of Girard
- Length: 61.556 mi (99.065 km)
- Existed: 1928–present

Major junctions
- West end: North 20th Street in Fredonia
- US-400 by Fredonia; US-75 in Altoona; US-59 south of Erie; K-7 in Girard
- East end: US-69 in Franklin

Location
- Country: United States
- State: Kansas
- Counties: Wilson, Neosho, Crawford

Highway system
- Kansas State Highway System; Interstate; US; State; Spurs
← K-46	→ K-48

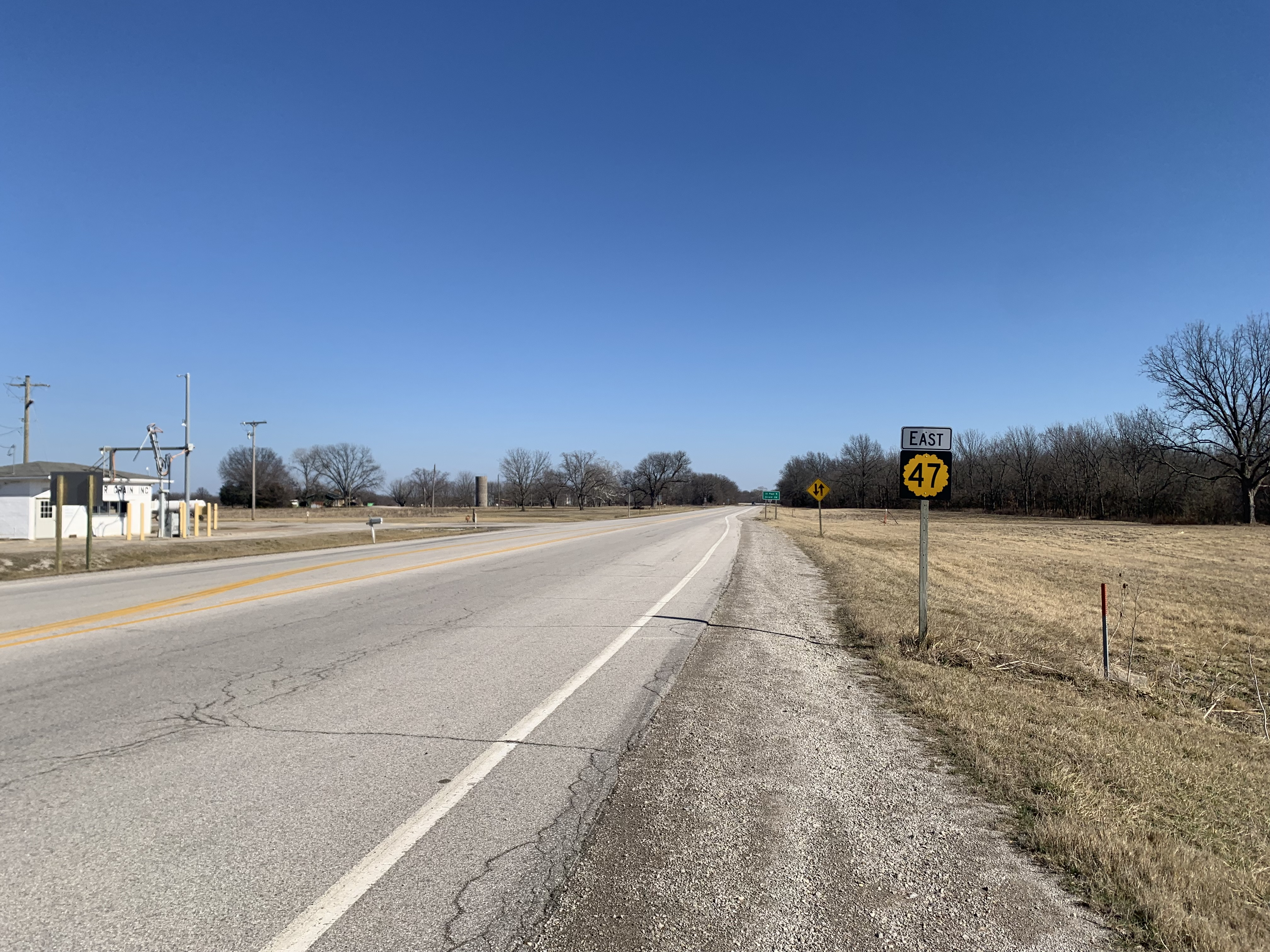
Kansas Highway 47 at junction with US 59, facing east

K-47 is an approximately 61.6-mile-long (99.1 km) state highway in the U.S. state of Kansas. It is an east-west route, and connects small towns and cities in southeast Kansas. K-47's western terminus is at the Fredonia city limits, just west of the intersection with U.S. Route 400 (US-400). The eastern terminus is US-69 in Franklin. Along the way, it intersects several major highways including US-75 in Altoona, US-59 south of Erie, and K-7 in Girard. With the exception of the cities K-47 passes through, the highway travels through rural farmland.

K-47 was established as a state highway in 1928, to a highway that ran from Fredonia northeast to Buffalo. By 1929, it was extended east from Fredonia, through Altoona to modern day US-169 south of Chanute. By 1930, K-47 was truncated to end by Fredonia, with the former section between there and Benedict becoming a realignment of K-39. In 1937, K-47 was extended from Fredonia in a northwest direction, along the former alignment of K-96, through New Albany to new K-96. K-47 was extended east to US-59 south of Erie by 1950. In 1953, K-47's western terminus was truncated back to Fredonia. In 2003, K-47 was extended east over the former K-57 to US-69 by Franklin.

== Route description ==
The Kansas Department of Transportation (KDOT) tracks the traffic levels on its highways, and in 2018, they determined that on average the traffic varied from 1,380 vehicles per day slightly west of the junction with US-75 to 4,360 vehicles per day along the overlap with US-59. The second highest was 3,890 vehicles per day slightly west of the junction with US-69. K-47 is not included in the National Highway System, (Note: The National Highway System is a system of highways important to the nation's defense, economy, and mobility.) but does connect to the National Highway System at its junction with US-400 east of Fredonia, US-75 in Altoona, US-169 north of Thayer and its eastern terminus at US-69 in Franklin. All but one mile (1.6 km) of K-47's alignment is maintained by KDOT. The section of K-47 within Girard is maintained by the city.

=== Wilson County ===
K-47's western terminus is at a continuation as Washington Avenue at the Fredonia city limits. It continues east then meets US-400 at a roundabout intersection east of the city. K-47 then continues east through flat farmland for about 1.1 miles (1.8 km) then crosses an unnamed creek by the junction of Kingman Road. The highway continues east for two miles (3.2 km) then intersects Clear Creek Road. The roadway continues through flat lands with a few houses for two miles (3.2 km) then intersects Million Dollar Highway. K-47 continues east for about 1/4 mile (0.40 km) then curves slightly southeast as it enters a forested area. After about 1/2 mile (0.80 km) the highway begins to curve northeast. The landscape surrounding the highway soon opens up to farmland as the highway resumes a direct east course. K-47 then crosses the Verdigris River roughly .2 miles (0.32 km) later. The highway continues east for 1/2 mile (0.80 km) then expands to four-lanes and enters Altoona as 13th Street. The highway proceeds east through the city for 1/4 mile (0.40 km) then has an at-grade crossing with a Union Pacific Railroad track. K-47 then intersects US-75 Business 390 feet (0.12 km) later. The highway continues for 365 feet (0.111 km) to Adams Street and downgrades to two-lanes. The roadway continues east for a short distance and intersects US-75 at a four-way stop. K-47 then exits the city and crosses Little Cedar Creek approximately .1 miles (0.16 km). The highway continues east through flat farmlands with scattered areas of trees for 1.1 miles (1.8 km) then intersects Scott Road. The roadway continues for roughly .55 miles (0.89 km) then crosses Big Cedar Creek. K-47 continues east through flat lands for 3.45 miles (5.55 km) then intersects Wichita Road. The highway then crosses over Chetopa Creek about 1.65 miles (2.66 km) later. The roadway continues east for .3 miles (0.48 km) then enters into Neosho County.

=== Neosho County ===
The highway continues east through flat farmlands for three miles (4.8 km) until it meets US-169 south of Chanute. K-47 then has an at-grade crossing with a Kansas and Oklahoma Railroad track then crosses over Elk Creek .4 miles (0.64 km) later. The highway continues for about 3.2 miles (5.1 km) through flat mostly open land then crosses Little Elk Creek. The roadway proceeds another 2.4 miles (3.9 km) and intersects Jackson Road, which travels south to Galesurg. K-47 travels another roughly one mile (1.6 km) where it crosses Rock Creek. The roadway continues through flat farmlands for approximately four miles (6.4 km) and intersects US-59 southwest of Erie. K-47 turns south and begins to overlap US-59 for .9 miles (1.4 km) then turns east and leaves US-59. The highway soon crosses Ogeese Creek the crosses over a Union Pacific Railroad track .75 miles (1.21 km) later. K-47 soon intersects Queens Road then curves slightly southeast and begins to parallel the Neosho River. The highway then crosses the river and curves back east. K-47 enters St. Paul about one mile (1.6 km) later as Washington Street. The highway crosses an old railroad grade then enters into a residential area at the intersection with Front Street. The roadway continues east for .5 miles (0.80 km) then intersects Main Street. K-47 proceeds another .5 miles (0.80 km) then exits the city. The highway soon crosses over Flat Rock Creek, then crosses over Downey Creek about .75 miles (1.21 km) later. The roadway continues through for one mile (1.6 km) before intersecting Wallace Road. K-47 then crosses over Brogan Creek and then enters into Crawford County about 1.5 miles (2.4 km) later.

=== Crawford County ===
The highway continues through flat farmland for 1.3 miles (2.1 km) then crosses Murphy Creek. After about 1.7 miles (2.7 km) the roadway intersects 40th Street, which travels south to K-126 and McCune. K-47 continues east for 1.6 miles (2.6 km) then enters forested area and crosses Hickory Creek. The trees clear and the highway enters the unincorporated community of Greenbush. The roadway then intersects the southern terminus of K-3 about 1.3 miles (2.1 km) later. K-3 travels north to Hepler, as K-47 continues east and soon crosses Elm Creek. The roadway continues through flat farmland for approximately 3.1 miles (5.0 km) before crossing Lightning Creek. K-47 continues east for 1.5 miles (2.4 km) before entering Girard as St. John Street. The highway continues for about .7 miles (1.1 km) then passes a hospital, where it expands to four lanes. The roadway enters a more residential area and then after .75 miles (1.21 km) intersects K-7, also known as Summit Street. K-47 continues east for .3 miles (0.48 km) then has an at-grade crossing with a BNSF Railway track. Approximately .25 miles (0.40 km) later the highway downgrades to two lanes as it exits the city. K-47 continues east for 1.3 miles (2.1 km) then crosses Second Cow Creek then Clear Creek. The highway continues through farmland for 3.38 miles (5.44 km) then passes through unincorporated community of Edison. The roadway continues east for 1.1 miles (1.8 km) and crosses over First Cow Creek. K-47 then reaches its eastern terminus at US-69 and US-69 Business (US-69 Bus.) in Franklin, south of Arma.

== History ==
=== Early roads ===
Prior to the formation of the Kansas state highway system, there were auto trails, which were an informal network of marked routes that existed in the United States and Canada in the early part of the 20th century. The highway's western terminus followed the former Capitol Route, which ran from Austin, Texas to Omaha, Nebraska. In Kansas the Capitol Route began at Oklahoma border and travelled north through Independence, Lyndon, Topeka, and Horton to the Nebraska border. K-47 crosses US-169, which closely follows the former Oil Belt Route and one of the former Ozark Trails. K-47 overlaps the section of US-59, which closely follows the former King of Trails, which ran from Galveston and Brownsville in Texas to Winnipeg, Manitoba. In Girard crosses the former Jefferson Highway, which ran from New Orleans, Louisiana to Winnipeg, Manitoba, and the former Kansas City-Ft. Scott-Miami-Tulsa Short Line. The eastern terminus closely follows one of the former Ozark Trails.

=== Establishment and realignments ===
K-47 sign used when first established

In 1926, the section between Fredonia and Altoona was designated K-39, and the section from Erie to Girard was designated as K-57. By 1928, K-47 was established to a highway that ran from K-96 and K-39 in Fredonia northeast to US-75 by Buffalo. By 1929, it was slightly realigned to pass through Benedict, and the southern terminus was extended west over K-39 to Altoona then east over a new highway to K-16 south of Earleton. By 1930, K-47 was truncated to end by Fredonia, with the former section of K-47 between there and Benedict becoming a realignment of K-39 and former section between Benedict and Buffalo being removed from the state highway system. By 1936, K-16 was decommissioned and became US-169. Between 1933 and 1936, K-96 was realigned to travel north from Fredonia along K-39. Then in a July 1, 1937, resolution, it was approved to extend K-47 from Fredonia in a northwest direction, along the former alignment of K-96, through New Albany to K-96. In a January 23, 1946, resolution, it was approved to extend K-47 from US-169 east to US-59 south of Erie. The extension was completed between 1948 and 1950. In a September 9, 1953, resolution, it was approved to truncate K-47's western terminus to end at K-39 and K-96 in Fredonia.

Just west of Altoona, K-47 turned south onto modern day Million Dollar Highway. After about .8 miles (1.3 km) it turned east onto 1025 Road, which it followed into the city. In a December 28, 1949, resolution, it was approved to realign the highway to travel directly east into Altoona. That month, condemnation proceedings began to acquire the right-of-way for the new section of highway. In March 1954, a $155,185 (equivalent to $1.86 million in 2025) contract was awarded to Hixson & Lehenbauer of Topeka to complete the project. The realignment was completed in 1955. In June 1964, construction began to rebuild the highway between Fredonia and the section rebuilt by Altoona in 1955. Sight distances were improved, curves were eliminated, and grades were reduced by making rock cuts. For example, the steep grade on Burton's Hill, three miles (4.8 km) east of Fredonia, was reduced from 5.6% to 2.8% grade. The new section was completed in early October 1965. US-75 originally ran north-south along Quincy Street through Altoona. In September 1963, there was a public hearing to discuss the realignment of US-75 by Altoona. Then in a December 2, 1964, resolution, it was approved to build a new alignment of US-75 slightly east of the old one. The old alignment was redesignated as US-75 Business. The new $327,000 (equivalent to $2.52 million in 2025) alignment of US-75 was completed in August 1967.

In a December 1, 1994, resolution, it was approved to establish US-400 in Kansas, which followed K-96 to Fredonia then turned east and followed K-47 to US-59. In a May 3, 1995, resolution, it was approved to build a new highway between northwest of Fredonia and Neodesha and to move K-96 and US-400 onto it. At that time the overlap between K-47 and US-400 was eliminated. In a December 3, 1998, resolution, it was approved to truncate K-96 to end at US-400 by Wichita. The realignment of US-400 was completed by 1999. In a May 14, 2003, resolution, it was approved to truncate K-57 to end at US-169 by Colony. At this time K-47 was extended east over the former K-57 to US-69 by Franklin.

== Major intersections ==
County	Location	mi	km	Destinations	Notes
Wilson	Fredonia	0.000	0.000	North 20th Street / Washington Street	Western terminus
Wilson	Fredonia	0.347	0.558	US-400 – Parsons, Wichita	Roundabout
Wilson	Altoona	8.151	13.118	US 75 Bus. (Quincy Street)	
Wilson	Altoona	8.311	13.375	US-75 – Yates Center, Neodesha	
Neosho		18.484	29.747	US-169 – Iola, Coffeyville	
Neosho		29.537	47.535	US-59 north (Ottawa Road) – Erie	Western end of US-59 concurrency
Neosho		30.459	49.019	US-59 south (Ottawa Road) – Parsons	Eastern end of US-59 concurrency
Crawford	Greenbush	47.514	76.466	K-3 north – Hepler, Walnut	Southern terminus of K-3
Crawford	Girard	53.951	86.826	K-7 (Summit Street) – Ft. Scott, Columbus	
Crawford	Franklin	61.556	99.065	US 69 Bus. north (620th Avenue) / US-69 – Ft. Scott, Pittsburg, Arma	Eastern terminus; road continues north as US-69 Bus. (620th Ave.)
1.000 mi = 1.609 km; 1.000 km = 0.621 mi: Concurrency terminus

== See also ==
- List of state highways in Kansas
- List of highways numbered 47
