= Scott Township, Kansas =

Scott Township, Kansas may refer to one of the following places:

- Scott Township, Bourbon County, Kansas
- Scott Township, Lincoln County, Kansas
- Scott Township, Linn County, Kansas
- Scott Township, Scott County, Kansas

See also

- Scott Township (disambiguation)
