= Liberty Township, Labette County, Kansas =

Liberty Township
- Township
- Location in Labette County
- Coordinates: 37°15′15″N 95°12′55″W
- Country: United States
- State: Kansas
- County: Labette

Area
  - Total: 36.608 sq mi (94.81 km^{2})
  - Land: 36.17 sq mi (93.7 km^{2})
  - Water: 0.438 sq mi (1.13 km^{2}) 1.20%

Population (2020)
  - Total: 471
  - Density: 13.0/sq mi (5.03/km^{2})
- Time zone: UTC-6 (CST)
  - Summer (DST): UTC-5 (CDT)
- Area code: 620

Liberty Township is a township in Labette County, Kansas, United States. As of the 2020 census, its population was 471.

== Geography ==
Liberty Township covers an area of 36.608 square miles (94.81 square kilometers).

=== Communities ===
- Labette

=== Adjacent townships ===
- North Township, Labette County (north)
- Neosho Township, Labette County (northeast)
- Montana Township, Labette County (east)
- Oswego Township, Labette County (southeast)
- Fairview Township, Labette County (south)
- Mount Pleasant Township, Labette County (southwest)
- Labette Township, Labette County (west)
- Walton Township, Labette County (northwest)

=== Major highways ===
- US 59
