= Colfax Township =

Colfax Township may refer to the following places in the United States:

- Colfax Township, Champaign County, Illinois
- Colfax Township, Newton County, Indiana
- Colfax Township, Boone County, Iowa
- Colfax Township, Grundy County, Iowa
- Colfax Township, Cloud County, Kansas
- Colfax Township, Marion County, Kansas
- Colfax Township, Wilson County, Kansas
- Colfax Township, Benzie County, Michigan
- Colfax Township, Huron County, Michigan
- Colfax Township, Mecosta County, Michigan
- Colfax Township, Oceana County, Michigan
- Colfax Township, Wexford County, Michigan
- Colfax Township, Minnesota
- Colfax Township, Atchison County, Missouri
- Colfax Township, Harrison County, Missouri
