= Franklin, Kansas =

Unincorporated community in Crawford County, Kansas

- CDP
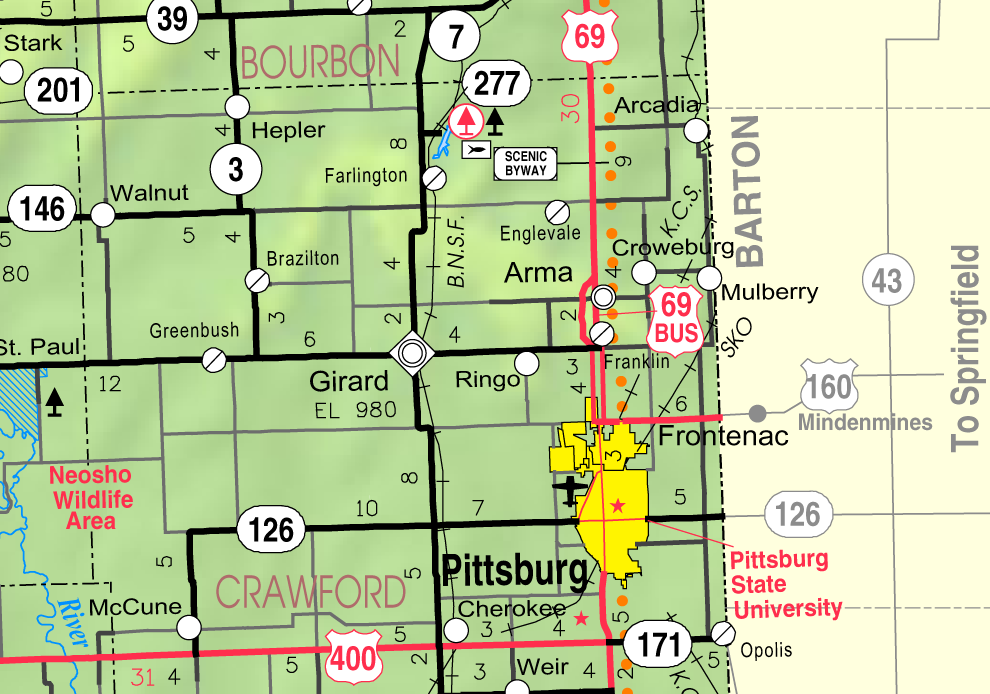
- KDOT map of Crawford County (legend)

- Location within Kansas Location within the United States
- Coordinates: 37°31′23″N 94°41′58″W
- Country: United States
- State: Kansas
- County: Crawford

Area
  - Total: 1.72 sq mi (4.46 km^{2})
  - Land: 1.71 sq mi (4.43 km^{2})
  - Water: 0.012 sq mi (0.03 km^{2})
- Elevation: 984 ft (300 m)

Population (2020)
  - Total: 473
  - Density: 277/sq mi (107/km^{2})
- Time zone: UTC-6 (CST)
  - Summer (DST): UTC-5 (CDT)
- ZIP Code: 66735
- Area code: 620
- FIPS code: 20-24325
- GNIS ID: 2629157
- Website: franklinkansas.com

Franklin is a census-designated place (CDP) in Crawford County, Kansas, United States. As of the 2020 census, the population was 473. Franklin is located along U.S. Route 69, 1 mile (1.6 km) south of Arma, or 5.9 miles (9.5 km) north of Frontenac.

== History ==
Franklin began as a mining community in the early 1900s. It is located just off Highway 69 Bypass which is a major corridor between Kansas City and Pittsburg, Ks./Joplin, Mo. Franklin was a shipping point on the Joplin & Pittsburg electric railroad. The first post office in Franklin was established in 1908.

On May 4, 2003, a high-end F4 tornado ripped through Franklin, the path reached over 0.5 miles (0.80 km) wide at points. Franklin was all but destroyed, the U.S. Post Office, community center, and approximately 1/3 of family homes were destroyed. Four deaths and approximately 20 injuries were reported.

Franklin has a post office with ZIP Code 66735.

== Demographics ==
Historical population
Census	Pop.	Note	%±
2010	375		—
2020	473		26.1%
U.S. Decennial Census

The 2020 United States census counted 473 people, 173 households, and 117 families in Franklin. The population density was 276.8 per square mile (106.9/km^{2}). There were 190 housing units at an average density of 111.2 per square mile (42.9/km^{2}). The racial makeup was 90.27% (427) white or European American (89.22% non-Hispanic white), 1.06% (5) black or African-American, 0.21% (1) Native American or Alaska Native, 0.0% (0) Asian, 0.0% (0) Pacific Islander or Native Hawaiian, 0.85% (4) from other races, and 7.61% (36) from two or more races. Hispanic or Latino of any race was 4.23% (20) of the population.

Of the 173 households, 29.5% had children under the age of 18; 60.1% were married couples living together; 17.3% had a female householder with no spouse or partner present. 27.7% of households consisted of individuals and 11.0% had someone living alone who was 65 years of age or older. The average household size was 3.0 and the average family size was 3.4. The percent of those with a bachelor's degree or higher was estimated to be 15.6% of the population.

27.1% of the population was under the age of 18, 7.2% from 18 to 24, 24.3% from 25 to 44, 23.5% from 45 to 64, and 18.0% who were 65 years of age or older. The median age was 37.5 years. For every 100 females, there were 97.9 males. For every 100 females ages 18 and older, there were 94.9 males.

The 2016–2020 5-year American Community Survey estimates show that the median household income was $33,333 (with a margin of error of +/- $27,411) and the median family income was $46,944 (+/- $23,817). Females had a median income of $31,979 (+/- $16,215) for females. The median income for those above 16 years old was $30,625 (+/- $23,568). Approximately, 29.9% of families and 43.3% of the population were below the poverty line, including 71.0% of those under the age of 18 and 0.0% of those ages 65 or over.

== Area attractions ==
=== Miners Hall Museum ===
Opened on May 1, 2012, the Miner's Hall Museum was established to preserve and present authentic materials and artifacts that document the history of coal mining and its impact on Southeast Kansas. One exhibit is of the "Amazon Army", a 1921 protest in which thousands of wives, daughters, mothers, sisters and sweethearts of striking coal miners halted work in the mines for three days.

=== Franklin Sidewalk ===
Constructed in 1936 with federal funding assistance, the Franklin Sidewalk connects two rural mining communities in Crawford County - Arma and Franklin. The three-foot wide sidewalk begins at the southern edge of Arma and stretches to the south, 1.7 miles to the southern edge of Franklin. It has become well known as the "longest sidewalk connecting two communities". It runs adjacent to Business 69 Highway, also known as "Jefferson Highway" and the "Frontier Military Scenic Byway". The Franklin Sidewalk appeared in the Guinness Book of World Records in the 1950s or 1960s. It was listed on the National Register of Historic Places by the United States Department of the Interior March 16, 2007 and on the Kansas Register of Historic Places November 18, 2006.

== Notable people ==
- Frank Wayenberg, baseball pitcher who appeared in two games for the 1924 Cleveland Indians
