= Neosho Township, Labette County, Kansas =

Township in Labette County, Kansas, U.S.

Neosho Township
- Township
- Location in Labette County
- Coordinates: 37°20′2″N 95°6′33″W
- Country: United States
- State: Kansas
- County: Labette

Area
  - Total: 27.773 sq mi (71.93 km^{2})
  - Land: 26.959 sq mi (69.82 km^{2})
  - Water: 0.774 sq mi (2.00 km^{2}) 2.79%

Population (2020)
  - Total: 160
  - Density: 5.9/sq mi (2.3/km^{2})
- Time zone: UTC-6 (CST)
  - Summer (DST): UTC-5 (CDT)
- Area code: 620

Neosho Township is a township in Labette County, Kansas, United States. As of the 2020 census, its population was 160.

== Geography ==
Neosho Township covers an area of 27.773 square miles (71.93 square kilometers).

=== Adjacent townships ===
- Lincoln Township, Neosho County (northwest)
- Osage Township, Crawford County (northeast)
- Sheridan Township, Cherokee County (southeast)
- Montana Township, Labette County (south)
- Liberty Township, Labette County (southwest)
- North Township, Labette County (west)

=== Major highways ===
- US 400
