= Cherry Township, Kansas =

Township in Montgomery County, Kansas, U.S.

Cherry Township
- Township
- Location within Montgomery County
- Coordinates: 37.320309°N 95.56724°W
- Country: United States
- State: Kansas
- County: Montgomery

Area
  - Total: 39.258 sq mi (101.68 km^{2})
  - Land: 39.252 sq mi (101.66 km^{2})
  - Water: 0.006 sq mi (0.016 km^{2}) 0.02%

Population (2020)
  - Total: 462
  - Density: 11.8/sq mi (4.54/km^{2})
- Time zone: UTC-6 (CST)
  - Summer (DST): UTC-5 (CDT)
- Area code: 620

Cherry Township is a township in Montgomery County, Kansas, United States. As of the 2020 census, its population was 462. It completely surrounds the city of Cherryvale, although the city is independent of the township.

== Geography ==
Cherry Township covers an area of 39.258 square miles (101.68 square kilometers).

=== Adjacent townships ===
- Newark Township, Wilson County (north)
- Shiloh Township, Neosho County (northeast)
- Osage Township, Labette County (east)
- Mound Valley Township, Labette County (southeast)
- Drum Creek Township, Montgomery County (south)
- West Cherry Township, Montgomery County (west)

=== Major highways ===
- US-166
- US-400
