= Interstate 635 (Kansas–Missouri) =

Highway in Kansas and Missouri

Interstate 635
- Harry Darby Memorial Highway
- I-635 highlighted in red

Route information
- Auxiliary route of I-35
- Length: 12.67 mi (20.39 km)
- Existed: 1975–present
- NHS: Entire route

Major junctions
- South end: I-35 / US-69 in Overland Park, KS
- K-32 in Kansas City, KS; I-70 / US-24 / US-40 / Kansas Turnpike in Kansas City, KS; K-5 in Kansas City, KS; US 69 / Route 9 in Riverside, MO
- North end: I-29 / US 71 in Kansas City, MO

Location
- Country: United States
- States: Kansas, Missouri
- Counties: KS: Johnson, Wyandotte; MO: Platte

Highway system
- Interstate Highway System; Main; Auxiliary; Suffixed; Business; Future
- Kansas State Highway System; Interstate; US; State; Spurs
- Missouri State Highway System; Interstate; US; State; Supplemental
| ← I-470 | KS | → I-670 |
| ← Route 571 | MO | → I-670 |

Interstate 635 (I-635) is a connector highway between I-35 in Overland Park, Kansas, and I-29 in Kansas City, Missouri, approximately 12 miles (19 km) long. It is mostly in the US state of Kansas, servicing the city of Kansas City, Kansas, but extends into Kansas City, Missouri, as well. The freeway's southern terminus is at a stack interchange with I-35. South of this, the mainline becomes an expressway carrying U.S. Route 69 (US 69).

The freeway provides a route around Downtown Kansas City by crossing through residential areas of Kansas City, Kansas, and Riverside, Missouri. It also provides another direct route to Kansas City International Airport.

== Route description ==
=== Kansas ===
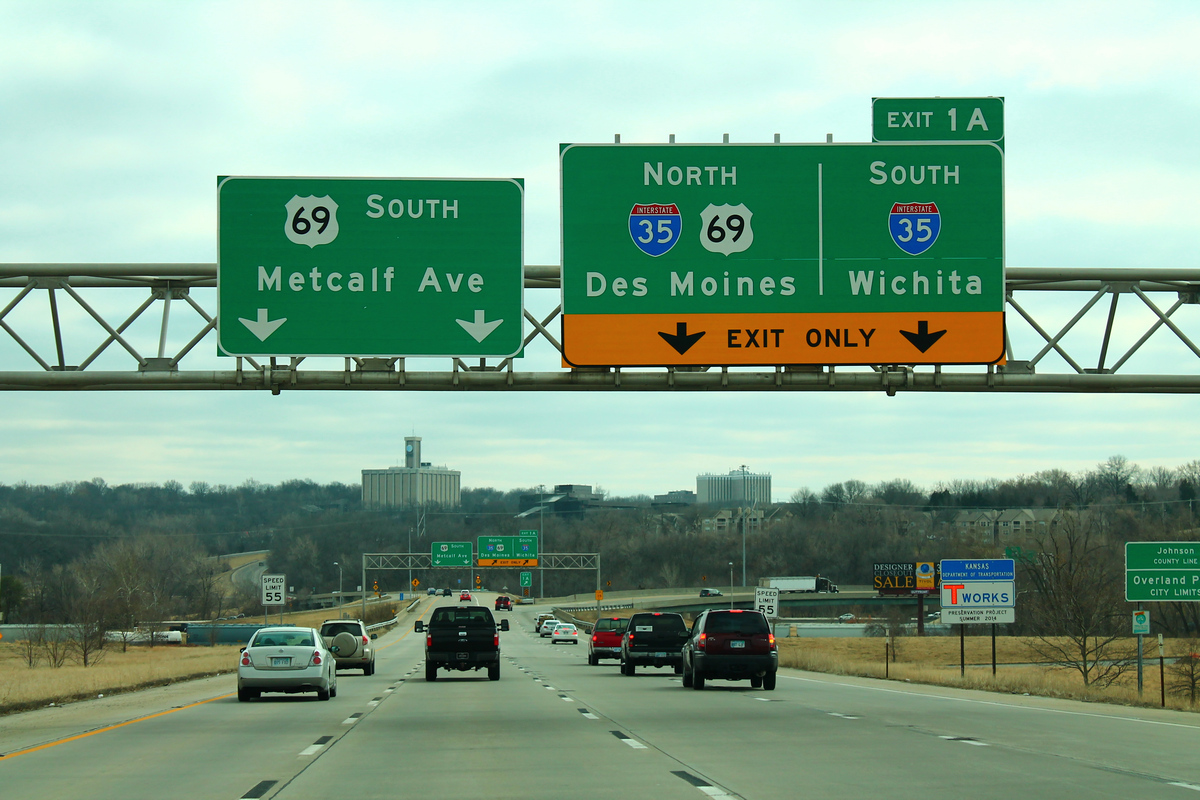
I-635 approaching its southern terminus

I-635 begins at I-35 in Johnson County near Shawnee, Kansas, at exit 1A. There is a parclo interchange with Merriam Drive at exit 1B almost immediately after its terminus. It then enters Wyandotte County and Kansas City, Kansas. There is a diamond interchange with Shawnee Drive at exit 1C and a parclo interchange with Metropolitan Avenue at exit 1A upon entering the Argentine neighborhood. There is an interchange with K-32/Kansas Avenue at exit 3 and then crosses the Kansas River into central Kansas City, Kansas. Immediately after crossing the river, there is an interchange with I-70 at exits 4A and 4B. There are several interchanges further north, including State Avenue (exit 5), Parallel Parkway (exit 6), and Leavenworth Road and North 38th Street (exit 7). The last public interchange before entering Missouri is K-5. A private maintenance facility crossing at grade exists between this exit and the Missouri River.

=== Missouri ===
Like I-435, I-635's mileposts do not reset after crossing into Missouri.

I-635 crosses the Missouri River from Kansas into Platte County and the city of Riverside, Missouri. There is an interchange with Horizons Parkway at exit 9 and then US 69 at exit 10. US 69 briefly runs concurrently with I-635 north before exiting at the interchange with Route 9 (exits 11A and 11B). I-635 runs about one more mile north, then terminates at I-29/US 71 at exits 12A and 12B.

== History ==
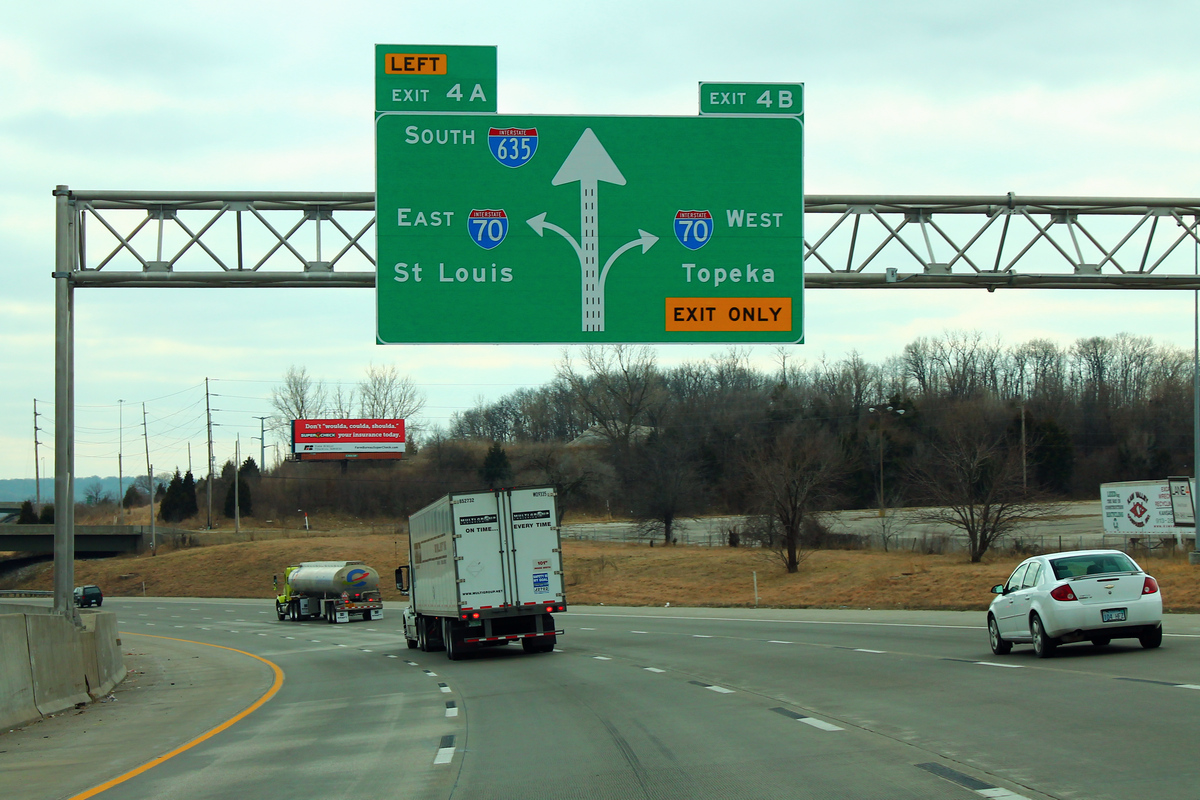
I-635 southbound approaching its interchange with I-70

Missouri began the plans for I-635 in 1958 when American Association of State Highway and Transportation Officials (AASHTO) approved proposals that also included what would become I-435 and I-470; the plan for I-635 took the route eastward along what is now K-5 to US 69 and northward across the Fairfax Bridge toward I-29. When money from the Highway Trust Fund became available for a new Missouri River crossing, I-635 got a more westward alignment after 1968. Part of the original alignment was built as a spur going into Fairfax as K-5.

In 1990, the highway was given the name Harry Darby Memorial Highway, in honor of US Senator Harry Darby.

The interchange with I-70 and the bridge over the Santa Fe Railyard in Argentine were reconstructed in 2004.

Maintenance work on the bridge over the Missouri River finished in September 2005.

== Exit list ==
| State | County | Location | mi | km | Exit | Destinations | Notes |
|---|---|---|---|---|---|---|---|
| Kansas | Johnson | Overland Park | 0.00 | 0.00 | | US-69 south (Metcalf Avenue) | Southern terminus; continuation beyond I-35 |
| Kansas | Johnson | Overland Park | 0.00 | 0.00 | 1A | US-69 north / I-35 – Des Moines, Wichita | Southbound exit and northbound entrance; I-35 exits 231A–B |
| Kansas | Wyandotte | Kansas City | 0.5 | 0.80 | 1B | Merriam Lane, Merriam Drive | |
| Kansas | Wyandotte | Kansas City | 1.0 | 1.6 | 1C | Shawnee Drive | |
| Kansas | Wyandotte | Kansas City | 2.3 | 3.7 | 2A | Metropolitan Avenue | |
| Kansas | Wyandotte | Kansas City | 2.9 | 4.7 | 2B | Swartz Road | Southbound exit and northbound entrance |
| Kansas | Wyandotte | Kansas City | 3.7 | 6.0 | 3 | K-32 (Kansas Avenue) | |
| Kansas | Wyandotte | Kansas City | 4.5 | 7.2 | 4 | I-70 / US-24 / US-40 / Kansas Turnpike – Topeka, St. Louis | Signed as exits 4A (east) & 4B (west); I-70 exits 418A–B eastbound, 419 westbound. |
| Kansas | Wyandotte | Kansas City | 5.4 | 8.7 | 5 | State Avenue | Access to Kansas State School for the Blind and Donnelly College |
| Kansas | Wyandotte | Kansas City | 6.3 | 10.1 | 6 | Parallel Parkway | |
| Kansas | Wyandotte | Kansas City | 7.3 | 11.7 | 7 | K-5 north (Leavenworth Road) / 38th Street | Southern end of K-5 concurrency. |
| Kansas | Wyandotte | Kansas City | 8.3 | 13.4 | 8 | K-5 south / 18th Street | Northern end of K-5 concurrency; left exit and entrance southbound. Access to Fairfax District. |
| Missouri River | | | 9.0– 9.2 | 14.5– 14.8 | Kansas–Missouri state line | | |
| Missouri | Platte | Riverside | 9.5 | 15.3 | 9 | Horizons Parkway / Argosy Casino Parkway | |
| Missouri | Platte | Riverside | 10.6 | 17.1 | 10 | US 69 south (Fairfax District Way) | Southern end of US 69 concurrency; southbound exit and northbound entrance |
| Missouri | Platte | Riverside | 11.0 | 17.7 | 11 | US 69 north / Route 9 – Riverside, Parkville | Northern end of US 69 concurrency; signed as exits 11A (US 69/Rte. 9) and 11B (Rte. 9 north). Access to Park University. |
| Missouri | Platte | Riverside | 12.7 | 20.4 | 12 | I-29 / US 71 – St. Joseph | Northern terminus; I-29 exit 3B; signed as exits 12A (north) & 12B (south); tri-stack interchange. Access to Kansas City International Airport and Downtown. |
1.000 mi = 1.609 km; 1.000 km = 0.621 mi: Concurrency terminus; Incomplete access
