= Drum Creek Township, Kansas =

Township in Montgomery County, Kansas, U.S.

Drum Creek Township
- Township
- Location within Montgomery County
- Coordinates: 37.23127°N 95.592594°W
- Country: United States
- State: Kansas
- County: Montgomery

Area
  - Total: 35.437 sq mi (91.78 km^{2})
  - Land: 35.358 sq mi (91.58 km^{2})
  - Water: 0.079 sq mi (0.20 km^{2}) 0.22%

Population (2020)
  - Total: 494
  - Density: 14.0/sq mi (5.39/km^{2})
- Time zone: UTC-6 (CST)
  - Summer (DST): UTC-5 (CDT)
- Area code: 620

Drum Creek Township is a township in Montgomery County, Kansas, United States. As of the 2020 census, its population was 494.

== Geography ==
Drum Creek Township covers an area of 35.437 square miles (91.78 square kilometers). The Verdigris River flows through it.

=== Adjacent townships ===
- West Cherry Township, Montgomery County (north)
- Cherry Township, Montgomery County (northeast)
- Mound Valley Township, Labette County (east)
- Liberty Township, Montgomery County (south)
- Independence Township, Montgomery County (west)
- Sycamore Township, Montgomery County (northwest)

=== Major highways ===
- US-160
- US-169
