= Ladore Township, Kansas =

Township in Neosho County, Kansas, U.S.

Ladore Township
- Township
- Location within Neosho County
- Coordinates: 37.4275°N 95.3000°W
- Country: United States
- State: Kansas
- County: Neosho

Area
  - Total: 48.124 sq mi (124.64 km^{2})
  - Land: 46.838 sq mi (121.31 km^{2})
  - Water: 1.286 sq mi (3.33 km^{2}) 2.67%

Population (2020)
  - Total: 367
  - Density: 7.84/sq mi (3.03/km^{2})
- Time zone: UTC-6 (CST)
  - Summer (DST): UTC-5 (CDT)
- Area code: 620

Ladore Township is a township in Neosho County, Kansas, United States.

== History ==
Ladore Township was organized in 1871.

== Geography ==
Ladore Township covers an area of 48.124 square miles (124.64 square kilometers). Lake Parsons is located within the township.

=== Communities ===
- part of Galesburg

=== Adjacent townships ===
- Centerville Township, Neosho County (north)
- Mission Township, Neosho County (northeast)
- Lincoln Township, Neosho County (east)
- North Township, Labette County (southeast)
- Walton Township, Labette County (south)
- Osage Township, Labette County (southwest)
- Shiloh Township, Neosho County (west)
- Chetopa Township, Neosho County (northwest)

=== Major highways ===
- US-59
