= Montana Township, Labette County, Kansas =

Montana Township
- Township
- Location in Labette County
- Coordinates: 37°14′58″N 95°6′45″W
- Country: United States
- State: Kansas
- County: Labette

Area
  - Total: 27.579 sq mi (71.43 km^{2})
  - Land: 27.207 sq mi (70.47 km^{2})
  - Water: 0.552 sq mi (1.43 km^{2}) 2.00%

Population (2020)
  - Total: 150
  - Density: 5.5/sq mi (2.1/km^{2})
- Time zone: UTC-6 (CST)
  - Summer (DST): UTC-5 (CDT)
- Area code: 620

Montana Township is a township in Labette County, Kansas, United States. As of the 2020 census, its population was 150.

== Geography ==
Liberty Township covers an area of 27.579 square miles (71.43 square kilometers).

=== Communities ===
- Montana

=== Adjacent townships ===
- Neosho Township, Labette County (north)
- Sheridan Township, Cherokee County (northeast)
- Lola Township, Cherokee County (southeast)
- Oswego Township, Labette County (south)
- Fairview Township, Labette County (southwest)
- Liberty Township, Labette County (west)
- North Township, Labette County (northwest)
