= North Township, Kansas =

Township in Labette County, Kansas, U.S.

North Township
- Township
- Location in Labette County
- Coordinates: 37°20′11″N 95°12′18″W
- Country: United States
- State: Kansas
- County: Labette

Area
  - Total: 31.673 sq mi (82.03 km^{2})
  - Land: 31.213 sq mi (80.84 km^{2})
  - Water: 0.46 sq mi (1.2 km^{2}) 1.45%

Population (2020)
  - Total: 591
  - Density: 18.9/sq mi (7.31/km^{2})
- Time zone: UTC-6 (CST)
  - Summer (DST): UTC-5 (CDT)
- Area code: 620

North Township is a township in Labette County, Kansas, United States. As of the 2020 census, its population was 591.

== Geography ==
North Township covers an area of 31.673 square miles (82.03 square kilometers).

=== Adjacent townships ===
- Lincoln Township, Neosho County (northeast)
- Neosho Township, Labette County (east)
- Montana Township, Labette County (southeast)
- Liberty Township, Labette County (south)
- Labette Township, Labette County (southwest)
- Walton Township, Labette County (west)
- Ladore Township, Neosho County northwest)

=== Major highways ===
- US 400
