= Greenbush, Kansas =

Unincorporated community in Crawford County, Kansas, United States

- Unincorporated community
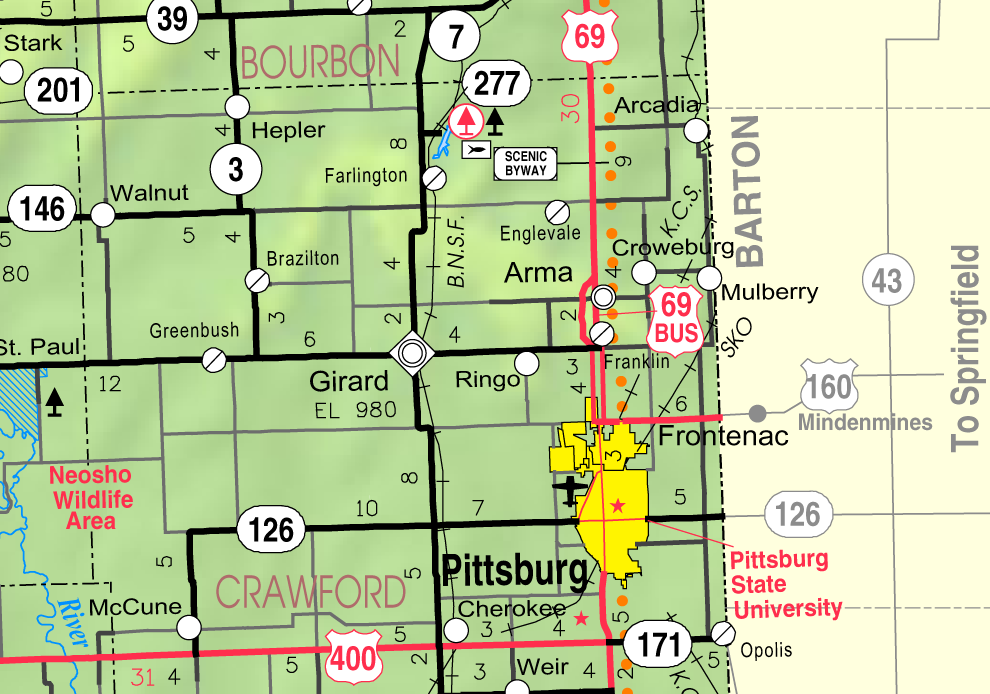
- KDOT map of Crawford County (legend)

- Location within Kansas Location within the United States
- Coordinates: 37°30′52″N 94°59′17″W
- Country: United States
- State: Kansas
- County: Crawford
- Elevation: 981 ft (299 m)
- Time zone: UTC-6 (CST)
  - Summer (DST): UTC-5 (CDT)
- Area code: 620
- FIPS code: 20-28475
- GNIS ID: 475130

Greenbush is an unincorporated community in Crawford County, Kansas, United States. It is located 6.5 miles (10.5 km) west of Girard along K-47 highway.

== History ==
The post office was established 1874 and discontinued in 1901.

== Education ==
The community is served by Girard USD 248 public school district.
