= Walton Township, Labette County, Kansas =

Township in Labette County, Kansas, U.S.

Walton Township
- Township
- Location in Labette County
- Coordinates: 37°20′25″N 95°19′38″W
- Country: United States
- State: Kansas
- County: Labette

Area
  - Total: 32.046 sq mi (83.00 km^{2})
  - Land: 31.693 sq mi (82.08 km^{2})
  - Water: 0.353 sq mi (0.91 km^{2}) 1.10%

Population (2020)
  - Total: 711
  - Density: 22.4/sq mi (8.66/km^{2})
- Time zone: UTC-6 (CST)
  - Summer (DST): UTC-5 (CDT)
- Area code: 620

Walton Township is a township in Labette County, Kansas, United States. As of the 2020 census, its population was 711.

== Geography ==
Walton Township covers an area of 32.046 square miles (83.00 square kilometers).

=== Adjacent townships ===
- Ladore Township, Neosho County (north)
- North Township, Labette County (east)
- Liberty Township, Labette County (southeast)
- Labette Township, Labette County (south)
- Osage Township, Labette County (west)

=== Major highways ===
- US 59
- US 400
