= Mount Colfax =

Mountain in New York, United States

- Location within New York Adirondack Park Location within the United States

Highest point
- Elevation: 1,266 feet (386 m)
- Coordinates: 43°05′26″N 73°23′41″W

Geography
- Location: N of Cambridge, Washington County, New York, U.S.
- Topo map: USGS Cambridge

Mount Colfax is a 1,266-foot-tall (386 m) mountain in the Capital District of New York. It is located north of Cambridge in Washington County. The mountain is the site of an 80-foot-tall (24 m) former fire lookout tower, which is closed to the public.

== History ==
In 1950, the Conservation Department built an 80-foot-tall (24 m) Aermotor LS40 steel fire lookout tower on the mountain. The tower began fire lookout operations in 1951, reporting 23 fires and 750 visitors. Due to the increased use of aerial detection, the tower ceased fire lookout operations at the end of the 1970 fire lookout season. The tower still remains but is closed to the public.
