= Colfax High School =

Colfax High School may refer to:

- Colfax High School (California) in Colfax, California
- Colfax High School, Colfax, Louisiana, a former school
- Colfax Junior-Senior High School (Washington) in Colfax, Washington
- Colfax High School (Wisconsin) in Colfax, Wisconsin
