= K-5 (Kansas highway) =

State highway in Kansas, U.S.

K-5
- Frontier Military Scenic Byway
- K-5 highlighted in red

Route information
- Maintained by KDOT and the city of Kansas City
- Length: 24.072 mi (38.740 km)

Major junctions
- South end: US-69 in Kansas City, Kansas
- I-635 in Kansas City; I-435 in Kansas City
- North end: US-73 / K-7 in Leavenworth

Location
- Country: United States
- State: Kansas
- Counties: Wyandotte, Leavenworth

Highway system
- Kansas State Highway System; Interstate; US; State; Spurs
← K-4	→ K-6

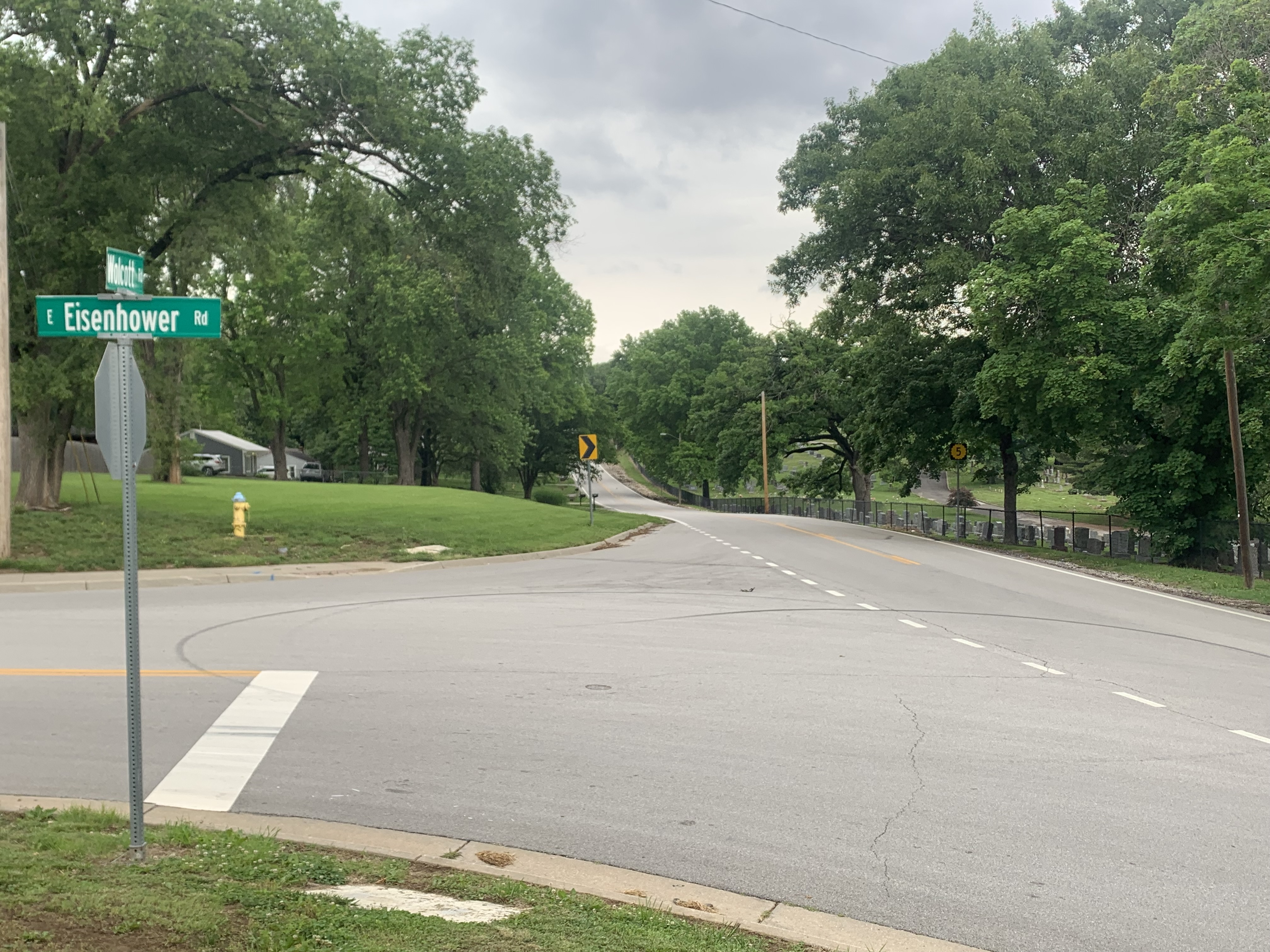
Kansas Highway 5 in northern Lansing, Kansas beside Mount Muncie Cemetery

K-5 is a 24-mile-long (39 km) state highway in northeastern Kansas. Remaining completely in the Kansas City metropolitan area, it connects Leavenworth to Kansas City.

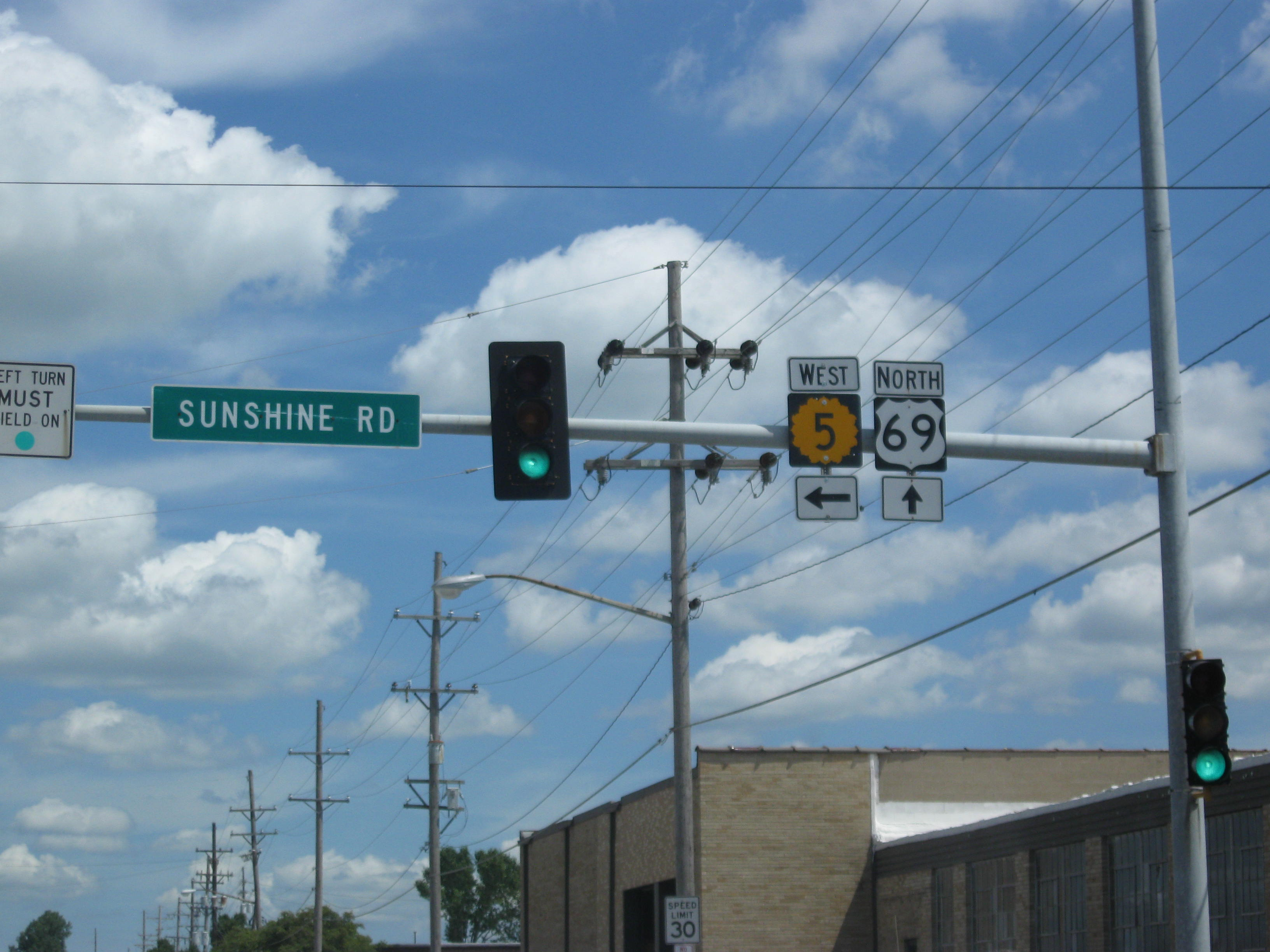
K-5's eastern terminus at U.S. 69 in Kansas City.

== Route description ==
K-5 begins on Sunshine Road at US-69 just south of the US 69 Missouri River Bridge. From there, it heads west until it turns off of Sunshine Rd. onto its own freeway alignment, which lasts for about two miles (3.2 km). It then merges onto Interstate 635 south, then follows Leavenworth Road west until it meets Interstate 435. K-5 merges onto northbound I-435, splitting off two exits later. After heading north on 97th Street, and turning onto Hutton Road, it then follows Wolcott Drive towards Lansing. Inside the Lansing area, it turns onto 8th Street, then onto Muncie Drive in Leavenworth. K-5 then ends at 4th Street (US-73/K-7) in Leavenworth.

K-5 mostly parallels the Missouri River for its entire run. The road's direction signs changed from west–east to north–south around 2010, although portions of it in Kansas City are still signed west–east.

In 2015, The Kansas state legislature passed Statute 68-1038, which designation the portion of K-5 between US-73/K-7 to I-435, then from I-435 to US-69, and southward on US-69 to the Oklahoma border, as the Frontier Military Scenic Byway.

== History ==
Originally, the portion of K-5 between I-635 and US-69 in Kansas was planned to be designated as I-635. The interstate was planned to head eastward from where it meets K-5 until it meets US-69, at which point it would turn northward and cross the Fairfax Bridge over the Missouri River. However, the plan was never carried out and the highway segment between I-635 and US-69 in the northern area of Kansas City was to be designated as K-6. In 1981, K-6 became part of K-5, when K-5 was moved off of Quindaro Boulevard.

In May 2025, the Kansas Department of Transportation (KDOT) closed K-5 between I-635 and US-69 for a deck replacement project on the bridge over the Union Pacific Railroad. As of February 2026, the bridge project was expected to continue through May 2026.

K-6
- Location: Kansas City
- Existed: 1968–1981

== Major intersections ==
County	Location	mi	km	Exit	Destinations	Notes
Wyandotte	Kansas City	0.000	0.000		US-69 (7th Street Trafficway)	Southern terminus; continues east as Sunshine Road
Wyandotte	Kansas City	0.333	0.536		Sunshine Road west / McCormick Road north	East end of freeway section
Wyandotte	Kansas City	0.816	1.313	—	10th Street	Westbound exit and eastbound entrance
Wyandotte	Kansas City	1.738	2.797	—	18th Street	
Wyandotte	Kansas City	2.242	3.608		I-635 north	I-635 exit 8
Wyandotte	Kansas City	2.440	3.927		I-635 south	West end of freeway section; I-635 exit 7; access to I-635 south from K-5 east via 38th Street
Wyandotte	Kansas City	11.009	17.717		I-435 south / Leavenworth Road west	I-435 exits 15A-B; orientation change between west/east and north/south; south end of freeway section
Wyandotte	Kansas City	11.809	19.005	16	Donahoo Road	Exit number follows I-435
Wyandotte	Kansas City	14.005	22.539		I-435 north	I-435 exit 18; north end of freeway section
Leavenworth	Leavenworth	24.072	38.740		US-73 / K-7 (4th Street)	Northern terminus; continues west as Muncie Road
1.000 mi = 1.609 km; 1.000 km = 0.621 mi: Concurrency terminus; Incomplete access; Route transition
