= Harding, Kansas =

- Unincorporated community
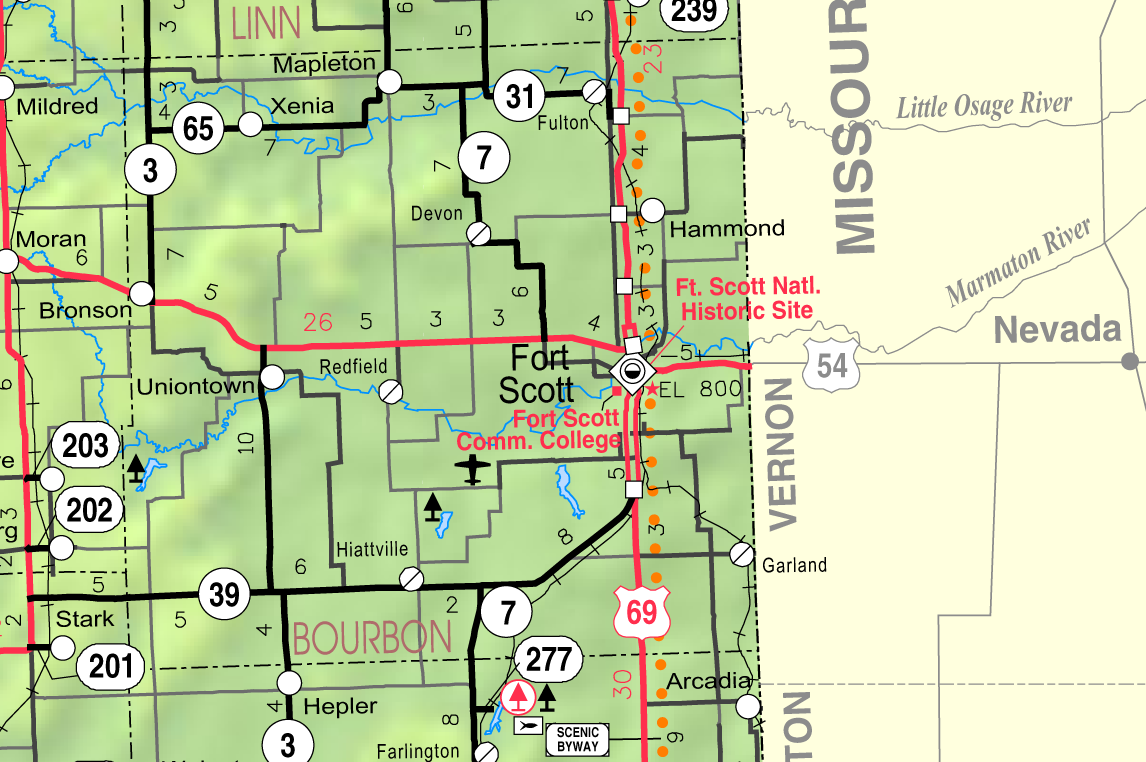
- KDOT map of Bourbon County (legend)
- Coordinates: 37°59′38″N 94°49′11″W
- Country: United States
- State: Kansas
- County: Bourbon
- Elevation: 853 ft (260 m)
- Time zone: UTC-6 (CST)
  - Summer (DST): UTC-5 (CDT)
- Area code: 620
- FIPS code: 20-29975
- GNIS ID: 474557

Harding is an unincorporated community in Bourbon County, Kansas, United States.

== History ==
A post office was established at Harding in 1888, and remained in operation until it was discontinued in 1933. The community was named for Russell Harding, a railroad official.
