= Colfax Marathon =

Annual race in the United States held since 2006

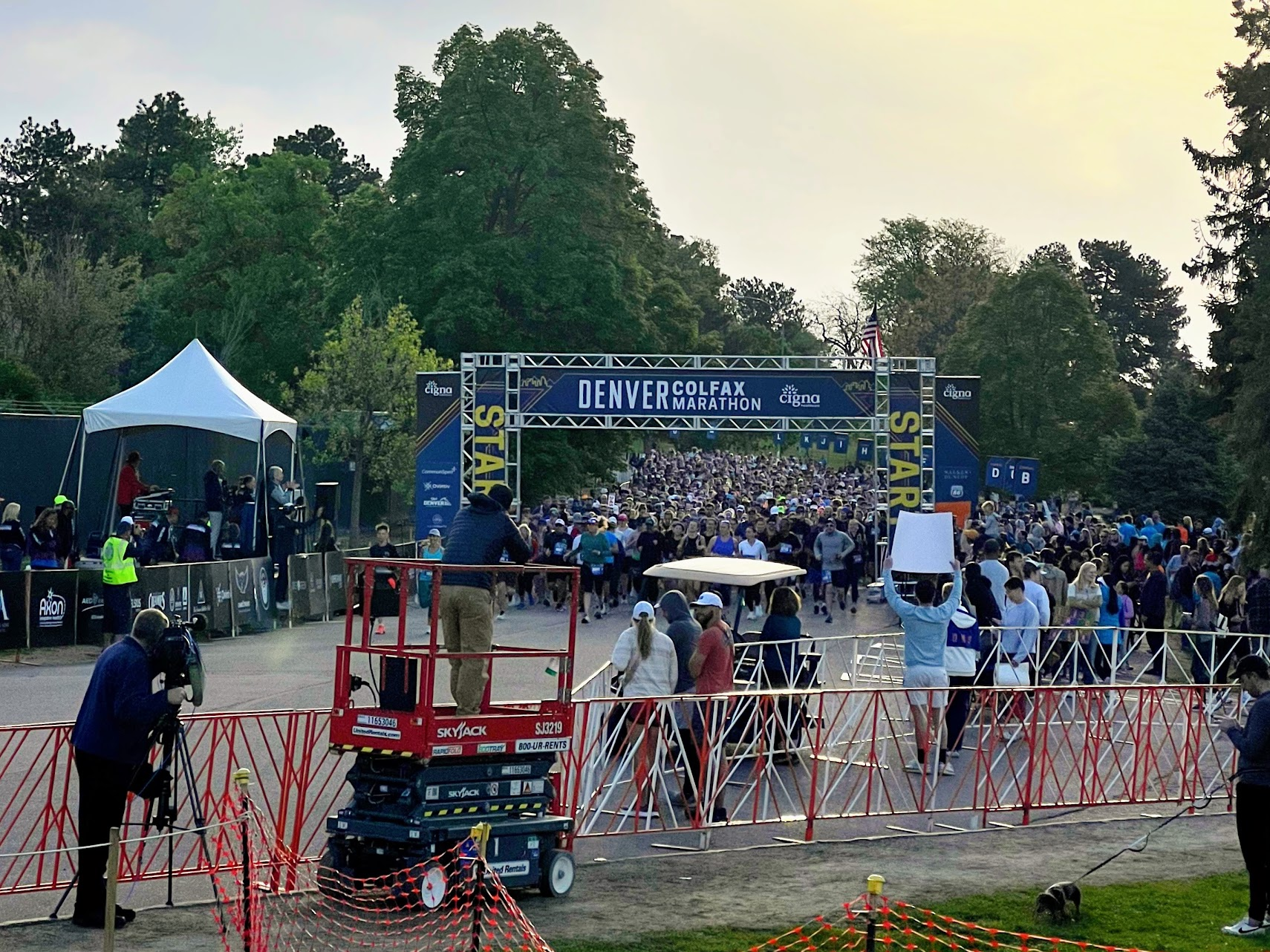
- Date: May
- Location: Denver, Colorado, U.S.
- Event type: Road
- Distance: Marathon
- Established: 2006 (20 years ago)
- Website: runcolfax.org
- Participants: 1502 finishers (2019)

The Colfax Marathon is an annual long-distance running event held in the Denver metropolitan area. The Colfax Marathon weekend is the largest marathon weekend in the Rocky Mountain region, with 25,000 runners in 2024. As Denver’s largest running event, the Colfax Marathon includes seven races over two days and a two-day health & fitness expo. Races include a marathon, half marathon, urban 10 miler, and a 5K. In addition, the marathon relay has teams in corporate, government or open divisions and is the second largest marathon relay in the United States.

== History ==
The Colfax Marathon was first held in 2006, with about 4,000 people taking part in the inaugural race.

The 2020 in-person edition of the race was cancelled due to the coronavirus pandemic, with all registrants given the option of running the race virtually or transferring their entry to 2021 or 2022. The 2021 edition of the race, originally scheduled for May, was postponed to October due to the pandemic. The event returned to its May date for 2022.

In 2023, 21,000 runners participated in the race weekend.

The marathon is a qualifying event for the Boston Marathon.

== Course ==
External images
- Course map of full marathon in 2006
- Marathon and half-marathon course map in 2008
- Course map of full marathon in 2019

The initial course followed Colfax Avenue for almost the entire race. It began in Aurora at the Aurora Sports Park, headed west through Denver, only departing the Avenue to detour briefly to the entrance of the Children's Hospital at Anschutz Medical Campus, as well as looping through City Park, Denver, before finishing in west Lakewood near Colorado Mills.

The course changed in 2008 to start and finish in City Park, with only portions of it along Colfax Avenue. The full marathon headed west to Lakewood and back; the half marathon east to Aurora and back.

Over time, the half marathon route has undergone various changes to incorporate various Denver landmarks, including the Colorado State Capitol, Civic Center Park, Fire Station No. 1, 16th Street Mall, the Colorado Convention Center, among others. The route also incorporates a "Zoo Mile" which allows runners to pass through the Denver Zoo.

Because of the high number of participants in 2023, the marathon and half marathon courses were changed for the 2024 event. Previously, the two courses were completely merged together; now, the event has separated its marathon and half marathon courses for several miles of the race.

== Other races ==
In addition to the main event, a half marathon, a marathon relay and a 5K race also take place.

=== Colorado Colfax Kids Marathon ===
The Colorado Colfax Kids Marathon was a race like the Colorado Colfax Marathon, established in 2006. The run was for Kindergarten to 8th grade students. It was a run that is only 1.2 miles (1.9 km). The students ran the other 25.2 miles (40.6 km) in training. The training lasted from February to early May. The race was usually planned to be held in the middle of May. The event was held at the Colorado Mills Mall. The students ran through a path in the parking lot around the mall area.

The race was replaced with the Kids Run America program before being cancelled altogether.

== Marathon winners ==
Year	Men's Winner	Men's Time	Women's Winner	Women's Time
2016	Patrick Rizzo (USA)	2:32:36	Heidy Lozano (USA)	3:10:41
2017	Ramon Paredes Becerra (MEX)	2:31:08	Brittany Lee (USA)	2:52:51
2018	Scott Dahlberg (USA)	2:36:51	Emily Van Meter (USA)	2:56:51
2019	Daniel Huben (USA)	2:31:34	Elizabeth Ehrhardt (USA)	2:55:59
2020	Virtual race due to COVID			
2021	Wesley Robinson (USA)	2:28:31	Gabbie McWilliams (USA)	3:03:07
2022	Tyler McCandless (USA)	2:21:08	Sarah Villasenor (USA)	3:02:52
2023	Jack Davidson (USA)	2:23:19	Shelly McDonald (USA)	2:54:12
2024	Fernando Cabada (USA)	2:30:14	Laurel Kruger (USA)	2:50:54
2025	Steven Goldy (USA)	2:24:20	Ansley Queen (USA)	2:57:08
2026	Alec Hornecker (USA)	2:27:56	Hali Hafeman (USA)	2:56:40
