= Colfax Theater =

- Formerly listed on the U.S. National Register of Historic Places
- Location within Indiana Location within the United States
- Location: 213 W. Colfax, South Bend, Indiana
- Area: less than one acre
- Built: 1928
- Architect: Christmnan, H.G., Co.
- MPS: Downtown South Bend Historic MRA
- NRHP reference No.: 85001208

Significant dates
- Added to NRHP: June 5, 1985
- Removed from NRHP: July 7, 1993

Colfax Theater was a historic theater building in South Bend, Indiana. It was built in 1928, and was a two-story, irregularly shaped brick building with a glazed terra cotta facade. The auditorium seated 2,000 patrons. The second story featured a multi-paned Palladian window. It was demolished in 1991 to accommodate an expansion of the neighboring South Bend Tribune.

It was listed on the National Register of Historic Places in 1985, and delisted in 1993.
