= Lincoln Peak (Washington) =

Mountain in Washington (state), United States

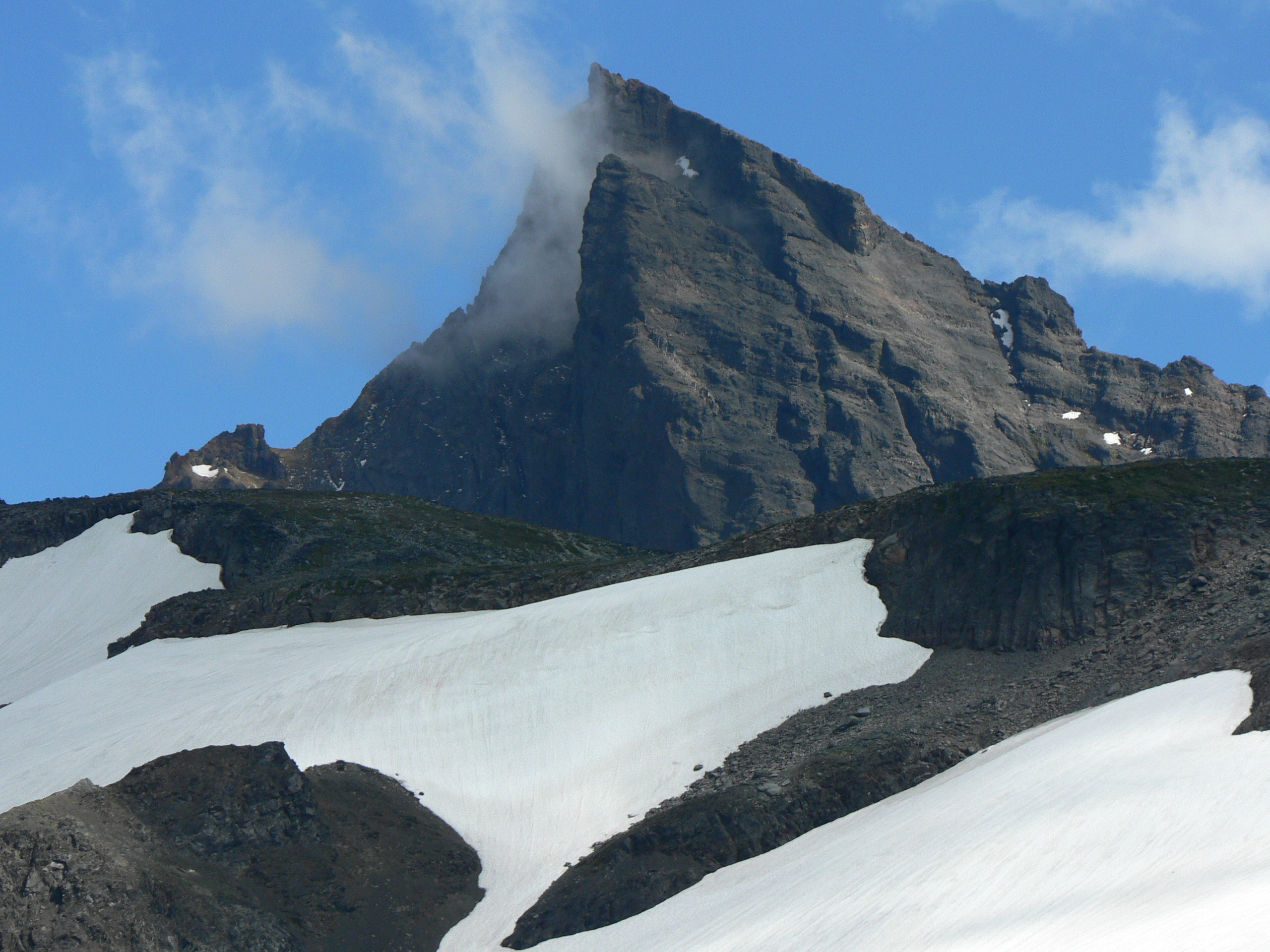
- Lincoln Peak looking east-southeast from Grouse Ridge

Highest point
- Elevation: 9,080+ ft (2,770+ m)
- Prominence: 720 ft (220 m)
- Isolation: 0.6 mi (1 km)
- Coordinates: 48°46′6″N 121°51′31″W

Geography
- Location within Washington (state)
- Location: Whatcom County, Washington, United States
- Parent range: Cascade Range
- Topo map: USGS Mount Baker quadrangle

Lincoln Peak is a tall peak subsidiary to Mount Baker in the Cascade Range in the U.S. state of Washington. It lies within the Mount Baker Wilderness and Mount Baker-Snoqualmie National Forest. At over 9,080 feet (2,770 m) in elevation it is the 16th-highest peak in Washington and 31st-highest in the Cascades, however Lincoln Peak's prominence is only 720 feet (220 m). The nearest higher peak is Colfax Peak, 0.6 miles (1 km) to the east-northeast. Lincoln, Colfax, and Seward Peaks are erosional remnants from a much older eruptive episode, with more recent volcanic activity resulting in the nearby cone of the Mount Baker volcano.

== See also ==
- List of mountains of the United States
- List of mountains by elevation
