= U.S. Route 169 in Kansas =

Segment of American highway

U.S. Highway 169
- US 169 highlighted in red

Route information
- Maintained by KDOT
- Length: 135.393 mi (217.894 km)

Major junctions
- South end: US 169 at the Oklahoma state line in South Coffeyville, OK
- US-166 in Coffeyville; US-160 by Cherryvale; US-400 northeast of Cherryvale; US-54 by Iola; US-59 south of Garnett; I-35 from Olathe to Merriam; I-35 in Kansas City; I-70 / US-24 / US-40 in Kansas City
- North end: I-70 / US 24 / US 40 / US 169 at the Missouri state line in Kansas City, MO

Location
- Country: United States
- State: Kansas
- Counties: Montgomery, Labette, Neosho, Allen, Anderson, Franklin, Miami, Johnson, Wyandotte

Highway system
- United States Numbered Highway System; List; Special; Divided; Kansas State Highway System; Interstate; US; State; Spurs
← K-168	→ K-170

U.S. Route 169 (US-169) is a major north–south U.S. Highway that runs from US-64 in Tulsa, Oklahoma, to US-53 near Virginia, Minnesota. In Kansas, the highway is a main north–south route that runs through the eastern end of the state from the Oklahoma border to Missouri border. Along the way US-169 intersects several major highways including US-400 by Cherryvale, US-54 by Iola, overlaps US-59 south of Garnett, overlaps I-35 from Olathe to Merriam, and in Kansas City begins an overlap with I-70, US-24 and US-40 which it follows into Missouri.

== Route description ==
US-169 enters the state at Coffeyville as a four-lane road and is a four-lane highway for about 8.8 miles (14.2 km) until the edge of the Coffeyville Industrial Park. A segment between Chanute and Iola is a freeway with fully controlled access with center concrete barrier, with two lanes in each direction. US-169 runs concurrently with US-59 and K-31 starting about five miles (8.0 km) south of Garnett and diverges northeast again immediately south of Garnett. At Osawatomie the road becomes a full freeway and runs concurrently with K-7. In southern Johnson County US-169 becomes an expressway until its junction with Interstate 35 (I-35) in Olathe.

From this point to the Missouri state line, US-169 alternates between freeways and surface streets. It follows I-35 to Shawnee Mission Parkway in Overland Park, then travels east to Rainbow Boulevard. US-169 then follows surface streets to its junction with I-70 near downtown Kansas City. US-169 and I-70 enter Missouri together just after crossing the Kansas River.

=== Transit ===
Jefferson Lines provides intercity bus service along the length of US-169 in Kansas serving Iola, Chanute and Coffeyville.

== History ==
K-269
- Location: Iola
- Length: 3.072 mi (4.944 km)
- Existed: June 30, 1980–October 31, 1999

In a June 30, 1980 resolution, US-169 and K-57 were realigned to run directly north–south through Iola. Also at this time, K-269 was first designated a state highway and ran from K-57 and US-169 north to US-54. In a September 20, 1991, resolution, it was proposed to realign K-57 and US-169 over K-269. The project was completed on October 31, 1999, and at that time, K-269 was decommissioned and became part of the new K-57 and US-169.

The intersection immediately south of Garnett used to be a braided intersection with stop and yield signs; it was identified as a high crash location in 2001, and was rebuilt as a roundabout that opened in April 2006. The Kansas Department of Transportation is rebuilding or planning to rebuild several other rural intersections as roundabouts for increased safety.

== Major intersections ==
County	Location	mi	km	Exit	Destinations	Notes
Montgomery	Parker Township	0.000	0.000		US 169 south – Tulsa	Continuation into Oklahoma
Montgomery	Coffeyville	2.371	3.816		US-166 west (11th Street)	Southern end of US-166 overlap
Montgomery	Coffeyville	4.615	7.427	—	US-166 east – Chetopa	Northern end of US-166 overlap
Montgomery	Drum Creek Township	16.065	25.854		US-160 east – Oswego	Southern end of US-160 overlap
Montgomery	Drum Creek Township	17.086	27.497		US-160 west – Independence	Northern end of US-160 overlap
Montgomery	Cherry Township	26.593	42.797	—	US-400 – Parsons, Wichita	
Labette	No major junctions					
Neosho	Chetopa Township	39.775	64.012		K-47 to US-59 – Fredonia	
Neosho	Chanute	48.440	77.957	—	35th Street	
Neosho	Chanute	50.935	81.972	—	K-39 (Cherry Street)	
Neosho	Tioga Township	53.612	86.280	—	Plummer Avenue	
Allen	Cottage Grove Township	55.720	89.673	—	Humboldt–Chanute Road	
Allen	Humboldt Township	59.920	96.432	—	Tank Farm Road	
Allen	Humboldt Township	61.922	99.654	—	Humboldt	Former K-224
Allen	Iola Township	67.232	108.199	—	Minnesota Road	Access to Allen County Airport; former US-169 Spur
Allen	Iola	69.305	111.536	—	US-54 – Iola, Fort Scott	
Anderson	Colony	80.449	129.470		K-58 west – LeRoy	Eastern terminus of K-58
Anderson	Welda–Washington township line	91.076	146.573		US-59 south / K-31 south – Moran	Southern end of US-59 and K-31 overlap
Anderson	Garnett	95.241	153.276		US-59 north / K-31 north / US 169 Bus. – Garnett	Roundabout; northern end of US-59 and K-31 overlap
Anderson	Garnett	97.246	156.502		US 169 Bus. (6th Avenue)	
Franklin	No major junctions					
Miami	Osawatomie Township	117.602	189.262	—	K-7 south – Mound City	Southern end of K-7 overlap
Miami	Osawatomie	87.576	140.940	—	Main Street	
Miami	Osawatomie	88.405	142.274	—	K-279 west / 343rd Street	Eastern terminus of K-279
Miami	Valley Township	91.181	146.742	—	327th Street, Old KC Road	
Miami	Paola	94.349	151.840	—	Baptiste Drive	
Miami	Marysville Township	98.219	158.068	—	K-68 – Louisburg, Ottawa	
Miami	Marysville Township	101.234	162.920	—	255th Street – Hillsdale	
Miami	Spring Hill	105.296	169.457	—	Spring Hill, Bucyrus	
Johnson	Olathe	114.803	184.758	215	I-35 south / US-50 west / US-56 west / K-7 north – Wichita	Northern end of K-7 overlap; southern end of I-35 / US-50 / US 56 overlaps
Johnson	Olathe	116.162	186.945	217	Old Highway 56	Southbound exit and northbound entrance
Johnson	Olathe	117.250	188.696	218	Santa Fe	
Johnson	Olathe	119.568	192.426	220	119th Street	
Johnson	Lenexa	121.792	196.005	222	I-435 / US-50 east to K-10 – Lawrence, Topeka	Northern end of US-50 concurrency; I-435 exit 83; exit signed as 222A (west) and 222B (east)
Johnson	Lenexa	123.231	198.321	224	95th Street	Diverging diamond interchange
Johnson	Lenexa	124.481	200.333	225A	87th Street	
Johnson	Lenexa	124.940	201.071	225B	US-69 south (Overland Parkway)	Southern end of US-69 concurrency; southbound exit and northbound entrance only
Johnson	Merriam	126.369	203.371	227	75th Street	Signed as exit 225C northbound
Johnson	Merriam	127.417	205.058	228A	67th Street	
Johnson	Merriam	127.862	205.774	228B	I-35 north – Des Moines	Northern end of I-35 concurrency
Johnson	Overland Park–Mission line	128.727	207.166	—	US-69 north (Metcalf Avenue)	Northern end of US-69 overlap
Johnson	Mission Woods–Westwood line	132.723	213.597		US-56 east (Shawnee Mission Parkway)	Northern end of US-56 overlap
Wyandotte	Kansas City	131.527	211.672		I-35 – Wichita	
Wyandotte	Kansas City	133.227	214.408	422	Kansas Turnpike west / I-70 west / US-24 west / US-40 west / US-69 – Topeka	Southern end of I-70 / US-24 / US-40 overlaps
Wyandotte	Kansas City	133.606	215.018	422C	Pacific Avenue	
Wyandotte	Kansas City	133.918	215.520	422D	Central Avenue	
Wyandotte	Kansas City	134.269– 134.816	216.085– 216.965	423A	5th Street	Eastbound exit and westbound entrance
Wyandotte	Kansas City	134.269– 134.816	216.085– 216.965	423B	James Street / 3rd Street	Eastbound exit and westbound entrance
Wyandotte	Kansas City	134.269– 134.816	216.085– 216.965	423C	Minnesota Avenue / Washington Boulevard	Westbound exit and eastbound entrance
Wyandotte	Kansas City	134.269– 134.816	216.085– 216.965	423D	Fairfax District	Westbound exit and eastbound entrance
Wyandotte	Kansas City	135.393	217.894		I-70 east / US 24 east / US 40 east / US 169 north – Kansas City	Continuation into Missouri
1.000 mi = 1.609 km; 1.000 km = 0.621 mi: Concurrency terminus; Incomplete access

== Garnett business route ==
U.S. Highway 169 Business
- Location: Garnett, Kansas

U.S. 169 has one special route while in Kansas, Business Route 169. The business route northern terminus is the junction of U.S. 169 & 6th Avenue in Garnett. The main highway bypasses the town to the Southeast. The business route travels along 6th Avenue until reaching Maple Street where it intersects with U.S. 59 and K-31 until it ends at its intersection with U.S. 169 at a roundabout South of Garnett in Anderson County, Kansas.
