= Canville Creek =

Stream in Neosho and Allen County, Kansas, U.S.

Coordinates: 37°33′44″N 95°17′53″W

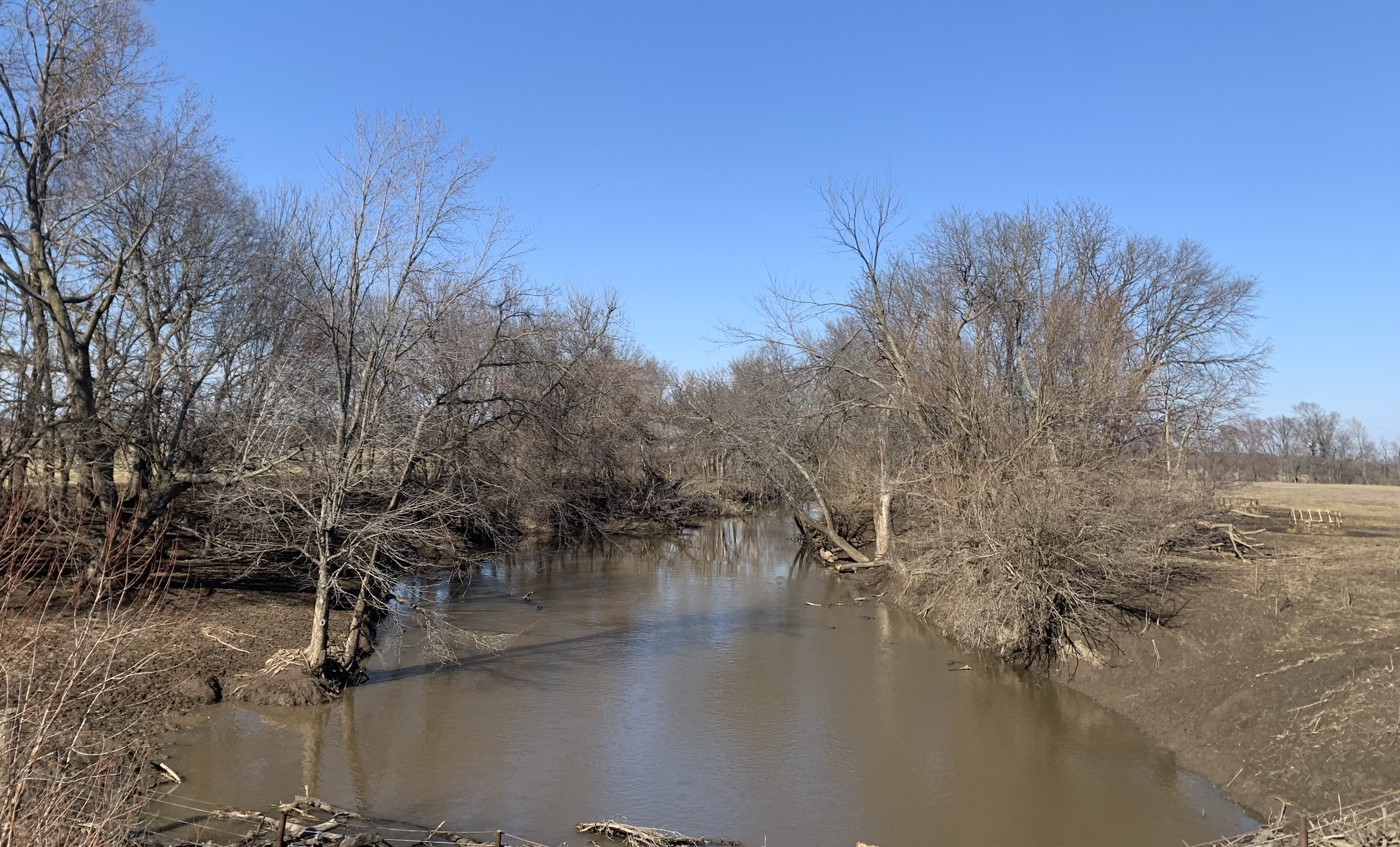
Canville Creek at 160th Road east of Shaw, Kansas

Canville Creek is a stream in Neosho County, Kansas and Allen County, Kansas, in the United States.

Canville Creek was named for A. B. Canville, who settled near its banks in 1847.

== See also ==
- List of rivers of Kansas
