= Scott Township, Bourbon County, Kansas =

Scott Township
- Township
- Location in Bourbon County
- Coordinates: 37°50′04″N 094°41′06″W
- Country: United States
- State: Kansas
- County: Bourbon

Area
  - Total: 69.95 sq mi (181.18 km^{2})
  - Land: 69.30 sq mi (179.48 km^{2})
  - Water: 0.66 sq mi (1.7 km^{2}) 0.94%
- Elevation: 925 ft (282 m)

Population (2000)
  - Total: 2,326
  - Density: 34/sq mi (13/km^{2})
- GNIS feature ID: 0474564

Scott Township is a township in Bourbon County, Kansas, United States. As of the 2000 census, its population was 2,326.

== Geography ==
Scott Township covers an area of 69.95 square miles (181.2 km^{2}) surrounding the incorporated city of Fort Scott. According to the USGS, it contains seven cemeteries: Clarksburg, Evergreen, Lath Branch, Mayberry, Oak Grove, Saint Marys and Union Center.

The streams of Hickory Creek, Lath Branch, Rock Creek and Wolverine Creek run through this township.
