= Colfax Township, Cloud County, Kansas =

Colfax Township
- Township
- Location in Cloud County
- Coordinates: 39°26′30″N 097°25′31″W
- Country: United States
- State: Kansas
- County: Cloud

Area
  - Total: 35.78 sq mi (92.66 km^{2})
  - Land: 35.76 sq mi (92.61 km^{2})
  - Water: 0.019 sq mi (0.05 km^{2}) 0.05%
- Elevation: 1,410 ft (430 m)

Population (2020)
  - Total: 55
  - Density: 1.5/sq mi (0.59/km^{2})
- GNIS feature ID: 0476008

Colfax Township is a township in Cloud County, Kansas, United States. As of the 2020 census, its population was 55.

== History ==
Colfax Township was organized in 1872 and was named after Vice President Schuyler Colfax.

== Geography ==
Colfax Township covers an area of 35.78 square miles (92.7 km^{2}) and contains no incorporated settlements.
