= Colfax Township, Oceana County, Michigan =

Colfax Township, Michigan
- Township
- Location within the state of Michigan Colfax Township, Michigan (the United States)
- Coordinates: 43°45′32″N 86°5′34″W
- Country: United States
- State: Michigan
- County: Oceana

Area
  - Total: 35.9 sq mi (93.1 km^{2})
  - Land: 35.4 sq mi (91.6 km^{2})
  - Water: 0.54 sq mi (1.4 km^{2})
- Elevation: 892 ft (272 m)

Population (2020)
  - Total: 446
  - Density: 12.6/sq mi (4.87/km^{2})
- Time zone: UTC-5 (Eastern (EST))
  - Summer (DST): UTC-4 (EDT)
- FIPS code: 26-17180
- GNIS feature ID: 1626114
- Website: https://colfaxtownshipoceana.org/

Colfax Township is a civil township of Oceana County in the U.S. state of Michigan. The population was 446 at the 2020 census.

The township was organized in 1869.

== Geography ==
According to the United States Census Bureau, the township has a total area of 35.9 square miles (93 km^{2}), of which, 35.4 square miles (92 km^{2}) of it is land and 0.6 square miles (1.6 km^{2}) of it (1.56%) is water.

== Demographics ==
As of the census of 2000, there were 574 people, 192 households, and 134 families residing in the township. The population density was 16.2 inhabitants per square mile (6.3/km^{2}). There were 596 housing units at an average density of 16.8 per square mile (6.5/km^{2}). The racial makeup of the township was 82.58% White, 0.35% African American, 0.70% Native American, 0.17% Asian, 15.33% from other races, and 0.87% from two or more races. Hispanic or Latino of any race were 20.73% of the population.

There were 192 households, out of which 26.6% had children under the age of 18 living with them, 59.4% were married couples living together, 6.3% had a female householder with no husband present, and 29.7% were non-families. 26.0% of all households were made up of individuals, and 7.3% had someone living alone who was 65 years of age or older. The average household size was 2.63 and the average family size was 3.04.

In the township the population was spread out, with 33.4% under the age of 18, 7.1% from 18 to 24, 23.0% from 25 to 44, 24.4% from 45 to 64, and 12.0% who were 65 years of age or older. The median age was 33 years. For every 100 females, there were 120.8 males. For every 100 females age 18 and over, there were 109.9 males.

The median income for a household in the township was $30,417, and the median income for a family was $36,563. Males had a median income of $35,000 versus $25,000 for females. The per capita income for the township was $11,986. About 19.6% of families and 26.9% of the population were below the poverty line, including 38.5% of those under age 18 and 21.9% of those age 65 or over.
