= Colfax Township, Marion County, Kansas =

Colfax Township Marion County, Kansas
- Township
- Location within Marion County

- Location within the state of Kansas
- Coordinates: 38.5657039°N 97.0957761°W
- Country: United States
- State: Kansas
- County: Marion

Area
  - Total: 36 sq mi (93 km^{2})

Dimensions
  - Length: 6.0 mi (9.7 km)
  - Width: 6.0 mi (9.7 km)
- Elevation: 1,460 ft (450 m)

Population (2020)
  - Total: 172
  - Density: 4.8/sq mi (1.8/km^{2})
- Time zone: UTC-6 (CST)
  - Summer (DST): UTC-5 (CDT)
- Area code: 620
- FIPS code: 20-14800
- GNIS ID: 477128
- Website: County website

Colfax Township is a township in Marion County, Kansas, United States. As of the 2020 census, the township population was 172, including the city of Ramona.

== Geography ==
Colfax Township covers an area of 36 square miles (93.2 km^{2}).

== Communities ==
The township contains the following settlements:

- City of Ramona.

== Cemeteries ==
The township contains the following cemeteries:

- Lewis Cemetery, located in Section 2 T17S R3E.
- Lutheran Church Cemetery, located in Section 19 T17S R3E.
- Mohn Cemetery (aka Tampa Mennonite Cemetery), located in Section 32 T17S R3E.
- St. Johns Lutheran Church Cemetery (aka North Tampa Cemetery), located in Section 6 T17S R3E.
- St. Mary's Catholic Church Cemetery, located in Section 19 T17S R3E.
