= Pleasant Valley Township, Wilson County, Kansas =

Township in Wilson County, Kansas

Coordinates: 37.603°N 95.591°W

Pleasant Valley Township is a township in Wilson County, Kansas, United States.

== History ==
Pleasant Valley Township was established in 1870.
