= Chetopa Township, Wilson County, Kansas =

Township in Wilson County, Kansas, U.S.

Coordinates: 37.50°N 95.58°W

Chetopa Township is a township in Wilson County, Kansas, United States.

== History ==
Chetopa Township was established in 1870. It was named for Chief Chetopa, an Osage Indian chief.
