= Newark Township, Kansas =

Township in Wilson County, Kansas, U.S.

Coordinates: 37.438°N 95.582°W

Newark Township is a township in Wilson County, Kansas, United States.

== History ==
Newark Township was established in 1871. It was named after Newark, Ohio.
