= Colfax Township, Wilson County, Kansas =

Township in Kansas, United States

Colfax Township
- Township
- Interactive map of Colfax Township
- Coordinates: 37.6897°N 95.5975°W
- Country: United States
- State: Kansas
- County: Wilson
- Established: 1870
- Named for: Schuyler Colfax
- Time zone: UTC-6 (CST)
  - Summer (DST): UTC-5 (CDT)

Colfax Township is a township in Wilson County, Kansas, United States.

== History ==
Colfax Township was established in 1870. It was named for Schuyler Colfax.
