= Tornado outbreak sequence of May 3–11, 2003 =

- Animation of confirmed tornadoes and tornado warnings from 21:00 UTC April 30–19:00 UTC May 11, 2003

Meteorological history
- Duration: May 3–11, 2003

Tornado outbreak
- Tornadoes: 363 confirmed
- Max. rating: F4 tornado
- Duration: 7 days, 22 hours
- Highest winds: Tornadic – 207–260 mph (333–418 km/h) in Franklin, Kansas
- Highest gusts: Non-tornadic – 115 mph (185 km/h) in Wayne County, Kentucky

Overall effects
- Fatalities: 42 (+9 non-tornadic)
- Injuries: 652 injuries (+52 non-tornadic)
- Damage: $4.1 billion (2003 USD)
- Areas affected: Great Plains, Eastern United States
- Part of the Tornadoes of 2003

From May 3 to May 11, 2003, a prolonged and destructive series of tornado outbreaks affected much of the Great Plains and Eastern United States. Most of the severe activity was concentrated between May 4 and May 10, which saw more tornadoes than any other week-long span in recorded history; 335 tornadoes occurred during this period, concentrated in the Ozarks and central Mississippi River Valley. Additional tornadoes were produced by the same storm systems from May 3 to May 11, producing 363 tornadoes overall, of which 62 were significant. (Note: A significant tornado is one that is rated F2 or higher on the Fujita scale.) Six of the tornadoes were rated F4, and of these four occurred on May 4, the most prolific day of the tornado outbreak sequence; these were the outbreak's strongest tornadoes.

At least one significant tornado was reported daily across nine consecutive days, with at least a dozen tornadoes total occurring daily over the same timeframe. Due to the temporal expanse of the event, it was classified as a tornado outbreak sequence—a "continuous or near-continuous sequence of tornado outbreak days"—with only three historical events of comparable longevity and severity according to data compiled by Thomas P. Grazulis. May 2003 ultimately became the most active month for tornadoes in recorded history until it was later surpassed by April 2011.

Damage caused by the severe weather and associated flooding amounted to US$4.1 billion (US$5.8 billion in 2016), making it the costliest U.S. tornado outbreak of the 2000s. A total of 50 deaths and 713 injuries were caused by the severe weather, with a majority caused by tornadoes; the deadliest tornado was an F4 that struck Madison and Henderson counties in Tennessee, killing 11. In 2023, tornado expert Thomas P. Grazulis created the outbreak intensity score (OIS) as a way to rank various tornado outbreaks. The tornado outbreak sequence of May 2003 received an OIS of 232, making it the fifth worst tornado outbreak in recorded history.

== Meteorological synopsis ==
=== Overview ===
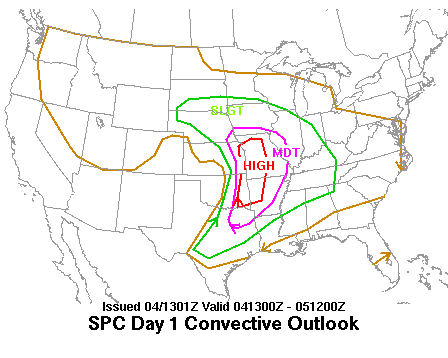
The Storm Prediction Center's convective outlook for May 4 highlighting the regions with the greatest likelihood of severe weather. This day proved to be the most active and deadly of the event with 81 tornadoes and 38 fatalities.

During the first half of May 2003, atmospheric conditions across the Central and Southeastern United States proved exceptionally favorable for widespread severe weather. Idealized patterns for large tornado outbreaks occurred each day from May 3 to 11, resulting in a prolonged and extensive series of outbreaks. Warm, moist air flowed northward from the Gulf of Mexico across the Central United States and reached as far north as Missouri. This created an anomalously large warm sector–the airmass behind a warm front and ahead of a dry line–for thunderstorms to develop within. The unusually far-reaching nature of this airmass resulted in the greatest tornadic activity occurring outside the climatological maximum area for tornadoes in May. Atop the northward surface winds, the upper-level jet stream blew almost perpendicular, creating strong wind shear across Kansas, Missouri, Oklahoma, and Tennessee. Multiple shortwave troughs initiated tornadic events throughout the outbreak. As severe weather shifted east across the country, another trough would cross from the Pacific to the Central United States and reignite activity. The cause of these successive troughs is unknown, but they proved a key factor in the prolonged nature of the outbreak. Throughout this period, no cold fronts propagated south from Canada; the lack of these allowed the atmosphere to continually destabilize and fuel further thunderstorms. The pattern finally ceased on May 11–12 with the active pattern shifting to New England the formation of a ridge over the Rocky Mountains.

Throughout the nine-day outbreak, 363 tornadoes touched down across the United States. Of these, 62 reached at least F2-intensity, while 6 reached F4. The most prolific and violent day of the outbreak was May 4; 79 tornadoes touched down, of which 4 reached F4-intensity. Between May 4 and May 10, 335 tornadoes developed across 26 states, setting a record for the most tornadoes ever documented over the course of a week. In total, the widespread severe weather event caused an estimated $4.1 billion (2003; $5.8 billion 2019 CPI-adjusted) in damage and 41 deaths alongside 642 injuries.

=== May 3 ===
On April 30, meteorologists at the Storm Prediction Center (SPC) noted the likelihood of a major tornado outbreak across a large area of the Central and Eastern United States for the period of May 2–6. Ahead of the most active day, the SPC issued a rare high-risk outlook for severe weather across eastern Oklahoma, eastern Kansas, western Missouri, and northwestern Arkansas. A total of 127 severe weather watches and 4,050 warnings (2,960 severe thunderstorm and 1,090 tornado) were issued from May 4. Of the watches, 25 were classified as Particularly Dangerous Situations, a type of watch reserved for the most life-threatening events. The issuance of such watches resulted in an average lead-time of 2 hours and 3 minutes for fatal tornadoes. Seven of the eight fatal tornadoes occurred within a high-risk outlook area, with the eighth just outside in a moderate-risk area. An average of 12 watches were issued each day; May 6, 8, and 10 saw more than 20 each. Watches were continuously in effect from 16:40 UTC on May 4 through 12:00 UTC on May 9. May 6 saw the greatest number of advisories with a record 921 warnings. The SPC and the National Weather Services offices in Kansas City, Springfield, Memphis, Paducah, and Oklahoma City received a letter of praise signed by 11 members of the United States House Committee on Science, Space, and Technology commending their high-quality service during the event. Furthermore, the SPC webpage received an average of 5.6 million views per day during the outbreak.

Radar animation of a supercell that produced at least four tornadoes in Haskell County, Texas, on May 3

On the morning of May 3, the SPC predicted that a trough would intensify over the eastern U.S., resulting in a wide and expanding area of increased wind shear and atmospheric instability across the southeastern U.S. Strong southerly winds in the lower levels of the troposphere over the central Great Plains were also expected to advect warm and moist air into the Great Plains. These factors were forecast to provide a conducive environment for severe weather across much of the U.S.; the SPC would delineate moderate risks (Note: The Storm Prediction Center used a three-tier scale in their convective outlooks to categorize the coverage and intensity of severe weather, with slight (SLGT) risk having the lowest coverage and severity, followed my moderate (MDT) and high (HIGH) with the highest coverage and severity. All risks imply that well-organized severe thunderstorms are anticipated.) for severe weather in parts of the central Great Plains, Red River region, and southeastern U.S. over the course of the day, with a lesser but nonetheless extant expectation of severe weather extending outwards from the focal areas. The first severe watch on May 3 was a severe thunderstorm watch issued for parts of the Gulf Coast at 14:14 UTC (9:14 a.m. CDT) in connection with a mesoscale convective system that had been tracking southeast over eastern Mississippi and western Alabama during the morning. The outflow from this complex of storms was expected to also trigger additional severe thunderstorms within an environment favorable for large hail and strong winds near the Gulf Coast. However, the SPC noted that the day's most conducive environment of severe weather—conditional on the development of storms—lay farther west over the southern Great Plains along a decaying warm front and a dry line.

The SPC issued a tornado watch at 18:15 UTC (1:15 p.m. CDT) for parts of Arkansas, Louisiana, Oklahoma, and Texas. Although an atmospheric sounding from Fort Worth, Texas, showed the presence of a capping inversion that prevented storm development, sufficient daytime heating could initiate storms that could develop in the otherwise favorable conditions for severe weather in place. By 21:00 UTC (4:00 p.m. CDT), a line of towering cumulus and cumulonimbus clouds emerged along the dry line east of Lubbock, Texas, resulting in a focused threat area for large hail, strong wind gusts, and isolated tornadoes in southwestern Oklahoma and northwestern Texas. Concurrently, decreasing air pressures, steepening lapse rates, and increasing moisture resulted in another conducive area for severe weather over the central Great Plains and along the eastern periphery of the Rocky Mountains. A tornado watch was issued for northeastern Colorado and northwestern Nebraska in response to this emergent favorability for severe weather at 22:10 UTC (5:10 p.m. CDT).

By 01:00 UTC (8:00 p.m. CDT), severe thunderstorms were active over the Oklahoma/Texas region and the Dakotas/Nebraska area. The final tornado watch of the day was issued for western Oklahoma and northwestern Texas at 01:05 UTC (8:05 p.m. CDT) and expired at 07:00 UTC (2:00 a.m. CDT). Tornadoes were reported in Mississippi, Nebraska, South Dakota, and Texas throughout the day; there were 18 tornado reports, though only 14 tornadoes were confirmed. Although the SPC received its first tornado report at 21:17 UTC (4:17 p.m. CDT) from Meade County, South Dakota, the first confirmed tornado was an F0 tornado that touched down at 21:41 UTC (4:41 p.m. CDT) near Minatare in Scotts Bluff County, Nebraska. The strongest tornado of the day was an F2 tornado that touched down near Lake Stamford in Texas at around 00:10 UTC (7:00 p.m. CDT). The tornado originated from an isolated supercell thunderstorm that had developed along the dry line in northwestern Texas; the same thunderstorm produced at least three other tornadoes during its two-hour traversal of Haskell County, Texas.

=== May 4 ===
Radar imagery of a storms moving through the Kansas City area on May 4.

May 4 was the most active day of the tornado outbreak sequence: the SPC received 94 tornado reports, though surveys and reanalyses confirmed 79 tornadoes. At the time, this was the second largest number of tornadoes in the U.S. in a single day on record, behind only April 3, 1974. The 38 tornadoes confirmed in Missouri was the highest single-day total for the state and were more numerous than any previous month on record. The day's severe weather was largely driven by a powerful mid-tropospheric disturbance moving northeast across the central and northern Great Plains in tandem with an unusually strong area of low pressure over northeastern Kansas. These weather features were also positioned beneath a negatively-tilted trough and an anomalously robust portion of a jet stream. A cold front and dry line were located south and southwest of the low-pressure area while a warm front spanned from the system southeast to the Tennessee Valley.

This atmospheric setup was highly conducive for tornadogenesis, and accordingly the potential for a major tornado outbreak was forecast well in advance. The National Weather Service office in Pleasant Hill, Missouri, noted the potential for severe weather on May 4 as early as April 28. In their Day 2 Convective Outlook, issued on May 3, the SPC indicated that the eastern fringes of the southern Great Plains and the lower and central Mississippi Valley had a moderate risk of experiencing severe weather on May 4. At 13:00 UTC (8:00 a.m. CDT) on May 4, the agency noted a high risk of severe weather for parts of Arkansas, Kansas, Missouri, and Oklahoma, predicting a "significant severe thunderstorm event" and the potential for "long-track and violent tornadoes" within the high risk region. Additionally, areas within this region had at least 25 percent chance of experiencing a nearby tornado and at least a 10 percent change of experiencing a nearby significant tornado. The SPC cited the confluence of high instability (characterized by convective available potential energy [CAPE] values between 2000 and 4000 J/kg) and strong wind shear as factors contributing to the anticipated tornado outbreak.

By around 15:00 UTC (10:00 a.m. CDT), the conducive conditions for severe weather projected in computer forecast models had begun to come to fruition. An area of low pressure centered south of Hastings, Nebraska, was intensifying amid strengthening winds aloft. A dry line extended south of the cyclone over areas east of Dodge City, Kansas. A warm front also extended outwards from the low pressure system towards Topeka, Kansas, and Joplin, Missouri. Behind the front, dew points exceeded 60 °F (16 °C). The warm front moved north as the day progressed, bringing along with it the warm and moist maritime tropical air mass. The SPC expected that both the warm front and the dry line would serve as a focus for storm development as the storm system evolved. The rapid development of storms just north of the low pressure system and the increasingly conducive conditions available to these storms led the SPC to issue their first tornado watch of the day at 16:40 UTC (11:40 a.m. CDT) for parts of northeastern Kansas and south-central and southeastern Nebraska. Roughly an hour later, additional tornado watches—all classified as Particularly Dangerous Situations—were issued for parts of Arkansas, Iowa, Kansas, Missouri, Nebraska, and Oklahoma ahead of an emerging line of towering cumulus and cumulonimbus clouds spanning from southeastern Nebraska to northeastern Kansas. As the low pressure system intensified—its central pressure falling 6.6 mbar (6.6 hPa; 0.19 inHg) in 2 hours—conditions continued to become more favorable for the formation of strong tornadoes.

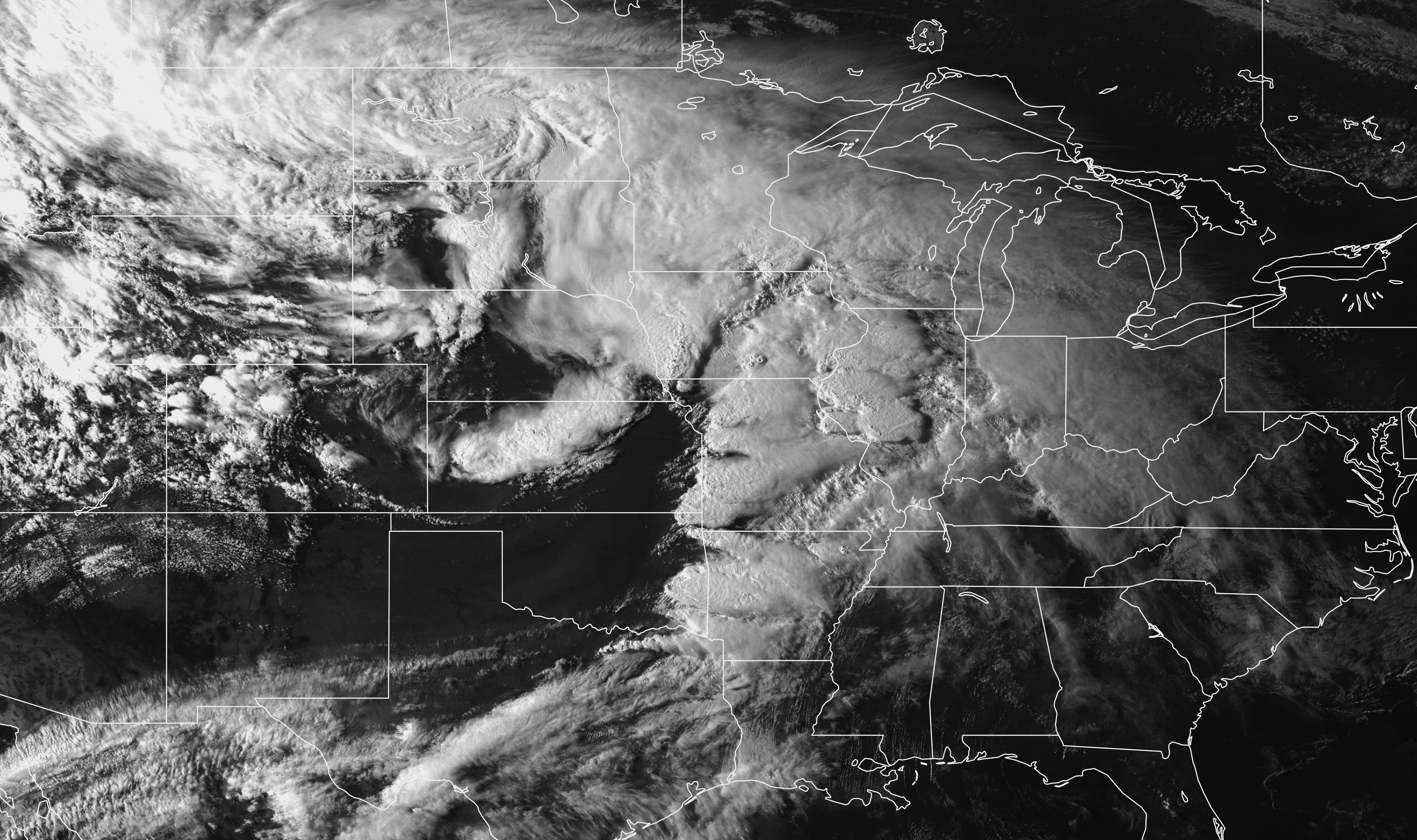
Storms over the Ozarks and Mississippi Valley on May 4 at 4:40 p.m. CST (22:40 UTC)

The day's first tornado was a brief F0 landspout that touched down in Scott County, Kansas, at 19:59 UTC (2:59 p.m. CDT). A line of thunderstorms developed over northeastern Kansas after 19:30 UTC (2:30 p.m. CDT) and later produced nine tornadoes in northeastern Kansas and northwestern Kansas. Four of these tornadoes touched down in the Kansas City, Missouri, area, including two F4 tornadoes. Concurrently, additional tornadic storms developed along the dry line in southeastern Kansas during the afternoon. These storms produced an F4 tornado and an F3 tornado that tracked for 85 mi (137 km), impacting Jericho Springs, Missouri, and Stockton, Missouri. The diminishing of the capping inversion along the dry line that had prevented storm development earlier in the day led the SPC to issue a tornado watch at 20:00 UTC (3:00 p.m. CDT) for south-central and southeastern Oklahoma and north-central and northeast Texas. One supercell developed over northeastern Oklahoma and moved into southwestern Missouri, producing an F3 tornado that struck Pierce City, Missouri.

Conditions within the preexisting risk areas remained favorable for tornadoes into the evening while the tornadic risk increased farther east, prompting the SPC to issue a tornado watch for new areas of Arkansas, Kentucky, Mississippi, Missouri, and Tennessee at 23:55 UTC (6:55 p.m. CDT). Tornadoes developed over Arkansas during the afternoon and evening of May 4, including two tornadoes with 35-and-42-mile (56 and 68 km) path lengths. At 01:00 UTC (8:00 p.m. CDT), the SPC indicated a high risk for severe weather for parts of Arkansas, Missouri, and Tennessee as the tornado outbreak remained in progress and tornado-producing supercells persisted into the overnight hours, outlining that "a dangerous tornado situation [was] developing along the warm front" between northeastern Arkansas and western Tennessee and that any developing storms would rapidly assume supercell characteristics. Southerly winds had continued to bring tropical air into the region, raising surface temperatures to near 80 °F (27 °C) and bringing dew points above 70 °F (21 °C) by 03:00 UTC (10:00 p.m. CDT). Storms that had initially formed over northeastern Arkansas and the Missouri Bootheel at around 22:00 UTC (5:00 p.m. CDT) quickly strengthened and acquired supercell characteristics; some of these storms entered western Tennessee by 02:00 UTC (9:00 p.m. CDT), producing tornadoes and damaging winds and hail. Over the next two hours, the morphology of these storms varied between a unified squall line with embedded rotation or a set of discrete supercells. One of the storms encountered highly conducive conditions and produced an F4 tornado near Denmark, Tennessee, that later tore through Jackson, Tennessee.

=== May 5 ===
The atmospheric environment continued to remain conducive for tornadoes well into the night of May 4–5. Tornado watches were issued and remained in effect for various parts of Alabama, Arkansas, Illinois, Indiana, Kentucky, Mississippi, Missouri, North Carolina, Oklahoma, and Tennessee during the early morning hours of May 5 as conditions supported both the persistence of preexisting supercell thunderstorms and the development of new storms. Radar imagery indicated that the threat for severe weather had begun to diminish by around 09:00 UTC (4:00 a.m. CDT). Nonetheless, the potential for isolated tornadoes continued through the night in connection with a cluster supercell thunderstorms over Middle Tennessee. The SPC predicted May 5 would be another active day for severe weather, projecting a Moderate Risk of severe weather a day in advance before projecting a High Risk at 16:30 UTC (11:30 a.m. CDT) on May 5 for areas surrounding the border between Arkansas and Louisiana; the anticipated overlap of 50–55 kn (58–63 mph; 93–102 km/h) wind shear and CAPE exceeding 3000 J/kg was cited as contributing factors to the day's anticipated supercell development and consequential high risk for severe weather. The forecast high risk region was later shifted towards the Tennessee Valley following the increase of air divergence and the persistence of wind shear and atmospheric instability in that area. The principal weather features on May 5 included a longwave trough centered over the western U.S., a powerful upper-tropospheric trough over the Mississippi Valley, and a cyclone over Iowa tracking northeastwards towards Wisconsin, with the most significant weather expected to coincide with an area of steep lapse rates.

Three F0 tornadoes were reported in northern Mississippi between 12:55–13:55 UTC (7:55–8:55 a.m. CDT). Despite an initial weakening of thunderstorms over western Tennessee during the morning of May 5, the overarching airmass remained unstable and supportive of tornado formation. Supercell thunderstorms formed over the state within this environment by 16:00 UTC (9:00 .a.m. CDT) as temperatures rose above 80 °F (27 °C) and dew points eclipsed 70 °F (21 °C). Eight confirmed tornadoes touched down in Tennessee between 14 and 22 UTC (9 a.m. CDT). One of these tornadoes produced F3-rated damage near Belleville, Tennessee, and was ultimately the day's strongest tornado. The presence of very cold air in the middle and upper levels of the troposphere facilitated another locally favorable environment for severe thunderstorms over southern and eastern Michigan after about 21:00 UTC (5:00 p.m. EDT). Some thunderstorms formed in tandem with a lake breeze from Lake Michigan and then moved along a warm front, producing hail, damaging winds, and several funnel clouds, particularly near the front where wind shear was maximized. The complex of thunderstorms also produced an F1 tornado in Oakland County.

At around 15:00 UTC (10:00 a.m. CDT), thunderstorms began to form east-southeast of Dallas, Texas, amid a region with a weak capping inversion. Due to the favorable environment downwind, the SPC assessed the likely emergence of tornadic supercells as these storms moved towards the Ark-La-Tex region and accordingly issued a tornado watch for the area. However, no tornadoes were reported in Arkansas, Louisiana, or Texas during the day. Despite otherwise supportive conditions for tornadogenesis, rawinsondes launched at 18:00 UTC (1:00 p.m. CDT) suggested that the capping inversion remained in place within the SPC's High Risk region, suppressing the development of storms. Farther east, a mesoscale convective system formed over Mississippi during the evening within an energetic environment supportive of strong updrafts; however, the cluster of thunderstorms weakened after 03:00 UTC (10:00 p.m. CDT) as air pressures increased, resulting in a diminished threat for severe weather. The SPC no longer depicted a high risk of severe weather in their 01:00 UTC (8:00 p.m. CDT) convective outlook, showing at most a moderate risk for severe weather for northern Mississippi and surrounding areas. Overnight, a front extending from eastern Michigan to eastern Oklahoma and an outflow boundary extending from southeastern Arkansas towards Georgia were the primary foci for thunderstorm growth.

=== May 6 ===
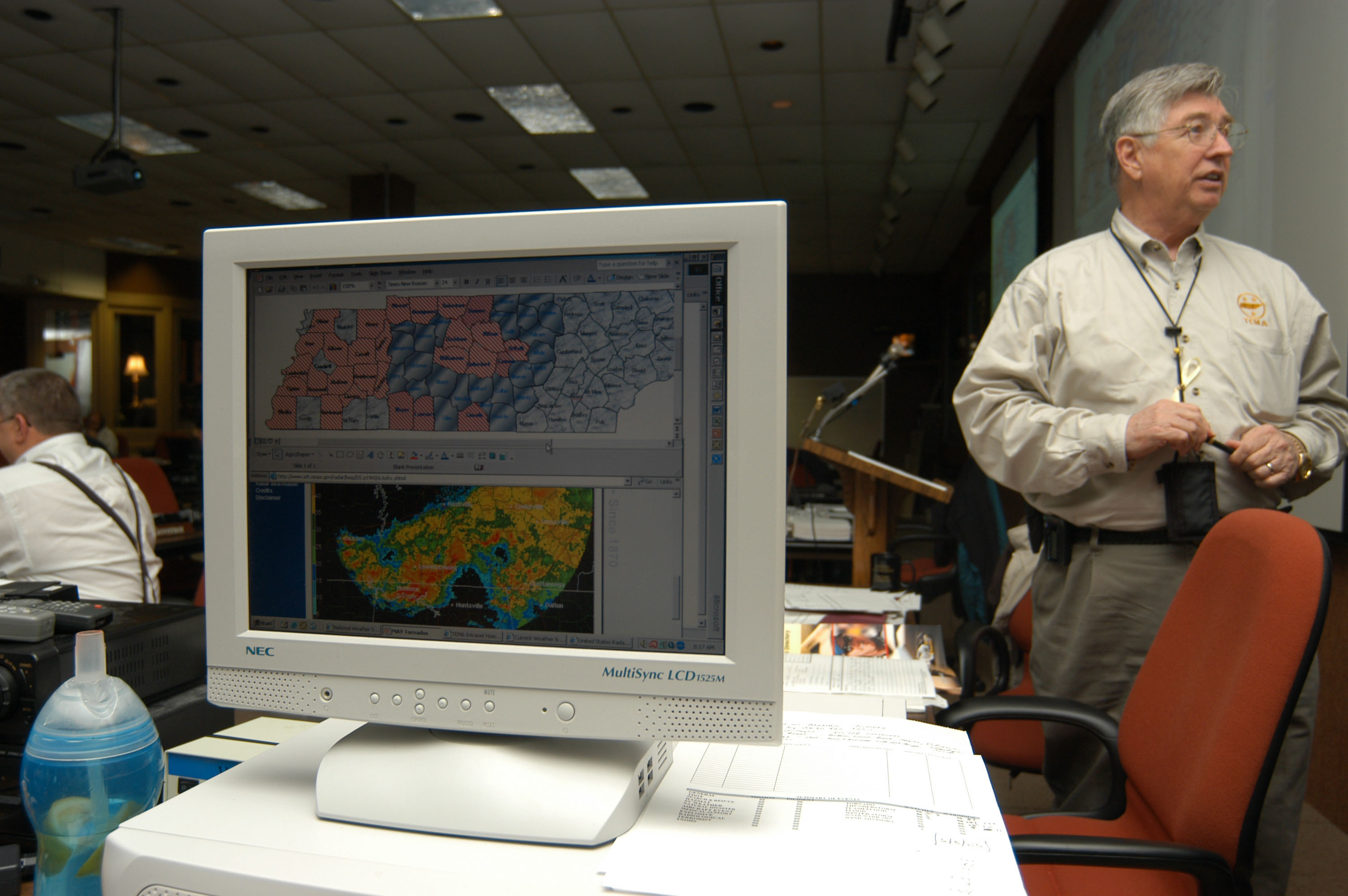
The Tennessee Emergency Operations Center on May 6

At 06:00 UTC (1:00 a.m. CDT) on May 6, the SPC projected a Moderate Risk of severe weather centered on the Ozarks, where dew points above 70 °F (21 °C) and steep lapse rates were expected to foment a highly unstable atmosphere ahead of a rapidly developing low-pressure area and its associated cold front and dry line. Warm temperatures throughout the eastern U.S. were also forecast to contribute to a Slight Risk of severe weather across parts of the Southeastern U.S. and the Mid-Atlantic states. Winds in the mid-levels of the troposphere were similar to the situation on May 4, shaped once again by a strong storm system over the central and northern Great Plains and the overlap of fast southwesterly winds at altitude with moist air below. The persistence of 70 kn (81 mph; 130 km/h) winds in the mid-levels of the troposphere—resulting in strong wind shear—led to a maintained risk for tornadoes along an outflow boundary near the Tennessee Valley and along a warm front draped over Georgia and the Carolinas during the early morning hours of May 6. A line of severe thunderstorms with a bow echo apparent on weather radar moved east across northern Georgia and the Carolinas during this period; two F1 tornadoes and an F0 tornado were confirmed over central South Carolina.

A second large complex of thunderstorms persisted over Middle Tennessee, northern Mississippi, and northern Alabama during the pre-dawn hours, with the unstable atmosphere and high wind shear creating an attendant risk for supercells, tornadoes, and heavy rain. Among these was a high-precipitation supercell that developed near the warm front in northern Alabama and produced several tornadoes. Ten tornadoes—all rated either F0 or F1—occurred in northern Alabama near the state border with Tennessee between 11 and 16 UTC (6-11 a.m. CDT) amid increasing wind shear. Additional severe thunderstorms in the morning became active over southern Illinois, eastern Kansas, western Missouri, Central Texas, during the period. At around 17:00 UTC (1:00 p.m. EDT), a line of storms exhibiting rotation on weather radar moved into northern Georgia, approaching an area where wind shear favored an isolated tornado threat. Over the next two hours, six tornadoes occurred near the Georgia–South Carolina border, of which the strongest was an F2 tornado that tracked across Madison and Elbert counties in Georgia.

Temperatures along a front in Oklahoma had risen to near 80 °F (27 °C) by 15:00 UTC (10:00 a.m. CDT), producing a highly unstable atmosphere marked by CAPE values ranging between 3000 and 4000 J/kg and lapse rates of around 8.5 °C/km. A broad area of rising air and an unstable atmosphere was also present to the north over eastern Kansas and western Missouri. By 20:00 UTC (3:00 p.m. CDT), a supercell was approaching Jefferson City and Columbia in Missouri while cumulus clouds showed signs of further development along a dry line to the south between Tulsa, Oklahoma, and Abilene, Texas. Atmospheric conditions were becoming progressively supportive of severe weather as a low-pressure area strengthened along the Kansas–Oklahoma border; a line of severe thunderstorms soon developed along a warm front over Missouri appended to the low-pressure system as a new line of storms arose to the south over northeastern Oklahoma. The thunderstorms over Missouri evolved into a strong cluster of supercells by 22:40 UTC (5:40 p.m. CDT) and were moving east-southeast into an area centered over southern Illinois with CAPE values near 2500 J/kg and dew points near 70 °F (21 °C). These storms persisted into western Kentucky after nightfall, advancing on the leading edge of a localized pool of high air pressure and cold air. There were 24 tornadoes in Missouri, 9 in Illinois, and 9 in Kentucky between 21 and 05 UTC (4 p.m.–12:00 a.m. CDT), including an F3 tornado that struck Jackson, Missouri, and an F4 tornado that took a path 33 mi (53 km) path through southern Illinois. A new area of accelerated winds in the upper levels of the troposphere—known as a jet streak—triggered the formation of storms east of the Dallas–Fort Worth metropolitan area and along the cold front over eastern Oklahoma by around 04:00 UTC (11:00 p.m. CDT). An F2 tornado touched down in Wood County, in northeastern Texas at 04:45 UTC (11:45 p.m. CDT) and took a 54.4-mile (87.5 km) mile path through four counties.

=== May 7 ===
The SPC predicted a Slight Risk for a broad area of the Eastern and Central U.S. in their 06:00 UTC (1:00 a.m. CDT) Day 1 Convective Outlook for May 7. Several shortwave troughs in the upper levels of the troposphere were expected to track northeastward or eastward across the region, overlapping with a broad and wavy front that extended from New England to New Mexico. At the time, a large mesoscale convective system, formed from the merger of supercells and other storms, was producing torrential rainfall over Tennessee and Kentucky with rain rates of 2–3 in (51–76 mm) per hour. Another complex of severe thunderstorms ahead of a cold front advanced across the Ark-La-Tex region after 07:00 UTC (2:00 a.m. CDT) with high wind shear in place; four tornadoes occurred in the region between 5–11 UTC (12–6 a.m. CDT). These storms continued to move east through an unstable environment, with a nearby outflow boundary producing enhanced vorticity supportive of tornado development; crossing several states, the storms reached the Atlanta, Georgia, area by around 1535 UTC (11:35 a.m. CDT). Additional storms continued to develop farther west over the same states as the surrounding air mass remained unstable with CAPE values between 1500 and 2000 J/kg. Six tornadoes occurred in Alabama, Arkansas, Louisiana, Mississippi, and Texas before noon, including an F2 tornado near Houston, Mississippi, that proved to be the only significant tornado during the day. The persistence of warm and moist air with the aid of daytime heating maintained the severe weather potential into the afternoon for the same areas. Fifteen tornadoes, all rated F0 or F1, touched down in Alabama, Mississippi, Georgia, between 17–1 UTC (12–8 p.m. CDT); most of the day's tornado reports occurred in these states. Thunderstorms sustained over the area into the evening before the surrounding airmass stabilized, resulting in a weakening of the storms by midnight.

Another line of storms moved in the Mid-Atlantic region during the afternoon, tracking into an environment supportive of severe weather; three tornadoes occurred in North Virginia and Maryland during the afternoon evening as the storms moved southeast, along with damaging winds in the Washington, D.C. area. Conditions were also marginally supportive of supercell thunderstorms in the Dakotas and the Rust Belt during the day. In the early afternoon, cumulus clouds began to build in the vicinity of San Angelo and Junction City in Texas as temperatures warmed above 90 °F (32 °C). Although the presence of a capping inversion initially prevented storm development, its subsequent weakening led the SPC to issue a tornado watch for northwestern Texas and southwestern Oklahoma at 22:00 UTC (5:00 p.m. CDT); within an hour, a pair of supercells developed over northwestern Texas. Overnight, a low-level jet with winds of around 50 kn (58 mph; 93 km/h) brought additional moisture into North Texas and Oklahoma, causing a warm front over Oklahoma to advance north and promoting atmospheric destabilization. Supercells rapidly developed near the warm front by 03:35 UTC (10:35 p.m. CDT) over northern Texas and southern Oklahoma, prompting an issuance of a tornado watch along the Red River; these storms became tornadic and persisted into May 8.

=== May 8 ===
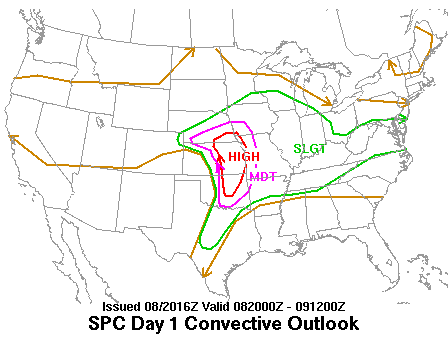
The SPC's convective outlook for May 8 indicated a High Risk of severe weather over the Central US, marking the third of four days during the tornado outbreak in which such a risk was forecast.

The SPC predicted that May 8 would be another significant day for severe weather. A negatively-tilted trough was forecast to move northeast across Kansas, prompting cyclogenesis in the region along the leeward side of the Rocky Mountains. During the day, a low-pressure area would intensify over southeastern Colorado, forcing a warm front northward from Oklahoma to Kansas and resulting in a weather pattern resembling the severe weather setup from May 4. Clearing skies were expected to allow CAPE values to rise unstable levels of around 3000–4000 J/kg, and, when combined with strong southwesterly winds aloft, were forecast to produce an environment conducive to the development of supercell thunderstorms. The SPC initially projected a Moderate Risk of severe weather over the central Great Plains before raising a High Risk for severe weather on May 8 centered on the Kansas City area. A more conditional risk for severe weather was predicted along a dry line over the southern Great Plains due to the presence of a capping inversion that was forecast to limit the coverage of storms.

The cluster of supercells that developed on the evening of May 7 along the Red River near a warm front remained active over the region into the early morning hours of May 8. One large supercell within the cluster produced three F2 tornadoes between 6–8 UTC (1–3 a.m. CDT) in Jefferson, Marshall, and Love counties in south-central Oklahoma. The same storm continued across eastern Oklahoma before weakening after crossing into Arkansas at around 12 UTC (7 a.m. CDT). Atmospheric conditions remained supportive of storm development further along the warm front to the east towards the Tennessee Valley through the morning hours and into the afternoon before warming air aloft resulted in increased convective inhibition. Another belt of storms, presenting primarily a threat of large hail, were concurrently active to the north between south-central Nebraska to northwestern Arkansas, supported by strong warm air and moisture advection; these storms also weakened as the influx of warm and moist air diminished.

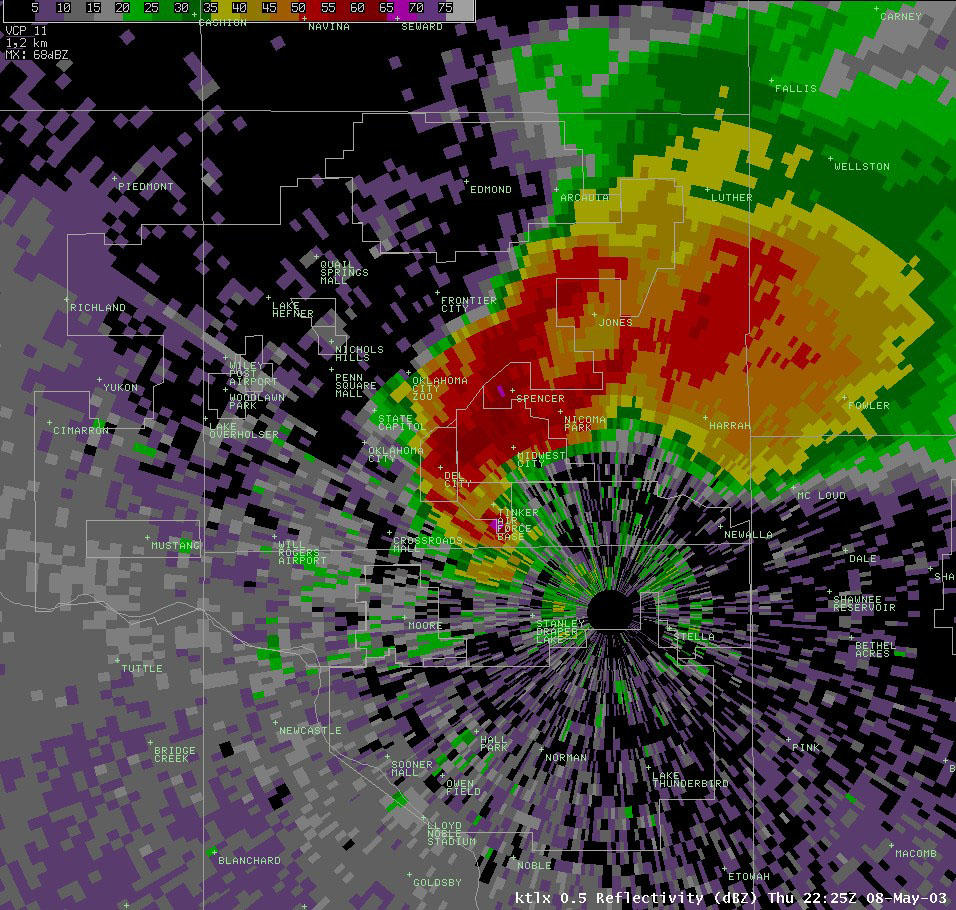
Radar image of the supercell that produced the F4 tornado in the Oklahoma City area

By 16:30 UTC (12:30 p.m. CDT), temperatures within the areas under the SPC's Moderate and High risk regions over the central Great Plains, central Mississippi Valley, and lower Ohio Valley warmed above 80 °F (27 °C) with dew points above 70 °F (21 °C). Although a capping inversion remained in place, forcing for the uplift of air was expected to be sufficient to overcome the temperature inversion; the SPC indicated that the atmospheric conditions would lead to any emergent storm rapidly organizing into a supercell. At 17:17 UTC (11:17 a.m. MDT), the first of five brief tornadoes confirmed in Colorado during the day—all rated either F0 or F1—touched down in Adams County. The severe thunderstorms in northeastern Colorado had developed with the aid of orographic lift and strong vorticity in the upper-levels of the troposphere. The quick formation of cumulus clouds ahead of a low pressure area by around 18 UTC (1 p.m. CDT) over central Kansas indicated that supercell development in the area was imminent.

Cumulus clouds were also becoming more numerous and robust ahead of the dry line between southwestern Oklahoma and south-central Kansas. The atmospheric environment in the region had become favorable for severe weather sooner than anticipated with CAPE values reaching above 4500 J/kg and wind shear ranging between 40 and 50 kn (46 and 58 mph; 74 and 93 km/h). These potent conditions were also present as far south as Central Texas, though the stronger capping inversion farther south meant more widespread severe activity was less likely. The SPC issued a tornado watch for northeastern Colorado, northwestern Kansas, and southwestern Nebraska at 18:30 UTC (12:30 p.m. MDT), followed by a second tornado watch for areas along the dry line in south-central Kansas and central Oklahoma at 18:35 UTC (1:35 p.m. CDT). A third tornado watch was issued for northern Kansas and southern Nebraska at 18:50 UTC (1:50 p.m. CDT) and the air mass overhead became increasingly unstable with CAPE values over 3000 J/kg ahead of a developing low-pressure area in the vicinity of Russell, Kansas.

Supercell thunderstorms quickly formed and intensified along and north of a warm front ahead of the strengthening low-pressure area and over Kansas and Nebraska after 20 UTC (3 p.m. CDT), accompanied by the formation of additional storms over eastern Kansas an hour later. The day's first tornado in Kansas was an F0 tornado that touched down in Cloud County at 20:32 UTC (3:32 p.m. CDT). A smaller area of low pressure forming along the dry line near the Lawton, Oklahoma, area produced conditions locally supportive of tornadogenesis. The first storms developing in this region initially failed to intensify as a result of the strong capping inversion overhead. However, these storms also caused the capping inversion to gradually diminish; the emergent storms became more sustained after 20:00 UTC (3:00 p.m. CDT). By the evening hours, a broken line of intense supercell thunderstorms were advancing east across eastern Kansas and Oklahoma within a moderately to highly unstable airmass as the pressure of the nearby cyclone deepened to 993 mbar (993 hPa; 29.3 inHg).

Two tornadic supercells in Oklahoma produced five tornadoes in the state during the afternoon. One strong supercell within an environment supportive of a strong or violent tornado approached the Oklahoma City metropolitan area shortly before 22 UTC (5 p.m. CDT). It spawned three tornadoes, with the final being an F4 tornado that caused significant damage in Moore, southeastern Oklahoma City, Midwest City, and Choctaw. The second supercell produced an F3 tornado in Osage County. A total of 21 tornadoes touched down in Kansas during the day, of which 5 were significant tornadoes with the strongest rated F3. One supercell led to five tornadoes in Osage and Douglas counties in Kansas, including one F3 tornado. The storms over Kansas persisted after 0 UTC (7:00 p.m. CDT), with tornadoes reported in eastern Kansas and western Missouri during the evening hours, while the strength of the capping inversion to the south suppressed more widespread severe weather. At 01:00 UTC (8:00 p.m. CDT), the SPC noted that tornadic supercells and conditions conducive to severe weather remained present, though the main risk area shifted east towards the central Mississippi River valley. The final tornado of the day was an F0 tornado in that lifted at 03:04 UTC (10:04 p.m. CDT) in Johnson County, Missouri.

Outside of the highest risk areas for severe weather, the SPC also noted the potential for severe weather in the Tennessee and Ohio river valleys amid the northward advance of a warm front was expected to advect moist and warm air, and around Virginia near a weak and slow-moving cold front. Severe thunderstorms tracked southeast through parts of the Mid-Atlantic states during the afternoon; one F0 tornado was reported in Essex County, Virginia. Widespread thunderstorms—some with mesocyclones—formed over parts of eastern Missouri, Illinois, southwestern Indiana, and western Kentucky during the afternoon in response to the influx of warm and moist air; four tornadoes occurred in these states during the day.

=== May 9 ===
The SPC projected a Moderate Risk of severe weather for parts of the Central Plains on May 9, assessing the potential for atmospheric conditions in the region to become unstable. CAPE values of 3500–4500 J/kg were anticipated alongside steep lapse rates aloft and strong wind shear. Severe weather was also forecast for the Mid-Atlantic region and the Ohio Valley. As the day progressed, a mid-tropospheric jet stream developed across the Great Plains in response to an intensifying low-pressure region over the Great Basin and a strengthening ridge of high pressure extending north into the Great Lakes. The northward-traveling warm front spanning from North Carolina low-pressure area in eastern Nebraska and a dry line over Kansas and Oklahoma were expected to be foci for the day's severe weather; this same dry line led to the tornadoes in central Oklahoma on May 8 and had moved west. In the early morning hours, a large area of thunderstorms with high cloud bases was tracking east across northern Illinois within a region of warm air advection, generating large hail and damaging winds despite meager atmospheric instability.

By around 17 UTC (1 p.m. EDT), some of the storms had congealed into a mesoscale convective system and were beginning to take a more southward trajectory into West Virginia and Virginia. Additional thunderstorms developed across eastern West Virginia and northern Virginia over the next hour, prompting the issuance of a tornado watch for the region. Supercells traversed southeast across parts of Virginia and North Carolina throughout the afternoon and into the evening. They reached the Outer Banks before 2 UTC (9 p.m. EDT) and eventually weakened as the surrounding air within the planetary boundary layer became more stable. Preliminarily, the eight tornadoes initially reported in Virginia were tied for the second most ever recorded in the state within a 24-hour period. Ultimately, five tornadoes were confirmed in Virginia and nine tornadoes were confirmed in North Carolina on May 9, with the first tornado touching down in Augusta County, Virginia, at 17:55 UTC (1:55 p.m. EDT) and the final tornado lifting from Greene County, North Carolina at 01:10 UTC (9:10 p.m. EDT); all tornadoes in these two states were rated either F0 or F1.

Closer to the main risk region, scattered thunderstorms began to form and strengthen over northwestern Texas by around 14 UTC (9 a.m. CDT) in response to the advection of warm air. Another cluster of potentially severe thunderstorms formed along the Ohio River in the early afternoon in the wake of the storms that moved through West Virginia, and additional storms continued to form in the region through the afternoon and evening in the vicinity of a well-defined warm front. Further convective activity developed in southeastern Missouri and southern Illinois during the afternoon as CAPE values reached over 4000 J/kg, indicative of a highly unstable atmosphere. The storms over Texas and Oklahoma were initially transient but became more sustained as a weak shortwave trough began to traverse the region. More thunderstorms developed along the dry line by the late afternoon over Texas and Oklahoma with conditions remaining favorable for the formation of supercells, including surface temperatures above 90 °F (32 °C) and dew points above 70 °F (21 °C). The air mass to the east of the dry line was also becoming exceptionally unstable; by 23:05 UTC (6:05 p.m. CDT), three tornado watches were in effect along a band from North Texas and central Indiana.

After 1 UTC (8 p.m. CDT), winds aloft over Oklahoma strengthened, resulting in increased wind shear and increased tornado potential. One supercell quickly developed along the dry line in Greer County and was marked with a severe thunderstorm warning at 23:32 UTC (6:32 p.m. CDT) as it tracked northeast. This supercell eventually produced ten tornadoes in Oklahoma, accounting for all of the state's tornadoes that day; the first of the tornadoes was an F0 tornado that touched down at 01:50 UTC (7:50 p.m. CDT) in Caddo County, while the final tornado lifted at 05:31 UTC (12:31 a.m. CDT) from Creek County the next day. The strongest of the ten tornadoes was an F3 tornado that hit parts of northeastern Oklahoma City, triggering a tornado emergency and marking the second consecutive day that tornadoes impacted the Oklahoma City area; this tornado was also the strongest tornado of the day. The supercell later dissipated in northeastern Oklahoma. During the same period, five tornadoes also occurred in northwestern Missouri where storms had been developing throughout the evening along a front, buoyed by the low-level that supported the tornadic activity in Oklahoma; the strongest of these tornadoes was rated F2 and tracked across Lafayette and Saline counties.

=== May 10 ===
Weather maps of the continental U.S. at 12:00 UTC (7:00 a.m. CDT) on May 10

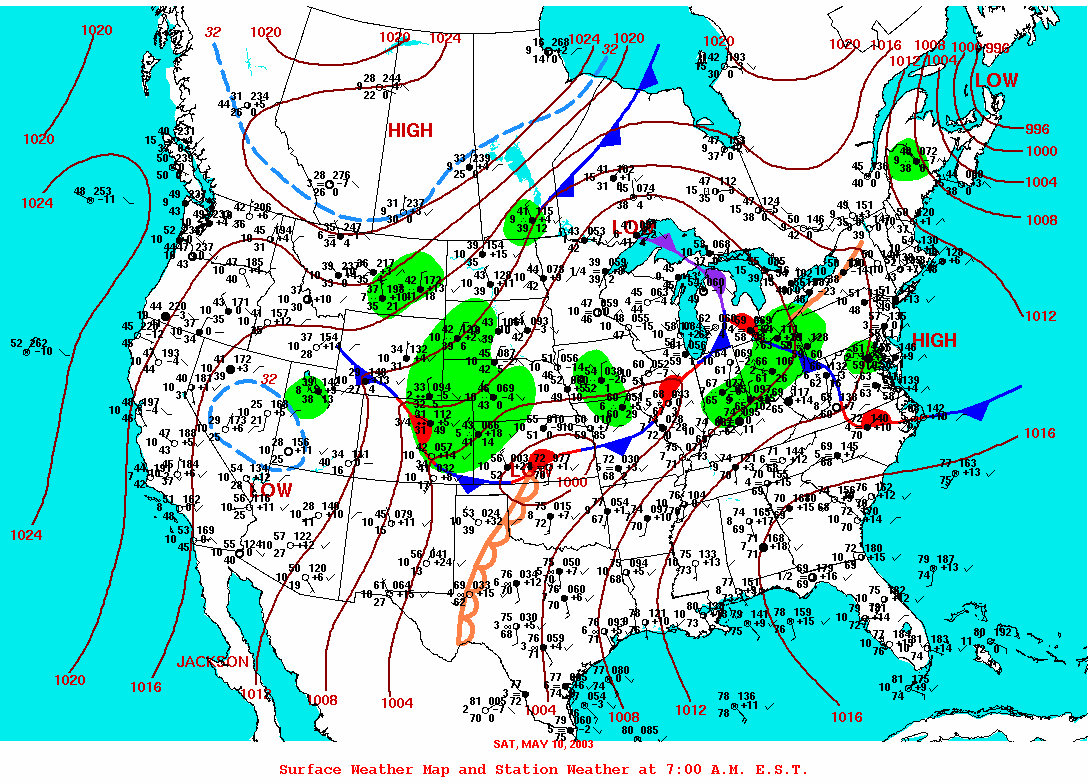
Surface weather analysis

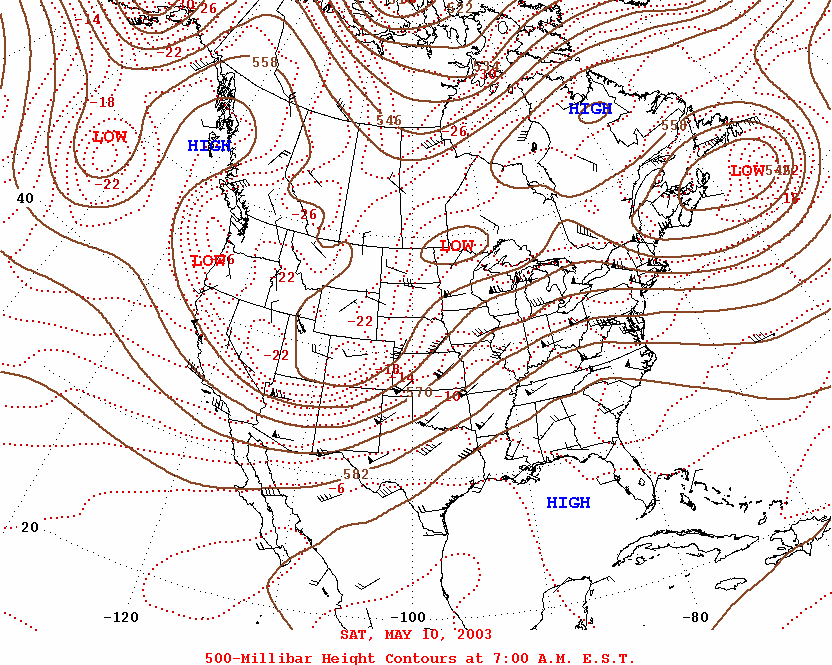
Winds and height of the 500 mbar (500 hPa; 15 inHg) pressure level

A meteorologist at National Weather Service St. Louis, Missouri, described the weather pattern over the U.S. as "synoptically evident" for severe weather on May 10. A powerful shortwave trough was forecast to move out of the southwestern U.S. into the southern Great Plains during the day, dragging along a portion of the jet stream with winds exceeding 100 kn (120 mph; 190 km/h). The approach of this jet stream was expected to increase the divergence of air aloft, leading to the cyclogenesis of a low-pressure area over the central Mississippi Valley that would track northeast towards the Great Lakes. This weather pattern would lead to the low-pressure system and its associated frontal boundaries moving through an unstable air mass exhibiting wind shear as high as 91 kn (105 mph; 169 km/h), leading to a potentially significant outbreak of severe weather. While the SPC initially indicated a Moderate Risk of severe weather for the day for an area centered on the central Mississippi Valley, a High Risk was later delineated for parts of northeastern Missouri and central Illinois in the agency's 13:00 UTC (8:00 a.m. CDT) forecast update as the potential for strong tornadoes became increasingly evident.

At around midnight, a low-pressure area was centered over central Oklahoma and southwestern Kansas, with a warm front extended out towards Chanute, Kansas. Strong 50–60 kn (58–69 mph; 93–111 km/h) winds aloft brought warm and moist air into the region, leading to enhanced convergence of air and fueling thunderstorm development along the warm front. Some of these storms acquired supercell characteristics. The intense supercell that had produced the tornadoes in Oklahoma the previous day continued into May 10, accompanied by dew points above 70 °F (21 °C) and a moderately unstable environment characterized by CAPE values between 2500 and 3000 J/kg; the storm spawned a final F1 tornado in Creek County at 05:25 UTC (12:25 a.m. CDT) before dissipating. Another pair of F0 tornadoes occurred in Butler at around 08:00 UTC (3:00 a.m. CDT). Widespread thunderstorms were also active early in the morning between Indiana and Pennsylvania in connection with a broad swath of rising air within an unstable air mass with dew points approaching 70 °F (21 °C).

As the warm front over the central U.S. developed further, additional storms initiated over northern Missouri by 11 UTC (6:00 a.m. CDT). These storms organized into a mesoscale convective system and tracked east towards central Illinois along and north of the warm front, later developing a mesoscale convective vortex. Isolated supercells later developed in the morning over central Illinois and western Indiana, aided by strong winds in the mid-levels of the troposphere and strong wind shear in the lower-levels of the troposphere. Eight tornadoes touched down in Illinois and Indiana between 12 and 17 UTC (7 a.m.–12 p.m. CDT); the strongest of these tornadoes was rated F1. The complex of storms also enhanced the advection of warm air downrange farther east, bolstering the development of thunderstorms farther east by destabilizing the local air mass. This favorable environment for rising air continued to spread east in tandem with a shortwave trough tracking across the Ohio Valley, extending conducive conditions for thunderstorm development eastward to Virginia and North Carolina in the early afternoon. An F3 tornado tracked 25 mi (40 km) across Mason and Lewis counties in Kentucky from 20:45–21:25 UTC (4:45–5:25 p.m. EDT); this was Kentucky's only tornado that day. Clusters of supercells developed and persisted over the Ohio Valley and over Virginia and North Carolina through the afternoon and evening, leading the SPC to issue three tornado watches.

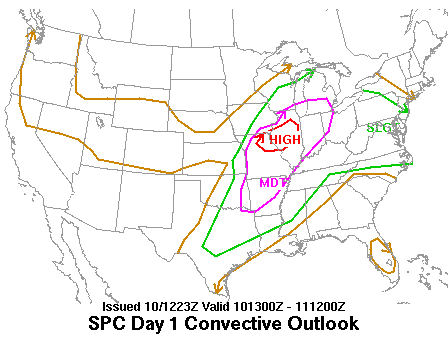
The SPC's convective outlook for May 10, indicating a High Risk of severe weather near St. Louis

Farther west, an outflow boundary remained between St. Louis, Missouri, and east-central Kansas in the wake of the thunderstorms earlier in the morning, serving as a potential region for rapid thunderstorm development. An atmospheric sounding taken over Oklahoma City at 12 UTC (7 a.m. CDT) indicated that a robust capping inversion was in place over the region, though satellite imagery and radar data also indicated that storms were beginning to develop vertically by around 14:17 UTC (9:17 a.m. CDT). At 16:30 UTC (11:30 a.m. CDT), the SPC expanded the High Risk region to include a wider swath from northeastern Oklahoma to Ohio as confidence increased in an afternoon and overnight tornado outbreak with strong to violent tornadoes materializing. As the area of low pressure over the central U.S. intensified, the air mass over eastern Kansas and western Missouri rapidly destabilized at around 17 UTC (12 p.m. CDT).

Warm and moist air also advanced north into southeastern Iowa and western Illinois ahead of the low-pressure region, with conducive conditions for tornadogenesis eventually extending as far north as southern Wisconsin after 23 UTC (6 p.m. CDT) as the low-pressure area quickly strengthened over Iowa. Isolated thunderstorms and towering cumulus clouds began to rapidly form along a dry line over central Oklahoma by around noon, with the local atmospheric conditions supportive of strong tornadoes. Additional supercell thunderstorms quickly emerged over Missouri and eastern Kansas over the next few hours, surrounding by an unstable air mass with CAPE values between 4000 and 5000 J/kg and high wind shear. Though wind shear was high enough to inhibit tornadogenesis, cyclical thunderstorm developments increased the odds of tornadogenesis as the storms tracked east.

At 21:02 UTC (4:02 p.m. CDT), an F0 tornado briefly touched down in Linn County, Missouri. Over the next seven hours, 38 tornadoes were documented across primarily rural areas of Iowa, Illinois, Missouri, and Wisconsin. Most of these tornadoes were spawned by nine discrete supercells that formed after 19 UTC (2 p.m. CDT) in western Missouri and southeastern Kansas along the dry line. These afternoon and evening storms were also enhanced by the outflow boundary left behind by the morning storms over Missouri: the boundary created a strong density gradient, increased wind shear, and lowered the height of the lifting condensation level, producing a localized area of heightened favorability for tornado formation. Two of the tornadoes—one in Missouri and the other in Illinois—received an F3 rating; these were the highest-rated tornadoes of the day. The longest-tracked tornado of the day, rated F2, touched down near Canton, Missouri, and lifted near Lima, Illinois, resulting in a tornadic path length spanning 89 mi (143 km). The supercells persisted overnight, tracking towards the Great Lakes region with the nearby low-pressure area continuing to intensify. The day's final tornado lifted from Woodford County, Illinois, at 03:35 UTC (10:35 p.m. CDT).

=== May 11 ===
The SPC predicted that the outbreak of severe weather that began on May 10 would continue into May 11, projecting a High Risk of severe weather over parts of Illinois and Indiana that would continue into the morning hours of May 11; additional severe weather was also expected throughout much of the Ohio and Mississippi valleys as the low-pressure system over Iowa intensified. A strong cold front extending south-southwest from the low-pressure area to northwestern Texas was expected to be a catalyst for severe weather as it swept through a moderately unstable air mass with strong winds throughout much of the troposphere. Many of the thunderstorms active across the Mississippi Valley towards the end of May 10 began to coalesce into linear complexes of storms towards the end of the day. These storms continued into May 11, developing into a squall line with embedded bow echoes that extended from western Indiana southwestward to the Mississippi River near Memphis, Tennessee. The storms were supported by an unstable air mass with dew points above 70 °F (21 °C) as they tracked east at 40–45 kn (46–52 mph; 74–83 km/h), producing strong winds and tornadoes. According to the National Climatic Data Center, 11 tornadoes touched down in Kentucky and Tennessee between 6–11 UTC (1–6 a.m. CDT), though a 2015 reanalysis conducted by the National Weather Service Nashville, Tennessee, found additional tornadoes that placed the total at 15. The first tornado was an F3 tornado that touched down in McLean County, Kentucky, at around 06:18 UTC (1:18 a.m. CDT). There were two other F3 tornadoes in central Tennessee, with one tracking across both Hickman and Williamson counties and the other striking parts of Rutherford County. The squall line persisted into the later part of the morning, moving across eastern Tennessee towards western North Carolina and Virginia.

By around 13:00 UTC (8:00 a.m. CDT), the extratropical cyclone that had intensified over the central and midwestern U.S. over the past day reached the upper Great Lakes region. While the squall line had begun to weaken by this point over the lower Appalachians, the SPC predicted that reintensification of the squall line along Interstate 95 was likely. The agency highlighted a Moderate Risk of severe weather across parts of the Mid-Atlantic states, with damaging winds constituting the primary severe weather threat. Warm advection led to the formation and intensification of isolated storms over New York and Pennsylvania by around 14 UTC (10 a.m. EDT). By 14:30 UTC (10:30 a.m. EDT), clearing skies ahead of an advancing cold front led to rapid destabilization of the air mass over eastern Ohio, western Pennsylvania, western New York, and northern West Virginia, with CAPE values reaching 1000–2000 J/kg amid dew points nearing 70 °F (21 °C). The SPC issued a tornado watch an hour later for this destabilizing region. Another tornado watch, tagged as a Particularly Dangerous Situation, was issued by the SPC at 17:50 UTC (1:50 p.m. EDT) for central New York and central and eastern Pennsylvania as showers began to increase ahead of the approaching cold front.

Although the SPC anticipated a considerable outbreak of severe weather along the strong cold front the day's severe weather was ultimately isolated and limited to parts of New York and Pennsylvania. There were only two weak tornadoes on May 11 in connection with the storms that passed through this region: an F0 tornado Lycoming County, Pennsylvania, and an F1 tornado in Wayne County, New York. The lack of storm activity despite otherwise conducive atmospheric conditions may have been caused by subsiding air in the mid-levels of the troposphere over the region as a result of convergent winds aloft, limiting the coverage and depth of thunderstorms. The lack of strong thermal gradients where instability was highest also contributed to the lack of severe weather. While the storms that produced the two tornadoes exhibited strong rotation, most storms on May 11 did not produce any substantial severe weather. Unlike in previous days, the day also featured a strong cold front that swept across the U.S., displacing the moist and unstable air mass that had remained over the central and eastern U.S. After May 11, the development of a ridge of high pressure over the Rocky Mountains—as opposed to the persistence of low pressure over the western U.S. in previous days—precipitated the end of the period of severe weather that began on May 3.

== Confirmed tornadoes ==
Confirmed tornadoes by Fujita rating
FU	F0	F1	F2	F3	F4	F5	Total
0	180	121	36	20	6	0	363

=== Kansas City metropolitan area ===
Kansas City metropolitan area tornadoes
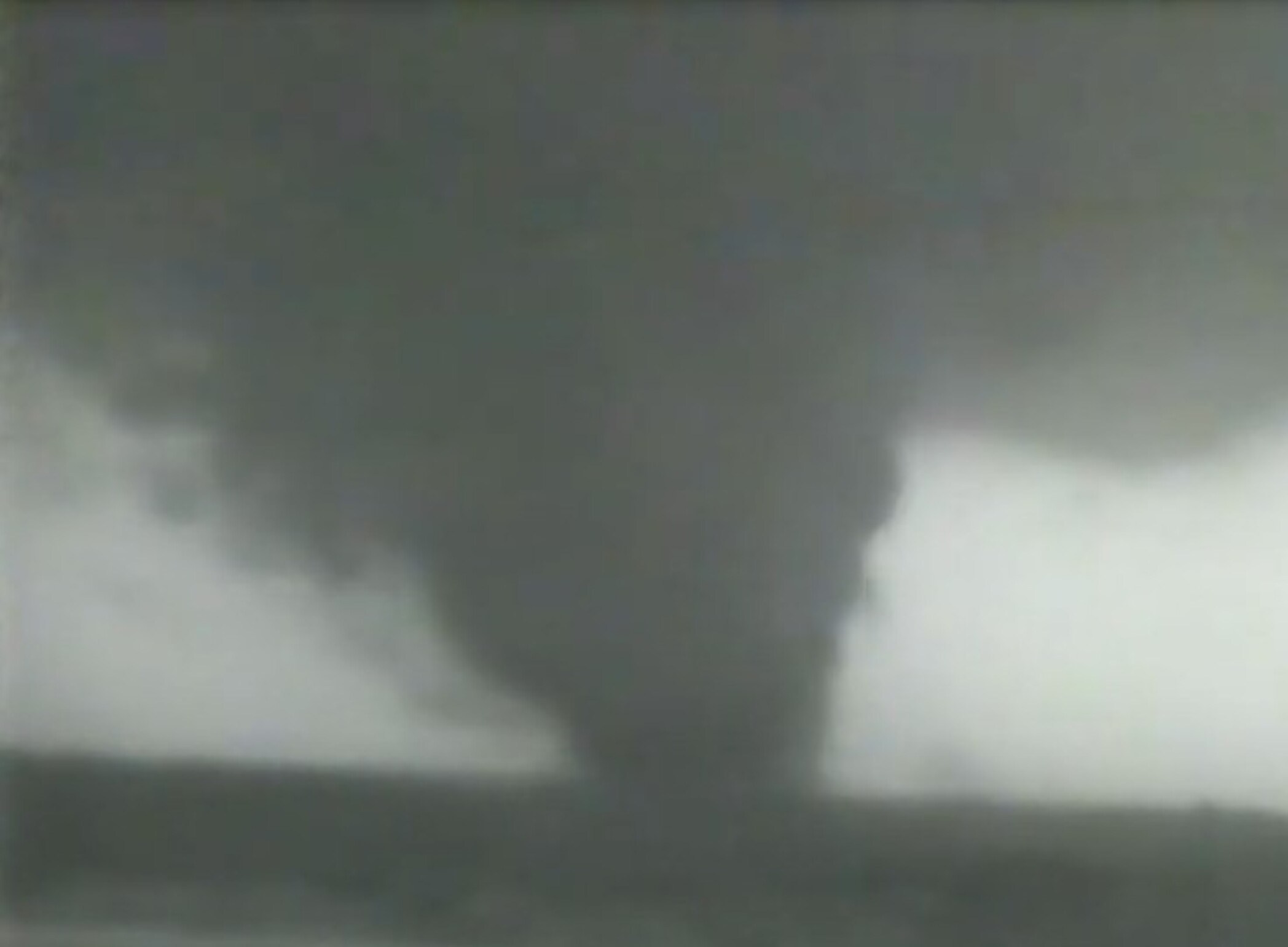
- The first F4 tornado shortly after formation as captured by a security camera

Meteorological history
- Formed: May 4, 2003, 3:35 p.m. CDT (UTC−05:00)
- Dissipated: May 4, 2003, 5:15 p.m. CDT (UTC–05:00)
- Duration: 1 hour, 40 minutes

Tornadoes
- Tornadoes: 5
- Max. rating: F4 tornado
- Highest winds: 207–260 mph (333–418 km/h)

Overall effects
- Casualties: 2 fatalities, 67 injuries
- Damage: $138.5 million (2003 USD)
- Power outages: 33,000

Northern parts of the Kansas City metropolitan area suffered heavy damage from tornadoes on May 4 in what was considered the most significant outbreak for the region since 1977. Five tornadoes occurred in the northland suburbs of Kansas City, of which four were caused by a single supercell; the strongest of these was classified as an F4. All flights via Kansas City International Airport were halted and passengers in the terminals were evacuated underground into tunnels for a half-hour. At the height of the storms, the Kansas City Power and Light Company reported that 33,000 of its electricity customers were without power, including Providence Medical Center where 22 persons were treated for injuries. Despite the severity of the tornadoes and the populations affected, Lynn Maximuk of the National Weather Service Weather Forecast Office in Pleasant Hill, Missouri, credited the partnerships between the National Weather Service and local emergency and media crews with the relatively low number of casualties.

The first tornado in the Kansas City area touched down in Leavenworth County, Kansas, and was first noted by Fort Leavenworth officials at around 3:45 p.m. CDT. Initially, the tornado remained over country but began damaging structures after crossing the Missouri River into Platte County, Missouri, near the intersection of Missouri Route 92 and North Farley Road. There, sixteen homes experienced minor damage, with the tornado producing a maximum of F1 damage over its 3 mi (4.8 km)-long and 50 yd (46 m)-wide track. North of Route 92, major damage to two barns and nearby damage to trees and fences was assessed by survey crews to have been caused by downburst winds from the parent thunderstorm.

A succession of four tornadoes from the same thunderstorm in Kansas City area began with the touchdown of an F2 tornado in southern Leavenworth County at approximately 3:54 pm. CDT. The 6 mi (9.7 km)-long damage path extended from northwest of Linwood, Kansas, to the south of Basehor, Kansas, with the worst damage occurring to homes near the intersection of 166th Street and Kansas Road. Two people were injured by the tornado. The second tornado—the strongest of the Kansas City tornadoes—began north-northwest of the Kansas Speedway at 3:54 pm. CDT in Wyandotte County, Kansas, initially producing F0–F1 damage. However, the tornado quickly grew in size and intensity, causing F3 damage to two homes south of Parallel Parkway near Interstate 435 and expanding to a width of over 500 yd (460 m). Low-end F4 damage was observed near the intersection of 91st Street and Leavenworth Road; one fatality occurred nearby within a region of F2–F3 damage. The tornado continued into the northeastern portions of Wyandotte County where the tornado produced a second region of low-end F4 damage near 79th Street and Cernech Road. Four 150 ft (46 m)-tall metal power poles built to withstand winds in excess of 200 mph (320 km/h) were damaged there. The tornado remained damaging but weakened over the remainder of its path, causing F1–F2 damage along the Missouri River across both Wyandotte County and Platte County in Missouri. The tornado crossed into Platte County near Riverside and Parkville, Missouri, at around 4:30 p.m. where it caused damage over a narrower expanse to commercial areas. F1-rated damage was observed after the tornado crossed Interstate 635 before lifting east of the highway at 4:42 pm. CDT in Clay County, Missouri. Overall, the F4 tornado killed two people and injured another thirty; one woman succumbed to her injuries seven months later. Communities in its path incurred a $47.5 million damage toll to property, of which $32 million occurred in Wyandotte County and $15.5 million occurred in Platte County. A total of 83 buildings were destroyed and another 582 sustained at least some degree of damage.

A new circulation developed northeast of the first F4 tornado and developed into another F4 tornado that impacted the Gladstone, Missouri, area between 4:45–5:00 pm. CDT. Initial damage was wrought to tree and roofs near Shady Lane and Antioch Road, with the severity rated F1. Intensification was quick thereafter, with marginal F4 damage noted in the Carriage Hills subdivision. Roofs and windows were damaged and business signage were destroyed. The tornado continued towards the northeast, causing F1–F3-rated damage before dissipating near Interstate 435; the total damage toll amounted to $31 million and 13 people were injured. The final tornado in the Kansas City region on May 4 impacted the Liberty, Missouri, area and was the costliest of those in the metropolitan area. Rated F2, the tornado caused substantial damage at William Jewell College and at locales near downtown Liberty before lifting around 5:15 pm. CDT over rural areas of Clay County. The most severe damage covered a swath that included eastern parts of the college campus and areas along Excelsior Springs Road, with the overall damage cost totaling $60 million.

=== Girard–Edison–Franklin, Kansas/Burgess–Liberal, Missouri ===
Girard–Edison–Franklin, Kansas/Burgess–Liberal, Missouri
- The tornado at peak intensity as it tore through Franklin

Meteorological history
- Formed: May 4, 2003, 4:35 p.m. CDT (UTC−05:00)
- Dissipated: May 4, 2003, 5:35 p.m. CDT (UTC–05:00)
- Duration: 1 hour

F4 tornado
- on the Fujita scale
- Highest winds: 260 mph (420 km/h)

Overall effects
- Casualties: 4 fatalities, 30 injuries

This large tornado touched down in Neosho County, Kansas, at 4:32 pm on May 4. The tornado was initially about 250 yards (230 m) wide and produced F2 damage as it crossed into Crawford County. Aerial damage surveys indicate an increase in width and intensification as the tornado approached the community of Ringo (5 miles (8 km) east of Girard), in Crawford County. Dramatic scouring of the ground was observed, homes were swept from their foundations, and heavy objects such as vehicles were tossed long distances (over 100 yards (90 m)). The NWS described the damage in this portion of the track as "high-end F4", though it is speculated that the tornado could have reached F5 intensity in this area. As it passed Ringo and entered the unincorporated town of Franklin (5 miles (8 km) north of Frontenac), the path reached over 1/2 mile (0.8 km) wide at points. Major devastation occurred in Franklin, as numerous buildings and homes were demolished, with some swept away. and Three people were killed in town, and 20 others were injured. The tornado continued producing "high end F4" damage to homes as it passed the town of Mulberry, where a train was derailed from the winds of the storm, and crossed into Barton County, Missouri. In Missouri, the tornado demolished several farm houses, killing an 88-year-old man. Some of the homes were swept completely away. Its path began to narrow several miles into Missouri; video and eyewitness accounts suggest that the tornado was "roping out" at this point. It finally lifted to the north of Liberal, Missouri, after having traveled for approximately 35 miles (56 km). Almost immediately after the Franklin tornado lifted, a second large tornado was reported to have touched down on the east side of Liberal. The Franklin tornado was covered on an episode of the Weather Channel's Storm Stories, and was described by meteorologist Jim Cantore as "one of the most violent tornadoes ever caught on film- a twister that would shred southeast Kansas".

=== Liberal–Jericho Springs–Stockton–Tunas, Missouri ===
Liberal–Jericho Springs–Stockton–Tunas, Missouri
- The wedge tornado approaching Stockton

Meteorological history
- Formed: May 4, 2003, 5:31 p.m. CDT (UTC−05:00)
- Dissipated: May 4, 2003, 7:42 p.m. CDT (UTC–05:00)
- Duration: 2 hours, 11 minutes

F3 tornado
- on the Fujita scale
- Highest winds: 175 mph (282 km/h)

Overall effects
- Casualties: 5 fatalities, 47 injuries
- Damage: $49 million (2003 USD)

At 5:31 pm. CDT (22:31 UTC), this long lived tornado began near Liberal, Missouri. As it moved northeast across Barton County, it uprooted numerous trees and produced F1 damage to outbuildings. The tornado entered Cedar County and progressed north of Jericho Springs where it destroyed a mobile home consistent with F2 intensity. The tornado remained over generally rural areas and caused solely tree and power line damage prior to reaching the intersection of Highway Z and County Road 825. There, a well-built frame home and two nearby outbuildings were completely destroyed, with their debris scattered across the adjacent roadway. Damage at this location warranted an F3 rating. Continuing northeast, the storm grew to between 0.5–0.75 mi (0.80–1.21 km) wide and entered downtown Stockton. In the city, 350 structures were demolished while an additional 650 received major damage. Numerous vehicles were flipped and tossed, including two cars from a local dealership which were blown approximately one block to the northeast of their original location. Damage was consistent with an upper-end F3 here. Three people died in Stockton: one man died after being struck by flying debris after his frame house was destroyed, one man died after being struck by flying debris after leaving his home during the tornado's approach, and one man died after refusing to seek shelter in his basement. Thirty-seven others were injured in Cedar County.

=== Pierce City–Aurora–Marionville–Clever–Battlefield, Missouri ===
Pierce City–Aurora–Marionville–Clever–Battlefield, Missouri
- The tornado seen to the north of Aurora, Missouri at F3 intensity

Meteorological history
- Formed: May 4, 2003, 6:50 p.m. CDT (UTC−05:00)
- Dissipated: May 4, 2003, 8:03 p.m. CDT (UTC–05:00)
- Duration: 1 hour, 13 minutes

F3 tornado
- on the Fujita scale
- Highest winds: 180 mph (290 km/h)

Overall effects
- Casualties: 7 fatalities, 48 injuries
- Damage: $47.8 million (2003 USD)

This intense F3 rated tornado first touched down in Newton County, east of Granby. The tornado had a 7 miles (11 km) path across Newton County, with the path paralleling Highway 60. Three homes and outbuildings were destroyed while another 5 were damaged. The tornado then crossed into Lawrence County, where several more communities would sustain major damage, with the community of Pierce City in particular sustaining major damage from the tornado. Numerous buildings that were over 100 years old ended up completely destroyed in the downtown area of Pierce City. A total 229 homes, businesses, and outbuildings were destroyed, and another 320 were heavily damaged. The tornado killed five residents in Pierce City, and injured another 33. The tornado continued into Christian County, where it would strike populated areas between Billings, and Clever. In this area, one fatality and three injuries occurred. 27 structures were destroyed, while another 150 were heavily damaged. The tornado continued through Greene County, where it would cause major destruction to the city of Battlefield. 100 homes and outbuildings were completely destroyed, and another 150 sustained major damage. The tornado also killed one local resident, and injured another 12 people across Greene County. The tornado rapidly weakened after leaving Battlefield, and dissipated south of Springfield.

In total, this tornado cost around $47.8 million in damage (2003 USD), had a path length extending out 49 miles (79 km) across southern Missouri, and had a peak width of 880 yards (800 m).

=== Jackson, Tennessee ===
Jackson, Tennessee
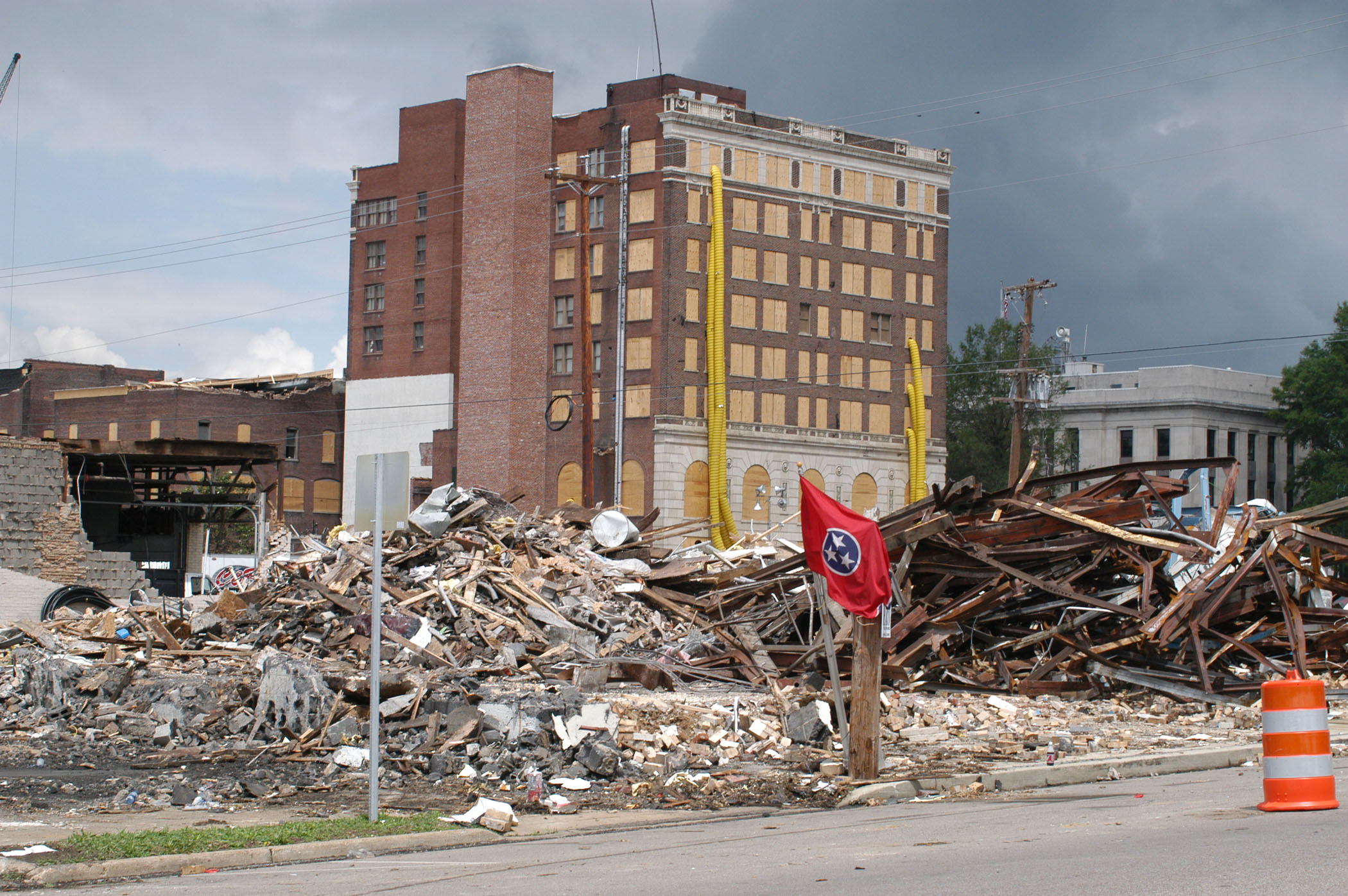
- F4 level damage to downtown Jackson, Tennessee

Meteorological history
- Formed: May 4, 2003, 11:35 p.m. CDT (UTC−05:00)
- Dissipated: May 5, 2003, 12:10 a.m. CDT (UTC–05:00)
- Duration: 35 minutes

F4 tornado
- on the Fujita scale
- Highest winds: 235 mph (378 km/h)

Overall effects
- Casualties: 11 fatalities, 86 injuries

This violent tornado touched down in the southwest part of Madison County, Tennessee, near Denmark and tracked east through the downtown section of Jackson. The tornado continued to move east and eventually crossed into Henderson county. Nine people were killed in mobile homes between Denmark and Jackson and two other persons were killed in an apartment complex in Jackson.

In Jackson, countless buildings were destroyed, particularly in downtown Jackson. St. Luke Episcopal Church, one of the oldest churches in Tennessee built in 1844, was destroyed. The Carl Perkins Civic Center, Tennessee Supreme Court Building, the downtown Jackson Post Office and National Guard Armory were damaged. Also damaged was the Procter & Gamble factory where Pringles Potato Chips are made and a Coca-Cola bottling plant was also damaged. Denmark Elementary School and Jackson Middle School were destroyed and 24 other schools in the county were damaged. The tornado caused severe damage to the local power and water utilities across the county. One of eight stone balls that were set up to commemorate the eight fatalities from the Jackson tornado of January 17, 1999 was blown across a street.

The tornado then produced substantial damage to the city of Jackson continued into Henderson county and moved through the city of Lexington. Thirty-six homes were destroyed and nearly 1,000 homes were damaged. Seven commercial buildings were destroyed and another 73 were damaged including the Everett Horn Library.

=== New Grand Chain–Hillerman–Golconda, Illinois ===
New Grand Chain–Hillerman–Golconda, Illinois
- A home wiped off its foundation near Hillerman, Illinois

Meteorological history
- Formed: May 6, 2003, 9:32 p.m. CDT (UTC-05:00)
- Dissipated: May 6, 2003, 10:42 p.m. CDT (UTC–05:00)
- Duration: 1 hour, 10 minutes

F4 tornado
- on the Fujita scale
- Highest winds: 210 mph (340 km/h)

Overall effects
- Fatalities: 2
- Injuries: 33
- Damage: $16.00 million (2003 USD)

This large and violent tornado first touched down southeast of New Grand Chain in the far eastern side of Pulaski County, quickly reaching its maximum intensity of 210 mph (340 km/h) as it approached the Massac County line. The tornado would hit and completely destroy a home, resulting in the death of a 53 year old man who was protecting his son by lying on top of him when the basement ceiling above them collapsed inwards. The son survived, but sustained multiple injuries. The home was also impaled by multiple nearby trees which prevented it from being swept further away. The tornado continued to cause major damage to numerous mobile homes and campgrounds in Pulaski County.

The tornado maintained its maximum intensity as it continued into Massac County, quickly approaching areas near the community of Hillerman. In this area, numerous mobile homes were completely disintegrated, and several modern frame homes were completely leveled. One frame home was swept clean away from its foundation, with only a part of the roof remaining intact after being blown into a creek 200 yards (180 m) from the original location of the home. Many vehicles were rolled or tossed over 100 yards (91 m). Numerous cases of missiling were observed, including glass embedded in trees. Tree destruction in forested areas was nearly complete, and a few trees were debarked. A 65 year old woman would end up being the only fatality in Massac County when the tornado overtook and disintegrated her mobile home. The cause of death was determined to be blunt force trauma to the head. She was found in a water-filled ravine about 100 yards (91 m) from the former site of her mobile home. The frame of the mobile home was wrapped around the trunks of two trees that were stripped of all their limbs. Most of the levelled frame homes were concentrated on Boaz Road and Rolling Hills Road, in or near Hillerman. After passing through Hillerman, the tornado would continue northeast, and would overturn several railroad cars of a train just west of the Mermet Lake Conservation Area. This area sustained further extensive damage from the tornado. An estimated 300 acres of forest were destroyed, boat docks were destroyed, and bathing facilities were destroyed. Dozens of waterfowl were found dead. After destroying additional residences and high tension power lines, the tornado crossed Interstate 24 near mile marker 28, about a mile south of the New Columbia exit. Tractor-trailer rigs and a tour bus were overturned on the interstate, injuring the drivers. The interstate was closed due to grain bins, tree limbs, and some building debris on the highway. Additional residences were destroyed between the interstate and the Pope County line. The tornado crossed into Pope County near where Illinois Route 145 crosses the county line.

After crossing into Pope County, the tornado would continue northeast, beginning to impact the communities of Temple Hill, Homberg, and Brownfield. In Pope County, Three mobile homes and four permanent homes were completely destroyed, along with numerous barns and outbuildings. An additional nine single-family homes and two mobile homes received major damage. Dozens of other residences received minor to moderate damage. Some vehicles were rolled or moved. The tornado passed just west and northwest of Golconda before dissipating at 10:42 p.m. CDT, just 1 mile (1.6 km) north of town. Just west of Golconda, an elementary school had its roof blown off of the gymnasium. Despite intense structural damage in Pope County, nobody was injured or killed.

Overall, The tornado had been on the ground for 1 hour and 10 minutes, had a total path length of 33 miles (53 km), and a maximum width of 1,000 yards (910 m).

=== Moore–Oklahoma City–Choctaw, Oklahoma ===
Moore–Oklahoma City–Choctaw, Oklahoma
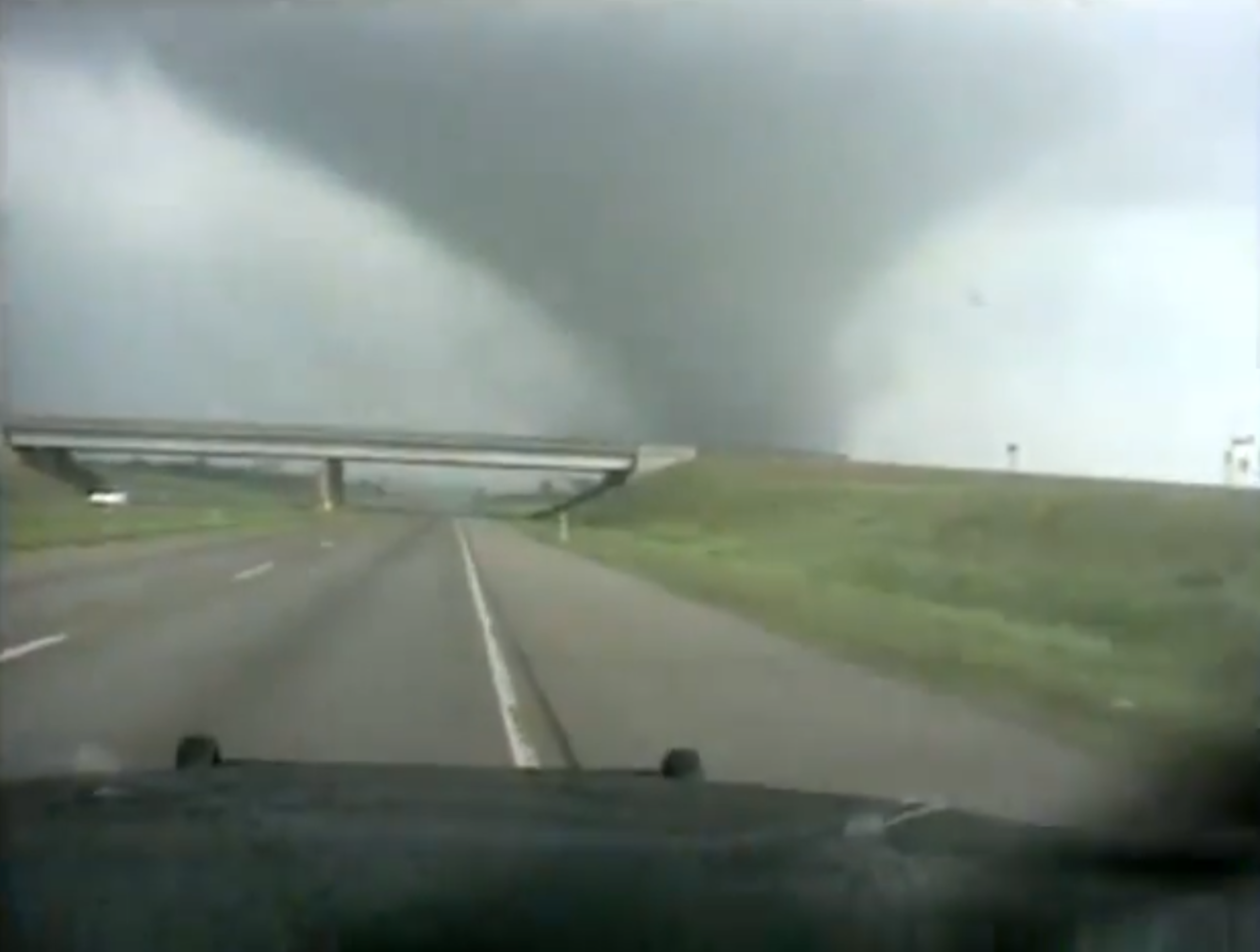
- Police video still of the tornado in Moore

Meteorological history
- Formed: May 8, 2003, 5:10 p.m. CDT (UTC−05:00)
- Dissipated: May 8, 2003, 5:38 p.m. CDT (UTC–05:00)
- Duration: 28 minutes

F4 tornado
- on the Fujita scale
- Highest winds: 210 mph (340 km/h)

Overall effects
- Injuries: 134
- Damage: $370.5 million (2003 USD)

Four years after an F5 tornado caused incredible damage across much of the Oklahoma City metropolitan area during the 1999 Oklahoma tornado outbreak, this strong and impactful tornado affected the area. The storm responsible for the tornado developed across Grady County during the mid-afternoon hours and produced a weak tornado near Newcastle and west of Moore. Just after 5:00 pm, a new tornado touched down on the west side of Moore west of Interstate 35 and moved east northeast across the city; the tornado proceeded to cause damage across southeastern sections of Oklahoma City, including Tinker Air Force Base near Interstate 40, and also near Midwest City and Choctaw. Despite extensive damage along the path, no fatalities were caused by the tornado, although dozens of injuries were reported across Cleveland and Oklahoma Counties.

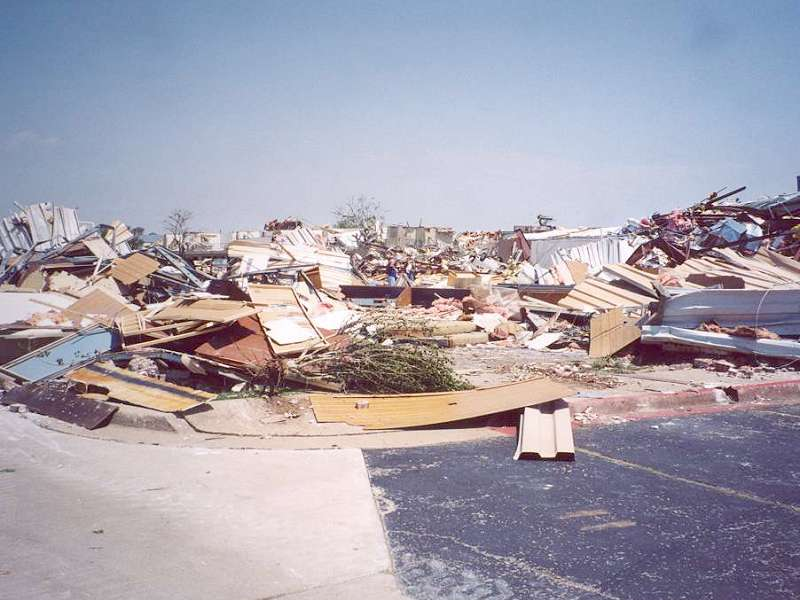
Extensive damage was widespread across the southeastern Oklahoma City metro area.

Within Moore city-limits, the peak damage caused near the center of the tornado was mostly rated as F2, although a few isolated locations received F3-rated damage; F3 damage in Moore was observed near 12th Street where several businesses, two hotels, an office building, a church, several restaurants, a child center and a Headstart Program building were either severely damaged or destroyed. The tornado also damaged numerous homes in the Highland Park subdivision which was mostly destroyed by the F5 tornado which passed just a few blocks north of the May 8, 2003, tornado. Other homes on the north side of the city also sustained significant damage before the tornado crossed the Cleveland–Oklahoma county line.

In the Oklahoma City area, the General Motors Oklahoma City Assembly sustained major damage as did as a manufacturing plant near Interstate 240 where F4 damage was observed. Several other businesses were either damaged or destroyed. At Tinker Air Force Base, a storage bunker and several fences were damaged. Several subdivisions in eastern Oklahoma City, Choctaw and Midwest City were also affected by the tornado with several homes sustaining significant damage.

Over 1,150 homes were affected by the tornado. 300 of those homes were fully destroyed. SH-35 and interstate 240 were temporarily closed due to debris covering the roads. The American Red Cross opened 3 shelters in metro Oklahoma City. The Salvation Army opened two food centers in Choctaw and three food centers in Moore. More feeding centers opened near Binger and Norman. Free tetanus shots were handed out to those in need.

=== Other regions ===
Several cities in the Ozarks region were impacted by tornadoes on the evening of May 4. More than 100 buildings in Crawford County, Missouri, were damaged.

== Non-tornadic impacts ==
=== Southeastern United States ===
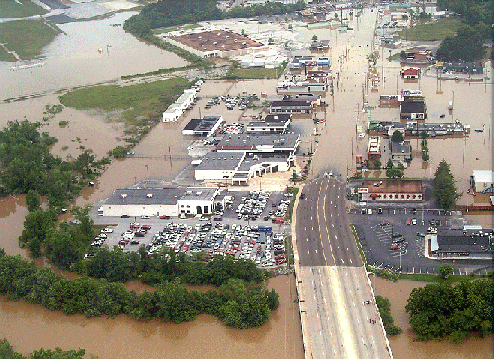
Flooding in Chattanooga, Tennessee along the banks of South Chickamauga Creek

Accompanying the record period of tornadic activity was a significant flood event that impacted parts of the Southeastern United States. A stagnation of the typical eastward movement of storm systems across the United States resulted in the stalling of a warm front over Tennessee, keeping the region in a moist air mass with dew point temperatures above 60 °F (16 °C)—characteristic of highly moisture-laden air. The floods lasted for eight days, affecting a 272,100 km^{2} (105,100 mi^{2}) area and displacing 2,000 people.

Rains in southeastern Tennessee beginning on April 30 saturated surfaces and elevated river levels, amplifying a period of heavy precipitation beginning on May 5 that featured repeated passages of thunderstorms over the same areas. The positioning of a high pressure area over the western Atlantic maintained a southerly wind throughout the region, producing a prolonged flow of moisture from the Gulf of Mexico. During the following five days, over 9 in (230 mm) of rain would fall across the watersheds of the Little Tennessee and Hiwassee rivers, including more than 12 in (300 mm) of rainfall reported over a 35-hour span in McMinn County. The nearby South Chickamauga Creek in Chattanooga reached a record crest of 29.32 ft (8.94 m) on May 8. The resulting damage in the Chattanooga area from the swollen tributaries was evaluated at $20 million. The Tennessee River at Chattanooga reached a stage of 36.1 ft (11.0 m), within a foot of the record high set in February 1973; riverside flooding prompted the evacuation or rescue of hundreds of individuals from adjacent counties and along its tributaries. Similar impacts were felt in West and Middle Tennessee, necessitating a 20-county presidential disaster declaration due the floods, tornadoes, and associated severe weather. Flooding along Saunders Fork Creek in Cannon County resulted in the deaths of three people in two vehicles. Another fatality occurred after a driver and their vehicle went airborne in crossing a washed out section of road in Wayne County; a total of 18 roads and bridges were washed out by the flooding in the county. The floods in Wayne County also inundated 100 homes, resulting in the rescue of 50 people.

Flood impacts extended southward from Tennessee. Drawing moisture from the moist tropical air mass, thunderstorms associated with the severe weather outbreak on May 7 produced torrential precipitation over Alabama. Northern and northeastern areas of the Greater Birmingham area of Alabama experienced up to 11 in (280 mm) of rainfall from several storms over the course of a few hours on May 7, resulting in historic flooding. Radar estimates suggested that as much as 5–8 in (130–200 mm) fell in some locations in one hour. Throughout Jefferson County—which includes Birmingham—at least 120 thoroughfares were blocked by floodwaters. All roadways in Leeds and Brookside were flooded. Many schools and homes were also inundated, resulting in several rescues and evacuations. Total property damage in the county alone reached $1 billion. Rivers swelled downstream from the accumulated rainfall, impacting areas not directly affected by the storms. An elevated Tallapoosa River nearly isolated Wadley, Alabama, with Alabama State Route 22 connecting Wadley to points east becoming fully submerged. Across Central Alabama, the Red Cross reported damage to more than 700 homes. Due in part to the heavy rains between May 4–8, May 2003 was the wettest month for Huntsville since 1983.

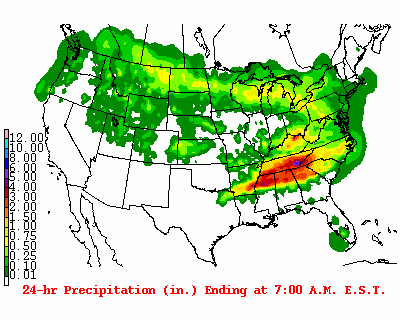
Heavy rainfall on May 6 straddled the southern Tennessee border, impacting much of the Tennessee River basin.

The same storms produced heavy rainfall across the northern and central portions of Georgia. With soils saturated from prior rains, the prolonged precipitation period produced seasonally anomalous runoff that flowed into creeks and rivers, resulting in rapid rises of streams and associated rivers, including Chickamauga Creek, Conasauga River, Chattahoochee River, Flint River, and Sweetwater Creek. Near West Point, the Chattahoochee River rose to 23.2 ft (7.1 m), reaching its highest levels since 1961. The flooding washed out roads, damaged at least 200 residential buildings, and inundated numerous businesses. Two people were killed in the state as a result of the floods overtaking their vehicles. Much of Georgia was also impacted earlier by widespread severe weather on May 2, with large hail or wind damage reported in most counties beginning in the afternoon hours. The primary impacts transitioned from hail to strong downbursts after sunset as what ultimately became a singular line of storms tracked southward. The largest hail of the day—approximately the size of baseballs—occurred near Trion in Chattooga County.

Severe weather swept across South Carolina on May 6, concentrated in two waves of thunderstorms organized in a mesoscale convective system. The complex originated over northern Georgia and persisted within an unstable airmass. Storm activity resulted in golf-ball-sized hail in four counties while strong winds caused some scattered tree and building damage. A macroburst in McCormick County destroyed a mobile home and damaged several others due to falling trees, resulting in $80,000 in damage. On May 9, storms in North Carolina near the state border with Virginia produced large hail and strong winds, cutting power to 1,900 customers of Progress Energy Inc. Hail as large as 4.25 in (108 mm) in diameter was documented in Northampton County, damaging vehicles and homes.

A pair of damaging hailstorms impacted the Paducah, Kentucky, area on May 4. The first took a path from near Cairo, Illinois, to Lake Barkley in Kentucky and dropped hail as large as 2.75 in (70 mm) in diameter near Calvert City, Kentucky, breaking windshields and denting vehicles. Minor damage was inflicted to the roofs of hundreds of homes. One person was injured in Paducah by the hailstorm; this was the first reported hail-related injury in the warning area of National Weather Service Paducah, Kentucky, since 1994. Causing tens of millions of dollars in damage, the hailstorm was one of the most destructive in far western Kentucky's history; the damage toll included $10 million in damage for Marshall County, Kentucky, and $20 million in damage in nearby Massac County, Illinois. The second storm produced hail from Pope County, Illinois, to McLean County, Kentucky. The storms were complemented by other hailstorms, albeit less significant, across the region. Thunderstorms in the Louisville area cut power to 24,000 homes and businesses. On May 5, heavy rains impacted areas of northeastern Kentucky, resulting in flooding along the banks of Tygarts Creek and the Little Sandy River; the floods caused $1.3 million in damage.

In addition to an F0 tornado-producing storm in the Northern Virginia, a second severe thunderstorm producing strong winds caused damage in the Virginian suburbs of Washington, D.C. on May 7, downing power lines and trees in Fairfax County and near Falls Church. A microburst with winds of up to 70 mph (110 km/h) downed trees in eastern Warrenton. The same storms persisted into southern Maryland, downing trees in the La Plata area and St. Mary's County. On May 8, a fast-moving thunderstorm caused a power outage affecting 4,100 people in Gloucester County, Virginia, felling trees and downing power lines. Several damaging severe thunderstorms tracked across Virginia on the following day, producing winds as high as 92 mph (148 km/h) as measured in Centenary. In addition to damage to infrastructure, one person was killed by a fallen tree in Arvonia. In West Virginia, storms along and south of a warm front produced severe weather and flooding rains, particularly in the Little Kanawha River watershed. Overflowed banks resulted in inundation in some areas of Webster, Braxton, and Randolph counties, resulting in over $1 million in damage. Strong thunderstorm winds in Greenbrier County felled trees and power lines, resulting in one injury.

=== Midwestern United States ===
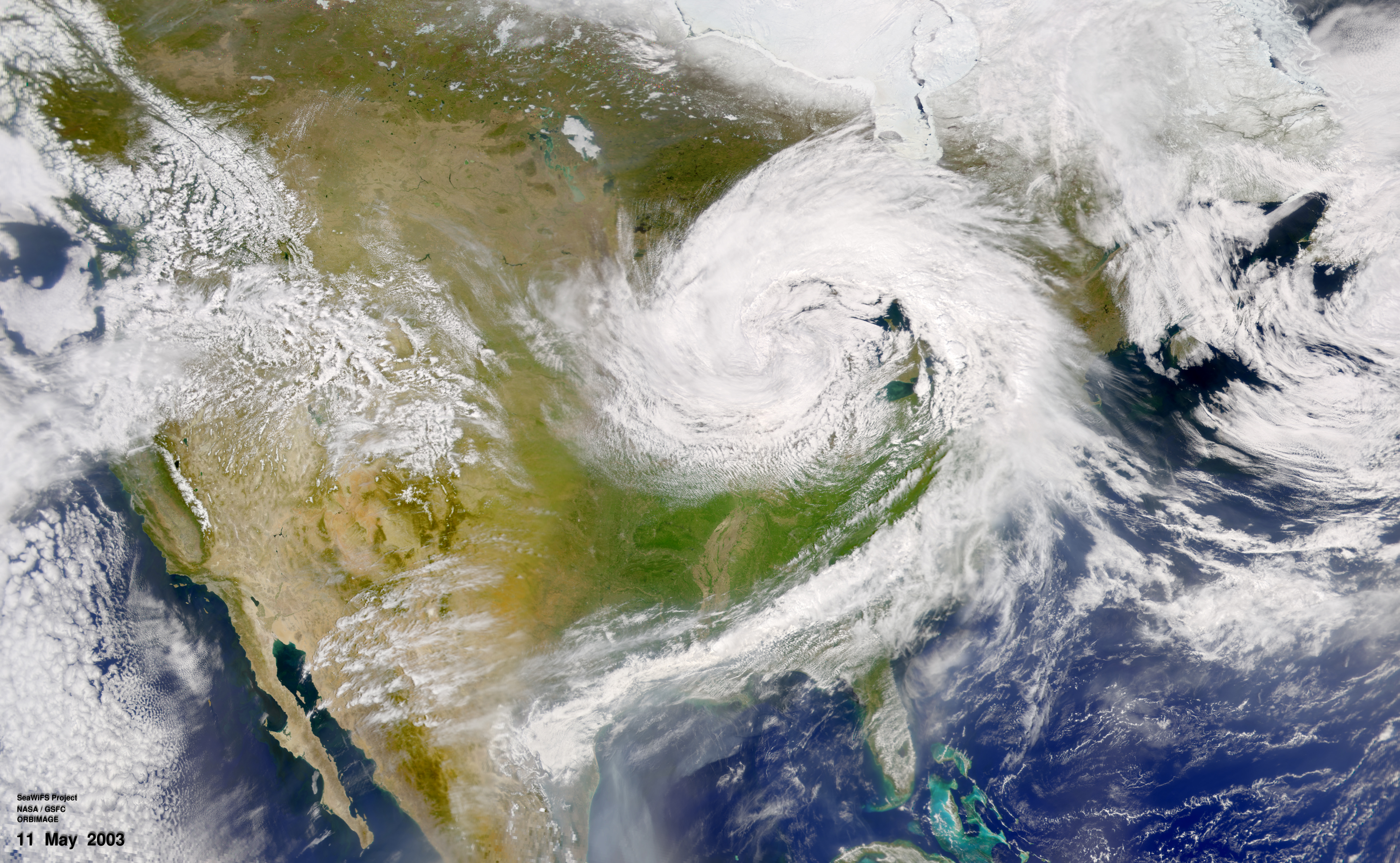
A strong cold front associated with a low-pressure area near the Great Lakes produced damaging winds across the Midwest on May 11.

Large hail and strong winds were reported across south-central Nebraska on May 4, including gusts as strong as 80 mph (130 km/h) north of Pauline. Hailstorms in the state that day collectively caused about $1.3 million in damage, including the loss of inventory at two car dealerships in the Holdrege area. Softball-sized hail damaged cars and homes near Offutt Air Force Base. Kansas was also impacted by hail and strong winds, resulting in downed power lines. Four days later, 38 freight cars on a BNSF Railway in Chase County, Kansas, were derailed by thunderstorm winds, including one car filled with sulfur dioxide. The chemical release prompted the evacuation of about 250 residents and six firemen and law enforcement personnel were treated for respiratory ailments caused by the compound.

Exacerbating the significant tornado outbreak, storms along the dry line in Missouri also produced widespread hail on May 4, peaking at 3.50 in (89 mm) near Gladstone. Another bout of storms two days later caused flooding in northern Jefferson County, submerging roads and resulting in one death. De Soto was particularly hard hit, with a school severely damaged by straight-line winds alongside downed trees and power lines. Wind gusts in the De Soto storm were estimated to have been near 100 mph (160 km/h), destroying 6 single-family homes and inflicting major damage to 27. Flooding was also reported in Phelps County and washed out roads in Laclede County, in addition to producing small hail and minor damage to infrastructure. More severe storms struck the state two days later; in Bates County, hail as large as 4 in (100 mm) damaged 1,100 homes and 750 cars, resulting in a $6.75 million damage toll. A wind gust of 104 mph (167 km/h) was measured at Whiteman Air Force Base, though the site did not sustain any damage. Wind gusts estimated at 85 mph (137 km/h) produced a swath of damage in the Hallsville and Centralia areas, damaging four mobile homes and injuring one person. One person was killed on May 9 after attempting to traverse a low-water crossing in Monroe County. The following day, severe storms in the St. Louis area disrupted power to 10,000 electricity customers and caused flashed flooding in the region.

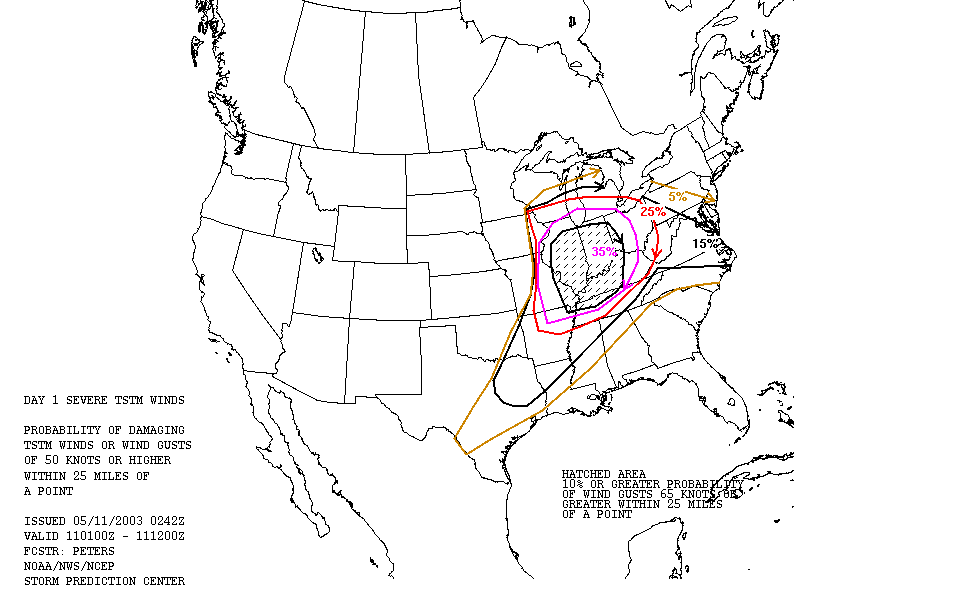
The SPC predicted the potential for severe winds for a large portion of the Ohio River Valley for the evening of May 10 and early morning hours of May 11

The repeated storm activity brought frequent thunderstorms over Iowa, causing intermittent periods of heavy rainfall and flooding. The heaviest rainfall occurred on May 4, when Des Moines set a rainfall record for the day with 2.73 in (69 mm) being reported. Some roads were flooded in the city's metropolitan area with flash flooding occurring in some counties, though the precipitation was overall beneficial for the state's agricultural interests and water supplies. The storms on May 4 also produced scattered hail with sizes generally between 0.25–1 in (6.4–25.4 mm) across the state. Behind one line of storms, the development of a low-pressure area in their wake produced a swath of 50 mph (80 km/h) winds across eastern Iowa and northern Illinois, doing at least $2 million in damage. A significant hail event took place in eastern Iowa on May 8, additionally affecting northern Missouri and northern Illinois. A car dealership in Fort Madison, Iowa reported damage to 400 cars in the city's largest hail event since 1993. Three schools and a golf course were heavily damaged on the south side of Burlington, Iowa; classes were cancelled at those schools following rainwater intrusion via holes created by hail. The hail caused $38 million in damage across eastern Iowa and $12 million in damage across northwestern Illinois. Flash flooding that same day in Jersey County, Illinois, resulted in one fatality. Late on May 9, a cluster of thunderstorms produced a gravity wave that resulted in a damaging and narrow band of strong winds that downed trees and power lines, causing a power outage that affected 2,000 people primarily in Freeport, Illinois. Additional storms produced similar impacts in northeastern Illinois on May 11, leaving 30,000 people without power.

On May 11, the passage of a strong cold front caused widespread wind damage across northern Ohio. Several weather stations recorded gusts in excess of 40 mph (64 km/h), resulting in scattered power outages and downed trees and utility poles throughout the region. Similar effects were felt in Indiana, Michigan, and Wisconsin as a result of the frontal passage; in Indiana, 12,000 households were without power during the strongest winds. Several roads were closed due to vehicle accidents or obstructing debris. Some overpasses in Allen Park, Michigan were flooded after a fallen light pole cut power to a storm pump station. Strong winds also indirectly caused the leakage of hydrochloric acid from a plant in Ypsilanti, Michigan after roofing knocked loosed by the wind broke a distribution pipe.

=== South-Central Plains ===
Throughout the severe weather outbreak, the National Climatic Data Center documented 249 hail events and 42 thunderstorm winds in the state of Oklahoma. Eastern Oklahoma was impacted by tornadoes and strong thunderstorms on May 4. Strong winds reportedly tumbled four to six rail cars near Alderson and destroyed two mobile homes 1 mi (1.6 km) north of Fairland. Blown-down trees were documented across several counties as a result of the strong winds. Choteau, Jay, and Grove sustained the brunt of power outages that affected 1,500 energy customers. At Grand Lake, several boat docks were damaged and between 150 and 200 trees were blown down by winds estimated at 80 mph (130 km/h), resulting in $100,000 in damage. The storms in central Oklahoma on May 8 cut power to 37,000 homes and businesses according to Oklahoma Gas & Electric, including half of Pawhuska, Oklahoma.

Storm Prediction Center (SPC) local storm reports received between May 3–11, 2003
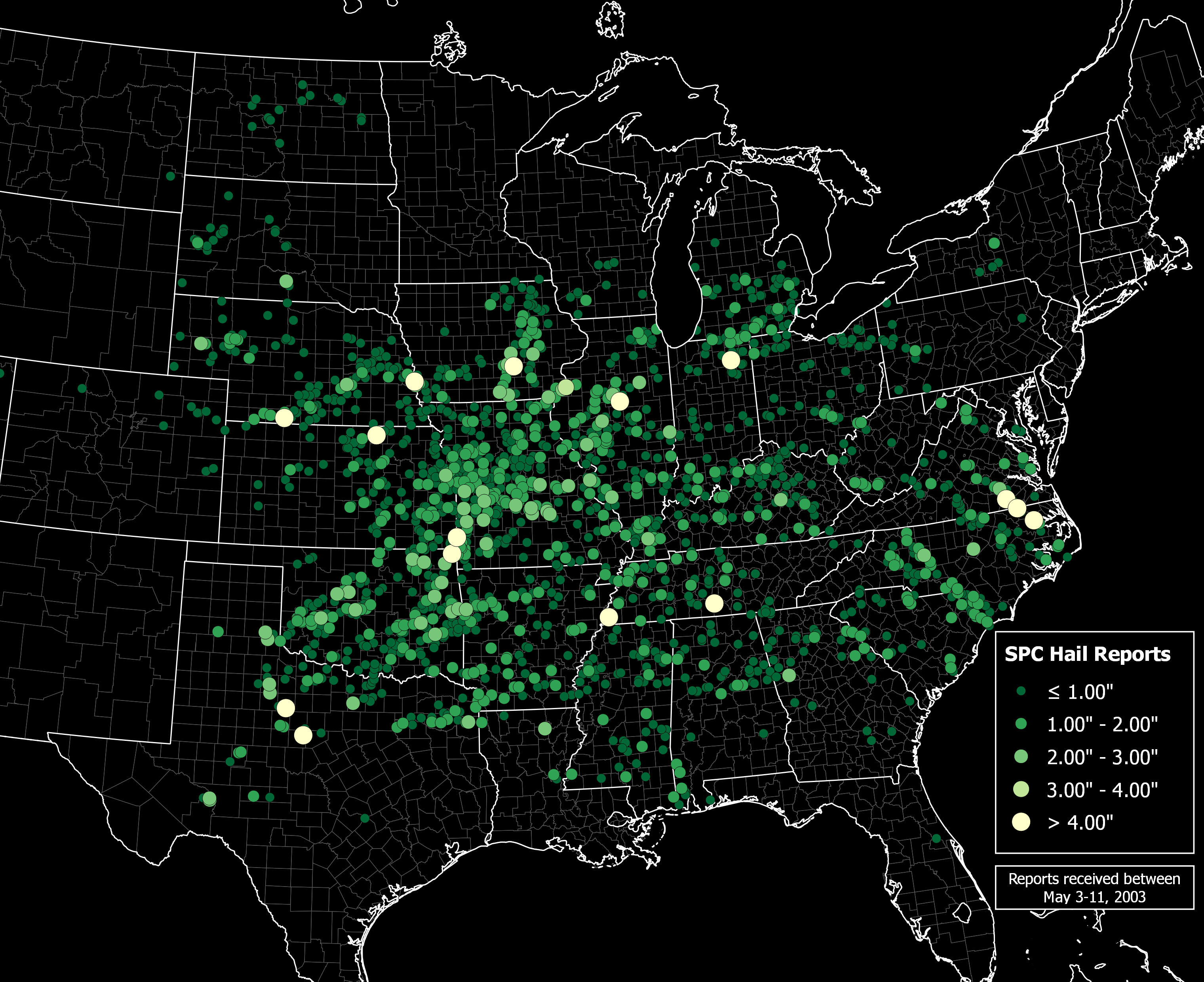
The SPC received 1809 reports of hail, with a maximum occurring in western Missouri

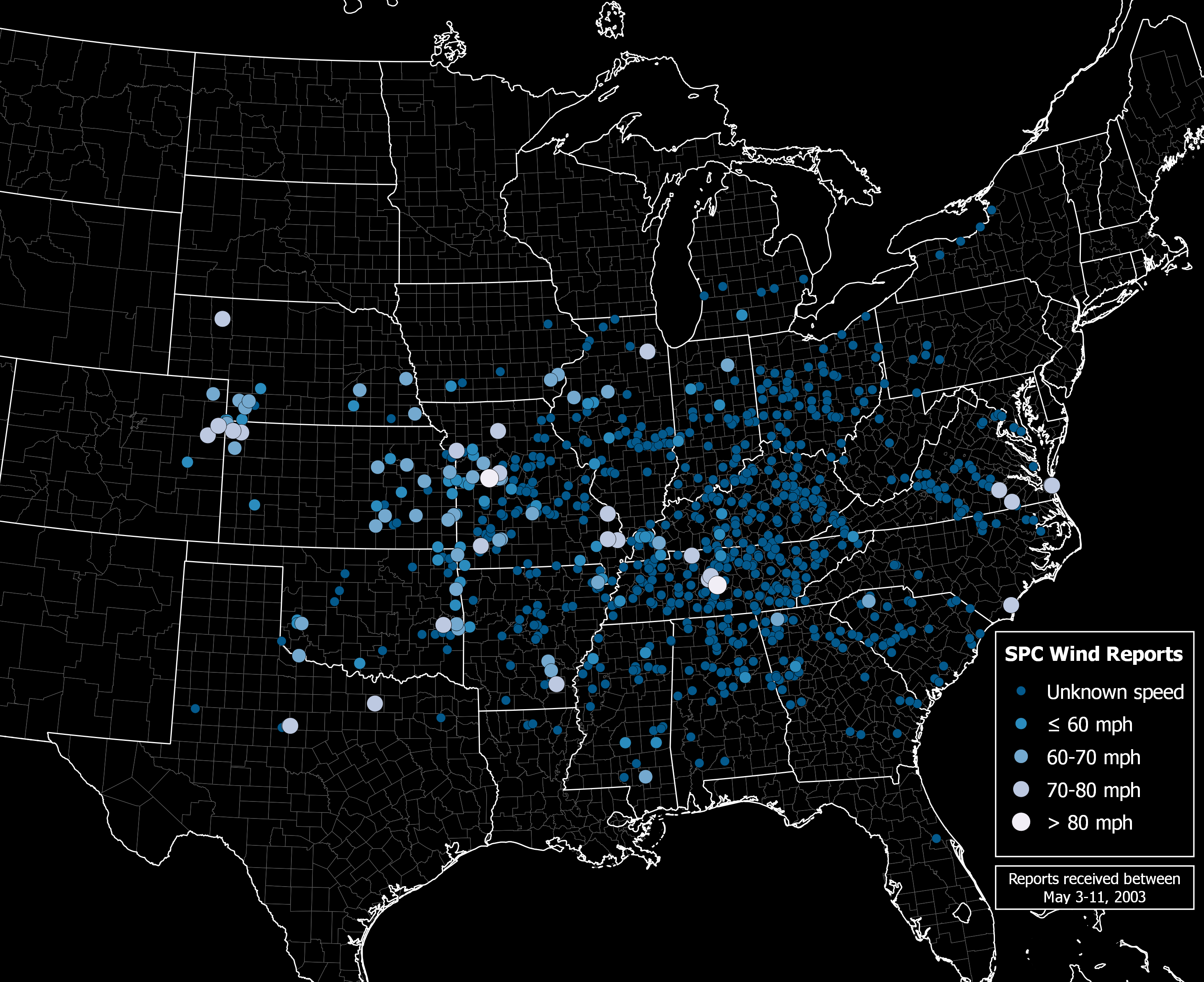
The SPC received 869 reports of strong winds or wind damage, including a maximum of 103 mph at Whiteman Air Force Base in Missouri

== Aftermath ==
FEMA Disaster Declarations
ID	State	Declared	Aid approved	Notes
DR-1462	Kansas	May 5	$8.67 million	
DR-1463	Missouri	May 5	$28.3 million	
DR-1464	Tennessee	May 8	$61 million	
DR-1465	Oklahoma	May 10	$6.67 million	
DR-1466	Alabama	May 12	$62.6 million	
DR-1469	Illinois	May 15	$1.64 million	
DR-1470	Mississippi	May 23	$740,552	

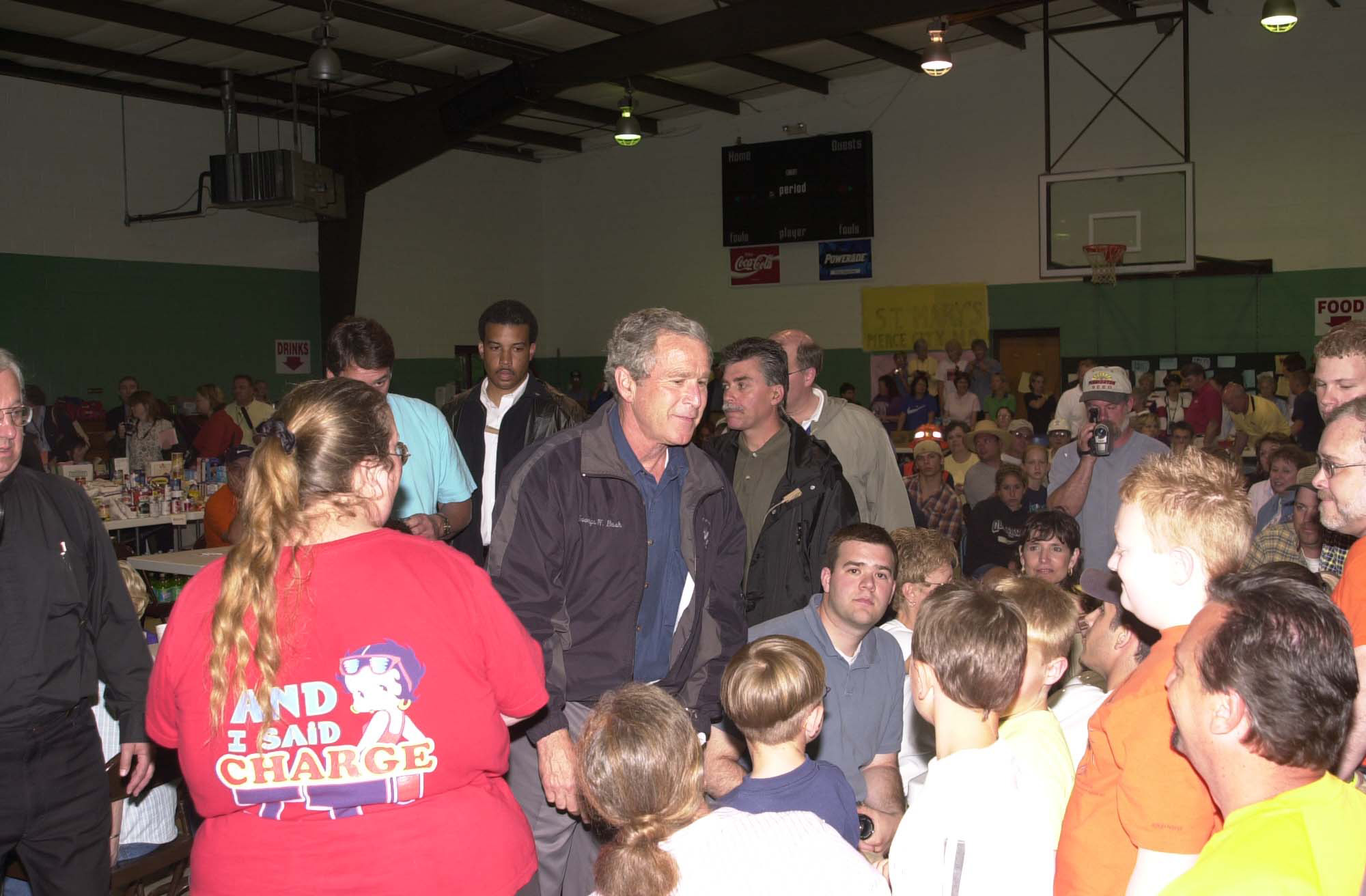
President George W. Bush visiting Pierce City, Missouri, following the tornado outbreak

In the aftermath of the May 4 tornadoes, Missouri governor Bob Holden petitioned the federal government to declare a federal disaster for 39 counties while Kansas governor Kathleen Sebelius issued disaster or emergency declarations for several counties—Cherokee, Crawford, Labette, Leavenworth, Neosho, and Wyandotte; U.S. President George W. Bush later issued federal disaster declarations for these states, authorizing the allocation of federal disaster funds through the Federal Emergency Management Agency (FEMA). FEMA director Michael D. Brown designated Michael J. Hall as the coordinator for federal relief efforts in response to the tornadoes.

Visiting the Northmoor, Missouri, Holden remarked that the damage was "the worst I've seen from a tornado in several years", later noting in during his visit of Pierce City that the May 4 storms were "the most devastating series of tornadoes we've ever had in the state of Missouri". Emergency shelters were opened in Madison County, Tennessee, as the county largely lost access to electricity and water following a May 4 tornado. The American Red Cross of Central Oklahoma sent relief crews and emergency response trucks to Springfield, Missouri, to deliver food and supplies. The Oklahoma City chapter of Feed the Children also dispatched supplies to Kansas City, Missouri. The 203rd Engineer Battalion of the Missouri Army National Guard bound for deployment in the Iraq War aided relief efforts in Pierce City, Missouri.

In 2004, The Storm Prediction Center and five National Weather Service Weather Forecast Offices were awarded the Department of Commerce Gold Medal—the highest award issued by the department—for "providing life-saving services during a record outbreak of tornadoes during the period of May 4–6, 2003".

== See also ==
- List of North American tornadoes and tornado outbreaks
- List of F4 and EF4 tornadoes (2000–2009)
- Tornado outbreak sequence of May 6–27, 1995
- Tornado outbreak of May 2019
- List of tornadoes in Cleveland County, Oklahoma
