= Centenary, Virginia =

Unincorporated community in Virginia, United States

Coordinates: 37°42′34″N 78°30′42″W

Centenary is an unincorporated community in Buckingham County, in the U.S. state of Virginia.
