= K-244 (Kansas highway) =

State highway in Kansas, U.S.

K-244
- K-244 in red, K-244 Spur in blue

Route information
- Maintained by KDOT
- Length: 3.940 mi (6.341 km)
- Existed: June 12, 1964–present

Major junctions
- West end: Milford Lake Road northwest of Junction City
- East end: US-77 / K-57 north of Junction City

Location
- Country: United States
- State: Kansas
- Counties: Geary

Highway system
- Kansas State Highway System; Interstate; US; State; Spurs
← K-243	→ K-245

K-244 is a 3.940-mile-long (6.341 km) east–west state highway in the north-central portion of the U.S. state of Kansas. K-244's western terminus is at Milford Lake Road northwest of Junction City. Milford Lake Road travels south to K-18, then further south to I-70 and US-40 at exit 290. K-244's eastern terminus is at US-77 north of Junction City. The highway serves West Rolling Hills Park and Milford State Park, which are both adjacent to Milford Lake.

K-244 was approved to be constructed on June 12, 1964, by the Kansas State Highway Commission, now known as the Kansas Department of Transportation. The new K-244 was opened in 1967. In a resolution passed on May 10, 1967, it was approved to extend K-57 northward over the Milford Dam and back to US-77. At this time, K-244 Spur was approved to be built.

== Route description ==
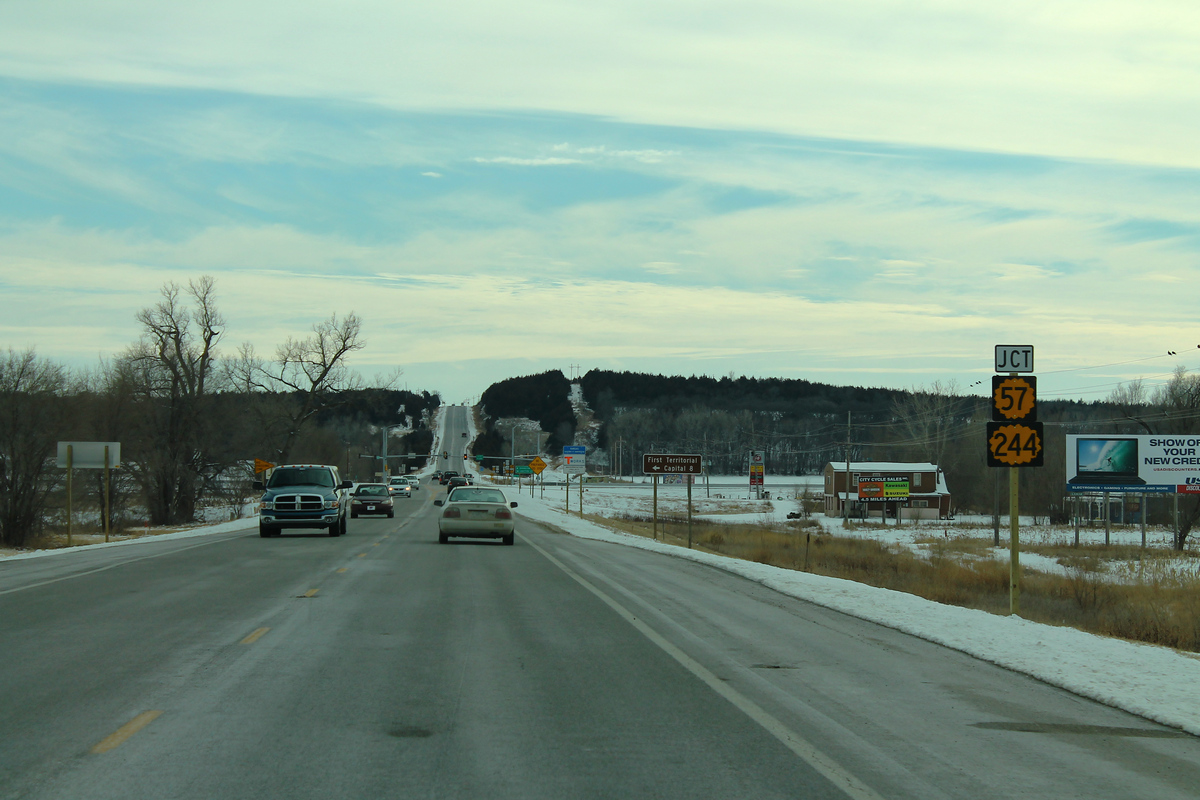
US-77 approaching junction with K-244 and K-57

K-244's western terminus is at Milford Lake Road northwest of Junction City. West of Milford Lake Road, the highway continues as 3200 Avenue. Milford Lake Road travels south to K-18, then further south to I-70 and US-40 at exit 290. K-244 heads east to a junction with West Rolling Hill, which travels north to West Rolling Hills Park. The highway proceeds east, passing by one of the southern legs of Milford Lake, before reaching the southern terminus of K-244 Spur. The spur route allows access from eastbound K-244 to northbound K-57, and from southbound K-57 to westbound K-244, which can't be achieved at the western end of the K-57 and K-244 overlap. K-244 curves northeast then reaches an at-grade intersection with K-57. K-244 begins to overlap K-57 in a southeast direction as a divided four-lane highway. The highway proceeds a short distance then reaches its eastern terminus at US-77 north of Junction City. Past US-77 the highway continues as K-57 southbound.

The Kansas Department of Transportation (KDOT) tracks the traffic levels on its highways. On K-244 in 2020, they determined that on average the traffic varied from 525 vehicles per day near the western terminus to 615 vehicles per day slightly west of K-57. K-244 connects to the National Highway System at its eastern terminus with US-77.

== History ==
K-244 was created by a resolution adopted by the State Highway Commission of Kansas, now known as KDOT, on June 12, 1964. It was created as the most direct route between the existing state highway system and Milford Lake. On January 20, 1966, the SHC opened bids for the construction of the new highway. On February 3, 1966, the SHC announced an approved bid of $1,959,798 (equivalent to $14.4 million in 2024 dollars) for grading the new K-244 as well as the relocation of US-77 and K-82. Also, a bid of $19,984 (equivalent to $147,159 in 2024 dollars) was approved for a bridge on the new K-244. The new K-244 was opened in 1967.

In a resolution passed on May 10, 1967, it was approved to extend K-57 northward over the Milford Dam and back to US-77. At this time, K-244 Spur was approved to be built. In May 1968, work began to build the extension of K-57 over the dam. The project was completed by 1969. In July 1970, the SHC announced that flashing warning beacons will be added at the junction of K-57, K-244 and US-77. This was due to numerous accidents at the site including six being killed in one month. In addition to the flashing lights, the speed limit was lowered on K-57 and US-77 leading up to the intersection.

== Major intersections ==
The entire route is in Smoky Hill Township, Geary County.

mi	km	Destinations	Notes
0.000	0.000	3200 Avenue	Continuation past western terminus
0.000	0.000	To I-70 / Milford Lake Road – Milford Wildlife Area	Western terminus
2.229	3.587	K-244 Spur	Southern terminus of K-244 Spur
3.940	6.341	K-57 north	West end of K-57 concurrency; no eastbound access to K-57 north, no westbound access from K-57 south
4.306	6.930	K-57 south / US-77 – Junction City, Marysville, Herington	Eastern terminus; east end of K-57 concurrency; road continues as K-57 south
1.000 mi = 1.609 km; 1.000 km = 0.621 mi: Concurrency terminus

== Spur route ==
K-244 Spur
- Location: NW of Junction City
- Length: 0.800 mi (1,287 m)
- Existed: May 10, 1967–present

K-244 Spur is a 4/5-mile-long (1.3 km), north–south marked spur that links K-244 to K-57 northwest of Junction City and slightly south of the Milford Lake dam. The highway allows access from eastbound K-244 to northbound K-57, and from southbound K-57 to westbound K-244. K-244 Spur begins at K-244 and meanders in northeast direction to K-57. On K-244 Spur in 2020, KDOT determined that on average the traffic was 115 vehicles per day.

In a resolution passed on May 10, 1967, it was approved to extend K-57 northward over the Milford Dam and back to US-77. At this time, K-244 Spur was approved to be built. The project was completed by 1969. On July 21, 1993, floodwaters washed out a 175-foot-long (53 m) section of K-244 Spur down to the bedrock. The highway was reopened in mid-October 1993.

Major intersections

The entire route is in Smoky Hill Township, Geary County.

mi	km	Destinations	Notes
0.000	0.000	K-244 to US-77 / K-57	Southern terminus
0.800	1.287	K-57 to US-77 – Junction City	Northern terminus
1.000 mi = 1.609 km; 1.000 km = 0.621 mi

== Gallery ==
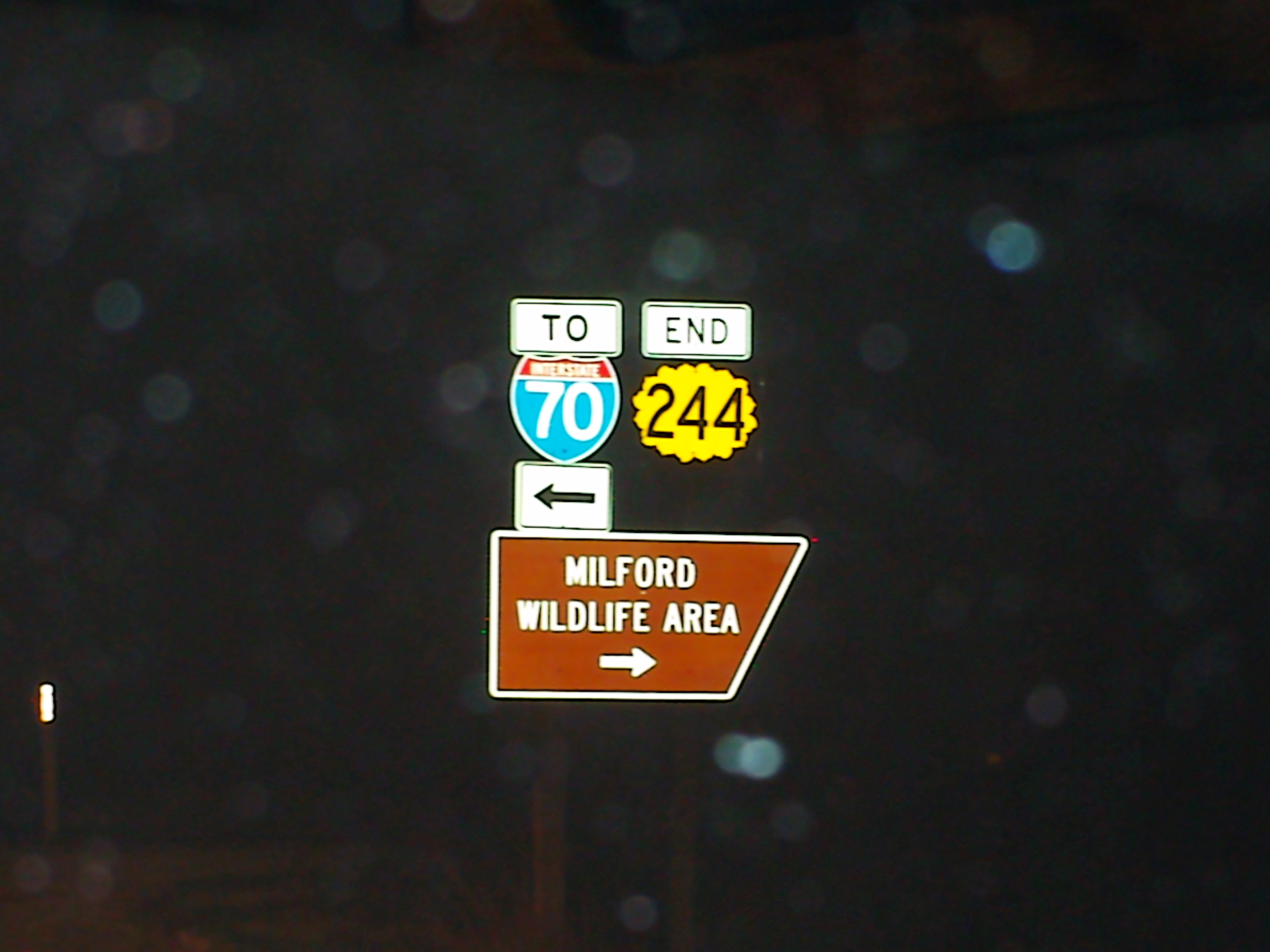
Western end

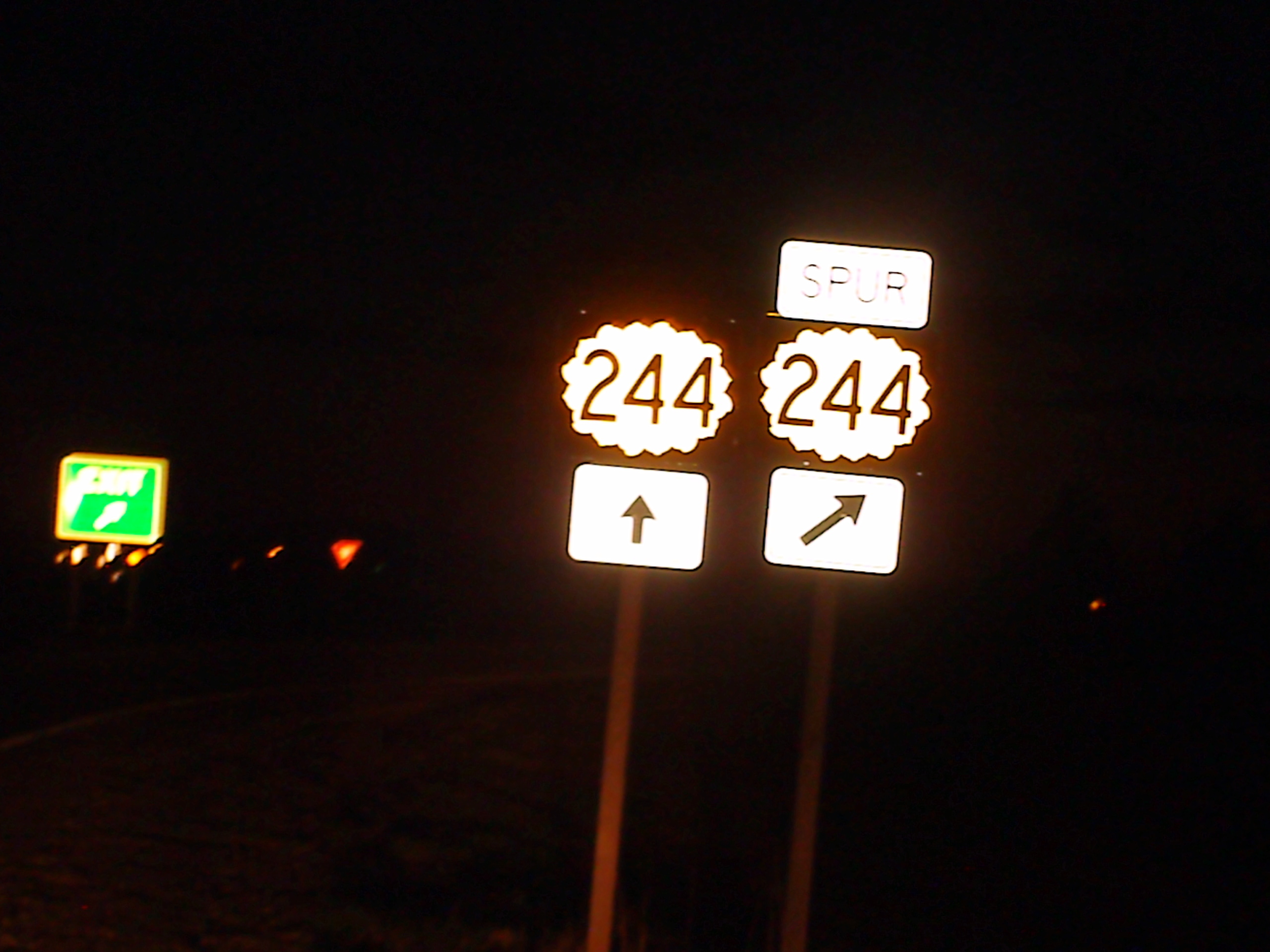
K-244/K-244 spur split

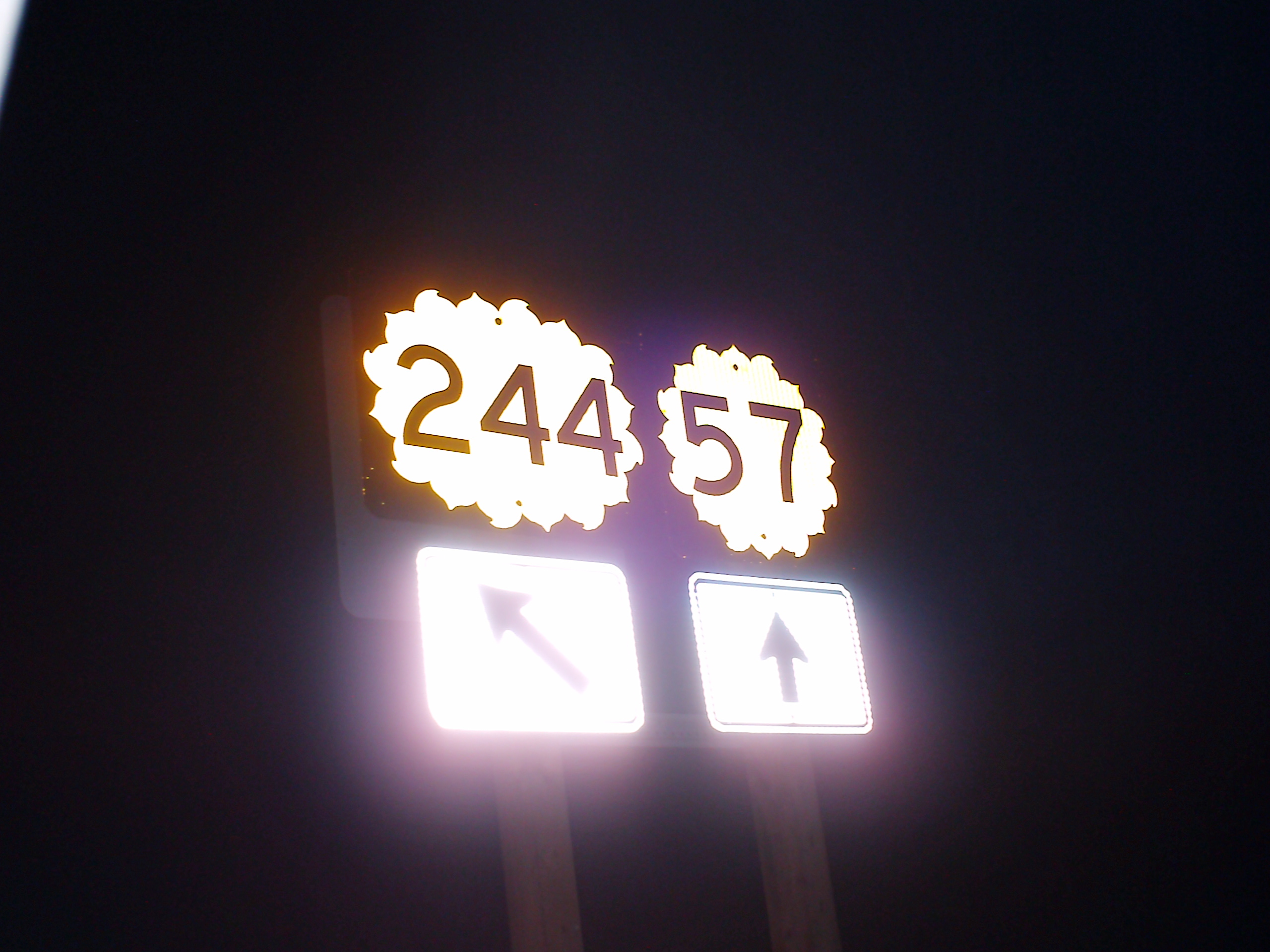
Eastern end
