= K-57 (Kansas highway) =

State highway in Kansas, U.S.

K-57
- K-57 highlighted in red

Route information
- Maintained by KDOT and the city of Junction City
- Length: 31.200 mi (50.212 km)
- Existed: 1926–present
- History: Shortened to current length on September 20, 2004

Major junctions
- South end: K-4 in Dwight
- I-70 / US-40 / K-18 / US 40 Bus. in Grandview Plaza; US-77 / K-244 north of Junction City
- North end: US-77 north of Junction City

Location
- Country: United States
- State: Kansas
- Counties: Geary, Morris

Highway system
- Kansas State Highway System; Interstate; US; State; Spurs
← US-56	→ K-58

K-57 is a 31.2-mile-long (50.2 km) north–south state highway in the U.S. state of Kansas. K-57's southern terminus is at K-4 in Dwight. The northern terminus is at U.S. Route 77 (US-77) north of Junction City. The highway intersects Interstate 70 (I-70) in Grandview Plaza; at the intersection, I-70 is also the route of US-40 and K-18. K-57 overlaps US-40 Business (US-40 Bus.) from I-70 northbound to North Washington Street in Junction City. North of Junction City, the highway passes through Milford State Park where it crosses the Milford Lake Dam. The majority of the highway is two-lanes except for the section from J Hill Road in Grandview Plaza to the junction with K-244 which is four-lanes.

K-57 was established as a state highway by 1926. It began in Alta Vista and traveled south through Council Grove to Cottonwood Falls. The highway headed east through Emporia then curved southeast toward Burlington. It continued southeast from Burlington through Neosho Falls to Iola. K-57 then traveled south toward Chanute, after which it turned east. The highway continued east through Erie, St. Paul and Girard then turned south toward Pittsburg. At Pittsburg, K-57 turned east and continued through Opolis to the Missouri border. By 1927, K-57 was extended northeast from Alta Vista to Junction City. By 1928, K-57 was changed to travel north from Cottonwood Falls to Strong City then east to Emporia. By 1952, K-57 was rerouted south from Emporia along K-99 to Madison then east to meet its old alignment south of Burlington. In a resolution passed on May 10, 1967, it was approved to extend K-57 across the Milford Lake Dam to its current northern terminus. It was approved to truncate K-57 to end at US-169 by Colony in a resolution on May 14, 2003. In a resolution approved on September 20, 2004, K-57 was truncated to its current southern terminus.

== Route description ==
K-57's southern terminus is at K-4, also known as South Street, in Dwight in Morris County. The highway heads north along Seventh Street and has an at-grade crossing with two Union Pacific Railroad tracks before exiting the city. The roadway soon crosses over Lairds Creek and passes Dwight Cemetery as it enters into Geary County. K-57 continues north to Garansan Road, where it curves west. The highway proceeds west to Stahl Road where it curves north. The highway curves northwest and begins parallelling East Branch Dry Creek. The roadway continues to a junction with Carr Road, just north of the confluence of east and west branches of Dry Creek. K-57 continues to meander in a northwest direction parallel to Dry Creek. The roadway soon curves west and crosses over Clarks Creek and intersects Clarks Creek Road. The highway continues northwest and soon enters the city of Grandview Plaza. K-57 then reaches a partial interchange with an eastbound entrance and westbound exit for I-70, which is concurrent with US-40 and K-18. At this point K-57 begins to overlap with US-40 Business (US-40 Bus.). Just past the interchange, the highway turns west and begins to parallel I-70. The highway then reaches a junction with J Hill Road, which provides access to westbound I-70/US-40/K-18.

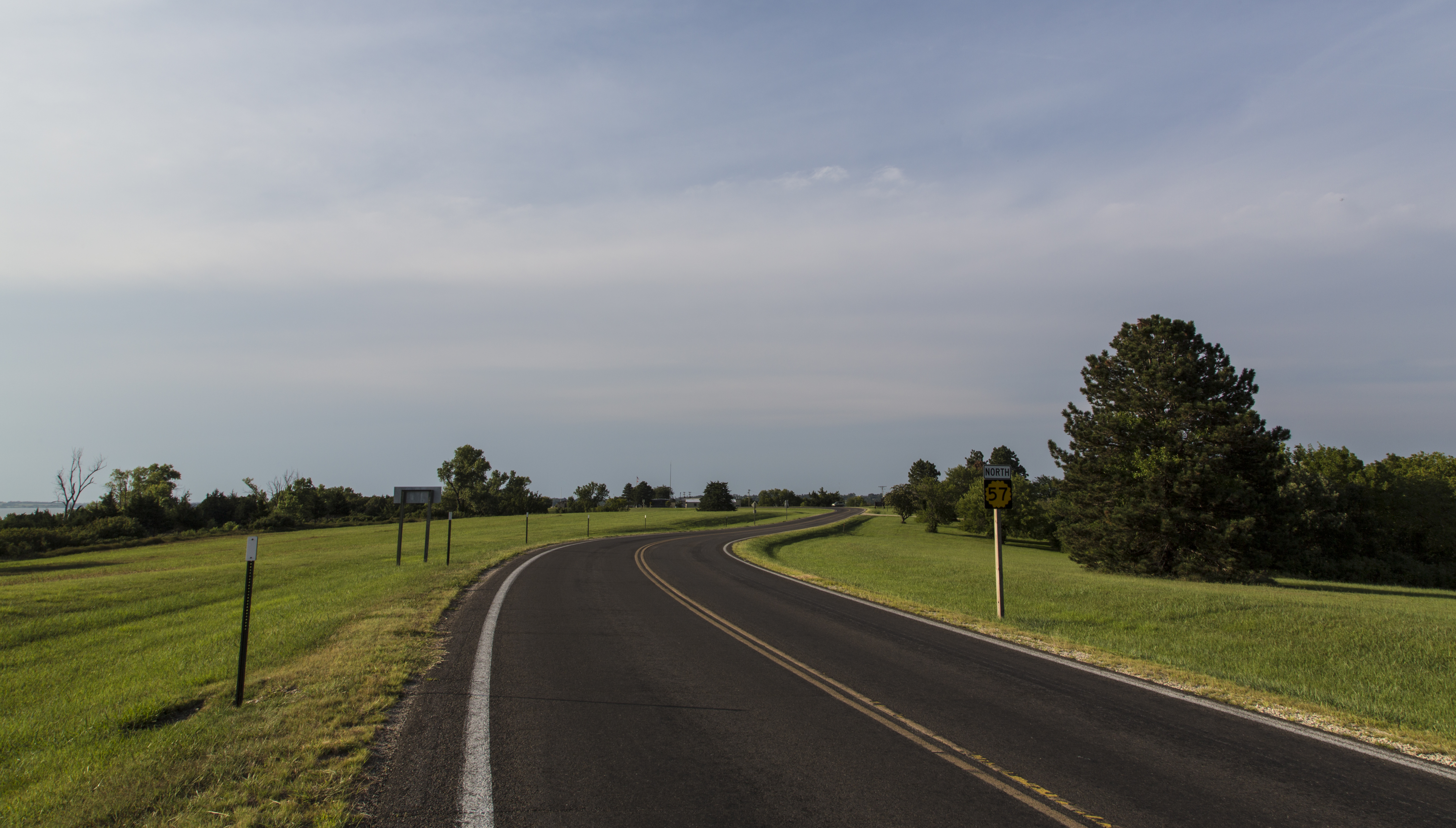
K-57 in Milford State Park

K-57 and US-40 Bus. transition to four lanes, and then exit the city as they cross the Smoky Hill River. The highway soon enters Junction City as 6th Street. The roadway proceeds west and crosses over a railroad track then reaches North Washington Street. At this point, K-57 turns north and US-40 Bus. splits off to the south. K-57 continues north to Grant Avenue, where it turns west. The roadway then reaches North Jackson Street, where it turns north and soon exits the city. The four-lane highway becomes a divided highway as it curves northwest. The divided section ends as it meets an at-grade intersection with US-77, which also is the eastern terminus of K-244. The latter highway begins to overlap K-57 as it continues northwest and becomes divided again. The roadway continues for roughly 0.4 miles (0.64 km) before K-244 turns west. Here only K-57 northbound can access K-244 westbound. K-57 continues northeast as it reduces to two lanes. The roadway curves west and then intersects K-244 Spur. K-57 then curves north, and crosses the dam which impounds Milford Lake. From here, the highway gradually curves northeast, before reaching its northern terminus at US-77 north of Junction City.

The Kansas Department of Transportation (KDOT) tracks the traffic levels on its highways. In 2024, annual average daily traffic volumes varied from 250 vehicles per day slightly south of Garansan Road to over 10,000 vehicles per day by Grant Avenue. KDOT maintains the majority of the highway except for the section within Junction City, which is maintained by the city.

== History ==
=== Establishment ===
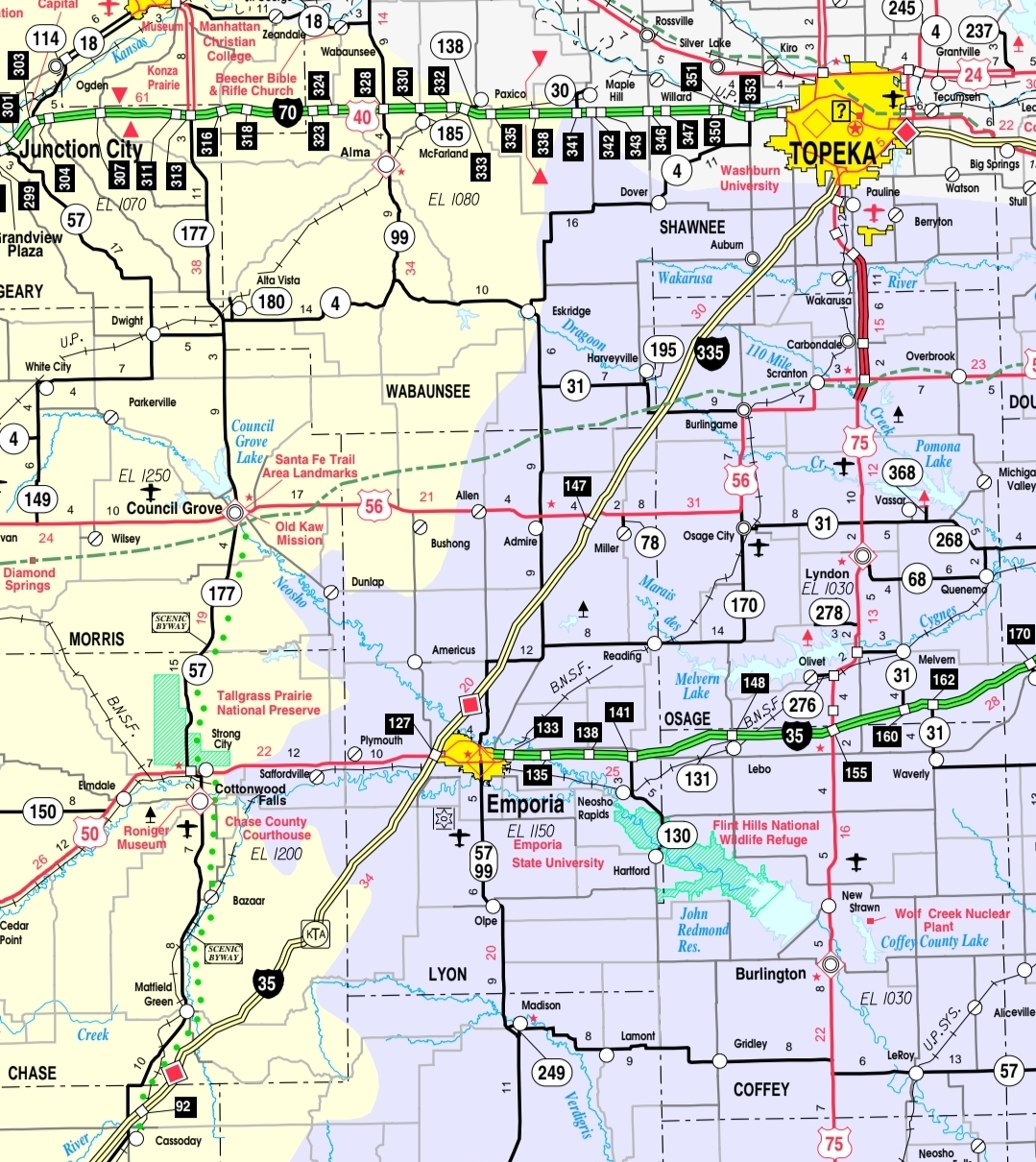
2001 alignment from Dwight to Leroy

K-57 was established as a state highway by the State Highaway Commission of Kansas (SHC), now known as KDOT, in 1926. From its western terminus in Alta Vista, it traveled south to US-50 and K-4 in Council Grove. The highway continued south to US-250 in Cottonwood Falls. K-57 followed US-250 east to slightly east of Emporia, where it left US-250. The highway continued southeast to Burlington where it intersected US-75. It continued southeast through Neosho Falls to K-16 and US-54 in Iola. K-57 then began to follow K-16 south through Chanute, then turned east and left K-16. The highway continued through Erie and St. Paul to K-7 in Girard. K-57 continued east to K-5 where it turned south. At Pittsburg, K-57 turned east and continued through Opolis and then entered Missouri, becoming Missouri Route 57.

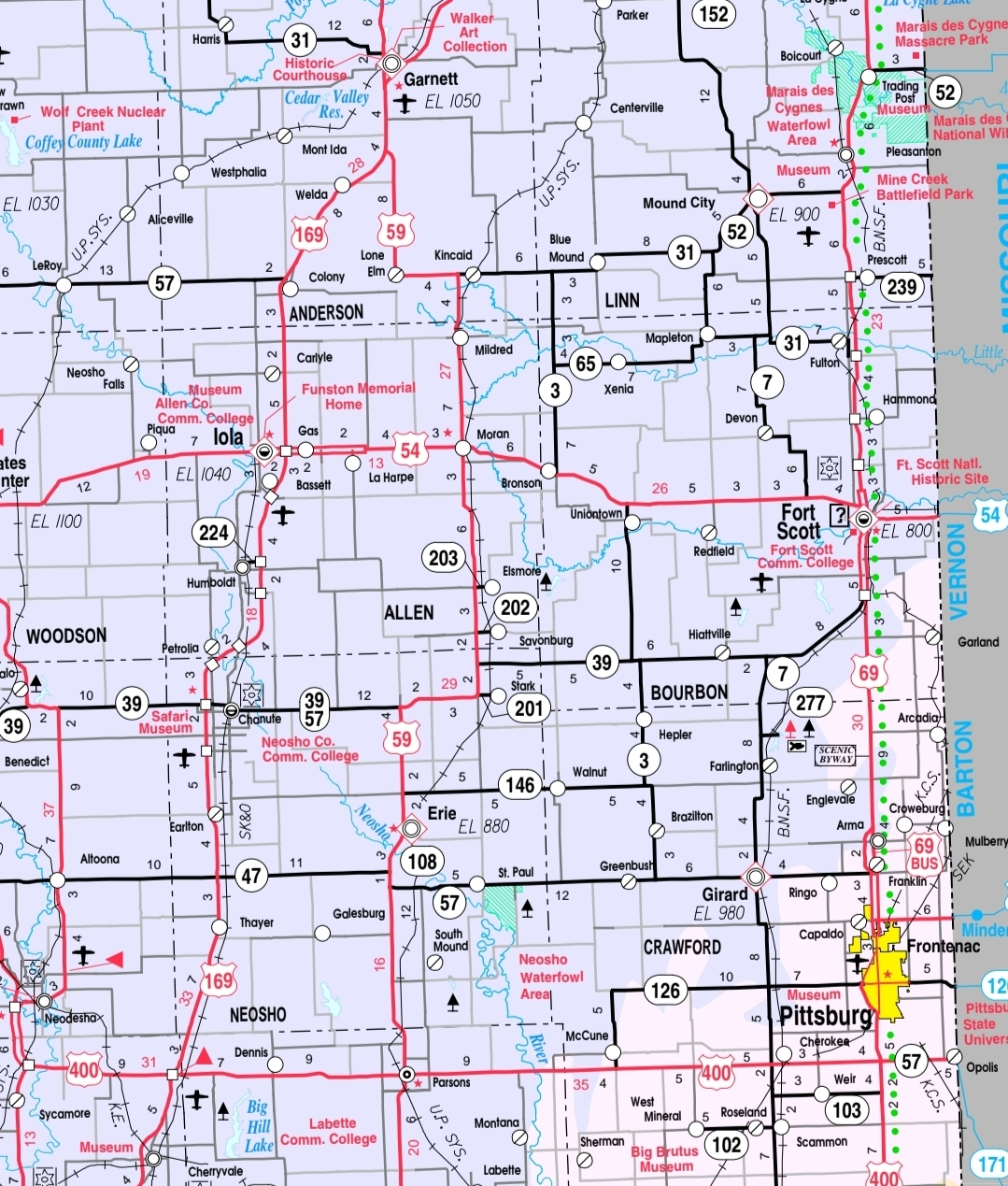
2001 alignment from Leroy to Missouri state line

By 1927, K-57 was extended northeast from Alta Vista to US-77 in Junction City. Also by 1927, US-50 was renumbered as US-50N, US-250 was renumbered as US-50S, K-16 was truncated to end at K-57 and the remainder was renumbered as US-73W, and K-5 was renumbered as US-73E. By 1928, the alignment of US-50S and K-57 was changed to travel north from Cottonwood Falls to Strong City then east to Emporia. Also by 1928, K-13 was extended northward and overlapped K-57 from Strong City to Alta Vista. Between 1933 and 1934, US-73W was redesignated as US-59 and US-73E was redesignated as US-69.

=== Realignments and improvements ===
In October 1947, a five-mile-long (8.0 km) section of K-57 reopened west of St. Paul. The highway had been closed for two years when a new bridge over Flat Rock Creek was being built and the grade elevated. A temporary sealer was added to the roadway to make it through the winter. The next year the road was closed again briefly so it could be paved. From 1949 to early-1950, the section of K-57 between US-75 and US-59 was improved. The roadway was brought to standard grade and raised above flood levels. In the summer of 1950, that section was paved. In a resolution passed on October 24, 1950, it was approved to extend K-18 east, from US-77, to K-13 by the Geary–Wabaunsee county line. K-57 was moved onto a portion of the new alignment, which moved the crossing over the Smoky Hill river slightly north. K-18 was opened from Junction City to where K-57 turns south by the end of October 1952. The remainder from K-57 to K-13 opened the next month.

K-57 had originally traveled east out of Emporia. At the beginning of March 1951, it was announced that K-57 might be rerouted to travel south from Emporia to Madison, then east toward Colony. By the next year, it had been rerouted south from Emporia along K-99 to Madison then east to meet its old alignment south of Burlington. The former section of K-57 from east of Emporia south to Hartford remained a state highway and was redesignated as K-130. On October 3, 1951, the SHC asked for bids to realign K-57 and K-13 from one mile (1.6 km) south of Chase-Morris county line north to three miles (4.8 km) south of Council Grove. The new route eliminated 14 turns and included a 216-foot-long (66 m) bridge over Four Mile Creek and a 26-foot-wide (7.9 m) roadway. The realignments were completed the next year. On November 15, 1951, a tire blew on a gas transport truck which caused it to crash into a bridge on K-57 between Pittsburg and Girard. Roughly 5,500 US gallons (21,000 L) of gas caught on fire and burned from 4 am to 8 am. The intense heat cracked the bridge floor, which caused KDOT to condemn the bridge.

In a resolution passed on January 27, 1956, it was approved to realign K-4 along former K-10 from Herington east to K-99, then along K-99 to Eskridge where it resumed it current course east. This created a short overlap between K-4 and K-57 from Dwight to south of Alta Vista. K-4 had previously crossed K-57 further south in Council Grove. In a resolution passed on September 24, 1958, it was approved to build the portion of I-70 along the south side of Junction City. In the beginning of November 1958, the SHC approved bids to build the section of I-70 along the south side of Junction City. Included in the project was an interchange between K-57 and I-70. On October 9, 1959, the section of I-70 opened from Junction City west to Abilene through a ribbon cutting ceremony.

In mid-September 1968, a $150,000 widening project of K-57 within St. Paul gained support when the city received a $75,000 credit from the SHC. On January 21, 1971, the SHC asked for bids to widen the highway to four-lanes within the city. In mid-April 1971, the Southeastern Kansas Gas Company announced it would be suspending service to St. Paul due to a lack of a franchise with the city. They stated that without a franchise they could not afford to move the gas lines for the K-57 widening. The city offered to replace the lines if the gas company purchased the pipes. The gas company declined and wanted the city to pay for the pipes as well. In early-March 1971, the SHC asked for bids to pave the new widened highway. On March 18, the SHC accepted a bid of $293,469.70 for the paving job.

=== Extensions and truncations ===
K-244 was created in a resolution passed on June 12, 1964. It was created as the most direct route between the existing state highway system and Milford Lake. In a resolution passed on May 10, 1967, it was approved to extend K-57 northwest across the Milford Lake Dam and then intersect with US-77 again further north. In May 1968, work began on the extension of K-57. In July 1970, the SHC announced that flashing warning beacons would be added at the junction of K-57, K-244 and US-77. This was due to numerous accidents at the site including six being killed in one month. In addition to the flashing lights, the speed limit was lowered on K-57 and US-77 leading up to the intersection. On September 1, 1967, an improved section of K-57 was opened from Girard westward for 11 miles (18 km). In early-June and early-December 1969, public hearings were held in Pittsburg to talk about improvements to be made to K-57 between US-69 and the Missouri border. The roadway was to be widened to 24 feet (7.3 m) and a 10 feet (3.0 m) shoulder added on each side. The project also included construction of five new bridges. On September 11, 1972, the new section was opened through a ribbon cutting ceremony.

In a resolution passed on May 9, 1973, it was approved to realign K-18 onto I-70 and US-40, which removed the overlap between K-18 and K-57. US-40 Business and US-77 Business were approved in Junction City in an American Association of State Highway and Transportation Officials (AASHTO) meeting on October 13, 1979. US-77 Bus. followed K-57 from 6th Street north to US-77 and US-40 Bus. followed K-57 from Washington Street east to US-40 and I-70. In an AASHTO meeting on December 2, 1988, it was approved to eliminate the US-77 Business route. In a resolution on May 14, 2003, it was approved to truncate K-57 to end at US-169 by Colony. At this time K-47 was extended east over the former section of K-57 from US-59 south of Erie to US-69 by Franklin. The former section of K-57 between US-69 and the Missouri border was renumbered as K-171. In a resolution on September 20, 2004, K-57 was truncated to its current southern terminus, and the former section of K-57 between K-99 by Madison and US-169 by Colony was redesignated as K-58.

== Major junctions ==
County	Location	mi	km	Destinations	Notes
Morris	Dwight	0.000	0.000	K-4 – Herington, Council Grove, Eskridge	Southern terminus; road continues south as K-4 west
Geary	Grandview Plaza	19.623	31.580	I-70 / US-40 / K-18 east / US 40 Bus. west – Topeka	Southern end of US-40 Bus. overlap; no access to I-70/US-40/K-18 west; I-70 exit 300
Geary	Grandview Plaza	20.523	33.029	To I-70 / US-40 / K-18 – Salina, Topeka via J Hill Road	To I-70 exit 299
Geary	Junction City	22.126	35.608	US 40 Bus. west (Washington Street south)	Northern end of US-40 Bus. overlap
Geary		25.785	41.497	K-244 west / US-77 – Herington, Marysville	Eastern terminus of K-244; southern end of K-244 overlap
Geary		26.151	42.086	K-244 west	Northern end of K-244 overlap; no southbound access to K-244 west, no northbound access from K-244 east
Geary		27.552	44.341	K-244 Spur south	Northern terminus of K-244 Spur
Geary		31.200	50.212	US-77 – Marysville, Junction City	Northern terminus
1.000 mi = 1.609 km; 1.000 km = 0.621 mi: Concurrency terminus
