= K-18 (Kansas highway) =

State highway in Kansas, U.S.

K-18
- K-18 highlighted in red

Route information
- Maintained by KDOT and the city of Manhattan
- Length: 205.999 mi (331.523 km)
- Existed: 1926–present

Major junctions
- West end: US-24 near Bogue
- US-183 in Plainville; US-281 from east of Paradise to Luray; US-81 west of Bennington; US-77 in Junction City; I-70 / US-40 from Junction City to Grandview Plaza; K-177 in Manhattan
- East end: K-99 south of Wamego

Location
- Country: United States
- State: Kansas
- Counties: Graham, Rooks, Osborne, Russell, Lincoln, Ottawa, Dickinson, Geary, Riley, Wabaunsee

Highway system
- Kansas State Highway System; Interstate; US; State; Spurs
← K-17	→ K-19
← K-28	→ K-30

K-18 is a 206-mile (332 km), west–east state highway in the U.S. State of Kansas. K-18's western terminus is at U.S. Route 24 (US-24) near Bogue and the eastern terminus is at K-99 south of Wamego. Portions of the highway have been upgraded to a freeway beginning in 2012.

K-18 from US-81 to the western boundary of Lincoln County has been designated "Medal of Honor Recipient Donald K. Ross Memorial Highway".

== Route description ==
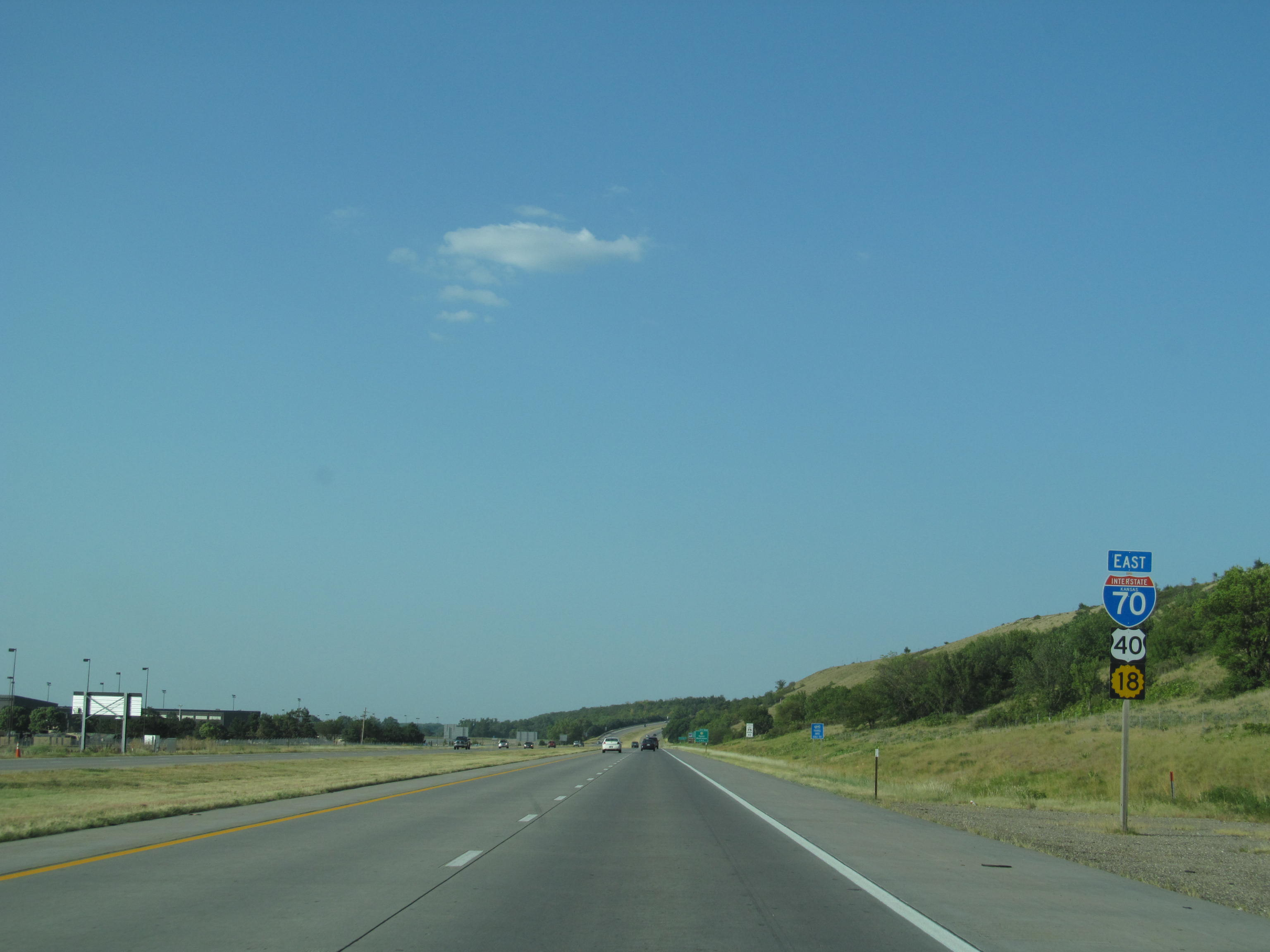
K-18 eastbound overlapped with I-70 and US-40

K-18 begins near the town of Bogue in Graham County as it branches off to the south from US-24. The highway then stairsteps to the southeast through the towns of Damar, Palco, Plainville, and Codell in Rooks County; Natoma in Osborne County; Paradise, Waldo, Luray, and Lucas in Russell County (K-18 is duplexed with US-281 for 9 miles (14 km) west of Luray); and Sylvan Grove, Lincoln, and Beverly in Lincoln County. As K-18 enters Ottawa County, it takes a due east bearing, traveling through Tescott and meeting US-81 north of Salina. The road briefly jogs to the north for around 2 miles (3.2 km) before turning east again to travel through Bennington and Talmage in Dickinson County and into Junction City in Geary County. In Junction City, K-18 meets US-77 and travels south along US-77 through the city until it hits I-70. K-18 then travels to the northeast along I-70 for eight miles (13 km) before exiting and continuing to the northeast toward Manhattan as a freeway. K-18 crosses the Kansas River at the Riley County line and travels through Ogden into Manhattan. Once traveling through Manhattan, K-18 again crosses the Kansas River and parallels the river to the south into Wabaunsee County before ending at K-99 south of Wamego.

The section of K-18 from just east of the interchange with K-113 to K-177 within Manhattan is maintained by the city.

== History ==
K-29
- Existed: 1927–1960

K-18 was first designated as a state highway in 1926, and ran from US-40 (now US-24) to US-81 north of Salina. In 1936, it extended to US-77 in Junction City. In 1953, it extended to K-13. In 1960, it extended east over cancelled K-29 to K-99.

=== Realignments ===
In a November 23, 1955 resolution, a 0.246 miles (0.396 km) spur route of K-18 was built on the western side of Manhattan. Then in a November 14, 1956 resolution, the new alignment of K-18 was to be built from the western end of the spur westward.

In a resolution on May 9, 1973, it was approved to realign K-18 onto I-70 and US-40, which removed the overlap between K-18 and K-57. The former section of K-18 from Ogden northeast to the new K-18 was redesignated as K-114. K-114 was proposed to remove K-18 from its course through Fort Riley in favor of a route around the military base between Ogden and Junction City to separate military traffic and regular highway traffic. K-18 would be placed on its present corridor from just east of Ogden south to I-70, and the piece of K-18 between the city of Ogden and the new portion of K-18 would become K-114. The junction of K-18 and K-114 would be a partial interchange featuring a flyover ramp for westbound K-18 and no access from K-114 to westbound K-18 or from eastbound K-18 to K-114. K-114 was established when construction on the K-18 link between Ogden and I-70 was completed between 1975 and 1977. Between 2010 and 2013, K-18 and K-114 were relocated and their present interchange was constructed.

The section of K-18 from I-70 in Grandview Plaza to K-113 in Manhattan has been rebuilt into a limited-access divided freeway, a project that began in 2012.

On April 5, 2017, work began to convert the interchange with K-113 in Manhattan into a diverging diamond interchange. The $2.587 million project (equivalent to $3.25 million in 2024), completed by Amino Brothers Co. Inc. out of Kansas City, was completed and open to traffic in December 2017.

== Junction list ==
County	Location	mi	km	Exit	Destinations	Notes
Graham		0.000	0.000		US-24 – Hill City, Nicodemus, Stockton	Western terminus
Rooks	Plainville	26.958	43.385		US-183 (Washington Street) – Stockton, Hays	
Osborne	No major junctions					
Russell		54.523	87.746		US-281 south – Russell	Western end of US-281 concurrency
Russell	Luray	63.035	101.445		US-281 north – Osborne	Eastern end of US-281 concurrency
Russell	Lucas	73.945	119.003		K-232 south (Post Rock Scenic Byway) to I-70	Northern terminus of K-232
Lincoln		81.368	130.949		K-181 – Downs, Sylvan Grove	
Lincoln	Lincoln	94.828	152.611		K-14 – Beloit, Ellsworth	
Lincoln	Tescott	105.296	169.457		K-252 south – Beverly	Northern terminus of K-252
Ottawa		119.008	191.525		K-106 east – Minneapolis	Western terminus of K-106
Ottawa		123.461	198.691		US-81 (Frank Carlson Memorial Highway) – Concordia, Salina	Interchange
Dickinson		148.759	239.404		K-15 south – Abilene	Western end of K-15 concurrency
Dickinson		152.725	245.787		K-15 north – Clay Center	Eastern end of K-15 concurrency
Geary	Junction City	166.971	268.714		US-77 north / 8th Street east – Marysville	Interchange; western end of K-77 concurrency
Geary	Junction City	169.123	272.177		I-70 west / US-40 west (Dwight D. Eisenhower Highway west) / US-77 south – Salina, Herington	I-70 exit 295; eastern end of US-77 concurrency; western end of I-70/US-40 concurrency
Geary	Junction City	170.710	274.731	296	US 40 Bus. east (Washington Street)	Exit numbers follow I-70
Geary	Junction City	172.068	276.917	298	East Street / Chestnut Street	
Geary	Grandview Plaza	172.775	278.054	299	J Hill Road to Flinthills Boulevard (US 40 Bus. / K-57)	
Geary	Grandview Plaza	173.975	279.986	300	US 40 Bus. west / K-57 – Council Grove	No westbound entrance
Geary		174.868	281.423	301	Fort Riley, Marshall Field	
Geary		177.054	284.941		I-70 east / US-40 east – Topeka	I-70 exit 303; eastern end of I-70/US-40 concurrency
Geary					Boller Road	At-grade intersection; west end of freeway
Kansas River		179.774	289.318	Bridge		
Riley	Fort Riley	180.503	290.491	—	12th Street	
Riley	Ogden	182.123	293.099	—	K-114 west	Eastern terminus of K-114
Riley		183.374	295.112	—	56th Avenue	Serves Manhattan Regional Airport
Riley		185.674	298.813	—	Scenic Drive	
Riley	Manhattan	187.923	302.433	—	Miller Parkway / Davis Drive	
Riley	Manhattan	188.642	303.590	—	K-113 north (Seth Child Road) / Canyon Drive	Southern terminus of K-113; diverging diamond interchange
Riley	Manhattan	189.245	304.560		Rosecutter Road south / Richards Drive north	At-grade intersection; east end of freeway
Riley	Manhattan	191.357	307.959		K-177 north (Fort Riley Boulevard) to US-24 (Tuttle Creek Boulevard) – Kansas State University	Western end of K-177 concurrency
Riley	Manhattan	191.357	307.959		Pierre Street west	Interchange; westbound left exit and eastbound left entrance
Riley	Manhattan	191.937	308.893		K-177 south – Council Grove	Eastern end of K-177 concurrency
Wabaunsee		205.999	331.523		K-99 – Wamego, Alma	Eastern terminus; road continues as Mt. Mitchell Road
1.000 mi = 1.609 km; 1.000 km = 0.621 mi: Concurrency terminus; Incomplete access

== See also ==
- List of state highways in Kansas
