= Smoky Hill =

Smoky Hill can refer to:

- Smoky Hill City, Kansas
- Smoky Hill River
- Smoky Hill Township (disambiguation)
- Smoky Hill High School Aurora, Colorado

== See also ==
- Smoky Hills, a region of hills, mostly in Kansas, through which the Smoky Hill River flows
