= K-15 (Kansas highway) =

State highway in Kansas, U.S.

K-15
- Eisenhower Memorial Highway
- K-15 highlighted in red

Route information
- Maintained by KDOT and the cities of Winfield, Mulvane, Derby, Wichita, Newton, Abilene, and Clay Center
- Length: 257.141 mi (413.828 km)

Major junctions
- South end: SH-18 southeast of Dexter
- I-35 / Kansas Turnpike in Wichita; I-135 / US-81 from Wichita to Newton; US-50 in Newton; I-70 / US-40 in Abilene; US-24 in Clay Center; US-36 in Washington
- North end: N-15 north of Morrowville

Location
- Country: United States
- State: Kansas
- Counties: Cowley, Sumner, Sedgwick, Harvey, Marion, Dickinson, Clay, Washington

Highway system
- Kansas State Highway System; Interstate; US; State; Spurs
← K-14	→ K-16

K-15 is a 257.141-mile-long (413.828 km) north–south state highway in the U.S. State of Kansas. Originating at the Oklahoma state line as a continuation of State Highway 18 and continuing to the Nebraska state line where it continues as Nebraska Highway 15. Throughout Kansas, it is signed as the Eisenhower Memorial Highway due to its route through Abilene, where the Eisenhower Memorial Museum and Library is located.

== Route description ==
From the Oklahoma state line, K-15 runs north for 8 miles (13 km) before turning west for 4 miles (6.4 km) and overlapping US-166. It then returns to a due north course for 9 miles (14 km) to Dexter. Then, it heads west for 3 miles (4.8 km) where it again overlaps, this time with US-160.

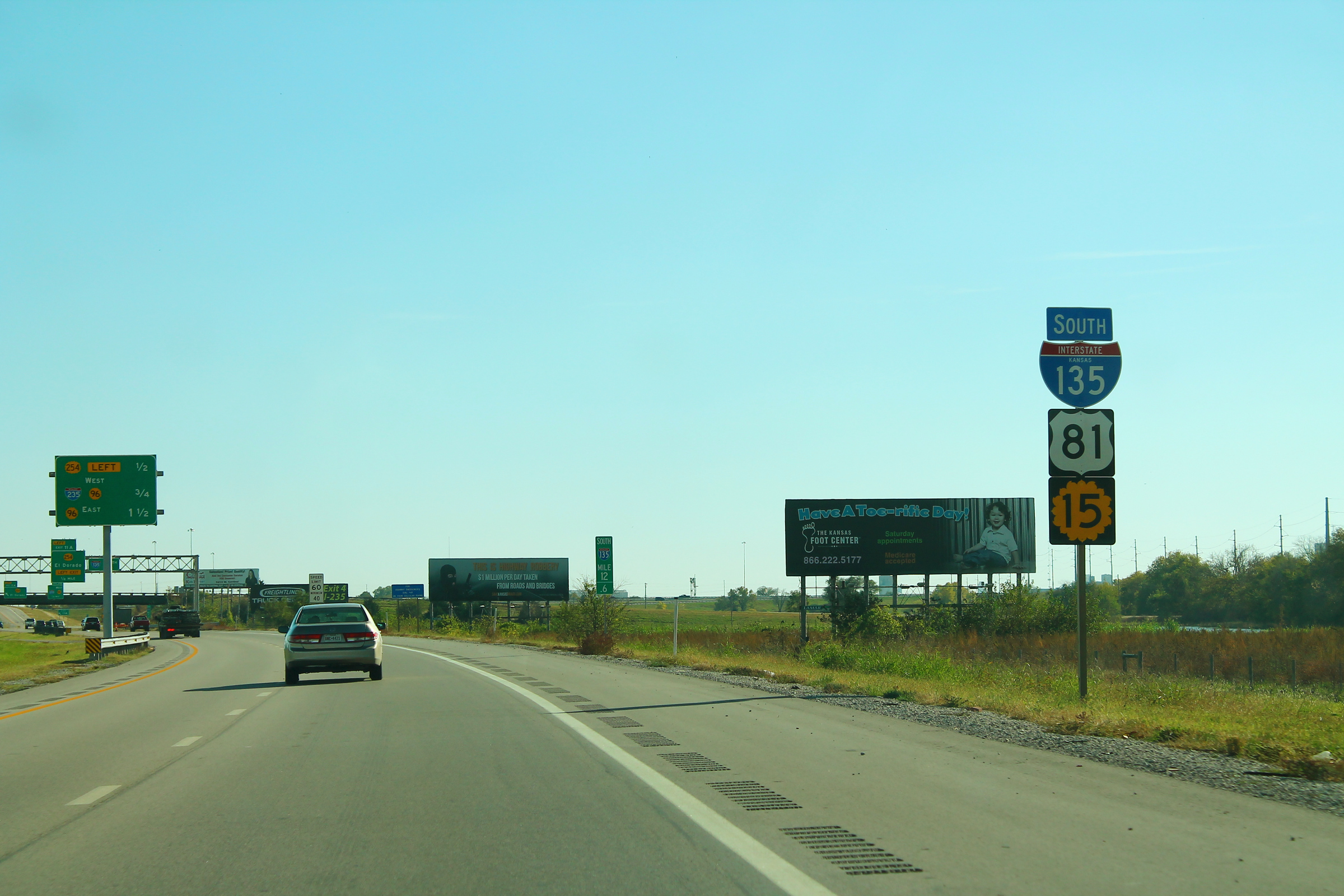
K-15 concurrent with I-135 and US-81

At Winfield, K-15 follows US-77 west to Udall and then turns north then cuts through Mulvane. It then continues traveling north through Derby, finally joining I-135 and US-81 in Wichita. K-15 is a multilane divided highway beginning immediately southeast of Mulvane at its intersection with K-53. K-15 follows this four-lane alignment through both Mulvane and Derby until merging with I-135 in south Wichita.

K-15 follows the I-135 alignment to US-50, where it exits after less than a mile onto Kansas Avenue (old US-81) in Newton. It goes through Newton and North Newton then continues north to US-56 in Marion County. It overlaps US-56 east for 6 miles (9.7 km) then continues north through Durham before crossing K-4. It keeps heading towards Abilene, where it crosses I-70, and continues north to K-18.

K-15 overlaps K-18 another 4 miles (6.4 km) before returning north and crossing US-24 at Clay Center. K-9 joins K-15 for 12 miles (19 km), then departs. K-15 overlaps US-36 for 6 miles (9.7 km) before returning north to end at the Nebraska border, becoming N-15.

The entire section within Winfield is maintained by the city. The entire 1.630 miles (2.623 km) section of K-15 within Mulvane is maintained by the city. The entire 2.118 miles (3.409 km) section within Derby is maintained by the city. The section of K-15 in Wichita from the south city limit to I-135 is maintained by the city. The section of K-15 in Newton from US-50 to the north city limit is maintained by the city. The entire 2.758 miles (4.439 km) section within Abilene is maintained by the city. The entire 1.910 miles (3.074 km) section within Clay Center is maintained by the city.

== History ==
K-15 once split into two routes near Washington. The K-15W fork is the present-day routing of K-15, while K-15E was redesignated as part of K-148. Before 1988, the section of K-148 from the K-9/K-15 intersection to the Nebraska border was designated as K-15E and the section of K-15 from the K-9/K-148 intersection northward was designated as K-15W. Then in a May 2, 1988 resolution, K-148 was extended over the former K-15E and K-15W was renumbered to K-15. K-15 was the only state route in Kansas to fork in this manner.

== Junction list ==
County	Location	mi	km	Destinations	Notes
Cowley		0.000	0.000	SH-18 south	Continuation into Oklahoma
Cowley		7.870	12.666	US-166 east – Sedan	South end of US-166 concurrency
Cowley		11.820	19.022	US-166 west – Arkansas City, Winfield	North end of US-166 concurrency
Cowley		24.039	38.687	US-160 east – Burden	North end of US-160 concurrency
Cowley	Winfield	33.893	54.545	K-360 west	Eastern terminus of K-360
Cowley	Winfield	36.592	58.889	US-77 south (Main Street) / US-160 west (9th Avenue) – Wellington, Arkansas City	North end of US-160 concurrency; south end of US-77 concurrency
Cowley		47.050	75.720	US-77 north – El Dorado	North end of US-77 concurrency
Cowley	Udall	53.009	85.310	K-55 west (Clark Street) – Belle Plaine	Eastern terminus of K-55
Sumner	Mulvane	61.711	99.314	K-53 west (119th Street South)	Eastern terminus of K-53; interchange
Sedgwick		73.093	117.632	I-35 / Kansas Turnpike	Exit 45 on I-35/Kansas Tpke.
Sedgwick	Wichita	74.297	119.569	Southeast Boulevard north	Interchange; northbound exit and southbound entrance
Sedgwick	Wichita	74.297	119.569	I-135 / US-81 south	Interchange; south end of I-135/US-81 concurrency; southbound exit and northbound entrance; exit 3A on I-135
Overlap with I-135/US-81
Harvey	Newton	101.083	162.677	I-135 north / US-50 east (US-81 north) – Salina, Emporia	North end of I-135/US-81 concurrency; south end of US-50 concurrency; exit 30 on I-135
Harvey	Newton	101.841	163.897	US-50 west – Hutchinson	Interchange; north end of US-50 concurrency
Harvey	Newton	105.793	170.257	I-135 / US-81 – Salina, Wichita	Exit 34 on I-135
Marion	Goessel	117.064	188.396	K-215 west – Goessel	Eastern terminus of K-215
Marion		125.042	201.236	US-56 west – McPherson	South end of US-56 concurrency
Marion		126.526	203.624	K-168 north – Lehigh	Southern terminus of K-168
Marion	Hillsboro	131.040	210.888	US-56 east (200th Street) – Marion	North end of US-56 concurrency
Dickinson	Elmo	153.095	246.383	K-4 (600 Avenue) – Gypsum, Hope	
Dickinson	Abilene	171.143	275.428	I-70 / US-40 – Topeka, Salina	Exit 275 on I-70
Dickinson		177.539	285.721	K-18 west (3000 Avenue) – Bennington	South end of K-18 concurrency
Dickinson		181.505	292.104	K-18 east (3000 Avenue) – Junction City	North end of K-18 concurrency
Clay		188.561	303.460	K-197 west – Industry	Eastern terminus of K-197
Clay		194.524	313.056	K-82 east (7th Road) – Wakefield	Western terminus of K-82
Clay	Clay Center	205.578	330.846	US-24 (Crawford Street) – Beloit, Manhattan	
Clay		211.564	340.479	K-80 west – Morganville	Eastern terminus of K-80
Clay–Washington county line		218.491	351.627	K-9 west (Parallel Road) – Concordia	South end of K-9 concurrency
Washington		223.011	358.901	K-115 west (Palmer Avenue) – Palmer	Eastern terminus of K-115
Washington		230.585	371.091	K-9 east / K-148 (10th Road) – Blue Rapids, Agenda	North end of K-9 concurrency; K-148 east is former K-15E; K-15 north of this point is former K-15W
Washington	Washington	237.619	382.411	US-36 east (7th Street) – Marysville	South end of US-36 concurrency
Washington		243.966	392.625	US-36 west (17th Road) – Belleville	North end of US-36 concurrency
Washington		257.141	413.828	N-15 north	Continuation into Nebraska
1.000 mi = 1.609 km; 1.000 km = 0.621 mi: Concurrency terminus; Incomplete access; Tolled

== See also ==
- List of state highways in Kansas
