= K-30 (Kansas highway) =

State highway in Kansas, U.S.

K-30
- K-30 highlighted in red

Route information
- Maintained by KDOT
- Length: 1.950 mi (3.138 km)
- Existed: 1930s–present

Major junctions
- South end: I-70 / US-40 south of Maple Hill
- North end: Southern city limit of Maple Hill

Location
- Country: United States
- State: Kansas
- Counties: Wabaunsee

Highway system
- Kansas State Highway System; Interstate; US; State; Spurs
← K-29	→ K-31

K-30 is a 1.95-mile-long (3.14 km) state highway running from Interstate 70 (I-70) north to the southern city limit of Maple Hill. A previous designation existed in the late 1920s which was removed by 1932. It existed in Jefferson County. The current route was established in the early 1930s.

== Route description ==
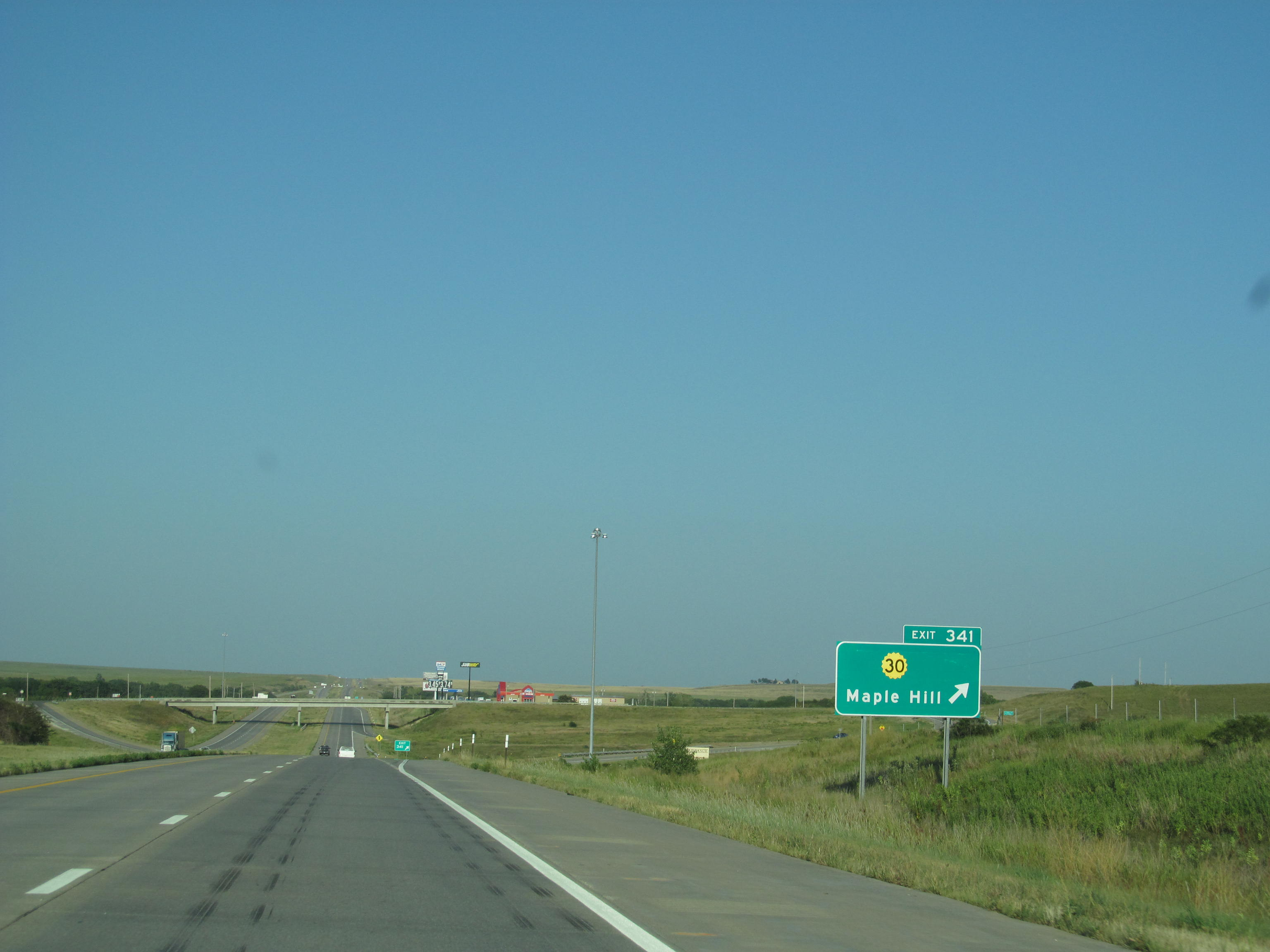
I-70 exit for K-30

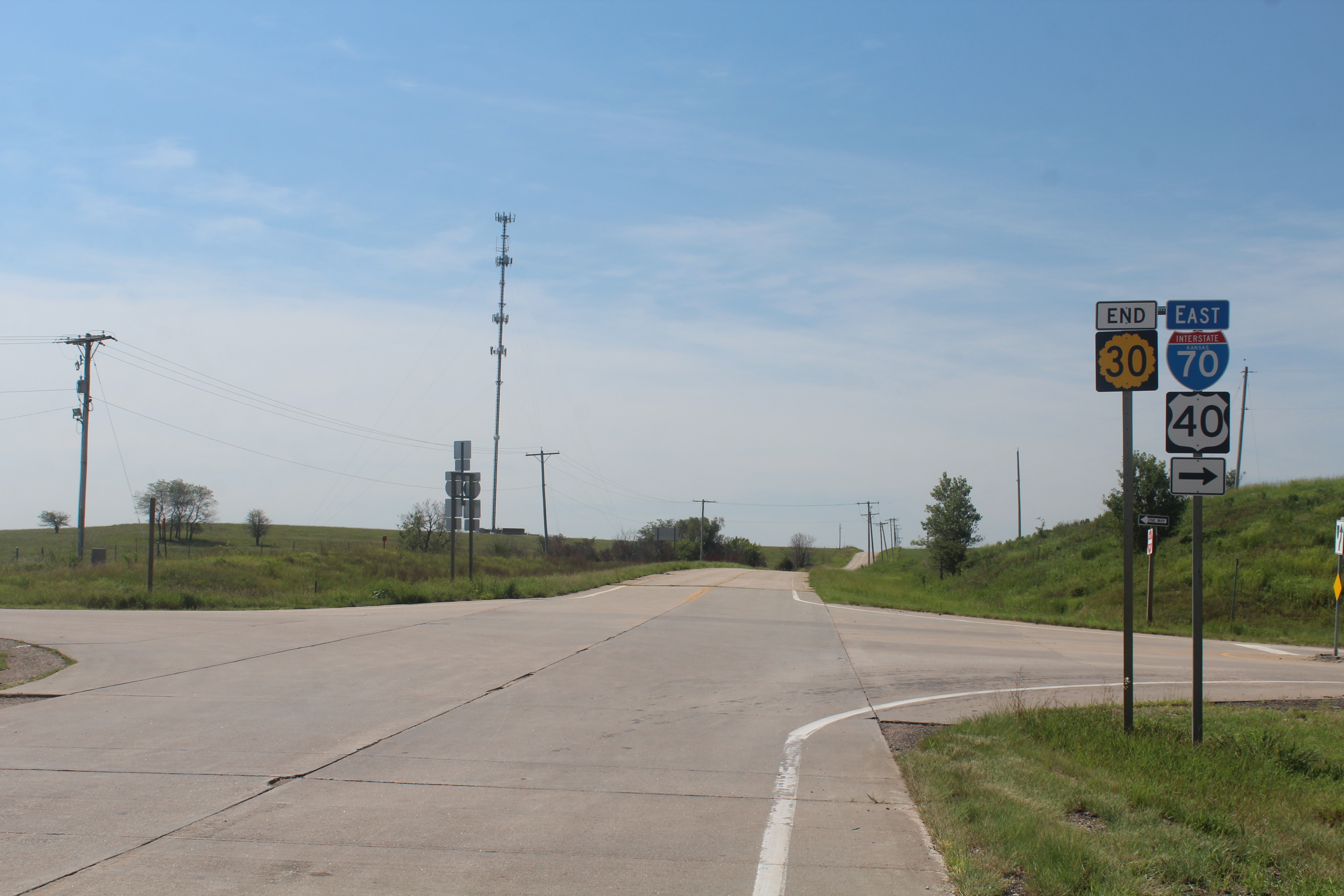
The southern terminus of K-30

The route begins at a partial cloverleaf interchange with I-70, which also carries US 40, at that freeway's exit 341. The road continues southward as Windy Hill Road toward Eskridge. From I-70, K-30 crosses the Mill Creek before intersecting Waterman Crossing Road. The road then crosses a railroad owned by Union Pacific before abruptly turning to the east. K-30 warps slightly northeast, running parallel to the railway line. Following an intersection with Sunset Lane, the highway picks up the name of Elm Street as it runs along the southern city limit of Maple Hill. The roadway ends near an intersection with Main Street.

The route is maintained by the Kansas Department of Transportation (KDOT). In 2010, KDOT calculated that the route's annual average daily traffic was 1420 vehicles, including 85 trucks. No segment of the highway is part of the National Highway System. The National Highway System is a system of highways important to the nation's defense, economy, and mobility.

== History ==
A previous designation for K-30 was brought into the Kansas state highway system by 1927. The route connected US 40 in Tonganoxie to US 73W in Oskaloosa. At that time, it was only a graded road. This designation was removed by 1932. The current designation of K-30 was established in the early 1930s, from K-10 (at that time) to Maple Hill, when it was only a gravel road. In 1953, the route was paved. In 1960, I-70 was completed through the region, replacing K-10. Since then, the route has not been realigned.

== Major intersections ==
The entire route is in Maple Hill Township, Wabaunsee County.

mi	km	Destinations	Notes
0.000	0.000	I-70 / US-40 – Topeka, Salina	Southern terminus; exit 341 on I-70; partial cloverleaf interchange; road continues as Windy Hill Road
1.950	3.138	Maple Hill city limit	Northern terminus; road continues east as Elm Street
1.000 mi = 1.609 km; 1.000 km = 0.621 mi
