= U.S. Route 40 in Kansas =

Section of U.S. Numbered Highway in Kansas, United States

U.S. Highway 40
- US 40 highlighted in red

Route information
- Maintained by KDOT
- Length: 423.67 mi (681.83 km)

Major junctions
- West end: US 40 at the Colorado state line near Weskan
- US-83 in Oakley; I-70 east of Oakley; US-283 in WaKeeney; US-183 in Hays; US-281 in Russell; I-135 / US-81 near Salina; US-77 in Junction City; I-470 / US-75 in Topeka; US-24 / US-59 in Lawrence; I-70 / Kansas Turnpike; in Lawrence
- North end: I-70 / US 24 / US 40 / US 169 at the Missouri state line in Kansas City

Location
- Country: United States
- State: Kansas
- Counties: Wallace, Logan, Gove, Trego, Ellis, Russell, Ellsworth, Lincoln, Saline, Dickinson, Geary, Riley, Wabaunsee, Shawnee, Douglas, Leavenworth, Wyandotte

Highway system
- United States Numbered Highway System; List; Special; Divided; Kansas State Highway System; Interstate; US; State; Spurs
← K-39	→ K-41

U.S. Route 40 (US-40) is a part of the U.S. Highway System that runs from Interstate 80 (I-80) and US-189 in Silver Summit, Utah east to US-322 and Ocean Drive in Atlantic City, New Jersey. In the U.S. state of Kansas, US-40 is a main east–west highway that runs from the Colorado border east to the Missouri border. The highway is concurrent with Interstate 70 (I-70) from Oakley to Topeka, and again through Kansas City.

== Route description ==
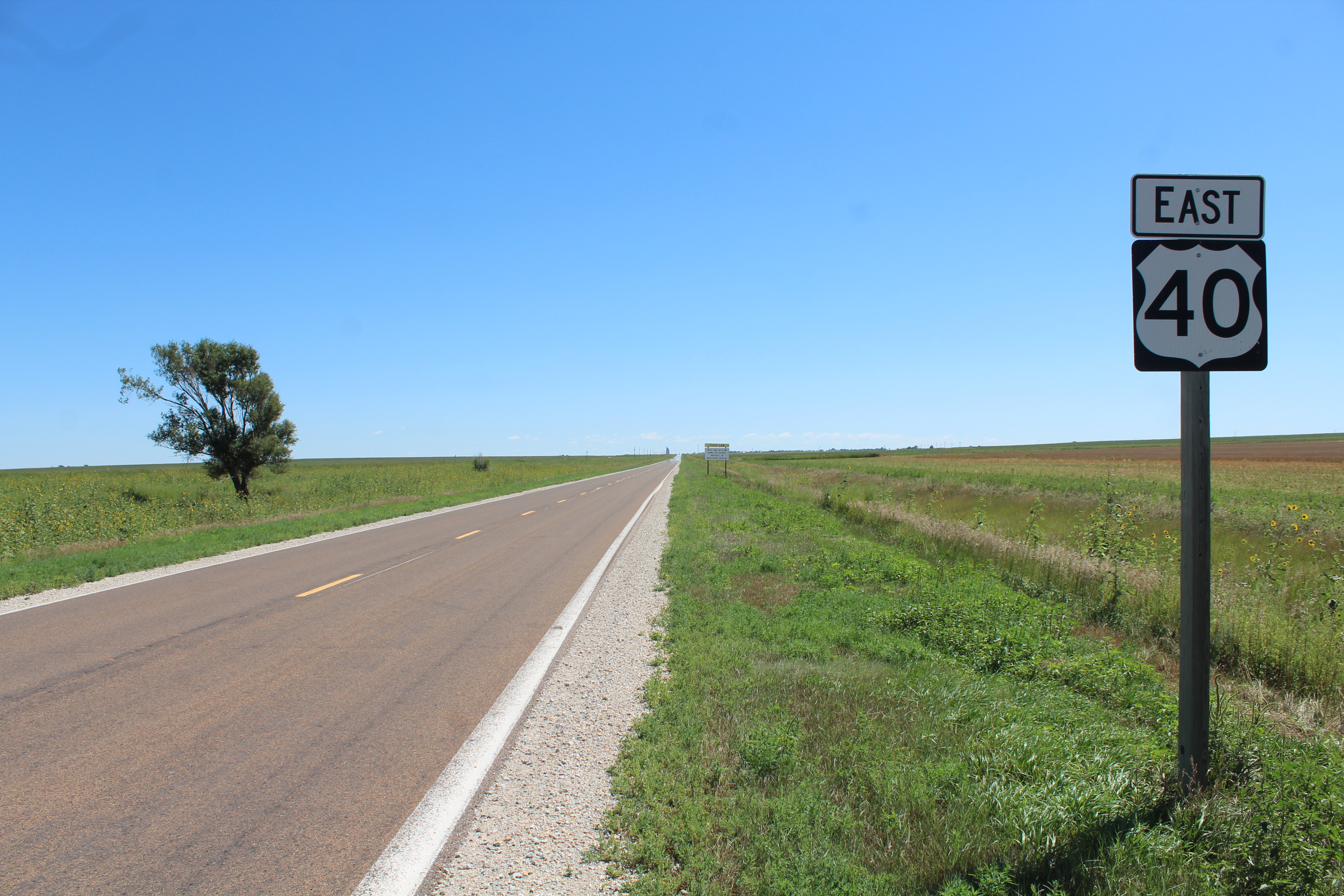
US 40 eastbound after crossing into Kansas from Colorado

US 40 enters Kansas near the unincorporated community of Weskan. The first sizable town it enters is Sharon Springs, where it intersects K-27. From there it goes northeast to Oakley and follows Eagle Eye Road before merging with I-70 east of town. The two routes remain merged until Topeka, although the prior alignment of US 40, named Old Highway 40, parallels I-70 for most of the way. From Ellsworth to Salina, the old alignment of US 40 is signed as K-140.

In Topeka, US 40 leaves I-70 at exit 366, follows the Oakland Expressway concurrent with K-4 north to 6th Avenue, then heads east along 6th Avenue out of town. Through Topeka, US 40 closely follows the route of the Oregon Trail. At the Shawnee-Douglas county line near Big Springs, US 40 crosses to the south of I-70 and enters Lawrence from the west along West 6th Street. At the west side of Lawrence, the route is joined by K-10 and travels south and east to the junction with US 59 and then runs north with US 59 to cross the Kansas River. It follows North 2nd and North 3rd Streets, crosses back under I-70, leaves US 59, and merges with US 24 before leaving town.

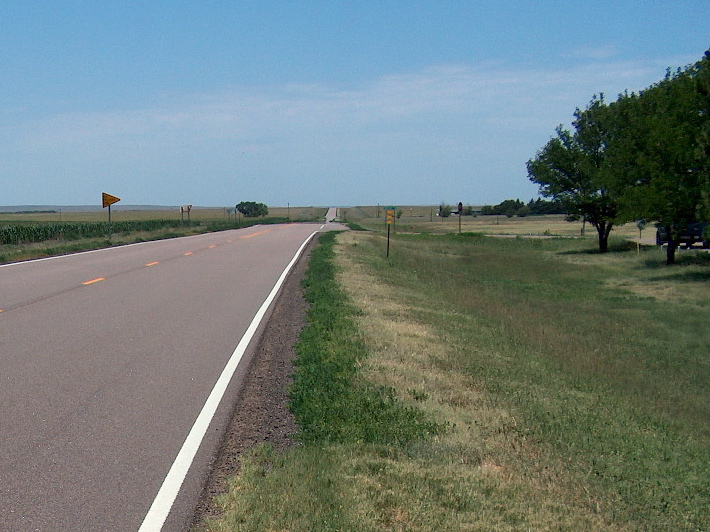
US 40 crossing the Great Plains in Kansas

US 40 remains merged with US 24 as the two routes travel northeast to the town of Tonganoxie. From there, the merged routes turn due east toward Kansas City, Kansas. In Kansas City, US 40 and US 24 intersect US 73 and K-7, and turning south toward Interstate 70. US 40, along with US 24, then merge onto I-70 and recross the Kansas River over the Lewis and Clark Viaduct just before entering Kansas City, Missouri.

On December 1, 2008, US 40, along with US 24 and US 73, was rerouted south along K-7 west of Kansas City to the intersection with I-70. Before this date, US 40 and US 24 continued along State Avenue to College Parkway before turning right to follow Turner Diagonal for 1/2 mile (800 m) where US 40 joined Interstate 70 for the duration of its journey eastward toward Missouri.

In 1951, the State of Kansas designated U.S. Route 40 as a Blue Star Memorial Highway from border to border.

== History ==
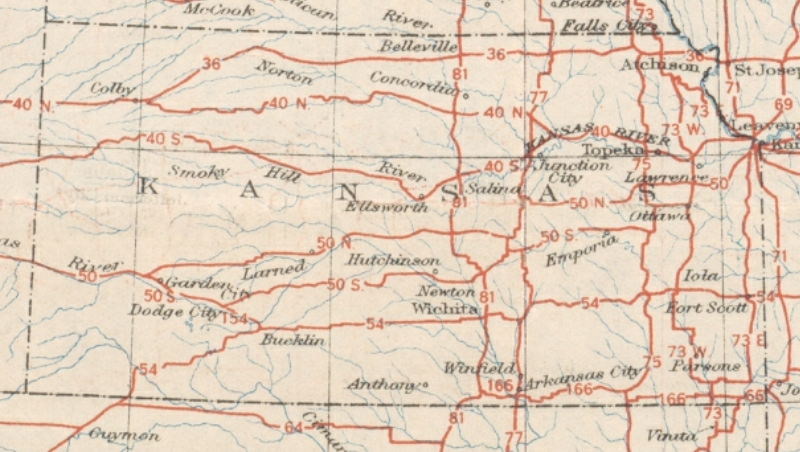
A map of Kansas's U.S. Highways as laid out in 1926

By October 1967, the section of I-70 from north of Dorrance to north of Salina was open to traffic. Then in an October 13, 1967 resolution, US-40 was realigned onto the newly opened section I-70.

== Major intersections ==
Exit numbers are those of I-70 and Kansas Turnpike

County	Location	mi	km	Exit	Destinations	Notes
Wallace		0.000	0.000		US 40 west – Limon	Continuation into Colorado
Wallace	Sharon Springs				K-27 south – Tribune	West end of K-27 concurrency
Wallace	Sharon Springs				K-27 north – Goodland	East end of K-27 concurrency
Logan					K-25 south	Western end of K-25 overlap
Logan					K-25 north	Eastern end of K-25 overlap
Logan	Oakley				US-83 north	Western end of US-83 overlap
Logan	Oakley				US-83 south	Eastern end of US-83 overlap
Gove		75.87	122.10		I-70 west – Denver	Western end of I-70 concurrency; I-70 exit 76
Gove		79.80	128.43	79	Campus Road	
Gove		85.75	138.00	85	K-216 – Grinnell	
Gove		93.72	150.83	93	K-23 – Grainfield, Gove	
Gove		95.68	153.98	95	K-23 north – Hoxie	Access via unsigned K-23 Spur
Gove		99.67	160.40	99	K-211 – Park	
Gove	Quinter	107.31	172.70	107	Castle Rock Road – Quinter	Former K-212
Trego		114.93	184.96	115	K-198 north – Collyer	
Trego		119.84	192.86	120	Voda Road	
Trego	WaKeeney	126.89	204.21	127	US 40 Bus. east / US-283 – WaKeeney, Ness City	
Trego	WaKeeney	127.93	205.88	128	US 40 Bus. west to US-283 north – WaKeeney, Hill City	
Trego		135.11	217.44	135	K-147 – Ogallah	
Trego		140.23	225.68	140	Riga Road	
Ellis	Ellis	145.29	233.82	145	K-247 – Ellis	
Ellis		152.68	245.71	153	Yocemento Avenue	
Ellis	Hays	156.80	252.35	157	US 183 Byp. – Hays, La Crosse	
Ellis	Hays	159.00	255.89	159	US-183 – Hays, Stockton	
Ellis		161.31	259.60	161	Commerce Parkway	
Ellis		163.35	262.89	163	Toulon Avenue	
Ellis		168.34	270.92	168	K-255 – Victoria	
Ellis		172.56	277.71	172	Walker Avenue	
Russell		175.56	282.54	175	176th Street – Gorham	Former K-257
Russell		180.56	290.58	180	Balta Road	
Russell	Russell	184.54	296.99	184	US-281 – Russell, Hoisington	Former western terminus of US 40 Bus.
Russell		188.56	303.46	189	Pioneer Road	Former eastern terminus of US 40 Bus.
Russell		192.56	309.90	193	Bunker Hill Road	
Russell	Dorrance	199.09	320.40	199	Dorrance	Former K-231
Ellsworth		205.48	330.69	206	K-232 – Wilson, Lucas	
Ellsworth		209.50	337.16	209	Sylvan Grove	
Ellsworth		215.52	346.85	216	Vesper	
Ellsworth		218.54	351.71	219	K-14 south – Ellsworth	West end of K-14 overlap
Ellsworth		221.44	356.37	221	K-14 north – Lincoln	East end of K-14 overlap
Ellsworth		224.87	361.89	225	K-156 – Ellsworth, Great Bend	
Lincoln		232.96	374.91	233	Beverly, Carneiro	
Saline		237.96	382.96	238	Brookville, Tescott	
Saline		243.97	392.63	244	Hedville, Culver	
Saline		248.99	400.71	249	Halstead Road	
Saline		250.24	402.72	250A-B	I-135 south / US-81 – Wichita, Concordia	Northern terminus of I-135, exits 95A-B; cloverleaf interchange.
Saline	Salina	252.02	405.59	252	K-143 (Ninth Street)	
Saline		253.09	407.31	253	Ohio Street	
Saline		259.49	417.61	260	Niles Road	
Dickinson	Solomon	265.94	427.99	266	Solomon Road	Former K-221
Dickinson		272.00	437.74	272	Fair Road	
Dickinson	Abilene	274.54	441.83	275	K-15 – Abilene, Clay Center	
Dickinson		277.09	445.93	277	Jeep Road	
Dickinson		280.30	451.10	281	K-43 – Enterprise	
Dickinson		285.54	459.53	286	K-206 – Chapman	
Geary		289.85	466.47	290	Milford Lake Road	
Geary	Junction City	294.34	473.69	295	US-77 / K-18 west – Marysville, Herington	West end of K-18 overlap
Geary	Junction City	295.92	476.24	296	US 40 Bus. east (Washington Street)	
Geary	Junction City	297.29	478.44	298	East Street / Chestnut Street	
Geary	Grandview Plaza	298.28	480.04	299	Flinthills Boulevard ( US 40 Bus. / K-57) / J Hill Road	
Geary	Grandview Plaza	299.18	481.48	300	US 40 Bus. west / K-57 – Council Grove	No westbound entrance
Geary		300.33	483.33	301	Fort Riley, Marshall Field	
Geary		302.28	486.47	303	K-18 east – Manhattan	East end of K-18 overlap
Geary		303.42	488.31	304	Humboldt Creek Road	
Geary		306.87	493.86	307	McDowell Creek Road	
Geary		311.22	500.86	311	Moritz Road	
Geary		313.26	504.14	313	K-177 – Council Grove, Manhattan	
Riley		315.44	507.65	316	Deep Creek Road	
Riley		317.61	511.14	318	Frontage Road	
Wabaunsee		321.76	517.82	322	Tallgrass Road	
Wabaunsee		323.25	520.22	324	Wabaunsee Road	
Wabaunsee		326.73	525.82	328	K-99 – Wamego, Alma	
Wabaunsee		329.26	529.89	330	K-185 – McFarland	
Wabaunsee		331.19	533.00	332	Spring Creek Road	
Wabaunsee		332.18	534.59	333	K-138 – Paxico	
Wabaunsee		334.28	537.97	335	Snokomo Road	
Wabaunsee		337.24	542.74	338	Vera Road	
Wabaunsee		340.22	547.53	341	K-30 – Maple Hill	
Wabaunsee		341.23	549.16	342	Keene-Eskridge Road	
Wabaunsee		342.21	550.73	343	Ranch Road	Private interchange put in for the Brethour Ranch
Shawnee		345.20	555.55	346	Carlson Road	
Shawnee		346.70	557.96	347	West Union Road	
Shawnee		349.22	562.02	350	Valencia Road	
Shawnee		350.24	563.66	351	Frontage Road	Eastbound exit and westbound entrance
Shawnee		352.26	566.91	353	K-4 west (Auburn Road)	West end of K-4 overlap
Shawnee	Topeka	354.65	570.75	355	I-470 east / US-75 south – Topeka	West end of US-75 overlap; western terminus of I-470, exit 1A to 70 east westbound.
Shawnee	Topeka	355.24	571.70	356	Wanamaker Road	
Shawnee	Topeka	356.38– 356.85	573.54– 574.29	357A	Fairlawn Road	Signed as exit 357 eastbound
Shawnee	Topeka	356.38– 356.85	573.54– 574.29	357B	Danbury Lane	Westbound exit only
Shawnee	Topeka	357.16– 357.54	574.79– 575.40	358A	US-75 north	East end of US-75 overlap; signed as exit 358 eastbound
Shawnee	Topeka	357.16– 357.54	574.79– 575.40	358B	Gage Boulevard	Signed as exit 358 eastbound
Shawnee	Topeka	358.56	577.05	359	MacVicar Avenue	
Shawnee	Topeka	360.23– 360.94	579.73– 580.88	361A	1st Avenue	Provides access to Topeka Boulevard; eastbound exit and westbound entrance
Shawnee	Topeka	360.23– 360.94	579.73– 580.88	361B	3rd Street / Monroe Street	Eastbound exit and westbound entrance
Shawnee	Topeka	361.04– 361.66	581.04– 582.04	362A	4th Street	Westbound exit and eastbound entrance
Shawnee	Topeka	361.04– 361.66	581.04– 582.04	362B	8th Avenue	Signed as exit 362 eastbound
Shawnee	Topeka	361.04– 361.66	581.04– 582.04	362C	10th Avenue / Madison Street	Westbound exit and eastbound entrance
Shawnee	Topeka	362.11	582.76	363	Adams Street / Branner Trafficway	
Shawnee	Topeka	363.08– 363.82	584.32– 585.51	364A	California Avenue	
Shawnee	Topeka	363.08– 363.82	584.32– 585.51	364B	Carnahan Avenue / Deer Creek Trafficway	
Shawnee	Topeka	364.58	586.73	365	Rice Road	
Shawnee	Topeka	365.39	588.04	—	I-70 Toll east / Kansas Turnpike east – Kansas City Kansas Turnpike south / I-470 Toll west – Wichita	East end of I-70 overlap; I-70 exit 366
Shawnee	Tecumseh				K-4 east – Valley Falls	East end of K-4 overlap; east end of freeway section
Douglas	Lawrence				K-10 west	Western end of K-10 overlap
Douglas	Lawrence				K-10 east / US-59 south	Eastern end of K-10 overlap; western end of US-59 overlap
Douglas	Lawrence				I-70 / Kansas Turnpike	I-70 exit 204
Douglas	Lawrence				US-24 west / US-59 north	Western end of US-24 overlap; eastern end of US-59 overlap
Douglas					K-32 east	Western terminus of K-32
Leavenworth	Tonganoxie				K-16 west	Eastern terminus of K-16
Wyandotte					US-73 north / K-7 north	Western end of US-73/K-7 overlap
Wyandotte	Kansas City				I-70 west / K-7 south / US-73 ends	West end of I-70 overlap; east end of US-73/K-7 overlap; southern terminus of US-73; Kansas Turnpike exit 224
Wyandotte	Kansas City			410	110th Street – Kansas Speedway	Exit numbers follow mileage of I-70
Wyandotte	Kansas City			411A-B	I-435	I-435 exits 12A-B; signed as exits 411A (south) and 411B (north)
Wyandotte	Kansas City			414	78th Street	
Wyandotte	Kansas City			415	Turner Diagonal / College Parkway	Signed as exits 415A (Turner Diagonal) and 415B (College Parkway) eastbound
Wyandotte	Kansas City			417	57th Street	
Wyandotte	Kansas City			418A-B	I-635 – St Joseph, Wichita	Signed as exits 418A (north) and 418B (south) eastbound; westbound access is part of exit 419; I-635 exits 4A-B
Wyandotte	Kansas City			419	Park Drive / 38th Street	
Wyandotte	Kansas City			420A	US-69 south (18th Street Expressway)	West end of US-69 overlap; east end of Kansas Turnpike
Wyandotte	Kansas City			420B	18th Street north	
Wyandotte	Kansas City			421A	Railroad Yard – No outlet, railroad use only	Westbound exit and eastbound entrance
Wyandotte	Kansas City			421B	I-670 east to I-35 south – St. Louis	Eastbound exit and westbound entrance
Wyandotte	Kansas City			422A	US-69 north (7th Street Trafficway)	East end of US-69 overlap
Wyandotte	Kansas City			422B	US-169 south (7th Street Trafficway)	West end of US-169 overlap
Wyandotte	Kansas City			422C	Pacific Avenue	
Wyandotte	Kansas City			422D	Central Avenue	
Wyandotte	Kansas City			423A	5th Street	Eastbound exit and westbound entrance
Wyandotte	Kansas City			423B	James Street / 3rd Street	Eastbound exit and westbound entrance
Wyandotte	Kansas City			423C	Minnesota Avenue / Washington Boulevard	Westbound exit and eastbound entrance
Wyandotte	Kansas City			423D	Fairfax District	Westbound exit and eastbound entrance
Kansas–Missouri line				I-70 east / US 24 east / US 40 east / US 169 north continue into Missouri		
1.000 mi = 1.609 km; 1.000 km = 0.621 mi: Concurrency terminus; Incomplete access; Tolled

== Related routes ==
=== WaKeeney business loop ===
U.S. Highway 40 Business
- Location: WaKeeney, Kansas
- Length: 2.3 mi (3.7 km)
- Existed: October 13, 1979–present

U.S. Route 40 Business (US-40 Bus.) is a 2.3-mile-long (3.7 km) business route through WaKeeney, Kansas, that was recommended in 1979 as substitute for the formerly proposed Interstate 70 Business Loop. It begins at exit 127 on Interstate 70/U.S. Route 40 (I-70/US-40) and travels to the north, concurrent with US-283 along South First Street. At the intersection with Barclay Avenue (Old Highway 40), US-40 Bus. and US-283 turn to the east. By the time Barclay Avenue encounters South 13th Street, US-283 turns left to the north, US-40 Bus. turns right to the south, and Old Highway 40 continues straight ahead to the east. After passing by the Kansas Veterans Cemetery, and the headquarters for the Western Co-Op Electric Association, US-40 Bus. terminates at exit 128 on I-70/US-40, while South 13th Street continues as a local road that changes its name to 260th Avenue.

=== Russell business loop ===
U.S. Highway 40 Business
- Location: Russell, Kansas
- Existed: October 13, 1979–November 15, 2013

U.S. Route 40 Business (US-40 Bus.) was a short business loop through Russell, Kansas. It ran from Exit 184 along Interstate 70/US 40, overlapping part of U.S. Route 281 (South Fossil Street) then makes a right turn onto East Wichita Avenue (old US 40). Just before the intersection with 187th Street, the road curves from east to southeast as it follows the south side of a railroad line, and passes the northeast side of the Russell Municipal Airport. East Wichita Avenue ends at 189th Street and BUS US 40 makes a right turn south as it ends at Exit 189 on I-70/US 40.

Business US 40 was approved in a meeting on October 13, 1979, after Alternate US 40 was decommissioned in Russell. US-40 Bus. was approved by AASHTO to be decommissioned on October 17, 2013. US-40 Bus. was decommissioned by KDOT on November 15, 2013.

=== Junction City business loop ===
U.S. Highway 40 Business
- Location: Junction City
- Existed: October 13, 1979–present

U.S. Route 40 Business (US-40 Bus.) is a business loop through Junction City. US-40 Business was approved in a meeting on October 13, 1979.

== See also ==
- List of U.S. Highways in Kansas

U.S. Route 40
Previous state: Colorado	Kansas	Next state: Missouri
