= Smoky Hill Township =

Smoky Hill Township may refer to:

- Smoky Hill Township, Geary County, Kansas
- Smoky Hill Township, Saline County, Kansas
- Smoky Hill Township, McPherson County, Kansas
