= Special routes of U.S. Route 40 =

Special routes of U.S. Route 40

Highway system
- United States Numbered Highway System; List; Special; Divided

Several special routes of U.S. Route 40 exist. In order from west to east they are as follows.

== Current routes ==
=== WaKeeney business loop ===
U.S. Highway 40 Business
- Location: WaKeeney, Kansas

U.S. Route 40 Business (US-40 Bus.) is a 2.3-mile-long (3.7 km) business route through WaKeeney, Kansas, that was recommended in 1979 as substitute for the formerly proposed Interstate 70 Business Loop. It begins at exit 127 on Interstate 70/U.S. Route 40 (I-70/US-40) and travels to the north, concurrent with US-283 along South First Street. At the intersection with Barclay Avenue (Old Highway 40), US-40 Bus. and US-283 turn to the east. By the time Barclay Avenue encounters South 13th Street, US-283 turns left to the north, US-40 Bus. turns right to the south, and Old Highway 40 continues straight ahead to the east. After passing by the Kansas Veterans Cemetery, and the headquarters for the Western Co-Op Electric Association, US-40 Bus. terminates at exit 128 on I-70/US-40, while South 13th Street continues as a local road that changes its name to 260th Avenue.

=== Junction City–Grandview Plaza business loop ===
U.S. Highway 40 Business
- Location: Junction City–Grandview Plaza, Kansas

U.S. Highway 40 Business (US-40 Bus.) is a 4.0-mile-long (6.4 km) business route of US-40, located in Junction City. The business route begins at a diamond interchange with I-70/US-40/K-18. The route travels north along Washington Street toward downtown Junction City. The route intersects with K-57 (6th Street) and turns east along that route. Both routes cross over the Smoky Hill River and enter Grandview Plaza. In this municipality, they encounter I-70/US-40/K-18. While K-57 turns southeast toward Council Grove at this interchange, the business route ends there.

=== Brownsville business loop ===
U.S. Route 40 Business
- Location: Brownsville, Pennsylvania

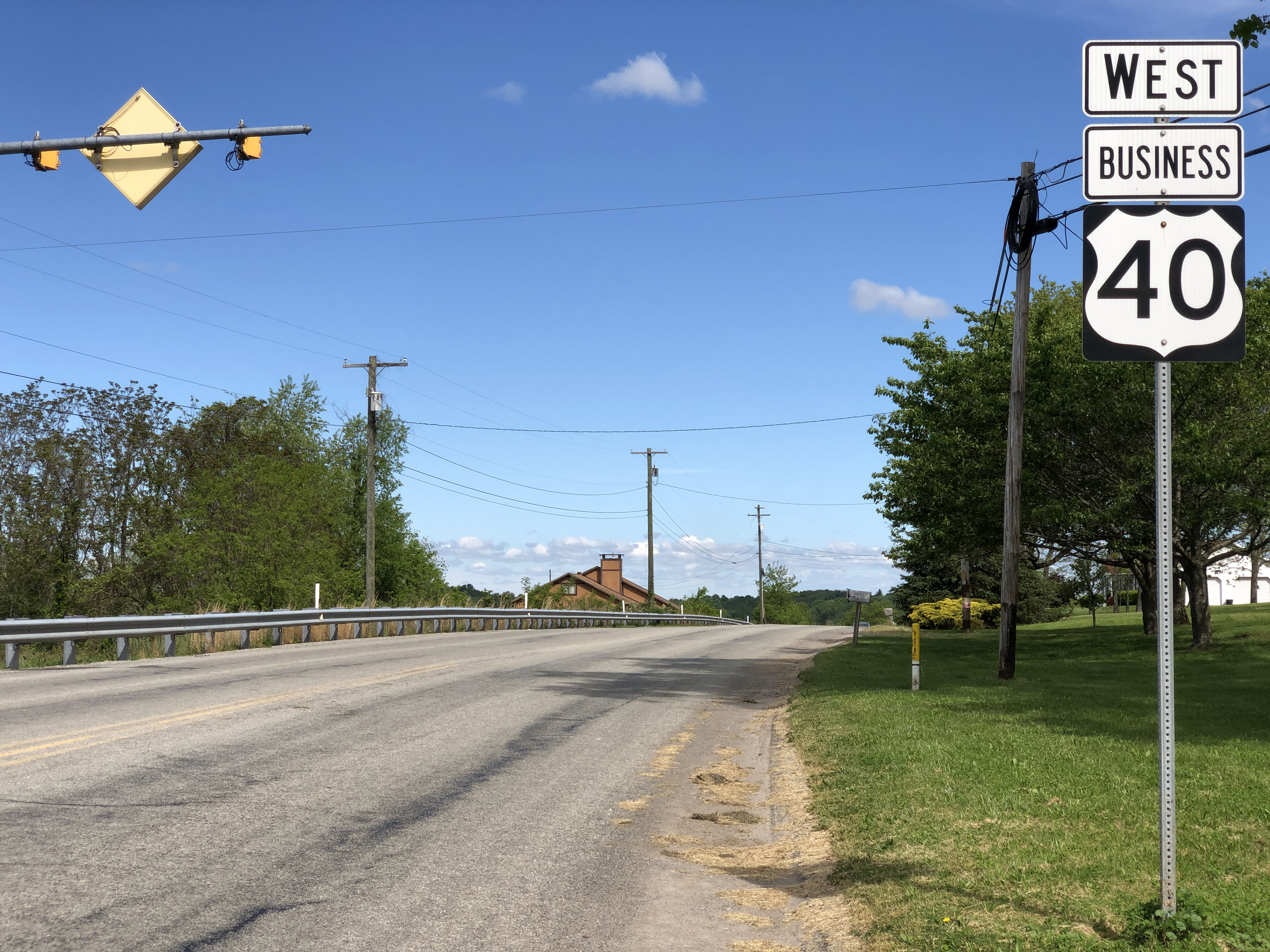
The westbound beginning of US 40 Bus. near Brownsville

Business U.S. Route 40 is a 2-mile-long (3.2 km) loop through Redstone Township, Fayette County, Pennsylvania. While called the Brownsville business loop, it never officially enters the borough, but instead serves some of its associated commercial development. In 2009, a stretch of US 40 was relocated to provide better access to the new Pennsylvania Route 43 freeway. As a result of the protests of local businesses, the short, bypassed stretch was signed.

=== Uniontown business loop ===
U.S. Route 40 Business
- Location: Uniontown, Pennsylvania
- Existed: 1993–present

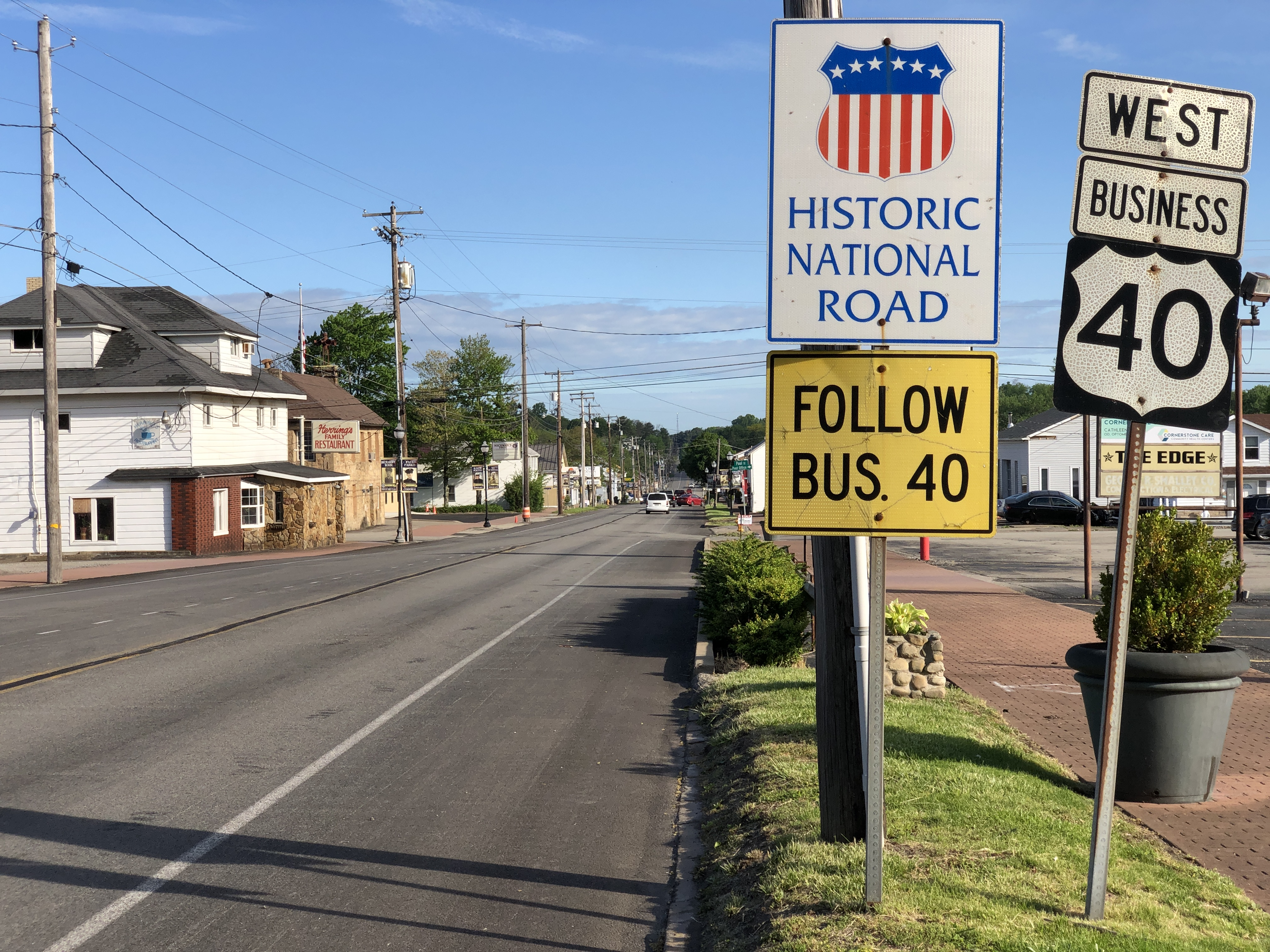
US 40 Bus. at its eastern end near Uniontown

Business U.S. Route 40 is a 5-mile-long (8.0 km) business route of U.S. Route 40 through downtown Uniontown, Pennsylvania, terminating at US 40 at both ends.

Prior to 1993, this route was US 40's alignment through Uniontown. A freeway bypass was constructed around the southern edge of Uniontown and US 40 shifted onto the freeway upon completion. The portion of the highway through the city center features a pair of one-way couplets along Main and Fayette Street. Trucks travelling westbound along Main Street are actually rerouted onto a street that is not state maintained, to avoid the narrow path in front of the Fayette County Courthouse.

=== Keysers Ridge–Cumberland alternate ===
U.S. Route 40 Alternate
- Location: Keysers Ridge–Cumberland, Maryland
- Length: 31.80 mi (51.18 km)
- Existed: Early 1980s–present
- Tourist routes: Historic National Road; Mountain Maryland Scenic Byway

U.S. Route 40 Alternate (Alt US 40) is the United States highway designation for a former segment of U.S. Route 40 (US 40) through Garrett and Allegany Counties in Maryland. The highway begins at US 40 near exit 14 on Interstate 68 and runs 31.80 miles (51.18 km) eastward to Cumberland, where it ends at exit 44 on Interstate 68. Alt US 40 is maintained by the Maryland State Highway Administration (MDSHA).

The highway is known as Old National Pike to reflect the fact that it follows the original alignment of the National Road. As the route of the historic National Road, there are many historic sites along Alt US 40, including the Casselman Bridge in Grantsville and the last remaining National Road toll gate house in Maryland, located in LaVale.

When the National Freeway was built in western Maryland paralleling the old National Road, parts of U.S. Route 40 were bypassed. The part of the bypassed road between Keyser's Ridge and Cumberland became Alt US 40, and other bypassed sections east of Cumberland became Maryland Route 144 and U.S. Route 40 Scenic. Although Alt US 40 has diminished in importance from its original status as the National Road due to the construction of Interstate 68, it remains an important route for local traffic and serves as the Main Streets of Grantsville and Frostburg.

=== Maryland scenic route ===
U.S. Route 40 Scenic
- Location: Allegany–Washington County, Maryland
- Length: 9.50 mi (15.29 km)
- Tourist routes: Historic National Road

U.S. Route 40 Scenic is a scenic route of U.S. Route 40 in the U.S. state of Maryland. US 40 Scenic is the old alignment of US 40 over Town Hill in eastern Allegany County and Sideling Hill in far western Washington County. The highway was originally constructed as part of the National Road in the early 19th century and paved as a modern road in the mid-1910s. US 40 was relocated over Sideling Hill in the early 1950s and over Town Hill in the mid-1960s. The US 40 Scenic designation was first applied to the old highway over Town Hill in 1965. Following the completion of Interstate 68 (I-68) at Sideling Hill, US 40 Scenic was extended east along old US 40's crossing of the mountain in the late 1980s. US 40 Scenic is the only U.S.-numbered scenic route, with US 412 Scenic becoming US 412 Alternate in 2012.

=== Hagerstown–Frederick alternate ===
U.S. Route 40 Alternate
- Location: Hagerstown–Frederick, Maryland
- Length: 22.97 mi (36.97 km)
- Tourist routes: Historic National Road; Antietam Campaign Scenic Byway

U.S. Route 40 Alternate is an alternate route of US 40 in the U.S. state of Maryland. The highway runs 22.97 miles (36.97 km) from Potomac Street in Hagerstown east to US 40 in Frederick. US 40 Alternate parallels US 40 to the south through eastern Washington County and western Frederick County. The alternate route connects Hagerstown and Frederick with Funkstown, Boonsboro, Middletown, and Braddock Heights.

US 40 Alternate is the old alignment of US 40. The highway's path was blazed in the mid-18th century to connect the Hagerstown Valley and Shenandoah Valley with eastern Pennsylvania and central Maryland. In the early 19th century, US 40 Alternate's path was improved as part of a series of turnpikes to connect Baltimore with the eastern terminus of the National Road in Cumberland. The highway was improved as one of the original state roads in the early 1910s and designated US 40 in the late 1920s. Construction on a relocated US 40 between Hagerstown and Frederick with improved crossings of Catoctin Mountain and South Mountain began in the mid-1930s; the new highway was completed in the late 1940s. US 40 Alternate was assigned to the old route of US 40 in the early 1950s.

=== Baltimore truck route ===
U.S. Route 40 Truck
- Location: Baltimore, Maryland

U.S. Route 40 Truck is a truck route of US 40 to route truck traffic away from Baltimore's downtown area, which mainline US 40 passes through. US 40's mainline also includes several low bridges, including the bridge which Amtrak's Northeast Corridor railroad line uses to cross the route. US 40 Truck diverges from US 40 at the intersection of US 40 (Edmondson Avenue) and Hilton Parkway, travelling north on the latter route to the western end of North Avenue. It runs east along the entire length of North Avenue, running concurrent with mainline US 1 from Fulton Avenue east. It turns north, along with US 1, onto Belair Road, and runs north until it meets Maryland Route 151 (Erdman Avenue). Here, it turns east again, following Erdman Avenue until it meets an interchange with mainline US 40 once again.

== Former routes ==
=== California–Nevada alternate route ===
U.S. Route 40 Alternate
- Location: Davis, California–Reno, Nevada
- Existed: 1954–1964

U.S. Route 40 Alternate (US 40 Alt.) was an alternate route of US 40. In 1954, US 40 Alt. was established, replacing a portion of California State Route 24 (SR 24) north of Davis. It roughly followed parts of present-day SR 113, SR 99, SR 20, SR 70, and US 395 before ending in Reno. In 1964, US 40 Alt. was decommissioned in accordance with the state highway renumbering in California.

=== Russell business loop ===
U.S. Highway 40 Business
- Location: Russell, Kansas
- Existed: mid-1980s–2013

Business U.S. Route 40 was a short business loop through Russell, Kansas. It ran from Exit 184 along Interstate 70/US 40, overlapping part of U.S. Route 281 (South Fossil Street) then makes a right turn onto East Wichita Avenue (old US 40). Just before the intersection with 187th Street, the road curves from east to southeast as it follows the south side of a railroad line, and passes the northeast side of the Russell Municipal Airport. East Wichita Avenue ends at 189th Street and BUS US 40 makes a right turn south as it ends at Exit 189 on I-70/US 40.

Business US 40 was formed in the mid-1980s after Alternate US 40 was decommissioned in Russell. US 40 Bus. was then decommissioned in 2013 in favor of transferring to local control.

=== Junction City–Grandview Plaza alternate route ===
U.S. Highway 40 Alternate
- Location: Junction City–Grandview Plaza, Kansas
- Existed: yes

U.S. Route 40 Alternate was an alternate route of US 40.

=== Kansas City optional route ===
U.S. Route 40 Optional
- Location: Kansas City, Missouri
- Existed: 1964

U.S. Route 40 Optional was an optional route of US 40. Before 1938, US 40 Optional used to end east of the city limit. It was then truncated as of 1938 to make way for US 40 Alternate. It ran along present-day Beardsley Road, Pennway Street, Summit Street, 27th Street, Broadway Boulevard, Wyandotte Street, and Linwood Boulevard before ending at The Paseo (former US 40/US 71). By 1964, US 40 Optional was decommissioned.

=== Kansas City city route ===
U.S. Route 40 City
- Location: Kansas City, Missouri
- Existed: 1935–1938

U.S. Route 40 City was a city route of US 40. US 40 City was established in 1935 after US 40 was rerouted west to connect to downtown Kansas City. US 40 City ran along what used to be the former alignment of US 40. It originally ran from Oak Street to 31st Street via Admiral Boulevard and The Paseo. By 1938, US 40 City was decommissioned in favor of rerouting US 40 back to its original alignment.

=== Kansas City alternate route ===
U.S. Route 40 Alternate
- Location: Kansas City–Independence, Missouri
- Existed: 1938–1966

U.S. Route 40 Alternate was an alternate route of US 40.

=== Columbia business loop ===
U.S. Route 40 Business
- Location: Columbia, Missouri
- Existed: 1960–1964

U.S. Route 40 Business was a business route of US 40. Before 1960, US 40 used to travel through present-day Interstate 70 Business. By 1960, US 40 was rerouted north onto present-day Interstate 70. As a result, US 40 Business was signed onto the former alignment of US 40. The business route was decommissioned in 1964 and then got replaced with Interstate 70 Business.

=== St. Louis bypass ===
U.S. Route 40 Bypass
- Location: Wentzville, Missouri–Troy, Illinois
- Existed: 1938–1965

U.S. Route 40 Bypass was a bypass of US 40. The bypass route was established in 1938 as a northern bypass of St. Louis. Initially, US 40 Bypass ended in Bridgeton. In 1941, US 40 Bypass was extended to Wentzville after US 40 was rerouted to avoid St. Charles. In 1965, US 40 Bypass was decommissioned in favor of Interstate 270 and Interstate 70.

=== St. Louis truck route ===
U.S. Route 40 Truck
- Location: Frontenac, Missouri–East St. Louis, Illinois
- Existed: 1942–1964

U.S. Route 40 Truck was a truck route of US 40.

=== St. Louis alternate route ===
U.S. Route 40 Alternate
- Location: Bridgeton–St. Louis, Missouri
- Existed: 1941–1964

U.S. Route 40 Alternate was an alternate route of US 40.

=== East St. Louis–Collinsville business loop ===
U.S. Route 40 Business
- Location: East St. Louis–Collinsville, Illinois
- Existed: late 1930s–1977

U.S. Route 40 Business (previously U.S. Route 40 City) was a business route of US 40.

=== East St. Louis–Collinsville alternate route ===
U.S. Route 40 Alternate
- Location: East St. Louis–Collinsville, Illinois
- Existed: 1960–1964

U.S. Route 40 Alternate was an alternate route of US 40. In 1960, a portion of US 40, as well as US 66, was moved onto the new freeway (signed as part of I-55/I-70). As a result, the former routing was signed as US 40 Alt. In 1963, US 40 and US 66 were realigned onto a newer portion of the freeway from IL 157 to Exchange Avenue. Then, as a result, the alternate route extended southwest to Exchange Avenue. In 1964, a freeway connection between Exchange Avenue and Veterans Memorial Bridge was made. As a result, US 40 Bus. was extended due southwest to East St. Louis, supplanting part of the alternate route.

=== Greenville–Vandalia alternate route ===
U.S. Route 40 Alternate
- Location: Greenville–Vandalia, Illinois
- Existed: 1948–1967

U.S. Route 40 Alternate was an alternate route of US 40. Up until the mid-1940s, a piece of US 40 used to run what was later Illinois Route 11 (then US 40 Alternate; now IL 140). After a completed bypass rerouted US 40 away from Greenville, IL 11 acquired most of the old route. Then, in 1947, IL 11 briefly extended to Vandalia after US 40 moved onto another bypass to avoid Hagarstown. In 1948, the formation of US 40 Alternate subsequently replaced IL 11 in the process. However, in 1967, IL 140 acquired most of the alternate route. The extension subsequently decommissioned US 40 Alt.

=== Washington alternate route ===
U.S. Route 40 Alternate
- Location: Washington, Pennsylvania
- Existed: yes

U.S. Route 40 Alternate was an alternate route of US 40. From west to east, it followed south via Jefferson Avenue, east via Beau Street, south via Franklin Street, and east via Maiden Street before ending at Main Street (originally US 40). By the 1950s, U.S. Route 40 Thru replaced the entirety of US 40 Alt. Then, by the 1960s, US 40 Thru was replaced by US 40 so that US 40 avoids downtown Washington.

=== Uniontown alternate route ===
U.S. Route 40 Alternate
- Location: Uniontown, Pennsylvania
- Existed: yes

U.S. Route 40 Alternate was an alternate route of US 40.

== See also ==
- List of special routes of the United States Numbered Highway System
