= Milford State Park =

State park in Kansas, United States

- Milford Lake State Park
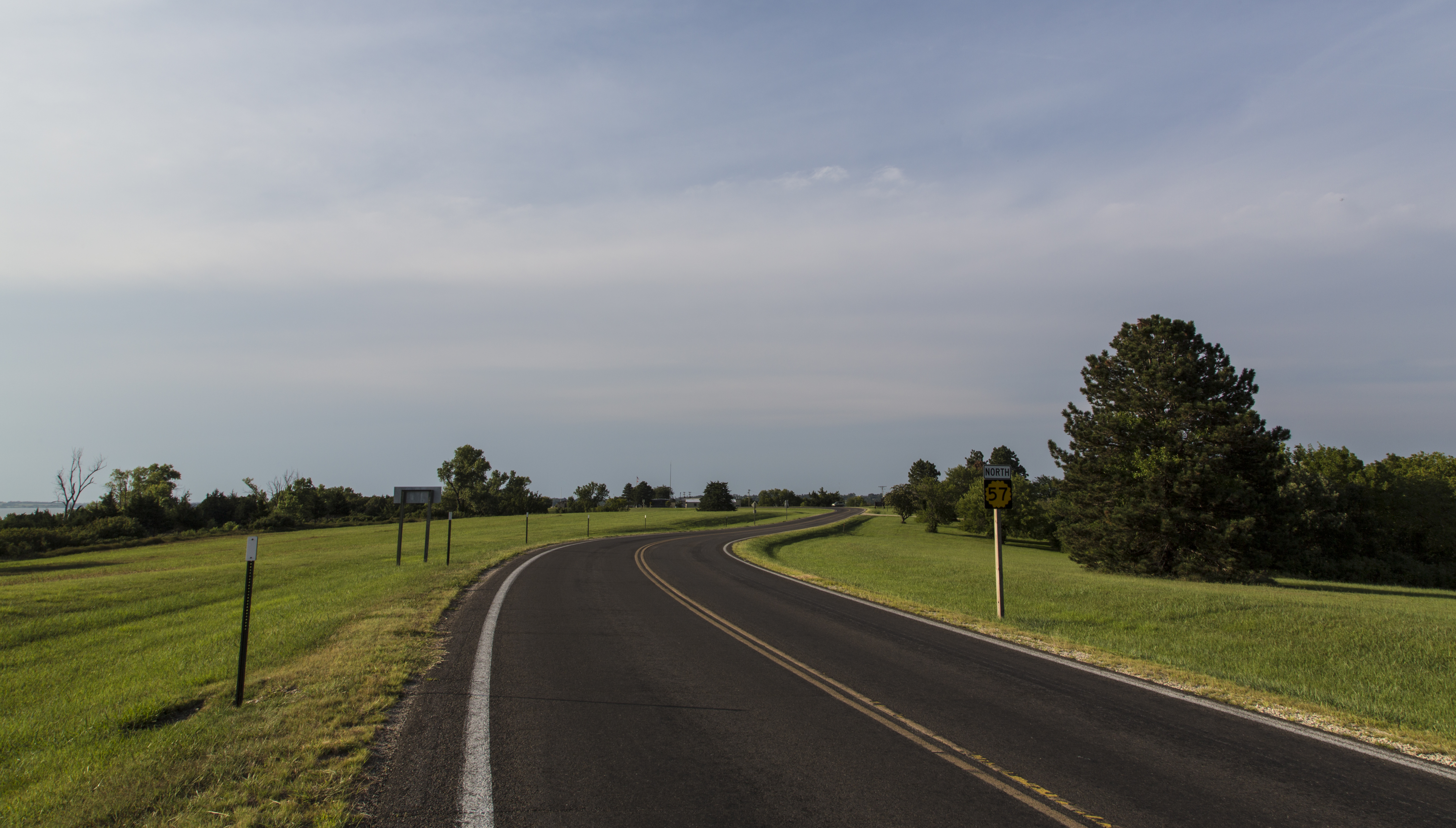
- View of Milford State Park from Kansas highway 57

- Location within Kansas Location within the United States
- Location: Geary County, Kansas
- Nearest city: Junction City, Kansas
- Coordinates: 39.104°N 96.900°W
- Area: 1,084 acres (4.39 km^{2})
- Visitors: 330,005 (in 2022)
- Governing body: Kansas Department of Wildlife, Parks and Tourism
- Website: Official website

Milford State Park is located northwest of Junction City, Kansas, United States, on the southeast shore of Milford Reservoir, the largest lake in Kansas. The lake is formed by Milford Dam. The park is used by anglers seeking walleye, crappie, large mouth bass, white bass, catfish, and small mouth bass as well as for wildlife photography and game hunters. Area game include quail, pheasant, prairie chicken, duck, goose, rabbit, turkey, deer, and squirrel while trappers pursue raccoon, muskrat, and beaver. There are 19,000 acres of public land around the park and the 1,100 acres (450 hectares) Steve Lloyd refuge, Milford Nature Center, and (below the dam) the Milford Fish Hatchery are nearby.
