= U.S. Route 77 in Kansas =

Segment of American highway

U.S. Highway 77
- US-77 highlighted in red

Route information
- Maintained by KDOT
- Existed: 1927–present

Major junctions
- South end: US 77 at the Oklahoma state line near Chilocco, OK
- US-166 in Arkansas City; US-160 / K-15 in Winfield; US-54 / US-400 in Augusta; I-35 / Kansas Turnpike in El Dorado; US-50 in Florence; US-56 from Marion to Herington; K-4 in Herington; I-70 / US-40 / K-18 in Junction City; US-24 in Riley; US-36 in Marysville
- North end: US 77 at the Nebraska state line near Oketo

Location
- Country: United States
- State: Kansas
- Counties: Cowley, Butler, Marion, Dickinson, Morris, Geary, Riley, Marshall

Highway system
- United States Numbered Highway System; List; Special; Divided; Kansas State Highway System; Interstate; US; State; Spurs
← K-76	→ K-78

U.S. Route 77 (US-77) is a part of the U.S. Highway System that runs from the Veteran's International Bridge in Brownsville, Texas north to Interstate 29 (I-29) in Sioux City, Iowa. In the U.S. state of Kansas, US-77 is a main north–south highway that runs from the Oklahoma border north to the Nebraska border.

== Route description ==
US 77 runs for 234 miles (377 km) in Kansas. Between the US 40 junction and the Cowley County line is designated as a Blue Star Memorial Highway. In Cowley County, it is the Robert B. Docking Memorial Highway. Near Arkansas City it is the Walnut Valley Greenway.

From Nebraska to US 24 and from K-15 to Arkansas City, it is part of the National Highway System.

== History ==
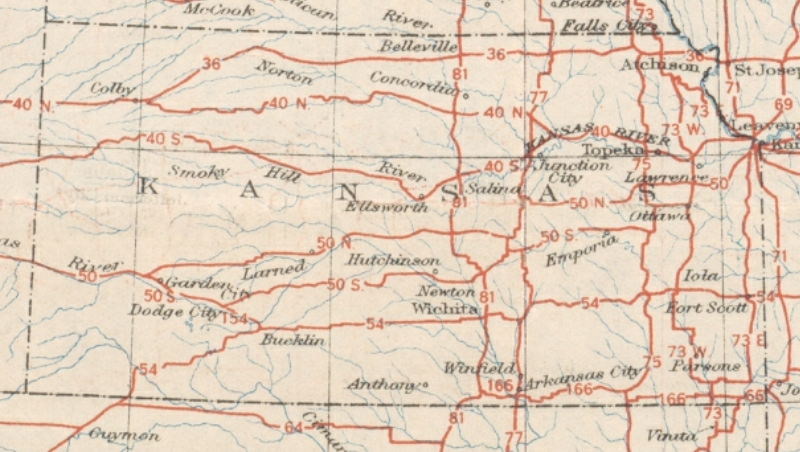
A map of Kansas's U.S. Highways as laid out in 1926

US-77 was established in Kansas by 1927.

The relocation of US-77 north of Winfield was approved on November 14, 1980.

== Major intersections ==
County	Location	mi	km	Destinations	Notes
Cowley		0.000	0.000	US 77 south	Continuation into Oklahoma
Cowley	Arkansas City			US-166 west	Southern end of US-166 overlap
Cowley				US-166 east	Northern end of US-166 overlap
Cowley				K-360 east	Western terminus of K-360
Cowley	Winfield			US-160 / K-15 south	Southern end of K-15 overlap
Cowley				K-15 north	Northern end of K-15 overlap
Butler	Augusta			US-54 west / US-400 west	Southern end of US-54 and US-400 overlap
Butler				US-400 east	Northern end of US-400 overlap
Butler				US-54 east / K-254 west	Northern end of US-54 overlap; eastern terminus of K-254
Butler				US-50 east / US-56 east	Northern end of US-50 and US-56 overlap
Butler				I-35 / Kansas Turnpike	I-35 and Kansas Turnpike exit 76
Marion	Florence			US-50	
Marion				K-256 west	Eastern terminus of K-256
Marion				US-56 west / K-150 east	Southern end of US-56 overlap; western terminus of K-150; roundabout
Dickinson				US 56 Bus. east – Herington	Western terminus of US-56 Bus.; no access to US-56 Bus. from US-77 south/ US-56 west, no access to US-77 north/ US-56 east from US-56 Bus. west
Dickinson				US-56 east – Council Grove / US 56 Bus. west – Herington	Northern end of US-56 overlap; eastern terminus of US-56 Bus.
Dickinson–Morris county line				K-4	
Morris				K-209 west	Eastern terminus of K-209
Geary				K-157 west	Eastern terminus of K-157
Geary	Junction City			I-70 / US-40 / K-18 east	I-70 exit 295; southern end of K-18 overlap
Geary				K-18 west	Northern end of K-18 overlap
Geary				K-57	
Geary				K-57 south	Northern terminus of K-57
Geary				K-82 west	Southern end of K-82 overlap
Riley				K-82 north	Northern end of K-82 overlap
Riley	Riley			US-24 west	Southern end of US-24 overlap
Riley				US-24 east	Northern end of US-24 overlap
Riley				K-16 east	Western terminus of K-16
Marshall	Waterville			K-9 west	Southern end of K-9 overlap
Marshall				K-9 east	Southern end of K-9 overlap
Marshall	Marysville			US-36 east	Southern end of US-36 overlap
Marshall				US-36 west	Northern end of US-36 overlap
Marshall				K-233 east – Oketo	Northern terminus of K-57
Marshall				US 77 north	Continuation into Nebraska
1.000 mi = 1.609 km; 1.000 km = 0.621 mi: Concurrency terminus; Tolled

== Related routes ==
=== Herington business loop ===
U.S. Highway 77 Business
- Location: Herington, Kansas
- Existed: October 13, 1979–June 9, 1991

U.S. Route 77 Business (US-77 Bus.) was a short business loop through Herington, Kansas. US-77 Bus began at US-56 and US-77 south of Herington. US-77 Bus. ran north from here along with US-56 Bus. for 1.1 miles (1.8 km) then entered Herington. The highway then curved east and became Trapp Street. US-77 Bus. and US-56 Bus. then crossed Lime Creek then exited the city roughly 0.85 miles (1.37 km) later. The two business routes then reached their eastern terminus at US-56 and US-77.

US-77 Bus. was approved to be decommissioned in a meeting on June 9, 1991, leaving just US-56 Bus..

Major intersections

The entire route was in Dickinson County.

Location	mi	km	Destinations	Notes
	0.00	0.00	US-56 / US-77 / US 56 Bus. begins	Southern terminus; southern terminus of US-56 Bus.; southern end of US-56 Bus. overlap
			US-56 west / US-77 / US 56 Bus. ends	Northern terminus; northern terminus of US-56 Bus.; northern end of US-56 Bus. overlap
			US-56 east	Continuation beyond northern terminus
1.000 mi = 1.609 km; 1.000 km = 0.621 mi

=== Junction City business loop ===
U.S. Highway 77 Business
- Location: Junction City, Kansas
- Existed: October 13, 1979–December 2, 1988

U.S. Route 77 Business (US-77 Bus.) was a short business loop through Junction City, Kansas.
