= Smoky Hill Township, Geary County, Kansas =

Smoky Hill Township
- Township
- Location in Geary County
- Coordinates: 39°01′27″N 096°50′26″W
- Country: United States
- State: Kansas
- County: Geary

Area
  - Total: 65.25 sq mi (168.99 km^{2})
  - Land: 57.52 sq mi (148.97 km^{2})
  - Water: 7.73 sq mi (20.02 km^{2}) 11.85%
- Elevation: 1,138 ft (347 m)

Population (2020)
  - Total: 9,143
  - Density: 159.0/sq mi (61.37/km^{2})
- GNIS feature ID: 0476557

Smoky Hill Township is a township in Geary County, Kansas, United States. As of the 2020 census, its population was 9,143.

== History ==
Smoky Hill Township was organized in 1872.

== Geography ==
Smoky Hill Township covers an area of 65.25 square miles (169.0 km^{2}) and contains one incorporated settlement, Fort Riley-Camp Whiteside. According to the USGS, it contains three cemeteries: Alda, Alida and Saint Johns.

The streams of Curtis Creek, Fourmile Creek, Onemile Creek, Republican River, School Creek and Smoky Hill River run through this township.

== Transportation ==
Smoky Hill Township contains one airport or landing strip, Ritter Airport (historical).
