= List of U.S. Highways in Kansas =

- Highway marker for U.S. Highways 50 and 400

Highway names
- Interstates: Interstate nn (I-nn)
- US Highways: U.S. Highway nn (US-nn)
- State: K-nn

System links
- Kansas State Highway System; Interstate; US; State; Spurs

The U.S. Highways in Kansas are the segments of the United States Numbered Highway System within the state of Kansas.

== Mainline highways ==
Number	Length (mi)	Length (km)	Southern or western terminus	Northern or eastern terminus	Formed	Removed	Notes
US-24	435.95	701.59	Colorado state line west of Kanorado	Missouri state line in Kansas City	1936	current	
US-36	390	630	Colorado state line west of St. Francis	Missouri state line in Elwood	1926	current	
US-40	423.67	681.83	Colorado state line west of Weskan	Missouri state line in Kansas City	1926	current	
US 40N	—	—	—	—	1926	1936	Replaced by US-24; planned as US 40 in 1925
US 40S	—	—	—	—	1926	1936	Renumbered to US-40; planned as US 340 and US 46 in 1925
US-50	447.93	720.87	Colorado state line west of Coolidge	Missouri state line in Leawood	1928	current	
US 50N	—	—	—	—	1926	1956	Replaced by US-56; planned as US 50 in 1925
US 50S	—	—	—	—	1926	1956	Renumbered to US-50; planned as US 250 in 1925
US-54	378.22	608.69	Oklahoma state line southwest of Liberal	Missouri state line east of Fort Scott	1926	current	
US-56	471.45	758.73	Oklahoma state line south of Elkhart	Missouri state line in Mission Woods	1956	current	
US-59	210.44	338.67	Oklahoma state line south of Chetopa	Missouri state line east of Atchison	1934	current	
US-66	11.274	18.144	Oklahoma state line south of Baxter Springs	Missouri state line east of Galena	1926	1985	Replaced by US-69 Alt. and K-66
US-69	163	262	Oklahoma state line south of Treece	Missouri state line in Kansas City	1935	current	
US-73	91.12	146.64	I-70 in Bonner Springs	Nebraska state line north of Reserve	1926	current	
US 73E	—	—	—	—	1926	1934	Replaced by US-160 and US-69
US 73W	—	—	—	—	1926	1934	Replaced by US-59, K-39, US-169, and US-159
US-75	228	367	Oklahoma state line south of Caney	Nebraska state line north of Sabetha	1926	current	
US-77	234	377	Oklahoma state line south of Arkansas City	Nebraska state line north of Oketo	1926	current	
US-81	230.78	371.40	Oklahoma state line south of Caldwell	Nebraska state line north of Belleville	1926	current	
US-83	227.5	366.1	Oklahoma state line south of Liberal	Nebraska state line north of Cedar Bluffs	1926	current	
US-154	36	58	Dodge City	Mullinville	1926	1982	Redesignated as K-154 (now US-400)
US-156	101	163	Garden City	Ellsworth	1956	1982	Redesignated as K-156
US-159	52.3	84.2	US-59 in Nortonville	Nebraska state line north of Reserve	1935	current	
US-160	489.457	787.705	Colorado state line west of Saunders	Missouri state line east of Frontenac	1930	current	
US-166	163.22	262.68	US-81 in South Haven	Missouri state line east of Baxter Springs	1926	current	
US-169	135.393	217.894	Oklahoma state line south of Coffeyville	Missouri state line in Kansas City	1930	current	
US-177	3.51	5.65	Oklahoma state line south of South Haven	US-81 in South Haven	1929	current	
US-183	234.69	377.70	Oklahoma state line south of Sitka	Nebraska state line north of Phillipsburg	1930	current	
US 250	—	—	—	—	1925	1926	Renumbered to US 50S
US-270	3	4.8	US-54/US-83 in Liberal	Oklahoma state line south of Liberal	1930	current	
US-281	238.34	383.57	Oklahoma state line south of Hardtner	Nebraska state line north of Lebanon	1931	current	
US-283	217.004	349.234	Oklahoma state line south of Englewood	Nebraska state line north of Norton	1931	current	
US 340	—	—	—	—	1925	1926	Became US-40S; now US-40
US-383	139	224	US-40/US-183 in Oakley	Nebraska state line	1942	1982	Partially redesignated as K-383
US-400	465.556	749.240	Colorado state line west of Coolidge	Missouri state line east of Baxter Springs	1994	current	

== Special routes ==
Number	Length (mi)	Length (km)	Southern or western terminus	Northern or eastern terminus	Formed	Removed	Notes
US 24 Alt.	—	—	—	—	1965	1965	
US 24 Bus.	—	—	—	—	—	—	
US 40 Alt.	—	—	—	—	1954	1955	Became K-18
US 40 Alt.	—	—	—	—	1967	1979	Redesignated as US 40 Bus.
US 40 Alt.	—	—	—	—	1953	1963	Former routing of US-40; removed due to completion of I-70
US 40 Alt.	—	—	—	—	c. 1967	1981	Redesignated as US 40 Bus.
US 40 Bus.	2.3	3.7	I-70/US-40	I-70/US-40	1981	current	Former US-283 Spur
US 40 Bus.	—	—	—	—	1978	—	
US 40 Bus.	—	—	—	—	1961	1975	Became US 24
US 40 Bus.	—	—	—	—	1981	2013	Returned to city ownership
City US 40	—	—	—	—	—	—	
US 40 Opt.	—	—	—	—	—	1963	Partially replaced by US 40 Alt.
US 40 Spur	—	—	—	—	—	1986	
Temp. US 40	—	—	—	—	1942	1945	Partially replaced by US 77 and US 24
Temp. US 40	—	—	—	—	1935	1936	Became US 24, K-18 and K-114
US 50 Alt.	—	—	—	—	—	—	
US 50 Alt.	—	—	—	—	1954	1980	Became mainline US-50
US 50 Bus.	—	—	—	—	—	—	
US 50 Bus.	—	—	—	—	1981	2009	Removed when the US-400 bypass was built
US 50 Bus.	—	—	—	—	1979	2001	Became K-68 and US-59
US 50 Byp.	—	—	—	—	—	—	
US 50 Byp.	—	—	—	—	—	—	Former routing of US-50
US 50 Opt.	—	—	—	—	1936	1941	
US 50 Spur	—	—	—	—	1962	1979	Redesignated as US 50 Bus.
Temp. US 56	—	—	—	—	1957	1961	Became K-27
US 56 Bus.	—	—	US-56/US-77	US-56/US-77	1979	current	
US 59 Bus.	—	—	—	—	—	—	
US 69 Alt.	—	—	Oklahoma border	US-69/US-400 in Shawnee Township	1985	current	Former US-66
US 69 Alt.	—	—	—	—	1961	1981	Redesignated as US 69 Bus.
US 69 Alt.	—	—	—	—	1957	1981	Redesignated as US 69 Bus.
US 69 Bus.	—	—	US-69	US-69	1981	current	
US 69 Bus.	—	—	US-69	K-47	1981	current	
US 69 Bus.	—	—	—	—	—	—	
US 73 Alt.	—	—	—	—	1959	1959	Co-signed with US 24 Alt. and US 40 Alt.
US 73 Truck	—	—	—	—	—	—	
US 75 Bus.	—	—	—	—	—	—	
US 75 Alt.	—	—	—	—	1964	1965	Became US 24, US 75, US 75 Bypass, I-70 and I-470
US 75 Alt.	—	—	—	—	1964	1988	Former US 75, partially replaced by US 75 and K-214
US 75 Byp.	—	—	—	—	1966	1998	
US 77 Bus.	—	—	—	—	1998	2006	
US 77 Bus.	—	—	—	—	1979	1991	Renumbered to US 56 Bus.
US 77 Bus.	—	—	—	—	—	—	Became US 40 Bus. and K-57
US 77 Byp.	—	—	—	—	—	—	
US 77 Truck	—	—	—	—	—	—	
US 81 Alt.	—	—	—	—	1974	—	Became K-143
US 81 Bus.	—	—	I-135/US-81 southeast of Lindsborg	I-135/US-81 northeast of Lindsborg (concurrent with K-4)	1970	2012	
US 81 Bus.	—	—	—	—	—	—	
US 81 Bus.	6	9.7	I-135/US-81 southeast of McPherson (concurrent with K-61)	I-135/US-81 east of McPherson (concurrent with US-56)	1970	current	
US 81 Byp.	—	—	—	—	1961	1984	Became I-235
US 81 Byp.	—	—	—	—	—	1965	Became K-153 and US-81 Alt.
City US 81	—	—	—	—	—	—	
US 81 Truck	—	—	—	—	1939	1939	
US 83 Bus.	—	—	—	—	—	—	
US 83 Bus.	—	—	—	—	—	—	
US 83 Spur	—	—	—	—	—	—	Now US-50, US-83 and US-400
US 154 Spur	—	—	—	—	1948	1980	Became K-129; now part of US-56, US-283 and US-400
US 166 Bus.	—	—	US-166	US-166/K-99	1994	current	Former US-166
US 169 Bus.	—	—	—	—	—	—	
US 169 Alt.	—	—	—	—	—	—	
US 183 Alt.	—	—	—	—	1969	—	Became US 183 Bypass
US 183 Byp.	—	—	US-183	I-70/US-40	—	—	
US 281 Alt.	1.4	2.3	—	—	1955	1983	Became US 281 Bypass
US 281 Byp.	—	—	—	—	1983	current	Former US-281 Alt.
US 283 Spur	—	—	—	—	1963	1981	Redesignated US-40 Bus.
Former
