= Grandview Plaza, Kansas =

City in Geary County, Kansas

- City
- Location within Geary County and Kansas

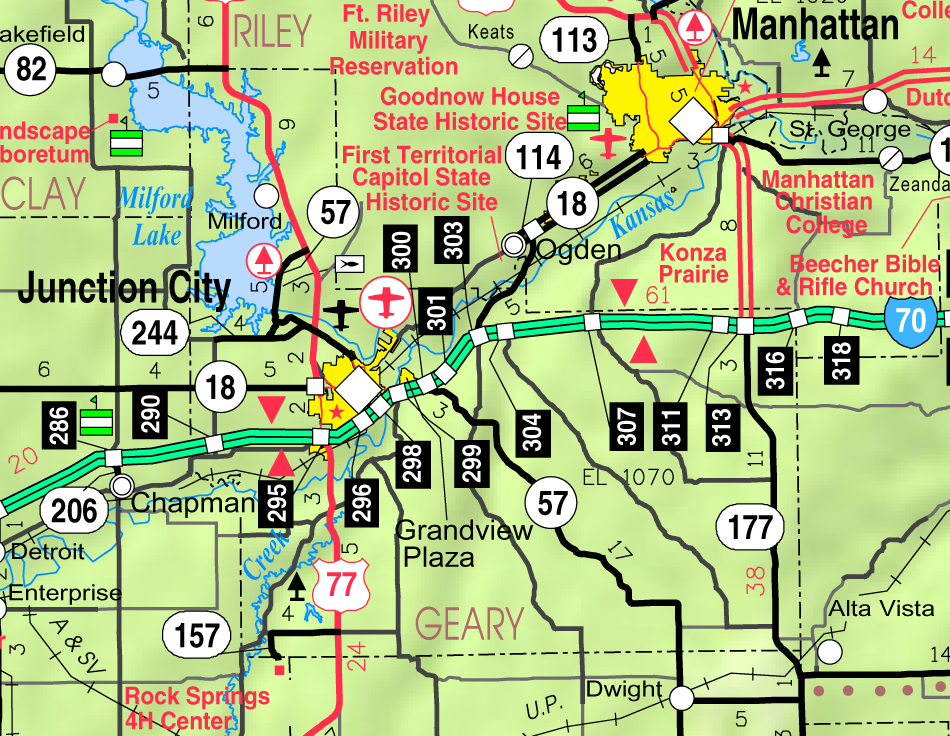
- KDOT map of Geary County (legend)
- Coordinates: 39°1′52″N 96°47′41″W
- Country: United States
- State: Kansas
- County: Geary

Area
  - Total: 0.86 sq mi (2.23 km^{2})
  - Land: 0.85 sq mi (2.19 km^{2})
  - Water: 0.015 sq mi (0.04 km^{2})
- Elevation: 1,135 ft (346 m)

Population (2020)
  - Total: 1,697
  - Density: 2,010/sq mi (775/km^{2})
- Time zone: UTC-6 (CST)
  - Summer (DST): UTC-5 (CDT)
- ZIP Code: 66441
- Area code: 785
- FIPS code: 20-27425
- GNIS ID: 484915
- Website: grandviewplaza.org

Grandview Plaza is a city in Geary County, Kansas, United States. As of the 2020 census, the population of the city was 1,697.

== History ==
Grandview Plaza was founded in 1963.

== Geography ==
Grandview Plaza is located at 39°1′52″N 96°47′41″W (39.031249, -96.794751). According to the United States Census Bureau, the city has a total area of 0.86 square miles (2.23 km^{2}), of which 0.84 square miles (2.18 km^{2}) is land and 0.02 square miles (0.05 km^{2}) is water.

=== Climate ===
The climate in this area is characterized by hot, humid summers and generally mild to cool winters. According to the Köppen Climate Classification system, Grandview Plaza has a humid subtropical climate, abbreviated "Cfa" on climate maps.

== Demographics ==
Historical population
Census	Pop.	Note	%±
1970	734		—
1980	1,189		62.0%
1990	1,233		3.7%
2000	1,184		−4.0%
2010	1,560		31.8%
2020	1,697		8.8%
U.S. Decennial Census

Grandview Plaza is part of the Manhattan, Kansas Metropolitan Statistical Area.

=== 2020 census ===
As of the 2020 census, Grandview Plaza had a population of 1,697, including 789 households and 426 families.

The population density was 2,003.5 per square mile (773.6/km^{2}). There were 987 housing units at an average density of 1,165.3 per square mile (449.9/km^{2}). 100.0% of residents lived in urban areas, while 0.0% lived in rural areas.

There were 789 households, of which 27.1% had children under the age of 18 living in them. Of all households, 39.8% were married-couple households, 33.5% were households with a male householder and no spouse or partner present, and 21.4% were households with a female householder and no spouse or partner present. About 38.4% of all households were made up of individuals and 6.9% had someone living alone who was 65 years of age or older. The average household size was 2.2 and the average family size was 2.8.

The median age was 27.5 years. Of the population, 21.0% was under the age of 18, 20.3% was from 18 to 24, 33.8% was from 25 to 44, 16.7% was from 45 to 64, and 8.2% was 65 years of age or older. For every 100 females, there were 118.4 males, and for every 100 females age 18 and over, there were 120.9 males age 18 and over.

Racial composition as of the 2020 census
Race	Number	Percent
White	978	57.6%
Black or African American	294	17.3%
American Indian and Alaska Native	22	1.3%
Asian	51	3.0%
Native Hawaiian and Other Pacific Islander	41	2.4%
Some other race	74	4.4%
Two or more races	237	14.0%
Hispanic or Latino (of any race)	258	15.2%

=== Education ===
The percent of those with a bachelor's degree or higher was estimated to be 16.8% of the population.

=== Income and poverty ===
The 2016–2020 5-year American Community Survey estimates show that the median household income was $44,054 (with a margin of error of +/- $6,677) and the median family income was $44,857 (+/- $15,039). Males had a median income of $31,517 (+/- $4,790) versus $23,902 (+/- $2,928) for females. The median income for those above 16 years old was $29,281 (+/- $5,458). Approximately, 6.1% of families and 13.0% of the population were below the poverty line, including 14.2% of those under the age of 18 and 11.0% of those ages 65 or over.

=== 2010 census ===
As of the census of 2010, there were 1,560 people, 651 households, and 430 families residing in the city. The population density was 1,857.1 inhabitants per square mile (717.0/km^{2}). There were 788 housing units at an average density of 938.1 per square mile (362.2/km^{2}). The racial makeup of the city was 72.1% White, 11.4% African American, 1.2% Native American, 1.9% Asian, 0.8% Pacific Islander, 3.7% from other races, and 8.9% from two or more races. Hispanic or Latino of any race were 11.5% of the population.

There were 651 households, of which 37.8% had children under the age of 18 living with them, 48.2% were married couples living together, 13.1% had a female householder with no husband present, 4.8% had a male householder with no wife present, and 33.9% were non-families. 26.6% of all households were made up of individuals, and 4% had someone living alone who was 65 years of age or older. The average household size was 2.36 and the average family size was 2.85.

The median age in the city was 25.3 years. 25.8% of residents were under the age of 18; 23.5% were between the ages of 18 and 24; 27% were from 25 to 44; 17.4% were from 45 to 64; and 6.3% were 65 years of age or older. The gender makeup of the city was 51.6% male and 48.4% female.

=== 2000 census ===
As of the census of 2000, there were 1,184 people, 458 households, and 333 families residing in the city. The population density was 1,406.4 inhabitants per square mile (543.0/km^{2}). There were 528 housing units at an average density of 627.2 per square mile (242.2/km^{2}). The racial makeup of the city was 78.12% White, 9.04% African American, 1.10% Native American, 3.46% Asian, 0.25% Pacific Islander, 3.46% from other races, and 4.56% from two or more races. Hispanic or Latino of any race were 6.08% of the population.

There were 458 households, out of which 38.6% had children under the age of 18 living with them, 52.0% were married couples living together, 17.0% had a female householder with no husband present, and 27.1% were non-families. 19.7% of all households were made up of individuals, and 3.5% had someone living alone who was 65 years of age or older. The average household size was 2.59 and the average family size was 2.92.

In the city, the population was spread out, with 29.3% under the age of 18, 12.6% from 18 to 24, 33.8% from 25 to 44, 18.0% from 45 to 64, and 6.3% who were 65 years of age or older. The median age was 30 years. For every 100 females, there were 96.4 males. For every 100 females age 18 and over, there were 95.6 males.

The median income for a household in the city was $31,033, and the median income for a family was $32,368. Males had a median income of $26,058 versus $17,344 for females. The per capita income for the city was $13,022. About 12.9% of families and 13.3% of the population were below the poverty line, including 17.4% of those under age 18 and none of those age 65 or over.

== Education ==
The community is served by Geary County USD 475 public school district.
