= List of state highways in Kansas =

- Highway marker for K-4, K-96, and K-177

Highway names
- Interstates: Interstate nn (I-nn)
- US Highways: U.S. Highway nn (US-nn)
- State: K-nn

System links
- Kansas State Highway System; Interstate; US; State; Spurs

The State Highways in Kansas are the state highways owned and maintained by the Kansas Department of Transportation (KDOT) in the U.S. state of Kansas. They are numbered with a K- prefix, e.g. K-10 or K-66.

== State highways ==
By Kansas law, no state highway may exist entirely within city limits. As a result, some highways have been given to cities as they annex the land around them, as is the case with the eastern branch of K-150 in the Kansas City area, which is now entirely within Olathe and Overland Park. This part of K-150 is now known as Santa Fe in Olathe and 135th Street in Overland Park.

Number	Length (mi)	Length (km)	Southern or western terminus	Northern or eastern terminus	Formed	Removed	Notes
K-1	13.363	21.506	SH-34 at the Oklahoma state line	US-160/183 south of Coldwater	1926	current	
K-2	61.516	99.000	US-281 east of Hardtner	K-42 near Norwich	1937	current	
K-2	—	—	—	—	1926	1930	Transferred to US-36
K-3	43.262	69.623	K-47 west of Girard	K-31 west of Blue Mound	1927	current	
K-4	369.079	593.975	US-83 north of Scott City	US-59 near Nortonville	1926	current	Longest state highway in Kansas
K-4 Alt.	1.100	1.770	K-4 near Nortonville	US-59 near Nortonville	1981	current	
K-5	24.072	38.740	US 73/K-7 in Leavenworth	US-69 in Kansas City	1926	current	
K-6	—	—	—	—	1926	1927	Renumbered K-9
K-6	—	—	—	—	1927	1958	Transferred to US-59
K-6	—	—	—	—	1968	1981	Proposed but transferred to K-5
K-7	240.606	387.218	Oklahoma state line near Treece	Nebraska state line north of White Cloud	1926	current	
K-8	17.254	27.768	Oklahoma state line south of Kiowa US-36 west of Athol	K-2 in Kiowa N-10 north of Athol	1926	current	Two segments of highway
K-9	317.937	511.670	K-123 on the Decatur–Sheridan county line near Leoville	US-73 near Lancaster	1927	current	Second longest state highway in Kansas
K-9	—	—	—	—	1926	1927	Renumbered K-6
K-10	36.611	58.920	I-70/Kansas Turnpike in Lawrence	I-435 in Lenexa	1926	current	
K-11	16.662	26.815	US-54/US-400 west of Kingman	K-61 west of Arlington	2012	current	Former section of K-14
K-11	—	—	—	—	1940	1959	Former portion of K-8; became a disconnected portion of K-8
K-11	—	—	—	—	1926	1938	Renumbered K-99 to match Oklahoma
K-12	15.4	24.8	K-7 in Shawnee	Missouri state line in Kansas City	1965	1987	Returned to city ownership
K-12	—	—	—	—	1939	c. 1947	Transferred to US-166
K-12	—	—	—	—	1927	1936	Transferred to K-51
K-12	—	—	K-11 in Wheaton	K-4 in Valley Falls	1926	1927	Renumbered K-24
K-12 Spur	0.376	0.605	K-12 in Johnson County	I-35 in Larned	1984	1987	Former K-10 Spur, returned to city ownership
K-13	14.617	23.524	US-24 in Manhattan	K-16 northwest of Westmoreland	1926	current	
K-14	219.276	352.891	US-160/K-2 in Harper	N-14 at the Nebraska state line north of Mankato	1926	current	
K-15	257.141	413.828	SH-18 at the Oklahoma state line	N-15 at the Nebraska state line	1926	current	Third longest state highway in Kansas
K-15W	—	—	—	—	1936	1988	Became part of K-15
K-15E	—	—	—	—	1936	1988	Became part of K-148
K-16	114.460	184.206	US-77 at Randolph	US-24/US-40 in Tonganoxie	1935	current	
K-16	—	—	Oklahoma state line	Troy	1926	1935	Became K-7 and US 169
K-17	21.138	34.018	US-54/US-400 near Waterloo	K-96 at Crupper’s Corner	1926	2012	Became a portion of K-14
K-18	205.999	331.523	US-24 in Bogue	K-99 south of Wamego	1926	current	
K-19	33.915	54.581	US-50 in Belpre	US-281 near Seward	1926	current	Signed as north–south from US-50 to K-19 Spur, and east–west from K-19 Spur to US-281
K-19 Spur	0.800	1.287	K-19 near Larned	US-56 in Larned	1932	current	
K-20	—	—	K-96 in Dighton	US-40 in Hoxie	1926	1927	Became K-23
K-20	37.210	59.884	US-75 north of Netawaka	K-7 east of Bendena	1927	current	
K-21	—	—	—	—	1926	1941	Became part of US-283
K-22	3.087	4.968	US-36 south of Haddam	Haddam city limits	1940	current	
K-22	—	—	—	—	1926	1931	Became part of US-83
K-22	—	—	Wichita	Topeka	1930	1938	Overlapped US-81, US-56, K-99, and US-40
K-23	199.117	320.448	SH-23 at the Oklahoma state line	US-83/K-383 northeast of Selden	1927	current	
K-23 Alt.	1.828	2.942	K-23 near Grainfield	K-23 near Grainfield	1958	current	
K-23 Spur	0.300	0.483	I-70/US-40 near Grainfield	K-23 near Grainfield	1959	current	
K-23	—	—	—	—	1926	1927	Renumbered K-25
K-24	—	—	—	—	1927	1935	Renumbered K-16 when US 24 was extended into Kansas
K-24	—	—	US 73E in Trading Post	Missouri state line	1926	1927	Renumbered K-56
K-25	—	—	—	—	1926	1927	Renumbered K-27
K-25	238.259	383.441	SH-136 at the Oklahoma state line	N-25 at the Nebraska state line	1927	current	
K-26	3.601	5.795	US-166/US-400 in Galena	K-66 in Galena	1937	current	
K-26	—	—	—	—	1927	1932	Transferred to US-177
K-27	226.241	364.100	US-56 near Elkhart	N-27 at the Nebraska state line	1927	current	
K-27	—	—	Whiting	Horton	1926	1927	
K-28	29.019	46.702	K-14 in Jewell	K-9 west of Concordia	1926	current	
K-29	—	—	—	—	1927	1957	Transferred to K-18
K-30	1.950	3.138	I-70/US 40 south of Maple Hill	Maple Hill city limits	—	—	
K-30	—	—	—	—	1927	1937	Transferred to K-24 (now K-16) and K-92 in 1932; remaining section transferred to US-40 in 1937
K-31	134	216	US-69 southeast of Fulton	K-99 south of Eskridge	1926	current	
K-32	32.197	51.816	US-24/US-40 northeast of Lawrence	US-69 in Kansas City	1927	current	
K-33	10.405	16.745	K-68 north of Rantoul	US-56 north of Wellsville	1926	current	
K-34	29.260	47.089	US-183/US-160 north of Sitka	US-400 northwest of Bucklin	1937	current	
K-34	—	—	—	—	1927	1937	Transferred to K-26, K-37, and K-96 so that K-34 could be reused to match Oklahoma
K-34	—	—	Waverly	Garnett	1926	1927	Transferred to K-31
K-35	—	—	—	—	1926	1957	Renumbered K-135 (now K-152)
K-36	—	—	Oklahoma state line near Elkhart	Missouri state line near Pittsburg	1926	1927	Renumbered K-12
K-37	—	—	US-75	US-169	1937	1998	Former K-34; returned to county ownership due to completion of nearby US 400
K-37	—	—	—	—	1926	1936	Became a portion of K-19 (later K-45, now US 56)
K-38	12.990	20.905	K-15 north of Dexter	Ranch Road Road 2 southwest of Grenola	1937	1997	Now a county road
K-38	—	—	—	—	1927	1936	Transferred to K-31
K-39	65.032	104.659	US-400 northwest of Fredonia	K-7 east of Hiattville	1926	current	
K-39 Spur	3.772	6.070	K-39 near Roper	US-75 near Buffalo	c. 1955	c. 1960	Became K-39
K-41	4.960	7.982	Delphos city limits	US-81 north of Minneapolis	1937	current	
K-41	—	—	—	—	1927	1937	Transferred to K-34
K-41	—	—	K-36 near Meade	US-54 near Bucklin	1926	1927	Became extension of US-54
K-42	75.061	120.799	US-281 on the outskirts of Sawyer	I-235 in southwest Wichita	1926	current	
K-43	20.718	33.342	K-4 in Hope	I-70/US-40 north of Detroit	1926	current	
K-44	24.674	39.709	K-2 in Anthony	K-49 north of Caldwell	1926	current	
K-45	—	—	—	—	1926	1966	Transferred to US-156 (now K-156); one part was transferred to US-56 a few years earlier
K-46	1.315	2.116	US-56 between McPherson and Lyons	Little River city limits	1933	2013	Returned to county ownership
K-46	—	—	Colorado state line	K-22 in Santa Fe	1926	1930	Transferred to US-160
K-47	61.556	99.065	US-400 in Fredonia	US-69 in Franklin	1927	current	
K-48	0.775	1.247	—	—	1939	1980	
K-48	—	—	—	—	1927	1937	Transferred to K-52
K-49	35.354	56.897	US-81 in Caldwell	K-42 north of Viola	1927	current	
K-51	79.095	127.291	Baca County Road M at the Colorado state line	US-83 north of Liberal	1927	current	
K-52	23.045	37.087	US-59/K-31 west of Kincaid	Route 52 at the Missouri state line	1937	current	
K-52	—	—	—	—	1927	1932	Transferred to K-4
K-53	6.177	9.941	US-81 near Peck	K-15 in Mulvane	1927	current	
K-55	12.049	19.391	US-81 west of Belle Plaine	K-15 in Udall	1927	current	
K-56	—	—	—	—	1937	1957	Transferred to K-98
K-56	—	—	—	—	1927	1937	Transferred to K-52
K-57	31.200	50.212	K-4 near Dwight	US-77 near Milford State Park north of Junction City	1926	current	
K-58	46.761	75.255	K-99 west of Madison	US-169 near Colony	2004	current	Former section of K-57
K-58	—	—	I-35 in Lenexa	K-5 in Kansas City	—	1978	Returned to city ownership
K-59	—	—	Halstead	—	1927	1935	Renumbered to K-89
K-60	4.284	6.894	US-36 southeast of Almena, KS	K-383 near Almena, KS	1927	current	
K-61	83.358	134.152	US-54/US-400 in Pratt	I-135/US-81/US-81 Bus. southeast of McPherson	1927	current	
K-62	13.339	21.467	K-16 near Soldier	K-9 in Goff	1927	current	
K-63	58.769	94.580	US-24 in St. Marys	N-50 at the Nebraska state line	1927	current	
K-64	3.574	5.752	US-281 south of Pratt	US-54/US-400 east of Pratt	1927	2015	Returned to county ownership
K-65	11.160	17.960	K-3 near the Bourbon–Allen county line	K-31 in Mapleton	1935	current	Former K-69
K-65	—	—	—	—	1927	1933	Transferred to US-281
K-66	5.527	8.895	US-400/Alternate US-69 in Galena	Route 66 at the Missouri State line east of Galena	1985	current	Historic U.S. Route 66
K-67	0.972	1.564	US-36/K-383 near Norton	Norton Correctional Facility	1932	current	
K-68	61.517	99.002	US-75/K-31 south of Lyndon	Route 2 at the Missouri state line	1932	current	
K-69	—	—	—	—	1932	1935	Renumbered to K-65
K-70	—	—	—	—	1932	1957	Renumbered to K-170
K-71	4.581	7.372	K-63 near Bern	Bern	1932	current	
K-72	—	—	US-40	Basehor	1932	1973	
K-74	3.440	5.536	Potter city limits	US-73/K-7 east of Potter	1932	2013	Returned to county ownership
K-76	0.325	0.523	Williamstown	US-24/US-59 near Williamstown	1932	2014	Shortest state highway at the time; returned to county ownership
K-78	1.057	1.701	Miller	US-56 north of Miller	1932	current	
K-79	3.561	5.731	K-16 south of Circleville	Circleville city limits	1932	current	
K-80	3.816	6.141	Morganville city limits	K-15 east of Morganville	1932	current	
K-82	21.076	33.919	K-15 west of Wakefield	US-24 west of Leonardville	1932	current	
K-84	0.881	1.418	Penokee	US-24 north of Penokee	1935	current	
K-85	0.800	1.287	Morland	US-24 north of Morland	1935	current	
K-86	0.3	0.48	US-56	Canton city limits	1935	2009	Returned to county ownership
K-87	8.6	13.8	Vliets	US-36 near Beattie	1935	current	
K-88	0.3	0.48	Vermillion	K-9 north of Vermillion	1935	current	
K-89	1.514	2.437	Halstead	US-50 north of Halstead	1935	current	
K-90	2.180	3.508	Leavenworth State Fishing Lake	K-16	1936	1997	Returned to county ownership
K-92	44.061	70.909	K-4 near Rock Creek	Route 92 at the Missouri state line at Leavenworth	1926	current	
K-93	—	—	US-81 near Minneapolis	Ottawa State Fishing Lake	1936	1994	Replaced by K-106
K-94	10.780	17.349	Clark County State Lake	US-54 in Kingsdown	1962	current	
K-95	6.591	10.607	US-83 north of Scott City	US-83 south of Elkader	1966	current	Serves Lake Scott State Park
K-96	300.201	483.127	SH 96 at the Colorado state line	US-54/US-400 on the east side of Wichita	1926	current	
K-97	—	—	—	—	1941	1957	Removed when the state park it served fell out of use
K-98	9.048	14.561	K-23 north of Meade	US-54 in Fowler	1956	current	Formerly designated as K-56
K-98	—	—	Meade State Park southwest of Meade	K-23 south of Meade	1939	1961	Became a portion of K-23
K-99	234.473	377.348	SH-99 at the Oklahoma state line south of Chautauqua	N-99 at the Nebraska state line north of Summerfield	1938	current	
K-100	0.6	0.97	I-70/US-40/K-4 in Topeka (exit 357A)	Dead end at the Kansas Governor's Residence in Topeka	1957	1978	
K-101	9.998	16.090	US-166 near Edna	US-160 near Mound Valley	1937	current	
K-102	5.004	8.053	West Mineral city limits	K-7 at Scammon	1940	current	
K-103	6.980	11.233	K-7 south of Cherokee	US-69/US-160/US-400 east of Weir	1940	current	
K-104	2.275	3.661	K-4 north of Assaria	I-135/US-81 near Mentor	1967	current	
K-104	—	—	—	—	1940	1943	Renumbered K-126 to match Missouri
K-104	—	—	—	—	1943	1958	Became a portion of rerouted US-160
K-105	10.425	16.777	Toronto State Park	US-54 north of Toronto	1941	current	
K-106	16.254	26.158	K-18 east of Tescott	Ottawa State Fishing Lake	1944	current	
K-107	4.83	7.77	K-32 in Edwardsville	US-24/US-40/US-73 west of Kansas City	1937	1978	
K-108	1.5	2.4	Intersection of US-59 and Fourth Street in Erie	Intersection of US-59 and State Street in Erie	1946	2004	Returned to city ownership
K-109	—	—	Liberty	US-169 east of Liberty	1946	1947	Proposed but never designated
K-110	1.760	2.832	US-36 south of Axtell	Axtell city limits	1948	current	
K-111	5.334	8.584	Kanopolis city limits	K-156 northeast of Ellsworth	1948	current	
K-112	2.483	3.996	US-36 south of Esbon	Esbon city limits	1950	current	
K-113	5.631	9.062	K-18 in Manhattan	US-24 between Tuttle Creek Lake and Manhattan	1936	current	
K-114	0.9	1.4	Ogden	K-18 near Ogden	1973	current	Former section of K-18
K-114	0.376	0.605	US-73/K-20 near Everest	Everest	1950	1964	Became a portion of K-20
K-115	0.650	1.046	Palmer	K-9/K-15 near Palmer	1946	current	
K-116	26.146	42.078	K-16/US-75 in Holton	US-59 near Cummings	1937	current	
K-117	11.977	19.275	US-36 south of Herndon	N-17 at the Nebraska state line	1937	current	
K-119	0.761	1.225	K-9/K-148 near Greenleaf	Greenleaf	1947	current	
K-120	9.126	14.687	K-20 south of Severance	Main Street in Highland	1945	current	
K-121	0.451	0.726	US-36 west of Phillipsburg	Stuttgart	1952	2014	Returned to county ownership
K-122	—	—	—	—	1952	1960	Became a portion of US-36
K-123	5.544	8.922	K-23 near the Decatur–Sheridan county line	K-383 in Dresden	1940	current	Former section of K-23
K-124	1	1.6	K-14 in Beloit	US-24 in Beloit	1958	1986	
K-126	26.918	43.320	US-400 south of McCune	Route 126 at the Missouri state line	1945	current	
K-127	0.276	0.444	—	—	1956	1962	Removed due to annexation by city of Elkhart
K-128	36.886	59.362	US-24 at Waconda Lake	N-78 at the Nebraska state line	1937	current	One portion former US-24
K-129	0.446	0.718	K-154 in Dodge City	US-56/US-283/U.S. Route 50 Business in Dodge City	1980	1996	Former US-154 Spur, became a portion of US-56/US-283/US-400
K-129	—	—	—	—	1947	c. 1963	Removed due to completion of K-124
K-130	7.818	12.582	Hartford	I-35/US-50 north of Neosho Rapids	1951	current	
K-131	0.521	0.838	Lebo	I-35/US-50 near Lebo	1949	current	
K-132	8.6	13.8	I-70 in Kansas City	US-69 in Kansas City	1937	1993	Former Temporary K-32, partially replaced by K-32
K-133	0.491	0.790	US-160	Dennis city limits	1954	1995	Removed due to rerouting of US-160 and US-400
K-134	0.231	0.372	US-166	Bartlett city limits	1954	2000	Returned to county ownership
K-135	—	—	—	—	1957	1977	Former K-35; renumbered K-152
K-136	0.322	0.518	Troy	US-36 north of Troy	2004	current	Former section of K-7
K-136	—	—	—	—	1945	1985	Removed in 1991 due to realignment of US-36
K-137	0.25	0.40	Purcell	K-20 in Purcell	1952	current	
K-138	1.086	1.748	I-70/US-40 west of Paxico	Paxico	1952	current	
K-139	1.000	1.609	Cuba city limits	US-36 north of Cuba	1954	current	
K-140	33.224	53.469	K-14 in Ellsworth	I-135/US-81 in Salina	1968	current	Former routing of US-40S (later US-40)
K-141	13.470	21.678	K-4 west of Marquette	K-140 northeast of Carneiro	1956	current	
K-143	4.658	7.496	I-70/US-40 at Salina	US-81 north of Salina	1981	current	Former US-81 Alt.
K-144	16.825	27.077	US-83/US-160 in central Haskell County	US-56 between Copeland and Montezuma	1957	current	
K-145	1.900	3.058	US-83/US-160 west of Sublette	US-56 in Sublette	1939	1965	Removed because the route was no longer needed
K-146	15.564	25.048	US-59 north of Erie	K-3 north of Brazilton	1956	current	
K-147	25.930	41.730	K-4 near Brownell	Centre Street in Ogallah	1956	current	
K-148	86.665	139.474	K-28 near Randall	N-112 at the Nebraska state line	1956	current	
K-149	6.098	9.814	US-56 between Delavan and Wilsey	K-4 northeast of Herington Municipal Airport	1957	current	
K-150	16.645	26.788	US-56/US-77 near Marion	US-50 west of Elmdale	1937	current	
K-150	—	—	K-7 on the northwest side of Olathe	Route 150 at the Missouri state line	1955	1996	Returned to city ownership
K-152	12.919	20.791	K-7 east of Parker	US-69 south of Linn Valley	1977	current	Former K-135, and before that, K-35
K-153	3.451	5.554	K-61 southwest of McPherson	US-56 in McPherson	1968	current	Former US-81 and K-61 and formerly K-61 Alt.
K-153 Spur	1.067	1.717	K-61 south of McPherson	K-153 southwest of McPherson	1968	current	Former section of US-81 and formerly K-61 Spur
K-154	—	—	US-50 in Dodge City	US-54 near Mullinville	1981	1996	Former US-154, transferred to US-400
K-155	—	—	—	—	1966	1967	Proposed but became a portion of US-81
K-156	175.663	282.702	US-50 Bus./US-50 Bus. in Garden City	I-70/US-40 in Ellsworth	1981	current	Former US-156
K-157	3.866	6.222	Rock Springs 4H Center	US-77 south of Junction City	1950	current	
K-158	1.600	2.575	US-69 in Kansas City	K-58 in Kansas City	1953	1978	Returned to city ownership
K-161	17.000	27.359	US-36 on the northwest side of Bird City	N-61 at the Nebraska state line	1954	current	
K-162	—	—	US-160/US-183 south of Protection	Protection	1963	1977	Removed due to annexation by the city of Protection
K-163	0.485	0.781	Garden Plain	US-54/US-400 north of Garden Plain	1966	2013	Returned to county ownership
K-164	—	—	Valley Center	I-135/US-81/K-15 east of Valley Center	1967	1985	Returned to county ownership
K-165	—	—	Hesston	I-135/US-81 north of Hesston	1967	1985	
K-167	0.506	0.814	K-96 near Marienthal	Marienthal	1958	current	
K-168	0.527	0.848	US-56/K-15 near Lehigh	Lehigh	1970	current	Former routing of US-56
K-170	21.759	35.018	K-99 west of Reading	K-31 in Osage City	1957	current	
K-171	4.890	7.870	US-400/US-69 south of Pittsburg	Route 171 at the Missouri state line east of Opolis	2003	current	Former section of K-57
K-171	—	—	Bushton	K-4 north of Bushton	1958	2010	Returned to county ownership
K-172	—	—	Kansas Youth Center in Topeka	US-40/US-75 Alt./K-4 in Topeka	1957	1978	
K-173	0.650	1.046	Densmore	K-9 near Densmore	1956	current	
K-174	—	—	US-75/K-31 west of Melvern	Melvern	1956	1968	Redesignated as K-31
K-175	0.500	0.805	Marquette	K-4 north of Marquette	1956	2013	Returned to county ownership
K-176	—	—	Lucas	K-18 north of Lucas	—	2006	
K-177	102.871	165.555	US-54 east of El Dorado	US-24 in Manhattan	1964	current	Was a portion of K-13 until 1965; only state highway to match a U.S. Highway number in Kansas
K-178	3.513	5.654	US-36 near Seneca	St. Benedict city limits	1957	current	
K-179	11.588	18.649	SH-132 at the Oklahoma state line	K-2 and K-44 in Anthony	1955	current	
K-180	0.307	0.494	K-4 south of Alta Vista	Alta Vista	1956	2001	Route removed from system due to annexation by the city of Alta Vista
K-181	70.218	113.005	K-232 at the Lincoln–Russell county line, near Wilson Lake	US-36/US-281 south of Lebanon	1937	current	
K-182	0.914	1.471	US-36 near Bellaire	Bellaire	1955	current	
K-184	1.578	2.540	I-70/US-24 south of Brewster	Brewster city limits	1955	current	
K-185	0.650	1.046	McFarland	I-70/US-40 near McFarland	1955	current	
K-186	1.600	2.575	Menlo	US-24 north of Menlo	1955	current	
K-187	7.999	12.873	K-9 in Centralia	US-36 west of Seneca	1955	current	
K-188	3.100	4.989	Seguin	US-24 north of Seguin	1956	current	
K-189	0.915	1.473	Miltonvale	US-24 north of Miltonvale	1954	current	
K-190	24.172	38.901	US-83/US-160 near the Haskell–Seward county line east of Satanta	US-160 near the Haskell–Grant county line north of Ryus	1954	current	
K-191	0.999	1.608	Geographic center of the contiguous United States	US-281 north of Lebanon	1954	current	
K-192	16.241	26.137	US-59 near Winchester	US-73/K-7 north of Leavenworth	1939	current	
K-193	0.467	0.752	Asherville	US-24 near Asherville	1954	current	
K-194	1.580	2.543	Simpson	US-24 north of Simpson	1954	current	
K-195	0.370	0.595	K-31	Harveyville	1954	current	
K-196	28.474	45.824	I-135/US-81/K-15 south of Newton	K-254 near El Dorado	1937	current	
K-197	2.000	3.219	Industry	K-15 east of Industry	1957	current	
K-198	0.811	1.305	I-70/US-40 near Collyer	Collyer	1958	current	
K-199	0.832	1.339	Courtland	US-36 near Courtland	1958	current	
K-201	0.786	1.265	US-59 near Stark	Stark	1958	2013	Returned to county ownership
K-202	0.698	1.123	US-59 near Savonburg	Savonburg	1958	2013	Returned to county ownership
K-203	0.633	1.019	US-59 near Elsmore	Elsmore	1958	2013	Returned to county ownership
K-204	2.116	3.405	US-36 west of Smith Center	US-281 in Smith Center	1958	current	
K-205	0.752	1.210	Milan	US-160 north of Milan	1959	2014	Returned to county ownership
K-206	0.932	1.500	Chapman	I-70/US-40	1958	2015	
K-207	0.600	0.966	I-70/K-18/K-207 Alt. in Junction City	US-40 Bus. in Junction City	1958	1992	Returned to county ownership
K-207 Alt.	0.520	0.837	US-40 Bus./US-77 Alt. in Junction City	I-70/K-18/K-207 in Junction City	1959	1992	Returned to county ownership
K-208	0.201	0.323	K-4 in Valley Falls	K-16 in Valley Falls	1961	1967	Removed due to rerouting of K-4 and K-16
K-209	2.455	3.951	Woodbine	US-77 east of Woodbine	1960	current	
K-210	0.144	0.232	Argonia	US-160 north of Argonia	1959	2014	Returned to county ownership
K-211	1.035	1.666	I-70/US-40 exit 99	Old US-40 on the outskirts of Park	1959	current	
K-212	0.653	1.051	I-70/US-40 exit 107	Quinter	1959	2014	Returned to city ownership
K-213	5.708	9.186	K-13 northwest of Manhattan	US-77/K-16 in Randolph	1957	1964	Became K-177
K-214	1.967	3.166	US-75 on the southwest side of Hoyt	US-75 on the northwest side of Hoyt	1961	current	
K-215	0.488	0.785	Goessel	K-15 near Goessel	1952	current	
K-216	0.585	0.941	I-70/US-40 near Grinnell	Grinnell	1962	current	
K-217	0.500	0.805	US-36/K-27 east of St. Francis	Wheeler	1959	2014	Returned to county ownership
K-218	1.773	2.853	Herington	K-4 northwest of Herington	1960	current	
K-219	0.995	1.601	K-19 south of Seward	Seward city limits	1950	2014	Returned to county ownership
K-220	—	—	New Cambria	I-70/US-40 north of New Cambria	1959	1973	Removed because the route was no longer needed
K-221	—	—	Solomon	I-70/US-40 north of Solomon	1959	2013	
K-222	0.399	0.642	US-160	Mound Valley	1966	2000	Returned to county ownership in exchange for construction of US-400 bypass of Parsons
K-222	—	—	—	—	1960	1962	Removed because the route was retained as US 69 Alt.
K-223	2.615	4.208	K-23 near the Decatur—Sheridan county line	K-383 near Leoville	1958	current	
K-224	1.039	1.672	Humboldt city limits	US-169 east of Humboldt	1977	2013	Returned to county ownership
K-225	—	—	—	—	1960	1979	Redesignated US-81
K-226	0.300	0.483	—	—	1961	1979	
K-227	—	—	K-4/US-59 in Atchison	K-9/US-73 in Atchison	1968	1980	Became US-73
K-228	0.400	0.644	K-128 west of Ionia	Ionia	1945	current	
K-229	—	—	—	—	1960	1977	Removed due to rerouting of K-96
K-230	—	—	Mount Hope	K-96 near Mount Hope	1960	1995	Former section of K-96
K-231	—	—	Dorrance	I-70/US-40 north of Dorrance	1961	2006	Returned to city ownership
K-232	17.263	27.782	Old US-40 in Wilson	K-18 east of Lucas	1961	current	
K-233	3.481	5.602	US-77 west of Oketo	Oketo city limits	1961	current	
K-234	0.347	0.558	Hanover	K-148 near Hanover	1961	current	
K-236	1.535	2.470	US-36 south of Oneida	Oneida city limits	1961	current	
K-237	3.351	5.393	US-24 between Grantville and Perry	Entrance to Perry State Park; road continues along the west side of Lake Perry.	1961	current	
K-238	1.433	2.306	US-36 in Elwood	Missouri state line south of Rosecrans Memorial Airport	1961	current	
K-239	5.677	9.136	US-69 at Prescott	Route A at the Missouri state line	1962	current	
K-241	—	—	—	—	1960	1991	Returned to county ownership
K-242	—	—	—	—	1962	1984	Removed because the park it served became a national park
K-243	0.942	1.516	K-148 near Hanover	Hollenberg Pony Express Station	1962	current	
K-244	3.940	6.341	Geary County road south of Milford Lake	K-57/US-77 northwest of Junction City	1964	current	
K-245	0.330	0.531	K-4 south of Meriden	Meriden	1961	2014	Returned to county ownership
K-246	5.572	8.967	US-75 on the outskirts of Sabetha	Morill city limits	1962	current	
K-247	0.123	0.198	Ellis	I-70/US-40 north of Ellis	1963	current	
K-248	0.997	1.605	180 Road near Kensington	US-36 in Kensington	1962	current	
K-249	0.68	1.09	K-99	K-58	1963	current	
K-251	3.671	5.908	US-54/US-400 north of Cheney	CR-556 near Cheney Reservoir	1963	current	
K-252	0.453	0.729	Beverly	K-18 north of Beverly	1964	current	
K-253	0.674	1.085	I-70/US-24 near Edson	Old U.S. Highway 24 in Edson	1966	current	
K-253	—	—	—	—	1959	1965	Redesignated US-77
K-254	27.369	44.046	I-135/I-235/US-81/K-15/K-96 in Wichita	US-54/US-77 in El Dorado	1957	current	
K-255	1.195	1.923	Victoria city limits	I-70/US-40 north of Victoria	1964	current	
K-256	4.989	8.029	US-56 west of Marion	US-77 east of Marion	1985	current	Former routing of US-56
K-257	0.932	1.500	I-70/US-40 south of Gorham	Gorham	1964	2006	Returned to city ownership
K-258	—	—	K-158 in Kansas City	US 169 in Kansas City	1957	1964	
K-258	3.902	6.280	Webster Reservoir	US-24 west of Stockton	1964	current	
K-259	0.200	0.322	K-16 northeast of Onaga	Onaga city limits	1964	1991	Returned to county ownership
K-260	3.261	5.248	I-135 / US-81 north of Moundridge	I-135 / US-81 east of Moundridge	1966	current	
K-261	1.201	1.933	Prairie Dog State Park	US-36 north of Prairie Dog State Park	1964	current	
K-263	0.642	1.033	Paola city limits	US-169/K-7 southeast of Paola	1969	1997	Returned to city ownership
K-264	1.033	1.662	Larned State Hospital	K-156 west of Larned	1965	current	
K-265	—	—	—	—	1965	1988	Unbuilt spur from a proposed routing of US-24 to Leonardville; cancelled because the proposed rerouted US-24 was not built
K-266	7.541	12.136	US-36 west of Scandia	Pawnee Indian Museum State Historic Site	1967	current	
K-267	0.837	1.347	I-70/US-24 south of Kanorado	Kanorado	1966	current	
K-268	9.490	15.273	K-31/US-75 north of Lyndon	K-68 north of Quenemo	1962	current	
K-269	—	—	US-169 near Bassett	US-54 in Iola	1980	1991	Redesignated K-57/US-169
K-271	0.657	1.057	Mayfield	US-160 north of Mayfield	1967	2014	Returned to county ownership
K-272	—	—	—	—	1969	1971	Returned to city ownership (this did not happen until 1973) due to rerouting of US-81
K-273	0.438	0.705	Williamsburg	I-35/US-50	1968	2002	Removed from system due to annexation by the city of Williamsburg
K-274	0.416	0.669	Agricultural Research Center south of Hays	US-183 Byp. in Hays	1969	2009	Returned to county ownership
K-276	1.384	2.227	Olivet city limits	US-75 east of Olivet	1970	current	
K-277	0.710	1.143	K-7 north of Farlington	Lake Crawford	1992	2013	Returned to county ownership
K-278	2.988	4.809	Eisenhower State Park	US-75/K-31 northwest of Melvern	1970	current	
K-279	0.489	0.787	Osawatomie State Hospital in Osawatomie	US-169/K-7 in Osawatomie	1972	current	
K-284	5.618	9.041	K-14 south of the Lincoln–Mitchell county line	Barnard	1972	current	
K-285	0.218	0.351	K-10 near De Soto	Lexington Avenue in De Soto	1976	1995	Former section of K-10, designated in 1972; removed due to annexation by city of De Soto
K-292	0.750	1.207	K-92 northeast of Springdale	K-92 northeast of Springdale	1945	1960	Was K-92 from 1926 to 1932; removed when a bridge on the route burned down following a lightning strike
K-296	15.668	25.215	K-96 east of Mount Hope	K-96 near Maize	1965	1996	Returned to county ownership
K-334	—	—	—	—	1963	c. 1965	Became K-34
K-360	3.469	5.583	US-77 south of Winfield	US-160/K-15 east of Winfield	1997	current	
K-368	1.000	1.609	K-268 east of Vassar	Pomona State Park	1962	current	
K-383	74.042	119.159	US-83/K-23 northeast of Selden	US-183 just south of the Nebraska state line east of Woodruff	1981	current	Formerly US-383
Former
