= Turner Bridge =

K-32 Turner Bridge
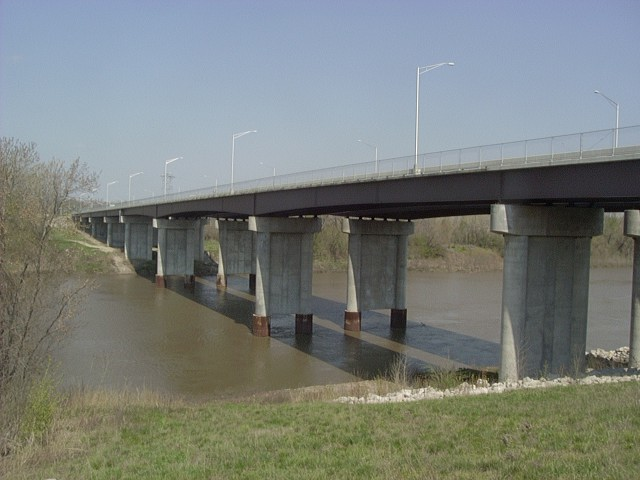
- The new bridge in 2007
- Coordinates: 39.0934°N 94.7100°W
- Carries: 5 lanes of K-32 (Turner Diagonal) (two east, three west)
- Crosses: Kansas River
- Locale: Kansas City, Kansas
- Official name: Turner Diagonal Memorial Bridge
- Maintained by: KDOT

Characteristics
- Design: Thru-Truss (first bridge), Girder (second and current bridge)

History
- Opened: 1955 (first bridge), 2002 (second and current bridge)

Location
- Interactive map of K-32 Turner Bridge

The K-32 Turner Bridge was a bridge that crossed the Kansas River during its almost 60 mile journey through Kansas City, and Topeka. It first opened in 1955 as a two lane steel through-truss bridge. In 2001, the bridge was torn down, due to its major superstructure problems, and with the growing area, could no longer handle the traffic flow as a two lane. By late 2002, the through-truss was gone, and a new five lane girder was in place. The bridge now carries two lanes of eastbound traffic, and three lanes westbound. The Turner Bridge marks the beginning of the Turner Diagonal.

The first bridge in the area called the "Turner Bridge" was designed and announced in 1898. The first bridge was a steel bridge with three spans and had an estimated cost of $60,000 to build.

There is as boat ramp located at the bridge site. The ramp is located at river mile 9.2 of the Kansas River, gps N39.093 W94.711.

Access to the bridge has been closed since 2022 due to detours around work on the K-32/Turner Diagonal/Kaw Drive interchange. The project was originally scheduled for completion in 2024, but as of February 2026, the project is now expected to be complete in May 2026.
