= K107 =

K107 or K-107 may refer to:

- K-107 (Kansas highway), a former state highway in Kansas
- Piano Concertos K. 107 (Mozart)
