= Southwest Boulevard (Kansas City) =

Coordinates: 39°5′17.29″N 94°35′18.33″W

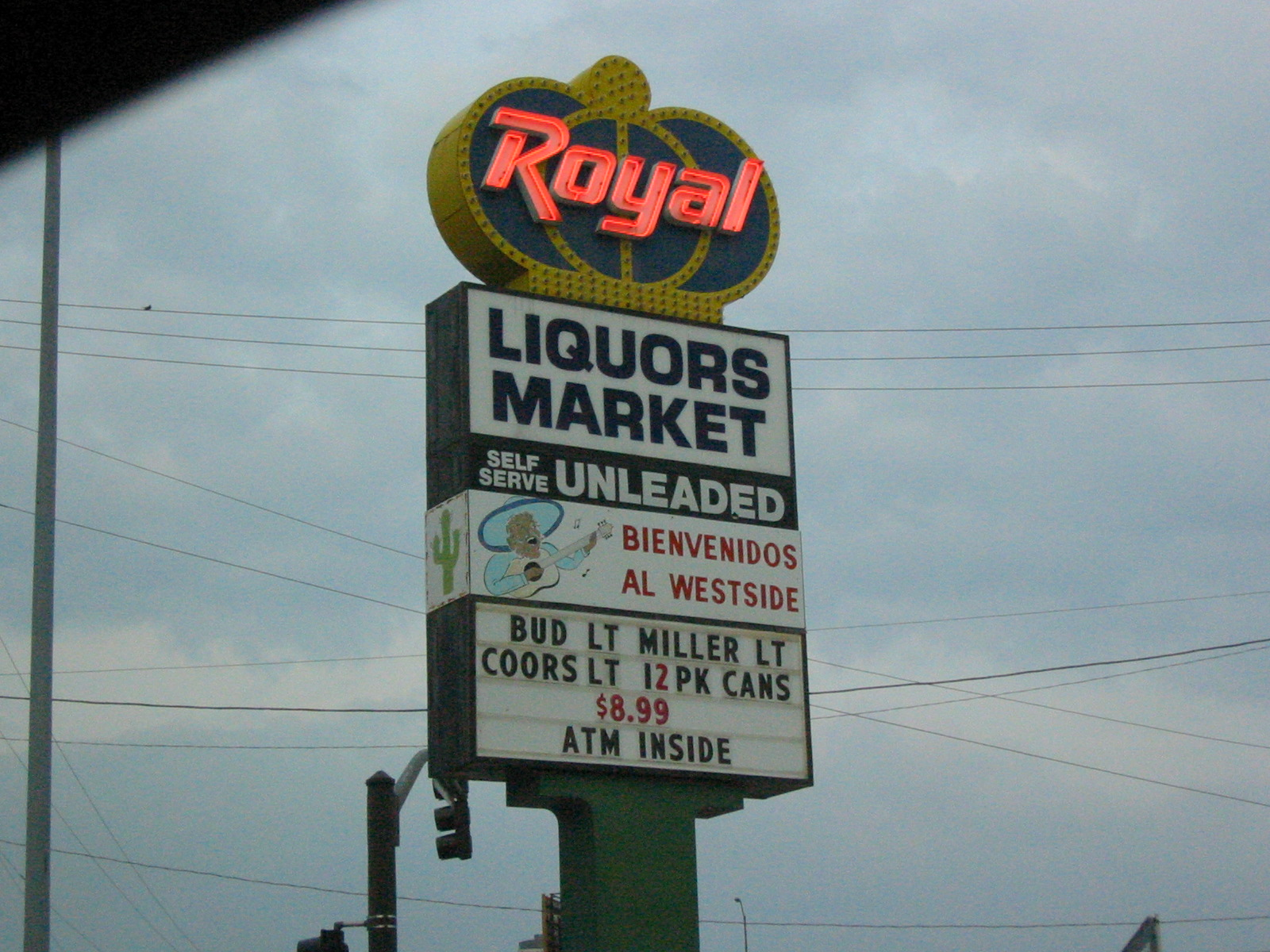
A road sign along Southwest Boulevard at intersection with Summit Street.

Southwest Boulevard (simply known as "The Boulevard" locally) is an arterial street in Kansas City, MO and Kansas City, KS.

== Description ==
On the north end Southwest Boulevard starts as 19th Street at Baltimore Avenue in Kansas City, MO, and travels southwest crossing the state line into Kansas City, KS at 31st Street and continues until crossing 39th Avenue at which point it continues as Merriam Lane. Southwest Boulevard passes through the Crossroads Arts District and the West Side Neighborhood in Missouri and also the Rosedale Neighborhood in Kansas. Throughout the Kansas City area, the Boulevard is known for its wide selection of authentic Mexican restaurants and grocery stores. It is the home of the Boulevard Brewing Company which was founded in 1989 and is now one of the largest craft breweries in the USA, with a capacity of over 600,000 barrels per year.

== History ==
Southwest Boulevard originated as two roads, one being the main street of Rosedale, Kansas, when it was platted in 1872 as "Kansas City Avenue", and the second called "The Rosedale Road", or "Kansas City Boulevard", on the Missouri side. Two property owners provided land to link the two roads in 1887, and the entire road was later renamed as "Southwest Boulevard." One of those landowners was Simeon Bell, who later donated the land upon which Eleanor Taylor Bell Hospital was built on Southwest Boulevard, and which housed the University of Kansas medical school until the 1920s. The Rosedale-Kansas portion of the road was originally macadamized, and was paved in 1915.

The Boulevard twice faced devastation during the 1950s, first by water during the Great Flood of 1951, and then by fire, in 1959, when an oil tanker explosion killed six people and caused widespread property damage.

Part of the road used to be signed as U.S. 69 until the 18th Street Expressway was completed in the 1950s.

== Major intersections ==
State	County	Location	mi	km	Destinations	Notes
Kansas	Wyandotte	Kansas City	0.000	0.000	10th Street / McDowell Lane	Western terminus
Kansas	Wyandotte	Kansas City			Mission Road	Interchange
Kansas	Wyandotte	Kansas City			I-35	I-35 exit 233
Kansas	Wyandotte	Kansas City			US-169	
Missouri	Jackson	Kansas City			22nd Street / Avenida Cesar E Chavez to Kansas Avenue to K-32 west	22nd Street Concurrency overlap
Missouri	Jackson	Kansas City			To I-35 south / W. Pennway	I-35 exit 1C
Missouri	Jackson	Kansas City			20th Street to McGee Street / McGee Street to 22nd Street	22nd Street Concurrency overlap
Missouri	Jackson	Kansas City			Baltimore Avenue / 19th Street	Eastern terminus; road continues as 19th St.
1.000 mi = 1.609 km; 1.000 km = 0.621 mi

== See also ==
- 39th Street (Kansas City)
- Linwood Boulevard (Kansas City)
- Prospect Avenue (Kansas City, Missouri)
- The Paseo (Kansas City)
