= K208 =

K208 or K-208 may refer to:

- K-208 (Kansas highway), a former state highway in Kansas
- Symphony, K. 208+102 (Mozart)

== See also ==
- Il re pastore
