= Morrowville, Kansas =

City in Washington County, Kansas

- City
- Location within Washington County and Kansas

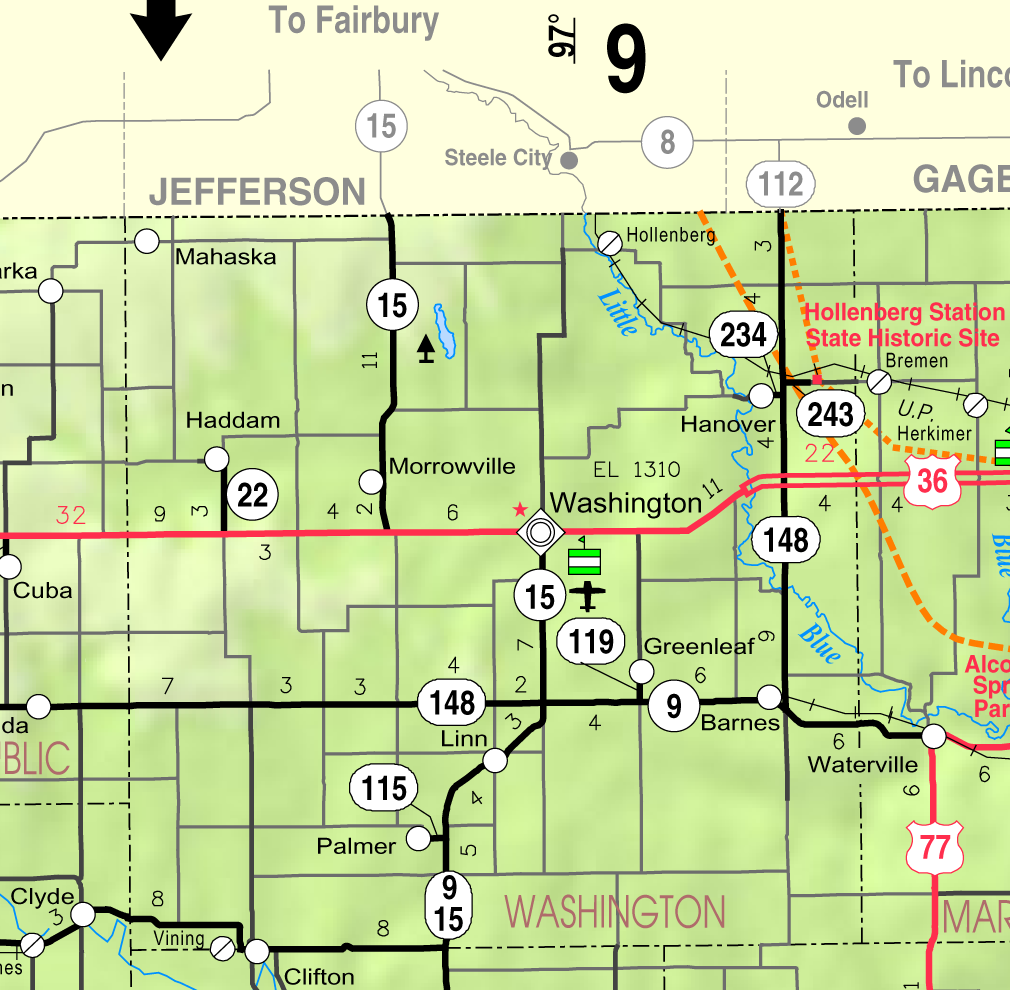
- KDOT map of Washington County (legend)
- Coordinates: 39°50′43″N 97°10′22″W
- Country: United States
- State: Kansas
- County: Washington
- Founded: 1884
- Incorporated: 1929
- Named for: James Morrow

Area
  - Total: 0.14 sq mi (0.37 km^{2})
  - Land: 0.14 sq mi (0.37 km^{2})
  - Water: 0 sq mi (0.00 km^{2})
- Elevation: 1,352 ft (412 m)

Population (2020)
  - Total: 114
  - Density: 800/sq mi (310/km^{2})
- Time zone: UTC-6 (CST)
  - Summer (DST): UTC-5 (CDT)
- ZIP Code: 66958
- Area code: 785
- FIPS code: 20-48450
- GNIS ID: 2395413

Morrowville is a city in Washington County, Kansas, United States. As of the 2020 census, the population of the city was 114.

== History ==
Morrowville was laid out and platted in 1884 when it was certain that the Missouri and Burlington Railroad would be extended to that point. It was named for its founder, James C. Morrow.

The first post office in Morrowville was established in 1884, but the post office was called Morrow Station until 1894.

== Geography ==
According to the United States Census Bureau, the city has a total area of 0.14 square miles (0.36 km^{2}), all land.

== Area attractions ==
- World's First Bulldozer. In 1923, a young farmer named James D Cummings and a draftsman named John Earl McLeod made the designs for a bulldozer. A replica is on display at the city park, where the two built their first bulldozer.

== Demographics ==
Historical population
| Census | Pop. | Note | %± |
|---|---|---|---|
| 1930 | 246 | | — |
| 1940 | 308 | | 25.2% |
| 1950 | 229 | | −25.6% |
| 1960 | 195 | | −14.8% |
| 1970 | 201 | | 3.1% |
| 1980 | 180 | | −10.4% |
| 1990 | 173 | | −3.9% |
| 2000 | 168 | | −2.9% |
| 2010 | 155 | | −7.7% |
| 2020 | 114 | | −26.5% |
U.S. Decennial Census

=== 2020 census ===
The 2020 United States census counted 114 people, 59 households, and 38 families in Morrowville. The population density was 797.2 per square mile (307.8/km^{2}). There were 70 housing units at an average density of 489.5 per square mile (189.0/km^{2}). The racial makeup was 99.12% (113) white or European American (98.25% non-Hispanic white), 0.0% (0) black or African-American, 0.0% (0) Native American or Alaska Native, 0.0% (0) Asian, 0.0% (0) Pacific Islander or Native Hawaiian, 0.0% (0) from other races, and 0.88% (1) from two or more races. Hispanic or Latino of any race was 0.88% (1) of the population.

Of the 59 households, 15.3% had children under the age of 18; 54.2% were married couples living together; 16.9% had a female householder with no spouse or partner present. 30.5% of households consisted of individuals and 13.6% had someone living alone who was 65 years of age or older. The average household size was 2.3 and the average family size was 2.7. The percent of those with a bachelor's degree or higher was estimated to be 14.9% of the population.

15.8% of the population was under the age of 18, 7.9% from 18 to 24, 16.7% from 25 to 44, 39.5% from 45 to 64, and 20.2% who were 65 years of age or older. The median age was 50.4 years. For every 100 females, there were 86.9 males. For every 100 females ages 18 and older, there were 81.1 males.

The 2016–2020 5-year American Community Survey estimates show that the median household income was $55,750 (with a margin of error of +/- $18,549) and the median family income was $63,125 (+/- $2,431). Males had a median income of $34,583 (+/- $5,292) versus $26,250 (+/- $6,940) for females. The median income for those above 16 years old was $29,821 (+/- $2,743). Approximately, 0.0% of families and 1.4% of the population were below the poverty line, including 0.0% of those under the age of 18 and 0.0% of those ages 65 or over.

=== 2010 census ===
As of the census of 2010, there were 155 people, 60 households, and 42 families residing in the city. The population density was 1,107.1 inhabitants per square mile (427.5/km^{2}). There were 90 housing units at an average density of 642.9 per square mile (248.2/km^{2}). The racial makeup of the city was 98.7% White and 1.3% from two or more races.

There were 60 households, of which 38.3% had children under the age of 18 living with them, 65.0% were married couples living together, 1.7% had a female householder with no husband present, 3.3% had a male householder with no wife present, and 30.0% were non-families. 26.7% of all households were made up of individuals, and 13.3% had someone living alone who was 65 years of age or older. The average household size was 2.58 and the average family size was 3.05.

The median age in the city was 40.4 years. 28.4% of residents were under the age of 18; 5.2% were between the ages of 18 and 24; 23.2% were from 25 to 44; 24.5% were from 45 to 64; and 18.7% were 65 years of age or older. The gender makeup of the city was 52.3% male and 47.7% female.

=== 2000 census ===
As of the census of 2000, there were 168 people, 73 households, and 44 families residing in the city. The population density was 1,187.4 inhabitants per square mile (458.5/km^{2}). There were 93 housing units at an average density of 657.3 per square mile (253.8/km^{2}). The racial makeup of the city was 98.21% White, 1.19% Native American, and 0.60% from two or more races. Hispanic or Latino of any race were 0.60% of the population.

There were 73 households, out of which 27.4% had children under the age of 18 living with them, 54.8% were married couples living together, 2.7% had a female householder with no husband present, and 38.4% were non-families. 38.4% of all households were made up of individuals, and 26.0% had someone living alone who was 65 years of age or older. The average household size was 2.30 and the average family size was 3.09.

In the city, the population was spread out, with 28.0% under the age of 18, 1.8% from 18 to 24, 25.0% from 25 to 44, 17.3% from 45 to 64, and 28.0% who were 65 years of age or older. The median age was 40 years. For every 100 females, there were 90.9 males. For every 100 females age 18 and over, there were 95.2 males.

The median income for a household in the city was $26,786, and the median income for a family was $32,500. Males had a median income of $22,813 versus $16,250 for females. The per capita income for the city was $12,133. About 4.8% of families and 9.1% of the population were below the poverty line, including 15.9% of those under the age of eighteen and 7.4% of those 65 or over.

== Education ==
The community is served by Washington County USD 108 public school district, which formed in 2006 by the consolidation of North Central USD 221 and Washington USD 222. The Washington County High School mascot is Tigers.

School unification consolidated Morrowville and Haddam schools into USD #221 schools in 1967. The high school was in Morrowville. The grade school in Haddam. The district was USD #221 and was called North Central. In the mid 1970s Mahaska grade school also joined USD 221.

The North Central High School mascot was the North Central Cougars.
