= K-12 (Kansas highway) =

Former state highway in Kansas, United States

K-12
- Former K-12 in red, former K-12 Spur in blue

Route information
- Maintained by KDOT
- Existed: 1985–1987

Major junctions
- West end: K-7 near Bonner Springs
- I-435 near Lenexa; I-635 in Mission; US-69 in Roeland Park; US-169 in Kansas City
- East end: Missouri state line in Kansas City

Location
- Country: United States
- State: Kansas

Highway system
- Kansas State Highway System; Interstate; US; State; Spurs
← K-10	→ K-13

K-12 was a state highway in the U.S. state of Kansas, created in the mid-1980s. Its alignment was changed during its existence.

== History ==
K-12 was commissioned when the first section of the K-10 freeway was completed from K-7 in Olathe, Kansas to I-435 in Lenexa, Kansas. K-10, at the time, overlapped K-7 from K-12's western terminus in Olathe north to Shawnee Mission Parkway.

When the K-10 freeway segment from Lawrence to Olathe was completed, K-10 was signed for the entire length (both sections) of the expressway. At this time, K-12 was realigned north to replace the former K-10 alignment along the Shawnee Mission Parkway. It followed the parkway from K-7 in Shawnee, then turned north on Merriam Drive in Merriam, which follows into Kansas City, Kansas. Merriam Lane turns into Southwest Boulevard near US-169, and K-12 ended not far east at the Missouri state line.

Since K-12 existed entirely within the city limits of the cities it traverses, it was turned back to the cities in 1987 according to KDOT policy.

== Junction list ==
Major junctions as listed shortly before K-12 was decommissioned in 1987.

County	Location	mi	km	Destinations	Notes
Johnson	Shawnee	0.000	0.000	K-7	Interchange; western terminus
Johnson	Shawnee			I-435	I-435 exits 6A-B
Johnson	Shawnee			Lackman Road	Interchange
Johnson	Overland Park			I-635	I-635 exit 1B
Wyandotte	Kansas City			US-69	
Wyandotte	Kansas City			K-12 Spur to I-35	Western terminus of K-12 Spur; to I-35 exit 233A
Wyandotte	Kansas City			US-169	
Wyandotte	Kansas City			Southwest Boulevard northeast	Continuation into Missouri
1.000 mi = 1.609 km; 1.000 km = 0.621 mi

== Spur route ==
K-12 Spur
- Length: .376 mi (605 m)
- Existed: 1984–1987

K-12 Spur was a .376-mile-long (0.605 km) spur route that ran from K-12 east to Interstate 35 (I-35). Originally K-10 Spur, it was changed to K-12 Spur when the Shawnee Mission Parkway and Merriam Lane were changed from K-10 to K-12. K-12 Spur was withdrawn in 1987 along with K-12 itself.
