= Washington County Schools =

Washington County Schools could refer to:

- Washington County USD 108 in Kansas
- Washington County Schools (Kentucky)
- Washington County Public Schools in Maryland
- Washington County Schools (North Carolina)
- Washington County Schools (Tennessee)
