= K-204 (Kansas highway) =

State highway in Kansas, U.S.

K-204
- K-204 highlighted in red

Route information
- Maintained by KDOT and the city of Smith Center
- Length: 2.116 mi (3.405 km)
- Existed: August 13, 1958–present

Major junctions
- West end: US-36 west of Smith Center
- East end: US-281 in Smith Center

Location
- Country: United States
- State: Kansas
- Counties: Smith

Highway system
- Kansas State Highway System; Interstate; US; State; Spurs
← K-203	→ K-205

K-204 is a short 2.116-mile-long (3.405 km) east–west state highway in the north-central part of the U.S. state of Kansas. K-204's western terminus is at U.S. Route 36 (US-36) west of the city of Smith Center. The eastern terminus is at US-281 in Smith Center. K-57 is a two-lane highway its entire length.

K-204 closely follows a section of the former Pikes Peak Ocean to Ocean Highway. The Kansas State Highway Commission, now known as the Kansas Department of Transportation, first designated K-204 as a state highway on August 13, 1958. The highway replaced a former alignment of US-36 that was decommissioned in 1952.

== Route description ==
K-204's western terminus is at an intersection with U.S. Route 36 (US-36) west of Smith Center. The highway proceeds east to an intersection with O Road. The roadway then turns slightly northeast and begins to parallel a Kyle Railroad track. K-204 continues along the railroad for a short distance before curving north and entering Smith Center. Just inside the city, the highway curves east and becomes New York Street. It continues a short distance through the city before reaching its eastern terminus at US-281, also known as Main Street.

The Kansas Department of Transportation (KDOT) tracks the traffic levels on its highways. On K-204 in 2020, they determined that on average the traffic was 350 vehicles per day near the western terminus. All but 0.588 miles (0.946 km) of K-204 is maintained by KDOT. The section within Smith Center is maintained by the city. K-204 connects to the National Highway System at each terminus.

== History ==
=== Early roads ===
Before state highways were numbered in Kansas there were auto trails, which were an informal network of marked routes that existed in the United States and Canada in the early part of the 20th century. K-204's alignment closely follows the Pikes Peak Ocean to Ocean Highway, which was formed early in 1912, and travelled from New York City to Los Angeles. The eastern terminus (US-281) was part of the Sunflower Trail.

=== Establishment and realignments ===
In a resolution passed on October 10, 1951, it was approved to build a new alignment of US-36 from Smith Center westward. At the end of December 1951, the Kansas State Highway Commission (SHC), now known as KDOT, asked for bids to build a new alignment of US-36 from Smith Center west for 8.4 miles (13.5 km). The new roadway would be 42-foot-wide (13 m), have six bridges and sixteen box culverts. By mid-1952, work was progressing on the new section, which was expected to be completed by fall that year.

In a resolution approved by the SHC on August 13, 1958, K-204 was established as a state highway along the former alignment of US-36. The highway first appears on the 1962 state highway map. The highway's alignment has not changed since it was established.

== Major intersections ==
The entire route is in Smith County.

Location	mi	km	Destinations	Notes
Center Township	0.000	0.000	US-36 – Kensington, Smith Center	Western terminus
Smith Center	2.116	3.405	US-281 (Main Street)	Eastern terminus
1.000 mi = 1.609 km; 1.000 km = 0.621 mi
