= K-108 (Kansas highway) =

State highway

K-108
- K-108 highlighted in red

Route information
- Maintained by KDOT
- Length: 1.500 mi (2.414 km)
- Existed: August 28, 1946–July 19, 2004

Major junctions
- South end: US-59 in Erie
- North end: US-59 in Erie

Location
- Country: United States
- State: Kansas
- Counties: Neosho

Highway system
- Kansas State Highway System; Interstate; US; State; Spurs
← K-107	→ K-110

K-108 was a 1.500-mile-long (2.414 km) north–south state highway in the U.S. state of Kansas. Both of K-108's termini were at U.S. Route 59 (US-59) on the west edge of Erie.

Before highways were numbered in Kansas there were auto trails. A portion of K-108 followed the former King of Trails. In 1946, a new alignment of US-59 was approved to the west of Erie, as well as K-108, which would connect Erie to the new alignment. The new alignment of US-59 and K-108 were completed in 1960. That same year, K-108 was extended east, then north, then west to US-59. This created a complete loop through Erie off US-59. K-108 was removed from the state highway system in a resolution approved in 2004.

== Route description ==
K-108's southern terminus was at US-59 at the west edge of Erie. The roadway began travelling east along West 4th Street. After about 0.5 miles (0.80 km), K-108 reached Main Street, where it turned north. The highway continued north through the city to State Street, where it turned west. It continued along State Street for 0.5 miles (0.80 km) before reaching its northern terminus back at US-59 at the west edge of Erie.

The Kansas Department of Transportation (KDOT) tracks the traffic levels on its highways. On K-108 in 2003, they determined that, on average, the traffic varied from 1,490 vehicles per day near the southern terminus to 2,320 vehicles per day near the northern terminus. K-108 was not included in the National Highway System.

== History ==
Prior to the formation of the Kansas state highway system, there were auto trails, which were an informal network of marked routes that existed in the United States and Canada in the early part of the 20th century. A portion of K-108 followed the former King of Trails.

US-59 originally ran directly north–south through Erie. In a resolution on August 28, 1946, a new alignment of US-59 was approved to be built to the west of Erie, as well as a highway to link Erie to the new alignment that would be designated as K-108. It was not until early December 1957 that the Kansas State Highway Commission approved a bid for the new alignment of US-59. In March 1959, a $111,141 (equivalent to $1.2 million in 2024) project was approved to pave the new US-59 as well as a $5,403 (equivalent to $58,280 in 2024) project to pave K-108. The new bypass was completed and opened to traffic in July 1960.

In a resolution approved on November 10, 1960, K-108 was extended east, then north, then west to US-59 and K-57. This created a complete loop through Erie off US-59. In December 1978, the Erie city council voted to let the state continue to maintain the highway through the city. The city had the option of taking over control. KDOT removed K-108 from the state highway system in a resolution approved on July 19, 2004. This was done because Erie annexed the remaining land surrounding K-108, resulting in the highway entirely running through city limits.

== Major intersections ==
The entire route was in Erie, Neosho County.

mi	km	Destinations	Notes
0.000	0.000	US-59 (Pratt Road)	Southern terminus
1.500	2.414	US-59 (Pratt Road)	Northern terminus
1.000 mi = 1.609 km; 1.000 km = 0.621 mi
