= Turner Diagonal =

Freeway in Kansas City, Kansas, US

Turner Diagonal
- Turner Diagonal highlighted in red

Route information
- Maintained by WyCo Unified Government
- Length: 3 mi (4.8 km)

Major junctions
- West end: State Avenue in Kansas City, KS
- East end: K-32 / Kansas Ave. in Kansas City, KS

Location
- Country: United States
- State: Kansas
- Counties: Wyandotte

Highway system
- Kansas State Highway System; Interstate; US; State; Spurs

The Turner Diagonal (map) is a short freeway in Kansas City, Kansas. It runs from Kansas Avenue northwest to State Avenue. It does not have a single numbered designation, though the entire route was formerly signed as US 40 west of I-70, K-132 east of I-70 and is currently signed as K-32 from Kansas Avenue to its first interchange.

It is named "Turner Diagonal" because it runs diagonally and because it runs into and out of the Turner neighborhood in Kansas City. It provides a convenient shortcut to I-635, bypassing the stoplights on State Avenue and Parallel Parkway. The speed limit is 55 miles per hour (89 km/h) for the entire length of the freeway. The freeway was formerly known as K-132.

Since 2020, due to low traffic use, some interchanges of the Turner Diagonal have been downgraded to at-grade junctions.

== K-132 ==
K-132 was a highway commissioned in the 1960s to connect Kansas City, KS to its Turner and Argentine neighborhoods. Its western terminus was originally at K-32, but was extended to terminate at I-70 in the late 1970s when the U.S. Route 40 alignment shifted to overlap I-70 after leaving the Turner Diagonal. Its eastern terminus at U.S. Route 69 (18th Street Expressway) in industrial Kansas City, KS.

It was turned back to the city of Kansas City in 1993, since all of the highway lay within the city limits. It was resigned as a realignment of K-32 east of Kaw Drive to US-69, while the controlled access portion west of Kaw Drive to I-70 remains unsigned. The state still maintains the roadway by repainting/replacing old exit signs; it has not maintained nor resurfaced this old segment of K-132 since 1993.

It is now simply known as "Turner Diagonal". The 0.25-mile (0.40 km) portion of this expressway from I-70 west to US-24 was signed as US-40 until 2009. US-40 used to leave its concurrency with US-24, head east on the Turner Diagonal before overlapping I-70.

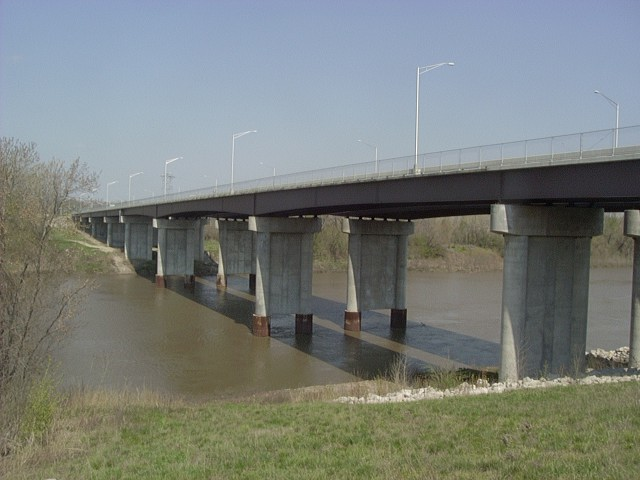
This image is from the access road on the south side of the Turner Diagonal bridge near the Kaw river looking westward. (April 2007)

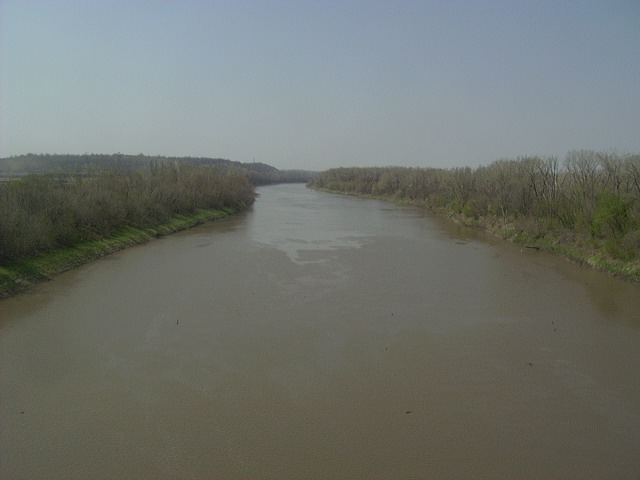
Kaw River (map) from looking southward from middle of Turner Diagonal bridge. (April 2007)

== Exit list ==
The entire route is in Kansas City, Wyandotte County. All exits are unnumbered.

mi	km	Destinations	Notes
0.0	0.0	State Avenue	Western terminus; road continues north as College Parkway
0.6– 0.7	0.97– 1.1	I-70 / US-24 / US-40 / Kansas Turnpike – St. Louis, Topeka	Diverging Diamond Interchange
1.1	1.8	Riverview Avenue	At-grade intersection
1.6	2.6	65th Street	Interchange
2.1	3.4	K-32 west (Kaw Drive west)	Interchange; Westbound exit and eastbound entrance; west end of K-32 concurrency
2.1	3.4	Kaw Drive east	Interchange
2.5	4.0	59th Street Lane	at-grade intersection
3.2	5.1	K-32 east (Kansas Avenue)	Eastern terminus; east end of K-32 concurrency; road continues east as K-32 (Kansas Avenue)
1.000 mi = 1.609 km; 1.000 km = 0.621 mi: Concurrency terminus
