= Woolbert's Stockade Hotel =

- Washington, Kansas.

Site information
- Type: fortified structure used as a community place of refuge
- Controlled by: E. Woolbert, Sr.

Location
- Coordinates: 39°48′58″N 97°03′04″W

Site history
- Built: September 1860
- In use: 1860 to ca. 1865
- Materials: wood

Garrison information
- Past commanders: E. Woolbert, Sr.

In spring 1860 the Washington Town Company laid out the town site of Washington, Kansas. A log cabin was built as the headquarters of the town company and this became known as the Washington Company House. The logs of this building were set up perpendicular, so the outside of the building resembled a stockade. One of its uses was to serve as a place of refuge when problems arose with area Indians opposed to white settlement of the area.

E. Woolbert, Sr., one of the founders of Washington, constructed a second stockade building, Woolbert's Stockade Hotel, in September 1860. It was also to be used as a place of refuge during hostilities with some area Indians. This building was Washington's first hotel and it served as the town's post office. It had walls built in stockade fashion that were six inches thick.

If these two buildings were used, it would have occurred in 1864 or 1865. In the summer of 1864 the area between Washington and Clay Center, Kansas, was abandoned by settlers who took refuge in a stockade made of encircled wagons in Clay Center. At that time, Indians hostile to settlers were active in the area. Washington was not abandoned during this disturbance. The residents of Washington County and two other counties requested aid from the military, but no troops were sent. Instead, some guns and ammunition were provided by the military.

The use of the Stockade Hotel may have ceased when Woolbert sold the building in 1865. It also ceased at that time to be the town post office. In 1868 the building was sold to the county for use as the Washington County Courthouse. It was then called the Old Stockade Courthouse. Its tenure as the courthouse was short lived. On March 31, 1870, the building and all the county records burned. The origin of the fire was suspicious and the outgoing county treasurer was charged with embezzlement and arson. He was acquitted of the charges and the origin of the fire remained unknown.
