= K-87 (Kansas highway) =

State highway in Kansas, U.S.

K-87
- 26th Road
- K-87 highlighted in red

Route information
- Maintained by KDOT
- Length: 8.625 mi (13.881 km)
- Existed: October 1932–present

Major junctions
- South end: 26th Road in Vliets
- K-9 north of Vliets
- North end: US-36 west of Baileyville

Location
- Country: United States
- State: Kansas
- Counties: Marshall

Highway system
- Kansas State Highway System; Interstate; US; State; Spurs
← K-86	→ K-88

K-87 is a 8.625-mile-long (13.881 km) north–south state highway in the U.S. state of Kansas. The highway runs from the end of state maintenance, where it continues as 26th Road, in the community of Vliets north to U.S. Route 36 (US 36) west of the community of Baileyville. The highway travels through farmland and is a two-lane highway its entire length.

K-87 was first established in October 1932, as a short spur connecting Vliets to K-9. On July 9, 1947, the highway was approved to be extended north to US-36. The entire length of the highway was paved by 1958. Since it was extended north, its alignment has not changed.

== Route description ==
K-87's southern terminus is at the unincorporated community of Vliets as a continuation of 26th Road. The highway travels north through flat rural farmland and soon crosses the Black Vermillion River. The roadway soon reaches a junction with K-9, also known as Sunflower Road. K-87 continues north through rural farmland for roughly five miles (8.0 km) to an intersection with Navajo Road by the Salem Church. The highway advances north through more farmland to its northern terminus at US-36, also known as the Pony Express Highway, west of Baileyville. Past US-36, the road continues north as 26th Road.

The Kansas Department of Transportation (KDOT) tracks the traffic levels on its highways, and in 2017, they determined that on average the traffic varied from 205 vehicles per day slightly north of K-9 to 240 vehicles per day between the southern terminus and K-9. K-87 connects to the National Highway System at its northern terminus at US-36. (Note: The National Highway System is a system of highways important to the nation's defense, economy, and mobility.)

== History ==
Prior to the formation of the Kansas state highway system, there were auto trails, which were an informal network of marked routes that existed in the United States and Canada in the early part of the 20th century. K-9 follows the former Kansas White Way. The northern terminus closely follows the former Pikes Peak Ocean to Ocean Highway, which was formed early in 1912, and travelled from New York City to Los Angeles.

In October 1932, the Kansas State Highway Commission (SHC) announced that it had allocated $1,991.94 (equivalent to $37,177 in 2024 dollars) to build a 0.5-mile-long (0.80 km) spur from Vliets north to K-9. The grading of the new highway was done under supervision of the county commissioners with county labor. The SHC agreed to give the road a gravel surface within three months of completion. The continuation of the state road from K-9 north to US-36 had a gravel surface added in late 1934, making it an all-weather road. In early October 1935, the SHC asked for bids to add a sand/gravel or keystone surface to K-87. The next month, the SHC approved a bid of $4,445 (equivalent to $79,794 in 2024 dollars) to add a gravel surface to K-87. In a resolution approved on September 11, 1946, the K-87 was to extend north to US-36 as soon as Marshall County had brought the road up to state highway standards. By mid-1947, the county had finished necessary projects and in a resolution approved on July 9, 1947, it was added to the state highway system.

In August 1951, the entire length of the highway was re-gravelled at a cost of $4,556.30 (equivalent to $44,010 in 2024 dollars). In early February 1958, the SHC asked for bids to be received to pave the entire length of K-87. On March 12, 1958, the SHC approved a bid of $9,469 (equivalent to $78,739 in 2024 dollars) for the paving job. Over the years, the Black Vermillion River has flooded the highway numerous times, including 17 times in 1973 alone. In December 1978, KDOT initiated land condemnation proceedings to obtain 1.88 acres (7,600 m^{2}) of land for building of a new bridge over the river. Included in the easement were plans to change the course of the river as well as raise the elevation of the bridge. In mid-January 1979, KDOT began taking in bids to build the new bridge and 0.5 miles (0.80 km) of grading on each end of the bridge. The bridge was replaced by the end of the year.

== Major intersections ==
The entire route is in Marshall County.

Location	mi	km	Destinations	Notes
Vliets	0.000	0.000	26th Road	Southern terminus; continues south as 26th Road
Noble Township	0.590	0.950	K-9 (Sunflower Road) – Frankfort, Centralia	
Murray Township	8.625	13.881	US-36 (Pony Express Highway) – Marysville, Seneca	Northern terminus
1.000 mi = 1.609 km; 1.000 km = 0.621 mi
