= Washington Company House =

Former building in Kansas, U.S.

Coordinates: 39.8180°N 97.0506°W

- Washington, Kansas

Site information
- Type: local militia post
- Controlled by: local militia

Site history
- Built: 1860
- In use: 1860 to ca. 1865
- Materials: wood

Garrison information
- Garrison: same

In spring 1860 the Washington Town Company laid out the town site of Washington, Kansas. A log cabin was built as the headquarters of the town company and this became known as the Washington Company House. It probably stood on the site of the current Washington County Courthouse. The logs of this building were set up perpendicular, so the outside of the building resembled a stockade.

The Company House was to have various uses. It was to serve as the meeting place for the Washington County, Kansas, county commission. It also served as a public school and as a church. It was also to be a place of protection in case Indians hostile to white settlement decided to attack settlers in the area. Woolbert's Stockade Hotel, constructed in September 1860, was a second building in Washington to be used for protection during hostilities with some area Indians.

If these two buildings were used, it would have occurred in 1864 or 1865. In the summer of 1864 the area between Washington and Clay Center, Kansas, was abandoned by settlers who took refuge in a stockade made of encircled wagons in Clay Center. At that time, Indians hostile to settlers were active in the area.

Washington was not abandoned during this disturbance. The residents of Washington County and two other counties requested aid from the military, but no troops were sent. Instead, some guns and ammunition were provided by the military.

After all worries concerning Indians ceased, possibly in the late 1860s, the Washington Company House was no longer used as a place of protection. The fate of this building is unknown, but a photo of it from many years later shows it was not demolished for some time.
