= Washington, Kansas =

City in Washington County, Kansas

- City and County seat
- Location within Washington County and Kansas

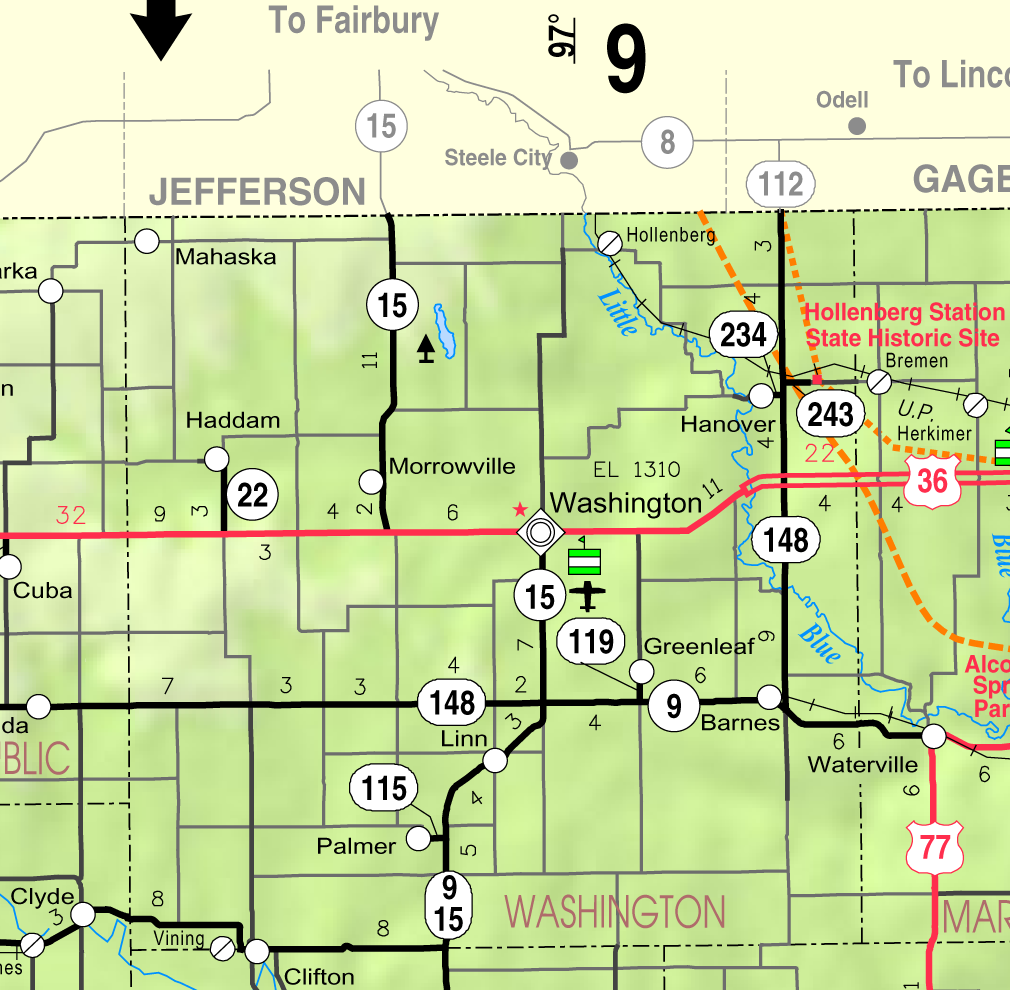
- KDOT map of Washington County (legend)
- Coordinates: 39°48′58″N 97°02′55″W
- Country: United States
- State: Kansas
- County: Washington
- Founded: 1860
- Incorporated: 1875
- Named for: George Washington

Area
  - Total: 1.01 sq mi (2.62 km^{2})
  - Land: 0.97 sq mi (2.52 km^{2})
  - Water: 0.039 sq mi (0.10 km^{2})
- Elevation: 1,319 ft (402 m)

Population (2020)
  - Total: 1,071
  - Density: 1,100/sq mi (425/km^{2})
- Time zone: UTC-6 (CST)
  - Summer (DST): UTC-5 (CDT)
- ZIP Code: 66968
- Area code: 785
- FIPS code: 20-75825
- GNIS ID: 485656
- Website: washingtonks.net

Washington is a city in and the county seat of Washington County, Kansas, United States. As of the 2020 census, the population of the city was 1,071.

== History ==
Washington was established in spring 1860, and in the same year was named the county seat. Until the end of the Civil War, it was protected by two stockaded buildings, the Washington Company House and Woolbert's Stockade Hotel.

The first post office in Washington was established in November 1861.

== Geography ==
According to the United States Census Bureau, the city has a total area of 0.91 square miles (2.36 km^{2}), of which 0.87 square miles (2.25 km^{2}) is land and 0.04 square miles (0.10 km^{2}) is water.

=== Climate ===
According to the Köppen Climate Classification system, Washington has a humid subtropical climate, abbreviated "Cfa" on climate maps. The hottest temperature recorded in Washington was 112 °F (44.4 °C) on July 12, 1954, while the coldest temperature recorded was −29 °F (−33.9 °C) on December 23, 1989 and February 16, 2021.

Climate data for Washington, Kansas, 1991–2020 normals, extremes 1893–present
Month	Jan	Feb	Mar	Apr	May	Jun	Jul	Aug	Sep	Oct	Nov	Dec	Year
Record high °F (°C)	75 (24)	85 (29)	90 (32)	98 (37)	103 (39)	107 (42)	112 (44)	110 (43)	107 (42)	97 (36)	84 (29)	73 (23)	112 (44)
Mean maximum °F (°C)	60.8 (16.0)	67.3 (19.6)	78.9 (26.1)	86.2 (30.1)	91.9 (33.3)	96.8 (36.0)	101.6 (38.7)	100.0 (37.8)	95.2 (35.1)	88.0 (31.1)	73.3 (22.9)	62.6 (17.0)	102.8 (39.3)
Mean daily maximum °F (°C)	37.2 (2.9)	42.6 (5.9)	54.5 (12.5)	64.9 (18.3)	74.9 (23.8)	85.4 (29.7)	90.3 (32.4)	87.9 (31.1)	80.5 (26.9)	67.8 (19.9)	52.5 (11.4)	40.2 (4.6)	64.9 (18.3)
Daily mean °F (°C)	26.1 (−3.3)	30.5 (−0.8)	41.5 (5.3)	52.1 (11.2)	63.3 (17.4)	73.9 (23.3)	78.8 (26.0)	76.0 (24.4)	67.6 (19.8)	54.6 (12.6)	40.4 (4.7)	29.6 (−1.3)	52.9 (11.6)
Mean daily minimum °F (°C)	15.0 (−9.4)	18.4 (−7.6)	28.4 (−2.0)	39.2 (4.0)	51.7 (10.9)	62.4 (16.9)	67.2 (19.6)	64.0 (17.8)	54.7 (12.6)	41.4 (5.2)	28.3 (−2.1)	19.0 (−7.2)	40.8 (4.9)
Mean minimum °F (°C)	−4.4 (−20.2)	0.9 (−17.3)	11.0 (−11.7)	24.6 (−4.1)	36.6 (2.6)	50.1 (10.1)	56.1 (13.4)	53.9 (12.2)	39.5 (4.2)	25.3 (−3.7)	14.1 (−9.9)	1.9 (−16.7)	−8.4 (−22.4)
Record low °F (°C)	−24 (−31)	−29 (−34)	−18 (−28)	5 (−15)	28 (−2)	40 (4)	44 (7)	43 (6)	26 (−3)	13 (−11)	−6 (−21)	−29 (−34)	−29 (−34)
Average precipitation inches (mm)	0.79 (20)	1.14 (29)	1.80 (46)	3.14 (80)	4.44 (113)	4.74 (120)	4.13 (105)	4.26 (108)	3.07 (78)	2.18 (55)	1.49 (38)	1.23 (31)	32.41 (823)
Average snowfall inches (cm)	4.6 (12)	4.6 (12)	1.4 (3.6)	0.3 (0.76)	0.0 (0.0)	0.0 (0.0)	0.0 (0.0)	0.0 (0.0)	0.0 (0.0)	0.1 (0.25)	1.0 (2.5)	2.4 (6.1)	14.4 (37.21)
Average precipitation days (≥ 0.01 in)	4.6	4.7	6.5	8.8	11.0	9.8	8.6	8.2	6.8	6.8	5.3	4.5	85.6
Average snowy days (≥ 0.1 in)	2.9	2.3	1.2	0.3	0.0	0.0	0.0	0.0	0.0	0.2	1.0	2.2	10.1
Source 1: NOAA
Source 2: National Weather Service

== Demographics ==
Historical population
Census	Pop.	Note	%±
1880	675		—
1890	1,613		139.0%
1900	1,575		−2.4%
1910	1,547		−1.8%
1920	1,406		−9.1%
1930	1,370		−2.6%
1940	1,598		16.6%
1950	1,527		−4.4%
1960	1,506		−1.4%
1970	1,584		5.2%
1980	1,488		−6.1%
1990	1,304		−12.4%
2000	1,223		−6.2%
2010	1,131		−7.5%
2020	1,071		−5.3%
U.S. Decennial Census

=== 2010 census ===
As of the census of 2010, there were 1,131 people, 512 households, and 311 families living in the city. The population density was 1,300.0 inhabitants per square mile (501.9/km^{2}). There were 582 housing units at an average density of 669.0 per square mile (258.3/km^{2}). The racial makeup of the city was 97.8% White, 0.3% African American, 0.1% Native American, 0.2% Asian, 0.4% from other races, and 1.2% from two or more races. Hispanic or Latino of any race were 2.3% of the population.

There were 512 households, of which 26.0% had children under the age of 18 living with them, 52.3% were married couples living together, 6.1% had a female householder with no husband present, 2.3% had a male householder with no wife present, and 39.3% were non-families. 36.7% of all households were made up of individuals, and 18.9% had someone living alone who was 65 years of age or older. The average household size was 2.13 and the average family size was 2.76.

The median age in the city was 46.8 years. 21.8% of residents were under the age of 18; 4.7% were between the ages of 18 and 24; 20.9% were from 25 to 44; 26.7% were from 45 to 64; and 25.9% were 65 years of age or older. The gender makeup of the city was 47.1% male and 52.9% female.

=== 2000 census ===
As of the census of 2000, there were 1,223 people, 553 households, and 331 families living in the city. The population density was 1,395.3 inhabitants per square mile (538.7/km^{2}). There were 644 housing units at an average density of 734.7 per square mile (283.7/km^{2}). The racial makeup of the city was 98.94% White, 0.08% African American, 0.25% Native American, 0.25% from other races, and 0.49% from two or more races. Hispanic or Latino of any race were 0.57% of the population.

There were 553 households, out of which 24.1% had children under the age of 18 living with them, 51.9% were married couples living together, 5.2% had a female householder with no husband present, and 40.1% were non-families. 37.1% of all households were made up of individuals, and 19.7% had someone living alone who was 65 years of age or older. The average household size was 2.13 and the average family size was 2.81.

In the city, the population was spread out, with 21.1% under the age of 18, 4.9% from 18 to 24, 23.1% from 25 to 44, 23.0% from 45 to 64, and 28.0% who were 65 years of age or older. The median age was 46 years. For every 100 females, there were 89.0 males. For every 100 females age 18 and over, there were 84.9 males.

The median income for a household in the city was $30,529, and the median income for a family was $37,448. Males had a median income of $27,171 versus $17,938 for females. The per capita income for the city was $15,760. About 8.6% of families and 10.5% of the population were below the poverty line, including 13.1% of those under age 18 and 15.5% of those age 65 or over.

== Education ==
The community is served by Washington County USD 108 public school district, which formed in 2006 by the consolidation of North Central USD 221 and Washington USD 222.

== Notable people ==
- Charlie Becker (1887–1968), actor who portrayed the mayor of Munchkinland in 1939 The Wizard of Oz film
- Bill Pannbacker, former member of the Kansas House of Representatives

== See also ==
- Central Branch Union Pacific Railroad
