= K-207 (Kansas highway) =

Former state highway in Kansas, United States

K-207
- Former K-207 in red, former K-207 Alternate in blue

Route information
- Maintained by KDOT
- Length: 0.600 mi (966 m)
- Existed: September 24, 1958–July 20, 1992

Major junctions
- South end: I-70 / K-18 / K-207 Alt. in Junction City
- North end: US 40 Bus. in Junction City

Location
- Country: United States
- State: Kansas
- Counties: Geary

Highway system
- Kansas State Highway System; Interstate; US; State; Spurs
| ← K-206 | → K-208 |

K-207 was a 0.600-mile-long (0.966 km) state highway in the U.S. state of Kansas. K-207's southern terminus was at Interstate 70 (I-70), K-18 and the eastern terminus of K-207 Alt. in Junction City, and the northern terminus was at US-40 Bus. in Junction City. K-207 is now known as East Street.

K-207 was established in a September 24, 1958 resolution. It remained at the same alignment, until removed K-207 from the state highway system in a July 20, 1992 resolution.

== Route description ==
K-207 began at a diamond interchange with I-70 and K-18, at current exit 298. It then headed north and immediately intersected the eastern terminus of K-207 Alternate. From here it continued north along East Street for a short distance before terminating at US-40 Business (6th Street).

The Kansas Department of Transportation (KDOT) tracks the traffic levels on its highways, and in 1991, they determined that on average the traffic was 625 vehicles between K-107 Alternate and its northern terminus.

== History ==
K-207 was established in a September 24, 1958 resolution. The Kansas Department of Transportation removed K-207 from the state highway system in a July 20, 1992 resolution.

== Major intersections ==
The entire route was in Junction City, Geary County.

| mi | km | Destinations | Notes |
|---|---|---|---|
| 0.000– 0.200 | 0.000– 0.322 | I-70 / K-18 / K-207 Alt. west | Southern terminus; eastern terminus of K-207 Alt.; I-70 exit 298 |
| 0.600 | 0.966 | US 40 Bus. (6th Street) | Northern terminus |
1.000 mi = 1.609 km; 1.000 km = 0.621 mi

== Alternate route ==
K-207 Alternate
- Location: Junction City
- Length: 0.520 mi (837 m)
- Existed: 1959–July 20, 1992

K-207 Alt. was a 0.700-mile-long (1.127 km) state highway in the U.S. state of Kansas. K-207 Alt.'s western terminus was at US-77 Alt. and US-40 Bus. in Junction City and the eastern terminus was at Interstate 70 (I-70), K-18 and the southern terminus of K-207 in Junction City. K-207 Alt. was established in a September 9, 1959 resolution. The Kansas Department of Transportation removed K-207 Alt. from the state highway system in a July 20, 1992 resolution. In 1991, the average daily traffic was 1495 vehicles on K-107 Alternate. It is now known as Chestnut Street.

The entire route was in Junction City, Geary County.

| mi | km | Destinations | Notes |
|---|---|---|---|
| 0.000 | 0.000 | US 40 Bus. / US 77 Alt. (South Washington Street) | Western terminus |
| 0.520 | 0.837 | I-70 / K-18 / K-207 north | Eastern terminus; southern terminus of K-207; I-70 exit 298 |
1.000 mi = 1.609 km; 1.000 km = 0.621 mi
