= K-208 (Kansas highway) =

Former state highway in Kansas, United States

K-208
- Former K-208 highlighted in red

Route information
- Maintained by KDOT
- Length: 0.201 mi (323 m)
- Existed: July 12, 1961–April 21, 1967

Major junctions
- South end: K-4 in Valley Falls
- North end: K-16 in Valley Falls

Location
- Country: United States
- State: Kansas
- Counties: Jefferson

Highway system
- Kansas State Highway System; Interstate; US; State; Spurs
← K-207	→ K-209

K-208 was a 0.201-mile-long (0.323 km) state highway in the U.S. state of Kansas. K-208's southern terminus was at K-4 in Valley Falls and the northern terminus was at K-16 in Valley Falls. K-208 was first designated as a state highway in 1961, from K-4 to K-16. Then in 1967, K-208 was decommissioned and became locally maintained.

== History ==
K-208 was first designated as a state highway on July 12, 1961, to a highway connecting K-4 to K-16. In an April 21, 1967 resolution, K-4 and K-16 were realigned in and around Valley Falls to make way for the new Perry Reservoir. Also at this time K-208 was decommissioned as a state highway.

== Major intersections ==
The entire route was in Valley Falls, Jefferson County.

mi	km	Destinations	Notes
0.000	0.000	K-4	Southern terminus
0.201	0.323	K-16	Northern terminus
1.000 mi = 1.609 km; 1.000 km = 0.621 mi
