= Greenleaf, Kansas =

City in Washington County, Kansas

- City
- Location within Washington County and Kansas

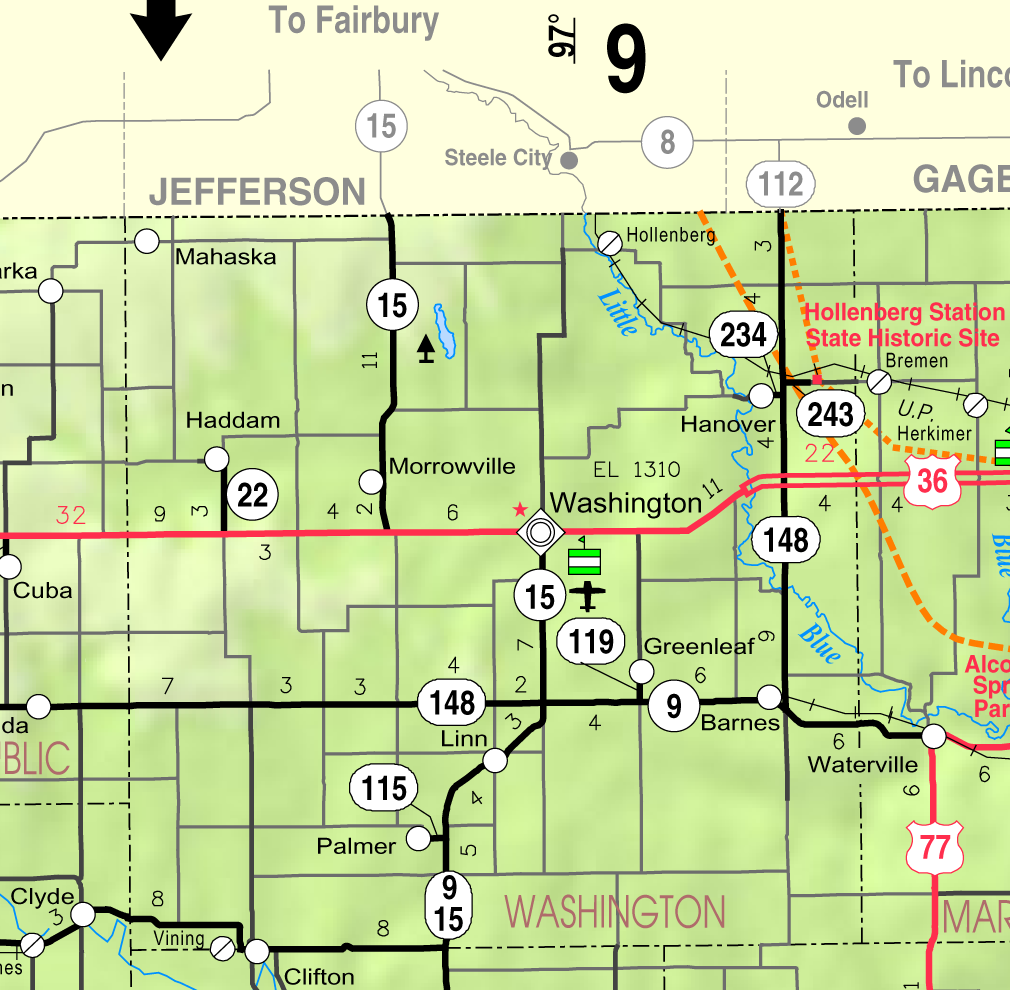
- KDOT map of Washington County (legend)
- Coordinates: 39°43′38″N 96°58′48″W
- Country: United States
- State: Kansas
- County: Washington
- Founded: 1876
- Incorporated: 1880
- Named for: A.W. Greenleaf

Area
  - Total: 0.46 sq mi (1.18 km^{2})
  - Land: 0.45 sq mi (1.17 km^{2})
  - Water: 0 sq mi (0.00 km^{2})
- Elevation: 1,414 ft (431 m)

Population (2020)
  - Total: 350
  - Density: 770/sq mi (300/km^{2})
- Time zone: UTC-6 (CST)
  - Summer (DST): UTC-5 (CDT)
- ZIP Code: 66943
- Area code: 785
- FIPS code: 20-28625
- GNIS ID: 2394991

Greenleaf is a city in Washington County, Kansas, United States. As of the 2020 census, the population of the city was 350.

== History ==
Greenleaf was founded in 1876. It was incorporated in 1880. Greenleaf was named for A. W. Greenleaf, the treasurer of the Central Branch Union Pacific Railroad. The post office at Round Grove, Kansas; which had been known at various times as Prospect Hill and Hopper, was moved to Greenleaf when the railroad missed the settlement.

The Greenleaf school was gutted by fire in 1966.

A tornado hit Greenleaf on September 25, 1973. The tornado demolished 42 homes, 26 businesses and took the lives of two children.

== Geography ==
According to the United States Census Bureau, the city has a total area of 0.46 square miles (1.19 km^{2}), all land.

== Demographics ==
Historical population
| Census | Pop. | Note | %± |
|---|---|---|---|
| 1880 | 316 | | — |
| 1890 | 916 | | 189.9% |
| 1900 | 854 | | −6.8% |
| 1910 | 781 | | −8.5% |
| 1920 | 778 | | −0.4% |
| 1930 | 660 | | −15.2% |
| 1940 | 739 | | 12.0% |
| 1950 | 614 | | −16.9% |
| 1960 | 562 | | −8.5% |
| 1970 | 448 | | −20.3% |
| 1980 | 462 | | 3.1% |
| 1990 | 353 | | −23.6% |
| 2000 | 357 | | 1.1% |
| 2010 | 331 | | −7.3% |
| 2020 | 350 | | 5.7% |
U.S. Decennial Census

=== 2020 census ===
The 2020 United States census counted 350 people, 142 households, and 91 families in Greenleaf. The population density was 774.3 per square mile (299.0/km^{2}). There were 155 housing units at an average density of 342.9 per square mile (132.4/km^{2}). The racial makeup was 82.86% (290) white or European American (82.29% non-Hispanic white), 0.0% (0) black or African-American, 0.0% (0) Native American or Alaska Native, 0.0% (0) Asian, 0.0% (0) Pacific Islander or Native Hawaiian, 6.0% (21) from other races, and 11.14% (39) from two or more races. Hispanic or Latino of any race was 14.29% (50) of the population.

Of the 142 households, 33.1% had children under the age of 18; 50.7% were married couples living together; 26.1% had a female householder with no spouse or partner present. 31.0% of households consisted of individuals and 19.0% had someone living alone who was 65 years of age or older. The average household size was 2.1 and the average family size was 3.2. The percent of those with a bachelor's degree or higher was estimated to be 3.4% of the population.

24.0% of the population was under the age of 18, 6.9% from 18 to 24, 25.1% from 25 to 44, 23.1% from 45 to 64, and 20.9% who were 65 years of age or older. The median age was 40.0 years. For every 100 females, there were 94.4 males. For every 100 females ages 18 and older, there were 107.8 males.

The 2016–2020 5-year American Community Survey estimates show that the median household income was $36,458 (with a margin of error of +/- $11,746) and the median family income was $51,667 (+/- $5,809). Males had a median income of $31,591 (+/- $8,662) versus $16,429 (+/- $4,180) for females. The median income for those above 16 years old was $22,188 (+/- $13,058). Approximately, 11.4% of families and 16.4% of the population were below the poverty line, including 18.6% of those under the age of 18 and 8.5% of those ages 65 or over.

=== 2010 census ===
As of the census of 2010, there were 331 people, 171 households, and 82 families residing in the city. The population density was 719.6 inhabitants per square mile (277.8/km^{2}). There were 199 housing units at an average density of 432.6 per square mile (167.0/km^{2}). The racial makeup of the city was 97.9% White, 0.9% Native American, 0.9% from other races, and 0.3% from two or more races. Hispanic or Latino of any race were 3.6% of the population.

There were 171 households, of which 18.7% had children under the age of 18 living with them, 40.4% were married couples living together, 5.3% had a female householder with no husband present, 2.3% had a male householder with no wife present, and 52.0% were non-families. 48.5% of all households were made up of individuals, and 18.1% had someone living alone who was 65 years of age or older. The average household size was 1.92 and the average family size was 2.77.

The median age in the city was 46.5 years. 18.7% of residents were under the age of 18; 5.6% were between the ages of 18 and 24; 23.4% were from 25 to 44; 27.8% were from 45 to 64; and 24.2% were 65 years of age or older. The gender makeup of the city was 52.0% male and 48.0% female.

=== 2000 census ===
As of the census of 2000, there were 357 people, 171 households, and 81 families residing in the city. The population density was 770.1 inhabitants per square mile (297.3/km^{2}). There were 202 housing units at an average density of 435.7 per square mile (168.2/km^{2}). The racial makeup of the city was 99.44% White, 0.28% from other races, and 0.28% from two or more races. Hispanic or Latino of any race were 0.84% of the population.

There were 171 households, out of which 18.7% had children under the age of 18 living with them, 39.2% were married couples living together, 5.3% had a female householder with no husband present, and 52.6% were non-families. 50.3% of all households were made up of individuals, and 29.8% had someone living alone who was 65 years of age or older. The average household size was 1.95 and the average family size was 2.88.

In the city, the population was spread out, with 18.5% under the age of 18, 5.0% from 18 to 24, 26.1% from 25 to 44, 23.2% from 45 to 64, and 27.2% who were 65 years of age or older. The median age was 45 years. For every 100 females, there were 97.2 males. For every 100 females age 18 and over, there were 91.4 males.

The median income for a household in the city was $25,750, and the median income for a family was $38,125. Males had a median income of $26,250 versus $16,635 for females. The per capita income for the city was $15,084. About 8.3% of families and 19.5% of the population were below the poverty line, including 21.9% of those under age 18 and 13.1% of those age 65 or over.

== Education ==
The community is served by Washington County USD 108 public school district, which formed in 2006 by the consolidation of North Central USD 221 and Washington USD 222. The Washington County High School mascot is Tigers.

The Greenleaf High School mascot was Greenleaf Trojans.

== See also ==
- Central Branch Union Pacific Railroad
