= K-107 (Kansas highway) =

State highway in Kansas, United States

K-107
- K-107 before being decommissioned highlighted in red

Route information
- Maintained by KDOT
- Length: 4.830 mi (7.773 km)
- Existed: 1937–1978

Major junctions
- South end: K-32 in Edwardsville
- North end: US-24 / US-40 / US-73 west of Kansas City

Location
- Country: United States
- State: Kansas
- Counties: Wyandotte

Highway system
- Kansas State Highway System; Interstate; US; State; Spurs
← K-106	→ K-108

K-107 was a 4.830-mile-long (7.773 km) state highway in the U.S. state of Kansas. K-107's southern terminus was at K-32 in the city of Edwardsville and the northern terminus was at U.S. Route 24 (US-24), US-40 and US-73 west of Kansas City.

== History ==
K-107 was first designated a state highway in a March 1, 1937 resolution. At that time it ran from K-32 in Edwardsville to K-30. It then continued past here and ended at US-40.

== Major intersections ==
The entire route was in Wyandotte County.

Location	mi	km	Destinations	Notes
Edwardsville	0.000	0.000	K-32	Southern terminus
	4.830	7.773	US-24 / US-40 / US-73	Northern terminus
1.000 mi = 1.609 km; 1.000 km = 0.621 mi
