= Vliets, Kansas =

Unincorporated community in Marshall County, Kansas

- Unincorporated community
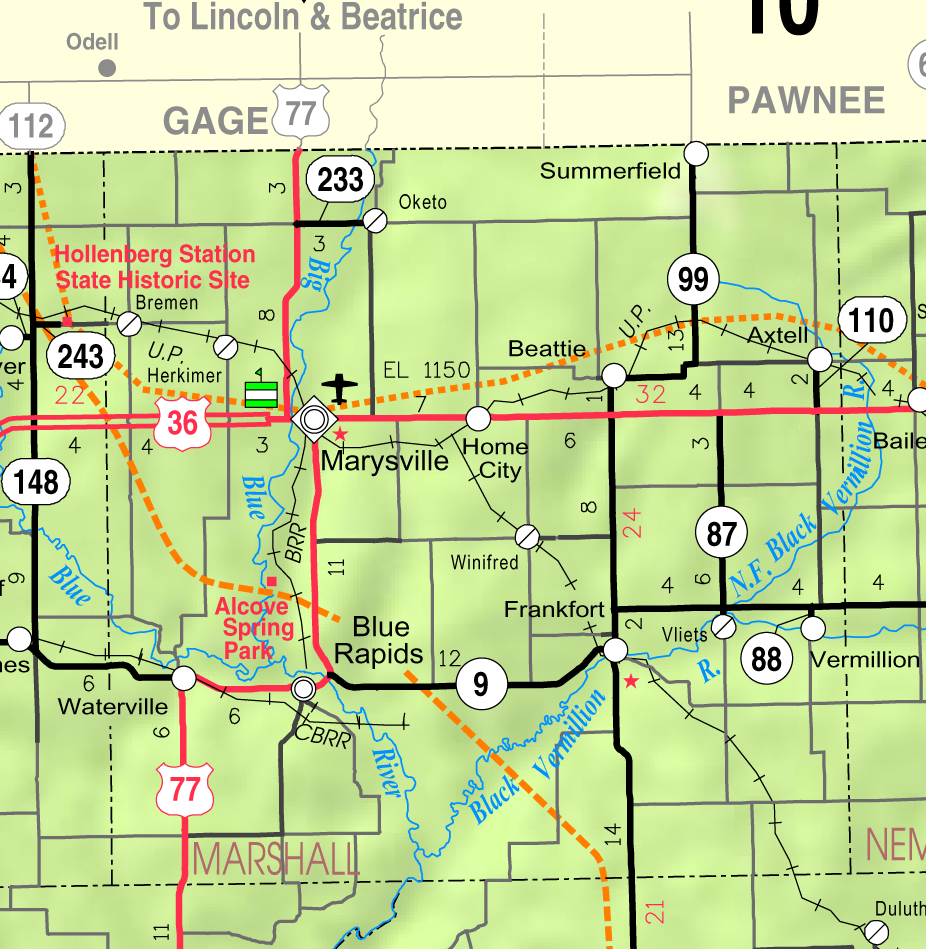
- KDOT map of Marshall County (legend)

- Location within Kansas Location within the United States
- Coordinates: 39°42′50″N 96°20′01″W
- Country: United States
- State: Kansas
- County: Marshall
- Founded: 1889
- Platted: 1889
- Named for: Van Vliet family
- Elevation: 1,168 ft (356 m)
- Time zone: UTC-6 (CST)
  - Summer (DST): UTC-5 (CDT)
- Area code: 785
- FIPS code: 20-74100
- GNIS ID: 473203

Vliets is an unincorporated community in Marshall County, Kansas, United States. It is located at the southern terminus of Kansas Highway 87.

== History ==
Vliets was laid out in 1889. It was named for the Van Vliet family, the original owner of the town site. A post office was opened in Vliets in 1897, and remained in operation until it was discontinued in 1992.

The community currently consists of a Co-op, a granary, and perhaps a dozen houses.

== Education ==
The community and nearby rural areas are served by Vermillion USD 380 public school district.
