= Washington County USD 108 =

Public school district in Washington, Kansas

Address
- 101 W. College St. Washington, Kansas, 66968; United States
- Coordinates: 39°49′21″N 97°3′17″W

District information
- Type: Public
- Grades: K to 12
- Schools: 2

Other information
- Website: usd108.org

Washington County USD 108 is a public unified school district headquartered in Washington, Kansas, United States. The district includes the communities of Washington, Greenleaf, Haddam, Mahaska, Morrowville, and nearby rural areas.

== Schools ==
The school district operates the following schools:

- Washington County Jr/Sr High School (grades 7-12)
- Washington Elementary School (K-6)

== History ==
In 1945 (after World War II), the School Reorganization Act in Kansas caused the consolidation of thousands of rural school districts in Kansas.

In 1963, the School Unification Act in Kansas caused the further consolidatation of thousands of tiny school districts into hundreds of larger Unified School Districts.

Washington County USD 108 was formed in 2006 by the consolidation of North Central USD 221 and Washington-Greenleaf USD 222.

== See also ==
- Kansas State Department of Education
- Kansas State High School Activities Association
- List of high schools in Kansas
- List of unified school districts in Kansas
