= K-32 (Kansas highway) =

State highway in Kansas, U.S.

K-32
- Kaw Valley Scenic Highway
- K-32 in red, K-32 Truck in blue

Route information
- Maintained by KDOT and the cities of Bonner Springs, and Kansas City
- Length: 32.197 mi (51.816 km)
- Existed: 1927–present

Major junctions
- West end: US-24 / US-40 near Lawrence
- K-7 in Bonner Springs; I-435 near Edwardsville; I-635 in Kansas City
- East end: US-69 in Kansas City

Location
- Country: United States
- State: Kansas
- Counties: Douglas, Leavenworth, Wyandotte

Highway system
- Kansas State Highway System; Interstate; US; State; Spurs
← K-31	→ K-33

K-32, also known as the Kaw Valley Scenic Highway, is an approximately 32.2-mile-long (51.8 km) east–west state highway in the Kansas City metropolitan area of Kansas. K-32's western terminus is just outside Lawrence at U.S. Route 24 (US-24) and US-40. Its eastern terminus is at US-69, also known as the 18th Street Expressway, in Kansas City. Along the way it intersects several major highways, including K-7 in Bonner Springs as well as Interstate 435 (I-435) and I-635 in Kansas City. In Kansas City, K-32 follows the Turner Diagonal from Kaw Drive to Kansas Avenue. From its western terminus to Bonner Springs, the highway is a two-lane rural highway; the remaining section is a four-lane highway that runs through residential areas.

K-32 was first established as a state highway in 1927. At that time, the highway ran from US-40 northeast of Lawrence to the Missouri border in Kansas City. By 1937, K-32 was realigned off of Kansas Avenue to follow Muncie Bluff Road and Central Avenue through Kansas City. In the early 1950s, the highway was built on a new alignment to the east and west of Linwood. In the late-1960s, K-32 was upgraded to a four-lane highway between Bonner Springs and Kansas City. In the early-1990s, K-132 was decommissioned, at which time K-32 was realigned onto the former section from K-32 eastward. K-32's alignment has not changed since the latter realignment.

== Route description ==
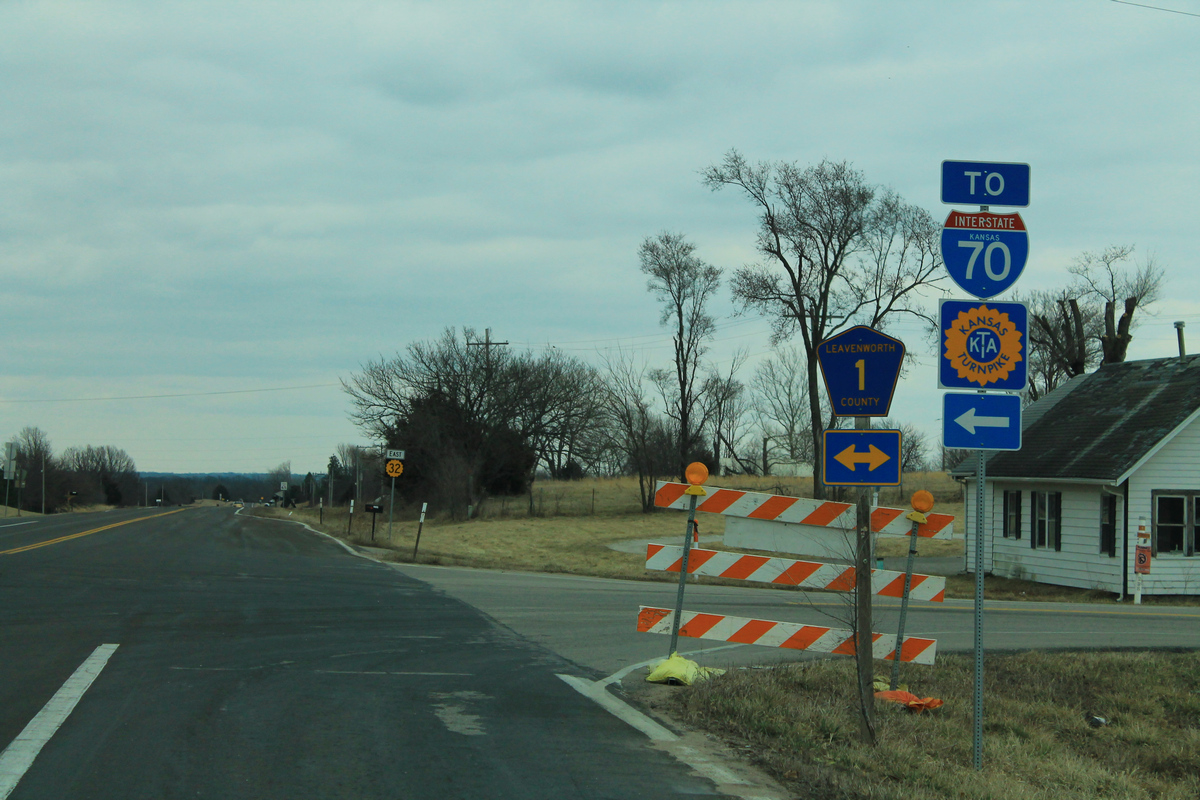
K-32 eastbound at CR-1

K-32's western terminus is at U.S. Route 24 (US-24) and US-40 in extreme northeastern Douglas County, northeast of Lawrence. From this intersection, K-32 heads east along Linwood Road and quickly enters Leavenworth County. The highway crosses over Interstate 70 (I-70) and the Kansas Turnpike; however, there is no connection. The roadway proceeds east to Golden Road, where the highway shifts north slightly as it crosses Kent Creek. K-32 continues to an intersection with County Route 1, which connects K-32 with I-70 and the Kansas Turnpike. The roadway continues east and soon enters the northern part of Linwood. The highway exits the city and crosses over Stranger Creek then curves northeast and passes Saroxie Lake. K-32 continues to Hemphill Road, where it curves east, then intersects 170th Street. The highway crosses Little Kaw Creek then intersects North 158th Street south of Basehor.

K-32 crosses into Wyandotte County as it enters Bonner Springs as Kump Avenue. The highway crosses Wolf Creek then intersects K-32 Truck (Scheidt Lane). The roadway curves south then intersects the eastern terminus of K-32 Truck (Front Street). K-32 heads northeast along Front Street, parallel with a BNSF Railway track. The highway transitions to four lanes then reaches a partial cloverleaf interchange with K-7. The roadway curves more east and begins to parallel Mission Creek then enters Edwardsville south of the Lake of the Forest. In Edwardsville, it picks up the name of Kaw Drive. K-32 intersects North 4th Street (former K-107) then crosses Beits Creek.

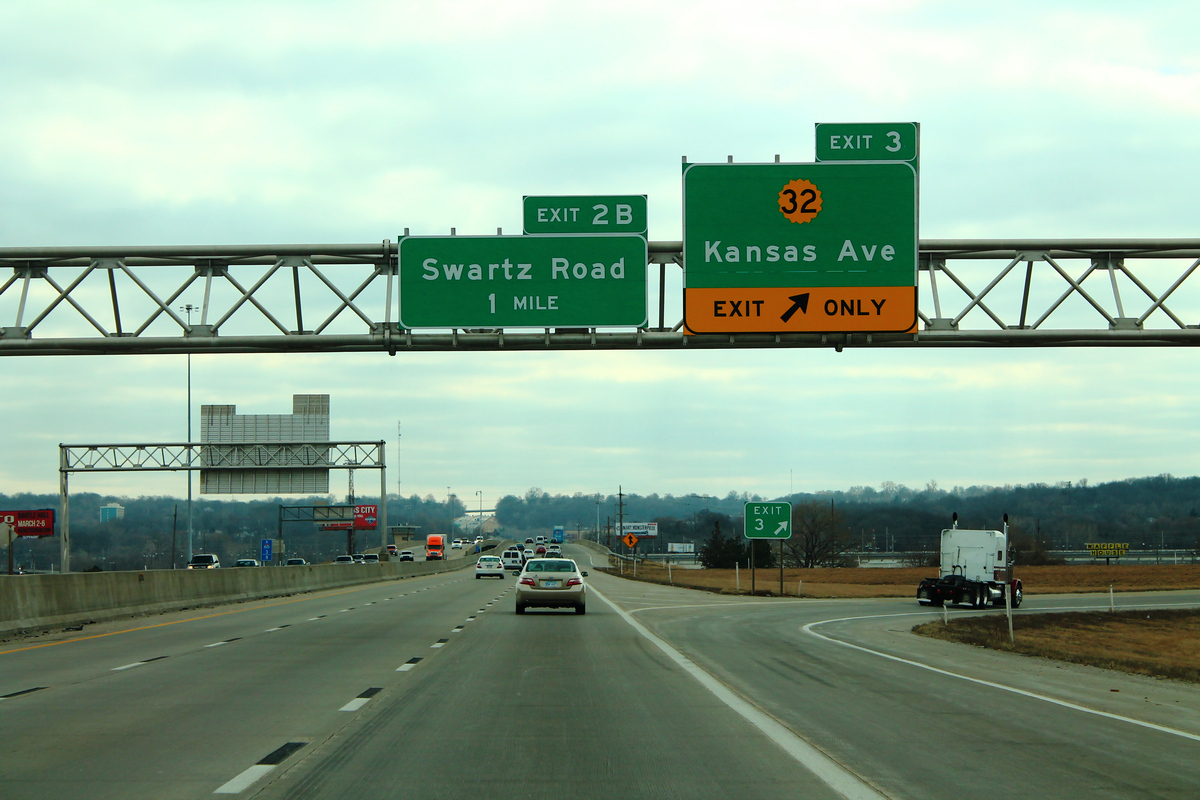
I-635 exit for K-32

K-32 continues through the city to a partial cloverleaf interchange with I-435 on the Edwardsville–Kansas City line. The highway curves more northeast and passes through the southwest portion of Kansas City before reaching an interchange with the Turner Diagonal. Here, K-32 turns southeast and crosses the Kansas River. The highway intersects South 55th Street then continues east along the north edge of the BNSF Railway yard. K-32 reaches a partial cloverleaf interchange with I-635 as it enters a heavy industrial area. East of I-635, K-32 crosses the Kansas River again before reaching its eastern terminus at a partial cloverleaf interchange with US-69, also known as the 18th Street Expressway. Past US-69, the highway continues as Kansas Avenue.

The entire length of K-32 is known as the Kaw Valley Scenic Highway. The Kansas Department of Transportation (KDOT) tracks the traffic levels on its highways. On K-32 in 2020, they determined that on average the traffic varied from 2,010 vehicles per day near the western terminus to 16,000 vehicles per day slightly east of I-635. The majority of K-32 is maintained by KDOT; the section in Bonner Springs from the west city limit to the southbound on-ramp for K-7 and the section in Kansas City from South 55th Street to US-69 are maintained by those municipalities. The section of K-32 from K-7 eastward is part of the National Highway System.

== History ==
K-32 was first established as a state highway by the Kansas State Highway Commission (SHC), now known as KDOT, in 1927. At that time, the highway went from US-40 northeast of Lawrence and through Bonner Springs to the Missouri border in Kansas City, following Kansas Avenue through Kansas City. By 1937, K-32 was realigned to follow Muncie Bluff Road and Central Avenue through Kansas City. In a resolution passed on July 1, 1937, the SHC approved to designate the former section of K-32 along Kansas Avenue as K-132. In a resolution passed on May 8, 1945, it was approved to realign K-32's western terminus slightly northeastward, which eliminated a crossing over Mud Creek. Prior to this, the highway got covered with water every time Mud Creek flooded.

K-32 originally followed Golden Road west of Linwood. East of Linwood it continued east along Golden Road to 170th Street (County Route 3), where it turned north. It continued north to Hemphill Road, where it turned east. In a resolution approved on September 11, 1945, it was approved to realign K-32 to leave Linwood and travel directly northeast to Hemphill Road. Then in a resolution approved on January 10, 1952, that resolution was updated to include the section of K-32 from Linwood west to Golden Road. At the end of August 1952, the SHC asked for bids for grading and a bridge on the new location of K-32 from Linwood northeastward and bids for grading for a new location of K-32 from the Leavenworth-Douglas county line east to Linwood. On October 1, 1952, the SCH approved a $424,305 (equivalent to $4.01 million in 2024 dollars) bid for the two sections. By the end of July 1953, grading work was nearly complete, with work remaining to be done on the bridge over Stranger Creek.

By 1957, the Kansas Turnpike (I-70) had been built through Kansas City, including an exit with K-32. By 1962, US-40 was realigned to follow the Turner Diagonal to K-32 then overlap the latter to I-70. Also, K-32's eastern terminus was extended to the Turnpike.

At the end of August 1967, the SHC asked for bids to add a pair of lanes to K-32 from 88th Street in Kansas City west to K-7 in Bonner Springs. In late September 1967, the SHC accepted bids for grading, pavement, seeding, and four bridges on the project, as well as drainage and surfacing work on K-7 at the interchange with K-32. The project was completed by 1969.

By 1969, the overlap between US-40 and I-70 was extended west to exit 415, which removed the overlap between K-32 and US-40. In the early 1970s, the entire length of K-32 was designated as the Kaw Valley Scenic Highway. By 1981, I-435 had been built from K-32 southward to just south of K-10. By 1984, I-435 had been extended north slightly past K-32. By 1993, K-132 was decommissioned, and K-32 was realigned to follow the section of the former highway east to US-69. By 2011, the exit with County Route 1 was built. This created a connection with I-70 and US-40 north of K-32.

== Major intersections ==
County	Location	mi	km	Destinations	Notes
Douglas	Grant Township	0.000	0.000	US-24 / US-40 – Lawrence, Tonganoxie	Western terminus
Leavenworth	Reno Township	2.688	4.326	Golden Road	Former routing of K-32
Leavenworth	Reno Township	5.428	8.736	CR 1 to I-70 / Kansas Turnpike	
Leavenworth	Fairmount–Sherman township line	13.509	21.741	170th Street	Former routing of K-32
Wyandotte	Bonner Springs	17.697	28.481	K-32 Truck east (Scheidt Lane)	Western terminus of K-32 Truck
Wyandotte	Bonner Springs	18.797	30.251	K-32 Truck west (East Front Street)	Eastern terminus of K-32 Truck
Wyandotte	Bonner Springs	19.116	30.764	K-7 – Leavenworth, Olathe	Partial cloverleaf interchange
Wyandotte	Edwardsville	21.984	35.380	North 4th Street	Former K-107
Wyandotte	Edwardsville–Kansas City line	23.592	37.968	I-435	I-435 exit 9; partial cloverleaf interchange
Wyandotte	Kansas City	28.196	45.377	Turner Diagonal	Interchange; westbound exit and eastbound entrance; old K-132
Wyandotte	Kansas City	28.196	45.377	Kaw Drive east	Interchange; former K-32
Wyandotte	Kansas City	30.487	49.064	I-635	I-635 exit 3; partial cloverleaf interchange
Wyandotte	Kansas City	32.197	51.816	US-69 (18th Street Expressway)	Eastern terminus; partial cloverleaf interchange
Wyandotte	Kansas City	32.197	51.816	Kansas Avenue to Avenida Cesar E Chavez and 22nd Street	Continuation past US-69
1.000 mi = 1.609 km; 1.000 km = 0.621 mi: Incomplete access

== Special routes ==
=== Truck route ===
K-32 Truck
- Location: Bonner Springs
- Existed: May 1, 2000–present

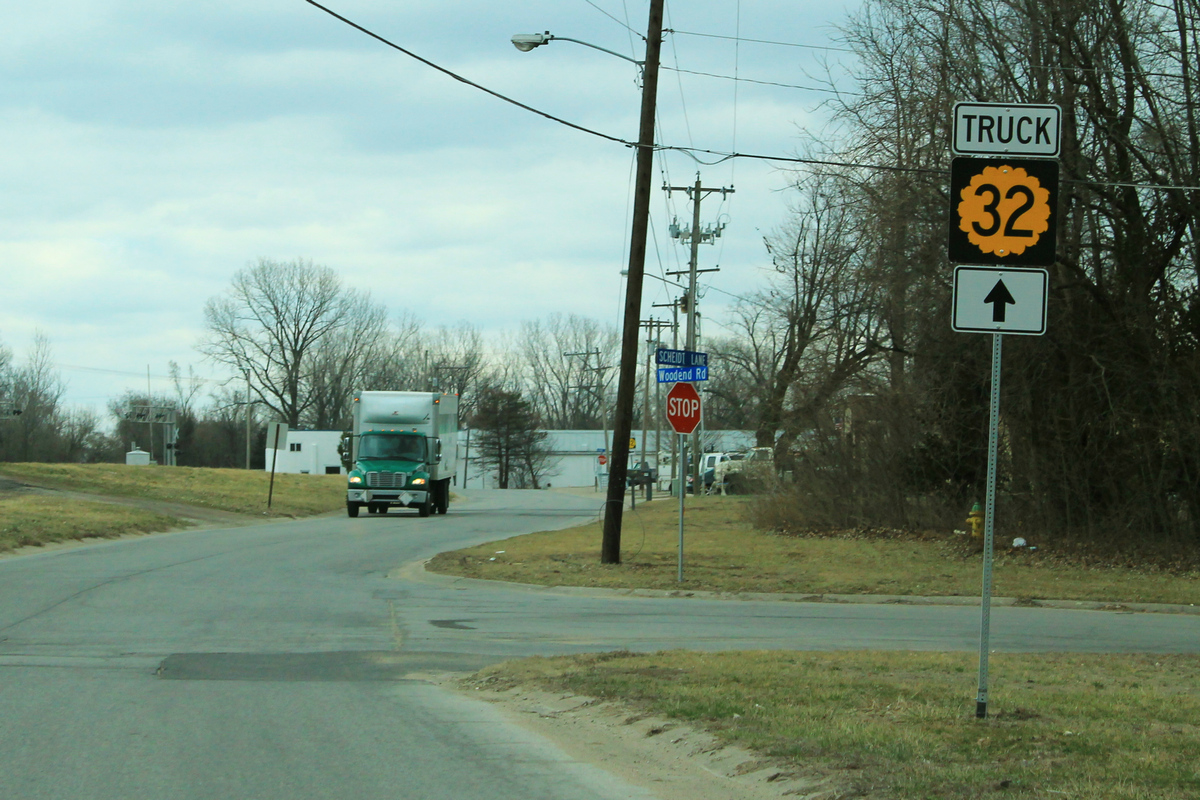
K-32 Truck eastbound

K-32 Truck is a truck route of K-32 that serves Bonner Springs and bypasses the downtown area. Starting from K-32 west of the city, it begins traveling southeastward along Scheidt Lane. The roadway reaches an intersection with East Front Street, where it turns northeast. The highway reaches an at-grade crossing with a track as it begins to parallel the Kansas River. K-32 Truck proceeds to its eastern terminus at the intersection of Front and Cedar streets, with K-32 continuing east on Front Street. K-32. The truck route was approved on May 1, 2000, in a city council meeting, alongside an ordinance prohibiting trucks on Cedar Street and Kump Avenue.

=== Former temporary route ===
K-32 Temporary
- Location: Kansas City
- Existed: c. 1934–July 1, 1937

Temporary K-32 was a former temporary route for K-32 that ran along the former section of K-32 along Dan Wilson Road and Kansas Avenue in Kansas City. In a resolution passed on July 1, 1937, K-132 was approved to be established, replacing the entire length of Temporary K-32.
