= Haddam, Kansas =

City in Washington County, Kansas

- City
- Location within Washington County and Kansas

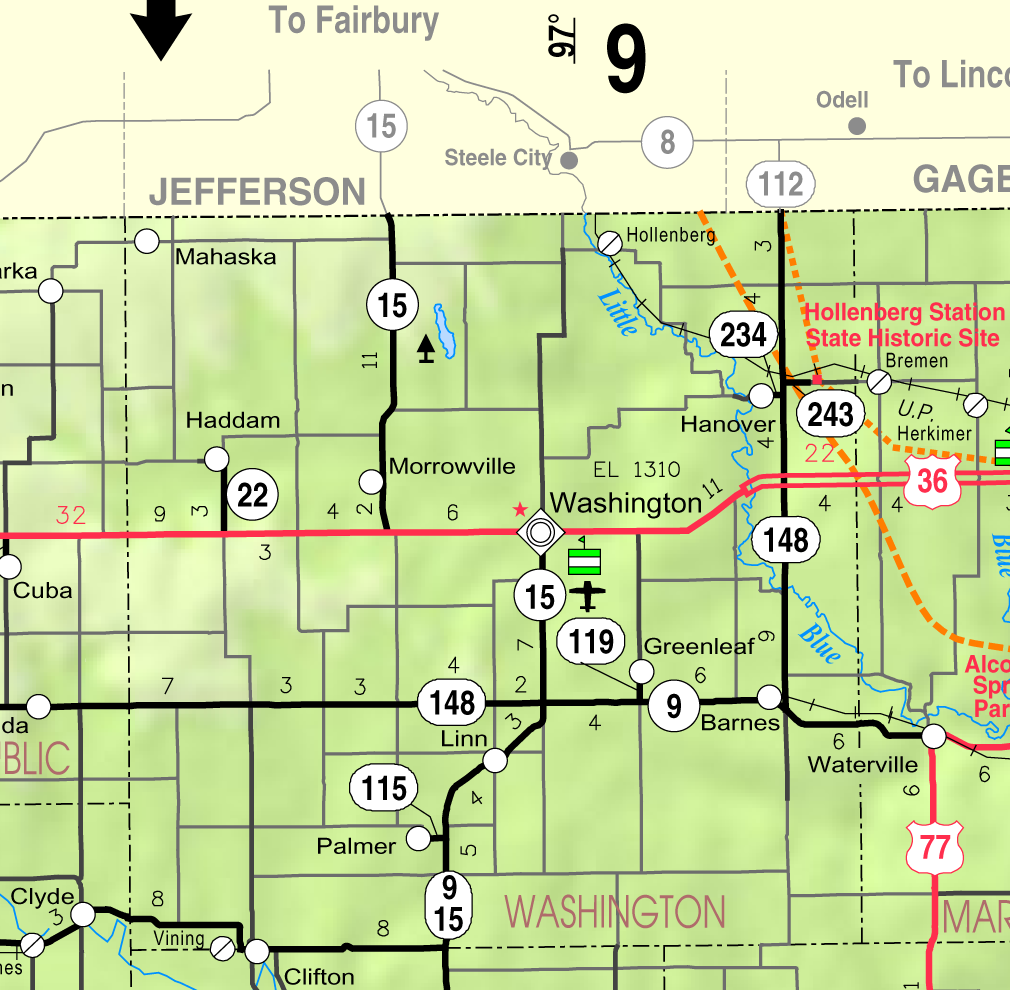
- KDOT map of Washington County (legend)
- Coordinates: 39°51′19″N 97°18′15″W
- Country: United States
- State: Kansas
- County: Washington
- Founded: 1869
- Incorporated: 1886
- Named for: Haddam, Connecticut

Area
  - Total: 0.34 sq mi (0.89 km^{2})
  - Land: 0.34 sq mi (0.89 km^{2})
  - Water: 0 sq mi (0.00 km^{2})
- Elevation: 1,391 ft (424 m)

Population (2020)
  - Total: 110
  - Density: 320/sq mi (120/km^{2})
- Time zone: UTC-6 (CST)
  - Summer (DST): UTC-5 (CDT)
- ZIP Code: 66944
- Area code: 785
- FIPS code: 20-29400
- GNIS ID: 2394265
- Website: ci.haddam.ks.us

Haddam is a city in Washington County, Kansas, United States. It is named after Haddam, Connecticut. As of the 2020 census, the population of the city was 110.

== History ==
Haddam was founded in 1869. It was named after Haddam, Connecticut. In 1874, the rival town of West Haddam merged with Haddam.

== Geography ==
According to the United States Census Bureau, the city has a total area of 0.35 square miles (0.91 km^{2}), all land.

== Demographics ==
Historical population
Census	Pop.	Note	%±
1880	93		—
1890	419		350.5%
1900	355		−15.3%
1910	408		14.9%
1920	392		−3.9%
1930	381		−2.8%
1940	384		0.8%
1950	375		−2.3%
1960	311		−17.1%
1970	289		−7.1%
1980	239		−17.3%
1990	195		−18.4%
2000	169		−13.3%
2010	104		−38.5%
2020	110		5.8%
U.S. Decennial Census

=== 2020 census ===
The 2020 United States census counted 110 people, 33 households, and 24 families in Haddam. The population density was 320.7 per square mile (123.8/km^{2}). There were 67 housing units at an average density of 195.3 per square mile (75.4/km^{2}). The racial makeup was 92.73% (102) white or European American (89.09% non-Hispanic white), 1.82% (2) black or African-American, 0.0% (0) Native American or Alaska Native, 0.91% (1) Asian, 0.0% (0) Pacific Islander or Native Hawaiian, 0.0% (0) from other races, and 4.55% (5) from two or more races. Hispanic or Latino of any race was 4.55% (5) of the population.

Of the 33 households, 33.3% had children under the age of 18; 63.6% were married couples living together; 9.1% had a female householder with no spouse or partner present. 21.2% of households consisted of individuals and 12.1% had someone living alone who was 65 years of age or older. The average household size was 3.3 and the average family size was 3.5. The percent of those with a bachelor's degree or higher was estimated to be 31.8% of the population.

33.6% of the population was under the age of 18, 2.7% from 18 to 24, 23.6% from 25 to 44, 20.0% from 45 to 64, and 20.0% who were 65 years of age or older. The median age was 33.8 years. For every 100 females, there were 93.0 males. For every 100 females ages 18 and older, there were 102.8 males.

The 2016–2020 5-year American Community Survey estimates show that the median household income was $65,385 (with a margin of error of +/- $10,813) and the median family income was $65,385 (+/- $11,524). Males had a median income of $36,528 (+/- $7,220) versus $28,750 (+/- $1,433) for females. The median income for those above 16 years old was $30,000 (+/- $7,905). Approximately, 0.0% of families and 2.0% of the population were below the poverty line, including 0.0% of those under the age of 18 and 8.7% of those ages 65 or over.

=== 2010 census ===
As of the census of 2010, there were 104 people, 52 households, and 29 families residing in the city. The population density was 297.1 inhabitants per square mile (114.7/km^{2}). There were 88 housing units at an average density of 251.4 per square mile (97.1/km^{2}). The racial makeup of the city was 97.1% White, 1.0% Native American, and 1.9% from two or more races. Hispanic or Latino of any race were 1.0% of the population.

There were 52 households, of which 17.3% had children under the age of 18 living with them, 44.2% were married couples living together, 5.8% had a female householder with no husband present, 5.8% had a male householder with no wife present, and 44.2% were non-families. 40.4% of all households were made up of individuals, and 30.7% had someone living alone who was 65 years of age or older. The average household size was 2.00 and the average family size was 2.69.

The median age in the city was 52.8 years. 17.3% of residents were under the age of 18; 6.7% were between the ages of 18 and 24; 10.6% were from 25 to 44; 35.6% were from 45 to 64; and 29.8% were 65 years of age or older. The gender makeup of the city was 44.2% male and 55.8% female.

=== 2000 census ===
As of the census of 2000, there were 169 people, 73 households, and 48 families residing in the city. The population density was 487.7 inhabitants per square mile (188.3/km^{2}). There were 96 housing units at an average density of 277.0 per square mile (107.0/km^{2}). The racial makeup of the city was 97.04% White, 1.18% Native American, and 1.78% from two or more races. Hispanic or Latino of any race were 0.59% of the population.

There were 73 households, out of which 21.9% had children under the age of 18 living with them, 61.6% were married couples living together, 4.1% had a female householder with no husband present, and 34.2% were non-families. 34.2% of all households were made up of individuals, and 21.9% had someone living alone who was 65 years of age or older. The average household size was 2.32 and the average family size was 2.96.

In the city, the population was spread out, with 23.7% under the age of 18, 5.3% from 18 to 24, 20.1% from 25 to 44, 23.1% from 45 to 64, and 27.8% who were 65 years of age or older. The median age was 46 years. For every 100 females, there were 128.4 males. For every 100 females age 18 and over, there were 101.6 males.

The median income for a household in the city was $20,000, and the median income for a family was $30,000. Males had a median income of $20,341 versus $14,375 for females. The per capita income for the city was $12,555. About 9.1% of families and 16.3% of the population were below the poverty line, including 26.2% of those under the age of eighteen and 3.4% of those 65 or over.

== Education ==
The community is served by Washington County USD 108 public school district, which formed in 2006 by the consolidation of North Central USD 221 and Washington USD 222. The Washington County High School mascot is Tigers.

School unification consolidated Mahaska and Haddam schools into Haddam-Mahaska schools in 1967. The high school was in Haddam, with grade schools in both communities. In 1968, Haddam-Mahaska combined with Morrowville to form North Central Schools. The grade school and junior high were in Haddam and the high school was in Morrowville.

The Haddam High School mascot was Haddam Hounds. The North Central Junior high mascot was the Wildcats and the high school mascot was the Cougars.
