= 18th Street Expressway =

Road in Kansas, United States

- South end: I-35 / US-69 south in Kansas City
- Major junctions: K-32 in Kansas City
- North end: I-70 / US-24 / US-40 / US-69 north in Kansas City

The 18th Street Expressway (often shortened to 18th Street in everyday speech) is a freeway in Kansas City, Kansas, United States, that runs from Interstate 35 north to Interstate 70/U.S. Route 24/U.S. Route 40. It carries the U.S. Route 69 designation its entire length.

== Route description ==
Exit 232B from Interstate 35 is a diamond interchange with traffic lights north of the Johnson County line, just inside Kansas City. This diamond interchange serves as the northern terminus of Roe Boulevard from Roeland Park, as well as the southern terminus of the 18th Street Expressway. US 69 northbound leaves I-35 northbound at this interchange, turning north to travel along the expressway. The expressway bridges the BNSF rail line as well as Merriam Lane, and has a partial diamond interchange with the latter (the ramps from Merriam to southbound 18th Street and from northbound 18th Street to Merriam are omitted due to the proximity of the I-35 interchange).

18th Street continues northward through Kansas City, with exits at Steele Road and Ruby Avenue, a residential street (this second interchange, a parclo interchange, also serves Metropolitan Avenue, a more major arterial.) The freeway then crosses the Kansas River and the east end of the BNSF rail yard on the 18th Street Expressway Bridge. After coming off the bridge, the freeway meets the eastern terminus of K-32, which runs along Kansas Avenue. K-32 is the only other numbered route that 18th Street Expressway intersects aside from those at its termini. The K-32/Kansas Avenue interchange is also of the parclo design.

North of the K-32 interchange, 18th Street passes over another rail yard, this one belonging to Union Pacific. On the northern edge of this rail yard lies I-70. 18th Street provides access to this highway via a traditional cloverleaf interchange. This interchange, Exits 420A–B from I-70, also serves as the official eastern terminus of the Kansas Turnpike, though the actual tolled section ends 10 miles (16 km) further west. The expressway ends at I-70, with northbound US-69 joining I-70 eastbound in a concurrency. North of this interchange, the mainline drops the word "Expressway" from its title to become 18th Street. It continues north as a typical urban arterial.

== History ==
The 18th Street Expressway was the result of one of four feasibility studies conducted by the Kansas Turnpike Authority to extend the turnpike by providing easy access to northeast Johnson County. It was the only one of the four studies to be followed upon, with completion of the 18th Street Expressway Bridge over the Kansas River completed in 1959. It replaced the Argentine Boulevard bridge over the river behind the modern-day BNSF railroad yard.

Originally, the highway was part of the original K-58. Upon completion of the bridge, US 69 was rerouted onto the expressway from Southwest Boulevard (the section of which has since been renamed to Merriam Drive). In 1979, the K-58 designation was removed.

The section of 18th Street between I-70 and the south end of the Kansas River bridge was tolled at least as late as 1984.

In 2026, the bridge portion of the route was demolished to prepare for construction of a replacement bridge. While the bridge is closed, traffic will be detoured via the 7th Street Trafficway Bridge.

== Exit list ==
The entire route is in Kansas City, Wyandotte County. All exits are unnumbered.

mi	km	Destinations	Notes
0.00	0.00	I-35 / US-69 south – Des Moines, Wichita	Diamond interchange, ramps controlled by traffic signals on 18th Street. Road continues south as Roe Boulevard.
0.00	0.00	South end of freeway	
		Merriam Lane	Southbound exit and northbound entrance
		Steele Road	
		Ruby Avenue, Metropolitan Avenue	
		K-32 (Kansas Avenue)	
		I-70 / US-24 / US-40 / US-69 north / Kansas Turnpike west – St. Louis, Topeka	Road continues as 18th Street
1.000 mi = 1.609 km; 1.000 km = 0.621 mi: Incomplete access
