= List of state highway spurs in Kansas =

Kansas state highway spurs
- Highway markers for K-22, K-131, and K-368

Highway names
- Interstates: Interstate nn (I-nn)
- US Highways: U.S. Highway nn (US-nn)
- State: K-nn

System links
- Kansas State Highway System; Interstate; US; State; Spurs

The Kansas state highway system includes and has included many state highway spurs that connect through highways with places that are not along a through highway. The Kansas Department of Transportation and its predecessor agencies have established most of these highways to serve small cities. In most cases, the spur highway connecting a through route with a city ends at the city limit of the city. The spur highways also serve unincorporated villages, state institutions like psychiatric hospitals, state parks and other Kansas Department of Wildlife, Parks and Tourism–administered facilities, and historic sites.

== K-22 ==
K-22
- Location: Haddam
- Length: 3.087 mi (4.968 km)
- Existed: 1941–present

K-22 is a 3.087-mile-long (4.968 km) spur route that serves the city of Haddam in west central Washington County.

== K-30 ==
K-30
- Location: Maple Hill
- Length: 1.950 mi (3.138 km)
- Existed: 1950–present

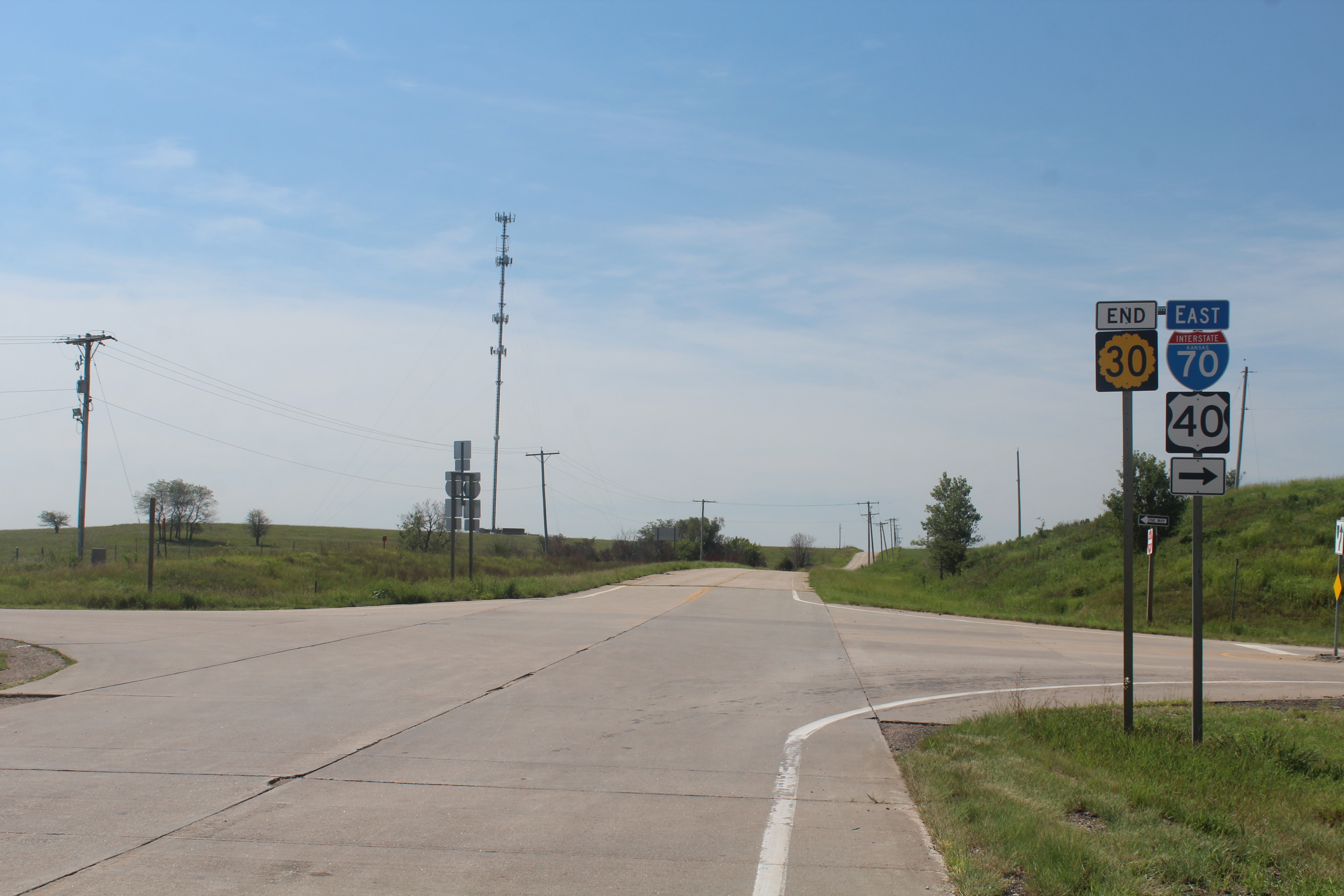
The southern terminus of K-30

K-30 is a 1.950-mile-long (3.138 km) spur route that serves the city of Maple Hill in northeastern Wabaunsee County.

== K-41 ==
K-41
- Location: Delphos
- Length: 4.960 mi (7.982 km)
- Existed: 1938–present

K-41 is a 4.960-mile-long (7.982 km) spur route that serves the city of Delphos in north central Ottawa County.

== K-46 ==
K-46
- Location: Little River
- Length: 1.315 mi (2.116 km)
- Existed: 1937–2013

K-46 was a 1.315-mile (2.116 km) north–south spur of US-56 that served the town of Little River. K-46 first appeared on the 1937 Kansas highway map. It was removed from the highway system on June 3, 2013, and reverted to county ownership.

== K-48 ==
K-48
- Location: Atchison
- Length: 0.775 mi (1,247 m)
- Existed: 1939–c. 1980

K-48 was a 0.775-mile-long (1.247 km) spur in the U.S. state of Kansas. K-48's southern terminus was at North 3rd Street / P Street at the Atchison city limits and the northern terminus was at the Nash School orphans home north of Atchison. K-48 was not connected to any other Kansas state highway.

== K-67 ==
K-67
- Location: Norton
- Length: 0.972 mi (1,564 m)
- Existed: 1938–present

K-67 is a 0.972-mile-long (1.564 km) spur route that serves the Kansas Department of Corrections Norton Correctional Facility east of Norton in central Norton County. The highway begins at US-36 and K-383, which run concurrently east–west, and immediately has a grade crossing of the Kyle Railroad. K-67 passes along the east side of the state prison and crosses Prairie Dog Creek before reaching its northern terminus at the next section line road. K-67 has existed since at least January 1938. Before K-67 provided access to Norton Correctional Facility, the highway served Norton State Hospital on the same site. The state hospital closed in 1988.

== K-71 ==
K-71
- Location: Bern
- Length: 4.581 mi (7.372 km)
- Existed: 1932–present

K-71 is a 4.581-mile-long (7.372 km) spur route that serves the city of Bern in north central Nemaha County. The route begins at an intersection with K-63 and heads east to Bern, where it ends at an intersection with 216th Road and Matthews Avenue.

== K-72 ==
K-72
- Location: Basehor
- Existed: 1932–1973

K-72 was a spur route that served the city of Basehor. The highway began at US-24 and US-40 and ran northward to the Basehor city limits. The Kansas Department of Transportation removed K-72 from the state highway system in 1973 and it is now known as 155th Street.

== K-74 ==
K-74
- Location: Potter
- Length: 3.440 mi (5.536 km)
- Existed: 1932–2013

K-74 was a spur route that served the city of Potter. The highway began at US-73/K-7 east of Potter and ran south and west to the Potter city limits. K-74 was withdrawn from the highway system by the Kansas Department of Transportation on December 10, 2013.

== K-76 ==
K-76
- Location: Williamstown
- Length: 0.325 mi (523 m)
- Existed: c. 1951–2014

K-76 was a 0.325-mile-long (0.523 km) spur route that served the unincorporated village of Williamstown in southeastern Jefferson County. The highway began at Railroad Avenue just north of the Union Pacific Railroad. K-76 headed north along Oak Street to a four-way intersection with US-24 and US-59. From that intersection, US-24 headed west toward Perry, US-59 headed north toward Oskaloosa, and the two U.S. Highways headed southeast concurrently toward Lawrence. K-76 has existed since before 1951, when the Kansas State Highway Department approved a relocation of US-24 on the north side of Williamstown through a May 23, 1951, resolution. This project moved the US-24–US-59–K-76 intersection south, and US-59 took over the northern part of K-76's course. The Kansas Department of Transportation removed K-76 from the state highway system through a January 3, 2014, resolution.

== K-78 ==
K-78
- Location: Miller
- Length: 1.057 mi (1.701 km)
- Existed: c. 1938–present

K-78 is a 1.057-mile-long (1.701 km) spur route that serves the unincorporated village of Miller in northeastern Lyon County. The highway begins at a junction of section line roads on the northern edge of the village. K-78 heads north to its end at US-56 between Admire and Osage City. A spur to Miller has been part of the state highway system since at 1936. K-78 was assigned to the Miller spur by January 1938 at the latest.

== K-79 ==
K-79
- Location: Circleville
- Length: 3.561 mi (5.731 km)
- Existed: 1932–present

K-79 is a 3.561-mile-long (5.731 km) spur route that serves the city of Circleville in north central Jackson County. The route begins at an intersection with K-16 and heads north to Circleville, where it ends at an intersection with 254th Road and K Road.

== K-80 ==
K-80
- Location: Morganville
- Length: 3.816 mi (6.141 km)
- Existed: 1932–present

K-80 is a 3.816-mile-long (6.141 km) spur route that serves the city of Morganville in north central Clay County. The route begins at an intersection with Jayhawk Road and Allen Street, where it heads east and ends at an intersection with K-15.

== K-84 ==
K-84
- Location: Penokee
- Length: 0.881 mi (1,418 m)
- Existed: c. 1938–present

K-84 is a 0.881-mile-long (1.418 km) spur route that serves the unincorporated village of Penokee in west central Graham County. The highway begins just north of Railroad Avenue in the village, from which the road continues south as 4th Street. K-84 crosses the South Fork Solomon River on its way to its northern terminus at US-24 between Hoxie and Hill City. The main east–west highway of Graham County crossed the South Fork Solomon River at Penokee on its course between Morland and Hill City in 1918. However, by 1932, that highway followed US-24's present course, and a spur route may have been in place south to Penokee. K-84 was assigned to the Penokee spur by January 1938 at the latest.

== K-85 ==
K-85
- Location: Morland
- Length: 0.800 mi (1,287 m)
- Existed: c. 1938–present

K-85 is a 0.800-mile-long (1.287 km) spur route that serves the city of Morland in west central Graham County. The highway begins at the north city limit north of Solomon Street; the road continues as 5th Street. K-85 crosses the South Fork Solomon River on its way to its northern terminus at US-24 between Hoxie and Hill City. The main east–west highway of Graham County followed the south side of the South Fork Solomon River at Morland on its course between Hoxie and the village of Penokee in 1918. However, by 1932, that highway followed US-24's present course, and a spur route may have been in place south to Morland. K-85 was assigned to the Morland spur by January 1938 at the latest.

== K-86 ==
K-86
- Location: Canton
- Length: 0.235 mi (378 m)
- Existed: c. 1938–September 9, 2009

K-86 was a 0.235-mile-long (0.378 km) spur route of U.S. Route 56 (US-56) that served Canton. At the city limits, it became Main Street in Canton. The road continues both north (beyond the city limits of Canton) and south as McPherson County Route 304 (27th Avenue). It continues north to the McPherson State Fishing Lake/Maxwell Game Preserve, Roxbury and Gypsum, ending at K-4. It continues to the south to Hesston, Sedgwick and west Wichita, ending at Wichita Mid-Continent Airport.

History

K-86 was commissioned by 1938. It first appeared on the January 1938 state highway map. K-86 was decommissioned on September 9, 2009, due to the city of Canton annexing land around the highway. In the same highway resolution, K-175 was removed and K-14 was rerouted along K-61 from Arlington to Hutchinson then along K-96 to the former end of the K-14 / K-96 overlap. Also in the same resolution K-61 was slightly realigned southwest of McPherson, realigned around Inman and slightly realigned north-northeast of Hutchinson.

== K-88 ==
K-88
- Location: Vermillion
- Length: 0.466 mi (750 m)
- Existed: 1935–present

K-88, also known as 29th Terrace, is a short 0.466-mile-long (0.750 km) state highway located entirely within Marshall County in the U.S. state of Kansas. K-88's southern terminus is at the end of state maintenance at the Vermillion city limits, where it continues as 29th Terrace. The northern terminus is at K-9 north of the City of Vermillion.

== K-89 ==
K-89
- Location: Halstead
- Length: 1.514 mi (2.437 km)
- Existed: 1932–present

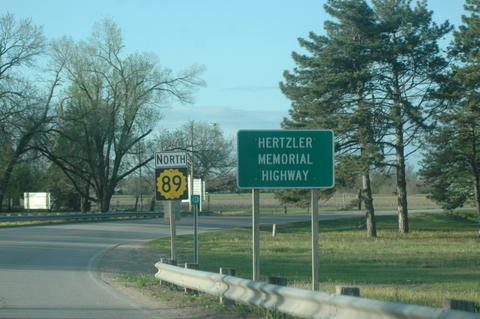
Hertzler Memorial Highway sign at the south end of K-89

K-89 is a 1.514-mile-long (2.437 km) spur route that serves the city of Halstead in central Harvey County. The highway begins at a flood gate at the south end of the highway's bridge across the Little Arkansas River at the north city limit. The road continues south as Main Street, which contains a variety of historic sites, including its post office, museum and former railroad station, a pair of historic homes, and the Bernhard Warkentin Homestead, which is a National Historic Landmark. K-89 heads north by Riverside Park—the site of the Old Settlers Picnic and of filming for the 1955 movie Picnic—along Hertzler Memorial Highway, which honors "Horse and Buggy Doctor" Arthur E. Hertzler. The highway passes through an S-curve to veer east onto a section line road, which the highway follows to its end at US-50 between Burrton and Newton. The roadway that was to become K-89 was originally planned as K-59. The Kansas State Highway Commission approved a purchase order for right of way to construct K-89 on September 13, 1932. The highway was built in the second half of 1934 as an improved dirt road that was partially funded by national recovery grants. However, before the state had paved the highway, the commission decided to eliminate several sharp curves in the highway's planned course and return the unused land to the former property owners in a November 15, 1935, resolution. K-89 was paved on its present course by 1936.

== K-90 ==
K-90
- Location: Leavenworth State Fishing Lake
- Length: 2.180 mi (3.508 km)
- Existed: November 28, 1936–December 9, 1997

K-90 was a 2.180-mile-long (3.508 km) spur route that served Leavenworth State Fishing Lake. The highway began at Leavenworth State Fishing Lake and ran eastward to K-16 northwest of the city of Tonganoxie. K-90 was assigned in a November 28, 1936, resolution. The Kansas Department of Transportation removed K-90 from the state highway system in a December 9, 1997, resolution.

== K-94 ==
K-94
- Location: Clark County State Lake–Kingsdown
- Length: 10.780 mi (17.349 km)
- Existed: September 26, 1962–present

K-94 is a state highway in the U.S. state of Kansas. The highway runs 10.780 miles (17.349 km) from Clark County State Lake north to US-54 in Kingsdown. K-94 was assigned in a September 26, 1962, resolution.

== K-97 ==
K-97
- Location: Sheridan State Game management area
- Length: 5.587 mi (8.991 km)
- Existed: March 24, 1941–July 30, 1958

K-97 was a 5.587-mile-long (8.991 km) spur route that served the Sheridan State Game management area in Sheridan County. The highway began at US-40 and ran northward to the Sheridan State Game management area. K-97 was assigned in a March 24, 1941, resolution, and removed from the state highway system in a July 30, 1958, resolution.

== K-100 ==
K-100
- Location: Topeka
- Length: 0.600 mi (966 m)
- Existed: June 12, 1957–c. 1978

K-100 was a short spur route in the city of Topeka in Shawnee County. The highway began at I-70, US-40 and K-4 at exit 357A of I-70 and ran northward to a dead end at the Kansas Governor's Residence. K-100 was assigned in a June 12, 1957, resolution, and removed from the state highway system between 1978 and 1979. The road is now known as SW Fairlawn Road.

== K-102 ==
K-102
- Location: West Mineral–Scammon
- Length: 5.004 mi (8.053 km)
- Existed: October 11, 1940–present

K-102 is a 5.004-mile-long (8.053 km) spur route that serves the city of West Mineral in Cherokee County. K-102's western terminus is in West Mineral where it continues as Richardson Avenue and the eastern terminus is at K-7 in the City of Scammon. K-102 was assigned in an October 11, 1940, resolution.

== K-105 ==
K-105
- Location: Cross Timbers State Park–Toronto–US-54
- Length: 10.425 mi (16.777 km)
- Existed: January 13, 1941–present

K-105 is a 10.425-mile-long (16.777 km) state highway in the U.S. state of Kansas. K-105's southern terminus is at Carlisle Road in Cross Timbers State Park by the Toronto Lake dam, and the northern terminus is at US-54 north of Toronto. In a January 30, 1940, resolution, US-54 was moved to a new alignment that bypassed the city of Toronto. K-105 was assigned in a January 13, 1941, resolution, as a 2.346-mile-long (3.776 km) spur from US-54 south to Toronto. In a July 26, 1961, resolution, the highway was extended south to the east end of the Toronto Lake dam. In an August 11, 1965, resolution, K-105 was extended west across the dam. In a November 4, 1996, resolution, the highway was extended 0.187 miles (0.301 km) northwest to its current southern terminus.

== K-110 ==
K-110
- Location: Axtell
- Length: 1.760 mi (2.832 km)
- Existed: May 26, 1948–present

K-110 is a 1.760-mile-long (2.832 km) state highway in the U.S. state of Kansas. K-110's southern terminus is at US-36 south of Axtell, and the northern terminus is a continuation as State Street at the Axtell City limits. K-110 was assigned in a May 26, 1948, resolution.

== K-112 ==
K-112
- Location: Esbon
- Length: 2.483 mi (3.996 km)
- Existed: March 30, 1950–present

K-112 is a 2.483-mile-long (3.996 km) spur route that serves the city of Esbon in Jewell County. K-112's southern terminus is at U.S. Route 36 (US-36) and the northern terminus is a continuation as Grand Avenue at the Esbon city limits. In a November 10, 1948, resolution, it was approved to add K-112 to the state highway system as soon as the county had improved the road. By March 1950, it had been improved to state highway standards and in a March 30, 1950, meeting, it was added to the state highway system.

== K-114 ==
K-114
- Location: Ogden
- Length: 0.9 mi (1,400 m)
- Existed: 1977–present

K-114 is a 0.9-mile-long (1.4 km) spur route that serves the city of Ogden in southwestern Riley County. The highway begins at the east city limit of Ogden; the road continues southwest as Riley Street. The highway curves southeast as a four-lane divided highway, crosses a Union Pacific rail line, and reaches its eastern terminus at a partial cloverleaf interchange with K-18, a four-lane freeway that heads northeast toward Manhattan and southwest toward I-70 and Junction City. K-114 was proposed as part of a May 9, 1973, Kansas State Highway Commission resolution to remove K-18 from its course through Fort Riley in favor of a route around the military base between Ogden and Junction City to separate military traffic and regular highway traffic. K-18 would be placed on its present corridor from just east of Ogden south to I-70, and the piece of K-18 between the city of Ogden and the new portion of K-18 would become K-114. The junction of K-18 and K-114 would be a partial interchange featuring a flyover ramp for westbound K-18 and no access from K-114 to westbound K-18 or from eastbound K-18 to K-114. K-114 was established when construction on the K-18 link between Ogden and I-70 was completed between 1975 and 1977. Between 2010 and 2013, K-18 and K-114 were relocated and their present interchange was constructed.

== K-114 (1950–1966) ==
K-114
- Location: Everest
- Length: 0.376 mi (605 m)
- Existed: July 12, 1950–1966

K-114 was a 0.376-mile-long (0.605 km) spur route that served the city of Everest in southeastern Brown County. The highway began at US-73 and K-20, which ran concurrently east–west, between Horton to the west and Huron and Denton to the east. K-114 headed north to the south city limit of Everest, from which the road continued north as Fifth Street. The Kansas State Highway Commission accepted K-114 into the state highway system through a July 12, 1950, resolution. The commission authorized relocations of US-73 and K-20 in and around Everest through an August 12, 1964, resolution. The eastern end of K-20's concurrency with US-73 had been southeast of Everest. The state-numbered highway would be relocated to pass through Everest, assume the course of K-114, and reach its new US-73 junction at what was K-114's southern terminus. K-114 was replaced by K-20 when the relocations were completed in 1966.

== K-115 ==
K-115
- Location: Palmer
- Length: 0.650 mi (1,046 m)
- Existed: April 10, 1946–present

K-115 is a 0.650-mile-long (1.046 km) spur route that serves the city of Palmer in south central Washington County. The highway begins at Pennsylvania Avenue just west of the east city limit at Peats Creek. K-115 heads east along Palmer Avenue to K-9 and K-15, which run concurrently north–south, between Clay Center and Linn. The Kansas State Highway Commission accepted K-115 into the state highway system from Washington County through an April 10, 1946, resolution.

== K-119 ==
K-119
- Location: Greenleaf
- Length: 0.761 mi (1,225 m)
- Existed: October 8, 1947–present

K-119 is a 0.761-mile-long (1.225 km) spur route that serves the city of Greenleaf in east central Washington County. The highway begins at K-9 and K-148, which run concurrently east–west, between Linn and Barnes. K-119 heads north to the south city limit of Greenleaf at 8th Street, from which the road continues north as Main Street. The Kansas State Highway Commission accepted K-119 into the state highway system from Washington County through an October 8, 1947, resolution.

== K-121 ==
K-121
- Location: Stuttgart
- Length: 0.451 mi (726 m)
- Existed: June 25, 1952–May 1, 2014

K-121 was a 0.451-mile-long (0.726 km) spur route that served the city of Stuttgart in Phillips County. The highway began at US-36 and ran eastward to the Stuttgart city limits. K-121 was assigned in a June 25, 1952, resolution, and the Kansas Department of Transportation removed K-121 from the state highway system in a May 1, 2014, resolution.

== K-122 ==
K-122
- Location: Prairie View
- Existed: June 25, 1952–July 13, 1960

K-122 was a short spur route that served the city of Prairie View in Phillips County. The highway began at US-36 west of Prairie View and ran eastward to the Prairie View city limits. K-122 was assigned in a June 25, 1952, resolution, The highway was removed from the state highway system in a July 13, 1960, resolution, and became a section of a newly rerouted US-36.

== K-130 ==
K-130
- Location: Hartford, Neosho Rapids
- Length: 7.818 mi (12.582 km)
- Existed: 1951–present

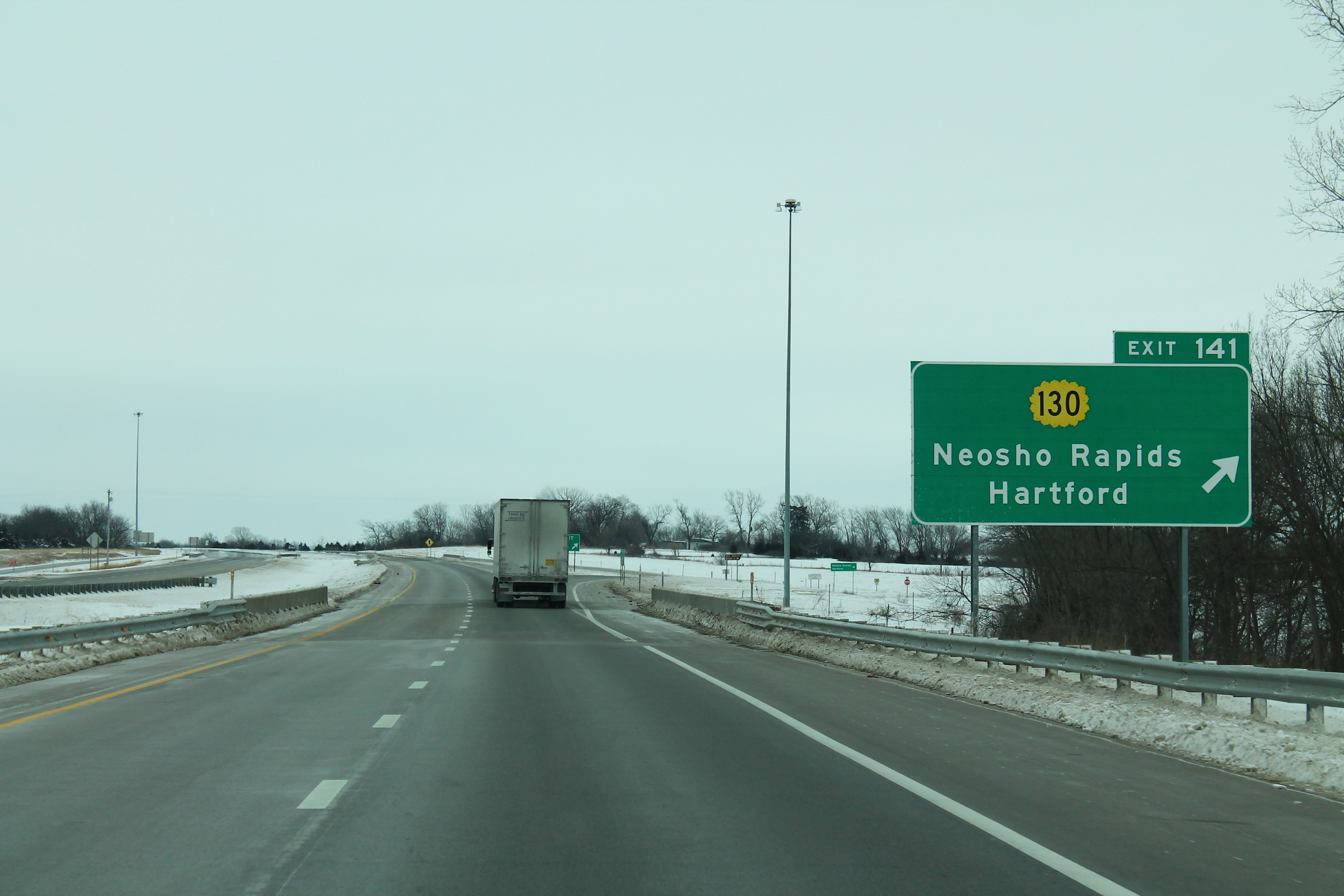
I-35 exit for K-130

K-130 is a 7.818-mile-long (12.582 km) spur route that serves the cities of Hartford and Neosho Rapids in Lyon County. K-130's southern terminus is a continuation as Commercial Street at the Hartford City limits, and the northern terminus is at I-35 and US-50 north of the City of Neosho Rapids. K-130 was originally a section of K-57, but in a 1951 resolution, K-57 was realigned further south. The U.S. Army Corps of Engineers began building the John Redmond Dam on June 18, 1959, and then in 1962 K-130 was realigned slightly between Hartford and to make room for the new reservoir. The dam went into service on November 17, 1964.

== K-131 ==
K-131
- Location: Lebo
- Length: 0.521 mi (838 m)
- Existed: August 24, 1949–present

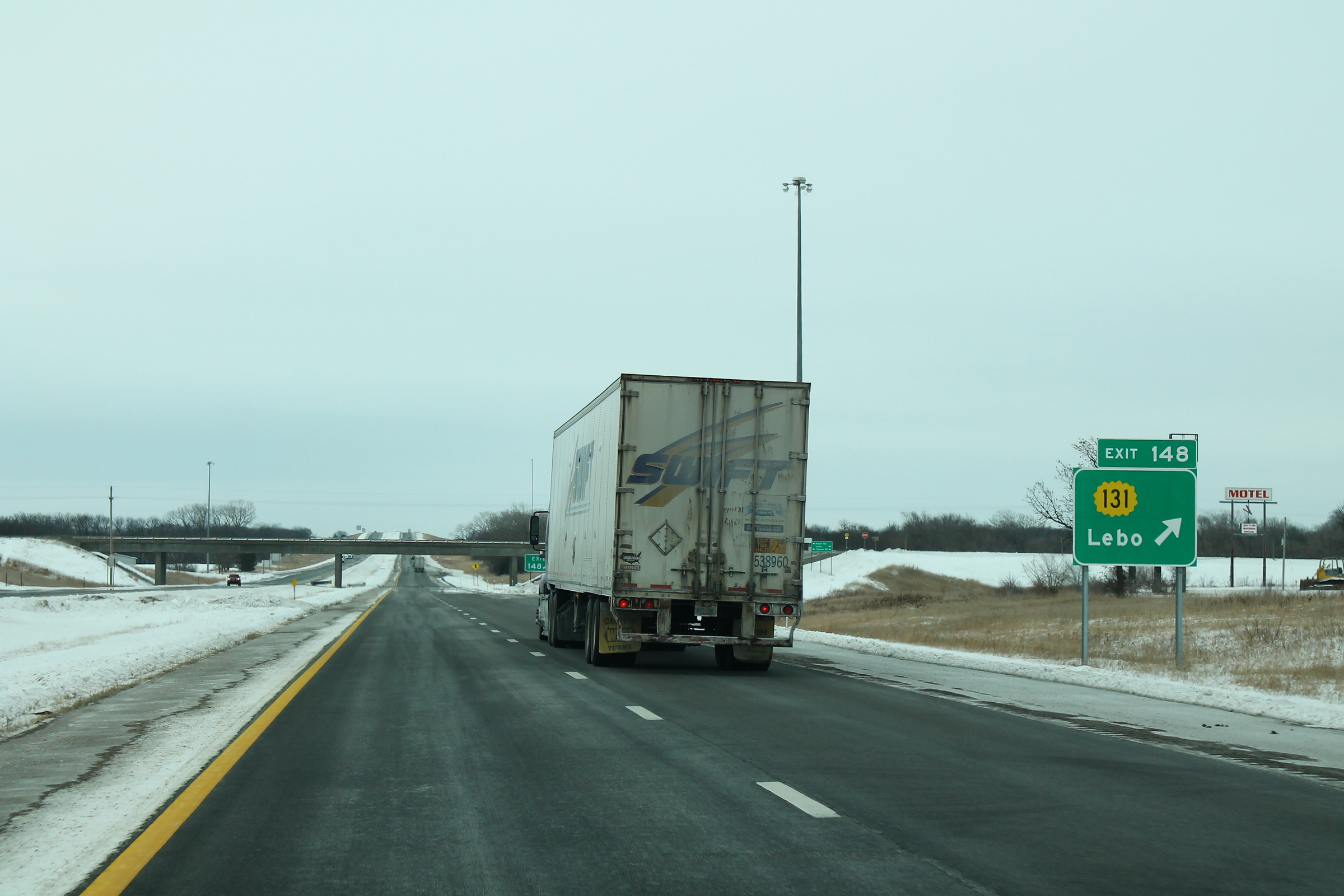
I-35 exit for K-131

K-131 is a 0.521-mile-long (0.838 km) spur route that serves the city of Lebo in northwestern Coffey County. The highway begins at the north city limit between Sixth and Seventh streets, from which the road continues south as Ogden Street. K-131 heads north to a diamond interchange with I-35 and US-50, which run concurrently east–west, between Emporia and Ottawa. The Kansas State Highway Commission accepted K-131 into the state highway system from Coffey County through an August 24, 1949, resolution. The section of highway began at US-50S south of the city and went north 0.560 miles (0.901 km) to Sac and Fox Street and Ogden Street at the south city limit of Lebo. This highway is now named Old Highway 131. On November 14, 1968, the Kansas State Highway Commission approved a lengthy resolution adding and removing several designations in Lyon, Coffey, Osage, and Franklin counties as part of plans to construct I-35 between Emporia and Ottawa. The resolution removed US-50 from its old course and placed it on I-35, and it also changed K-131's route from its southern approach to Lebo to its current northern approach. The change in routing in K-131 and the other highways went into effect in 1973 when I-35 was completed from east of Emporia to Ottawa.

== K-133 ==
K-133
- Location: Dennis
- Length: 0.491 mi (790 m)
- Existed: June 2, 1954–May 3, 1995

K-133 was a 0.491-mile-long (0.790 km) spur route that served the city of Dennis in Labette County. The highway began at US-160 and ran northward to the Dennis city limits. K-133 was assigned in a June 2, 1954, resolution, and the Kansas Department of Transportation removed K-133 from the state highway system in a May 3, 1995, resolution, when a new alignment of US-160 and US-400 was built.

== K-134 ==
K-134
- Location: Bartlett
- Length: 0.231 mi (372 m)
- Existed: April 28, 1954–December 5, 2000

K-134 was a 0.231-mile-long (0.372 km) spur route that served the city of Bartlett in Labette County. The highway began at US-166 and ran northward to the Bartlett city limits. K-134 was assigned in an April 28, 1954, resolution, and the Kansas Department of Transportation removed K-134 from the state highway system in a December 5, 2000, resolution.

== K-136 (1945–1985) ==
K-136
- Location: Iowa and Sac & Fox Mission State Historic Site
- Length: 0.280 mi (451 m)
- Existed: October 9, 1945–October 7, 1985

K-136 was a 0.280-mile-long (0.451 km) spur route that served the Iowa and Sac & Fox Mission State Historic Site in Doniphan County. K-136's southern terminus was at US-36 and the northern terminus was at the Iowa and Sac & Fox Mission. K-136 was assigned in an October 9, 1945, resolution, and removed in an October 7, 1985, resolution.

== K-136 ==
K-136
- Location: Troy
- Length: 0.322 mi (518 m)
- Existed: May 25, 2004–present

K-136 is a 0.400-mile-long (0.644 km) spur route that serves the city of Troy in Doniphan County. K-136's southern terminus is at the Troy city line and the northern terminus is at US-36 north of Troy. K-136 was assigned in a May 25, 2004, resolution, to replace a section of K-7, when it was moved to a new alignment.

== K-137 ==
K-137
- Location: Purcell
- Length: 0.180 mi (290 m)
- Existed: August 13, 1952–present

K-137 is a 0.180-mile-long (0.290 km) spur route that serves the community of Purcell in Doniphan County. K-137's southern terminus is at Purcell and the northern terminus is at K-20 north of Purcell. K-137 was assigned in an August 13, 1952, resolution.

== K-138 ==
K-138
- Location: Paxico
- Length: 1.086 mi (1.748 km)
- Existed: October 8, 1952–present

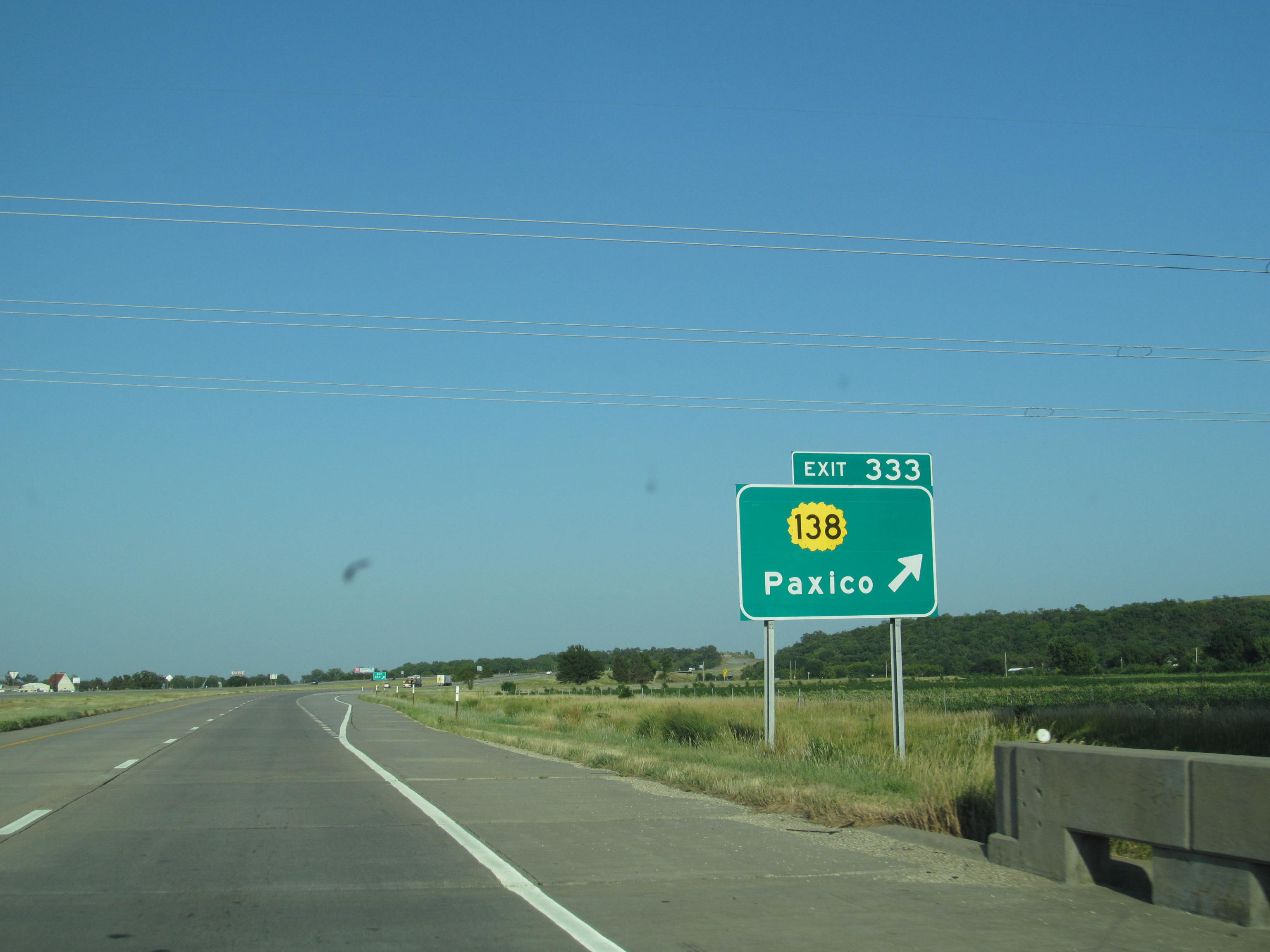
I-70 exit for K-138

K-138 is a 1.086-mile-long (1.748 km) spur route that serves the city of Paxico in central Wabaunsee County. The highway begins at a partial cloverleaf interchange with I-70 and US-40, which run concurrently east–west, between Alma and Maple Hill. K-138 heads east and gradually approaches a Union Pacific Railroad line and then closely parallels the line to the west city limit of Paxico at Newbury Avenue. The Kansas State Highway Commission authorized K-10, which at the time extended west of Lawrence, to be relocated to a new two-lane road between K-99 north of Alma and Maple Hill through an October 29, 1940, resolution. This new highway bypassed K-10's old course west from Paxico when it was completed between 1941 and 1945. The commission accepted K-138 into the state highway system from Wabaunsee County through an October 8, 1952, resolution. K-138 followed K-10's old course for 1.259 miles (2.026 km) between an oblique intersection on a tangent with the contemporary course of K-10 and the city limit of Paxico. K-10 near Paxico was replaced by US-40 between 1953 and 1956. K-138 was put on its present course when it was relocated at its west end to tie into the I-70 interchange when US-40 was upgraded to the Interstate Highway in 1961.

== K-139 ==
K-139
- Location: Cuba
- Length: 1.000 mi (1.609 km)
- Existed: November 24, 1954–present

K-139 is a 1.000-mile-long (1.609 km) spur route that serves the city of Cuba in Republic County. K-139's southern terminus is at Linden Street in Cuba and the northern terminus is at US-36 north of Cuba. K-139 was assigned in a November 24, 1954, resolution.

== K-157 ==
K-157
- Location: Lyon Township
- Length: 3.866 mi (6.222 km)
- Existed: November 14, 1950–present

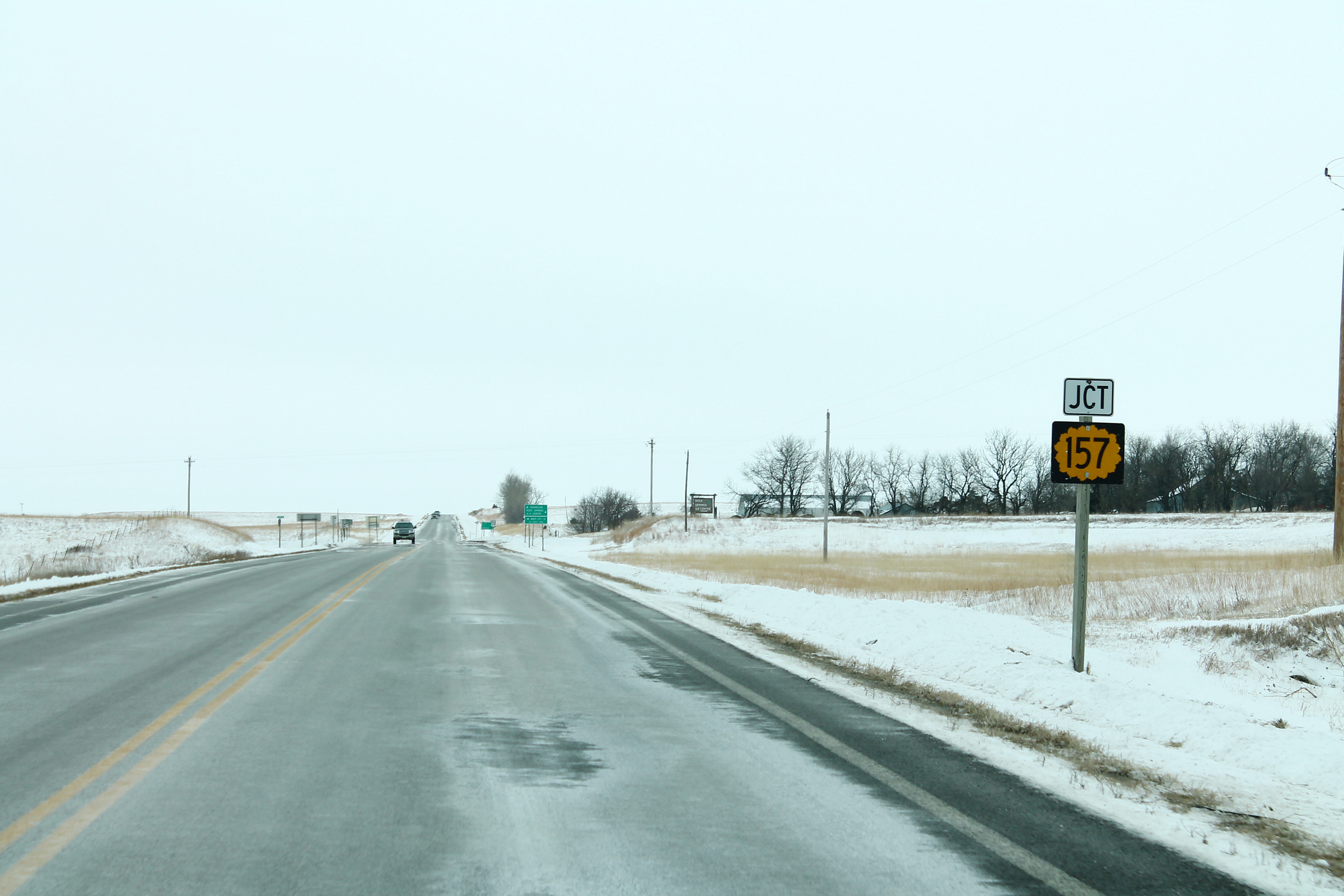
US-77 approaching junction with K-157

K-157 is a 3.866-mile-long (6.222 km) spur route in Lyon Township in southwestern Geary County that serves Rock Springs 4-H Center, a 4-H camp that lies in both Geary and Dickinson counties. The highway begins at the main entrance of Rock Springs 4-H Center just north of the Geary–Dickinson county line. K-157 heads north to the next section line road, then the route curves east and follows the section line road to its eastern terminus at US-77 between Junction City and Herington. The Kansas State Highway Commission proposed a state highway connection between US-77 and Rock Springs 4-H Camp in a May 24, 1950, resolution, and the commission confirmed their decision in a November 14, 1950, resolution. The highway used the north–south segment of modern K-157, but instead of heading east toward modern US-77 north of the camp, the highway headed west to the contemporary course of US-77. The Kansas State Highway Commission approved a relocation of US-77 between Herington and Junction City in a January 6, 1960, resolution. The resolution included designation of a new course for K-157 from north of the 4-H facility to connect with the new course of US-77 and to remove the connection to old US-77. K-157 was assigned to its present course after US-77's relocation was completed in 1961.

== K-162 ==
K-162
- Location: Protection
- Length: 0.265 mi (426 m)
- Existed: 1963–March 3, 1977

K-162 was a 0.265-mile-long (0.426 km) spur route that served the city of Protection in Comanche County. The highway began at US-160 and US-183 ran northward to the Protection city limits. The Kansas Department of Transportation removed K-162 from the state highway system in a March 3, 1977, resolution.

== K-163 ==
K-163
- Location: Garden Plain
- Length: 0.485 mi (781 m)
- Existed: August 10, 1966–June 1, 2013

K-163 was a 0.485-mile-long (0.781 km) spur route that served the city of Garden Plain in Sedgwick County. The highway began at the Garden Plain city limits and ran northward to US-54. K-163 was assigned in an August 10, 1966, resolution, and the Kansas Department of Transportation removed K-163 from the state highway system in a June 1, 2013, resolution.

== K-164 ==
K-164
- Location: Valley Center
- Length: 0.427 mi (687 m)
- Existed: January 27, 1967–June 3, 1985

K-164 was a 0.427-mile-long (0.687 km) spur route that served the city of Valley Center in Sedgwick County. The highway began at North Broadway in Valley Center and ran eastward to I-135, US-81 and K-15. K-164 was assigned in a January 27, 1967, resolution, and the Kansas Department of Transportation removed K-164 from the state highway system in a June 3, 1985, resolution.

== K-165 ==
K-165
- Location: Hesston
- Existed: January 27, 1967–c. 1986

K-165 was a short spur that served the city of Hesston in Harvey County. The highway began at the Hesston city limits and ran northward to I-135 and US-81 north of Hesston. K-164 was assigned in a January 27, 1967, resolution, and the Kansas Department of Transportation removed K-165 from the state highway system between 1986 and 1987.

== K-167 ==
K-167
- Location: Marienthal
- Length: 0.506 mi (814 m)
- Existed: August 27, 1958–present

K-167 is a 0.506-mile-long (0.814 km) spur route that serves the unincorporated village of Marienthal in east central Wichita County. The highway begins at K-96 between Leoti and Scott City. K-167 heads north through a grade crossing of the Kansas and Oklahoma Railroad and terminates at the north end of the village at a county highway equidistant between K-96 and the section line road to the north. The Kansas State Highway Commission accepted K-167 into the state highway system from Wichita County through an August 27, 1958, certification of a September 25, 1957, resolution.

== K-168 ==
K-168
- Location: Lehigh
- Length: 0.527 mi (848 m)
- Existed: March 26, 1969–present

K-168 is a 0.527-mile-long (0.848 km) spur route that serves the city of Lehigh in west central Marion County. The highway begins at US-56 and K-15, which run concurrently east–west, between Canton and Hillsboro. K-168 heads north to the south city limit of Lehigh at Main Street, from which the road continues north as Old K56 Road. K-168 was constructed as part of US-56, which in 1969 passed along the west city limit of Lehigh and intersected K-15 at what is now K-168's southern terminus. The Kansas State Highway Commission authorized a relocation of US-56 to its current course near Lehigh in a March 26, 1969, resolution. As part of the resolution, the portion of bypassed US-56 south of Main Street in Lehigh would be redesignated K-168. The US-56 relocation was completed and K-168 was assigned to its present course in 1970.

== K-171 (1958–2010) ==
K-171
- Location: Bushton
- Length: 0.340 mi (547 m)
- Existed: August 27, 1958–April 7, 2010

K-171 was a 0.340-mile-long (0.547 km) spur route that served the city of Bushton in Rice County. The highway began at the Bushton city limits and ran northward to K-4 north of Bushton. K-171 was assigned in an August 27, 1958, resolution, and the Kansas Department of Transportation removed K-171 from the state highway system in an April 7, 2010, resolution.

== K-172 ==
K-172
- Location: Topeka
- Existed: August 28, 1957–c. 1978

K-172 was a short spur route in the city of Topeka in Shawnee County. The highway began at the Kansas Youth Center and ran eastward to US-40, US-75 Alt. and K-4, which ran concurrent at the time of decommissioning but is now just US-24. K-172 was assigned in an August 28, 1957, resolution, and the Kansas Department of Transportation removed it from the state highway system between 1978 and 1979. The road is now known as NW 25th Street.

== K-173 ==
K-173
- Location: Densmore
- Length: 0.650 mi (1,046 m)
- Existed: March 13, 1956–present

K-173 is a 0.650-mile-long (1.046 km) spur route that serves the unincorporated village of Densmore in southeastern Norton County. The highway begins at an intersection of section line roads in the village. K-173 heads north to its end at K-9 between Edmond and Logan. The village of Densmore had been served directly by K-9 until that highway was relocated to its present course between Edmond and Logan between 1946 and 1948. The Kansas State Highway Commission accepted K-173 into the state highway system from Norton County through a May 23, 1956, certification of March 13, 1956, resolution that recognized the need to restore state highway access to the village of Densmore.

== K-174 ==
K-174
- Location: Melvern
- Existed: 1956–1968

K-174 was a short spur route that served the city of Melvern in Osage County. The highway began at US-75 and K-31 west of Melvern and ran eastward to the Melvern city limits. The Kansas Department of Transportation assigned K-174 in 1956 and removed it from the state highway system in a 1968 resolution.

== K-175 ==
K-175
- Location: Marquette
- Length: 0.500 mi (805 m)
- Existed: 1956–2013

K-175 was a 0.500-mile-long (0.805 km) spur route that served the city of Marquette in northwestern McPherson County. The highway began at an abandoned railroad grade at the north city limit of Marquette. The road continued south as Swedonia Street into the city, which contains the Hans Hanson House and the Kansas Motorcycle Museum. K-175 headed north from the city limit to its end at K-4 between Geneseo and Lindsborg. The Kansas State Highway Commission established the highway through a June 13, 1956, resolution to restore state highway access to Marquette removed when K-4 was relocated to bypass the city between 1953 and 1956. The Kansas Department of Transportation acted to remove K-175 from the state highway system in a September 9, 2009, resolution that mainly concerned relocating several segments of K-61. The removal was effective at the conclusion of "turnback work" to resurface the highway in 2013.

== K-176 ==
K-176
- Location: Lucas
- Existed: 1957–2006

K-176 was a spur route that served the city of Lucas in Russell County. The highway began at the Lucas city limits and ran northward to K-18. The Kansas Department of Transportation removed K-176 from the state highway system in 2006.

== K-178 ==
K-178
- Location: St. Benedict
- Length: 3.513 mi (5.654 km)
- Existed: 1957–present

K-178 is a 3.513-mile-long (5.654 km) spur route that serves the community of St. Benedict in Nemaha County. K-178's southern terminus is at US-36 west of the city of Seneca and the northern terminus is a continuation as 176th Street at Main Street in St. Benedict.

== K-180 ==
K-180
- Location: Alta Vista
- Length: 0.307 mi (494 m)
- Existed: 1956–2001

K-180 was a 0.307-mile-long (0.494 km) spur route that served the city of Alta Vista in Wabaunsee County. The highway began at K-4 south of Alta Vista and ran northward to the Alta Vista city limits. The Kansas Department of Transportation removed K-180 from the state highway system in a December 19, 2001, resolution.

== K-182 ==
K-182
- Location: Bellaire
- Length: 0.914 mi (1,471 m)
- Existed: 1955–present

K-182 is a 0.914-mile-long (1.471 km) spur route that serves the unincorporated village of Bellaire in east central Smith County. The highway begins at US-36 between Smith Center and Lebanon. K-182 heads north and ends at the grade crossing with the Kyle Railroad in the village of Bellaire. The Kansas State Highway Commission accepted K-182 into the state highway system from Smith County through a November 23, 1955, resolution.

== K-184 ==
K-184
- Location: Brewster
- Length: 1.578 mi (2.540 km)
- Existed: 1955–present

K-184 is a 1.578-mile-long (2.540 km) spur route that serves the city of Brewster in Thomas County. K-184's southern terminus is at I-70 and US-24 and the northern terminus is at the Brewster city limits .

== K-185 ==
K-185
- Location: McFarland
- Length: 0.650 mi (1,046 m)
- Existed: 1955–present

K-185 is a 0.650-mile-long (1.046 km) spur route that serves the city of McFarland in north central Wabaunsee County. The highway begins at a section line road within an S-curve at the north city limit, from which the road continues southeast as Main Street. K-185 heads north to its end at a partial cloverleaf interchange with I-70 and US-40, which run concurrently east–west, between Alma and Maple Hill. The Kansas State Highway Commission accepted K-185 into the state highway system from Wabaunsee County through a May 25, 1955, resolution. K-185's northern terminus was originally at K-10, which at the time extended west of Lawrence. The commission had authorized K-10 to be relocated to a new two-lane road between K-99 north of Alma and Maple Hill through an October 29, 1940, resolution. This new highway bypassed K-10's old course through McFarland when it was completed between 1941 and 1945. K-10 near McFarland was replaced by US-40 in 1956. The highway was then upgraded to I-70 in 1961.

== K-186 ==
K-186
- Location: Menlo
- Length: 1.600 mi (2.575 km)
- Existed: 1955–present

K-186 is a 1.600-mile-long (2.575 km) spur route that serves the city of Menlo in Thomas County. K-184's southern terminus is at G Avenue in Menlo and the northern terminus is at US-24 north of Menlo.

== K-188 ==
K-188
- Location: Seguin
- Length: 3.100 mi (4.989 km)
- Existed: 1956–present

K-188 is a 3.100-mile-long (4.989 km) spur route that serves the community of Seguin in Sheridan County. K-188's southern terminus is at the Seguin line and the northern terminus is at US-24 north of Seguin.

== K-189 ==
K-189
- Location: Miltonvale
- Length: 0.915 mi (1,473 m)
- Existed: 1954–present

K-189 is a 0.915-mile-long (1.473 km) spur route that serves the city of Miltonvale in southeastern Cloud County. The highway begins at the south end of East 3rd Street, which forms the east city limit. The road curves west into the city and becomes east–west Ash Avenue. K-189 heads north to its end at US-24 between Glasco and Clay Center. The Kansas State Highway Commission approved a relocation of US-24 from east of US-81 to Miltonvale through a November 24, 1954, resolution. The old routing of US-24 west of Miltonvale would be transferred to county control, and the portion of US-24 from Miltonvale north to the junction of the old and new courses would remain in the state highway system. The US-24 relocation was completed and K-189 was assigned to the connector from US-24 to Miltonvale by 1956.

== K-191 ==
K-191
- Location: Lebanon
- Length: 0.999 mi (1,608 m)
- Existed: 1954–present

K-191 is a 0.999-mile-long (1.608 km) spur route that serves the geographic center of the contiguous United States near Lebanon in east central Smith County. The highway begins at a park with a monument to the site's geographic distinction at the junction of two section line roads. K-191 heads east to its end at US-281, 1 mile (1.6 km) north of the north city limit of Lebanon. The Kansas State Highway Commission accepted K-191 into the state highway system from Smith County through a November 24, 1954, certification of an April 14, 1954, resolution to provide state resources to the ordinary section line road burdened with serving traffic to the geographic site.

== K-193 ==
K-193
- Location: Asherville
- Length: 0.467 mi (752 m)
- Existed: 1954–present

K-193 is a 0.467-mile-long (0.752 km) spur route that serves the unincorporated village of Asherville in east central Mitchell County. The highway begins at an intersection of section line roads in the village. K-193 heads north to its end at US-24 between Beloit and Glasco. The village of Densmore had been served directly by US-24 until that highway was relocated to its present course from west of Asherville to the Mitchell–Cloud county line between 1952 and 1954. The Kansas State Highway Commission approved retaining a section of bypassed US-24 as a new spur route designated K-193 to retain state highway access to the village through a March 24, 1954, resolution.

== K-194 ==
K-194
- Location: Simpson
- Length: 1.580 mi (2.543 km)
- Existed: 1954–present

K-194 is a 1.580-mile-long (2.543 km) spur route that serves the city of Simpson, which lies in east central Mitchell County on the west side of the Mitchell–Cloud county line. The highway begins at the north city limit at the Kyle Railroad and Front Street, from which the road continues south as Mill Street. K-194 heads north along the county line to its end at US-24 between Beloit and Glasco. The Kansas State Highway Commission approved a relocation of US-24 from the Mitchell–Cloud county line east to Glasco through a June 25, 1952, resolution. The portion of US-24 through Simpson, which followed the length of the road along the county line between US-24 and the railroad, would be removed from the state highway system. After the US-24 relocation was completed by early 1954, the commission decided to restore state highway access to Simpson along the former course of US-24 through a March 24, 1954, resolution. The spur to Simpson was designated K-194 between then and 1956.

== K-195 ==
K-195
- Location: Harveyville
- Length: 0.370 mi (595 m)
- Existed: 1954–present

K-195 is a 0.370-mile-long (0.595 km) spur route that serves the city of Harveyville in Wabaunsee County. K-195's southern terminus is at K-31 south of Harveyville and the northern terminus is at Main Street in Harveyville.

== K-197 ==
K-197
- Location: Industry
- Length: 2.000 mi (3.219 km)
- Existed: 1957–present

K-197 is a 2.000-mile-long (3.219 km) spur route that serves the community of Industry in Clay County and Dickinson County. K-197's western terminus is at 1st Road in Industry and the eastern terminus is at K-15 east of Industry.

== K-198 ==
K-198
- Location: Collyer
- Length: 0.811 mi (1,305 m)
- Existed: 1960–present

K-198 is a 0.811-mile-long (1.305 km) spur route that serves the city of Collyer in northwestern Trego County. The highway begins at a diamond interchange with I-70 and US-40, which run concurrently east–west, between Quinter and WaKeeney. K-198 heads north to the next section line road, then the route turns west to its end at Ainslie Street at the south city limit of Collyer, from which the road continues west as Eighth Street. The Kansas State Highway Commission authorized the construction of I-70, the relocation of US-40 onto I-70, and the removal of old US-40 from the state highway system between Collyer and Ogallah via WaKeeney in a February 26, 1958, resolution. That resolution retained the portion of US-40 at Collyer along what is now K-198 and added a north–south connector from old US-40 to I-70. I-70 was completed between Collyer and Ogallah and K-198 was applied to I-70's connector to Collyer by 1960.

== K-199 ==
K-199
- Location: Courtland
- Length: 0.832 mi (1,339 m)
- Existed: 1962–present

K-199 is a 0.832-mile-long (1.339 km) spur route that serves the city of Courtland in west central Republic County. The highway begins at the north city limit, from which the road continues south as Main Street. K-199 heads north to its end at US-36 between Mankato and Scandia. The Kansas State Highway Commission approved a US-36 bypass from west of Formoso in Jewell County east to US-36's present junction with K-199 through a March 28, 1958, resolution. US-36 from the Courtland north city limit to K-199's present northern terminus would be retained as a state highway. K-199 was assigned to the spur route to Courtland after the US-36 project was completed in 1962.

== K-201 ==
K-201
- Location: Stark
- Length: 0.786 mi (1,265 m)
- Existed: 1958–2013

K-201 was a 0.786-mile-long (1.265 km) spur route that served the city of Stark in Neosho County. The highway began at US-59 west of Stark and ran eastward to the Stark city limits. The Kansas Department of Transportation removed K-201 from the state highway system in a June 3, 2013, resolution.

== K-202 ==
K-202
- Location: Savonburg
- Length: 0.698 mi (1,123 m)
- Existed: 1958–2013

K-202 was a 0.698-mile-long (1.123 km) spur route that served the city of Savonburg in Allen County. The highway began at US-59 west of Savonburg and ran eastward to the Savonburg city limits. The Kansas Department of Transportation assigned K-202 in 1958 and removed it from the state highway system in an October 11, 2013 resolution.

== K-203 ==
K-203
- Location: Elsmore
- Length: 0.633 mi (1,019 m)
- Existed: 1958–2013

K-203 was a 0.633-mile-long (1.019 km) spur route that served the city of Elsmore in Allen County. The highway began at US-59 west of Elsmore and ran eastward to Main Street in Elsmore. The Kansas Department of Transportation removed K-203 from the state highway system in an October 11, 2013, resolution.

== K-205 ==
K-205
- Location: Milan
- Length: 0.752 mi (1,210 m)
- Existed: 1959–2014

K-205 was a 0.752-mile-long (1.210 km) spur route that served the city of Milan in Sumner County. The highway began at the Milan city limits and ran northward to US-160. The Kansas Department of Transportation removed K-205 from the state highway system through a January 6, 2014, resolution.

== K-206 ==
K-206
- Location: Chapman
- Length: 0.932 mi (1,500 m)
- Existed: 1958–2015

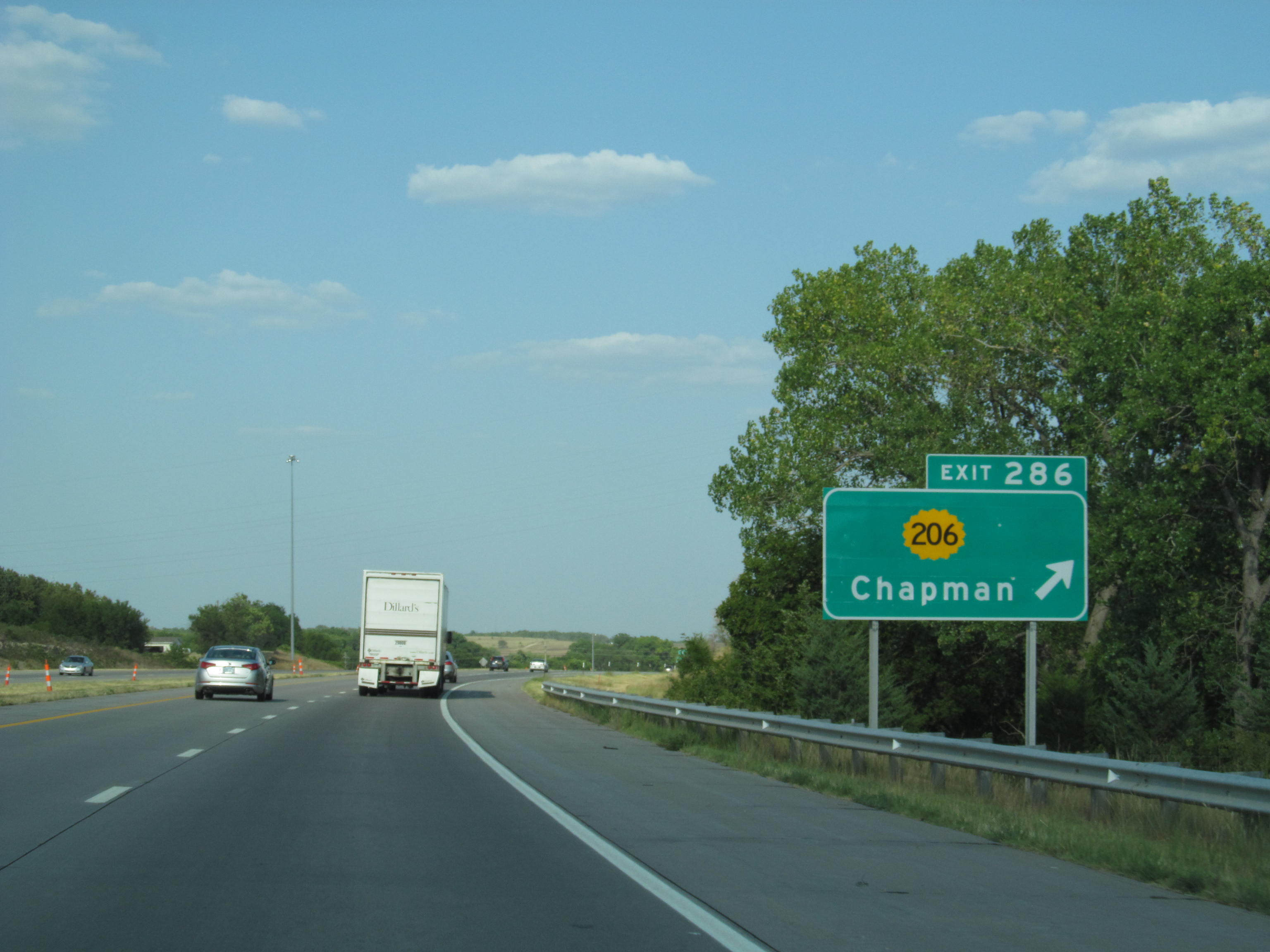
Interstate 70 exit for K-206 taken July 2012

K-206 was a 0.932-mile-long (1.500 km) spur route that served the city of Chapman in Dickinson County. The highway began at the Chapman city limits and ran northward to I-70 and US-40 north of Chapman. The Kansas Department of Transportation removed K-206 from the state highway system in 2015.

== K-209 ==
K-209
- Location: Woodbine
- Length: 2.455 mi (3.951 km)
- Existed: 1961–present

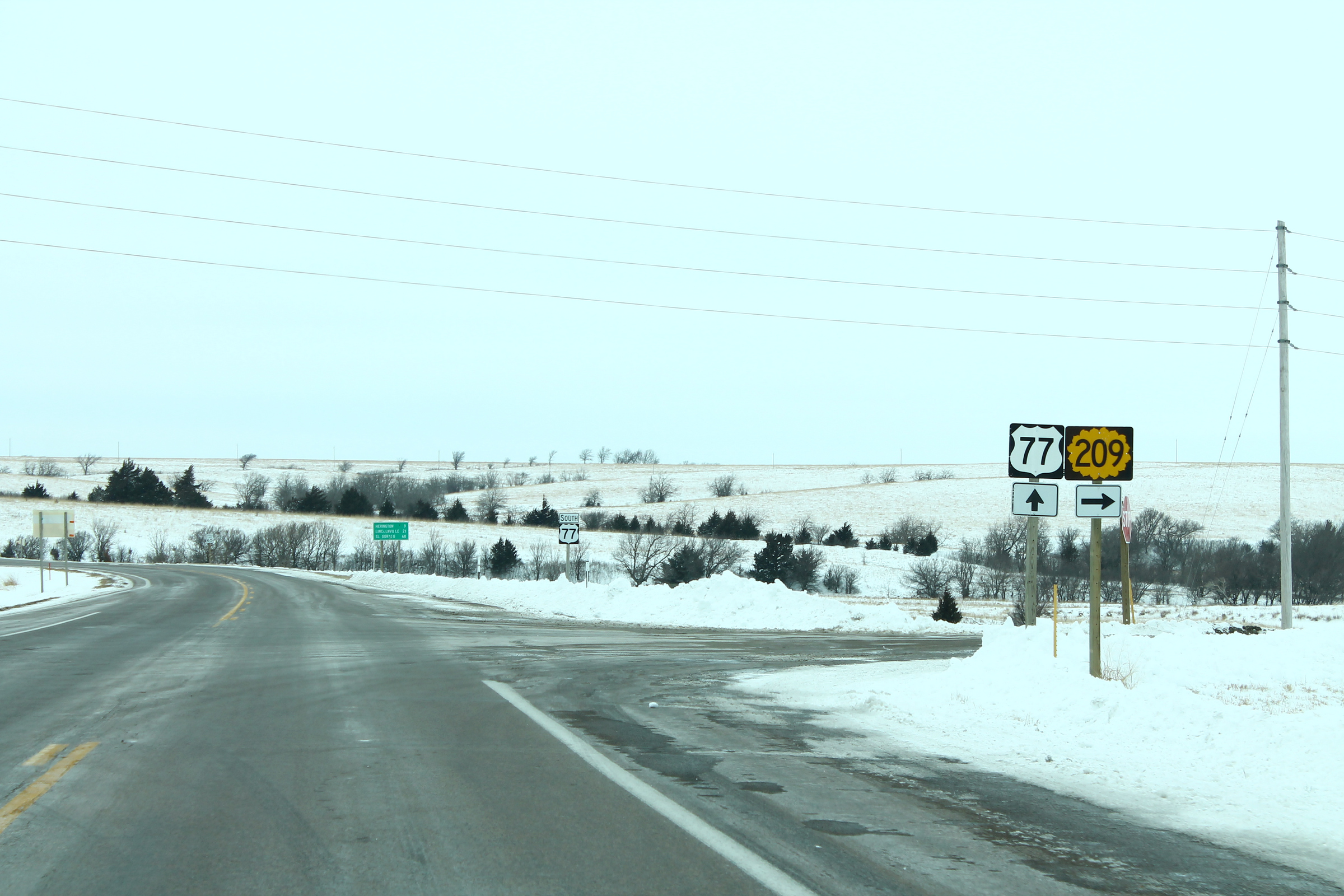
K-209's terminus with US-77

K-209 is a 2.455-mile-long (3.951 km) spur route that serves the city of Woodbine, which lies in east central Dickinson County on the west side of the Dickinson–Morris county line. The highway begins at the northwest corner of the city at the intersection of Western Avenue and Eighth Street, which is also an intersection of orthogonal section line roads. K-209 follows the north city limit through a grade crossing with the heritage Abilene and Smoky Valley Railroad to the northeast corner of the city at Gillett Road. The highway crosses Lyon Creek, intersects Wolf Road, and curves away from and back to the east–west section line the route followed from Woodbine. At the east end of the curve, K-209 crosses the Dickinson–Morris county line, east of which the highway curves southeast to an orthogonal intersection with US-77 between Junction City and Herington. The Kansas State Highway Commission approved a relocation of US-77 between Herington and Junction City in a January 6, 1960, resolution. The old course of US-77 passed along the west and north sides of Woodbine, crossed Lyon Creek, and turned north onto Wolf Road toward Junction City. The resolution stated the old course of US-77 from the northwest corner of Woodbine to Wolf Road would remain in the state highway system, and a new road would be constructed east from Wolf Road to the new course of US-77. Those two segments together became K-209 after US-77's relocation was completed in 1961.

== K-210 ==
K-210
- Location: Argonia
- Length: 0.144 mi (232 m)
- Existed: 1959–2014

K-210 was a 0.144-mile-long (0.232 km) spur route that served the city of Argonia in Sumner County. The highway began at the Argonia city limits and ran northward to US-160. The Kansas Department of Transportation removed K-210 from the state highway system through a January 6, 2014, resolution.

== K-211 ==
K-211
- Location: Park
- Length: 1.035 mi (1.666 km)
- Existed: 1959–present

K-211 is a 1.035-mile-long (1.666 km) state highway in the U.S. state of Kansas. K-211's southern terminus is at I-70 and US-40 southwest of Park, and the northern terminus is at Old US-40 in Park.

== K-212 ==
K-212
- Location: Quinter
- Length: 0.653 mi (1,051 m)
- Existed: 1959–2014

K-212 was a 0.653-mile-long (1.051 km) spur route that served the city of Quinter in Gove County. The highway began at I-70 south of Quinter and ran northward to Main Street in Quinter. The Kansas Department of Transportation removed K-212 from the state highway system in an April 4, 2014, resolution.

== K-215 ==
K-215
- Location: Goessel
- Length: 0.488 mi (785 m)
- Existed: 1951–present

K-215 is a 0.488-mile-long (0.785 km) spur route that serves the city of Goessel in southwestern Marion County. The highway begins at the east city limit at Elm Street, from which the road continues west as Main Street. K-215 passes to the south of the Mennonite Heritage Museum as it heads east to K-15 between Lehigh and Newton. The Kansas State Highway Commission accepted K-215 into the state highway system from Marion County through a September 14, 1951, resolution. The highway originally extended west 1 mile (1.6 km) from K-15 through the then-unincorporated village to the next section line road. On May 28, 1952, the commission passed another resolution in response to the village incorporating since the previous resolution. Since Kansas law stated a state highway could only extend to the city limit of a municipality, the new resolution removed from the state highway system the portion of the highway within the new city limits of Goessel.

== K-216 ==
K-216
- Location: Grinnell
- Length: 0.585 mi (941 m)
- Existed: 1962–present

K-216 is a 0.585-mile-long (0.941 km) spur route that serves the city of Grinnell in northwestern Gove County. The highway begins at a diamond interchange with I-70 and US-40, which run concurrently east–west, between Colby and Grainfield. K-216 heads north to South 6th Street, onto which the highway turns west and ends at the south city limit of Grinnell just east of Adams Street. The Kansas State Highway Commission established K-216 to retain state highway access to Grinnell as part of a September 12, 1962, resolution that authorized the construction of I-70 and the relocation of US-40 onto I-70 from US-40 east of Oakley to Grainfield. I-70 between Oakley and Grainfield was constructed between 1962 and 1965, although K-216 may have been marked as early as 1963.

== K-217 ==
K-217
- Location: Wheeler
- Length: 0.500 mi (805 m)
- Existed: 1959–2014

K-217 was a 0.500-mile-long (0.805 km) spur route that served the city of Wheeler in Cheyenne County. The highway began at US-36 south of Wheeler and ran northward to County Route O in Wheeler. The Kansas Department of Transportation removed K-217 from the state highway system in a March 3, 2014, resolution.

== K-218 ==
K-218
- Location: Herington
- Length: 1.773 mi (2.853 km)
- Existed: 1964–present

K-218 is a 1.773-mile-long (2.853 km) spur route that serves the city of Herington in southeastern Dickinson County. The highway begins at the west city limit just north of Walnut Street, which heads east toward downtown Herington. K-218 intersects a Union Pacific Railroad line and continues north to its end at K-4 between Hope and Latimer. The Kansas State Highway Commission approved a relocation of US-77 between Herington and Junction City in a January 6, 1960, resolution. The old course of US-77 entered Herington from the south along what is now US-56 Business; turned east onto Trapp Street, north onto Broadway Street, and west onto Walnut Street; and left town by turning north onto what is now K-218. The course of K-218 remained in the state highway system after US-77's relocation was completed in 1961. K-218 was assigned to the old piece of US-77 between 1963 and 1965.

== K-219 ==
K-219
- Location: Seward
- Length: 0.995 mi (1,601 m)
- Existed: 1950–2013

K-219 was a 0.995-mile-long (1.601 km) spur route that served the city of Seward in Stafford County. The highway began at K-19 south of Seward and ran northward to the Seward city limits. The Kansas Department of Transportation assigned K-219 in 1950 and removed it from the state highway system in a May 1, 2013, resolution.

== K-220 ==
K-220
- Location: New Cambria
- Existed: 1959–1973

K-220 was a short spur route that served the city of New Cambria in Saline County. The highway began at the New Cambria city limits and ran northward to exit 260 of I-70 and US-40 northeast of New Cambria. The Kansas Department of Transportation removed K-220 from the state highway system in a 1973 resolution.

== K-221 ==
K-221
- Location: Solomon
- Existed: 1959–2013

K-221 was a short spur route that served the city of Solomon in Dickinson County. The highway began at the Solomon city limits and ran northward to I-70 and US-40 north of Solomon. The Kansas Department of Transportation removed K-221 from the state highway system in a 2013 resolution. It is now known as North Poplar Street.

== K-222 (1960–1962) ==
K-222
- Location: Arma
- Length: 0.111 mi (179 m)
- Existed: June 8, 1960–February 14, 1962

K-222 was a 0.111-mile-long (0.179 km) spur route that served the city of Arma in Crawford County. The highway began at US-69 and ran eastward to the Arma city limits. The Kansas Department of Transportation assigned K-222 on June 8, 1960, and removed it from the state highway system in a February 14, 1962, resolution.

== K-222 (1966–2000) ==
K-222
- Location: Mound Valley
- Length: 0.399 mi (642 m)
- Existed: 1966–2000

K-222 was a 0.399-mile-long (0.642 km) spur route that served the city of Mound Valley in Labette County. The highway began at US-160 and ran northward to the Mound Valley city limits. The Kansas Department of Transportation removed K-222 from the state highway system in a December 5, 2000, resolution.

== K-224 ==
K-224
- Location: Humboldt
- Length: 1.039 mi (1.672 km)
- Existed: 1977–2013

K-224 was a 1.039-mile-long (1.672 km) spur route that served the city of Humboldt in Allen County. The highway began at the Humboldt city limits and ran eastward to US-169 east of Humboldt. The Kansas Department of Transportation assigned K-224 in 1977 and removed it from the state highway system in an October 13, 2013, resolution.

== K-228 ==
K-228
- Location: Ionia
- Length: .400 mi (644 m)
- Existed: 1945–present

K-228 is a 0.400-mile-long (644 m) state highway in the U.S. state of Kansas. Located entirely within Jewell County, K-228's western terminus is at K-128 west Ionia and the eastern terminus is a continuation as a locally maintained road at the Ionia city limits. K-228 is not included in the National Highway System, a system of highways important to the nation's defense, economy, and mobility. 2017 Annual average daily traffic (AADT) on K-228 was 70 vehicles per day. K-228 was assigned by the Kansas Department of Transportation (KDOT) on June 20, 1945. K-128 originally ran directly north–south through Ionia until it was moved slightly westward to a new alignment in 1945 and at that time K-228 was created to link Ionia to the new alignment of K-128.

== K-229 ==
K-229
- Location: Haven
- Existed: 1960–1977

K-229 was a short spur route that served the city of Haven in Reno County. The highway began at the former K-96 alignment, now known as Switzer Road, northward to the Haven city limits. The Kansas Department of Transportation removed K-229 from the state highway system through a 1977 resolution. K-229 was decommissioned when K-96 was rerouted to a new alignment.

== K-230 ==
K-230
- Location: Mount Hope
- Existed: 1960–1995

K-230 was a short spur route that served the city of Mount Hope in Sedgwick County. The highway began at the Mount Hope city limits, where it continued as North Ohio Street, and ran northward to K-96. The Kansas Department of Transportation removed K-230 from the state highway system through a 1995 resolution and is now known as North 279th Street West. K-230 was a former section of K-96 before K-96 was rerouted to a new alignment.

== K-231 ==
K-231
- Location: Dorrance
- Existed: 1961–2006

K-231 was a spur route that served the city of Dorrance in Russell County. The highway began at the Dorrance city limits and ran northward to I-70 and US-40 north of Dorrance. The Kansas Department of Transportation removed K-231 from the state highway system in 2006.

== K-233 ==
K-233
- Location: Oketo
- Length: 3.481 mi (5.602 km)
- Existed: 1961–present

K-233, also known as Cherokee Road, is a 3.481-mile-long (5.602 km) state highway located entirely within Marshall County in the U.S. state of Kansas. K-233's western terminus is at US-77 in the community of Lone Elm, and the eastern terminus is a continuation as East Street at the Oketo city limits. Just before the eastern terminus the highway crosses the Big Blue River.

== K-234 ==
K-234
- Location: Hanover
- Length: 0.347 mi (558 m)
- Existed: 1962–present

K-234 is a 0.347-mile-long (0.558 km) spur route that serves the city of Hanover in northeastern Washington County. The highway begins at the east city limit at Highland Street, where the road continues west as North Street. K-234 heads east to K-148 between Barnes and the Nebraska state line. K-234's course was constructed as part of a relocation of K-15E (now K-148) south of Hanover that the Kansas State Highway Commission approved November 18, 1940. K-15E would be removed from Zenith Road from US-36 to Hanover and instead placed on K-148's present course south of what is now K-234 and on K-234's course to enter Hanover from the east instead of the south. This relocation was completed by 1945. The Kansas State Highway Commission authorized a relocation of K-15E north from Hanover on March 8, 1961. This relocation would move K-15E from K-234's present course and Shady Boulevard north from Hanover to K-148's present course. K-234 was established after the K-15E relocation was completed in 1962.

== K-236 ==
K-236
- Location: Oneida
- Length: 1.535 mi (2.470 km)
- Existed: 1961–present

K-236 is a 1.535-mile-long (2.470 km) state highway in the U.S. state of Kansas. K-236's southern terminus is at US-36 south of Oneida, and the northern terminus is a continuation as 5th Street at the Oneida city limits.

== K-237 ==
K-237
- Location: Perry Lake
- Length: 3.351 mi (5.393 km)
- Existed: April 23, 1969–present

K-237 begins at an at-grade intersection with the US-24 expressway in rural Jefferson County, about four miles west of Perry. From that junction, the highway heads in a mostly due-north course until it reaches the entrance to Perry State Park. At that point, the K-237 designation ends, but the road continues along the western edge of Perry Lake, and eventually turns west as a county-maintained road that connects with K-4 on the north edge of Meriden.

== K-238 ==
K-238
- Location: Elwood
- Length: 1.433 mi (2.306 km)
- Existed: 1962–present

K-238 is a 1.433-mile-long (2.306 km) spur route in Elwood in east central Doniphan County. The highway serves Rosecrans Memorial Airport, the joint civilian–military airport for St. Joseph, Missouri, which lies on the opposite side of the Missouri River from Elwood. The airport lies west of the river but is in the state of Missouri; the Kansas–Missouri border follows a chain of oxbow lakes. Traffic from St. Joseph must pass through Kansas and use K-238 to reach the city's airport. K-238 begins at a diamond interchange with US-36 in the city of Elwood between St. Joseph and Wathena. The highway heads north through an S-curve and intersects Roseport Road. K-238 continues north along the west city limit to its end at the Browning Bridge, which crosses the eponymous oxbow lake into Missouri at the south end of the airport. The Missouri River and the state line followed the same meander path prior to the Missouri River basin floods of 1952, before which St. Joseph was connected to its airport on land via Missouri Supplemental Route OO. The 1952 floods created a meander cutoff east of the airport, cutting St. Joseph off from its airport. By 1955, the U.S. Army Corps of Engineers constructed a permanent cutoff channel east of the one caused by the floods. To improve access to the airport, the Kansas State Highway Commission approved the designation and construction of K-238 from US-36, which then followed Roseport Road, north to the Browning Bridge at the state line in a July 12, 1961, resolution. The highway was constructed and marked as K-238 in 1962. US-36 was authorized to be moved to its present freeway in a July 31, 1980, resolution. The resolution also extended K-238 east from its southern terminus along old US-36 through Elwood to its partial cloverleaf interchange with the freeway just west of the U.S. Highway's bridge to St. Joseph. K-238 was authorized to be placed on its present course and removed from Roseport Road through a March 25, 1993, resolution. The diamond interchange at K-238's southern terminus was completed between 1995 and 1997.

== K-241 ==
K-241
- Location: Empire Township
- Existed: 1960–1991

K-241 was a short spur route that served Kanopolis Lake State Park in Ellsworth County. The highway began at Kanopolis Lake State Park and ran eastward to K-141 north of the city of Venango. The Kansas Department of Transportation removed K-241 from the state highway system through a 1991 resolution.

== K-242 ==
K-242
- Location: Pawnee Township
- Existed: 1962–1984

K-242 was a short spur route that served Fort Larned National Historic Site in Pawnee County. The highway began at Fort Larned National Historic Site and ran northward to U.S. Route 156 (US-156). The Kansas Department of Transportation removed K-242 from the state highway system through a 1984 resolution.

== K-243 ==
K-243
- Location: Hollenberg Pony Express Station
- Length: 0.942 mi (1,516 m)
- Existed: 1962–present

K-243 is a 0.942-mile-long (1.516 km) spur route that serves the Hollenberg Pony Express Station near Hanover in northeastern Washington County. The highway begins at K-148 between Barnes and the Nebraska state line. K-243 heads east to Big Bear Road, a section line road that provides access to the Hollenberg Pony Express Station property, also known as the Cottonwood Pony Express Station and Hollenberg Ranch State Park. The Kansas State Highway Commission accepted K-243 into the state highway system from Washington County through a June 13, 1962, certification of an August 23, 1961, resolution. The commission based its actions on a law the Kansas Legislature passed in 1961 that permitted the commission to improve roads to historical sites.

== K-245 ==
K-245
- Location: Meriden
- Length: 0.330 mi (531 m)
- Existed: 1961–2014

K-245 was a 0.330-mile-long (0.531 km) spur route that served the city of Meriden in Jefferson County. The highway began at K-4 south of Meriden and ran northward to Lull Street in Meriden. The Kansas Department of Transportation assigned K-245 in 1961 and removed it from the state highway system in a January 3, 2014, resolution.

== K-246 ==
K-246
- Location: Sabetha–Morill
- Length: 5.572 mi (8.967 km)
- Existed: 1962–present

K-246 is a 5.572-mile-long (8.967 km) state highway in the U.S. state of Kansas. K-246's western terminus is at US-75 in the City of Sabetha, and the northern terminus is a continuation as Roxanna Street at the Morill city limits.

== K-247 ==
K-247
- Location: Ellis
- Length: 0.123 mi (198 m)
- Existed: 1964–present

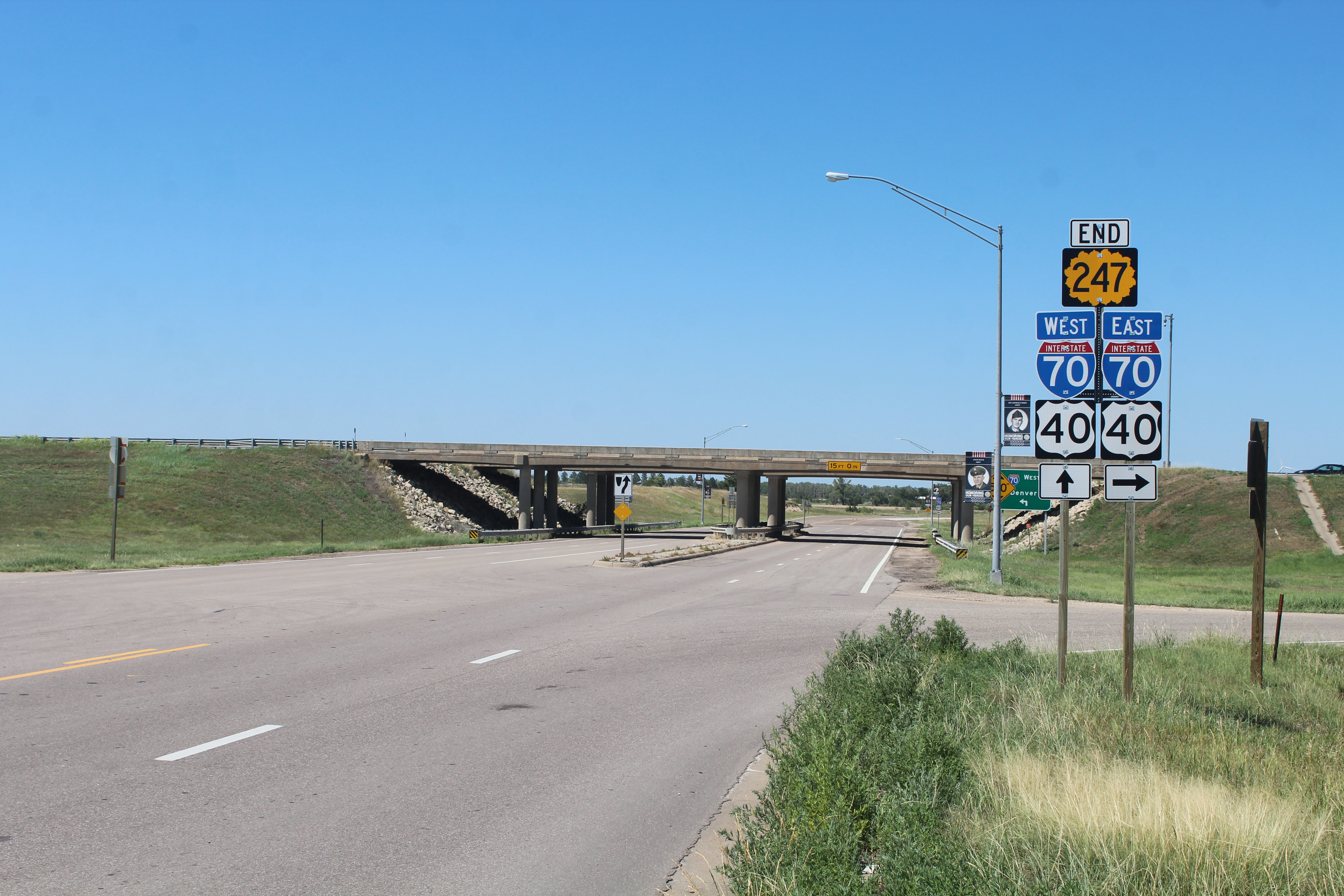
The northern terminus of K-247

K-247 is a 0.123-mile-long (0.198 km) spur route that serves the city of Ellis in western Ellis County. The highway begins at the north city limit of Ellis at 3rd Street, from which the road continues south as Washington Street. K-247 heads north to its end at a diamond interchange with I-70 and US-40, which run concurrently east–west, between WaKeeney and Hays. The Kansas State Highway Commission authorized the construction of I-70, the relocation of US-40 onto I-70, and the removal of old US-40 from the state highway system between Ogallah to the west in Trego County and Hays in an August 14, 1963, resolution. That resolution included a connector with the proposed designation of K-247 between I-70 and Ellis to retain state access to the city that would be removed with the removal of the old route of US-40 from the state highway system. I-70 was completed between Ogallah and Hays and Ogallah and K-247 was applied to I-70's connector to Ellis in 1964.

== K-248 ==
K-248
- Location: Kensington
- Length: 0.997 mi (1,605 m)
- Existed: 1962–present

K-248 is a 0.997-mile-long (1.605 km) spur route that serves the city of Kensington in west central Smith County. The highway begins at 180 Road, a section line road, a little east of that road's bridge over Cedar Creek as the west leg of a wye intersection between east–west 180 Road and the north–south road that is named Main Street within Kensington, whose city limits are a little to the north of the wye. K-248 intersects a Kyle Railroad–operated rail line in the center of town. The highway follows Main Street to its northern terminus at US-36 at the north city limits of Kensington. US-36 heads west toward Agra and east toward Athol. The Kansas State Highway Commission approved a relocation of US-36 from east of Agra in far eastern Phillips County to Kensington through a March 7, 1962, resolution. All of the bypassed routing of US-36, which included the present route of K-248 through Kensington, was planned to be returned to local control. However, on October 24, 1962, the commission passed a resolution retaining the portion of old US-36 north of 180 Road. K-248 was assigned to its course after the US-36 relocation was completed in 1962.

== K-251 ==
K-251
- Location: Cheney Reservoir
- Length: 3.671 mi (5.908 km)
- Existed: 1963–present

K-251 is a 3.671-mile-long (5.908 km) state highway in the U.S. state of Kansas. K-251's southern terminus is at US-54 and US-400 north of Cheney, and the northern terminus is a continuation as County Route 556 (CR 556) by Cheney Reservoir.The northern sector of the highway is inside of Cheney State Park, as well as Morton Township. At the southern terminus is a Diamond interchange.

== K-252 ==
K-252
- Location: Beverly
- Length: 0.453 mi (729 m)
- Existed: 1964–present

K-252 is a 0.453-mile-long (0.729 km) spur route that serves the city of Beverly in east central Lincoln County. The highway begins at the north city limit of Beverly north of 3rd Street, from which the road continues south as Main Street. K-252 heads north to its end at K-18 between Lincoln and Tescott. The Kansas State Highway Commission accepted K-252 into the state highway system from Lincoln County through a May 13, 1964, resolution. The designation restored state highway access to Beverly after K-18 had been removed from Beverly after that highway was relocated between Lincoln and Beverly between 1958 and 1960.

== K-253 ==
K-253
- Location: Edson
- Length: 0.674 mi (1,085 m)
- Existed: 1968–present

K-253 is a 0.674-mile-long (1.085 km) spur route that serves the unincorporated village of Edson in east central Sherman County. The highway begins at a diamond interchange with I-70 and US-24, which run concurrently east–west, between Goodland and Brewster. K-253 heads north to Old U.S. Highway 24, where the highway ends east of the center of Edson. The Kansas State Highway Commission established K-253 to retain state highway access to Edson in an August 10, 1966, resolution. This access was not originally part of plans for the portion of I-70 between the Colorado state line and Levant in Thomas County, as US-24 would have been moved onto I-70 and the old course of US-24 would be removed from the state highway system; these plans had been approved in a June 7, 1966, resolution. K-253 was marked after I-70 was completed from Goodland to Levant in 1968.

== K-255 ==
K-255
- Location: Victoria
- Length: 1.195 mi (1.923 km)
- Existed: 1964–present

K-255 is a 1.195-mile-long (1.923 km) spur route that serves the city of Victoria in eastern Ellis County. The highway begins at the north city limit of Victoria just north of 13th Street, from which the road continues south as Cathedral Street. K-255 heads north to its end at a diamond interchange with I-70 and US-40, which run concurrently east–west, between Hays and Topeka.

== K-257 ==
K-257
- Location: Gorham
- Length: 0.932 mi (1,500 m)
- Existed: 1966–2006

K-257 was a 0.932-mile-long (1.500 km) spur route that served the city of Gorham in west central Russell County. The highway began at a diamond interchange with I-70 and US-40, which run concurrently east–west, between Hays and Russell. K-257 headed north its end at Carrie Street at the south city limit of Gorham, from which the road continued north as Clifford Street. The Kansas State Highway Commission authorized the construction of I-70, the relocation of US-40 onto I-70, and the removal of old US-40 from the state highway system from Hays to east of Russell in a May 13, 1964, resolution. That resolution included a connector between I-70 and Gorham to retain state access to the city that would be removed with the removal of the old route of US-40 from the state highway system. K-257 was assigned to the Gorham connector after I-70 was completed through Russell County in 1966. The Kansas Department of Transportation removed K-257 from the state highway system through an August 24, 2006, resolution.

== K-258 ==
K-258
- Location: Webster Reservoir
- Length: 3.902 mi (6.280 km)
- Existed: 1964–present

K-258 is a 3.902-mile-long (6.280 km) state highway in the U.S. state of Kansas. K-258's southern terminus is a continuation as 10th Terrace by Webster Reservoir, and the northern terminus is at US-24 west of Stockton.

== K-259 ==
K-259
- Location: Onaga
- Length: 0.237 mi (381 m)
- Existed: May 27, 1964–July 8, 1991

K-259 was a 0.237-mile-long (0.381 km) spur route that served the city of Onaga in Pottawatomie County. The highway began at K-16 and ran northward to the Onaga city limits. K-259 was assigned in a May 27, 1964, resolution, and the Kansas Department of Transportation removed K-259 from the state highway system through a July 8, 1991, resolution.

== K-261 ==
K-261
- Location: Prairie Dog State Park
- Length: 1.201 mi (1.933 km)
- Existed: December 2, 1964–present

K-261 is a 1.201-mile-long (1.933 km) state highway in the U.S. state of Kansas. K-261's southern terminus is at Prairie Dog State Park, and the northern terminus is at US-36 and K-383 west of Norton. K-261 was assigned in a December 2, 1964, resolution.

== K-263 ==
K-263
- Location: Paola
- Length: 0.642 mi (1,033 m)
- Existed: June 12, 1969–November 4, 1997

K-263 was a 0.642-mile-long (1.033 km) spur route that served the city of Paola in Jefferson County. The highway began at the Paola city limits and ran eastward to US-169 and K-7 east of Paola. The Kansas Department of Transportation assigned K-263 in a June 12, 1969, resolution, and removed it from the state highway system in a November 4, 1997, resolution.

== K-264 ==
K-264
- Location: Larned
- Length: 1.033 mi (1.662 km)
- Existed: c. 1965–present

K-264 is a 1.033-mile-long (1.662 km) spur route that serves Larned State Hospital west of Larned in central Pawnee County. The highway begins at a T-intersection northwest of the psychiatric hospital within the state complex, which also includes the Larned Correctional Mental Health Facility and the Larned Juvenile Correctional Facility of the Kansas Department of Corrections. K-264 heads north out of the state reservation through an S-curve to its north end at K-156 between Larned and Burdett. The Kansas State Highway Commission authorized constructing K-264 through an August 11, 1965, resolution. Because the route served a state institution, the spur highway was exempt from the 10,000-mile (16,093 km) state highway system limitation. K-264 was completed between 1965 and 1968.

== K-265 ==
K-265
- Location: Leonardville
- Existed: yes

K-265 was a spur route that was proposed to serve the city of Leonardville in Riley County. The highway was to begin at the Leonardville city limits and run northward to US-24. The Kansas Department of Transportation proposed on March 17, 1965, that US-24 be moved to a new alignment north of Leonardville and that K-265 follow the old US-24 alignment north to the new one. K-265 was never built as US-24 was never rerouted.

== K-266 ==
K-266
- Location: Pawnee Indian Museum State Historic Site
- Length: 7.541 mi (12.136 km)
- Existed: 1967–present

K-266 is a 7.541-mile-long (12.136 km) state highway located entirely within Republic County in the U.S. state of Kansas. K-266's southern terminus is at US-36 west of the City of Scandia, and the northern terminus is at Pawnee Indian Museum State Historic Site.

== K-267 ==
K-267
- Location: Kanorado
- Length: 0.837 mi (1,347 m)
- Existed: 1969–present

K-267 is a 0.837-mile-long (1.347 km) spur route that serves the city of Kanorado in west central Sherman County near the Colorado state line. The highway begins at a diamond interchange with I-70 and US-24, which run concurrently east–west, between Goodland and Burlington, Colorado. K-267 heads north to Old U.S. Highway 24, onto which the highway turns west to parallel the Kyle Railroad line. The highway ends at Eastern Avenue at the east city limit of Kanorado, from which Old U.S. Highway 24 continues west through a corner of Kanorado to the Colorado state line. The Kansas State Highway Commission approved plans for the portion of I-70 between the Colorado state line and Levant in Thomas County through a June 7, 1966, resolution. As part of these plans, US-24 would have been moved onto I-70 and almost all of the old course of US-24 would be removed from the state highway system. However, the portion of old US-24 from Eastern Avenue to the next section line road joined the portion of that road between old US-24 and I-70 as part of the new K-267. K-267 was marked when I-70 was completed from Goodland to the Colorado state line in late 1969.

== K-271 ==
K-271
- Location: Mayfield
- Length: 0.657 mi (1,057 m)
- Existed: 1967–2014

K-271 was a 0.657-mile-long (1.057 km) spur route that served the city of Mayfield in Sumner County. The highway began at the Mayfield city limits and ran northward to US-160. The Kansas Department of Transportation removed K-271 from the state highway system through a January 6, 2014, resolution.

== K-272 ==
K-272
- Location: Salina
- Length: 1.019 mi (1.640 km)
- Existed: January 22, 1969–November 11, 1971

K-272 was a 1.019-mile-long (1.640 km) spur route that served the Salina Municipal Airport in the city of Salina in Saline County. The highway began at the Salina Municipal Airport and ran eastward to US-81. The Kansas Department of Transportation designated K-272 on January 22, 1969, and removed it from the state highway system through a November 11, 1971, resolution.

== K-273 ==
K-273
- Location: Williamsburg
- Length: 0.438 mi (705 m)
- Existed: November 14, 1968–September 30, 2002

K-273 was a 0.438-mile-long (0.705 km) spur route that served the city of Williamsburg in Franklin County. The highway began at the Williamsburg city limits and ran northward to I-35 and US-50. The Kansas Department of Transportation assigned K-273 in a November 14, 1968, resolution, and then removed it from the state highway system through a September 30, 2002, resolution.

== K-274 ==
K-274
- Location: Hays
- Length: 0.416 mi (669 m)
- Existed: December 23, 1969–November 9, 2009

K-274 was a 0.416-mile-long (0.669 km) spur route in the city of Hays in Ellis County. The highway began at Fort Hays branch of Kansas Agricultural Experiment Station and ran northward to US-183 Bypass. The Kansas Department of Transportation assigned K-274 in a December 23, 1969, resolution, and removed it from the state highway system in a November 9, 2009, resolution.

== K-276 ==
K-276
- Location: Olivet
- Length: 1.384 mi (2.227 km)
- Existed: September 9, 1970–present

K-276 is a 1.384-mile-long (2.227 km) state highway in the U.S. state of Kansas. K-276's western terminus is a continuation as D Avenue at the Olivet city limits, and the eastern terminus is at US-75 east of Olivet.

== K-277 ==
K-277
- Location: North of Farlington
- Length: 0.710 mi (1,143 m)
- Existed: April 24, 1992–June 1, 2013

K-277 was a 0.710-mile-long (1.143 km) spur route that served the city of Farlington in Crawford County. The highway began at K-7 north of Farlington and ran eastward to Farlington Lake. The Kansas Department of Transportation assigned K-277 in an April 24, 1992, resolution, and removed it from the state highway system in a June 1, 2013, resolution.

== K-278 ==
K-278
- Location: Eisenhower State Park
- Length: 2.988 mi (4.809 km)
- Existed: September 9, 1970–present

K-278 is a 2.988-mile-long (4.809 km) state highway located entirely within Osage County in the U.S. state of Kansas. K-278's western terminus is a continuation as West 293rd Street at the end of state maintenance by the entrance to Eisenhower State Park, and the eastern terminus is at US-75 and K-278 northwest of the City of Melvern.

== K-279 ==
K-279
- Location: Osawatomie
- Length: 0.489 mi (787 m)
- Existed: 1972–present

K-279 is a 0.489-mile-long (0.787 km) spur route that serves Osawatomie State Hospital in the city of Osawatomie in southwestern Miami County. The highway begins at Osawatomie Road at the eastern entrance to the psychiatric hospital grounds. K-279 heads east, passing out of and back into the Osawatomie city limits, to a diamond interchange with US-169 and K-7, which run concurrently along the freeway bypass of Osawatomie, between Paola and Garnett. K-279 was established as the route number for a new connector between the US-169 bypass and Osawatomie State Hospital in the same July 19, 1972, resolution in which the Kansas State Highway Commission approved constructing the bypass. The highway was constructed to retain state highway access to the state hospital after US-169 was removed from Old Kansas City Road. Because the route served a state institution, K-279 was exempt from the 10,000-mile (16,093 km) state highway system limitation. The US-169 bypass, K-279, and their interchange opened between 1975 and 1977.

== K-284 ==
K-284
- Location: Barnard
- Length: 5.618 mi (9.041 km)
- Existed: 1973–present

K-284 is a 5.618-mile-long (9.041 km) spur route that serves the city of Barnard in north central Lincoln County.

== K-285 ==
K-285
- Location: De Soto
- Length: 0.218 mi (351 m)
- Existed: 1977–c. 1999

K-285 was a 0.218-mile-long (0.351 km) spur route that served the city of De Soto in northwestern Johnson County. The highway began at a partial cloverleaf interchange with K-10 between Shawnee and Eudora. K-285 headed north to the south city limit of De Soto, from which the highway continued north along Lexington Avenue. The Kansas State Highway Commission authorized the relocation of K-10 onto its freeway between De Soto and K-7 and the removal of old K-10 from the state highway system in a June 15, 1972, resolution. The 0.607-mile-long (0.977 km) portion of old K-10 from the freeway to the south city limit of De Soto would be retained and designated K-285. K-285 replaced the piece of K-10 north of the freeway when the K-10 freeway was completed between 1975 and 1977. In 1977, the city of De Soto expanded its limits southward; thus, the Kansas Department of Transportation removed the 0.389-mile-long (0.626 km) portion of K-285 between the old and new south city limit from the state highway system in a January 26, 1977, resolution. The resolution also stated any further annexation of the land under K-285 would automatically result in the relevant length of road being transferred to local control. The city of De Soto activated this provision of the resolution, thus removing K-285 from the state highway system, when the city annexed the remainder of the land under K-285 between 1997 and 1999.

== K-368 ==
K-368
- Location: Vassar
- Length: 1.000 mi (1.609 km)
- Existed: November 14, 1962–present

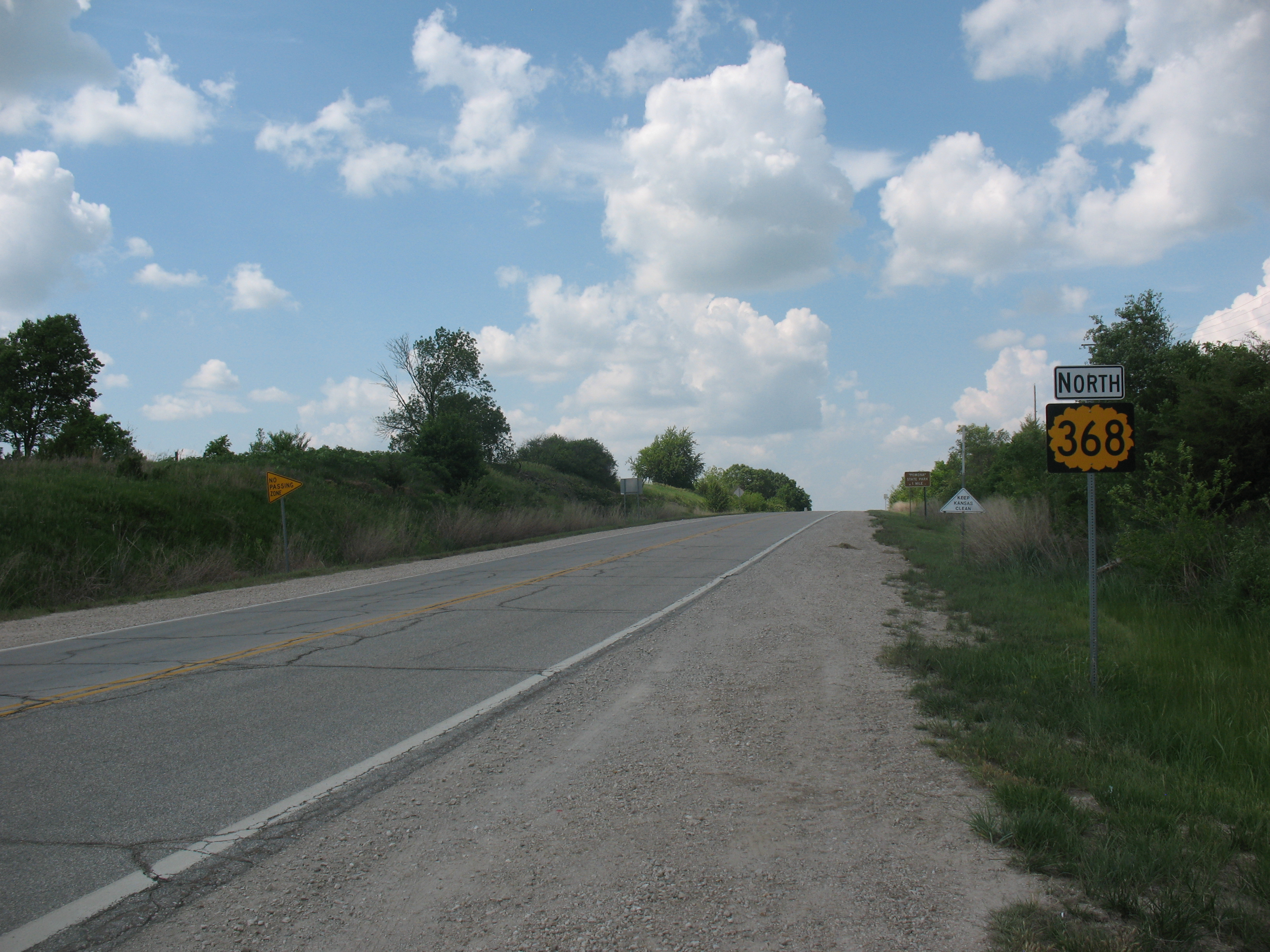
K-368 Northbound from its Southern terminus with K-268

K-368 is a 1.000-mile-long (1.609 km) spur route that serves Pomona State Park near Vassar in east central Osage County. The highway begins at K-268 between Lyndon and Quenemo. K-368 heads north and intersects the Flint Hills Nature Trail, a rail trail along a former Missouri Pacific Railroad line, before reaching its north end at the entrance to Pomona State Park. The U.S. Army Corps of Engineers began to construct Pomona Dam and its associated reservoir in the early 1960s. The federal agency agreed to relocate several county highways that would be displaced by the reservoir, and the Kansas State Highway Commission requested a pair of those highways–an east–west highway between US-75 and K-68 and an access road to the recreational land around the reservoir—be constructed to state highway standards. The commission designated those highways K-268 and K-368, respectively, in a November 14, 1962, resolution. K-268 and K-368 were constructed and added to the state highway system and Pomona Reservoir was completed between 1963 and 1965.
