= Kingsdon =

Kingsdon may refer to:

- Kingsdon, Devon
- Kingsdon, Somerset

== See also ==
- Kingsdown (disambiguation)
