= Clark County State Lake =

Man-made lake in Kansas, United States

- Location within Kansas Clark County State Lake (the United States)
- Location: Appleton Township, Kansas
- Coordinates: 37°23′08″N 99°46′53″W
- Type: Reservoir
- Primary inflows: Bluff Creek
- Primary outflows: Bluff Creek
- Basin countries: United States
- Surface elevation: 2,251 ft (686 m)

Clark County State Lake is a reservoir located in Appleton Township, Clark County in the U.S. State of Kansas. The lake is accessed by Route K-94.
