= Hollenberg Pony Express Station =

- U.S. National Register of Historic Places
- U.S. National Historic Landmark
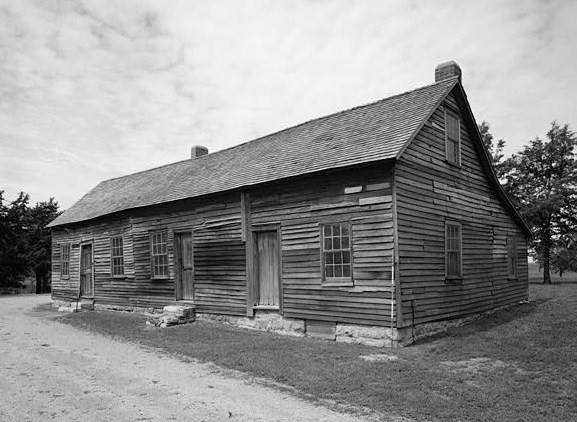
- Hollenberg Pony Express Station in 1991

- Location within Kansas Location within the United States
- Nearest city: Hanover, Kansas
- Coordinates: 39°54′3″N 96°50′37″W
- Area: 6 acres (2.4 ha)
- Built: 1860
- Architect: G.H. Hollenberg
- NRHP reference No.: 66000352

Significant dates
- Added to NRHP: October 15, 1966
- Designated NHL: November 5, 1961

The Hollenberg Pony Express Station, also known as Cottonwood Pony Express Station, is the most intact surviving station of the Pony Express in the United States. It was built by Gerat H. Hollenberg in 1858, to serve travelers on the Oregon and California Trails, and was used by the Pony Express when it was established in 1860. The station is owned by the state of Kansas and is operated by the Kansas Historical Society as Hollenberg Pony Express Station State Historic Site. It was designated a National Historic Landmark in 1961.

== Description and history ==
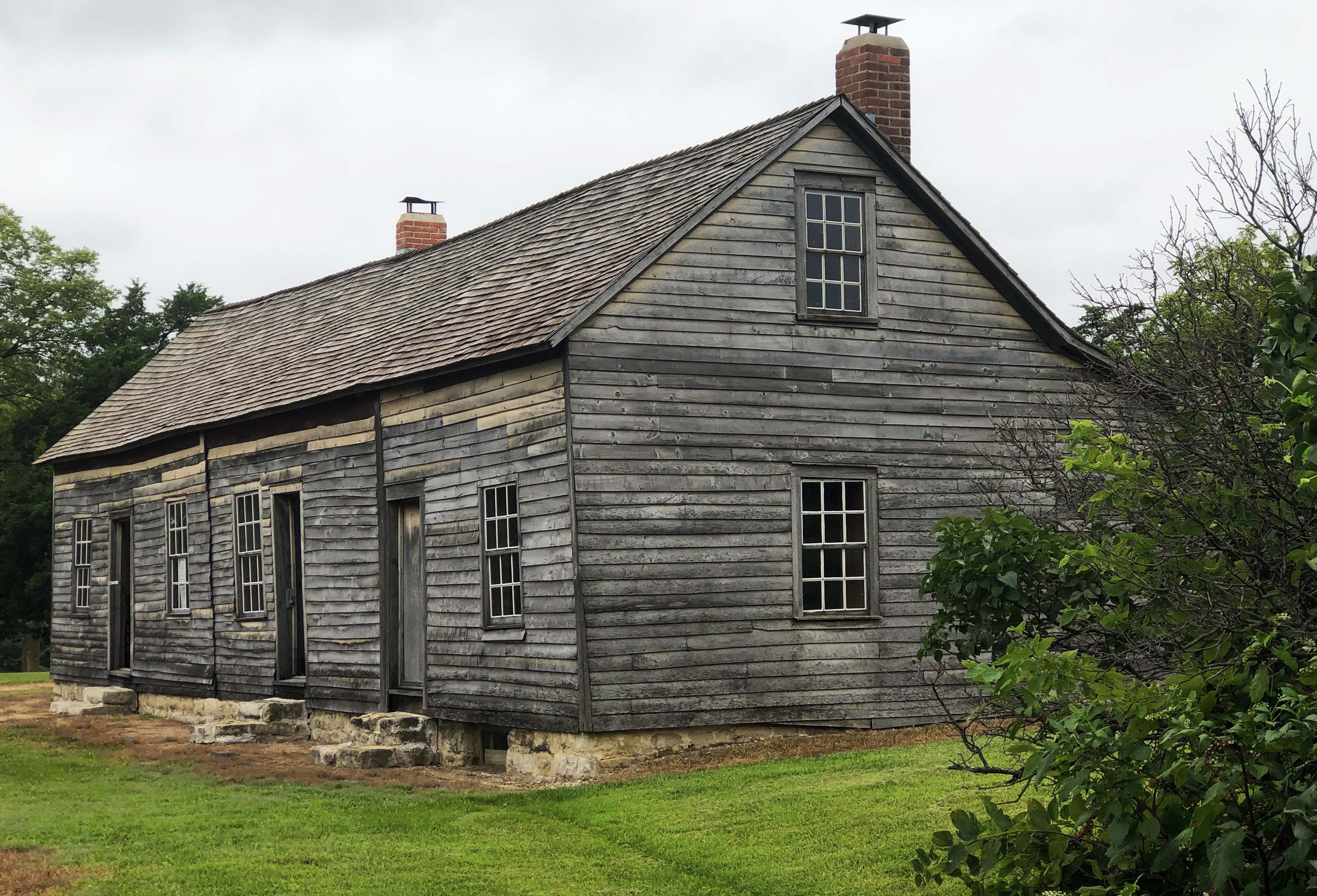
Hollenberg Home Station, 2019

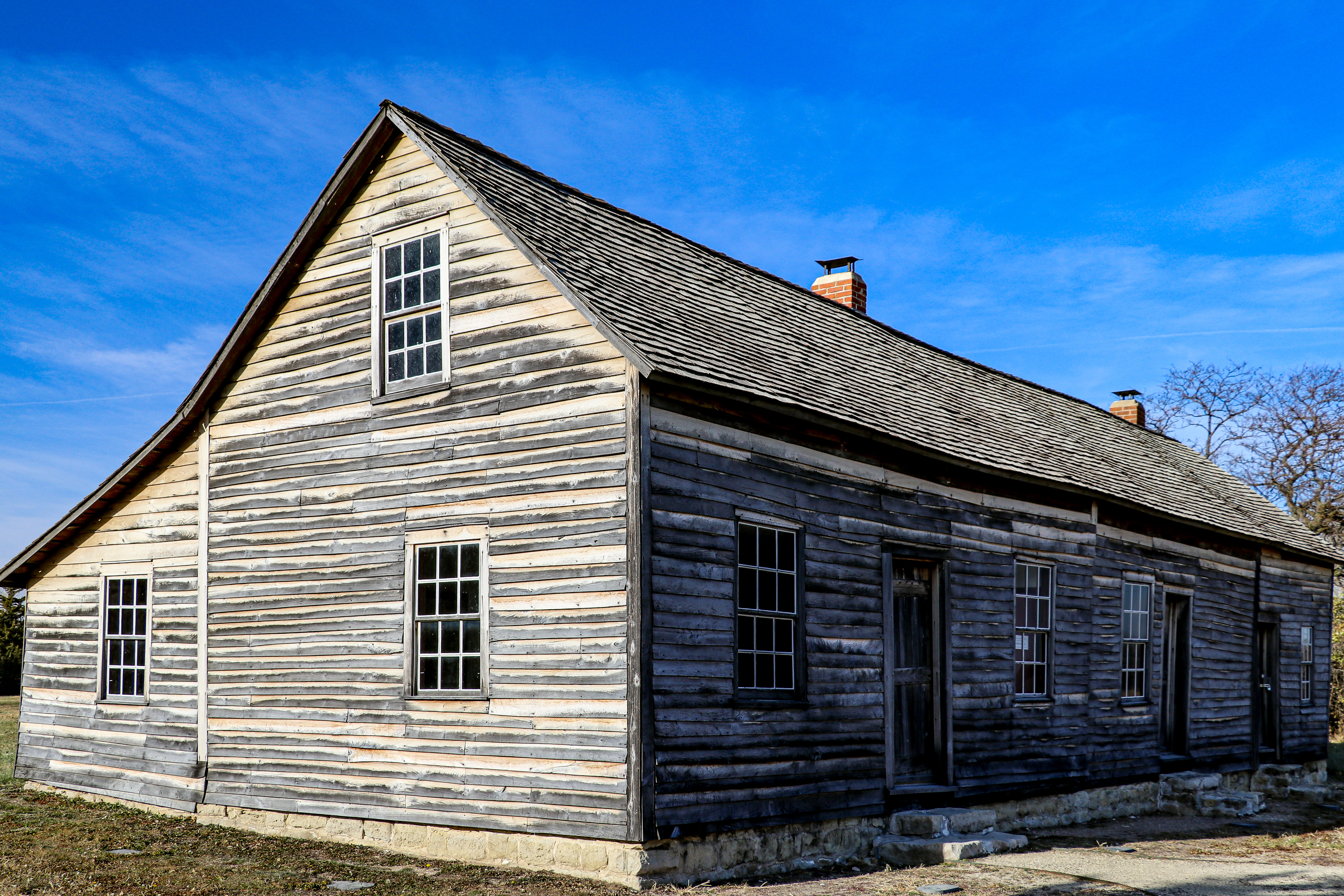

The Hollenberg Pony Express Station is located about 2 miles (3.2 km) east of Hanover, Kansas along Kansas Highway 243. The station consists of a 1 1/2-story rectangular Cottonwood frame building, with a gabled roof, wooden shingled exterior, and stone foundation. The building is organized into six rooms, four of which served as the Hollenberg family residence, one served as a shop, and the last as a bar and tavern space. The loft area served as a sleeping area for riders of the Pony Express and guests. The building was historically accompanied by a stable and blacksmith's shop.

The station was built in 1858 by Gerat H. Hollenberg c. 1857 or 1858, as a way station on the Oregon and California migrant trails. When the Pony Express service was inaugurated, it was made a "home station" where riders switched mounts. The Pony Express operated for only 18 months, ending service in October 1861. The station also served the Butterfield Overland Mail. Hollenberg traded with emigrants on the trails, operated the westernmost Pony Express station in Kansas, and provided relay services for the Overland Mail. The building has never been moved and retains its original dimensions. Hollenberg prospered, establishing the town of Hanover, Kansas and winning election to the Kansas Legislature.

Hollenberg died in 1874, and thereafter the property was used as a farmstead until 1941. It was purchased by the state in that year, and turned over the state historical society for maintenance and management in 1963. The site is open between March and October.

== See also ==
- List of National Historic Landmarks in Kansas
- National Register of Historic Places listings in Washington County, Kansas
