= Kingsdown =

Kingsdown may refer to:

== Places ==
England

- Kingsdown, Bristol, a suburb
- Kingsdown, Dover, a village in east Kent
- West Kingsdown, north Kent
- Kingsdown, Swale, a hamlet on the North Downs in Kent
- Kingsdown, Swindon, a suburb of Swindon in Wiltshire
- Kingsdown, Box, a hamlet in Wiltshire

United States

- Kingsdown, Kansas

== People ==
- Thomas Pemberton Leigh, 1st Baron Kingsdown, a hereditary peer of England
- Robin Leigh-Pemberton, Baron Kingsdown, a life peer of England

== See also ==
- Kingsdown Camp, a hill fort in Somerset, England
- Kingsdown School, in Swindon, England
