= Stuttgart, Kansas =

Unincorporated community in Phillips County, Kansas

- CDP
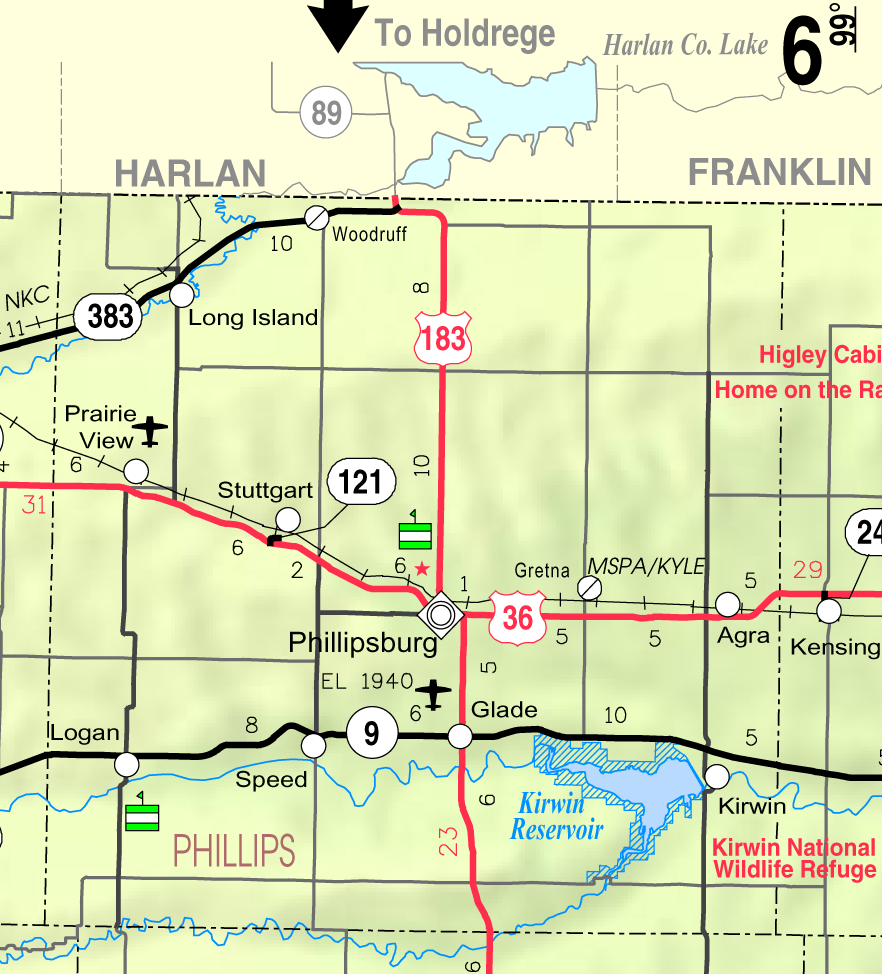
- KDOT map of Phillips County (legend)

- Location within Kansas Location within the United States
- Coordinates: 39.7994535°N 99.4553798°W
- Country: United States
- State: Kansas
- County: Phillips
- Founded: 1888
- Elevation: 1,998 ft (609 m)

Population (2020)
  - Total: 44
- Time zone: UTC-6 (CST)
  - Summer (DST): UTC-5 (CDT)
- Area code: 785
- FIPS code: 20-68750
- GNIS ID: 471923

Stuttgart is a census-designated place (CDP) in Phillips County, Kansas, United States. As of the 2020 census, the population was 44. It lies in northern Kansas at U.S. Route 36 between Prairie View and Phillipsburg.

== History ==
Stuttgart was established by settlers in the early 1870s and grew to have two Lutheran churches, a public school, hotel, cafe, bank, cinema, hairdresser, wood yard, grocer's shop, railway depot, grain silo, repair shop, blacksmith, dairy, and more. It was founded on February 6, 1888. A post office was opened in Stuttgart in 1888, and remained in operation until it closed in 1986.

Today there is a Lutheran church, grain elevator, garage, and a gas station.

== Demographics ==
Historical population
Census	Pop.	Note	%±
2020	44		—
U.S. Decennial Census
