= Vassar, Kansas =

- CDP
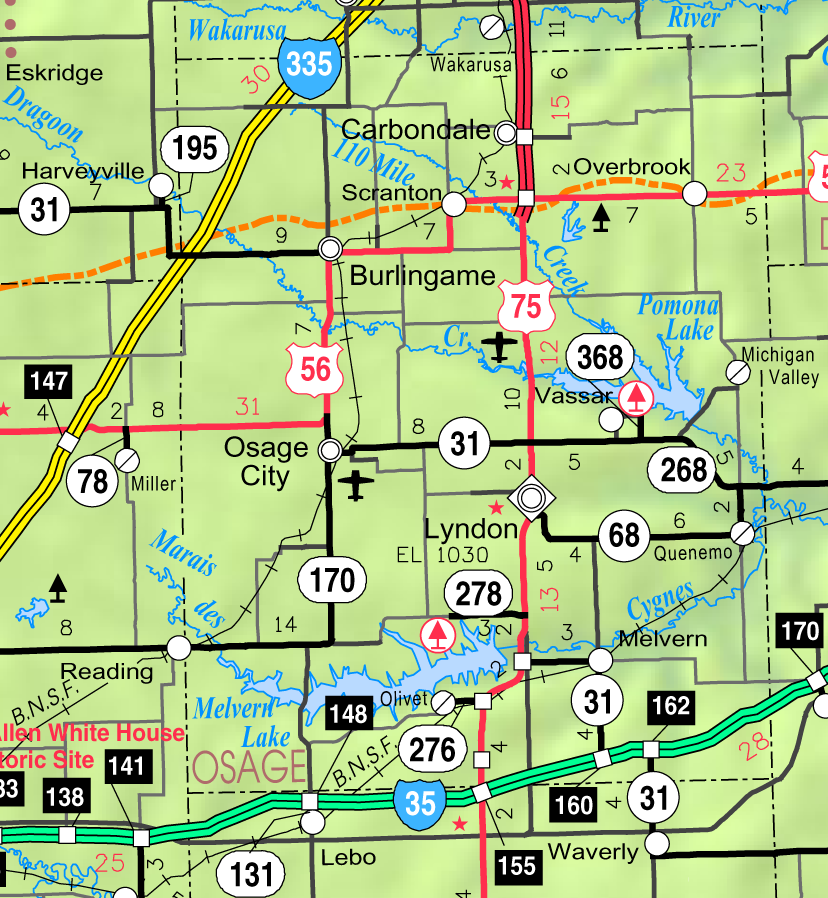
- KDOT map of Osage County (legend)

- Location within Kansas Location within the United States
- Coordinates: 38°38′50″N 95°37′21″W
- Country: United States
- State: Kansas
- County: Osage
- Elevation: 1,106 ft (337 m)

Population (2020)
  - Total: 584
- Time zone: UTC-6 (CST)
  - Summer (DST): UTC-5 (CDT)
- ZIP Code: 66543
- Area code: 785
- FIPS code: 20-73450
- GNIS ID: 479316

Vassar is a census-designated place (CDP) in Osage County, Kansas, United States. As of the 2020 census, the population was 584. It is located 4 miles (6.4 km) northeast of Lyndon, also about half a mile south of Pomona Lake.

== History ==
A post office was opened in La Mont's Hill (an extinct town) in 1871, but it was moved to Vassar in 1887. Vassar has ZIP Code 66543.

The Missouri Pacific Railroad previously went through Vassar, but it was abandoned, then later it was converted into the Flint Hills Nature Trail.

== Geography ==
=== Climate ===
The climate in this area is characterized by hot, humid summers and generally mild to cool winters. According to the Köppen Climate Classification system, Vassar has a humid subtropical climate, abbreviated "Cfa" on climate maps.

== Demographics ==
Historical population
Census	Pop.	Note	%±
2020	584		—
U.S. Decennial Census
