= Prairie View, Kansas =

City in Phillips County, Kansas

- City
- Location within Phillips County and Kansas

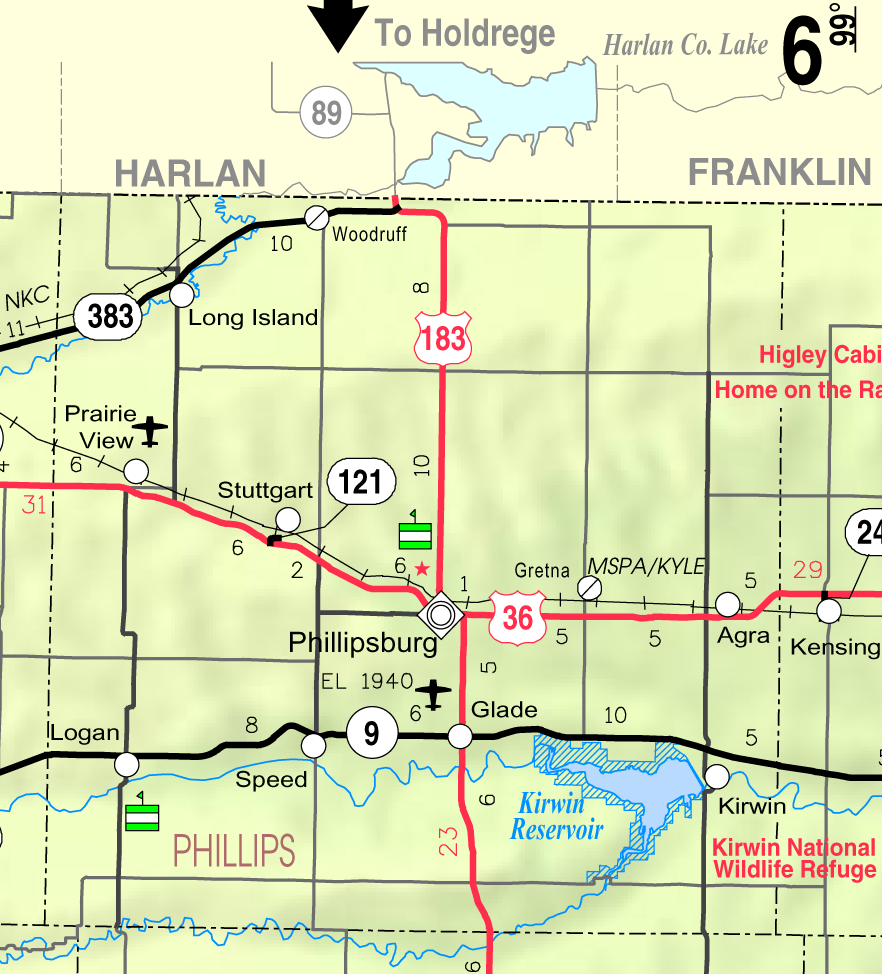
- KDOT map of Phillips County (legend)
- Coordinates: 39°49′55″N 99°34′24″W
- Country: United States
- State: Kansas
- County: Phillips
- Founded: 1870s
- Incorporated: 1905

Area
  - Total: 0.15 sq mi (0.38 km^{2})
  - Land: 0.15 sq mi (0.38 km^{2})
  - Water: 0 sq mi (0.00 km^{2})
- Elevation: 2,192 ft (668 m)

Population (2020)
  - Total: 106
  - Density: 720/sq mi (280/km^{2})
- Time zone: UTC-6 (CST)
  - Summer (DST): UTC-5 (CDT)
- ZIP Code: 67664
- Area code: 785
- FIPS code: 20-57525
- GNIS ID: 2396268

Prairie View is a city in Phillips County, Kansas, United States. As of the 2020 census, the population of the city was 106.

== History ==
The first post office in Prairie View (also spelled historically Prairieview) was established in July 1879.

== Geography ==
According to the United States Census Bureau, the city has a total area of 0.15 square miles (0.39 km^{2}), all land.

== Demographics ==
Historical population
Census	Pop.	Note	%±
1910	191		—
1920	183		−4.2%
1930	198		8.2%
1940	205		3.5%
1950	192		−6.3%
1960	188		−2.1%
1970	201		6.9%
1980	145		−27.9%
1990	111		−23.4%
2000	141		27.0%
2010	134		−5.0%
2020	106		−20.9%
U.S. Decennial Census

=== 2020 census ===
The 2020 United States census counted 106 people, 47 households, and 30 families in Prairie View. The population density was 721.1 per square mile (278.4/km^{2}). There were 65 housing units at an average density of 442.2 per square mile (170.7/km^{2}). The racial makeup was 94.34% (100) white or European American (94.34% non-Hispanic white), 0.0% (0) black or African-American, 3.77% (4) Native American or Alaska Native, 0.0% (0) Asian, 0.0% (0) Pacific Islander or Native Hawaiian, 0.0% (0) from other races, and 1.89% (2) from two or more races. Hispanic or Latino of any race was 0.0% (0) of the population.

Of the 47 households, 25.5% had children under the age of 18; 59.6% were married couples living together; 17.0% had a female householder with no spouse or partner present. 36.2% of households consisted of individuals and 19.1% had someone living alone who was 65 years of age or older. The average household size was 1.9 and the average family size was 2.2. The percent of those with a bachelor's degree or higher was estimated to be 32.1% of the population.

20.8% of the population was under the age of 18, 4.7% from 18 to 24, 21.7% from 25 to 44, 28.3% from 45 to 64, and 24.5% who were 65 years of age or older. The median age was 48.0 years. For every 100 females, there were 107.8 males. For every 100 females ages 18 and older, there were 95.3 males.

The 2016–2020 5-year American Community Survey estimates show that the median household income was $65,000 (with a margin of error of +/- $59,810) and the median family income was $120,147 (+/- $66,200). Males had a median income of $90,515 (+/- $53,433) versus $26,618 (+/- $1,830) for females. The median income for those above 16 years old was $35,313 (+/- $15,189). Approximately, 7.1% of families and 6.2% of the population were below the poverty line, including 0.0% of those under the age of 18 and 3.1% of those ages 65 or over.

=== 2010 census ===
As of the census of 2010, there were 134 people, 51 households, and 41 families residing in the city. The population density was 893.3 inhabitants per square mile (344.9/km^{2}). There were 72 housing units at an average density of 480.0 per square mile (185.3/km^{2}). The racial makeup of the city was 95.5% White and 4.5% from two or more races. Hispanic or Latino of any race were 0.7% of the population.

There were 51 households, of which 43.1% had children under the age of 18 living with them, 60.8% were married couples living together, 9.8% had a female householder with no husband present, 9.8% had a male householder with no wife present, and 19.6% were non-families. 19.6% of all households were made up of individuals, and 11.8% had someone living alone who was 65 years of age or older. The average household size was 2.63 and the average family size was 3.00.

The median age in the city was 35.5 years. 32.1% of residents were under the age of 18; 2.9% were between the ages of 18 and 24; 21.7% were from 25 to 44; 26.2% were from 45 to 64; and 17.2% were 65 years of age or older. The gender makeup of the city was 54.5% male and 45.5% female.

== Education ==
Prairie View is a part of Logan USD 326. The Logan High School mascot is Logan Trojans.

Prairie View High School was closed through school unification. The Prairie View High School mascot was Prairie View Pirates.
