= Kingsdown, Kansas =

Unincorporated community in Ford County, Kansas

- Unincorporated community
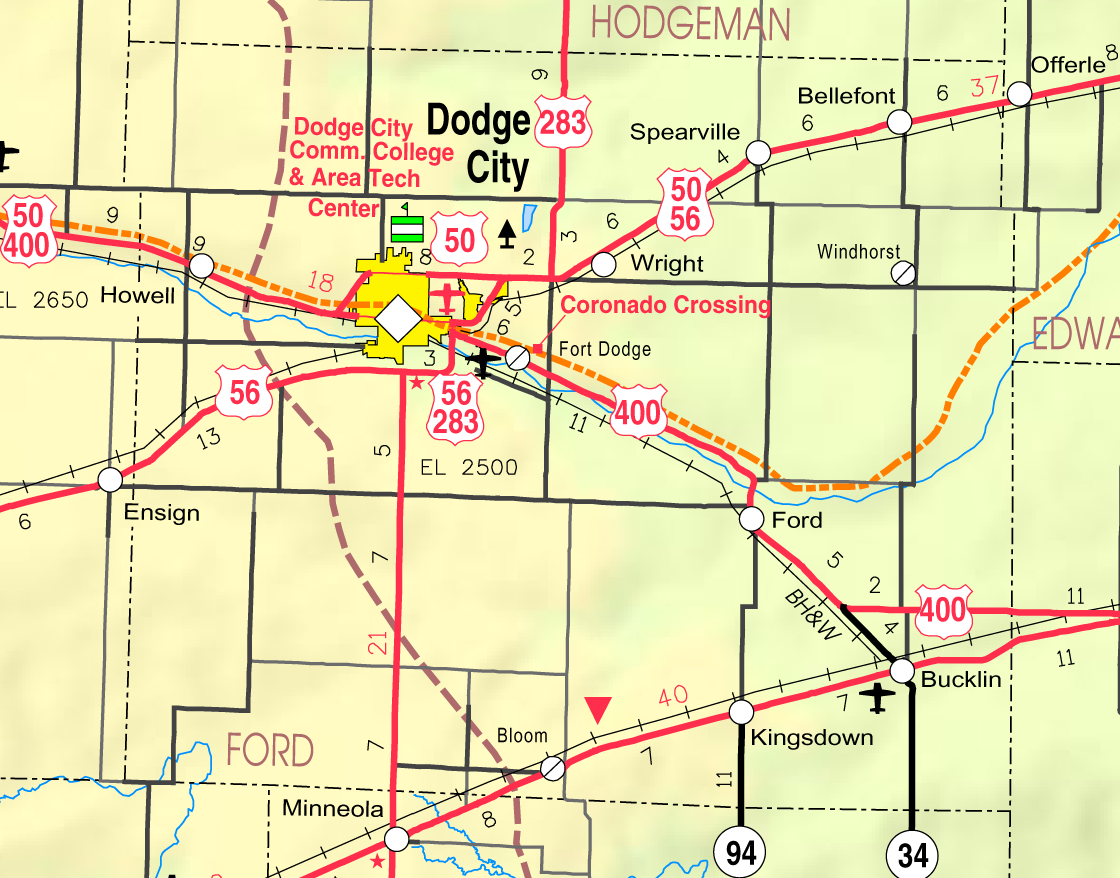
- KDOT map of Ford County (legend)

- Location within Kansas Location within the United States
- Coordinates: 37°31′30″N 99°45′31″W
- Country: United States
- State: Kansas
- County: Ford
- Founded: 1887
- Elevation: 2,510 ft (770 m)
- Time zone: UTC-6 (CST)
  - Summer (DST): UTC-5 (CDT)
- Area code: 620
- FIPS code: 20-37000
- GNIS ID: 474247

Kingsdown is an unincorporated community in Ford County, Kansas, United States. It is located along U.S. Route 54 highway.

== History ==
Kingsdown was founded in 1887.

A post office in Kingsdown opened in 1888, closed in 1891, reopened in 1892, and closed again in 1893, was re-established in 1904, and closed permanently in 1994.
