= Tarkio Limestone =

Geologic formation in Kansas, United States

- Stratigraphic range: Gzhelian (Virgilian stage)
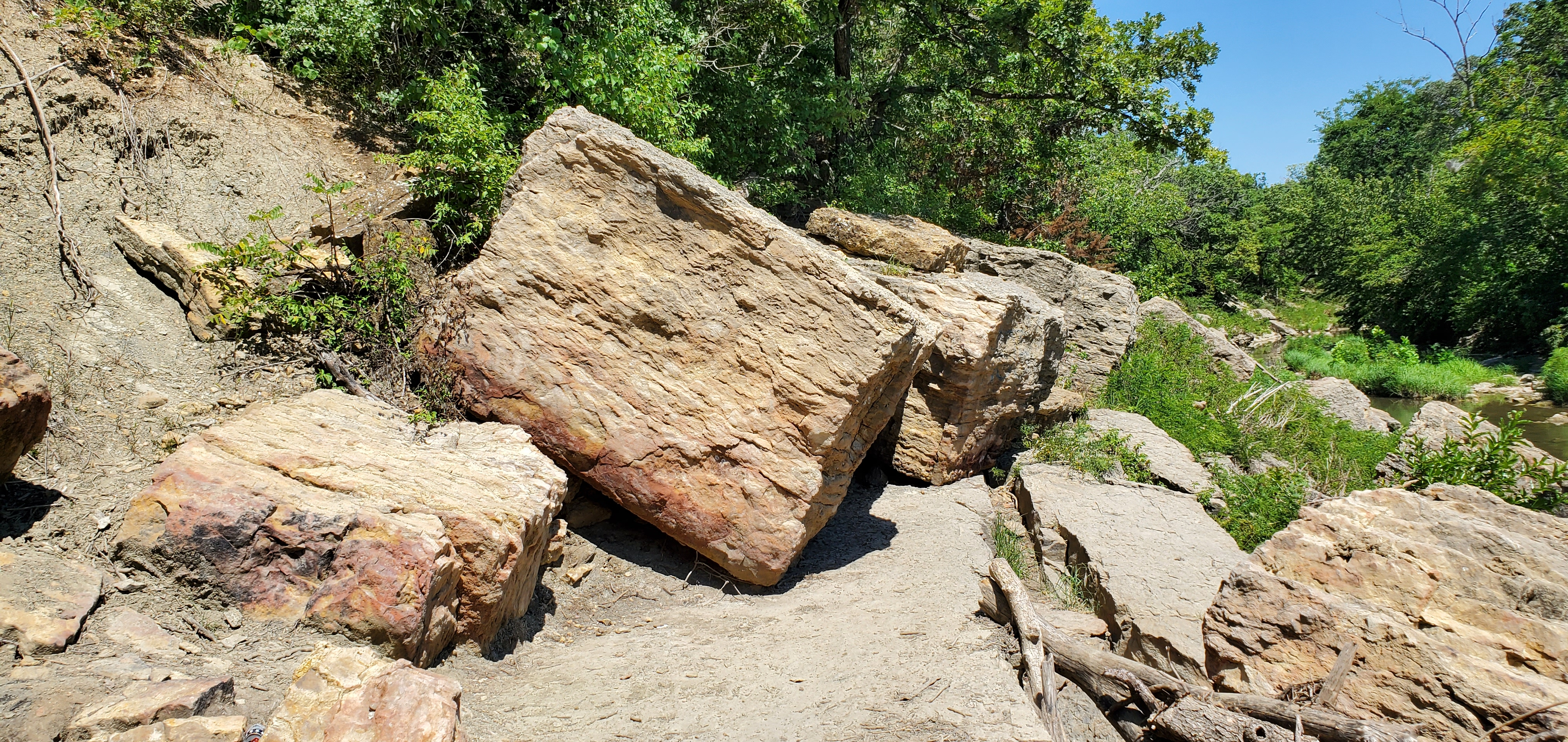
- Slumped blocks of Tarkio Limestone tumbling into Deep Creek below Pillsbury Crossing in Riley County, Kansas
- Type: Member
- Unit of: Zeandale Limestone of Wabaunsee Group
- Underlies: Wamego Shale member of Zeandale Limestone
- Overlies: Willard Shale

Lithology
- Primary: Limestone

Location
- Region: Kansas
- Country: United States

Type section
- Named for: Outcrops in the Tarkio Valley in northwestern Missouri
- Named by: G.E. Condra
- Location: Mill Creek, Maple Hill, Kansas
- Year defined: 1935

The Tarkio Limestone, is a Late-Carboniferous member of the Zeandale Formation in Kansas, extending into Nebraska, Iowa, and Missouri. The unit was named for outcrops in the Tarkio Valley in northwestern Missouri, however, R.C. Moore designated a typical exposure of this unit on Mill Creek, southwest of Maple Hill, Kansas. Owing to its unusual coloration, an early name for this rock was chocolate limestone. This rock can be recognized by its coloration and abundant fusulinids, Triticites ventricosus, protruding from the surfaces, giving a "raspy" texture.

The Tarkio Limestone forms bold bluffs along Deep Creek in southeastern Riley County, Kansas and can be easily accessed there at Pillsbury Crossing, about 30 miles (48 km) west of Maple Hill.

== See also ==
- List of fossiliferous stratigraphic units in Kansas
- Paleontology in Kansas
