= Krauth =

Krauth is a surname. Notable people with the surname include:

- Charles Krauth (disambiguation), multiple people
- Karlheinz Krauth (1936–2020), German political scientist and magazine editor
- Nigel Krauth (born 1949), Australian novelist
- Raimund Krauth (1952–2012), German footballer
- Thomas Krauth (born 1953), German art dealer and music producer
- Vanesa Krauth (born 1981), Argentine tennis player
- Marian Marsh (born Violet Krauth; 1913–2006)
- Harriet Reynolds Krauth Spaeth (1845–1925), American organist, hymnwriter, translator
