= Sigmund Spaeth =

American musicologist and author

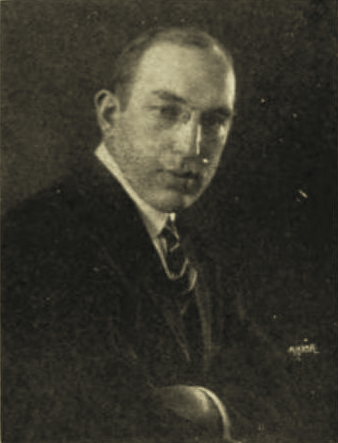
- Dr. Spaeth, c. 1922
- Born: April 10, 1885; Philadelphia, Pennsylvania, US
- Died: November 12, 1965 (aged 80); New York City, US
- Education: Haverford College (BA, MA); Princeton University (PhD)
- Occupations: Author; lecturer; composer
- Spouse: Katherine Lane
- Writing career
- Subject: Music appreciation

Sigmund Gottfried Spaeth (April 10, 1885 – November 11, 1965) was an American musicologist who sought to de-mystify classical music for the general public. His extensive knowledge of both the classical repertoire and popular song enabled him to trace the melodies of current hits back to earlier sources; this talent garnered him fame as the "Tune Detective," a role he played as an entertainer, educator, and as an expert witness in cases of plagiarism and infringement of copyrighted music.

Spaeth wrote over thirty books on both popular and classical music. He promoted his ideas about music and music appreciation with vaudeville appearances, books and magazine articles, lectures, and radio and television programs.

A serious academic, an athlete and a musician, Spaeth described himself as a "writer, broadcaster, lecturer, composer, arranger and general showman and entertainer."

== Early life and education ==
Spaeth was born in Philadelphia, Pennsylvania to Rev. Dr. Adolph Spaeth (1839–1910) and his second wife, Harriet Reynolds Krauth Spaeth (1845–1925). His father, grandfather Charles Porterfield Krauth and great-grandfather Charles Philip Krauth were Lutheran clergymen.

Music was an important part of Spaeth's childhood. His father had studied music with Friedrich Silcher at the University of Tübingen; he played the clarinet, piano and organ. His mother was an organist and hymn writer. Spaeth and nine of his ten siblings played the piano and other instruments. (Note: A half-brother, Ernest, a Wyoming rancher and president of the State Board of Sheep Commissioners, was tone-deaf. Another half-brother, John Duncan Spaeth, was Professor of English (and college organist) at Princeton and later president of Kansas City University. A younger brother, Reynold, was a well-known physiologist who died in Burma while on an expedition to study the reproductive life of monkeys.)

Spaeth attended Quaker schools and graduated from Germantown Academy in 1901, aged sixteen. He studied violin with Emil Schmidt at the Philadelphia Music Academy. He matriculated at Haverford College, where he played soccer and cricket and participated in literary and musical activities. In 1905 he received a BA, followed by an MA in English in 1906.

Spaeth taught German at Princeton University for two years (Note: Spaeth's brother John, an English professor at Princeton, recommended him for the job. Spaeth was younger than most of his students, who were juniors and seniors fulfilling a graduation requirement of one year of German.) before enrolling in its doctoral program. In 1910 he was awarded a PhD in English, German and philosophy for his thesis, "Milton's Knowledge of Music: Its Sources and its Significance in His Work." While at Princeton, he served as concertmaster of the Princeton University Orchestra and president of the Princeton Choral Society.

== Career ==
From 1910 to 1912, Spaeth taught English, coached football, soccer and swimming, and served as director of music at the Asheville School for Boys in North Carolina. While there he composed "A School Song" which was later used by Haverford College as the "Haverford Harmony Song."

=== Writing ===
In 1913, Spaeth moved to New York City and took a part-time editorial position with music publisher G. Schirmer, Inc., where he also translated lyrics from French, Italian, German, and Russian into English.

He went on to cover music for the New York Evening Mail and the Boston Evening Transcript and sports for The New York Times. He reviewed orchestral and chamber music concerts for the short-lived Opera Magazine. He also wrote a weekly column and served as music editor for Life, which was then a humor magazine.

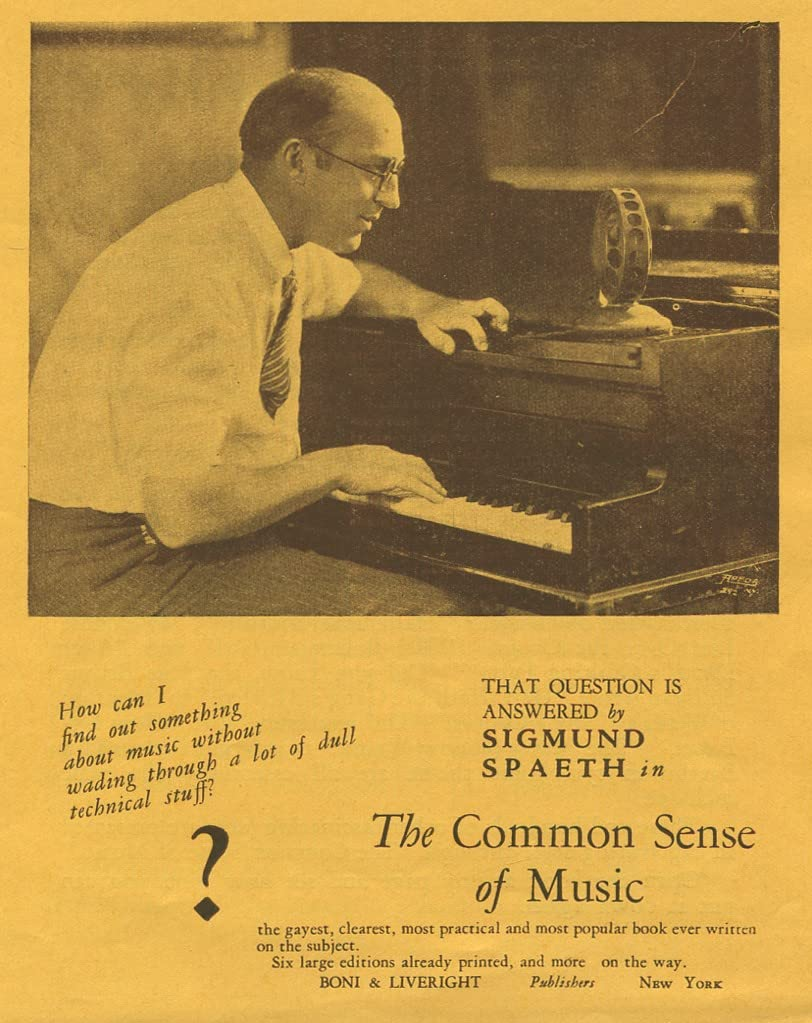
Ad for The Common Sense of Music (1925)

In addition to a popular syndicated newspaper column, "Music for Everybody", Spaeth contributed articles to many periodicals, including The New Yorker, Vanity Fair, The New Republic, Esquire, McCall's, Scribner's Magazine, Harper's, Saturday Evening Post, and Woman's Day. He was editor-in-chief of Music Journal for ten years.

While writing his first book, The Common Sense of Music, Spaeth became interested in American popular and folk music, which led to a collaboration with folk music collector Ethel Park Richardson on American Mountain Songs. This interest also resulted in a series of books on popular song in America, beginning with Read 'em and Weep: The Music You Forgot to Remember in 1926.

Spaeth recognized jazz as an authentic type of folk music, with the exception of "progressive jazz," which he called "an artificial extreme of deliberate distortion." He believed that "[t]he one great creative genius of jazz thus far is George Gershwin."

He was, however, vehemently critical of rock and roll. In the 1950s and 1960s, Spaeth reviewed the year in popular music for the Encyclopaedia Britannica Book of the Year. In the 1960 edition he wrote: "In 1959 popular music in the United States reached a new low in illiteracy, vulgarity and dullness. [...] The menace of "rock 'n' roll" continued through 1959, although it showed some signs of weakening." In an interview in 1958 he said, "I see no future for rock and roll as such, because to me rock and roll is not music. [...] The logical development of rock and roll is violence of one kind or another, including murder, and sex orgies."

=== Lectures ===
In 1920, Spaeth became educational director and later promotion manager for the American Piano Company, maker of the "Ampico", a pneumatic reproducing piano. His duties included demonstrating the instrument at public recitals. This foray into public speaking was the start of a career as a lecturer.

Spaeth fulfilled hundreds of speaking engagements per year, lecturing on music appreciation and performing his specialty act, the "Tune Detective." He spoke at schools and colleges, at men's clubs and women's clubs, and in larger venues like Radio City Music Hall and the White House, where he entertained President and Mrs. Roosevelt and Charlotte, Grand Duchess of Luxembourg in 1941.

For his unscripted "Tune Detective" lectures, Spaeth sat at a piano and demonstrated that musical phrases in popular songs could be found in older pieces. When performing as a vaudeville act, he dressed in an Inverness cape and deerstalker cap in homage to Sherlock Holmes.

A. Original lyrics to "Yes! We Have No Bananas"
B. Lyric pastiche by the "Tune Detective"

In A History of Popular Music in America, Spaeth describes his signature "Tune Detective" piece, a dissection of the popular song "Yes! We Have No Bananas":

Musically, as this writer has often pointed out, ["Yes! We Have No Bananas"] had a most distinguished background, for its chorus melody was borrowed, consciously or unconsciously, from Handel’s Hallelujah Chorus, the finish of My Bonnie, I Dreamt That I Dwelt in Marble Halls (the middle strain), and Aunt Dinah’s Quilting Party (by way of Cole Porter's An Old-Fashioned Garden). It makes an amusing trick to sing the original words wherever possible, creating this extraordinary text: “Hallelujah, Bananas! Oh, bring back my Bonnie to me. I dreamt that I dwelt in marble halls—the kind that you seldom see. I was seeing Nellie home, to an old-fashioned garden; but, Hallelujah, Bananas! Oh, bring back my Bonnie to me!”

=== Radio ===
Radio brought Spaeth to a wider audience. He first appeared on-air in 1921 at WJZ, introducing artists associated with the Ampico piano. He also worked at KDKA (Pittsburgh) and WEAF (New York). The Musical Appreciation series was broadcast on WOR in 1924.

Marcha Kroupa, Spaeth's long-time secretary, felt that his radio work was the most important aspect of his career. She wrote about his on-air delivery:

So far as I know, Dr. Spaeth was also the first to make a success of the "ad-lib" style of announcing which eventually became the bad child of the studios and is still looked upon with some disfavor. [...]
The first long distance broadcast of an athletic event also went to the credit of Sigmund Spaeth. He had written much on sports and when station WGBS arranged with the Daily News to broadcast the [1925 Rose Bowl] Stanford–Notre Dame football game with the help of a direct wire from Pasadena, the Spaeth type of announcing seemed a logical choice. It was quite a feat, as it turned out. Dr. Spaeth sat in a little room in Gimbel's New York store and was handed from time to time a few telegraphic lines such as "Miller gains three yards around right end." This material he had to dramatize and turn into a vivid story for all the eastern football fans. [...] Spaeth was on the air for nearly three hours continuously, for he had to talk even through the long intermission between halves, summing up, recapitulating, and making wise comments on plays which he later proved to have guessed quite correctly. People still talk about that broadcast.

As a sports announcer, Spaeth also covered boxing, tennis, dog shows — "everything," he later said, "except baseball."

The Tune Detective aired on NBC Radio from 1931 to 1933. In 1932 NBC added a show called Song Sleuth.

Spaeth hosted the first program to teach piano by radio; the weekly series Keys to Happiness was broadcast in 1932 and generated four thousand letters per week. Listeners could write in for a cardboard keyboard chart; Spaeth claimed that 350,000 were sent out in one year.

In the fall of 1942, Spaeth launched a program on WQXR sponsored by Columbia Records, Dr. Sigmund Spaeth and His Record Library. On the thrice-weekly show Spaeth illustrated his analysis of themes and forms on the piano before playing discs from his collection. The Mutual Broadcasting System hosted Sigmund Spaeth's Musical Quiz in 1947. In 1950 another of Spaeth's shows, At Home with Music, was nominated by the Peabody Awards Committee as the best popular presentation of good music on the air.

For twenty-five years Spaeth was a regular participant in the Metropolitan Opera's quiz, a feature presented at intermissions during live radio broadcasts.

=== Recording ===
In the early 1950s Spaeth wrote liner notes for classical albums issued by Remington Records. Remington producer Don Gabor asked him to select twenty records from the back catalog to be re-released as a series called Music Plus! In addition to writing the liner notes, Spaeth read his own commentaries and introductions after the music tracks. Spaeth's notes from Remington releases were reprinted on various other Masterseal albums.

=== Composing ===
Spaeth is better-known as a lyricist and translator than as a composer. His earliest published composition was probably the Haverford Class of 1905 song.

He collaborated on several translation projects with Cecil Cowdrey, including a re-working of the English libretto for Wagner's Tristan und Isolde for the Metropolitan Opera (1920) and the libretto of The Polish Jew, a folk-opera by Karel Weis that received its American debut at the Met in 1921. One reviewer commended Spaeth and Miss Cowdrey for their "bravery" in attempting the translation, but added, "Maybe there is a worse opera than "The Polish Jew," but I doubt it." The pair also contributed lyrics to a number of songs, including "Madrigal of May," sung by John Barrymore in the first act of Sem Benelli's stage play The Jest (1919).

Spaeth wrote lyrics for several songs by well-known composers, including "Chansonette" (1924) by Rudolf Friml and "My Little Nest of Heavenly Blue" (1922) by Franz Lehár. Spaeth composed a number of musical parodies; some were published in Words and Music:

- The Musical Adventures of Jack and Jill. The nursery rhyme parodied in several musical genres: Oratorio, Schubert, Italian Opera, Wagner, French (Debussy), and Jazz.
- The Seven Ages of Yankee Doodle. In the manner of Handel, Bach, Beethoven, Chopin, MacDowell, Tschaikovsky, Debussy and Puccini.
- The Great American Opera. An attempt to incorporate popular American musical idioms into a simulacrum of opera.

Spaeth wrote an anthem, "Our New York," which New York Mayor Fiorello La Guardia designated the city's official song in June 1940. In an interview nearly twenty years later, Spaeth called it a highly frustrating honor. "They never play it," he said. "It requires a bit of plugging."

He was founder and president of Songmart, a non-profit clearing house organized to assist amateur composers. It offered free advice on writing, copyrighting and selling songs.

=== Cinema and television ===
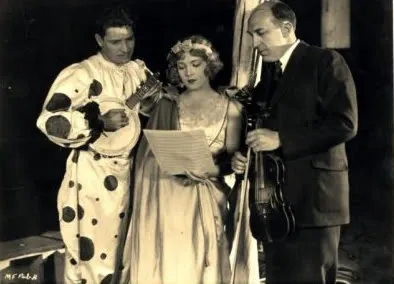
Ronald Colman, Vilma Bánky and Sigmund Spaeth on the set of The Magic Flame

Spaeth had a brief association with Hollywood.

- The Magic Flame (1927) Score. The film is considered lost.
- Show Boat (1929) "Down South (Ravenal's Theme)", lyrics to music by William H. Myddleton.
- The Trespasser (1929) Gloria Swanson (in her first talkie) sang "Serenade", composed by Enrico Toselli. The Italian lyrics by Alfredo Silvestri were translated into English by Spaeth.
- Old Tunes for New (Short, 1929) As himself.
- The Rhythm Party (Short, 1936) As himself, "tune detecting" with some Hollywood stars.
- Frankie and Johnny (1936) Uncredited acting role.

Several of Spaeth's radio shows were re-made for television in the 1950s.

- The Tune Detective (1948-) A fifteen-minute television show broadcast by New York station WPIX.
- At Home with Music
- Music for Everybody

=== Expert witness ===
"Practically every song hit is attacked by one or more deluded souls who think they wrote it first." — Sigmund Spaeth

As the reputation of the "Tune Detective" grew, Spaeth was called as an expert witness in cases of alleged plagiarism or copyright infringement. He testified in defense of Walt Disney, Sigmund Romberg, and the Victor Talking Machine Company, among others, often working with well-known copyright attorney Nathan Burkan.

The St. Louis Post-Dispatch discussed Spaeth's work as an expert witness:

Usually [Spaeth] appeared for the defendant, since he believed that only rarely did a plaintiff have a just case. He contended that most similarities in tunes are accidental, and it is always possible to find identical melodic patterns in the public domain, unprotected by copyright. He argued that circumstantial evidence had no place in a plagiarism action, and that actual imitation should be clearly proved. [...] In 1942 he was called to St. Louis to testify in suit over the motion picture, "Frankie and Johnny." Frankie Baker, who contended that she was the original figure in the barroom ballad, "Frankie and Johnny," accused Republic Pictures Corp. of defaming her in the film and sought $200,000 damages. Testifying for the defense, Spaeth insisted that the song was an American ballad long before Frankie shot her sweetheart in 1899. Spaeth sang several verses from the witness stand. The jury ruled against Frankie.

Writer Cecil Brown points out that in the Baker case Spaeth contradicted himself:

[The defense team] called Sigmund Spaeth, an authority on popular songs and ballads. Fifteen years before, in 1927, Spaeth had written a book in which he stated that the ballad “Frankie and Johnny” was based on the Frankie Baker incident. [...] Now, after receiving an expert witness fee of $2,000, Spaeth took the opposite position, claiming that the song had not originated in St. Louis and that Frankie Baker had not inspired its creation. [...] The lawyers and witnesses for Republic were all white, and the lawyers and witnesses for Frankie Baker were all black. The jury was composed of white men. The outcome of the trial was hardly surprising.

== War-time activity ==
In 1917, Spaeth resigned from the Evening Mail to become the director of industrial music at the YMCA in Bayonne, New Jersey. During World War I he worked as a song leader in the plants that were manufacturing war materiel, teaching patriotic songs, organizing bands, orchestras and glee clubs, and putting on shows.

Spaeth received recognition from the Army, the Red Cross and the Treasury Department for contributions to morale during the Second World War, which included collecting old phonograph records for scrap and using the proceeds to buy new ones for the servicemen's clubs.

== Music organizations ==
Spaeth was a member of the National Music Council, and served as president National Association of American Composers and Conductors for nine years. He was also a founder and president of the Louis Braille Music Institute in New York and chairman of the National Committee for American Music. He served as the national music chairman of Kiwanis International.

In 1928 Spaeth became the managing director of Community Concerts, a non-profit organization formed to improve access to high-quality music in local communities. Each local chapter sold subscriptions (five dollars in 1929) during a week-long membership drive. The amount of money raised determined the number of concerts and the performers, who were selected from a roster of nationally and internationally known artists provided by a group of artist's management companies working with the Community Concerts corporation. Spaeth's prominence as an expert on music increased interest in the project.

He was appointed dean of the Wurlitzer School of Music in 1937.

== Awards and recognition ==
In 1941 the National Association for American Conductors and Composers awarded Spaeth the Henry Hadley medal for outstanding services to American music.

He was a charter member of the Iota chapter of Phi Mu Alpha Sinfonia at Northwestern University, which gave him the 1958 Charles E. Lutton Man of Music Award "for his contributions to American art and culture as well as his study of the origins of American popular music."

Haverford College awarded Spaeth an honorary Doctor of Humane Letters in 1965.

== Personal life ==
Spaeth married Katherine Lane (née Adams, 1889–1965), a music critic and writer, on January 30, 1917, in Westport, Connecticut. Katherine took over her husband's reporting duties at the Evening Mail when he became involved in World War I work; he did not get the job back. The couple had no children together, although Katherine had a son from a previous marriage.

He credited his wife with his success, saying, "[She] has for years cherished the delusion that I can accomplish absolutely anything I wish. This has compelled me to keep everlastingly on the job for fear that she might some day discover her mistake."

Spaeth was a member of a number of social clubs, including The Lambs, the New York Friars Club, the Dutch Treat Club, the University Glee Club, the Bohemians, the Nassau Club, the Princeton Club, and the Bensonhurst Cricket Club.

Katherine died on July 31, 1965. Sigmund Spaeth died three months later.

== Legacy ==
Eugene Ormandy, conductor of the Philadelphia Symphony Orchestra, wrote in his introduction to Spaeth's book Great Symphonies:

I have for a long time admired and respected Dr. Spaeth’s ability to make music not only intelligible but fascinating to the average listener. He has done as much as any man living (or perhaps in all history) to reach the “mass audience” of potential music-lovers and transmit to them his own sincere and infectious enthusiasm.

In Spaeth's obituary, the New York Times noted:

Despite his success in popularizing the classics, Dr. Spaeth's most lasting effect on the American musical scene was the work he did on behalf of barbershop singing. In the 1930s, he organized barbershop "sings" in the city parks. Then in 1945 he met with about 20 other enthusiasts of close harmony at the Pennsylvania Hotel and founded the New York chapter of the Society for the Preservation and Encouragement of Barbershop Quartet Singing in America.

Spaeth summed up his belief that music should be enjoyed by everyone, whether or not they had any musical talent.

What this country needs, in addition to a good five-cent cigar, is a lot of bad piano players, ukulele players, guitar players, and possibly saxophonists and trumpeters. I'm not so sure about violinists and cellists, for their efforts are bound to be pretty painful even to themselves.

== Selected bibliography ==
Spaeth wrote many books focused primarily on music and music appreciation. He also contributed to a book of cocktail recipes and drinking songs published while Prohibition was still in effect.

=== Books ===
- Spaeth, Sigmund Gottfried (1913). Milton's Knowledge of Music: Its Sources and its Significance in His Work (PhD thesis). Princeton University.
- Spaeth, Sigmund (1924). The Common Sense of Music. New York: Boni and Liveright. ISBN 9780837162102
- —— (1979) [1926]. Read 'em and Weep: The Music You Forgot to Remember (Reprint). New York: Da Capo Press. ISBN 9780306795640.
- —— (1926). Words and Music: A Book of Burlesques. New York: Simon & Schuster.
- —— (1927). Weep Some More, My Lady. Garden City, NY: Doubleday, Page and Co.
- Paskman, Dailey; Spaeth, Sigmund (1928). "Gentlemen, Be Seated!": A Parade of the Old-time Minstrels. Garden City, New York: Doubleday, Doran & Company.
- Spaeth, Sigmund (1929). They Still Sing of Love. New York: Horace Liveright.
- Roe, Charles; Schwenk, Jim (1930). The Home Bartenders Guide and Song Book. Songs collected and arranged by Sigmund Spaeth. New York: The Experimenter Publications.
- Spaeth, Sigmund (1933). The Art of Enjoying Music. New York: Whittlesey Press.
- —— (1934). The Facts of Life in Popular Song. New York: Whittlesey House.
- —— (1972) [1936]. Great Symphonies: How to Recognize and Remember Them (1952 revised ed.). Westport, Connecticut: Greenwood Press. ISBN 0837156416.
- —— (1939). Maxims to Music. New York: Robert M. McBride Co.
- —— (1940). Great Program Music: How to Remember and Enjoy It. Garden City, New York: Garden City Publishing.
- —— (1940). Stories behind the World's Great Music. Garden City, New York: Garden City Publishing.
- —— (1948). A History of Popular Music in America. New York: Random House. Reviewed in the journal Notes
- —— (1950). Dedication: The Love Story of Clara and Robert Schumann. New York: Henry Holt and Company.
- Spaeth, Sigmund, ed. (1950). Music and Dance in the New England States. New York: Bureau of Musical Research. Other volumes in the Music and Dance survey which were edited by Spaeth include Music and Dance in New York State, Music and Dance in Pennsylvania, New Jersey and Delaware, Music and Dance in the Southern States and Music and Dance in the Southeastern States.
- ——, ed. (1953). Golden Autoharp Harmonies. Des Moines, Iowa: National Autoharp Sales Company.
- Spaeth, Sigmund (1959). How to Play the Hohner Harmonica; New Easy Method for Beginners. Hicksville, New York: M. Hohner, Inc.
- —— (1959). Fifty Years with Music in America. New York: Fleet Publishing. LCCN 59-8930.

Song collections (as editor)

- Spaeth, Sigmund, ed. (1925). Barber Shop Ballads: A Book of Close Harmony. New York: Simon and Schuster. Issued with two phonograph records of a barbershop quartet with Spaeth singing baritone.
- Richardson, Ethel Park (1927). Spaeth, Sigmund (ed.). American Mountain Songs. New York: Greenburg.
- Spaeth, Sigmund, ed. (1942). Barber Shop Harmony: A Collection of New and Old Favorites for Male Quartets. New York: Mills Music.
- ——; Thompson, Carl O., eds. (1943). 55 Art Songs. Boston: C.C. Birchard and Company. Spaeth provided "new singable translations of the German, French, Italian, and Russian songs."
- ——, ed. (1956). Barber Shop Classics, 16 Songs. New York: Remick Music.

=== Articles ===
- Spaeth, Sigmund (December 1913). "Opera in Prospect and Retrospect". Vanity Fair. Vol. 1, no. 4.
- —— (April 1915). "Translating to Music". The Musical Quarterly. 1 (2): 291–298. doi:10.1093/mq/I.2.291. JSTOR 737851.
- —— (April 5, 1924). "Making America Musical" (PDF). The Billboard. p. 51.
- —— (August 1928a). "Jazz is not music". Forum. Vol. 80, no. 2. pp. 267–271.
- —— (December 1931). "O Opera, O Mores". Harper's. Vol. LXI, no. 3. pp. 17, 100.
- —— (December 1941). "Your Husband's Musical Taste". Woman's Day. Vol. 5, no. 3. pp. 26–27.

== Notes and references ==
Notes

== Sources ==
- Spaeth, Sigmund (March 1951). "The Reminiscences of Sigmund Spaeth 1951" (Interview). Interviewed by Hill, Frank Ernest. Columbia University.
- Spaeth, Sigmund (1958). "Oral History Interview with Sigmund Spaeth 1958" (Interview). Interviewed by Franklin, Joan; Franklin, Robert. Columbia University. OCLC 1162867117.
- Steinberg, Michael; Roth, Larry (2006). "Sigmund Spaeth, Someone You Should Know". For the Love of Music: Invitations to Listening. New York: Oxford University Press. pp. 187–197.
