= Maple Hill Bridge =

- Coordinates: 39°07′16″N 96°01′26″W
- Carries: 2 lanes of Maple Hill Road
- Crosses: Kansas River
- Locale: northeast of Maple Hill, Kansas

Characteristics
- Design: unknown

The Maple Hill Bridge is an automobile crossing of the Kansas River near Maple Hill, Kansas and opened in 2009. The bridge provides quick access to U.S. Highway 24 to the north and Interstate 70 to the south.
