= Charles Krauth =

Charles Krauth may refer to:

- Charles Philip Krauth (1797–1867), Lutheran clergyman
- Charles Porterfield Krauth (1823–1883), Lutheran pastor, theologian and educator
