= Cross v. United States (1916) =

- Supreme Court of the United States

Argued October 23, 1916 Decided November 13, 1916
- Full case name: Cross v. United States
- Citations: 242 U.S. 4 (more) 37 S. Ct. 5; 61 L. Ed. 114; 1916 U.S. LEXIS 1569

Case history
- Prior: On appeal from the Court of Claims
- Subsequent: No subsequent appellate history or revisitation.

Holding
- Fees may not rightfully be charged against the United States by a clerk of a federal court for making triplicate copies of declarations of intention, or for attaching the seal of the court thereto. The Naturalization Act, by the express prohibition against additional charges, precludes any right of the clerk which might otherwise exist to charge fees against the United States for the services here in question.

Court membership
- Chief Justice Edward D. White Associate Justices Joseph McKenna · Oliver W. Holmes Jr. William R. Day · Willis Van Devanter; Mahlon Pitney · James C. McReynolds; Louis Brandeis · John H. Clarke

Case opinion
- Majority: White, joined by Holmes, McKenna, Day, Van Devanter, Pitney, McReynolds, Brandeis, Clarke

Laws applied
- Naturalization Act of 1906, §828 Rev. Stat.

Cross v. United States, 242 U.S. 4 (1916), was a United States Supreme Court case regarding remuneration for clerks of the court for the copying and docketing of naturalization claims.

== Prior History ==
Appellant Cross, a federal court clerk, filed a claim against the United States to be paid fees for making triplicate copies of original declarations of intention for naturalization and attaching the seal of the court to the same. The United States Court of Claims (then simply the Court of Claims) denied his claim. The clerk appealed.

== Holding ==
Justice White wrote the opinion of the court:

A charge by a clerk of a Federal district court of fees for making, on the direction of the Bureau of Immigration and Naturalization, triplicate copies of original declarations of intention for naturalization, and attaching the seal of the court, is not authorized by the general provisions of U. S. Rev. Stat. 828, since if the duty to render such services was expressly commanded by the Naturalization Act of June 29, 1906, the right to charge therefore would be clearly forbidden by the prohibitory provision of §21, such services not having been included in the enumeration of fees in §13.

== See also ==
- List of United States Supreme Court cases, volume 242
