= Nathan Burkan =

Jewish-American lawyer (1879–1936)

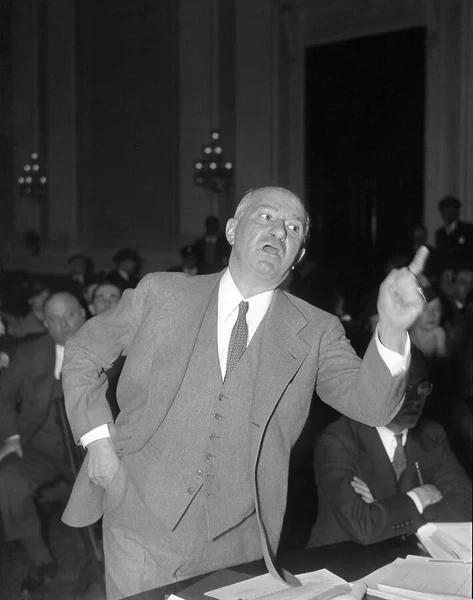
Nathan Burkan

Nathan Burkan (November 8, 1879 – June 6, 1936) was a Romanian-born Jewish-American lawyer from New York.

== Life ==
Burkan was born on November 8, 1879, in Iași, Romania, the son of Moritz Burkan and Tillie Armm.

Burkan immigrated to America in 1886 and settled with his family on the Lower East Side of Manhattan where his father operated a series of luncheonettes and pool rooms in the red-light district. He was enrolled in the City College of New York when he was fifteen and graduated three years later. He then did a two-year course at the New York University School of Law, graduating from there in 1899. As he was too young to be admitted to the state bar that year, he initially worked as a stenographer with lawyer Julius Lehmann in the Woolworth Building. He was admitted to the bar in 1900.

Burkan wasn't a member of a white-shoe firm and never had any partners, although he did have associates and at one point occupied an entire floor of the Continental Building at Broadway and 41st Street. His first major client was light opera composer Victor Herbert. A copyright attorney, a number of his clients were important figures in show business, like Charlie Chaplin and Florenz Ziegfeld, and motion picture companies like United Artists, Columbia Picture Association, and Metro-Goldwyn-Mayer. In 1930, he successfully defended Mae West when she faced obscenity charges over her show Pleasure Man, only to reportedly sue her afterwards for failing to pay his fees. He appeared on behalf of Gloria Morgan Vanderbilt in the custody battle over her daughter Gloria. In 1906, he testified before Congress on behalf of the Music Publishers Association to increase copyright protection for intellectual property owners. This led to the Copyright Act of 1909. In 1914, he helped Victor Herbert, Irving Berlin, and other composers and music publishers to form the American Society of Composers, Authors and Publishers (ASCAP) in order to protect their intellectual rights. As part of the ASCAP's efforts to sell licenses to businesses that wanted to play their music, Burkan filed a lawsuit on behalf of Herbert against a New York City restaurant that played Herbert's song Sweethearts. The lawsuit, Herbert v. Shanley Co., reached the United States Supreme Court, where Justice Oliver Wendell Holmes sided with Herbert and the ASCAP. His clients also included Samuel Goldwyn, Arthur M. Loew, Ernst Lubitsch, Constance Bennett, Walter Wanger, and Jesse Lasky.

Burkan was a delegate to the 1915 New York State Constitutional Convention. He was an alternate delegate to the 1916 Democratic National Convention and a delegate to the 1924, 1928, and 1936 Democratic National Conventions. He was also a member of the New York State Democratic Committee by 1930, a presidential elector in the 1932 presidential election, and a delegate to the 1933 convention to ratify the 21st Amendment in New York. He served as the Democratic leader in the 17th Assembly District in southern Manhattan from 1915 until his death and as chairman of the Triborough Bridge Authority in 1933.

Burkan was an executive member of Tammany Hall and a member of the American Bar Association, the New York State Bar Association, the New York County Lawyers' Association, The Lambs, the Friars Club, the Level Club, the New York Athletic Club, the Lakeville Golf and Country Club, the Oakridge Golf and Country Club, and the Bohemians. He attended Temple Beth-El. In 1927, he married Marienne Alexander in a surprise ceremony at his apartment officiated by Rabbi Nathan Krass. His son Nathan Burkan Jr. was a lawyer who served as counsel of the Office of Rent Control of the Housing and Development Administration.

Burkan died from an attack of acute indigestion at his country home in Great Neck on June 6, 1936. Three thousand people attended his funeral at Temple Emanu-El, with another 500 people standing outside the Temple. Gene Buck, president of the ASCAP, delivered the eulogy, and the services were conducted by Rabbi Nathan A. Perilman and Cantor Moshe Rudinow. Mayor Fiorello La Guardia and former Mayor James J. Walker led the funeral procession of over fifty honorary pallbearers, who consisted of jurists, Tammany leaders, stage personalities, and conductors. Among those who attended the funeral were New York Supreme Court Justices Peter J. Schmuck, Ferdinand Pecora, Julius Miller, Aaron J. Levy, and Salvatore A. Cotillo, General Sessions Judges Morris Koenig, Owen W. Bohan, George L. Donnellan, and James Garrett Wallace, Federal Judges John C. Knox and Martin T. Manton, Surrogate James A. Foley, Representative Sol Bloom, former Supreme Court Justice Thomas C. T. Crain, Grover A. Whalen, George V. McLaughlin, James J. Hines, A. C. Blumenthal, Will Hays, Irving Berlin, Morris Gest, District Attorney William C. Dodge, Nicholas and Joseph Schenck, and Gloria Morgan Vanderbilt. He was buried in Union Field Cemetery in Queens.
