= Joseph Norman Dolley =

American bank commissioner

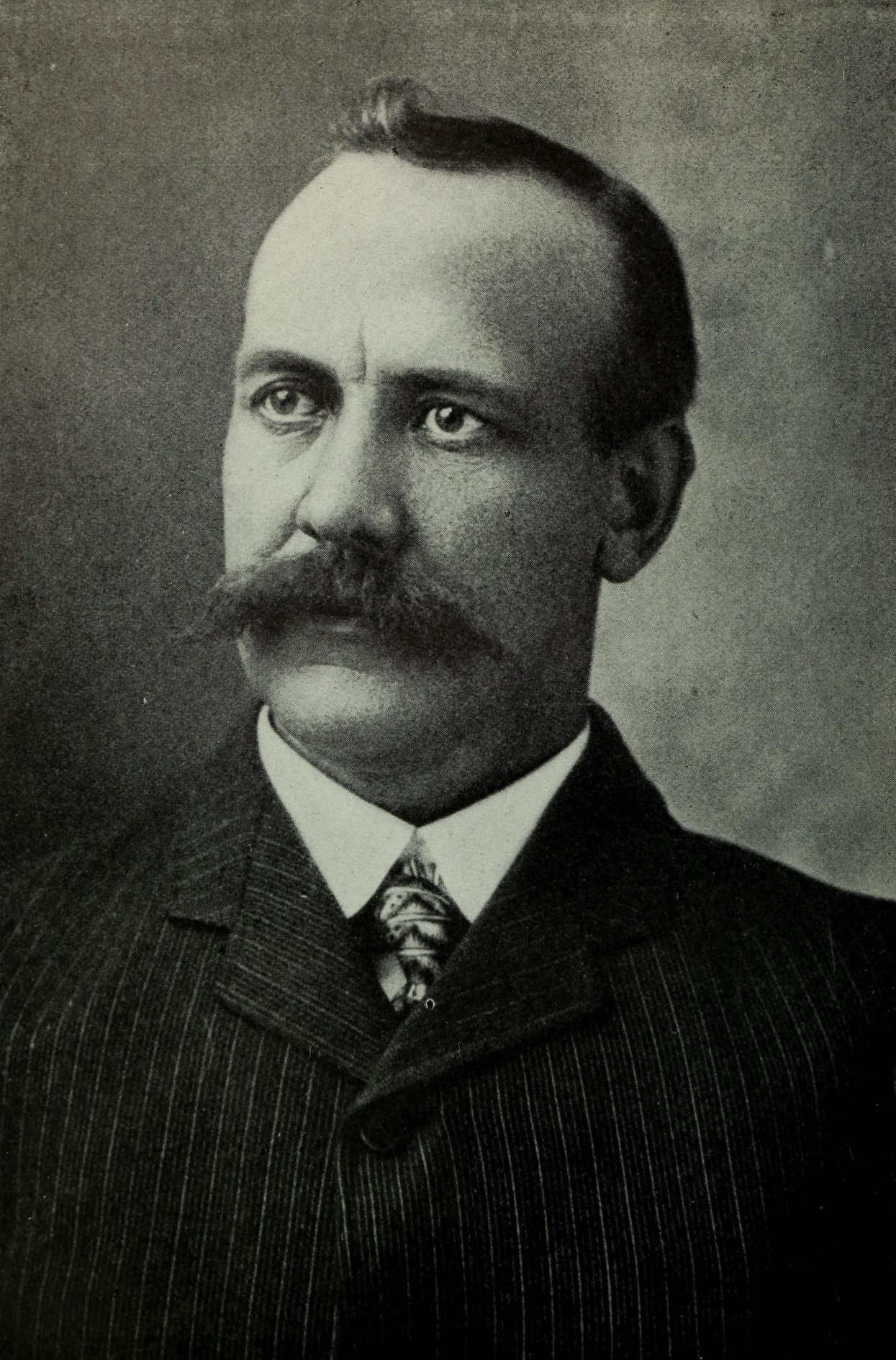
Portrait of Joseph Norman Dolley.

Joseph Norman Dolley (1860–1940) was the bank commissioner of State of Kansas who pushed for the passage of the first state securities laws, known as the blue-sky laws. J.N. Dolley, as he was known, was born in Boston, Massachusetts, a son of Joseph Norman and Ellen (Broderick) Dolley. On October 13, 1887, he married Mary E. McClellan, of Pennsylvania. At the time of their marriage she was a resident of Maple Hill, Kansas. They had a daughter, Esther A. Dolley.

Dolley received a common school education, and, while young, went to sea with his father. He continued as a sailor until 1885. He then moved to Kansas, where he went into business as a country merchant and proprietor of a blacksmith shop. These were the earliest business enterprises of the town of Maple Hill, where Dolley was virtually the first settler and the founder of the town.

Shortly thereafter Dolley became interested in banking. He went on to become the president of the Commercial National Bank of Alma, and vice-president of the Stockgrowers' State Bank of Maple Hill, generally known at the time as "Dolley's Bank." Dolley appeared to be achievement oriented, and in addition to his banking positions was also president of the Mid-Kansas Milling Company of Alma, the Kansas Home Mutual Life Insurance Company of Topeka, the P. C. C. Oil & Gas Company of Chanute, the Maple Hill school board, and vice-president of the Wabaunsee County Telephone Company.

The "Topeka Daily Capital" of Jan. 3, 1909, reported: "Joe Dolley hadn't been in Kansas long enough to get the seaweed out of his hair before he was in politics…. No stopping Dolley in Wabaunsee, where the farmers know him, trust him, believe in him and vote for him."

In 1902, Dolley was elected to represent his county in the lower branch of the state legislature. In 1904 he was elected to the state senate from the twenty-first district, composed of the counties of Wabaunsee, Riley and Geary. After four years in the senate he was again elected representative from Wabaunsee county, and was speaker of the Kansas House of Representatives in the 1909-1910 session. In 1910 and 1911 he was favorably mentioned by several Kansas newspapers as a candidate for governor.

During the presidential campaign of 1908, Dolley was chairman of the Republican state central committee, and with a fund of less than $20,000 carried the state for the William Howard Taft electors by a plurality of over 37,000. However, four years later, Dolley painfully informed Taft that Kansas was going to Theodore Roosevelt. (New York Times February 12, 1912.)

On, March 3, 1909, Governor Walter R. Stubbs appointed Dolley state bank commissioner, in which capacity Dolley served from April 1, 1909 through March 1, 1913. As bank commissioner, Dolley became increasingly angry about fraudsters cheating banking customers out of their savings. The Saturday Evening Post of December 2, 1911 (Volume 184, Number 23) quoted him:

"Why, I had been in the banking business here in Kansas a good many years before I became bank commissioner," he explained when I asked him about the genesis of the Blue Sky Law. "Every now and then I would hear of one of these swindles – that somebody had lost his money through buying stock in a fake mine, or in a Central America plantation that was nine parts imagination, or in some wonderful investment company that was going to pay forty per cent dividends. Sometimes I knew the man or woman who had been swindled. Of course I thought it was an outrage, but I don't know as it occurred to me then that there was any way to stop it.

After I was appointed bank commissioner I heard more reports and complaints of fake stock swindles than ever. The banks hear of such cases because usually the victim draws money out of a bank to buy his wildcat mining shares or his stock in a lunar oil company, or whatever it may be. Kansas has been prosperous of late years, you know; the people have accumulated money. If you go back fifteen years you will see that all the state banks in Kansas then held less than fourteen million dollars of the people's deposits. Now they hold ninety millions and the national banks of the state sixty millions. That's fat picking.

In 1911, as a result of Dolley's lobbying efforts, Kansas became the first state to enact a "comprehensive" securities law requiring registration of both securities and their salesmen. Dolley used the term "Blue Sky" in connection with promoting passage of the statute, and the term was used by those reporting on it. See "Joe Dolley Is After the Blue Sky Merchants", Topeka Capital-Journal, December 22, 1910.

Dolley had complained about the "enormous amount of money the Kansas people are being swindled out of by these fakers and 'blue-sky' merchants.' ": Letter from J. N. Dolley Dec. 16, 1910 reprinted in Brief for Appellees at 33, Merrick v. N. W- Halsey & Co., 242 US. 568 (1917) (No. 413), cited in J.R- Macey and G.P. Miller, "Origin of the Blue Sky Law", (1991) 70 Tex .L.Rev. 347 at 360 n. 59.

The Kansas law was a response to salesmen duping unwitting investors by selling worthless interests in fly-by-night companies and gold mines along the back roads of Kansas. It was reportedly said that no assets backed up those securities—nothing but the blue skies of Kansas.

Dolley died, according to an obituary in the New York Times of that date, from injuries sustained when he was hit by a car while crossing the street.
