= Hutchinson Ice Cream Co. v. Iowa =

- Supreme Court of the United States

Argued November 13, 1916 Decided December 4, 1916
- Full case name: Hutchinson Ice Cream Co. v. Iowa
- Citations: 242 U.S. 153 (more) 37 S. Ct. 28; 61 L. Ed. 217

Holding
- The local law banning the sale of products without sufficient butter-fat content as "ice cream" was constitutional.

Court membership
- Chief Justice Edward D. White Associate Justices Joseph McKenna · Oliver W. Holmes Jr. William R. Day · Willis Van Devanter; Mahlon Pitney · James C. McReynolds; Louis Brandeis · John H. Clarke

Case opinion
- Majority: Brandeis, joined by unanimous

Hutchinson Ice Cream Co. v. Iowa, 242 U.S. 153 (1916), was a United States Supreme Court case in which the Court held that the local law banning the sale of products without sufficient butter-fat content as "ice cream" was constitutional.

== Significance ==
Even during the Lochner era, when the Court was anxious to protect economic due process as a fundamental right, the Court consistently upheld the regulation of dairy in cases like Hutchinson Ice Cream Co..

== See also ==
- Adams v. Milwaukee
