= Adams v. Milwaukee =

- Supreme Court of the United States

Argued April 23, 1913 Decided May 12, 1913
- Full case name: Adams v. Milwaukee
- Citations: 228 U.S. 572 (more)

Holding
- The local ordinance ordering the confiscation of tainted milk was constitutional.

Court membership
- Chief Justice Edward D. White Associate Justices Joseph McKenna · Oliver W. Holmes Jr. William R. Day · Horace H. Lurton; Charles E. Hughes · Willis Van Devanter; Joseph R. Lamar · Mahlon Pitney

Case opinion
- Majority: McKenna, joined by unanimous

Adams v. Milwaukee, 228 U.S. 572 (1913), was a United States Supreme Court case in which the Court held that the local ordinance ordering the confiscation of tainted milk was constitutional.

== Case summary ==
Plaintiff Adams, a milk producer, challenged the City of Milwaukee, the defendant, for its ordinance that regulated the sale of milk. The ordinance required testing on milk from outside the city for tuberculosis and other contagious diseases, as well as proper labeling. The U.S. Supreme Court upheld the constitutionality of the ordinance, finding it to be a proper exercise of defendant's police power to protect public health. The Court dismissed Plaintiff's claims, finding that the ordinance was not arbitrary discrimination and that the enforcement measures were reasonable and necessary.

== Significance ==
Even during the Lochner era, when the Court was anxious to protect economic due process as a fundamental right, the Court consistently upheld the regulation of dairy in cases like Adams.

== See also ==
- Hutchinson Ice Cream Co. v. Iowa
