= Inter-Island Steam Navigation Co. v. Ward =

Inter-Island Stream Nav. Co. v. Ward
- Supreme Court of the United States

Argued October 9, 1916 Decided October 30, 1916
- Full case name: Inter-Island Steam Navigation Co., Ltd. v. Ward
- Citations: 242 U.S. 1 (more) 37 S. Ct. 1; 61 L. Ed. 113

Case history
- Prior: On error from Ninth Circuit Court of Appeals.
- Subsequent: None

Holding
- A writ of error will not lie from the United States Supreme Court to review a judgment of the circuit court of appeals in a case presenting neither diversity of citizenship nor federal question, which was taken to that court from the Supreme Court of Hawaii, pursuant to Judicial Code, § 246, as amended by the Act of January 28, 1915, 38 Stat. 803, c. 22, upon the basis of pecuniary amount alone.

Court membership
- Chief Justice Edward D. White Associate Justices Joseph McKenna · Oliver W. Holmes Jr. William R. Day · Willis Van Devanter; Mahlon Pitney · James C. McReynolds; Louis Brandeis · John H. Clarke

Case opinion
- Majority: Chief Justice White, joined by all

Laws applied
- Judicial Code, § 246

Inter-Island Steam Navigation Co. v. Ward, 242 U.S. 1 (1916), was a civil lawsuit that came before the Supreme Court of the United States in 1916. It involved the Inter-Island Steam Navigation Company, a shipping company operating in the Hawaiian Islands. The Supreme Court declined to review a judgment of the Ninth Circuit Court of Appeals.
