= Hall v. Geiger-Jones Co. =

- Supreme Court of the United States

Argued October 16–17, 1916 Decided January 22, 1917
- Full case name: Hall v. Geiger-Jones Company
- Citations: 242 U.S. 539 (more) 37 S. Ct. 217; 61 L. Ed. 480; 1917 U.S. LEXIS 2155; L.R.A. 1917F; 15 Ohio Law Rep. 39; Am.Ann.Cas. 1917C, 643

Case history
- Prior: Geiger-Jones Co. v. Turner, 230 F. 233 (1916)

Holding
- The Court upheld individual states' power to regulate the offer, sale, and purchase of securities.

Court membership
- Chief Justice Edward D. White Associate Justices Joseph McKenna · Oliver W. Holmes Jr. William R. Day · Willis Van Devanter; Mahlon Pitney · James C. McReynolds; Louis Brandeis · John H. Clarke

Case opinions
- Majority: McKenna, joined by White, Holmes, Day, Devanter, Pitney, Brandeis, Clarke
- Dissent: McReynolds

Hall v. Geiger-Jones Co., 242 U.S. 539 (1917), is a United States Supreme Court case in which the Court upheld individual states' power to regulate the offer, sale, and purchase of securities. Such regulatory laws are commonly known today as "blue-sky laws"; the phrase is often said to be based on this opinion, although speculative securities were described as "blue sky" in sources published prior to this opinion. The opinion itself said:

The name that is given to the law indicates the evil at which it is aimed, that is, to use the language of a cited case, "speculative schemes which have no more basis than so many feet of 'blue sky'"; or, as stated by counsel in another case, "to stop the sale of stock in fly-by-night concerns, visionary oil wells, distant gold mines and other like fraudulent exploitations."

— 242 U.S. 539, 550 (1917).

The decision rejected the notion of an arbitrary and capricious power accruing to state securities commissioners. The opinion author, Justice Joseph McKenna, reasoned such a broad delegation to state official was justified because valuing securities is "a complex problem" and requires skill and expertise often not available to the individual investor. Justice McKenna wrote of checks on government abuse because, "an adverse judgment by the commissioner is reviewable by the courts."
