= List of United States Supreme Court cases, volume 242 =

Supreme Court of the United States
- Interactive map of Supreme Court of the United States
- 38°53′26″N 77°00′16″W
- Established: March 4, 1789; 236 years ago
- Location: Washington, D.C.
- Coordinates: 38°53′26″N 77°00′16″W
- Composition method: Presidential nomination with Senate confirmation
- Authorised by: Constitution of the United States, Art. III, § 1
- Judge term length: life tenure, subject to impeachment and removal
- Number of positions: 9 (by statute)
- Website: supremecourt.gov

This is a list of cases reported in volume 242 of United States Reports, decided by the Supreme Court of the United States in 1916 and 1917.

== Justices of the Supreme Court at the time of volume 242 U.S. ==
The Supreme Court is established by Article III, Section 1 of the Constitution of the United States, which says: "The judicial Power of the United States, shall be vested in one supreme Court . . .". The size of the Court is not specified; the Constitution leaves it to Congress to set the number of justices. Under the Judiciary Act of 1789 Congress originally fixed the number of justices at six (one chief justice and five associate justices). Since 1789, Congress has varied the size of the Court from six to seven, nine, ten, and back to nine justices (always including one chief justice).

When the cases in volume 242 were decided the Court comprised the following nine members:

| Portrait | Justice | Office | Home State | Succeeded | Date confirmed by the Senate (Vote) | Tenure on Supreme Court |
|---|---|---|---|---|---|---|
| | Edward Douglass White | Chief Justice | Louisiana | Melville Fuller | December 12, 1910 (Acclamation) | December 19, 1910 – May 19, 1921 (Died) |
| | Joseph McKenna | Associate Justice | California | Stephen Johnson Field | January 21, 1898 (Acclamation) | January 26, 1898 – January 5, 1925 (Retired) |
| | Oliver Wendell Holmes Jr. | Associate Justice | Massachusetts | Horace Gray | December 4, 1902 (Acclamation) | December 8, 1902 – January 12, 1932 (Retired) |
| | William R. Day | Associate Justice | Ohio | George Shiras Jr. | February 23, 1903 (Acclamation) | March 2, 1903 – November 13, 1922 (Retired) |
| | Willis Van Devanter | Associate Justice | Wyoming | Edward Douglass White (as Associate Justice) | December 15, 1910 (Acclamation) | January 3, 1911 – June 2, 1937 (Retired) |
| | Mahlon Pitney | Associate Justice | New Jersey | John Marshall Harlan | March 13, 1912 (50–26) | March 18, 1912 – December 31, 1922 (Resigned) |
| | James Clark McReynolds | Associate Justice | Tennessee | Horace Harmon Lurton | August 29, 1914 (44–6) | October 12, 1914 – January 31, 1941 (Retired) |
| | Louis Brandeis | Associate Justice | Massachusetts | Joseph Rucker Lamar | June 1, 1916 (47–22) | June 5, 1916 – February 13, 1939 (Retired) |
| | John Hessin Clarke | Associate Justice | Ohio | Charles Evans Hughes | July 24, 1916 (Acclamation) | October 9, 1916 – September 18, 1922 (Retired) |

== Notable Case in 242 U.S. ==
=== Caminetti v. United States ===
In Caminetti v. United States, 242 U.S. 470 (1917), the Supreme Court interpreted the scope of the Mann Act. The Court decided the Mann Act applied not only to purposes of prostitution but also to other noncommercial consensual sexual liaisons, and that consensual extramarital sex falls within the definition of "immoral sex." The case was one of the first in which the Court embraced the "plain meaning rule". This is a form of legislative interpretation that focuses strongly on the literal text of a statute. In its most extreme form, the plain meaning rule does not point outside the words of the statute at any other sources to find legislative intent, if the Court decides that the rule is "plain" from its text alone.

== Citation style ==
Under the Judiciary Act of 1789 the federal court structure at the time comprised District Courts, which had general trial jurisdiction; Circuit Courts, which had mixed trial and appellate (from the US District Courts) jurisdiction; and the United States Supreme Court, which had appellate jurisdiction over the federal District and Circuit courts—and for certain issues over state courts. The Supreme Court also had limited original jurisdiction (i.e., in which cases could be filed directly with the Supreme Court without first having been heard by a lower federal or state court). There were one or more federal District Courts and/or Circuit Courts in each state, territory, or other geographical region.

The Judiciary Act of 1891 created the United States Courts of Appeals and reassigned the jurisdiction of most routine appeals from the district and circuit courts to these appellate courts. The Act created nine new courts that were originally known as the "United States Circuit Courts of Appeals." The new courts had jurisdiction over most appeals of lower court decisions. The Supreme Court could review either legal issues that a court of appeals certified or decisions of court of appeals by writ of certiorari. On January 1, 1912, the effective date of the Judicial Code of 1911, the old Circuit Courts were abolished, with their remaining trial court jurisdiction transferred to the U.S. District Courts.

Bluebook citation style is used for case names, citations, and jurisdictions.

- "# Cir." = United States Court of Appeals
  - e.g., "3d Cir." = United States Court of Appeals for the Third Circuit
- "D." = United States District Court for the District of . . .
  - e.g.,"D. Mass." = United States District Court for the District of Massachusetts
- "E." = Eastern; "M." = Middle; "N." = Northern; "S." = Southern; "W." = Western
  - e.g.,"M.D. Ala." = United States District Court for the Middle District of Alabama
- "Ct. Cl." = United States Court of Claims
- The abbreviation of a state's name alone indicates the highest appellate court in that state's judiciary at the time.
  - e.g.,"Pa." = Supreme Court of Pennsylvania
  - e.g.,"Me." = Supreme Judicial Court of Maine

== List of cases in volume 242 U.S. ==
| Case Name | Page & year | Opinion of the Court | Concurring opinion(s) | Dissenting opinion(s) | Lower Court | Disposition |
|---|---|---|---|---|---|---|
| Inter-Island Steam Navigation Company, Ltd. v. Ward | 1 (1916) | White | none | none | 9th Cir. | dismissed |
| Cross v. United States | 4 (1916) | White | none | none | Ct. Cl. | affirmed |
| Portuguese-American Bank v. Welles | 7 (1916) | Holmes | none | none | 9th Cir. | reversed |
| Louisville and Nashville Railroad Company v. Parker | 13 (1916) | Holmes | none | none | Ky. | affirmed |
| Seaboard Air Line Railroad Company v. City of Raleigh | 15 (1916) | White | none | none | E.D.N.C. | affirmed |
| O'Neil v. Northern Colorado Irrigation Company | 20 (1916) | Holmes | none | none | Colo. | affirmed |
| Ex parte United States | 27 (1916) | White | none | none | N.D. Ohio | mandamus granted |
| Lehon v. City of Atlanta | 53 (1916) | McKenna | none | none | Ga. Ct. App. | affirmed |
| Atlantic City Railroad Company v. Parker | 56 (1916) | Holmes | none | none | N.J. | affirmed |
| Louisville and Nashville Railroad Company v. United States | 60 (1916) | Holmes | none | Pitney | M.D. Tenn. | reversed |
| United States v. Oppenheimer | 85 (1916) | Holmes | none | none | S.D.N.Y. | affirmed |
| Pennsylvania Railroad Company v. W.F. Jacoby and Co. | 89 (1916) | Day | none | none | 3d Cir. | reversed |
| Seton Hall College v. Village of South Orange | 100 (1916) | Day | none | none | N.J. Sup. Ct. | affirmed |
| Swift and Company v. Hoover | 107 (1916) | Day | none | none | Sup. Ct. D.C. | dismissed |
| Kansas City, Memphis and Birmingham Railroad Company v. Stiles | 111 (1916) | Day | none | none | Ala. | affirmed |
| Pennsylvania Railroad Company v. Sonman Shaft Coal Company | 120 (1916) | VanDevanter | none | none | Pa. | affirmed |
| Stewart v. Ramsay | 128 (1916) | Pitney | none | none | N.D. Ill. | affirmed |
| Sim v. Edenborn | 131 (1916) | McReynolds | none | none | 2d Cir. | reversed |
| Alder v. Edenborn | 137 (1916) | McReynolds | none | none | 2d Cir. | reversed |
| McIntyre v. Kavanaugh | 138 (1916) | McReynolds | none | none | N.Y. Sup. Ct. | affirmed |
| Chesapeake and Ohio Railway Company v. McLaughlin | 142 (1916) | McReynolds | none | none | W. Va. Cir. Ct. | reversed |
| Great Northern Railway Company v. Capital Trust Company | 144 (1916) | McReynolds | none | none | Minn. | reversed |
| New York Central Railroad Company v. Beaham | 148 (1916) | McReynolds | none | none | Mo. App. Ct. | reversed |
| Hutchinson Ice Cream Co. v. Iowa | 153 (1916) | Brandeis | none | none | multiple | affirmed |
| Kane v. New Jersey | 160 (1916) | Brandeis | none | none | N.J. | affirmed |
| Baltimore and Ohio Railroad Company v. Whitacre | 169 (1916) | Brandeis | none | none | Md. | affirmed |
| Kryger v. Wilson | 171 (1916) | Brandeis | none | none | N.D. | affirmed |
| United States v. Merchants' and Manufacturers Traffic Association of Sacramento | 178 (1916) | Brandeis | none | none | N.D. Cal. | reversed |
| United States v. Northern Pacific Railroad Company | 190 (1916) | Clarke | none | none | 8th Cir. | affirmed |
| Cissna v. Tennessee | 195 (1916) | White | none | none | Tenn. | continued |
| Lovato v. New Mexico | 199 (1916) | White | none | none | N.M. | affirmed |
| Goshen Manufacturing Company v. H.A. Myers Manufacturing Company | 202 (1916) | McKenna | none | none | 7th Cir. | reversed |
| United States v. Pennsylvania Railroad Company | 208 (1916) | McKenna | none | none | W.D. Pa. | affirmed |
| Detroit United Railway Company v. Michigan | 238 (1916) | Pitney | none | Clarke | Mich. | reversed |
| Vandalia Railroad Company v. Public Service Commission | 255 (1916) | Pitney | none | none | Ind. | affirmed |
| Minerals Separation, Ltd. v. Hyde | 261 (1916) | Clarke | none | none | 9th Cir. | reversed |
| Long Sault Development Company v. Call | 272 (1916) | Clarke | none | none | N.Y. Sup. Ct. | dismissed |
| Ex parte Indiana Transportation Company | 281 (1916) | White | none | none | N.D. Ill. | continued |
| Chicago, Terre Haute and Southeastern Railway Company v. Anderson | 283 (1916) | McKenna | none | none | Ind. | affirmed |
| Louisville and Nashville Railroad Company v. Ohio Valley Tie Company | 288 (1916) | Holmes | none | none | Ky. | reversed |
| Illinois Central Railroad Company v. Peery | 292 (1916) | Holmes | none | none | Minn. | reversed |
| Baltimore and Ohio Railroad Company v. Wilson | 295 (1916) | Holmes | none | none | Ill. App. Ct. | affirmed |
| Pennsylvania Railroad Company v. Stineman Coal Mining Company | 298 (1916) | VanDevanter | none | none | Pa. | reversed |
| Erie Railroad Company v. Welsh | 303 (1916) | Pitney | none | none | Ohio | affirmed |
| Williams v. Cobb | 307 (1916) | Clarke | none | none | 2d Cir. | affirmed |
| Clark Distilling Company v. Western Maryland Railway Company | 311 (1917) | White | none | none | D. Md. | affirmed |
| Chicago, Milwaukee and St. Paul Railway Company v. State Public Utilities Commission | 333 (1917) | McKenna | none | none | Ill. | affirmed |
| Crane v. Johnson | 339 (1917) | McKenna | none | none | S.D. Cal. | affirmed |
| McNaughton v. Johnson | 344 (1917) | McKenna | none | none | S.D. Cal. | affirmed |
| Adamson v. Gilliland | 350 (1917) | Holmes | none | none | 8th Cir. | reversed |
| Minneapolis and St. Louis Railway Company v. Winters | 353 (1917) | Holmes | none | none | Minn. | affirmed |
| Savings Bank of Danbury v. Loewe | 357 (1917) | Holmes | none | none | 2d Cir. | affirmed |
| Hill v. Reynolds | 361 (1917) | VanDevanter | none | none | Okla. | affirmed |
| Gasquet v. Lapeyre | 367 (1917) | VanDevanter | none | none | La. | dismissed |
| Dickson v. Luck Land Company | 371 (1917) | VanDevanter | none | none | Minn. | affirmed |
| Lake Shore and Michigan Southern Railway Company v. Clough | 375 (1917) | Pitney | none | none | Ind. | affirmed |
| Harnage v. Martin | 386 (1917) | Pitney | none | none | Okla. | affirmed |
| Baker v. Baker Eccles and Company | 394 (1917) | Pitney | none | none | Ky. | affirmed |
| Newark Natural Gas and Fuel Company v. City of Newark | 405 (1917) | Pitney | none | none | Ohio | affirmed |
| Louisville Bridge Company v. United States | 409 (1917) | Pitney | none | none | W.D. Ky. | affirmed |
| Knauth, Nachod and Kuhne v. Latham and Company | 426 (1917) | McReynolds | none | none | multiple | affirmed |
| Furness, Withy and Company, Ltd. v. Yang-Tsze Insurance Association, Ltd. | 430 (1917) | McReynolds | none | none | 2d Cir. | dismissed |
| Williams v. City of Chicago | 434 (1917) | McReynolds | none | none | N.D. Ill. | affirmed |
| Dean v. Davis | 438 (1917) | Brandeis | none | none | 4th Cir. | affirmed |
| Western Transit Company v. A.C. Leslie and Company, Ltd. | 448 (1917) | Brandeis | none | none | N.Y. Sup. Ct. | reversed |
| Chaloner v. Sherman | 455 (1917) | Brandeis | none | none | 2d Cir. | affirmed |
| Illinois Central Railroad Company v. Williams | 462 (1917) | Clarke | none | none | Miss. | affirmed |
| Berry v. Davis | 468 (1917) | Holmes | none | none | S.D. Iowa | reversed |
| Caminetti v. United States | 470 (1917) | Day | none | McKenna | multiple | affirmed |
| Von Baumbach v. Sargent Land Company | 503 (1917) | Day | none | none | 8th Cir. | reversed |
| Thomas Cusack Company v. City of Chicago | 526 (1917) | Clarke | none | none | Ill. | affirmed |
| Atlantic Coast Line Railroad Company v. Mims | 532 (1917) | Clarke | none | none | S.C. | dismissed |
| United States v. American-Asiatic Steamship Company | 537 (1917) | White | none | none | S.D.N.Y. | reversed |
| Hall v. Geiger-Jones Company | 539 (1917) | McKenna | none | none | S.D. Ohio | reversed |
| Caldwell v. Sioux Falls Stock Yards Company | 559 (1917) | McKenna | none | none | D.S.D. | reversed |
| Merrick v. Halsey and Company | 568 (1917) | McKenna | none | none | E.D. Mich. | reversed |
| Herbert v. Shanley Company | 591 (1917) | Holmes | none | none | 2d Cir. | reversed |
| Sevilleta La Joya Grant v. Belen Land Grant | 595 (1917) | VanDevanter | none | none | N.M. | affirmed |
| Second National Bank v. First National Bank | 600 (1917) | Day | none | none | Ohio Super. Ct. | dismissed |
| Chesapeake and Ohio Railway Company v. Public Service Commission | 603 (1917) | VanDevanter | none | none | W. Va. | affirmed |
