= Harriet Reynolds Krauth Spaeth =

American hymnwriter

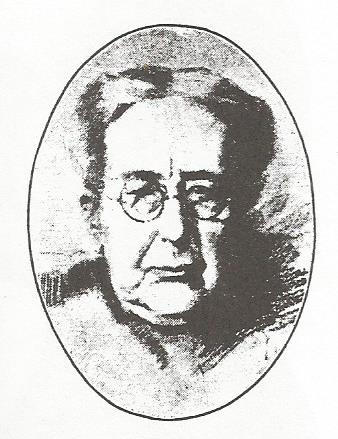
- Born: Harriet Reynolds Krauth; September 21, 1845; Baltimore, Maryland
- Died: May 5, 1925 (aged 79); Philadelphia, Pennsylvania
- Other names: Harriet R. K. Spaeth, Harriett Spaeth
- Occupation: Hymn writer
- Children: 3, including Sigmund Spaeth
- Parent: Charles Porterfield Krauth
- Relatives: Charles Philip Krauth (grandfather); John Duncan Spaeth (stepson)

Harriet Reynolds Krauth Spaeth (September 21, 1845 – May 5, 1925) was an American organist, translator, and hymn writer.

== Early life ==
Harriet Reynolds Krauth was born in Baltimore, the daughter of Charles Porterfield Krauth and Susan Reynolds Krauth. Her mother died when Harriet was young. Her father was a theologian, a prolific hymn translator, and vice-provost at the University of Pennsylvania. Her grandfather Charles Philip Krauth was president of Gettysburg College. She attended the Philadelphia High School for Girls.

== Career ==
Spaeth was the longtime organist at St. Stephen's Lutheran Church in Philadelphia. She was the music editor of Lutheran Church Book with Music (1872), and wrote articles for church publications. She wrote or translated the lyrics to more than two dozen hymns. She is best known as the writer of English lyrics to "Lo, How a Rose E'er Blooming". Other hymns written or translated by Spaeth include "As Each Happy Christmas Dawns on Earth Again", "Behold a Branch is Growing", "Church Bells Ring, Sweet Birds Sing", "Glory to God Upon His Throne", "God Crowned Thee, Lord", "Herr Dir sei Lob und Preis", "I am Jesus's Little Lamb, Therefore Glad and Gay I am", "I will Take the Path", "Jehovah Thee to Praise", "Let Me Go, Let Me Go, Lord, to Me Thy Presence Show", "Lo, on a Mount a Tree Doth Stand", "Lord in the Kingdom of Thy Grace", "Lord Jesus Christ, my Savior Blest", "Lord, Who Can be With Thee Compared", "O Jesus, Holy Child Thou Art", "O Sing, All Ye Lands, With a Jubilant Voice", "O Son of God in Coeternal Might", "Oh, Sing to the Lord, Make a Jubilant Noise!", "Praise ye the Lord, in Simple Joyous Measure", "Thy Little Ones, Dear Lord, Are We", "Whom Jesus Loves, Whom Jesus Loves", and "Ye Lands, to the Lord, Make a Jubilant Noise."

She wrote a biography of her husband, and translated his writings from German. She also helped write a biography of her father, and translated two books, The Deaconess and Her Works, and Pictures from the Life of Hans Sachs. She supported the Lankenau Hospital, and the Lutheran Orphans' Home in Germantown, Pennsylvania. She donated her father's library to the Lutheran Theological Seminary in Philadelphia.

== Personal life ==
In 1880, Krauth married Adolph Spaeth, a German-born Lutheran minister, as his second wife. He died in 1910. They had three sons and one daughter together; one son died in infancy, another son Reynold Albrecht Spaeth became a medical researcher, and another son Sigmund Spaeth became a noted musicologist. Her daughter Carola Spaeth Hauschka became a portrait artist and pianist, and a friend of Albert Einstein's.

Spaeth died in 1925, at the age of 79, in Philadelphia. In 2013 Concordia University Chicago published a short biography of Harriet R. K. Spaeth, titled Prelude and Fugue on the Life of Harriet Reynolds Krauth Spaeth, by Robert D. Hawkins.
