= United States v. Oppenheimer =

- Supreme Court of the United States

Argued October 19, 1916 Decided December 4, 1916
- Full case name: United States v. Oppenheimer, et al.
- Citations: 242 U.S. 85 (more) 37 S. Ct. 68; 61 L. Ed. 161; 1916 U.S. LEXIS 1531; 3 A.L.R. 516

Case history
- Prior: On error from District Court for Southern District of New York.
- Subsequent: None

Holding
- A criminal charge that has been adjudicated upon by a court having jurisdiction to hear and determine it, is final as to the matter so adjudicated upon, and may be pleaded in bar to any subsequent prosecution for the same offense.

Court membership
- Chief Justice Edward D. White Associate Justices Joseph McKenna · Oliver W. Holmes Jr. William R. Day · Willis Van Devanter; Mahlon Pitney · James C. McReynolds; Louis Brandeis · John H. Clarke

Case opinion
- Majority: Holmes, joined by unanimous

Laws applied
- U.S. Const. Amendment V, Criminal Appeals Act

United States v. Oppenheimer, 242 U.S. 85 (1916), was a landmark Supreme Court decision applying the common law concept of res judicata (literally: the thing is decided) to criminal law cases.

== Prior history ==
On error from the United States District Court for the Southern District of New York:

The defendant and others were indicted for a conspiracy to conceal assets from a trustee in bankruptcy. The defendant Oppenheimer set up a previous adjudication upon a former indictment for the same offense that it was barred by the one-year statute of limitations in the bankruptcy act for offenses against that act; an adjudication since held to be wrong in another case. This defense was presented in four forms entitled respectively, demurrer, motion to quash, plea in abatement, and plea in bar. After motion by the Government that the defendant be required to elect which of the four he would stand upon he withdrew the last-mentioned two, and subsequently the court granted what was styled the motion to quash, ordered the indictment quashed and discharged the defendant without day. The Government brings this writ of error treating the so-called motion to quash as a plea in bar, which in substance it was.

== Holding ==
The holding, as delivered by Justice Holmes:

The quashing of a bad indictment is no bar to a prosecution upon a good one, but a judgment for the defendant upon the ground that the prosecution is barred goes to his liability as matter of substantive law and one judgment that he is free as matter of substantive law is as good as another. A plea of the statute of limitations is a plea to the merits, and however the issue was raised in the former case, after judgment upon it, it could not be reopened in a later prosecution.... Where a criminal charge has been adjudicated upon by a court having jurisdiction to hear and determine it, that adjudication, whether it takes the form of an acquittal or conviction, is final as to the matter so adjudicated upon, and may be pleaded in bar to any subsequent prosecution for the same offense. In this respect the criminal law is in unison with that which prevails in civil proceedings.

== Rules of law applied ==
A "motion to quash" an indictment, based upon a former adjudication that a previous indictment for the same offense was barred by the statute of limitations, held, in substance, a plea in bar.

Under the Criminal Appeals Act of March 2, 1907, c. 2564, 34 Stat. 1246, the right to review decisions and judgments sustaining special pleas in bar is not limited to cases in which the decisions or judgments are based upon the invalidity or construction of the statutes upon which the indictments are founded.

A plea of the statute of limitations is a plea to the merits.

A judgment for defendant that the prosecution is barred by limitations goes to his liability in substantive law; and, in whatever form the issue was raised, such a judgment may be interposed as a conclusive bar to another prosecution for the same offense.

The Fifth Amendment, in providing that no one should be twice put in jeopardy, was not intended to supplant the fundamental principle of res judicata in criminal cases.

== See also ==
- Res judicata
- Double jeopardy
- Due process
- List of United States Supreme Court cases, volume 242
