= American Society of Composers, Authors and Publishers =

Non-profit performance-rights organization

- Trade name: ASCAP (1914–present)
- Type: Not-for-profit
- Founded: February 13, 1914; 112 years ago
- Founders: Irving Berlin; Victor Herbert; Louis Hirsch; Raymond Hubbell; Silvio Hein; Gustave Kerker; Glen MacDonough; George Maxwell; Jay Witmark; Nathan Burkan; Jean Schwartz
- Headquarters: New York City, U.S.
- Key people: Paul Williams (president); Elizabeth Matthews (CEO)
- Website: www.ascap.com

The American Society of Composers, Authors and Publishers (ASCAP) (/ˈæskæp/) is an American not-for-profit performance-rights organization (PRO) that collectively licenses the public performance rights of its members' musical works to venues, broadcasters, and digital streaming services (music stores).

ASCAP collects licensing fees from users of music created by ASCAP members, then distributes them back to its members as royalties. In effect, the arrangement is the product of a compromise: when a song is played, the user does not have to pay the copyright holder directly, nor does the music creator have to bill a radio station for use of a song.

In 2024, ASCAP collected approximately US$1.84 billion in revenue, distributed approximately US$1.7 billion in royalties to rightsholders, and maintained a registry of approximately 20 million works. The organization had approximately 1 million members as of 2024.

ASCAP has drawn negative attention for attempting to enforce licensing fees when songs are used in informal occasions such as campfire singing and open mic nights. It has also been criticized for its high lack of transparency in its operations, and for retaining some royalties brought in from its membership rather than paying them out to the artists.

== History ==
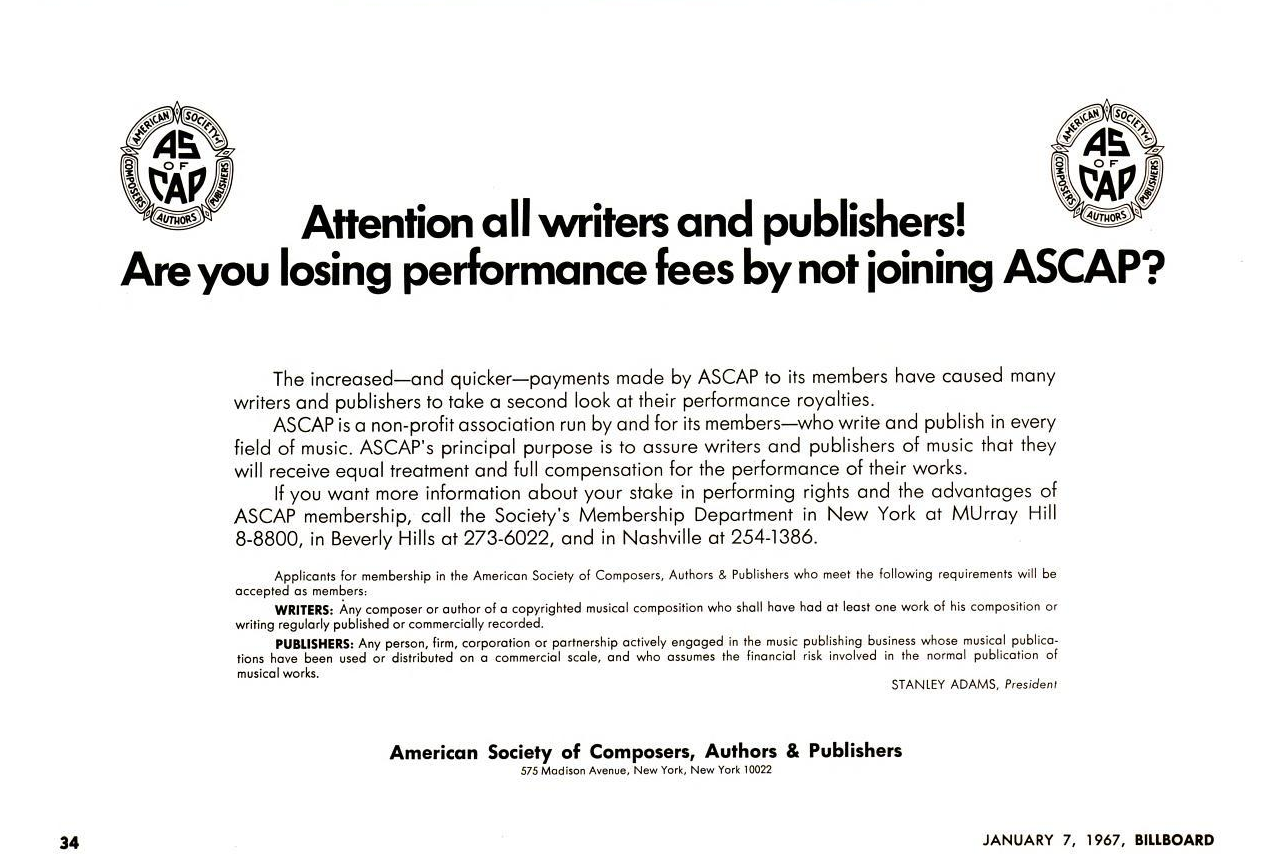
ASCAP trade advertisement, Billboard January 7, 1967

ASCAP was founded on February 13, 1914, by Victor Herbert, together with composers George Botsford, Silvio Hein, Irving Berlin, Louis Hirsch, John Raymond Hubbell, Gustave Kerker, and Jean Schwartz; lyricist Glen MacDonough; publishers George Maxwell (who served as its first president) and Jay Witmark and copyright attorney Nathan Burkan in New York City, to protect the copyrighted musical compositions of its members, who were mostly writers and publishers associated with Tin Pan Alley. ASCAP's earliest members included the era's most active songwriters, George M. Cohan, Rudolf Friml, Otto Harbach, Jerome Kern, John Philip Sousa, Alfred Baldwin Sloane, James Weldon Johnson, Robert Hood Bowers and Harry Tierney. Subsequently, many other prominent songwriters became members. Composers who could not read and write musical notation were ineligible for membership. This requirement, since dropped, excluded many songwriters in such genres as country. However, an exception was made to admit Irving Berlin.

In 1917, the United States Supreme Court ruled in favor of ASCAP in Herbert v. Shanley Co. The lawsuit, brought by Herbert, contended that the owner of Shanley's Restaurant in New York City had infringed on Herbert's copyright of Sweethearts by playing music from the play in the restaurant without permission or compensation for Herbert. Shanley argued that because there was no entrance fee for the restaurant performing the music, the performance was not making a profit and therefore did not require compensation for Herbert. The unanimous decision on the lawsuit, written by associate justice Oliver Wendell Holmes Jr., held that any performance of music for profit, including profits tangentially related to the performance, such as the sale of food and drink, required compensation for the original creators of the music. The decision legitimized ASCAP's continued existence and allowed the organization to more proactively seek compensation for its members.

In 1919, ASCAP and the Performing Rights Society of Great Britain (since 1997 known as PRS for Music), signed the first reciprocal agreement for the representation of each other's members' works in their respective territories. Today, ASCAP has global reciprocal agreements and licenses the U.S. performances of hundreds of thousands of international music creators.

=== Advent of radio ===
The advent of radio in the 1920s brought an important new source of income for ASCAP. The organization initially offered low licensing fees to foster a partnership between the fledgling medium and ASCAP; however, the licensing fees increased 900 percent between 1931 and 1939. ASCAP said the increases were due to radio curtailing the ability of its members to make money through other venues, such as sheet music and record sales, and decreasing how long hit songs remained hits.

In 1940, Florence Price became the first African-American woman member of ASCAP.

Also in 1940, when ASCAP tried to triple its license fees, radio broadcasters prepared to resist their demands by enforcing a boycott of ASCAP, and inaugurating a competing royalty agency, Broadcast Music, Inc. (BMI). During a ten-month period lasting from January 1 to October 29, 1941, no music licensed by ASCAP (1,250,000 songs) was broadcast on NBC and CBS radio stations. Instead, the stations played regional music and styles (like rhythm and blues or country) that had been rejected by ASCAP. Upon the conclusion of litigation between broadcasters and ASCAP in October 1941, ASCAP settled for a lower fee than they had initially demanded.

In 1941, an antitrust lawsuit brought by the United States Department of Justice resulted in ASCAP and BMI being governed under consent decrees that required both organizations to offer blanket licenses of their catalogs to all at rates negotiated between the parties or set by a federal judge.

=== Membership expands ===
ASCAP's membership diversified further in the 1940s, bringing along jazz and swing greats. In the 1940s, it was common for ASCAP and BMI to send out field representatives to sign new songwriters and music publishing companies, as the firms were not household names; one such ASCAP employee was Loring Buzzell, who later formed the music publishing company Hecht-Lancaster & Buzzell Music.

Differences in BMI's structure, including providing advance payments on songs, and an early embrace of country, rhythm and blues, and rock and roll led to an increase in the organization's market share in the 1940s and 1950s. In 1953, ASCAP filed an antitrust lawsuit against BMI, and instigated a congressional investigation of BMI in 1956. ASCAP lobbied Congress for laws that would bar broadcasters from owning BMI stock in 1958, and provided the impetus to launch payola investigations at the end of the decade. ASCAP and BMI settled an antitrust lawsuit in 1962.

In the 1950s and 1960s, television was introduced as a new revenue stream for ASCAP, one that maintains its importance today. With the birth of FM radio, new ASCAP members came on board. During this period, ASCAP also initiated a series of lawsuits to recover the position they lost during the boycott of 1941, without success.

The early 1960s folk music revival, led by ASCAP member Bob Dylan (later switched to SESAC) made ASCAP a major player in that genre. Dylan's expansion into rock music later that decade gave ASCAP a foothold in that genre. At the same time, ASCAP member Shapiro, Bernstein & Co. started having country hits for ASCAP.

By 1970, a new generation of ASCAP board members decided to launch a campaign to attract more songwriters and music publishers away from BMI. The campaign led to Motown Records switching most of its music publishing from BMI to ASCAP in 1971.

In June 2009, ASCAP sued AT&T and Verizon Wireless in a case that generated considerable public attention over the sale of musical ringtones in an effort to get additional revenue from the sale of ringtones. The organization said that ringtones played in public constituted a performance of a copyrighted work, which required additional payment. Critics worried ASCAP might seek to hold consumers responsible for a ringtone public performance, which ASCAP said it would not do. AT&T, Verizon, and the Electronic Frontier Foundation (EFF) disagreed with ASCAP's claims, with the EFF filing an amicus curiae brief with the United States District Court for the Southern District of New York, contending that ringtones playing in public were no different than consumers listening to a car radio with the windows down and did not constitute a performance. The Court dismissed the suit in October 2009, with judge Denise Cote noting that the suit did not demonstrate ringtones playing in public spaces constituted copyright infringement.

ASCAP licenses over 11,500 local commercial radio stations, more than 2500 non-commercial radio broadcasters and hundreds of thousands of "general" licensees (bars, restaurants, theme parks, etc.). It maintains reciprocal relationships with nearly 40 foreign PROs across six continents, and licenses billions of public performances worldwide each year.

== Reception ==
In 1995, ASCAP requested royalty payments from the American Camp Association for public performances at its camps. Following public backlash, ASCAP said it only meant to "demand a fee for performances by professional musicians at large resorts", and returned the fees paid. However, it has drawn negative attention for cracking down on licensing fees on other occasions as well, such as when it demanded that open mic events need to pay licensing (even if most or all of the songs are original).

ASCAP has also been criticized for its extremely non-transparent operations, including the refusal to release attendance records for board members, the notes from board meetings, and the reasoning behind their weighting formulas which determine how much money a song or composition earns for use on television or radio.

In response to its 2009 lawsuit, critics worried that ASCAP may seek to hold consumers responsible for a ringtone public performance.

Further controversies arose involving ASCAP in 2009 and 2010. The organization requested that some websites pay licensing fees on embedded YouTube videos, even though YouTube already pays licensing fees, and demanded payment from Amazon.com and iTunes for 30-second streaming previews of music tracks, which traditionally does not require a license, being considered a promotional vehicle for song sales.

In June 2010, ASCAP sent letters to its members soliciting donations to fight entities that support weaker copyright restrictions, such as Public Knowledge, the Electronic Frontier Foundation, and Creative Commons, creating notable controversy as many argued that these licenses are a form of copyright and offer the artist an extra choice. Lawrence Lessig, a co-founder of Creative Commons, responded stating that they are not aiming to undermine copyright, and invited ASCAP for a public debate. The offer was turned down by ASCAP's Paul Williams.

It was reported in April 2020, that songwriters and composers were facing delays in receiving royalties. This was delivered via a memo to hundreds of thousands of members from CEO Elizabeth Matthews, who said the global disruption of the COVID-19 pandemic was to blame. This raised contention as those critical of the announcement wondered why the pandemic at that time would affect payments related to the third quarter of 2019. Further, it was revealed that publishers were still being paid royalties on time.

== See also ==
- BMI
- Copyright collective
- United States v. ASCAP
- PRS for Music, a British music copyright collective

== Bibliography ==
- ASCAP (1948) The ASCAP Biographical Dictionary, 1st ed., 483 p. ("1,890 writers, 309 publishers: 1,887 biographies") .
- ASCAP (1952) The ASCAP Biographical Dictionary, 2nd ed., 636 p. ("2,297 writers (including 203 women), 453 publishers: ? biographies") LCCN 52-7038
- ASCAP (1966) The ASCAP Biographical Dictionary, 3rd ed., 845 p. ("8,500 writers, 2,800 publishers: 5,238 biographies') LCCN 66-20214
- ASCAP (1980) The ASCAP Biographical Dictionary, 4th ed., 589 p. ("? writers, 7,000 publishers: 8,200 biographies") LCCN 80-65351, ISBN 0-8352-1283-1 .
