= Maple Hill, Kansas =

City in Wabaunsee County, Kansas

- City
- Location within Wabaunsee County and Kansas

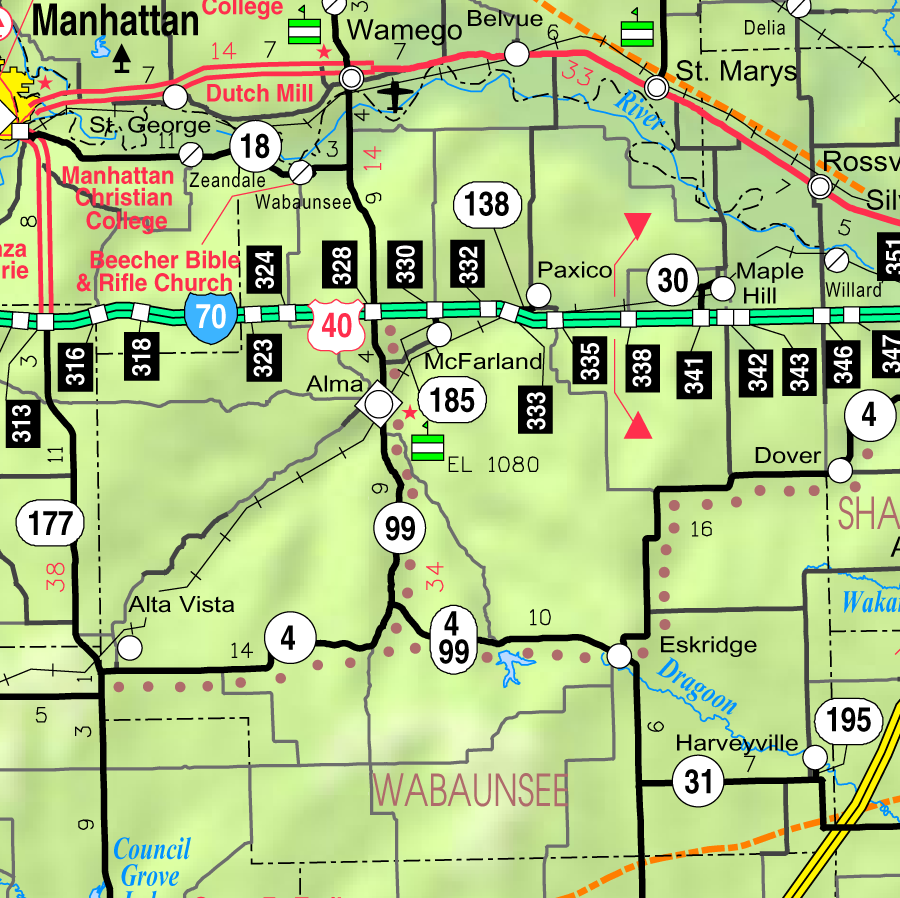
- KDOT map of Wabaunsee County (legend)
- Coordinates: 39°05′08″N 96°01′41″W
- Country: United States
- State: Kansas
- County: Wabaunsee
- Founded: 1882
- Incorporated: 1908
- Named for: Maple trees on a hill

Government
  - Type: Mayor–Council

Area
  - Total: 0.24 sq mi (0.63 km^{2})
  - Land: 0.24 sq mi (0.63 km^{2})
  - Water: 0 sq mi (0.00 km^{2})
- Elevation: 968 ft (295 m)

Population (2020)
  - Total: 631
  - Density: 2,600/sq mi (1,000/km^{2})
- Time zone: UTC-6 (CST)
  - Summer (DST): UTC-5 (CDT)
- ZIP Code: 66507
- Area code: 785
- FIPS code: 20-44500
- GNIS ID: 2395839

Maple Hill is a city in Wabaunsee County, Kansas, United States. As of the 2020 census, the population of the city was 631.

== History ==
Maple Hill was founded about 1882. It was named from a grove of maple trees growing upon an elevation.

In 1887, the Chicago, Kansas and Nebraska Railway built a main line from Topeka through Maple Hill to Herington.

Three fires erupted in Maple Hill between 1900 and 1901.

The Chicago, Kansas and Nebraska Railway was foreclosed in 1891 and taken over by Chicago, Rock Island and Pacific Railway, which shut down in 1980 and reorganized as Oklahoma, Kansas and Texas Railroad, merged in 1988 with Missouri Pacific Railroad, merged in 1997 with Union Pacific Railroad. Most locals still refer to this railroad as the "Rock Island".

== Geography ==
Maple Hill is located at 39°5′3″N 96°1′37″W (39.084041, -96.027071). According to the United States Census Bureau, the city has a total area of 0.25 square miles (0.65 km^{2}), all land.

== Demographics ==
Historical population
Census	Pop.	Note	%±
1910	277		—
1920	255		−7.9%
1930	256		0.4%
1940	247		−3.5%
1950	176		−28.7%
1960	244		38.6%
1970	327		34.0%
1980	381		16.5%
1990	406		6.6%
2000	469		15.5%
2010	620		32.2%
2020	631		1.8%
U.S. Decennial Census

Maple Hill is part of the Topeka, Kansas Metropolitan Statistical Area.

=== 2020 census ===
The 2020 United States census counted 631 people, 207 households, and 145 families in Maple Hill. The population density was 2,596.7 per square mile (1,002.6/km^{2}). There were 219 housing units at an average density of 901.2 per square mile (348.0/km^{2}). The racial makeup was 87.96% (555) white or European American (86.69% non-Hispanic white), 0.95% (6) black or African-American, 0.95% (6) Native American or Alaska Native, 0.0% (0) Asian, 0.0% (0) Pacific Islander or Native Hawaiian, 0.63% (4) from other races, and 9.51% (60) from two or more races. Hispanic or Latino of any race was 6.34% (40) of the population.

Of the 207 households, 42.0% had children under the age of 18; 59.9% were married couples living together; 20.8% had a female householder with no spouse or partner present. 25.6% of households consisted of individuals and 15.9% had someone living alone who was 65 years of age or older. The average household size was 2.9 and the average family size was 3.5. The percent of those with a bachelor's degree or higher was estimated to be 10.6% of the population.

36.3% of the population was under the age of 18, 7.1% from 18 to 24, 23.0% from 25 to 44, 19.3% from 45 to 64, and 14.3% who were 65 years of age or older. The median age was 30.2 years. For every 100 females, there were 107.6 males. For every 100 females ages 18 and older, there were 108.3 males.

The 2016–2020 5-year American Community Survey estimates show that the median household income was $76,875 (with a margin of error of +/- $13,095) and the median family income was $84,464 (+/- $11,796). Males had a median income of $44,375 (+/- $10,003) versus $29,688 (+/- $6,678) for females. The median income for those above 16 years old was $36,389 (+/- $9,640). Approximately, 3.4% of families and 4.0% of the population were below the poverty line, including 3.4% of those under the age of 18 and 11.1% of those ages 65 or over.

=== 2010 census ===
As of the census of 2010, there were 620 people, 210 households, and 152 families residing in the city. The population density was 2,480.0 inhabitants per square mile (957.5/km^{2}). There were 217 housing units at an average density of 868.0 per square mile (335.1/km^{2}). The racial makeup of the city was 95.8% White, 0.2% African American, 0.3% Native American, 0.2% Asian, 0.3% from other races, and 3.2% from two or more races. Hispanic or Latino of any race were 3.9% of the population.

There were 210 households, of which 43.8% had children under the age of 18 living with them, 59.5% were married couples living together, 10.0% had a female householder with no husband present, 2.9% had a male householder with no wife present, and 27.6% were non-families. 23.8% of all households were made up of individuals, and 12.4% had someone living alone who was 65 years of age or older. The average household size was 2.95 and the average family size was 3.62.

The median age in the city was 30.8 years. 38.2% of residents were under the age of 18; 4.8% were between the ages of 18 and 24; 26.3% were from 25 to 44; 19.2% were from 45 to 64; and 11.6% were 65 years of age or older. The gender makeup of the city was 49.5% male and 50.5% female.

=== 2000 census ===
As of the census of 2000, there were 469 people, 182 households, and 133 families residing in the city. The population density was 1,880.6 inhabitants per square mile (726.1/km^{2}). There were 187 housing units at an average density of 749.8 per square mile (289.5/km^{2}). The racial makeup of the city was 96.80% White, 1.49% African American, 0.21% Native American, and 1.49% from two or more races. Hispanic or Latino of any race were 1.07% of the population.

There were 182 households, out of which 35.7% had children under the age of 18 living with them, 63.2% were married couples living together, 7.7% had a female householder with no husband present, and 26.4% were non-families. 24.2% of all households were made up of individuals, and 11.5% had someone living alone who was 65 years of age or older. The average household size was 2.58 and the average family size was 3.04.

In the city, the population was spread out, with 29.0% under the age of 18, 4.9% from 18 to 24, 31.3% from 25 to 44, 19.4% from 45 to 64, and 15.4% who were 65 years of age or older. The median age was 35 years. For every 100 females, there were 95.4 males. For every 100 females age 18 and over, there were 94.7 males.

The median income for a household in the city was $46,875, and the median income for a family was $53,393. Males had a median income of $38,750 versus $26,667 for females. The per capita income for the city was $17,048. About 9.3% of families and 6.6% of the population were below the poverty line, including 6.5% of those under age 18 and 11.6% of those age 65 or over.

== Education ==
The community is served by Wabaunsee USD 329 public school district. USD 329 was formed by school unification that consolidated Alma, Maple Hill, McFarland, and Paxico. Wabaunsee High School is located in Alma. The Wabaunsee High School mascot is Wabaunsee Chargers.

Maple Hill High School was closed through school unification.

== Notable people ==
- Joseph Norman Dolley, Kansas banking commissioner who promoted the nation's first state blue sky law, which Kansas passed in 1911.
