= Pillsbury Crossing =

Natural limestone slab in Kansas, USA

Coordinates: 39.129720°N 96.440555°W

Pillsbury Crossing is a natural limestone slab that was used by pioneers to cross Deep Creek. The ledge terminates in a waterfall in Riley County, Kansas, USA. The waterfall is about 40 feet (12 m) wide and has a drop of around 5 feet (1.5 m). Below Pillsbury Crossing, Deep Creek flows into the Kansas River.

The waterfall is named for Josiah Pillsbury, a Free-State settler in Kansas Territory who homesteaded near the crossing in 1855. Pillsbury was a member of the Free-State Topeka Legislature and the failed Leavenworth Constitutional Convention.

The site is part of Pillsbury Crossing Wildlife Area.

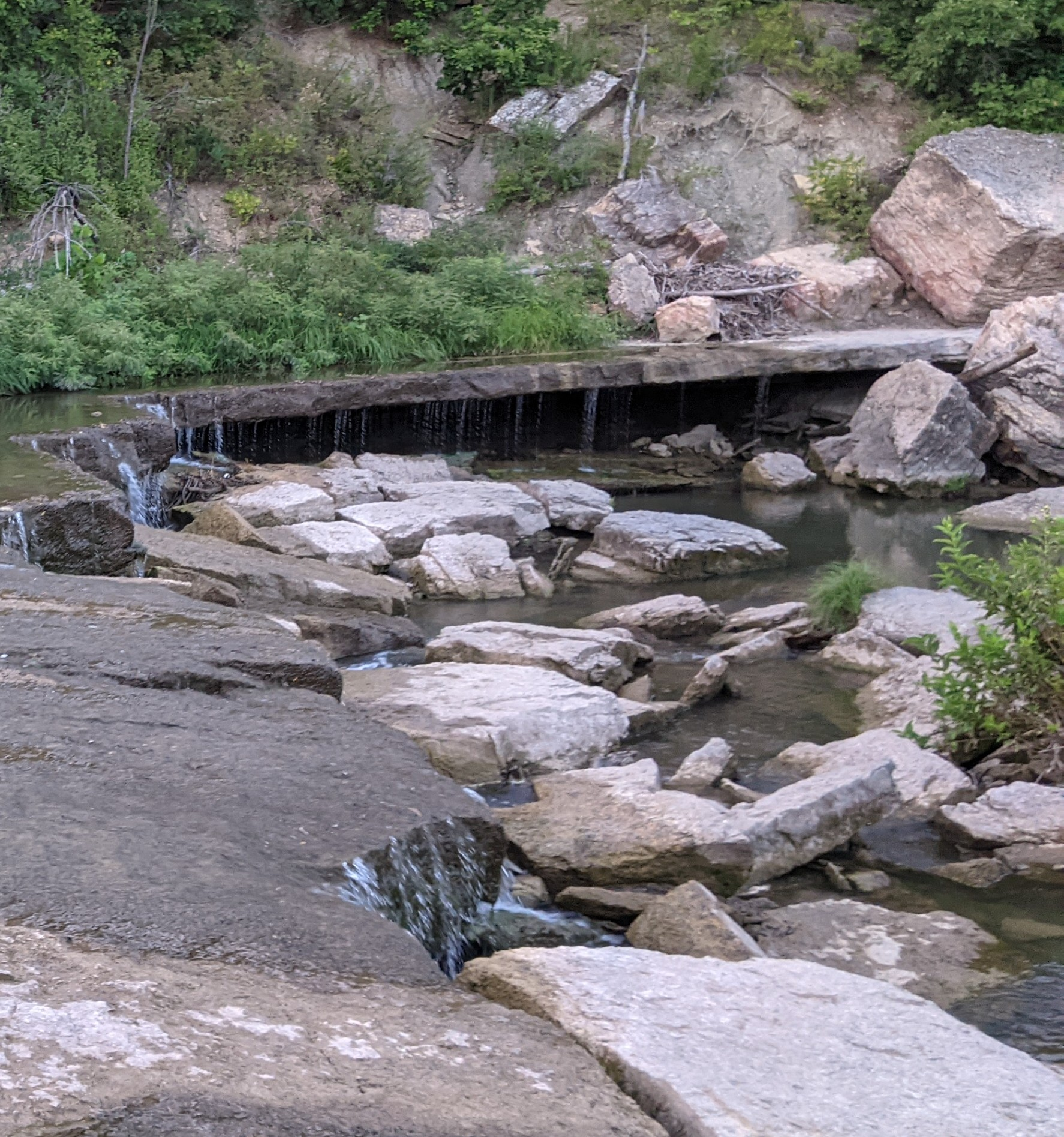
Pillsbury Crossing Waterfall, August 2021
