= Charles Porterfield Krauth =

American Lutheran minister, educator, and theologian (1823–1883)

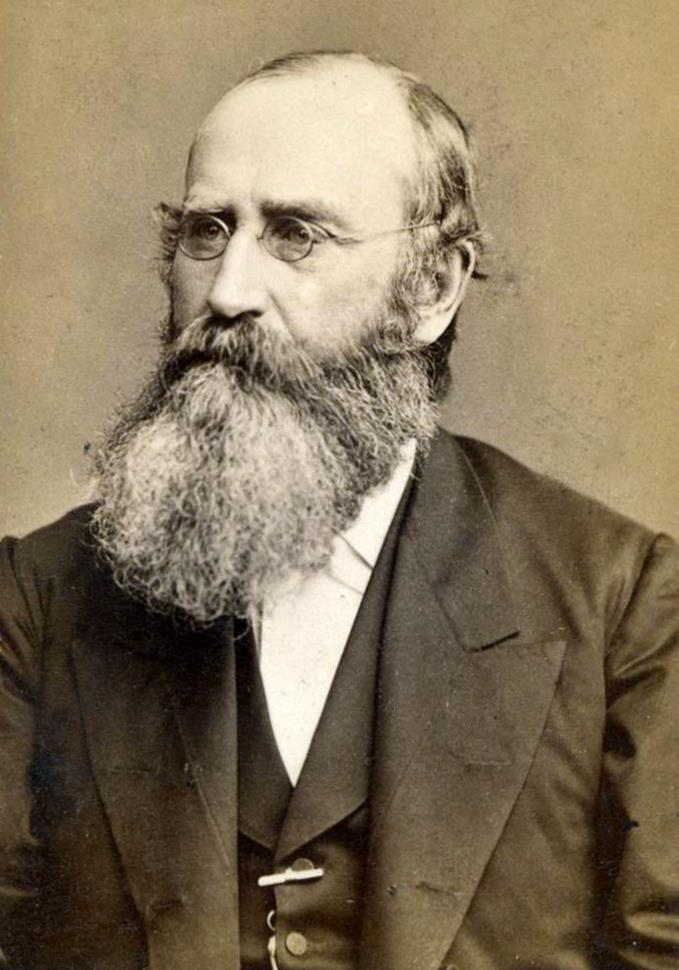
- Born: 17 March 1823; Martinsburg, Virginia
- Died: 2 January 1883 (aged 59); Philadelphia, Pennsylvania
- Education: Lutheran Theological Seminary at Gettysburg (1841)
- Children: Harriet Reynolds Krauth Spaeth
- Parent: Charles Philip Krauth
- Relatives: Sigmund Spaeth (grandson)

Ecclesiastical career
- Religion: Lutheranism
- Writings: The Conservative Reformation and its Theology
- Offices held: Editor of The Lutheran; Professor at Lutheran Theological Seminary at Philadelphia

Signature
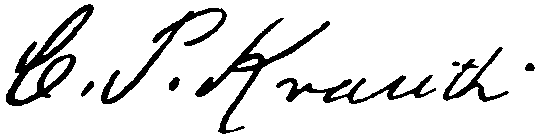

Charles Porterfield Krauth (March 17, 1823 – January 2, 1883) was an American neo-Lutheran minister, educator, and theologian. He was a leading figure in the Christian revival of the Lutheran Confessions connected to Lutheran churches in the United States.

== Education and parish ministry ==
Krauth was born in Martinsburg, Virginia to the Lutheran clergyman Charles Philip Krauth. He graduated from Gettysburg College (then Pennsylvania College) in 1839. His father served as the first president of the school (1834–1850). Two years later, Krauth studied at the Lutheran Theological Seminary at Gettysburg.

From 1841 to 1852, he served as a Lutheran minister at the congregations in Baltimore, Maryland, Martinsburg, Virginia, and Winchester, Virginia. During the winter of 1853–1854, for three months he served the Dutch Reformed congregation in Saint Thomas in the Virgin Islands, where he was visiting on account of his wife's illness. Krauth later published a sketch of this visit entitled A Winter and Spring in the Danish West Indies. Upon returning to Pennsylvania, Krauth was called to lead the congregations in Pittsburgh, from 1855 to 1859, and Philadelphia, from 1859 to 1861.

In 1864, he was elected as a member to the American Philosophical Society.

== The General Council ==
Conflict between the American Lutherans and the leaders of the confessional Lutheran revival led to a schism. In 1864, Krauth was asked to lead the new seminary in Philadelphia, which was founded by churches of the Pennsylvania Ministerium to rival the seminary in Gettysburg (today known as the Lutheran Theological Seminary at Philadelphia). In 1867, Krauth and his schoolmate, William Passavant, founded the General Council of the Evangelical Lutheran Church in America. The General Council had seven regional bodies which had withdrawn from the General Synod.

During Krauth's lifetime, the Lutheran Theological Seminary at Philadelphia was located at Franklin Square. In 1889, it moved to Mount Airy. In 1908, its new library there was dedicated as the Krauth Memorial Library in memory of Krauth.

As the first professor of systematic theology at the new seminary, Krauth was at the intellectual center of the reform movement. He wrote its Fundamental Articles of Faith and Church Polity, as well as the constitutions for its congregations. His liturgical scholarship guided the formation of General Council worship materials. From 1868, Krauth also served as professor of moral philosophy at the University of Pennsylvania, and from 1873 as vice-provost.

== Literary works ==
- The Conservative Reformation and its Theology, his most significant work (Philadelphia, 1872)
- Tholuck's Commentary on the Gospel of John, translator (1859)
- Christian Liberty in Relation to the Usages of the Evangelical Lutheran Church Maintained and Defended (1860)
- William Fleming's Vocabulary of Philosophy, editor, contributing an introduction and additions (1860; 2d ed.: (Vocabulary of the Philosophical Sciences), enlarged, New York, 1877)
- The Augsburg Confession, translator, contributing a historical introduction, notes, and index (Philadelphia, 1868)
- "Infant Baptism and Infant Salvation in the Calvinistic System," a review of Hodge's Systematic Theology (1874)
- Ulrici's Review of Strauss (1874)
- Berkeley's Principles, Prolegomena, Notes of Ueberweg, and Original Annotations (1874)
- Chronicle of the Augsburg Confession (1878)
