= Blue sky law =

Securities law in the US

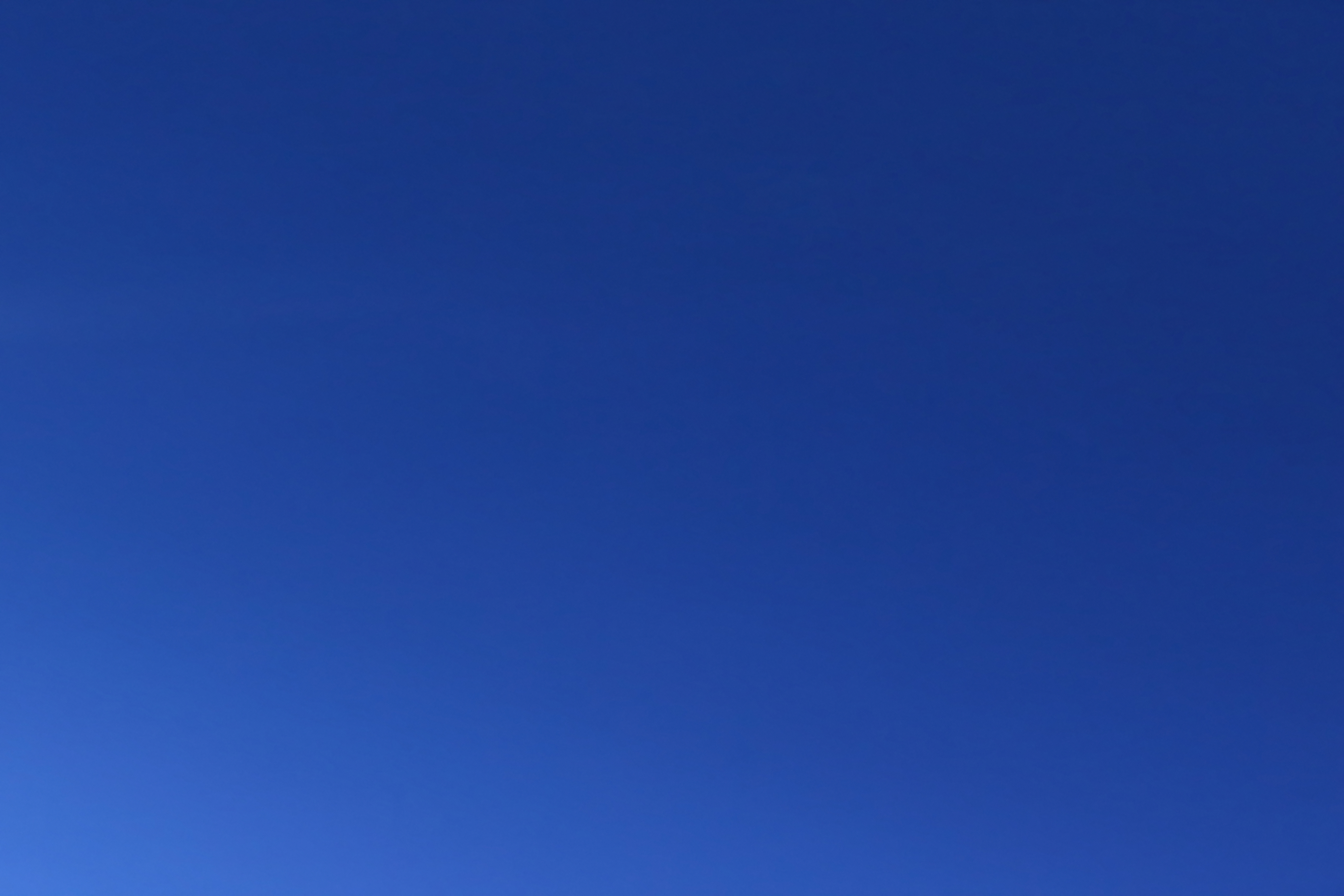
The emptiness of blue sky was a metaphor for the fraudulent basis of some securities that laws named after it sought to prevent by requiring disclosures to investors.

A blue sky law is a state law in the United States that regulates the offering and sale of securities to protect the public from fraud. Though the specific provisions of these laws vary among states, they all require the registration of all securities offerings and sales, as well as of stockbrokers and brokerage firms. Each state's blue sky law is administered by its appropriate regulatory agency, and most also provide private causes of action for private investors who have been injured by securities fraud.

The first blue sky law was enacted in Kansas in 1911 at the urging of its banking commissioner, Joseph Norman Dolley, and served as a model for similar statutes in other states. Between 1911 and 1933, 47 states adopted blue-sky statutes (Nevada was the lone holdout). Today, the blue sky laws of 40 of the 50 states are patterned after the Uniform Securities Act of 1956. Historically, the federal securities laws and the state blue sky laws complemented and often duplicated one another. Much of the duplication, especially with regard to registration of securities and the regulation of brokers and advisors, was largely preempted by the Securities and Exchange Commission with the National Securities Markets Improvement Act of 1996 (NSMIA). This act, however, left some regulation of investment advisors and much of the fraud litigation under state jurisdiction. In 1998, state law securities fraud claims were expressly preempted by the Securities Litigation Uniform Standards Act from being raised in lawsuits that were effectively class actions by investors, even if not filed as class actions.

== Origin of term in securities context ==
Its earliest cited use by the US Supreme Court was in an opinion by Justice Joseph McKenna in Hall v. Geiger-Jones Co., 242 U.S. 539 (1917), a case that addressed the constitutionality of state securities laws. As a result, McKenna is sometimes erroneously cited as the inventor of the term. An earlier documented use of the term dates to 1910 when Joseph Norman Dolley employed it while voicing support for the Kansas statute, and McKenna's own opinion in Hall attributes the term to an unnamed earlier source:

The name that is given to the law indicates the evil at which it is aimed, that is, to use the language of a cited case, "speculative schemes which have no more basis than so many feet of 'blue sky'"; or, as stated by counsel in another case, "to stop the sale of stock in fly-by-night concerns, visionary oil wells, distant gold mines and other like fraudulent exploitations." Even if the descriptions be regarded as rhetorical, the existence of evil is indicated, and a belief of its detriment; and we shall not pause to do more than state that the prevention of deception is within the competency of government and that the appreciation of the consequences of it is not open for our review.

Dolley, railing against "blue sky merchants" while he pushed for passage of the Kansas statute in 1910, observed that certain fraudulent investments were backed by nothing but the blue skies of Kansas. The Oxford English Dictionary has a cited use dating to 1906. Also, The New York Times (and other national newspapers) frequently reported on the blue sky laws as various states began to enact them between 1911 and 1916. The newspapers expressly used the term blue sky to describe such laws.

== See also ==
- National Instrument 43-101, Canadian standards of disclosure for mineral properties, intended to help protect investors from fraudulent representation.
- Penny stock
- Securities market participants (United States)
- United States securities regulation
