= Herbert v. Shanley Co. =

- Supreme Court of the United States

Argued January 10, 1917 Decided January 22, 1917
- Full case name: Herbert v. Shanley Co.
- Citations: 242 U.S. 591 (more) 37 S. Ct. 232; 61 L. Ed. 511

Holding
- Hotels and restaurants that perform music must compensate composers, even if the venue is not separately charging patrons to hear the music.

Court membership
- Chief Justice Edward D. White Associate Justices Joseph McKenna · Oliver W. Holmes Jr. William R. Day · Willis Van Devanter; Mahlon Pitney · James C. McReynolds; Louis Brandeis · John H. Clarke

Herbert v. Shanley Co., 242 U.S. 591 (1917), was a United States Supreme Court case in which the Court held hotels and restaurants that perform music must compensate composers, even if the venue is not separately charging patrons to hear the music.

The decision legitimized ASCAP, a group founded to collect license fees from businesses that wanted to play performance recordings by its members.

Because this case determined that playing music at the restaurants was an indirect way of profiting from the copyrighted music, it raised the question of what sort of indirect use would be too indirect to constitute infringement. Broadly speaking, this question was not anticipated by the Copyright Act and judges considered this a thorny problem. Nevertheless, courts made decisions indicating that commercial radio broadcasts and uses in advertising were sufficiently direct.
