= Karlheinz Krauth =

German civil engineer (1936–2020)

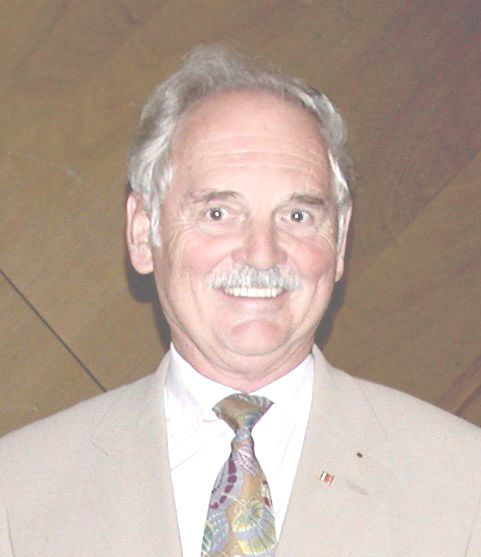
- Krauth in 2004
- Born: 2 June 1936; Bad Cannstatt, Germany
- Died: 9 October 2020 (aged 84); Degerloch, Germany
- Education: Universität Stuttgart
- Engineering career
- Institutions: Universität Stuttgart
- Significant advance: Urban drainage and flood control, wastewater treatment
- Awards: List

Karlheinz Krauth (2 June 1936 – 9 October 2020) was a German civil engineer and professor at University of Stuttgart. He was appointed professor in 1987 and was head of the Department of Sanitary Engineering at the Institute for Sanitary Engineering, Water Quality and Solid Waste Management (ISWA) at the University of Stuttgart until his retirement in October 2000. His main interests included the field of urban drainage and flood control as well as the biological and advanced wastewater treatment.

== Life ==
Krauth was born in Bad Cannstatt on June 2, 1936. He studied civil engineering at the Technical University of Stuttgart from 1956 to 1961, specializing in sanitary engineering. His first job as head of the sewage and composting plant in Baden-Baden already introduced him to the problems of wastewater engineering. This practical orientation was also evident later in all his research activities.

In 1971, he received his Ph.D. from the University of Stuttgart under the supervision of Karl-Heinz Hunken and Baldefried Hanisch on the topic of "Der Abfluss und die Verschmutzung des Abflusses in Mischwasserkanalisationen bei Regen" (The discharge and pollution of the discharge in combined sewer systems during rainfall). For this work he received the Karl Imhoff Award in 1971. In 1972 he became head of the sanitary engineering department at the aforementioned institute in Stuttgart, and in 1974 he was appointed academic councillor.

In 1987, the position was transferred to the professorship for wastewater technology. The 15 dissertations initiated by Krauth range from stormwater treatment, bulking sludge, nitrogen and phosphorus removal, anaerobic wastewater treatment and sludge digestion to the membrane activated sludge process. Together with Carl-Heinz Burchard and Dieter Groche, Krauth was involved in the first generation of teachers in the sewage treatment plant neighborhoods as well as in the operator training courses at different levels. For these honorary activities he received the Golden Badge of Honor of the ATV - Abwassertechnische Vereinigung (German Association for Water, Wastewater and Waste, today: DWA) in 1983 and the "Bundesverdienstkreuz der Bundesrepublik Deutschland" (Order of Merit of the Federal Republic of Germany) in 1995.

Krauth died on October 9, 2020, in Degerloch.

== Work and achievements ==
With his doctoral thesis, he laid the foundation for the construction of retention tanks in combined sewer systems, which is taken for granted today. The implementation of his research, which required huge investments on the part of municipalities, has contributed significantly to the improvement of water quality. In addition to his work on stormwater treatment in combined sewer systems, which had a significant influence on the worksheet ATV-A 128 "Richtlinien für die Bemessung und Gestaltung von Regenentlastungen in Mischwasserkanälen", his field of research covered the entire area of wastewater treatment and sludge treatment. He was also active in numerous ATV technical committees and working groups. He contributed to three editions of ATV-A 131 "Bemessung von Belebungsanlagen" and was also speaker of the ATV main committee "Gewässerschutz und Abwasserreinigung" from 1987 to 1999. The introduction of denitrification is also inextricably linked to the name of Karlheinz Krauth.

His work in the field of membrane filtration, especially as ultramembrane filtration became the cornerstone of a 1987 patented process for biological wastewater treatment, which he developed jointly with Karl F. Staab. In this process, a pressurized bioreactor and a membrane filter or ultrafiltration device are connected to enable an increase in the concentration of the biologically active sludge in the system, making it possible to achieve extremely high degrees of purification. The system resulting from his work was one of the first in a series of membrane bioreactor systems developed in parallel. It also became commercially successful.

Krauth was also scientific director of the conference "Stuttgarter Siedlungswasserwirtschaftliches Kolloquium" and editor of the proceedings of this conference. He also organized numerous ATV basic and skilled worker courses, at which he also lectured, and he served for twelve years as an instructor at the nation's first ATV sewage treatment plant neighborhood in Baden-Württemberg.

Shortly before his retirement, Krauth devoted himself, among other things, to the training of Chinese wastewater engineers and the operating personnel of wastewater treatment plants at the German-Chinese Training Center for Wastewater Treatment in Qingdao. He initiated the center and was very active in planning and running the courses there. In 2001, he handed over this project to his successor at ISWA, Johannes Pinnekamp.

== Honours, decorations, awards and distinctions ==
National

- 1971 Karl Imhoff Prize of DWA (German Association for Water, Wastewater and Waste)
- 1983 Badge of Honour (Ehrennadel) of DWA (German Association for Water, Wastewater and Waste)
- 1995 Order of Merit of the Federal Republic of Germany (Bundesverdienstkreuz der Republik Deutschland), mentioned in the obituary.
- 2004 Max Prüß Medal of DWA (German Association for Water, Wastewater and Waste)

== Selected published works ==
- Karlheinz Krauth (ed.): Kostenoptimierung bei der Abwasserbehandlung - 73. Siedlungswasserwirtschaftliches Kolloquium am 24.09.1998. Stuttgarter Berichte zur Siedlungswasserwirtschaft. Band 149, 1998, ISBN 978-3-486-26447-0.
- Karlheinz Krauth (ed.): Nachhaltige Wasserwirtschaft und Stand der Technik - 74. Siedlungswasserwirtschaftliches Kolloquium am 05. Oktober 1999. Stuttgarter Berichte zur Siedlungswasserwirtschaft. Band 154, 1999, ISBN 978-3-486-26478-4.
- Karlheinz Krauth (ed.): Gegenwart und Zukunft der Siedlungswasserwirtschaft - 75. Siedlungswasserwirtschaftliches Kolloquium am 10. Oktober 2000. Stuttgarter Berichte zur Siedlungswasserwirtschaft. Band 161, 2000, ISBN 978-3-486-26484-5.

== Bibliography ==
- Peter Baumann, Karlheinz Krauth, Werner Maier, Manfred Roth, Peter Maurer: Funktionsstörungen auf Kläranlagen - Praxisleitfaden für systematische Ursachensuche und Behebung von Funktionsstörungen. Deutsche Vereinigung für Wasserwirtschaft, Abwasser und Abfall, 2017, ISBN 978-3-88721-486-9
