= Charles Philip Krauth =

American clergyman

Charles Philip Krauth (7 May 1797 in Montgomery County, Pennsylvania – 30 May 1867 in Gettysburg, Pennsylvania) was a Lutheran clergyman of the United States. He was the first president of Gettysburg College (then Pennsylvania College) 1834–1850.

== Biography ==
At the age of 18, he began the study of medicine, but abandoned it for theology, and in 1819 the ministerium of Pennsylvania licensed him to preach. After holding pastorates at Martinsburg, Pennsylvania, and Shepherdstown, Virginia, he was called in 1827 to Philadelphia to take charge of the recently organized English-speaking congregation. In 1833 he was elected professor of biblical and oriental literature in the Lutheran Theological Seminary at Gettysburg, and the following year he was unanimously elected president of Pennsylvania College, also in Gettysburg. In 1850 he resigned his post as president of the college, in order to devote his time exclusively to duties in the theological seminary, where he continued to labor until his death. He was given the degree of D.D. by the University of Pennsylvania in 1837.

== Literary works ==
Krauth edited the Evangelical Review from 1850 until 1861, and, besides articles in its pages, published various discourses, including his inaugural address as president of Pennsylvania College (Gettysburg, Pa., 1834), and Discourse on the Life and Character of Henry Clay (1852). He was co-editor of the general synod's hymn-book (1828), and edited the Lutheran Sunday-School Hymn-Book (Philadelphia, 1843).

== Family ==
One of his sons, Charles Porterfield Krauth, was a noted Lutheran theologian. Another son, John Morris Krauth, joined the 26th Pennsylvania Emergency Militia in the days immediately prior to the Battle of Gettysburg, which fought a brief skirmish before fleeing from their post west of Gettysburg on June 26, 1863.
