= Shawmobile =

American motor vehicle manufacturer

Shaw Manufacturing Company
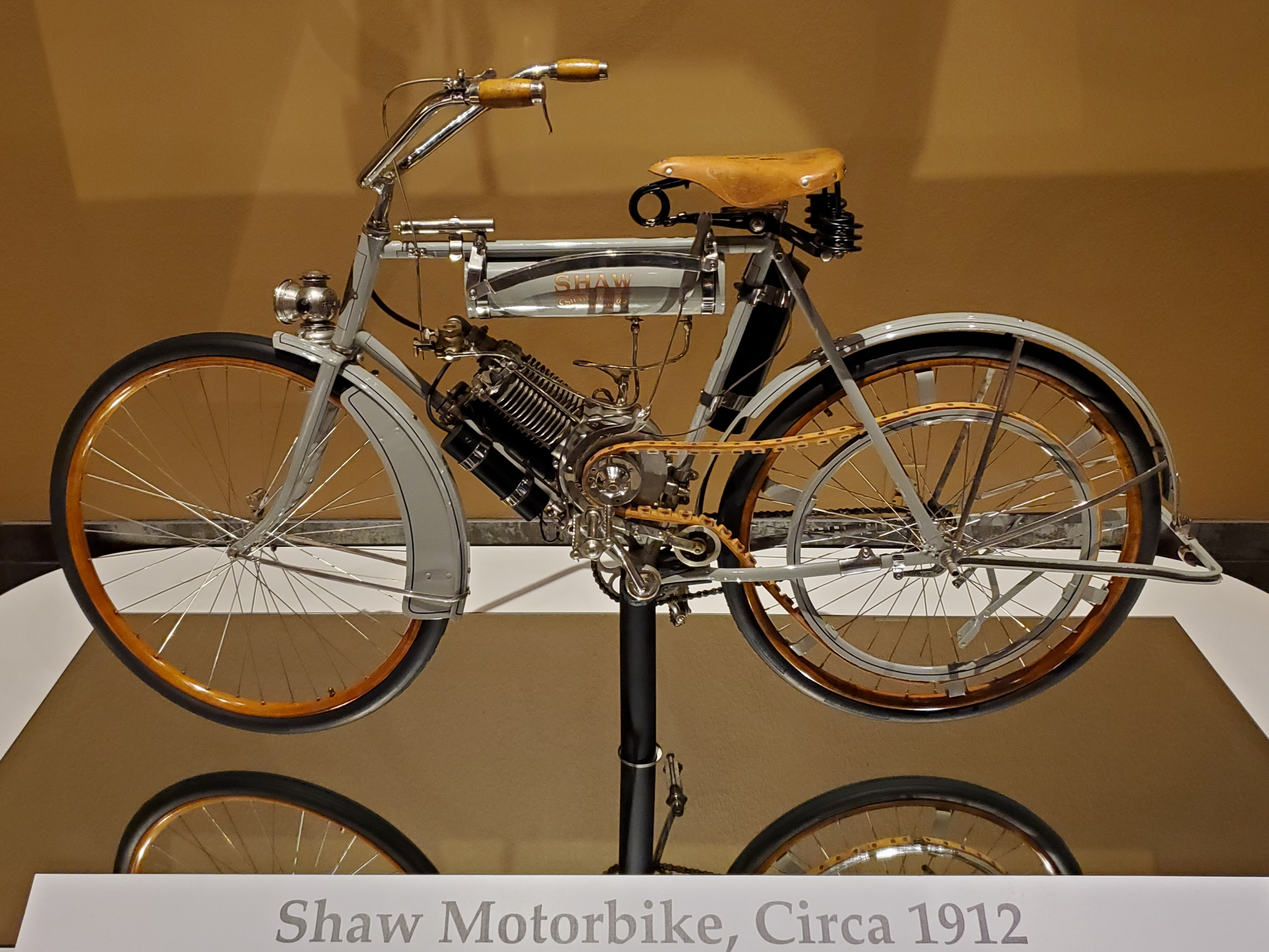
- 1912 Shaw Motorbike at the Tellus Science Museum
- Industry: Automotive, Motorcycle, Farm equipment
- Founded: 1903; 123 years ago
- Founder: Stanley W. Shaw
- Defunct: 1962; 64 years ago
- Fate: Sold
- Headquarters: Galesburg, Kansas, United States

The Shawmobile or Shaw Speedster was a small two-seat cyclecar or buckboard-type vehicle built by the Shaw Manufacturing Company in Galesburg, Kansas from 1920 to 1930

== History ==
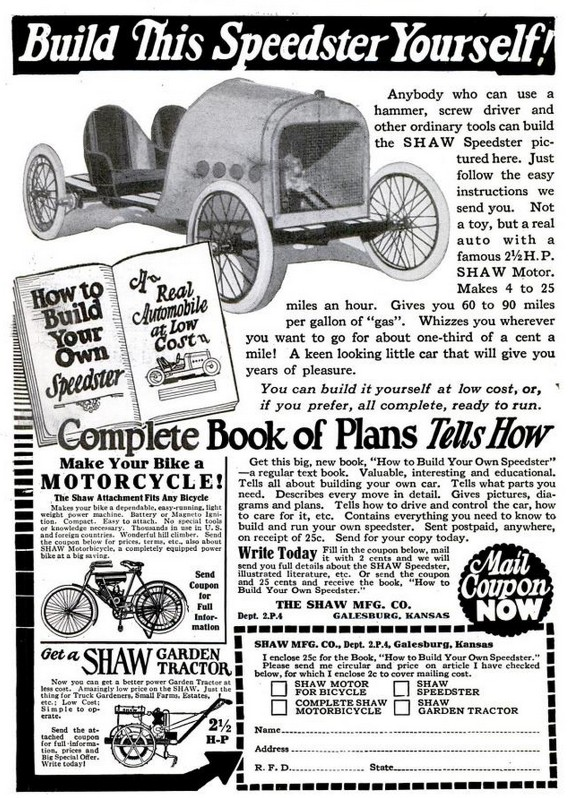
Shaw Speedster Advertising - 1924

In the nineteenth century, Stanley W. Shaw first invented his own steam engine. At the dawn of the motoring age Stanley Shaw invented his own gas engine. By 1903 the Shaw Manufacturing Company of Galesburg, Kansas advertised an engine kit for motorizing a bicycle in Popular Mechanics magazine for $90. The engine was 241 cc with dry cell battery ignition and a slip belt drive. Advertised cruising speed was 20 mph (32 km/h), with a maximum speed of 30 mph (48 km/h). By 1905 Shaw was mass-producing his engines to convert bicycles to motorcycles. By 1906 Shaw was manufacturing complete motorcycles.

To further increase sales, Shaw began selling plans to build a car to use his engine. It was a very basic cyclecar, a buckboard with a motor. The Shawmobile was powered by a front-mounted Shaw gasoline engine with belt drive to the rear wheels. Wheels were of the wire bicycle type. By 1908 Shaw built and sold complete Shawmobiles. Advertisements claim 25 mph (40 km/h) and 90 mpg with the original Shaw engine. In 1915 Shaw also redesigned the engine kit featuring an improved H-20 engine with a magneto ignition and chain drive.

Shaw redesigned the car in 1922 to look more conventional. The re-designed Shaw Speedster looked similar to the later King Midget Series 1 microcar. Most often the Shaw Speedster was sold as a kit. For those who didn't want to build it themselves, Shaw offered the car complete in a price range of $125 to $165, equivalent to $3,174 in 2025. The Shaw Speedster was produced until 1930.

Buckboard and mail order type cars were also built during the same period by the A. O. Smith Company starting in 1915. The Smith Flyer became the Briggs & Stratton Flyer, and later the Red Bug. The Lad's Car and the Motor Bob were similar cyclecars sold by mail order in the 1910s.

After 1930, Shaw continued to offer and advertise the Speedster as a do-it-yourself car. Shaw Manufacturing became one of the biggest purchasers of Briggs & Stratton engines. From the mid-twenties, the Shaw factory was busiest producing the Shaw Du-All mowers and garden tractors. Stanley Shaw continued in this activity until his retirement in 1962 when he sold his firm to the manufacturer of the Brush Hog, a rotary mower.

== See also ==
- Cyclecars
- Microcars
- Smith Flyer
- Briggs & Stratton Flyer
- Red Bug
- King Midget
- Motor Bob
- Lad's Car
