= Kimball, Kansas =

Unincorporated community in Neosho County, Kansas

- Unincorporated community
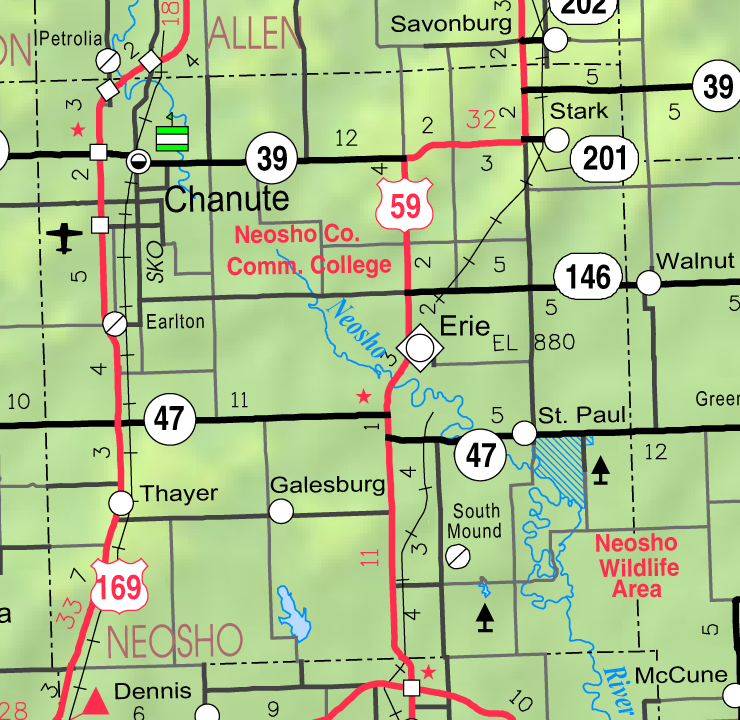
- KDOT map of Neosho County (legend)

- Location within Kansas Location within the United States
- Coordinates: 37°39′40″N 95°09′49″W
- Country: United States
- State: Kansas
- County: Neosho
- Founded: 1880s
- Platted: 1888
- Elevation: 1,043 ft (318 m)
- Time zone: UTC-6 (CST)
  - Summer (DST): UTC-5 (CDT)
- Area code: 620
- FIPS code: 20-36800
- GNIS ID: 474978

Kimball is an unincorporated community in Neosho County, Kansas, United States. The community is located next to a railroad between the cities of Erie and Stark.

== History ==
Kimball, originally spelled Kimbal, was platted in 1888.

The first post office in Kimbal was established in May 1888. The name was officially changed to Kimball (with two Ls) in 1950, and the post office closed in 1956.

The Missouri-Kansas-Texas Railroad passed through Kimball and a passenger depot previously existed in the community.

== Transportation ==
The nearest intercity bus stop is located in Chanute. Service is provided by Jefferson Lines on a route from Minneapolis to Tulsa.
