= Niagara Automobile Company (1915) =

Defunct American motor vehicle manufacturer

- Company type: Automobile manufacturer
- Industry: Automotive
- Founded: 1915; 111 years ago
- Defunct: 1916; 110 years ago
- Fate: Discontinued
- Headquarters: Buffalo, New York, United States
- Products: Automobiles
- Production output: 500 approx (1915-1916)
- Brands: Niagara, Niagara Four

Niagara Automobile Company was an American automobile manufacturer in Buffalo, New York in 1915 and 1916.

Other American automobile manufacturers that used the brand name Niagara were Niagara Automobile Company (1901) and Niagara Motor Vehicle Company, both of which had minimal, if any production. Wilson Automobile Company, used the brand Niagara and Niagara Motor Car Corporation called their automobile Lad's Car.

== History ==
The company was founded in 1915 in Buffalo, New York. It was a merger of Mutual Motor Car Company and Buffalo's largest automobile dealer, Poppenberg Motor Company. Production was contracted to Crow-Elkhart in Elkhart, Indiana. The name of the brand was Niagara with Four added to the name on some advertising.

One model, C-16 was made with a four-cylinder engine made by Lycoming. Touring cars and Roadsters were marketed both priced at $740, equivalent to $23,551 in 2025. Production ended in 1916 after about 500 automobiles were produced.
