= K-39 (Kansas highway) =

State highway in Kansas, U.S.

K-39
- K-39 highlighted in red

Route information
- Maintained by KDOT
- Length: 65.032 mi (104.659 km)

Major junctions
- West end: US-400 north of Fredonia
- US-75 in Buffalo; US-169 in Chanute; US-59 by Stark
- East end: K-7 southwest of Fort Scott

Location
- Country: United States
- State: Kansas
- Counties: Wilson, Neosho, Bourbon

Highway system
- Kansas State Highway System; Interstate; US; State; Spurs
← K-38	→ US-40

K-39 is a 65.03-mile-long (104.66 km) east–west state highway in the U.S. state of Kansas. The highway runs from U.S. Route 400 (US-400) to K-7 southwest of Fort Scott.

== Route description ==
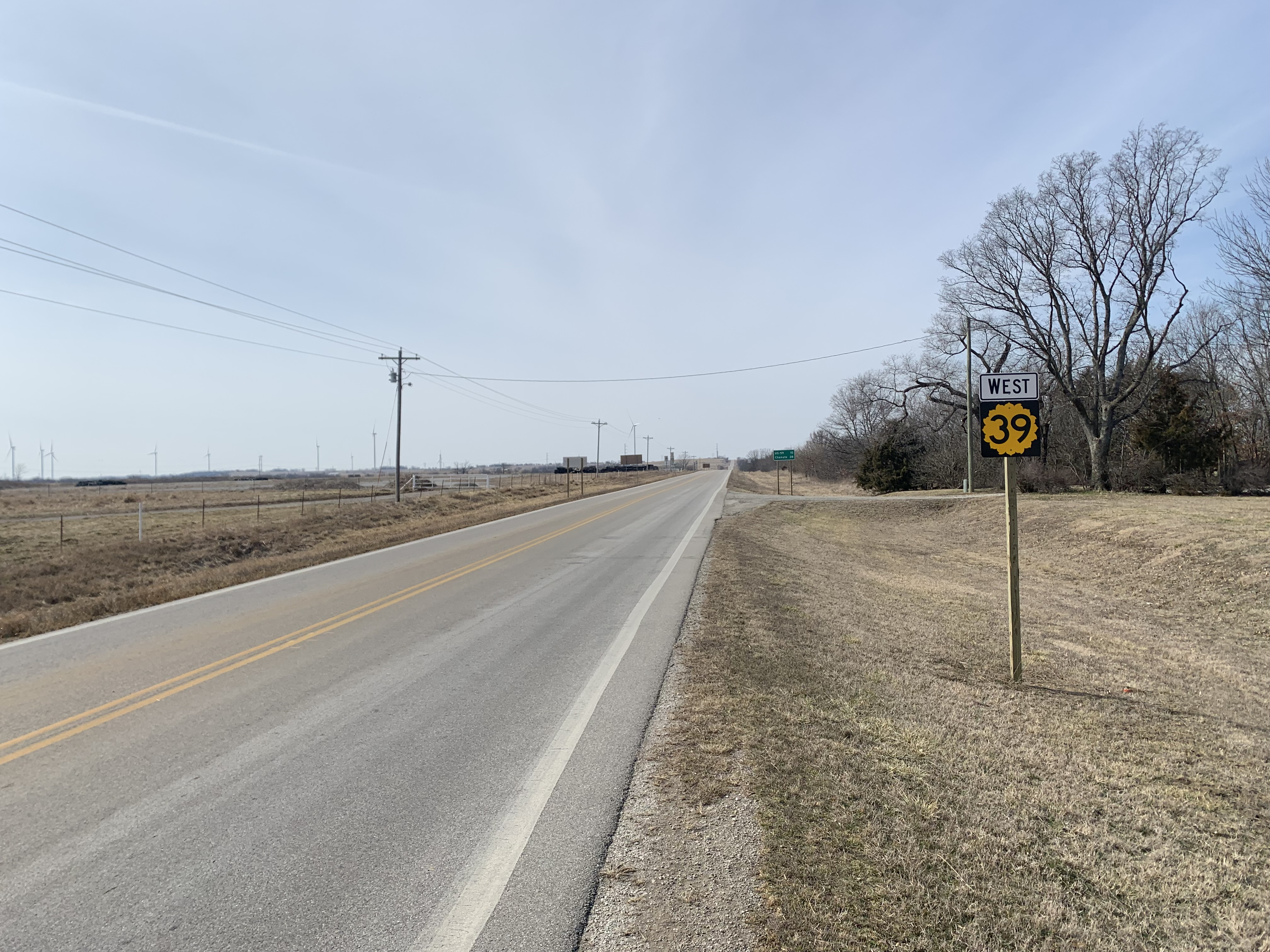
Kansas Highway 39 at junction with Kansas Highway 3, facing west

K-39 begins seven miles (11 km) north of Fredonia at U.S. Highway 400 (US-400). It travels east to Benedict, where it turns north toward Buffalo. South of town, K-39 meets US-75 and begins a short, one-mile-long (1.6 km) concurrency with the U.S. Highway. Once leaving US-75, the highway again travels east toward Chanute, where it intersects US-169. The highway continues east 12 miles (19 km) before beginning a seven-mile-long (11 km) concurrency with US-59. After briefly turning north with US-59, K-39 resumes its easterly route north of Stark. The highway shares a very short overlap with K-3 (less than one mile, 1.6 kilometers) and passes through Hiattville before meeting its eastern terminus at K-7, which completes the connection to US-69.

== History ==
K-39 has been at its current alignment since 1999. Prior to that the western terminus was located near Elk City. The portion of the route between Elk City and Fredonia are now county owned roads. Before 1956, when K-39 was modernized, a large portion of the route was unpaved and used 90 degree turns to travel northeast instead of the current diagonal alignment.

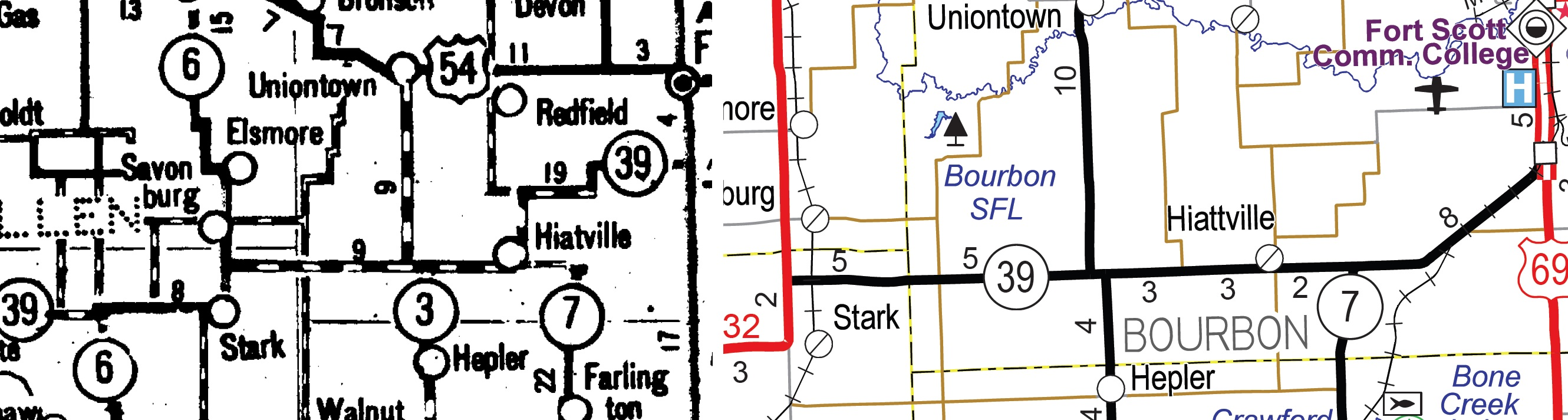
Comparison of K-39 alignments between 1945 (left) and 2015 (right). The dashed line indicates lack of pavement.

== Major Junctions ==
County	Location	mi	km	Destinations	Notes
Wilson		0.000	0.000	US-400	Western terminus; road continues south as 1650 Road
Wilson	Buffalo	14.821	23.852	US-75 north	Western end of US-75 concurrency
Wilson		15.749	25.346	US-75 south	Eastern end of US-75 concurrency
Neosho	Chanute	26.289	42.308	US-169 – Iola, Coffeyville	Diamond interchange
Neosho		39.089	62.908	US-59 south	Western end of US-59 concurrency
Neosho	Stark	46.274	74.471	US-59 north	Eastern end of US-59 concurrency
Bourbon		56.275	90.566	K-3 north	Western end of K-3 concurrency
Bourbon		56.775	91.371	K-3 south	Eastern end of K-3 concurrency
Bourbon		65.032	104.659	K-7 – Fort Scott, Girard	Eastern terminus; highway continues as K-7 north
1.000 mi = 1.609 km; 1.000 km = 0.621 mi: Concurrency terminus
