= South Mound, Kansas =

Unincorporated community in Neosho County, Kansas

- CDP
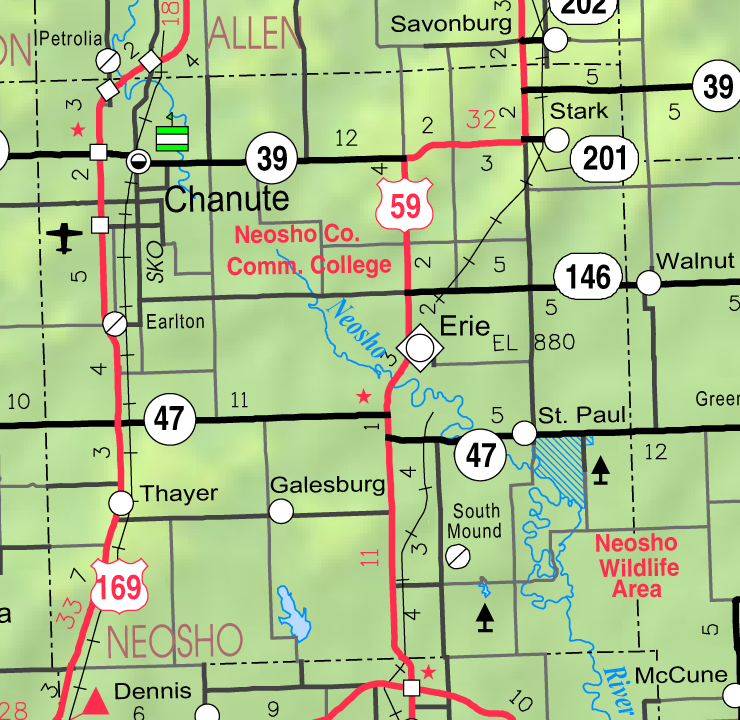
- KDOT map of Neosho County (legend)

- Location within Kansas Location within the United States
- Coordinates: 37°26′14″N 95°13′43″W
- Country: United States
- State: Kansas
- County: Neosho
- Elevation: 988 ft (301 m)

Population (2020)
  - Total: 27
- Time zone: UTC-6 (CST)
  - Summer (DST): UTC-5 (CDT)
- Area code: 620
- FIPS code: 20-66800
- GNIS ID: 469698

South Mound is a census-designated place (CDP) in Neosho County, Kansas, United States. As of the 2020 census, the population was 27.

== History ==
South Mound was located on the Missouri–Kansas–Texas Railroad. The railroad tracks were removed in 1989 following the M-K-T's merger with Missouri Pacific.

A post office was opened in South Mound in 1872, and remained in operation until it was discontinued in 1971.

== Demographics ==
Historical population
Census	Pop.	Note	%±
2020	27		—
U.S. Decennial Census

== Transportation ==
The nearest intercity bus stop is located in Chanute. Service is provided by Jefferson Lines on a route from Minneapolis to Tulsa.
