= Wilson Automobile =

Defunct American motor vehicle manufacturer

Wilson Automobile Manufacturing Company
- Company type: Automobile manufacturer
- Industry: Automotive
- Founded: 1903; 123 years ago
- Defunct: 1905; 121 years ago
- Fate: Assets acquired by La Salle-Niagara Company
- Headquarters: Wilson, New York, United States
- Brands: Niagara

Wilson Automobile Manufacturing Company was a manufacturer of automobiles in Wilson, New York between 1903 and 1905. Their automobile model was sold as the Niagara.

Other American automobile manufacturers that used the brand name Niagara were Niagara Automobile Company (1901) and Niagara Motor Vehicle Company, both of which had minimal, if any production. Niagara Automobile Company (1915) used the brand Niagara and Niagara Motor Car Corporation called their automobile Lad's Car.

== History ==
The Niagara was a runabout model that could seat 2 or 4 passengers and sold for $850, equivalent to $30,458 in 2025. The vertically mounted water-cooled single-cylinder engine, situated at the rear of the car, produced 5 hp (3.7 kW). A 2-speed sliding transmission was fitted. The steel and wood-framed car weighed 1100 lb (499 kg). Full elliptic rear suspension and semi-elliptic front suspension was fitted.

The assets of the company were purchased by the La Salle-Niagara Company in 1905. Wilson became an automobile dealership.
