= Urbana =

Urbana can refer to:

== Places ==
=== Italy ===
- Urbana, Italy

=== United States ===
- Urbana, Illinois
  - Urbana (conference), a Christian conference formerly held in Urbana, Illinois
- Urbana, Indiana
- Urbana, Iowa
- Urbana, Kansas
- Urbana, Maryland
- Urbana, Missouri
- Urbana, New York
- Urbana, Ohio
  - Urbana University

== Other uses ==
- Urbana (payment card), used for public transportation in Ljubljana, Slovenia
- University of Illinois Urbana-Champaign
- UrbanA project (urban arenas for sustainable and just cities): a three-year project, funded by the European Union, on urban sustainability and justice.

== See also ==
- Urbanna, Virginia
