= Shaw, Kansas =

Unincorporated community in Neosho County, Kansas

Coordinates: 37°36′08″N 95°19′03″W

Shaw is an unincorporated community in Neosho County, Kansas, United States.

== History ==
Shaw was founded in 1885. Throughout the twentieth century the town was served by the Atchison, Topeka and Santa Fe Railroad.

== Transportation ==
The nearest intercity bus stop is located in Chanute. Service is provided by Jefferson Lines on a route from Minneapolis to Tulsa.
