= Galesburg City =

Galesburg City can refer to:

- Galesburg, Illinois
- Galesburg, Kansas
- Galesburg, Michigan
- Galesburg, North Dakota
