= Odense (disambiguation) =

Odense is the third largest city in Denmark and capital of the island of Funen.

Odense may also refer to:

- Odense Municipality, Denmark
- Odense Boldklub, a Danish professional football club based in Odense.
- Odense County, a former Danish province
- Roman Catholic bishopric of Odense, of which it was the episcopal see
- Odense River
- Odense Fjord
- Odense Steel Shipyard also known as Odense Staalskibsværft - Lindøværftet
- Odense Airport
- Odense Classic or Odense Pilsner brewed by Albani Bryggerierne A/S
- Symphony, K. 16a (Mozart), symphony attributed to Mozart
- Odense, Kansas, an unincorporated community in the United States of America
