= Ladore, Kansas =

Coordinates: 37.405606°N 95.316994°W

Ladore is a ghost town in Neosho County, Kansas, United States.

== History ==
The community was founded sometime between 1865 and 1867, twelve miles south of present-day Erie and six miles north of Parsons, and was located in section 27 of Ladore Township. Its founding is credited to J. N. Roach, W. C. Dickerson and S. Rosa who initially settled on the name Fort Roach until it was changed to Ladore in 1869. The plat for the town was filed September 30, 1870 by the Missouri-Kansas-Texas Railroad.

According to an 1870 census, the town had a population of 839 and had grown to 1,060 by the year 1880. In 1870 the Missouri–Kansas–Texas Railroad founded Parsons, Kansas which quickly grew into a railway hub. This resulted in many citizens moving to nearby Parsons and on March 15, 1901, the Ladore post office closed as a result of the dwindling population. Today, the only remaining vestige of the town is the Ladore Cemetery that is one-half mile east of Lake Parsons.

The town is most well known for the lynching of five outlaw men (William Ryun, Patrick Starr, Patsey Riley, Richard Pitkin and Alexander Matthews) on May 11, 1870, by a group of up to 300 people after the men had robbed and beaten several members of the town and raped three teenage girls.

== See also ==
- List of ghost towns in Kansas
