= Morehead, Kansas =

Unincorporated community in Neosho County, Kansas

Coordinates: 37°23′03″N 95°30′28″W

Morehead is an unincorporated community in Neosho County, Kansas, United States.

== History ==
Morehead had a post office from the 1870s until 1954. It also had a school house, and a depot on the Leavenworth, Lawrence and Galveston Railroad.

== Transportation ==
The nearest intercity bus stop is located in Chanute. Service is provided by Jefferson Lines on a route from Minneapolis to Tulsa.
