= Erie, Kansas =

City in Neosho County, Kansas

- City and County seat
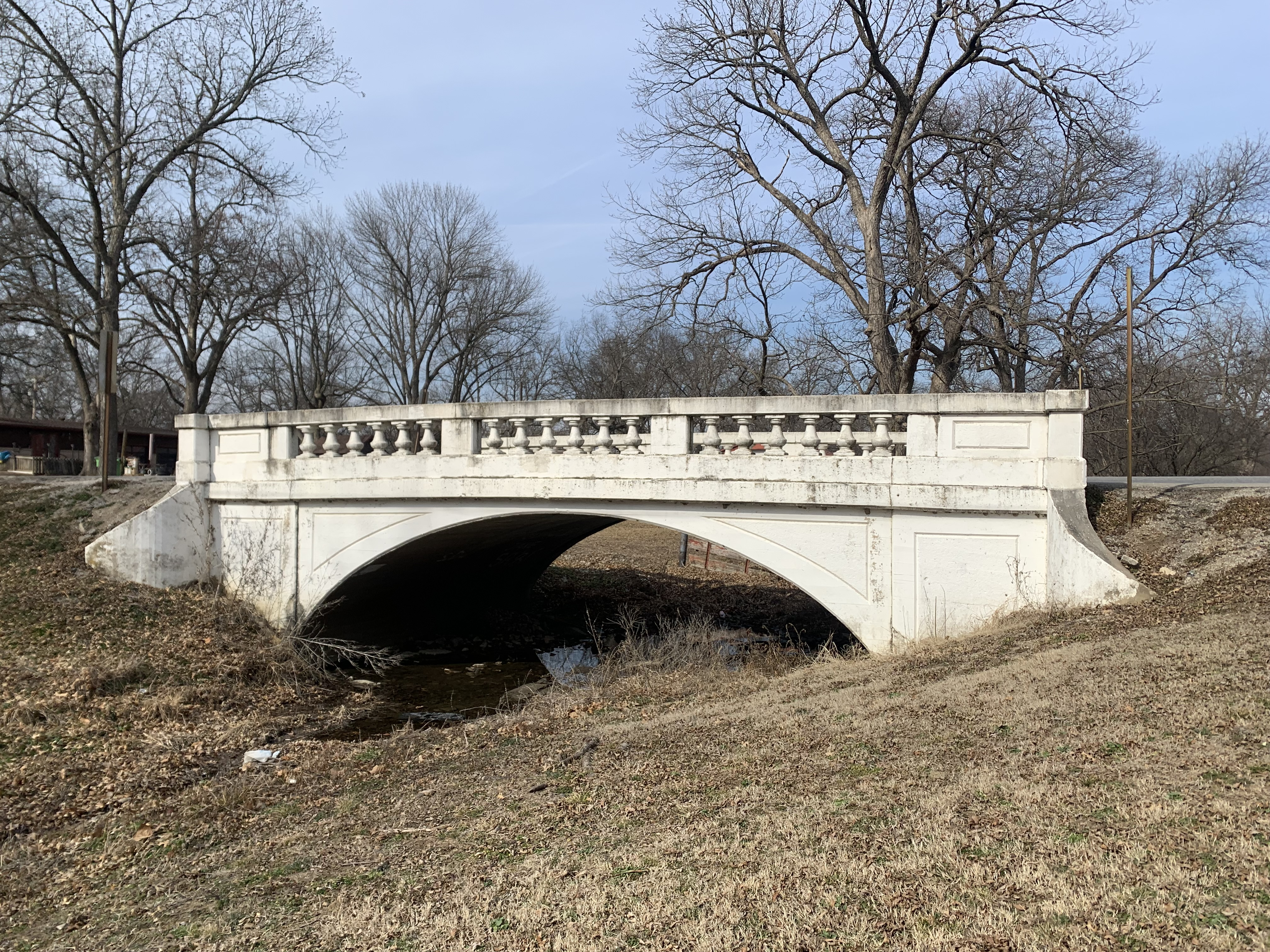
- State Street Bridge in Erie (2026)
- Nickname: Beantown USA
- Location within Neosho County and Kansas

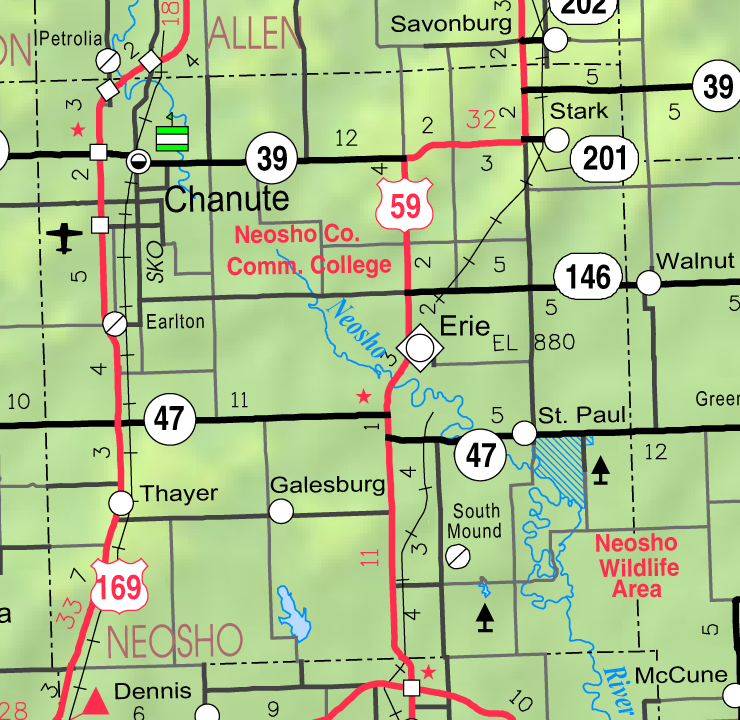
- KDOT map of Neosho County (legend)
- Coordinates: 37°34′17″N 95°14′30″W
- Country: United States
- State: Kansas
- County: Neosho
- Platted: 1866
- Incorporated: 1869

Government
  - Type: Mayor-council
  - Mayor: Lester Klingenberg

Area
  - Total: 1.27 sq mi (3.28 km^{2})
  - Land: 1.27 sq mi (3.28 km^{2})
  - Water: 0 sq mi (0.00 km^{2})
- Elevation: 889 ft (271 m)

Population (2020)
  - Total: 1,047
  - Density: 827/sq mi (319/km^{2})
- Time zone: UTC-6 (CST)
  - Summer (DST): UTC-5 (CDT)
- ZIP Code: 66733
- Area code: 620
- FIPS code: 20-21500
- GNIS ID: 2394698
- Website: ErieKS.com

Erie is a city in and the county seat of Neosho County, Kansas, United States, and situated in the valley of the Neosho River, approximately one mile northeast of the river. As of the 2020 census, the population of the city was 1,047.

== History ==
A settlement named "Erie", later referred to as "Old Erie" and "Beantown USA", was platted 2 miles (3.2 km) northwest of the present townsite, while another community, known as Crawfordsville, was started two miles northeast of the current site. In 1866, the proprietors of these two towns made a compromise to abandon the towns and combine with the settlement at the present Erie site. Four men gave 40 acres each, that butted together, out of their 160-acre shares, to create the city plat of Erie. These men were: David Bray, Luther Puckett, John Himmelwright and Peter Walter. In November of that year the Erie Town Company was formed. Each member of this company donated forty acres of land in the center of Section 32, Township 28, Range 20 east. Each member was to buy city plots and improve them.

Erie's first fire company was established in November 1866; its charter members were those men who had donated the land on which the community was built. The first log home in Erie was built in 1866, while the first businesses were built in the following year. By 1883, the city had two general stores, two blacksmith shops, one drug store, two hotels, one newspaper office, two churches, and a population of about 300.

Erie was incorporated on December 25, 1869. On December 30, the trustees met and declared Erie to be a city of the 3rd class.

In 1872, Erie was designated the county seat of Neosho County, defeating "Osage Mission" (later renamed Saint Paul) in a contentious election. After a lawsuit reached the Kansas Supreme Court, Erie retained the position of county seat.

== Geography ==
According to the United States Census Bureau, the city has a total area of 1.21 square miles (3.13 km^{2}), all land.

=== Climate ===
The climate in this area is characterized by hot, humid summers and generally mild to cool winters. According to the Köppen Climate Classification system, Erie has a humid subtropical climate, abbreviated "Cfa" on climate maps.

Climate data for Erie, KS (1991-2020 precipitation normals)Elevation: 905 feet (276 metres). Lat: 37.5743° N Lon: 95.246° W
Month	Jan	Feb	Mar	Apr	May	Jun	Jul	Aug	Sep	Oct	Nov	Dec	Year
Average precipitation inches	1.31	1.67	2.82	4.52	6.44	5.28	4.26	3.92	4.62	3.79	2.73	1.93	43.29
Average precipitation mm	33	42	72	115	164	134	108	100	117	96	69	49	1,099
Source: NOAA

== Demographics ==
Historical population
Census	Pop.	Note	%±
1870	418		—
1880	270		−35.4%
1890	1,176		335.6%
1900	1,111		−5.5%
1910	1,300		17.0%
1920	1,167		−10.2%
1930	1,184		1.5%
1940	1,286		8.6%
1950	1,296		0.8%
1960	1,309		1.0%
1970	1,414		8.0%
1980	1,415		0.1%
1990	1,276		−9.8%
2000	1,211		−5.1%
2010	1,150		−5.0%
2020	1,047		−9.0%
U.S. Decennial Census

=== 2020 census ===
The 2020 United States census counted 1,047 people, 418 households, and 284 families in Erie. The population density was 825.7 per square mile (318.8/km^{2}). There were 482 housing units at an average density of 380.1 per square mile (146.8/km^{2}). The racial makeup was 89.49% (937) white or European American (87.87% non-Hispanic white), 0.57% (6) black or African-American, 0.48% (5) Native American or Alaska Native, 0.96% (10) Asian, 0.0% (0) Pacific Islander or Native Hawaiian, 1.24% (13) from other races, and 7.26% (76) from two or more races. Hispanic or Latino of any race was 4.39% (46) of the population.

Of the 418 households, 27.3% had children under the age of 18; 51.2% were married couples living together; 25.8% had a female householder with no spouse or partner present. 26.8% of households consisted of individuals and 14.8% had someone living alone who was 65 years of age or older. The average household size was 2.4 and the average family size was 3.1. The percent of those with a bachelor's degree or higher was estimated to be 21.9% of the population.

22.6% of the population was under the age of 18, 7.7% from 18 to 24, 22.8% from 25 to 44, 24.9% from 45 to 64, and 21.9% who were 65 years of age or older. The median age was 42.2 years. For every 100 females, there were 94.6 males. For every 100 females ages 18 and older, there were 101.0 males.

The 2016–2020 5-year American Community Survey estimates show that the median household income was $46,339 (with a margin of error of +/- $9,924) and the median family income was $57,917 (+/- $8,418). Males had a median income of $38,750 (+/- $12,599) versus $19,817 (+/- $2,776) for females. The median income for those above 16 years old was $28,867 (+/- $3,906). Approximately, 9.4% of families and 14.4% of the population were below the poverty line, including 24.6% of those under the age of 18 and 4.7% of those ages 65 or over.

=== 2010 census ===
As of the census of 2010, there were 1,150 people, 463 households, and 312 families residing in the city. The population density was 950.4 inhabitants per square mile (367.0/km^{2}). There were 540 housing units at an average density of 446.3 per square mile (172.3/km^{2}). The racial makeup of the city was 96.4% White, 0.3% African American, 1.1% Native American, 0.1% Asian, 1.3% from other races, and 0.8% from two or more races. Hispanic or Latino of any race were 5.6% of the population.

There were 463 households, of which 30.7% had children under the age of 18 living with them, 55.1% were married couples living together, 6.9% had a female householder with no husband present, 5.4% had a male householder with no wife present, and 32.6% were non-families. 28.7% of all households were made up of individuals, and 17.3% had someone living alone who was 65 years of age or older. The average household size was 2.42 and the average family size was 2.89.

The median age in the city was 41.5 years. 24.9% of residents were under the age of 18; 8% were between the ages of 18 and 24; 20.9% were from 25 to 44; 25.5% were from 45 to 64; and 20.5% were 65 years of age or older. The gender makeup of the city was 49.6% male and 50.4% female.

== Old Soldiers and Sailors Reunion ==
Erie is famous for its annual Old Soldiers and Sailors Reunion held during the second full week of July, including the annual Free Bean Feed. This reunion has been conducted continuously since 1873 and is claimed to be the oldest consecutively running Old Soldiers and Sailors Reunion in the country.

Salt pork and navy beans were a staple food for soldiers in the Civil War. So it was natural to serve kettles of beans during these reunions. Soon it became a tradition. Now over 1,400 pounds of beans are cooked in more than 50 iron kettles on the Courthouse lawn by the American Legion Post. Other events include the Rodeo held on Tuesday and Wednesday evenings during Reunion Week. The Old Soldiers and Sailors Reunion culminates on Friday night when Mainstreet Memories brings in Country and Western Recording Artists from Nashville each year.

Recipe for the Erie Bean Feed
Ingredients: 1,400 pounds of Great Northern navy beans; 125 pounds of bacon; 50 pounds of onions; Water, as needed; Salt and pepper to taste	Preparation: At 7 am -- Hang 53 cast-iron kettles on cooking racks. Wash and divide beans among kettles. Add water and other ingredients.; At 11 am -- Ignite wood kindling underneath the kettles. Add wood as needed.; At 6 pm -- Serve and enjoy.

== Education ==
Erie, Galesburg, Stark, and rural Parsons in Neosho County are served by Erie–Galesburg USD 101 public school district.

On September 18, 2007, the district passed a $21.9 million bond issue. A new green high school in Erie opened for classes in the Fall 2010 semester. In addition, the old high school was remodeled into a grade school facility and a new gym was added at Galesburg Middle School.

The demolition of the old Erie Grade and Middle School brick building began in May 2013 and lasted into July, with the Amish assisting.

The mascot for Erie High School is the Red Devil. The mascot for Galesburg Middle School is the Timber Wolf.

The Erie City Library is located at 204 S. Butler St.

== Transportation ==
The nearest intercity bus stop is located in Chanute. Service is provided by Jefferson Lines on a route from Minneapolis to Tulsa.

== See also ==
- Great Flood of 1951
