= Motor Bob =

Defunct American motor vehicle manufacturer

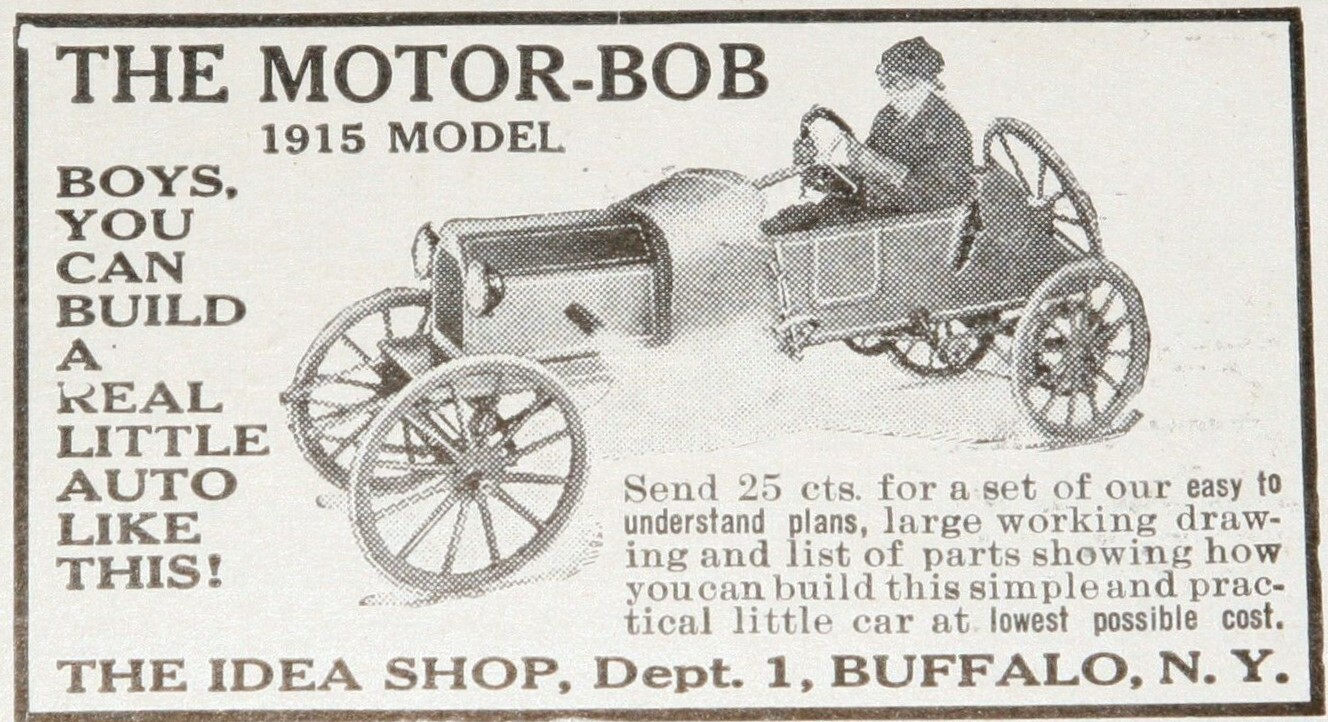
- 1915 Motor Bob Advertisement

Overview
- Type: cyclecar
- Manufacturer: Motor Bob Mfg.
- Production: 1911–1915
- Assembly: Buffalo, New York
- Designer: E. N. Bowen

The Motor Bob was an American cyclecar manufactured in Buffalo, New York, from 1911 to 1915.

== History ==
A single-cylinder, 2½hp vehicle, the Motor Bob was sold for home assembly by "boys from 12 to 15". Plans could be purchased for 25 cents (equivalent to $9 in 2025). From advertisements, by 1912 Motor Bob was also sold as the Niagara Motor Bob by the makers of the Lad's Car. The completed car was 96 inches long 31 inches wide and weighed 150 pounds. Speeds of up to 15 mph were claimed. E. N. Bowen made all the parts of the Motor-Bob himself, and a all parts for the cyclecar could be purchased for $125 (equivalent to $4,018 in 2025) in 1914.

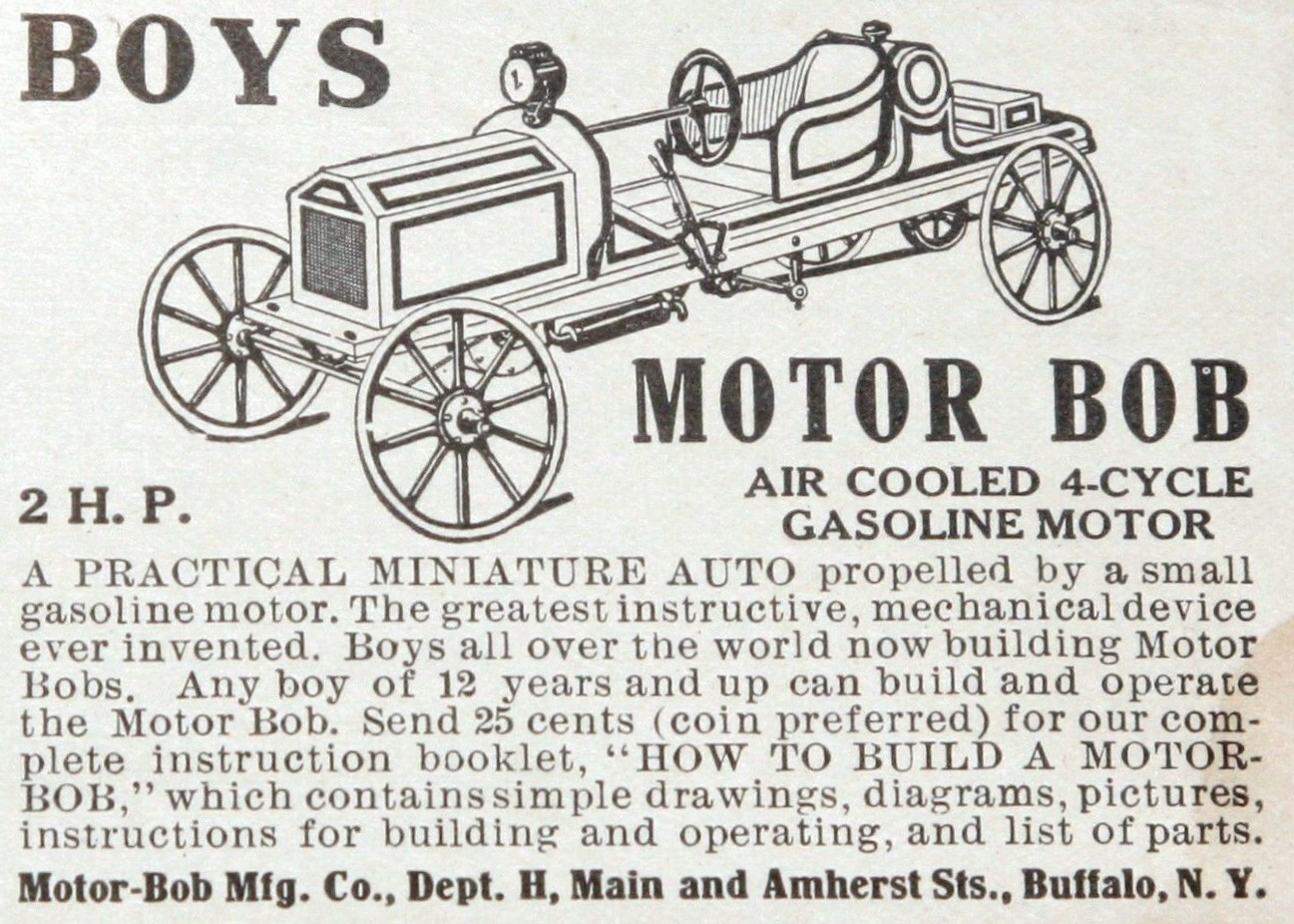
1911 Advertisement for Motor Bob

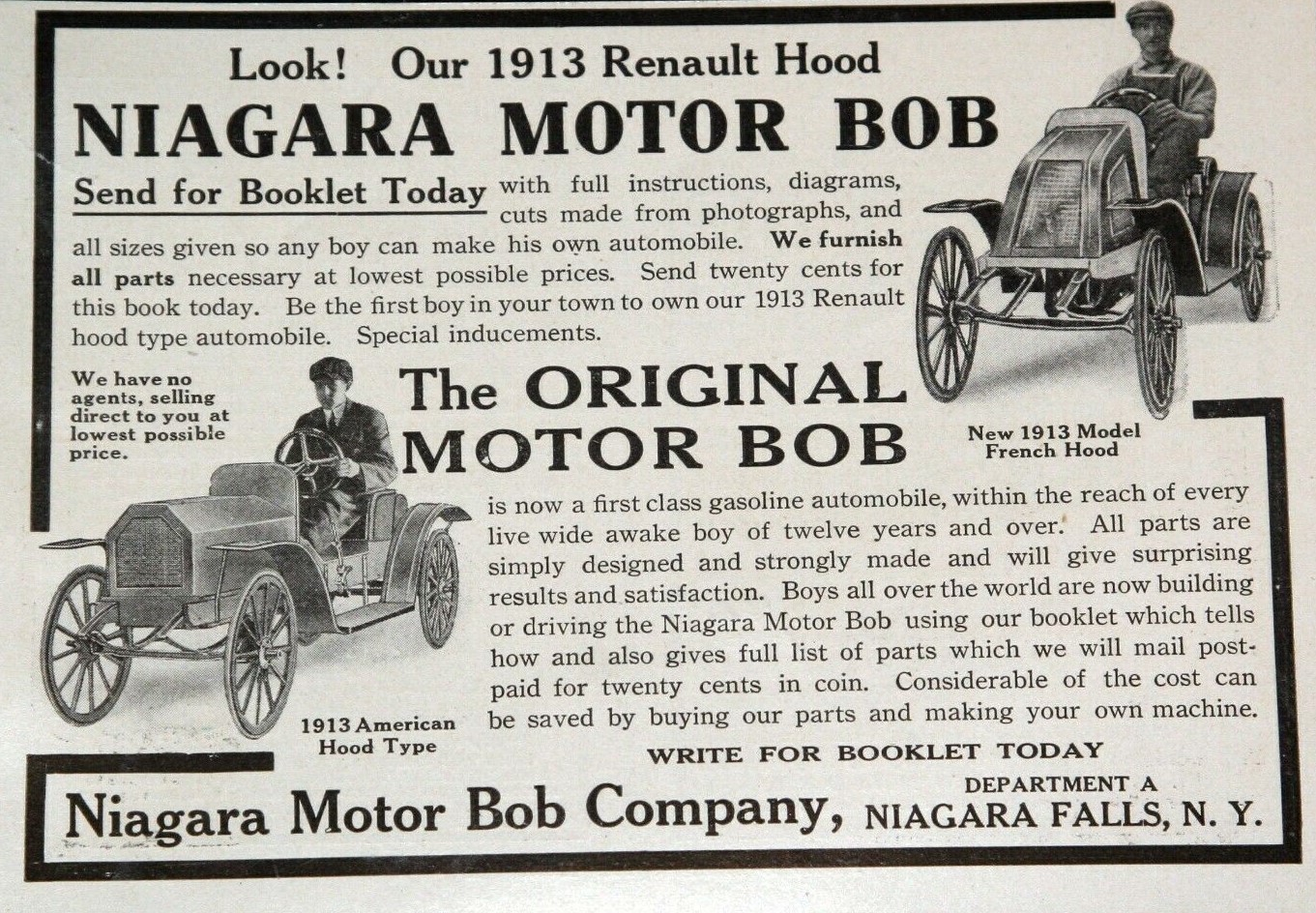
1912 Advertisement for Niagara Motor Bob or the Original Motor Bob
