= Black Crow (automobile) =

Defunct American motor vehicle manufacturer

Crow Motor Car Company
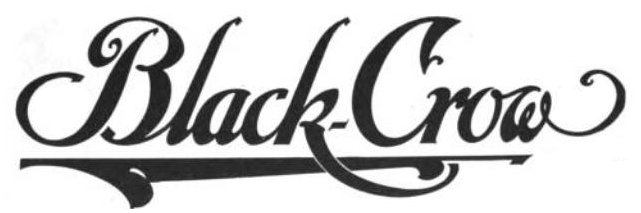

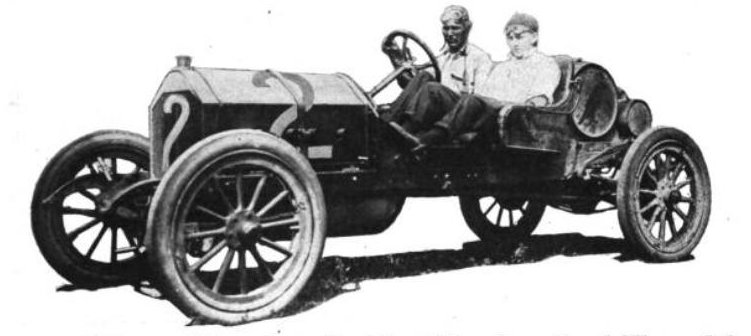
- 1911 Black Crow
- Company type: Automobile Manufacturing
- Industry: Automotive
- Founded: 1909
- Defunct: 1911
- Headquarters: Elkhart, Indiana, United States

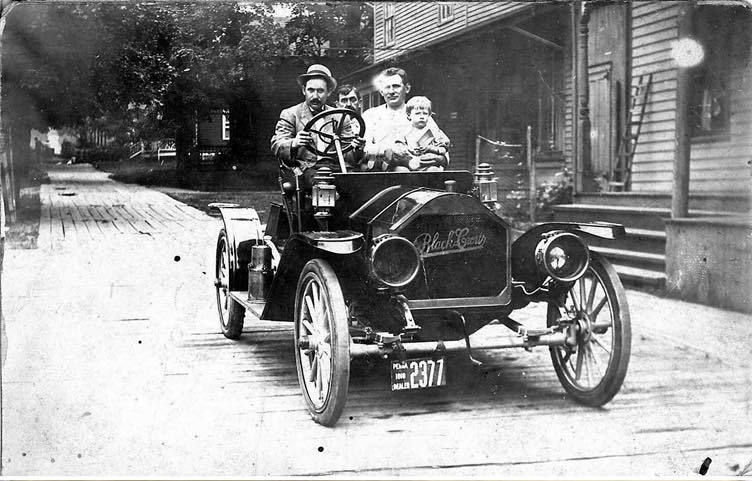
Postcard of right-hand drive Black Crow automobile, ca. 1910 by a Liberty Pennsylvania, photographer. Caption on reverse reads: "Walter Stroble at wheel in Liberty PA ca. 1910"

Black Crow automobiles were manufactured from 1909 until 1911 by the Crow Motor Car Company in Elkhart, Indiana, and sold by the Black Motor Company.

== Sources ==
- Wise, David Burgess. The New Illustrated Encyclopedia of Automobiles. ISBN 0-7858-1106-0
