= Urbana, Kansas =

Unincorporated community in Neosho County, Kansas

- CDP
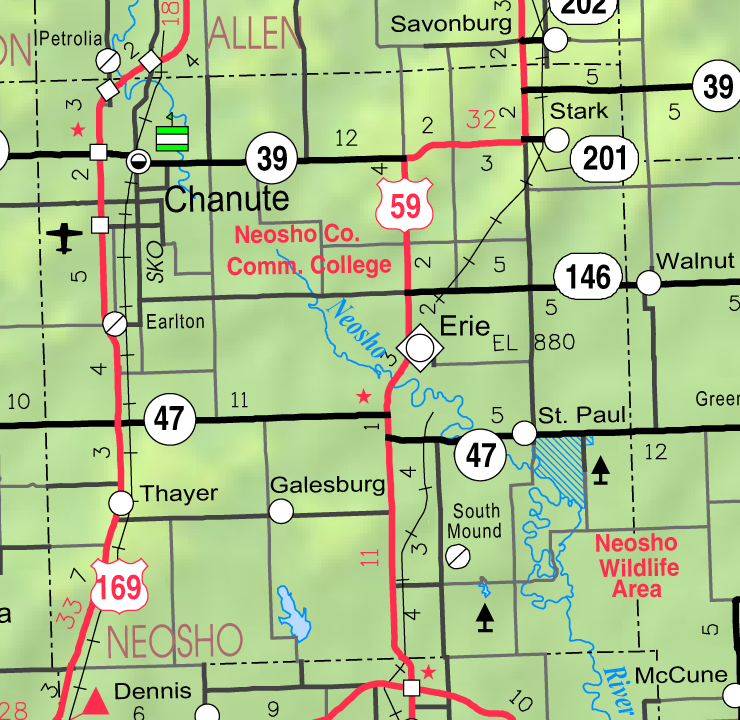
- KDOT map of Neosho County (legend)

- Location within Kansas Location within the United States
- Coordinates: 37°33′29″N 95°23′58″W
- Country: United States
- State: Kansas
- County: Neosho
- Elevation: 955 ft (291 m)

Population (2020)
  - Total: 30
- Time zone: UTC-6 (CST)
  - Summer (DST): UTC-5 (CDT)
- Area code: 620
- FIPS code: 20-72600
- GNIS ID: 475106

Urbana is a census-designated place (CDP) in Neosho County, Kansas, United States. As of the 2020 census, the population was 30.

== History ==
Urbana was platted in 1870. It was located on the Missouri Pacific Railroad.

A post office was opened in Urbana in 1870, and remained in operation until it was discontinued in 1957.

From 1877 to 1878 it was the site of the short-lived "Esperanza Community", which was described as "a colony of communists." They bought a hotel and ran a newspaper called The Star of Hope.

== Demographics ==
Historical population
Census	Pop.	Note	%±
2020	30		—
U.S. Decennial Census

== Transportation ==
The nearest intercity bus stop is located in Chanute. Service is provided by Jefferson Lines on a route from Minneapolis to Tulsa.
