= Black Motor Company =

Defunct American motor vehicle manufacturer

Black
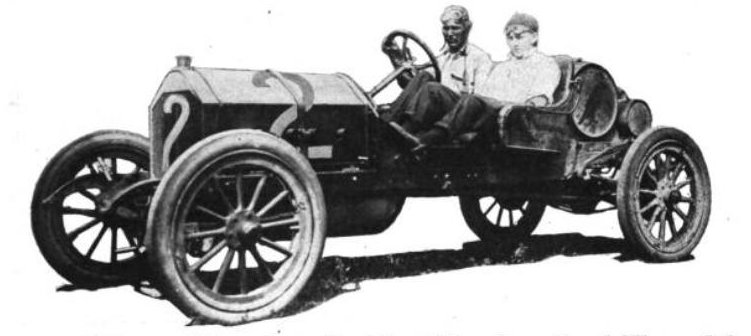

Overview
- Manufacturer: Black Motor Company
- Production: 1906–1911

Body and chassis
- Body style: roadster, surrey

Powertrain
- Engine: two-cylinder air-cooled gasoline

The Black was an American brass era automobile, built at 124 East Ohio Street, Chicago, Illinois, in 1906.

It was a high wheeler buggy priced at a US$375-$450, when Gale's Model A was $500, the high-volume Oldsmobile Runabout went for $650, and the Ford "Doctor's Car" was $850.

The Black featured a 10 hp (7.5 kW) two-cylinder air-cooled gasoline engine, chain drive, wheel steering and (unusual for the era) double brakes. It bragged speeds of 2-25 mph (3.2–40 km/h) and mileage of 30mpg (12.75 L/100 km).

Surreys and "top motor buggies" were also advertised.

== Black Crow and Chicago Motor Buggy ==
From 1909 to 1911, Black sold a rebadged Crow-Elkhart automobile as the "Black Crow". In addition to Black and Black Crow names, during 1908 and 1909, the company also sold a two-cylinder, high-wheeler under the Chicago Motor Buggy name.

== Sources ==
- Clymer, Floyd. Treasury of Early American Automobiles, 1877–1925 (New York: Bonanza Books, 1950), p. 32.
- Kimes, Beverly. Standard Catalog of American Cars 1805-1942. Iola, WI: Krause Publications, 1996.
- Wise, David Burgess. The New Illustrated Encyclopedia of Automobiles. ISBN 0-7858-1106-0
