= Odense, Kansas =

Unincorporated community in Neosho County, Kansas

Odense is an unincorporated community in Neosho County, Kansas, United States. Odense is located at 37°42′11″N 95°15′07″W.

== History ==
Odense had a post office from the 1870s until 1902. The community was named after Odense, in Denmark.

== Transportation ==
The nearest intercity bus stop is located in Chanute. Service is provided by Jefferson Lines on a route from Minneapolis to Tulsa.
