= King Midget =

King Midget (Model III)
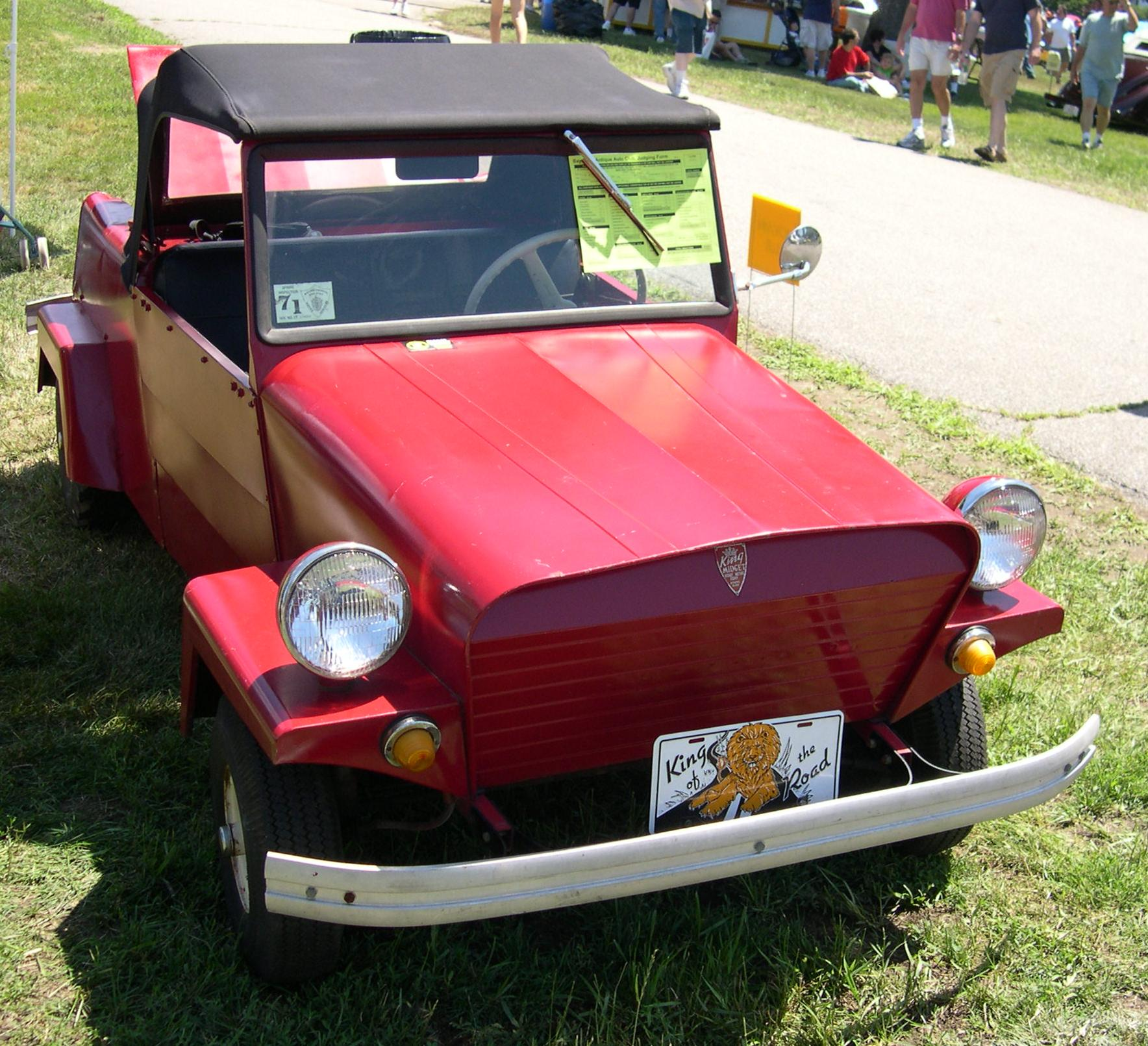

Overview
- Manufacturer: Midget Motors Corporation
- Production: 1946–1970

Body and chassis
- Class: microcar
- Body style: 2-door convertible

Powertrain
- Engine: 1-cylinder air-cooled
- Transmission: 2-speed automatic

The King Midget was a micro car produced between 1946 and 1970 by the Midget Motors Corporation. The King Midget company started out by offering a kit to build a car, but soon added completely assembled cars and later only offered completed cars.

== History ==
Company founders Claud Dry and Dale Orcutt, airplane pilots turned car designers, first sold the King Midget as part of their Midget Motors Supply operations in Athens, Ohio. Dry and Orcutt were inspired by their experience flying the Civil Air Patrol to create a car based on aircraft construction principles. By 1948, they began to use the name Midget Motors Manufacturing Co. In about 1956, Dry and Orcutt changed the name of their company to Midget Motors Corporation.

Midget Motors' primary methods of advertising their cars were through small advertisements in popular magazines that appealed to home mechanics. The ads were tiny but effective; they showed a midget car and some earlier ads contained the phrase "500 lb. car for $500.00". The ads brought in a steady stream of interested customers. Some of the magazines featured articles about the car and several pictured the car on their front cover. This method of direct selling continued for most of the life of the company.

Although the founders had maintained their independence, by the 1960s they were approaching retirement age. In 1966 they accepted a buy-out offer from a group led by Joseph Stehlin, backed by investment bankers and the owners retired, remaining as consultants. Over the years they had remained profitable by carefully matching their production to sales. They had produced a unique car of their own design and constantly introduced improvements and refined their design. The new owners had a different vision; they vastly increased production but the anticipated increased sales did not follow. By 1969 the company was forced into bankruptcy. Production manager Vernon Eads bought the remains of Midget Motors under the name Barthman Corporation. He moved the base of operations to Glouster, Ohio, just north of Athens where he could rent space cheaply. He opened a plant in Florida, but after a fire there the company closed in 1970.

As of 2026, the rights to the King Midget trademark are held by The International King Midget Car Club, Inc: https://tsdr.uspto.gov/#caseNumber=99432738&caseSearchType=US_APPLICATION&caseType=DEFAULT&searchType=statusSearch

== Vehicles ==
The first generation King Midget was a single-passenger kit designed to resemble a midget racer. The kit included the chassis, axles, steering assembly, springs, instruction manual, plus dimensioned patterns for the sheet metal, all for a cost of $270.00. It would accept any one-cylinder engine. By 1947, the Model 1 was also available in assembled form, powered by a 6 hp (4.5 kW) Wisconsin engine. Since adding a differential would have increased the cost, the car was driven by the right rear wheel only. It used a centrifugal clutch designed by Orcutt. The pair began to develop a two-passenger micro car in 1947. In total, nine separate prototypes were built until the designers met their goals of simplicity, lightness, and economy. The result was the Model 2.

When it appeared on the cover of Popular Science magazine in 1951, the Model 2 was a two-passenger convertible offered either fully assembled or as a kit, powered by a 23 cu in (0.4 L) 7.5 hp (5.6 kW) sidevalve Wisconsin AENL engine. With a 72 in (1,800 mm) wheelbase (8 in (200 mm) less than a Crosley 4CC), it measured only 102 in (260 cm) overall. The Model 2 was still a very basic car; it had no speedometer or reverse, but it was light, strong, and available for just $500. In 1955, a custom model of the Model 2 was introduced. It lasted through 1957, with the price remaining under $550. By contrast, a four-passenger 1952 Crosley CD sedan could be had, fully assembled, for $943, and a wagon as low as $1002. Soon after the Model 2 was in production, the company began to offer the option of a two-speed automatic transmission that included a reverse. This transmission, developed and patented by Orcutt and Dry, was soon to be included as standard equipment and was used on all subsequent models.

In the 1950s, Midget Motors developed the Junior and Trainer. Both designs were tube-framed motorized four-wheelers that were forerunners of the go-karts and all-terrain vehicles that were to become popular later. The Junior was powered by a 2.5 hp (1.9 kW) Briggs & Stratton engine, while the Trainer used a 3 hp (2.2 kW) Briggs and Stratton. Both had an automatic clutch with a geared, reverse transmission in the drive train. They were discontinued in the early 1960s.

In 1957, the Model 3 was introduced. On a new, 76.5 in (1,940 mm) wheelbase, and now measuring 117 in (300 cm) overall, it was still smaller than a Crosley. It now had four-wheel hydraulic brakes and was powered by a 9.2 hp (6.9 kW) Wisconsin single cylinder engine. The unit-body, which was welded for increased strength, was continued throughout to the end of production. The 1958 price approached $900. (The much bigger Rambler American started at $1775.) In 1966 more power was added when the company switched to a 12 hp (8.9 kW) Kohler engine, and also converted the car to a 12-volt electrical system. Midget production lasted through the 1960s, and eventually almost 5,000 were built.

After Vernon Eads bought the remains of Midget Motors, he created plans for a new model, the Commuter, a one-piece fiberglass car that resembled a dune buggy. A fire at his newly built Florida plant destroyed the only body mold. The 1970 run was 15 cars, including the only three Commuters ever built. The costs of rebuilding after the fire, combined with new safety and emissions standards, were more than Eads could bear, and he closed the company in 1970.

== The King Midget Car Club ==
Today, more information about the King Midget is made available by members of the King Midget Car Club, which offers books on the history of the cars, an annual gathering of fans and owners, and information about spare parts, repairs, vendors, and restoration. In recent years, an increased appreciation has developed about the qualities of the King Midget's efficient use of materials, fuel economy, ruggedness, and ease of repair.
