= Crow-Elkhart (automobile company) =

Defunct American motor vehicle manufacturer

Crow-Elkhart Motor Company
- Type: Automobile Manufacturing
- Industry: Automotive
- Founded: 1909
- Defunct: 1924
- Headquarters: Elkhart, Indiana

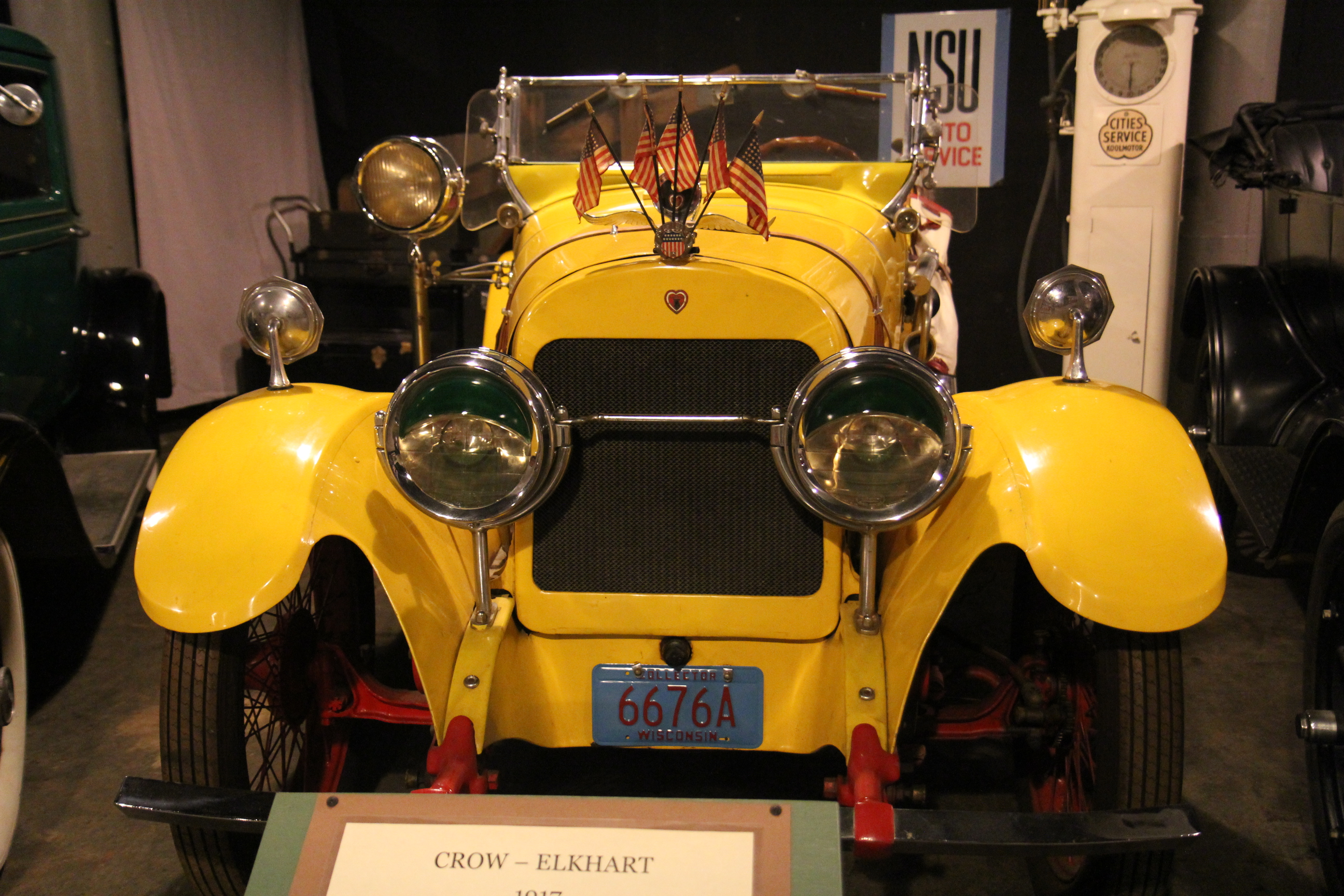
1917 Crow Elkhart 35

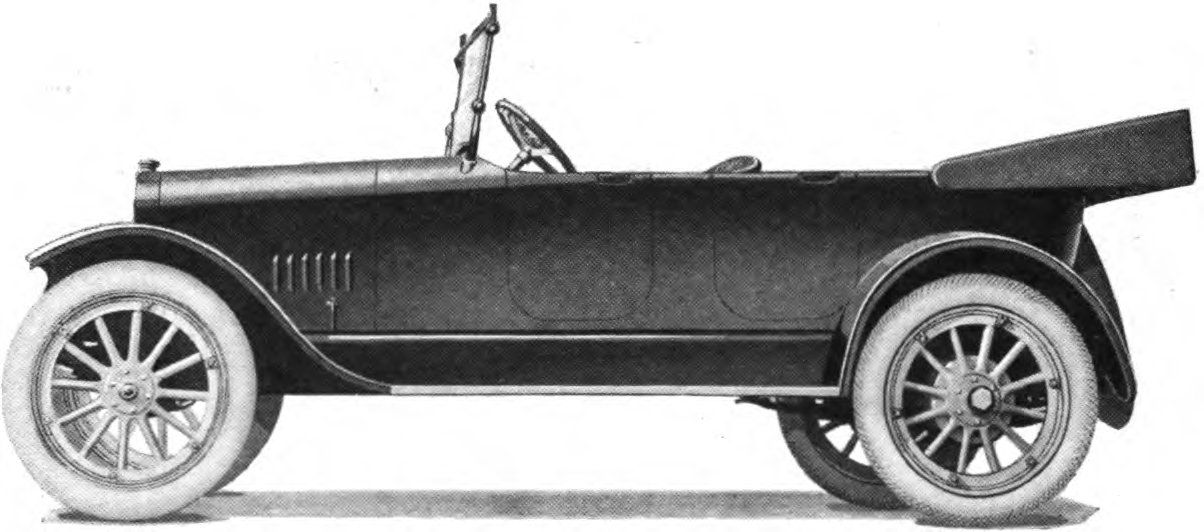
Crow-Elkhart C-E 36 Touring

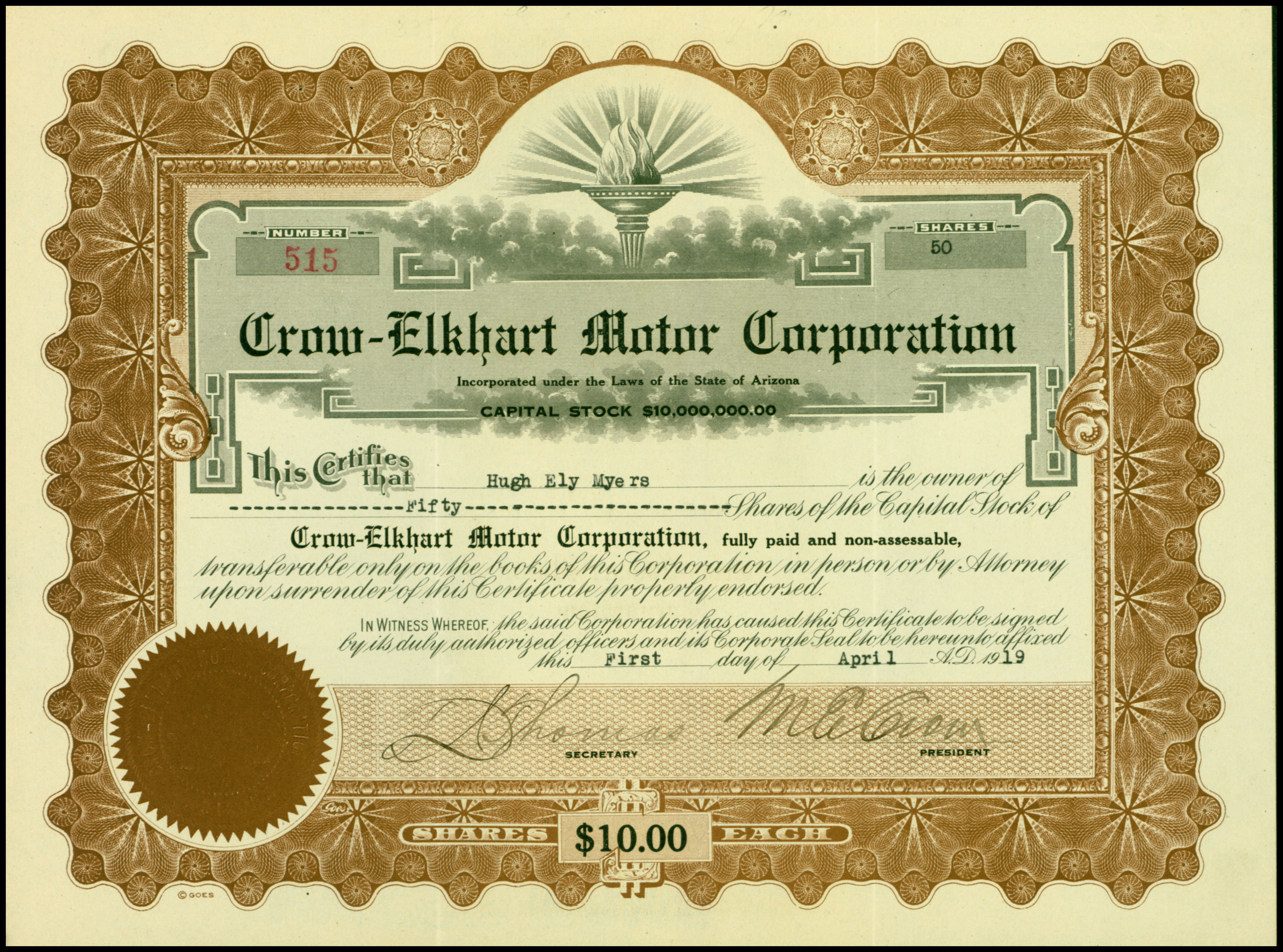
Share of the Crow-Elkhart Motor Corporation, issued 1. April 1919

The Crow-Elkhart was an American automobile manufactured from 1909 until 1924 by the Crow-Elkhart Motor Company of Elkhart, Indiana, founded by Martin E. Crow. The company manufactured both four and six cylinder models. After World War I, Crow-Elkhart used Gray victory engines in some of its cars.

In 1922, the company went into receivership, and on June 22, 1923, the company's assets were sold for $78,000.

== Models ==
Year	Engine	HP	Wheelbase
1911	4-cylinder	25, 29, 32, 35, 38, 40	109–120 in (2,769–3,048 mm)
Four(1912)	4-cylinder	20	110 in (2,794 mm)
1912	4-cylinder	26,27,28	114–18 in (2,896–457 mm)
1913	4-cylinder or 6-Cylinder	33-60	114–137 in (2,896–3,480 mm)
Four(1914–1915)	4-cylinder	26	114 in (2,896 mm)
Four(1914–1915)	4-cylinder	29	120 in (3,048 mm)
Six(1914–1915)	6-cylinder	34	130 in (3,302 mm)
Model 30(1916)	4-cylinder	20	112 in (2,845 mm)
Four(1917)	4-cylinder	20	114 in (2,896 mm)
Model C-E-36(1918–1919)	4-cylinder	20	115 in (2,921 mm)
Model L(1920–1923)	4-cylinder	34.9	117 in (2,972 mm)
Model H(1920)	6-cylinder	57	117 in (2,972 mm)
Model S(1921–1923)	6-cylinder	57	117 in (2,972 mm)
Model C-65(1922–1923)	4-cylinder	N/A	N/A
Model CS-65(1922–1963)	6-cylinder	N/A	N/A

== Black Crow ==
From 1909 to 1911, the Black Motor Company of Chicago, Illinois, sold a rebadged Crow-Elkhart automobile as the "Black Crow".

== Advertisements ==
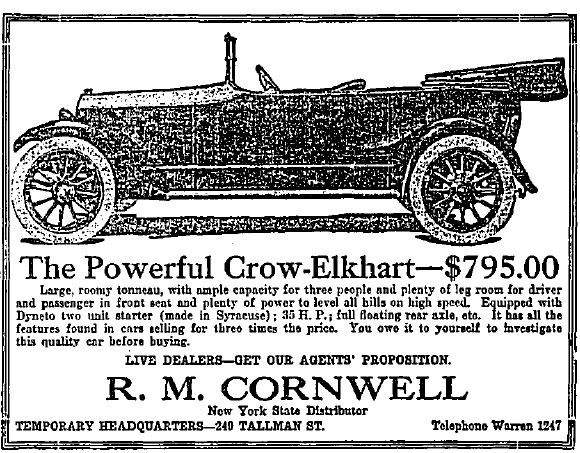
A 1917 Crow-Elkhart Advertisement - Syracuse Post-Standard, February 11, 1917
