= Buffalo Transportation Pierce-Arrow Museum =

Automobile museum in Buffalo, New York

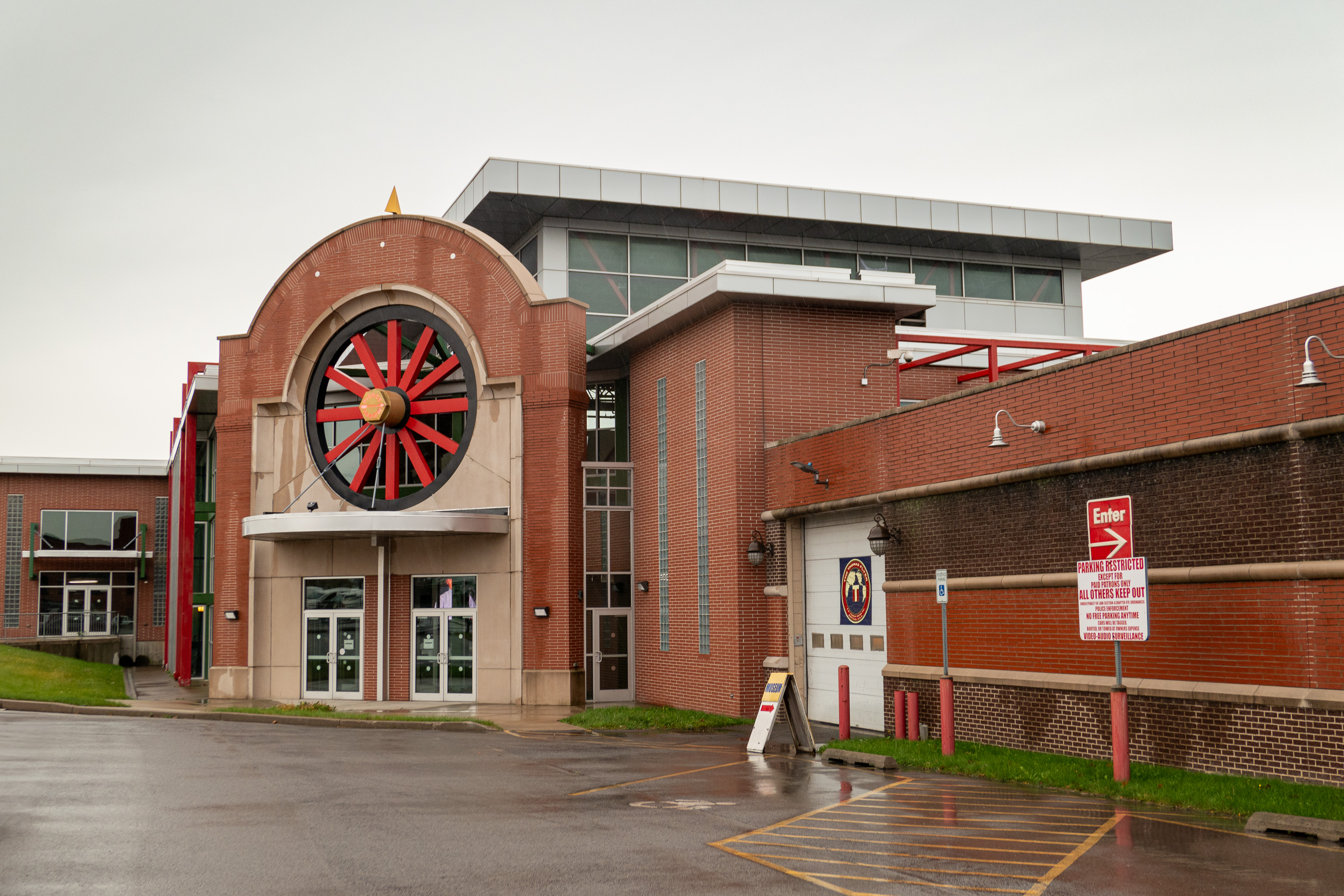
- Exterior of the Buffalo Transportation Pierce-Arrow Museum

- Location within New York
- Location: Buffalo, New York
- Coordinates: 42.8789°N 78.868962°W
- Type: Automobile museum
- Website: www.pierce-arrow.com

The Buffalo Transportation Pierce-Arrow Museum is an automobile museum in Buffalo, New York.

The museum documents the automotive history of Western New York, with a focus on Buffalo-made automobiles such as those made by the Pierce-Arrow Motor Car Company and Thomas Motor Company. The museum's collections include automobiles, automotive memorabilia, and archival materials.

Other museum highlights include the Thomas Flyer that won the 1908 New York to Paris Race and the Frank Lloyd Wright Filling Station, designed for a Buffalo company in the 1920s but not built at the time The museum's collection also includes 60 bicycles, ten of which were built by the Buffalo-based George N. Pierce Company. Other highlights include the Thomas Rocket Car and a prototype single-seater car built by the Playboy Motor Car Company.
