= Neosho County, Kansas =

County in Kansas, United States

- County
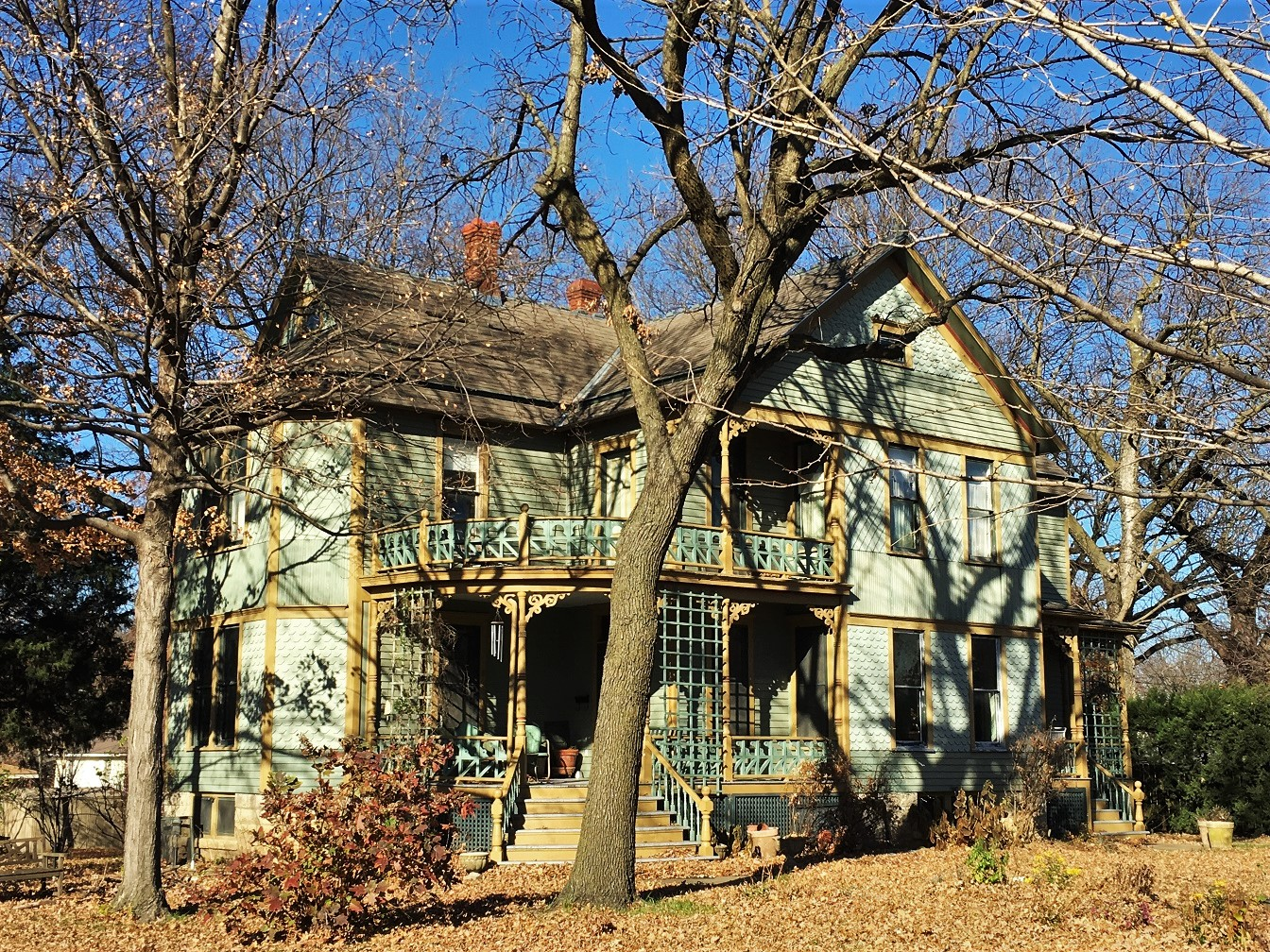
- James and Ella Truitt House in Chanute (2017)

- Location within the U.S. state of Kansas
- Coordinates: 37°40′57″N 95°17′51″W
- Country: United States
- State: Kansas
- Founded: June 3, 1861
- Named for: Neosho River
- Seat: Erie
- Largest city: Chanute

Area
  - Total: 578 sq mi (1,500 km^{2})
  - Land: 571 sq mi (1,480 km^{2})
  - Water: 6.3 sq mi (16 km^{2}) 1.1%

Population (2020)
  - Total: 15,904
  - Estimate (2025): 15,637 ▼
  - Density: 27.1/sq mi (10.5/km^{2})
- Time zone: UTC−6 (Central)
  - Summer (DST): UTC−5 (CDT)
- Congressional district: 2nd
- Website: NeoshoCountyKS.org

Neosho County is a county located in Southeast Kansas. Its county seat is Erie. As of the 2020 census, the county population was 15,904. The county was named for the Neosho River, which passes through the county.

== History ==
=== Early history ===
For many millennia, the Great Plains of North America was inhabited by nomadic Native Americans. From the 16th century to 18th century, the Kingdom of France claimed ownership of large parts of North America. In 1762, after the French and Indian War, France secretly ceded New France to Spain, per the Treaty of Fontainebleau.

=== 19th century ===
In 1802, Spain returned most of the land to France, but keeping title to about 7,500 square miles. In 1803, most of the land for modern day Kansas was acquired by the United States from France as part of the 828,000 square mile Louisiana Purchase for 2.83 cents per acre.

In 1854, the Kansas Territory was organized, then in 1861 Kansas became the 34th U.S. state. In 1861, Neosho County was established.

The first railroad was built through Neosho County in 1870.

== Geography ==
According to the U.S. Census Bureau, the county has a total area of 578 square miles (1,500 km^{2}), of which 571 square miles (1,480 km^{2}) is land and 6.3 square miles (16 km^{2}) (1.1%) is water.

=== Adjacent counties ===
- Allen County (north)
- Bourbon County (northeast)
- Crawford County (east)
- Labette County (south)
- Montgomery County (southwest)
- Wilson County (west)
- Woodson County (northwest)

== Demographics ==
Historical population
Census	Pop.	Note	%±
1860	88		—
1870	10,206		11,497.7%
1880	15,121		48.2%
1890	18,561		22.7%
1900	19,254		3.7%
1910	23,754		23.4%
1920	24,000		1.0%
1930	22,665		−5.6%
1940	22,210		−2.0%
1950	20,348		−8.4%
1960	19,455		−4.4%
1970	18,812		−3.3%
1980	18,967		0.8%
1990	17,035		−10.2%
2000	16,997		−0.2%
2010	16,512		−2.9%
2020	15,904		−3.7%
2025 (est.)	15,637	▼	−1.7%
U.S. Decennial Census; 1790-1960 1900-1990; 1990-2000 2010-2020

=== 2020 census ===
As of the 2020 census, the county had a population of 15,904. The median age was 40.3 years. 24.7% of residents were under the age of 18 and 19.7% of residents were 65 years of age or older. For every 100 females there were 99.7 males, and for every 100 females age 18 and over there were 96.9 males age 18 and over.

The racial makeup of the county was 88.7% White, 0.9% Black or African American, 1.0% American Indian and Alaska Native, 0.5% Asian, 0.0% Native Hawaiian and Pacific Islander, 1.6% from some other race, and 7.2% from two or more races. Hispanic or Latino residents of any race comprised 5.7% of the population.

54.8% of residents lived in urban areas, while 45.2% lived in rural areas.

There were 6,300 households in the county, of which 30.7% had children under the age of 18 living with them and 24.1% had a female householder with no spouse or partner present. About 28.6% of all households were made up of individuals and 14.0% had someone living alone who was 65 years of age or older.

There were 7,211 housing units, of which 12.6% were vacant. Among occupied housing units, 71.1% were owner-occupied and 28.9% were renter-occupied. The homeowner vacancy rate was 1.7% and the rental vacancy rate was 12.6%.

=== 2000 census ===
As of the census of 2000, there were 16,997 people, 6,739 households, and 4,683 families residing in the county. The population density was 30 people per square mile (12 people/km^{2}). There were 7,461 housing units at an average density of 13 per square mile (5.0/km^{2}). The racial makeup of the county was 94.90% White, 0.87% Black or African American, 0.98% Native American, 0.32% Asian, 0.02% Pacific Islander, 1.05% from other races, and 1.86% from two or more races. 2.91% of the population were Hispanic or Latino of any race.

There were 6,739 households, out of which 31.50% had children under the age of 18 living with them, 57.40% were married couples living together, 8.50% had a female householder with no husband present, and 30.50% were non-families. 27.10% of all households were made up of individuals, and 13.80% had someone living alone who was 65 years of age or older. The average household size was 2.45 and the average family size was 2.96.

In the county, the population was spread out, with 25.70% under the age of 18, 8.90% from 18 to 24, 25.40% from 25 to 44, 22.50% from 45 to 64, and 17.50% who were 65 years of age or older. The median age was 38 years. For every 100 females there were 93.40 males. For every 100 females age 18 and over, there were 91.10 males.

The median income for a household in the county was $32,167, and the median income for a family was $38,532. Males had a median income of $26,906 versus $19,387 for females. The per capita income for the county was $16,539. About 10.00% of families and 13.00% of the population were below the poverty line, including 17.60% of those under age 18 and 10.60% of those age 65 or over.

== Government ==
=== Presidential elections ===
Neosho County is a mostly Republican county. Only six presidential elections from 1888 to the present have resulted in Republicans failing to win the county, with the last of these being in 1964. However, like the rest of the four most southeasterly Kansas counties, Democrats have maintained a sizable presence, but not enough to win the county.

Presidential election results

United States presidential election results for Neosho County, Kansas
Year	Republican		Democratic		Third party(ies)	
Year	No.	%	No.	%	No.	%
1888	2,134	49.66%	1,144	26.62%	1,019	23.71%
1892	2,000	47.81%	0	0.00%	2,183	52.19%
1896	2,177	45.20%	2,601	54.01%	38	0.79%
1900	2,424	50.94%	2,279	47.89%	56	1.18%
1904	3,134	62.11%	1,530	30.32%	382	7.57%
1908	2,929	53.15%	2,386	43.30%	196	3.56%
1912	1,580	30.18%	1,993	38.07%	1,662	31.75%
1916	4,053	43.87%	4,891	52.94%	295	3.19%
1920	5,150	60.82%	3,195	37.73%	122	1.44%
1924	5,106	58.70%	2,274	26.14%	1,319	15.16%
1928	6,603	72.27%	2,459	26.92%	74	0.81%
1932	4,212	42.27%	5,616	56.36%	137	1.37%
1936	5,777	50.55%	5,611	49.09%	41	0.36%
1940	6,556	59.43%	4,419	40.06%	56	0.51%
1944	5,420	62.45%	3,233	37.25%	26	0.30%
1948	5,072	56.69%	3,770	42.14%	105	1.17%
1952	6,595	68.60%	2,987	31.07%	32	0.33%
1956	5,886	65.99%	3,005	33.69%	29	0.33%
1960	5,877	62.71%	3,451	36.83%	43	0.46%
1964	3,458	41.68%	4,795	57.80%	43	0.52%
1968	3,950	52.92%	2,725	36.51%	789	10.57%
1972	5,034	65.06%	2,559	33.07%	145	1.87%
1976	4,038	50.32%	3,842	47.88%	144	1.79%
1980	4,613	57.11%	2,923	36.19%	541	6.70%
1984	4,968	64.11%	2,679	34.57%	102	1.32%
1988	3,739	51.77%	3,402	47.11%	81	1.12%
1992	2,926	37.07%	2,799	35.46%	2,168	27.47%
1996	3,409	49.43%	2,527	36.64%	961	13.93%
2000	4,014	58.29%	2,588	37.58%	284	4.12%
2004	4,705	65.07%	2,424	33.52%	102	1.41%
2008	4,473	62.19%	2,563	35.64%	156	2.17%
2012	4,272	65.93%	2,050	31.64%	158	2.44%
2016	4,431	70.18%	1,501	23.77%	382	6.05%
2020	4,970	72.27%	1,796	26.12%	111	1.61%
2024	4,961	73.13%	1,696	25.00%	127	1.87%

=== Laws ===
Following amendment to the Kansas Constitution in 1986, the county remained a prohibition, or "dry", county until 1998, when voters approved the sale of alcoholic liquor by the individual drink with a 30 percent food sales requirement.

=== Local Government ===
Former Neosho County Attorney Linus Thuston, who was jailed for misdemeanor convictions early in 2024, in December 2024 faced six felony charges of perjury and witness intimidation. The complaint accused Thurston of lying during testimony in an arrangement that involved a female (one of more than 50) who were coerced to send Thurston nude photos.Sheriff’s officers filed reports that accused Thuston of using confidential information for personal gain, intimidating a witness or victim, disseminating a criminal history record, theft by deception, preventing reporting of victimization, and other felonies. Those crimes were reported between 2018 and 2023.

== Education ==
=== Unified school districts ===
- Erie-Galesburg USD 101, serves the communities of Erie, Galesburg, Stark.
- Southeast USD 247, serves primarily portions of Crawford and Cherokee counties, but also includes small portions of Labette and Neosho counties.
- Chanute USD 413
- Chetopa–St. Paul USD 505
- Cherryvale-Thayer USD 447

== Communities ==
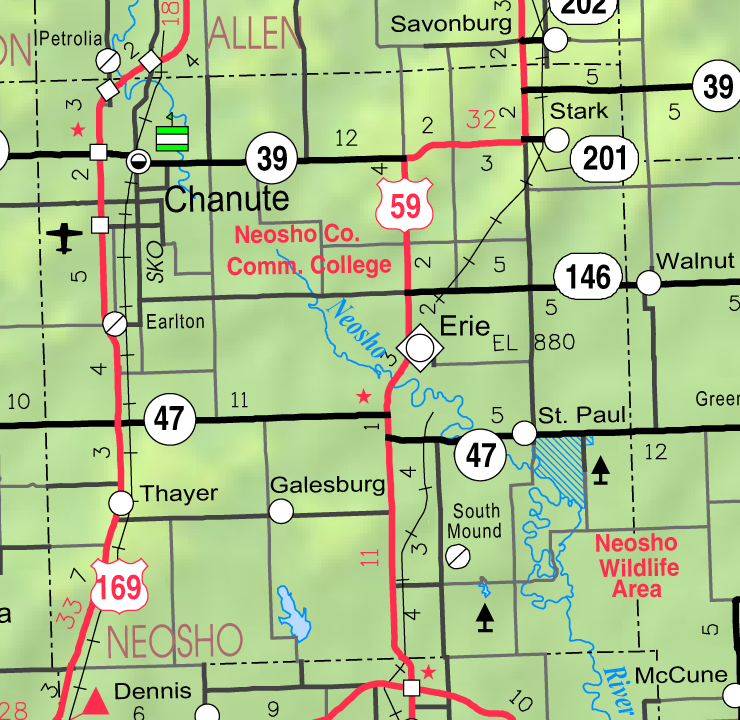
2005 map of Neosho County (map legend)

List of townships / incorporated cities / unincorporated communities / extinct former communities within Neosho County.

=== Cities ===
- Chanute
- Earlton
- Erie (county seat)
- Galesburg
- St. Paul
- Stark
- Thayer

=== Unincorporated communities ===
‡ means a community has portions in an adjacent county. † means a community is designated a Census-Designated Place (CDP) by the United States Census Bureau.

- Kimball
- Leanna‡
- Morehead
- Odense
- Shaw
- South Mound†
- Urbana†

=== Ghost towns ===
- Ladore

=== Townships ===
Neosho County is divided into twelve townships. The city of Chanute is considered governmentally independent and is excluded from the census figures for the townships. In the following table, the population center is the largest city (or cities) included in that township's population total, if it is of a significant size.

Sources: 2000 U.S. Gazetteer from the U.S. Census Bureau.
Township	FIPS	Population center	Population	Population density /km^{2} (/sq mi)	Land area km^{2} (sq mi)	Water area km^{2} (sq mi)	Water %	Geographic coordinates
Big Creek	06675		456	4 (10)	124 (48)	1 (0)	0.47%	37°41′N 95°18′W
Canville	10525		571	5 (12)	124 (48)	0 (0)	0.34%	37°36′N 95°27′W
Centerville	12375		564	5 (12)	123 (48)	1 (0)	0.93%	37°31′N 95°18′W
Chetopa	12975		894	7 (19)	124 (48)	0 (0)	0.40%	37°31′N 95°28′W
Erie	21525		1,524	12 (32)	123 (47)	1 (1)	1.17%	37°35′N 95°16′W
Grant	27800		384	3 (8)	125 (48)	0 (0)	0.19%	37°41′N 95°10′W
Ladore	37600		401	3 (9)	121 (47)	3 (1)	2.69%	37°26′N 95°18′W
Lincoln	40875		345	3 (7)	123 (47)	2 (1)	1.29%	37°26′N 95°9′W
Mission	47250		927	8 (20)	119 (46)	5 (2)	3.97%	37°31′N 95°10′W
Shiloh	65300		297	2 (6)	125 (48)	0 (0)	0.25%	37°26′N 95°28′W
Tioga	70650		885	8 (21)	109 (42)	1 (1)	1.21%	37°42′N 95°27′W
Walnut Grove	75175		338	3 (7)	125 (48)	0 (0)	0.11%	37°36′N 95°10′W

== See also ==
National Register of Historic Places listings in Neosho County, Kansas

Community information for Kansas

- Kansas locations by per capita income
- List of counties in Kansas
- List of townships in Kansas
- List of cities in Kansas
- List of unincorporated communities in Kansas
- List of ghost towns in Kansas
