= Stark, Kansas =

City in Neosho County, Kansas

- City
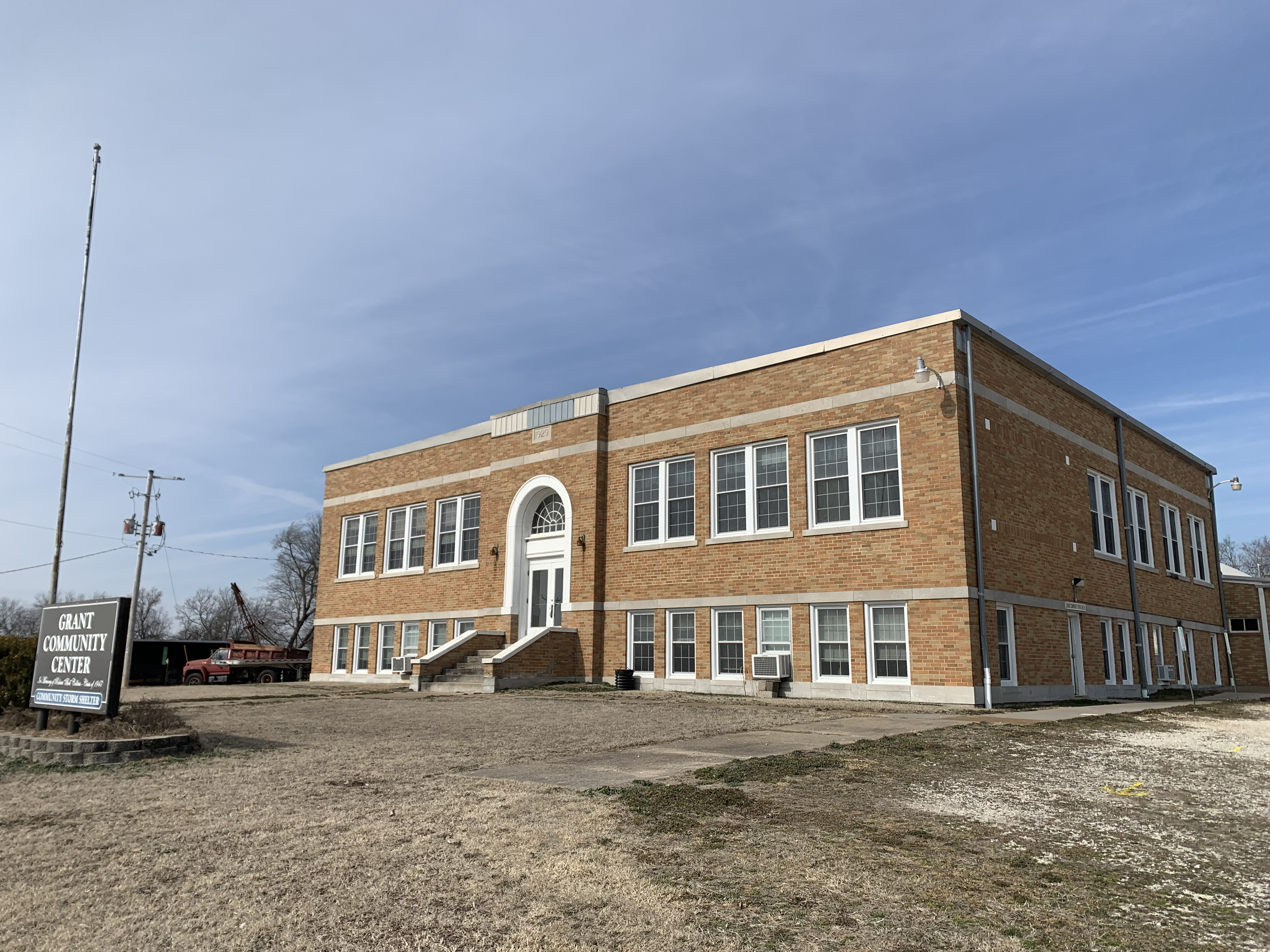
- Grant Community Center in Stark (2026)

- Location within Neosho County and Kansas

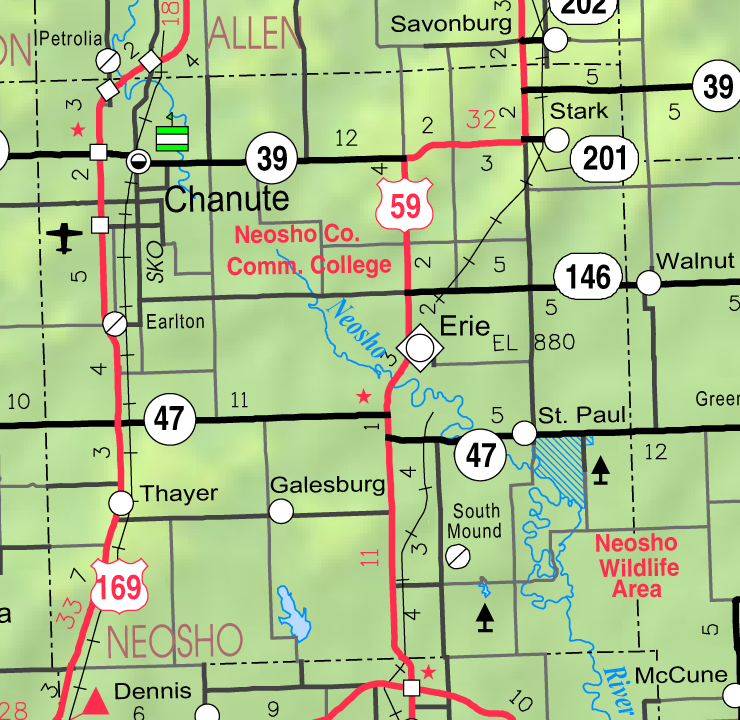
- KDOT map of Neosho County (legend)
- Coordinates: 37°41′23″N 95°8′37″W
- Country: United States
- State: Kansas
- County: Neosho
- Founded: 1888
- Platted: 1888
- Incorporated: 1910
- Named for: Stark County, Illinois

Area
  - Total: 0.17 sq mi (0.43 km^{2})
  - Land: 0.17 sq mi (0.43 km^{2})
  - Water: 0 sq mi (0.00 km^{2})
- Elevation: 1,063 ft (324 m)

Population (2020)
  - Total: 69
  - Density: 420/sq mi (160/km^{2})
- Time zone: UTC-6 (CST)
  - Summer (DST): UTC-5 (CDT)
- ZIP Code: 66775
- Area code: 620
- FIPS code: 20-68025
- GNIS ID: 2395957

Stark is a city in Neosho County, Kansas, United States. As of the 2020 census, the population of the city was 69.

== History ==
The first post office at Stark was established in January 1886.

Stark was laid out and platted in 1888. It was named after Stark County, Illinois. The Kansas City Pacific Railroad built through Stark and maintained passenger and freight depots in the town. The rail line soon became the Kansas City Division of the Missouri-Kansas-Texas Railroad and is still active today as part of the Union Pacific Railroad.

== Geography ==
According to the United States Census Bureau, the city has a total area of 0.17 square miles (0.44 km^{2}), all land.

Stark is located east of U.S. Route 59 on K-201.

== Demographics ==
Historical population
Census	Pop.	Note	%±
1910	191		—
1920	189		−1.0%
1930	197		4.2%
1940	160		−18.8%
1950	157		−1.9%
1960	96		−38.9%
1970	124		29.2%
1980	143		15.3%
1990	79		−44.8%
2000	106		34.2%
2010	72		−32.1%
2020	69		−4.2%
U.S. Decennial Census

=== 2010 census ===
As of the census of 2010, there were 72 people, 39 households, and 25 families residing in the city. The population density was 423.5 inhabitants per square mile (163.5/km^{2}). There were 48 housing units at an average density of 282.4 per square mile (109.0/km^{2}). The racial makeup of the city was 100.0% White.

There were 39 households, of which 10.3% had children under the age of 18 living with them, 48.7% were married couples living together, 7.7% had a female householder with no husband present, 7.7% had a male householder with no wife present, and 35.9% were non-families. 30.8% of all households were made up of individuals, and 7.7% had someone living alone who was 65 years of age or older. The average household size was 1.85 and the average family size was 2.20.

The median age in the city was 54.3 years. 8.3% of residents were under the age of 18; 8.5% were between the ages of 18 and 24; 25% were from 25 to 44; 31.9% were from 45 to 64; and 26.4% were 65 years of age or older. The gender makeup of the city was 54.2% male and 45.8% female.

=== 2000 census ===
As of the census of 2000, there were 106 people, 42 households, and 27 families residing in the city. The population density was 609.0 inhabitants per square mile (235.1/km^{2}). There were 47 housing units at an average density of 270.0 per square mile (104.2/km^{2}). The racial makeup of the city was 99.06% White and 0.94% Native American.

There were 42 households, out of which 28.6% had children under the age of 18 living with them, 45.2% were married couples living together, 11.9% had a female householder with no husband present, and 35.7% were non-families. 33.3% of all households were made up of individuals, and 16.7% had someone living alone who was 65 years of age or older. The average household size was 2.52 and the average family size was 3.30.

In the city, the population was spread out, with 33.0% under the age of 18, 7.5% from 18 to 24, 28.3% from 25 to 44, 19.8% from 45 to 64, and 11.3% who were 65 years of age or older. The median age was 34 years. For every 100 females, there were 112.0 males. For every 100 females age 18 and over, there were 97.2 males.

The median income for a household in the city was $27,500, and the median income for a family was $27,083. Males had a median income of $15,833 versus $15,625 for females. The per capita income for the city was $11,728. There were 16.1% of families and 17.2% of the population living below the poverty line, including 25.9% of under eighteens and none of those over 64.

== Education ==
The community is served by Erie–Galesburg USD 101 public school district.

== Transportation ==
The nearest intercity bus stop is located in Chanute. Service is provided by Jefferson Lines on a route from Minneapolis to Tulsa.
