= Galesburg, Kansas =

City in Neosho County, Kansas

- City
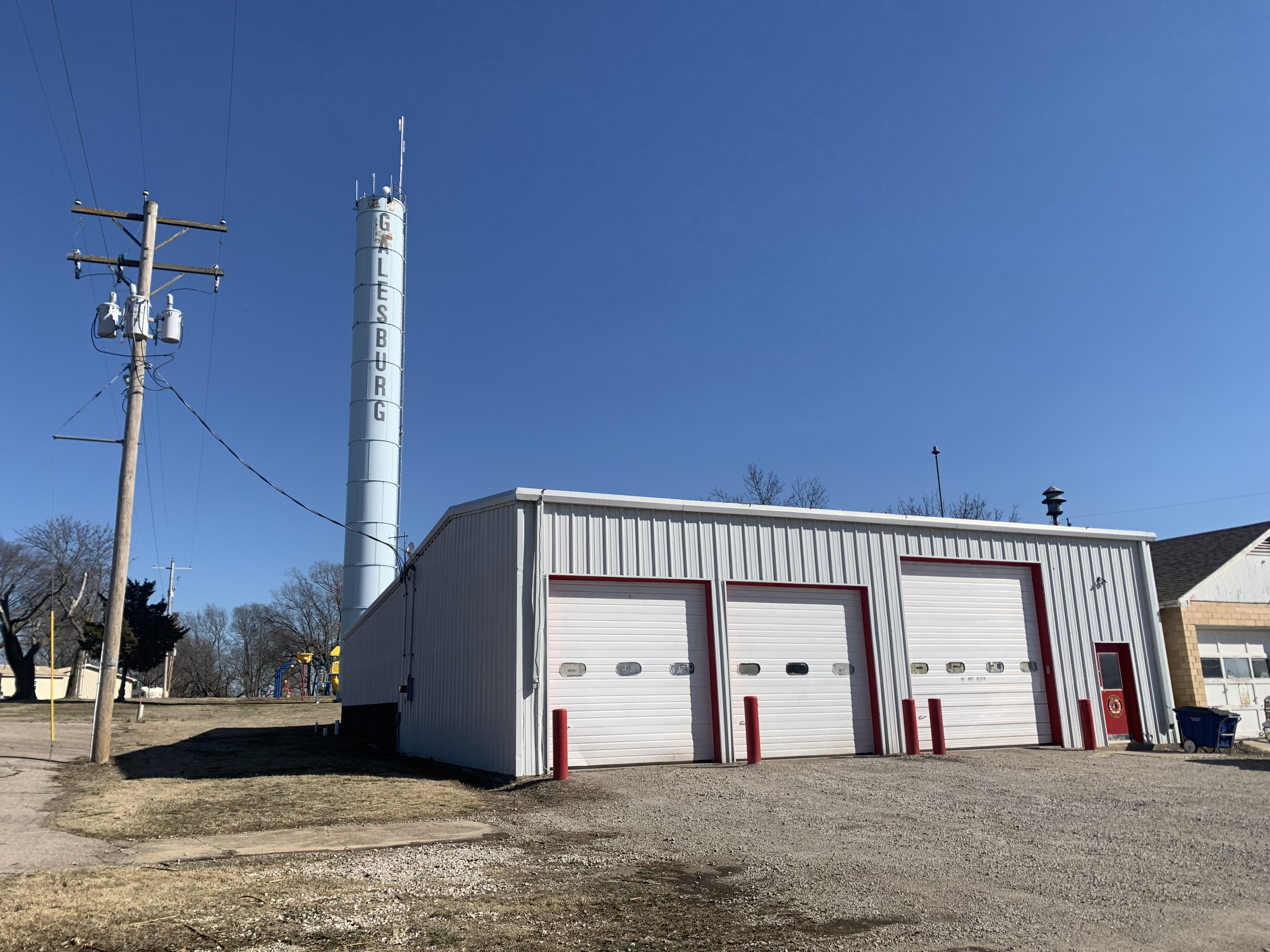
- Galesburg Fire Station (2026)

- Location within Neosho County and Kansas

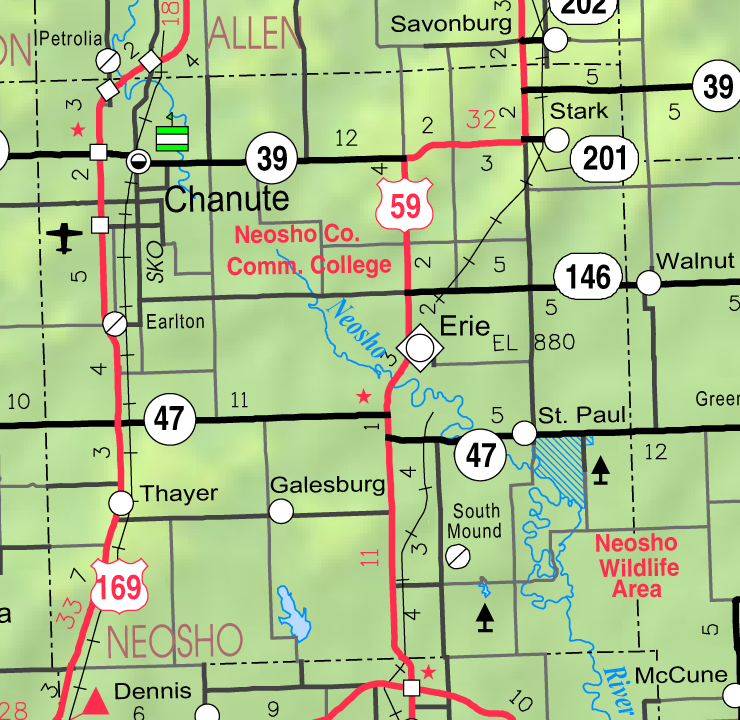
- KDOT map of Neosho County (legend)
- Coordinates: 37°28′20″N 95°21′23″W
- Country: United States
- State: Kansas
- County: Neosho
- Founded: 1871
- Platted: 1871
- Incorporated: 1907

Area
  - Total: 0.17 sq mi (0.45 km^{2})
  - Land: 0.17 sq mi (0.45 km^{2})
  - Water: 0 sq mi (0.00 km^{2})
- Elevation: 984 ft (300 m)

Population (2020)
  - Total: 149
  - Density: 860/sq mi (330/km^{2})
- Time zone: UTC-6 (CST)
  - Summer (DST): UTC-5 (CDT)
- ZIP Code: 66740
- Area code: 620
- FIPS code: 20-25150
- GNIS ID: 2394843
- Website: www.galesburgks.com

Galesburg is a city in Neosho County, Kansas, United States. As of the 2020 census, the population of the city was 149.

== History ==
Galesburg was laid out and platted in 1871 when the railroad was extended to that point. A post office established in Rose Hill (an extinct town) was moved to Galesburg, and opened in March 1871.

== Geography ==
According to the United States Census Bureau, the city has a total area of 0.17 square miles (0.44 km^{2}), all land.

=== Climate ===
The climate in this area is characterized by hot, humid summers and generally mild to cool winters. According to the Köppen Climate Classification system, Galesburg has a humid subtropical climate, abbreviated "Cfa" on climate maps.

== Demographics ==
Historical population
Census	Pop.	Note	%±
1880	63		—
1910	183		—
1920	205		12.0%
1930	199		−2.9%
1940	165		−17.1%
1950	189		14.5%
1960	128		−32.3%
1970	146		14.1%
1980	181		24.0%
1990	160		−11.6%
2000	150		−6.2%
2010	126		−16.0%
2020	149		18.3%
U.S. Decennial Census

=== 2020 census ===
The 2020 United States census counted 149 people, 57 households, and 40 families in Galesburg. The population density was 851.4 per square mile (328.7/km^{2}). There were 62 housing units at an average density of 354.3 per square mile (136.8/km^{2}). The racial makeup was 94.63% (141) white or European American (93.96% non-Hispanic white), 0.0% (0) black or African-American, 0.67% (1) Native American or Alaska Native, 0.0% (0) Asian, 0.0% (0) Pacific Islander or Native Hawaiian, 0.67% (1) from other races, and 4.03% (6) from two or more races. Hispanic or Latino of any race was 4.7% (7) of the population.

Of the 57 households, 33.3% had children under the age of 18; 52.6% were married couples living together; 22.8% had a female householder with no spouse or partner present. 28.1% of households consisted of individuals and 12.3% had someone living alone who was 65 years of age or older. The average household size was 3.8 and the average family size was 4.1. The percent of those with a bachelor's degree or higher was estimated to be 10.1% of the population.

30.2% of the population was under the age of 18, 10.1% from 18 to 24, 16.8% from 25 to 44, 25.5% from 45 to 64, and 17.4% who were 65 years of age or older. The median age was 37.8 years. For every 100 females, there were 96.1 males. For every 100 females ages 18 and older, there were 96.2 males.

The 2016–2020 5-year American Community Survey estimates show that the median household income was $39,643 (with a margin of error of +/- $14,750) and the median family income was $38,393 (+/- $4,862). Females had a median income of $30,208 (+/- $20,146) for females. The median income for those above 16 years old was $31,528 (+/- $4,397). Approximately, 22.2% of families and 26.0% of the population were below the poverty line, including 46.2% of those under the age of 18 and 20.0% of those ages 65 or over.

=== 2010 census ===
As of the census of 2010, there were 126 people, 58 households, and 39 families residing in the city. The population density was 741.2 inhabitants per square mile (286.2/km^{2}). There were 65 housing units at an average density of 382.4 per square mile (147.6/km^{2}). The racial makeup of the city was 98.4% White, 0.8% Native American, and 0.8% from two or more races. Hispanic or Latino of any race were 2.4% of the population.

There were 58 households, of which 20.7% had children under the age of 18 living with them, 50.0% were married couples living together, 12.1% had a female householder with no husband present, 5.2% had a male householder with no wife present, and 32.8% were non-families. 32.8% of all households were made up of individuals, and 13.8% had someone living alone who was 65 years of age or older. The average household size was 2.17 and the average family size was 2.72.

The median age in the city was 50.5 years. 19% of residents were under the age of 18; 5.7% were between the ages of 18 and 24; 22.3% were from 25 to 44; 30.9% were from 45 to 64; and 22.2% were 65 years of age or older. The gender makeup of the city was 50.0% male and 50.0% female.

== Education ==
The community is served by Erie–Galesburg USD 101 public school district.

Galesburg High School was closed in 1967, through school unification. The Galesburg High School mascot was Pirates.

== Transportation ==
The nearest intercity bus stop is located in Chanute. Service is provided by Jefferson Lines on a route from Minneapolis to Tulsa.
