= Lad's Car =

American motor vehicle

Overview
- Type: Cyclecar
- Manufacturer: Niagara Motor Car Company
- Production: 1912–1914
- Assembly: Niagara Falls, New York

Body and chassis
- Body style: Runabout (car)

The Lad's Car was an American cyclecar automobile built between 1912 and 1914.

== History ==
The Niagara Motor Car Corporation of Niagara Falls, New York, built a 4 horsepower air-cooled, single-seater juvenile car with belt drive. Marketed as the Lad's Car, it was advertised as "providing mechanically minded children a 'sure-enough' motor vehicle, with a 'sure-enough' engine".

The car was priced at US$160 ($5,000 in 2023). The 72-inch wheelbase cyclecar had a choice of hood, and a kit version was available.

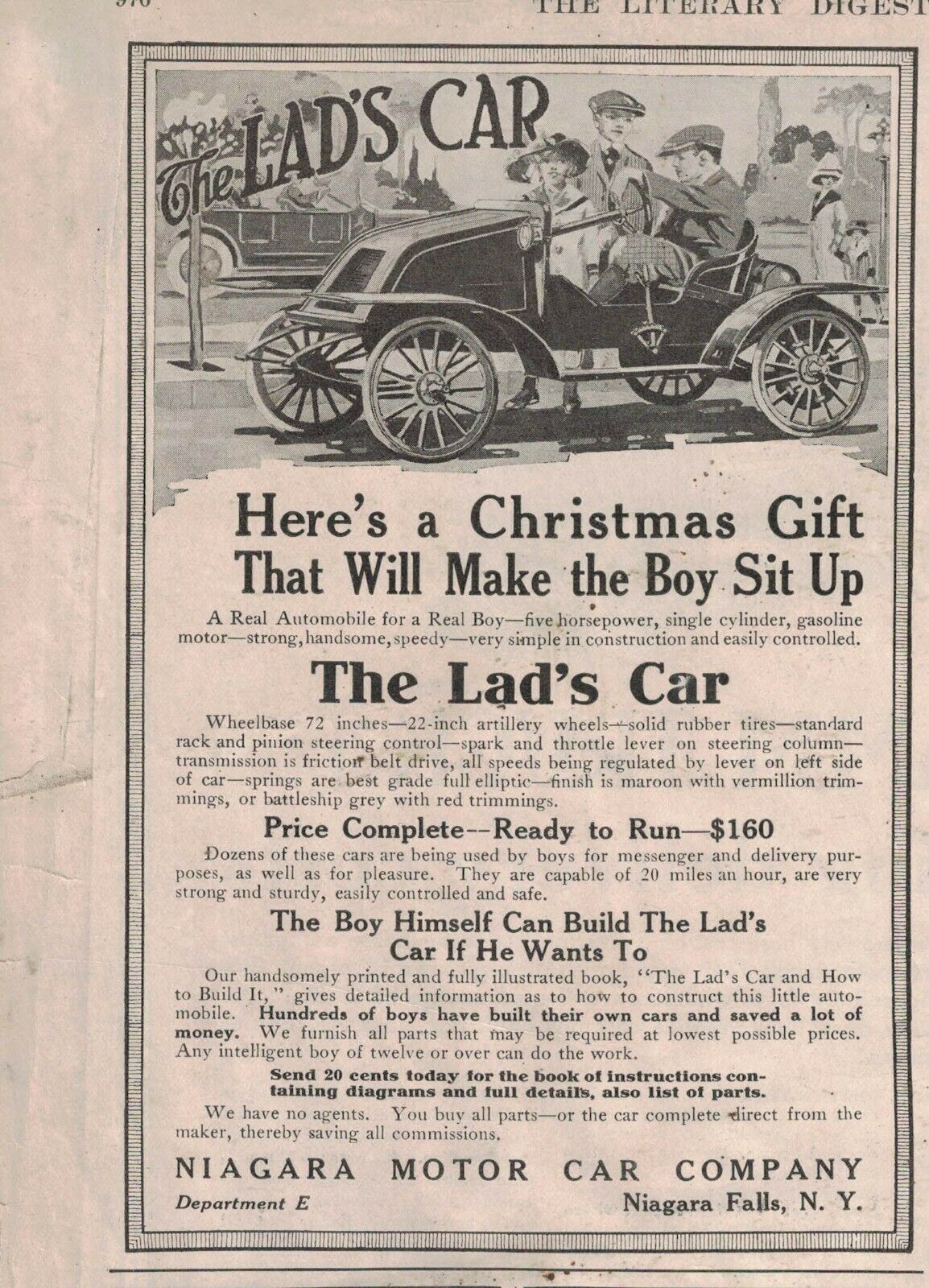
1912 Lad's Car Advertising

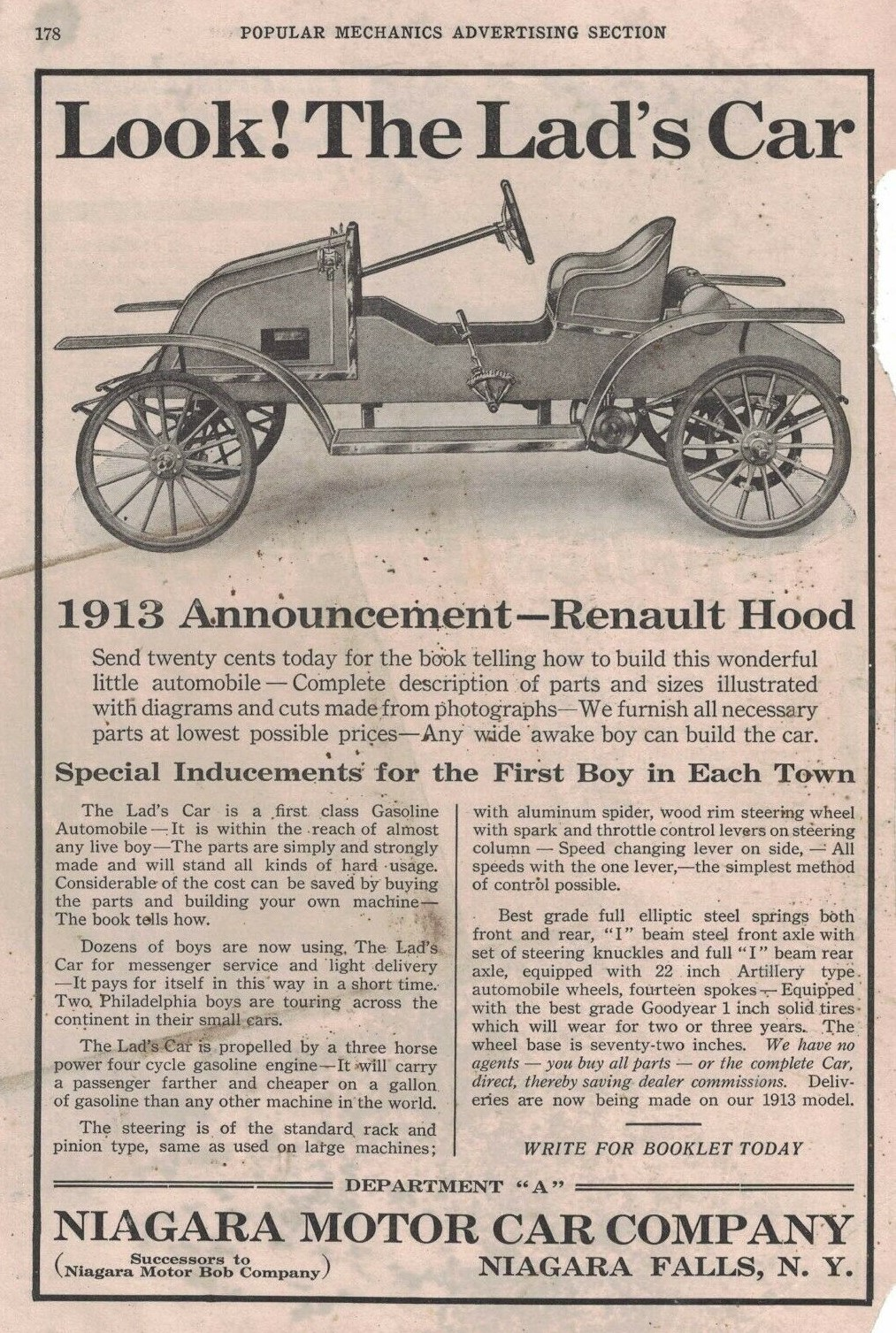
1913 Lad's Car advertising with new Renault hood

A working Lad’s Car exists in the Pierce-Arrow museum in Buffalo, NY.
