= Jefferson Lines =

Intercity bus operator in the Midwestern United States

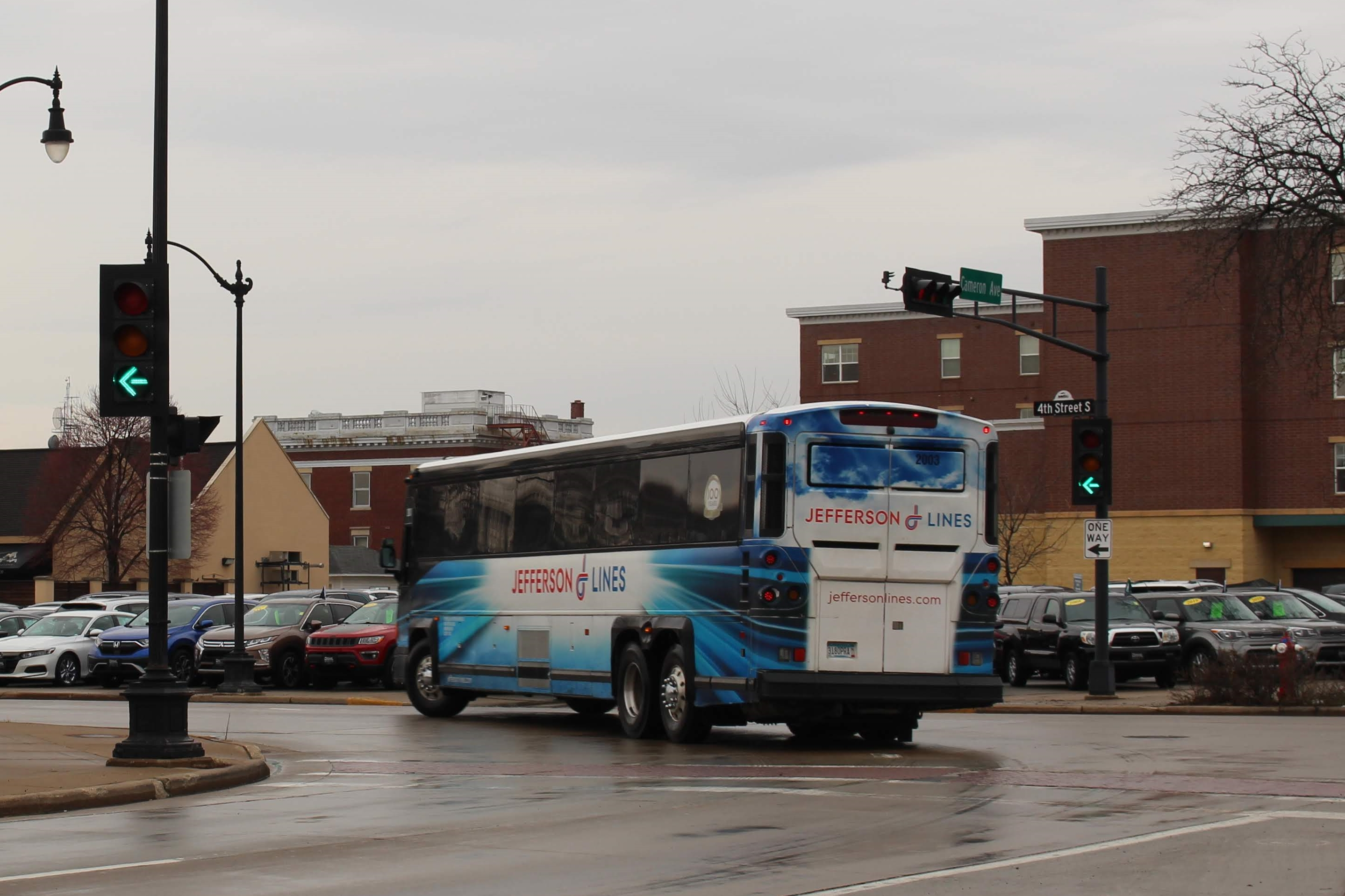
- A Jefferson Lines bus in La Crosse, Wisconsin
- Founded: 1919; 107 years ago
- Headquarters: Minneapolis, Minnesota
- Service area: North Central United States
- Service type: Intercity coach service
- Alliance: Greyhound Lines
- Chief executive: Steve Woelfel
- Website: jeffersonlines.com

Jefferson Lines (JL or JLI) is a regional intercity bus company operating in 17 states in the Midwest and the West of the United States. The company is operated by Jefferson Partners L.P., located in Minneapolis, Minnesota. Jefferson Partners also conducts charter bus service within Minneapolis and Billings for large group travel. The company is the second-largest bus company in the United States that operates from fixed stations.

== History ==
Jefferson Lines was founded in 1919 during the early days of motorcoach travel. The company's name originates from the Jefferson Highway, a north–south route in the early National Auto Trail system that once ran from Winnipeg, Manitoba, Canada, south to New Orleans, Louisiana. Jefferson expanded south of Kansas City in 1966, when it purchased Crown Coach.

By 1990, the company was believed to be the second-largest intercity bus company in the country after Continental Trailways was bought by Greyhound Lines. Jefferson went through bankruptcy in 1990 and was sold to a group led by Norwest Equity Partners. Charlie Zelle acquired a majority of Norwest's stake in 1998. Jefferson acquired the scheduled service of Jack Rabbit Lines in the Dakotas in 2000.

Jefferson Lines was the defendant in a 1994 Supreme Court case, Oklahoma Tax Commission v. Jefferson Lines. The state of Oklahoma filed a claim in Jefferson Lines' bankruptcy process, arguing that it was entitled to sales tax revenues on the full value of interstate bus tickets that were sold in Oklahoma. The court ruled in favor of the state, effectively overturning the precedent that it had set in 1948 in Central Greyhound Lines, Inc. v. Mealy. The Central Greyhound Lines decision had allowed states to levy sales taxes on interstate bus tickets, but only on the value of the ticket proportional to the mileage traveled within that state.

Intercity bus lines underwent many changes in the 2000s decade, after Greyhound Lines entered bankruptcy and shed a number of its routes. Jefferson Lines has taken over operation of many former Greyhound routes and improved ridership significantly on some of them. The service to Winnipeg was cut back to Grand Forks, North Dakota, on October 7, 2010.

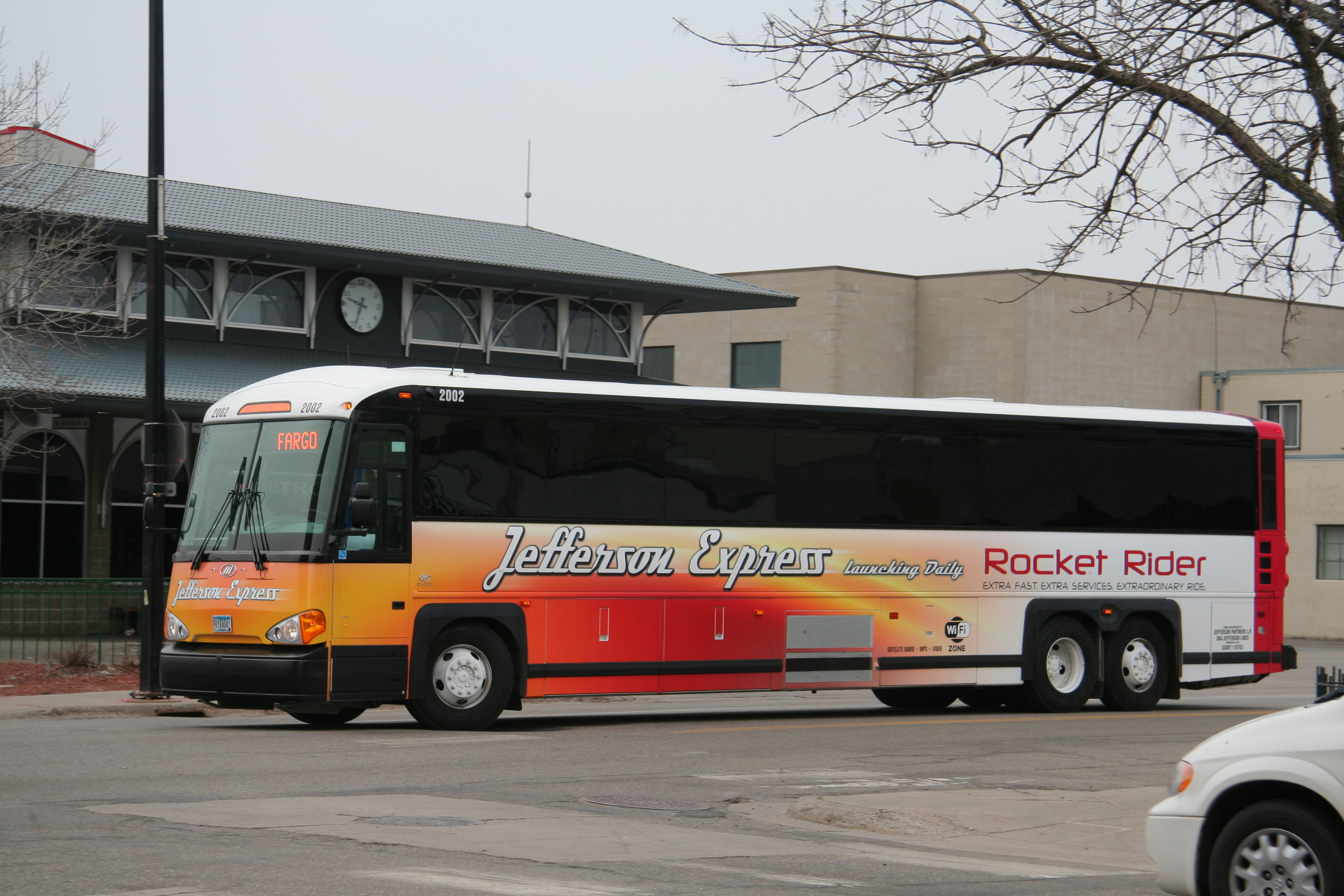
Jefferson Lines bus in St. Cloud, Minnesota promoting the "Rocket Rider" service, 2010

On May 15, 2013, Jefferson Lines expanded its service to the Minnesota Iron Range, including to Hibbing, where Greyhound Lines had been founded nearly a century earlier.

== Details ==
According to the company website, Jefferson Lines has 210 employees, including roughly 100 drivers. Jefferson Lines is a member of the American Bus Association, the United Motorcoach Association, and the National Tour Association. The company is reported to have 75 buses in its fleet. Jefferson Lines was voted the best transportation company in Minnesota in 2021 in Minnesota's Best contest of the Star Tribune.

Since 2004, some of the company's bus routes are subsidized by the state of Minnesota.

== Coverage ==
The company serves 17 states as of 2026:

- Arkansas
- Idaho
- Iowa
- Illinois
- Indiana
- Kansas
- Minnesota
- Missouri
- Montana
- Nebraska
- North Dakota
- Oklahoma
- South Dakota
- Tennessee
- Washington
- Wisconsin
- Wyoming

== Management ==
Steve Woelfel became president and CEO of Jefferson Lines in January 2013 after formerly serving as CFO of Jefferson Lines for eight years. Before his career at Jefferson, Woelfel was vice president and general manager of Fox Sports Net North.

Prior to Woelfel, the CEO of Jefferson Lines was Charlie Zelle. Zelle had been an investment banker in New York City until returning to Minnesota in 1987 to take over the company from his late father, Louie. Due to poor real-estate investments, such as in the St. Anthony Main project in Minneapolis, the company was in danger of foundering, but Zelle helped restructure the company under Chapter 11 bankruptcy in 1989 and 1990. The company was founded by Zelle's grandfather—Charlie Zelle marks the third generation of his family to work at Jefferson Lines. He owned 60% of the company as of 2010, with the remaining 40% owned by business partner Fred Kaiser of Texas. In 2012, Zelle was appointed Commissioner of the Minnesota Department of Transportation. Upon beginning his new position in January 2013, Zelle withdrew as a Jefferson employee with any management authority while remaining as the Chair of the Jefferson Lines Board of Directors. He is recused from matters associated with MnDOT and Jefferson Lines relationships.

== See also ==
- Intercity buses in the United States
