= Southeast Kansas League =

- Conference: Kansas State State High School Activities Association
- Founded: 1927-28.
- Commissioner: N/A
- Sports fielded: 16; men's: 9; women's: 7
- No. of teams: 7
- Headquarters: N/A, N/A
- Region: Southeast Kansas

The Southeast Kansas League is a high school athletic conference represented by seven schools in the southeast region of Kansas. The league offers championships for girls in basketball, cross country, golf, softball, tennis, track & field, and volleyball. In boys sports, the SEK offers championships in baseball, basketball, cross country, football, golf, soccer, tennis, track & field, and wrestling.

The league is referred to as "The SEK" or "SEK" when shortened. "SEKL" is never used.

There have been three different leagues known as the Southeast Kansas League. The original was a loose association and existed from 1908 to 1923. This league did not contest a football championship.

The second version of the SEK existed from 1923 to 1927. Another league, known as the Big Seven League, existed for two years, 1926 and 1927. Some SEK schools competed in the Big Seven at the same time.

The current incarnation of the SEK is the third and has existed since 1928. The original eight members were Chanute, Coffeyville, Columbus, Fort Scott, Independence, Iola, Parsons, and Pittsburg. Iola left for a short period from 1932 to 1936. Labette County joined prior to the 1968–69 school year. Ottawa was a league member for four years, 1987–88 to 1990–91. Ottawa is now a member of the Frontier League.

The conference was split into "Upper" and "Lower" divisions for football from 1981 to 2003 as the Kansas State High School Activities Association's district system made it no longer possible for every league team to play each other in football. In 2004, the league went back to a single division format for football but each school was not required to play each of the other eight as this is still not possible due to district assignments. The minimum number of league games required in football is five.

In November 2010, Iola's school board voted to switch its high school to the Pioneer League starting in 2012–13. In September 2011, Columbus' school board voted to switch to the Crawford-Neosho-Cherokee League starting in 2012–13, reducing the SEK's membership to seven schools.

Pittsburg and Parsons do not participate in league football. Pittsburg began playing as a football independent in 2016 when the playoff systems changed for Class 6A and 5A schools. Pittsburg cited a need to play larger schools in order to improve its seeding in the post-season.

Parsons began playing football as an independent in 2016 when the playoff systems changed for Class 4A schools to become similar to 6A and 5A while Class 3A changed to a modified district system. This left Parsons unable to play a full league schedule. Parsons administrators also expressed a desire to play competition closer to the school's level.

== List of member schools ==
School	Team Name	Colors	Enrollment (2019–20)	Football class*	Class for all other sports
Chanute High School	Blue Comets		584	4A	4A
Field Kindley High School	Golden Tornado		531	4A	4A
Fort Scott High School	Tigers		592	4A	4A
Independence High School	Bulldogs		581	4A	4A
Labette County High School	Grizzlies		490	4A	4A
Parsons High School	Vikings		363	3A	3A
Pittsburg High School	Purple Dragons		867	5A	5A

Field Kindley High School is located in Coffeyville and is usually referred to as "Coffeyville" in most newspapers and often by the students and school itself.

Labette County High School is located in Altamont.

== Former member schools ==
School	Team Name	Colors	Football class*	Class for all other sports	Year joined	Year left	Current league
Columbus Unified High School	Titans		3A	3A	1927	2011-12	Crawford-Neosho-Cherokee
Iola High School	Mustangs/Fillies		3A	4A	1927/1936	1932/2011-12	Pioneer
Ottawa High School	Cyclones		4A	4A	1987-88	1990-91	Frontier

*Classifications for football are set for two-year cycles with enrollment numbers from grades 9-11 from the school year before the cycle begins. For all other sports, enrollment numbers from grades 9-12 are used to determine classes for the current school year.

== Notable athletes ==
- Adam LaRoche and Andy LaRoche graduated from Fort Scott. Adam was a first baseman for several major league teams while Andy was a former major league infielder.
- Shaun Hill graduated from Parsons. He played quarterback for several National Football League teams.
- Fred Kipp graduated from Iola. He was a pitcher for the Brooklyn Dodgers, Los Angeles Dodgers and New York Yankees.
- Kerry Meier graduated from Pittsburg. He was a wide receiver for the Atlanta Falcons. Brother Shad, also a PHS graduate, was a tight end for the Tennessee Titans.
- Bill Russell (baseball) was a 1966 graduate of Pittsburg and played basketball for the Purple Dragons (they did not field a baseball team at the time). He played 18 seasons for the Los Angeles Dodgers (1969–86) and managed the team from 1996 to 1998.
- Scott Hastings played for Independence, which won the SEK and State in 1977. He went on to play for the Detroit Pistons in the NBA and won the NBA Finals in 1990
