= Dylan Meier =

American football player (1984–2010)

- Meier in 2007.

No. 9
- Position: Quarterback

Personal information
- Born: March 16, 1984; Pittsburg, Kansas
- Died: April 19, 2010 (aged 26); Arkansas
- Listed height: 6 ft 2 in (1.88 m)
- Listed weight: 211 lb (96 kg)

Career information
- College: Kansas State

Career history
- 2007–2008: Dresden Monarchs
- 2009: Rhinos Milano

Dylan Meier (March 16, 1984 – April 19, 2010) was an American football quarterback. Meier played collegiality at Kansas State and professionally for the Dresden Monarchs of the German Football League and Rhinos Milano of the Italian Football League.

Meier was the younger brother of former NFL tight end Shad Meier and older brother of Atlanta Falcons wide receiver Kerry Meier.

== Early life ==
Born to Dennis and Valerie Meier, he was the middle brother. Oldest brother Shad is a former NFL tight end for the Tennessee Titans, next older brother Adam played football at Pittsburg State University, and younger brother Kerry played at Kansas as a wide receiver and backup quarterback who played for the Atlanta Falcons.

== High school career ==
At Pittsburg High School, Meier was a two-time first team all-state selection and was named an honorable mention All-American. Meier was ranked 80th by Rivals.com on its list of top recruits in the country. He was coached by Merle Clark.

Meier threw for 1,465 yards and 14 touchdowns, while rushing for 935 yards and 10 touchdowns as a senior. Meier led Pittsburg to back-to-back appearances in the Class 5A state title game. He also lettered three times in baseball, twice in basketball and once in track.

== College career ==
=== 2003 ===
Meier appeared in all 15 games as the holder, while playing in four games at Quarterback. He emerged as the Wildcats’ No. 2 quarterback at the end of the season. In this his first college season he saw his first playing time against McNeese State, completing 5 of 8 passes for 78 yards and two interceptions, while rushing four times for 46 yards and scoring his first career touchdowns. He was Kansas State's third leading rusher with 149 yards on 16 attempts while also leading the team in yards per carry (9.3) and was third in rushing for touchdowns with three. He saw his most extensive action in 2003 at Iowa State, completing 4 of 5 passes for a season-best 51 yards and rushing for 76 yards on nine carries.

=== 2004 ===
Meier opened his sophomore season as the starting quarterback, becoming the first Kansan to do so in the Bill Snyder era. He played in 10 games with six starts and completing 127 of 220 passes (57.7 percent) for 1,436 yards, nine touchdowns and five interceptions. He posted a quarterback rating of 121.51 which ranked seventh in the Big 12. He ran for 232 yards on 81 attempts and was Kansas State's third-leading rusher.

His best outing of this season may have been in an away game against Texas A&M, where he recorded career highs in completions (29), attempts (45) and touchdowns (3). His completion total, which included connections to eight different receivers, was just four shy of Kansas State's single-game record. Though Meier was not in shape to start at Kansas the following week, he nevertheless came off the bench in the second half to register a career-high for passing yards (249). In this contest he threw for two scores, including a career-long 86-yard fourth quarter touchdown to wide receiver Tony Madison, and augmented this by running the ball himself for a third touchdown against the Jayhawks. He registered his third consecutive two hundred plus yard passing performance against Oklahoma while completing 20-of-38 attempts for 242 yards. In this game he connected with WR Yamon Figurs for a 38-yard touchdown strike in the second quarter to give Wildcats 14–7 edge.

He was 12-of-18 passing for 183 yards vs. Western Kentucky in his first career start. He gained 60 yards on nine attempts on the ground against WKU with a nine-yard touchdown run. He tossed his first career touchdown vs. Fresno State, connecting with Davin Dennis from 47 yards out. He completed 26 passes on 41 attempts for his fourth career 200+ yard passing day (248) against Texas Tech. He connected with seven different receivers vs. the Red Raiders and was K-State's leading rusher with 84 yards on 16 carries. He came off the bench in the fourth quarter at Colorado with 3:15 to play and drove the Wildcats to the game-tying touchdown with 0:36 remaining. He finished 7-of-11 passing on the drive for 63 yards, including a 17-yard touchdown pass to WR Jermaine Moreira. He earned his team's Ken Ochs Courage Award for his grit and determination in the face of injuries during the season.

=== Junior (2005) ===
Meier did not play due to an injury.

=== Senior (2006) ===
After missing the entire 2005 season, Meier started the first five games of the season, passing for 773 yards (70-of-138). He appeared in 11-of-12 games either as a holder on placements or at quarterback. He completed 10 or more passes in each of the first five games. He was an effective 10-of-20 for 125 yards and two touchdowns in the win over Florida Atlantic. He had a season-best 135.5 rating against the Owls. He threw for a career-high 256 yards on 19-for-35 passing against Marshall. He was 15-of-26 for 163 yards in the season opener against Illinois State. He also came off the bench for one series against Texas, hitting on his lone attempt for eight yards. He led K-State to a 6–3 record as a starter.

== European career ==
=== Germany (2007–2008) ===
Meier played for the Dresden Monarchs in the German Football League.

=== Italy (2009) ===
Meier played for the Milano Rhinos in the Italian Football League.

== Death ==
On April 19, 2010, Meier died in a reported accident while hiking in Arkansas. It was later reported he died after falling from a cliff while hiking with family members. Meier slipped while attempting to climb up a rock to get a better view and fell over 100 feet. Prior to his death he was set to travel to Korea to teach English.
