= P. J. Forbes =

American baseball player (born 1967)

- Infielder
- Born: September 22, 1967 (age 57); Pittsburg, Kansas, U.S.
- Batted: Right Threw: Right

MLB debut
- July 21, 1998, for the Baltimore Orioles

Last MLB appearance
- October 7, 2001, for the Philadelphia Phillies

MLB statistics
- Batting average: .176
- Home runs: 0
- Runs batted in: 3
- Stats at Baseball Reference

Teams
- Baltimore Orioles (1998); Philadelphia Phillies (2001)

Patrick Joseph Forbes (born September 22, 1967) is an American former professional baseball infielder, who played in Major League Baseball (MLB) from 1998 to 2001 for the Baltimore Orioles and Philadelphia Phillies. He was later a minor league baseball manager in the Pittsburgh Pirates and Los Angeles Dodgers organizations.

== Playing career ==
=== Amateur career ===
He played in high school at St. Mary's-Colgan High School in Pittsburg, Kansas, and played for four years for Wichita State University, during which he was a vital part of the Shockers' 1989 College World Series championship squad. In 1988, he played collegiate summer baseball with the Chatham A's of the Cape Cod Baseball League.

=== California Angels ===
Forbes was drafted by the California Angels in the 20th round of the 1990 amateur draft. He began his professional career with the Boise Hawks in the Northwest League in 1990. He then played with the Palm Springs Angels of the California League in 1991, the Quad Cities River Bandits of the Midwest League in 1992 and the Midland Angels of the Texas League in 1993.

From 1994 to 1996 he played in AAA with the Vancouver Canadians of the Pacific Coast League.

=== Baltimore Orioles ===
He signed as a minor league free agent with the Baltimore Orioles on January 14, 1997. He spent most of the next three seasons with the Rochester Red Wings of the International League. Forbes made his Major League debut as a defensive replacement for the Orioles at second base in the ninth inning on July 21, 1998 against the Oakland Athletics. In his first start, on July 26, 1998 against the Seattle Mariners he was hitless in three at-bats. In 9 games with the Orioles in 1998, he had only one hit in 10 at-bats. His one hit, the first of his Major League career, was an RBI single to left field in the ninth inning on July 31, 1998 off Jim Pittsley of the Kansas City Royals. He was elected to the Rochester Red Wings Hall of Fame in 2006.

=== Texas Rangers ===
He was sent to the Texas Rangers as part of a conditional deal on May 27, 1999 and played for the Oklahoma RedHawks in 22 games during that season.

=== Philadelphia Phillies ===
Forbes signed as a minor league free agent with the Philadelphia Phillies on November 2, 1999. He remained in the Phillies system through 2002, playing mostly with the Scranton/Wilkes-Barre Red Barons in AAA. He did play in three games for the Phillies in the 2001 season and has two hits in seven at-bats.

== Managerial career ==
He began his managerial career in the Phillies organization with the Class A Lakewood BlueClaws in 2004-05. He then managed the class AA Reading Phillies from 2006-08. He began managing in the Pittsburgh Pirates' system in 2009 with the Lynchburg Hillcats in the Carolina League. After the Pirates swapped Single A teams with Cincinnati Reds, Forbes spent 2010 the manager of the Pirates' new affiliate in the Florida State League, the Bradenton Marauders. After the season, Forbes was promoted and spent 2011 and 2012 as the manager of the Pirates' AA affiliate, the Altoona Curve. After the 2012 season, Forbes left the Pirates organization.

In 2013, he joined the Los Angeles Dodgers organization as manager of the Arizona League Dodgers in the Arizona Rookie League and he was then promoted to manage the Rancho Cucamonga Quakes of the California League for 2014. He resigned his job with the Quakes on February 2, 2015, citing family reasons.
