= St. Mary's-Colgan High School =

St. Mary's Colgan High School
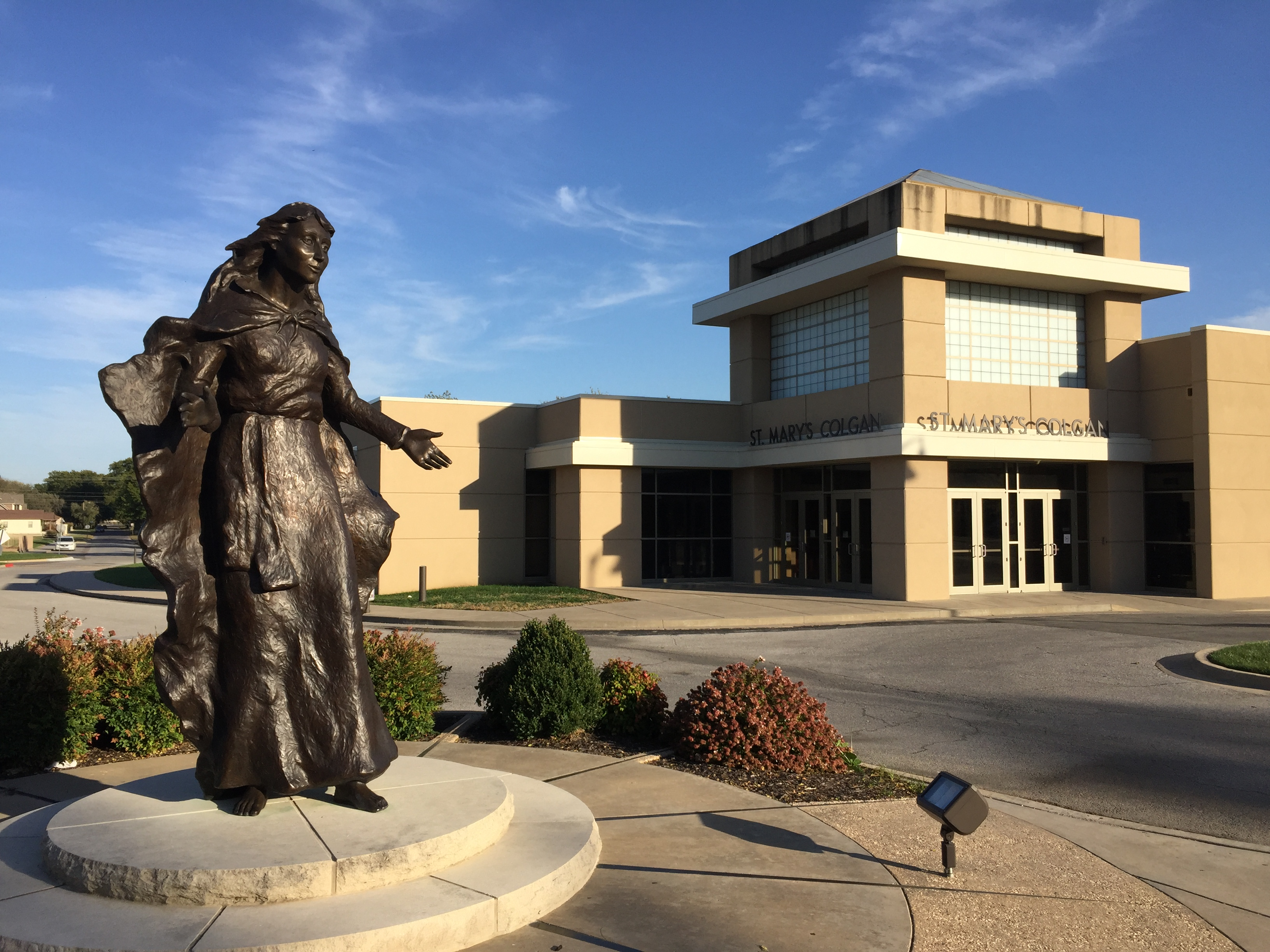
- St. Mary's Colgan High School (2016)

Location
- 212 East 9th Street; Pittsburg, Kansas 66762; United States; 37°24′57″N 94°42′9″W

Information
- Type: Parochial
- Motto: Faith Excellence Tradition
- Religious affiliation: Roman Catholic
- Established: 1936
- Oversight: Roman Catholic Diocese of Wichita
- CEEB code: 053404
- Administrator: Fr. Mike Simone
- Principal: Tim Conrad
- Elementary School Principal: Kristen O'Brien
- Pastor: Fr. Mike Simone
- Chaplain: Fr. Andrew Labenz
- Grades: PreK to 12
- Colors: Blue and white
- Athletics conference: Cherokee-Neosho-Crawford (CNC) League
- Mascot: Panthers
- Team name: Panthers
- Rival: Frontenac High School
- Newspaper: The Marianette
- Yearbook: The Image
- Website: School Website

St. Mary's Colgan High School is a parochial, Roman Catholic high school in Pittsburg, Kansas in the Roman Catholic Diocese of Wichita. It is under the direction of Our Lady of Lourdes Catholic Parish.

== School History ==
=== Establishment ===
The high school was established in 1936 and was initially named St. Mary's High School.

=== 1940s ===
The first graduating class occurred in 1940 with 23 graduates. In 1941, the first yearbook, The Marian was published, and the school song was written. The first basketball team began in 1940 and the school became a member of the Kansas State High School Athletics Association in 1941. Several clubs were formed during this time such as the boys' and girls' glee club, orchestra, camera club, Latin club, choir, chemistry and biology club, math club, and Quill and Scroll. The Sodality of the Blessed Virgin Mary was also organized in 1942. The first school newspaper, The Marianette, was also started in 1942.

=== 1950s ===
The "Sadie Hawkins Day" began in 1950. A new rectory was constructed in 1950 as well and the first basketball game was held in the new gym in 1951. The song "Goodnight Night Irene" became the school song after it was sung following the football team won a game. The first band also began in the 1950s. The first school play, Calvary Hill was held in 1952. Three new tabernacles were constructed by the end of 1952. The pep club began in 1956 and the forensics program began in the mid-1950s.

=== 1960s ===
During the 1960s, the school was under the leadership of five different administrators and four different principals. In 1960, St. Mary's High School moved out of the third floor of the Elementary School and across the street to its own building. The class of 1960 was the first to graduate from the new building. The National Honor Society and Student Council were established in the 1960s. The first school musical, Brigadoon, was performed in 1968. Also during this time, the yearbook was changed from The Marian to The Image. The name of the school was changed in 1967 to Colgan Regional High School with enrollment anticipated to be supported by surrounding parishes.

=== 1970s ===
Name Changes
1936:	St. Mary's High School
1967:	Colgan Regional High School
1987:	Colgan-St. Mary's High School
1989:	St. Mary's-Colgan High School

Several drama productions continued into the 1970s including Arsenic and Old Lace, Finian's Rainbow, and Cinderella. Organized girls' sports began in the early 1970s. Girls' track and field and tennis began in 1973, followed by volleyball and basketball in 1974. Pom pom began in 1975. Several state championships were won in football and baseball. Boys' golf began in 1978.

=== 1980s ===
Our Lady of Lourdes Parish celebrated its 100th anniversary in 1981. Also in 1981, the debate and forensics/debate programs were founded. The speech program experienced early success with state championships in 1985 and 1986, as well as several individual state championships. The drama department continued to produce plays including Oliver!, Joseph and the Amazing Technicolor Dreamcoat, My Fair Lady, Camelot, Harvey, Oklahoma!, and You're a Good Man Charlie Brown. During the spring of 1988, the Alumni Association organized and produced the original version of Calvary Hill. In 1987, the school was renamed to Colgan-St. Mary's High School. In 1989, the name was switched to St. Mary's-Colgan High School.

=== 1990s ===
The St. Mary's Activity Center was completed in 1991. Incorporated in the approximate 2,800 square feet of the activity center was a new lunchroom, gymnasium, and several shower facilities for the athletic teams. In addition, two new meeting areas, an after-school program and a religious gift shop housed in the activity center. Several upgrades and additions were completed in the 1990s. The high school heat and air were updated. A 14,000 square-foot addition to the high school building was completed. This addition included two high school science labs, a junior high science lab, and four junior high classrooms with a library and media center accessed by both the high school and junior high. This moved the junior high out of the grade school and into the high school building. The auditorium was renovated which added two classrooms in addition to the new theater. Several state championships were won in the 1990s including Scholar's Bowl, boys' track and field, baseball, boys' basketball, and boys' golf.

=== 2000s ===
In April 2004, a new 12,000 square foot building housing the religious gift store, weight room, and mechanical shop opened at the corner of 10th and Locust. The weight room moved from the basement of the McCullough Gym to the new fitness center. Due to anonymous donations, the St. Mary's Colgan Fieldhouse was built north of the Elementary school, across 10th Street. In 2008, a commons area was added to the front of the high school building. The addition is the location of several meetings, youth activities, and informal gatherings during lunch and before and after school. Included in the addition was new administrative office space and a new teacher's lounge, as well as a more secure entrance. A group for high school boys called Knights of Our Lady was started. They would meet weekly to pray a rosary and share a meal. Similarly, GRACE was started for high school girls who met to pray a chaplet and share a meal. The football program experienced a large amount of success during the decade including a 66-game winning streak between the 2000–2005 seasons. Several state championships were won throughout the decade in chess, football, boys' basketball, baseball, and boys' golf.

=== 2010s ===
In 2010, a new rectory was built on the footprint of the former rectory. The parish office was moved into the renovated office building at the corner of 9th and Locust and no longer located in the rectory. The speech and debate program earned membership in the National Speech and Debate Association's 100 Club, making them ranked in the top 10% nationally. In 2013, the glee club was revived, performing at intermission of the fall play. Plays throughout the decade included The Wizard of Oz, A Christmas Story, The Sound of Music, Cinderella, and Into the Woods, as well programs to honor veterans. A major Church renovation was completed in 2017. In October 2017, a new altar was dedicated and reopened by the Church. Plaster was repaired and walls repainted, as well as new pews, tile flooring on the altar and aisles with carpet under the pews, saint medallions were added on the ceiling and the crucifix was suspended above the altar. In other facility upgrades on campus, a free-standing weight room was added, just west of the practice field. The former weight room was partially incorporated into the Bargain Corner (formerly called the Goodwill) while the remaining part was turned into a small event space or meeting room for the parish/school called Guadalupe Hall.

In the 2018–19 school year, the Communities System began. It consisted of organizing the student body into houses, similar to homerooms, with a mixture of grades in each house. Within the high school, three houses form each community. The students chose to name their communities: St. Padre Pio, St. Teresa of Calcutta and St. Maximilian Kolbe. Three seniors and three juniors serve as the captains. The community system fosters the building of relationships across grade and class boundaries. State championships won through the decade included boys' golf, softball, and baseball.

=== 2020s ===
Due to the outbreak of COVID-19, in-person school attendance was cancelled the week prior to spring break. There were no spring sports and the spring play, Joseph and the Amazing Technicolor Dreamcoat, was cancelled after weeks of rehearsal. There was no prom, senior retreat, May Crowning or graduation. Volunteers delivered sack lunches to the homes of students who signed up. All Masses were cancelled. During the 2020s, the girls' golf program three-peated from 2020 to 2022. The school also won a state championship in softball.

== Athletic activities ==
St. Mary's-Colgan provides a wide variety of athletic programs. Athletic teams are known as the "Panthers" and classified as a 2A school according to the KSHSAA.

=== Football ===
One of the most successful sports programs at St. Mary's-Colgan is the football team, which has won seven state championships and has produced several collegiate athletes. From 1974 to 2003, the St. Mary's-Colgan football team had seven undefeated seasons. Additionally, the team won 66 consecutive games from 2001 to 2004. The football team competes on Hutchinson Field which it shares with other local schools as allowed by the Pittsburg Community Schools.

=== Baseball ===
Baseball has been the most successful program during the history of St. Mary's-Colgan. Throughout its history, the Panther baseball team has won 23 state championships and has produced a few collegiate athletes, similar to the football program. The Panther baseball team made a total of 30 championship game appearances from 1964 to 2011. St. Mary's-Colgan went on a 7-peat state championship winning streak from 2004 to 2010.

=== State Championships ===
State Championships
Season	Sport	Number of Championships	Year
Fall	Football	7	1974, 1975, 1984, 2000, 2001, 2002, 2003
Fall	Golf, Girls	4	2020, 2021, 2022, 2024
Fall	Chess	1	2000
Winter	Basketball, Boys	5	1996, 2000, 2002, 2005, 2008
Spring	Golf, Boys	4	1996, 2009, 2010, 2011
Spring	Baseball	23	1964, 1967, 1971, 1976, 1993, 1997, 1998, 1999, 2001, 2004, 2005, 2006, 2007, 2008, 2009, 2010, 2013, 2014, 2015, 2016, 2023, 2025, 2026
Spring	Softball	4	2010, 2019, 2021, 2026
Spring	Track and Field	1	1993
Total		49	

St. Mary's Colgan High School offers the following sports:

=== Fall ===
- Football
- Volleyball
- Boys Cross-Country
- Girls Cross-Country
- Girls Golf
- Boys Soccer
- Girls Tennis
- Fall Cheerleading

=== Winter ===
- Boys Basketball
- Girls Basketball
- Winter Cheerleading

=== Spring ===
- Baseball
- Boys Golf
- Softball
- Boys Track and Field
- Girls Track and Field
- Girls Soccer

== Notable alumni ==
- Barry Dean, country/pop/rock songwriter who has co-written such songs as "Girls Chase Boys" sung by Ingrid Michaelson
- P.J. Forbes (1984), former MLB player

== Gallery ==
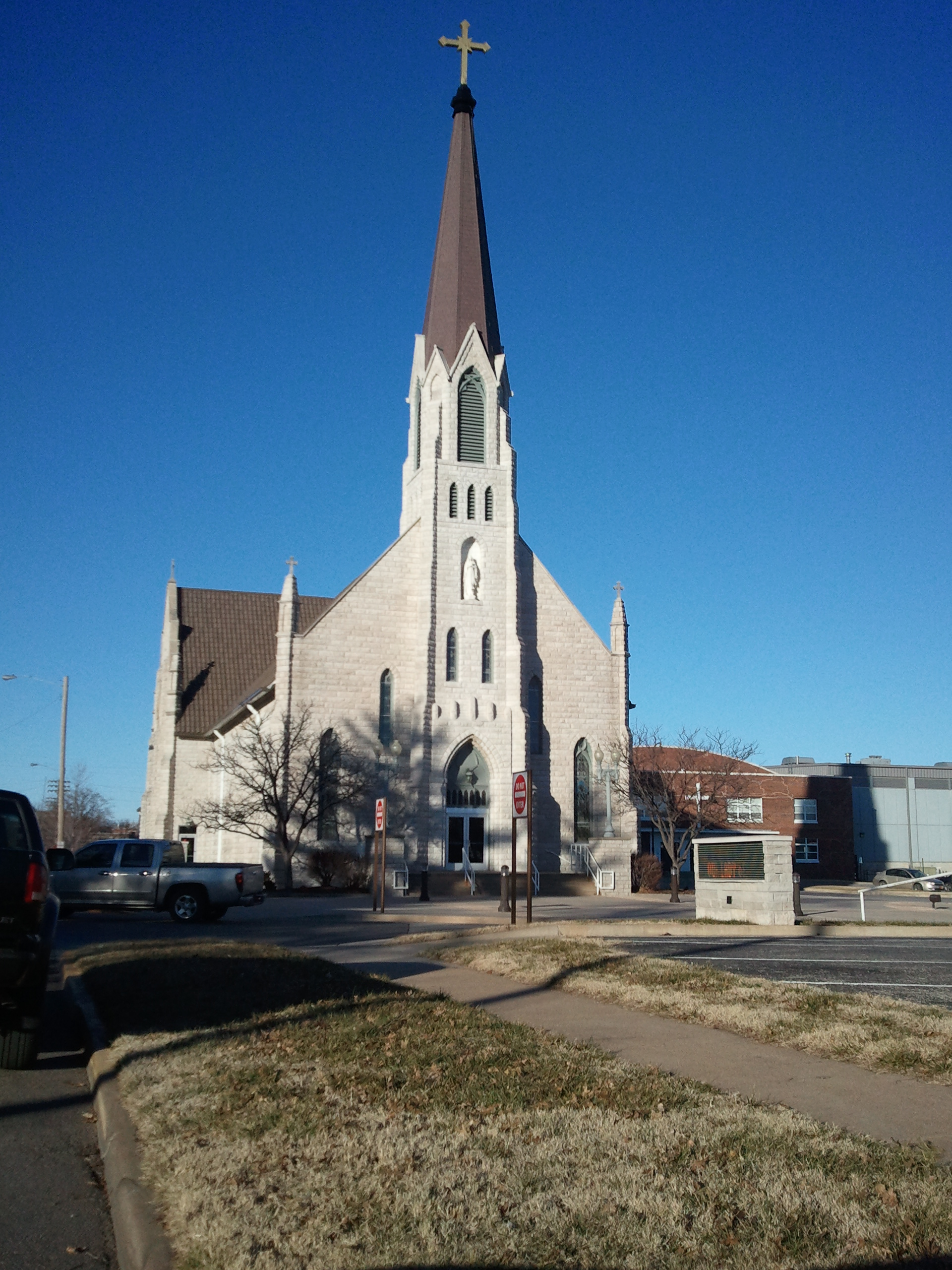
Our Lady Of Lourdes church (2012)

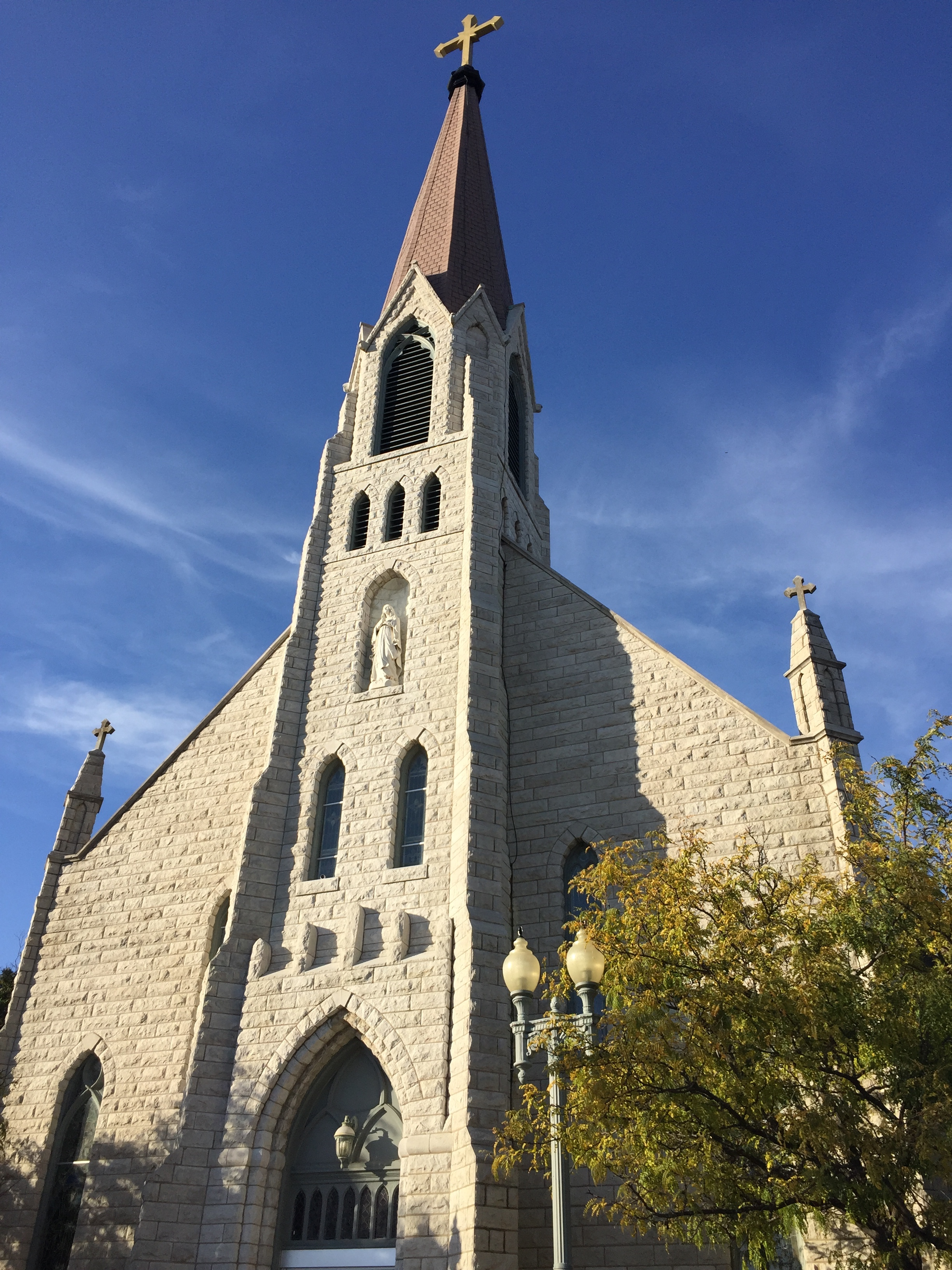
A view of the church (2016)

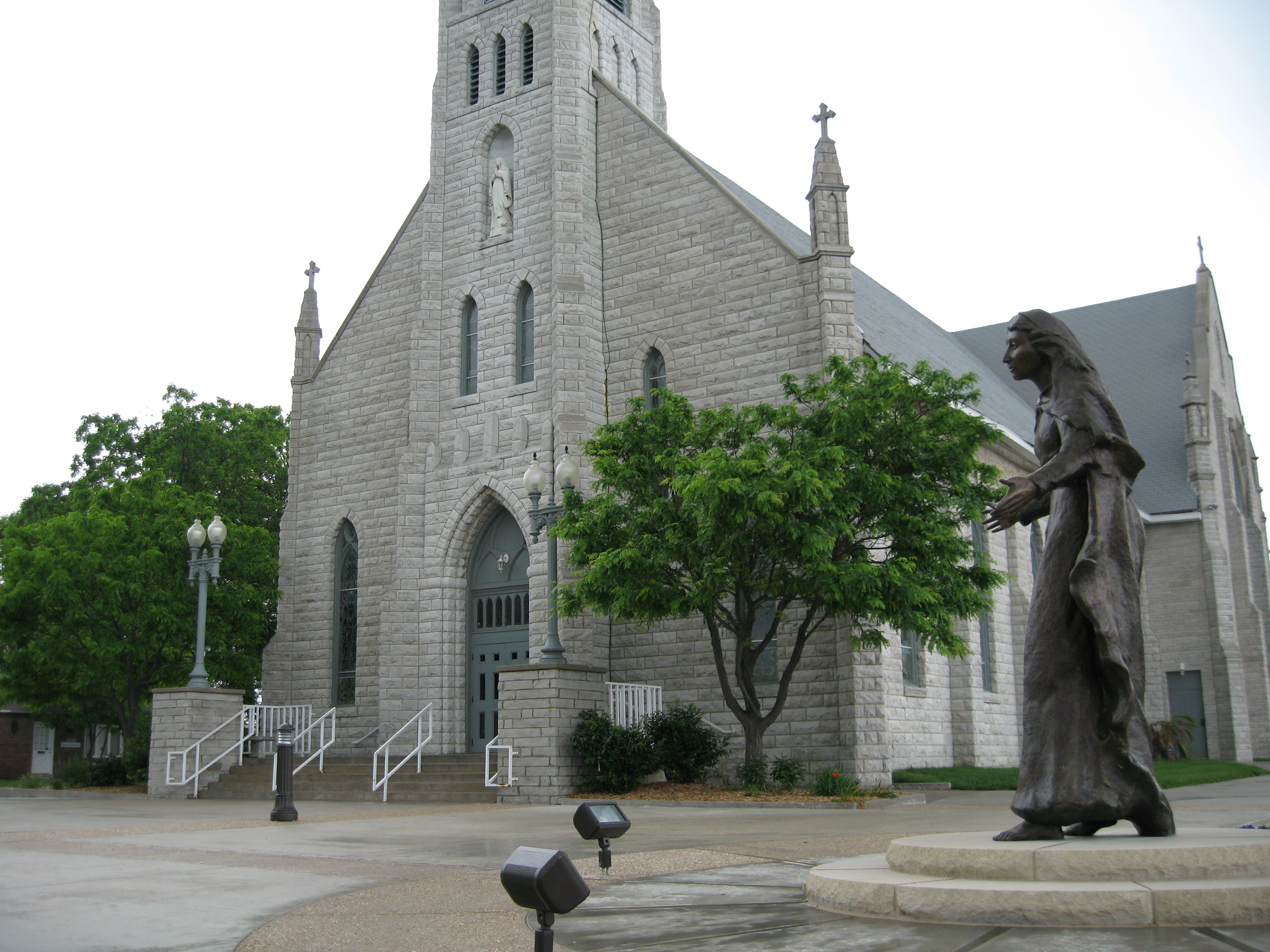

== See also ==
- List of high schools in Kansas
- List of unified school districts in Kansas
