= Chanute High School =

School in Chanute, Kansas, U.S.

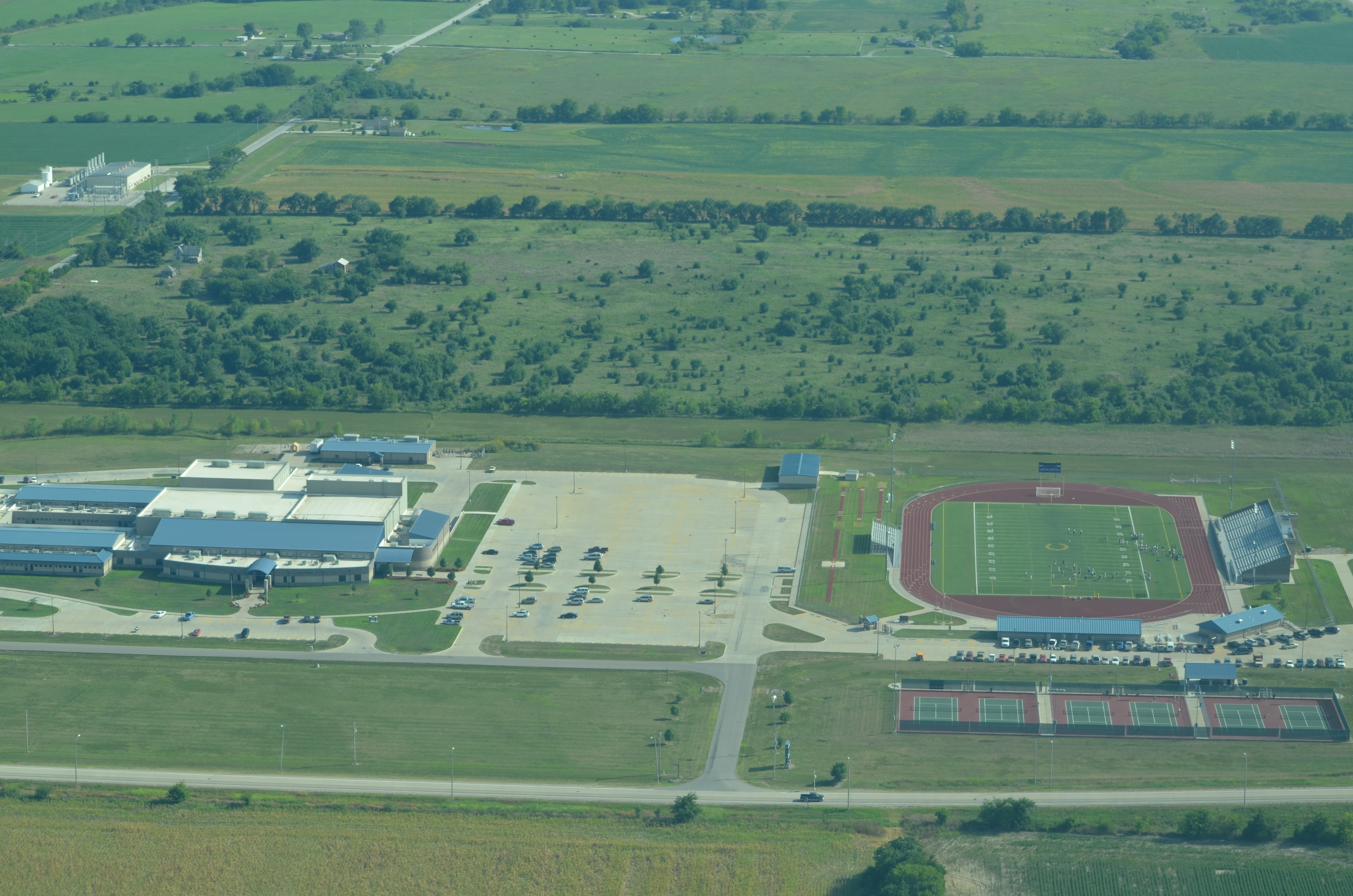
- Aerial photo of high school (2013)

Location
- 1501 West 36th Street; Chanute, Kansas 66720; United States; 37°38′37″N 95°28′23″W

Information
- School type: Public
- Motto: Students First
- Established: 1914
- School district: Chanute USD 413
- CEEB code: 170515
- Principal: Zack Murry
- Teaching staff: 34.20 (FTE)
- Grades: 9-12
- Enrollment: 558 (2023–2024)
- Average class size: 16.61
- Campus type: Rural
- Colors: Columbia blue and gold
- Athletics: KSHSAA 4A
- Athletics conference: Southeast Kansas League
- Team name: Blue Comets
- Rival: Pittsburg High School
- Newspaper: The Comet
- Website: www.usd413.org

Chanute High School is a public secondary school in Chanute, Kansas, United States, and operated by Chanute USD 413 school district.

== Campus ==
The school's current building was completed in 2008.

== Curriculum ==
Chanute High School offers a variety of courses, including concurrent classes through Neosho County Community College. With the construction of the new high school in 2008, a new trade building was completed. Welding and construction classes are offered as well as Advanced Placement classes. AP Calculus AB, AP European History, AP English Language and Composition and AP English Literature are taught currently.

Foreign languages courses include Spanish I-IV.

== Extracurricular activities ==
Student groups and activities at Chanute High School include Blue Comet Bands, Chess Club, Blue Comet Debate League, Blue Comet Forensics League, drama, Dungeons & Dragons, Family, Career and Community Leaders of America, Fellowship of Christian Athletes, Foreign Language Club, Future Business Leaders of America, HOSA (organization), history club, Kansas Future Educators of America, Leadership club, Model United Nations, National Honor Society, SkillsUSA, Student Government, Talent Search, Teen Age Republicans, Upward Bound, and vocal/choral music. In 2012, Gay/Straight Alliance was formed by the students.

The school's athletic teams, known as the Chanute Blue Comets, compete in Kansas State High School Activities Association size classification 4A. Teams are fielded in baseball, men's and women's basketball, cross country, football, men's and women's soccer, softball, spirit, men's and women's tennis, track, volleyball, men's and women's golf, unified bowling, and wrestling.

== Notable alumni ==
- Jimmy Allen - former lead guitarist and founder of rock band, Puddle of Mudd.
- Edwin Bideau - lawyer and politician
- Jennifer Knapp - Grammy-nominated singer and songwriter.
- Paul Lindblad - former MLB player (Kansas City Athletics, Washington Senators, Texas Rangers, New York Yankees).
- Ralph Miller - (class of 1937) - former college men's basketball coach

== See also ==
- List of high schools in Kansas
- List of unified school districts in Kansas
