= Opolis, Kansas =

Unincorporated community in Crawford County, Kansas

- CDP
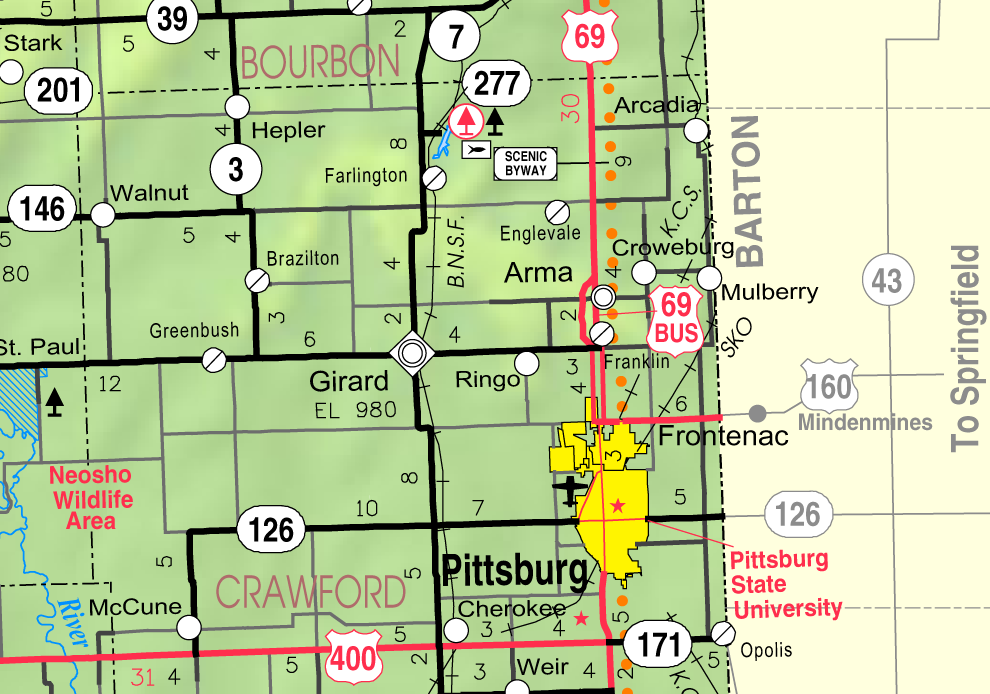
- KDOT map of Crawford County (legend)

- Location within Kansas Location within the United States
- Coordinates: 37°20′41″N 94°37′28″W
- Country: United States
- State: Kansas
- County: Crawford
- Founded: 1868
- Platted: 1868
- Named for: polis
- Elevation: 932 ft (284 m)

Population (2020)
  - Total: 104
- Time zone: UTC-6 (CST)
  - Summer (DST): UTC-5 (CDT)
- Area code: 620
- FIPS code: 20-52925
- GNIS ID: 2806537

Opolis is a census-designated place (CDP) in Crawford County, Kansas, United States. As of the 2020 census, the population was 104.

== History ==
Opolis was originally called Stateline (from the community's proximity to the Missouri state line), and under the latter name was laid out in 1868. Opolis is derived from the Greek polis, meaning "city".

The first post office in Opolis was established in December 1868. The post office was also called Stevenstown, Steventown, and Olopolis for some time in its early history. It has a ZIP Code of 66760.

== Geography ==
Opolis is located in the South Eastern corner of the state of Kansas close to the Missouri state line, approximately 133 miles (210 km) due south of Kansas City, Kansas, at latitude 37.344 and longitude -94.621. It has an estimated population of 117 with 54 houses (based on a ZIP Code estimate from the year 2000) and covers 0.7743 square miles (2.01 km^{2}) of land. The elevation is 932 feet (284 m) above sea level. Opolis appears on the Asbury United States Geological Survey Map. It is in the Central Time Zone and observes Daylight Saving Time.

== Demographics ==
Historical population
Census	Pop.	Note	%±
2020	104		—
U.S. Decennial Census

The 2020 United States census counted 104 people, 47 households, and 34 families in Opolis. The population density was 151.8 per square mile (58.6/km^{2}). There were 47 housing units at an average density of 68.6 per square mile (26.5/km^{2}). The racial makeup was 92.31% (96) white or European American (86.54% non-Hispanic white), 0.96% (1) black or African-American, 0.0% (0) Native American or Alaska Native, 0.0% (0) Asian, 0.0% (0) Pacific Islander or Native Hawaiian, 0.0% (0) from other races, and 6.73% (7) from two or more races. Hispanic or Latino of any race was 6.73% (7) of the population.

Of the 47 households, 44.7% had children under the age of 18; 46.8% were married couples living together; 23.4% had a female householder with no spouse or partner present. 21.3% of households consisted of individuals and 12.8% had someone living alone who was 65 years of age or older. The percent of those with a bachelor's degree or higher was estimated to be 0.0% of the population.

11.5% of the population was under the age of 18, 14.4% from 18 to 24, 25.0% from 25 to 44, 26.9% from 45 to 64, and 22.1% who were 65 years of age or older. The median age was 43.7 years. For every 100 females, there were 50.7 males. For every 100 females ages 18 and older, there were 58.6 males.

== Education ==
The community is served by Pittsburg USD 250 public school district.
