= Shad Meier =

American football player (born 1978)

No. 84
- Position: Tight end

Personal information
- Born: June 7, 1978 (age 48); St. Louis, Missouri, U.S.
- Listed height: 6 ft 4 in (1.93 m)
- Listed weight: 255 lb (116 kg)

Career information
- High school: Pittsburg
- College: Kansas State
- NFL draft: 2001: 3rd round, 90th overall pick

Career history
- Tennessee Titans (2001–2004); New Orleans Saints (2005)

Career NFL statistics
- Receptions: 42
- Receiving yards: 334
- Receiving touchdowns: 3
- Stats at Pro Football Reference

Shadley Benjamin Meier (born June 7, 1978) is an American former professional football player who was a tight end in the National Football League (NFL).

== Early life and college ==
Shad Meier prepped at Pittsburg High School, in his home town, where he was an All-State Top 11 Selection in Kansas in the fall of 1995 under legendary coach Larry Garman. He went on to enjoy a five-year playing career for the Kansas State Wildcats, where he was a two-year starter at tight end for Bill Snyder. He is one of the four Meier brothers to play college football. His younger brother Dylan (now deceased) also played for the Wildcats. The youngest brother Kerry played for the University of Kansas.

== Professional career ==
Shad Meier was selected as the 90th overall pick of the 2001 NFL draft for Tennessee Titans. The 6 foot 4 inches, 255 pounds, from Pittsburg, Kansas enjoyed a 6-year playing career in the NFL. He spent first four years of his NFL career with the Tennessee Titans. Meier was traded to the New Orleans Saints in 2004 before retiring in 2006.

== NFL career statistics ==
Legend
**Bold**	Career high

=== Regular season ===
Year	Team	Games		Receiving					
Year	Team	GP	GS	Tgt	Rec	Yds	Avg	Lng	TD
2001	TEN	11	1	5	3	31	10.3	18	0
2002	TEN	12	0	4	1	17	**17.0**	17	1
2003	TEN	**15**	**6**	19	13	**159**	12.2	27	0
2004	TEN	14	**6**	**36**	**25**	127	5.1	**29**	**2**
2005	TEN	1	0	0	0	0	0.0	0	0
Career		53	13	65	42	334	8.0	29	3

=== Playoffs ===
Year	Team	Games		Receiving					
Year	Team	GP	GS	Tgt	Rec	Yds	Avg	Lng	TD
2002	TEN	**2**	0	0	0	0	0.0	0	0
2003	TEN	**2**	0	**1**	0	0	0.0	0	0
Career		4	0	1	0	0	0.0	0	0

== Personal life ==
Meier is son of Dennis and Valerie Meier who reside in Pittsburg, Kansas. Meier is currently a Health/Wellness Teacher at Franklin High School in Franklin, Tennessee.
