= Pittsburg Area Community Transit and Gus Bus =

Providers of mass transportation in Crawford County, Kansas

- Locale: Pittsburg, Kansas
- Service area: Crawford County, Kansas
- Service type: Bus service, paratransit
- Routes: 3
- Fleet: 10 buses
- Annual ridership: 43,994 (2019)
- Website: Pittsburg Area Community Transit

Pittsburg Area Community Transit (PACT) and Gus Bus are the providers of mass transportation in Pittsburg, Kansas with three routes serving the region. They are a service of the Southeast Kansas Community Action Program (SEK-CAP). As of 2019, the system provided 43,994 rides over 16,932 annual vehicle revenue hours with 10 buses and 14 paratransit vehicles.

== History ==
Public transit in Pittsburg began with streetcars in 1890, with the Pittsburg Railway. Numerous different companies operated transit in the city in the ensuing decades, with streetcar service replaced by buses in 1933.

== Service ==
SEK-CAP operates three regular weekday bus routes in Pittsburg. Two of the routes are branded as PACT, while the Gus Bus is primarily intended for students of Pittsburg State University. The two PACT routes operate as one loop around the city.

Hours of operation for the system are Monday through Friday from 7:30 A.M. to 7:00 P.M. There is no service on Saturdays and Sundays. Neither service requires fares, and while students of PSU ride for free, the general public is encouraged to donate.

== Fixed route ridership ==
The ridership statistics shown here are of fixed route services only and do not include demand response services.

== See also ==
- List of bus transit systems in the United States
