= Kerry Meier =

American football player (born 1986)

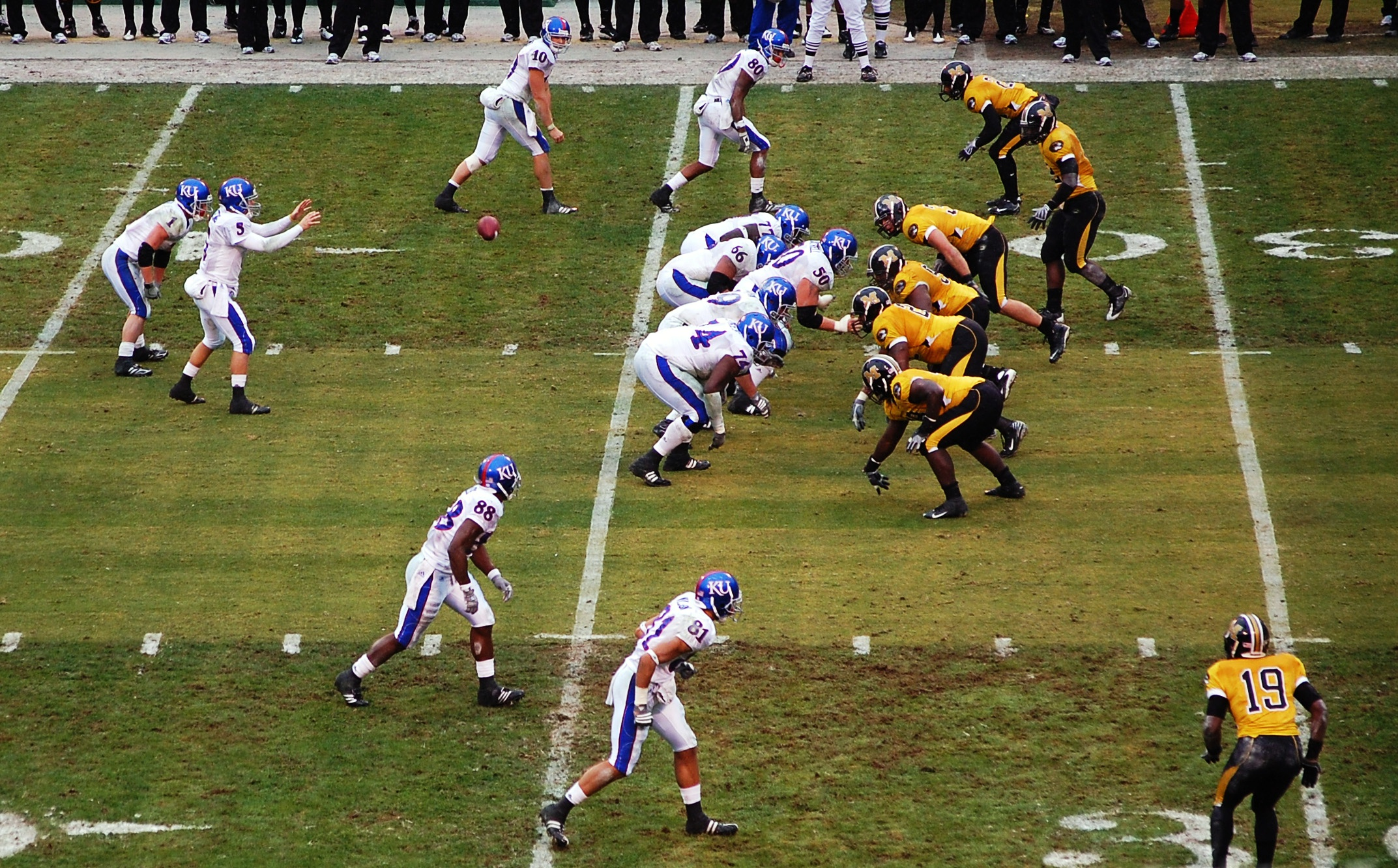
- Meier (top of the frame, number 10) lined up at wide receiver against Missouri in 2008

No. 80
- Position: Wide receiver

Personal information
- Born: November 12, 1986 (age 39); Pittsburg, Kansas, U.S.
- Listed height: 6 ft 2 in (1.88 m)
- Listed weight: 224 lb (102 kg)

Career information
- High school: Pittsburg
- College: Kansas
- NFL draft: 2010: 5th round, 165th overall pick

Career history
- Atlanta Falcons (2010–2012)

Awards and highlights
- Second-team All-Big 12 (2009)
- Stats at Pro Football Reference

Kerry Meier (born November 12, 1986) is an American former professional football player who was a wide receiver for the Atlanta Falcons of the National Football League (NFL). He played college football for the Kansas Jayhawks. A former quarterback turned wide receiver in college, he broke multiple Kansas receiving records and played a key role in the Jayhawks winning the 2008 Orange Bowl his sophomore year as well as helping lead the Jayhawks to win the 2008 Insight Bowl his junior year. He was selected by the Atlanta in the fifth round of the 2010 NFL draft.

== Early life ==
Kerry Meier was born and raised in Pittsburg, Kansas. He grew up playing many sports including football, basketball, and baseball. Meier attended Pittsburg High School where he was an all-state quarterback, kicker and punter. He was named all-league first-team as a quarterback and a punter in both 2003 and 2004. Additionally, he was an all-state selection at quarterback by the Kansas Football Coaches Association as a senior. He was also named to the KFCA's Top 11. He was ranked as the 13th-best high school senior quarterback in the nation by Superprep Magazine. During his senior season, Meier completed 72 of 151 passes for 930 yards and nine touchdowns in 2004. He led the PHS Dragons to the sectional championship as a junior and senior. Meier was coached in football by Merle Clark. Meier graduated in 2005 following a very successful high school career. Rivals.com ranked Meier the best high school player in Kansas and the 14th best dual threat quarterback. Meier committed to play collegiately for Mark Mangino's Kansas Jayhawks.

== College career ==
=== 2005 season ===
In fall of 2005 Meier underwent surgery for a heart condition that had been undetected until Meier started college. Meier was a redshirt this year. He was named as the co-winner of the team's Otto Schnellbacher Award, an award given to the offensive scout-team MVP.

=== 2006 season ===
During the 2006 season, Meier started eight games at quarterback. He completed 104 of 184 pass attempts and threw for 1,193 yards, including a KU freshman record 13 touchdowns. Meier also finished second on the team with 346 rushing yards. He averaged 3.5 yards per carry and added five rushing touchdowns. Meier was named KU's Offensive Player of the Week following the Northwestern State and OSU games.

=== 2007 season ===
Prior to the 2007 season, Meier lost the starting quarterback job to Todd Reesing, who would set Kansas single season records for passing yards and touchdowns. Despite losing his starting role, Meier found playing time at the wide receiver position. He caught 26 passes for 274 yards and completed 25 of 29 passes as the backup quarterback. He had at least two receptions in each of the last eight games. He also had four catches for 70 yards vs. Missouri and had four catches for 42 yards and a touchdown against Nebraska. Meier became the first KU player to record a rushing touchdown, passing touchdown and receiving touchdown in the same season since Garfield Taylor in 1981. He also became the first Jayhawk to record a rush, pass, reception and punt in the same season since Donald Shanklin in 1968. During this season, Meier was featured on the cover of Sports Illustrated.

=== 2008 season ===
In 2008, Meier was listed under four positions on the Kansas depth chart, backup quarterback, starting wide receiver, backup punter, and holder for kicks. He tied Dezmon Briscoe for the school mark for single-game receptions with 14 catches against Missouri. Meier had 97 catches for 1,045 yards, the fourth-most yards by a KU player in history. The 97 catches were a KU single-season record. He also had eight touchdown catches, which tied for third on the KU season list. Meier was also tied for sixth in the NCAA with 7.46 receptions per game. His 80.38 yards per game ranked 32nd nationally. Through the end of 2008, Meier had a streak of at least two passes in 21 consecutive games. Meier was a Biletnikoff Award candidate. He also earned All-Big 12 Honorable Mention honors. He was named Phil Steele All-Big 12 Third-team, Kansas City Star All-Big 12 Second-team, and Associated Press All-Big 12 Honorable Mention. Meier shared KU's Gale Sayers Most Courageous Player award with Jake Sharp, as well as KU's Most Improved Offensive Player with Dezmon Briscoe.

Meier graduated in 2010 with a degree in sports management.

== Professional career ==
Meier was selected 165th overall in the 2010 NFL Draft by the Atlanta Falcons. On July 16, 2010 Meier signed a 4-year, $1.947 million contract with the Falcons. He spent the entire 2010 season on injured reserve after injuring his knee in the 2nd preseason game against the New England Patriots. In what was officially Meier's rookie year in 2011, he played in 12 games, but did not record a single catch. He was placed on waivers in April 2013 after spending 2012 on injured reserve.

== Personal life ==
Meier has three older brothers all who played football. Shad Meier and Dylan Meier played for Kansas State University. Shad then spent six seasons in the National Football League. Adam Meier played at Pittsburg State.
