= Pittsburg USD 250 =

Public school district in Pittsburg, Kansas

Address
- 510 Deill St. Pittsburg, Kansas, 66762; United States
- Coordinates: 37.3860°N 94.6957°W

District information
- Type: Public
- Grades: K to 12

Other information
- Website: usd250.org

Pittsburg USD 250 is a public unified school district headquartered in Pittsburg, Kansas, United States. The district includes the communities of Pittsburg, Opolis, and nearby rural areas.

== Schools ==
The school district operates the following schools:

Secondary:

- Pittsburg High School
- Pittsburg Community Middle School

Primary:

- Lakeside Elementary School
- Meadowlark Elementary School
- George Nettels Elementary School
- Westside Elementary School

== See also ==
- Kansas State Department of Education
- Kansas State High School Activities Association
- List of high schools in Kansas
- List of unified school districts in Kansas
