= Pittsburg High School (Kansas) =

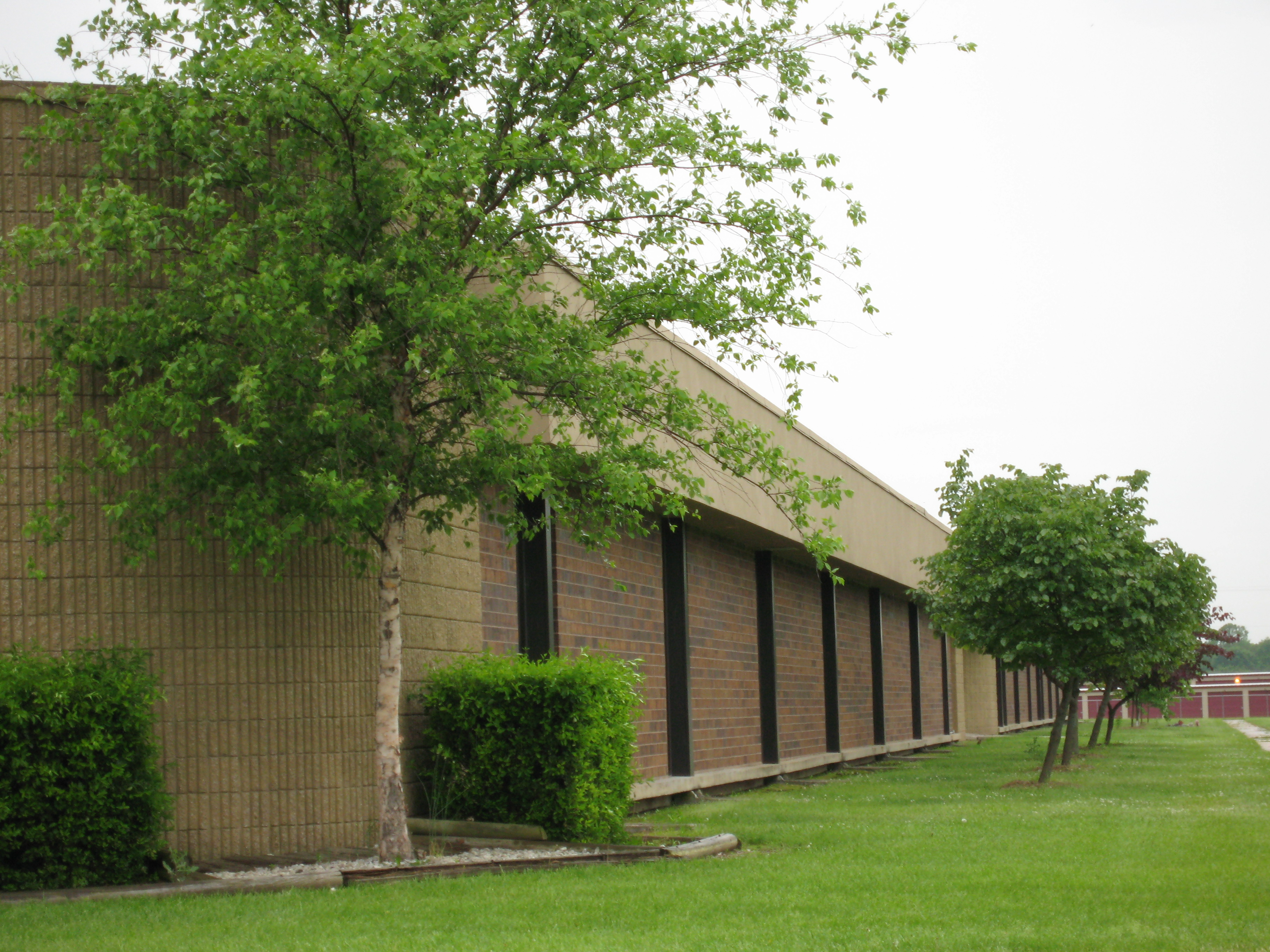
- Pittsburg High School (2007)

Location
- 1978 East 4th Street; Pittsburg, Kansas 66762; United States; 37.409280°N 94.672469°W

Information
- School type: Public, High School
- Established: 1887
- School board: Board Website
- School district: Pittsburg USD 250
- CEEB code: 172407
- Principal: Kelynn K. Heardt
- Teaching staff: 59.25 (FTE)
- Grades: 9 to 12
- Gender: coed
- Enrollment: 1,044 (2023-2024)
- Student to teacher ratio: 17.62
- Campus type: Rural
- Colors: Purple; White
- Athletics: Class 5A; District 4
- Athletics conference: Southeast Kansas League
- Mascot: Purple Dragons
- Rival: Fort Scott High School
- Newspaper: The Booster Redux
- Website: phs.usd250.org

Pittsburg High School is a fully accredited public high school located in Pittsburg, Kansas, United States, serving students in grades 9–12. The school is part of Pittsburg USD 250 public school district, is one of the schools in Pittsburg and is the largest high school in southeast Kansas. The school colors are purple and white and the school mascot is the Dragon.

== History ==
Pittsburg High School was established in 1887, making it one of the oldest high schools in the state of Kansas. Pittsburg High is a member of the Kansas State High School Activities Association and offers a variety of sports programs. Athletic teams compete in the 5A division and are known as the "Dragons".

On March 6, 2017, the school district hired Amy Robertson as Pittsburg High School's principal. In preparing a feature introducing Robertson to the school community, the staff of the student newspaper were unable to find evidence that Robertson's university, Corllins University, was accredited. The student newspaper published an article questioning Robertson's credentials on March 31, 2017; on April 4, 2017, Robertson resigned.

== Extracurricular activities ==
=== Non-athletic programs ===
==== Student newspaper ====
The Booster Redux made national news in April 2017 after student editors published an investigative story on the qualifications of a newly hired principal. The principal resigned shortly thereafter.

==== Scholars Bowl ====
Pittsburg High School has won two state scholars bowl championships, in 2005 and 2007.

==== Forensics ====
State Championships
Type	Number of Championships	Year
Humorous Interpretation	1	2008
Extemporaneous Speaking	3	2000, 2008, 2019
Total	4	

=== Theatre ===
In 2010, Pittsburg High School's fall play, Crimes of the Heart, tied for first place in a statewide theatre competition. The show was performed at the Kansas State Thespian Conference in January 2011. In 2018, their musical "Urinetown" was performed at both the Kansas State Thespian Festival in January 2018 and the International Thespian Festival in June 2018. In 2020, Pittsburg High School's Musical Repertory Theatre musical "Pippin", performed at the Kansas State Thespian Festival in January 2020.

In October 2021, Pittsburg High School was honored with the "Best Performing Arts High School in Kansas" award by the KSHSAA. This award was given based on excellence in theatre, drama, debate, vocal music, instrumental music, and technical direction. Pittsburg High is widely acclaimed across the state of Kansas for its excellence in theatre and performing arts, with various awards and honors received in past years.

=== Athletics ===
Pittsburg High School offers many different sports and extracurricular programs for its students. Some of the programs include: football, basketball (men's and women's), volleyball, soccer, softball, baseball, wrestling, dance team, and cheer-leading. The Purple Dragons are classified as a 5A school according to the Kansas State High School Activities Association. Additionally, the Purple Dragons have won multiple district and state championships in both athletic and non-athletic programs.

==== Track and Field ====
Track and Field was established at Pittsburg High shortly after the school was founded. Throughout the years, many students have won individual state titles and have set numerous school records.

==== Wrestling ====
Wrestling is a sport offered at Pittsburg High. In 2007, Tyler Koehn won the state title in the 152 lb division. Beau Bennett won the Class 5A state championship at 285 pounds in 2009. Broc Bennett won the 4A 285 pound state title in 2011.

=== State championships ===
State Championships
Season	Sport	Number of Championships	Year
Fall	Football	4	1954, 1983, 1988, 1990
Total		4	

== National awards ==
- National Champions, 2000 NASA Great Moonbuggy Race, High School Division

== Notable alumni ==
- Brad Franchione (1992), college football coach
- Hugh Gillin (1943), actor
- Dylan Meier (2002), former Kansas State quarterback
- Kerry Meier (2005), former NFL wide receiver for the Atlanta Falcons, former quarterback/slotback for the University of Kansas
- Shad Meier (1996), retired NFL tight end who played for the Tennessee Titans and New Orleans Saints
- Russ Pennell (1979), head men's basketball coach at Grand Canyon University
- Bill Russell (1966), former shortstop, coach, and manager for the Los Angeles Dodgers
- Gary Zukav (1960), New York Times bestselling author and frequent guest on The Oprah Winfrey Show

== Gallery ==
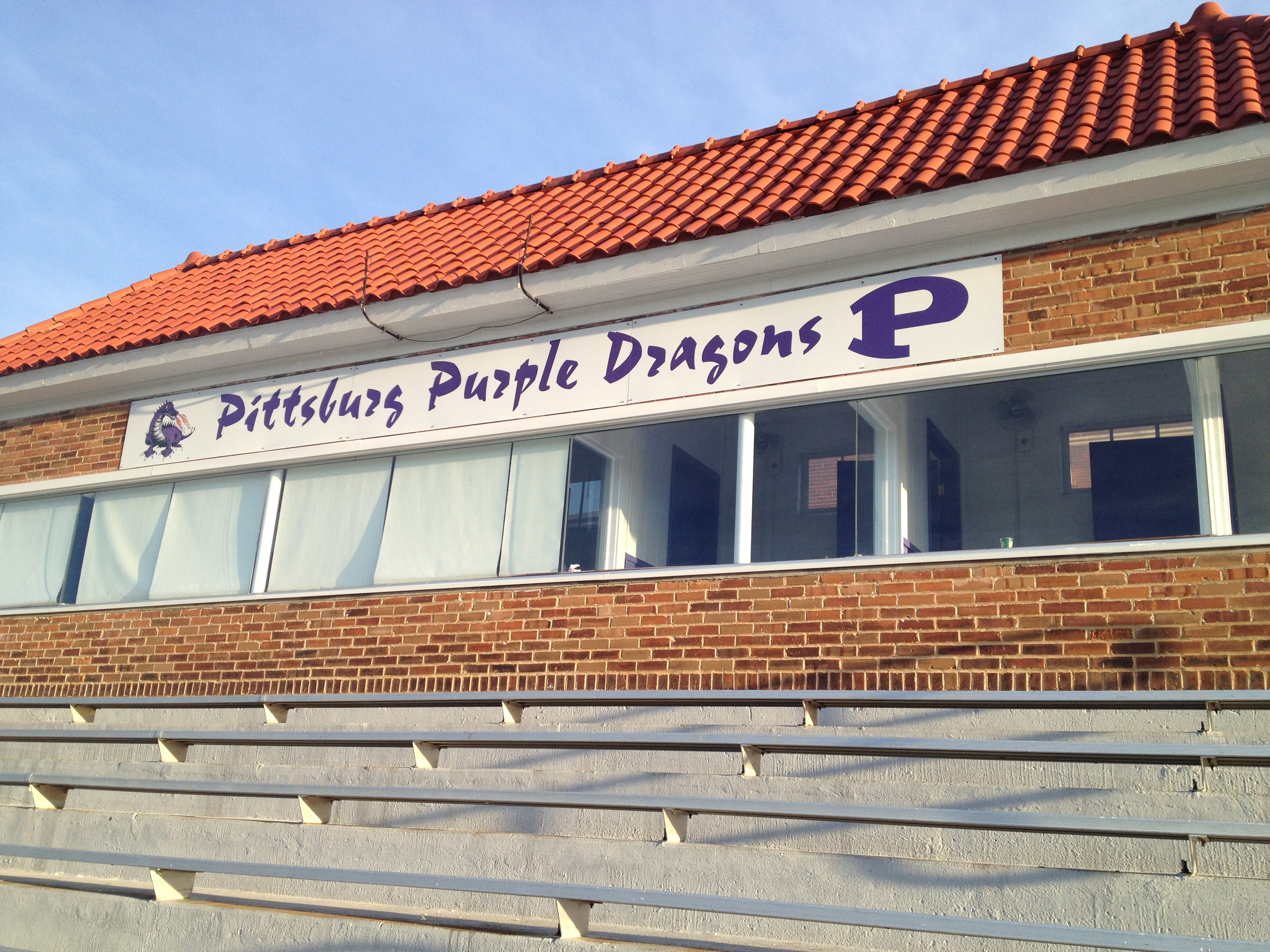
Hutchinson Field

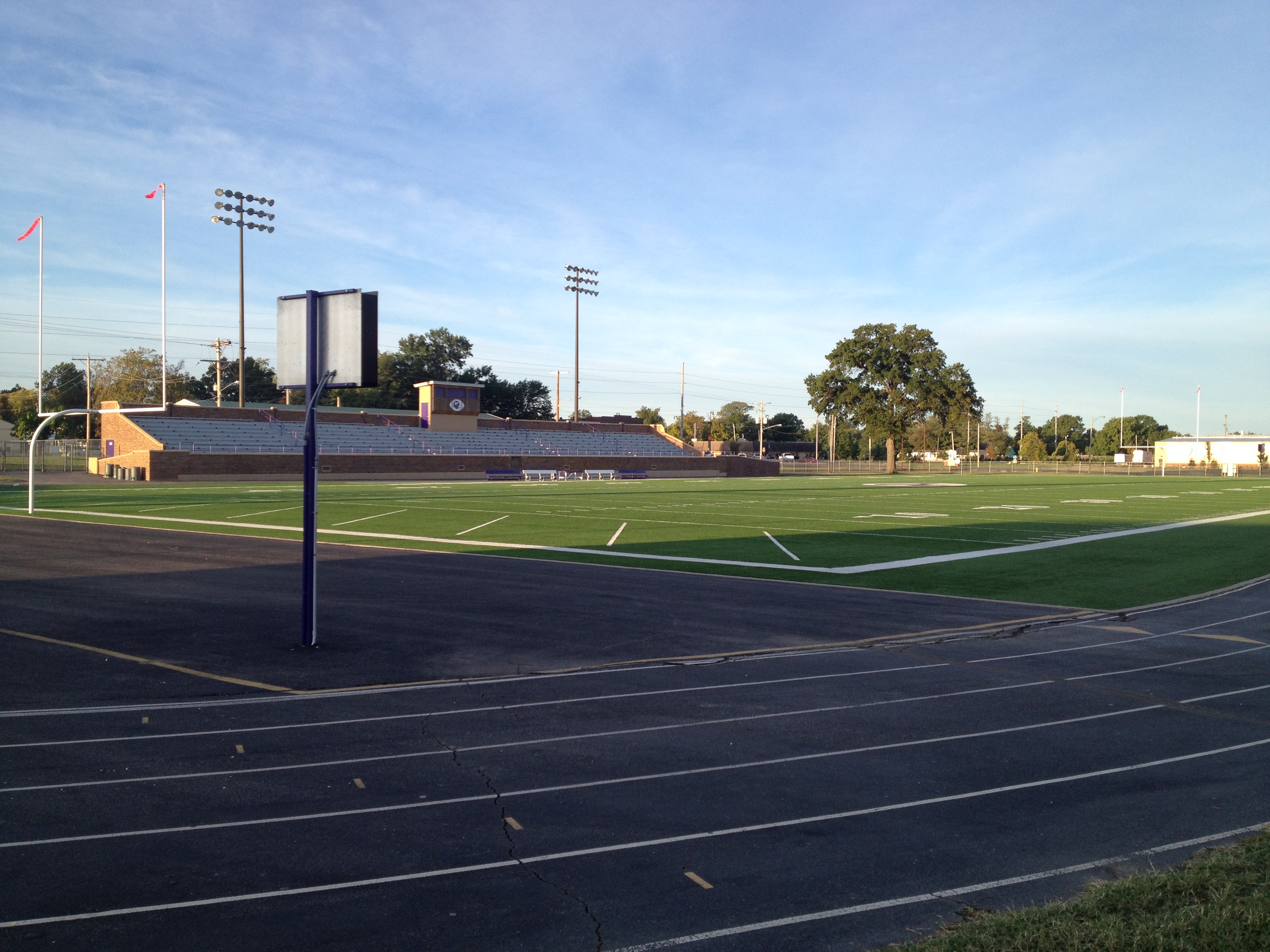
Hutchinson Field

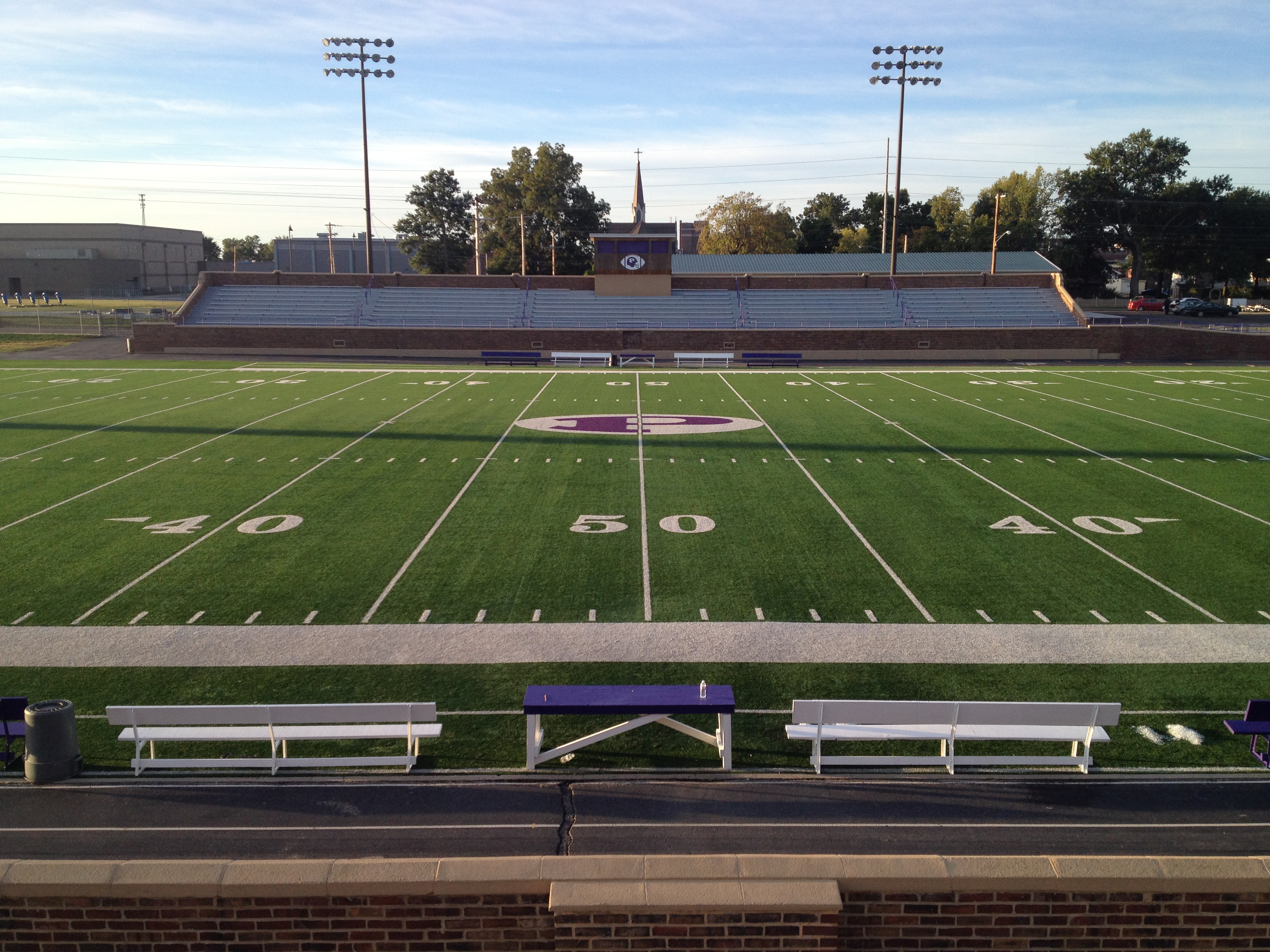
Hutchinson Field

== See also ==
- List of high schools in Kansas
- List of unified school districts in Kansas
