= Pittsburg, Kansas =

City in Crawford County, Kansas

- City
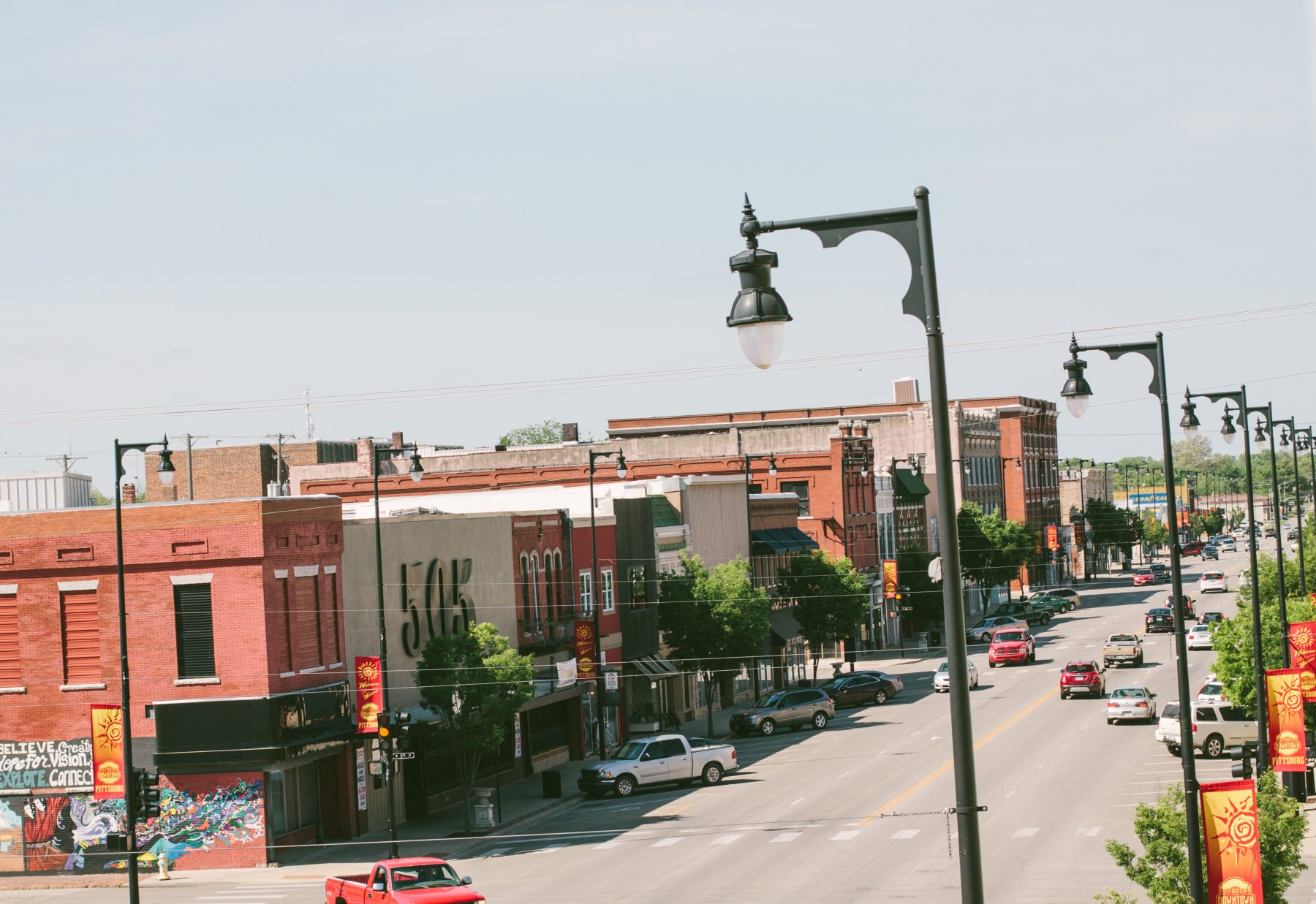
- View of downtown Pittsburg (2017)

- Location within Crawford County and Kansas

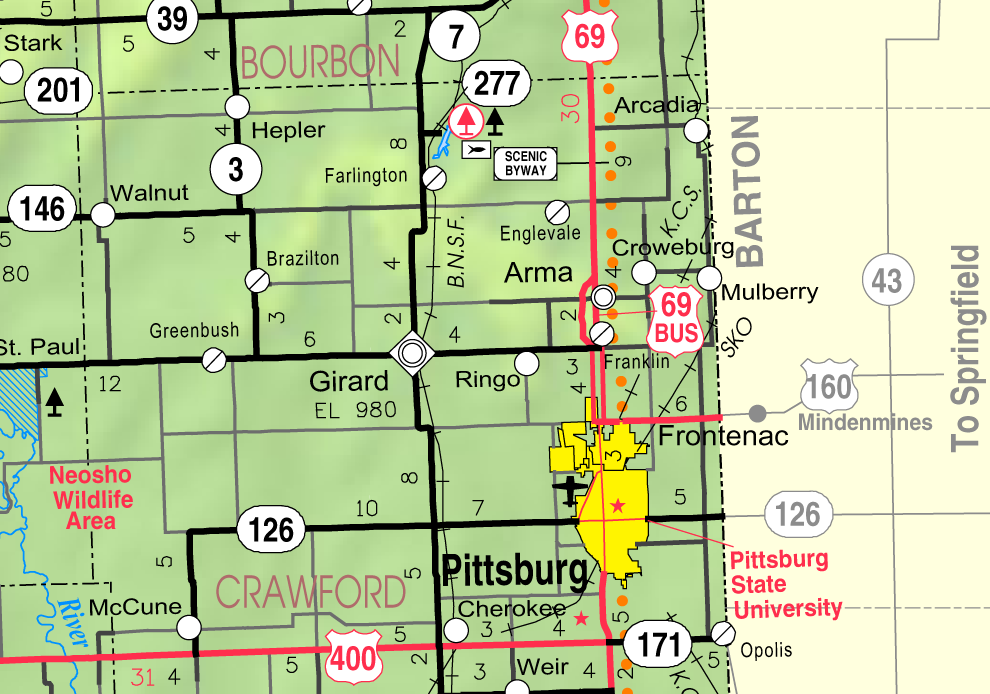
- KDOT map of Crawford County (legend)
- Coordinates: 37°24′39″N 94°41′54″W
- Country: United States
- State: Kansas
- County: Crawford
- Founded: 1876
- Incorporated: 1880
- Named for: Pittsburgh

Government
  - Type: Commission/Manager
  - Mayor: Dawn McNay
  - City Manager: Daron Hall

Area
  - Total: 13.16 sq mi (34.09 km^{2})
  - Land: 13.07 sq mi (33.84 km^{2})
  - Water: 0.097 sq mi (0.25 km^{2})
- Elevation: 925 ft (282 m)

Population (2020)
  - Total: 20,646
  - Density: 1,580/sq mi (610.1/km^{2})
- Time zone: UTC−6 (CST)
  - Summer (DST): UTC−5 (CDT)
- ZIP Code: 66762
- Area code: 620
- FIPS code: 20-56025
- GNIS ID: 485643
- Website: pittks.org

Pittsburg is a city in Crawford County, Kansas, United States, located in southeast Kansas near the Missouri state border. It is the most populous city in Crawford County and southeast Kansas. As of the 2020 census, the population of the city was 20,646. It is the home of Pittsburg State University.

== History ==
On October 23, 1864, a wagon train of refugees had come from Fort Smith, Arkansas, and was escorted by troops from the 6th Kansas Cavalry under the command of Col. William Campbell. These were local men from Cherokee, Crawford, and Bourbon counties. Their enlistment was over, and they were on their way to Fort Leavenworth to be dismissed from service. They ran into the 1st Indian Brigade led by Maj. Andrew Jackson Piercy near the current Pittsburg Waste Water Treatment Plant. They continued to the north when a small group of wagons broke away in an unsuccessful rush to safety. The Confederate troops caught up with them and burned the wagons. The death toll was three Union soldiers and 13 civilian men who had been with the wagon train. It was likely that one of the Confederates had also been killed. A granite marker memorial for the "Cow Creek Skirmish" was placed near the Crawford County Historical Museum on October 30, 2011.

Pittsburg sprang up in the fall of 1876 on a railroad line being built through the neighborhood. It was named after Pittsburgh, Pennsylvania, and maps of the time give the town's name as "New Pittsburgh". George Hobson and Franklin Playter are credited with being the city's founders, establishing a government after its beginnings as a coal mining camp in the 1870s. The city was incorporated in 1879. The "New" was dropped upon incorporation of the city as a third class city on June 21, 1880, with M. M. Snow as its first Mayor. In 1892 it was advanced to a city of the second class, in 1905 Pittsburg attained the rank of first class.

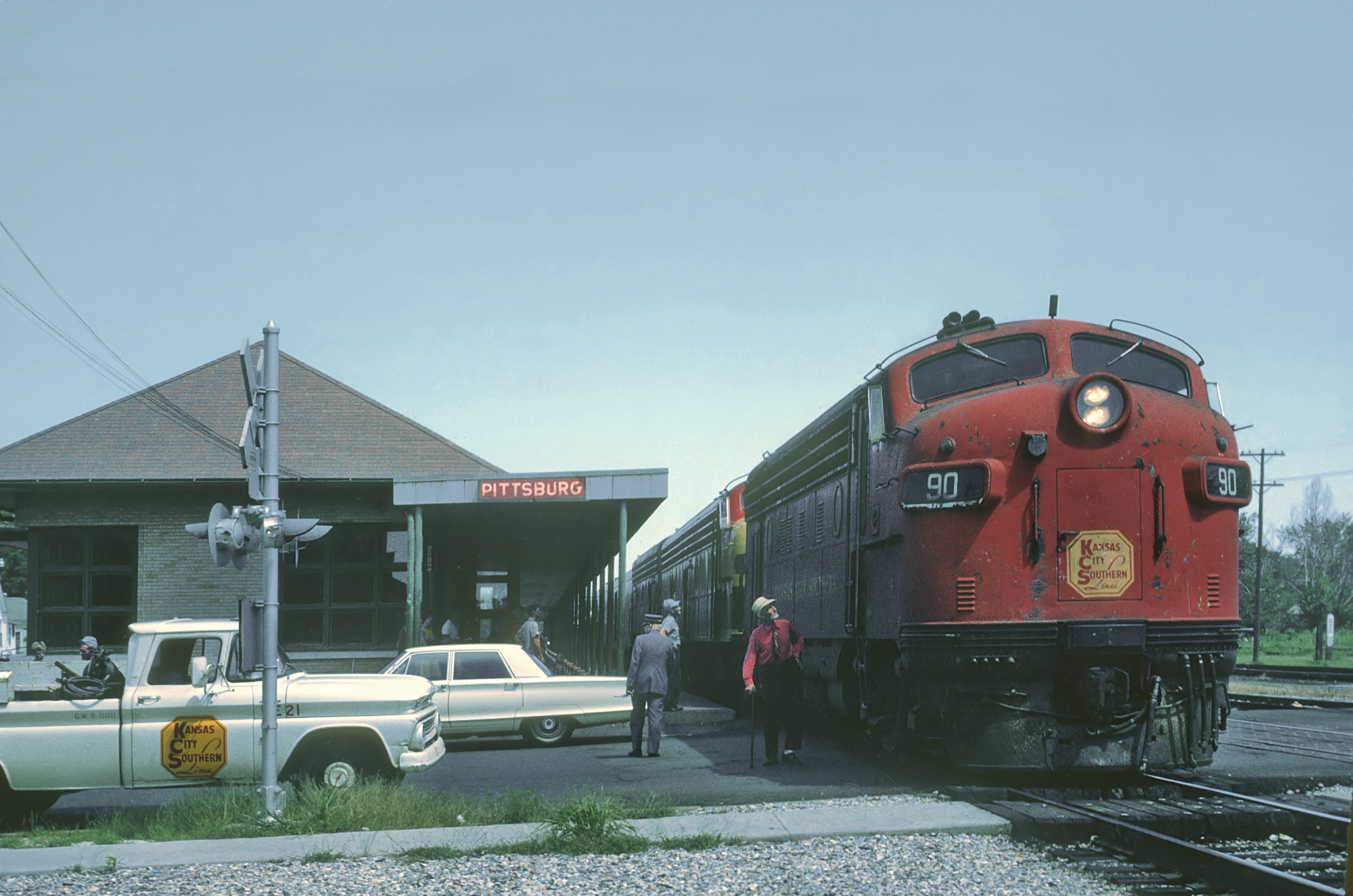
The Kansas City Southern's Southern Belle at Pittsburg in 1967

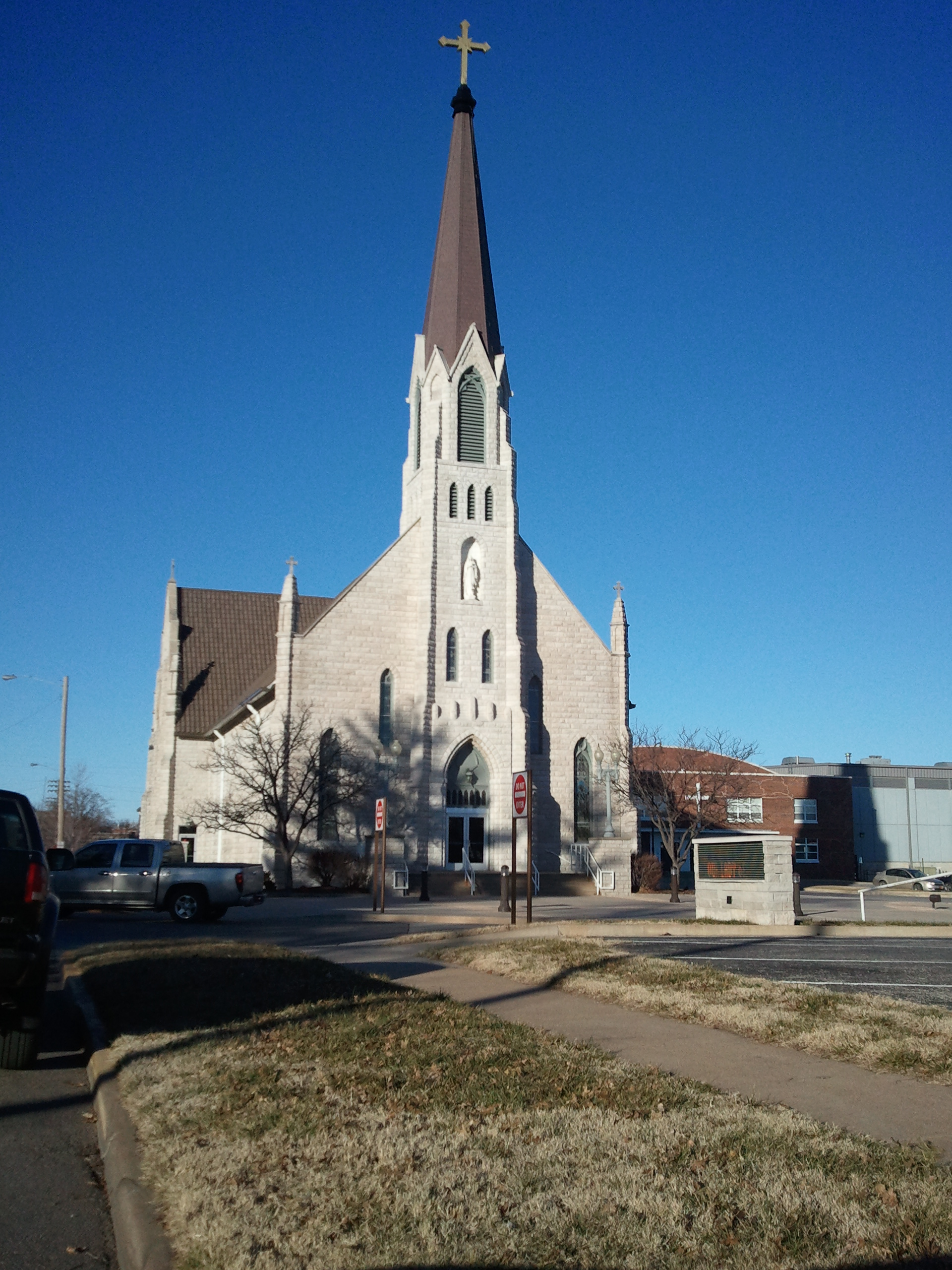
Our Lady of Lourdes Catholic Church (2012)

The first dwelling was built by J. T. Roach in July 1876. The first post office in Pittsburg was established in August, 1876. The post office's name was shortened from "New Pittsburgh" to "Pittsburgh" in 1881 and to "Pittsburg" in 1894. The latter renaming came after the United States Board on Geographic Names, in the interest of standardization, recommended that the 'h' be dropped from place names ending in "burgh".

Pittsburg is the home to Pittsburg State University, founded in 1903 as a normal training institution. Through the years the college became more diversified in its aims and goals, so that it became a multi-purpose institution. It has always had a strong manual and industrial arts program and has trained many of the area's public and private school teachers.

In 1879, two miners from Joplin began the first commercial attempts at mining in close proximity of Broadway Street. A relic of the city's coal mining days was the Pittsburg & Midway Coal Company, founded in 1885, and one of the oldest continuously running coal companies in the United States (even though its headquarters moved several years ago to Denver, Colorado after the Kansas mines closed). In September 2007, Chevron which owned the company, merged it with its Molycorp Inc. coal mining division to form Chevron Mining, thus ending the Pittsburg corporate name. Midway referred to a coal camp in eastern Crawford County, Kansas that was "midway" between Baxter Springs, Kansas and Fort Scott, Kansas. Kenneth A. Spencer, whose father was among the founders of the company was to play an important role in Kansas and Missouri philanthropy.

Pittsburg was also the most heavily unionized city in Kansas at the beginning of the 20th century. In addition to some coal mining, the economic base of the city now rests on industry.

The city has a rich cultural heritage from many Southern and Eastern European mine workers who settled in and around Pittsburg and Southeastern Kansas. It is situated in a once productive coal field. It now relies heavily on education and government-related employment.

== Geography ==
According to the United States Census Bureau, the city has a total area of 12.90 square miles (33.41 km^{2}), of which 12.80 square miles (33.15 km^{2}) is land and 0.10 square miles (0.26 km^{2}) is water. Pittsburg sits in the Ozark Highlands region, a mix of prairie and forests.

It lies 90 miles (140 km) west of Springfield, Missouri, 124 miles (200 km) south of Kansas City, Missouri, and 137 miles (220 km) northeast of Tulsa, Oklahoma.

=== Climate ===
Pittsburg has a humid subtropical climate (Köppen Cfa) bordering on a hot-summer humid continental climate (Dfa). Summers are hot and humid, with as many as 73 mornings per year staying above 68 °F or 20 °C and eight mornings remaining above 77 °F or 25 °C – indeed in July 2012 the temperature did not fall below 69 °F or 20.6 °C.

Climate data for Pittsburg, Kansas (1991–2020 normals, extremes 1950–present)
Month	Jan	Feb	Mar	Apr	May	Jun	Jul	Aug	Sep	Oct	Nov	Dec	Year
Record high °F (°C)	74 (23)	82 (28)	87 (31)	94 (34)	94 (34)	105 (41)	115 (46)	109 (43)	106 (41)	96 (36)	83 (28)	75 (24)	115 (46)
Mean daily maximum °F (°C)	42.7 (5.9)	48.3 (9.1)	58.7 (14.8)	68.0 (20.0)	76.4 (24.7)	85.5 (29.7)	90.2 (32.3)	89.8 (32.1)	82.2 (27.9)	70.0 (21.1)	57.2 (14.0)	46.0 (7.8)	67.9 (19.9)
Daily mean °F (°C)	33.2 (0.7)	38.2 (3.4)	47.7 (8.7)	57.0 (13.9)	66.0 (18.9)	75.4 (24.1)	80.1 (26.7)	78.9 (26.1)	70.9 (21.6)	58.8 (14.9)	46.4 (8.0)	36.8 (2.7)	57.4 (14.1)
Mean daily minimum °F (°C)	23.8 (−4.6)	28.2 (−2.1)	36.7 (2.6)	46.0 (7.8)	55.6 (13.1)	65.2 (18.4)	70.1 (21.2)	67.9 (19.9)	59.7 (15.4)	47.7 (8.7)	35.6 (2.0)	27.5 (−2.5)	47.0 (8.3)
Record low °F (°C)	−6 (−21)	−12 (−24)	2 (−17)	20 (−7)	32 (0)	47 (8)	52 (11)	46 (8)	38 (3)	20 (−7)	9 (−13)	−3 (−19)	−12 (−24)
Average precipitation inches (mm)	1.77 (45)	2.10 (53)	3.24 (82)	5.06 (129)	7.13 (181)	6.07 (154)	4.50 (114)	3.64 (92)	5.18 (132)	3.61 (92)	3.29 (84)	2.30 (58)	47.89 (1,216)
Average snowfall inches (cm)	3.4 (8.6)	1.0 (2.5)	1.6 (4.1)	0.0 (0.0)	0.0 (0.0)	0.0 (0.0)	0.0 (0.0)	0.0 (0.0)	0.0 (0.0)	0.0 (0.0)	0.6 (1.5)	2.9 (7.4)	9.5 (24)
Average precipitation days (≥ 0.01 in)	7.4	7.2	9.8	10.6	12.1	10.1	8.6	7.5	7.6	8.1	7.7	7.5	104.2
Average snowy days (≥ 0.1 in)	2.2	1.2	0.7	0.0	0.0	0.0	0.0	0.0	0.0	0.0	0.3	1.5	5.9
Source: NOAA

== Demographics ==
Historical population
Census	Pop.	Note	%±
1880	624		—
1890	6,697		973.2%
1900	10,112		51.0%
1910	14,755		45.9%
1920	18,052		22.3%
1930	18,145		0.5%
1940	17,571		−3.2%
1950	19,341		10.1%
1960	18,678		−3.4%
1970	20,171		8.0%
1980	18,770		−6.9%
1990	17,775		−5.3%
2000	19,243		8.3%
2010	20,233		5.1%
2020	20,646		2.0%
2023 (est.)	20,504		−0.7%
U.S. Decennial Census; 2010-2020

=== 2020 census ===
As of the 2020 census, Pittsburg had a population of 20,646, with 8,268 households and 4,123 families. The population density was 1,578.9 per square mile (609.6/km^{2}). There were 9,650 housing units at an average density of 738.0 per square mile (284.9/km^{2}), of which 14.3% were vacant; the homeowner vacancy rate was 3.3% and the rental vacancy rate was 12.0%. 97.4% of residents lived in urban areas, while 2.6% lived in rural areas.

The median age was 27.7 years. 21.9% of residents were under the age of 18; 23.9% were from 18 to 24; 23.7% were from 25 to 44; 17.8% were from 45 to 64; and 12.6% were 65 years of age or older. For every 100 females there were 99.7 males, and for every 100 females age 18 and over there were 96.8 males.

Of the 8,268 households, 27.1% had children under the age of 18 living in them. Of all households, 31.1% were married-couple households, 26.5% were households with a male householder and no spouse or partner present, and 32.9% were households with a female householder and no spouse or partner present. About 36.4% of all households were made up of individuals and 11.0% had someone living alone who was 65 years of age or older. The average household size was 2.3 and the average family size was 3.0.

The racial composition was as follows.

Racial composition as of the 2020 census
Race	Number	Percent
White	15,954	77.3%
Black or African American	773	3.7%
American Indian and Alaska Native	221	1.1%
Asian	367	1.8%
Native Hawaiian and Other Pacific Islander	156	0.8%
Some other race	1,110	5.4%
Two or more races	2,065	10.0%
Hispanic or Latino (of any race)	2,174	10.5%

=== 2016–2020 ACS estimates ===
The 2016–2020 5-year American Community Survey estimates show that the median household income was $34,353 (with a margin of error of +/- $3,233) and the median family income was $45,946 (+/- $5,025). Males had a median income of $20,107 (+/- $2,989) versus $17,708 (+/- $3,426) for females. The median income for those above 16 years old was $19,176 (+/- $2,042). Approximately, 18.6% of families and 27.5% of the population were below the poverty line, including 30.9% of those under the age of 18 and 8.8% of those ages 65 or over. The median value of owner-occupied housing units was $86,800. The percent of persons age 25 years or older with a high school diploma was 90.8%.

=== 2010 census ===
As of the census of 2010, there were 20,233 people, 8,142 households, and 4,087 families residing in the city. The population density was 1,580.7 inhabitants per square mile (610.3/km^{2}). There were 9,210 housing units at an average density of 719.5 per square mile (277.8/km^{2}). The racial makeup of the city was 87.1% White, 3.3% African American, 0.9% Native American, 2.0% Asian, 0.3% Pacific Islander, 3.0% from other races, and 3.4% from two or more races. Hispanic or Latino of any race were 6.7% of the population.

There were 8,142 households out of which 24.6% had children under the age of 18 living with them, 33.3% were married couples living together, 12.2% had a female householder with no husband present, 4.8% had a male householder with no wife present, and 49.8% were non-families. 32.8% of all households were made up of individuals and 10.8% had someone living alone who was 65 years of age or older. The average household size was 2.31 and the average family size was 2.97.

The median age in the city was 26.2 years. 20.7% of residents were under the age of 18; 27% were between the ages of 18 and 24; 23.3% were from 25 to 44; 17.3% were from 45 to 64; and 11.7% were 65 years of age or older. The gender makeup of the city was 49.9% male and 50.1% female.

== Arts and culture ==
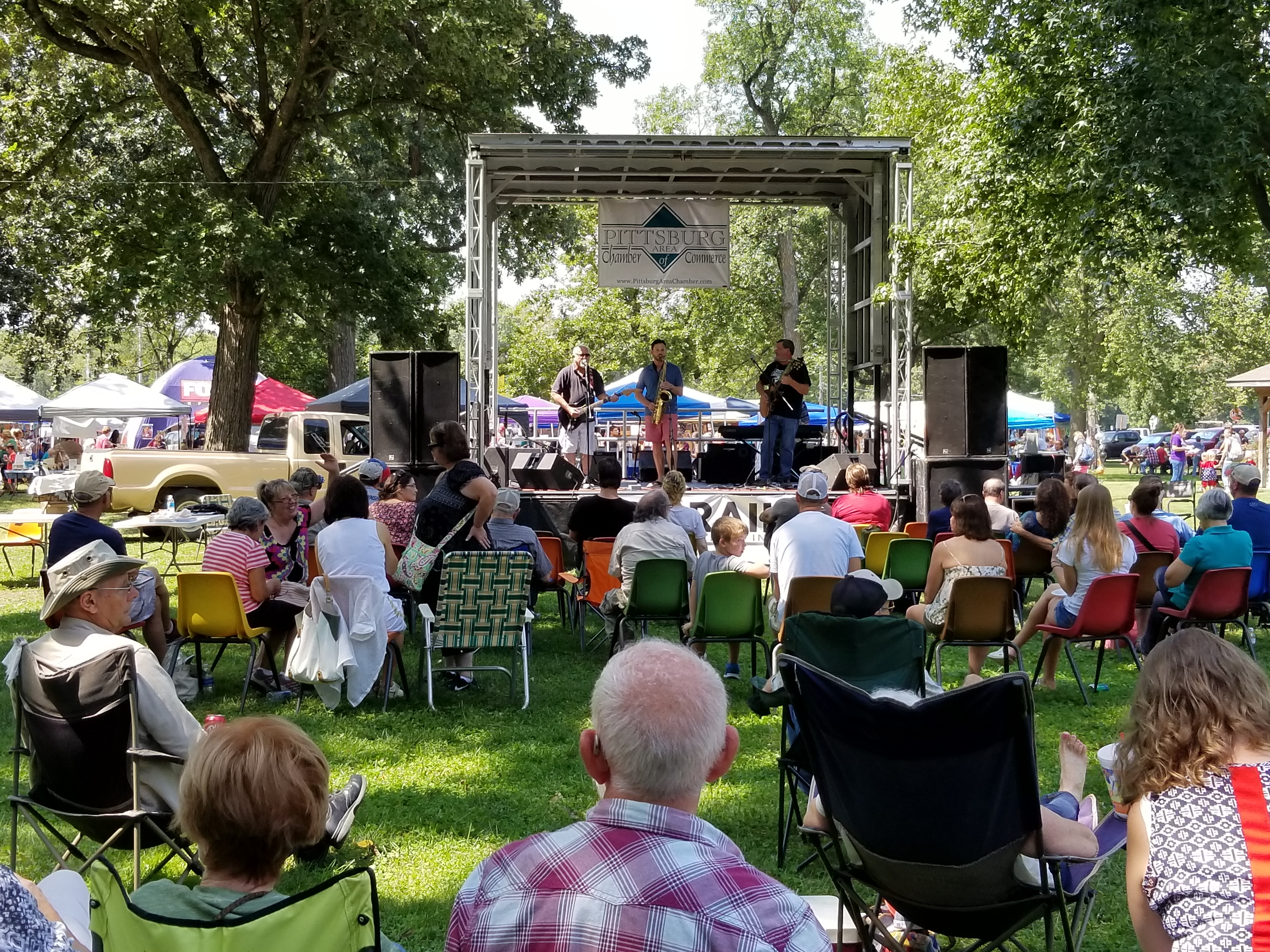
Little Balkans Days (2018)

=== Events ===
Little Balkans Days is a three-day festival celebrating the community's European ethnic heritage, held on the Labor Day weekend. It features games, entertainment, competitions, and arts and crafts. The Pittsburg Art Walk takes features vendors, artists, and musicians; it occurs multiple times per year on Broadway Street in Pittsburg's downtown district. In 2025 Little Balkans Days board disbanded, leaving the City of Pittsburg to take the event over.

=== Points of interest ===
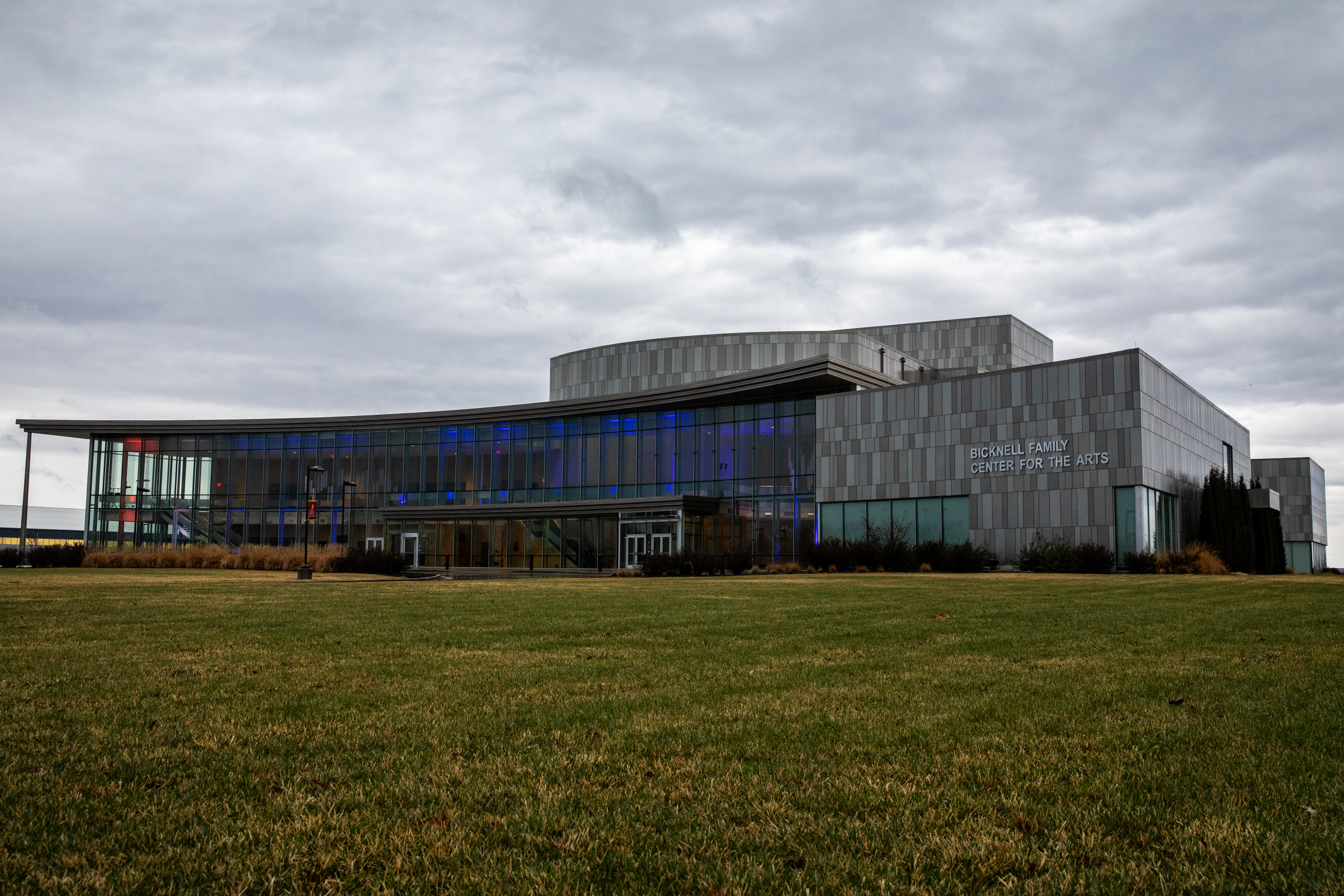
Bicknell Family Center for the Arts

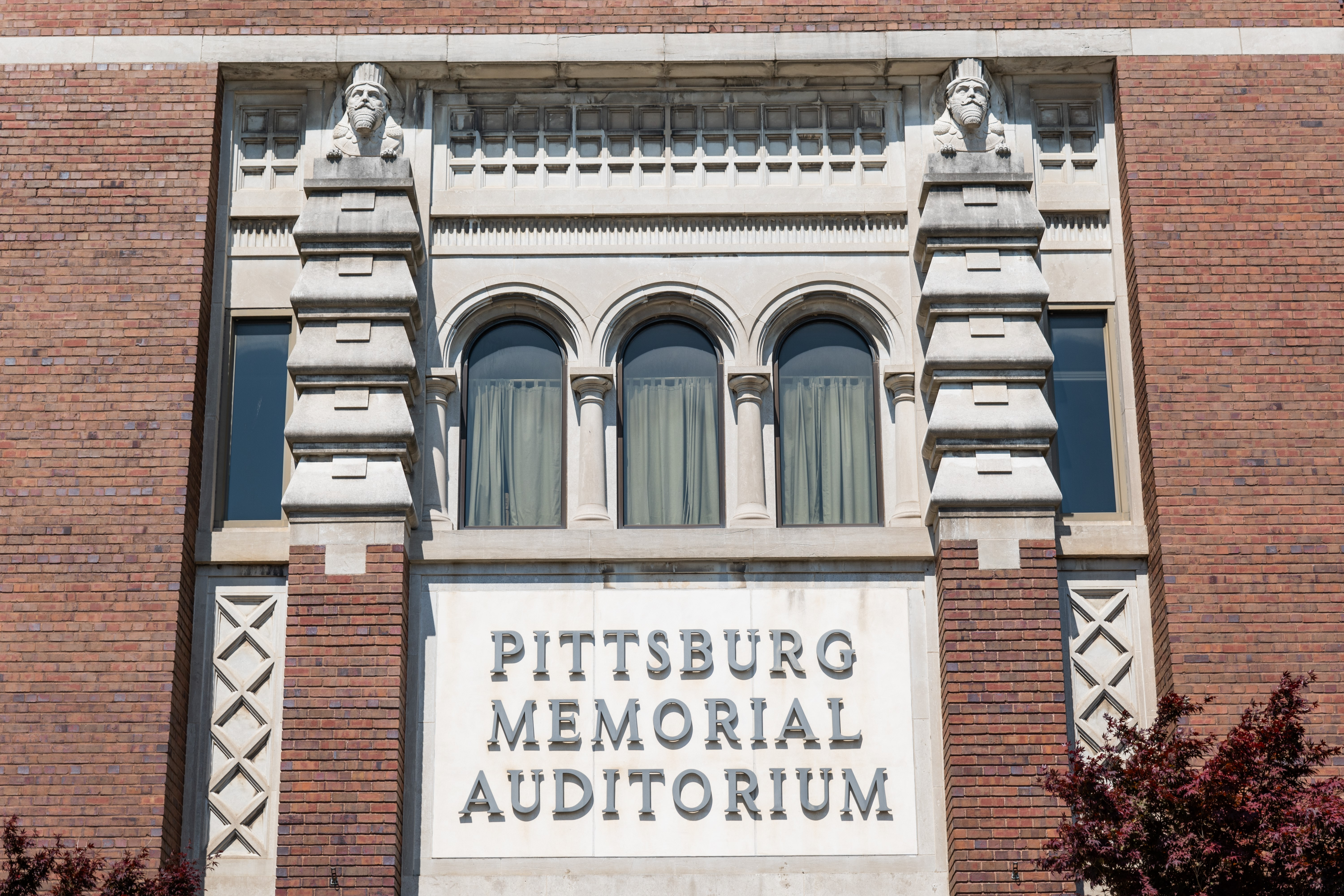
The Front Sign of the Memorial Auditorium (2020)

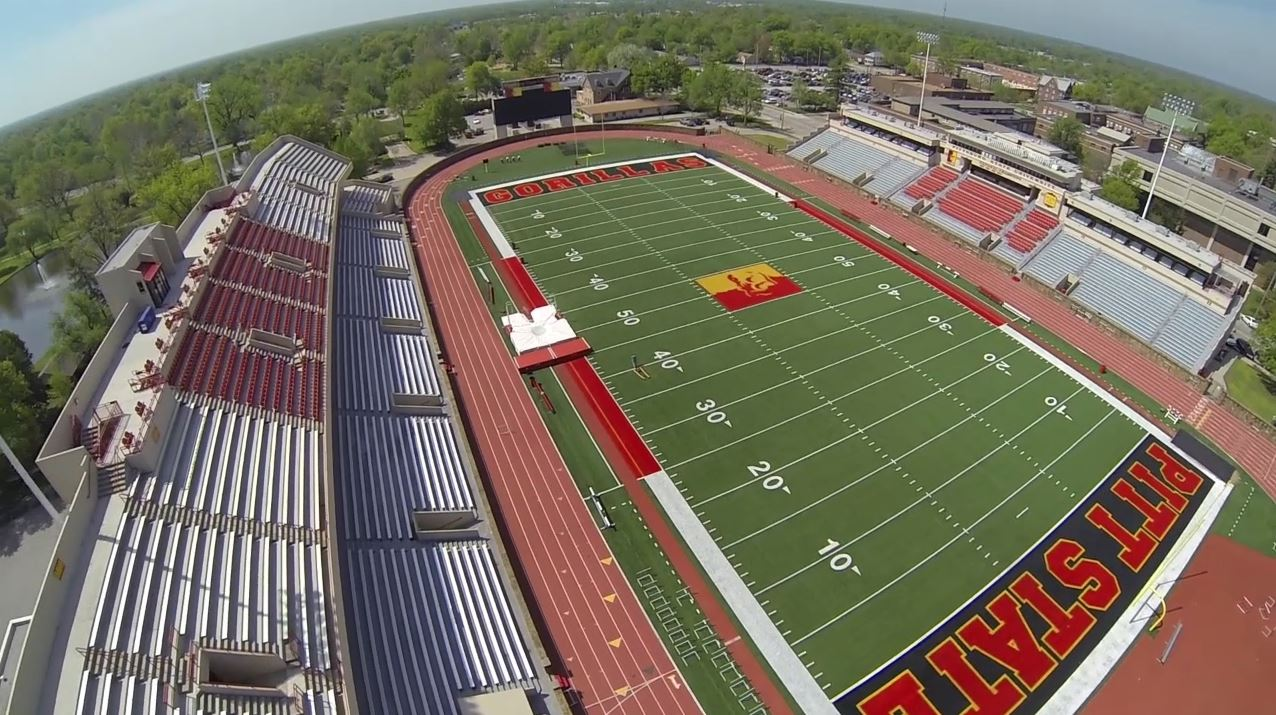
Aerial view on Carnie Smith Stadium (2013)

- The Bicknell Family Center for the Arts houses multiple performance halls.
- Memorial Auditorium opened in 1925, and features Egyptian Revival Style architecture. It hosts concerts and performances.
- Pittsburg Aquatic Center is a community swimming pool.
- Carnie Smith Stadium is a Classical Revival style stadium opened in 1924, and is Pittsburg State University's home football field and outdoor track facility.
- Jaycee Ballpark.
- Veteran's Memorial features a 250-seat amphitheater, a Vietnam Veteran's Memorial Wall replica, a reflecting pool, and plaza with over 2,000 engraved paving stones.
- Robert W. Plaster Center is a track-and-field facility.
- Block 22 is a commercial district.
- Crawford County Historical Museum and Green Elm School.
- Miners' Memorial and Immigrant Park.
- Kansas Crossing Casino

=== Library ===
- Pittsburg Public Library
- Leonard H. Axe Library at Pittsburg State University

== Parks and recreation ==
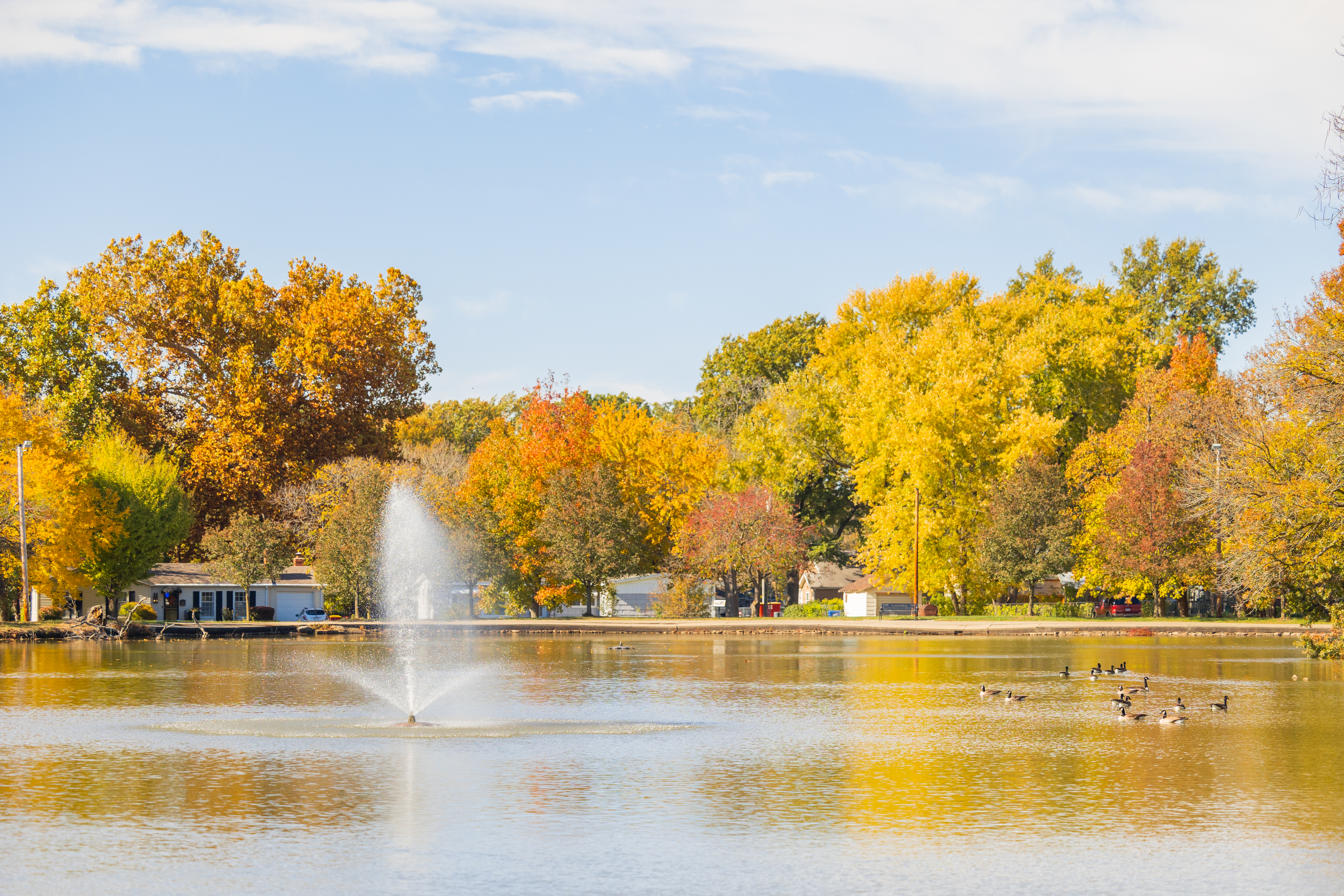
Lakeside Fountain

Pittsburg hosts a multitude of parks inside its city limits

- 23rd Street Bike Park - single track mountain biking park, a skills area, pump track, and dirt jump area
- Countryside Park - playground and pavilion
- Deramus Park - basketball court, playground, small sports field
- Europe Park - unique water features and a seating area
- Kiwanis Park - playground and pavilion
- Lakeside Park - lake, accessible fishing dock and parking area, playground, two pavilions, tennis courts
- Lincoln Park - J.J. Richards Band Dome, Kiddieland Amusement Park, Pittsburg Aquatic Center, Don Gutteridge Sports Complex, two bocce courts, nine-hole disc, golf course, fishing, playground, restrooms, and three pavilions
- Paul B. Leffler Rotary Park - basketball court, grill, playground, and a small sports fields
- Schlanger Park - Katherine's playground (ADA accessible), Ronald O. Thomas Dog Park, basketball court, pickleball court, sensory garden, two pavilions, skate park, sand volleyball, 18-hole disc golf course, and a splashpad
- Sunflower Kiwanis Park - playground and pavilion
- Trail Head Park/Watco Trail - pergola, benches, 1.5-mile paved walking and biking trail
- Wilderness Park - four miles of trail and four pits for fishing. (Most of the trail is ADA accessible)

== Government ==
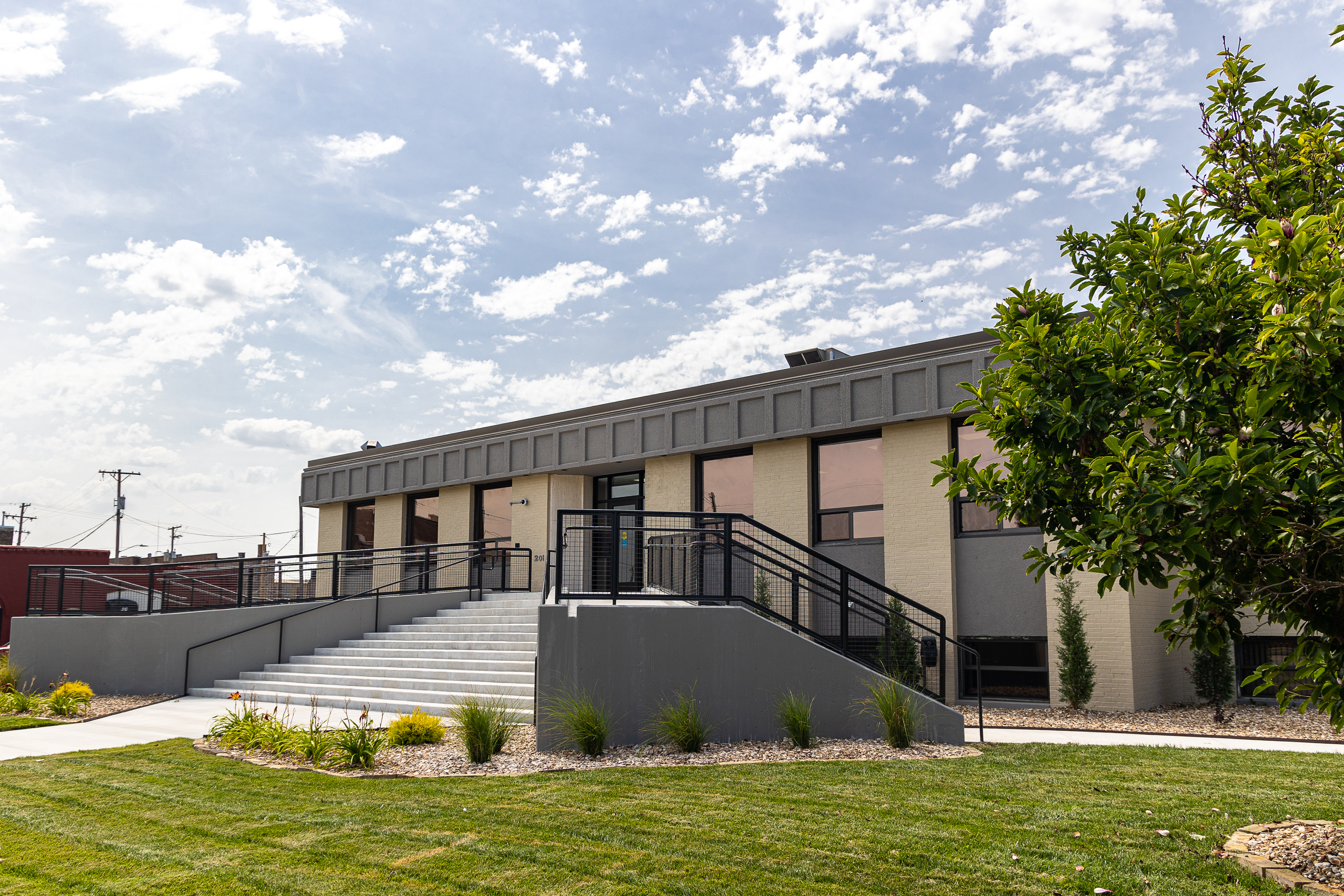
Pittsburg City Hall (2023)

Pittsburg is a charter city of the first class with a commission/manager form of government. The City Manager oversees all City operations and is responsible for all City departments and employees.

City Hall is located at 201 West 4th Street. Offices are open from 8:00 am until 5:00 pm Monday through Friday, but are closed on most holidays.

The responsibilities of the City Commission are to pass ordinances and resolutions, establish policies for the city, approve the annual budget, appoint members of citizen advisory boards and committees, and appoint the City Manager.

Elections for the City Commission are held every other year. In each election, three seats are vacant on the City Commission. The two candidates acquiring the most votes receive four-year terms, while the candidate obtaining the third most votes secures a two-year term. The City Commission annually elects the Mayor and President of the Board. The Mayor, who has the same authority as the other commissioners, presides over the commission meetings, provides the official signature on documents, represents the City at official and ceremonial functions and presents the annual State of the City address. In the absence of the Mayor, the President of the Board fulfills the duties of the Mayor.

== Education ==
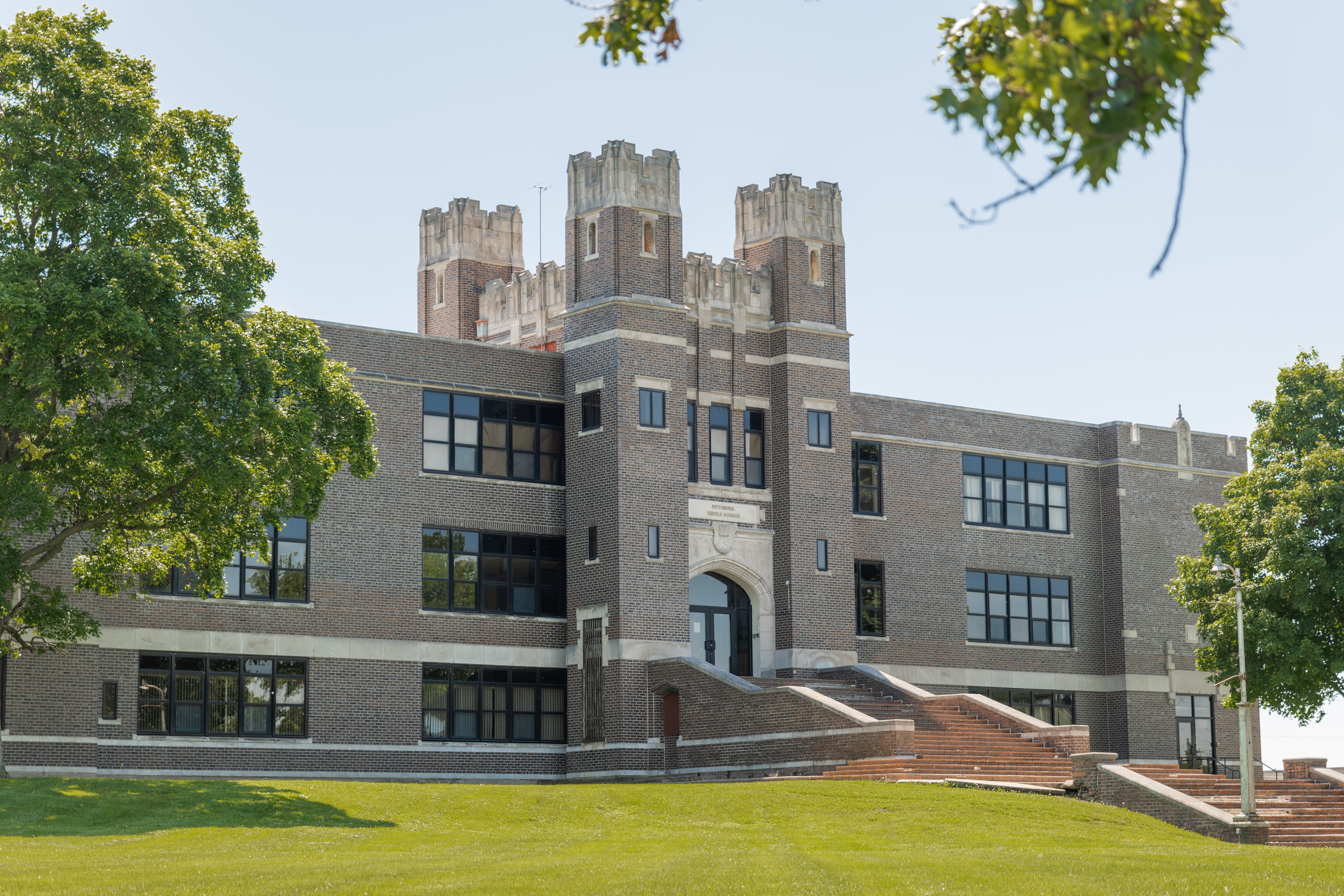
Historic Pittsburg Community Middle School (2020)

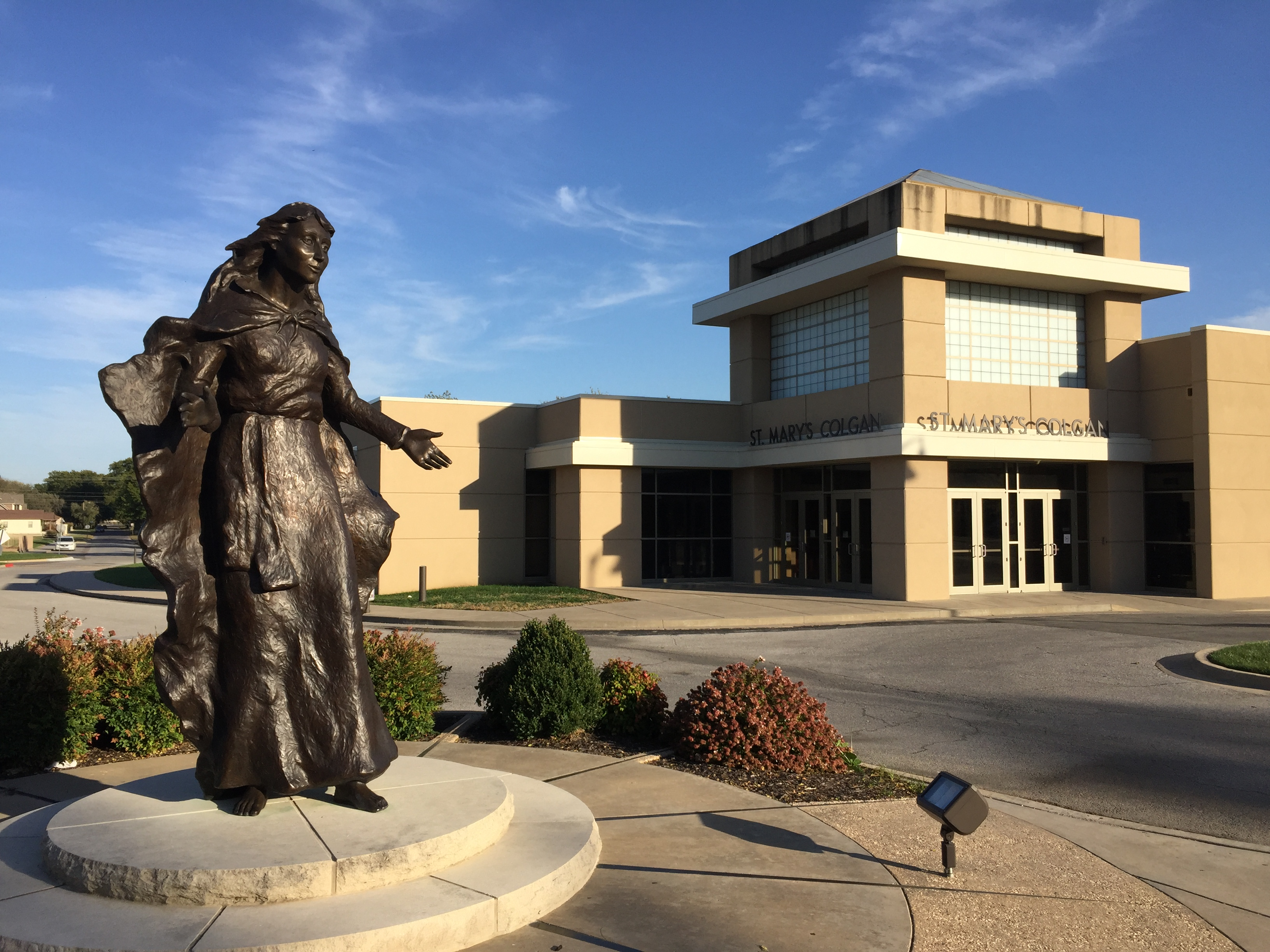
St. Mary's-Colgan High School (2016)

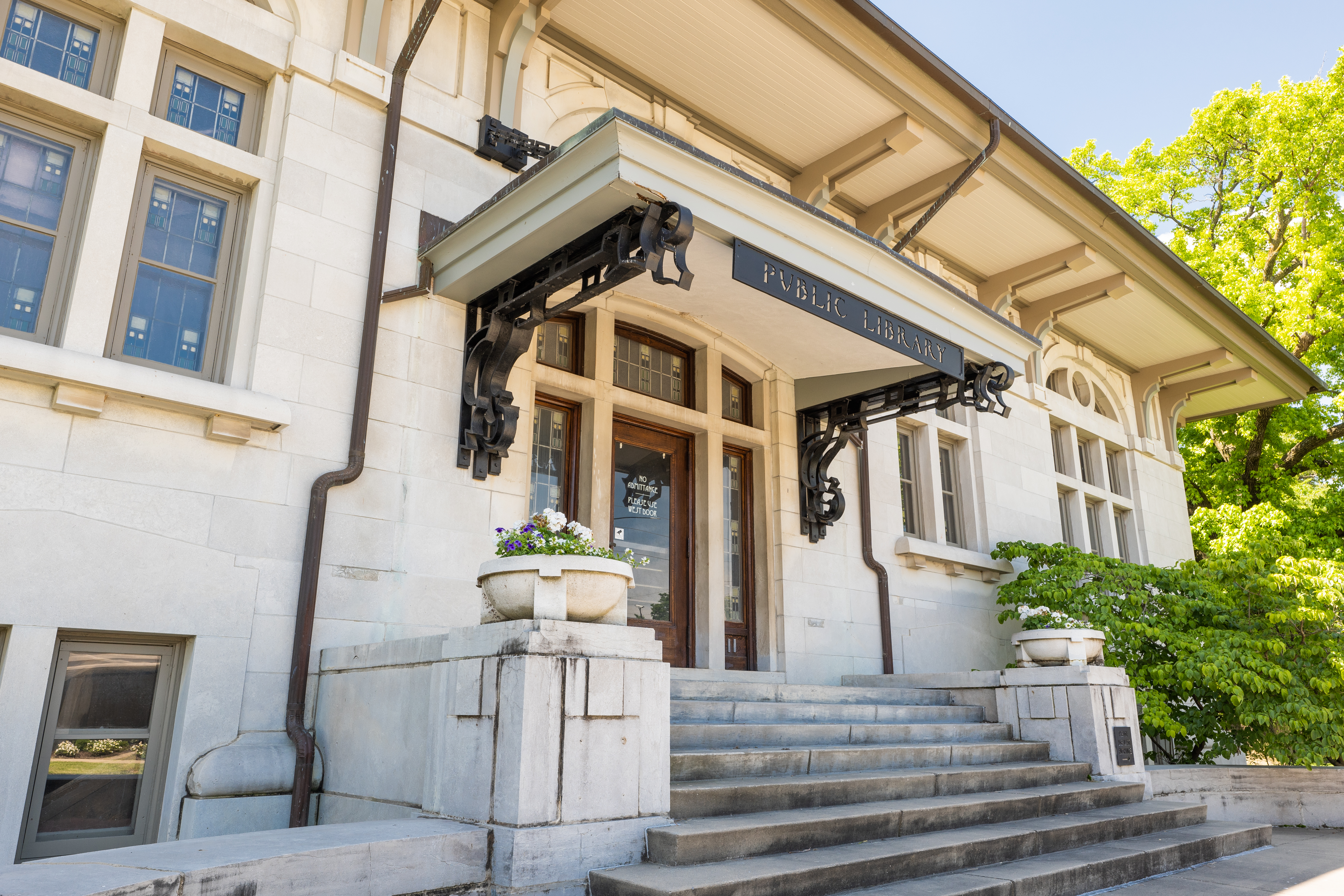
Pittsburg Public Library (2020)

=== Public schools ===
The city is served by Pittsburg USD 250 public school district, which operates the following schools:

- Pittsburg High School
- Pittsburg Community Middle School
- George Nettels Elementary School
- Lakeside Elementary School
- Meadowlark Elementary School
- Westside Elementary School

=== Private schools ===
- St. Mary's-Colgan High School, Parochial Catholic School
- Countryside Christian School, Private Christian School (K-8)
- Covenant Harvest, Christian School

=== College ===
- Pittsburg State University
- Fort Scott Community College, School of cosmetology
- Labette Community College, Cherokee Center

== Media ==
The Pittsburg Morning Sun is the main newspaper in the city, published five days a week. In addition, Pittsburg State University publishes a weekly student newspaper, the Collegio.

Pittsburg is a center of broadcast media for southeastern Kansas. Two AM and five FM radio stations are licensed to and/or broadcast from the city, and it is the second principal city of the Joplin-Pittsburg television market. The market's CBS and Fox network affiliates both broadcast from the city along with an independent station.

== Infrastructure ==
Bus service is provided by Pittsburg Area Community Transit and Gus Bus.

Atkinson Municipal Airport provides general aviation.

Via Christi Hospital serves the area.

== In popular culture ==
In late 2012, NBC news anchor Brian Williams, who started his career in Pittsburg as a journalist at KOAM-TV, covered the local story of a fried chicken war between Chicken Annie's and Chicken Mary's on the Travel Channel. The competition began in 1941 when Chicken Mary's opened across the street from Chicken Annie's (founded 1934). The friendly rivalry continues, with members of each restaurant's founding family, who married, running a third restaurant.
