= National Register of Historic Places listings in Neosho County, Kansas =

Location of Neosho County in Kansas

This is a list of the National Register of Historic Places listings in Neosho County, Kansas. It is intended to be a complete list of the properties and districts on the National Register of Historic Places in Neosho County, Kansas, United States. The locations of National Register properties and districts for which the latitude and longitude coordinates are included below, may be seen in an online map.

There are 10 properties and districts listed on the National Register in the county.

This National Park Service list is complete through NPS recent listings posted November 13, 2026.

== Current listings ==
	Name on the Register	Image	Date listed	Location	City or town	Description
1	Austin Bridge		September 15, 1977 (#77000592)	Western side of Santa Fe St. south of 21st. St. over Little Turkey Creek; 37°39′25″N 95°27′11″W	Chanute	Moved from original location to Santa Fe Park, approved by Register without delisting.
2	First Christian Church		October 4, 2021 (#100007025)	120 West 1st St. 37°34′06″N 95°14′41″W	Erie	
3	Maxwell's Slough Bridge		July 2, 1985 (#85001429)	Off K-57 0.5 miles west and 1 mile south of St. Paul; 37°30′18″N 95°10′49″W	St. Paul	
4	Murray High School	Murray High School	August 23, 2011 (#11000580)	400 W. 3rd St. 37°40′43″N 95°27′33″W	Chanute	
5	Oak Grove School, District 20	Oak Grove School, District 20	June 23, 2016 (#16000405)	20505 20th Rd. 37°23′55″N 95°10′12″W	St. Paul	
6	Osage Mission Infirmary	Osage Mission Infirmary	September 6, 2005 (#05000976)	325 Main St. 37°31′04″N 95°10′18″W	St. Paul	
7	State Street Bridge	State Street Bridge	July 2, 1985 (#85001441)	State St. over Neosho River tributary 37°34′21″N 95°14′25″W	Erie	
8	Sturdevant Hardware Building		June 4, 2026 (#100010601)	29-31 W. Main; 37°40′54″N 95°27′14″W	Chanute	
9	Tioga Inn	Tioga Inn	February 23, 1990 (#90000150)	12 E. Main St. 37°41′00″N 95°27′14″W	Chanute	
10	James and Ella Truitt House	James and Ella Truitt House	April 2, 2014 (#14000117)	305 N. Steuben Ave. 37°41′05″N 95°27′25″W	Chanute	

== See also ==
- List of National Historic Landmarks in Kansas
- National Register of Historic Places listings in Kansas
