= Bideau =

Bideau is a surname. Notable people with the surname include:

- Edith Bideau (1888–1958), American singer and music educator
- Edwin Bideau (1950–2013), American lawyer, farmer, rancher, and politician
- Jean-Luc Bideau (born 1940), Swiss actor
- Jean-Marc Bideau (born 1984), French cyclist
