= Earlton, Kansas =

City in Neosho County, Kansas

- City
- Location within Neosho County and Kansas

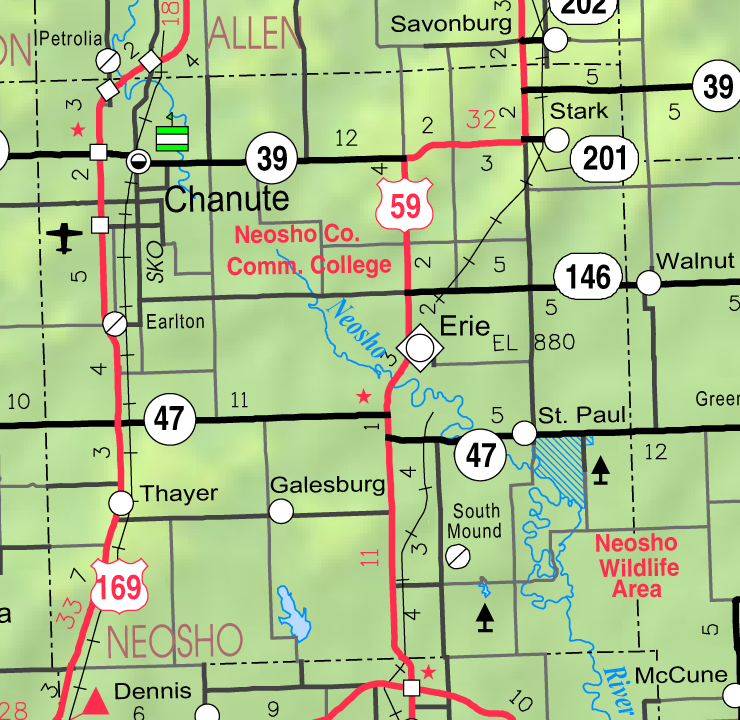
- KDOT map of Neosho County (legend)
- Coordinates: 37°35′15″N 95°28′11″W
- Country: United States
- State: Kansas
- County: Neosho
- Founded: 1870
- Incorporated: 1912

Area
  - Total: 0.16 sq mi (0.41 km^{2})
  - Land: 0.16 sq mi (0.41 km^{2})
  - Water: 0 sq mi (0.00 km^{2})
- Elevation: 961 ft (293 m)

Population (2020)
  - Total: 60
  - Density: 380/sq mi (150/km^{2})
- Time zone: UTC-6 (CST)
  - Summer (DST): UTC-5 (CDT)
- ZIP Code: 66720
- Area code: 620
- FIPS code: 20-19275
- GNIS ID: 2394592

Earlton is a city in Neosho County, Kansas, United States. As of the 2020 census, the population of the city was 60.

== History ==
Earlton (or Earleton) was founded in 1870. Not much progress in the community was made until about 1876 when a railroad depot was built there.

A post office was opened in Earlton (at first called Earleton) in 1871, and remained in operation until it was discontinued in 1976.

== Geography ==
According to the United States Census Bureau, the city has a total area of 0.15 square miles (0.39 km^{2}), all land.

== Demographics ==
Historical population
Census	Pop.	Note	%±
1880	43		—
1920	381		—
1930	166		−56.4%
1940	174		4.8%
1950	141		−19.0%
1960	104		−26.2%
1970	102		−1.9%
1980	79		−22.5%
1990	69		−12.7%
2000	80		15.9%
2010	55		−31.2%
2020	60		9.1%
U.S. Decennial Census

=== 2020 census ===
The 2020 United States census counted 60 people, 24 households, and 22 families in Earlton. The population density was 375.0 per square mile (144.8/km^{2}). There were 26 housing units at an average density of 162.5 per square mile (62.7/km^{2}). The racial makeup was 85.0% (51) white or European American (85.0% non-Hispanic white), 1.67% (1) black or African-American, 1.67% (1) Native American or Alaska Native, 0.0% (0) Asian, 0.0% (0) Pacific Islander or Native Hawaiian, 1.67% (1) from other races, and 10.0% (6) from two or more races. Hispanic or Latino of any race was 3.33% (2) of the population.

Of the 24 households, 54.2% had children under the age of 18; 75.0% were married couples living together; 8.3% had a female householder with no spouse or partner present. 8.3% of households consisted of individuals and 0.0% had someone living alone who was 65 years of age or older. The average household size was 3.1 and the average family size was 3.3. The percent of those with a bachelor's degree or higher was estimated to be 5.0% of the population.

25.0% of the population was under the age of 18, 5.0% from 18 to 24, 23.3% from 25 to 44, 15.0% from 45 to 64, and 31.7% who were 65 years of age or older. The median age was 44.3 years. For every 100 females, there were 87.5 males. For every 100 females ages 18 and older, there were 114.3 males.

The 2016–2020 5-year American Community Survey estimates show that the median household income was $56,250 (with a margin of error of +/- $43,046) and the median family income was $60,625 (+/- $44,784). Females had a median income of $33,375 (+/- $6,557). The median income for those above 16 years old was $32,750 (+/- $8,345). Approximately, 11.4% of families and 21.8% of the population were below the poverty line, including 60.0% of those under the age of 18 and 0.0% of those ages 65 or over.

=== 2010 census ===
As of the census of 2010, there were 55 people, 23 households, and 17 families residing in the city. The population density was 366.7 inhabitants per square mile (141.6/km^{2}). There were 35 housing units at an average density of 233.3 per square mile (90.1/km^{2}). The racial makeup of the city was 96.4% White, 1.8% Native American, and 1.8% from two or more races.

There were 23 households, of which 30.4% had children under the age of 18 living with them, 65.2% were married couples living together, 8.7% had a male householder with no wife present, and 26.1% were non-families. 21.7% of all households were made up of individuals, and 17.4% had someone living alone who was 65 years of age or older. The average household size was 2.39 and the average family size was 2.82.

The median age in the city was 46.5 years. 21.8% of residents were under the age of 18; 1.8% were between the ages of 18 and 24; 25.6% were from 25 to 44; 29.2% were from 45 to 64; and 21.8% were 65 years of age or older. The gender makeup of the city was 45.5% male and 54.5% female.

=== 2000 census ===
As of the census of 2000, there were 80 people, 32 households, and 23 families residing in the city. The population density was 565.3 inhabitants per square mile (218.3/km^{2}). There were 34 housing units at an average density of 240.2 per square mile (92.7/km^{2}). The racial makeup of the city was 95.00% White and 5.00% Native American.

There were 32 households, out of which 31.3% had children under the age of 18 living with them, 62.5% were married couples living together, 6.3% had a female householder with no husband present, and 28.1% were non-families. 21.9% of all households were made up of individuals, and 12.5% had someone living alone who was 65 years of age or older. The average household size was 2.50 and the average family size was 2.96.

In the city, the population was spread out, with 22.5% under the age of 18, 12.5% from 18 to 24, 26.3% from 25 to 44, 20.0% from 45 to 64, and 18.8% who were 65 years of age or older. The median age was 36 years. For every 100 females, there were 90.5 males. For every 100 females age 18 and over, there were 100.0 males.

The median income for a household in the city was $46,250, and the median income for a family was $70,625. Males had a median income of $27,083 versus $28,750 for females. The per capita income for the city was $19,421. There were no families and 7.0% of the population living below the poverty line, including no under eighteens and none of those over 64.

== Education ==
The community is served by Chanute USD 413 public school district.

== Transportation ==
The nearest intercity bus stop is located in Chanute. Service is provided by Jefferson Lines on a route from Minneapolis to Tulsa.
