= KCNU =

KCNU may refer to:

- Chanute Martin Johnson Airport (ICAO code KCNU)
- KCNU (FM), a radio station (103.9 FM) licensed to serve Silver City, Idaho, United States
