= Bridget Hayden =

Roman Catholic missionary nun and educator (1814–1890)

Mother Mary Bridget Hayden
- Born: Margaret Hayden; August 26, 1814; Kilkenny, Ireland
- Died: January 23, 1890 (aged 75); Osage Mission's post, Kansas
- Other name: Mother Superior of the Sisters of Loretto
- Occupations: Missionary, school head mistress

Bridget Hayden, also known as Mother Mary Bridget Hayden (August 26, 1814 – January 23, 1890) was an Irish-born American missionary of the Sisters of Loretto. Hayden became the Mother Superior of a mission. She was known among her students and Native Americans as "Girls' School Leader" and "Medicine Woman".

== Early life ==
On August 26, 1814, (Note: Her date of birth is also stated as August 14, 1814 and her birth year is also said to be 1815.) Margaret Hayden was born in Kilkenny, Ireland to Bridget Hart and Thomas Hayden, a wheelwright. She was the eldest of eight children. (Note: Or one of six children.) In 1820, Hayden's family emigrated to the United States and settled in The Barrens (now Perryville), Missouri. They followed Thomas's father who emigrated and settled in the area in 1818. Hayden and her siblings attended the school established in The Barrens by the Sisters of Loretto and later attended the academy operated by the Sisters in Cape Girardeau, Missouri. Her father died, leaving Hayden to assist her mother to care for and raise their children. Like her, two of her sisters joined the Sisters of Loretto, becoming Mother Elizabeth and Mother Magdalene, and her brother joined the Trappists.

== Missionary ==
=== Sisters of Loretto ===
She became Sister Mary Bridget Hayden of the Sisters of Loretto on September 19, 1841, at the age of 27, at the Sisters of Loretto convent in Old Bethlehem. Hayden took her vows of poverty, chastity, and obedience in September 1842 at St. Vincent's Academy at Cape Girardeau, Missouri, and was stationed at the mission there. She was then assigned to the Loretto Motherhouse in Nerinx, Kentucky.

Father John Schoenmakers, a missionary, arrived at the Loretto Motherhouse in 1846 to find volunteers to work at the Osage Mission's post in what is now St. Paul, Kansas. His goal was to find religious women to staff a school for Osage girls. The women would have to be formidable to take on the primitive and remote accommodations, harsh weather, and significant cultural and religious differences between the Catholic women and the Osage people. The Osage girls were excited to be able to attend the school.

=== Osage School for Girls ===
Hayden and two other sisters—Vincentia McCool and Mary Petronella VanPrather—and Mother Concordia Henning joined Schoenmakers. They traveled by wagon to St. Louis and boarded the steamboat J. J. Harden on September 20, 1847, to Westport, Kansas City, Missouri. They completed their trip to the Osage Mission with a guide and two wagons. They arrived at the mission on October 5, 1847. (Note: She also said to have arrived on October 10, 1847.) That day, the Osage School for Girls was established and opened by Hayden. Hayden inspired her students, rather than forced them, to learn and take on her customs. She treated people equally and was just. Known for her quiet, resolute, and caring manner, she was commonly called Mother Bridget.

According to the Catholic Educational Review, St. Ann's Academy was known as the best educational institution in the state of Kansas, and Hayden's students were known for their intelligence, religious spirit, and intelligence. She encouraged her students to study subjects that interested them.

The Osage lived in poverty on their reservation (treaty of 1825). Hayden attained the name "Medicine Woman" for the care that she gave to girls who she treated for illnesses or injuries.

The Osage Manual Labor School for girls had been operated by Mother Concordia, who became ill and stepped down as Mother Superior in 1859. Hayden then became Mother Superior and operated the school that year.

Both Union and Confederate soldiers visited the mission during the American Civil War (1861–1865) to receive medical care or food.

=== St. Vincent's Academy ===
Hayden faced new challenges when she became Mother Superior at St. Vincent's Academy in Cape Girardeau, Missouri. She refused to take an oath to support the Union, as directed by the Roman Catholic Archdiocese of St. Louis, which was a requirement to teach or preach in the state. Hayden fought legal battles and could have been arrested. The Presbyterian minister treated the Loretto sisters harshly.

=== St. Ann's Academy ===
When Hayden returned to the mission in 1866 or 1867, the school was undergoing dramatic changes as the Osage were leaving for Oklahoma (Trail of Tears), and missionaries were not allowed to accompany them.

The mission then operated schools for children of White settlers. The St. Ann's Academy, operated by Hayden, and St. Francis Institute, led by Schoenmakers, were established in 1870. St. Ann's was a boarding school for girls, where the students studied music and art, in addition to the regular school curriculum. It was the first boarding school in Kansas.

The number of students and sisters employed at the school grew over time and a large three-story stone building, the main building, was constructed by 1871. It was the largest stone building in Kansas at the time. Ten years later, another stone school building was built.

== Death ==
Hayden continued to run the St. Ann's Academy until she became ill with Russian influenza and then died of bronchitis on January 23, 1890. Businesses were closed in town and her body lay in state for two days, during which she was visited by people across the United States, including the Mother General from Kentucky. She was buried in a convent cemetery near the school, and was moved to St. Francis Cemetery in 1930.

== Legacy ==
- Her picture in the veil worn at the time by the Sisters of Loretto was installed at the Kansas State Capitol building in Topeka, Kansas in remembrance of her work during the frontier days of Kansas.

== Bibliography ==
- "The Guiding Light of the Osages". The Catholic Educational Review. Vol. 39. Catholic University of America Press. 1941.
- Graves, W. W. (1916). Life and letters of Fathers Ponziglione, Schoenmakers, and other early Jesuits at Osage mission. Sketch of St. Francis' church. Life of Mother Bridget. St. Paul, Kansas: W.W. Graves.
