= Kent Thompson =

American politician

Member of the Kansas House of Representatives from the 9th district
- In office October 16, 2013 – January 9, 2023
- Preceded by: Edwin Bideau
- Succeeded by: Fred Gardner

Personal details
- Born: November 1, 1963 (age 62) Allen County, Kansas, U.S.
- Party: Republican
- Spouse: Susan
- Children: 2
- Profession: rancher/realtor/auctioneer

Kent Thompson (born November 1, 1963) is an American politician. He served as a Republican member of the Kansas House of Representatives for the 9th district from 2013 to 2023.

He served as majority whip of the Kansas House of Representatives, holding the post from 2017 to 2019. For the 2019–2020 session he served as the chairman of the House Local Government Committee and as a member of the House Transportation Committee and the House Agriculture Committee.

Preceded by Willie Dove	Kansas House of Representatives Majority Whip; January 10, 2017 - January 15, 2019	Succeeded by Blake Carpenter
