= Chanute USD 413 =

Public school district in Kansas, United States

Address
- 321 E Main Street Chanute, Kansas, 66720; United States
- Coordinates: 37.68154°N 95.44826°W

District information
- Type: Public
- Grades: PreK to 12
- Schools: 4

Other information
- Website: usd413.org

Chanute USD 413 is a public unified school district headquartered in Chanute, United States. The district includes the communities of Chanute, Earlton, Petrolia, and nearby rural areas.

== Schools ==
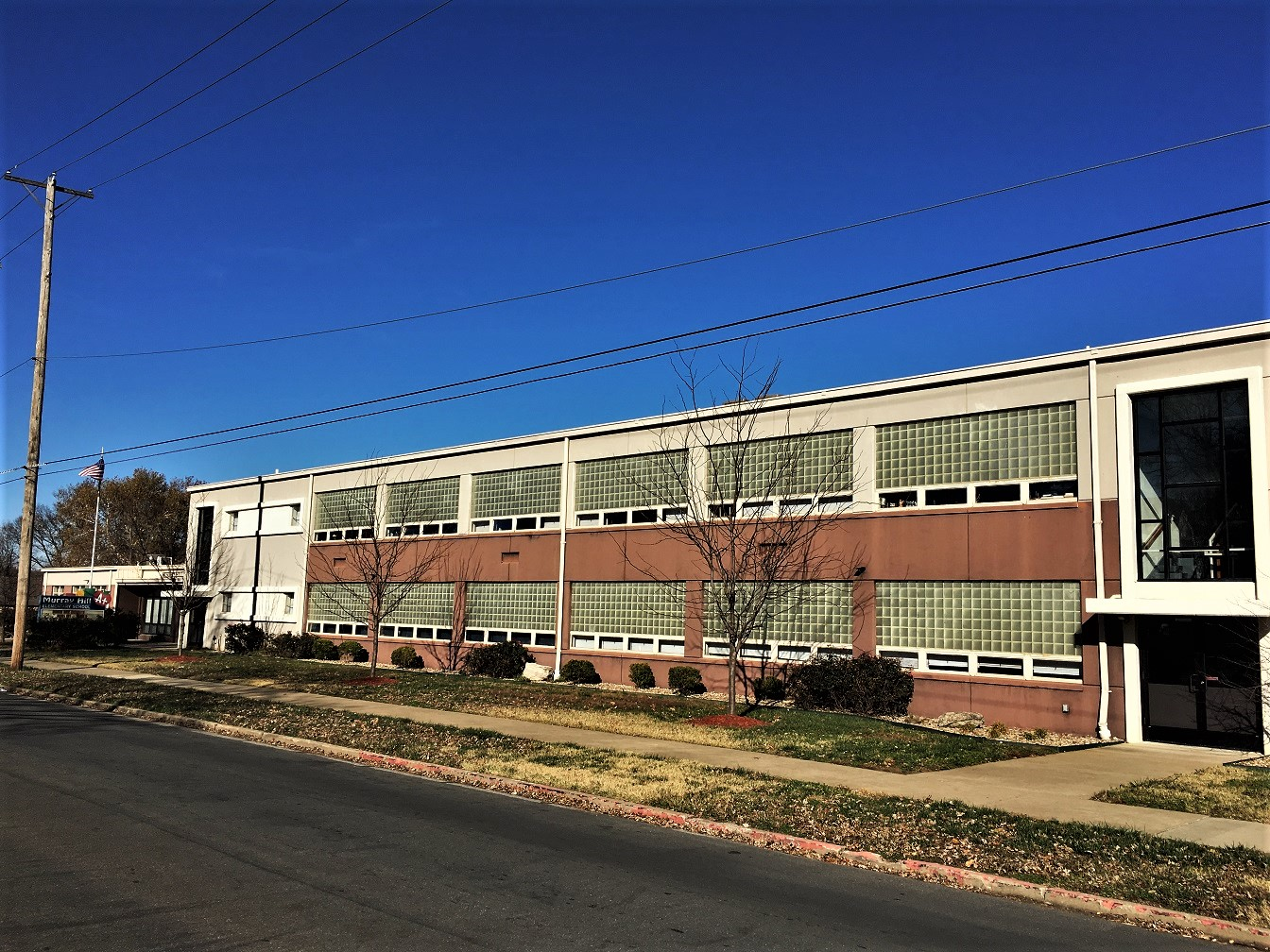
Murray Hill Elementary, previously was Murray High School (2017)

The school district operates the following schools:

- Chanute High School (9-12)
- Royster Middle School (6-8)
- Chanute Elementary School (K-5) - opened in 2009 to consolidate four elementary schools
- Lincoln Early Learning Center (PreK)

Closed schools

- Alcott Elementary School (closed in 2009)
- Hutton Elementary School (closed in 2009)
- Murray Hill Elementary School (closed in 2009)

== See also ==
- Kansas State Department of Education
- Kansas State High School Activities Association
- List of high schools in Kansas
- List of unified school districts in Kansas
