= Murray Hill Elementary School =

- U.S. National Register of Historic Places
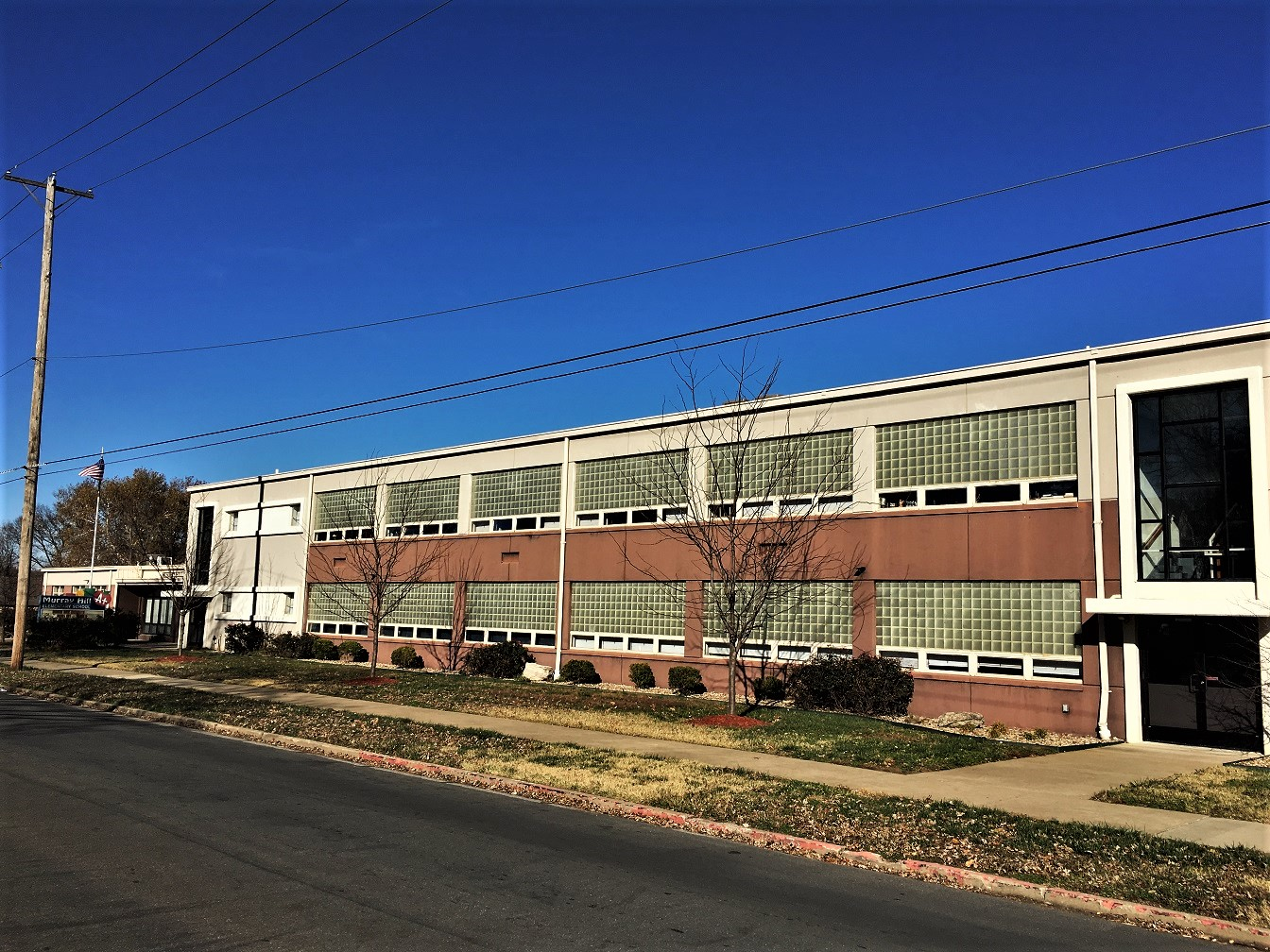

- Location within Kansas Location within the United States
- Location: 400 W. 3rd St. Chanute, Kansas
- Coordinates: 37°40′43″N 95°27′33″W
- Area: 4 acres (1.6 ha)
- Built: 1951-52
- Architect: Williamson & Loebsack
- NRHP reference No.: 11000580
- Added to NRHP: August 23, 2011

The Murray Hill Elementary School was a public school in Chanute, Kansas. It was listed on the National Register of Historic Places in 2011.

== History ==
It is a two-story U-shaped structure which was built during 1951–52.

It was built on the site of the 1887 first school in Chanute, which was replaced in 1902 after a fire in 1901. In 1951 the present building was designed by Topeka architects Williamson & Loebsack. It reflected Modern Movement architecture. It was used to the end of the 2008–2009 school year when Chanute USD 413 public school district built a school on the outskirts of Chanute to consolidate three separate elementary schools.
