= Historic Oak Grove Schoolhouse =

One-room school in Southeast Kansas

- Oak Grove School, District 20
- U.S. National Register of Historic Places
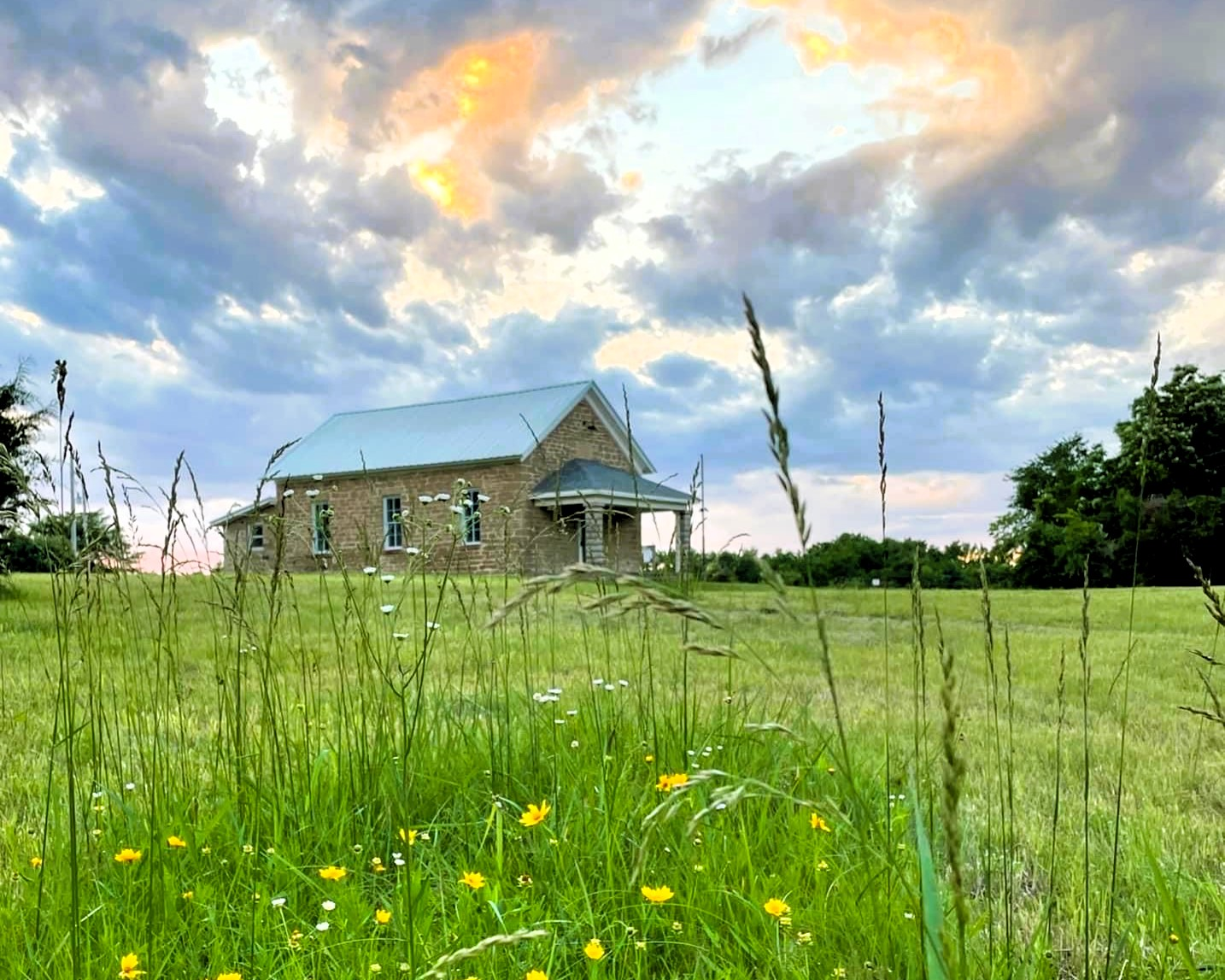
- Oak Grove Schoolhouse in 2018
- Location: St. Paul, Kansas
- Coordinates: 37°23′55″N 95°10′12″W
- Built: 1877
- Built by: George Clark Osgood
- Architectural style: Vernacular architecture
- Website: historicoakgroveschool.com
- MPS: Historic Public Schools in Kansas
- NRHP reference No.: 16000405
- Added to NRHP: 2016

The Historic Oak Grove Schoolhouse is a fully restored, and furnished, one-room school structure located about seven miles northeast of Parsons, Kansas and about eight miles south of St. Paul, Kansas. It stands on its original 1877 building site within Lincoln Township in Neosho County, where it was constructed from local native sandstone. Initially built in 1868 and rebuilt in 1877, Oak Grove School, District No. 20 closed in 1960 after more than 90 years of service.

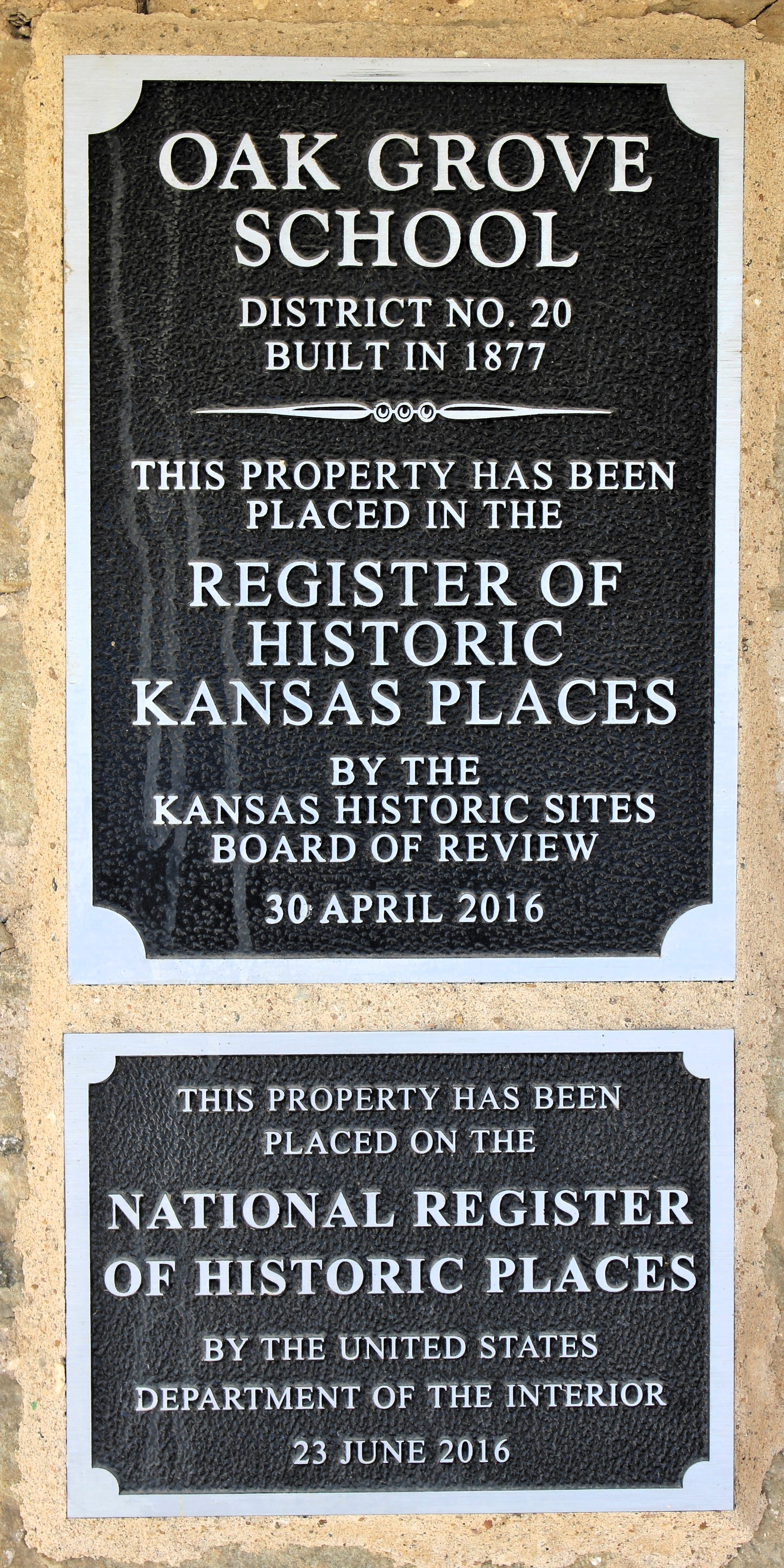
Listed on both Kansas and National Historic Registers

Both the Oak Grove Schoolhouse and adjacent Oak Grove Cemetery are listed on the Register of Historic Kansas Places and the National Register of Historic Places. Funding from grants and donations is administered by the Oak Grove School Historical Society for repair, maintenance, improvement, and operating costs.

The schoolhouse sits on the south side of 20th Road, one-half mile east of Trego Road, in southeast Neosho County, Kansas.

== Early settlements ==
In the early 1800s, much of what is now Southeast Kansas was inhabited by the indigenous Osage Indian Nation as well as by explorers, missionaries, and traders. In 1865, following the American Civil War, the Osage ceded a large tract of land to the U.S. Government which opened the floodgate for settlers pouring into, and across, Kansas on their push westward. Many, however, remained in Southeast Kansas to homestead the land for farming and development. As families settled the area, school districts were formed and one-room schoolhouses were built to provide local children with a structured formal education.

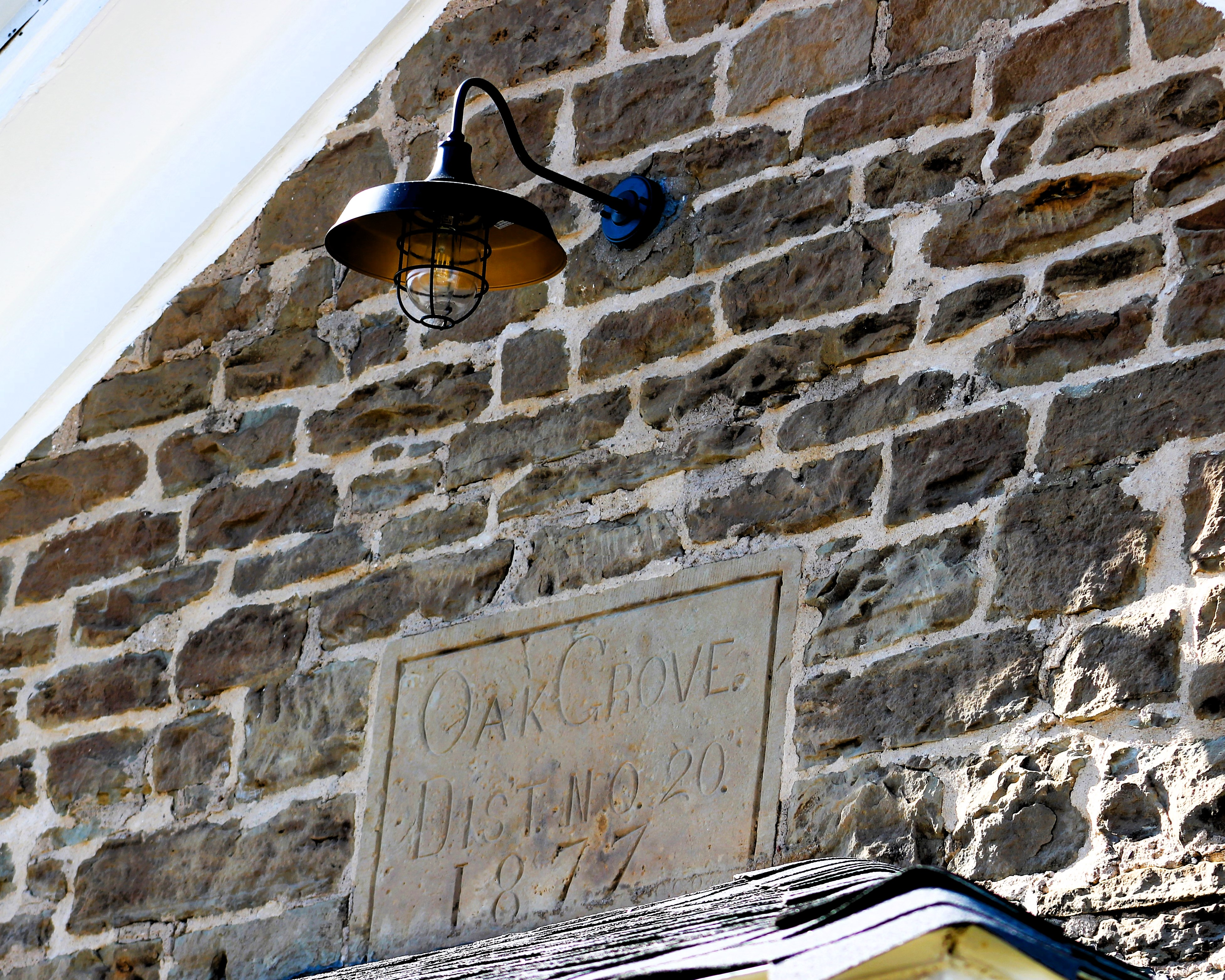
Stone marker reading, "Oak Grove Dist. No. 20. 1877"

== Oak Grove School District No. 20 ==
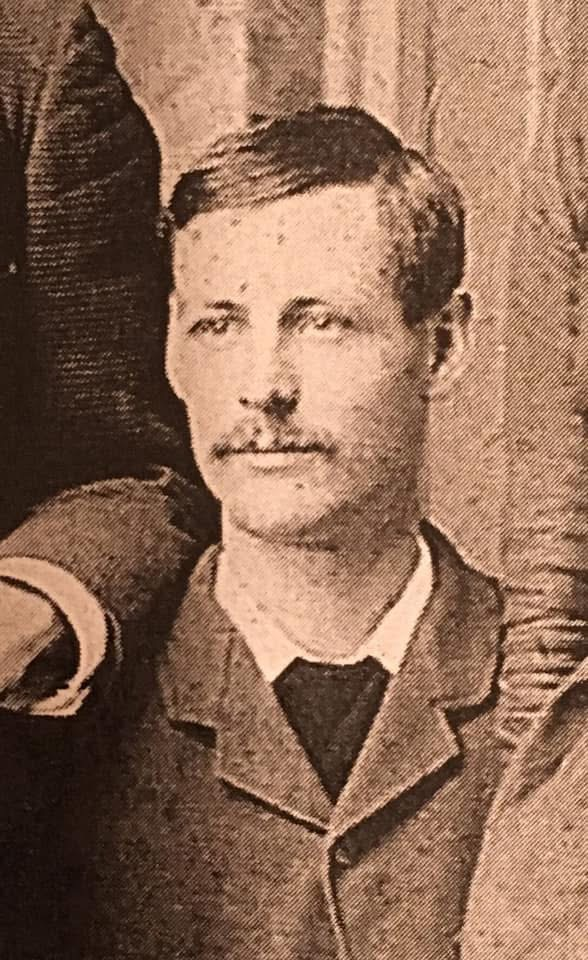
Clay D. Herod, the first teacher at the "new" Oak Grove School, in 1877

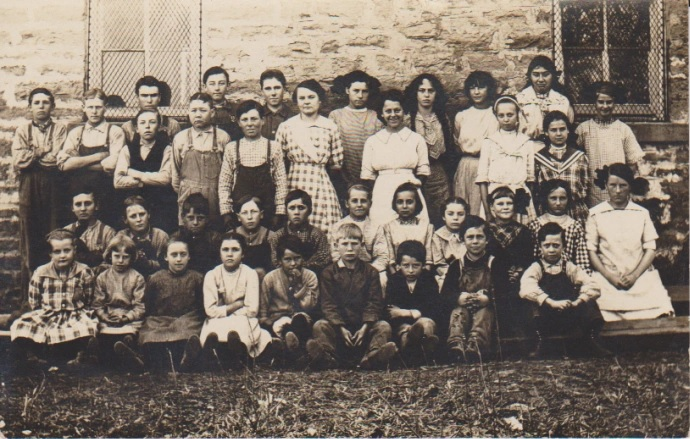
The earliest known class photo of Oak Grove School, taken in 1912

Oak Grove School District No. 20 was established sometime prior to 1868 however, records for this early period are incomplete or missing and not much is known about the first few years of the school district.

The first schoolhouse of Oak Grove School, District No. 20 was built in 1868, three-quarters of a mile northeast from the current schoolhouse location. It's believed to have been a relatively small wooden structure situated in a low-lying area.

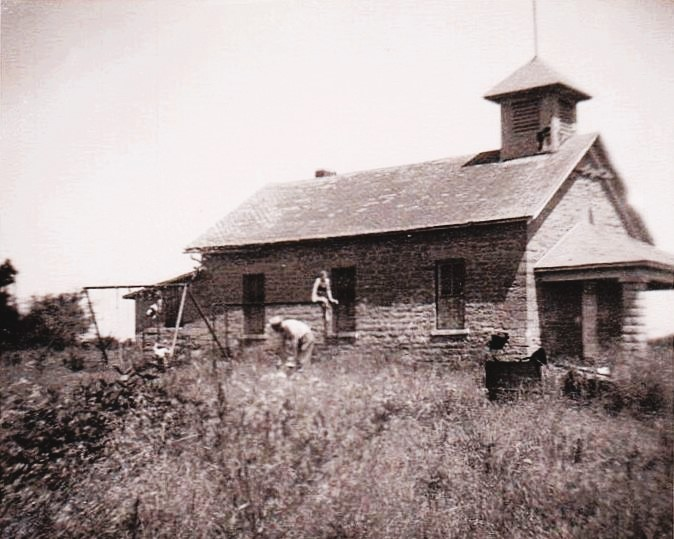
Oak Grove Schoolhouse in 1942

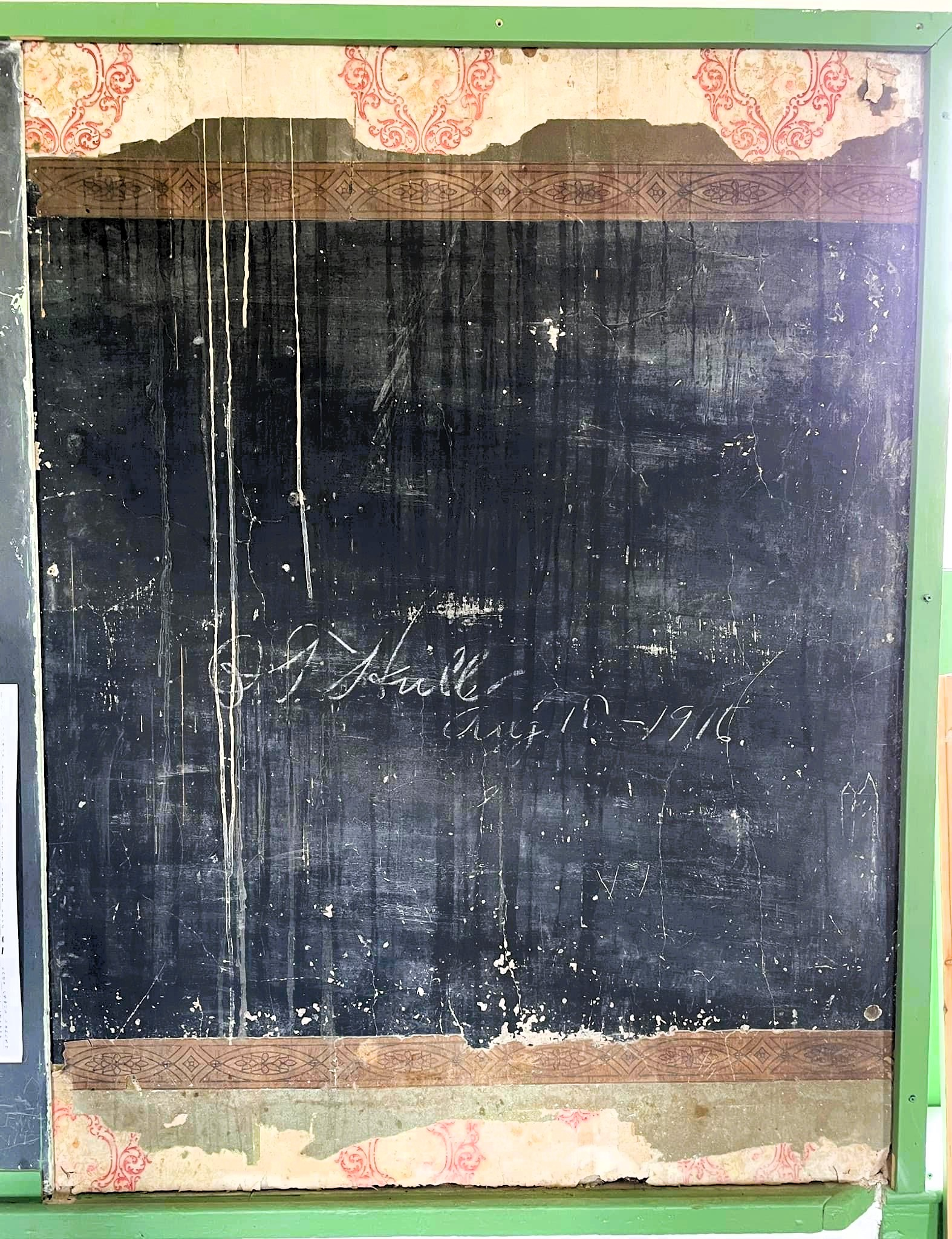
1800s slate board with preserved signature of then School Superintendent, O.T. Hull

There is no record for precisely why the original schoolhouse and cemetery were relocated in 1877, but early resident accounts suggest that the "old" schoolhouse was too small for the growing number of students in the area, and the location in Section 25 was undesirable due to frequent flooding and snake infestations. Another possible reason may have been related to right of way claims by the newly established Katy Railroad.

== Osage Trail and Oak Grove ==
The Osage Trail, which included the Osage Trace, is a series of trails established by the Osage people long before the arrival of non-native people. One trail used by the Osage to cross the Neosho River was located seven miles south of Osage Mission (now modern-day Saint Paul, Kansas). This river crossing came to be known as Trotter's Ford and was often used by settlers who couldn't afford to cross the Neosho River by ferry near Osage Mission.

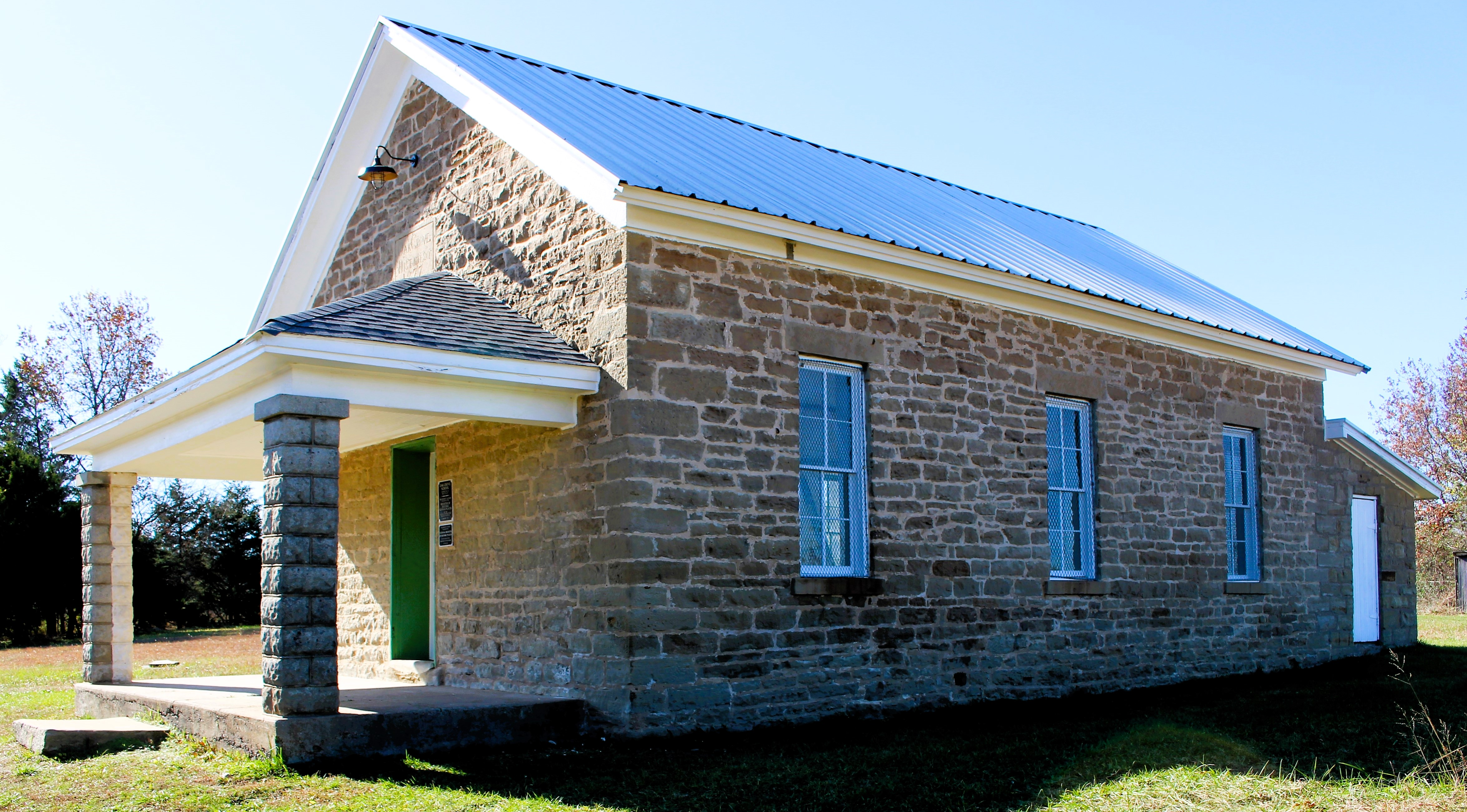
Oak Grove Schoolhouse after restoration

Since improved roads were non-existent, the "old" and "new" Oak Grove Schoolhouses were built along the existing Osage Trace, which overlapped the Continental Trail west from Trotter's Ford. This route went south, directly in front of the current Oak Grove schoolhouse, to a juncture where travelers could either continue south toward Oswego, Kansas and onto Fort Gibson, Oklahoma, or west along the Continental Trail toward Independence, Kansas.

== Notable events ==
After the Civil War, pilgrimage across the Central Plains was intense, with many travelers homesteading, establishing reputable businesses, and some committing illegal acts, along the way. As the railroads expanded further south and west, so did the expansion and establishment of new settlers

Sept/Oct 1869

- The Charles Ingalls family arrived in Southeast Kansas. Traveling from Missouri, the family settled just west of Independence, Kansas.

May 10–11, 1870

- On May 10, 1870, the Katy Railroad reached Ladore, Kansas (about eight miles west of Oak Grove School). The following day, five men were lynched at Ladore for "drunken crimes".

February 1871

- The notorious Bender family settled on their farm in Neosho County, about 18 miles west-southwest of Oak Grove School, where they built an "inn" along the established route to Independence. They were suspected of killing more than 20 travelers over a period of 19 months.

Spring of 1871

- The Charles Ingalls family departed southeast Kansas, traveling from the Independence area back to Missouri.

== Future improvements ==
Although the schoolhouse is fully restored, additional improvements are planned to help fulfill the Oak Grove School Historical Society's mission to provide education and enrichment for future generations.

Proposed improvements include:

- Wheelchair accessibility for all areas of the schoolhouse and surrounding areas.
- Modern restroom facilities located near the schoolhouse.
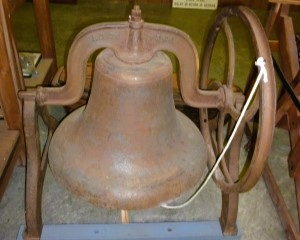
  The school bell originally located atop of Oak Grove Schoolhouse
- A covered picnic pavilion located south of the schoolhouse, with the same footprint dimensions of the schoolhouse, which will feature the original school bell.
- A visitor center and museum to provide historic information and resource materials as well as displaying local artifacts.
- A period style playground area located east of the schoolhouse.

== Oak Grove School Historical Society ==
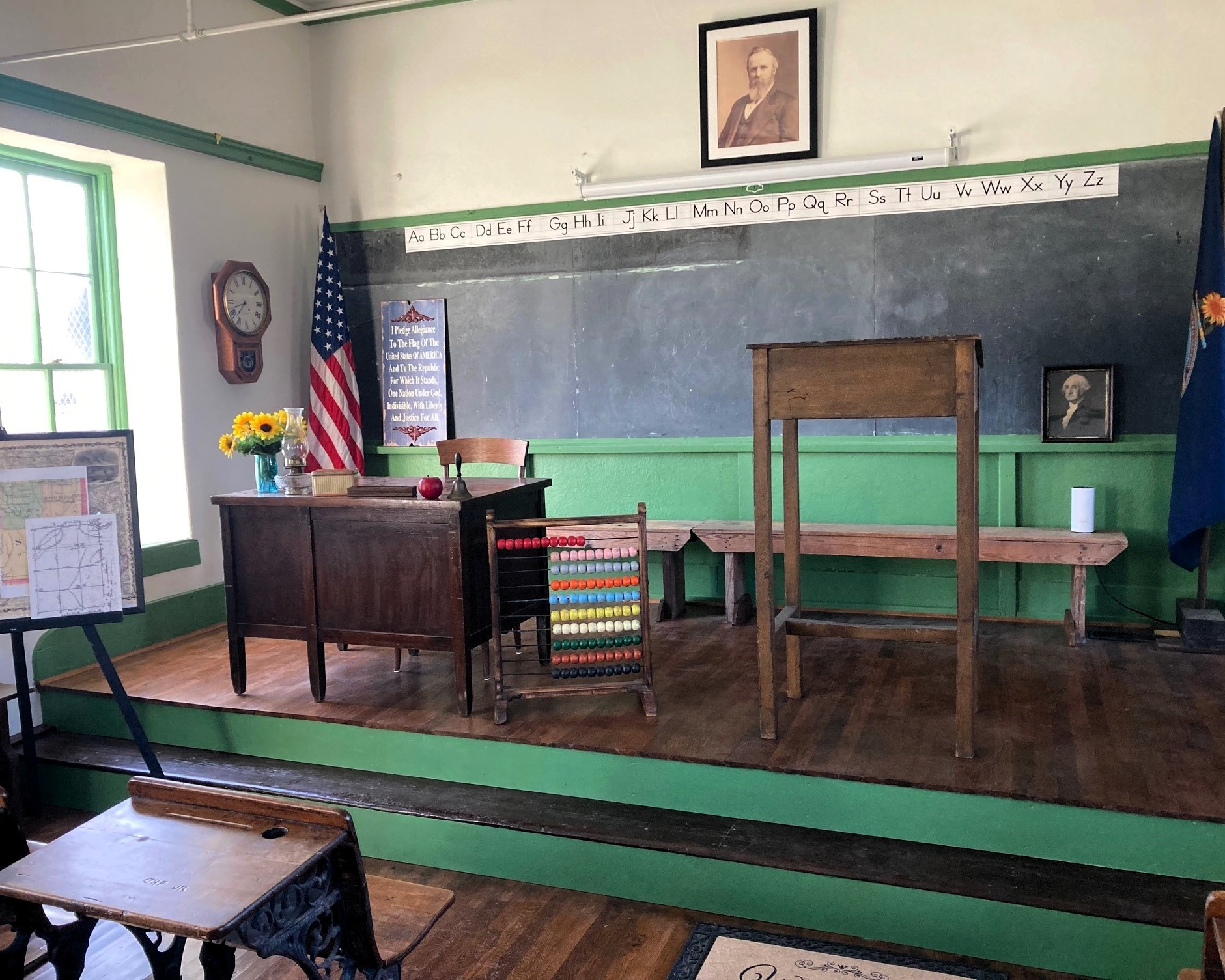
Oak Grove School interior after renovation

The Oak Grove School Historical Society is a tax exempt 501(c)(3) organization that was formed to oversee all aspects of restoration, operation, and improvements for the Oak Grove School, the adjoining cemetery, and adjacent facilities. The Board consists of a:

- President
- Vice-President
- Secretary
- Treasurer
- Public Relations Officer
- Historian
- Education Program Specialist
- Local Education Advisor
