= Bill Otto (Kansas politician) =

American politician

Member of the Kansas House of Representatives from the 9th district
- In office January 10, 2005 – January 10, 2013
- Preceded by: Stanley Dreher
- Succeeded by: Edwin Bideau

Personal details
- Born: July 17, 1948 (age 78)
- Party: Republican
- Spouse: JoNita Otto died June 10, 2022
- Children: 4

William Clyde Otto (July 17, 1948) is a former politician who served as a Republican member of the Kansas House of Representatives, representing the 9th district from 2005 to 2012. He was succeeded by Edwin Bideau.

== Career ==
Prior to his election to the House, Otto served on the Southern Coffey County Site Council (2003–2006), LeRoy City Council (2002–2004), Unified School District 245 Site Council (2000–2003), and the Unified School District 247 Cherokee (1984).

Receiving both his bachelor's and master's degrees from Pittsburg State University, Otto served as principal at Central Heights Elementary (1976–1978) and McCune High School (1978–79). He also worked as a performance accreditation director for USD 245 (1984–2004).

== Controversies ==
Otto is known for his expressing his political opinions in controversial ways. In 2009, the representative was criticized by a national civil rights organization for a video he had posted on YouTube, called "RedNeck Rap", in which he criticized President Barack Obama while wearing a hat with the words "Opossum: The Other Dark Meat". Otto claimed that the criticism was unfair and that the slogan on his hat was a reference to his "Ozark-American" heritage, not Obama. Otto also made a comparison between Obama and Adolf Hitler in a 2012 letter to the editor.

== Committee membership ==
- Education
- Health and Human Services
- Elections
- Local Government
- Joint Committee on Children's Issues

== Major donors ==
The top 5 donors to Otto's 2008 campaign were mostly professional associations:

- 1. Kansas Medical Society $1,000
- 2. Union Pacific Railroad $700
- 3. Kansas Dental Assoc $600
- 4. Kansas Contractors Assoc $600
- 5. Lewis, Diana C $500
