= Edith Bideau =

American soprano singer

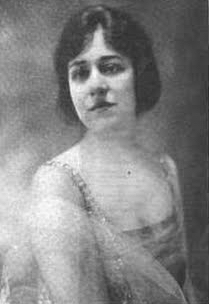
- Edith Bideau, from a 1920 publication.
- Born: November 6, 1888; Chanute, Kansas, US
- Died: 1958 (aged 69–70)
- Other names: Edith Normelli
- Occupation(s): singer, music educator
- Years active: 1912-1958

Edith Mae Bideau (November 6, 1888 – 1958), later Edith Bideau Normelli, was an American soprano and music educator from Kansas.

== Early life ==
Edith Mae Bideau was from Chanute, Kansas, the daughter of Georges K. Bideau and Jennie Hale Bideau. Her father was a councilman in Chanute. She earned bachelor's degrees from Baker University in Baldwin City, Kansas in 1911, where she wrote the school song, "Hail! Old Baker"; and from Kansas State University in 1912. She pursued further music studies in Italy, and with Richard Hageman in New York.

== Career ==
Bideau taught voice and was director of the vocal department at the State Normal School in Pittsburg, Kansas from 1916 to 1919. At the beginning of World War I, she was in Italy, and there were concerns for her safety. When she returned to the United States, she gave concerts for troops stationed in Kansas. She was director of music and instructor in church music at Seabury-Western Theological Seminary in Evanston, Illinois in 1935. She taught voice at Iola, Kansas in 1947.

Bideau was a concert and oratorio soloist in Chicago and Pittsburgh. She made her New York debut in 1920, at Aeolian Hall. "Her voice is a soprano of very pure quality, a voice that is at its best in lyric matters," noted one reviewer. Another witness, however, reported that "she was altogether too nervous to inspire critical confidence." She toured the midwest as a performer in 1921. On Christmas Day in 1921, she sang solos at six different events in New York City. She wrote "Tone Coloring in Singing" an essay published in Étude magazine in 1955.

== Personal life ==
Edith Bideau married Swedish diplomat Carl Gustav Normelli in 1920. She was widowed when Normelli died in 1957, and she died in 1958, aged 69. Kansas legislator Edwin Bideau was her great-nephew, her brother Edwin Hale Bideau's grandson.
