= Neosho County Community College =

Public college in Chanute, Kansas, US

- Former name: Chanute Junior College (1936-1965)
- Motto: Enriching Lives
- Type: Public community college
- Established: 1936 (Chanute); 1991 (Ottawa)
- President: Brian Inbody
- Faculty: 396
- Students: 1,791 (Fall 2023)
- Location: Chanute, Kansas, United States; 37°40′12″N 95°27′51″W
- Campus: Rural
- Colors: Black and orange
- Nickname: Panthers
- Website: neosho.edu

Neosho County Community College (NCCC) is a public community college in Chanute, Kansas. It has a secondary campus in Ottawa, Kansas. It is accredited by the Higher Learning Commission.

== History ==
In 1936, it was established as Chanute Junior College. On July 1, 1965, it was renamed to Neosho County Community Junior College.

== Campuses ==
The Chanute Campus of NCCC allows students to live on campus and have a dinner plan. This campus is more designed for full-time traditional students. It is also the larger of the two campuses.

The Ottawa campus is different from Chanute campus in that the former has no housing available. This campus is more designed for part-time nontraditional students, though significant numbers of traditional students also attend this campus. Students at Ottawa High School are offered numerous dual-credit college courses through this campus.

== Notable alumni ==
- Jannero Pargo, NBA Player and coach
- Edwin Bideau, lawyer and politician
- David Bote, professional baseball player
- Olga Fedori, actress
- Matt Strahm, professional baseball player
- Patrick Williams – professional MMA fighter for the UFC
- Andy Young, professional baseball player
