= Osage Mission Infirmary =

- U.S. National Register of Historic Places
- Osage Mission Infirmary in 2026

- Location within Kansas Location within the United States
- Location: 325 Main St., St. Paul, Kansas
- Coordinates: 37°31′04″N 95°10′18″W
- Area: 0.4 acres (0.16 ha)
- Built: 1872
- Architectural style: Second Empire
- NRHP reference No.: 05000976
- Added to NRHP: September 6, 2005

The Osage Mission Infirmary, located at 325 Main St. in St. Paul, Kansas, was built in 1872 to serve as an infirmary for members of the Osage Nation. It was moved in 1912 and then served as a private residence. It was listed on the National Register of Historic Places in 2005.

Known also as the Dodd House, it is Second Empire in style. It is 35 by 32 feet (10.7 m × 9.8 m) in plan.
