= Chanute Martin Johnson Airport =

Airport in Kansas, United States

Coordinates: 37°40′08″N 095°29′06″W

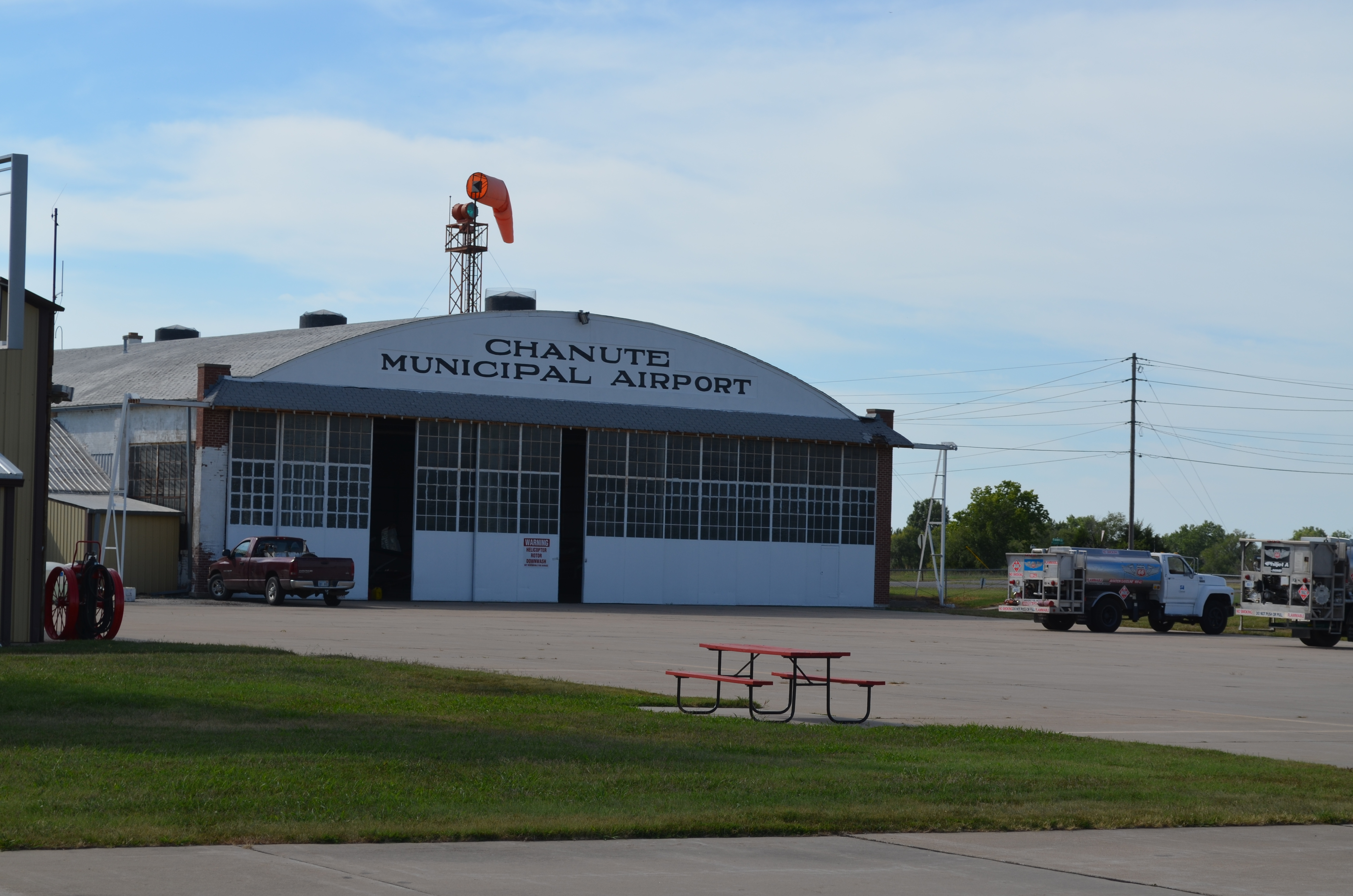
- IATA: CNU; ICAO: KCNU; FAA LID: CNU

Summary
- Airport type: Public
- Owner: City of Chanute
- Serves: Chanute, Kansas
- Elevation AMSL: 1,002 ft (305 m)

Map

Runways
| Direction | Length | | Surface |
| Direction | ft | m | Surface |
|---|---|---|---|
| 18/36 | 4,255 | 1,297 | Asphalt |

Statistics
- Aircraft operations (2016): 1,700
- Based aircraft (2022): 15
- Source: Federal Aviation Administration

Chanute Martin Johnson Airport (IATA: CNU, ICAO: KCNU, FAA LID: CNU) is a city-owned airport located two miles southwest of Chanute, in Neosho County, Kansas. It is named for Martin Johnson, of the husband-and-wife explorers Martin and Osa Johnson, although it was Osa and not Martin who was native to Chanute.

== Facilities ==
The airport covers 290 acres (120 ha) at an elevation of 1,002 feet (305 m) above mean sea level. It has one runway: 18/36 is 4,255 x 75 ft (1,297 x 23 m) asphalt.

In the year ending December 31, 2016 the airport had 1,700 aircraft operations, an average of 5 per day: 99% general aviation and less than 1% military. In March 2022, there were 15 aircraft based at this airport: 13 single-engine and 2 multi-engine.

== See also ==
- List of airports in Kansas
