= Tioga Inn =

United States historic place

- U.S. National Register of Historic Places
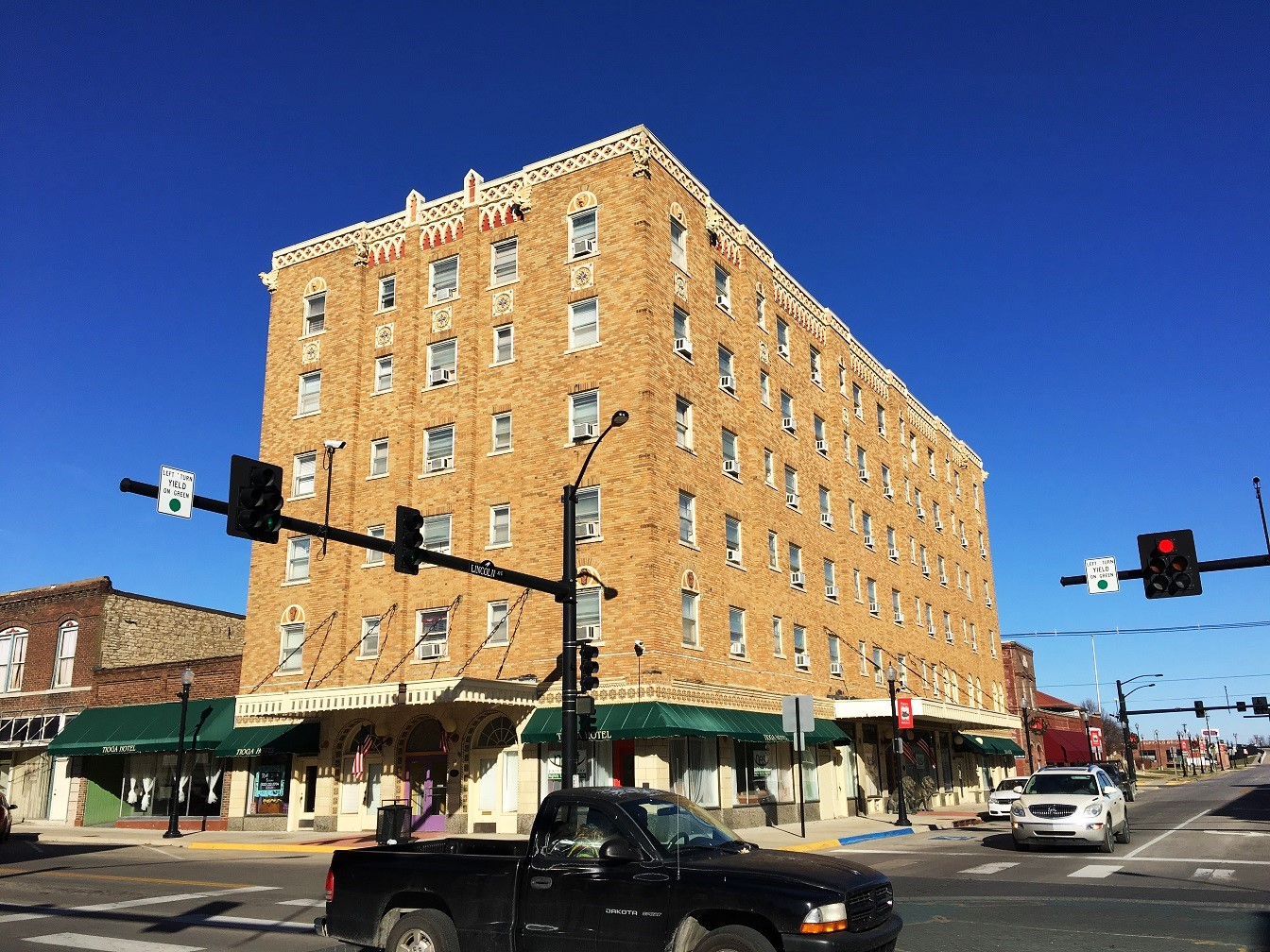

- Location within Kansas Location within the United States
- Location: 12 E. Main St. Chanute, Kansas
- Coordinates: 37°41′00″N 95°27′14″W
- Area: less than one acre
- Built: 1929
- Built by: Pratt, John W.
- Architectural style: Late 19th And 20th Century Revivals, Mediterranean Revival
- NRHP reference No.: 90000150
- Added to NRHP: February 23, 1990

The Tioga Inn in Chanute, Kansas was built in 1929. Over the years it has also been known as The Tioga Hotel, The Tioga, and The Jones' Building. It was listed on the National Register of Historic Places in 1990. It is a six-story 100-room hotel which dominates the skyline of Chanute.

It was designed and constructed by Chanute contractor John W. Pratt.
