= James and Ella Truitt House =

Historic house in Kansas, United States

- U.S. National Register of Historic Places
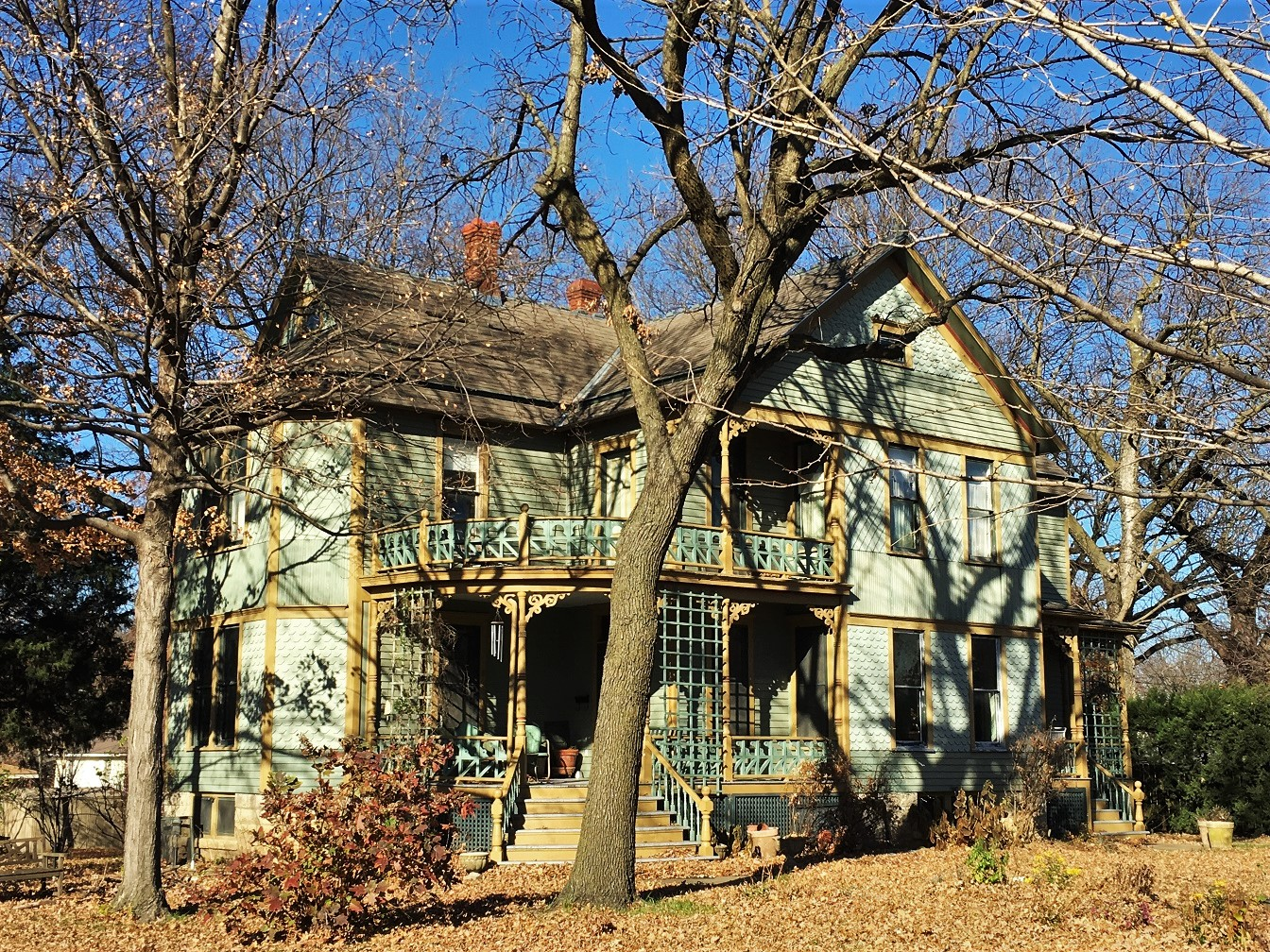

- Location within Kansas Location within the United States
- Location: 305 N. Steuben Ave. Chanute, Kansas
- Coordinates: 37°41′05″N 97°27′25″W
- Area: less than one acre
- Built: 1887
- Architectural style: Queen Anne
- NRHP reference No.: 14000117
- Added to NRHP: April 2, 2014

The James and Ella Truitt House, located at 305 N. Steuben Ave. in Chanute, Kansas, was listed on the National Register of Historic Places in 2014.

It is a Queen Anne-style house which was built in 1887.

It was deemed significant "for its association with James Truitt, a locally significant nurseryman who operated Truitt & Sons Greenhouse and founded Chanute Nurseries. This Victorian-era Queen Anne residence also is nominated ... for its local significance in the area of architecture."
