= St. Paul, Kansas =

City in Neosho County, Kansas

- City
- Location within Neosho County and Kansas

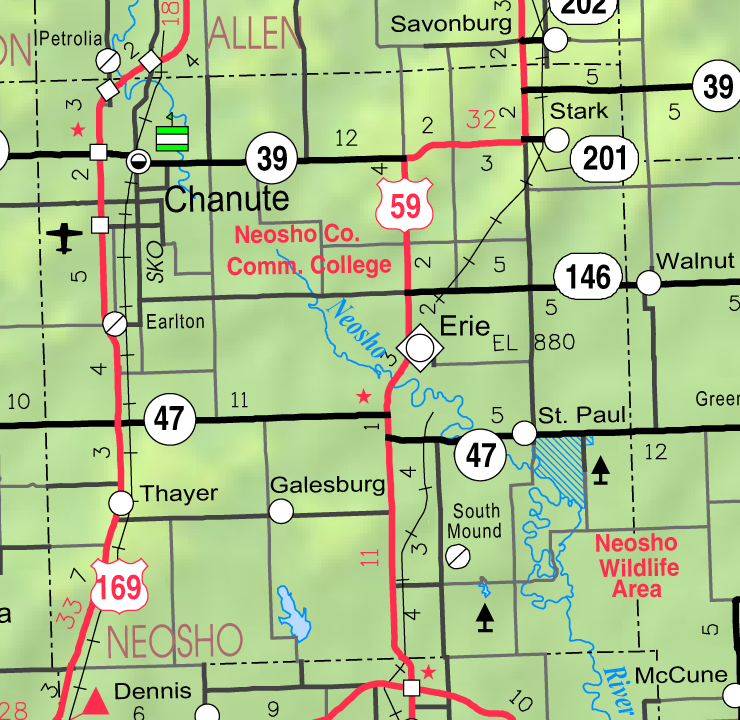
- KDOT map of Neosho County (legend)
- Coordinates: 37°31′06″N 95°10′27″W
- Country: United States
- State: Kansas
- County: Neosho
- Founded: Osage Mission (1857); St. Paul (1895)
- Incorporated: 1869

Area
  - Total: 1.17 sq mi (3.02 km^{2})
  - Land: 1.17 sq mi (3.02 km^{2})
  - Water: 0 sq mi (0.00 km^{2})
- Elevation: 896 ft (273 m)

Population (2020)
  - Total: 614
  - Density: 527/sq mi (203/km^{2})
- Time zone: UTC-6 (CST)
  - Summer (DST): UTC-5 (CDT)
- ZIP Code: 66771
- Area code: 620
- FIPS code: 20-62500
- GNIS ID: 2396514
- Website: stpaul-ks.net

St. Paul or Saint Paul is a city in Neosho County, Kansas, United States. The population of the city was 614 as of the 2020 census.

== History ==
Father John Schoenmakers, S.J. founded Osage Mission on April 28, 1847. Called the "Apostle to the Osage" and the "Father of civilization in Southeast Kansas," he served for 36 years as spiritual director, doctor, steward, lawyer, judge, catechist and preacher to the Osage. He served as an officially-appointed U.S. postmaster of Osage Mission from 1851 to 1864. With the relocation of the Osage, he ministered to the needs of the newly-arrived white settlers. He built the present St. Francis Church stone structure. Father Schoenmakers is buried in St. Francis Cemetery one-quarter mile east of the church.

The other leading man in the Osage Mission was Kentucky-born John Allan Mathews. He was married to Mary Williams and, after her death, to her sister, Sarah Williams. The Williams sisters were the daughters of William S. Williams and his Osage wife, A-Ci'n-Ga. They first met Mathews while attending school in Kentucky after their mother died. Mathews was a slaveholder and southern sympathizer. He married Mary in Jackson County, Missouri in 1835 and was appointed blacksmith for the Seneca in 1837 and for the Osage in 1839. In about 1861, he gathered a group of Osage who tried to force Schoenmakers to flee the area because they disagreed with his abolitionist ideas. Matthews was killed by the 6th Kansas Cavalry under Gen. James G. Blunt in a skirmish at Chetopa, Kansas on September 18, 1861.

During the Civil War, both Union and Confederate troops took an interest in Osage Mission. From about December 1862 to June 1865 Union soldiers were intermittently stationed at or near the mission. At least a couple times, Confederate supporters entered Osage Mission or were in the immediate vicinity. For more information see Osage Mission's post.

As early as 1883, there was agitation to change the name of Osage Mission because it suggested it was still an Indian mission. "Neona" was suggested to honor the daughter of Osage Chief Little Bear (who is buried near Neodesha), but local protests favored the name of "St. Paul." The reigning judge decided to allow the citizens to vote on the new name and St. Paul was chosen in an election held on April 11, 1895. Some claim the new name was selected to honor the Apostle Paul, but it was most probably selected in honor of St. Paul of the Cross, founder of the Passionists, who had just then established a home in Osage Mission. The name of the post office was officially changed from Osage Mission to Saint Paul in May 1895.

The historic St. Francis Hieronymo Church, dedicated in 1884, was renovated in 2007 due to a storm on June 30, 2005 that knocked off the steeple. The Osage Mission-Neosho County Museum is directly south of the church. The Lone Elm School, a one-room schoolhouse that operated from 1867 through 1951, stands on the museum grounds.

A visit to the St. Francis Parish Cemetery reflects much of the history of the Osage Mission, as does the only remaining structure of the girls' school established by Mother Bridget Hayden when she arrived at the mission in 1847. The Osage Mission Infirmary & Guest House is listed on the National Register of Historic Places and is managed under the name "St. Ann's Bed and Breakfast." The owners strive to maintain its history and authentic design.

St. Paul's homecoming is called Mission Days. It is held annually on Memorial Day Weekend with activities that begin on Thursday and conclude on Monday, including: races, music shows, dances, pony and draft horse pulls, parade, horseshoe tournament, carnival, kids games, golf tournament, calf penning and Calcutta, and Memorial Day services at the local cemeteries.

== Geography ==
According to the United States Census Bureau, the city has a total area of 1.22 square miles (3.16 km^{2}), all land.

== Demographics ==
Historical population
Census	Pop.	Note	%±
1870	791		—
1880	1,306		65.1%
1890	1,097		−16.0%
1900	1,047		−4.6%
1910	927		−11.5%
1920	974		5.1%
1930	800		−17.9%
1940	869		8.6%
1950	783		−9.9%
1960	675		−13.8%
1970	804		19.1%
1980	746		−7.2%
1990	687		−7.9%
2000	646		−6.0%
2010	629		−2.6%
2020	614		−2.4%
U.S. Decennial Census

=== 2010 census ===
As of the census of 2010, there were 629 people, 240 households, and 153 families residing in the city. The population density was 515.6 inhabitants per square mile (199.1/km^{2}). There were 259 housing units at an average density of 212.3 per square mile (82.0/km^{2}). The racial makeup of the city was 98.1% White, 0.3% Native American, 0.3% Asian, 0.2% from other races, and 1.1% from two or more races. Hispanic or Latino of any race were 1.3% of the population.

There were 240 households, of which 30.4% had children under the age of 18 living with them, 51.3% were married couples living together, 8.8% had a female householder with no husband present, 3.8% had a male householder with no wife present, and 36.3% were non-families. 32.9% of all households were made up of individuals, and 16.6% had someone living alone who was 65 years of age or older. The average household size was 2.44 and the average family size was 3.12.

The median age in the city was 41.5 years. 24.5% of residents were under the age of 18; 6.3% were between the ages of 18 and 24; 21.8% were from 25 to 44; 23.3% were from 45 to 64; and 24.2% were 65 years of age or older. The gender makeup of the city was 49.4% male and 50.6% female.

=== 2000 census ===
As of the census of 2000, there were 646 people, 226 households, and 148 families residing in the city. The population density was 576.7 inhabitants per square mile (222.7/km^{2}). There were 241 housing units at an average density of 215.2 per square mile (83.1/km^{2}). The racial makeup of the city was 97.21% White, 0.15% African American, 0.62% Native American, 0.62% Asian, 0.93% from other races, and 0.46% from two or more races. Hispanic or Latino of any race were 2.32% of the population.

There were 226 households, out of which 33.6% had children under the age of 18 living with them, 54.4% were married couples living together, 7.5% had a female householder with no husband present, and 34.1% were non-families. 29.2% of all households were made up of individuals, and 19.0% had someone living alone who was 65 years of age or older. The average household size was 2.63 and the average family size was 3.28.

In the city, the population was spread out, with 26.6% under the age of 18, 7.9% from 18 to 24, 24.9% from 25 to 44, 17.8% from 45 to 64, and 22.8% who were 65 years of age or older. The median age was 39 years. For every 100 females, there were 84.6 males. For every 100 females age 18 and over, there were 89.6 males.

The median income for a household in the city was $33,393, and the median income for a family was $41,563. Males had a median income of $30,385 versus $19,926 for females. The per capita income for the city was $16,012. About 6.1% of families and 10.7% of the population were below the poverty line, including 9.2% of those under age 18 and 15.4% of those age 65 or over.

== Government ==
In 2013, the city bought St. Paul Supermarket, which it had helped launch in 2008, converted it to a municipally-operated grocery store.

== Education ==
St. Paul is served by three Chetopa–St. Paul USD 505 public schools:

- St. Paul Elementary School
- St. Paul Junior High School
- St. Paul High School

== Historical Sites ==
St. Paul has three listed sites: the Osage Mission Infirmary (325 Main St.), the Oak Grove School District 20 (20505 20th Rd), and Maxwell's Slough Bridge (off K-57 .5 miles west and 1 mile south of St. Paul).

== Transportation ==
The nearest intercity bus stop is located in Chanute. Service is provided by Jefferson Lines on a route from Minneapolis to Tulsa.

== Notable people ==
- Mary Lease (1850–1933), political activist, lecturer

== See also ==
- Great Flood of 1951
