= Edwin Bideau =

American politician

Ed Bideau III

Member of the Kansas House of Representatives from the 9th district
- In office January 10, 2011 – September 5, 2013
- Preceded by: Bill Otto
- Succeeded by: Kent Thompson

Member of the Kansas House of Representatives from the 5th district
- In office 1985–1988

Personal details
- Born: October 1, 1950 Chanute, Kansas
- Died: September 5, 2013 (aged 62) Chanute, Kansas
- Party: Republican
- Spouse: Margaret Bideau
- Education: Neosho County Community College; Washburn University
- Profession: Attorney

Edwin H. Bideau III (October 1, 1950 – September 5, 2013) was a lawyer, farmer, rancher, and Republican member of the Kansas House of Representatives, representing the 9th district (Neosho County, Kansas and Allen County, Kansas).

Bideau was a 5th generation Kansan who graduated from Chanute High School, Neosho County Community College, and then went on to get both a business and law degree from Washburn University in Topeka, Kansas, where he met and married his wife Margaret. They moved back to Chanute the day after Bideau passed the bar exam so he could serve as Assistant County Attorney for Neosho County. In 1976 he was elected County Attorney. In 1984 he was elected to the Kansas House of Representatives, representing the 5th district (Neosho County, Kansas). He chaired the House Reapportionment Committee and chaired a subcommittee that produced the very first Division of Assets bill to help protect elderly couples when nursing home care is required. He was named one of the top ten freshman legislators by Kansas Magazine his first year in office. Bideau left the legislature after two successful terms to help raise his children, but returned in 2012 to the Kansas House of Representatives, representing the 9th district (Neosho County, Kansas and Allen County, Kansas), after a landslide victory in the Republican primary and running unopposed in the general election. He served in this position until his death in September 2013.
