= Chanute, Kansas =

City in Neosho County, Kansas, US

- City
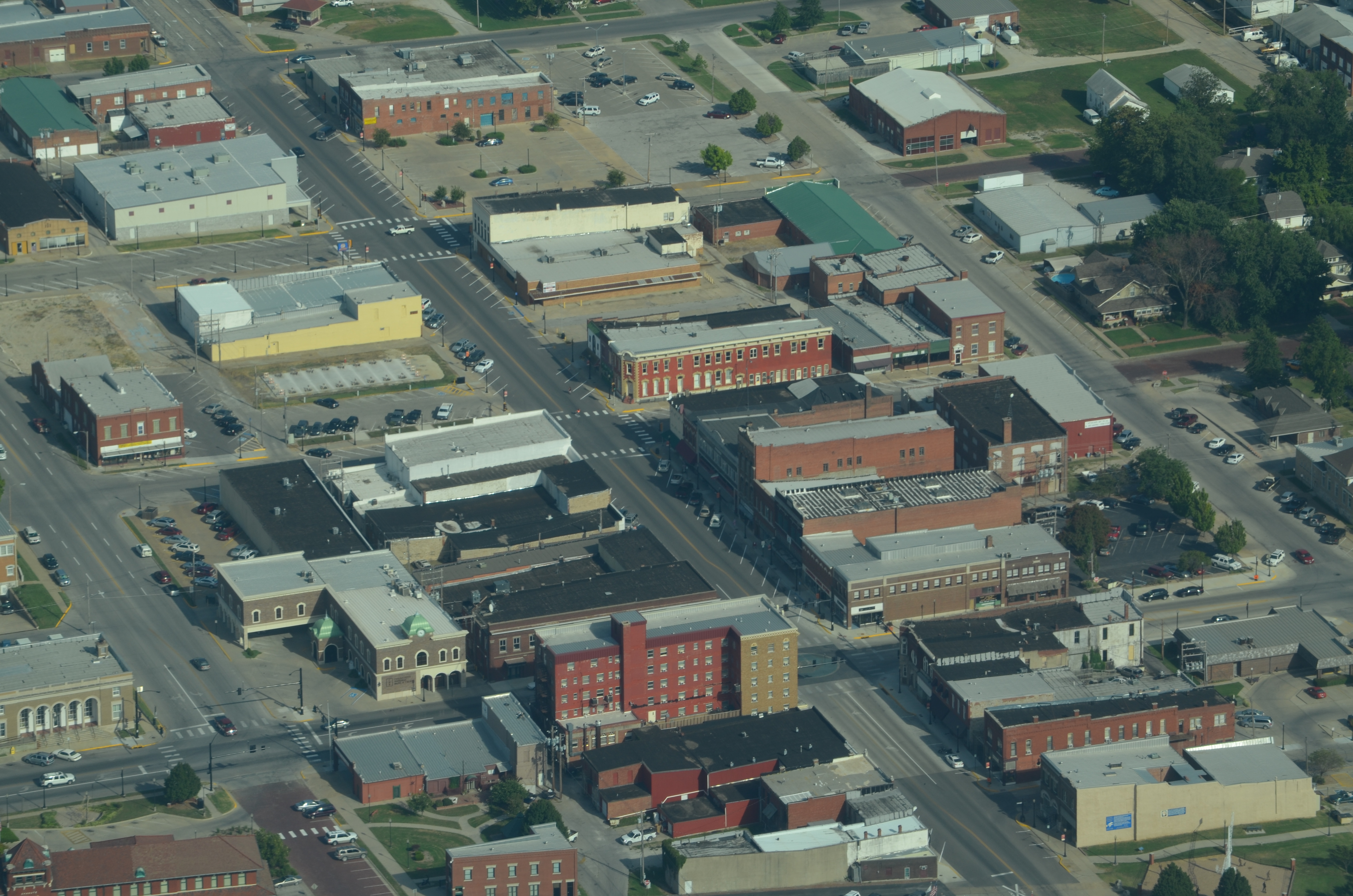
- Aerial view of Chanute (2013)

- Location within Neosho County and Kansas

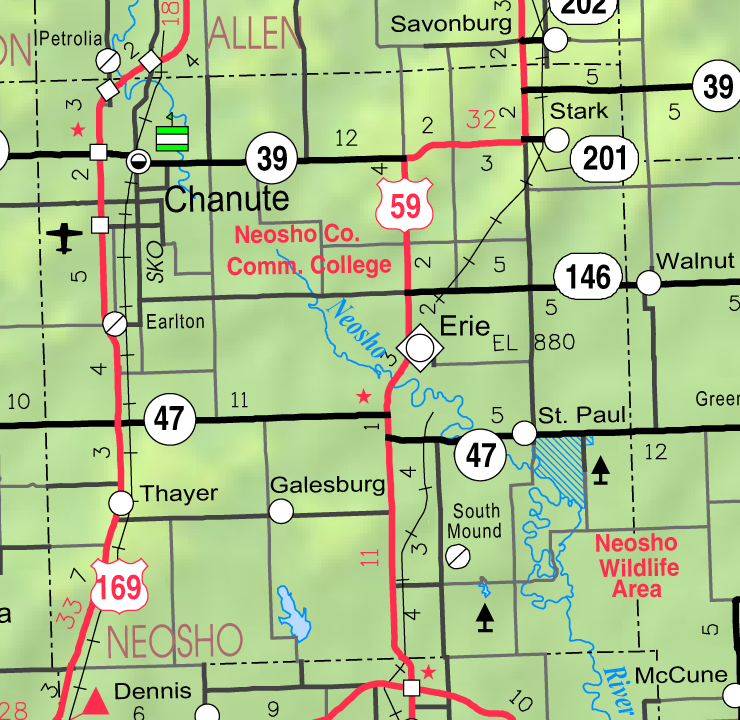
- KDOT map of Neosho County (legend)
- Coordinates: 37°40′10″N 95°27′43″W
- Country: United States
- State: Kansas
- County: Neosho
- Founded: 1873
- Incorporated: 1873
- Named for: Octave Chanute

Government
  - Mayor: Jacob LaRue
  - City Manager: Todd Newman

Area
  - Total: 7.22 sq mi (18.70 km^{2})
  - Land: 7.10 sq mi (18.38 km^{2})
  - Water: 0.12 sq mi (0.32 km^{2})
- Elevation: 974 ft (297 m)

Population (2020)
  - Total: 8,722
  - Density: 1,229/sq mi (474.5/km^{2})
- Time zone: UTC-6 (CST)
  - Summer (DST): UTC-5 (CDT)
- ZIP Code: 66720
- Area code: 620
- FIPS code: 20-12500
- GNIS ID: 485552
- Website: chanute.org

Chanute (/ʃəˈnuːt/) is a city in Neosho County, Kansas, United States. Founded on January 1, 1873, it was named after railroad engineer and aviation pioneer Octave Chanute. As of the 2020 census, the population of the city was 8,722. Chanute is home of Neosho County Community College.

== History ==
In 1870 when the Leavenworth, Lawrence & Galveston Rail Road (later the Atchison, Topeka & Santa Fe, now the BNSF Railway) crossed the Missouri, Kansas and Texas line within the limits of Neosho county four rival communities sprang up, in the vicinity of the junction: New Chicago, Chicago Junction, Alliance, and Tioga. Two years of the most bitter animosity ensued until the four were consolidated in 1872, and the name of Chanute given it in honor of Octave Chanute, a railroad civil engineer.

Settlers had begun populating the area as early as 1856. With the LL&G Railroad set to arrive shortly thereafter, the early residents of the communities of Tioga, Chicago Junction, Alliance, and New Chicago needed an innovative solution to an escalating dispute over which would claim the right to house the LL&G Railroad's new land office. They were unable to settle their differences until an individual by the name of Octave Chanute arrived. Octave was the Chief Engineer and General Superintendent of the LL&G Railroad. In 1872, he suggested the communities merge to end the bickering. On January 1, 1873, they merged to become Chanute.

With the Southern Kansas Railroad locating a division headquarters in Chanute, the city began to flourish. In 1887, Chanute boasted a rapid growth in flourmills, grain elevators, banks, drug and hardware stores, and natural gas. In 1903, the City of Chanute established the electric utility, and in the years to follow, established the gas, water, wastewater, refuse utilities. Ash Grove Cement Company, the sixth largest cement manufacturer in North America, commenced cement manufacture in 1908 in Chanute. In September 2011 Spirit AeroSystems announced the expansion of an assembly facility which will grow to 150 employees in five years and boost the local economy.

== Geography ==
According to the United States Census Bureau, the city has a total area of 7.15 square miles (18.52 km^{2}), of which 7.03 square miles (18.21 km^{2}) is land and 0.12 square miles (0.31 km^{2}) is water.

=== Climate ===
According to the Köppen Climate Classification system, Chanute has a humid subtropical climate, abbreviated "Cfa" on climate maps. The hottest temperature recorded in Chanute was 116 °F (46.7 °C) on July 18, 1936, while the coldest temperature recorded was −23 °F (−30.6 °C) on January 30, 1949.

Climate data for Chanute, Kansas, 1991–2020 normals, extremes 1894–present
Month	Jan	Feb	Mar	Apr	May	Jun	Jul	Aug	Sep	Oct	Nov	Dec	Year
Record high °F (°C)	75 (24)	83 (28)	95 (35)	96 (36)	99 (37)	108 (42)	116 (47)	113 (45)	107 (42)	98 (37)	89 (32)	80 (27)	116 (47)
Mean maximum °F (°C)	66.5 (19.2)	72.1 (22.3)	80.1 (26.7)	84.4 (29.1)	88.0 (31.1)	94.0 (34.4)	99.5 (37.5)	99.8 (37.7)	94.6 (34.8)	86.3 (30.2)	75.1 (23.9)	67.4 (19.7)	101.2 (38.4)
Mean daily maximum °F (°C)	41.2 (5.1)	46.6 (8.1)	56.7 (13.7)	65.9 (18.8)	74.1 (23.4)	83.6 (28.7)	88.2 (31.2)	87.8 (31.0)	80.6 (27.0)	68.7 (20.4)	55.7 (13.2)	44.3 (6.8)	66.1 (19.0)
Daily mean °F (°C)	31.5 (−0.3)	36.1 (2.3)	45.7 (7.6)	55.0 (12.8)	64.6 (18.1)	74.1 (23.4)	78.7 (25.9)	77.3 (25.2)	69.5 (20.8)	57.6 (14.2)	45.4 (7.4)	35.0 (1.7)	55.9 (13.3)
Mean daily minimum °F (°C)	21.9 (−5.6)	25.6 (−3.6)	34.6 (1.4)	44.0 (6.7)	55.1 (12.8)	64.6 (18.1)	69.1 (20.6)	66.8 (19.3)	58.4 (14.7)	46.4 (8.0)	35.2 (1.8)	25.6 (−3.6)	45.6 (7.6)
Mean minimum °F (°C)	3.1 (−16.1)	8.3 (−13.2)	16.3 (−8.7)	28.0 (−2.2)	38.7 (3.7)	51.9 (11.1)	58.7 (14.8)	55.5 (13.1)	42.6 (5.9)	28.7 (−1.8)	17.7 (−7.9)	7.5 (−13.6)	−1.1 (−18.4)
Record low °F (°C)	−23 (−31)	−22 (−30)	−4 (−20)	14 (−10)	28 (−2)	44 (7)	48 (9)	45 (7)	30 (−1)	17 (−8)	1 (−17)	−17 (−27)	−23 (−31)
Average precipitation inches (mm)	1.52 (39)	1.73 (44)	2.80 (71)	4.42 (112)	7.09 (180)	5.29 (134)	4.68 (119)	4.46 (113)	4.79 (122)	3.87 (98)	2.19 (56)	1.81 (46)	44.65 (1,134)
Average snowfall inches (cm)	3.2 (8.1)	1.6 (4.1)	1.6 (4.1)	0.0 (0.0)	0.0 (0.0)	0.0 (0.0)	0.0 (0.0)	0.0 (0.0)	0.0 (0.0)	0.0 (0.0)	0.1 (0.25)	3.2 (8.1)	9.7 (24.65)
Average precipitation days (≥ 0.01 in)	4.3	5.2	7.2	8.4	9.7	8.3	6.3	7.4	6.2	7.0	4.4	4.8	79.2
Average snowy days (≥ 0.1 in)	1.8	1.4	0.6	0.0	0.0	0.0	0.0	0.0	0.0	0.0	0.1	1.3	5.2
Source 1: NOAA
Source 2: National Weather Service

== Demographics ==
Historical population
Census	Pop.	Note	%±
1880	887		—
1890	2,826		218.6%
1900	4,208		48.9%
1910	9,272		120.3%
1920	10,286		10.9%
1930	10,277		−0.1%
1940	10,142		−1.3%
1950	10,109		−0.3%
1960	10,849		7.3%
1970	10,341		−4.7%
1980	10,506		1.6%
1990	9,488		−9.7%
2000	9,411		−0.8%
2010	9,119		−3.1%
2020	8,722		−4.4%
2024 (est.)	8,468		−2.9%
U.S. Decennial Census; 2010-2020

=== 2020 census ===
As of the 2020 census, Chanute had a population of 8,722, with 3,530 households and 2,154 families. The population density was 1,228.8 inhabitants per square mile (474.4/km^{2}). There were 4,108 housing units at an average density of 578.8 per square mile (223.5/km^{2}).

The median age was 37.0 years. 25.7% of residents were under the age of 18, 10.1% were from 18 to 24, 23.5% were from 25 to 44, 22.3% were from 45 to 64, and 18.5% were 65 years of age or older. For every 100 females there were 94.4 males, and for every 100 females age 18 and over there were 91.2 males age 18 and over.

99.3% of residents lived in urban areas, while 0.7% lived in rural areas.

There were 3,530 households in Chanute, of which 31.2% had children under the age of 18 living in them. Of all households, 41.5% were married-couple households, 19.9% were households with a male householder and no spouse or partner present, and 30.0% were households with a female householder and no spouse or partner present. About 33.5% of all households were made up of individuals and 15.6% had someone living alone who was 65 years of age or older. The average household size was 2.3 and the average family size was 2.9.

There were 4,108 housing units, of which 14.1% were vacant. The homeowner vacancy rate was 2.0% and the rental vacancy rate was 14.4%.

Racial composition as of the 2020 census
Race	Number	Percent
White	7,538	86.4%
Black or African American	119	1.4%
American Indian and Alaska Native	101	1.2%
Asian	60	0.7%
Native Hawaiian and Other Pacific Islander	6	0.1%
Some other race	197	2.3%
Two or more races	701	8.0%
Hispanic or Latino (of any race)	707	8.1%

Non-Hispanic white residents made up 83.3% of the population.

=== Demographic estimates ===
The percent of those with a bachelor's degree or higher was estimated to be 11.5% of the population.

=== Income and poverty ===
The 2016–2020 5-year American Community Survey estimates show that the median household income was $45,238 (with a margin of error of +/- $7,522) and the median family income was $55,900 (+/- $10,730). Males had a median income of $36,138 (+/- $6,959) versus $22,187 (+/- $2,589) for females. The median income for those above 16 years old was $27,437 (+/- $2,787). Approximately, 17.1% of families and 19.5% of the population were below the poverty line, including 24.6% of those under the age of 18 and 8.6% of those ages 65 or over.

=== 2010 census ===
As of the census of 2010, there were 9,119 people, 3,720 households, and 2,322 families residing in the city. The population density was 1,297.2 inhabitants per square mile (500.9/km^{2}). There were 4,178 housing units at an average density of 594.3 per square mile (229.5/km^{2}). The racial makeup of the city was 92.4% White, 1.9% African American, 1.2% Native American, 0.8% Asian, 0.1% Pacific Islander, 1.4% from other races, and 2.2% from two or more races. Hispanic or Latino of any race were 5.4% of the population.

There were 3,720 households, of which 32.4% had children under the age of 18 living with them, 44.1% were married couples living together, 12.6% had a female householder with no husband present, 5.7% had a male householder with no wife present, and 37.6% were non-families. 33.1% of all households were made up of individuals, and 15.1% had someone living alone who was 65 years of age or older. The average household size was 2.35 and the average family size was 2.93.

The median age in the city was 37.2 years. 25.3% of residents were under the age of 18; 10.5% were between the ages of 18 and 24; 23% were from 25 to 44; 24.5% were from 45 to 64; and 16.8% were 65 years of age or older. The gender makeup of the city was 48.0% male and 52.0% female.

== Education ==
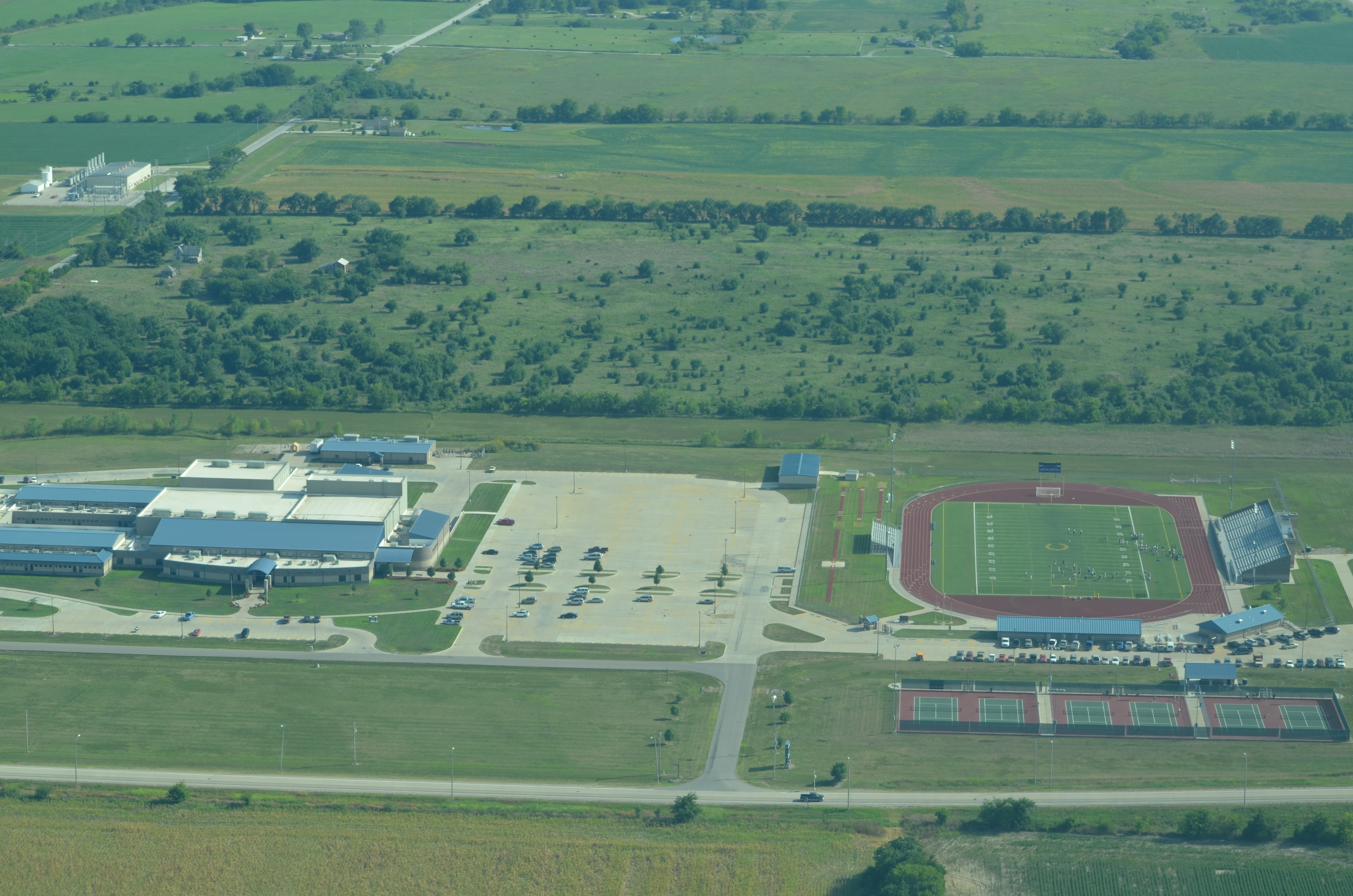
Aerial view of Chanute High School

=== Colleges ===
Neosho County Community College is a public, two-year institution, that currently provides post-secondary education for just under 3,200 students.

=== Primary and secondary ===
The community is served by Chanute USD 413 public school district, which includes one elementary school (Chanute Elementary), one middle school (Royster Middle), and one high school (Chanute High School). Chanute's public school system also includes Chanute High School-affiliated New Beginnings Academy, a program for students lacking credits to graduate and designed for individuals who have dropped out or are in danger of dropping out of high school. High school credits for New Beginnings Academy are provided by Chanute High School.

In 1961 Chanute had at least 5 elementary schools listed in the 1960-61 Kansas Educational Directory, Alcott, James B Hutton, Lincoln, Murray Hill and Roosevelt. Alcott was located at 500 North Forest in the northwest section of Chanute in the vicinity of Highland Park and is currently repurposed as a church. The front of James B. Hutton was located at 600 South Ashby and is currently repurposed as a church. Lincoln was located at Main and Allen. Murray Hill was located on 3rd Street bounded on the East by Garfield Avenue and is now listed in the National Register of Historic Places and is currently repurposed as a senior living home. Roosevelt was located at 1506 S Evergreen and has been repurposed as a single family home.

Chanute is home to two private schools: Saint Patrick Catholic School and Chanute Christian Academy. Saint Patrick Catholic School provides schooling for students from pre-school (ages three to four) through the sixth grade while Chanute Christian Academy (CCA) provides schooling for students from kindergarten through the twelfth grade. The Kansas State Department of Education (KSDE) recognizes Saint Patrick Catholic School as an accredited, non-public school. Chanute Christian Academy is not listed as an accredited school on the KSDE website.

== Area attractions ==
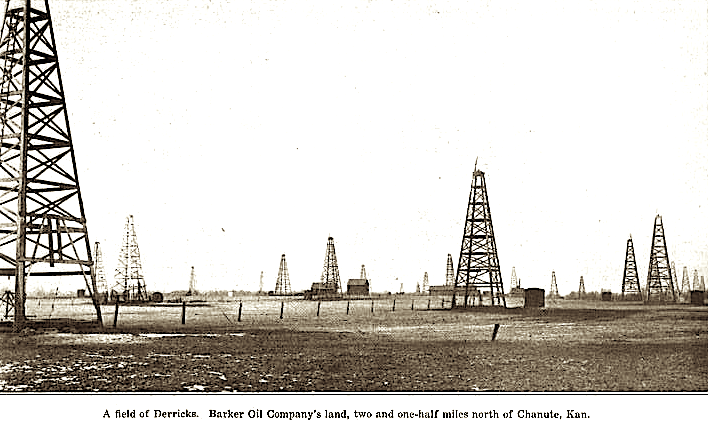
Oilfield near Chanute (1908)

The Chanute area has many tourist attractions known for their historical significance.

Martin and Osa Johnson Safari Museum

The Martin and Osa Johnson Safari Museum offers exhibits and programs that highlight the achievements of Martin and Osa Johnson, pioneering documentary filmmakers, photographers, authors, explorers, and Kansans. A trip to the museum allows one to relive the Johnsons' 1917–1936 adventures in Africa, Borneo and the South Seas. Additional exhibits feature the cultures and art of West Africa.

The Tioga Suites Hotel

The Tioga Suites Hotel, on the National Register of Historic Places listings in Neosho County, Kansas as the Tioga Inn, was built in 1929 boasting "modern fireproof construction" consisting of concrete framing, ceramic block fire walls, firehose connections on each floor, fire extinguishers and even "complete fire fighting apparatus" in the roof-top elevator penthouse. It is located on the northeast corner of Lincoln and Main Streets.

Chanute Art Gallery

The Chanute Art Gallery includes more than 1,500 square feet of exhibit area and houses a Permanent Core Collection of more than 500 works of art that includes 25 mediums, representing 135 artists. Special exhibits change every month. Collections include: The Luigi Kasimir Etchings, European and Oriental Art, The Kansas Prairie Printmakers and local and area artists.

Chanute Historical Museum

The Chanute Historical Museum, run by the Chanute Historical Society, is located south of the historic Santa Fe Railroad Depot in what is commonly known as the Flat Iron Building. Exhibits include a replica of Octave Chanute's 1896 biplane glider that was once displayed at the Smithsonian Institution in Washington, DC, historic artifacts from the Santa Fe Railroad and the Harvey House restaurant, and more.

Downtown & Historic Homes

Both the downtown and historic home districts offer a variety of architectural styles and examples of restoration. The James and Ella Truitt House, located at 305 N. Steuben Ave., was listed on the National Register of Historic Places listings in Neosho County, Kansas in 2014. Chanute also has several examples of WPA projects.

Cardinal Drug Store

The Cardinal Drug Store in downtown Chanute is the home of one of the oldest original soda fountains in Kansas. It has a collection of Coke memorabilia and medicine bottles. Cardinal is located at 103 East Main Street.

Austin Bridge

The King Bridge Company constructed the Austin Bridge in 1872. The 160-foot bowstring arch design spanned the Neosho River east of what is now Chanute. Local pioneers invested $15,000 in the bridge for their economic future of getting livestock and crops to the railhead. In 1910 the bridge was moved downstream to the community of Austin. In 1972 it was closed to vehicular traffic, remaining open to foot traffic. On September 15, 1977, the bridge was added to the National Register of Historic Places. In August 1999 the bridge was moved into Santa Fe Park to become the southern terminus of a 3.11 mile hike/bike path. A Federal grant, Neosho County and the City of Chanute funded the project.

Summit Hill Gardens

Summit Hill Gardens was the first school in Neosho County. Summit Hill was restored and a historic home and modern structure were added to the family residence. It has a flower and herb garden. It is located at 2605 160th Road.

Chanute–Wright Brothers Memorial

Located at 1 West Main, this sculpture was dedicated in September 2003 by the Chanute High School Class of 1941. The sculpture honors engineer and city namesake, Octave Chanute, a railroad designer who built the railroad through the community (now next to the memorial site), and whose work inspired the Wright Brothers. The replica sculpture of the Wright Brothers plane measures 23 feet from wing tip to wing tip and 20 feet from nose to tail. The project was in partnership with the City of Chanute.

== Transportation ==
=== Highways ===
Major highways running through Chanute are north–south route US-169 and east–west route K-39 (East-West). Chanute is also within 10 miles of two other major north–south highways: US-75 and US-59. These highways provide easy access to I-70 and I-35, the two Interstate highways passing through Kansas, as well as east–west highway US-400.

=== Bus ===
Bus service is provided northward towards Kansas City, Missouri and southward towards Tulsa, Oklahoma by Jefferson Lines (subcontractor of Greyhound Lines).

=== Railways ===
The South Kansas and Oklahoma Railroad (SKO) serves Chanute, as well as Southern and Eastern Kansas and Northern Oklahoma. The SKO connects to several major railroads allowing local businesses the opportunity to bid and negotiate their rail transportation costs to acquire the best possible price to all locations throughout North America.

=== Airports ===
Chanute Martin Johnson Airport (FAA Identifier: CNU) is a general aviation airport with a 4,255-foot runway and taxiway. Expansion of services and infrastructure is in the planning stages, including new T-hangars and pavement improvements.

== Infrastructure ==
In October 2014, the City of Chanute announced it planned to establish a municipal-operated broadband network, offering 1 Gigabit Internet connectivity for about US$70 per month. AT&T, which currently offers only 6 megabit DSL service (at a higher price), filed a petition with the Kansas Corporation Commission to intervene in the city's proposed offering, arguing it has the right to intervene since a 1947 law requires the commission to approve any bond issue the city would use to finance the construction. In April 2015, incoming city commissioners voted not to issue bonds and to temporarily halt the plans on municipal operated broadband, pending further public discussion and a public vote.

The city now owns its own electric power plant which has caused utilities to rise significantly in contrast to neighboring cities.

== Notable people ==
- Eden Ahbez (1908–1995), songwriter and mystic, lived in Chanute in his youth as George McGrew
- Jimmy Allen, former lead guitarist for Puddle of Mudd
- Gilbert Baker, gay rights activist, created the rainbow flag
- Edith Bideau, singer and music educator
- Edwin Bideau, lawyer and politician
- Armstead Grubb, professor of French and Spanish, head librarian, president of Lincoln University in Pennsylvania
- Osa Johnson, adventurer, author, and documentary filmmaker
- Jennifer Knapp, singer-songwriter
- Paul Lindblad, MLB pitcher for fourteen seasons
- Ralph Miller, basketball coach, Hall of Fame
- Grace Olive Wiley, herpetologist

== Gallery ==
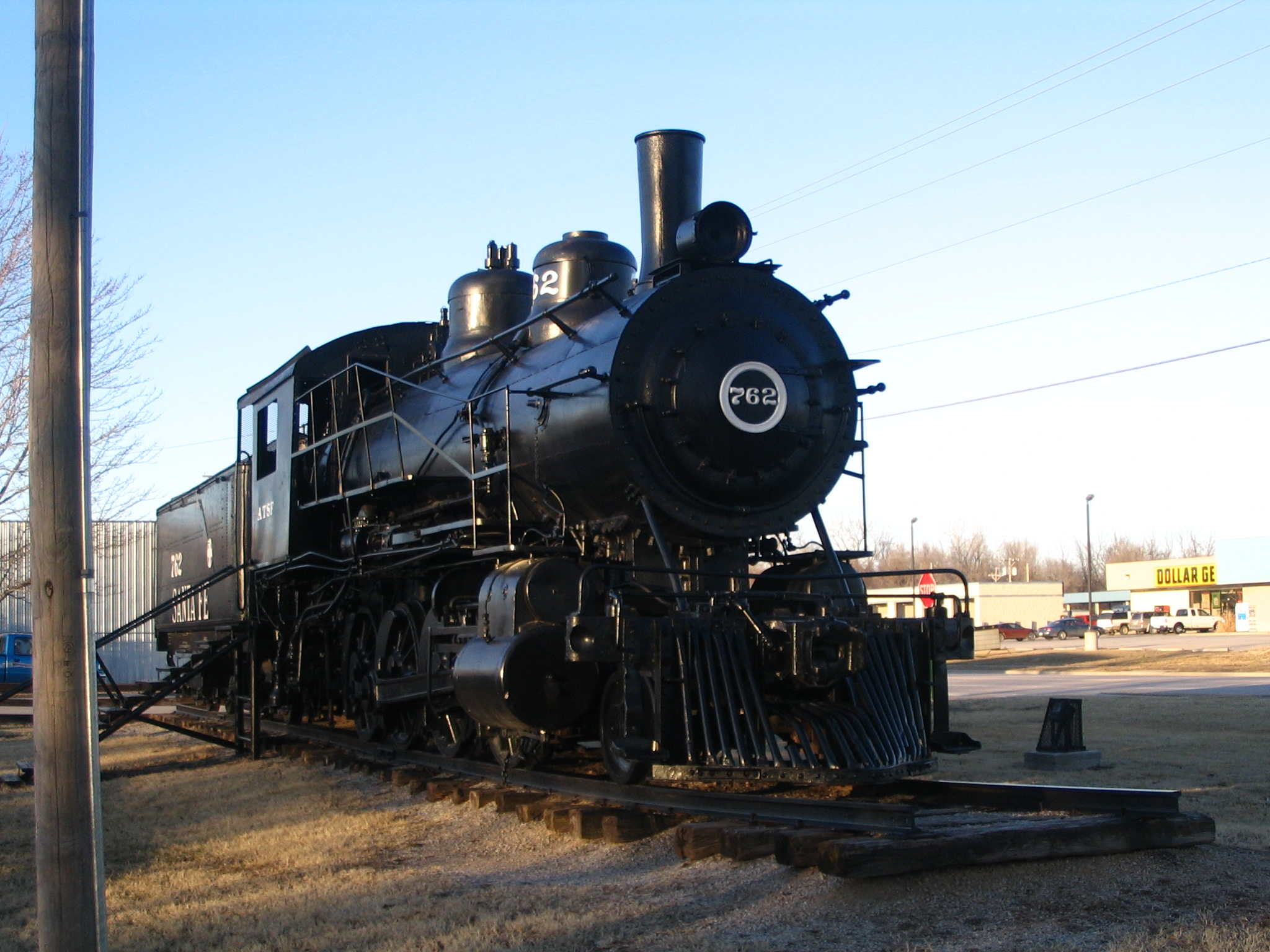
Steam locomotive in Santa Fe Park

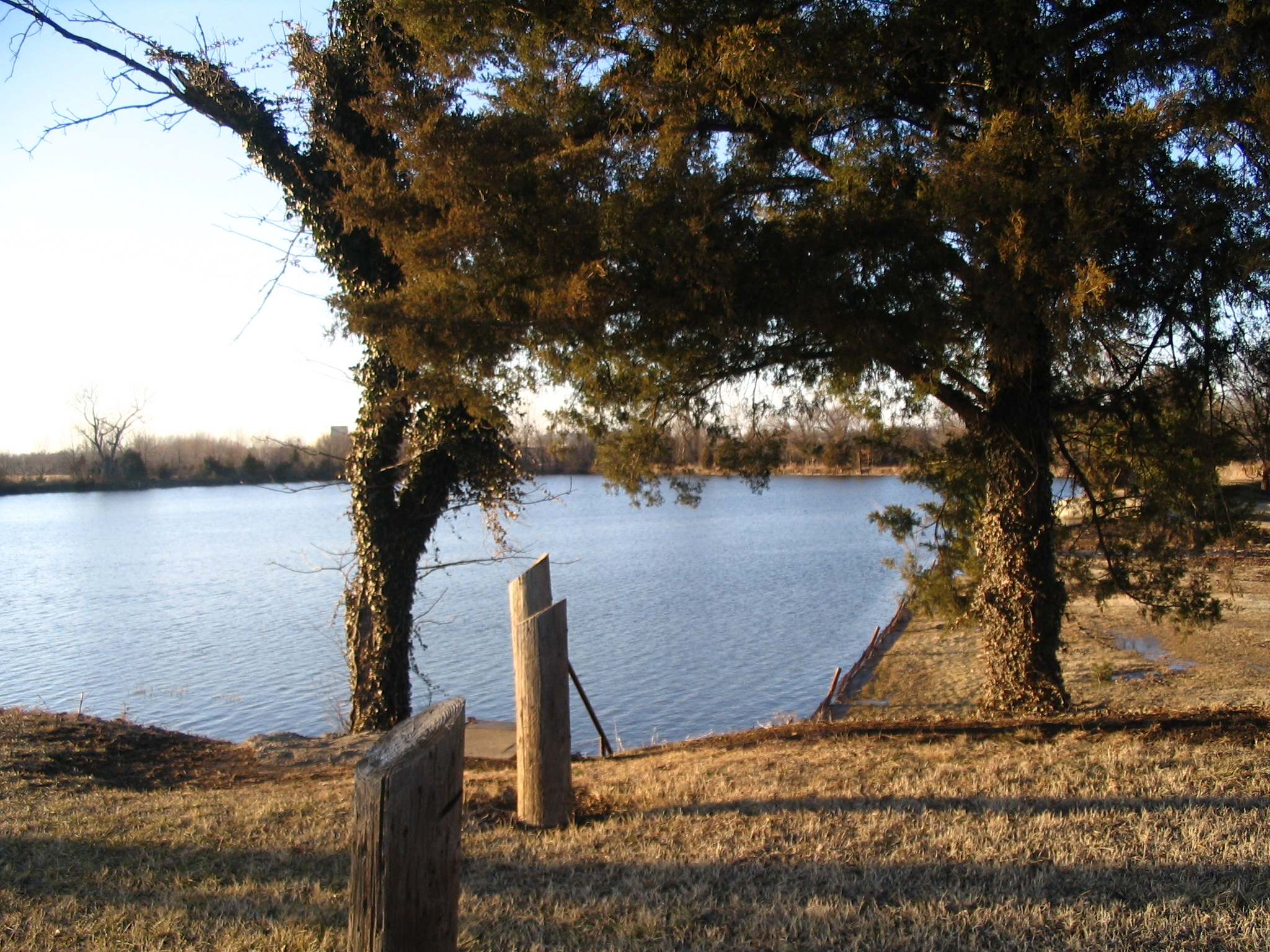
Lake in Santa Fe Park

== See also ==
- National Register of Historic Places listings in Neosho County, Kansas
- Great Flood of 1951
