= List of special routes of the United States Numbered Highway System =

United States Numbered Highway System
- Types of special routes in the U.S.

Highway names
- US Highways: U.S. Highway nn (US nn); U.S. Route nn (US nn)
- Special routes: Alternate U.S. Route nn (Alt. US nn); Business U.S. Route nn (Bus. US nn); Bypass U.S. Route nn (Byp. US nn); Connector U.S. Route nn (Conn. US nn); Scenic U.S. Route nn (Scenic US nn); Spur U.S. Route nn (Spur US nn); Temporary U.S. Route nn (Temp. US nn); Truck U.S. Route nn (Truck US nn)

System links
- United States Numbered Highway System; List; Special; Divided

A special route of the United States Numbered Highway System is a route that branches off a U.S. Highway in order to divert traffic from the main highway. Special routes are distinguished from main routes by, in most cases, the addition of an auxiliary plate that describes what type of route it is, while the main highway carries no such sign. In some locations, a single letter is placed after the route number to denote the special route type in lieu of the auxiliary plate.

There are four main types of special routes — alternate, business, bypass, and temporary; though other route types exist.

- Alternate routes exist where an additional road is needed to meet traffic demands. They are to be of equal character and quality compared to the main road.
- Business routes carry traffic through the central business district of a community while the main highway goes around the community.
- Bypasses serve the opposite purpose of business routes. Truck routes are a subset of bypasses.
- Temporary routes complete a gap between two segments of main highway that exists because the main highway has not been fully constructed.

A unique type of route in the U.S. Route system uses directional letter suffixes following the route number. These are known as divided U.S. Routes and are generally not considered to be special routes.

The following U.S. Highway special routes have existed:

- Routes are sorted by position along the main route, from south to north and west to east.
- Defunct routes are listed in italics.

== US 1 – US 101 ==
=== US 1 ===
- Bus. US 1 - Florida City to Homestead, Florida
- Alt. US 1 - Daytona Beach to St. Augustine, Florida
- Bus. US 1 - St. Augustine, Florida
- Alt. US 1 - Jacksonville, Florida
- Alt. US 1 - Jacksonville, Florida
- Bus. US 1 - Waycross, Georgia
- Bus. US 1 - Swainsboro, Georgia
- Bus. US 1 - Wadley, Georgia
- Bus. US 1 - Louisville, Georgia
- Conn. US 1 - Augusta, Georgia to North Augusta, South Carolina
- Truck US 1 - Aiken, South Carolina
- Conn. US 1 - Lexington, South Carolina
- Conn. US 1 - Columbia, South Carolina
- Truck US 1 - Camden, South Carolina
- Truck US 1 - Cheraw, South Carolina
- US 1A - Moore County, North Carolina
- US 1A - Southern Pines, North Carolina
- Bus. US 1 - Southern Pines, North Carolina
- Bus. US 1 - Vass to Cameron, North Carolina
- US 1A - Sanford, North Carolina
- Bus. US 1 - Sanford, North Carolina
- Byp. US 1 - Sanford, North Carolina
- US 1A - Cary to Raleigh, North Carolina
- US 1A - Raleigh, North Carolina
- US 1A - Raleigh, North Carolina
- Bus. US 1 - Raleigh, North Carolina
- Byp. US 1 - Raleigh, North Carolina
- US 1A - Wake Forest to Youngsville, North Carolina
- US 1A - Franklinton, North Carolina
- US 1A - Henderson, North Carolina
- Bus. US 1 - Henderson, North Carolina
- Byp. US 1 - Henderson, North Carolina
- Bus. US 1 - Fredericksburg, Virginia
- Truck US 1 - Alexandria, Virginia
- Byp. US 1 - Washington, D.C.
- Alt. US 1 - Washington, D.C. to Hyattsville, Maryland
- Alt. US 1 - Arbutus to Baltimore
- Bus. US 1 - Bel Air to Hickory, Maryland
- Alt. Truck US 1 - West Grove, Pennsylvania
- Byp. US 1 - Swarthmore to Hunting Park, Pennsylvania
- Alt. Truck US 1 - Philadelphia
- Bus. US 1 - Penndel, Pennsylvania
- Alt. US 1 - Trenton, New Jersey
- Bus. US 1 - Trenton, New Jersey
- Byp. US 1 - Trenton, New Jersey
- Temp. US 1 - Newark to Jersey City, New Jersey
- Truck US 1 - Newark to Jersey City, New Jersey, via Kearny
- Bus. US 1 - Jersey City, New Jersey to New York state line at New York City (now designated New Jersey Route 139 and an at-grade portion of Interstate 78)
- US 1A - Port Chester, New York
- US 1A - Stamford, Connecticut
- US 1A - Darien, Connecticut
- US 1A - Norwalk, Connecticut
- US 1A - Bridgeport, Connecticut
- US 1A - Milford, Connecticut
- US 1A - East Haven, Connecticut
- US 1A - Branford, Connecticut
- US 1A - Old Saybrook, Connecticut
- US 1A - Waterford, Connecticut
- US 1A - Groton, Connecticut
- US 1A - Stonington, Connecticut
- Bus. US 1 - Warwick, Rhode Island
- US 1A - Norwood, Rhode Island to Massachusetts state line at Attleboro, Massachusetts, via Providence, East Providence, and Pawtucket, Rhode Island
- Byp. US 1 - Portsmouth, New Hampshire to Kittery, Maine
- US 1A - York, Maine
- US 1A - Portland, Maine
- Bus. US 1 - Newcastle to Damariscotta, Maine
- US 1A - Rockland, Maine
- US 1A - Stockton Springs to Ellsworth, Maine, via Bangor
- Bus. US 1A - Bangor to Brewer, Maine
- Byp. US 1 - Rockland, Maine
- US 1A - Milbridge to Harrington, Maine
- US 1A - Whitneyville to Machias, Maine
- US 1A - Mars Hill to Presque Isle, Maine
- US 1A - Mars Hill to Van Buren, Maine
- Byp. US 1 - Caribou, Maine

=== US 2 ===
- Bus. US 2 - Cashmere, Washington
- Bus. US 2 - Wenatchee, Washington
- Bus. US 2 - Williston, North Dakota
- Bus. US 2 - Minot, North Dakota
- Byp. US 2 - Minot, North Dakota
- Bus. US 2 - Grand Forks, North Dakota to East Grand Forks, Minnesota
- Truck US 2 - Superior, Wisconsin
- Bus. US 2 - Ironwood, Michigan (used to exist in Hurley, Wisconsin)
- Bus. US 2 - Montpelier, Vermont
- Truck US 2 - St. Johnsbury, Vermont
- Alt. US 2 - Orono to Old Town, Maine
- Alt. US 2 - Macwahoc Plantation to Houlton, Maine

=== US 3 ===
- Alt. US 3 – Tyngsborough, Massachusetts to Concord, New Hampshire
- Bus. US 3 – Tyngsborough, Massachusetts to Concord, New Hampshire
- Byp. US 3 – Concord, New Hampshire
- Byp. US 3 – Nashua, New Hampshire
- Bus. US 3 – Belmont to Laconia, New Hampshire (Unsigned)

=== US 4 ===
- Alt. US 4 – Fair Haven to West Rutland, Vermont
- Bus. US 4 – Rutland, Vermont
- Alt. US 4 – Andover to Boscawen, New Hampshire
- Byp. US 4 – Concord, New Hampshire
- Alt. US 4 – East Northwood to Dover, New Hampshire

=== US 5 ===
- Alt. US 5 (1933–1941) – New Haven to North Haven, Connecticut
- Alt. US 5 (1941–1966) – New Haven to North Haven, Connecticut
- Alt. US 5 – New Haven to Meriden, Connecticut
- Alt. US 5 (1937–1941) – Lamentation Mountain State Park to Tracy, Connecticut
- Alt. US 5 (1940s–1950s) – Lamentation Mountain State Park to Tracy, Connecticut
- Alt. US 5 – Berlin, Connecticut
- Alt. US 5 – East Hartford to East Windsorhill, Connecticut
- US 5A – Hartford–Windsor, Connecticut city line to Agawam, Massachusetts
- Byp. US 5 – South Deerfield, Massachusetts
- Alt. US 5 – St. Johnsbury to St. Johnsbury Center, Vermont
- Alt. US 5 – Newport, Vermont
- Alt. US 5 – Derby Line, Vermont

=== US 6 ===
- Bus. US 6 – Ely, Nevada
- Spur US 6 – Ely, Nevada
- Temp. US 6 – Colton to Castle Gate, Utah
- Bus. US 6 – Helper, Utah
- Bus. US 6 – Price, Utah
- Bus. US 6 – Cisco, Utah
- Byp. US 6 – Grand Junction, Colorado
- Bus. US 6 - Hastings, Nebraska
- Bus. US 6 – Lincoln, Nebraska
- City US 6 – Lincoln, Nebraska
- City US 6 – Des Moines, Iowa
- City US 6 – Des Moines, Iowa
- Bus. US 6 – Davenport, Iowa
- City US 6 – Davenport, Iowa
- Temp. US 6 – Moline to Joliet, Illinois
- Bus. US 6 – Lansing, Illinois to Lake Station, Indiana
- Bus. US 6 – Bremen, Indiana
- Bus. US 6 – Napoleon, Ohio
- Alt. US 6 – Sandusky to Huron, Ohio
- Alt. US 6 – Rocky River to Cleveland, Ohio
- Alt. US 6 – Cleveland to East Cleveland, Ohio
- Alt. US 6 – Euclid to Chardon, Ohio
- Byp. US 6 – Union City, Pennsylvania
- Bus. US 6 – Warren, Pennsylvania
- Bus. US 6 – Tunkhannock Township to Tunkhannock, Pennsylvania
- Bus. US 6 – Scranton to Carbondale Township, Pennsylvania
- Alt. US 6 – Philipstown, New York
- Truck US 6 – Woodbury to Highlands, New York
- US 6A – Newtown to Southbury, Connecticut
- US 6A – Plymouth to Hartford, Connecticut
- US 6A – Woodbury to Willimantic, Connecticut
- US 6A – Coventry to Windham, Connecticut
- US 6A – Danielson, Connecticut
- Bus. US 6 – Scituate, Rhode Island
- Byp. US 6 – Scituate, Rhode Island
- Alt. US 6 – Johnston to Providence, Rhode Island
- Byp. US 6 – Johnston, Rhode Island
- Temp. US 6 – Marion to Wareham, Massachusetts
- Byp. US 6 – Bourne to Sagamore, Massachusetts
- Temp. US 6 – South Dennis to East Dennis, Massachusetts
- Temp. US 6 – Harwich to Brewster, Massachusetts

=== US 7 ===
- Alt. US 7 – Burlington, Vermont

=== US 8 ===
- Bus. US 8 – Rhinelander, Wisconsin

=== US 9 ===
- Truck US 9 – Georgetown, Delaware
- Bus. US 9 – Five Points to Lewes, Delaware
- Temp. US 9 – Upper Township to Somers Point, New Jersey
- Alt. US 9 – South Toms River to Toms River, New Jersey
- Alt. US 9 – Jersey City, New Jersey to Inwood Hill Park, New York
- Temp. US 9 – Newark to Jersey City, New Jersey
- Truck US 9 – Newark to Jersey City, New Jersey
- Bus. US 9 – Jersey City, New Jersey to New Jersey/New York state line at New York City
- Alt. US 9W – Newburgh, New York
- Alt. US 9 – Rouses Point, New York

=== US 10 ===
- Alt. US 10 – Seattle, Washington
- Alt. US 10 – Seattle, Washington to Missoula, Montana
- Bus. US 10 – Coeur d'Alene, Idaho
- Alt. US 10 – Drummond to Opportunity, Montana
- Byp. US 10 – Butte, Montana
- Byp. US 10S – Butte, Montana
- Byp. US 10 – Billings, Montana
- Bus. US 10 – Valley City, North Dakota
- Bus. US 10 – Neillsville, Wisconsin
- Bus. US 10 – Manitowoc, Wisconsin
- Bus. US 10 – Reed City, Michigan
- Bus. US 10 – Clare, Michigan
- Bus. US 10 – Midland, Michigan
- Bus. US 10 – Flint, Michigan
- Bus. US 10 – Pontiac, Michigan (replaced by Bus. US 24)

=== US 11 ===
- Bus. US 11 – Meridian, Mississippi
- Byp. US 11 – Tuscaloosa, Alabama
- Truck US 11 – Birmingham, Alabama
- Alt. US 11 – Chattanooga, Tennessee
- Bus. US 11 – Chattanooga, Tennessee
- Byp. US 11 – Chattanooga, Tennessee
- Byp. US 11 – Cleveland, Tennessee
- Bus. US 11 – Riceville to Athens, Tennessee
- Bus. US 11E – Greeneville, Tennessee
- Truck US 11 – Bristol, Virginia
- Alt. US 11 – Salem to Roanoke, Virginia
- Bus. US 11 – Lexington, Virginia
- Byp. US 11 – Lexington, Virginia
- Bus. US 11 – Staunton, Virginia
- Truck US 11 – Staunton, Virginia
- Alt. US 11 – Winchester, Virginia
- Byp. US 11 – Lemoyne, Pennsylvania
- Alt. US 11 – Lemoyne, Pennsylvania

=== US 12 ===
- Bus. US 12 – Walla Walla, Washington
- Bus. US 12 – Missoula, Montana
- Bus. US 12 – Helena, Montana
- Byp. US 12 – Helena, Montana
- Temp. US 12 – Fallon to Ismay, Montana
- Bus. US 12 – Eau Claire, Wisconsin
- City US 12 – Eau Claire, Wisconsin
- Bus. US 12 – Lake Delton to West Baraboo, Wisconsin
- Bus. US 12 – Sauk City to Prairie du Sac, Wisconsin
- City US 12 – Madison, Wisconsin
- Bus. US 12 - Madison, Wisconsin
- Byp. US 12 - Madison, Wisconsin
- Bus. US 12 – Fort Atkinson, Wisconsin
- Bus. US 12 – Whitewater, Wisconsin
- Temp. US 12 – Big Foot to Crystal Lake, Illinois
- Bus. US 12 – Des Plaines to Chicago
- City US 12 – Des Plaines to Chicago, Illinois
- Toll US 12 – Chicago, Illinois to Hammond, Indiana
- Bus. US 12 – Niles, Michigan
- Alt. US 12 – Kalamazoo, Michigan
- Bus. US 12 – Kalamazoo, Michigan
- Alt. US 12 – Battle Creek to Springfield, Michigan
- Bus. US 12 – Battle Creek, Michigan
- Bus. US 12 – Marshall, Michigan
- Bus. US 12 – Albion, Michigan
- Bus. US 12 – Jackson, Michigan
- Bus. US 12 – Ypsilanti, Michigan

=== US 13 ===
- Alt. US 13 – Bethel to Williamston, North Carolina
- Bus. US 13 – Bethel, North Carolina
- US 13A – Windsor, North Carolina
- Bus. US 13 – Windsor, North Carolina
- Bus. US 13 – Suffolk, Virginia
- Spur US 13 – Norfolk, Virginia
- Bus. US 13 – Cape Junction to Cheriton, Virginia
- Byp. US 13 – Cheriton, Virginia
- Bus. US 13 – Eastville, Virginia
- Byp. US 13 – Eastville, Virginia
- Bus. US 13 – Exmore, Virginia
- Byp. US 13 – Exmore, Virginia
- Bus. US 13 – Onley to Accomac, Virginia
- Byp. US 13 – Tasley, Virginia
- Byp. US 13 – Accomac, Virginia
- Bus. US 13 – Pocomoke City, Maryland
- Bus. US 13 – Fruitland to Salisbury, Maryland
- Alt. US 13 – Delmar to Seaford, Delaware
- Bus. US 13 – Bridgeville, Delaware
- Alt. US 13 – Bridgeville, Delaware
- Alt. US 13 – Woodside to Camden, Delaware
- Alt. US 13 – Rodney Village to Dover, Delaware
- Bus. US 13 – Wilmington, Delaware
- Alt. US 13 – Wilmington to Claymont, Delaware
- Byp. US 13 – Claymont, Delaware to Chester, Pennsylvania
- Bus. US 13 - Trainer to Chester, Pennsylvania
- Byp. US 13 – Chester to Collingdale, Pennsylvania
- Byp. US 13 – Darby to Hunting Park, Pennsylvania
- Alt. Truck US 13 – Bensalem Township, Pennsylvania

=== US 14 ===
- Alt. US 14 – Cody to Burgess Junction, Wyoming
- Bus. US 14 – Sheridan, Wyoming
- US 14A – Spearfish to Sturgis, South Dakota
- Bus. US 14 – Rapid City, South Dakota
- Truck US 14 - Pierre, South Dakota
- Bus. US 14 - Huron, South Dakota
- Byp. US 14 – Brookings, South Dakota
- Bus. US 14 – Dodge Center, Minnesota
- Bus. US 14 – Madison, Wisconsin
- City US 14 – Madison, Wisconsin
- Bus. US 14 – Janesville, Wisconsin
- City US 14 – Janesville, Wisconsin
- Bus. US 14 – Woodstock, Illinois

=== US 15 ===
- Alt. US 15/US 15A – Walterboro, South Carolina to Creedmoor, North Carolina
- Conn. US 15 – Santee, South Carolina
- Conn. US 15 – Summerton, South Carolina
- Conn. US 15 – Sumter to East Sumter, South Carolina
- Alt. US 15 – Sumter to Society Hill, South Carolina
- Alt. US 15 – Dubose to Manville, South Carolina
- Alt. US 15 – Hartsville, South Carolina
- Bus. US 15 – Hartsville, South Carolina
- Truck US 15 – Hartsville, South Carolina
- Bus. US 15 – Bennettsville, South Carolina
- Bus. US 15 – Laurinburg, North Carolina
- US 15A – Sanford, North Carolina
- Bus. US 15 – Sanford, North Carolina
- Byp. US 15 – Sanford, North Carolina
- US 15A – Chapel Hill, North Carolina
- Bus. US 15 – Chapel Hill, North Carolina
- Bus. US 15 – Durham, North Carolina
- Byp. US 15 – Durham, North Carolina
- Truck US 15 – Oxford, North Carolina
- Bus. US 15 – Clarksville, Virginia
- Bus. US 15 – Keysville, Virginia
- Bus. US 15 – Farmville, Virginia
- Alt. US 15 - Farmville, Virginia
- Bus. US 15 – Culpeper, Virginia
- Bus. US 15 – Remington, Virginia
- Bus. US 15 – Warrenton, Virginia
- Temp. US 15 – Warrenton to Aldie, Virginia
- Bus. US 15 – Leesburg, Virginia
- Byp. US 15 – Leesburg, Virginia
- Bus. US 15 – Emmitsburg, Maryland
- Bus. US 15 – Gettysburg, Pennsylvania
- Bus. US 15 - Shamokin Dam, Pennsylvania
- Bus. US 15 – Mansfield, Pennsylvania

=== US 16 ===
- Bus. US 16 - Newcastle, Wyoming
- Truck US 16 - Newcastle, Wyoming
- US 16A – Custer to Keystone, South Dakota
- US 16A – Custer to Keystone, South Dakota
- Byp. US 16 – Hill City, South Dakota
- Truck US 16 - Hill City, South Dakota
- Bus. US 16 – Rapid City, South Dakota
- Byp. US 16 – Rapid City, South Dakota
- Truck US 16 - Rapid City, South Dakota
- Alt. US 16 – Wall to Kadoka, South Dakota
- Bus. US 16 – Watertown, Wisconsin
- Bus. US 16 – Grand Rapids, Michigan
- Byp. US 16 – Grand Rapids, Michigan
- US 16A – Novi to Farmington, Michigan
- Bus. US 16 – Farmington, Michigan

=== US 17 ===
- Truck US 17 – Kissimmee, Florida
- Truck US 17 – Winter Park to Maitland, Florida
- Alt. US 17 – Jacksonville, Florida
- Alt. US 17 – Jacksonville, Florida
- Alt. US 17 – Savannah, Georgia
- Alt. US 17 – Savannah, Georgia to near Limehouse, South Carolina
- Alt. US 17 – Ridgeland, South Carolina
- Alt. US 17 – near Pocotaligo to Georgetown, South Carolina
- Alt. US 17 – Yemassee, South Carolina
- Conn. US 17 – Yemassee, South Carolina
- Alt. US 17 – Rantowles to Parkers Ferry, South Carolina
- Alt. US 17 – Ridgeville, South Carolina
- Alt. Truck US 17 – Summerville, South Carolina
- Alt. US 17 – Charleston, South Carolina
- Bus. US 17 – Mount Pleasant, South Carolina
- Alt. US 17 – Myrtle Beach, South Carolina
- Conn. US 17 – Murrells Inlet to Garden City, South Carolina
- Bus. US 17 – Myrtle Beach, South Carolina
- Byp. US 17 – Myrtle Beach, South Carolina
- Bus. US 17 – Shallotte, North Carolina
- Bus. US 17 – Bolivia, North Carolina
- US 17-1 – North Carolina to Virginia
- Bus. US 17 – Wilmington, North Carolina
- Truck US 17 – Wilmington, North Carolina
- Byp. US 17 - Hampstead, North Carolina
- Bus. US 17 – Jacksonville, North Carolina
- Bus. US 17 – New Bern, North Carolina
- Bus. US 17 – Vanceboro, North Carolina
- Bus. US 17 – Chocowinity to Washington, North Carolina
- Byp. US 17 – Washington, North Carolina
- Alt. US 17 – Williamston, North Carolina
- Bus. US 17 – Williamston, North Carolina
- Alt. US 17 – Windsor, North Carolina
- Byp. US 17 – Windsor, North Carolina
- Bus. US 17 – Edenton, North Carolina
- Bus. US 17 – Hertford to Winfall, North Carolina
- Alt. US 17 – Elizabeth City, North Carolina
- Bus. US 17 – Elizabeth City, North Carolina
- Bus. Truck US 17 - Elizabeth City, North Carolina
- Byp. US 17 – Elizabeth City, North Carolina
- Bus. Truck US 17 – Elizabeth City, North Carolina
- Bus. US 17 – South Mills, North Carolina
- Bus. US 17 – Chesapeake, Virginia
- Bus. US 17 – Portsmouth, Virginia
- Bus. US 17 – Gloucester Courthouse, Virginia
- Bus. US 17 – Saluda, Virginia
- Bus. US 17 – Fredericksburg, Virginia
- Byp. US 17 – Fredericksburg, Virginia
- Bus. US 17 – Warrenton, Virginia
- Bus. US 17 – Marshall, Virginia

=== US 18 ===
- Byp. US 18 – Hot Springs, South Dakota
- Truck US 18 – Hot Springs, South Dakota
- Bus. US 18 – Clear Lake, Iowa to Mason City, Iowa
- Bus. US 18 – Mendon Township to Marquette, Iowa
- Bus. US 18 – Mount Horeb, Wisconsin
- Bus. US 18 – Verona, Wisconsin
- Alt. US 18 – Milwaukee, Wisconsin

=== US 19 ===
- Alt. US 19 – Bayonet Point to Brooksville, Florida
- Alt. US 19 – St. Petersburg to Holiday, Florida
- Bus. US 19 – Thomasville to Meigs, Georgia
- Bus. US 19 – Albany, Georgia
- Byp. US 19 – Leesburg, Georgia
- Bus. US 19 – Griffin, Georgia
- Bus. US 19 – Southeast of Hapeville to Atlanta, Georgia
- Bus. US 19 – Dahlonega, Georgia
- Bus. US 19 – Murphy, North Carolina
- Bus. US 19 – Andrews, North Carolina
- Truck US 19 – Bryson City to Lake Junaluska, North Carolina
- Conn. US 19 – Bryson City, North Carolina
- US 19A – Waynesville, North Carolina
- US 19A – Ela to Lake Junaluska, North Carolina
- US 19A – Bryson City to Lake Junaluska, North Carolina
- Byp. US 19 – Bryson City to Lake Junaluska, North Carolina
- US 19A – Asheville, North Carolina
- Bus. US 19 – Asheville, North Carolina
- Bus. US 19 – Woodfin to Weaverville, North Carolina
- US 19A – Cane River to Elk Park, North Carolina
- Truck US 19 – Bristol, Virginia
- Bus. US 19 – Lebanon, Virginia
- Bus. US 19 – Tazewell, Virginia
- Alt. US 19 - Prosperity, West Virginia
- Spur US 19 - Fairmont, West Virginia
- Bus. US 19 – Beckley, West Virginia
- Truck US 19 – Mt. Lebanon to Wexford, Pennsylvania, via Pittsburgh
- Truck US 19 - Harlansburg, Pennsylvania

=== US 20 ===
- Bus. US 20 - Toledo, Oregon
- Bus. US 20 - Bend, Oregon
- Temp. US 20 - Mountain Home to Carey, Idaho
- Bus. US 20 - Idaho Falls, Idaho
- Bus. US 20 - Rigby, Idaho
- Alt. US 20 - Sugar City, Idaho to Jackson, Wyoming
- Bus. US 20 - St. Anthony, Idaho
- Bus. US 20 - Mountain View to Casper, Wyoming
- Byp. US 20 - Mountain View to Casper, Wyoming
- Bus. US 20 - Douglas, Wyoming
- Byp. US 20 - Manville, Wyoming
- Bus. US 20 - South Sioux City, Nebraska to Sioux City, Iowa
- Bus. US 20 - Fort Dodge, Iowa
- Bus. US 20 - Freeport, Illinois
- Bus. US 20 - Rockford to Belvidere, Illinois
- Bus. US 20 - Elgin, Illinois
- City US 20 - Elmhurst to Chicago
- Bus. US 20 - Melrose Park to Chicago, Illinois
- Toll Bus. US 20 - Chicago, Illinois to Hammond, Indiana
- Alt. US 20 - Tremont to Michigan City, Indiana
- Bus. US 20 - South Bend to Mishawaka, Indiana
- Byp. US 20 - South Bend to Elkhart, Indiana
- Truck US 20 - Osceola to Elkhart, Indiana
- US 20A - northwest of Holiday City to Maumee, Ohio (originally US 20S)
- Bus. US 20 - Toledo to Gibsonburg Junction, Ohio
- Truck US 20 - Perrysburg, Ohio
- Bus. US 20 - Fremont, Ohio
- US 20A - Rocky River to Cleveland, Ohio
- US 20A - Cleveland to East Cleveland, Ohio
- Truck US 20 - Silver Creek, New York
- US 20A - Big Tree to South Bloomfield, New York
- Byp. US 20 - Lenox, Massachusetts

=== US 21 ===
- Bus. US 21 - Beaufort, South Carolina
- Alt. US 21 - Yemassee, South Carolina
- Alt. US 21 - Rowesville, South Carolina
- Alt. US 21 - Orangeburg, South Carolina
- Bus. US 21 - Orangeburg, South Carolina
- Bus. US 21 - Orangeburg, South Carolina
- Byp. US 21 - Orangeburg, South Carolina
- Conn. US 21 - Orangeburg, South Carolina
- Spur US 21 - Orangeburg, South Carolina
- Conn. US 21 - West Columbia, South Carolina
- Conn. US 21 - Columbia, South Carolina
- Spur US 21 - Columbia, South Carolina
- Alt. US 21 - Ridgeway, South Carolina
- Conn. US 21 - Ridgeway, South Carolina
- Bus. US 21 - Fort Mill, South Carolina
- Alt. US 21 - Rock Hill, South Carolina
- Bus. US 21 - Rock Hill, South Carolina
- Bus. US 21 - Rock Hill to Fort Mill, South Carolina
- Bus. US 21 - Jonesville to Elkin, North Carolina
- Truck US 21 - Sparta, North Carolina
- Byp. US 21 - Bluefield, West Virginia
- Temp. US 21 - Cuyahoga Heights to Cleveland, Ohio

=== US 22 ===
- Temp. US 22 - Green Tree to Pittsburgh, Pennsylvania
- Truck US 22 - Pittsburgh, Pennsylvania
- Bus. US 22 - Churchill to Monroeville, Pennsylvania
- Bus. US 22 - Granville Township to Derry Township
- Byp. US 22 - Harrisburg, Pennsylvania
- Alt. US 22 - Bethlehem to Easton, Pennsylvania
- Alt. US 22 - Phillipsburg, New Jersey
- Byp. US 22 - Easton, Pennsylvania to Phillipsburg, New Jersey

=== US 23 ===
- Bus. US 23 - Waycross, Georgia
- Bus. US 23 - Hazlehurst, Georgia
- Bus. US 23 - Cochran, Georgia
- Bus. US 23 - Baldwin to Cornelia, Georgia
- Bus. US 23 - Dillsboro to east of Sylva, North Carolina
- Bus. US 23 - Hazelwood to Waynesville, North Carolina
- Alt. US 23 - Waynesville, North Carolina
- Alt. US 23 - Clyde to Canton, North Carolina
- Alt. US 23 - Asheville, North Carolina
- Bus. US 23 - Asheville, North Carolina
- Bus. US 23 - Weaverville, North Carolina
- US 23A - Wolf Laurel, North Carolina
- Bus. US 23 - Gate City, Virginia
- Bus. US 23 - Big Stone Gap to Norton, Virginia, via Appalachia
- Bus. US 23 - Wise, Virginia
- Bus. US 23 - Pound, Virginia
- Byp. US 23 - Pound, Virginia
- Bus. US 23 - Pikeville, Kentucky
- Byp. US 23 - Pikeville, Kentucky
- Spur US 23 - Pikeville, Kentucky
- Bus. US 23 - Paintsville, Kentucky
- Bus. US 23 - Ashland, Kentucky
- Spur US 23 - Ashland, Kentucky
- Truck US 23 - South Portsmouth, Kentucky to Portsmouth, Ohio
- Bus. US 23 - Chillicothe, Ohio
- Bus. US 23 - Perrysburg to Toledo, Ohio
- Bus. US 23 - Ann Arbor, Michigan
- Bus. US 23 - Fenton, Michigan
- Bus. US 23 - Bridgeport to Saginaw, Michigan
- Bus. US 23 - Bay City, Michigan
- Bus. US 23 - Rogers City, Michigan

=== US 24 ===
- Bus. US 24 – Manitou Springs to Colorado Springs, Colorado
- Bus. US 24 – Goodland, Kansas
- Opt. US 24 – Kansas City to Independence, Missouri
- Bus. US 24 – Napoleon to Lexington, Missouri
- Bus. US 24 – Carrollton, Missouri
- City US 24 – Kirksville, Missouri
- Bus. US 24 – Paris, Missouri
- Bus. US 24 – Washington, Illinois
- Bus. US 24 – Logansport to Richvalley, Indiana
- Bus. US 24 – Peru, Indiana
- Bus. US 24 – Wabash, Indiana
- Truck US 24 – Fort Wayne, Indiana
- Alt. US 24 – Toledo, Ohio to Erie, Michigan (Originally Alt. US 25)
- Bus. US 24 – Perrysburg to Toledo, Ohio
- US 24A - southwest of Luna Pier to Erie, Michigan
- Bus. US 24 – Pontiac, Michigan

=== US 25 ===
- Byp. US 25 - Statesboro, Georgia
- Byp. US 25 - Waynesboro, Georgia
- Bus. US 25 - Augusta, Georgia to North Augusta, South Carolina
- Bus. US 25 - Augusta, Georgia to North Augusta, South Carolina
- Conn. US 25 - North Augusta, South Carolina
- Truck US 25 - North Augusta, South Carolina
- Alt. US 25 - Edgefield, South Carolina
- Bus. US 25 - Edgefield, South Carolina
- Truck US 25 - Edgefield, South Carolina
- Bus. US 25 - Greenwood, South Carolina
- Alt. US 25 - Hodges, South Carolina
- Bus. US 25 - Ware Shoals, South Carolina
- Bus. US 25 - Greenville, South Carolina
- Alt. US 25 - Greenville to near Travelers Rest, South Carolina
- Conn. US 25 - Travelers Rest, South Carolina
- Bus. US 25 - Flat Rock, North Carolina – Hendersonville, North Carolina
- US 25A - Hendersonville, North Carolina
- US 25A - Arden to Asheville, North Carolina
- Bus. US 25 - Marshall, North Carolina
- Truck US 25 - Corbin, Kentucky
- Bus. US 25 - Richmond, Kentucky
- Bus. US 25 - Lexington, Kentucky
- Truck US 25 - Lexington, Kentucky
- Bus. US 25 - Williamstown to Dry Ridge, Kentucky
- Bus. US 25 - Covington, Kentucky
- Bus. US 25 - Perrysburg to Toledo, Ohio
- Alt. US 25 - Toledo, Ohio to Erie, Michigan
- Bus. US 25 - Toledo, Ohio
- US 25A - Erie, Michigan
- US 25A - Port Huron, Michigan
- Bus. US 25 - Port Huron, Michigan

=== US 26 ===
- Bus. US 26 – Ririe, Idaho
- Bus. US 26 – Mountain View to Casper, Wyoming
- Byp. US 26 – Mountain View to Casper, Wyoming
- Bus. US 26 – Douglas, Wyoming
- City US 26 – Scottsbluff, Nebraska

=== US 27 ===
- Alt. US 27 - Sebring to Avon Park, Florida
- Temp. US 27 - Sebring to Leesburg, Florida
- Alt. US 27 - Lady Lake to Belleview, Florida
- Alt. US 27 - Haines City to Sunray Deli Estates, Florida
- Alt. US 27 - Williston to Perry, Florida
- Bus. US 27 - Attapulgus, Georgia
- Bus. US 27 - Bainbridge, Georgia
- Bus. US 27 - Blakely, Georgia
- Bus. US 27 - Cuthbert, Georgia
- Alt. US 27 - Columbus to Carrollton, Georgia
- Bus. US 27 - Bremen, Georgia
- Bus. US 27 - Buchanan, Georgia
- Bus. US 27 - Cedartown, Georgia
- Bus. US 27 - LaFayette, Georgia
- Bus. US 27 - Chattanooga, Tennessee
- Bus. US 27 - Dayton, Tennessee
- Bus. US 27 - Nicholasville, Kentucky
- Bus. US 27 - Cynthiana, Kentucky
- Conn. US 27 - Cynthiana, Kentucky
- City US 27 - Newport, Kentucky to Cincinnati
- Temp. US 27 - Newport, Kentucky to Cincinnati, Ohio
- Truck US 27 - Cincinnati, Ohio
- Truck US 27 - Fort Wayne, Indiana
- Bus. US 27 - Marshall, Michigan
- Bus. US 27 - Charlotte, Michigan
- Bus. US 27 - Lansing, Michigan
- Truck US 27 - Lansing, Michigan
- Bus. US 27 - St. Johns, Michigan
- Bus. US 27 - Ithaca, Michigan
- US 27A - Alma, Michigan
- Bus. US 27 - Alma, Michigan
- Bus. US 27 - St. Louis, Michigan
- Bus. US 27 - Mount Pleasant, Michigan
- Bus. US 27 - Clare, Michigan
- Bus. US 27 - Harrison, Michigan

=== US 29 ===
- Truck US 29 - Union Springs, Alabama
- Bus. US 29 - LaGrange, Georgia
- Alt. US 29 - Palmetto to Red Oak, Georgia
- Bus. US 29 - Decatur, Georgia
- Bus. US 29 - Lawrenceville to Winder, Georgia
- Bus. US 29 - Lawrenceville to Athens, Georgia
- Temp. US 29 - Athens, Georgia
- Alt. US 29 - Anderson, South Carolina
- Bus. US 29 - Anderson, South Carolina
- Conn. US 29 - Williamston, South Carolina
- Alt. US 29 - Greenville, South Carolina
- Bus. US 29 - Greenville, South Carolina
- Conn. US 29 - Greenville, South Carolina
- Spur US 29 - Greenville, South Carolina
- Alt. US 29 - Greenville to Taylors, South Carolina
- Alt. US 29 - Greenville to Taylors, South Carolina
- Conn. US 29 - Greenville to Wade Hampton, South Carolina
- Alt. US 29 - Wellford, South Carolina
- Alt. US 29 - Lyman to North Carolina state line northeast of Blacksburg, South Carolina
- Alt. US 29 - Fairforest, South Carolina
- Conn. US 29 - Spartanburg, South Carolina
- US 29A - Bessemer City, North Carolina
- Bus. US 29 - Charlotte, North Carolina
- Alt. US 29 - Concord to China Grove, North Carolina
- US 29A (1938–1940) - Kannapolis, North Carolina
- US 29A (1940–1948) - Kannapolis, North Carolina
- US 29A (1948–1997) - Kannapolis, North Carolina
- US 29A - Salisbury, North Carolina
- Bus. US 29 - Salisbury, North Carolina
- US 29A - Lexington, North Carolina
- Bus. US 29 - Lexington, North Carolina
- US 29A - Thomasville, North Carolina
- Bus. US 29 - Thomasville, North Carolina
- US 29A (1934–1948) - High Point, North Carolina
- US 29A (1948–1991) - High Point to Greensboro, North Carolina
- US 29A - Greensboro, North Carolina
- Bus. US 29 - Monticello to Ruffin, North Carolina, via Reidsville
- US 29A - Reidsville, North Carolina
- Bus. US 29 (1960–73) - Reidsville, North Carolina
- Bus. US 29 - Pelham, North Carolina to Danville, Virginia
- Alt. US 29 (1936–1941) - Danville, Virginia
- Alt. US 29 (1941–1970) - Danville, Virginia
- Bus. US 29 (1970–1998) - Danville, Virginia
- Bus. US 29 (1996–) - Danville, Virginia to Blairs, Virginia
- Bus. US 29 - Chatham, Virginia
- Bus. US 29 - Gretna, Virginia
- Bus. US 29 - Hurt, Virginia to Altavista, Virginia
- Alt. US 29 - Lynchburg, Virginia
- Bus. US 29 (1971–2005) - Lynchburg, Virginia
- Bus. US 29 (1969–) - Lynchburg to Amherst, Virginia
- Bus. US 29 - Lovingston, Virginia
- Bus. US 29 - Charlottesville, Virginia
- Bus. US 29 - Madison, Virginia
- Bus. US 29 - Culpeper, Virginia
- Bus. US 29 - Remington, Virginia
- Bus. US 29 - Warrenton, Virginia

=== US 30 ===
- Bus. US 30 - St. Helens, Oregon
- Alt. US 30 - Portland, Oregon
- Bus. US 30 - Portland, Oregon
- Byp. US 30 - Portland, Oregon
- Bus. US 30 - Huntington, Oregon
- Bus. US 30 - Ontario, Oregon
- Bus. US 30 - Pocatello, Idaho
- Bus. US 30N - Pocatello, Idaho
- Bus. US 30 - Lava Hot Springs, Idaho
- Byp. US 30 - Kemmerer to Diamondville, Wyoming
- Bus. US 30 - Green River, Wyoming
- Bus. US 30 - Rock Springs, Wyoming
- Bus. US 30 - Rawlins, Wyoming
- Bus. US 30 - Pine Bluffs, Wyoming to Bushnell, Nebraska
- US 30A - Clarks, Nebraska to Missouri Valley, Iowa
- Bus. US 30 - Wahoo, Nebraska
- City US 30 - Wahoo, Nebraska
- City US 30A - Wahoo, Nebraska
- Bus. US 30 - Fremont, Nebraska
- Alt. US 30 - Clarks, Nebraska to Missouri Valley, Iowa
- Alt. US 30 - Ogden to Marshalltown, Iowa
- Bus. US 30 - Marshalltown, Iowa
- Bus. US 30 - Toledo to Tama, Iowa
- Emergency US 30 - Cedar Rapids, Iowa
- Alt. US 30 - Clinton, Iowa to Fulton, Illinois
- Alt. US 30 - Sterling to Chicago, Illinois
- Toll US 30 - Aurora to Ford Heights, Illinois
- Bus. US 30 - Aurora, Illinois
- City US 30 - Aurora, Illinois
- Bus. US 30 - Fort Wayne, Indiana
- Bus. US 30 - Van Wert, Ohio
- Bus. US 30 - Upper Sandusky, Ohio
- Bus. US 30 - Bucyrus, Ohio
- Alt. US 30 - Dalton, Ohio
- Truck US 30 - Clinton to Robinson Township, Pennsylvania
- Temp. US 30 - Green Tree to Pittsburgh
- Bus. US 30 - Bedford, Pennsylvania
- Bus. US 30 - Everett, Pennsylvania
- Bus. US 30 - Frazer to Parkesburg, Pennsylvania
- Bus. Alt. Truck US 30 - Downingtown, Pennsylvania
- Alt. US 30 - Bryn Mawr to Philadelphia, Pennsylvania
- Byp. US 30 - Bryn Mawr to Philadelphia, Pennsylvania

=== US 31 ===
- Bus. US 31 - Montgomery, Alabama
- City US 31 - Montgomery, Alabama
- Truck US 31 - Montgomery, Alabama
- US 31A - Pulaski to Nashville, Tennessee
- Bus. US 31A - Lewisburg, Tennessee
- Truck US 31 - Franklin, Tennessee
- Byp. US 31E - Hendersonville, Tennessee (unsigned)
- Bus. US 31E - Scottsville, Kentucky
- Byp. US 31W - Bowling Green, Kentucky
- Bus. US 31E - Glasgow, Kentucky
- Byp. US 31W - Elizabethtown, Kentucky
- Truck US 31W - Elizabethtown, Kentucky
- Truck US 31E - Bardstown, Kentucky
- Bus. US 31W - West Point, Kentucky
- US 31EX - Mount Washington, Kentucky
- Alt. US 31 - Dudleytown to Columbus, Indiana
- Byp. US 31 - Kokomo, Indiana
- Bus. US 31 - Peru, Indiana
- Alt. US 31 - Plymouth, Indiana
- Bus. US 31 - Plymouth, Indiana
- Bus. US 31 - South Bend, Indiana
- Byp. US 31 - South Bend, Indiana (may or may not have existed)
- Bus. US 31 - Niles to Niles Charter Township, Michigan
- Bus. US 31 - South Haven Charter Township to Casco Township, Michigan
- Bus. US 31 - Holland to Holland Charter Township, Michigan
- US 31A - Muskegon Heights to Muskegon, Michigan
- Bus. US 31 - Norton Shores to Muskegon Township, Michigan
- Bus. US 31 - Whitehall Township to Montague Township, Michigan
- Bus. US 31 - Hart Township to Hart, Michigan
- Bus. US 31 - Weare Township to Pentwater Township, Michigan
- Bus. US 31 - Pere Marquette Charter Township, Michigan

=== US 33 ===
- Bus. US 33 – Stanardsville, Virginia
- Bus. US 33 – Elkton, Virginia
- Bus. US 33 – Nelsonville, Ohio
- Bus. US 33 – Lancaster, Ohio
- Bus. US 33 – Fort Wayne, Indiana
- Truck US 33 – Fort Wayne, Indiana

=== US 34 ===
- Bus. US 34 - Estes Park, Colorado
- Bus. US 34 - Greeley, Colorado
- Bus. US 34 - Brush, Colorado
- Bus. US 34 - Glenwood, Iowa
- Bus. US 34 - Chariton, Iowa
- Bus. US 34 - Ottumwa, Iowa
- Bus. US 34 - Fairfield, Iowa
- Bus. US 34 - Westwood to Mount Pleasant, Iowa

=== US 35 ===
- Spur US 35 – Scott Depot, West Virginia
- Temp. US 35 – Point Pleasant, West Virginia to Kanauga, Ohio
- Bus. US 35 – Jackson, Ohio
- Bus. US 35 – Xenia, Ohio
- Byp. US 35 – Xenia, Ohio

=== US 36 ===
- Bus US 36 – St. Joseph, Missouri
- Bus. US 36 – Cameron, Missouri
- Bus. US 36 – Hamilton, Missouri
- Bus. US 36 – Mooresville, Missouri
- Bus. US 36 – Chillicothe, Missouri
- Bus. US 36 – Brookfield, Missouri
- Bus. US 36 – Macon, Missouri
- Spur US 36 - Macon, Missouri
- Bus. US 36 – Clarence, Missouri
- Bus. US 36 – Shelbina, Missouri
- Bus. US 36 – Monroe City, Missouri
- Bus. US 36 – Hannibal, Missouri
- City US 36 - Hannibal, Missouri
- Temp. US 36 – Baker to Greenville, Ohio

=== US 40 ===
- Bus. US 40 - Oakland to Berkeley, California
- Temp. US 40 - American Canyon to Cordelia, California
- Bus. US 40 - West Sacramento, California
- Bus. US 40 - North Sacramento, California
- Alt. US 40 - Davis, California to Reno, Nevada
- Alt. US 40 - Salt Lake City, Utah
- Alt. US 40 - Park City, Utah
- Temp. US 40 - Steamboat Springs to Kremmling, Colorado
- Bus. US 40 - WaKeeney, Kansas
- Bus. US 40 - Russell, Kansas
- City US 40 - Salina, Kansas
- Alt. US 40 - Junction City to Grandview Plaza, Kansas
- Bus. US 40 - Junction City to Grandview Plaza, Kansas
- Temp. US 40 - Junction City to Manhattan, Kansas
- Temp. US 40 - Junction City to Topeka, Kansas
- Bus. US 40 - Kansas City, Kansas
- Opt. US 40 - Kansas City, Missouri
- City US 40 - Kansas City, Missouri
- Alt. US 40 - Kansas City to Independence, Missouri
- Opt. US 40 - Kansas City to Leeds, Missouri
- Opt. US 40 - Independence to Kansas City, Missouri
- Bus. US 40 - Columbia, Missouri
- Byp. US 40 - Wentzville, Missouri to Troy, Illinois
- City US 40 - Pattonville to St. Louis, Missouri
- Truck US 40 - Frontenac, Missouri to East St. Louis, Illinois
- Alt. US 40 - Bridgeton to St. Louis, Missouri
- Bus. US 40 - St. Louis, Missouri
- Spur US 40 - St. Louis, Missouri
- Bus. US 40 - East St. Louis to Collinsville, Illinois
- City US 40 - East St. Louis to Collinsville, Illinois
- Alt. US 40 - East St. Louis to Collinsville, Illinois
- Alt. US 40 - Greenville to Vandalia, Illinois
- Temp. US 40 - Columbus to Bexley, Ohio
- Spur US 40 - Wheeling, West Virginia
- Alt. US 40 - Washington, Pennsylvania
- Thru US 40 - Washington, Pennsylvania
- Bus. US 40 - Brownsville, Pennsylvania
- Alt. US 40 - Uniontown, Pennsylvania
- Bus. US 40 - Uniontown to Hopwood, Pennsylvania
- Alt. US 40 - Keysers Ridge to Cumberland, Maryland
- Scenic US 40 - Bellegrove to Piney Grove, Maryland
- Alt. US 40 - Hagerstown to Frederick, Maryland
- Truck US 40 - Baltimore, Maryland

=== US 41 ===
- Temp. US 41 - Naples Manor to Naples Park, Florida
- Bus. US 41 - Fort Myers to North Fort Myers, Florida
- Bus. US 41 - Venice, Florida
- Bus. US 41 - Bradenton, Florida
- Bus. US 41 - Palm River-Clair Mel to north of Tampa, Florida
- Bus. US 41 - Valdosta, Georgia
- Bus. US 41 - Macon, Georgia
- Bus. US 41 - Griffin, Georgia
- Bus. US 41 - Southeast of Hapeville to Atlanta, Georgia
- City US 41 - Atlanta, Georgia
- Alt. US 41 - Atlanta to Marietta, Georgia
- Byp. US 41 - Atlanta to Marietta, Georgia
- Temp. US 41 - Atlanta to Marietta, Georgia
- Temp. US 41 - Atlanta to Smyrna, Georgia
- Temp. US 41 - Atlanta to Smyrna, Georgia
- Temp. US 41 - Atlanta, Georgia
- Bus. US 41 - Cartersville, Georgia
- Truck US 41 - Ringgold, Georgia
- Alt. US 41 - Monteagle, Tennessee to Hopkinsville, Kentucky
- Byp. US 41A - Clarksville, Tennessee
- Truck US 41 - Hopkinsville, Kentucky
- Alt. US 41 - Madisonville to Henderson, Kentucky
- Bus. US 41 - Terre Haute, Indiana
- Bus. US 41 - Vincennes, Indiana
- Bus. US 41 - Princeton, Indiana
- Bus. US 41 - Evansville, Indiana
- Temp. US 41 - Lincolnwood to Skokie, Illinois
- Temp. US 41 - Highland Park to Del Mar Woods, Illinois
- Toll US 41 - Lansing to Antioch, Illinois
- Temp. US 41 - Milwaukee, Wisconsin
- City US 41 - Fond du Lac, Wisconsin
- City US 41 - Oshkosh, Wisconsin
- Bus. US 41 - Appleton, Wisconsin
- Bus. US 41 - De Pere to Ashwaubenon, Wisconsin
- Bus. US 41 - Oconto, Wisconsin
- Bus. US 41 - Peshtigo, Wisconsin
- Bus. US 41 - Marquette, Michigan
- Alt. US 41 - Ishpeming to Negaunee, Michigan
- Bus. US 41 - Baraga, Michigan

=== US 42 ===
- Alt. US 42 – Cincinnati to Sharonville, Ohio
- Bus. US 42 – Covington, Kentucky

=== US 43 ===
- Alt. US 43 – Mobile to Chickasaw, Alabama
- Bus. US 43 – Tuscumbia, Alabama

=== US 44 ===
- US 44A – Manchester to West Ashford, Connecticut

=== US 45 ===
- Bus. US 45 – Shubuta, Mississippi
- Bus. US 45 – Meridian, Mississippi
- Alt. US 45 – Northeast of Brooksville to Shannon, Mississippi
- Bus. US 45 – south-southeast of Okolona to Shannon, Mississippi
- Bus. US 45 – Tupelo, Mississippi
- Alt. US 45 – Southwest of Medina, Tennessee, to Fulton, Kentucky
- Byp. US 45 – Jackson, Tennessee
- Bus. US 45W- Humboldt, Tennessee
- Bus. US 45W – Trenton, Tennessee
- Bus. US 45E – Martin, Tennessee
- Byp. US 45 – Fulton, Kentucky
- Byp. US 45 – Mayfield, Kentucky
- Bus. US 45 – Paducah, Kentucky
- Byp. US 45 – Paducah, Kentucky
- Byp. US 45 – Norris City, Illinois
- Bus. US 45 – New London, Wisconsin
- Bus. US 45 – Wittenberg, Wisconsin

=== US 49 ===
- Bus. US 49 – Hattiesburg, Mississippi
- Bus. US 49 – Bentonia, Mississippi
- Bus. US 49E – Greenwood, Mississippi
- US 49B – Helena–West Helena, Arkansas
- US 49B – Jonesboro, Arkansas
- US 49B – Brookland, Arkansas
- US 49B – Paragould, Arkansas
- US 49Y – Paragould, Arkansas

=== US 50 ===
- Bus. US 50 - Oakland, California
- Bus. US 50 - Sacramento, California
- Alt. US 50 - signed, but unofficial, route between Pollock Pines and South Lake Tahoe, California
- Temp. US 50 - Carson City, Nevada
- Bus. US 50 - Carson City, Nevada
- Alt. US 50 - Silver Springs to Fallon, Nevada via Fernley
- Alt. US 50 - Fallon, Nevada
- Alt. US 50 - Ely, Nevada to Provo, Utah
- Temp. US 50 - Colton to Castle Gate, Utah
- Bus. US 50 - Pueblo to Avondale, Colorado
- Bus. US 50 - Olathe, Colorado
- Alt. US 50 - Garden City, Kansas
- Bus. US 50 - Garden City, Kansas
- Byp. US 50 - Garden City, Kansas
- Alt. US 50 - Dodge City, Kansas
- Bus. US 50 - Dodge City, Kansas
- Byp. US 50 - Dodge City, Kansas
- Bus. US 50 - Ottawa, Kansas
- Opt. US 50 - Olathe, Kansas to Lone Jack, Missouri
- Bus. US 50 - Warrensburg, Missouri
- Bus. US 50 - Knob Noster, Missouri
- Spur US 50 - Smithton, Missouri
- Bus. US 50 - California, Missouri
- Bus. US 50 - St. Martins, Missouri
- Bus. US 50 - Jefferson City, Missouri
- Bus. US 50 - Jefferson City, Missouri
- U.S. Route 50W - Union, Missouri
- Bus. US 50 - Brentwood to St. Louis, Missouri
- City US 50 - Brentwood to St. Louis, Missouri
- Byp. US 50 - Mehlville, Missouri to Fairview Heights, Illinois
- Truck US 50 - St. Louis, Missouri
- Alt. US 50 - Sumner to Lawrenceville, Illinois
- Bus. US 50 - Lawrenceville, Illinois
- Bus. US 50 - Vincennes, Indiana
- Bus. US 50 - Washington, Indiana
- Bus. US 50 - Bedford, Indiana
- Byp. US 50 - Cleves to Milford, Ohio
- Truck US 50 - Cincinnati, Ohio
- Alt. US 50 - Athens, Ohio to Ellenboro, West Virginia
- Bus. US 50 - Belpre, Ohio
- Bus. US 50 - Parkersburg, West Virginia
- Alt. US 50 - Washington, D.C.
- Byp. US 50 - Washington, D.C.
- Temp. US 50 - Washington, D.C. to Ardmore, Maryland
- Bus. US 50 - Salisbury, Maryland

=== US 51 ===
- Bus. US 51 – Ponchatoula to Hammond, Louisiana
- Bus. US 51 – McComb, Mississippi
- Bus. US 51 – Crystal Springs, Mississippi
- Truck US 51 – Memphis, Tennessee
- Bus. US 51 – Dyersburg, Tennessee
- Byp. US 51 – Dyersburg, Tennessee
- Bus. US 51 – Elwin to Decatur, Illinois
- Bus. US 51 – Clinton, Illinois
- Bus. US 51 – Bloomington to Normal, Illinois
- Bus. US 51 – LaSalle, Illinois
- Spur US 51 – Beloit, Wisconsin
- Bus. US 51 – Plover to Stevens Point, Wisconsin
- Bus. US 51 – Rothschild to Wausau, Wisconsin
- Bus. US 51 – Merrill, Wisconsin
- Bus. US 51 – Tomahawk, Wisconsin

=== US 52 ===
- Bus. US 52 - Minot, North Dakota
- Bus. US 52 - Harvey, North Dakota
- Bus. US 52 - Valley City, North Dakota
- Truck US 52 - Jamestown, North Dakota
- Alt. US 52 - Luxemburg to Dubuque, Iowa
- Bus. US 52 - Fowler, Indiana
- Bus. US 52 - Lafayette, Indiana
- Bus. US 52 - Hanging Rock to Coal Grove, Ohio
- Truck US 52 - Williamson, West Virginia to South Williamson, Kentucky
- Alt. US 52 - Welch, West Virginia
- Truck US 52 - Bluefield, West Virginia
- US 52A - Mount Airy, North Carolina
- Bus. US 52 - Mount Airy, North Carolina
- US 52A - Pilot Mountain, North Carolina
- Bus. US 52 - Pilot Mountain, North Carolina
- Byp. US 52 - Pilot Mountain, North Carolina
- Bus. US 52 - Albemarle, North Carolina
- Truck US 52 - Cheraw, South Carolina
- Bus. US 52 - Darlington, South Carolina
- Alt. US 52 - Florence, South Carolina
- Conn. US 52 - Florence, South Carolina
- Truck US 52 - Florence, South Carolina
- Alt. US 52 - Lake City, South Carolina
- Conn. US 52 - North Charleston, South Carolina
- Alt. US 52 - North Charleston to Charleston, South Carolina
- Alt. US 52 - Charleston, South Carolina
- Spur US 52 - Charleston, South Carolina

=== US 53 ===
- Bus. US 53 - Eau Claire, Wisconsin
- Byp. US 53 - Eau Claire, Wisconsin
- Alt. US 53 - Lake Hallie to Chippewa Falls, Wisconsin
- Bus. US 53 - Minong, Wisconsin
- Bus. US 53 - Solon Springs, Wisconsin
- Bus. US 53 - Superior, Wisconsin
- Bus. US 53 - Virginia, Minnesota

=== US 54 ===
- Bus. US 54 – El Paso, Texas to Texas/New Mexico state line
- Bus. US 54 – Alamogordo, New Mexico
- Bus. US 54 – Tucumcari, New Mexico
- Bus. US 54 – Lake Ozark, Missouri
- Bus. US 54 – Eldon, Missouri
- Alt. US 54 – Jefferson City, Missouri
- Bus. US 54 – Fulton, Missouri
- Bus. US 54 – Mexico, Missouri
- Bus. US 54 - Bowling Green, Missouri
- Bus. US 54 – Louisiana, Missouri
- City US 54 - Kankakee, Illinois
- Bus. US 54 – Kankakee, Illinois

=== US 56 ===
- Temp. US 56 - Boise City, Oklahoma to Elkhart, Kansas
- Bus. US 56 - Herington, Kansas

=== US 58 ===
- Bus. US 58 - Ewing to Rose Hill, Virginia
- Alt. US 58 - Jonesville to Abingdon, Virginia
- Bus. US 58 - Dryden, Virginia
- Alt. Bus. US 58 - Dryden, Virginia
- Alt. Bus. US 58 - Norton, Virginia
- Bus. US 58 - Gate City, Virginia
- Bus. US 58 - Hillsville, Virginia
- Bus. US 58 - west of Meadows of Dan, Virginia
- Bus. US 58 - Stuart, Virginia
- Bus. US 58 - Martinsville, Virginia
- Bus. US 58 - Danville, Virginia
- Bus. US 58 - Clarksville, Virginia
- Bus. US 58 - Boydton, Virginia
- Bus. US 58 - South Hill, Virginia
- Bus. US 58 - Lawrenceville, Virginia
- Bus. US 58 - Emporia, Virginia
- Bus. US 58 - Courtland, Virginia
- Bus. US 58 - Franklin to Carrsville, Virginia
- Bus. US 58 - Suffolk, Virginia
- Alt. US 58 - Portsmouth, Virginia
- Bus. US 58 - Virginia Beach, Virginia

=== US 59 ===
- Bus. US 59 - Laredo, Texas
- Bus. US 59 - George West, Texas
- Bus. US 59 - Victoria to Telferner, Texas
- Bus. US 59 - El Campo, Texas
- Bus. US 59 - Wharton to Hungerford, Texas
- Alt. US 59 - Southside Place to Houston, Texas
- Bus. US 59 - Houston, Texas
- Bus. US 59 - Splendora, Texas
- Bus. US 59 - Livingston, Texas
- Bus. US 59 - Lufkin, Texas
- Bus. US 59 - Nacogdoches to Redfield, Texas
- Bus. US 59 - Carthage, Texas
- Bus. US 59 - Jefferson, Texas
- Temp. US 59 - Maud, Texas to Page, Oklahoma
- Bus. US 59 - Texarkana, Texas to Texarkana, Arkansas
- Byp. US 59 - Texarkana, Texas
- Byp. US 59 - Poteau, Oklahoma
- Alt. US 59 - Fort Smith, Arkansas to West Siloam Springs, Oklahoma
- Temp. US 59 - Fort Smith, Arkansas to West Siloam Springs, Oklahoma
- Bus. US 59 - Ottawa, Kansas
- Bus. US 59 - Industrial City to St. Joseph, Missouri
- City US 59 - Industrial City to St. Joseph, Missouri

=== US 60 ===
- Bus. US 60 – Riverside, California
- Bus. US 60 – Banning, California
- Bus. US 60 – Superior, Arizona
- Temp. US 60 – Globe to Springerville, Arizona
- Truck US 60 – Globe, Arizona
- Bus. US 60 – Tonkawa, Oklahoma
- Bus. US 60 – Ponca City, Oklahoma
- City US 60 – Ponca City, Oklahoma
- Bus. US 60 – West Seneca, Oklahoma to Seneca, Missouri
- Bus. US 60 – Neosho, Missouri
- Bus. US 60 – Monett, Missouri
- Bus. US 60 – Verona to Aurora, Missouri
- Bus. US 60 – Springfield, Missouri
- City US 60 – Springfield, Missouri
- Bus. US 60 – Rogersville, Missouri
- Bus. US 60 – Mansfield, Missouri
- Bus. US 60 – Mountain Grove, Missouri
- Bus. US 60 – Cabool, Missouri
- Bus. US 60 – Willow Springs, Missouri
- Bus. US 60 – Van Buren, Missouri
- Bus. US 60 – Poplar Bluff, Missouri
- Bus. US 60 – Dexter, Missouri
- Bus. US 60 – Sikeston to Charleston, Missouri
- Bus. US 60 – Paducah, Kentucky
- City US 60 – Paducah, Kentucky
- Byp. US 60 – Morganfield, Kentucky
- Truck US 60 – Morganfield, Kentucky
- Bus. US 60 – Owensboro, Kentucky
- Byp. US 60 – Owensboro, Kentucky
- Bus. US 60 – Cloverport, Kentucky
- Alt. US 60 – Louisville, Kentucky
- Bus. US 60 – Louisville, Kentucky
- Truck US 60 – Louisville, Kentucky
- Bus. US 60 – Frankfort, Kentucky
- Bus. US 60 – Versailles, Kentucky
- Bus. US 60 – Lexington, Kentucky
- Byp. US 60 - Lexington, Kentucky
- Truck US 60 – Lexington, Kentucky
- Truck US 60 – Winchester, Kentucky
- Truck US 60 – Salt Lake to Midland, Kentucky
- Bus. US 60 – Ashland, Kentucky
- Truck US 60 – Charleston, West Virginia
- Bus. US 60 – Clifton Forge, Virginia
- Truck US 60 - Richmond, Virginia
- Bus. US 60 – Williamsburg, Virginia
- Bus. US 60 – Newport News, Virginia
- Alt. US 60 - Norfolk, Virginia

=== US 61 ===
- Bus. US 61 - Baton Rouge, Louisiana
- Byp. US 61 - Baton Rouge, Louisiana
- Bus. US 61 - St. Francisville, Louisiana
- Bus. US 61 - Natchez, Mississippi
- Bus. US 61 - Port Gibson, Mississippi
- Bus. US 61 - Vicksburg, Mississippi
- Bus. US 61 - Leland, Mississippi
- Bus. US 61 - Merigold to Shelby, Mississippi
- Bus. US 61 - Blytheville, Arkansas
- Bus. US 61 - Holland to Steele, Missouri
- Spur US 61 - New Madrid, Missouri
- Bus. US 61 - Sikeston, Missouri
- Bus. US 61 - Cape Girardeau, Missouri
- City US 61 - Cape Girardeau, Missouri
- Bus. US 61 - Bowling Green, Missouri
- Spur US 61 - Bowling Green, Missouri
- Bus. US 61 - New London, Missouri
- Bus. US 61 - Hannibal, Missouri
- City US 61 - Hannibal, Missouri
- Bus. US 61 - Palmyra, Missouri
- Bus. US 61 - La Grange, Missouri
- Bus. US 61 - Canton, Missouri
- Bus. US 61 - Keokuk, Iowa
- Bus. US 61 - Jefferson Township to Washington Township, Iowa
- Bus. US 61 - Muscatine, Iowa
- Bus. US 61 - Davenport, Iowa
- Bus. US 61 - Maquoketa, Iowa

=== US 62 ===
- Bus. US 62 - Snyder, Oklahoma
- Temp. US 62 - Lawton, Oklahoma
- Temp. US 62 - Oklahoma City, Oklahoma
- Bus. US 62 - Henryetta, Oklahoma
- Bus. US 62 - Muskogee, Oklahoma
- Bus. US 62 - Tahlequah, Oklahoma
- US 62B - Fayetteville, Arkansas
- US 62B - Rogers, Arkansas
- US 62B - Eureka Springs, Arkansas
- City US 62 - Eureka Springs, Arkansas
- US 62S - Berryville, Arkansas
- US 62S - Pyatt, Arkansas
- US 62B - Yellville, Arkansas
- US 62B - Cotter, Arkansas
- US 62B - Mountain Home, Arkansas
- US 62B - Prairie Grove, Arkansas
- US 62B - Salem, Arkansas
- City US 62 - Sikeston, Missouri
- Temp. US 62 - Dawson Springs to Nortonville, Kentucky
- Truck US 62 - Elizabethtown, Kentucky
- Truck US 62 - Lawrenceburg, Kentucky
- Bus. US 62 - Maysville, Kentucky
- Temp. US 62 - Alliance, Ohio
- Bus. US 62 - Sharon, Pennsylvania
- Byp. US 62 - Sharon, Pennsylvania
- Bus. US 62 - Niagara Falls, New York

=== US 63 ===
- US 63S - Moro Bay, Arkansas
- US 63B - Hermitage, Arkansas
- US 63B - Warren, Arkansas
- US 63B - Pine Bluff, Arkansas
- US 63S - Hazen, Arkansas
- US 63B - Marked Tree, Arkansas
- US 63C - Trumann, Arkansas
- US 63B - Jonesboro, Arkansas
- US 63B - Bono, Arkansas
- US 63B - Hoxie, Arkansas
- US 63B - Hardy, Arkansas
- Bus. US 63 - Thayer, Missouri
- Bus. US 63 - West Plains, Missouri
- Bus. US 63 - Willow Springs, Missouri
- Bus. US 63 - Cabool, Missouri
- Bus. US 63 - Columbia, Missouri
- Conn. US 63 - Columbia, Missouri
- Spur US 63 - Columbia, Missouri
- Bus. US 63 - Renick to Moberly, Missouri
- Bus. US 63 - Kirksville, Missouri
- City US 63 - Kirksville, Missouri
- Bus. US 63 - Ottumwa, Iowa
- Bus. US 63 - New Hampton, Iowa

=== US 64 ===
- Bus. US 64 - Farmington, New Mexico
- Bus. US 64 - Enid, Oklahoma
- Bus. US 64 - Muskogee, Oklahoma
- US 64B - Alma, Arkansas
- City US 64 - Alma, Arkansas
- US 64B - Vilonia, Arkansas
- US 64B - Beebe, Arkansas
- City US 64 - Beebe, Arkansas
- US 64B - Augusta, Arkansas
- US 64B - Patterson to McCrory, Arkansas
- US 64B - Wynne, Arkansas
- City US 64 - Wynne, Arkansas
- US 64S - Wynne, Arkansas
- US 64B - Parkin, Arkansas
- US 64B - Earle, Arkansas
- US 64B - Crawfordsville, Arkansas
- Bus. US 64 - Whiteville, Tennessee
- Bus. US 64 - Selmer, Tennessee
- Truck US 64 - Savannah, Tennessee
- Byp. US 64 - Waynesboro, Tennessee
- Bus. US 64 - Lawrenceburg, Tennessee
- Bus. US 64 - Pulaski, Tennessee
- Bus. US 64 - Fayetteville, Tennessee
- Byp. US 64 - Fayetteville, Tennessee
- Bus. US 64 - Winchester to Monteagle, Tennessee
- Bus. US 64 - Chattanooga, Tennessee
- Byp. US 64 - Cleveland, Tennessee
- Alt. US 64 - southeast of Murphy, North Carolina
- Bus. US 64 - Hayesville, North Carolina
- Truck US 64 - Franklin, North Carolina to Hendersonville, North Carolina
- Bus. US 64 - Rosman, North Carolina
- US 64A - Brevard, North Carolina
- Bus. US 64 (1960–1980) - Brevard, North Carolina
- Bus. US 64 (2006–) - Brevard, North Carolina
- US 64A - Bat Cave to Morganton, North Carolina
- Bus. US 64 - Morganton, North Carolina
- Byp. US 64 - Morganton, North Carolina
- Truck US 64 - Morganton, North Carolina
- US 64A - Statesville, North Carolina
- Bus. US 64 - Statesville, North Carolina
- Bus. US 64 - Asheboro, North Carolina
- US 64A - Franklinville to Ramseur, North Carolina
- US 64A - Siler City, North Carolina
- Bus. US 64 - Pittsboro, North Carolina
- Bus. US 64 - Raleigh, North Carolina
- Bus. US 64 - Raleigh to Zebulon, North Carolina
- Alt. US 64 - Spring Hope to Nashville, North Carolina
- Bus. US 64 - Nashville, North Carolina
- US 64A - Rocky Mount, North Carolina
- Alt. US 64 - Rocky Mount to Tarboro, North Carolina
- Bus. US 64 - Rocky Mount, North Carolina
- Bus. US 64 - Tarboro to Princeville, North Carolina
- Alt. US 64 - Princeville to Williamston, North Carolina
- US 64A - Williamston, North Carolina
- Bus. US 64 - Williamston, North Carolina
- Bus. US 64 - Jamesville, North Carolina
- Alt. US 64 - Roper, North Carolina
- US 64A - Columbia, North Carolina
- Bus. US 64 - Columbia, North Carolina
- Byp. US 64 - Manns Harbor to Manteo, North Carolina

=== US 65 ===
- Byp. US 65 – Baton Rouge, Louisiana
- US 65B – Pine Bluff, Arkansas
- City US 65 – Pine Bluff, Arkansas
- US 65S – Pine Bluff, Arkansas
- US 65B – Conway, Arkansas
- US 65B – Clinton, Arkansas
- US 65B – Western Grove, Arkansas
- US 65B – Harrison, Arkansas
- Spur US 65 – Tina, Missouri
- Bus. US 65 – Point Lookout to Branson, Missouri
- Bus. US 65 – Ozark, Missouri
- Bus. US 65 – Springfield, Missouri
- Byp. US 65 – Springfield, Missouri
- Spur US 65 – Warsaw, Missouri
- Bus. US 65 – Marshall, Missouri
- Bus. US 65 – Carrollton, Missouri
- Bus. US 65 – Trenton, Missouri
- City US 65 – Trenton, Missouri

=== US 66 ===
- Alt. US 66 - Los Angeles to Pasadena, California
- Bus. US 66 - San Bernardino, California
- City US 66 - San Bernardino, California
- Bus. US 66 - Flagstaff, Arizona
- Bus. US 66 - Amarillo, Texas
- City US 66 - Amarillo, Texas
- Bus. US 66 - Clinton, Oklahoma
- City US 66 - Clinton, Oklahoma
- Alt. US 66 - Oklahoma City, Oklahoma
- Bus. US 66 - Oklahoma City, Oklahoma
- City US 66 - Oklahoma City, Oklahoma
- Bus. US 66 - Tulsa, Oklahoma
- Byp. US 66 - Tulsa, Oklahoma
- Alt. US 66 - Joplin, Missouri
- Bus. US 66 - Joplin, Missouri
- Byp. US 66 - Joplin, Missouri
- Alt. US 66 - Joplin to Webb City, Missouri
- Bus. US 66 - Webb City to Carterville, Missouri
- Alt. US 66 - Carthage to Kendricktown, Missouri
- Bus. US 66 - Carthage, Missouri
- Alt. Bus. US 66 - Springfield, Missouri
- Bus. US 66 - Springfield, Missouri
- Byp. US 66 - Springfield, Missouri
- City US 66 - Springfield, Missouri
- Bus. US 66 - Lebanon, Missouri
- Bus. US 66 - Waynesville, Missouri
- Spur US 66 - Fort Leonard Wood, Missouri
- Bus. US 66 - Rolla, Missouri
- City US 66 - Rolla, Missouri
- Bus. US 66 - Pacific, Missouri
- Bus. US 66 - St. Louis to Sunset Hills, Missouri
- Byp. US 66 - St. Louis to Sunset Hills, Missouri
- Opt. US 66 - St. Louis, Missouri to Venice, Illinois
- City US 66 - St. Louis, Missouri to Mitchell, Illinois
- City US 66 - Kirkwood to Bellefontaine Neighbors, Missouri
- Bus. US 66 - East St. Louis to Mitchell, Illinois
- Temp. US 66 - Livingston to Springfield, Illinois
- Bus. US 66 - Springfield, Illinois
- City US 66 - Springfield, Illinois
- Bus. US 66 - Lincoln, Illinois
- City US 66 - Lincoln, Illinois
- Bus. US 66 - Bloomington, Illinois
- City US 66 - Bloomington, Illinois
- Alt. US 66 - Gardner to Bolingbrook, Illinois
- Alt. US 66 - Joliet, Illinois

=== US 67 ===
- Bus. US 67 - Presidio, Texas
- Bus. US 67 - San Angelo, Texas (west)
- Bus. US 67 - San Angelo, Texas (east)
- Bus. US 67 - Dublin, Texas
- Bus. US 67 - Stephenville, Texas
- Bus. US 67 - Cleburne, Texas
- Bus. US 67 - Alvarado, Texas
- Bus. US 67 - Midlothian, Texas
- Bus. US 67 - Dallas, Texas
- Bus. US 67 - Greenville, Texas
- Bus. US 67 - Sulphur Springs, Texas
- US 67B - Beebe, Arkansas
- US 67B - Searcy, Arkansas
- City US 67 - Searcy, Arkansas
- City US 67 - Judsonia, Arkansas
- US 67B - Hoxie to Walnut Ridge, Arkansas
- US 67C - Walnut Ridge, Arkansas
- US 67B - Pocahontas, Arkansas
- US 67B - Biggers, Arkansas
- US 67S - Biggers, Arkansas
- US 67B - Reyno, Arkansas
- US 67B - Datto, Arkansas
- US 67S - Datto, Arkansas
- Bus. US 67 - Poplar Bluff, Missouri
- Bus. US 67 - Greenville, Missouri
- Bus. US 67 - Fredericktown, Missouri
- Bus. US 67 - Leadington to Park Hills, Missouri
- Alt. US 67 - Mehlville, Missouri to Alton, Illinois
- Byp. US 67 - Mehlville, Missouri to Alton, Illinois
- Byp. US 67 - Mehlville to Bellefontaine, Missouri
- Alt. US 67 - Godfrey to Murrayville, Illinois
- Bus. US 67 - Jacksonville, Illinois
- Bus. US 67 - Roseville, Illinois
- Byp. US 67 - Roseville, Illinois
- Alt. US 67 - Riverdale to Le Claire, Iowa

=== US 68 ===
- Bus. US 68 – Cadiz, Kentucky
- Byp. US 68 – Hopkinsville, Kentucky
- Truck US 68 - Hopkinsville, Kentucky
- Alt. US 68 – Fairview, Kentucky
- Bus. US 68 – Elkton, Kentucky
- Bus. US 68 – Russellville, Kentucky
- Bus. US 68 – Auburn, Kentucky
- Alt. US 68 – Bowling Green, Kentucky
- Bus. US 68 – Bowling Green, Kentucky
- Bus. US 68 – Glasgow, Kentucky
- Truck US 68 - Glasgow, Kentucky
- Bus. US 68 – Lexington, Kentucky
- Bus. US 68 – Paris, Kentucky
- Byp. US 68 – Paris, Kentucky
- Alt. US 68 – Maysville, Kentucky to Aberdeen, Ohio
- Bus. US 68 – Maysville, Kentucky to Aberdeen, Ohio
- Byp. US 68 – Springfield, Ohio

=== US 69 ===
- Bus. US 69 - Lufkin, Texas
- Bus. US 69 - Greenville, Texas
- Bus. US 69 - Trenton, Texas
- Bus. US 69 - Durant, Oklahoma
- Bus. US 69 - McAlester, Oklahoma
- Bus. US 69 - Eufaula, Oklahoma
- Bus. US 69 - Checotah, Oklahoma
- Bus. US 69 - Vinita, Oklahoma
- Bus. US 69 - Miami, Oklahoma
- City US 69 - Commerce, Oklahoma
- Alt. US 69 - south of Picher, Oklahoma to north of Crestline, Kansas
- Bus. US 69 - Baxter Springs, Kansas
- Bus. US 69 - Columbus, Kansas
- Bus. US 69 - Pittsburg, Kansas
- Bus. US 69 - Frontenac, Kansas
- Bus. US 69 - Franklin to Arma, Kansas
- Bus. US 69 - Fort Scott, Kansas
- Bus. US 69 - Overland Park, Kansas
- Bus. US 69 - Excelsior Springs, Missouri
- Spur US 69 - Bethany, Missouri

=== US 70 ===
- Bus. US 70 - Pomona, California
- Bus. US 70 - Banning, California
- Bus. US 70 - Superior, Arizona
- Bus. US 70 - Alamogordo, New Mexico
- Bus. US 70 - Ruidoso, New Mexico
- Truck US 70 - Roswell, New Mexico
- Bus. US 70 - Portales, New Mexico
- Alt. US 70 - Wilson, Oklahoma
- City US 70 - Wilson, Oklahoma
- Byp. US 70 - Durant, Oklahoma
- Truck US 70 - Durant, Oklahoma
- Bus. US 70 - Hugo, Oklahoma
- Byp. US 70 - Idabel, Oklahoma
- US 70B - De Queen, Arkansas
- Temp. US 70 - Lockesburg to Kirby, Arkansas
- US 70B - Glenwood, Arkansas
- US 70B - Hot Springs, Arkansas
- City US 70 - Hot Springs, Arkansas
- City US 70 - Benton, Arkansas
- US 70B - Little Rock to North Little Rock, Arkansas
- US 70A - Brownsville to Huntingdon, Tennessee
- Byp. US 70A - Humboldt, Tennessee
- Bus. US 70 - Huntingdon, Tennessee
- Bus. US 70 - Camden, Tennessee
- Bus. US 70 - Dickson, Tennessee
- Bus. US 70 - Lebanon, Tennessee
- Bus. US 70S - McMinnville, Tennessee
- Bus. US 70 - Marshall, North Carolina
- US 70A - Morganton, North Carolina
- Bus. US 70 - Morganton, North Carolina
- US 70A (1946–1948) - Hildebran to Conover, North Carolina
- US 70A (1948–1957) - Hildebran to Conover
- US 70A - Salisbury, North Carolina
- US 70A - Lexington, North Carolina
- Bus. US 70 - Lexington, North Carolina
- Bus. US 70 - Thomasville, North Carolina
- US 70A - High Point to Greensboro, North Carolina
- US 70A (1934–1948) - High Point, North Carolina
- US 70A (1948–1957) - High Point, North Carolina
- US 70A - Greensboro, North Carolina
- US 70A (1942–1948) - Hillsborough, North Carolina
- US 70A (1948–1960) - Hillsborough, North Carolina
- Bus. US 70 - Hillsborough, North Carolina
- US 70A - Durham to Raleigh, North Carolina
- US 70A - Durham, North Carolina
- Bus. US 70 - Durham, North Carolina
- Bus. US 70 - Garner, North Carolina
- Bus. US 70 - Clayton to Smithfield, North Carolina
- US 70A - Smithfield, North Carolina
- Byp. US 70 - Selma, North Carolina
- US 70A - Selma to near Princeton, North Carolina, via Pine Level
- US 70A - Goldsboro, North Carolina
- Bus. US 70 - Goldsboro, North Carolina
- Byp. US 70 - Goldsboro, North Carolina
- US 70A - Kinston, North Carolina
- Bus. US 70 - Kinston, North Carolina
- Bus. US 70 - New Bern, North Carolina
- Bus. US 70 - Beaufort, North Carolina

=== US 71 ===
- Bus. US 71 – Alexandria, Louisiana
- Byp. US 71 – Alexandria, Louisiana
- US 71B – Waldron, Arkansas
- US 71B – Fort Smith to Alma, Arkansas
- US 71B – Fayetteville to Bentonville, Arkansas
- US 71S – Fayetteville, Arkansas
- US 71B – Bentonville, Arkansas
- City US 71 – Bentonville, Arkansas
- Temp. US 71 – Bentonville, Arkansas to Lanagan, Missouri
- Byp. US 71 - Douglas County, MO to Bella Vista, AR
- Alt. US 71 – Pineville to Anderson, Missouri
- Bus. US 71 – Neosho, Missouri
- Alt. US 71 – Neosho to Carthage, Missouri
- Opt. US 71 – Neosho to Carthage, Missouri
- Bus. US 71 – Saginaw to Webb City, Missouri, via Joplin
- Spur US 71 – Milo, Missouri
- Bus. US 71 – Nevada, Missouri
- Bus. US 71 – Butler to Passaic, Missouri
- Bus. US 71 – Kansas City, Missouri
- City US 71 – Kansas City, Missouri
- Byp. US 71 – Harrisonville to Ferrelview, Missouri, via Kansas City, Missouri
- Byp. US 71 – Tracy, Missouri
- Byp. US 71 – Platte City, Missouri
- City US 71 – Faucett to St. Joseph, Missouri
- Bus. US 71 – St. Joseph to Savannah, Missouri
- Bus. US 71 – Maryville, Missouri
- Bus. US 71 – Clarinda, Iowa
- Bus. US 71 – Storm Lake, Iowa
- Bus. US 71 – Willmar, Minnesota
- Byp. US 71 – Willmar, Minnesota

=== US 72 ===
- Bus. US 72 – Tuscumbia, Alabama
- Alt. US 72 – Muscle Shoals to Huntsville, Alabama
- Bus. US 72 – Athens, Alabama
- Bus. US 72 – Scottsboro, Alabama

=== US 73 ===
- Alt. US 73 – Kansas City, Kansas
- Truck US 73 – Leavenworth, Kansas

=== US 74 ===
- US 74A - Asheville to Forest City, North Carolina
- US 74A - Rutherfordton, North Carolina
- Bus. US 74 - Rutherfordton to Mooresboro, North Carolina, via Forest City
- US 74A - Shelby, North Carolina
- Bus. US 74 - Shelby, North Carolina
- Byp. US 74 - Shelby, North Carolina
- Bus. US 74 - Kings Mountain, North Carolina
- US 74A - Bessemer City, North Carolina
- Byp. US 74 - Stallings to Wingate, North Carolina
- US 74A (1949–1952) - Monroe, North Carolina
- US 74A (1952–1954) - Monroe, North Carolina
- US 74A - Rockingham, North Carolina
- Bus. US 74 - Rockingham to Hamlet, North Carolina
- Bus. US 74 - Laurinburg to Maxton, North Carolina
- Alt. US 74 - Maxton to Lumberton, North Carolina
- Bus. US 74 - Chadbourn to Whiteville, North Carolina
- Temp. US 74 - Chadbourn, North Carolina
- US 74A - Leland, North Carolina
- US 74A - Wrightsville Beach, North Carolina

=== US 75 ===
- Temp. US 75 - Galveston to Houston, Texas
- Bus. US 75 - Houston, Texas
- Bus. US 75 - Sherman to Denison, Texas
- Bus. US 75 - Durant, Oklahoma
- Bus. US 75 - Henryetta, Oklahoma
- Alt. US 75 - Beggs to Sapulpa, Oklahoma
- Temp. US 75 - Oakhurst to Owasso, Oklahoma
- Temp. US 75 - Oakhurst to Owasso, Oklahoma
- Bus. US 75 - Tulsa, Oklahoma
- Bus. US 75 - Altoona, Kansas
- Alt. US 75 - Wakarusa to North Topeka, Kansas
- Bus. US 75 - Topeka, Kansas
- Byp. US 75 - Topeka, Kansas
- Alt. US 75 - North Topeka to Hoyt, Kansas
- Bus. US 75 - Nebraska City, Nebraska
- Bus. US 75 - Sioux City, Iowa
- Bus. US 75 - Le Mars, Iowa

=== US 76 ===
- Bus. US 76 – Dalton, Georgia
- Truck US 76 – Ringgold, Georgia
- Alt. US 76 – Long Creek, South Carolina
- Bus. US 76 – Seneca, South Carolina
- Bus. US 76 – Laurens, South Carolina
- Bus. US 76 – Newberry, South Carolina
- Byp. US 76 – Newberry, South Carolina
- Alt. US 76 – Columbia, South Carolina
- Conn. US 76 – Columbia, South Carolina
- Bus. US 76 – Sumter, South Carolina
- Byp. US 76 – Sumter, South Carolina
- Alt. US 76 – Mayesville, South Carolina
- Alt. US 76 – Florence County, South Carolina
- Conn. US 76 – Florence, South Carolina
- Alt. US 76 – Marion, South Carolina
- Bus. US 76 – Chadbourn to Whiteville, North Carolina
- Temp. US 76 - Chadbourn, North Carolina

=== US 77 ===
- Bus. US 77-Z – Brownsville, Texas
- Bus. US 77-X – Harlingen, Texas
- Bus. US 77-W – Sebastian to Raymondville, Texas
- Bus. US 77-V II – Riviera, Texas
- Bus. US 77-V – Kingsville to Bishop, Texas
- Bus. US 77-U – Driscoll, Texas
- Bus. US 77-U II – Robstown, Texas
- Bus. US 77-T – Sinton, Texas
- Alt. US 77 – Refugio to Hallettsville, Texas
- Bus. US 77-S – Victoria, Texas
- Alt. Bus. US 77-Q – Yoakum, Texas
- Bus. US 77-L – Waco to Lacy Lakeview, Texas
- Bus. US 77-H – Dallas, Texas
- Bus. US 77 – Ardmore, Oklahoma
- Alt. US 77 – Oklahoma City, Oklahoma
- Bus. US 77 – Perry, Oklahoma
- Alt. US 77 – Ponca City, Oklahoma
- Bus. US 77 – Ponca City, Oklahoma
- City US 77 – Ponca City, Oklahoma
- Bus. US 77 – Arkansas City, Kansas
- Byp. US 77 – Arkansas City, Kansas
- Truck US 77 – Arkansas City, Kansas
- Bus. US 77 – Herington, Kansas
- Bus. US 77 – Junction City, Kansas

=== US 78 ===
- Bus. US 78 – Red Banks, Mississippi
- Bus. US 78 – Hickory Flat, Mississippi
- Alt. US 78 – Hamilton to Graysville, Alabama
- Alt. US 78 – Carbon Hill to Jasper, Alabama
- Alt. US 78 – Birmingham to Irondale, Alabama
- Truck US 78 – Birmingham, Alabama
- Truck US 78 – Leeds, Alabama
- Bus. US 78 – Anniston, Alabama
- Alt. US 78 – Heflin, Alabama, to Villa Rica, Georgia
- Bus. US 78 – Athens, Georgia
- Bus. US 78 – Washington, Georgia
- Alt. US 78 – Aiken, South Carolina
- Truck US 78 – Aiken, South Carolina
- Alt. US 78 – Williston, South Carolina
- Conn. US 78 – Blackville, South Carolina
- Bus. US 78 – Blackville, South Carolina
- Conn. US 78 - Southwest of Branchville, South Carolina

=== US 79 ===
- Bus. US 79-A – Austin, Texas
- Bus. US 79-B – Taylor, Texas
- Bus. US 79-F – Henderson, Texas
- Bus. US 79-G – Carthage, Texas
- Truck US 79 – Minden, Louisiana
- Byp. US 79 – Homer, Louisiana
- US 79B – Magnolia, Arkansas
- US 79C – McNeil, Arkansas
- US 79B – Camden, Arkansas
- US 79B – Bearden, Arkansas
- Alt. US 79 – Thornton to Fordyce, Arkansas
- US 79B – Thornton, Arkansas
- US 79B – Fordyce, Arkansas
- US 79B – Pine Bluff to Altheimer, Arkansas
- US 79B – Stuttgart, Arkansas
- US 79C – Stuttgart, Arkansas
- Bus. US 79 – Clarendon, Arkansas
- Bus. US 79 – Brownsville, Tennessee
- Byp. US 79 – Humboldt, Tennessee

=== US 80 ===
- Bus. US 80 - San Diego, California
- Bus. US 80 - Winterhaven, California to Yuma, Arizona
- Alt. US 80 - Phoenix, Arizona
- Alt. US 80 - Phoenix, Arizona
- Byp. US 80 - Phoenix, Arizona
- Bus. US 80 - Tucson, Arizona
- Truck US 80 - Tombstone, Arizona
- Temp. US 80 - Sierra Vista to Bisbee, Arizona
- Alt. US 80 - Las Cruces to Anthony, New Mexico
- Alt. US 80 - El Paso, Texas
- Bus. US 80 - El Paso, Texas
- Bus. US 80 - Sierra Blanca, Texas
- Bus. US 80 - Van Horn, Texas
- Bus. US 80 - Odessa to Midland, Texas
- Bus. US 80 - Big Spring, Texas
- Bus. US 80 - Colorado City, Texas
- Bus. US 80 - Sweetwater, Texas
- Alt. US 80 - Abilene to Weatherford, Texas
- Bus. US 80 - Abilene, Texas
- Bus. US 80 - Fort Worth, Texas
- Bus. US 80 - Dallas, Texas
- Truck US 80 - Minden, Louisiana
- Truck US 80 - Gibsland, Louisiana
- Truck US 80 - Arcadia, Louisiana
- Bus. US 80 - Meridian, Mississippi
- Bus. US 80 - Selma, Alabama
- Truck US 80 - Selma, Alabama
- Bus. US 80 - Montgomery, Alabama
- Temp. US 80 - Columbus to Crystal Valley, Georgia
- Toll US 80 - Savannah to Whitemarsh Island, Georgia

=== US 81 ===
- Bus. US 81 - Lytle, Texas
- Bus. US 81 - San Antonio, Texas (split into two pieces)
- Bus. US 81 - Austin, Texas
- Bus. US 81 - Waco, Texas
- Alt. US 81 - Fort Worth, Texas
- Bus. US 81 - Fort Worth, Texas
- Bus. US 81 - Rhome, Texas
- Bus. US 81 - Decatur, Texas
- Bus. US 81 - Alvord, Texas
- Alt. US 81 - Waurika, Oklahoma
- City US 81 - Duncan, Oklahoma
- Bus. US 81 - Rush Springs, Oklahoma
- Byp. US 81 - Wichita, Kansas
- Truck US 81 - Wichita, Kansas
- Bus. US 81 - McPherson, Kansas
- Byp. US 81 - McPherson, Kansas – now K-153, but county-installed street signs still reference Byp. US 81.
- Bus. US 81 - Lindsborg, Kansas
- Alt. US 81 - Salina to Minneapolis, Kansas
- City US 81 - Salina, Kansas
- Bus. US 81 - Fargo, North Dakota
- Bus. US 81 - Grand Forks, North Dakota

=== US 82 ===
- Truck US 82 - Artesia, New Mexico
- Truck US 82 - Lovington, New Mexico
- Bus. US 82 - Wolfforth, Texas
- Bus. US 82 - Holliday, Texas
- Bus. US 82 - Wichita Falls, Texas
- Bus. US 82 - Paris, Texas
- Bus. US 82 - Clarksville, Texas
- Bus. US 82 - Avery, Texas
- US 82T - Stamps, Arkansas
- US 82B - Magnolia, Arkansas
- US 82B - El Dorado, Arkansas
- US 82S - Felsenthal National Wildlife Refuge in Ashley County, Arkansas
- US 82B - Montrose, Arkansas
- US 82S - Montrose, Arkansas
- Bus. US 82 - Eupora, Mississippi
- Byp. US 82 - Tuscaloosa, Alabama
- Alt. US 82 - Montgomery to Prattville, Alabama
- Bus. US 82 - Montgomery, Alabama
- Byp. US 82 (1961–1965) - Montgomery, Alabama
- Byp. US 82 (1965–1975) - Montgomery, Alabama
- City US 82 - Montgomery, Alabama
- Truck US 82 - Montgomery, Alabama
- Bus. US 82 - Albany, Georgia

=== US 83 ===
- Bus. US 83 – Harlingen to Peñitas, Texas, via McAllen, Texas
- Bus. US 83 – San Ygnacio, Texas
- Bus. US 83 – Laredo, Texas
- Temp. US 83 – Uvalde to Junction, Texas
- Temp. US 83 – Big Paint to Junction, Texas
- Bus. US 83 – Abilene, Texas
- Bus. US 83 – Garden City, Kansas
- Spur US 83 – Garden City, Kansas
- Byp. US 83 – Oakley, Kansas
- Bus. US 83 – Pierre, South Dakota
- Byp. US 83 – Pierre, South Dakota
- Bus. US 83 – Minot, North Dakota
- Byp. US 83 – Minot, North Dakota

=== US 84 ===
- Bus. US 84 – Slaton, Texas
- Bus. US 84 – Snyder, Texas
- Bus. US 84 – Hermleigh, Texas
- Bus. US 84 – Roscoe, Texas
- Bus. US 84 – Abilene, Texas
- Bus. US 84 – Waco, Texas
- Bus. US 84 – Teague, Texas
- Bus. US 84 – Natchez, Mississippi
- Bus. US 84 – Enterprise, Alabama
- Truck US 84 – Enterprise, Alabama
- Bus. US 84 – Dothan, Alabama
- Bus. US 84 – Bainbridge, Georgia
- Bus. US 84 – Thomasville, Georgia

=== US 85 ===
- Bus. US 85 – El Paso, Texas
- Alt. US 85 – Anthony to Las Cruces, New Mexico
- Byp. US 85 – Santa Fe, New Mexico
- Alt. US 85 – Barelas to Alameda, New Mexico
- Byp. US 85 – Fountain to Colorado Springs, Colorado
- Bus. US 85 – Brighton, Colorado
- Bus. US 85 – Fort Lupton, Colorado
- Bus. US 85 – Platteville, Colorado
- Bus. US 85 – Greeley, Colorado
- Alt. US 85 – Mule Creek Junction, Wyoming to Lead, South Dakota
- Truck US 85 – Lead to Deadwood, South Dakota
- Byp. US 85 – Pierre, South Dakota
- Bus. US 85 - Watford City, North Dakota
- Bus. US 85 - Alexander, North Dakota
- Bus. US 85 – Williston, North Dakota
- US 85B – Williams County, North Dakota

=== US 87 ===
- Bus. US 87 - Stockdale, Texas
- Bus. US 87 - San Antonio, Texas
- Bus. US 87 - Big Spring, Texas
- Bus. US 87 - Lamesa, Texas
- Bus. US 87 - Woodrow, Texas
- Bus. US 87 - Lubbock, Texas
- Bus. US 87 - New Deal, Texas
- Bus. US 87 - Plainview, Texas
- Bus. US 87 - Dalhart, Texas
- Temp. US 87 - Denver, Colorado
- Bus. US 87 - Cheyenne, Wyoming
- Bus. US 87 - Wheatland, Wyoming
- Bus. US 87 - Douglas, Wyoming
- Bus. US 87 - Casper, Wyoming
- Bus. US 87 - Buffalo, Wyoming
- Bus. US 87 - Sheridan, Wyoming
- Byp. US 87 - Great Falls, Montana
- Byp. US 87 - Lewistown, Montana

=== US 89 ===
- Bus. US 89 – Florence, Arizona
- US 89A – Prescott, Arizona
- US 89A – Prescott to Flagstaff, Arizona
- Spur US 89A – Prescott, Arizona
- Temp. US 89 – Prescott, Arizona
- Truck US 89 – Prescott, Arizona
- Spur US 89 – Flagstaff, Arizona
- Temp. US 89 – Cameron to Cedar Ridge, Arizona
- Truck US 89 – Cameron, Arizona
- US 89T – Northwest of Tuba City to Page, Arizona
- Bus. US 89 – Page, Arizona
- Spur US 89 – Page, Arizona
- US 89A – Bitter Springs, Arizona to Kanab, Utah
- US 89A – Salt Lake City
- US 89A – North Salt Lake to Farmington, Utah
- Temp. US 89 – Garden City, Utah to Hoback, Wyoming
- Byp. US 89 – Great Falls, Montana

=== US 90 ===
- Alt. US 90 - Seguin to Houston, Texas
- Bus. US 90 - Houston to Barrett, Texas
- Bus. US 90 - Beaumont, Texas
- Bus. US 90 - Houston, Texas
- Byp. US 90 - Houston, Texas
- Bus. US 90 - Orange to Pinehurst, Texas
- Bus. US 90 - Lake Charles, Louisiana
- Bus. US 90 - Lafayette, Louisiana
- Bus. US 90 - Morgan City to Amelia, Louisiana
- Bus. US 90 - Avondale to New Orleans, Louisiana
- Alt. US 90 - Prichard to Mobile, Alabama
- Truck US 90 - Mobile, Alabama
- Alt. US 90 - northwest of Pensacola to Ferry Pass, Florida
- Alt. US 90 - Quincy to Tallahassee, Florida
- Alt. US 90 - Jacksonville, Florida

=== US 91 ===
- Bus. US 91 – Corona to Riverside, California
- Bus. US 91 – Colton to San Bernardino, California
- Bus. US 91 – Victorville, California
- Alt. US 91 – Jean to Las Vegas, Nevada
- Alt. US 91 – Salt Lake City, Utah
- Alt. US 91 – North Salt Lake to Farmington, Utah
- Alt. US 91 – North Salt Lake to Ogden, Utah
- Bus. US 91 – McCammon, Idaho
- Bus. US 91 – Inkom, Idaho
- Bus. US 91 – Pocatello, Idaho
- Bus. US 91 – Blackfoot, Idaho
- Bus. US 91 – Idaho Falls, Idaho
- Byp. US 91 – Butte, Montana
- Bus. US 91 – Helena, Montana

=== US 92 ===
- Bus. US 92 - Lakeland, Florida
- Truck US 92 - Kissimmee, Florida
- Truck US 92 - Winter Park to Maitland, Florida

=== US 93 ===
- Spur US 93 - Kingman, Arizona
- Alt. US 93 - Kingman, Arizona
- Truck US 93 - Kingman, Arizona to Boulder City, Nevada
- Bus. US 93 - Boulder City, Nevada
- Truck US 93 - Boulder City, Nevada
- Alt. US 93 - Lages Station to Wells, Nevada, via West Wendover
- Alt. US 93 - Shoshone to Challis, Idaho, via Arco
- Alt. US 93 - Kalispell, Montana

=== US 95 ===
- Truck US 95 - San Luis, Arizona
- Spur US 95 - Parker, Arizona
- Alt. US 95 - Las Vegas, Nevada
- Bus. US 95 - Las Vegas, Nevada
- Truck US 95 - Hawthorne, Nevada
- Spur US 95 - Fernley, Nevada
- Alt. US 95 - Schurz to north of Fallon, Nevada via Yerington, Silver Springs, and Fernley, Nevada
- Spur US 95 - Payette, Idaho
- Spur US 95 – Weiser Junction, Oregon to Weiser, Idaho
- Bus. US 95 - Cottonwood, Idaho
- Bus. US 95 - Craigmont, Idaho
- Bus. US 95 - Winchester, Idaho
- Spur US 95 - Lewiston, Idaho
- Bus. US 95 - Potlatch to St. Maries, Idaho
- Alt. US 95 - Potlach to Wolf Lodge, Idaho, via St. Maries
- Bus. US 95 - Bonners Ferry, Idaho

=== US 96 ===
- Bus. US 96 – Silsbee, Texas
- Bus. US 96 – Buna, Texas

=== US 97 ===
- Bus. US 97 - Klamath Falls, Oregon
- Bus. US 97 - Bend, Oregon
- Bus. US 97 - Redmond, Oregon
- Alt. US 97 - Toppenish to Union Gap, Washington
- Bus. US 97 - Cashmere, Washington
- Alt. US 97 - Wenatchee to Chelan, Washington
- Spur US 97 - Orondo, Washington
- Bus. US 97 - Okanogan to Omak, Washington

=== US 98 ===
- Bus. US 98 – Natchez, Mississippi
- Bus. US 98 – Summit to McComb, Mississippi
- Truck US 98 – Mobile, Alabama
- Truck US 98 – Spanish Fort, Alabama
- Alt. US 98 – Fairhope to Barnwell, Alabama
- Alt. US 98 – Pensacola, Florida
- Bus. US 98 – Pensacola, Florida
- Toll US 98 – Pensacola to Navarre, Florida
- Alt. US 98 – Panama City Beach, Florida – now only State Road 30
- Byp. US 98 – Panama City Beach, Florida
- Bus. US 98 – Panama City to Parker, Florida
- Temp. US 98 – Wakulla to Perry, Florida
- Truck US 98 – Brooksville, Florida
- Bus. US 98 – Dade City, Florida
- Truck US 98 – Dade City, Florida
- Bus. US 98 – Lakeland, Florida
- Bus. US 98 – Bartow, Florida
- Temp. US 98 – Okeechobee to West Palm Beach, Florida

=== US 99 ===
- Bus. US 99 – Banning, California
- Bus. US 99 – Pomona, California
- Bus. US 99 – Elysian Park to Sylmar, California
- Bus. US 99 – Fresno, California
- Bus. US 99 – Merced, California
- Bus. US 99 – Atwater, California
- Alt. US 99 – Sacramento to Red Bluff, California
- Bus. US 99 – Sacramento, California
- Bus. US 99 – Gold Hill, Oregon
- Bus. US 99 – Green, Oregon
- Bus. US 99 – Roseburg, Oregon
- Alt. US 99 – Junction City to Portland, Oregon
- Bus. US 99 – Salem, Oregon
- Byp. US 99 – Salem, Oregon
- US 99T – Tukwila, Washington
- Alt. US 99 – Riverton Heights to Seattle, Washington
- Alt. US 99 – Georgetown to Seattle, Washington
- Bus. US 99 – Seattle
- Byp. US 99 – Seattle
- Alt. US 99 – Fairmont to Everett, Washington
- Alt. US 99 – Burlington to Bellingham, Washington
- Alt. US 99 – Bellingham, Washington to the Canada–US border

=== US 101 ===
- Bus. US 101 – Chula Vista to National City, California
- Bus. US 101 – San Diego
- Alt. US 101 – Capistrano Beach to Oxnard, California
- Bus. US 101 – Buena Park, California
- Bus. US 101 – Anaheim, California
- Alt. US 101 – Long Beach, California
- Bus. US 101 – Los Angeles
- Byp. US 101 – Anaheim to Los Angeles, California
- Alt. US 101 – Santa Monica, California
- Bus. US 101 – Universal City to Woodland Hills, California
- Bus. US 101 – Ventura, California
- Bus. US 101 – Santa Maria, California
- Bus. US 101 – Arroyo Grande, California
- Bus. US 101 – Paso Robles, California
- Bus. US 101 – King City, California
- Bus. US 101 – Greenfield, California
- Bus. US 101 – Soledad, California
- Bus. US 101 – Gonzales, California
- Bus. US 101 – Salinas, California
- Bus. US 101 – Gilroy to San Jose, California
- Byp. US 101 – San Jose to San Francisco, California
- Alt. US 101 – San Francisco, California
- Bus. US 101 – Novato, California
- Bus. US 101 – Petaluma, California
- Bus. US 101 – Santa Rosa, California
- Bus. US 101 – Cloverdale, California
- Bus. US 101 – Ukiah, California
- Bus. US 101 – Rio Dell, California
- Bus. US 101 – Fortuna, California
- Bus. US 101 – McKinleyville, California
- Bus. US 101 – Warrenton to Astoria, Oregon
- Alt. US 101 – Ilwaco, Washington
- Alt. US 101 – Long Beach, Washington
- Truck US 101 – Port Angeles, Washington

== US 102 – US 199 ==
=== US 104 ===
- Alt. US 104 – Niagara Falls, New York

=== US 111 ===
- Alt. US 111 – Parkton, Maryland to York, Pennsylvania

=== US 112 ===
- US 112S – Rolling Prairie, Indiana to Union, Michigan
- Bus. US 112 – Niles, Michigan
- Bus. US 112 – Ypsilanti, Michigan
- Byp. US 112 – Ypsilanti, Michigan

=== US 113 ===
- Bus. US 113 – Snow Hill, Maryland
- Alt. US 113 – Little Heaven to Dover, Delaware

=== US 117 ===
- Temp. US 117 - Wilmington to Castle Hayne, North Carolina
- Alt. US 17 - Burgaw, North Carolina
- Bus. US 117 - Burgaw, North Carolina
- Conn. US 17 - Calypso, North Carolina
- Bus. US 117 - Calypso to Mount Olive, North Carolina
- Alt. US 117 - Calypso to Brogden, North Carolina
- Conn. US 117 - Calypso, North Carolina
- Alt. US 117 - Goldsboro, North Carolina
- Bus. US 117 - Goldsboro, North Carolina
- Alt. US 117 - Goldsboro to Wilson, North Carolina

=== US 119 ===
- Spur US 119 – Williamson, West Virginia
- Spur US 119 – Charleston, West Virginia
- Truck US 119 – Uniontown, Pennsylvania
- Alt. US 119 – Greensburg, Pennsylvania

=== US 123 ===
- Bus. US 123 – Seneca, South Carolina
- Bus. US 123 – Easley, South Carolina
- Conn. US 123 – Easley, South Carolina
- Alt. US 123 – Easley to Greenville, South Carolina

=== US 127 ===
- Bus. US 127 - Albany, Kentucky
- Bus. US 127 - Jamestown, Kentucky
- Bus. US 127 - Hustonville, Kentucky
- Byp. US 127 - Danville, Kentucky
- Byp. US 127 - Harrodsburg, Kentucky
- Byp. US 127 - Lawrenceburg, Kentucky
- Truck US 127 - Cincinnati, Ohio
- Alt. US 127 - Hamilton, Ohio
- Bus. US 127 - Greenville, Ohio
- Bus. US 127 - Summit Township to Blackman Charter Township, Michigan
- Bus. US 127 - Mason, Michigan
- Bus. US 127 - Lansing to DeWitt Charter Township, Michigan
- Bus. US 127 - Olive Township to Bingham Township, Michigan
- Bus. US 127 - Ithaca, Michigan
- Bus. US 127 - Alma, Michigan
- Bus. US 127 - St. Louis to Pine River Township, Michigan
- Bus. US 127 - Union Charter Township to Mount Pleasant, Michigan
- Bus. US 127 - Vernon Township to Clare, Michigan
- Bus. US 127 - Hayes Township to Harrison, Michigan

=== US 129 ===
- Alt. US 129 - Old Town to Branford, Florida
- Temp. US 129 - Branford to Live Oak, Florida
- Bus. US 129 - Hawkinsville, Georgia
- Alt. US 129 - Hawkinsville to Macon, Georgia, via Cochran
- Bus. US 129 - Eatonton, Georgia
- Byp. US 129 - Madison, Georgia
- Bus. US 129 - Watkinsville, Georgia
- Bus. US 129 - Arcade to Jefferson, Georgia
- Alt. US 129 - Jefferson, Georgia
- Bus. US 129 - Gainesville, Georgia
- Byp. US 129 - Gainesville, Georgia
- Byp. US 129 - Cleveland, Georgia
- Truck US 129 - Blairsville, Georgia

=== US 130 ===
- Alt. US 130 – New Brunswick, New Jersey
- Alt. US 130 – Bridgeport to Thorofare, New Jersey

=== US 131 ===
- Bus. US 131 - Constantine Township to Constantine, Michigan
- Bus. US 131 - Three Rivers, Michigan
- Bus. US 131 - Kalamazoo, Michigan
- Bus. US 131 - Grand Rapids, Michigan
- Byp. US 131 - Grand Rapids to Plainfield Township, Michigan
- Bus. US 131 - Big Rapids Township to Big Rapids, Michigan
- Bus. US 131 - Cadillac, Michigan
- Bus. US 131 - Cedar Creek Township to Liberty Township, Michigan

=== US 136 ===
- Bus. US 136 – Albany, Missouri
- Bus. US 136 – Memphis, Missouri
- Spur US 136 – Arbela, Missouri
- Bus. US 136 – Kahoka, Missouri
- Spur US 136 – Wayland, Missouri

=== US 141 ===
- Bus. US 141 – Sheboygan, Wisconsin
- Bus. US 141 – Manitowoc, Wisconsin
- Bus. US 141 – Coleman to Pound, Wisconsin

=== US 150 ===
- Bus. US 150 - Peoria, Illinois
- City US 150 - Peoria, Illinois
- Bus. US 150 - Champaign, Illinois
- Temp. US 150 - Ogden to Paris, Illinois
- Truck US 150 - Louisville, Kentucky
- Truck US 150 - Bardstown, Kentucky
- Bus. US 150 - Springfield, Kentucky
- Bus. US 150 - Danville, Kentucky
- Byp. US 150 - Danville, Kentucky
- Bus. US 150 - Stanford, Kentucky
- Byp. US 150 - Stanford, Kentucky

=== US 151 ===
- Bus. US 151 – Cedar Rapids to Marion, Iowa
- Bus. US 151 – Monticello, Iowa
- Bus. US 151 – Cascade, Iowa
- Bus. US 151 – Platteville, Wisconsin
- Bus. US 151 – Mineral Point, Wisconsin
- Bus. US 151 – Dodgeville, Wisconsin
- Bus. US 151 – Mount Horeb, Wisconsin
- Bus. US 151 – Verona, Wisconsin
- Bus. US 151 – Sun Prairie, Wisconsin
- Bus. US 151 – Columbus, Wisconsin
- Bus. US 151 – Beaver Dam, Wisconsin
- Bus. US 151 – Waupun, Wisconsin

=== US 154 ===
- Spur US 154 - Dodge City, Kansas

=== US 158 ===
- Bus. US 158 – Winston-Salem, North Carolina
- US 158A – Oxford, North Carolina
- Bus. US 158 – Oxford, North Carolina
- US 158A – Henderson, North Carolina
- Bus. US 158 – Henderson, North Carolina
- US 158A – Warrenton, North Carolina
- Bus. US 158 – Warrenton, North Carolina
- Bus. US 158 – Murfreesboro, North Carolina
- US 158A – Gatesville, North Carolina
- Bus. US 158 – Gatesville, North Carolina
- Bus. US 158 – Nags Head to Kill Devil Hills, North Carolina

=== US 160 ===
- Bus. US 160 – Mancos, Colorado
- Bus. US 160 – Durango, Colorado
- Bus. US 160 – Bayfield, Colorado
- Bus. US 160 – Willard, Missouri
- City US 160 – Springfield, Missouri

=== US 165 ===
- Bus. US 165 – Alexandria to Pineville, Louisiana
- Byp. US 165 – Alexandria, Louisiana
- Bus. US 165 – south of Richwood to Monroe, Louisiana
- Byp. US 165 – Monroe, Louisiana
- US 165C – Gillett, Arkansas
- US 165B – Gillett, Arkansas

=== US 166 ===
- Bus. US 166 – Sedan, Kansas
- Bus. US 166 – Joplin, Missouri
- Bus. US 166 – Springfield, Missouri
- City US 166 – Springfield, Missouri
- Truck US 166 – Springfield, Missouri

=== US 167 ===
- Bus. US 167 – Alexandria, Louisiana
- US 167B – El Dorado, Arkansas
- US 167B – Sheridan, Arkansas
- US 167B – Thornton, Arkansas

=== US 169 ===
- Temp. US 169 – Tulsa, Oklahoma
- Alt. US 169 – Nowata, Oklahoma
- Bus. US 169 – Garnett, Kansas
- Alt. US 169 – Kansas City, Kansas to Northmoor, Missouri
- Spur US 169 – Smithville, Missouri
- Bus. US 169 – Fort Dodge, Iowa
- Bus. US 169 – Hibbing, Minnesota
- Bus. US 169 – Chisholm, Minnesota

=== US 171 ===
- Bus. US 171 – Zwolle, Louisiana

=== US 175 ===
- Bus. US 175 – Crandall, Texas
- Bus. US 175 – Kemp, Texas
- Bus. US 175 – Mabank, Texas
- Bus. US 175 – Athens, Texas
- Bus. US 175 - Poynor, Texas

=== US 176 ===
- Alt. US 176 – Inman, South Carolina
- Alt. US 176 – Spartanburg, South Carolina
- Conn. US 176 – Spartanburg, South Carolina
- Conn. US 176 – Spartanburg, South Carolina
- Bus. US 176 – Union, South Carolina
- Conn. US 176 – Union, South Carolina
- Conn. US 176 – Whitmire, South Carolina

=== US 178 ===
- Conn. US 178 – Northlake, South Carolina
- Bus. US 178 – Greenwood, South Carolina
- Byp. US 178 – Greenwood, South Carolina
- Conn. US 178 – Saluda, South Carolina
- Alt. US 178 – Stedman, South Carolina
- Bus. US 178 – Orangeburg, South Carolina
- Byp. US 178 – Orangeburg, South Carolina
- Conn. US 178 – Orangeburg, South Carolina

=== US 180 ===
- Alt. US 180 – Hunt to St. Johns, Arizona
- Bus. US 180 – Eagar, Arizona
- Bus. US 180 – El Paso, Texas
- Bus. US 180 – Fort Worth, Texas

=== US 181 ===
- Bus. US 181 – Beeville, Texas
- Bus. US 181 – Kenedy, Texas (south)
- Bus. US 181 – Kenedy, Texas (north)
- Bus. US 181 – Karnes City, Texas (south)
- Bus. US 181 – Karnes City, Texas (north)

=== US 183 ===
- Bus. US 183 - Gonzales, Texas
- Bus. US 183 - Austin, Texas
- 183A Toll Road - Austin to Leander, Texas
- Temp. US 183 - Baird to Albany, Texas
- Truck US 183 - Cisco, Texas
- Bus. US 183 - Seymour, Texas
- Alt. US 183 - Clinton, Oklahoma
- Alt. US 183 - Hays to Big Creek, Kansas
- Byp. US 183 - Hays, Kansas

=== US 189 ===
- Alt. US 189 – Hailstone to Wanship, Utah
- Bus. US 189 – Evanston, Wyoming

=== US 190 ===
- Bus. US 190 – Copperas Cove, Texas
- Bus. US 190 – Killeen to Harker Heights, Texas
- Bus. US 190 – Heidenheimer, Texas
- Bus. US 190 – Baton Rouge, Louisiana
- Byp. US 190 – Baton Rouge, Louisiana
- Bus. US 190 – Covington, Louisiana
- Bus. US 190 – Slidell, Louisiana

=== US 191 ===
- Bus. US 191 – Douglas, Arizona
- Spur US 191 – Willcox, Arizona
- Spur US 191 – Bowie, Arizona
- Spur US 191 – Luzena, Arizona
- Spur US 191 – Safford, Arizona
- Temp. US 191 – Clifton to Stargo, Arizona
- Bus. US 191 – Helper, Utah
- Bus. US 191 – Lewistown, Montana

=== US 195 ===
- Spur US 195 – north of Clarkston, Washington to Idaho state line, north of the Clarkston, Washington–Lewiston, Idaho line
- Bus. US 195 – Rosalia, Washington

== US 200 – US 299 ==
=== US 201 ===
- US 201A – Skowhegan to Solon, Maine
- US 201A – Wheeler Hill to Richmond Corner, Maine

=== US 202 ===
- Truck US 202 – Norristown, Pennsylvania
- Alt. Truck US 202 - Whitpain Township to Montgomery Township, Pennsylvania
- Bus. US 202 - Montgomeryville to Doylestown, Pennsylvania
- Temp. US 202 - Flemington to Bedminster, New Jersey
- Alt. US 202 - Philipstown, New York
- Alt. US 202 - Danbury to Bethel, Connecticut
- Byp. US 202 - Athol, Massachusetts
- Alt. US 202 - East Northwood to Rochester, New Hampshire

=== US 206 ===
- Byp. US 206 – Hillsborough Township, New Jersey

=== US 209 ===
- Truck US 209 - Pottsville to Tamaqua, Pennsylvania
- Truck US 209 - Kresgeville to Brodheadsville, Pennsylvania
- Bus. US 209 - Sciota to Marshalls Creek, Pennsylvania, via Stroudsburg
- Truck US 209 - East Stroudsburg to Marshalls Creek, Pennsylvania

=== US 211 ===
- Bus. US 211 – Luray, Virginia
- Bus. US 211 – Washington, Virginia
- Alt. US 211 – Warrenton to New Baltimore, Virginia
- Bus. US 211 – Warrenton, Virginia

=== US 212 ===
- Byp. US 212 - Billings, Montana
- Bus. US 212 - Belle Fourche, South Dakota

=== US 218 ===
- Bus. US 218 – Charles City, Iowa
- Bus. US 218 – Waverly, Iowa
- Bus. US 218 – Mount Pleasant, Iowa

=== US 219 ===
- Bus. US 219 – Chestnut Ridge, Maryland
- Bus. US 219 – Meyersdale, Pennsylvania
- Alt. US 219 – Carrolltown to Mahaffey, Pennsylvania
- Truck US 219 – Ridgway, Pennsylvania
- Bus. US 219 – southeast of Carrollton to Salamanca, New York

=== US 220 ===
- Bus. US 220 - Ellerbe, North Carolina
- Alt. US 220 - Emery to Seagrove, North Carolina
- Bus. US 220 - South of Ulah to Level Cross, North Carolina, via Asheboro
- Bus. US 220 - Madison to Mayodan, North Carolina
- Bus. US 220 - Ridgeway, Virginia
- Bus. US 220 - Martinsville to Collinsville, Virginia
- Alt. US 220 - Rocky Mount, Virginia
- Bus. US 220 - Rocky Mount, Virginia
- Alt. US 220 - Roanoke, Virginia
- Bus. US 220 - Roanoke, Virginia
- Bus. US 220 - Clifton Forge, Virginia
- Truck US 220 - La Vale to Cresaptown, Maryland, southbound only, following MD 658 and MD 53
- Bus. US 220 - Bedford, Pennsylvania
- Bus. US 220 - south of Claysburg to Tyrone, Pennsylvania
- Alt. US 220 - Port Matilda to Milesburg, Pennsylvania
- Truck US 220 - Williamsport, Pennsylvania

=== US 221 ===
- Truck US 221 - Perry, Florida
- Truck US 221 - Hazlehurst, Georgia
- Byp. US 221 - Greenwood, South Carolina
- Bus. US 221 - Greenwood, South Carolina
- Truck US 221 - Laurens, South Carolina
- Alt. US 221 - Chesnee, South Carolina to Rutherfordton, North Carolina
- Conn. US 221 - Chesnee, South Carolina
- Conn. US 221 - Chesnee, South Carolina
- Bus. US 221 - Marion, North Carolina
- Truck US 221 - Linville to Boone, North Carolina
- Bus. US 221 - West Jefferson to Jefferson, North Carolina
- Bus. US 221 - Bedford, Virginia

=== US 222 ===
- Bus. US 222 - Reading, Pennsylvania
- Truck US 222 - Perryville to Conowingo, Maryland

=== US 223 ===
- Bus. US 223 – Adrian, Michigan

=== US 224 ===
- Bus. US 224 – Van Wert, Ohio
- Alt. US 224 – Boardman to Poland, Ohio

=== US 230 ===
- Byp. US 230 – Harrisburg to Highspire, Pennsylvania

=== US 231 ===
- Bus. US 231 – Dothan, Alabama
- Bus. US 231 – Ozark, Alabama
- Bus. US 231 – Montgomery, Alabama
- Alt. US 231 – Sylacauga to Pell City, Alabama
- Bus. US 231 – Huntsville, Alabama
- Bus. US 231 - Shelbyville, Tennessee
- Truck US 231 – Shelbyville, Tennessee
- Bus. US 231 (1984) – Bowling Green, Kentucky
- Bus. US 231 (1999–present) – Bowling Green, Kentucky
- Truck US 231 – Morgantown, Kentucky
- Byp. US 231 – Lafayette, Indiana

=== US 240 ===
- Alt. US 240 – Washington, D.C.
- Alt. US 240 – Washington, D.C. to Bethesda, Maryland

=== US 250 ===
- Bus. US 250 – New Philadelphia, Ohio
- Temp. US 250 – Silver Road Junction to Jefferson, Ohio
- Truck US 250 – Philippi, West Virginia
- Truck US 250 – Staunton, Virginia
- Alt. US 250 – Charlottesville, Virginia
- Bus. US 250 – Charlottesville, Virginia
- Byp. US 250 – Charlottesville, Virginia

=== US 258 ===
- Bus. US 258 – Kinston, North Carolina
- Truck US 258 – Snow Hill, North Carolina
- Bus. US 258 – Farmville, North Carolina
- Bus. US 258 – Franklin, Virginia
- Alt. US 258 – Smithfield, Virginia
- Bus. US 258 – Smithfield, Virginia
- Truck US 258 – Smithfield, Virginia

=== US 259 ===
- Bus. US 259 – Kilgore, Texas
- Byp. US 259 – Idabel, Oklahoma

=== US 260 ===
- Alt. US 260 – Springerville to Eagar, Arizona

=== US 264 ===
- Alt. US 264 - west-northwest of Middlesex to Greenville, North Carolina
- Bus. US 264 - Middlesex to Sims, North Carolina
- US 264A - Wilson, North Carolina
- Alt. US 264 - Wilson to Greenville, North Carolina
- Bus. US 264 - Wilson, North Carolina
- US 264A - Farmville, North Carolina
- Alt. US 264 - Farmville to Greenville, North Carolina
- US 264A - Greenville, North Carolina
- Bus. US 264 - Greenville, North Carolina
- US 264A - Belhaven, North Carolina
- Bus. US 264 - Belhaven, North Carolina
- Byp. US 264 - Manns Harbor to Manteo, North Carolina

=== US 270 ===
- Bus. US 270 – Shawnee, Oklahoma
- Bus. US 270 – Wewoka, Oklahoma
- Bus. US 270 – Holdenville, Oklahoma
- US 270B – Hot Springs, Arkansas
- US 270B – Magnet Cove, Arkansas
- US 270B – Malvern, Arkansas

=== US 271 ===
- Bus. US 271 - Pittsburg, Texas
- Bus. US 271 - Mount Pleasant, Texas
- Bus. US 271 - Bogata, Texas
- Bus. US 271 - Deport, Texas
- Bus. US 271 - Paris, Texas
- Bus. US 271 - Hugo, Oklahoma
- Bus. US 271 - Poteau, Oklahoma

=== US 275 ===
- City US 275 – Omaha, Nebraska
- Alt. US 275 – Waterloo to Fremont, Nebraska
- Bus. US 275 – Fremont, Nebraska

=== US 276 ===
- Conn. US 276 – Travelers Rest, South Carolina
- Bus. US 276 – Greenville, South Carolina
- Bus. US 276 – Greenville, South Carolina
- Byp. US 276 – Greenville, South Carolina

=== US 277 ===
- Bus. US 277 – Eagle Pass, Texas
- Spur US 277 – Eagle Pass, Texas
- Spur US 277 – Del Rio, Texas
- Bus. US 277 – Abilene, Texas
- Bus. US 277 – Stamford, Texas
- Bus. US 277 – Haskell, Texas
- Bus. US 277 – Weinert, Texas
- Bus. US 277 – Munday, Texas
- Bus. US 277 – Seymour, Texas
- Bus. US 277 – Holliday, Texas
- Alt. US 277 – Wichita Falls, Texas
- Bus. US 277 – Wichita Falls, Texas

=== US 278 ===
- US 278B – Hope, Arkansas
- US 278B – Camden, Arkansas
- US 278B – Warren, Arkansas
- Bus. US 278 – Piedmont, Alabama
- Bus. US 278 – Rockmart, Georgia
- Truck US 278 – Madison, Georgia
- Byp. US 278 – Warrenton, Georgia
- Truck US 278 – Warrenton, Georgia
- Conn. US 278 – Ridgeland, South Carolina
- Bus. US 278 – Hilton Head Island, South Carolina

=== US 281 ===
- Temp. US 281 – Brownsville to Pharr, Texas
- Spur US 281 – Hidalgo, Texas
- Bus. US 281 – Edinburg, Texas
- Bus. US 281 – Encino, Texas
- Bus. US 281 – Falfurrias, Texas
- Bus. US 281 – Alice, Texas
- Alt. US 281 – southeast of Whitsett to Campbellton, Texas
- Bus. US 281 – Wichita Falls, Texas
- Bus. US 281 – Lawton, Oklahoma
- Spur US 281 – Geary, Oklahoma
- Alt. US 281 – Great Bend, Kansas
- Byp. US 281 – Great Bend, Kansas
- Truck US 281 – Jamestown, North Dakota

=== US 283 ===
- Bus. US 283 – Seymour, Texas
- Spur US 283 – WaKeeney, Kansas

=== US 285 ===
- Alt. US 285 – Artesia to South Springs Acres, New Mexico
- Truck US 285 – Roswell, New Mexico
- Alt. US 285 – Santa Fe, New Mexico
- Byp. US 285 – Santa Fe, New Mexico

=== US 287 ===
- Bus. US 287 – Grapeland, Texas
- Bus. US 287 – Corsicana, Texas
- Bus. US 287 – Ennis, Texas
- Bus. US 287 – Waxahachie, Texas
- Bus. US 287 – Midlothian, Texas
- Bus. US 287 – Mansfield to northwest of Saginaw, Texas
- Bus. US 287 - Rhome, Texas
- Bus. US 287 – Decatur, Texas
- Bus. US 287 – Alvord, Texas
- Bus. US 287 – Wichita Falls to Iowa Park, Texas
- Bus. US 287 – Electra, Texas
- Bus. US 287 – Vernon, Texas
- Bus. US 287 – South Amarillo, Texas
- Bus. US 287 – North Amarillo, Texas
- Bus. US 287 – Rawlins, Wyoming
- Byp. US 287 – Rawlins, Wyoming

=== US 290 ===
- Bus. US 290 – Austin, Texas
- Bus. US 290 – Brenham, Texas
- Bus. US 290 – Hempstead to Hockley, Texas
- Bus. US 290 – Cypress, Texas

== US 300 – US 399 ==
=== US 301 ===
- Bus. US 301 - Dade City, Florida
- Truck US 301 - Dade City, Florida
- Alt. US 301 - Ocala to Citra, Florida
- Alt. US 301 - Starke, Florida
- Byp. US 301 - Statesboro, Georgia
- Bus. US 301 - Sylvania, Georgia
- Conn. US 301 - Alcolu, South Carolina
- Conn. US 301 - Alcolu, South Carolina
- Truck US 301 - Florence, South Carolina
- US 301A - Lumberton, North Carolina
- Bus. US 301 - Lumberton, North Carolina
- US 301A - Fayetteville, North Carolina
- Bus. US 301 - Fayetteville, North Carolina
- US 301A - Wilson, North Carolina
- Bus. US 301 - Wilson, North Carolina
- Bus. US 301 - Elm City, North Carolina
- US 301A - Rocky Mount, North Carolina
- Bus. US 301 - Rocky Mount, North Carolina
- US 301A - Halifax, North Carolina
- Bus. US 301 - Halifax, North Carolina
- Alt. US 301 - Petersburg, Virginia
- Bus. US 301 - Bowling Green, Virginia
- Bus. US 301 - Baltimore
- Truck US 301 - Mount Pleasant to State Road, Delaware

=== US 302 ===
- Bus. US 302 – Bartlett, New Hampshire (signed as new Hampshire Route 16A)

=== US 309 ===
- Truck US 309 - Philadelphia, Pennsylvania
- Alt. US 309 - Allentown, Pennsylvania
- Byp. US 309 - Allentown, Pennsylvania

=== US 311 ===
- Bus. US 311 – southeast of Archdale to High Point, North Carolina

=== US 319 ===
- Alt. US 319 – Crawfordville to Tallahassee, Florida
- Bus. US 319 – Tallahassee, Florida
- Bus. US 319 – Thomasville, Georgia
- Bus. US 319 – Moultrie, Georgia

=== US 321 ===
- Bus. US 321 – Winnsboro Mills to Winnsboro, South Carolina
- Bus. US 321 – Chester, South Carolina
- Alt. US 321 – York, South Carolina
- Bus. US 321 – York, South Carolina
- Bus. US 321 – Dallas to Hickory, North Carolina
- US 321A – Lincolnton, North Carolina
- US 321A – Granite Falls to Lenoir, North Carolina
- US 321A – Lenoir, North Carolina
- Bus. US 321 – Blowing Rock, North Carolina
- Truck US 321 – Boone, North Carolina
- Truck US 321 - Greeneville, Tennessee

=== US 322 ===
- Alt. US 322 – Jamestown to Franklin, Pennsylvania
- Bus. US 322 – northwest of Park Forest Village to Boalsburg, Pennsylvania, via State College
- Alt. Truck US 322 – Downingtown, Pennsylvania
- Truck US 322 – Downingtown, Pennsylvania
- Bus. US 322 – West Chester, Pennsylvania
- Bus. US 322 – Mullica Hill, New Jersey

=== US 331 ===
- Alt. US 331 – Onycha to Opp, Alabama

=== US 340 ===
- Bus. US 340 – west of Alma to Luray, Virginia
- Byp. US 340 – Stanley, Virginia
- Alt. US 340 – White Post to Berryville, Virginia
- Bus. US 340 – Charles Town, West Virginia
- Alt. US 340 – Harpers Ferry, West Virginia

=== US 341 ===
- Bus. US 341 – Eastman, Georgia
- Bus. US 341 – Hawkinsville, Georgia
- Byp. US 341 – Perry, Georgia

=== US 350 ===
- Byp. US 350 – Trinidad, Colorado

=== US 360 ===
- Bus. US 360 - Keysville, Virginia
- Bus. US 360 - Burkeville, Virginia
- Bus. US 360 - Amelia Court House, Virginia
- Bus. US 360 - Mechanicsville, Virginia

=== US 377 ===
- Bus. US 377 – Stephenville, Texas
- Bus. US 377 – Granbury, Texas
- Bus. US 377 – Pilot Point, Texas
- Bus. US 377 – Tioga, Texas
- Bus. US 377 – Collinsville, Texas
- Bus. US 377 – Whitesboro, Texas

=== US 378 ===
- Bus. US 378 – Washington, Georgia
- Bus. US 378 – Sumter, South Carolina
- Bus. US 378 – Lake City, South Carolina
- Byp. US 378 – Lake City, South Carolina
- Truck US 378 – Conway to Hickory Grove, Horry County, South Carolina

=== US 380 ===
- Bus. US 380 – Bridgeport, Texas
- Bus. US 380 – Decatur, Texas
- Truck US 380 – Denton, Texas
- Bus. US 380 – Floyd, Texas

=== US 385 ===
- Truck US 385 – Hill City, South Dakota

=== US 395 ===
- Bus. US 395 – Riverside, California
- Bus. US 395 – Colton to San Bernardino, California
- Bus. US 395 – Ridgecrest, California
- Bus. US 395 – Carson City, Nevada
- Temp. US 395 – Carson City, Nevada
- Alt. US 395 – Washoe Valley to Reno, Nevada
- Bus. US 395 – Reno, Nevada
- Temp. US 395 – Reno, Nevada

== US 400 – US 499 ==
=== US 401 ===
- Bus. US 401 – Bennettsville, South Carolina
- US 401A – Laurinburg, North Carolina
- Bus. US 401 – Laurinburg, North Carolina
- Bus. US 401 – Raeford, North Carolina
- Bus. US 401 – Fayetteville, North Carolina
- Byp. US 401 – Fayetteville, North Carolina
- Bus. US 401 - Rolesville, North Carolina

=== US 411 ===
- Alt. US 411 – Centre, Alabama, to Rome, Georgia
- Bus. US 411 – Centre, Alabama
- Temp. US 411 – Centre, Alabama to Rome, Georgia

=== US 412 ===
- Alt. US 412 - Locust Grove to Kansas, Oklahoma
- Scenic US 412 - Locust Grove to Kansas, Oklahoma
- Spur US 412 - Springdale, Arkansas
- US 412B - Hindsville, Arkansas
- US 412B - Huntsville, Arkansas
- US 412B - Paragould, Arkansas
- Bus. US 412 - Jackson, Tennessee
- Bus. US 412 - Columbia, Tennessee

=== US 421 ===
- Bus. US 421 – Wilmington, North Carolina
- Truck US 421 – Wilmington, North Carolina
- Bus. US 421 – Harrells, North Carolina
- US 421A – Clinton, North Carolina
- Bus. US 421 – Clinton, North Carolina
- Bus. US 421 – Sanford, North Carolina
- Conn. US 421 – Sanford, North Carolina
- Bus. US 421 – Siler City to Staley, North Carolina
- US 421A – North Wilkesboro, North Carolina
- Bus. US 421 – North Wilkesboro to Wilkesboro, North Carolina
- Truck US 421 – Boone, North Carolina
- Bus. US 421 – Gate City, Virginia
- Bus. US 421 – Richmond, Kentucky
- Bus. US 421 – Lexington, Kentucky

=== US 422 ===
- Bus. US 422 - New Castle, Pennsylvania
- Bus. US 422 - West Kittanning to Kittanning, Pennsylvania
- Bus. US 422 - Indiana, Pennsylvania
- Alt. US 422 - Reading, Pennsylvania
- Bus. US 422 - Reading, Pennsylvania
- Alt. US 422 - Norristown to Philadelphia, Pennsylvania
- Byp. US 422 - Barren Hill to Philadelphia, Pennsylvania

=== US 431 ===
- Bus. US 431 – Dothan, Alabama
- Truck US 431 – Seale, Alabama
- Byp. US 431 – Phenix City, Alabama
- Bus. US 431 – Anniston, Alabama
- Byp. US 431 – Gadsden, Alabama
- Bus. US 431 - Lewisburg, Tennessee
- Bus. US 431 – Franklin, Tennessee
- Truck US 431 - Franklin, Tennessee
- Bus. US 431 – Russellville, Kentucky

=== US 441 ===
- Bus. US 441 – Tangerine to Tavares, Florida
- Truck US 441 – Eustis, Florida
- Truck US 441 – Leesburg, Florida
- Alt. US 441 – Lady Lake to Belleview, Florida
- Truck US 441 – Lake City, Florida
- Alt. US 441 – Ocala to Reddick, Florida
- Byp. US 441 – Dublin, Georgia
- Bus. US 441 – Milledgeville, Georgia
- Bus. US 441 – Eatonton, Georgia
- Byp. US 441 – Madison, Georgia
- Bus. US 441 – Watkinsville, Georgia
- Temp. US 441 – Athens, Georgia
- Bus. US 441 – Commerce, Georgia
- Bus. US 441 – Baldwin to Hollywood, Georgia
- Bus. US 441 – Franklin, North Carolina
- Bus. US 441 – Cherokee, North Carolina
- Byp. US 441 – Gatlinburg, Tennessee

=== US 460 ===
- Spur US 460 - St. Louis, Missouri
- Alt. US 460 - Mount Vernon, Illinois
- Byp. US 460 - Louisville, Kentucky
- Byp. US 460 - Georgetown, Kentucky
- Bus. US 460 - Paintsville to Prestonsburg, Kentucky
- Bus. US 460 - Pikeville, Kentucky
- Bus. US 460 - Grundy, Virginia
- Bus. US 460 - Richlands to Cedar Bluff, Virginia
- Bus. US 460 - Tazewell, Virginia
- Temp. US 460 - Bluefield, Virginia to Bluefield, West Virginia
- Bus. US 460 - Pearisburg to Ripplemead, Virginia
- Bus. US 460 - Blacksburg to Christiansburg, Virginia
- Byp. US 460 - Christiansburg, Virginia
- Alt. US 460 - Salem, Virginia
- Bus. US 460 - Bedford, Virginia
- Byp. US 460 - Bedford, Virginia
- Bus. US 460 - Timberlake to Lynchburg, Virginia
- Bus. US 460 - Appomattox, Virginia
- Bus. US 460 - Pamplin City, Virginia
- Bus. US 460 - Farmville, Virginia
- Bus. US 460 - Burkeville, Virginia
- Bus. US 460 - Nottoway to Blackstone, Virginia
- Alt. US 460 - Petersburg, Virginia
- Bus. US 460 - Petersburg, Virginia
- Bus. US 460 - Suffolk, Virginia
- Alt. US 460 - Norfolk to Chesapeake, Virginia

=== US 466 ===
- Alt. US 466 – Las Vegas, Nevada

== US 500 – US 599 ==
=== US 501 ===
- Alt. US 501 - Myrtle Beach, South Carolina
- Bus. US 501 - Conway, South Carolina
- Alt. US 501 - Marion, South Carolina
- Bus. US 501 - Marion, South Carolina
- Bus. US 501 - Laurinburg, North Carolina
- US 501A - Sanford, North Carolina
- Bus. US 501 - Sanford, North Carolina
- Byp. US 501 - Sanford, North Carolina
- US 501A - Chapel Hill, North Carolina
- Bus. US 501 - Chapel Hill, North Carolina
- Bus. US 501 - Durham, North Carolina
- Byp. US 501 - Durham, North Carolina
- Truck US 501 - South Boston, Virginia
- Alt. US 501 - Lynchburg, Virginia
- Bus. US 501 - Lynchburg, Virginia
- Alt. US 501 - Buena Vista, Virginia
- Alt. US 501 - Buena Vista, Virginia
- Bus. US 501 - Buena Vista, Virginia
- Truck US 501 - Buena Vista, Virginia

=== US 521 ===
- Bus. US 521 – Andrews, South Carolina
- Conn. US 521 – Sumter, South Carolina
- Truck US 521 – Camden, South Carolina
- Truck US 521 - Camden, South Carolina
- Alt. US 521 – Kershaw, South Carolina
- Bus. US 521 – Kershaw, South Carolina
- Conn. US 521 - Kershaw, South Carolina
- Truck US 521 – Kershaw, South Carolina
- Conn. US 521 – Kershaw, South Carolina
- Bus. US 521 – Lancaster, South Carolina
- Byp. US 521 – Lancaster, South Carolina

=== US 522 ===
- Bus. US 522 – Washington, Virginia

=== US 541 ===
- Alt. US 541 – Rockport to Tampa, Florida
- Opt. US 541 – Rockport to Ybor City, Florida

=== US 550 ===
- Bus. US 550 – Durango, Colorado

== US 600 – US 699 ==
=== US 601 ===
- Truck US 601 - Orangeburg to Wilkinson Heights, South Carolina
- Truck US 601 - Camden, South Carolina
- Bus. US 601 - Kershaw, South Carolina
- Bus. US 601 - Concord, North Carolina
- Byp. US 601 - Concord, North Carolina
- Bus. US 601 - Dobson, North Carolina

=== US 611 ===
- Alt. US 611 – Philadelphia to Willow Grove, Pennsylvania
- Alt. US 611 – Portland to Stroudsburg, Pennsylvania

=== US 641 ===
- Bus. US 641 – Murray, Kentucky
- Spur US 641 – Benton, Kentucky
- Truck US 641 – Benton, Kentucky

=== US 666 ===
- Bus. US 666 - Douglas, Arizona
- Spur US 666 - Bowie, Arizona
- Temp. US 666 - Clifton to Stargo

== US 700 – US 799 ==
=== US 701 ===
- Bus. US 701 – Mount Pleasant, South Carolina
- Truck US 701 – Conway, South Carolina
- Truck US 701 – Conway to Hickory Grove, South Carolina
- Bus. US 701 – Horry County, South Carolina to Tabor City, North Carolina
- Bus. US 701 – Whiteville, North Carolina
- Bus. US 701 – Clarkton, North Carolina
- US 701A – Clinton, North Carolina
- Bus. US 701 – Clinton, North Carolina

=== US 730 ===
- Spur US 730 – south of Wallula, Washington

== See also ==
- List of business routes of the Interstate Highway System
