= East Columbus =

East Columbus may refer to:

- East Columbus, Ohio
- East Columbus, Georgia
- East Columbus, Indiana
