= Business routes of U.S. Route 12 in Wisconsin =

Business U.S. Highway 12
- US 12 in Wisconsin: mainline in red and business routes in blue

Location
- Country: United States
- State: Wisconsin

Highway system
- United States Numbered Highway System; List; Special; Divided; Wisconsin State Trunk Highway System; Interstate; US; State; Scenic; Rustic

A total of three business routes of U.S. Highway 12 (US 12) currently exist in Wisconsin. Business routes typically run through cities, after a highway was realigned. None are official state highways according to the Wisconsin Department of Transportation (WisDOT) and are thus locally maintained.

== Eau Claire ==
Business U.S. Highway 12
- Location: Eau Claire
- Existed: 1963–1995

Business U.S. Highway 12 (Bus. US 12) was a business loop in Eau Claire. Between the mid-1940s to 1964, Wisconsin Highway 172 (WIS 172) served as the business route of US 12 in Eau Claire. During this time, there were several alterations made on that route. Then, Bus. US 12 was formed to run along WIS 172, forming a brief concurrency. Within a year after the formation, WIS 172 was decommissioned in favor of the new business route. During its existence, nothing significant had happened to the routing. In 1995, the business route was decommissioned.

== Lake Delton–Baraboo ==
Business U.S. Highway 12
- Location: Lake Delton–Baraboo

Business U.S. Highway 12 (Bus. US 12) in Lake Delton follows the old alignment of US 12. It is cosigned as County Trunk Highway BD (CTH-BD); extending until West Baraboo.

In Baraboo, it follows the former alignment of US 12 through the city of Baraboo. It is concurrent with WIS 33 and WIS 113.

== Sauk Prairie ==
Business U.S. Highway 12
- Location: Prairie du Sac–Sauk City

Business U.S. Highway 12 (Bus. US 12) in Sauk City and Prairie du Sac (collectively called "Sauk Prairie") follows the former alignment of US 12. It is concurrent with WIS 78 for much of its length.

== Madison ==
Business U.S. Highway 12
- Location: Madison
- Existed: 1952–early 1970s
- History: Signed as City US 12 before 1963

Business U.S. Highway 12 (Bus. US 12) was a business loop in Madison. After the Madison Beltline was almost finished, Bypass U.S. Highway 12 (Byp. US 12), as well as Bypass Wisconsin Highway 13 (Byp. WIS 13), Bypass U.S. Highway 14 (Byp. US 14), and Bypass U.S. Highway 18 (Byp. US 18), temporarily take over the bypass. After the beltline was completed, all bypass routes on the beltline was replaced by their parent route (US 12, US 14, US 18, and WIS 13). As a result, City U.S. Highway 12 (City US 12), as well as City U.S. Highway 14 (City US 14) and City Wisconsin Highway 13 (City WIS 13), was formed. As of 1963, all city routes, including City US 12, were turned into business routes. Around the early 1970s, all of Madison's business routes (except for the already-decommissioned Bus. WIS 13) were decommissioned.

== Whitewater ==
Business U.S. Highway 12
- Location: Whitewater

Business U.S. Highway 12 (Bus. US 12) in Whitewater follows the former alignment of US 12. From west to east, it follows Main Street, Milwaukee Street, and part of WIS 59 (which runs concurrent with WIS 59 for some of its length).

== See also ==
- Special routes of U.S. Route 12
