= East Columbus, Georgia =

Geographic district in Columbus, Georgia, United States

Coordinates: 32.48°N 84.90°W

East Columbus is a district of Columbus in Muscogee County, Georgia. The area is roughly bounded by Macon Road to the north, Buena Vista Road to the south, Schatulga Road and Fort Benning to the east, and I-185 to the west.

== Schools ==
Notable schools in East Columbus include East Columbus Magnet Academy, as well as the new Mary A. Buckner Academy which opened in 2024.

== Neighborhoods ==
The following are neighborhoods in East Columbus:

- Crystal Valley
- Englewood
- Forest Park
- Forest Park II
- Gentian
- Glen Arden
- Hunter Ridge
- Kingsridge
- Moye Estates
- Oakcrest/Roosevelt Heights
- PineWood
- Schatulga
- Sweetwater
- Woodbriar
- Woodlawn Estates
