= Stargo, Arizona =

- Populated place
- Location within Arizona Location within the United States
- Coordinates: town 33°04′04″N 109°21′36″W
- Country: United States
- State: Arizona
- County: Greenlee
- Elevation: 4,685 ft (1,428 m)
- Time zone: UTC-7 (MST (no DST))
- FIPS code: 04-20750
- GNIS feature ID: 34800

Stargo is the name of a housing development in Greenlee County, Arizona, United States. It was located about two miles northwest of the present location of Morenci. Houses were built starting in the 1930s in what was known as Apache Gulch when miners came to work at the Morenci mines as Phelps Dodge started open pit operations. The name came from the silver mining company which operated in this area, Stargo Silverbelt Mining Company. Families lived here until the early 2000s. Only the upper section of Cedar Loop and Cedar Street are visible today. The area is now buried and a part of the leaching process in mining operations of Freeport-McMoRan Inc.
