= Gentian, Columbus, Georgia =

Coordinates: 32°30′45″N 84°55′45″W

Gentian is a neighborhood Columbus, Georgia. The boundaries are generally acknowledged to be Moon Road and the Columbus Airport to the north, Reese Road to the south, I-185 to the west, and Miller Road to the east. It is also home to Cooper Creek Park.
