= Crystal Valley (Columbus, Georgia) =

32.516°N 84.885°W

Crystal Valley is a residential neighborhood located in Columbus, Georgia. It is located in the eastern section of the city.

It's located 98 meters (320 feet) above the sea level.

== See also ==
- Columbus
