= Woodlawn Estates (Columbus, Georgia) =

Neighborhood in Columbus, Georgia

Coordinates: 32.495°N 84.915°W

Woodlawn Estates is an upscale neighborhood located in Columbus, Georgia. In recent years, the neighborhood has had a real estate boom, with many houses built, most in the $250,000-$400,000 range.
