= Special routes of U.S. Route 12 =

Special routes of U.S. Route 12

Highway system
- United States Numbered Highway System; List; Special; Divided

Several special routes of U.S. Route 12 (US 12) exist, from Washington to Michigan. In order from west to east, separated by state, they are as follows.

== Walla Walla business route ==
U.S. Route 12 Business
- Location: Walla Walla, Washington
- Existed: 1973–c. 2000

A business route in Walla Walla, Washington, was signed in December 1973 along the former alignment of US 12 two months after the main highway was rerouted onto a new freeway bypass of the city.

== Missoula business loop ==
U.S. Highway 12 Business
- Location: Missoula, Montana

U.S. Highway 12 Business (US 12 Bus.) is a business loop that runs through Missoula, Montana. It travels north via Higgins Avenue and then travels east via Broadway Street before ending at Madison Street (US 12).

== Helena business route ==
U.S. Highway 12 Business
- Location: Helena, Montana

== Helena bypass route ==
U.S. Highway 12 Bypass
- Location: Helena, Montana

== Fallon–Ismay temporary route ==
U.S. Highway 12 Temporary
- Location: Fallon–Ismay, Montana

== Big Foot–Crystal Lake temporary route ==
Temporary U.S. Route 12
- Location: Big Foot Prairie–Crystal Lake, Illinois
- Existed: 1928–1929

Temporary U.S. Route 12 (Temp. US 12) was a temporary route of US 12. It was formed in 1928 because a stretch of road between the Wisconsin state line at Richmond and Crystal Lake, Illinois, was incomplete. It ran from Big Foot Prairie to Crystal Lake which roughly followed present-day US 14. It was removed in 1929 after US 12 followed the completed roadway north of Crystal Lake.

== Des Plaines–Chicago business loop ==
U.S. Route 12 Business
- Location: Des Plaines–Chicago, Illinois
- Existed: 1960–1968

City U.S. Route 12
- Location: Des Plaines–Chicago, Illinois
- Existed: 1938–1960

City U.S. Route 12 (City US 12), signed as U.S. Route 12 Business (US 12 Bus.) after 1960, was a business route of US 12, serving the Chicago Loop.

In 1938, almost the entire section of US 12 in Illinois was rerouted. While US 12 moved north along then-Illinois Route 60 from Richmond to Des Plaines, US 12 was rerouted to bypass the Chicago Loop via US 45 and 95th Street. This diversion subsequently redesignated the former route east of Des Plaines to City US 12, albeit along a slightly different path. Before 1938, US 12 traveled along Northwest Highway, Foster Avenue, Lake Shore Drive, Michigan Avenue, and Leif Erikson (now Lake Shore) Drive. City US 12 on the South Side instead traveled along South Parkway (now Martin Luther King Drive), Midway Plaisance, and Stony Island Avenue before ending at US 12/US 20 (95th Street).

In 1941, City US 12 was rerouted to avoid Washington Park, traveling along Oakwood, Drexel, and Hyde Park boulevards. In 1960, City US 12 was renamed to US 12 Bus. In 1963, US 12 Bus. was rerouted onto the tolled Chicago Skyway from Stony Island Avenue to US 12/US 20/US 41 (Indianapolis Boulevard), bearing the designation U.S. Route 12 Toll Business. In 1968, US 12 Bus. was decommissioned altogether.

== Michigan ==
Michigan has had several special routes related to both routings of US 12 in the state. Before 1962, US 12 followed what is now the I-94 corridor, and there was an alternate route in the Kalamazoo area (1931–1954) as well as business routes in Kalamazoo, Battle Creek, Marshall, Albion, and Jackson. After the 1962 realignment of US 12, these business routes were redesignated as business loops of I-94. Two business routes for US 112 in Niles and Ypsilanti were renumbered in 1962 when US 12 replaced US 112.
