= KRMS =

KRMS may refer to:

- KRMS (AM), a radio station (1150 AM) licensed to serve Osage Beach, Missouri, United States
- KRMS-FM, a radio station (93.5 FM) licensed to serve Osage Beach, Missouri
- KRMS-LD, a low-power television station (channel 32) licensed to serve Lake Ozark, Missouri; see List of television stations in Missouri
