= Missouri Route 242 =

State highway in Missouri, U.S.

Route 242
- Horseshoe Bend Parkway
- MO 242 highlighted in red

Route information
- Maintained by MoDOT
- Length: 2.304 mi (3.708 km)
- Existed: 2011–present

Major junctions
- West end: Route MM in Lake Ozark
- East end: US 54 in Lake Ozark

Location
- Country: United States
- State: Missouri

Highway system
- Missouri State Highway System; Interstate; US; State; Supplemental
← Route 240	→ Route 245

Missouri Route 242, also known as Horseshoe Bend Parkway, is a short highway in central Missouri found within Lake Ozark. The highway runs from the US 54 expressway junction near Osage Beach in Miller County in the east to Route MM (near the Lake of the Ozarks Community Bridge, originally a toll bridge) in Camden County.

== History ==
Plans to build Route 242 existed since 2007. Construction for the project did not start at the time due to lack of funding. The project broke ground on January 18, 2011. Route 242 opened on December 13, 2011.

== Route description ==
The west end of Missouri Route 242 begins at the intersection of Horseshoe Bend Pkwy and Route MM, a road which leads to the Lake of the Ozarks Community Bridge and subsequent toll plaza. Continuing east, the road intersects with Fish Haven Road before reaching the intersection of Bagnell Dam Boulevard. The road continues for about a half-mile (800 m) more, where it allows access to both directions of US 54 through an interchange.

== Major intersections ==
The entire route is in Lake Ozark.

County	mi	km	Destinations	Notes
Camden	0.000	0.000	To US 54 Bus. / Horseshoe Bend Parkway west Route MM – Sunrise Beach (via Lake of the Ozarks Community Bridge)	Western terminus of Rte. 242; eastern terminus of Rte. MM; road continues as Horseshoe Bend Pkwy.
Miller	1.884	3.032	To US 54 Bus. (Bagnell Dam Boulevard)	
Miller	1.884– 2.304	3.032– 3.708	US 54 – Jefferson City, Camdenton	Interchange; eastern terminus; road dead ends at junction
1.000 mi = 1.609 km; 1.000 km = 0.621 mi
