= List of U.S. Routes in Missouri =

United States Numbered Highways of the Missouri Highway System
- Highway markers for U.S. Route 61 and U.S. Route 160

System information
- Maintained by MDOT
- Formed: November 11, 1926

Highway names
- US Highways: U.S. Route nn (US nn)

System links
- Missouri State Highway System; Interstate; US; State; Supplemental

== List ==
Number	Length (mi)	Length (km)	Southern or western terminus	Northern or eastern terminus	Formed	Removed	Notes
US 24	215.560	346.910	US 24 at Kansas City	US 24 at West Quincy	1926	current	
US 36	192.660	310.056	US 36 at St. Joseph	I-72/US 36/IL 110 (CKC) at Hannibal	1926	current	
US 40	255.838	411.731	US 40 at Kansas City	I-55/I-64/US 40 at St. Louis	1926	current	
US 50	261.946	421.561	US 50 at Kansas City	I-255/US 50 at St. Louis	1926	current	
US 54	271.494	436.927	US 54 west of Nevada	US 54 at Louisiana	1927	current	
US 55	3.096	4.983	—	—	—	—	Proposed number for what would become US 56.
US 56	3.096	4.983	US 56 at Kansas City	US 71 in Kansas City	1956	current	
US 59	106.256	171.002	US 59 east of Atchison, KS	US 59 north of Rock Port	1934	current	
US 60	320	510	—	—	1926	—	Proposed number for what would become US 66.
US 60	341.232	549.160	US 60 at Seneca	US 60 east of Charleston	1926	current	
US 61	392.847	632.226	US 61 south of Steele	US 61 west of Keokuk, IA	1926	current	
US 62	341.232	549.160	—	—	1926	—	Proposed number for what would become US 60.
US 62	86.705	139.538	US 62 west of Campbell	US 62 east of Charleston	1930	current	
US 63	337.750	543.556	US 63 at Thayer	US 63 north of Lancaster	1926	current	
US 65	313.114	503.908	US 65 south of Branson	US 65 north of Princeton	1926	current	
US 66	320	510	US 66 west of Joplin	US 66 at St. Louis	1926	1985	
US 67	197.582	317.977	US 67 south of Poplar Bluff	US 67 east of West Alton	1926	current	
US 69	121.704	195.864	US 69 at Northmoor	US 69 north of Bethany	1926	current	
US 71	316.722	509.715	US 71 south of Pineville	US 71 north of Maryville	1926	current	
US 73	1.65	2.66	—	—	1926	1983	Decommissioned in Missouri.
US 78	—	—	—	—	—	—	Former proposal highway in Missouri.
US 80	—	—	—	—	—	—	Former proposal highway in Missouri.
US 136	257.457	414.337	US 136 west of Rock Port	US 136 west of Keokuk, IA	1951	current	
US 159	17.648	28.402	US 159 east of Rulo, NE	US 59 north of St. Joseph	1935	current	
US 160	323.417	520.489	US 160 west of Lamar	US 67/Route 158 near Poplar Bluff	1930	current	
US 166	0.936	1.506	US 166 west of Joplin	I-44 west of Joplin	1926	current	Same as U.S. Route 400
US 169	126.908	204.239	US 169 at Kansas City	US 169 north of Grant City	1930	current	
US 271	—	—	—	—	1960	—	Former proposal highway in Missouri; now US 59.
US 275	15.106	24.311	US 136 in Rock Port	US 275 south of Hamburg, IA	1932	current	
US 400	0.936	1.506	US 400 west of Joplin	I-44 west of Joplin	1994	current	Same as U.S. Route 166
US 412	50.767	81.702	US 412 south of Senath	I-155/US 412 east of Caruthersville	1988	current	
US 460	1	1.6	St. Louis	US 460 at St. Louis	1933	1976	
Former

== Special routes ==
Number	Length (mi)	Length (km)	Southern or western terminus	Northern or eastern terminus	Serves	Formed	Removed	Notes
US 24 Opt.	—	—	—	—	Kansas City to Independence	—	—	
US 24 Alt.	1.97	3.17	—	—	Lexington	—	—	
US 24 Bus.	—	—	—	—	Napoleon to Lexington	—	—	
US 24 Bus.	2.48	3.99	—	—	Carrollton	—	—	
US 24 City	—	—	—	—	Kirksville	—	—	
US 24 Bus.	3.50	5.63	—	—	Paris	—	—	
US 36 Bus.	—	—	—	—	St. Joseph	—	—	
US 36 Bus.	1.50	2.41	—	—	Cameron	—	—	
US 36 Bus.	2.82	4.54	—	—	Hamilton	—	—	
US 36 Bus.	—	—	—	—	Mooresville	—	—	
US 36 Bus.	1.05	1.69	—	—	Chillicothe	—	—	
US 36 Bus.	2.65	4.26	—	—	Brookfield	—	—	
US 36 Bus.	3.03	4.88	—	—	Macon	—	—	
US 36 Spur	1	1.6	—	—	Macon	—	—	
US 36 Bus.	1.28	2.06	—	—	Clarence	—	—	
US 36 Bus.	1.77	2.85	—	—	Shelbina	—	—	
US 36 Bus.	2.47	3.98	—	—	Monroe City	—	—	
US 36 Bus.	3.76	6.05	—	—	Hannibal	—	—	
US 36 Alt.	3.65	5.87	US 36 in Hannibal	US 36/Route 79 in Hannibal	Hannibal	—	—	Replaced by US 61 and Route 79
US 36 City	3.76	6.05	—	—	Hannibal	—	—	
US 40 Opt.	—	—	—	—	Kansas City	—	—	
US 40 City	—	—	—	—	Kansas City	—	—	
US 40 Alt.	—	—	—	—	Kansas City to Independence	—	—	
US 40 Opt.	—	—	—	—	Kansas City to Leeds	—	—	
US 40 Opt.	—	—	—	—	Independence to Kansas City	—	—	
US 40 Bus.	—	—	—	—	Columbia	—	—	
US 40 Byp.	—	—	—	—	Wentzville, Missouri to Troy, Illinois	—	—	
US 40 City	—	—	—	—	Pattonville to St. Louis	—	—	
US 40 Truck	—	—	—	—	Frontenac, Missouri to East St. Louis, Illinois	—	—	
US 40 Alt.	—	—	—	—	Bridgeton to St. Louis	—	—	
US 40 Bus.	—	—	—	—	St. Louis	—	—	
US 40 Spur	—	—	—	—	St. Louis	—	—	
US 50 Opt.	—	—	—	—	Olathe, Kansas to Lone Jack, Missouri	—	—	
US 50 Bus.	2.53	4.07	—	—	Warrensburg	—	—	
US 50 Bus.	1.11	1.79	—	—	Knob Noster	—	—	
US 50 Temp.	—	—	—	—	Sedalia	—	1931	Served Sedalia
US 50 Spur	1.21	1.95	—	—	Smithton	—	—	
US 50 Bus.	5.26	8.47	—	—	California	—	—	
US 50 Bus.	4.08	6.57	—	—	St. Martins to Apache Flats	—	—	
US 50 Bus.	—	—	—	—	Jefferson City	—	—	
US 50 Bus.	2.97	4.78	—	—	Jefferson City	—	—	
US 50 Bus.	—	—	—	—	Brentwood to St. Louis	—	—	
City US 50	—	—	—	—	Brentwood to St. Louis	—	—	
US 50 Byp.	—	—	—	—	Mehlville, Missouri to Fairview Heights, Illinois	—	—	
US 50 Truck	—	—	—	—	St. Louis	—	—	
US 54 Bus.	5.15	8.29	—	—	Lake Ozark	—	—	
US 54 Bus.	5.57	8.96	—	—	Eldon	—	—	
US 54 Alt.	—	—	—	—	Jefferson City	—	—	
US 54 Bus.	5.71	9.19	—	—	Fulton	—	—	
US 54 Bus.	6.11	9.83	—	—	Mexico	—	—	
US 54 Bus.	2.967	4.775	—	—	Bowling Green	—	—	
US 54 Bus.	3.375	5.432	—	—	Louisiana	—	—	
US 59 Bus.	—	—	—	—	Industrial City to St. Joseph	—	—	
City US 59	—	—	—	—	Industrial City to St. Joseph	—	—	
US 59 Spur	—	—	—	—	St. Joseph	—	—	Now Missouri Route 759
US 60 Bus.	1.36	2.19	—	—	West Seneca, Oklahoma to Seneca, Missouri	—	—	
US 60 Bus.	7.14	11.49	—	—	Neosho	—	—	
US 60 Bus.	5.91	9.51	—	—	Monett	—	—	
US 60 Bus.	8.01	12.89	—	—	Verona to Aurora	—	—	
US 60 Bus.	—	—	—	—	Springfield	—	—	
US 60 City	—	—	—	—	Springfield	—	—	
US 60 Bus.	3.38	5.44	—	—	Rogersville	—	—	
US 60 Bus.	2.22	3.57	—	—	Mansfield	—	—	
US 60 Bus.	6.51	10.48	—	—	Mountain Grove	—	—	
US 60 Bus.	4.32	6.95	—	—	Cabool	—	—	
US 60 Bus.	5.86	9.43	—	—	Willow Springs	—	—	
US 60 Bus.	2.08	3.35	—	—	Van Buren	—	—	
US 60 Bus.	7.79	12.54	—	—	Poplar Bluff	—	—	
US 60 Bus.	4.28	6.89	—	—	Dexter	—	—	
US 60 Bus.	17.2	27.7	—	—	Sikeston to Charleston	—	—	
US 61 Bus.	—	—	—	—	Holland to Steele	—	—	
US 61 Spur	0.495	0.797	—	—	New Madrid	—	—	
US 61 Bus.	2.57	4.14	—	—	Sikeston	—	—	
US 61 Bus.	—	—	—	—	Cape Girardeau	—	—	
City US 61	—	—	—	—	Cape Girardeau	—	—	
US 61 Alt.	—	—	—	—	St. Louis	—	—	
US 61 Bus.	4.46	7.18	—	—	Bowling Green	—	—	
US 61 Spur	0.460	0.740	—	—	Bowling Green	—	—	
US 61 Bus.	1.92	3.09	—	—	New London	—	—	
US 61 Bus.	6.34	10.20	—	—	Hannibal	—	—	
US 61 City	6.34	10.20	—	—	Hannibal	—	—	
US 61 Bus.	3.43	5.52	—	—	Palmyra	—	—	
US 61 Bus.	4.68	7.53	—	—	La Grange	—	—	
US 61 Bus.	4.94	7.95	—	—	Canton	—	—	
City US 62	—	—	—	—	Sikeston	—	—	
US 63 Bus.	2.13	3.43	—	—	Thayer	—	—	
US 63 Bus.	4.01	6.45	—	—	West Plains	—	—	
US 63 Bus.	4.41	7.10	—	—	Willow Springs	—	—	
US 63 Bus.	4.32	6.95	—	—	Cabool	—	—	
US 63 Bus.	—	—	—	—	Columbia	—	—	
US 63 Conn.	1.251	2.013	—	—	Columbia	—	—	
US 63 Spur	—	—	—	—	Columbia	—	—	
US 63 Bus.	9.58	15.42	—	—	Renick to Moberly	—	—	
US 63 Bus.	7.13	11.47	—	—	Kirksville	—	—	
City US 63	—	—	—	—	Kirksville	—	—	
US 65 Spur	2.03	3.27	—	—	Tina	—	—	
US 65 Bus.	4.51	7.26	—	—	Point Lookout to Branson	—	—	
US 65 Bus.	4.03	6.49	—	—	Ozark	—	—	
US 65 Bus.	9.20	14.81	—	—	Springfield	—	—	
US 65 Byp.	—	—	—	—	Springfield	—	—	
US 65 Spur	1.75	2.82	—	—	Warsaw	—	—	
US 65 Bus.	5.02	8.08	—	—	Marshall	—	—	
US 65 Bus.	2.47	3.98	—	—	Carrollton	—	—	
US 65 Bus.	2.93	4.72	—	—	Trenton	—	—	
City US 65	—	—	—	—	Trenton	—	—	
US 66 Alt.	—	—	—	—	Joplin	—	—	
US 66 Bus.	—	—	—	—	Joplin	—	—	
US 66 Byp.	—	—	—	—	Joplin	—	—	
US 66 Alt.	—	—	—	—	Joplin to Webb City	—	—	
US 66 Bus.	—	—	—	—	Webb City to Carterville	—	—	
US 66 Alt.	—	—	—	—	Carthage to Kendricktown	—	—	
US 66 Bus.	—	—	—	—	Carthage	—	—	
US 66 Bus. Alt.	—	—	—	—	Springfield	—	—	
US 66 Bus.	—	—	—	—	Springfield	—	—	
US 66 Byp.	—	—	—	—	Springfield	—	—	
City US 66	—	—	—	—	Springfield	—	—	
US 66 Bus.	—	—	—	—	Lebanon	—	—	
US 66 Bus.	—	—	—	—	Waynesville	—	—	
US 66 Spur	—	—	—	—	Fort Leonard Wood	—	—	
US 66 Bus.	—	—	—	—	Rolla	—	—	
City US 66	—	—	—	—	Rolla	—	—	
US 66 Bus.	—	—	—	—	Pacific	—	—	
US 66 Bus.	—	—	—	—	St. Louis to Sunset Hills	—	—	
US 66 Byp.	—	—	—	—	St. Louis to Sunset Hills	—	—	
US 66 Opt.	—	—	—	—	St. Louis, Missouri to Venice, Illinois	—	—	
City US 66	—	—	—	—	St. Louis, Missouri to Mitchell, Illinois	—	—	
City US 66	—	—	—	—	Kirkwood to Bellefontaine Neighbors	—	—	
US 67 Bus.	7.34	11.81	—	—	Poplar Bluff	—	—	
US 67 Bus.	2.33	3.75	—	—	Greenville	—	—	
US 67 Bus.	7.97	12.83	—	—	Fredericktown to Cherokee Pass	—	—	
US 67 Bus.	5.27	8.48	—	—	Leadington to Park Hills	—	—	
US 67 Alt.	—	—	—	—	Mehlville, Missouri to Alton, Illinois	—	—	
US 67 Byp.	—	—	—	—	Mehlville, Missouri to Alton, Illinois	—	—	
US 69 Alt.	—	—	—	—	Kansas City, Missouri to Olathe, Kansas	—	—	
US 69 Bus.	—	—	—	—	Excelsior Springs	—	—	
US 69 Spur	0.84	1.35	—	—	Bethany	—	—	
Temp. US 71	—	—	—	—	Bentonville, Arkansas to Lanagan, Missouri	—	—	
US 71 Byp.	18.9	30.4	—	—	Douglas County, Missouri to Bella Vista, Arkansas	—	—	
US 71 Bus.	12.7	20.4	—	—	Pineville to Anderson	—	—	Known as an alternate alignment to US 71 in 2019
US 71 Bus.	—	—	—	—	Neosho	—	—	
US 71 Alt.	—	—	—	—	Neosho to Carthage	—	—	
US 71 Opt.	—	—	—	—	Neosho to Carthage	—	—	
US 71B	—	—	—	—	Saginaw to Webb City via Joplin	—	—	
US 71 Spur	1.15	1.85	—	—	Milo	—	—	
US 71 Bus.	—	—	—	—	Nevada	—	—	
US 71 Bus.	—	—	—	—	Butler to Passaic	—	—	
US 71 Bus.	—	—	—	—	Kansas City	—	—	
City US 71	—	—	—	—	Kansas City	—	—	
US 71 Byp.	—	—	—	—	Harrisonville to Ferrelview via Kansas City	—	—	
US 71 Byp.	—	—	—	—	Tracy	—	—	
US 71 Byp.	—	—	—	—	Platte City	—	—	
City US 71	—	—	—	—	Faucett to St. Joseph	—	—	
US 71 Bus.	8.94	14.39	—	—	St. Joseph to Savannah	—	—	
US 71 Spur	—	—	—	—	St. Joseph	—	—	
US 71 Bus.	5.12	8.24	—	—	Maryville	—	—	
US 136 Bus.	1.73	2.78	—	—	Albany	—	—	
US 136 Bus.	0.97	1.56	—	—	Memphis	—	—	
US 136 Spur	0.71	1.14	—	—	Arbela	—	—	
US 136 Bus.	3.59	5.78	—	—	Kahoka	—	—	
US 136 Spur	1.10	1.77	—	—	Wayland	—	—	
US 160 Bus.	1.90	3.06	—	—	Willard	—	—	
City US 160	—	—	—	—	Springfield	—	—	
US 166 Bus.	—	—	—	—	Joplin	—	—	
US 166 Bus.	—	—	—	—	Springfield	—	—	
City US 166	—	—	—	—	Springfield	—	—	
US 166 Truck	—	—	—	—	Springfield	—	—	
US 169 Alt.	—	—	—	—	Kansas City, Kansas to Northmoor	—	—	
US 169 Spur	0.48	0.77	—	—	Smithville	—	—	
US 412 Alt.	1.87	3.01	—	—	Kennett	—	—	A temporary alternate route assigned to parts of Highways W and VV.
US 460 Spur	45.33	72.95	—	—	St. Louis	—	—	
Former
