= KRMS-LD =

Television station in Lake Ozark, Missouri

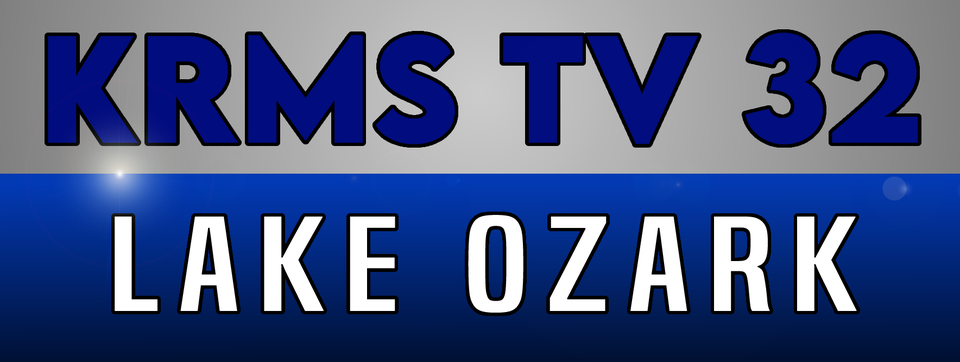
- Lake Ozark–Jefferson City, Missouri; United States
- City: Lake Ozark, Missouri
- Channels: Digital: 32 (UHF); Virtual: 32
- Branding: KRMS TV 32 Lake Ozark

Programming
- Affiliations: 32.1: Cozi TV; for others, see § Subchannels

Ownership
- Owner: Viper Communications, Inc.
- Sister stations: KRMS, KRMS-FM

History
- First air date: February 14, 2019
- Former call signs: K27OS-D (2021); K32OW-D (2021)
- Call sign meaning: Robert M. Smith (shared callsigns with KRMS-AM and FM)

Technical information
- Licensing authority: FCC
- Facility ID: 182677
- Class: LD
- ERP: 15 kW
- HAAT: 134.6 m (442 ft)
- Transmitter coordinates: 38°9′52.1″N 92°36′12.6″W

Links
- Public license information: LMS
- Website: www.krmstv32.com

KRMS-LD (channel 32) is a low-power television station licensed to Lake Ozark, Missouri, United States, serving the Lake of the Ozarks region (located in both the Springfield and Columbia–Jefferson City markets) as an affiliate of Cozi TV. It is owned by Viper Communications alongside radio stations KRMS (1150 AM) and KRMS-FM (93.5). The stations share studios on Old US 54 in Osage Beach; KRMS-LD's transmitter is located on Osage Ridge Road, also in Osage Beach.

== History ==
On August 26, 2021, Viper Communications (managed by principal owners Ken Kuenzie and Dennis Klautzer) announced in a press release that they had acquired a construction permit from the FCC to operate a television station in the Lake of the Ozarks area on channel 32. The company already owned KRMS and KRMS-FM in the Lake of the Ozarks area; and KHKU in Hanapepe, Hawaii. They shared their excitement to bring the area their first-ever television station and hoped to have it on the air by the end of 2021.

The programming on the station would be run by KRMS radio and offer local news and content, as well as four channels of networks not currently in the area with more to be added at a later date. Viper Communications announced they would start hiring more staff to assist in producing local content. The television station would eventually start using ATSC 3.0 technology to transmit a 4K picture. The owners stated, "Since we began, we have always believed in growth and the people of this area. That's why we invested in bringing the latest technology here."

== Programming ==
Programming includes local news and events produced by KRMS as well as syndicated programming such as Little House on the Prairie, Xploration Awesome Planet, and Bonanza.

KRMS also produces short newscasts that air on multiple subchannels. Titled Lake News Now, these newscasts are anchored by local broadcaster Matt Markivee and show news highlights from the Lake of the Ozarks area.

== Technical information ==
The station has a 35-mile (56 km) broadcast radius according to a Facebook post released by KRMS Radio. The station uses the same transmitter site as KRMS (AM) and KRMS-FM.

=== Subchannels ===
The station's signal is multiplexed:

Subchannels of KRMS-LD
Channel	Res.	Short name	Programming
32.1	480i	COZITV	Cozi TV
32.2	480i	RAVNEWS	Real America's Voice
32.3	480i	OAN	One America Plus
32.4	480i	GETTV	Great
32.5	480i	BUZZR	Buzzr
32.6	480i	YTA	YTA TV
32.7	480i	NOST	NOST
32.8	480i	DAYSTAR	Daystar
32.9	480i	WEATHER	WeatherNation TV
32.10	480i	TCN	The Country Network
32.11	720p	KRMS	KRMS News/Simulcast of KRMS Radio
