= Special routes of U.S. Route 59 =

Special routes of U.S. Route 59

Highway system
- United States Numbered Highway System; List; Special; Divided

Several special routes of U.S. Route 59 exist. In order from south to north they are as follows.

== Texas ==
=== Laredo business loop ===
Business U.S. Highway 59-Z
- Location: Laredo
- Length: 3.533 mi (5.686 km)
- Existed: 2014–present

Business U.S. Highway 59-Z (Bus. US 59-Z) is a 3.533-mile-long (5.686 km) business loop in Laredo. The business loop was formed on February 27, 2014, from the older alignment of US 59 from Loop 20 to I-35, after US 59 proper was rerouted onto Loop 20 westbound to the World Trade International Bridge at the international border. On June 26, 2014, the section of US 59 and Loop 20 between I-35 and the border was designated as a segment of I-69W. Bus. US 59-Z is known as Saunders Street along its entire length, beginning at I-35 exit 2 and ending at the US 59/Loop 20 interchange, at the eastern end of Laredo.

=== George West business loop ===
Business U.S. Highway 59-X
- Location: George West
- Length: 1.334 mi (2.147 km)
- Existed: 1990–present

Business U.S. Highway 59-X (Bus. US 59-X), formerly Spur 589, is a 6.639-mile-long (10.684 km) business loop in George West. The loop was originally formed when US 59 was rerouted south of downtown George West on March 28, 1989. The section between US 59 east of town and US 281 became Spur 589, while the remainder was signed and designated as US 281 only. Spur 589 was redesignated as Bus. US 59-X on June 21, 1990.

The loop starts at US 281 in town, at the intersection of Nueces Street and Houston Street. The loop continues six blocks east, crossing the railroad tracks, then curves southeast, ending at the US 59 expressway, outside of George West.

=== Victoria business loop ===
Business U.S. Highway 59-T
- Location: Victoria
- Length: 13.763 mi (22.149 km)
- Existed: 1995–present

Business U.S. Highway 59-T (Bus. US 59-T) is a 13.763-mile-long (22.149 km) business loop in Victoria. The route was formed on January 26, 1995, along a former section of US 59 through Victoria after US 59 proper was rerouted onto the southeastern segment of Loop 463. The loop starts at an interchange with US 59 and US 77 at the Zac Lentz Parkway southwest of Victoria, continuing on the route taken by US 59 between George West and Victoria. Approximately 2.8 miles (4.5 kilometres) east of the parkway, Bus. US 59-T meets Bus. US 77-S at a grade-separated interchange. Both Bus. US 59-T and Bus. US 77-S continue concurrently past both the southern termini of FM 236 and FM 1685 respectively, crossing a divided four-lane bridge over the Guadalupe River, then enter Victoria through the southwest side of town.

Both loops take a northeast direction onto Moody Street, then curve sharply right to the east on Rio Grande Street. At Main Street, both loops share a temporary wrong-way concurrency with US 87 for four city blocks to Navarro Street. US 87 diverges and continues south on Navarro Street, while Bus. US 77-S diverges north on the same cross street. Bus. US 59-T continues alone east through Victoria, along Houston Highway. After passing an interchange with Loop 463 at the Zac Lentz Parkway, the loop ends at the US 59 freeway on the eastern end of town.

=== El Campo business loop ===
Business U.S. Highway 59-S
- Location: El Campo
- Length: 6.590 mi (10.606 km)
- Existed: 1997–present

Business U.S. Highway 59-S (Bus. US 59-S) is a 6.590-mile-long (10.606 km) business loop in El Campo. The loop was formed on April 23, 1997, after US 59 was rerouted on the southeast side of town on a new expressway.

=== Wharton–Hungerford business loop ===
Business U.S. Highway 59-R
- Location: Wharton–Hungerford
- Length: 4.010 mi (6.453 km)
- Existed: 1998–present

Business U.S. Highway 59-R (Bus. US 59-R) is a 4.010-mile-long (6.453 km) business loop between Wharton and Hungerford. The loop was designated on October 29, 1998, after US 59 was re-routed on an expressway along the northwest side of town.

=== Southside Place–Houston alternate route ===
Alternate U.S. Highway 59
- Location: Southside Place–Houston
- Existed: 1945–1950

=== Houston business loop ===
Business U.S. Highway 59
- Location: Houston
- Existed: 1941–1956

It was formerly Business US 59-N (Bus. US 59-N) or Business US 59-M (Bus. US 59-M).

=== Splendora business loop ===
Business U.S. Highway 59-L
- Location: Splendora
- Length: 1.494 mi (2.404 km)
- Existed: 1972–present

Business U.S. Highway 59-L (Bus. US 59-L), formerly Loop 512, is a 1.494-mile-long (2.404 km) business loop in Splendora. The loop was first designated on November 3, 1972, when US 59 was moved onto a bypass on the northwest side of town. Although the new route was signed as Bus. US 59, it was given the hidden designation of Loop 512. On June 21, 1990, Loop 512 was decommissioned and properly redesignated as Bus. US 59-L.

=== Livingston business loop ===
Business U.S. Highway 59-K
- Location: Livingston
- Length: 4.586 mi (7.380 km)
- Existed: 1990–present

Business U.S. Highway 59-K (Bus. US 59-K), formerly Loop 90, is a 4.586-mile-long (7.380 km) business loop in Livingston. The loop was first designated as Loop 90 on June 23, 1981, when US 59 was re-routed on the western side of town along a new bypass. On June 21, 1990, Loop 90 was redesignated as Bus. US 59-J. On July 12, 2022, the route was redesignated to Business U.S. Highway 59-K; the 59-J designation was moved to the business route in Corrigan.

=== Corrigan business loop ===
Business U.S. Highway 59-J
- Location: Corrigan
- Length: 4.900 mi (7.886 km)

Business U.S. Highway 59-J (Bus. US 59-J), formerly the route of U.S. Route 59 will be a 4.9-mile-long (7.886 km) business loop in Corrigan. The bypass is not yet open to traffic as it is still under construction.

=== Burke–Diboll business loop ===
Business U.S. Highway 59-H
- Location: Burke–Diboll
- Length: 6.700 mi (10.783 km)
- Existed: 2023–present

Business U.S. Highway 59-H (Bus. US 59-H) is a 6.7-mile (10.8 km) business loop that runs through Burke and Diboll. It was commissioned on May 25, 2023, from a former alignment of US 59, after that route was redesignated along a freeway bypass to the east of the cities. The bypass is now open to traffic as it is now completed.

=== Lufkin business loop ===
Business U.S. Highway 59-G
- Location: Lufkin
- Length: 4.553 mi (7.327 km)
- Existed: 1990–present

Business U.S. Highway 59-G (Bus. US 59-G) is a 4.553-mile-long (7.327 km) business loop in Lufkin. The loop was commissioned on June 21, 1990, from an old section of US 59, after US 59 bypassed Lufkin, being rerouted onto the eastern section of Loop 227.

=== Nacogdoches business loop ===
Business U.S. Highway 59-F
- Location: Nacogdoches County
- Length: 6.639 mi (10.684 km)
- Existed: 1970–present

Business U.S. Highway 59-F (Bus. US 59-F), formerly Loop 495, is a 6.639-mile (10.684 km) business loop in Nacogdoches County that passes through Nacogdoches. The loop was first commissioned on October 2, 1970, along the new Loop 224 bypass around the western side of Nacogdoches. Although signed as Bus. US 59, the route had the hidden designation of Loop 495. On June 21, 1990, Loop 495 was decommissioned and the loop was fully designated as Bus. US 59-F.

=== Carthage business loop ===
Business U.S. Highway 59-D
- Location: Carthage
- Length: 3.585 mi (5.769 km)
- Existed: 1959–present

Business U.S. Highway 59-D (Bus. US 59-D), formerly Loop 455, is a 3.585-mile-long (5.769 km) business loop in Carthage. This is the oldest signed business route of US 59 in Texas, having been originally designated on October 21, 1959, with the hidden designation of Loop 455, after US 59 was re-routed and bypassed Carthage. Loop 455 was retired on June 21, 1990, and redesignated fully as Bus. US 59-D.

=== Marshall business loop ===
Business U.S. Highway 59-C
- Location: Marshall
- Length: 13.900 mi (22.370 km)
- Existed: 2021–present

Business U.S. Highway 59-C (Bus. US 59-C), formerly the route of U.S. Route 59, is a 13.9-mile-long (22.370 km) business loop in Marshall. It was commissioned on April 29, 2021, and it runs from US 59 (Future I-369) and Henderson School Road southward to approximately 1.0 mile south of FM 2625, and Interstate 20 is exit 618, it goes through SH 43, US 80, and Loop 390, and then it finally goes to US 59 (Future I-369). The bypass is not yet open to traffic as it is still in the planning stages.

=== Jefferson business loop ===
Business U.S. Highway 59-B
- Location: Jefferson
- Length: 2.88 mi (4.63 km)

Business US 59-B (Bus. US 59-B) is a business route located in Jefferson, Texas.

=== Atlanta business loop ===
Business U.S. Highway 59-A II
- Location: Atlanta
- Length: 2.54 mi (4.09 km)

Business US 59-A II (Bus. US 59-A II) is a business route located in Atlanta, Texas.

=== Texarkana bypass route ===
Bypass U.S. Highway 59
- Location: Texarkana
- Existed: 1942–1956

== Texas-Arkansas ==
=== Texarkana business loop ===
Business U.S. Highway 59-A
- Location: Texarkana, Texas – Texarkana, Arkansas
- Length: 7.45 mi (11.99 km)

Business U.S. Highway 59-A (Bus. US 59-A) was formerly in Texarkana, Texas, and Texarkana, Arkansas.

== Texas-Oklahoma ==
=== Maud – Page temporary route ===
Temporary U.S. Highway 59
- Location: Maud, Texas - Page, Oklahoma
- Existed: 1942–1956

== Oklahoma ==
=== Poteau bypass route ===
Bypass U.S. Highway 59
- Location: west of Poteau
- Length: 4.29 mi (6.90 km)

U.S. Route 59 Bypass, also known as the Cavanal Expressway, is a special route of U.S. Route 59 running along the west outskirts of Poteau. It is 4.29 miles (6.90 km) long.

On the official state highway maps, US-59 is shown routed along the bypass. It is signed alternately as US-59 Bypass and US-59/US-271.

== Arkansas-Oklahoma ==
=== Fort Smith–West Siloam Springs temporary route ===
Temporary U.S. Highway 59
- Location: Fort Smith, Arkansas – West Siloam Springs, Oklahoma

Temporary U.S. Highway 59 (Temp. US 59) was a temporary route in Fort Smith, Arkansas, and West Siloam Springs, Oklahoma.

Alternate U.S. Highway 59 (Alt. US 59) was an alternate route in Fort Smith, Arkansas, and West Siloam Springs, Oklahoma.

Alternate U.S. Highway 59
- Location: Fort Smith, Arkansas – West Siloam Springs, Oklahoma

== Kansas ==
=== Ottawa business loop ===
Business U.S. Highway 59
- Location: Ottawa

Business U.S. Highway 59 (Bus. US 59) is a business route in Ottawa, Kansas.

== Missouri ==
=== Industrial City–St. Joseph business loop ===
Business U.S. Highway 59
- Location: Industrial City–St. Joseph

City U.S. Highway 59 (City US 59) was a city route in Industrial City and St. Joseph, Missouri.

=== Industrial City–St. Joseph city route ===
City U.S. Route 59
- Location: Industrial City–St. Joseph

Business U.S. Highway 59 (Bus. US 59) was a business route in Industrial City and St. Joseph, Missouri.

== See also ==
- List of special routes of the United States Numbered Highway System
