= KQUL =

- Lake Ozark, Missouri; United States
- Broadcast area: Osage Beach, Missouri; Camdenton, Missouri
- Frequency: 102.7 MHz
- Branding: Classic Hits - Cool 102.7

Programming
- Format: Classic hits

Ownership
- Owner: Harbit Communications, Inc.

History
- First air date: 1994
- Former call signs: KABE (1993–1994, CP)
- Call sign meaning: "QUL" (Cool) 102.7

Technical information
- Licensing authority: FCC
- Facility ID: 55671
- Class: A
- ERP: 6,000 watts
- HAAT: 100 meters (330 ft)
- Transmitter coordinates: 38°02′06″N 92°34′33″W

Links
- Public license information: Public file; LMS
- Webcast: Listen live
- Website: cool1027.com

KQUL is a radio station airing a classic hits format licensed to Lake Ozark, Missouri, broadcasting on 102.7 FM. The station is owned by Harbit Communications, Inc.
