= Special routes of U.S. Route 54 =

U.S. highway system

Special routes of U.S. Route 54

Highway system
- United States Numbered Highway System; List; Special; Divided

Several special routes of U.S. Route 54 exist, from Texas to Missouri. In order from southwest to northeast, they are as follows.

== Texas ==
=== El Paso business loop ===
Business U.S. Highway 54
- Location: El Paso, Texas
- Length: 12.5 mi (20.1 km)
- Existed: 1990–present

== New Mexico ==
=== Tucumcari business loop ===
Business Loop US 54
- Location: Tucumcari, New Mexico
- Length: 2.410 mi (3.879 km)

=== Alamogordo business loop ===
U.S. Highway 54 Business
- Location: Alamogordo, New Mexico
- Length: 6 mi (9.7 km)
- Existed: 2002–present

Northbound is signed as "Business Route", but not shielded.

== Kansas ==
=== El Dorado Truck Route ===
U.S. Highway 54 Truck
- Location: El Dorado, Kansas
- Length: 0.327 mi (526 m)

U.S. Route 54 Truck (US 54 Truck.) is a truck route of US 54. The route starts at a junction with U.S. 54 heading west 1 block before heading north to rejoin with U.S. 54. The entire route is concurrent with U.S. 77 Truck. The route is commonly used as a bypass for downtown.

== Missouri ==
=== Lake Ozark business loop ===
U.S. Route 54 Business
- Location: Lake Ozark, Missouri
- Length: 5.474 mi (8.810 km)
- Existed: 1969–2021

Route 354
- Location: Lake Ozark, Missouri
- Length: 5.474 mi (8.810 km)
- Existed: 1968–1969

U.S. Route 54 Business (US 54 Bus.) was a business route of US 54. It traveled due west along Missouri Route 242, briefly south along Osage Beach Parkway, and west along Bagnell Dam Boulevard to get to downtown Lake Ozark. It then continued northward along the same street to reconnect to US 54.

Originally, US 54 used to directly serve Lake Ozark. Then, in 1968, US 54 was rerouted onto a newly-opened bypass; Missouri Route 354 briefly took the place of US 54's old alignment. In 1969, Route 354 was replaced with US 54 Bus. The business route designation was eventually removed in 2021.

Major intersections

The entire route is in Lake Ozark.

| County | mi | km | Destinations | Notes |
|---|---|---|---|---|
| Miller | 0.000 | 0.000 | US 54 – Camdenton, Jefferson City Route 242 begins | Interchange; western end of Route 242 overlap |
| Miller | 0.324 | 0.521 | Route 242 west – Lake Ozark | Eastern end of Route 242 overlap |
| Miller | 0.917 | 1.476 | Old Highway 54 | Former US 54 |
| Camden | 2.962 | 4.767 | Horseshoe Bend Parkway to US 54 / Route MM To Route 5 – Sunrise Beach (via toll bridge) | |
| Miller | 4.187– 4.635 | 6.738– 7.459 | Bagnell Dam over Lake of the Ozarks | |
| Miller | 5.190 | 8.352 | Route W | Roundabout |
| Miller | 5.394 | 8.681 | US 54 – Osage Beach, Eldon | Roundabout interchange |
1.000 mi = 1.609 km; 1.000 km = 0.621 mi: Concurrency terminus

=== Eldon business loop ===
U.S. Route 54 Business
- Location: Eldon, Missouri
- Length: 5.838 mi (9.395 km)
- Existed: 1975–present

U.S. Route 54 Business (US 54 Bus.) is a business route of US 54. It travels north along Route 52 to directly serve Eldon. It then travels due northeast to reconnect to US 54.

Originally, US 54 directly served Eldon. In 1975, US 54 bypassed Eldon, which resulted in the creation of US 54 Bus.

Major intersections

The entire route is in Eldon, Miller County.

| mi | km | Destinations | Notes |
|---|---|---|---|
| 0.000 | 0.000 | US 54 east / Route 52 – Lake of the Ozarks, Jefferson City | Interchange; western end of Route 52 overlap |
| 3.067 | 4.936 | Route 52 west (4th Street) | Eastern end of Route 52 overlap |
| 3.599 | 5.792 | Route 87 south (E. North Street) | Southern end of Route 87 overlap |
| 4.207 | 6.771 | Route 87 north (Manor Drive) | Northern end of Route 87 overlap |
| 5.838 | 9.395 | US 54 – Jefferson City | Northbound exit and southbound entrance only |
1.000 mi = 1.609 km; 1.000 km = 0.621 mi: Concurrency terminus

=== Jefferson City alternate route ===
U.S. Route 54 Alternate
- Location: Jefferson City, Missouri
- Length: 1 mi (1.6 km)
- Existed: 1957–1964

=== Fulton business loop ===
U.S. Route 54 Business
- Location: Fulton, Missouri
- Length: 5.870 mi (9.447 km)
- Existed: 1972–present

U.S. Route 54 Business (US 54 Bus.) is a business route of US 54. It travels due northeast to connect to downtown Fulton. It then travels due north via Market Street, St. Louis Avenue, and Bluff Street before reconnecting to US 54.

Prior to 1972, US 54 used to run straight to Fulton. Since 1972, US 54 bypassed Fulton. This resulted in the creation of US 54 Business.

=== Mexico business loop ===
U.S. Route 54 Business
- Location: Audrain County, Missouri
- Length: 6.223 mi (10.015 km)
- Existed: 1990–present

In the 1990s, US 54 was rerouted to bypass Mexico.

Major intersections

The entire route is in Audrain County.

| Location | mi | km | Destinations | Notes |
|---|---|---|---|---|
| Mexico | 0.000 | 0.000 | US 54 – Bowling Green, Jefferson City Route 15 begins / Route 22 begins | Interchange; southern end of Route 15 and Route 22 overlap |
| Mexico | 3.324 | 5.349 | Route 15 north / Route 22 west (Boulevard Street) / S. Clark Street – Mexico | Northern end of Route 15 and 22 overlap |
| Vandiver | 6.223 | 10.015 | US 54 west – Jefferson City | Road continues as US 54 |
1.000 mi = 1.609 km; 1.000 km = 0.621 mi: Concurrency terminus

=== Bowling Green business loop ===
U.S. Route 54 Business
- Location: Pike County, Missouri
- Length: 2.967 mi (4.775 km)
- Existed: 1985–present

A 2.967-mile (4.775 km) business loop exists in Pike County, Missouri. It intersects with Business 61 in Bowling Green. It is also known as Old U.S. Route 54.

=== Louisiana business loop ===
U.S. Route 54 Business
- Location: Louisiana, Missouri
- Length: 3.375 mi (5.432 km)
- Existed: 2003–present

A 3-mile (4.8 km) business loop exists in Louisiana, Missouri.

== Illinois ==
=== Kankakee business loop ===
U.S. Route 54 Business
- Location: Kankakee, Illinois
- Length: 6 mi (9.7 km)
- Existed: 1959–1969

U.S. Route 54 Business (formerly U.S. Route 54 City) was a business route of US 54. Before 1959, US 54 ran through downtown Kankakee. In 1959, US 54 was rerouted onto a bypass (now part of Interstate 57) which, as a result, created US 54 City. It followed north through Kankakee via US 45/52 and present-day IL 50. It was then changed into US 54 Business in 1960. Originally, the freeway abruptly stopped at North Street which caused US 54 to travel west to its city route. It remained like that until 1962 when a freeway connection between US 54 Business and North Avenue was made. In 1969, US 54 supplanted its business route as the bypass was extended on both ends. Three years later, in 1972, US 54 was significantly truncated, removing a section of US 54 between Griggsville and Chicago.

== See also ==
- List of special routes of the United States Numbered Highway System
