= Special routes of U.S. Route 36 in Missouri =

Special routes of U.S. Route 36

Highway system
- United States Numbered Highway System; List; Special; Divided; Missouri State Highway System; Interstate; US; State; Supplemental

There have been eleven special routes of U.S. Route 36 in the state of Missouri. All but one of which are or were business routes while the other was a spur route. Eight of the ten business routes exist today. The spur route became one of the extant business routes in 1973.

== Cameron business route ==
U.S. Route 36 Business
- Location: Cameron
- Length: 1.504 mi (2.420 km)
- Existed: 1964–present

Business US 36 in Cameron begins in the northwest of Cameron, starting at the intersection between US 36 and Ensign Trace, then quickly turns east-southeast as West Grand Avenue. It travels approximately a mile until its intersection with US 69, which is also Bus. I-35, where it turns north and travels concurrently for almost a half-mile until it meets US-36 in the north-center of Cameron as a diamond interchange.

== Hamilton business route ==
U.S. Route 36 Business
- Location: Hamilton
- Length: 2.807 mi (4.517 km)
- Existed: 1962–present

Business US 36 in Hamilton begins west of Hamilton, starting at the intersection between US 36 and Northwest Old 36 Highway. It continues east and immediately passes south of Hamilton Reservoir, and travels about a mile until Hamilton city limits. From there it travels another mile east to the center of town, where it junctions with Route 13. Then the route turns south and heads concurrent with Route 13 about a half-mile towards US 36 at the south end of Hamilton and meets it at a diamond interchange.

== Chillicothe business route ==
U.S. Route 36 Business
- Location: Chillicothe
- Length: 1.042 mi (1.677 km)

Business US 36 in Chillicothe begins at the south end of Chillicothe, starting at the diamond interchange between US 36 and US 65. The route travels about an eighth-mile north before turning east and traveling through the south of town parallel to US 36. The route continues three-fourths of a mile passing by various businesses, and turns south at South Mitchell Avenue before rejoining US 36 in the southeast of town.

== Brookfield business route ==
U.S. Route 36 Business
- Location: Brookfield
- Length: 2.769 mi (4.456 km)
- Existed: 1955–present

== Macon business route ==
U.S. Route 36 Business
- Location: Macon
- Length: 2.827 mi (4.550 km)
- Existed: 1973–present

== Macon spur ==
U.S. Route 36 Spur
- Location: Macon
- Length: 1.0 mi (1.6 km)
- Existed: 1956–1973

== Clarence business route ==
U.S. Route 36 Business
- Location: Clarence
- Length: 1.498 mi (2.411 km)

== Shelbina business route ==
U.S. Route 36 Business
- Location: Shelbina
- Length: 1.772 mi (2.852 km)
- Existed: 1968–present

== Monroe City business route ==
U.S. Route 36 Business
- Location: Monroe City
- Length: 2.461 mi (3.961 km)
- Existed: 1976–present

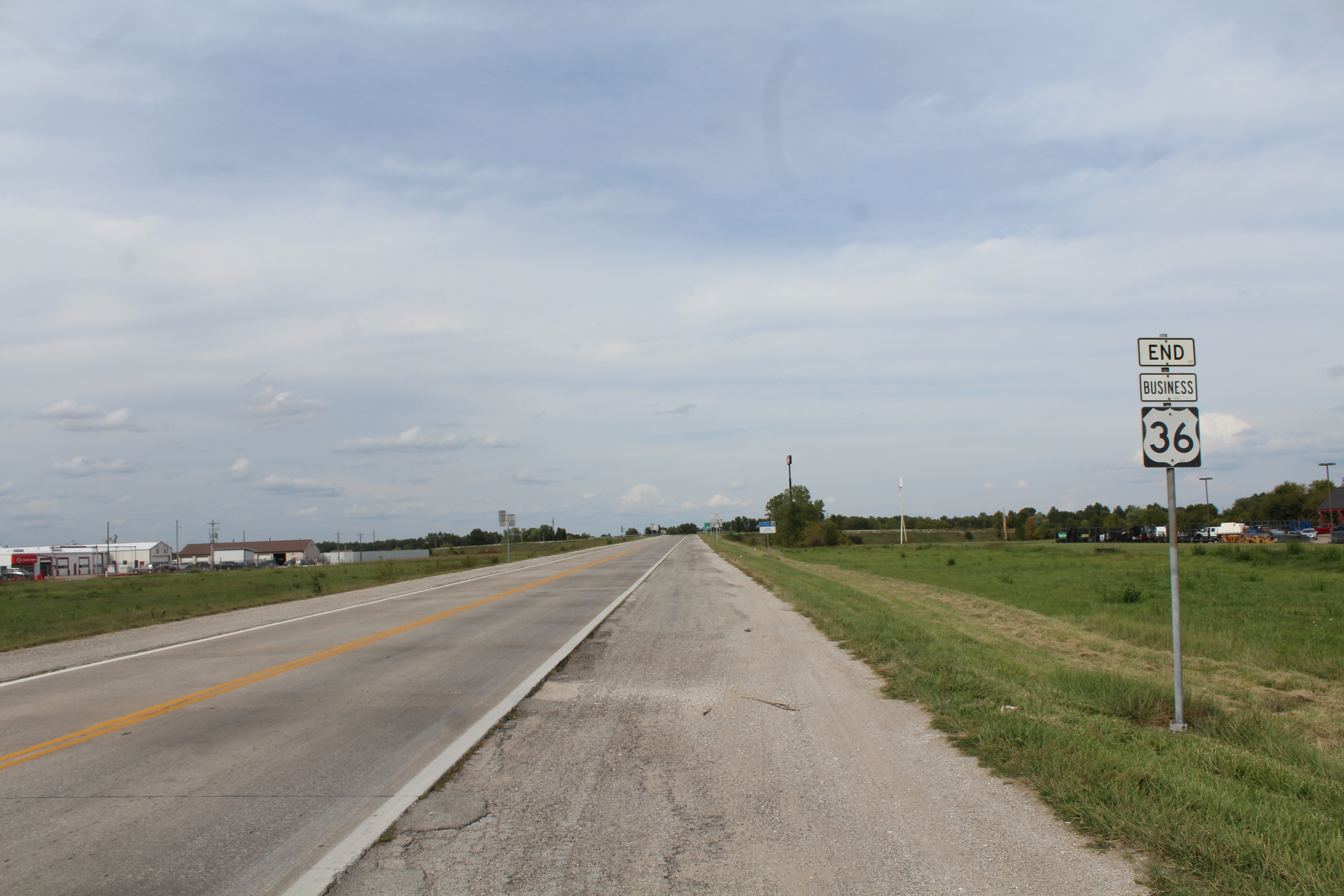
Eastern end of Business 36 in Monroe City

== Hannibal city route ==
U.S. Route 36 City
- Location: Hannibal
- Existed: yes

== Hannibal business route ==
U.S. Route 36 Business
- Location: Hannibal
- Length: 3.6 mi (5.8 km)
- Existed: 1960–2013

U.S. Route 36 Business (Bus. US 36) in the city of Hannibal, Missouri, was a business route that is a loop of US 36. The business route started at a single-point urban interchange with US 36, the Chicago-Kansas City Expressway, and US 61. The route then turned onto Pleasant Avenue and then St. Marys Avenue. The route then turned east and became Broadway (Street). It went through downtown Hannibal and turned north on Route 79. It then terminated at I-72/US 36/Route 110 (CKC).
