= Lake of the Ozarks Community Bridge =

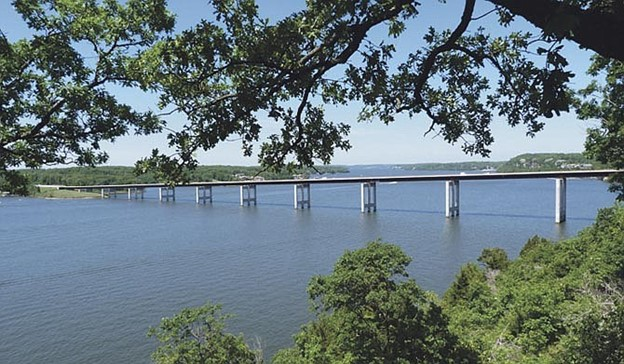
- A view of the bridge in 1998 before opening
- Coordinates: 38.184032°N 92.644248°W
- Carries: 2 lanes of Route MM
- Crosses: Lake of the Ozarks

Characteristics
- Total length: 2,695 ft (821 m)
- Width: 72 ft (22 m)

History
- Construction start: 1996
- Construction end: 1 May 1998
- Construction cost: $43 million ($83 million in 2024)
- Opened: 2 May 1998

Location
- Interactive map of Lake of the Ozarks Community Bridge

The Lake of the Ozarks Community Bridge is a continuous truss bridge in Lake Ozark, Missouri. Opened on May 2, 1998, the bridge connects the east and west sides of the Lake of the Ozarks. The bridge is over 2,695 ft (821 m) long and 72 ft (22 m). Construction on the bridge began in 1996 and the bridge cost over $43 million. To pay for the cost of the bridge, the bridge was established as a toll bridge with varying rates depending on the time of year. It remained a toll bridge until April 30, 2024. The bridge was the only toll road in Missouri prior to the toll being removed.

== History ==
The Lake of the Ozarks Community Bridge Corporation was founded in 1992 to begin development of the bridge. A feasibility study began and was completed in August 1993 showing that the bridge could be a successful project. Construction began in 1996 through Jacobs Engineering Group, and construction was finished on May 1, 1998. An opening ceremony was held that day, and the bridge opened to traffic the next day.

A 2011 proposal envisioned a new highway, Missouri Route 242, leading directly from the bridge to Missouri Route 5 in Sunrise Beach, Missouri, along with further improvements to the bridge itself. Route 242 opened to traffic in December 2011. A financing proposal was submitted to the United States Department of Agriculture for $41 million, but was rejected. The proposal was implemented, but to pay for it, tolls were increased by 50 cents year-round to $3 in-season and $2 out-of-season.

== Tolls ==
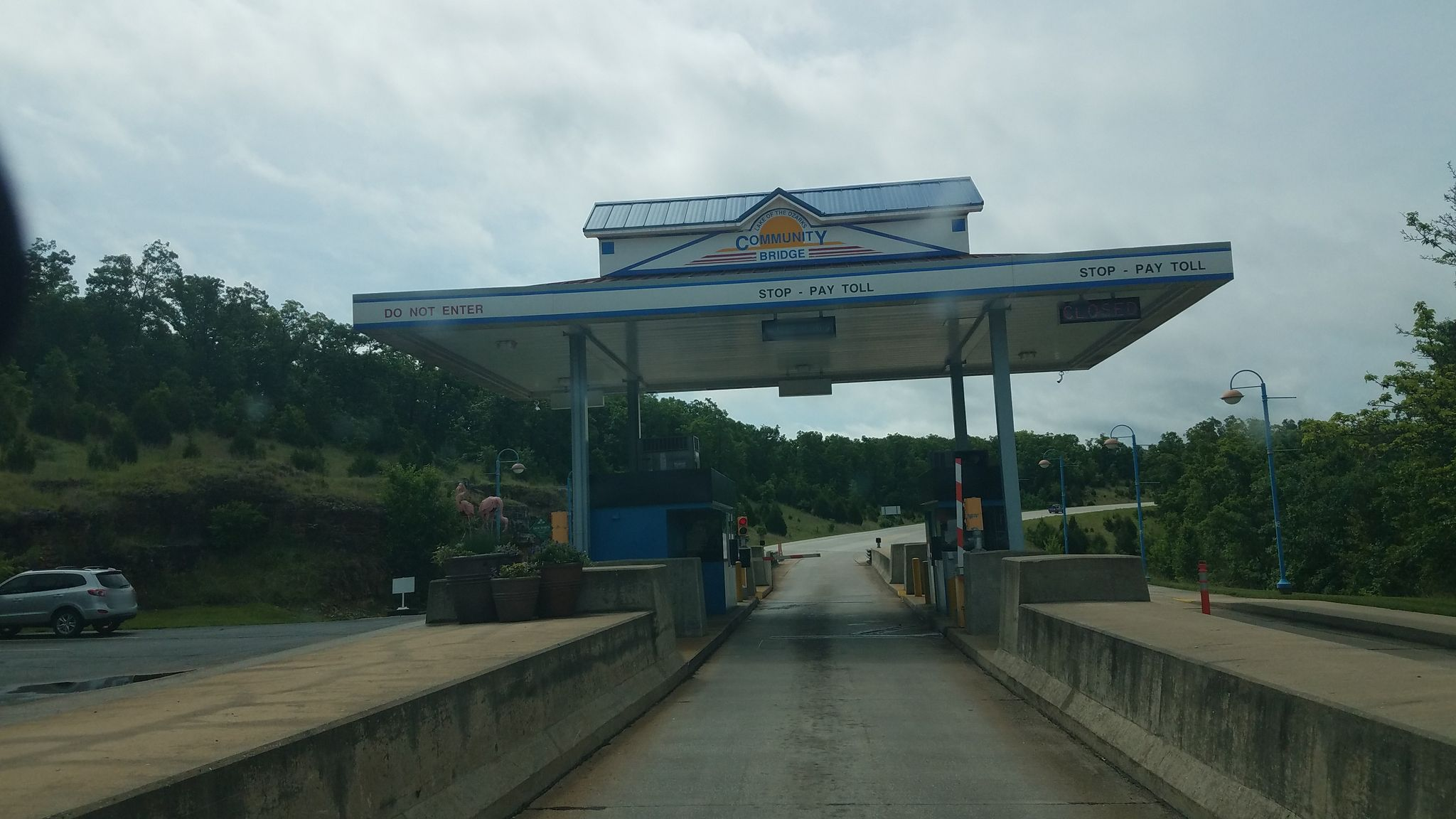
The toll booth serving the bridge

Construction of the bridge has been funded primarily by bridge tolls, mandated for all crossing vehicles. Tolls vary based on the time of year, costing less out-of-season (November through April) than in-season (May through October). Tolls on the bridge are not collected through an auto-collection system, and toll booths have been used throughout the bridge's existence. The toll booth was cash-only or prepaid toll card was accepted. A report found that implementing an auto-collection system would not be cost-effective.

As a result of the COVID-19 pandemic, bridge tolls were suspended in March 2020, but later resumed in May 2020. The suspension of tolls was the only major length of time in which the bridge was free to use.

In February 2024, the Community Bridge Transportation District announced that tolls would stop being collected on the bridge on April 30, 2024, two years earlier than initially estimated, and 18 years ahead of the bond term, as the bridge has been fully paid off. The debt for the bridge was paid off two years ahead of schedule.

The toll booths were removed in 2025.
