= Osage Beach, Missouri =

City in Camden and Miller counties in Missouri, United States

- City
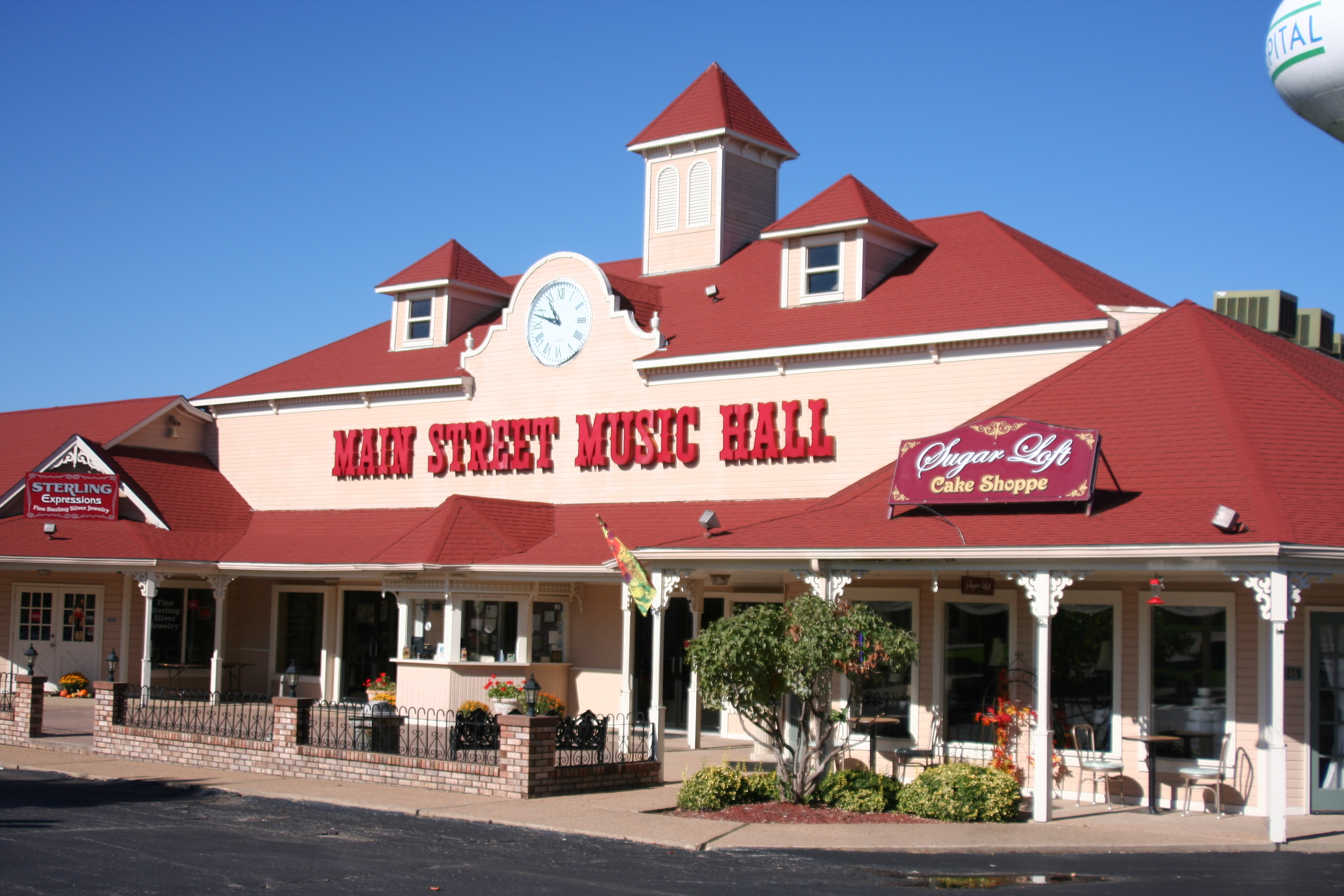
- Main Street Music Hall

- Location of Osage Beach, Missouri
- Coordinates: 38°08′07″N 92°38′52″W
- Country: United States
- State: Missouri
- Counties: Camden; Miller
- Founded: 1886 (as Zebra); 1935 (as Osage Beach)
- Incorporated: 1959

Government
  - Mayor: Richard Ross
  - Administrator: Devin Lake

Area
  - Total: 10.39 sq mi (26.92 km^{2})
  - Land: 9.82 sq mi (25.44 km^{2})
  - Water: 0.57 sq mi (1.48 km^{2})
- Elevation: 656 ft (200 m)

Population (2020)
  - Total: 4,637
  - Density: 472.1/sq mi (182.29/km^{2})
- Time zone: UTC-6 (Central (CST))
  - Summer (DST): UTC-5 (CDT)
- ZIP code: 65065
- Area code: 573
- FIPS code: 29-55244
- GNIS feature ID: 2396089

Osage Beach is a city located in both Camden and Miller counties in Missouri, United States. Situated along the Lake of the Ozarks, the city is a major tourism destination and serves as a regional commercial hub. The city is a center for lodging, shopping, dining, and business activity. Based on 2024 census, the city home to approximately 5,100 residents while welcoming over three million visitors each year.

Osage Beach maintains a park system that includes City Park, Peanick Park, and the Osage Beach Sports Complex, offering recreation areas, ball fields, and walking trails. The city was formally incorporated in 1965.

== History ==
The development of Osage Beach is closely linked to the creation of the Lake of the Ozarks. Osage Beach was founded in 1886 as Zebra before being renamed as Osage Beach in 1935. Osage Beach was incorporated in 1959.

Formation of the Lake: In 1931, the Union Electric Company of St. Louis completed the construction of Bagnell Dam on the Osage River, creating the Lake of the Ozarks. The new reservoir quickly became a draw for visitors interested in boating, fishing, and resort recreation.

Early Development: During the 1930s and 1940s, the shoreline began to see the establishment of cabins, fishing camps, and small businesses catering to lake tourism. The area that would become Osage Beach developed as an accessible point on the lake due to its proximity to U.S. Highway 54.

Incorporation: The City of Osage Beach was first incorporated in 1959. Following a temporary dis-incorporation, voters approved a second and final incorporation in 1965.

Growth: The city grew rapidly as a resort and second-home destination during the 1960s and 1970s. Its central location on the Lake of the Ozarks led to the establishment of marinas, hotels, and resorts. Commercial growth in the 1980s and 1990s included the 1985 opening of the Osage Beach Premium Outlets (originally the Factory Outlet Mall).

== Geography ==
According to the United States Census Bureau, the city has a total area of 10.33 square miles (26.75 km^{2}), of which 9.75 square miles (25.25 km^{2}) is land and 0.58 square miles (1.50 km^{2}) is water. The city is located on the shores of the Lake of the Ozarks.

== Demographics ==
Historical population
| Census | Pop. | Note | %± |
|---|---|---|---|
| 1960 | 741 | | — |
| 1970 | 1,091 | | 47.2% |
| 1980 | 1,992 | | 82.6% |
| 1990 | 2,599 | | 30.5% |
| 2000 | 3,662 | | 40.9% |
| 2010 | 4,351 | | 18.8% |
| 2020 | 4,637 | | 6.6% |
U.S. Decennial Census

=== 2020 census ===
As of the 2020 census, Osage Beach had a population of 4,637. The median age was 51.3 years. 14.8% of residents were under the age of 18 and 27.7% of residents were 65 years of age or older. For every 100 females there were 95.7 males, and for every 100 females age 18 and over there were 94.5 males age 18 and over.

98.8% of residents lived in urban areas, while 1.2% lived in rural areas.

There were 2,187 households in Osage Beach, of which 20.3% had children under the age of 18 living in them. Of all households, 41.6% were married-couple households, 21.9% were households with a male householder and no spouse or partner present, and 28.1% were households with a female householder and no spouse or partner present. About 37.1% of all households were made up of individuals and 14.8% had someone living alone who was 65 years of age or older.

There were 5,031 housing units, of which 56.5% were vacant. The homeowner vacancy rate was 1.4% and the rental vacancy rate was 16.6%.

Racial composition as of the 2020 census
| Race | Number | Percent |
|---|---|---|
| White | 3,992 | 86.1% |
| Black or African American | 89 | 1.9% |
| American Indian and Alaska Native | 21 | 0.5% |
| Asian | 72 | 1.6% |
| Native Hawaiian and Other Pacific Islander | 1 | 0.0% |
| Some other race | 114 | 2.5% |
| Two or more races | 348 | 7.5% |
| Hispanic or Latino (of any race) | 335 | 7.2% |

=== 2010 census ===
At the 2010 census there were 4,351 people, 2,038 households, and 1,166 families living in the city. The population density was 446.3 inhabitants per square mile (172.3/km^{2}). There were 5,261 housing units at an average density of 539.6 per square mile (208.3/km^{2}). The racial makeup of the city was 93.6% White, 1.1% African American, 0.6% Native American, 1.1% Asian, 0.2% Pacific Islander, 2.4% from other races, and 1.1% from two or more races. Hispanic or Latino of any race were 4.8%.

Of the 2,038 households 19.9% had children under the age of 18 living with them, 44.3% were married couples living together, 8.0% had a female householder with no husband present, 5.0% had a male householder with no wife present, and 42.8% were non-families. 35.3% of households were one person and 13% were one person aged 65 or older. The average household size was 2.04 and the average family size was 2.57.

The median age was 48.9 years. 15.8% of residents were under the age of 18; 8.6% were between the ages of 18 and 24; 20.2% were from 25 to 44; 31.3% were from 45 to 64; and 24% were 65 or older. The gender makeup of the city was 48.9% male and 51.1% female.

=== 2000 census ===
At the 2000 census there were 3,662 people, 1,687 households, and 1,035 families living in the city. The population density was 389.8 inhabitants per square mile (150.5/km^{2}). There were 4,055 housing units at an average density of 431.6 per square mile (166.6/km^{2}). The racial makeup of the city was 97.35% White, 0.76% African American, 0.41% Native American, 0.49% Asian, 0.16% from other races, and 0.82% from two or more races. Hispanic or Latino of any race were 1.20% of the total population. Of the 1,687 households 19.1% had children under the age of 18 living with them, 51.2% were married couples living together, 7.2% had a female householder with no husband present, and 38.6% were non-families. 31.6% of households were one person and 10.9% were one person aged 65 or older. The average household size was 2.09 and the average family size was 2.58.

The age distribution was 16.0% under the age of 18, 7.4% from 18 to 24, 26.9% from 25 to 44, 29.3% from 45 to 64, and 20.3% 65 or older. The median age was 45 years. For every 100 females there were 96.8 males. For every 100 females age 18 and over, there were 94.9 males.

The median household income was $38,448 and the median family income was $49,554. Males had a median income of $30,444 versus $21,440 for females. The per capita income for the city was $22,685. About 4.5% of families and 6.7% of the population were below the poverty line, including 5.3% of those under age 18 and 6.4% of those age 65 or over.

== Education ==
=== Schools ===
- Osage Beach Elementary-Camdenton R-III
- School of the Osage (Miller County R-II School District)

=== Colleges and universities ===
- Columbia College - Lake of the Ozarks campus
- State Fair Community College - Lake of the Ozarks campus
- Central Methodist University - Lake of the Ozarks campus

=== Library ===
Osage Beach has a public library, the Osage Beach Library.

== Media ==
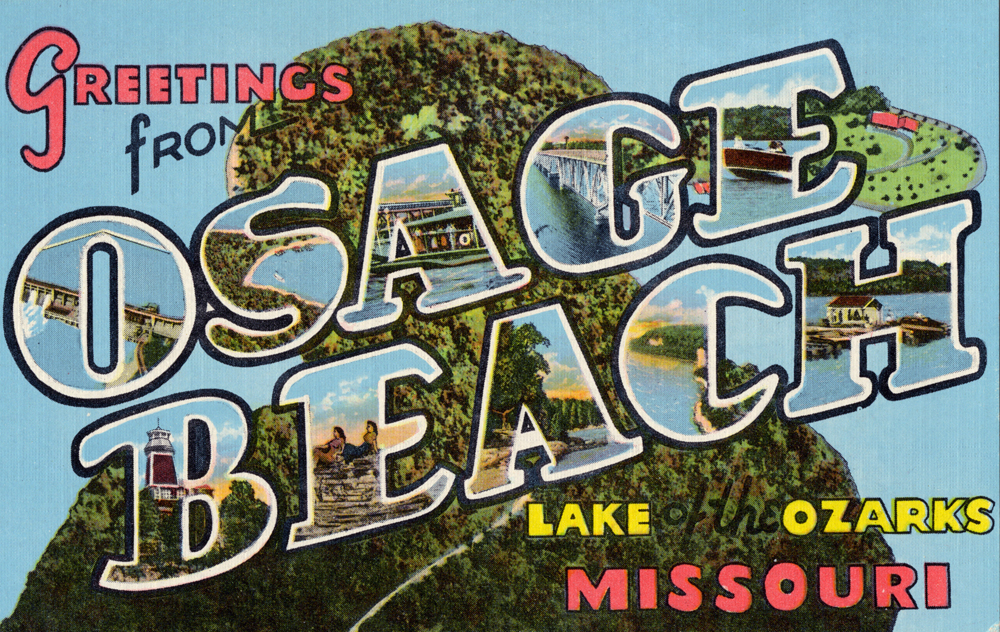
Postcard featuring Osage Beach

Osage Beach is split between two television markets. While Camden County is part of the Springfield television market, Miller County is part of the Columbia/Jefferson City market. Charter Communications' cable system carries stations from both cities. DirecTV and Dish Network subscribers in the city receive Springfield stations, mainly because the bulk of the city is in Camden County.

=== Television ===
The following is a list of television stations that broadcast from and/or are licensed to Osage Beach, Missouri.

| Callsign | Display Channel | Network | City of License | Owner |
|---|---|---|---|---|
| KRMS-LD | 32.1 | Cozi TV | Lake Ozark, Missouri | Viper Communications |
| KRMS-LD | 32.2 | Real America's Voice | Lake Ozark, Missouri | Viper Communications |
| KRMS-LD | 32.3 | NewsMax 2 | Lake Ozark, Missouri | Viper Communications |
| KRMS-LD | 32.4 | YTA TV | Lake Ozark, Missouri | Viper Communications |
| KRMS-LD | 32.5 | Buzzr | Lake Ozark, Missouri | Viper Communications |
| KRMS-LD | 32.6 | Fun Roads TV | Lake Ozark, Missouri | Viper Communications |
| KRMS-LD | 32.7 | Classic Reruns TV | Lake Ozark, Missouri | Viper Communications |
| KRMS-LD | 32.8 | Daystar | Lake Ozark, Missouri | Viper Communications |
| KRMS-LD | 32.9 | WeatherNation | Lake Ozark, Missouri | Viper Communications |
| KRMS-LD | 32.10 | The Country Network | Lake Ozark, Missouri | Viper Communications |
| KRBK | 49.1 | Fox | Osage Beach, Missouri | Nexstar Media |
| KRBK | 49.2 | Antenna TV | Osage Beach, Missouri | Nexstar Media |
| KRBK | 49.3 | Dabl | Osage Beach, Missouri | Nexstar Media |
| KRBK | 49.4 | Ion | Osage Beach, Missouri | Nexstar Media |

=== Radio ===
The following is a list of radio stations that broadcast from and/or are licensed to Osage Beach, Missouri.

| Frequency | Callsign | Nickname | Format | Owner | City of License | Web site |
|---|---|---|---|---|---|---|
| 89.3 | KEYK | The Key Radio | Community Radio | Orion Center, Inc | Osage Beach, MO | |
| 90.3 | KCRL | Bott Radio Network | Christian Talk | Bott Radio | Sunrise Beach, MO | |
| 91.7 | KCVO | Spirit FM | Christian Contemporary | Northwestern Media | Camdenton, MO | |
| 92.7 | KLOZ | Mix 92.7 | Hot AC | Benne Media | Eldon, MO | |
| 93.5 | KRMS-FM | 93.5 Rocks the Lake | Classic Rock | Viper Communications | Osage Beach, MO | |
| 95.1 | KTKS | KS95 | Country | Benne Media | Versailles, MO | |
| 97.5 | K248BP | KRMS | News/Talk | Viper Communications | Osage Beach, MO | |
| 98.7 | K254BE | 98.7 The Cove | Adult Contemporary | Viper Communications | Osage Beach, MO | |
| 100.9 | KCKP | Faith 100.9 | Christian Talk | Northwestern Media | Laurie, MO | |
| 101.9 | KZWV | 101.9 The Wave | Adult Contemporary | Zimmer Radio | Eldon, MO | |
| 102.7 | KQUL | Cool 102.7 | Classic Hits | Benne Media | Lake Ozark, MO | |
| 103.3 | K277DJ | KRMS | News/Talk | Viper Communications | Osage Beach, MO | |
| 104.9 | K285ER | Classic Country 104.9 | Classic Country | Viper Communications | Osage Beach, MO | |
| 107.9 | KCLQ | 107.9 The Coyote | Country | Go Productions | Lebanon, MO | |
| 1150 | KRMS | KRMS | News/Talk | Viper Communications | Osage Beach, MO | |

== Transportation ==
There are two general aviation airports in the Osage Beach area: Grand Glaize-Osage Beach Airport, which is within the city limits, and Lee C. Fine Memorial Airport, which is located about 7 miles (11 km) away in Kaiser.

The nearest primary commercial airports are Columbia Regional Airport (about 65 miles [105 km] away) and Springfield–Branson National Airport (about 93 miles [150 km] away). The smaller Waynesville-St. Robert Regional Airport is about 53 miles (85 km) away.

US Route 54 runs through Osage Beach. US Route 54 runs north to Jefferson City. US Route 54 runs south to Camdenton.

=== Infrastructure ===
As Osage Beach is predominantly a resort town, as such it boasts several tourist attractions and amenities, including an outlet mall in the process of redevelopment.

== Healthcare ==
Osage Beach is home to Lake Regional Hospital. Part of the Lake Regional Health system, this general medical and surgical hospital houses a trauma center and has a total of 116 beds.

== In popular media ==
The TV series Ozark is set in Osage Beach. In November 2017, it was reported that the series helped increase tourism and notoriety of the Lake of the Ozarks, but did not have a significant economic impact. In February 2018, a restaurant called "Marty Byrde's" was opened in Lake Ozark, Missouri, that is inspired by the series, and includes menu items based on the show, including "Ruth's Smoked Wings".

== See also ==
- List of cities in Missouri
