= Industrial City, Missouri =

Former community in Buchanan County, Missouri

Industrial City
- Town
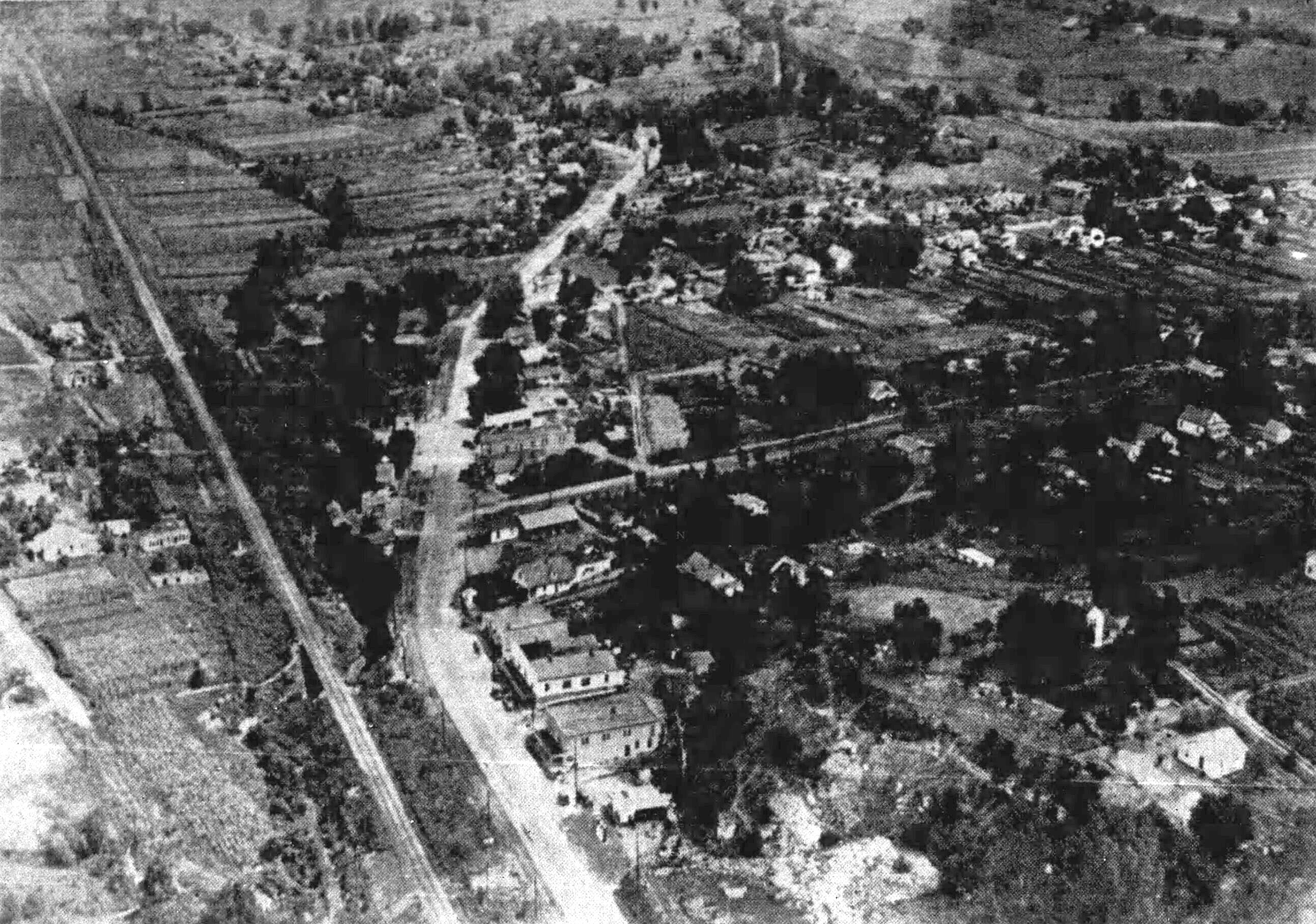
- Industrial City in 1933
- Interactive map of Industrial City
- Location within the state of Missouri Industrial City (the United States)
- Coordinates: 39.8132°N 94.8324°W
- Founded: 1907
- Official naming: 1924
- Merged into St. Joseph, Missouri: 1958

Population (1930)
  - Total: 1,209

Industrial City, also referred to as Green Valley, is a former community in Buchanan County, Missouri, now part of St. Joseph.

Originally planned as a factory site in the 1900s, Industrial City received little attention from manufacturing companies and was instead developed as a residential area known as Green Valley. The settlement continued to grow with the construction of a school, post office, bank and multiple churches. In 1958, it officially became a neighbourhood of St. Joseph.

== History ==
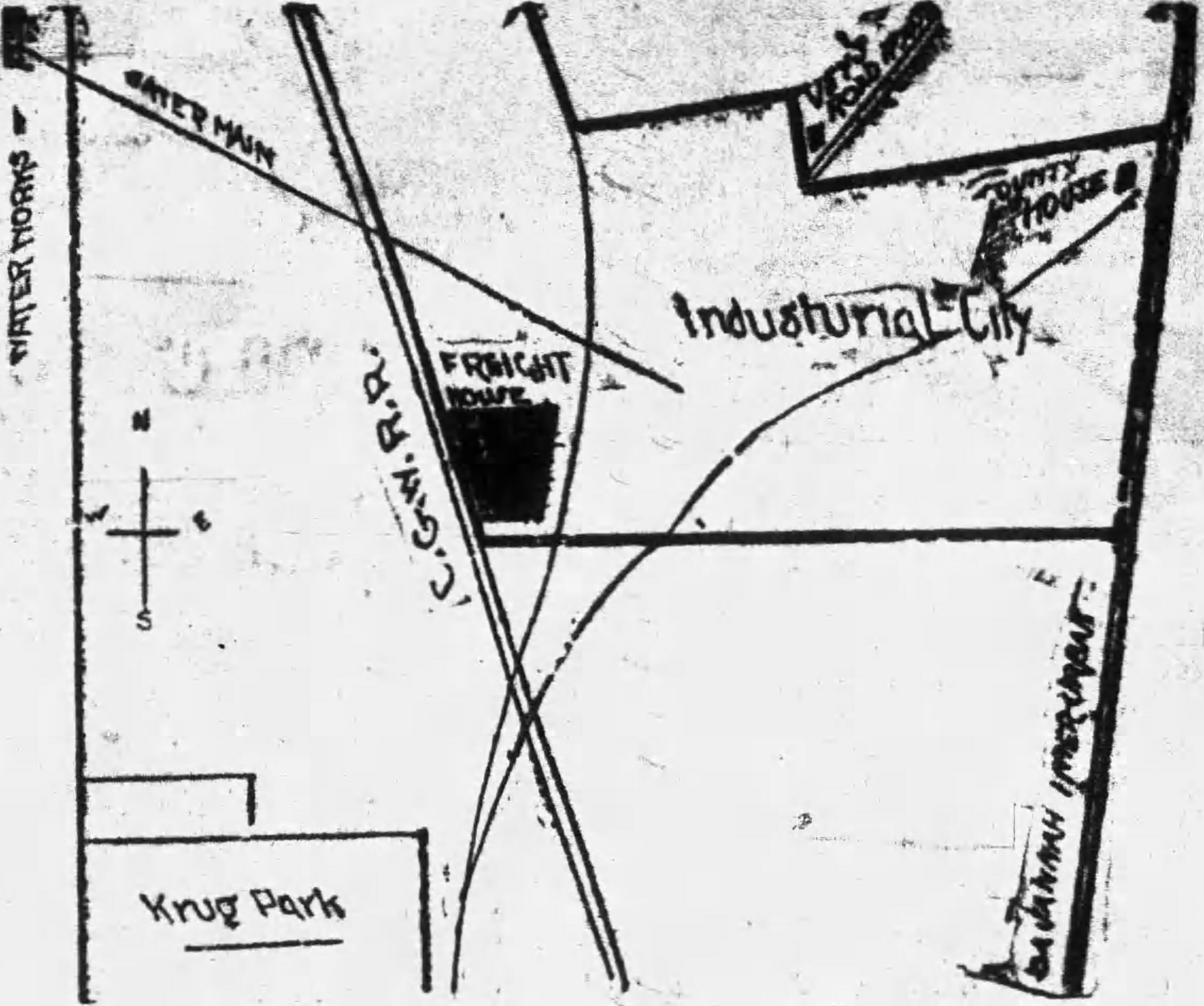
A 1907 map showing the planned location of the Industrial City

In 1907, a group of ten prominent businessmen from St. Joseph announced plans to create a large industrial suburb northeast of Krug Park beyond the city's borders. Located between the road from St. Joseph to Savannah and the Chicago Great Western Railway, the planned factory area was given the name "The Industrial City".

The plans continued with the election of officers for the newly-formed Industrial Development Company in June 1907, following its purchase of 200 acres of land at the site. Alongside the development of factories in the area, the investors planned to extend the streetcar service from Krug Park towards the industrial site. Costs for the single line extension were estimated at US$12,000, and it was officially opened on October 1, 1908.

While investors had managed to secure public transport for the settlement, there were still no businesses present in the area by July 1910. That month it was suggested that the Speciality Shoe Machinery Co. would build its factory there, but those plans fell apart due to the lack of accessible gas, water or power contracts within the site. Similar plans fell apart with a foundry company, which relocated to St. Joseph instead.

=== Green Valley residential development ===
Following the lack of success with industrialisation, the Green Valley Investment Company purchased the Industrial Development Company's 146-acre holdings in April 1911, with the intention of creating a large residential site named "Green Valley". By September 1912, it was estimated that there were 150 children living within the settlement and local residents had begun petitioning for a new school. In September 1915, construction began on the Green Valley School building at a cost of around US$6,500.

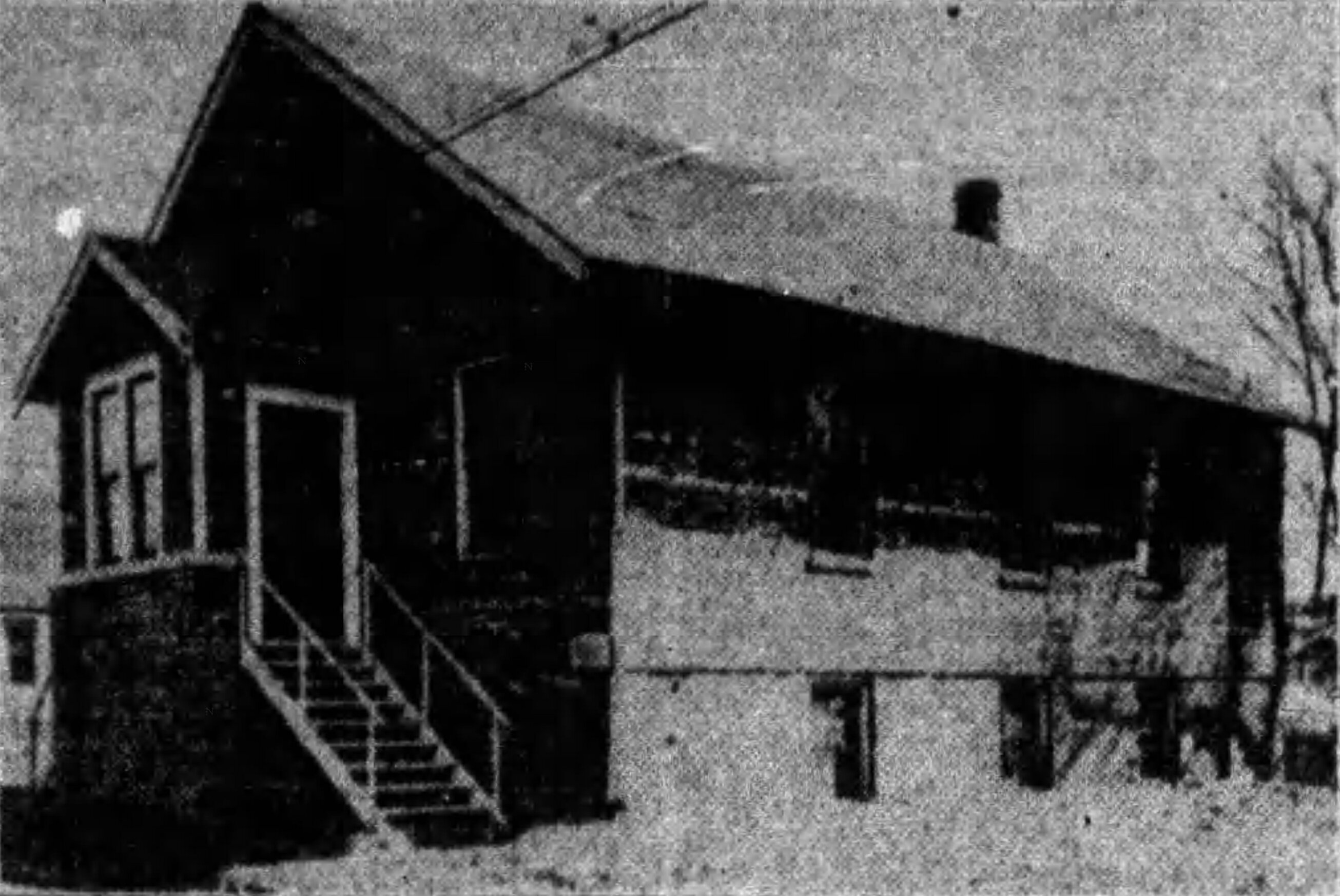
The Community Presbyterian Church, c. 1929

In January 1916, the first Sunday school service was held at Hurst Hall in Industrial City. In October 1922, construction began on the Community Presbyterian Church, a hollow tile building on the junction of Savannah Road and the road towards the Buchanan County Infirmary (Blackwell Road). Around that time, the Reorganized Church of Jesus Christ of Latter Day Saints had built the Fifth Church within the settlement.

In March 1924, the settlement was given its own post office and local businessman F. L. Taulman was named postmaster. With the establishment of the post office, the town officially became known as Industrial City: it dropped the alternative name of "Green Valley" due to the existence of other settlements named Green Valley and Grain Valley. Later that year, the Growers' State Bank opened within the town.

=== Development of infrastructure ===
During the 1920s, the population of Industrial City continued to climb and put pressure on local infrastructure. By February 1925, Green Valley School had a total of 80 children enrolled across four grades and was transporting another 40 children to a nearby school. Plans were made to construct a new school building with six rooms, a multipurpose auditorium-gymnasium, a stage and shower baths. The US$40,000 construction project was finished in early 1926 and the school's former building was demolished that year. It was later renamed after United States Army officer John J. Pershing, retaining the name Pershing Elementary School in the modern day.

In April 1926, plans were announced by the St. Joseph Water Company to construct water mains underneath the town to connect St. Joseph to the nearby country club. Development on Blackwell Road, connecting the east and west Savannah roads through Industrial City, began later that year. The project faced delays over the winter, but resumed the following summer. In 1931, the completion of a new route near the St. Joseph Country Club gave the town better access to U.S. Route 71.

In as early as 1930, there were calls to extend the St. Joseph city limits to incorporate its various suburbs including Industrial City. An article in The St. Joseph Observer suggested that the city might eventually annex the nearby settlements of Agency, De Kalb, Rushville and Industrial City.

In 1958, Industrial City ceased to exist as its own settlement and became a neighbourhood of St. Joseph.

== Geography ==
Industrial City was located near Blacksnake Creek, a tributary of the Missouri River, which flowed naturally through the Blacksnake sewer. The river is prone to flooding and had a flood plain of 8.2 square miles (21 km^{2}) during the 1970s. During the 1920s, the town's western section was accessed by a bridge traversing Blacksnake Creek, but the bridge was destroyed by floodwaters in 1929.

From 1931 onwards, a rock quarry was located directly to the south of the town near Chicago Great Western Railway tracks.

During the 1950s, its two residential areas were separated by the railway.

=== Population ===
According to the 1930 United States census, Industrial City had a population of 1209 people. Residents stated that the population ten years prior was around 250 people. In 1958, Industrial City had a population of between 1,200 and 1,500 people.
