= KRMS-FM =

- Osage Beach, Missouri; United States
- Broadcast area: Lake of the Ozarks
- Frequency: 93.5 MHz (HD Radio)
- Branding: 93.5 Rocks (analog/HD1) "104.9 Classic Country Bangin' The Twang" (HD2) "News/Talk 1150 AM 97.5 FM 103.3 FM KRMS" (HD3) "98.7 The Christmas Station" (HD4)

Programming
- Format: Classic rock
- Subchannels: HD1: KRMS-FM analog HD2: Classic country "Classic Country 104.9"; HD3: News/Talk (KRMS simulcast); HD4: Christmas music "98.7 The Christmas Station"
- Affiliations: Compass Media Networks

Ownership
- Owner: Viper Communications, Inc.
- Sister stations: KRMS, KRMS-LD

History
- First air date: April 1964 (as KRMS-FM)
- Former call signs: KRMS-FM (1964–1980); KYLC (1980–1998); KRMS-FM (1998–2006); KMYK (2006–2021)
- Call sign meaning: Robert M. Smith, original owner of the AM

Technical information
- Licensing authority: FCC
- Facility ID: 35553
- Class: C2
- ERP: 39,000 watts
- HAAT: 168 meters (551 ft)
- Transmitter coordinates: 38°09′52″N 92°36′12″W
- Translators: HD2: 104.9 K285ER (Osage Beach); HD4: 98.7 K254BE (Osage Beach)

Links
- Public license information: Public file; LMS
- Webcast: Listen Live; Listen Live (HD2); Listen Live (HD4)
- Website: 935rocksthelake.com classiccountry1049.com (HD2); 987foxsports.com (HD4)

KRMS-FM (93.5 MHz, "93.5 Rocks") is a radio station licensed to serve Osage Beach, Missouri, United States. The station, originally established in April 1964, is currently owned and operated by Viper Communications, Inc.

== Programming ==
KRMS-FM broadcasts a classic rock format to the Lake of the Ozarks region. In addition to its usual music programming, KRMS-FM broadcasts the high school football games of the Camdenton Lakers and the National Football League games of the Kansas City Chiefs.

== History ==
KRMS-FM was established in April 1964 as an FM sister station to KRMS (1150 AM). Both stations were owned by Central Missouri Broadcasting Company under the co-ownership of James L. Risner and Ella Mae Risner. In October 1979, the Risners agreed to transfer the broadcast license and the station's assets to Lakcom, a limited partnership with Alfred C. Sikes as General Partner. This deal was approved by the Federal Communications Commission (FCC) on January 10, 1980, and consummated on January 16, 1980. The new owners had the FCC change the station's call sign to KYLC on July 4, 1980.

The station was once known as "Lake 94" in the 1980s with an adult contemporary music format. Lakcom L.P. reached an agreement to sell KRMS to a new company called KRMS-KYLC, Inc., in April 1986. The deal was approved by the FCC on May 30, 1986, and the transaction was formally consummated on June 11, 1986. Among the company's investors was United States Senator John C. Danforth. In April 1990, the company, now wholly owned by John B. and Fredna B. Mahaffey, transferred the KRMS broadcast license directly to the Mahaffeys as individuals. They would soon fold the station into Mahaffey Enterprises, Inc.

In September 1997, license holder Mahaffey Enterprises, Inc. reached an agreement to sell KRMS to Viper Communications, Inc. The deal gained FCC approval on October 30, 1997, and the transaction was consummated on November 13, 1997. On January 9, 1998, the new owners (Viper Communications) had the FCC restore its previous KRMS-FM call sign. The station was assigned the call sign KMYK by the FCC on September 30, 2006, as the station flipped to from classic rock to variety hits, branded as "93.5 Mike FM". This format eventually evolved into a Modern and Classic Rock mix, eventually changing from Mike FM to the present 93.5 ROCKS.

On December 20, 2021, Viper once again restored 93.5's original call letters KRMS-FM, releasing the KMYK call letters that were in place since 2006.

== HD Radio ==
KRMS-HD4 logo until January 2026

In February 2018, KRMS-FM launched a classic country format on its HD2 subchannel, branded as "Classic Country 104.9" (simulcast on translator K285ER Osage Beach).

KRMS-FM also airs a simulcast of news/talk-formatted KRMS 1150 AM Osage Beach on its HD3 subchannel and airs an adult standards format on its HD4 subchannel, branded as "98.7 The Cove".

On January 2, 2026, KRMS-HD4 changed their format from soft AC to sports, branded as "Fox Sports 98.7".

On November 2, 2026, KRMS-HD4 dropped the sports format and began stunting with Christmas music as "98.7 The Christmas Station".
