= KRMS (AM) =

- Osage Beach, Missouri; United States
- Broadcast area: Lake of the Ozarks
- Frequency: 1150 kHz
- Branding: NewsTalk 1150 KRMS

Programming
- Language: English
- Format: News/talk
- Affiliations: Fox News Radio; Compass Media Networks; Genesis Communications Network; Premiere Networks; Salem Radio Network; USA Radio Network; Westwood One

Ownership
- Owner: Viper Communications, Inc.
- Sister stations: KRMS-FM, KRMS-LD

History
- First air date: December 1952
- Call sign meaning: Robert M. Smith (original owner)

Technical information
- Licensing authority: FCC
- Facility ID: 35554
- Class: D
- Power: 840 watts day 55 watts night
- Transmitter coordinates: 38°7′29″N 92°40′39″W
- Translators: 97.5 K248BP (Osage Beach); 103.3 K277DJ (Osage Beach)
- Repeater: 93.5 KRMS-HD3 (Osage Beach)

Links
- Public license information: Public file; LMS
- Webcast: Listen Live
- Website: krmsradio.com

KRMS (1150 kHz, "News/Talk KRMS, 1150 AM - 97.5 FM - 103.3 FM") is an AM radio station licensed to serve Osage Beach, Missouri, United States. The station, established in December 1952, is owned by Viper Communications, Inc., and broadcasts news/talk programming to central Missouri.

== Programming ==
KRMS broadcasts a news/talk/sports format to Osage Beach and the greater Lake of the Ozarks area. Weekday programming includes nationally syndicated talk shows hosted by Rush Limbaugh, Dave Ramsey, Mark Levin, and Jim Bohannon. Local weekday programs include Ozarks This Morning with KB, The Morning Magazine, and The Ozarks Today with Bill Thrill. Overnight programming features Coast to Coast AM with George Noory. KRMS is also home to the Bob's No Wake Zone boating radio show and is the broadcast home for the Lake of the Ozark's Shootout and Lake Race powerboat races.

== History ==
=== The beginning ===
This station began regular daytime-only broadcast operations in December 1952 under the ownership of broadcast license holder and station president Robert M. Smith. Broadcasting with 1,000 watts of power on an assigned frequency of 1150 kHz, the new station was assigned the call sign KRMS by the Federal Communications Commission (FCC). The station's initial staff included general manager was Ed Gardiner, chief engineer Wally Clark, news director Hal Martin, and program director M.T. Gardiner.

In 1954, Smith transferred the broadcast license for KRMS to a new company, Central Missouri Broadcasting, of which he was president and majority owner. About a year later, in 1955, KRMS was sold to Lawrence Broadcasters, Inc. This new license holder was run by company president A.P. D'Ambra and general manager Arden Booth.

=== Risner era ===
The station was sold again on May 27, 1959, to Central Missouri Broadcasting Company under the co-ownership of James L. Risner and Ella Mae Risner. James Risner also served as the station's general manager, chief engineer, and commercial manager. Ella Mae Risner worked as the station's program director and promotions manager. Aside from signing-on FM sister station KRMS-FM in April 1964, this owner/operator situation would remain unchanged through the end of the 1970s.

In October 1979, the Risners agreed to transfer the broadcast license and the station's assets to Lakcom, a limited partnership with Alfred C. Sikes as General Partner. This deal was approved by the FCC on January 10, 1980, and consummated on January 16, 1980. The new owners maintained the country format on the AM (KRMS) and programmed the FM (KYLC) as an oldies-based adult contemporary station. Minority owner and general manager, Rod Orr, went on to purchase the radio stations, clearing the way for Sikes to be nominated Chair of the FCC.

=== Decade of change ===
Lakcom L.P. reached an agreement to sell KRMS to a new company called KRMS-KYLC, Inc., in April 1986. The deal was approved by the FCC on May 30, 1986, and the transaction was formally consummated on June 11, 1986. Among the company's investors was United States Senator John C. Danforth. In April 1990, the company, now wholly owned by John B. and Fredna B. Mahaffey, transferred the KRMS broadcast license directly to the Mahaffeys as individuals. They would soon fold the station into Mahaffey Enterprises, Inc.

In September 1997, license holder Mahaffey Enterprises, Inc. reached an agreement to sell KRMS to Viper Communications, Inc., Consisting of a former 2 time employee Ken Kuenzie. The deal gained FCC approval on October 30, 1997, and the transaction was consummated on November 13, 1997. As of August 2010, Viper Communications remains the owner and operator of KRMS and KMYK.

== Construction permit ==
KRMS has been granted an FCC construction permit to relocate the tower used during the day and decrease day power to 840 watts.

== Former on-air personalities ==
Jerry Adams, a KRMS radio host and star of the regional television show Jerry Adams Outdoors, died in August 2010 after a brief illness. On his show, Adams and a guest would go fishing or hunting at sites across the Midwest.

== Translator ==
In addition to its primary transmitter, KRMS uses two FM translators to extend or improve its signal coverage area.

Call sign	Frequency	City of license	FID	ERP (W)	HAAT	Class	FCC info
K248BP	97.5 FM	Osage Beach, Missouri	140757	150	180.9 m (594 ft)	D	LMS
K277DJ	103.3 FM	Osage Beach, Missouri	200627	250	152 m (499 ft)	D	LMS
