= Buchanan County Infirmary =

- U.S. National Register of Historic Places
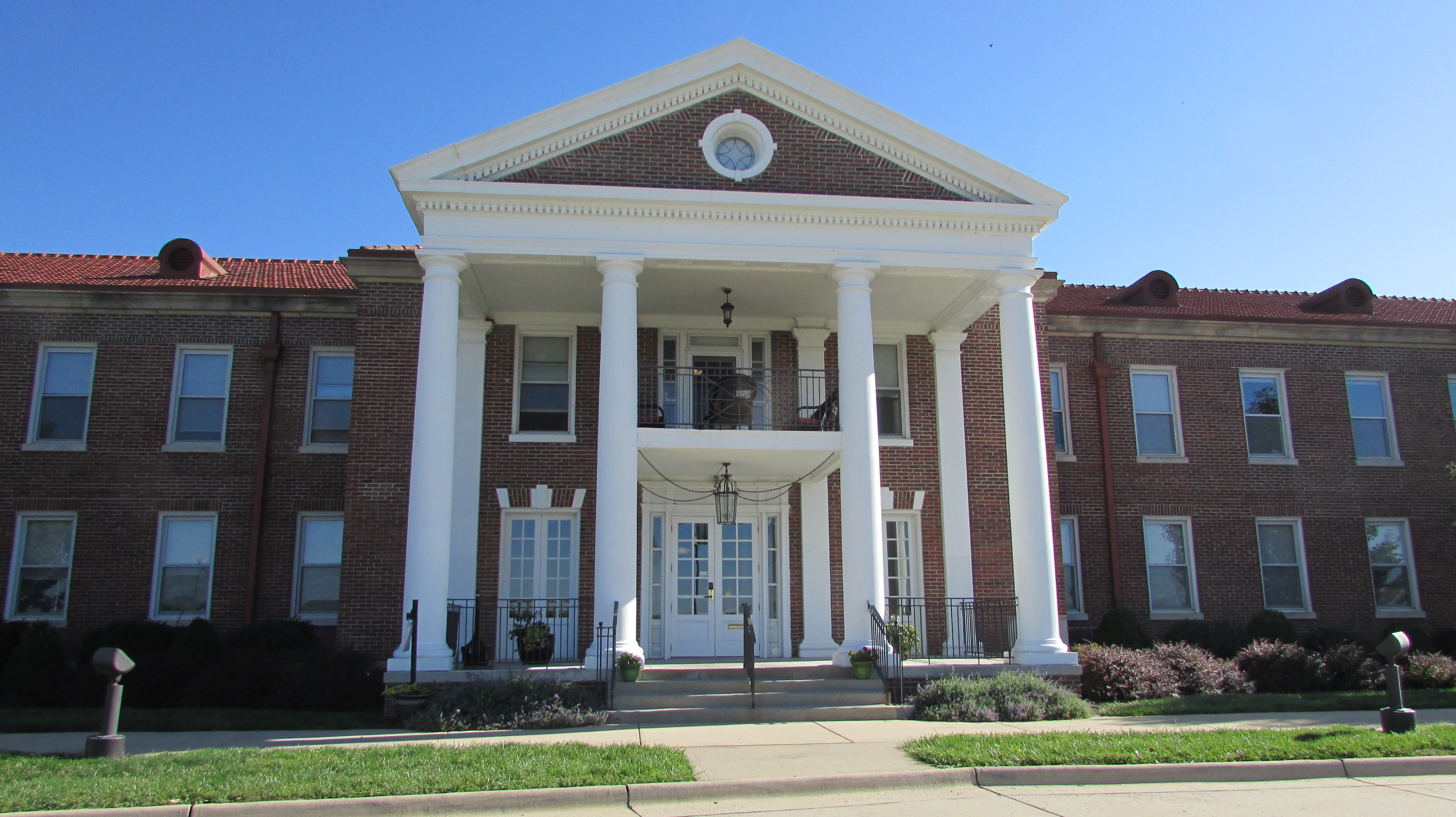

- Location within Missouri Location within the United States
- Location: 3500 N. Village Dr., St. Joseph, Missouri
- Coordinates: 39°49′9″N 94°48′41″W
- Area: 2.8 acres (1.1 ha)
- Built: 1919
- Architect: Meier, Rudolph; Arnhold, Ray
- Architectural style: Classical Revival
- NRHP reference No.: 08001386
- Added to NRHP: January 29, 2009

Buchanan County Infirmary, also known as Buchanan County Poor Farm and Green Acres, is a historic hospital building located in St. Joseph, Missouri, United States. It was built in 1919, and is a two-story, F-shaped Classical Revival-style building with a "fireproof' concrete structure, brick walls, and a cross-hip roof clad with red ceramic tiles. It features a central porch with four full-height concrete Doric order columns that support a projecting, pedimented roof. It is the last surviving structure of the Buchanan County Poor Farm.

It was listed on the National Register of Historic Places in 2009.
