= NOST =

American broadcast television network

NOST - The Nostalgia Network
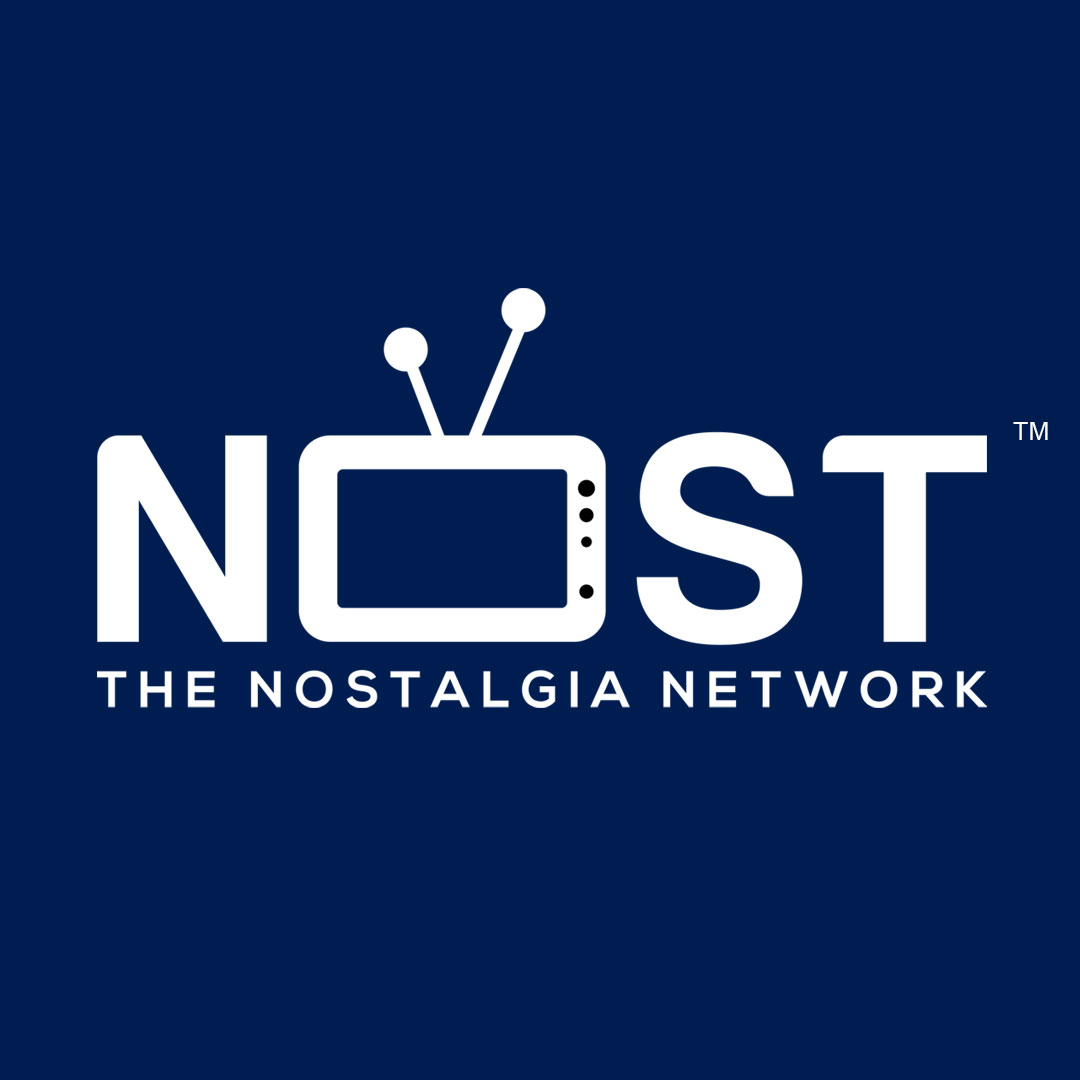
- Type: Broadcast television network
- Country: United States
- Headquarters: Destin, Florida

Programming
- Picture format: 1080p High-definition

Ownership
- Owner: Classic Broadcasting, LLC.

History
- Launched: September 21, 2020; 5 years ago
- Former names: Classic Reruns TV (2020–2023)

Links
- Website: www.watchnost.com

Availability

Streaming media
- Service(s): Dish Network, DistroTV, Sling Freestream, FreeCast, KlowdTV, LiveTVx, RiverTV, Stremium, ZipWave TV

NOST – The Nostalgia Network is a classic film-focused television network dedicated to showcasing feature films from the mid-20th century, along with curated programming blocks and original presentation formats. The network’s content emphasizes timeless storytelling, iconic performances, and the cultural legacy of Hollywood’s studio era.

Programming on NOST is organized into branded blocks that reflect different genres and audience experiences, including primetime features, comedy showcases, and late-night genre films. The network also supports its broadcast schedule with digital editorial content, including articles, film histories, and curated recommendations that provide additional context for viewers.

Through its combination of traditional broadcast distribution and streaming availability, NOST operates as a hybrid linear and digital network, targeting audiences interested in classic cinema and nostalgic entertainment.

== History and description ==
The network was originally launched on September 21, 2020, as Classic Reruns TV, a streaming-based channel that primarily featured classic American television series from the 1950s through the 1970s. Early programming included syndicated reruns of series such as The Beverly Hillbillies, Dragnet, The Patty Duke Show, and Bonanza.

In 2021, the network expanded from a video-on-demand model into a 24-hour linear channel distributed over-the-air via digital subchannels and through streaming platforms. This transition marked its entry into the broader U.S. multicast television landscape, where it competed alongside other nostalgia-focused networks.

On April 3, 2023, Classic Reruns TV was rebranded as NOST – The Nostalgia Network, reflecting a strategic shift in programming and brand identity. The network moved away from primarily television-based content and repositioned itself as a movie-centric network, focusing on classic films spanning the 1940s through the early 1980s.

Following the rebrand, NOST developed a curated programming approach centered on themed scheduling blocks, including primetime film showcases, comedy blocks, and late-night genre programming. The network emphasizes “classic Hollywood” storytelling, highlighting well-known actors, directors, and culturally significant films. In addition to its film library, NOST offers hosted programming and editorial content to provide historical context and foster audience engagement.

NOST is distributed through a combination of over-the-air affiliates and digital streaming platforms, including free ad-supported television (FAST) services. The network positions itself as a destination for viewers seeking classic films, curated programming experiences, and nostalgic entertainment rooted in mid-20th-century cinema.
