= Lake Ozark, Missouri =

City in Camden and Miller counties in Missouri, United States

- City
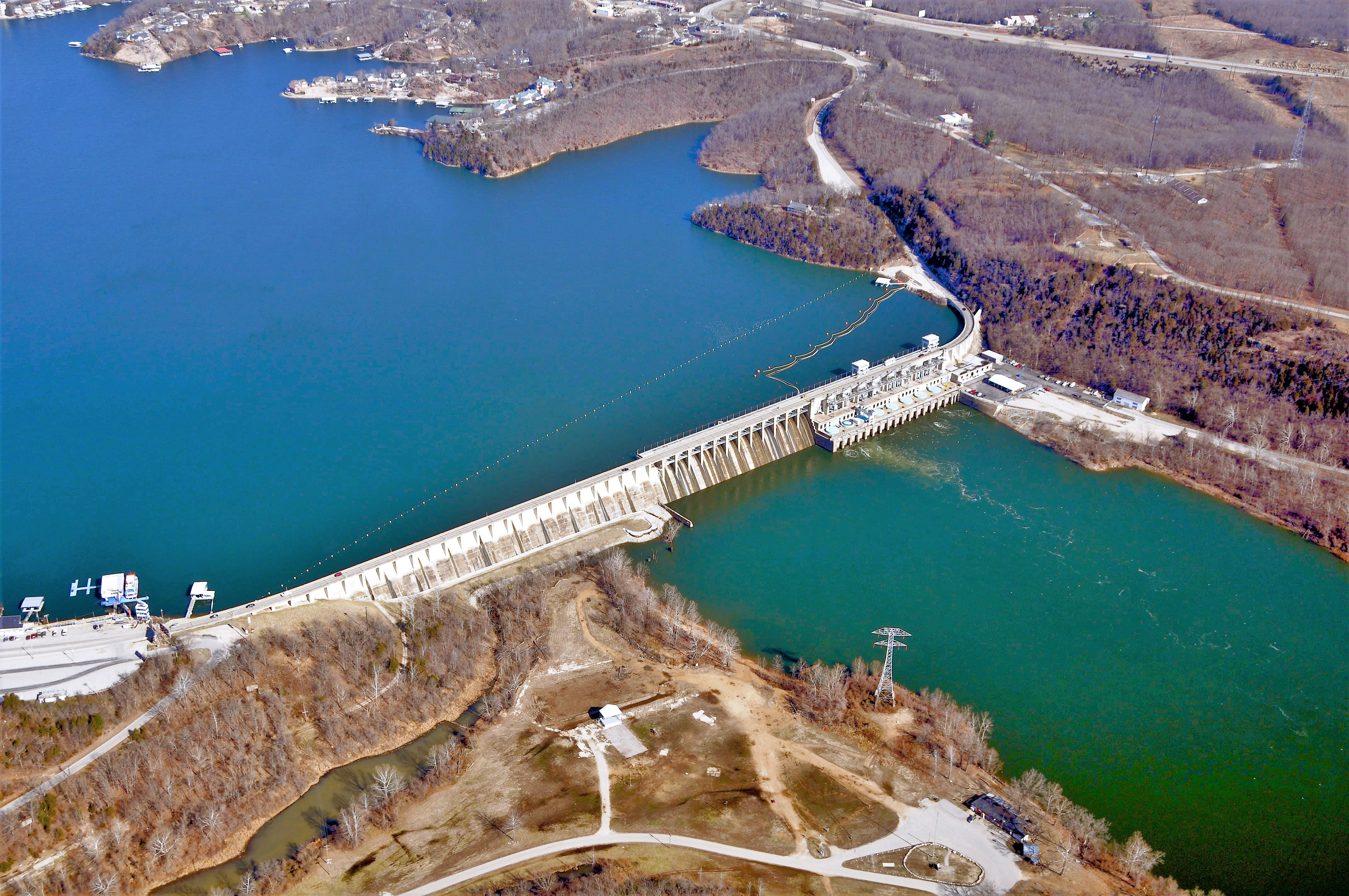
- Bagnell Dam

- Location in Miller County and the state of Missouri
- Coordinates: 38°11′21″N 92°37′47″W
- Country: United States
- State: Missouri
- Counties: Miller; Camden
- Named after: Lake of the Ozarks

Government
  - Mayor: David Ridgely
  - City Administrator: Harrison Fry

Area
  - Total: 7.91 sq mi (20.48 km^{2})
  - Land: 7.19 sq mi (18.62 km^{2})
  - Water: 0.72 sq mi (1.87 km^{2})
- Elevation: 623 ft (190 m)

Population (2020)
  - Total: 2,077
  - Density: 289.0/sq mi (111.57/km^{2})
- Time zone: UTC-6 (Central (CST))
  - Summer (DST): UTC-5 (CDT)
- ZIP code: 65049
- Area code: 573
- FIPS code: 29-40034
- GNIS feature ID: 2395596
- Website: cityoflakeozark.net

Lake Ozark is a city in Camden and Miller counties in Missouri, United States, near its namesake, the Lake of the Ozarks. The population was 2,077 at the 2020 census.

== History ==
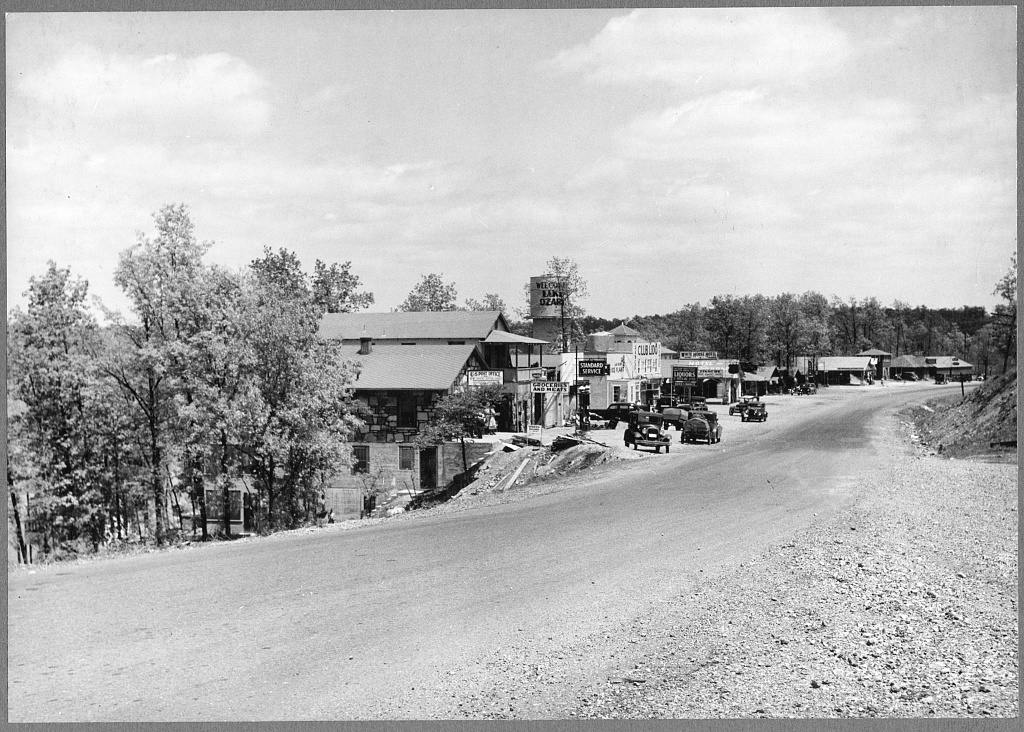
Lake Ozark in May 1936 as photographed by Carl Mydans

A post office called Lake Ozark has been in operation since 1932. The community took its name from the nearby Lake of the Ozarks.

Bagnell Dam was added to the National Register of Historic Places in 2008.

The segment of Bagnell Dam Boulevard from Horse Bend Parkway to the Bagnell Dam is named "Bagnell Dam Strip." There are two muffler mans named Injun Joe and another named Country Bumpkin. The latter was gone from 2013 until 2024. It suffered damage on the shoe part from vandalism a few weeks after returning.

== Geography ==
The city is in western Miller County, with a portion crossing into eastern Camden County. The city sits at the northeast (downstream) end of the Lake of the Ozarks, with the lakeshore forming portions of the city's western border. The city is bordered to the northeast by the town of Bagnell and to the south by the city of Osage Beach. Lake Ozark encircles the smaller, inactive city of Lakeside.

U.S. Route 54 passes through the east side of the city, while Route 54 Business passes through the center. US 54 leads north 12 miles (19 km) to Eldon and northeast 41 miles (66 km) to Jefferson City, the state capital, while to the south it passes through Osage Beach and leads 12 miles (19 km) to Camdenton. The Lake of the Ozarks Community Bridge carries Highway MM across the lake from the southwest part of the city; the highway leads west 9 miles (14 km) to Sunrise Beach.

According to the U.S. Census Bureau, the city of Lake Ozark has a total area of 7.91 square miles (20.49 km^{2}), of which 7.19 square miles (18.62 km^{2}) are land and 0.72 square miles (1.86 km^{2}), or 9.10%, are water.

=== Climate ===
Lake Ozark has a humid subtropical climate. Summers are hot and humid, with thunderstorms and other severe weather common. Winters are generally cold with mild periods, but the temperature of the lake can alter the climate with heavy fog and milder weather than other municipalities further away from the lake. Winters also consist of occasional snowfall of about 10 inches per year.

Climate data for Lake Ozark, Missouri (1991–2020 normals, extremes 1931–present)
Month	Jan	Feb	Mar	Apr	May	Jun	Jul	Aug	Sep	Oct	Nov	Dec	Year
Record high °F (°C)	79 (26)	81 (27)	87 (31)	94 (34)	102 (39)	106 (41)	114 (46)	110 (43)	106 (41)	95 (35)	87 (31)	79 (26)	114 (46)
Mean maximum °F (°C)	65.8 (18.8)	70.8 (21.6)	78.1 (25.6)	84.4 (29.1)	88.3 (31.3)	92.1 (33.4)	96.9 (36.1)	97.2 (36.2)	91.7 (33.2)	85.9 (29.9)	75.4 (24.1)	67.7 (19.8)	98.6 (37.0)
Mean daily maximum °F (°C)	44.0 (6.7)	48.7 (9.3)	59.0 (15.0)	69.1 (20.6)	76.9 (24.9)	85.0 (29.4)	89.4 (31.9)	88.3 (31.3)	81.1 (27.3)	70.5 (21.4)	58.5 (14.7)	47.9 (8.8)	68.2 (20.1)
Daily mean °F (°C)	34.6 (1.4)	38.7 (3.7)	48.0 (8.9)	57.9 (14.4)	66.3 (19.1)	75.0 (23.9)	79.5 (26.4)	78.2 (25.7)	70.8 (21.6)	59.9 (15.5)	48.7 (9.3)	38.9 (3.8)	58.0 (14.4)
Mean daily minimum °F (°C)	25.3 (−3.7)	28.6 (−1.9)	37.1 (2.8)	46.8 (8.2)	55.7 (13.2)	65.0 (18.3)	69.5 (20.8)	68.2 (20.1)	60.5 (15.8)	49.2 (9.6)	38.9 (3.8)	29.9 (−1.2)	47.9 (8.8)
Mean minimum °F (°C)	5.5 (−14.7)	10.2 (−12.1)	18.7 (−7.4)	30.7 (−0.7)	40.5 (4.7)	53.0 (11.7)	59.2 (15.1)	58.2 (14.6)	45.7 (7.6)	33.1 (0.6)	22.3 (−5.4)	11.8 (−11.2)	2.5 (−16.4)
Record low °F (°C)	−15 (−26)	−13 (−25)	−10 (−23)	18 (−8)	30 (−1)	41 (5)	45 (7)	43 (6)	33 (1)	19 (−7)	6 (−14)	−15 (−26)	−15 (−26)
Average precipitation inches (mm)	2.15 (55)	2.05 (52)	2.99 (76)	4.98 (126)	5.54 (141)	4.16 (106)	3.83 (97)	4.20 (107)	4.16 (106)	3.42 (87)	2.97 (75)	2.12 (54)	42.57 (1,081)
Average snowfall inches (cm)	1.7 (4.3)	0.6 (1.5)	0.3 (0.76)	0.0 (0.0)	0.0 (0.0)	0.0 (0.0)	0.0 (0.0)	0.0 (0.0)	0.0 (0.0)	0.0 (0.0)	0.0 (0.0)	1.7 (4.3)	4.3 (11)
Average precipitation days (≥ 0.01 in)	6.6	6.3	9.6	10.4	11.8	9.4	7.9	7.9	7.6	7.7	7.1	6.5	98.8
Average snowy days (≥ 0.1 in)	1.1	0.3	0.1	0.0	0.0	0.0	0.0	0.0	0.0	0.0	0.0	0.4	1.9
Source: NOAA

== Demographics ==
Historical population
Census	Pop.	Note	%±
1970	507		—
1980	534		5.3%
1990	681		27.5%
2000	1,489		118.6%
2010	1,586		6.5%
2020	2,077		31.0%
U.S. Decennial Census

=== 2020 census ===
As of the 2020 census, Lake Ozark had a population of 2,077. The median age was 47.8 years. 20.4% of residents were under the age of 18 and 23.8% of residents were 65 years of age or older. For every 100 females there were 91.3 males, and for every 100 females age 18 and over there were 89.5 males age 18 and over.

33.8% of residents lived in urban areas, while 66.2% lived in rural areas.

There were 919 households in Lake Ozark, of which 25.9% had children under the age of 18 living in them. Of all households, 49.0% were married-couple households, 16.1% were households with a male householder and no spouse or partner present, and 27.4% were households with a female householder and no spouse or partner present. About 28.6% of all households were made up of individuals and 14.0% had someone living alone who was 65 years of age or older.

There were 1,887 housing units, of which 51.3% were vacant. The homeowner vacancy rate was 4.9% and the rental vacancy rate was 14.4%.

Racial composition as of the 2020 census
Race	Number	Percent
White	1,919	92.4%
Black or African American	22	1.1%
American Indian and Alaska Native	10	0.5%
Asian	6	0.3%
Native Hawaiian and Other Pacific Islander	0	0.0%
Some other race	12	0.6%
Two or more races	108	5.2%
Hispanic or Latino (of any race)	41	2.0%

=== 2010 census ===
As of the census of 2010, there were 1,586 people, 715 households, and 455 families living in the city. The population density was 219.4 inhabitants per square mile (84.7/km^{2}). There were 1,688 housing units at an average density of 233.5 per square mile (90.2/km^{2}). The racial makeup of the city was 96.5% White, 0.2% African American, 0.7% Native American, 0.8% Asian, 0.2% Pacific Islander, 0.3% from other races, and 1.3% from two or more races. Hispanic or Latino of any race were 1.2% of the population.

There were 715 households, of which 25.5% had children under the age of 18 living with them, 52.9% were married couples living together, 7.6% had a female householder with no husband present, 3.2% had a male householder with no wife present, and 36.4% were non-families. 29.8% of all households were made up of individuals, and 9.4% had someone living alone who was 65 years of age or older. The average household size was 2.22 and the average family size was 2.71.

The median age in the city was 48 years. 19.2% of residents were under the age of 18; 6.5% were between the ages of 18 and 24; 19.7% were from 25 to 44; 36.9% were from 45 to 64; and 17.7% were 65 years of age or older. The gender makeup of the city was 51.3% male and 48.7% female.

=== 2000 census ===
As of the census of 2000, there were 1,489 people, 649 households, and 427 families living in the city. The population density was 211.6 inhabitants per square mile (81.7/km^{2}). There were 1,143 housing units at an average density of 162.4 per square mile (62.7/km^{2}). The racial makeup of the city was 96.24% White, 1.34% Native American, 0.47% Asian, 0.40% African American, 0.47% from other races, and 1.07% from two or more races. Hispanic or Latino of any race were 2.15% of the population.

There were 649 households, out of which 26.5% had children under the age of 18 living with them, 53.5% were married couples living together, 8.8% had a female householder with no husband present, and 34.1% were non-families. 28.4% of all households were made up of individuals, and 6.3% had someone living alone who was 65 years of age or older. The average household size was 2.29 and the average family size was 2.76.

In the city, the population was spread out, with 21.6% under the age of 18, 7.7% from 18 to 24, 26.7% from 25 to 44, 30.5% from 45 to 64, and 13.6% who were 65 years of age or older. The median age was 41 years. For every 100 females there were 103.1 males. For every 100 females age 18 and over, there were 104.4 males.

The median income for a household in the city was $37,386, and the median income for a family was $40,515. Males had a median income of $26,750 versus $21,667 for females. The per capita income for the city was $20,830. About 11.3% of families and 13.1% of the population were below the poverty line, including 19.2% of those under age 18 and 5.8% of those age 65 or over.

== Infrastructure ==
=== Roads ===
Route 242 (MO 242), a four-lane highway which connects the Lake of the Ozarks Community Bridge to U.S. Highway 54, opened in December 2011. At the junction of US 54 and Route W in the northern part of Lake Ozark, an interchange was completed in 2021 to replace a spotlight intersection.

== See also ==
- List of cities in Missouri
