= Williamsburg Township, Kansas =

Williamsburg Township
- Township
- Location in Franklin County
- Coordinates: 38°26′55″N 095°26′03″W
- Country: United States
- State: Kansas
- County: Franklin

Area
  - Total: 56.43 sq mi (146.15 km^{2})
  - Land: 55.89 sq mi (144.76 km^{2})
  - Water: 0.54 sq mi (1.39 km^{2}) 0.95%
- Elevation: 1,129 ft (344 m)

Population (2020)
  - Total: 696
  - Density: 12.5/sq mi (4.81/km^{2})
- GNIS feature ID: 0479627

Williamsburg Township is a township in Franklin County, Kansas, United States. As of the 2020 census, its population was 696. It was named for the community of Williamsburg.

== Geography ==
Williamsburg Township covers an area of 56.43 square miles (146.2 km^{2}) and contains one incorporated settlement, Williamsburg. According to the USGS, it contains one cemetery, Mount Hope.

The stream of Mill Creek runs through this township.

== Adjacent Townships ==
- Greenwood Township, Franklin County (north)
- Homewood Township, Franklin County (northeast)
- Ohio Township, Franklin County (east)
- Richmond Township, Franklin County (east)
- Putnam Township, Anderson County (southeast)
- Reeder Township, Anderson County (south)
- Rock Creek Township, Coffey County (southwest)
- Lincoln Township, Osage County (west)

== Communities ==
- Ransomville
- Silkville
- Williamsburg

== Points of interest ==
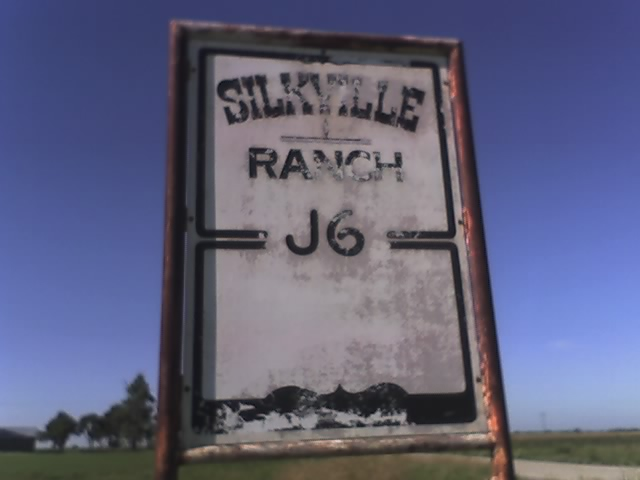
Silkville Ranch sign.

- Silkville. Founded by Ernest de Boissiere in 1870, Silkville was based entirely on the silk industry. The small community thrived until 1892 when de Boissiere donated the ranch to the Independent Order of Odd Fellows and returned to France.
