= Willow Springs Township, Kansas =

Willow Springs Township
- Township
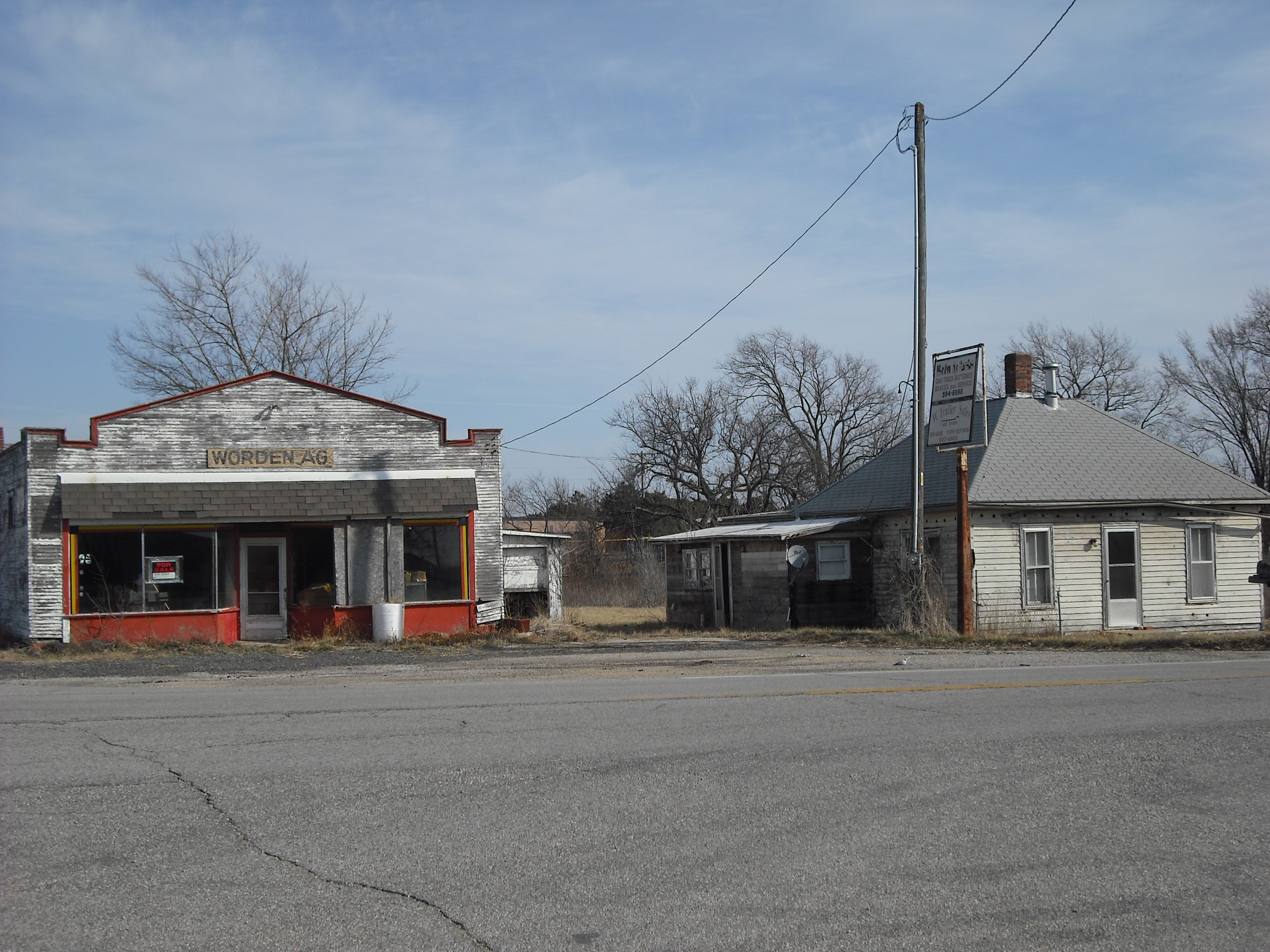
- Worden (2009)

- Location in Douglas County
- Coordinates: 38°48′20″N 095°18′01″W
- Country: United States
- State: Kansas
- County: Douglas

Area
  - Total: 54.55 sq mi (141.29 km^{2})
  - Land: 54.26 sq mi (140.52 km^{2})
  - Water: 0.30 sq mi (0.77 km^{2}) 0.54%
- Elevation: 1,099 ft (335 m)

Population (2020)
  - Total: 1,517
  - Density: 27.96/sq mi (10.80/km^{2})
- GNIS feature ID: 0479497

Willow Springs Township is a township in Douglas County, Kansas, United States. As of the 2020 census, its population was 1,517.

== History ==
Willow Springs Township was formed in 1856. It was named after a small watering stop along the Santa Fe Trail.

== Geography ==
Willow Springs Township covers an area of 54.55 square miles (141.3 km^{2}) and contains no incorporated settlements. According to the USGS, it contains four cemeteries: Bethel, Flory, Sutton and Worden.

The stream of Chicken Creek runs through this township.

== Adjacent townships ==
- Clinton Township, Douglas County (northwest)
- Wakarusa Township, Douglas County (northeast)
- Palmyra Township, Douglas County (east)
- Hayes Township, Franklin County (southeast)
- Centropolis Township, Franklin County (southwest)
- Marion Township, Douglas County (west)

== Communities ==
Although these towns may not be incorporated or populated, they are still placed on maps produced by the county.

- Pleasant Grove, located at 38°51′18″N 95°16′10″W
- Willow Springs, located at 38°49′07″N 95°17′52″W
- Worden, located at 38°46′56″N 95°20′05″W

== Transportation ==
=== Major highways ===
- U.S. Highway 56
- U.S. Highway 59

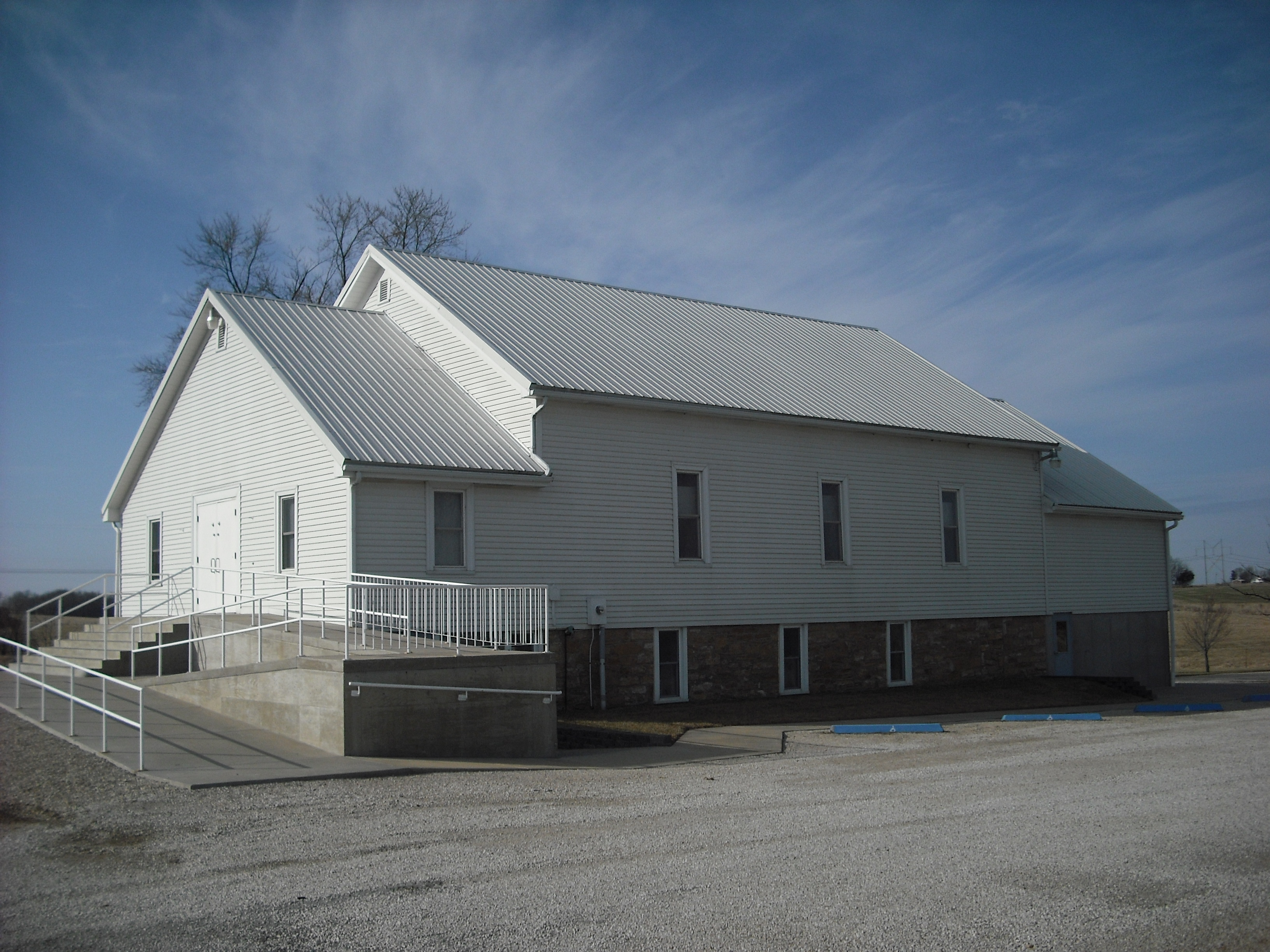
The Willow Springs Old German Baptist Brethren Church

=== Airports ===
Willow Springs Township contains one airport or landing strip, Flory Airport.

== Places of interest ==
- The Old German Baptist Brethren Church built in 1885. It is one of only 5 in Kansas and 56 in the country.
