= K-33 (Kansas highway) =

State highway in Kansas, U.S.

K-33
- K-33 in red

Route information
- Maintained by KDOT
- Length: 10.405 mi (16.745 km)
- Existed: 1926–present

Major junctions
- South end: K-68 east of Ottawa
- I-35 / US-50 in Wellsville
- North end: US-56 east of Baldwin City

Location
- Country: United States
- State: Kansas
- Counties: Franklin, Douglas

Highway system
- Kansas State Highway System; Interstate; US; State; Spurs
← K-32	→ K-34

K-33 is an approximately 10.4-mile-long (16.7 km) north–south state highway in the U.S. state of Kansas. K-33's southern terminus is at K-68 in rural Franklin County east of Ottawa and the northern terminus is at U.S. Route 56 (US-56) in Douglas County, east of Baldwin City and southwest of Kansas City. K-33 provides an important link between US-56 and K-68 to Interstate 35 (I-35) and US-50 in Wellsville. K-33 is a two-lane rural highway for most of its length, except for the section within Wellsville.

Before state highways were numbered in Kansas, there were auto trails. The majority of K-33's route closely follows the former New Santa Fe Trail, King of Trails and Ozark Trail. K-33 was first designated as a state highway in 1926. At this point the highway began near Waverly and ran northeastward to Ottawa, then east to the Missouri border. By the next year, K-33 had been realigned to turn north, just west of Ottawa, then passing through Wellsville to Edgerton. In 1934, the northern terminus of K-33 had been realigned to the west of Edgerton. Two years later, K-33's southern terminus had been truncated to Ottawa. In 1969, the overlap with K-68 had been eliminated and K-33 was truncated to its current southern terminus.

== Route description ==
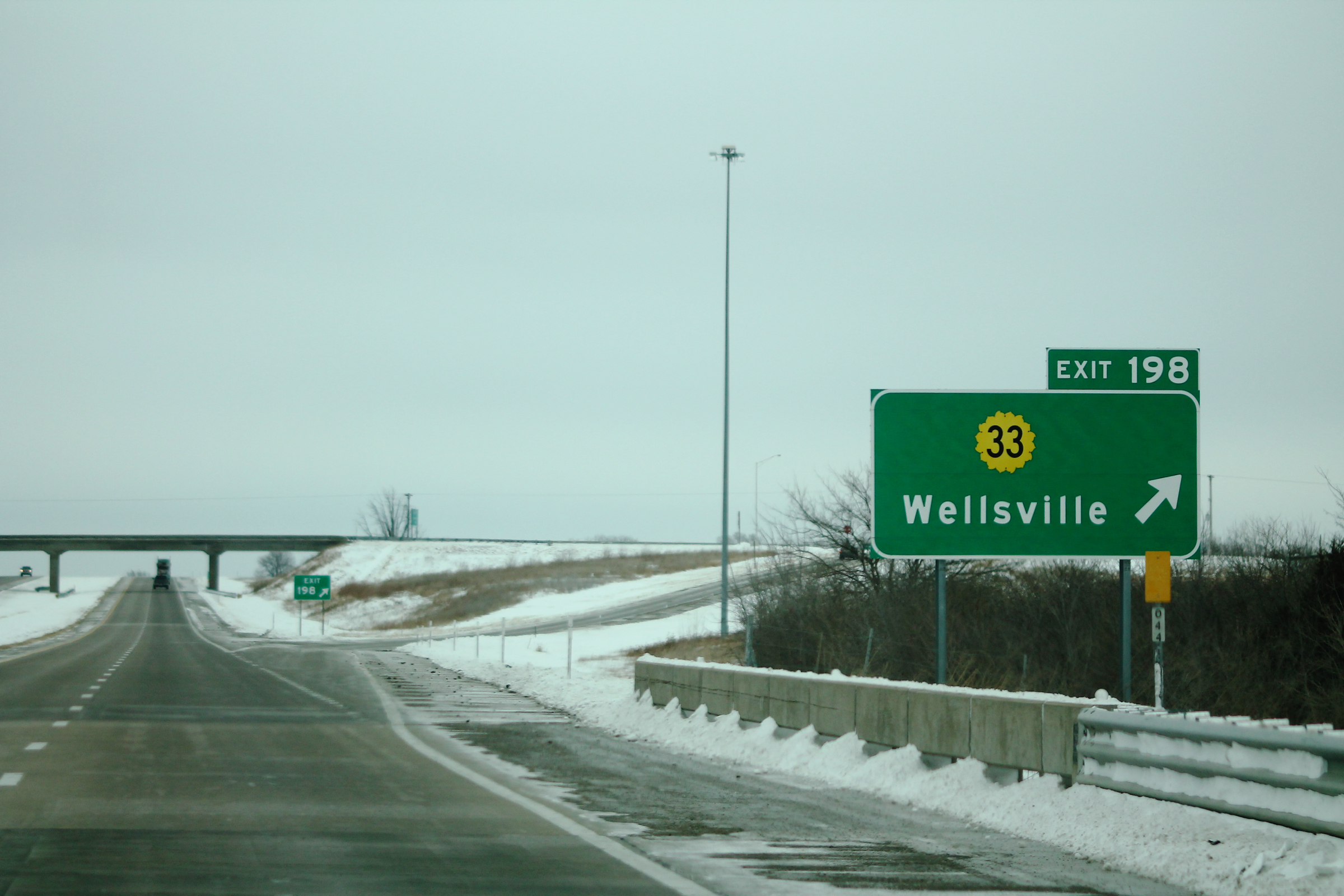
I-35 exit for K-33

K-33's southern terminus is at an intersection with K-68 east of Ottawa in Franklin County. It starts travelling north on a two-lane road through rolling plains to a crossing over Hickory Creek. K-33 continues north to Virginia Road, then curves to the east. The highway soon curves back north at Riley Road. The highway continues north to a diamond interchange with I-35 and US-50 at exit 198. North of this interchange, K-33 enters the city of Wellsville at Poplar Street. It continues north through the city and soon crosses over a BNSF Railway track. Continuing north, K-33 leaves the city at 1st Street. The highway soon crosses an unnamed tributary of Rock Creek, then enters Douglas County. It continues through a mix of farmland and scattered areas of trees to its northern terminus at US-56 east of Baldwin City.

The Kansas Department of Transportation (KDOT) tracks the traffic levels on its highways. Along K-33 in 2019, KDOT determined that on average, the traffic varied from 1,570 vehicles per day near the southern terminus to 5,130 vehicles per day between I-35/US-50 and Wellsville. The second highest average was 2,610 vehicles per day at the section slightly south of I-35 and US-50. K-33 connects to the National Highway System at I-35 and US-50 as well as at its northern terminus. (Note: The National Highway System is a system of highways important to the nation's defense, economy, and mobility.)

== History ==
=== Early roads ===
Prior to the formation of the Kansas state highway system, there were auto trails, which were an informal network of marked routes that existed in the United States and Canada in the early part of the 20th century. The majority of K-33's route closely follows the former New Santa Fe Trail which ran from Kansas City to the Los Angeles area; the King of Trails, which ran from Galveston and San Antonio north to Winnipeg; and the Ozark Trail.

=== Designation and realignments ===
K-33 was first designated a state highway in 1926 by the Kansas State Highway Commission (SHC), and at that time ran from US-75 and US-250 by Waverly northeastward to Ottawa then east to the Missouri border. By 1927, US-250 had been renumbered US-50S, and K-33 was realigned to travel north to Wellsville, then northeastward to US-50 in Edgerton. The year after, K-33 was realigned to intersect K-31 east of Waverly then follow the latter west to US-50S. In 1934, US-50S was realigned to follow K-33 from west of Waverly to Ottawa, and K-68 was extended west on the old US-50S alignment from Ottawa to US-75 by Lyndon. Also at this time, the northern terminus of K-33 was realigned to end at US-50 west of Edgerton. By 1936, K-33 was truncated to end at US-50S and US-73 in Ottawa. On June 27, 1956, the American Association of State Highway and Transportation Officials (AASHO) Route Numbering Committee approved US-56 to be created. US-56 was routed over US-50 from Kansas City westward to US-59 then followed US-50N, which was eliminated. At the same time US-50S was renumbered to US-50.

In August 1956, the SHC filed a land condemnation suit in court for improvements to be made to K-33 by Wellsville. The proposed project was for widening the highway from southwest of Wellsville north to the Franklin County line and replacing the obsolete wooden bridge over the Santa Fe railroad tracks with a concrete structure. The next month, a hearing was conducted in Wellsville about the project. On January 2, 1957, K-33 was closed south of Wellsville to begin construction of the overpass over the railroad tracks. In March 1957, work began on installing the bridge footings for the overpass. By August, all concrete work was complete on the overpass, with only grading on each end of the bridge needed to be done. During construction on the new bridge and grading, traffic was detoured along Main Street in Wellsville.

In a resolution on February 27, 1957, a new alignment of US-50 was approved between Ottawa and Olathe. The project was also to be part of the newly established Interstate Highway System and was estimated to cost $17 million. By December, the SHC accepted bids to pave the new section of highway. The new 14-mile-long (23 km) section of highway was opened in December 1958, with a ribbon cutting ceremony. At this time the northern terminus became solely US-56. In 1969, the overlap with K-68 was eliminated and K-33 was truncated to its current southern terminus.

== Major intersections ==
County	Location	mi	km	Destinations	Notes
Franklin	Peoria Township	0.000	0.000	K-68 to US-169 – Ottawa	Southern terminus; road continues as Virginia Road
Franklin	Franklin Township	6.044	9.727	I-35 / US-50 – Wichita, Kansas City	Diamond interchange; I-35 exit 198
Douglas	Palmyra Township	10.405	16.745	US-56 (North 200 Road) – Baldwin City, Olathe	Northern terminus; road continues as E 2300 Road
1.000 mi = 1.609 km; 1.000 km = 0.621 mi
