= Cutler Township, Kansas =

Cutler Township
- Township
- Location in Franklin County
- Coordinates: 38°31′15″N 095°07′11″W
- Country: United States
- State: Kansas
- County: Franklin

Area
  - Total: 43.01 sq mi (111.39 km^{2})
  - Land: 42.71 sq mi (110.63 km^{2})
  - Water: 0.29 sq mi (0.76 km^{2}) 0.68%
- Elevation: 1,060 ft (323 m)

Population (2020)
  - Total: 748
  - Density: 17.5/sq mi (6.76/km^{2})
- GNIS feature ID: 0479687

Cutler Township is a township in Franklin County, Kansas, United States. As of the 2020 census, its population was 748.

== Geography ==
Cutler Township covers an area of 43.01 square miles (111.4 km^{2}) and contains one incorporated settlement, Rantoul.

The streams of East Branch Mosquito Creek and West Branch Mosquito Creek run through this township.

== Transportation ==
Cutler Township contains one airport or landing strip, Dempsay Farm Airport.
