= Ohio City =

Ohio City may refer to:

- Ohio City, Ohio, a village in Van Wert County
- Ohio City, Cleveland, a neighborhood of Cleveland, Ohio
- Ohio City, Colorado, an unincorporated town in Gunnison County
- Ohio City, Kansas, a ghost town
