= Silkville, Kansas =

Ghost town in Franklin County, Kansas

- Silkville
- U.S. National Register of Historic Places
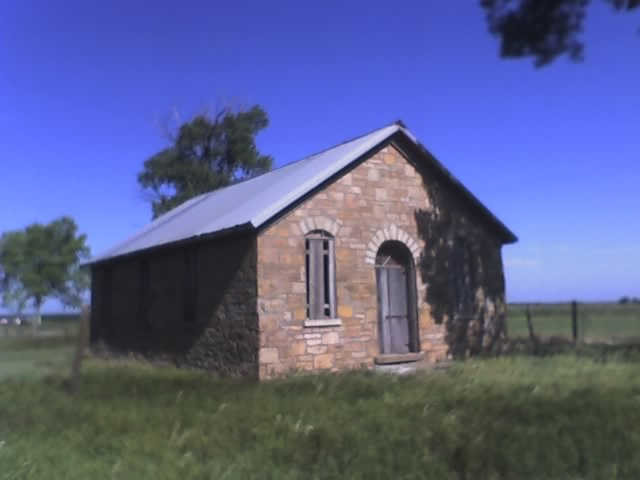
- Silkville's school house

- Location within Kansas
- Location: Williamsburg Township, Franklin County, Kansas
- Nearest city: Williamsburg, Kansas
- Coordinates: 38°27′00″N 95°29′21″W
- Area: 6 acres (2.4 ha)
- Built: 1870
- NRHP reference No.: 72000504
- Added to NRHP: December 15, 1972

Silkville is a ghost town in Williamsburg Township, Franklin County, Kansas, United States. It was located approximately two miles southwest of Williamsburg at the intersection of U.S. 50 highway and Arkansas Road.

The settlement was founded in the late 1800s by a Frenchman named Ernest de Boissière, who believed in Fourierian utopian socialism. Silkville was a sericulture-based settlement, and remuneration was based what each settler could produce. Silkville's silk was praised at the Centennial Exposition in Philadelphia in 1876, but loss of settlers and difficulty in selling the silk resulted in the settlement's collapse. Only a few buildings remain.

== History ==
Silkville was established in 1870 by a Frenchman named Ernest de Boissière, who was born in 1810 to an ancient French aristocratic family. Boissière espoused radical political opinions inspired by the utopian socialist philosophy of Charles Fourier. This put him in danger with Napoleon III, who came into power in 1851 and named himself emperor of the Second French Empire. Soon thereafter, Boissière was forced into exile and moved to America, where he first settled in the port city of New Orleans. In this new city, he set up a shipping line. However, because he poured some of his money into supporting orphaned black children, he garnered heavy criticism from wealthy whites; desiring to escape the hostile opinions of his neighbors, Boissière was left with no choice but to leave the American South. He then decided to move to Franklin County, Kansas, an area he believed was well-suited for establishing a utopic community. In 1869, Boissière purchased between 3000 and 3500 acres of land in the county from the Kansas Educational Association of the Methodist Episcopal Church and went about setting up his intentional settlement.

An 1884 photograph, showing students and teachers gathered at the Silkville school house.

After operating under myriad names, including Kansas Cooperative Farm, Prairie Home, and Valeton, Boissière's colony came to be known as Silkville, as it was intended to be a Fourierian commune that survived via silk production. The first building that Boissière constructed was a massive abode that others in the area referred to simply as the "Chateau". For a time the largest manor in the state, this house boasted sixty-rooms that could comfortably hold between 50–100 people. The building was also home to a huge library filled with 2,500 books, tomes, and other volumes. Boissière also erected a stone cocoonery and planted thousands of mulberry trees to feed his silkworms. These groves were later joined by hundreds of peach, apple and ailanthus trees, as well as over a thousand grape vines. To educate the children of the colony, Boissière established a school that, according to author and historian Daniel Fitzgerald, was "the first in Kansas in which the instructors attempted to teach the contemporary world literature of the day".

Boissière structured his colony so that remuneration was based on what each settler could produce, thereby rewarding the efficient labor of assiduous workers. Upon its founding, 40 French emigrants settled at the colony, each paying 100 dollars to be a part of the commune. In 1875, Charles Sears, a friend of Boissière's, moved to Silkville, and his arrival was a boon for the settlement's sericulture. The following year, Boissière's silk was lauded at the Centennial Exposition in Philadelphia. Despite this critical reception, Silkville struggled to make money, largely because it was competing with comparatively cheaper fabrics imported from Asia, and because Boissière refused to use cost-effective American dyes. Over the years, many members left. (Most, when they had arrived in America, spoke only French but soon learned English and began to assimilate into mainstream society.) Many immigrants also learned that for 100 dollars—the amount that they had pledged to live in the settlement—they could have bought their own land. To compensate, Boissière shifted production towards butter, cheese, and the raising of livestock. While this kept the settlement afloat for a few years, Silkville eventually collapsed and its members dispersed. Boissière returned to France in 1892, dying two years later, and his property was given to the Independent Order of Odd Fellows for use as an orphanage. Financial reasons compelled the Order to give up the property, and after a long court battle, it passed into the hands of lawyers from Topeka. In 1916, a fire hollowed out the "Chateau," only part of which was ever reconstructed.

=== Remains ===
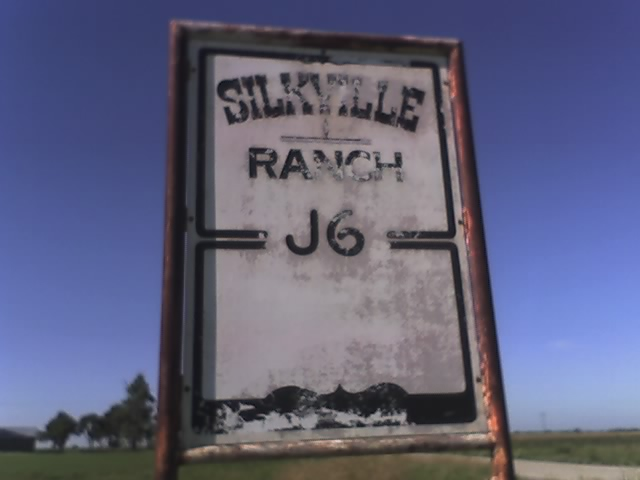
Today, the Silkville Ranch exists upon the former settlement.

Today, little remains of Silkville, and only three stone structures survive: the settlement's school house, and two barns. The original chateau that Boissiere constructed—which, at the time of its construction cost US$10,000—was destroyed in the aforementioned fire, and a modern home was built over the west end of the ruin, utilizing some of the stone from the original. One of the modern day barns was once the settlement's cocoonery, although it was reduced to a one-level building after a tornado damaged the top floor. In 1972, these buildings were added to the National Register of Historic Places because of their significance in the history of Kansas. The aspects of the community seen as most significant historically were its nature as an intentional community and its practice of sericulture.

== Geography ==
Its elevation is 1,161 feet (354 m), and it is located at 38°27′0″N 95°29′21″W (38.4500149, -95.4891477).

== See also ==
- List of Fourierist Associations in the United States
- List of ghost towns in Kansas

== Bibliography ==
- Fitzgerald, Daniel (1988). "Silkville". Ghost Towns of Kansas. University Press of Kansas. pp. 67–70. ISBN 9780700603688.
- Kansas Atlas & Gazetteer. Yarmouth: DeLorme. 2009. ISBN 9780899333427.
- Pankratz, Richard (May 15, 1972). "National Register of Historic Places Inventory/Nomination: Silkville" (PDF). National Park Service.
- Tollefson, Julie (Spring 2015). "The Failed Silk Revolution". Lawrence Magazine. Sunflower Publishing.
