= Pomona Township =

Pomona Township may refer to the following townships in the United States:

- Pomona Township, Jackson County, Illinois
- Pomona Township, Franklin County, Kansas
