= LeLoup, Kansas =

Unincorporated community in Franklin County, Kansas

- Unincorporated community
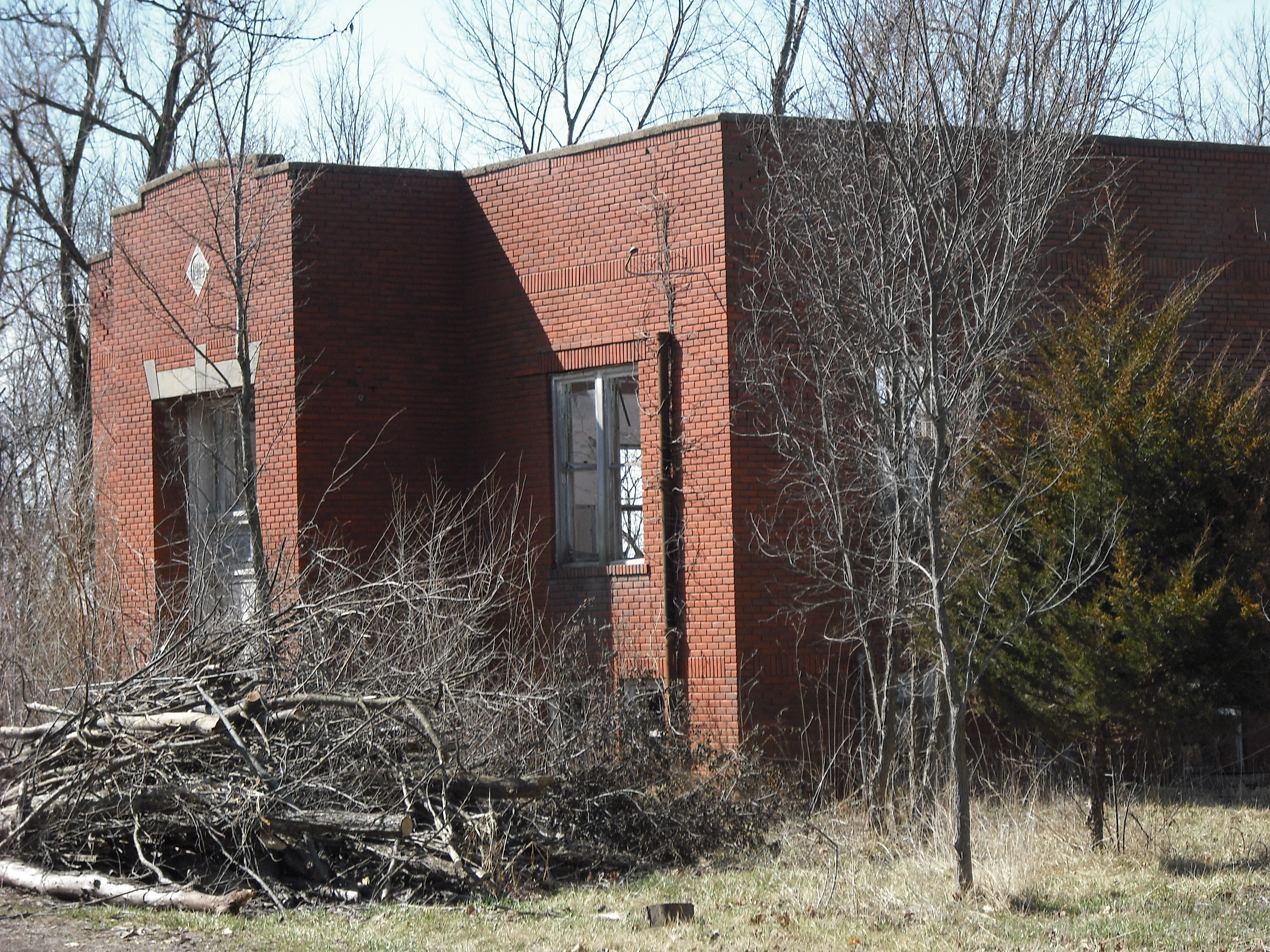
- Former school in LeLoup (2008)

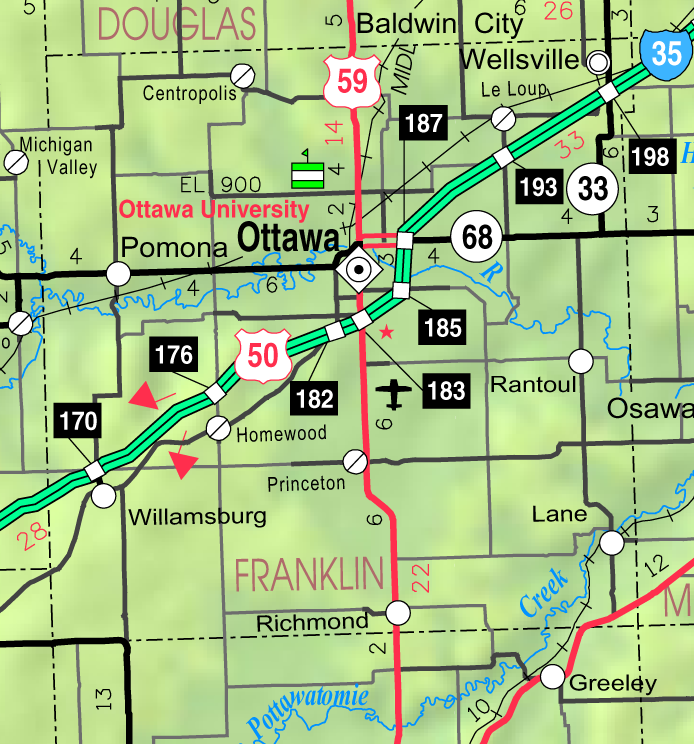
- KDOT map of Franklin County (legend)

- Location within Kansas Location within the United States
- Coordinates: 38°41′40.03″N 95°9′35.89″W
- Country: United States
- State: Kansas
- County: Franklin
- Founded: 1870
- Named for: Wolf
- Elevation: 955 ft (291 m)
- Time zone: UTC-6 (CST)
  - Summer (DST): UTC-5 (CDT)
- Area code: 785
- FIPS code: 20-39300
- GNIS ID: 479371

LeLoup is an unincorporated community in Franklin County, Kansas, United States. It is located one and one-half miles north of Interstate 35 on Tennessee Road, 11 miles northeast of Ottawa and seven miles southwest of Wellsville.

== History ==
LeLoup was founded in 1870 after the Santa Fe Railroad laid tracks through the area. The community was originally named Ferguson after Robert Ferguson, the original owner of the town site. The community was renamed LeLoup after a French traveler got off at Ferguson and mistook a coyote for a wolf and began shouting "le loup", then the community voted to change the name to LeLoup.

LeLoup had a post office from September 1870 until 1954; the name of the post office was changed from Ferguson in 1879.
