= Ransomville, Kansas =

Unincorporated community in Franklin County, Kansas

Coordinates: 38°30′23″N 95°25′33″W

Ransomville is an unincorporated community in Franklin County, Kansas, United States. It is located approximately two miles northeast of Williamsburg at the intersection of U.S. 50 highway and Hamilton Road.

== History ==
Ransomville was named for J. H. Ransom, who founded the first store around which the town was built up.

A post office was opened in Ransomville in 1881, and remained in operation until it was discontinued in 1915.
