= Franklin County, Kansas =

County in Kansas, United States

- County
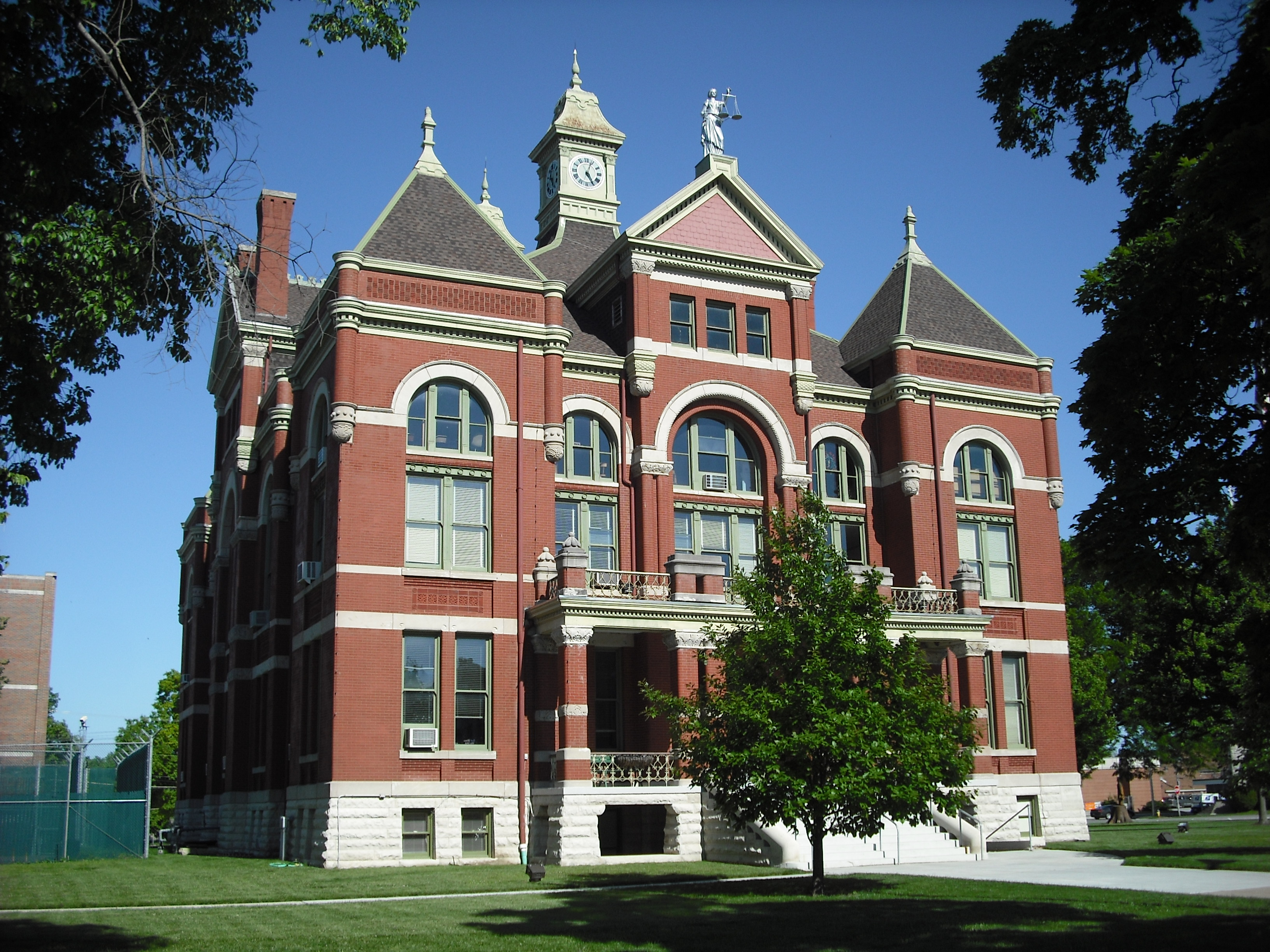
- Franklin County Courthouse in Ottawa (2009)

- Location within the U.S. state of Kansas
- Coordinates: 38°35′00″N 95°17′00″W
- Country: United States
- State: Kansas
- Founded: August 25, 1855
- Named for: Benjamin Franklin
- Seat: Ottawa
- Largest city: Ottawa

Area
  - Total: 577 sq mi (1,490 km^{2})
  - Land: 572 sq mi (1,480 km^{2})
  - Water: 5.4 sq mi (14 km^{2}) 0.9%

Population (2020)
  - Total: 25,996
  - Estimate (2025): 26,299 ▲
  - Density: 45.4/sq mi (17.5/km^{2})
- Time zone: UTC−6 (Central)
  - Summer (DST): UTC−5 (CDT)
- ZIP Codes: 66042, 66067, 66076, 66078, 66079, 66080, 66092, 66095
- Area code: 785
- Congressional district: 3rd
- Website: FranklinCoKS.org

Franklin County is a county located in the eastern portion of the U.S. state of Kansas. Its county seat and most populous city is Ottawa. As of the 2020 census, the county population was 25,996. The county was named for Benjamin Franklin, a founding father of the United States. Formerly it was considered part of the Kansas City metropolitan area, but was removed in 2013.

== History ==
=== Early history ===
For many millennia, the Great Plains of North America was inhabited by nomadic Native Americans. From the 16th century to 18th century, the Kingdom of France claimed ownership of large parts of North America. In 1762, after the French and Indian War, France secretly ceded New France to Spain, per the Treaty of Fontainebleau.

=== 19th century ===
In 1802, Spain returned most of the land to France, but keeping title to about 7,500 square miles. In 1803, most of the land for modern day Kansas was acquired by the United States from France as part of the 828,000 square mile Louisiana Purchase for 2.83 cents per acre.

The area was included in a treaty ceding land to the Osage Nation in 1808, and ceded back to the federal government in 1825. After 1825 and prior to 1867, treaties with various Indian nations set off parts of what was later to become Franklin County for the use of Indian tribes removed from their ancestral lands. These tribes included: Ottawa, Chippewa, Sac and Fox, Peoria, and Potawatomi.

In 1854, the Kansas Territory was organized under the provisions of the Kansas-Nebraska Act. In 1855, Franklin County was established as one of the 33 original Kansas Territory counties created by the first Territorial Legislature of 1855. The county was named after Benjamin Franklin. In 1861, Kansas became the 34th U.S. state.

== Geography ==
According to the U.S. Census Bureau, the county has a total area of 577 square miles (1,490 km^{2}), of which 572 square miles (1,480 km^{2}) is land and 5.4 square miles (14 km^{2}) (0.9%) is water.

=== Adjacent counties ===
- Douglas County (north)
- Johnson County (northeast)
- Miami County (east)
- Linn County (southeast)
- Anderson County (south)
- Coffey County (southwest)
- Osage County (west)

== Demographics ==
Historical population
Census	Pop.	Note	%±
1860	3,030		—
1870	10,385		242.7%
1880	16,797		61.7%
1890	20,279		20.7%
1900	21,354		5.3%
1910	20,884		−2.2%
1920	21,946		5.1%
1930	22,024		0.4%
1940	20,889		−5.2%
1950	19,928		−4.6%
1960	19,548		−1.9%
1970	20,007		2.3%
1980	22,062		10.3%
1990	21,994		−0.3%
2000	24,784		12.7%
2010	25,992		4.9%
2020	25,996		0.0%
2025 (est.)	26,299	▲	1.2%
U.S. Decennial Census; 1790–1960 1900–1990; 1990–2000 2010-2020

Franklin County comprises the Ottawa, KS Micropolitan Statistical Area, which is included in the Kansas City-Overland Park-Kansas City, MO-KS Combined Statistical Area.

=== 2020 census ===
As of the 2020 census, the county had a population of 25,996. The median age was 40.2 years, with 23.3% of residents under the age of 18 and 18.1% aged 65 years or older.

For every 100 females there were 99.7 males, and for every 100 females age 18 and over there were 98.8 males age 18 and over. 47.9% of residents lived in urban areas, while 52.1% lived in rural areas.

The racial makeup of the county was 89.2% White, 1.2% Black or African American, 0.8% American Indian and Alaska Native, 0.4% Asian, 0.0% Native Hawaiian and Pacific Islander, 1.5% from some other race, and 6.9% from two or more races. Hispanic or Latino residents of any race comprised 4.4% of the population.

There were 10,233 households in the county, of which 30.3% had children under the age of 18 living with them and 23.4% had a female householder with no spouse or partner present. About 26.8% of all households were made up of individuals and 12.2% had someone living alone who was 65 years of age or older.

There were 11,149 housing units, of which 8.2% were vacant. Among occupied housing units, 69.7% were owner-occupied and 30.3% were renter-occupied. The homeowner vacancy rate was 2.0% and the rental vacancy rate was 6.4%.

=== 2000 census ===
As of the U.S. Census in 2000, there were 24,784 people, 9,452 households, and 6,720 families residing in the county. The population density was 43 people per square mile (17 people/km^{2}). There were 10,229 housing units at an average density of 18 per square mile (6.9/km^{2}). The racial makeup of the county was 95.05% White, 1.21% Black or African American, 0.94% Native American, 0.31% Asian, 0.78% from other races, and 1.71% from two or more races. Hispanic or Latino of any race were 2.62% of the population.

There were 9,452 households, out of which 34.70% had children under the age of 18 living with them, 58.10% were married couples living together, 8.90% had a female householder with no husband present, and 28.90% were non-families. 24.80% of all households were made up of individuals, and 11.30% had someone living alone who was 65 years of age or older. The average household size was 2.56 and the average family size was 3.04.

In the county, the population was spread out, with 27.50% under the age of 18, 8.90% from 18 to 24, 28.30% from 25 to 44, 21.20% from 45 to 64, and 14.00% who were 65 years of age or older. The median age was 36 years. For every 100 females there were 98.30 males. For every 100 females age 18 and over, there were 94.10 males.

The median income for a household in the county was $39,052, and the median income for a family was $45,197. Males had a median income of $31,223 versus $22,992 for females. The per capita income for the county was $17,311. About 5.60% of families and 7.70% of the population were below the poverty line, including 8.40% of those under age 18 and 7.30% of those age 65 or over.

== Government and politics ==
Presidential election results

United States presidential election results for Franklin County, Kansas
Year	Republican		Democratic		Third party(ies)	
Year	No.	%	No.	%	No.	%
1888	2,422	50.47%	1,113	23.19%	1,264	26.34%
1892	2,209	46.06%	0	0.00%	2,587	53.94%
1896	2,609	44.91%	3,152	54.25%	49	0.84%
1900	2,872	51.55%	2,605	46.76%	94	1.69%
1904	2,855	62.84%	1,310	28.84%	378	8.32%
1908	2,658	52.74%	2,155	42.76%	227	4.50%
1912	672	13.75%	1,970	40.29%	2,247	45.96%
1916	3,885	45.17%	4,128	47.99%	588	6.84%
1920	5,216	65.16%	2,606	32.55%	183	2.29%
1924	6,008	67.05%	2,324	25.94%	628	7.01%
1928	7,346	78.40%	1,951	20.82%	73	0.78%
1932	4,887	50.16%	4,690	48.14%	165	1.69%
1936	6,007	57.00%	4,503	42.73%	28	0.27%
1940	6,393	63.80%	3,542	35.35%	85	0.85%
1944	5,375	64.68%	2,880	34.66%	55	0.66%
1948	5,145	58.24%	3,467	39.25%	222	2.51%
1952	6,983	72.86%	2,532	26.42%	69	0.72%
1956	6,557	71.42%	2,591	28.22%	33	0.36%
1960	6,158	68.20%	2,824	31.28%	47	0.52%
1964	3,725	45.31%	4,410	53.64%	86	1.05%
1968	4,875	59.17%	2,524	30.63%	840	10.20%
1972	6,011	72.71%	2,056	24.87%	200	2.42%
1976	4,760	55.49%	3,607	42.05%	211	2.46%
1980	5,525	62.73%	2,726	30.95%	557	6.32%
1984	6,284	70.61%	2,523	28.35%	92	1.03%
1988	4,777	56.43%	3,592	42.43%	96	1.13%
1992	3,699	37.43%	2,968	30.03%	3,216	32.54%
1996	5,007	50.91%	3,552	36.12%	1,276	12.97%
2000	5,925	61.35%	3,321	34.39%	412	4.27%
2004	7,391	64.40%	3,921	34.17%	164	1.43%
2008	7,079	60.04%	4,433	37.60%	279	2.37%
2012	6,984	63.55%	3,694	33.61%	312	2.84%
2016	7,185	65.53%	2,892	26.37%	888	8.10%
2020	8,479	67.96%	3,690	29.57%	308	2.47%
2024	8,773	69.04%	3,676	28.93%	259	2.04%

Voter Registration by County as of June 2026
Party	Number of Voters	Percentage
Democratic	3,209	16.61%
Libertarian	244	0.01%
Republican	10,472	54.21%
Others	5,391	27.91%
Total	19,316	100%

=== Government ===
At the federal level, Franklin County is represented in the United States Senate by Jerry Moran and Roger Marshall, both Republicans. It is represented in the United States House of Representatives as part of Kansas's 2nd congressional district by Republican Derek Schmidt. At the state level, Franklin County is in the Kansas Senate's 12th district, represented by Republican Caryn Tyson. It is largely in the Kansas House of Representatives's 59th district, represented by Republican Rebecca Schmoe, with a small portion lying in the 5th district, represented by Republican Courtney Sappington. Judicially, Franklin County is within the 4th district court district. It also has a board of county commissioners and several elected county officials.

Office	Name	Party
Commissioner, District 1	Colton Waymire	Republican
Commissioner, District 2	Rod Harris	Republican
Commissioner, District 3	Sabrina Meador	Republican
Commissioner, District 4	Scott Hornbuckle	Republican
Commissioner, District 5	Donald Stottlemire	Republican

=== Politics ===
Historically a Free-Stater stronghold with unionist sympathies (Franklin County was the site of the infamous Pottawatomie massacre), Franklin County, like most of the state, voted strongly Republican throughout most of the 19th century. Suffering from severe drought and a national economic downturn in the late 19th century, the county began voting for populist candidates and was the home base of Peter Percival Elder, a Republican who later became a state house speaker under the Farmers' Alliance, which evolved into the Populist Party. Franklin County continued to deliver strong majorities to populist candidates until the 1920s, when it, like the rest of the state, shifted heavily towards the Republican Party. Since then, Franklin County has been a Republican stronghold, being one of few Kansas counties to never vote for Franklin D. Roosevelt in any of his four runs. Aside from 1964, when the county was won by Lyndon B. Johnson amidst a national landslide, the county has voted continuously for Republicans since 1920, and Republicans have improved their margins in every election since 2008.

== Transportation ==
=== Airport ===
The county contains one airport, Ottawa Municipal Airport. The airport is civilian use.

=== Major highways ===
- I-35
- US-50
- US-59
- K-33
- K-68

== Education ==
=== Unified school districts ===
School districts include:

- West Franklin USD 287
- Central Heights USD 288
- Wellsville USD 289
- Ottawa USD 290
- Baldwin City USD 348
- Garnett USD 365
- Marais des Cygnes Valley USD 456
- Santa Fe Trail USD 434
- Paola USD 368
- Lebo-Waverly USD 243

=== Colleges and universities ===
- Ottawa University, Ottawa
- Neosho County Community College (branch campus), Ottawa

== Communities ==
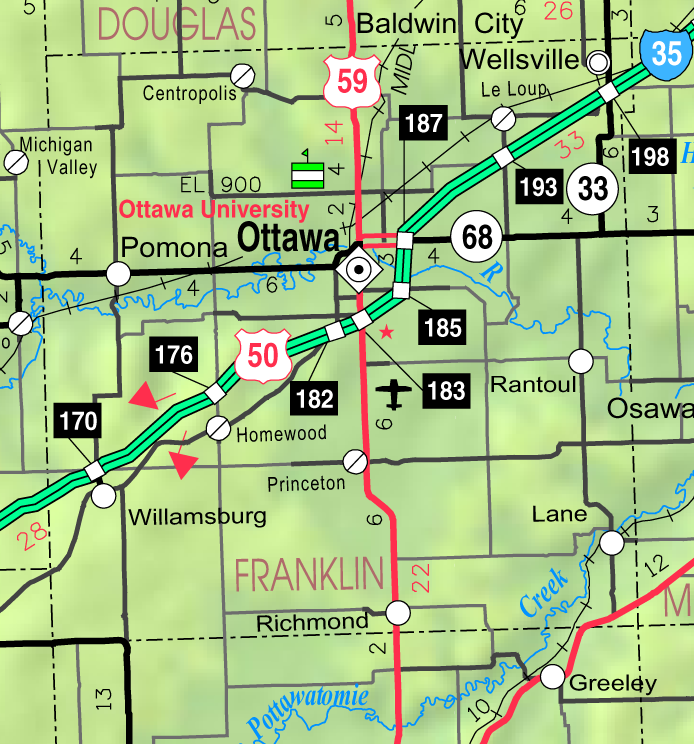
2005 map of Franklin County (map legend)

List of townships / incorporated cities / unincorporated communities / extinct former communities within Franklin County.

=== Cities ===
- Lane
- Ottawa (county seat)
- Pomona
- Princeton
- Rantoul
- Richmond
- Wellsville
- Williamsburg

=== Unincorporated places ===
† means a community is designated a Census-Designated Place (CDP) by the United States Census Bureau.

- Centropolis†
- Homewood
- Imes
- LeLoup
- Peoria
- Ransomville
- Richter

=== Ghost towns ===
- Minneola
- Norwood
- Ohio City
- Shermansville
- Silkville

=== Townships ===
Franklin County is divided into sixteen townships. The city of Ottawa is considered governmentally independent and is excluded from the census figures for the townships. In the following table, the population center is the largest city (or cities) included in that township's population total, if it is of a significant size.

Township	FIPS	Population center	Population	Population density /km^{2} (/sq mi)	Land area km^{2} (sq mi)	Water area km^{2} (sq mi)	Water %	Geographic coordinates
Appanoose	02075		293	4 (10)	77 (30)	0 (0)	0.10%	38°41′57″N 95°27′17″W
Centropolis	12475		997	9 (25)	105 (41)	0 (0)	0.34%	38°41′7″N 95°21′29″W
Cutler	16900	Rantoul	856	8 (20)	111 (43)	1 (0)	0.68%	38°31′33″N 95°6′56″W
Franklin	24375	Wellsville	2,552	28 (72)	91 (35)	0 (0)	0.52%	38°42′34″N 95°5′38″W
Greenwood	28750		429	5 (14)	79 (30)	0 (0)	0.08%	38°33′39″N 95°26′35″W
Harrison	30300		445	6 (16)	71 (27)	1 (0)	0.84%	38°34′20″N 95°13′2″W
Hayes	30925		397	5 (13)	77 (30)	0 (0)	0.36%	38°42′17″N 95°13′51″W
Homewood	33000		493	6 (16)	78 (30)	0 (0)	0.26%	38°30′53″N 95°23′28″W
Lincoln	40700		797	10 (26)	78 (30)	0 (0)	0.31%	38°34′8″N 95°18′33″W
Ohio	52350	Princeton	783	7 (19)	108 (42)	1 (0)	1.05%	38°29′14″N 95°16′32″W
Ottawa	53575		868	8 (20)	111 (43)	0 (0)	0.33%	38°38′21″N 95°16′5″W
Peoria	55425		626	7 (18)	92 (36)	0 (0)	0.20%	38°36′32″N 95°7′45″W
Pomona	57025	Pomona	1,174	22 (56)	54 (21)	0 (0)	0.30%	38°36′40″N 95°27′24″W
Pottawatomie	57225	Lane	669	7 (17)	101 (39)	0 (0)	0.46%	38°26′14″N 95°6′32″W
Richmond	59700	Richmond	812	9 (23)	91 (35)	0 (0)	0.50%	38°24′19″N 95°15′22″W
Williamsburg	79325	Williamsburg	672	5 (12)	145 (56)	1 (1)	0.95%	38°27′33″N 95°27′43″W
Sources: "Census 2000 U.S. Gazetteer Files". U.S. Census Bureau, Geography Division. Archived from the original on August 2, 2002.

== Notable people ==
- Foster Dwight Coburn, Secretary of Agriculture, Kansas
- Steve Grogan, NFL quarterback, who grew up in Ottawa.
- Chely Wright, Singer
- James Still (playwright), writer, who grew up in Pomona
- Gary Hart, Democratic US Senator

== See also ==
- Flint Hills Trail
- National Register of Historic Places listings in Franklin County, Kansas

Community information for Kansas

- Kansas locations by per capita income
- List of counties in Kansas
- List of townships in Kansas
- List of cities in Kansas
- List of unincorporated communities in Kansas
- List of ghost towns in Kansas
