= Ohio City, Kansas =

- Ghost town
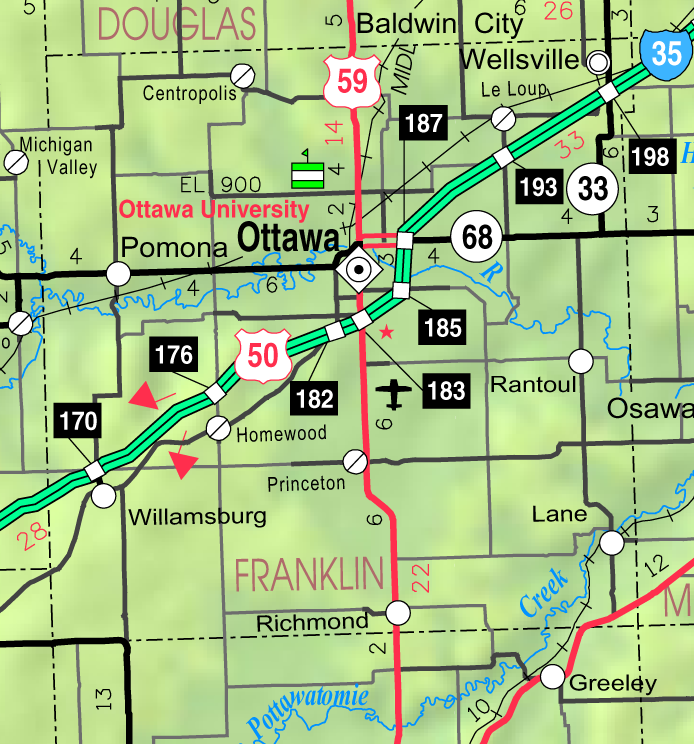
- KDOT map of Franklin County (legend)

- Location within Kansas Location within the United States
- Coordinates: 38°30′23″N 95°14′56″W
- Country: United States
- State: Kansas
- County: Franklin

Population
  - Total: 0
- Time zone: UTC-6 (CST)
  - Summer (DST): UTC-5 (CDT)

Ohio City is a ghost town in Franklin County, Kansas, United States.

Ohio City was issued a post office in 1857 but was discontinued and moved to Princeton in 1870. The town was one mile north and one mile east of where Princeton is currently located. In 1866, the town burnt to the ground, but everyone rebuilt it. It burnt to the ground a second time, then the town was moved to its current location and renamed Princeton. The last Ohio City remnants were removed in 1999. Now, there are no signs left that there was a town.
