= Lou McEvoy =

American baseball player (1902-1953)

- Pitcher
- Born: May 30, 1902; Williamsburg, Kansas, U.S.
- Died: December 17, 1953 (aged 51); Webster Groves, Missouri, U.S.
- Batted: Right Threw: Right

MLB debut
- April 28, 1930, for the New York Yankees

Last MLB appearance
- July 26, 1931, for the New York Yankees

MLB statistics
- Win–loss record: 1–3
- Earned run average: 7.79
- Strikeouts: 17
- Stats at Baseball Reference

Teams
- New York Yankees (1930–1931)

Louis Anthony McEvoy (May 30, 1902 – December 17, 1953) was an American Major League Baseball pitcher. McEvoy played for the New York Yankees in 1930 and 1931. In 34 career games, he had a 1–3 record, with a 7.79 ERA. He batted and threw right-handed.

McEvoy was born in Williamsburg, Kansas and died in Webster Groves, Missouri.
