= Peoria, Kansas =

Unincorporated community in Franklin County, Kansas

Coordinates: 38°35′05″N 95°08′56″W

Peoria is an unincorporated community in Franklin County, Kansas, United States.

== History ==
Peoria was founded in the late 1850s. it was named for the Peoria tribe, who once owned the town site.

A post office opened in Peoria in 1857, closed in 1859, reopened in 1860, and closed permanently in 1934.

In 1895, the estimated population for Peoria was 123.

== Geography ==
=== Climate ===
Peoria experiences a Cfa climate (Subtropical) climate.
