= Franklin Township, Franklin County, Kansas =

Franklin Township
- Township
- Location in Franklin County
- Coordinates: 38°41′30″N 095°06′01″W
- Country: United States
- State: Kansas
- County: Franklin
- Established: 1865

Area
  - Total: 35.48 sq mi (91.88 km^{2})
  - Land: 35.3 sq mi (91.4 km^{2})
  - Water: 0.19 sq mi (0.48 km^{2}) 0.52%
- Elevation: 1,001 ft (305 m)

Population (2020)
  - Total: 3,080
  - Density: 87.3/sq mi (33.7/km^{2})
- Zip Code: 66092
- Area code: 785
- GNIS feature ID: 0479378
- Website: Official Website

Franklin Township is a township in Franklin County, Kansas, United States. As of the 2020 census, its population was 3,080. It is the most populated township in Franklin County.

== Geography ==
Franklin Township covers an area of 35.47 square miles (91.9 km^{2}) and contains one incorporated settlement, Wellsville. According to the USGS, it contains one cemetery, Wellsville.

== Fire District ==
On November 6, 2012, voters approved the creation of the Wellsville Fire District which combined the Franklin Township Fire Department and the City of Wellsville Fire Department. The new fire district became fully operational on January 1, 2014. The fire district board consists of the three members of the Franklin Township Board of Trustees and one member appointed by the City of Wellsville.

== Transportation ==
Interstate 35 runs from the northeast to the southeast through Franklin Township. Kansas State Highway 33 runs north–south through Franklin Township. Franklin Township contains one airport or landing strip, Qualls-Hart Airport. A main line of the BNSF Railway runs through the middle of Franklin Township.
