= Richmond Township, Franklin County, Kansas =

Richmond Township
- Township
- Location in Franklin County
- Coordinates: 38°24′45″N 095°16′01″W
- Country: United States
- State: Kansas
- County: Franklin

Area
  - Total: 35.14 sq mi (91.01 km^{2})
  - Land: 34.96 sq mi (90.55 km^{2})
  - Water: 0.18 sq mi (0.46 km^{2}) 0.51%
- Elevation: 1,014 ft (309 m)

Population (2020)
  - Total: 829
  - Density: 23.7/sq mi (9.16/km^{2})
- GNIS feature ID: 0477588

Richmond Township is a township in Franklin County, Kansas, United States. As of the 2020 census, its population was 829.

== Geography ==
Richmond Township covers an area of 35.14 square miles (91.0 km^{2}) and contains one incorporated settlement, Richmond. According to the USGS, it contains one cemetery, Berea.
