= Homewood, Kansas =

Unincorporated community in Franklin County, Kansas

Coordinates: 38°30′53″N 95°22′44″W

Homewood (formerly Forest Home) is an unincorporated community in Homewood Township, Franklin County, Kansas, United States. In the 19th century it had a post office and a stop on the Atchison, Topeka, and Santa Fe Railway.

== History ==
Homewood was located on the Atchison, Topeka and Santa Fe Railway at altitude 1,039 feet (317 m) above sea level. In 1900, it contained a population of about 100 inhabitants. Around this time, a number of stores operated out of the community, and it also had its own school. It was the supply and shipping point for the surrounding rural area.

The Homewood post office located in the community in 1877 had been the Forest Home post office earlier that year. It closed in 1955.

== Sources ==
- Gannett, Henry (1898). "Homewood". A Gazetteer of Kansas. Bulletin. Vol. 154. United States Geological Survey.
- Blackmar, Frank Wilson (1912). Kansas: A Cyclopedia of State History, Embracing Events, Institutions, Industries, Counties, Cities, Towns, Prominent Persons, Etc. Standard Publishing Company. (Kansas: A Cyclopedia of State History at the Internet Archive)
- "Kansas Post Offices, 1828–1961". Kansas State Historical Society. Archived from the original on October 9, 2013.
- Rydjord, John (1972). Kansas place-names. University of Oklahoma Press. ISBN 978-0-8061-0994-7. (Kansas place-names at the Internet Archive)
