= Lincoln Township, Franklin County, Kansas =

Lincoln Township
- Township
- Location in Franklin County
- Coordinates: 38°34′20″N 095°18′46″W
- Country: United States
- State: Kansas
- County: Franklin

Area
  - Total: 30.34 sq mi (78.59 km^{2})
  - Land: 30.25 sq mi (78.35 km^{2})
  - Water: 0.093 sq mi (0.24 km^{2}) 0.31%
- Elevation: 938 ft (286 m)

Population (2020)
  - Total: 833
  - Density: 27.5/sq mi (10.6/km^{2})
- GNIS feature ID: 0479640

Lincoln Township is a township in Franklin County, Kansas, United States. As of the 2020 census, its population was 833.

== Geography ==
Lincoln Township covers an area of 30.34 square miles (78.6 km^{2}) and contains no incorporated settlements. According to the USGS, it contains two cemeteries: Chippewa Hills and Muncie.

The streams of Blue Creek, Harrison Branch, Mud Creek and Robinson Creek run through this township.

== Transportation ==
Lincoln Township contains two airports or landing strips: Camp Chippewa Airport and Lemaster Field.
