= Ohio Township, Franklin County, Kansas =

Ohio Township
- Township
- Location in Franklin County
- Coordinates: 38°28′40″N 095°17′41″W
- Country: United States
- State: Kansas
- County: Franklin

Area
  - Total: 42.04 sq mi (108.88 km^{2})
  - Land: 41.59 sq mi (107.73 km^{2})
  - Water: 0.44 sq mi (1.15 km^{2}) 1.06%
- Elevation: 938 ft (286 m)

Population (2020)
  - Total: 768
  - Density: 18.5/sq mi (7.13/km^{2})
- GNIS feature ID: 0479686

Ohio Township is a township in Franklin County, Kansas, United States. As of the 2020 census, its population was 768.

== Geography ==
Ohio Township covers an area of 42.04 square miles (108.9 km^{2}) and contains one incorporated settlement, Princeton.

The stream of Payne Creek runs through this township.

== Transportation ==
Ohio Township contains one airport or landing strip, Cochran Airport.
