= Harrison Township, Franklin County, Kansas =

Harrison Township
- Township
- Location in Franklin County
- Coordinates: 38°34′10″N 095°13′16″W
- Country: United States
- State: Kansas
- County: Franklin

Area
  - Total: 27.70 sq mi (71.74 km^{2})
  - Land: 27.46 sq mi (71.13 km^{2})
  - Water: 0.23 sq mi (0.6 km^{2}) 0.84%
- Elevation: 980 ft (300 m)

Population (2020)
  - Total: 460
  - Density: 17/sq mi (6.5/km^{2})
- GNIS feature ID: 0479679

Harrison Township is a township in Franklin County, Kansas, United States. As of the 2020 census, its population was 460.

== Geography ==
Harrison Township covers an area of 27.7 square miles (72 km^{2}) and contains no incorporated settlements. According to the USGS, it contains two cemeteries: Fouts and Roselawn.

The streams of Rock Creek and Sac Branch run through this township.

== Transportation ==
Harrison Township contains one airport or landing strip, Ottawa Municipal Airport.
