= Lane, Kansas =

City in Franklin County, Kansas

- City
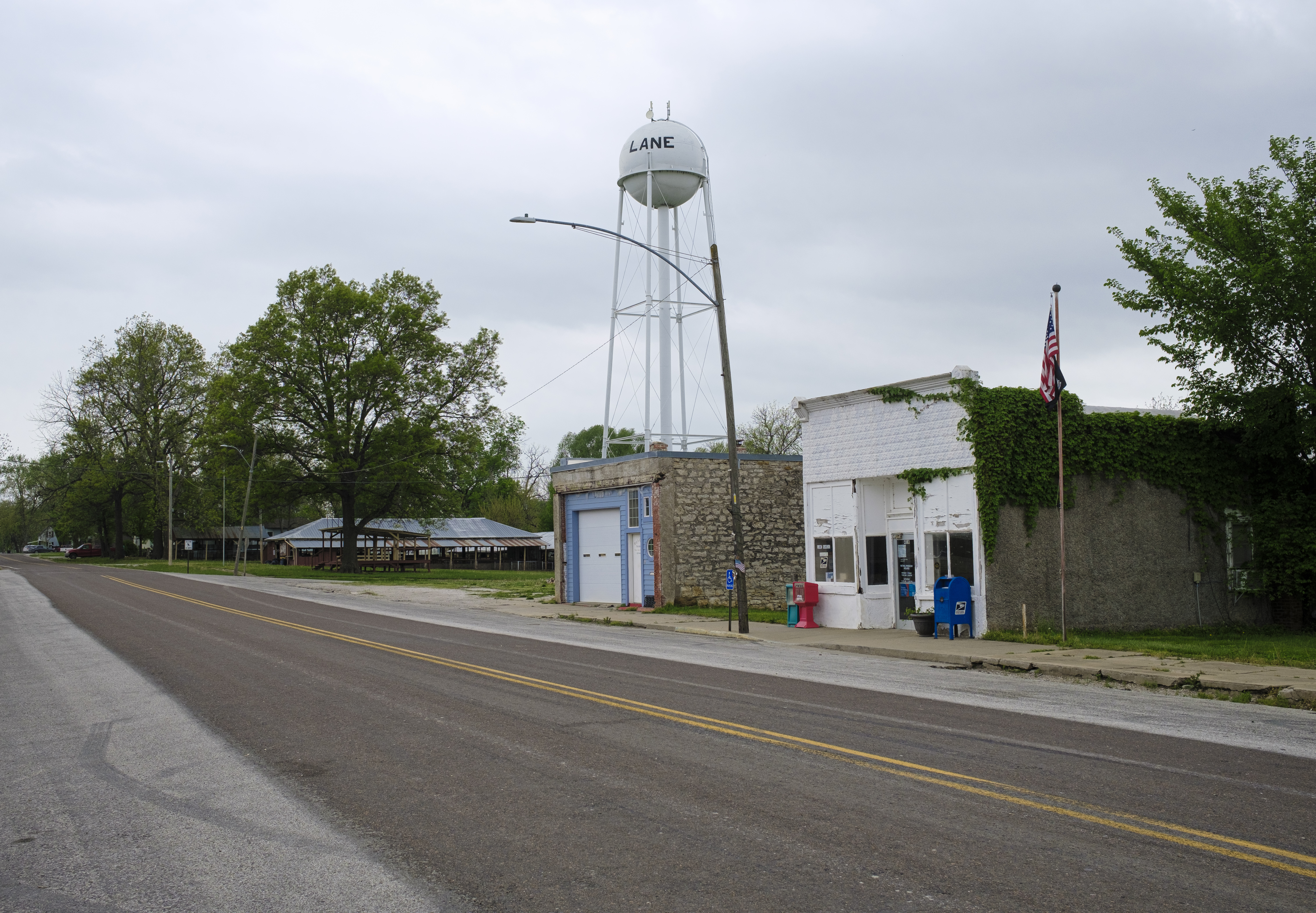
- Kansas Avenue (2022)

- Location within Franklin County and Kansas

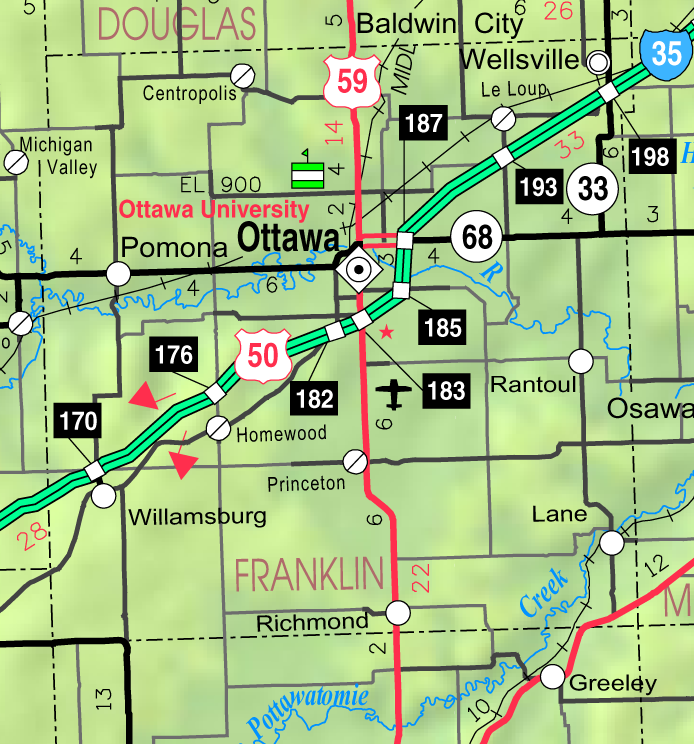
- KDOT map of Franklin County (legend)
- Coordinates: 38°26′23″N 95°04′55″W
- Country: United States
- State: Kansas
- County: Franklin
- Founded: 1855
- Incorporated: 1908
- Named for: James Lane

Area
  - Total: 0.24 sq mi (0.61 km^{2})
  - Land: 0.23 sq mi (0.59 km^{2})
  - Water: 0.0077 sq mi (0.02 km^{2})
- Elevation: 886 ft (270 m)

Population (2020)
  - Total: 241
  - Density: 1,100/sq mi (410/km^{2})
- Time zone: UTC-6 (CST)
  - Summer (DST): UTC-5 (CDT)
- ZIP Code: 66042
- Area code: 785
- FIPS code: 20-38400
- GNIS ID: 2395627
- Website: City info

Lane is a city in Franklin County, Kansas, United States. As of the 2020 census, the population of the city was 241.

== History ==
The first temporary settlement near what would become Lane occurred in 1838 when Rev. Robert Simerwell established a Baptist Mission Station "on the south side of Pottawatomie Creek" following the Potawatomie Trail of Death. When the Federal Government moved the Potawatomie (and the Baptist Mission) to the Kansas River valley in the mid-1840s, brothers William, Peter, and "Dutch" Henry Sherman were left as the first permanent settlers. The community was known as Dutch Henry's Crossing because a wagon road forded the creek near the Sherman cabin.

The area of Lane west of Kansas Avenue was originally laid out under the name Shermanville in 1855. It was renamed Lane in 1863 for James H. Lane, a leader of the Jayhawkers abolitionist movement, who served as one of the first Senators from Kansas.

When the Missouri Pacific Railroad arrived in 1879, a competing community, called either Emerson or Avondale, was laid out east of Kansas Avenue. Within two years the competition between the two towns ceased, and both townsites had merged into the single community of Lane. Lane was incorporated as a city in 1908.

Lane is near the site where in 1856, the abolitionist John Brown and four other of his followers hacked five pro-slavery men, one of whom was William Sherman, to death with broadswords near Mosquito Creek and Pottawatomie Creek. The event is commonly referred to as the Pottawatomie massacre.

== Geography ==
According to the United States Census Bureau, the city has a total area of 0.24 square miles (0.62 km^{2}), all land.

=== Climate ===
The climate in this area is characterized by hot, humid summers and generally mild to cool winters. According to the Köppen Climate Classification system, Lane has a humid subtropical climate, abbreviated "Cfa" on climate maps.

== Demographics ==
Historical population
Census	Pop.	Note	%±
1880	166		—
1910	272		—
1920	351		29.0%
1930	291		−17.1%
1940	234		−19.6%
1950	200		−14.5%
1960	282		41.0%
1970	254		−9.9%
1980	249		−2.0%
1990	247		−0.8%
2000	256		3.6%
2010	225		−12.1%
2020	241		7.1%
U.S. Decennial Census

=== 2020 census ===
The 2020 United States census counted 241 people, 100 households, and 64 families in Lane. The population density was 1,034.3 per square mile (399.4/km^{2}). There were 114 housing units at an average density of 489.3 per square mile (188.9/km^{2}). The racial makeup was 88.8% (214) white or European American (88.8% non-Hispanic white), 1.66% (4) black or African-American, 0.83% (2) Native American or Alaska Native, 0.41% (1) Asian, 0.0% (0) Pacific Islander or Native Hawaiian, 0.83% (2) from other races, and 7.47% (18) from two or more races. Hispanic or Latino of any race was 2.49% (6) of the population.

Of the 100 households, 37.0% had children under the age of 18; 43.0% were married couples living together; 19.0% had a female householder with no spouse or partner present. 28.0% of households consisted of individuals and 8.0% had someone living alone who was 65 years of age or older. The average household size was 2.1 and the average family size was 2.9. The percent of those with a bachelor's degree or higher was estimated to be 2.5% of the population.

20.7% of the population was under the age of 18, 8.3% from 18 to 24, 22.8% from 25 to 44, 27.8% from 45 to 64, and 20.3% who were 65 years of age or older. The median age was 44.1 years. For every 100 females, there were 79.9 males. For every 100 females ages 18 and older, there were 78.5 males.

The 2016–2020 5-year American Community Survey estimates show that the median household income was $30,938 (with a margin of error of +/- $9,165) and the median family income was $38,214 (+/- $19,838). Males had a median income of $31,875 (+/- $17,550) versus $24,375 (+/- $6,096) for females. The median income for those above 16 years old was $28,393 (+/- $3,429). Approximately, 24.1% of families and 14.3% of the population were below the poverty line, including 0.0% of those under the age of 18 and 29.9% of those ages 65 or over.

=== 2010 census ===
As of the census of 2010, there were 225 people, 102 households, and 61 families residing in the city. The population density was 937.5 inhabitants per square mile (362.0/km^{2}). There were 112 housing units at an average density of 466.7 per square mile (180.2/km^{2}). The racial makeup of the city was 98.2% White, 0.9% Asian, 0.4% from other races, and 0.4% from two or more races. Hispanic or Latino of any race were 1.8% of the population.

There were 102 households, of which 23.5% had children under the age of 18 living with them, 47.1% were married couples living together, 9.8% had a female householder with no husband present, 2.9% had a male householder with no wife present, and 40.2% were non-families. 27.5% of all households were made up of individuals, and 5.9% had someone living alone who was 65 years of age or older. The average household size was 2.21 and the average family size was 2.72.

The median age in the city was 45.1 years. 21.8% of residents were under the age of 18; 8.5% were between the ages of 18 and 24; 19.5% were from 25 to 44; 35.1% were from 45 to 64; and 15.1% were 65 years of age or older. The gender makeup of the city was 52.0% male and 48.0% female.

=== 2000 census ===
As of the census of 2000, there were 97 households, and 71 families residing in the city. The population density was 1,177.8 inhabitants per square mile (454.8/km^{2}). There were 105 housing units at an average density of 483.1 per square mile (186.5/km^{2}). The racial makeup of the city was 96.48% White, 0.39% Black or African American, 0.39% Native American, 0.39% Asian, and 2.34% from two or more races. Hispanic or Latino of any race were 0.39% of the population.

There were 97 households, out of which 33.0% had children under the age of 18 living with them, 57.7% were married couples living together, 11.3% had a female householder with no husband present, and 25.8% were non-families. 22.7% of all households were made up of individuals, and 7.2% had someone living alone who was 65 years of age or older. The average household size was 2.64 and the average family size was 2.99.

In the city, the population was spread out, with 26.2% under the age of 18, 10.5% from 18 to 24, 30.5% from 25 to 44, 20.3% from 45 to 64, and 12.5% who were 65 years of age or older. The median age was 35 years. For every 100 females, there were 103.2 males. For every 100 females age 18 and over, there were 110.0 males.

The median income for a household was $41,500, and the median income for a family was $42,500. Males had a median income of $32,031 versus $21,429 for females. The per capita income for the city was $19,144. About 11.4% of families and 12.0% of the population were below the poverty line, including 13.1% of those under the age of 18 and none of those 65 and older.

== Education ==
Lane is a part of Central Heights USD 288 school district, headquarters located in Richmond. School mascot is Central Heights Vikings.

Lane schools were closed through school unification in 1965. The Lane High School mascot was Lane Lions.
