= Pomona Township, Kansas =

Pomona Township
- Township
- Location in Franklin County
- Coordinates: 38°37′20″N 095°27′41″W
- Country: United States
- State: Kansas
- County: Franklin

Area
  - Total: 21.02 sq mi (54.45 km^{2})
  - Land: 20.96 sq mi (54.28 km^{2})
  - Water: 0.062 sq mi (0.16 km^{2}) 0.29%
- Elevation: 1,014 ft (309 m)

Population (2020)
  - Total: 1,128
  - Density: 53.82/sq mi (20.78/km^{2})
- GNIS feature ID: 0479328

Pomona Township is a township in Franklin County, Kansas, United States. As of the 2020 census, its population was 1,128.

== Geography ==
Pomona Township covers an area of 21.02 square miles (54.4 km^{2}) and contains one incorporated settlement, Pomona. According to the USGS, it contains one cemetery, Woodlawn.

The streams of Hard Fish Creek and Lost Creek run through this township.

== Notable people ==
- Foster Dwight Coburn, Secretary of Agriculture, Kansas
