= Imes, Kansas =

Unincorporated community in Franklin County, Kansas

Coordinates: 38°34′25″N 95°09′30″W

Imes is an unincorporated community in Franklin County, Kansas, United States. It is located southeast of Ottawa, approximately four miles south of K-68 on Tennessee Road.

== History ==
Imes had a post office from 1881 until 1917, but the post office was called Larimore until 1887.
