= Ottawa Township, Franklin County, Kansas =

Ottawa Township
- Township
- Location in Franklin County
- Coordinates: 38°38′30″N 095°17′01″W
- Country: United States
- State: Kansas
- County: Franklin

Area
  - Total: 43.04 sq mi (111.48 km^{2})
  - Land: 42.90 sq mi (111.11 km^{2})
  - Water: 0.14 sq mi (0.37 km^{2}) 0.33%
- Elevation: 902 ft (275 m)

Population (2020)
  - Total: 842
  - Density: 19.6/sq mi (7.58/km^{2})
- GNIS feature ID: 0479366

Ottawa Township is a township in Franklin County, Kansas, United States. As of the 2020 census, its population was 842.

== Geography ==
Ottawa Township covers an area of 43.04 square miles (111.5 km^{2}) and contains one incorporated settlement, Ottawa (the county seat). According to the USGS, it contains five cemeteries: Highland, Hope, Indian, Mount Calvary and Mount Evergreen.

The streams of Appanoose Creek, Eightmile Creek, Island Creek, Nugent Creek, Sand Creek, Spring Creek, Tauy Creek, Walnut Creek, Wilson Creek and Wolf Creek run through this township.
