= Richmond, Kansas =

City in Franklin County, Kansas

- City
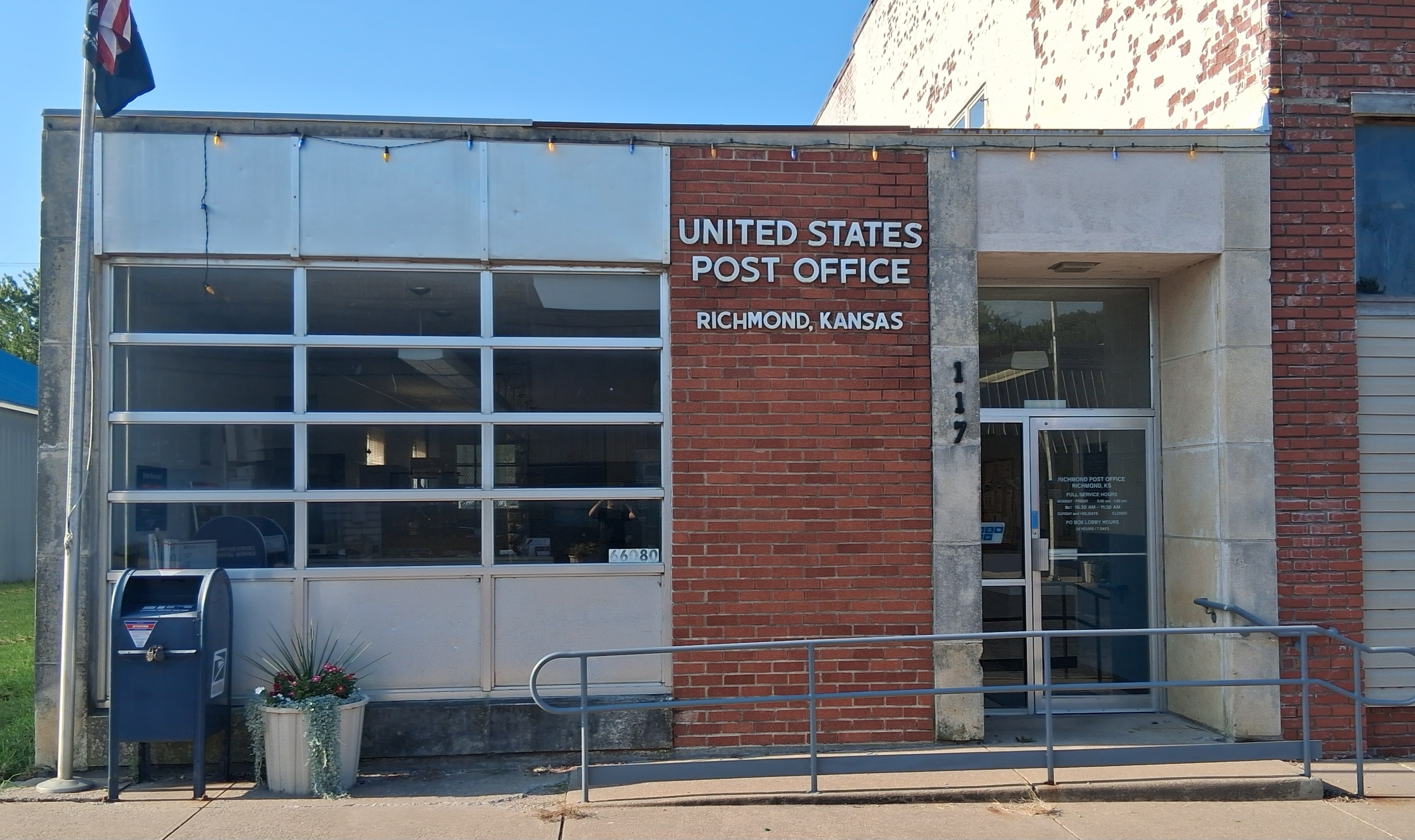
- Richmond's post office in 2026

- Location within Franklin County and Kansas

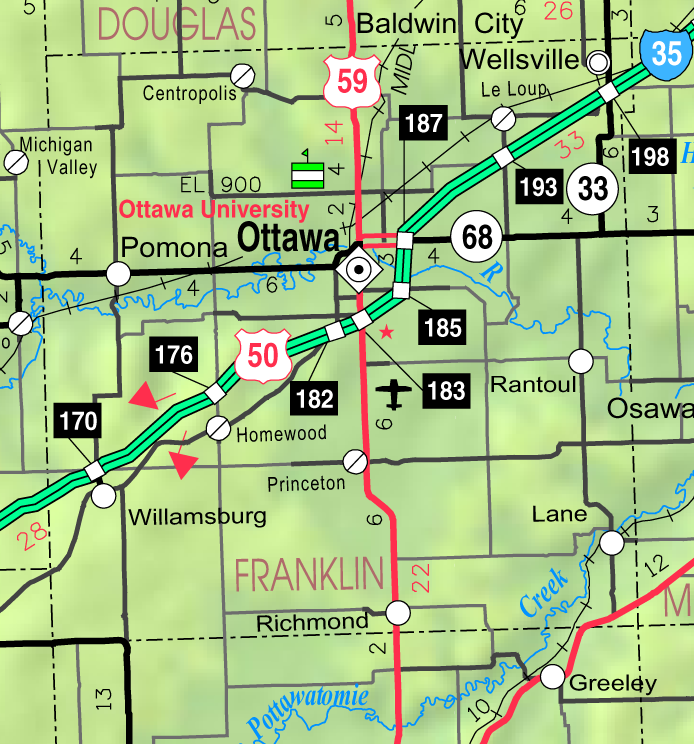
- KDOT map of Franklin County (legend)
- Coordinates: 38°24′01″N 95°15′07″W
- Country: United States
- State: Kansas
- County: Franklin
- Founded: 1870
- Incorporated: 1910
- Named for: John C. Richmond

Area
  - Total: 0.35 sq mi (0.90 km^{2})
  - Land: 0.35 sq mi (0.90 km^{2})
  - Water: 0 sq mi (0.00 km^{2})
- Elevation: 1,030 ft (310 m)

Population (2020)
  - Total: 459
  - Density: 1,300/sq mi (510/km^{2})
- Time zone: UTC-6 (CST)
  - Summer (DST): UTC-5 (CDT)
- ZIP Code: 66080
- Area code: 785
- FIPS code: 20-59675
- GNIS ID: 2396369
- Website: cityofrichmondks.org

Richmond is a city in Franklin County, Kansas, United States. As of the 2020 census, the population of the city was 459.

== History ==
Richmond was founded in 1870. It was named for John C. Richmond, a local farmer who donated forty acres of land to the railroad for a station location.

The first post office in Richmond was established in April 1870.

== Geography ==
According to the United States Census Bureau, the city has a total area of 0.30 square miles (0.78 km^{2}), all land.

== Demographics ==
Historical population
Census	Pop.	Note	%±
1880	50		—
1920	400		—
1930	411		2.8%
1940	418		1.7%
1950	433		3.6%
1960	352		−18.7%
1970	464		31.8%
1980	510		9.9%
1990	528		3.5%
2000	510		−3.4%
2010	464		−9.0%
2020	459		−1.1%
U.S. Decennial Census

=== 2010 census ===
As of the census of 2010, there were 464 people, 166 households, and 114 families residing in the city. The population density was 1,546.7 inhabitants per square mile (597.2/km^{2}). There were 189 housing units at an average density of 630.0 per square mile (243.2/km^{2}). The racial makeup of the city was 95.3% White, 0.4% African American, 1.1% Native American, 1.5% Asian, 0.9% from other races, and 0.9% from two or more races. Hispanic or Latino of any race were 4.1% of the population.

There were 166 households, of which 33.7% had children under the age of 18 living with them, 48.2% were married couples living together, 15.1% had a female householder with no husband present, 5.4% had a male householder with no wife present, and 31.3% were non-families. 25.9% of all households were made up of individuals, and 10.2% had someone living alone who was 65 years of age or older. The average household size was 2.54 and the average family size was 2.97.

The median age in the city was 42.8 years. 23.1% of residents were under the age of 18; 7.1% were between the ages of 18 and 24; 22.2% were from 25 to 44; 24.4% were from 45 to 64; and 23.3% were 65 years of age or older. The gender makeup of the city was 48.1% male and 51.9% female.

=== 2000 census ===
As of the census of 2000, there were 510 people, 172 households, and 129 families residing in the city. The population density was 1,812.5 inhabitants per square mile (699.8/km^{2}). There were 187 housing units at an average density of 664.6 per square mile (256.6/km^{2}). The racial makeup of the city was 95.88% White, 1.76% Native American, 0.20% Asian, and 2.16% from two or more races. Hispanic or Latino of any race were 1.96% of the population.

There were 172 households, out of which 39.5% had children under the age of 18 living with them, 63.4% were married couples living together, 8.7% had a female householder with no husband present, and 25.0% were non-families. 22.1% of all households were made up of individuals, and 10.5% had someone living alone who was 65 years of age or older. The average household size was 2.74 and the average family size was 3.20.

In the city, the population was spread out, with 27.6% under the age of 18, 7.3% from 18 to 24, 30.0% from 25 to 44, 17.5% from 45 to 64, and 17.6% who were 65 years of age or older. The median age was 36 years. For every 100 females, there were 80.9 males. For every 100 females age 18 and over, there were 76.6 males.

The median income for a household in the city was $36,250, and the median income for a family was $39,531. Males had a median income of $28,500 versus $21,250 for females. The per capita income for the city was $14,730. About 5.5% of families and 6.9% of the population were below the poverty line, including 15.3% of those under age 18 and none of those age 65 or over.

== Education ==
The community is served by Central Heights USD 288 public school district, also serving the communities of Lane, Princeton, and Rantoul. Their school mascot is the Central Heights Vikings.

Prior to school unification in 1965, the Richmond High School mascot was the Richmond Falcons.
