= Rantoul, Kansas =

City in Franklin County, Kansas

- City
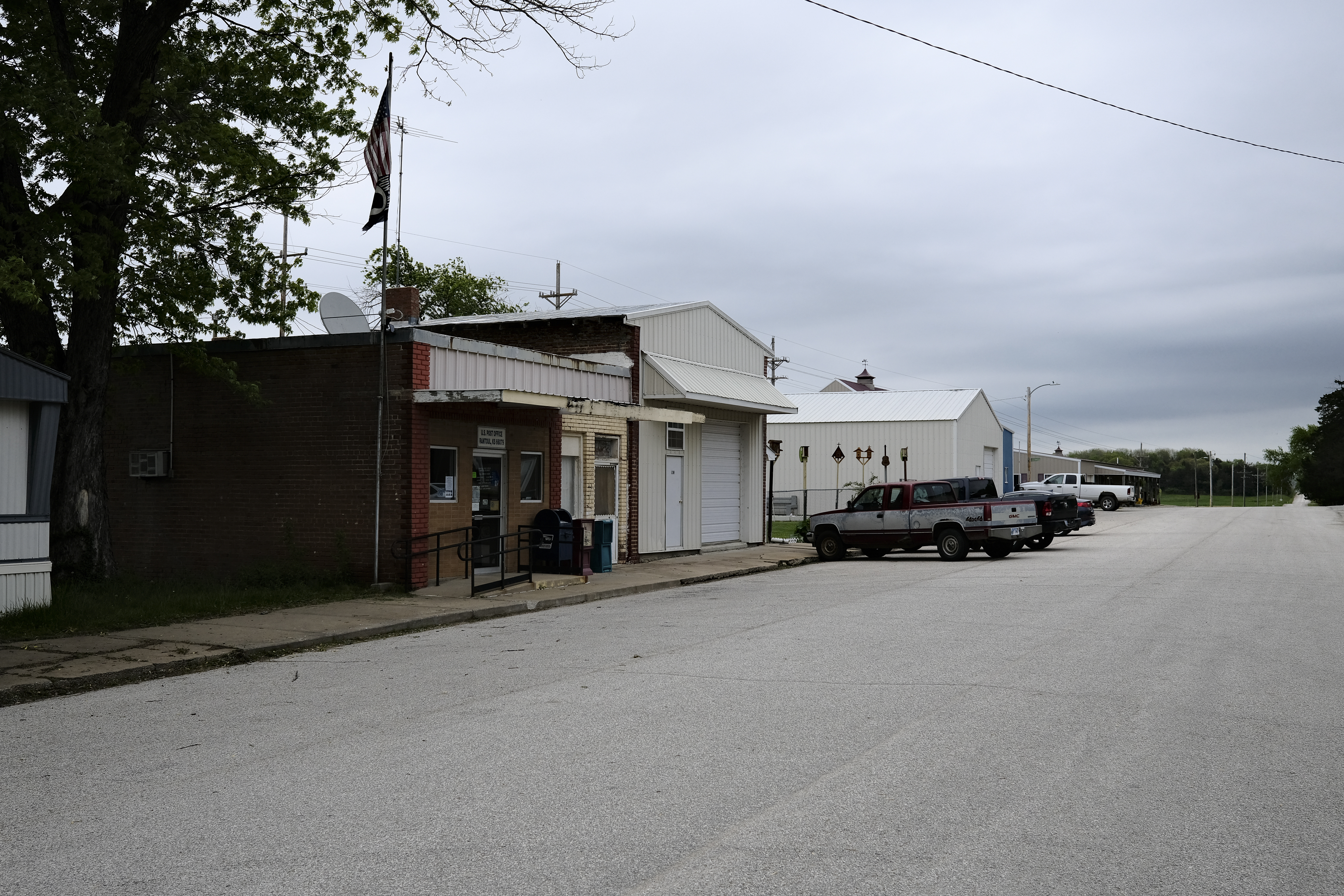
- Main Street (2022)

- Location within Franklin County and Kansas

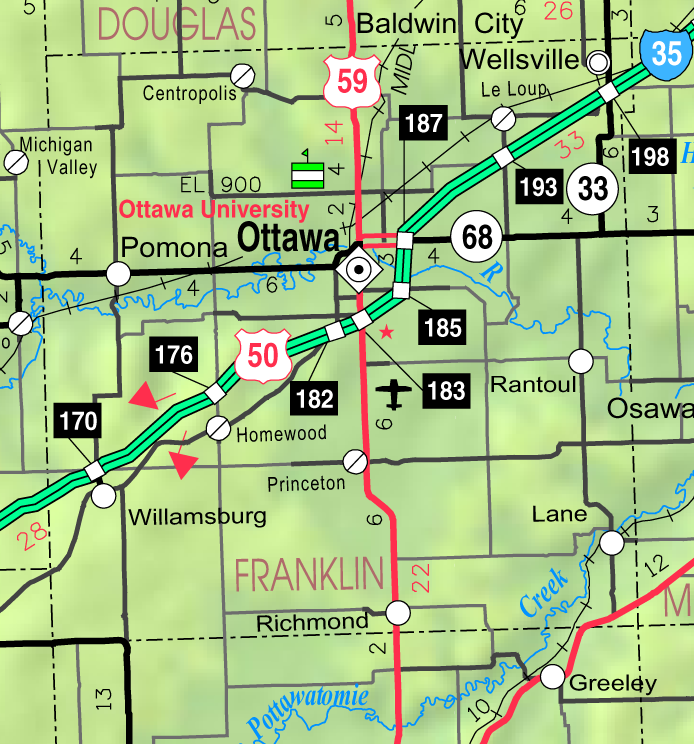
- KDOT map of Franklin County (legend)
- Coordinates: 38°32′54″N 95°06′04″W
- Country: United States
- State: Kansas
- County: Franklin
- Incorporated: 1913
- Named for: Robert Rantoul Jr.

Area
  - Total: 0.15 sq mi (0.38 km^{2})
  - Land: 0.15 sq mi (0.38 km^{2})
  - Water: 0 sq mi (0.00 km^{2})
- Elevation: 902 ft (275 m)

Population (2020)
  - Total: 165
  - Density: 1,100/sq mi (430/km^{2})
- Time zone: UTC-6 (CST)
  - Summer (DST): UTC-5 (CDT)
- ZIP Code: 66079
- Area code: 785
- FIPS code: 20-58525
- GNIS ID: 2396322
- Website: City info

Rantoul is a city in Franklin County, Kansas, United States. As of the 2020 census, the population of the city was 165.

== History ==
The first post office in Rantoul was established in 1862. It was named for Senator Robert Rantoul Jr., of Massachusetts.

== Geography ==
According to the United States Census Bureau, the city has a total area of 0.15 square miles (0.39 km^{2}), all land.

== Demographics ==
Historical population
| Census | Pop. | Note | %± |
|---|---|---|---|
| 1920 | 317 | | — |
| 1930 | 224 | | −29.3% |
| 1940 | 164 | | −26.8% |
| 1950 | 197 | | 20.1% |
| 1960 | 157 | | −20.3% |
| 1970 | 163 | | 3.8% |
| 1980 | 212 | | 30.1% |
| 1990 | 200 | | −5.7% |
| 2000 | 241 | | 20.5% |
| 2010 | 184 | | −23.7% |
| 2020 | 165 | | −10.3% |
U.S. Decennial Census

=== 2020 census ===
The 2020 United States census counted 165 people, 69 households, and 47 families in Rantoul. The population density was 1,122.4 per square mile (433.4/km^{2}). There were 80 housing units at an average density of 544.2 per square mile (210.1/km^{2}). The racial makeup was 87.88% (145) white or European American (87.88% non-Hispanic white), 0.0% (0) black or African-American, 1.82% (3) Native American or Alaska Native, 1.21% (2) Asian, 0.0% (0) Pacific Islander or Native Hawaiian, 0.0% (0) from other races, and 9.09% (15) from two or more races. Hispanic or Latino of any race was 1.21% (2) of the population.

Of the 69 households, 23.2% had children under the age of 18; 43.5% were married couples living together; 27.5% had a female householder with no spouse or partner present. 27.5% of households consisted of individuals and 15.9% had someone living alone who was 65 years of age or older. The average household size was 3.0 and the average family size was 3.4. The percent of those with a bachelor's degree or higher was estimated to be 5.5% of the population.

16.4% of the population was under the age of 18, 11.5% from 18 to 24, 21.8% from 25 to 44, 29.1% from 45 to 64, and 21.2% who were 65 years of age or older. The median age was 45.3 years. For every 100 females, there were 91.9 males. For every 100 females ages 18 and older, there were 100.0 males.

The 2016–2020 5-year American Community Survey estimates show that the median household income was $41,042 (with a margin of error of +/- $15,175) and the median family income was $40,250 (+/- $11,072). Males had a median income of $18,864 (+/- $12,323) versus $17,045 (+/- $6,039) for females. The median income for those above 16 years old was $18,409 (+/- $5,948). Approximately, 27.3% of families and 26.9% of the population were below the poverty line, including 44.4% of those under the age of 18 and 0.0% of those ages 65 or over.

=== 2010 census ===
At the 2010 census there were 184 people in 74 households, including 50 families, in the city. The population density was 1,226.7 inhabitants per square mile (473.6/km^{2}). There were 82 housing units at an average density of 546.7 per square mile (211.1/km^{2}). The racial makeup of the city was 96.7% White, 0.5% African American, and 2.7% from other races. Hispanic or Latino of any race were 2.7%.

Of the 74 households 32.4% had children under the age of 18 living with them, 48.6% were married couples living together, 13.5% had a female householder with no husband present, 5.4% had a male householder with no wife present, and 32.4% were non-families. 27.0% of households were one person and 10.9% were one person aged 65 or older. The average household size was 2.49 and the average family size was 3.02.

The median age was 40.9 years. 24.5% of residents were under the age of 18; 7.6% were between the ages of 18 and 24; 22.8% were from 25 to 44; 30.5% were from 45 to 64; and 14.7% were 65 or older. The gender makeup of the city was 46.7% male and 53.3% female.

== Education ==
Rantoul is a part of Central Heights USD 288 school district, headquarters located in Richmond. School mascot is Central Heights Vikings.

Rantoul schools were closed through school unification in 1965. The Rantoul High School mascot was Rantoul Bulldogs.
