= Hayes Township, Franklin County, Kansas =

Hayes Township
- Township
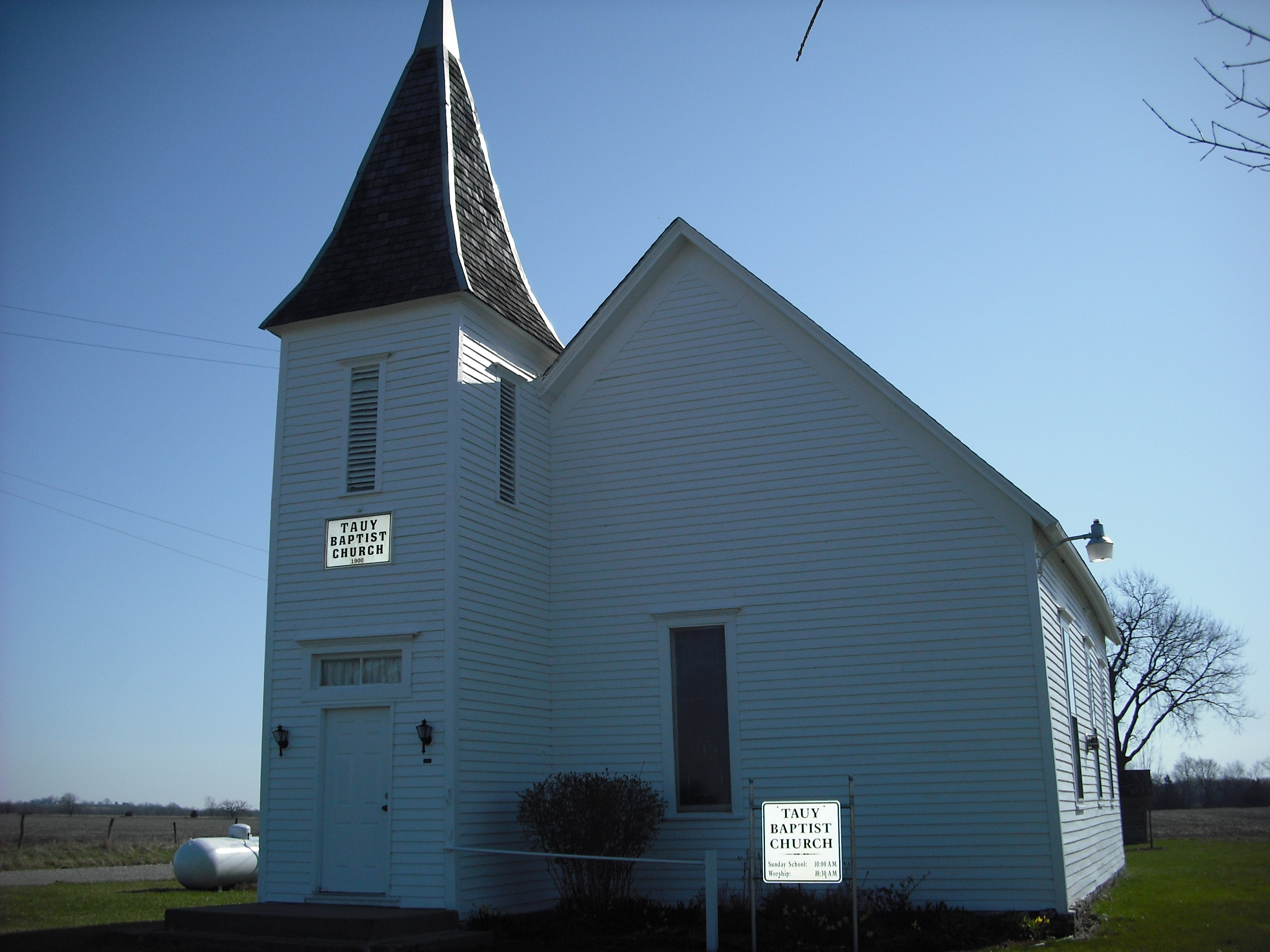
- Tauy Baptist Church

- Location in Franklin County
- Coordinates: 38°42′10″N 095°12′51″W
- Country: United States
- State: Kansas
- County: Franklin

Area
  - Total: 29.8 sq mi (77.2 km^{2})
  - Land: 29.70 sq mi (76.92 km^{2})
  - Water: 0.11 sq mi (0.28 km^{2}) 0.36%
- Elevation: 932 ft (284 m)

Population (2020)
  - Total: 431
  - Density: 14.5/sq mi (5.60/km^{2})
- GNIS ID: 0479357

Hayes Township is a township in Franklin County, Kansas, United States. As of the 2020 census, its population was 431.

== Geography ==
Hayes Township covers an area of 29.81 square miles (77.2 km^{2}) and contains no incorporated settlements.

The streams of East Fork Tauy Creek, Middle Fork Tauy Creek and Spring Creek run through this township.
