= Centropolis Township, Kansas =

Centropolis Township
- Township
- Location in Franklin County
- Coordinates: 38°40′55″N 095°22′16″W
- Country: United States
- State: Kansas
- County: Franklin

Area
  - Total: 40.82 sq mi (105.72 km^{2})
  - Land: 40.68 sq mi (105.36 km^{2})
  - Water: 0.14 sq mi (0.36 km^{2}) 0.34%
- Elevation: 1,004 ft (306 m)

Population (2020)
  - Total: 1,006
  - Density: 24.73/sq mi (9.548/km^{2})
- GNIS feature ID: 0479339

Centropolis Township is a township in Franklin County, Kansas, United States. As of the 2020 census, its population was 1,006.

== Geography ==
Centropolis Township covers an area of 40.82 square miles (105.7 km^{2}) and contains no incorporated settlements. According to the USGS, it contains two cemeteries: Kaub and Pleasant Hill.

The streams of Cole Creek, Minneola Creek and West Fork Eightmile Creek run through this township.
