= Greenwood Township, Franklin County, Kansas =

Greenwood Township
- Township
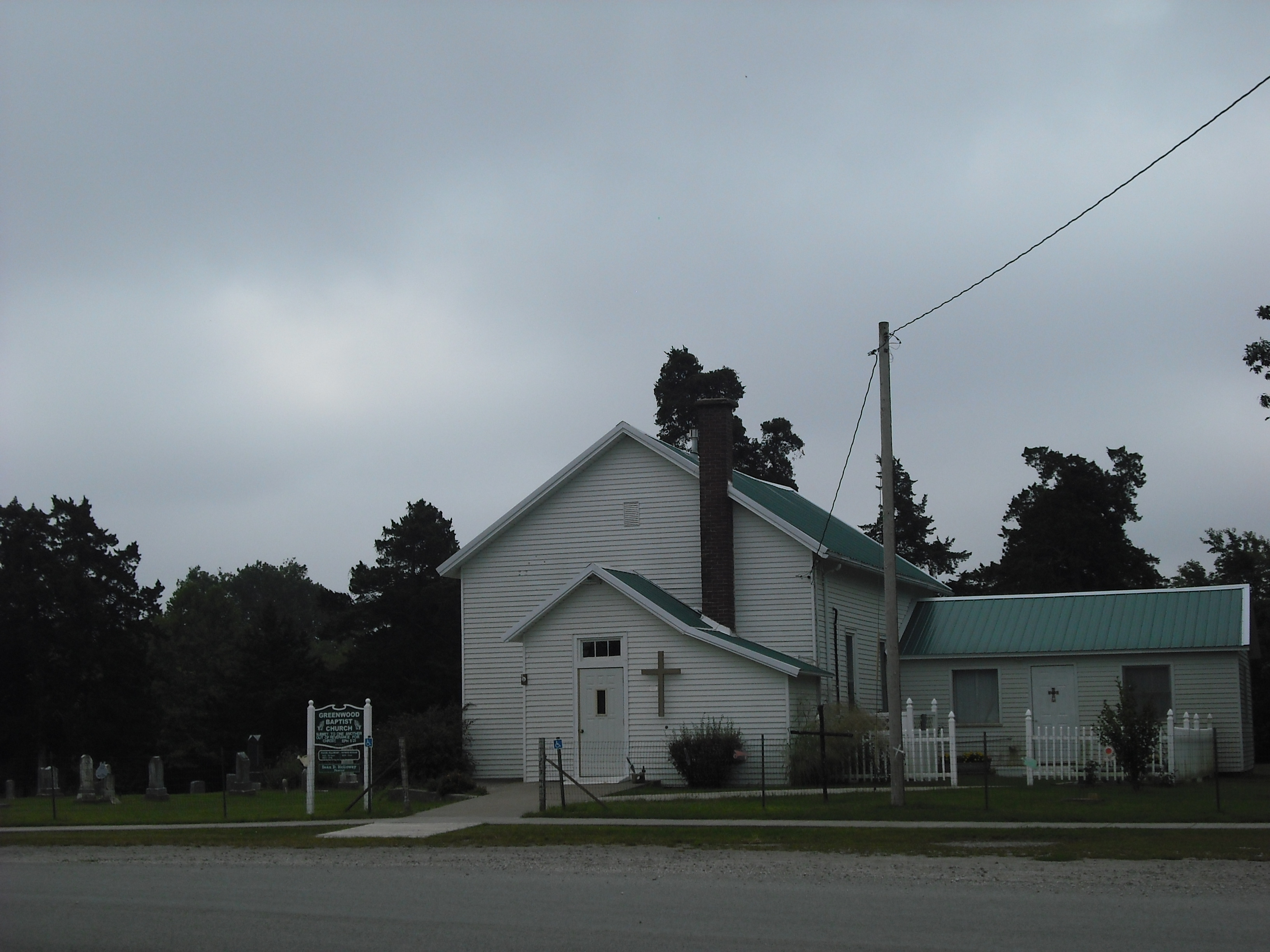
- Greenwood Baptist Church and Cemetery

- Location in Franklin County
- Coordinates: 38°33′53″N 095°27′09″W
- Country: United States
- State: Kansas
- County: Franklin

Area
  - Total: 30.47 sq mi (78.92 km^{2})
  - Land: 30.44 sq mi (78.85 km^{2})
  - Water: 0.023 sq mi (0.06 km^{2}) 0.08%
- Elevation: 1,093 ft (333 m)

Population (2020)
  - Total: 403
  - Density: 13.2/sq mi (5.11/km^{2})
- Time zone: UTC-6 (CST)
  - Summer (DST): UTC-5 (CDT)
- GNIS ID: 479626

Greenwood Township is a township in Franklin County, Kansas, United States. As of the 2020 census, its population was 403.

== Geography ==
Greenwood Township covers an area of 30.47 square miles (78.9 km^{2}) and contains no incorporated settlements.

The streams of Coal Creek, Kelsey Creek, Little Sac Branch and Whisky Creek run through this township.

== History ==
The Sac and Fox Agency post office opened in 1855. It was renamed to Greenwood in 1861 but was discontinued in 1872. Greenwood Township was organized in 1865 from a part of Ohio Township. The Sac and Fox agency itself was removed from the territory in 1863 to Quenemo, Osage County, and the first settlement in Greenwood occurred that year^{:621}.

The town of Greenwood is located where the Sac and Fox Agency used to be. It was here where Keokuk and the other Sac nation members were relocated after the Black Hawk War.

When the Indians were removed it was determined to start a town. Judge G. B. Greenwood, of Arkansas, then United States Commissioner of Indian Affairs, assisted in making the treaty. The original settlers laid out the town and named it after Judge Greenwood. Two or three houses were built, but the town never prospered, but instead, passed rapidly out of existence.

The settlement of Greenwood is survived by the Greenwood Cemetery, Greenwood Community Church, and Greenwood Community Building.

== Cemeteries ==
Greenwood Township contains the cemeteries of Central, Davidson, Greenwood, Hard Fish, and Keokuk.

== Transportation ==
Greenwood Township contains one airport or landing strip, Chippewa Ranch Airport.
