= Foster Dwight Coburn =

American farmer and statesman

F. D. Coburn
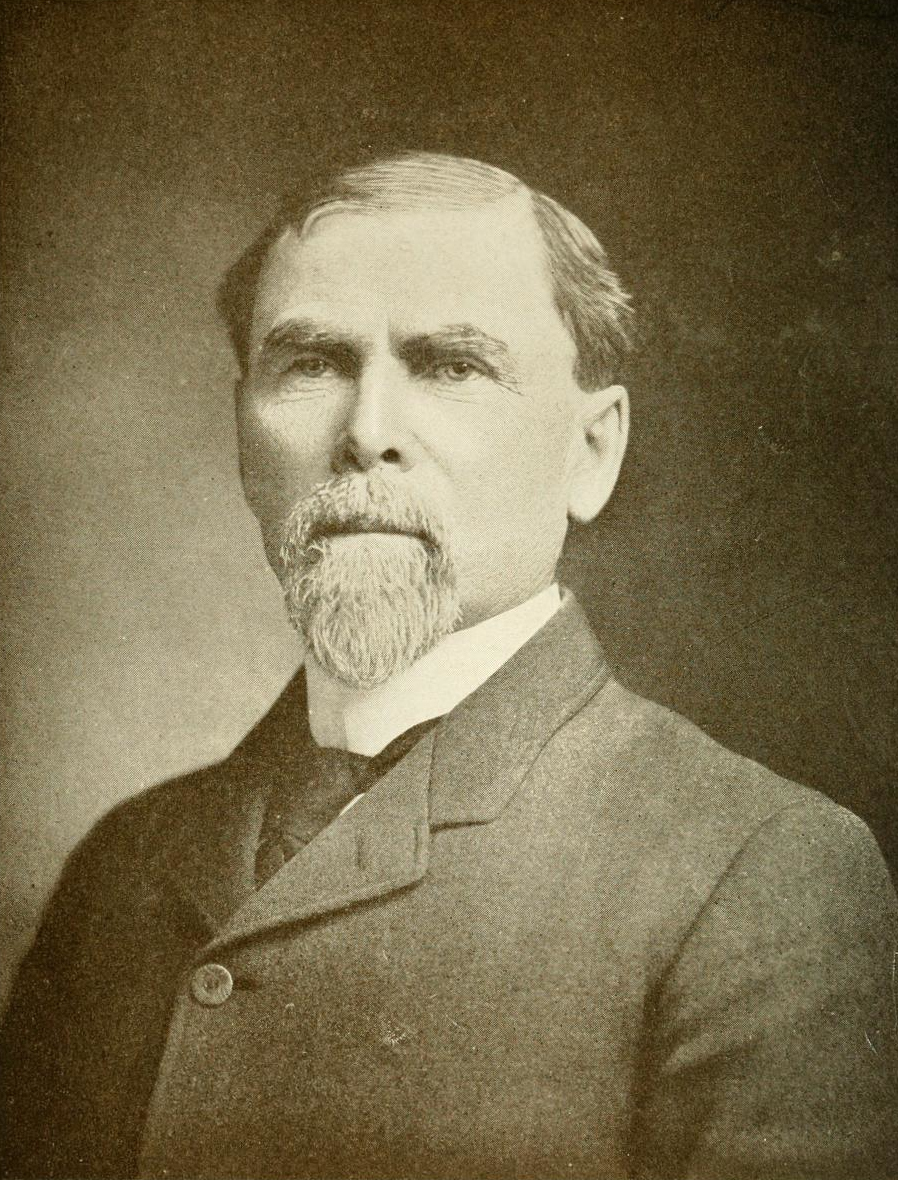

Secretary of the Kansas Department of Agriculture
- In office October 1881 – January 11, 1882
- Governor: John St. John
- Preceded by: Joseph K. Hudson
- Succeeded by: William Sims
- In office January 12, 1894 – June 30, 1914
- Governor: Lorenzo D. Lewelling; Edmund N. Morrill; John W. Leedy; William E. Stanley; Willis J. Bailey; Edward W. Hoch; Walter R. Stubbs; George H. Hodges
- Preceded by: Martin Mohler
- Succeeded by: Jacob C Mohler

Personal details
- Born: May 7, 1846 Jefferson County, Wisconsin, US
- Died: May 11, 1924 (aged 78)
- Party: Republican

Military service
- Allegiance: Union
- Branch/service: Army

Foster Dwight Coburn (May 7, 1846 – May 11, 1924) was an American farmer and statesman. He served as secretary of the Kansas Department of Agriculture.

== Early life and education ==
He was born Dwight Foster Coburn in Coldspring Township, Jefferson County, Wisconsin in 1846, a son of Ephraim W. and Mary Jane (Mulks) Coburn. He was reared on a farm until the age of 13 years. He received his elementary education in the country schools.

== Career ==
At the age of 18, he enlisted and served during the latter years of the American Civil War in two Illinois regiments—first as corporal in Company F, One Hundred and Thirty-fifth infantry, and subsequently as private and sergeant-major of the Sixty-second veteran infantry. In the winter of 1866, his Army career ended at Fort Gibson. He was by then a Sergeant-Major. After several months he walked across the frozen Missouri river into Kansas to find his former commander. Finally settling in Franklin County, Kansas in 1867. There he took work as a farm hand making $12 a month, and later worked his own farm and bred improved livestock. In addition, He taught at the local school. During this time, he left such an impression that the residents would later insist their new post office be named Coburn. It was during this these early years that he wrote his first book Swine Husbandry and the notoriety this brought would lead him far. His time as secretary of agriculture begins when Joseph K. Hudson, then secretary of Agriculture recruited F. D. to his clerkship and made sure he was his successor.

Coburn served for 20 years as Secretary of Agriculture for Kansas. During his tenure, he became an internationally recognized expert on agriculture and a very popular republican in that state. Being a very humble man, he refused appointments to the US Senate and US Secretary of Agriculture in order to continue serving Kansas.

== Service, honors, and achievements ==
- Editor of the Live Stock Indicator published at Kansas City, Missouri
- President of the Indicator Publishing Company
- President (1883) and vice-president of the board of regents of the Kansas State Agricultural College
- Judge of swine at the 1884 World Cotton Centennial
- Judge of swine at the 1893 World's Columbian Exposition;
- Chief of the department of live stock at the 1904 Louisiana Purchase Exposition
- President of the first national corn congress at Chicago in 1898
- Director and vice-president of the Prudential Trust Company
- Director of the Prudential State Bank
- Vice-president and a director of the Capitol Building and Loan Association, all of Topeka.
- Honorary life member of the Kansas State Horticultural Society
- Honorary member of the Kansas State Editorial Association
- Director of the Kansas State Historical Society.
- Honorary degree of A. M. from Baker University
- Honorary degree of LL. D. from the Kansas State Agricultural College.

== Personal life ==
In 1869, he married Miss Lou Jenkins, and they had two daughters, and a son, Clay. His daughter Gertrude, attended the Kansas Agricultural College and later was Head of Domestic Economy at the Stout Manual Training School.

== Partial works ==
Swine Husbandry

The Book of Alfalfa

Much of his popularity results from the many books and reports that he wrote and published. These books were translated into many languages and used as textbooks as far away as Australia, and were known as Coburn's red line series

- Swine Husbandry (1877)
- The Modern Sheep (1893)
- Kansas and her resources (1902)
- Alfalfa, lucerne, Spanish trefoil, Chilian clover, Brazilian clover, French clover, medic, purple medic: practical information on its production, qualities, worth and uses, especially in the United States and Canada (1907)
- Swine in America (1916)
- Agriculture and Homemaking
- The Beef Steer and His Sister
- Alfalfa Growing
- The Book of Alfalfa
- Alfalfa, Irrigation, Irrigation and Subsoiling
- Cow Culture
- Corn and the Sorghums
- Feeding Wheat to Farm animals, which was written in a year that had a bad corn crop and helped farmers in dire need of a solution to feed their animals.
- The Crop Killer, a Loving Tribute
- The Helpful Hen
- The Plow, Cow and Steer
- Railroads and Agriculture
- Pork Production
- Potato Production
- Wheat Growing
- Forage and Fodders
- The Horse Useful
- Modern Dairying
- Profitable Poultry
- Short-Horn Cattle
- Hereford Cattle
- Polled Cattle
- Kansas Wheat-growing
