= Homewood Township, Kansas =

Homewood Township
- Township
- Location in Franklin County
- Coordinates: 38°30′25″N 095°23′16″W
- Country: United States
- State: Kansas
- County: Franklin

Area
  - Total: 30.13 sq mi (78.03 km^{2})
  - Land: 30.05 sq mi (77.82 km^{2})
  - Water: 0.081 sq mi (0.21 km^{2}) 0.27%
- Elevation: 1,040 ft (317 m)

Population (2020)
  - Total: 550
  - Density: 18/sq mi (7.1/km^{2})
- GNIS feature ID: 0479641

Homewood Township is a township in Franklin County, Kansas, United States. As of the 2020 census, its population was 550.

== Geography ==
Homewood Township covers an area of 30.13 square miles (78.0 km^{2}) and contains no incorporated settlements. According to the USGS, it contains four cemeteries: Antioch, Middle Creek, Mount Pleasant and Saint Johns.
