= Princeton, Kansas =

City in Franklin County, Kansas

- City
- Location within Franklin County and Kansas

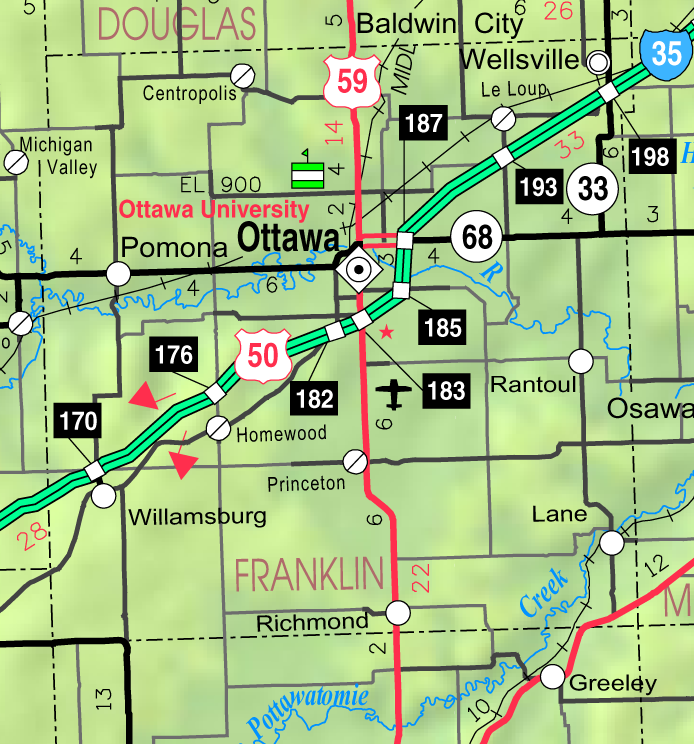
- KDOT map of Franklin County (legend)
- Coordinates: 38°29′18″N 95°16′13″W
- Country: United States
- State: Kansas
- County: Franklin
- Founded: 1869
- Incorporated: 1921
- Named for: Princeton, Illinois

Area
  - Total: 0.35 sq mi (0.91 km^{2})
  - Land: 0.35 sq mi (0.90 km^{2})
  - Water: 0.0039 sq mi (0.01 km^{2})
- Elevation: 965 ft (294 m)

Population (2020)
  - Total: 248
  - Density: 710/sq mi (280/km^{2})
- Time zone: UTC-6 (CST)
  - Summer (DST): UTC-5 (CDT)
- ZIP Code: 66078
- Area code: 785
- FIPS code: 20-57725
- GNIS ID: 2396282

Princeton is a city in Franklin County, Kansas, United States. As of the 2020 census, the population of the city was 248.

== History ==
Princeton had its start about 1869 by the building of the railroad through that territory. It was named after the city of Princeton, Illinois.

The railroad no longer runs through Princeton, and the former tracks have been converted into the Prairie Spirit rail trail.

== Geography ==
Princeton is located at 38°29′18″N 95°16′13″W (38.488387, -95.270357). According to the United States Census Bureau, the city has a total area of 0.33 square miles (0.85 km^{2}), all land.

== Demographics ==
Historical population
Census	Pop.	Note	%±
1880	103		—
1930	210		—
1940	187		−11.0%
1950	177		−5.3%
1960	174		−1.7%
1970	159		−8.6%
1980	244		53.5%
1990	275		12.7%
2000	317		15.3%
2010	277		−12.6%
2020	248		−10.5%
U.S. Decennial Census

=== 2020 census ===
The 2020 United States census counted 248 people, 109 households, and 77 families in Princeton. The population density was 637.5 per square mile (246.2/km^{2}). There were 112 housing units at an average density of 287.9 per square mile (111.2/km^{2}). The racial makeup was 93.15% (231) white or European American (91.94% non-Hispanic white), 0.81% (2) black or African-American, 0.4% (1) Native American or Alaska Native, 1.21% (3) Asian, 0.0% (0) Pacific Islander or Native Hawaiian, 0.81% (2) from other races, and 3.63% (9) from two or more races. Hispanic or Latino of any race was 5.24% (13) of the population.

Of the 109 households, 33.9% had children under the age of 18; 47.7% were married couples living together; 25.7% had a female householder with no spouse or partner present. 19.3% of households consisted of individuals and 6.4% had someone living alone who was 65 years of age or older. The average household size was 2.5 and the average family size was 3.0. The percent of those with a bachelor's degree or higher was estimated to be 6.9% of the population.

25.8% of the population was under the age of 18, 4.4% from 18 to 24, 24.2% from 25 to 44, 31.0% from 45 to 64, and 14.5% who were 65 years of age or older. The median age was 41.8 years. For every 100 females, there were 96.8 males. For every 100 females ages 18 and older, there were 100.0 males.

The 2016–2020 5-year American Community Survey estimates show that the median household income was $46,250 (with a margin of error of +/- $19,952) and the median family income was $61,375 (+/- $3,209). Males had a median income of $34,500 (+/- $6,370) versus $27,000 (+/- $4,553) for females. The median income for those above 16 years old was $29,792 (+/- $7,423). Approximately, 1.7% of families and 8.8% of the population were below the poverty line, including 13.7% of those under the age of 18 and 21.6% of those ages 65 or over.

=== 2010 census ===
As of the census of 2010, there were 277 people, 109 households, and 78 families residing in the city. The population density was 839.4 inhabitants per square mile (324.1/km^{2}). There were 121 housing units at an average density of 366.7 per square mile (141.6/km^{2}). The racial makeup of the city was 95.3% White, 1.1% Native American, and 3.6% from two or more races. Hispanic or Latino of any race were 4.3% of the population.

There were 109 households, of which 37.6% had children under the age of 18 living with them, 53.2% were married couples living together, 14.7% had a female householder with no husband present, 3.7% had a male householder with no wife present, and 28.4% were non-families. 22.0% of all households were made up of individuals, and 6.4% had someone living alone who was 65 years of age or older. The average household size was 2.54 and the average family size was 2.97.

The median age in the city was 33.5 years. 27.4% of residents were under the age of 18; 9.1% were between the ages of 18 and 24; 25.6% were from 25 to 44; 26.7% were from 45 to 64; and 11.2% were 65 years of age or older. The gender makeup of the city was 45.8% male and 54.2% female.

=== 2000 census ===
As of the census of 2000, there were 317 people, 111 households, and 88 families residing in the city. The population density was 941.9 inhabitants per square mile (363.7/km^{2}). There were 118 housing units at an average density of 350.6 per square mile (135.4/km^{2}). The racial makeup of the city was 95.90% White, 0.63% African American, 0.63% Asian, and 2.84% from two or more races. 0.63% of the population were Hispanic or Latino of any race.

There were 111 households, out of which 45.0% had children under the age of 18 living with them, 65.8% were married couples living together, 9.9% had a female householder with no husband present, and 20.7% were non-families. 18.9% of all households were made up of individuals, and 9.0% had someone living alone who was 65 years of age or older. The average household size was 2.86 and the average family size was 3.19.

In the city, the population was spread out, with 33.4% under the age of 18, 9.5% from 18 to 24, 29.3% from 25 to 44, 18.3% from 45 to 64, and 9.5% who were 65 years of age or older. The median age was 32 years. For every 100 females, there were 109.9 males. For every 100 females age 18 and over, there were 95.4 males.

The median income for a household in the city was $33,333, and the median income for a family was $36,042. Males had a median income of $26,607 versus $20,139 for females. The per capita income for the city was $11,698. 8.5% of the population and 4.9% of families were below the poverty line. Out of the total population, 5.2% of those under the age of 18 and 23.1% of those 65 and older were living below the poverty line.

== Education ==
Princeton is a part of Central Heights USD 288 school district, headquarters located in Richmond. School mascot is Central Heights Vikings.

Princeton schools were closed through school unification in 1965. The Princeton High School mascot was Princeton Orioles.
