= Wellsville, Kansas =

City in Franklin County, Kansas

- City
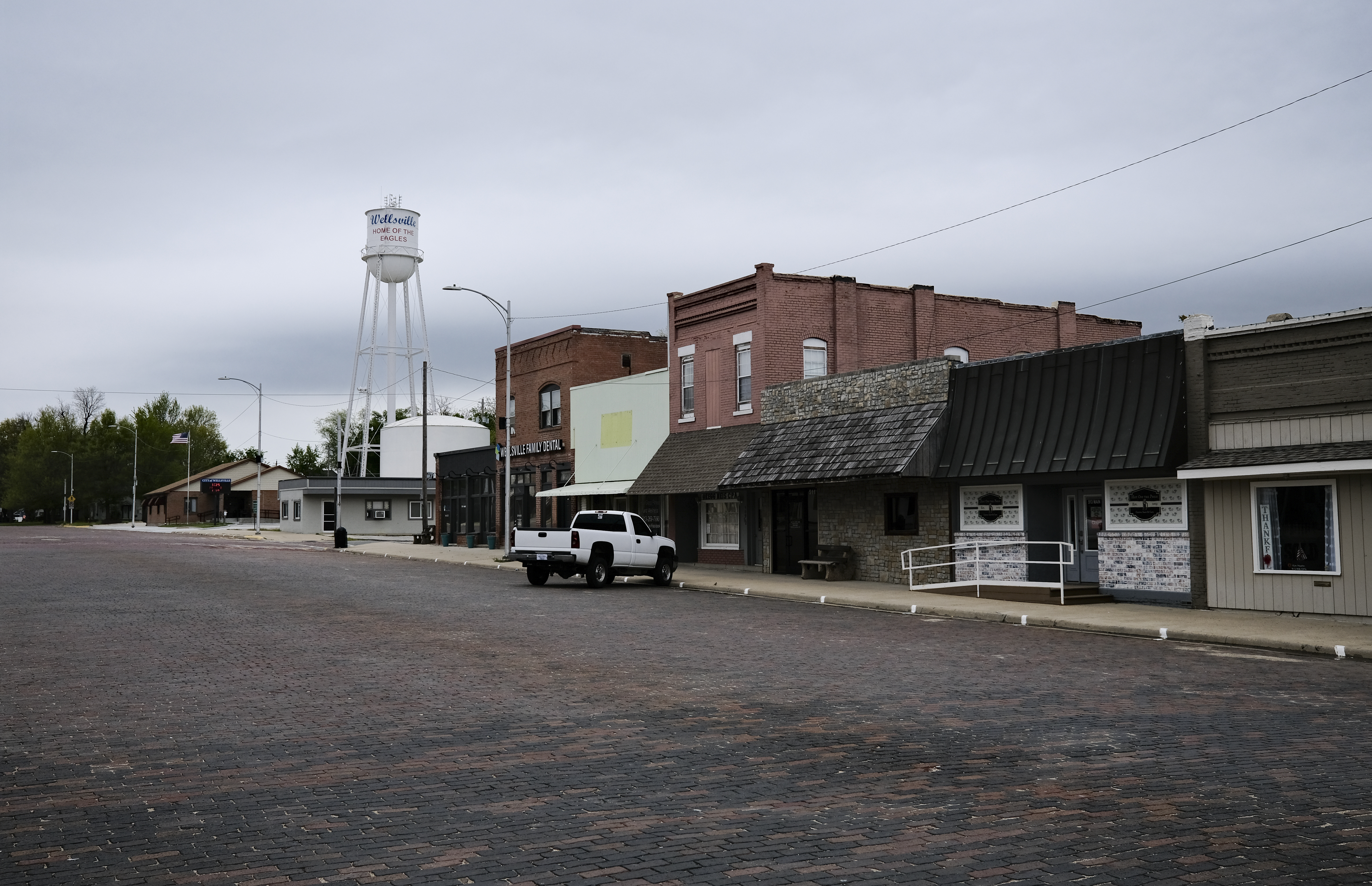
- Downtown (2022)

- Location within Franklin County and Kansas

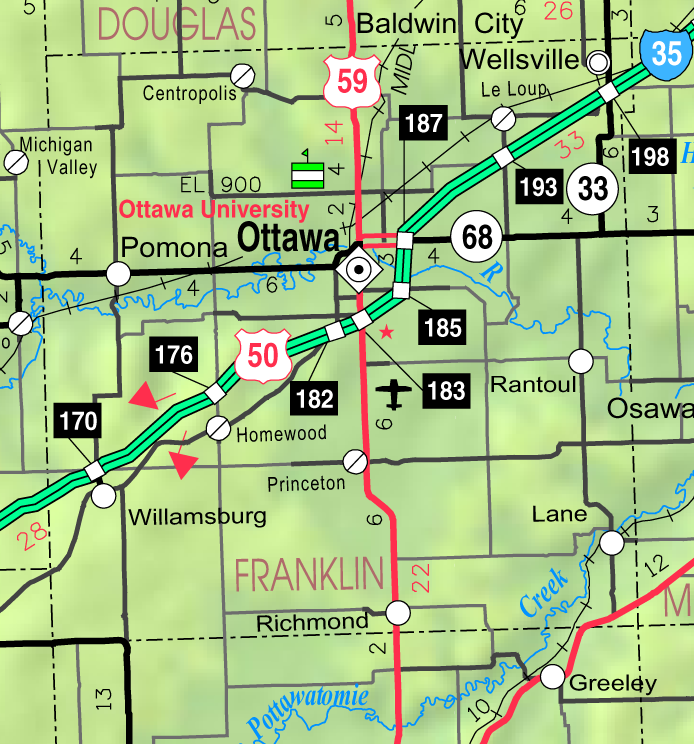
- KDOT map of Franklin County (legend)
- Coordinates: 38°43′03″N 95°04′40″W
- Country: United States
- State: Kansas
- County: Franklin
- Founded: 1870
- Platted: 1870
- Incorporated: 1884
- Named for: D.L. Wells

Area
  - Total: 1.42 sq mi (3.67 km^{2})
  - Land: 1.41 sq mi (3.65 km^{2})
  - Water: 0.012 sq mi (0.03 km^{2})
- Elevation: 1,056 ft (322 m)

Population (2020)
  - Total: 1,953
  - Density: 1,390/sq mi (535/km^{2})
- Time zone: UTC-6 (CST)
  - Summer (DST): UTC-5 (CDT)
- ZIP Code: 66092
- Area code: 785
- FIPS code: 20-76625
- GNIS ID: 2397253
- Website: cityofwellsvilleks.org

Wellsville is a city in Franklin County, Kansas, United States. As of the 2020 census, the population of the city was 1,953.

== History ==
Wellsville was platted in 1870. The community was named after D.L. Wells, a railroad construction engineer.

The first post office in Wellsville was established in October 1870.

On January 9, 1894, baseball star Charlie Bennett went hunting with pitcher John Clarkson. Bennett got off the train in Wellsville to speak to an acquaintance; when he tried to reboard, he slipped and fell under the train's wheels. Bennett lost both legs in the accident. He was fitted with artificial limbs but his baseball career was over; he lived until 1927.

== Geography ==
According to the United States Census Bureau, the city has a total area of 1.40 square miles (3.63 km^{2}), of which 1.39 square miles (3.60 km^{2}) is land and 0.01 square miles (0.03 km^{2}) is water.

== Demographics ==
Historical population
Census	Pop.	Note	%±
1880	143		—
1890	392		174.1%
1900	447		14.0%
1910	648		45.0%
1920	756		16.7%
1930	709		−6.2%
1940	632		−10.9%
1950	729		15.3%
1960	984		35.0%
1970	1,183		20.2%
1980	1,612		36.3%
1990	1,563		−3.0%
2000	1,606		2.8%
2010	1,857		15.6%
2020	1,953		5.2%
U.S. Decennial Census

=== 2020 census ===
As of the 2020 census, Wellsville had a population of 1,953. The median age was 36.5 years. 26.2% of residents were under the age of 18 and 17.2% of residents were 65 years of age or older. For every 100 females there were 91.8 males, and for every 100 females age 18 and over there were 90.6 males age 18 and over.

0.0% of residents lived in urban areas, while 100.0% lived in rural areas.

There were 760 households in Wellsville, of which 37.1% had children under the age of 18 living in them. Of all households, 47.0% were married-couple households, 19.5% were households with a male householder and no spouse or partner present, and 25.8% were households with a female householder and no spouse or partner present. About 29.4% of all households were made up of individuals and 13.0% had someone living alone who was 65 years of age or older.

There were 795 housing units, of which 4.4% were vacant. The homeowner vacancy rate was 0.8% and the rental vacancy rate was 4.5%.

Racial composition as of the 2020 census
Race	Number	Percent
White	1,794	91.9%
Black or African American	8	0.4%
American Indian and Alaska Native	19	1.0%
Asian	5	0.3%
Native Hawaiian and Other Pacific Islander	0	0.0%
Some other race	16	0.8%
Two or more races	111	5.7%
Hispanic or Latino (of any race)	55	2.8%

=== 2010 census ===
As of the census of 2010, there were 1,857 people, 722 households, and 500 families living in the city. The population density was 1,336.0 inhabitants per square mile (515.8/km^{2}). There were 780 housing units at an average density of 561.2 per square mile (216.7/km^{2}). The racial makeup of the city was 95.6% white, 0.7% African American, 0.6% Native American, 0.2% Asian, 0.6% from other races, and 2.4% from two or more races. Hispanic or Latino of any race were 3.2% of the population.

There were 722 households, of which 38.2% had children under the age of 18 living with them, 50.0% were married couples living together, 12.3% had a female householder with no husband present, 6.9% had a male householder with no wife present, and 30.7% were non-families. 26.3% of all households were made up of individuals, and 12.5% had someone living alone who was 65 years of age or older. The average household size was 2.52 and the average family size was 3.02.

The median age in the city was 35.4 years. 27.8% of residents were under the age of 18; 7% were between the ages of 18 and 24; 29.3% were from 25 to 44; 22.6% were from 45 to 64; and 13.3% were 65 years of age or older. The gender makeup of the city was 48.5% male and 51.5% female.

=== 2000 census ===
As of the census of 2000, there were 1,606 people, 636 households, and 435 families living in the city. The population density was 1,917.2 inhabitants per square mile (740.2/km^{2}). There were 666 housing units at an average density of 795.1 per square mile (307.0/km^{2}). The racial makeup of the city was 98.13% white, 0.19% African American, 0.50% Native American, 0.06% Asian, 0.06% from other races, and 1.06% from two or more races. Hispanic or Latino of any race were 0.75% of the population.

There were 636 households, out of which 37.3% had children under the age of 18 living with them, 53.3% were married couples living together, 9.9% had a female householder with no husband present, and 31.6% were non-families. 28.9% of all households were made up of individuals, and 13.5% had someone living alone who was 65 years of age or older. The average household size was 2.45 and the average family size was 3.02.

In the city, the population was spread out, with 28.6% under the age of 18, 8.0% from 18 to 24, 30.3% from 25 to 44, 19.2% from 45 to 64, and 14.0% who were 65 years of age or older. The median age was 34 years. For every 100 females, there were 93.7 males. For every 100 females age 18 and over, there were 88.7 males.

The median income for a household in the city was $38,456, and the median income for a family was $47,102. Males had a median income of $35,938 versus $25,250 for females. The per capita income for the city was $18,215. About 7.9% of families and 7.9% of the population were below the poverty line, including 7.6% of those under age 18 and 13.4% of those age 65 or over.

== Education ==
The community is served by Wellsville USD 289 public school district, which operates three separate schools:

- Wellsville High School
- Wellsville Middle School
- Wellsville Elementary School

== Notable people ==
- Bill Grigsby, sportscaster
- Elizabeth "Grandma" Layton, artist
- Mark Samsel, Attorney and Republican Kansas House member
- Chely Wright, singer, Academy of Country Music award-winning artist
