= Williamsburg, Kansas =

City in Franklin County, Kansas

- City
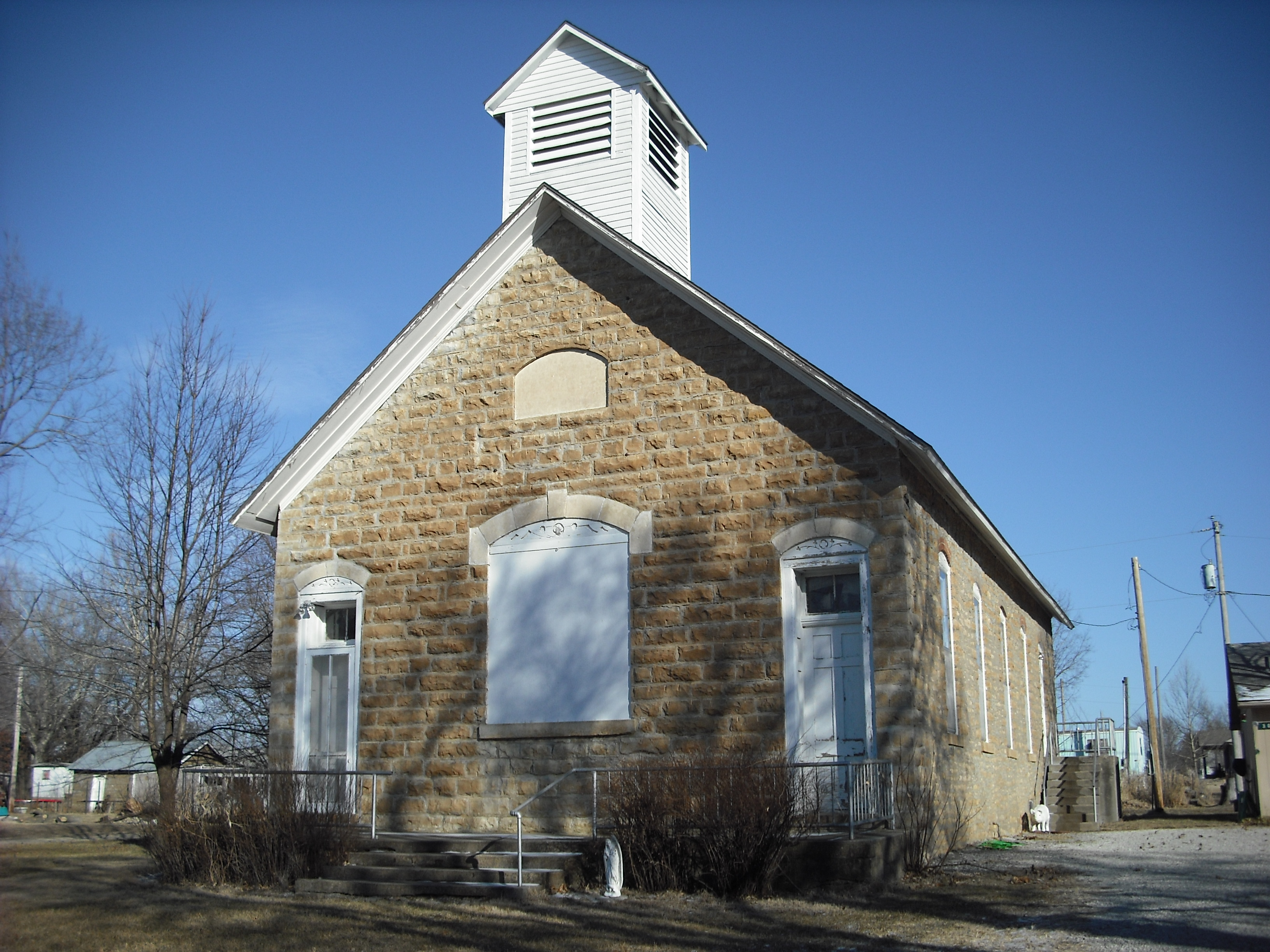
- Williamsburg Museum (2008)

- Location within Franklin County and Kansas

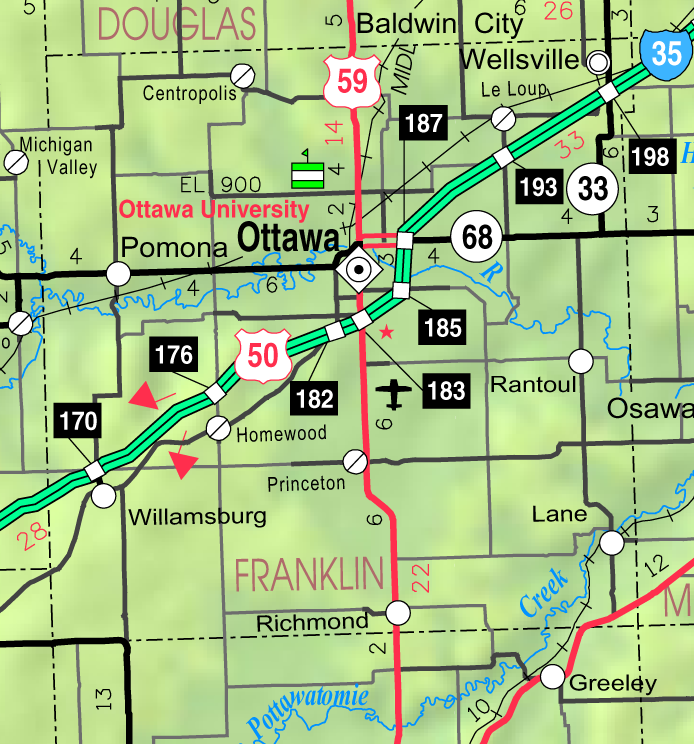
- KDOT map of Franklin County (legend)
- Coordinates: 38°28′50″N 95°28′05″W
- Country: United States
- State: Kansas
- County: Franklin
- Founded: 1868
- Incorporated: 1869
- Named for: William Schofield

Area
  - Total: 0.74 sq mi (1.92 km^{2})
  - Land: 0.74 sq mi (1.91 km^{2})
  - Water: 0.0039 sq mi (0.01 km^{2})
- Elevation: 1,142 ft (348 m)

Population (2020)
  - Total: 390
  - Density: 530/sq mi (200/km^{2})
- Time zone: UTC-6 (CST)
  - Summer (DST): UTC-5 (CDT)
- ZIP Code: 66095
- Area code: 785
- FIPS code: 20-79300
- GNIS ID: 2397319
- Website: williamsburgks.us

Williamsburg is a city in Franklin County, Kansas, United States. As of the 2020 census, the population of the city was 390.

== History ==
Williamsburg was founded in 1868. It was named for its founder, William Schofield.

The first post office in Williamsburg was established in April, 1869, and it was officially spelled Williamsburgh until 1894.

== Geography ==
According to the United States Census Bureau, the city has a total area of 0.66 square miles (1.71 km^{2}), of which 0.65 square miles (1.68 km^{2}) is land and 0.01 square miles (0.03 km^{2}) is water.

=== Climate ===
The climate in this area is characterized by hot, humid summers and generally mild to cool winters. According to the Köppen Climate Classification system, Williamsburg has a humid subtropical climate, abbreviated "Cfa" on climate maps.

== Demographics ==
Historical population
Census	Pop.	Note	%±
1880	419		—
1890	502		19.8%
1910	399		—
1920	404		1.3%
1930	367		−9.2%
1940	365		−0.5%
1950	297		−18.6%
1960	255		−14.1%
1970	286		12.2%
1980	362		26.6%
1990	261		−27.9%
2000	351		34.5%
2010	397		13.1%
2020	390		−1.8%
U.S. Decennial Census

=== 2010 census ===
As of the census of 2010, there were 397 people, 149 households, and 101 families living in the city. The population density was 610.8 inhabitants per square mile (235.8/km^{2}). There were 159 housing units at an average density of 244.6 per square mile (94.4/km^{2}). The racial makeup of the city was 96.2% white, 0.3% African American, 1.5% Native American, and 2.0% from two or more races. Hispanic or Latino of any race were 3.0% of the population.

There were 149 households, of which 34.2% had children under the age of 18 living with them, 52.3% were married couples living together, 8.1% had a female householder with no husband present, 7.4% had a male householder with no wife present, and 32.2% were non-families. 27.5% of all households were made up of individuals, and 12.7% had someone living alone who was 65 years of age or older. The average household size was 2.66 and the average family size was 3.26.

The median age in the city was 36.6 years. 27.7% of residents were under the age of 18; 9.8% were between the ages of 18 and 24; 26% were from 25 to 44; 21.7% were from 45 to 64; and 14.9% were 65 years of age or older. The gender makeup of the city was 52.4% male and 47.6% female.

=== 2000 census ===
As of the census of 2000, there were 351 people, 139 households, and 98 families living in the city. The population density was 1,036.0 inhabitants per square mile (400.0/km^{2}). There were 161 housing units at an average density of 475.2 per square mile (183.5/km^{2}). The racial makeup of the city was 97.15% white, 1.71% Native American, and 1.14% from two or more races. Hispanic or Latino of any race were 0.57% of the population.

There were 139 households, out of which 33.1% had children under the age of 18 living with them, 48.9% were married couples living together, 14.4% had a female householder with no husband present, and 28.8% were non-families. 28.1% of all households were made up of individuals, and 13.7% had someone living alone who was 65 years of age or older. The average household size was 2.53 and the average family size was 3.02.

In the city, the population was spread out, with 31.3% under the age of 18, 8.0% from 18 to 24, 26.5% from 25 to 44, 19.4% from 45 to 64, and 14.8% who were 65 years of age or older. The median age was 32 years. For every 100 females, there were 87.7 males. For every 100 females age 18 and over, there were 82.6 males.

The median income for a household in the city was $23,393, and the median income for a family was $25,000. Males had a median income of $21,354 versus $21,364 for females. The per capita income for the city was $10,451. About 18.2% of families and 17.4% of the population were below the poverty line, including 27.4% of those under age 18 and 7.7% of those age 65 or over.

== Education ==
Williamsburg is served by West Franklin USD 287 public school district. West Franklin High School is located in Pomona. The School District includes K-5 schools in Williamsburg and Appanoose Township. The West Franklin mascot is West Franklin Falcons.

The Williamsburg High School colors were purple and white with the mascot Williamsburg Panthers.

== Notable people ==
- Lou McEvoy, professional baseball pitcher for New York Yankees over parts of two seasons
- Willie Ramsdell, professional baseball pitcher for three teams over five seasons
