= Olivet Township, Kansas =

Township in Osage County, Kansas, U.S.

Olivet Township
- Township
- Location within Osage County
- Coordinates: 38.515554°N 95.731475°W
- Country: United States
- State: Kansas
- County: Osage

Area
  - Total: 61.753 sq mi (159.94 km^{2})
  - Land: 55.672 sq mi (144.19 km^{2})
  - Water: 6.081 sq mi (15.75 km^{2}) 9.85%
- Elevation: 1,034 ft (315 m)

Population (2020)
  - Total: 241
  - Density: 4.33/sq mi (1.67/km^{2})
- Time zone: UTC-6 (CST)
  - Summer (DST): UTC-5 (CDT)
- Area code: 785
- GNIS feature ID: 479603

Olivet Township is a township in Osage County, Kansas, United States. As of the 2020 census, its population was 241.

== Geography ==
Olivet Township covers an area of 61.753 square miles (159.94 square kilometers). The Marais des Cygnes River flows through it. Eisenhower State Park and most of Melvern Lake are within the township.

=== Communities ===
- Olivet

=== Adjacent townships ===
- Superior Township, Osage County (north)
- Valley Brook Township, Osage County (northeast)
- Melvern Township, Osage County (east)
- Key West Township, Coffey County (south)
- Arvonia Township, Osage County (southwest)
- Barclay Township, Osage County (northwest)

== Transportation ==
=== Major highways ===
- I-35
- US-50
- US-75
- K-31
- K-278
