= Melvern Township, Kansas =

Township in Osage County, Kansas, U.S.

Melvern Township
- Township
- Location within Osage County
- Coordinates: 38.497988°N 95.64296°W
- Country: United States
- State: Kansas
- County: Osage

Area
  - Total: 44.743 sq mi (115.88 km^{2})
  - Land: 44.709 sq mi (115.80 km^{2})
  - Water: 0.034 sq mi (0.088 km^{2}) 0.08%
- Elevation: 1,014 ft (309 m)

Population (2020)
  - Total: 729
  - Density: 16.3/sq mi (6.30/km^{2})
- Time zone: UTC-6 (CST)
  - Summer (DST): UTC-5 (CDT)
- Area code: 785
- GNIS feature ID: 479613

Melvern Township is a township in Osage County, Kansas, United States. As of the 2020 census, its population was 729.

== Geography ==
Melvern Township covers an area of 44.743 square miles (115.88 square kilometers). The Marais des Cygnes River flows through it.

=== Communities ===
- Melvern

=== Adjacent townships ===
- Valley Brook Township, Osage County (north)
- Agency Township, Osage County (northeast)
- Lincoln Township, Osage County (east)
- Rock Creek Township, Coffey County (southeast)
- Key West Township, Coffey County (southwest)
- Olivet Township, Osage County (west)

== Transportation ==
=== Major highways ===
- I-35
- US-50
- US-75
- K-31
