= K-268 (Kansas highway) =

State highway in Kansas, U.S.

K-268
- K-268 highlighted in red

Route information
- Maintained by KDOT
- Length: 9.490 mi (15.273 km)
- Existed: November 14, 1962–present

Major junctions
- West end: US-75 / K-31 north of Lyndon
- East end: K-68 north of Quenemo

Location
- Country: United States
- State: Kansas
- Counties: Osage

Highway system
- Kansas State Highway System; Interstate; US; State; Spurs
← K-267	→ K-269

K-268 is a 9.490-mile-long (15.273 km) east–west state highway in the U.S. state of Kansas. K-268's western terminus is at U.S. Route 75 (US-75) and K-31 north of Lyndon, and the eastern terminus is at K-68 north of Quenemo. There are no cities or towns along the highway, but it is a part of a direct link for traffic between Osage City and Ottawa. K-268 travels mostly through rural farmlands and is a two-lane road its entire length.

Before state highways were numbered in Kansas there were auto trails. The western terminus was part of the former Capitol Route. K-268 was first designated a state highway on November 14, 1962, to connect Pomona State Park to the State Highway System, and its alignment has not changed since. In 2014, due to repeated accidents, the western terminus was converted from a four-way intersection to a roundabout.

== Route description ==
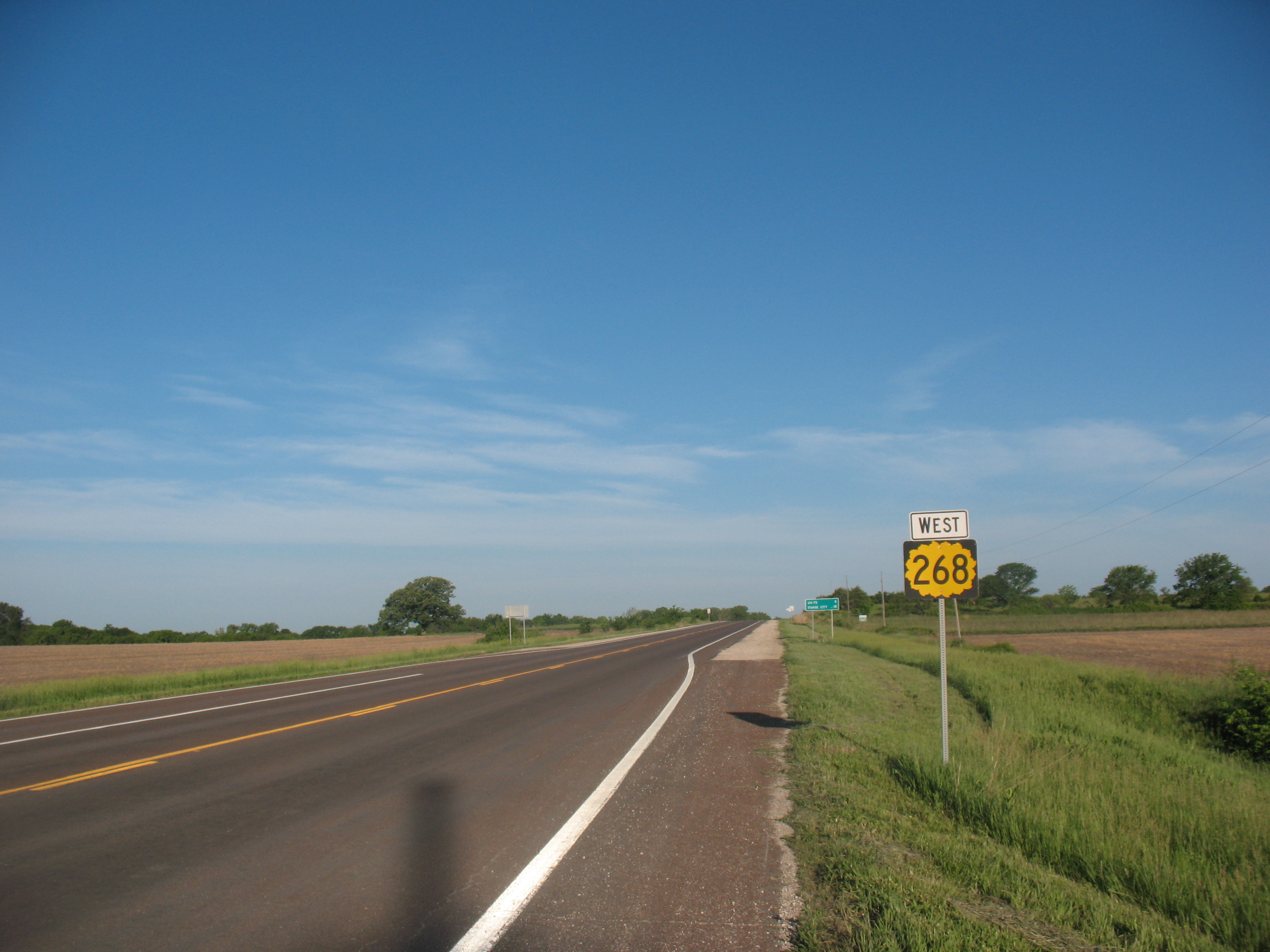
Westbound K-268 beginning at its eastern terminus

K-268's western terminus is at a roundabout intersection with US-75 and K-31 north of Lyndon. The highway heads east through flat farmland for about 1.5 miles (2.4 km) before reaching South California Road. The highway passes by a small group of houses and a slightly forested area and soon reaches South Berryton Road, which travels south to K-68. K-268 continues east for roughly one mile (1.6 km) and intersects South Croco Road, which travels north to Vassar. The highway continues east through farmland for one mile (1.6 km) and intersects K-368, a short spur that travels north to Pomona State Park. The highway continues for .25 miles (0.40 km) then crosses over Flint Hills Nature Trail, which was a former Missouri Pacific Railroad track. The roadway continues east through farmland with scattered areas of trees and soon intersects South Pomona Dam Road, which travels northeast and crosses the Pomona Lake dam. At this point it begins to curve to the southeast as the terrain becomes more hilly and covered with trees. K-268 travels southeast for roughly 2.5 miles (4.0 km) then curves back east and enters back into flat farmland. The highway continues for approximately 0.6 miles (0.97 km) before reaching its eastern terminus at K-68 north of Quenemo.

The Kansas Department of Transportation (KDOT) tracks the traffic levels on its highways, and in 2019, they determined that on average the traffic varied from 2,680 vehicles per day slightly east of the terminus with K-368 to 3,031 vehicles per day near the western terminus. K-268 is not included in the National Highway System. The National Highway System is a system of highways important to the nation's defense, economy, and mobility. K-268 does connect to the National Highway System at its terminus with US-75. The entire route is paved with full design bituminous pavement.

== History ==
Around 1910, a national system of auto trails was created in the United States as well as in Canada. K-92's western terminus (US-75) follows the former Capitol Route, which travelled from Austin, Texas north to Omaha, Nebraska. In Kansas it began at Oklahoma border and travelled north through Independence, Lyndon, Topeka, and Horton to the Nebraska border.

The U.S. Army Corps of Engineers began to construct Pomona Dam and its associated reservoir in July 1959. The federal agency agreed to relocate several county highways that would be displaced by the reservoir, and the Kansas State Highway Commission requested a pair of those highways–an east–west highway between US-75 and K-68 and an access road to the recreational land around the reservoir—be constructed to state highway standards. Then in a November 14, 1962 resolution, K-268 was approved from US-75 to K-68 south of the lake. Also at this time, K-368 was approved as a short spur from K-268 to link it to the recreation area by the lake. By July 1962, construction on the dam was 65 percent completed. By October 1963, the dam had been completed and started to store water. In November 1963, light surfacing work was done on K-268 and K-368, then in Spring 1964, a heavier road surface was applied to both K-268 and K-368. The $10,535.14 (equivalent to $110,789 in 2025) project was completed by Killough Construction Company of Ottawa. K-268 and K-368 first appear on the 1965 State Highway Map.

The western terminus was formerly a four-way intersection, and from January 2004 to August 2009, there was a total of 24 crashes, which included one fatality and fifteen that resulted in injuries. Residents of the surrounding communities requested a "safer type of intersection", then in late Fall of 2013, work began to reconstruct the intersection as a roundabout. On November 17, 2014, the new roundabout at the eastern terminus opened to unrestricted traffic. The project was fully completed by the end of December. Smoky Hill LLC from Salina, was the primary contractor on the $2.541 million (equivalent to $3.46 million in 2025) roundabout project. On August 9, 2018, a tractor-trailer travelling southbound on US-75 crashed into the roundabout. The trucks fuel tank was damaged and spilled about 70 gallons of diesel fuel. K-31 and US-75 traffic was reduced to one lane for about four hours after the crash.

== Major intersections ==
The entire route is in Osage County.

Location	mi	km	Destinations	Notes
Valley Brook Township	0.000	0.000	US-75 / K-31 – Lyndon, Carbondale	Western terminus; roundabout; road continues as K-31 north to Osage City
Junction Township	4.516	7.268	K-368 north – Pomona State Park	Southern terminus of K-368
Agency Township	9.490	15.273	K-68 – Quenemo, Pomona	Eastern terminus; road continues as K-68 east.
1.000 mi = 1.609 km; 1.000 km = 0.621 mi
