= Lincoln Township, Osage County, Kansas =

Township in Osage County, Kansas, U.S.

Lincoln Township
- Township
- Location within Osage County
- Coordinates: 38.485331°N 95.554679°W
- Country: United States
- State: Kansas
- County: Osage

Area
  - Total: 32.194 sq mi (83.38 km^{2})
  - Land: 32.021 sq mi (82.93 km^{2})
  - Water: 0.173 sq mi (0.45 km^{2}) 0.54%
- Elevation: 1,070 ft (330 m)

Population (2020)
  - Total: 145
  - Density: 4.53/sq mi (1.75/km^{2})
- Time zone: UTC-6 (CST)
  - Summer (DST): UTC-5 (CDT)
- Area code: 785
- GNIS feature ID: 479614

Lincoln Township is a township in Osage County, Kansas, United States. As of the 2020 census, its population was 145.

== Geography ==
Lincoln Township covers an area of 32.194 square miles (83.38 square kilometers). The Marais des Cygnes River flows through it.

=== Adjacent townships ===
- Agency Township, Osage County (north)
- Greenwood Township, Franklin County (northeast)
- Williamsburg Township, Franklin County (east)
- Rock Creek Township, Coffey County (south)
- Melvern Township, Osage County (west)

== Transportation ==
=== Major highways ===
- I-35
- US-50
- K-31
