= Valley Brook Township, Kansas =

Township in Osage County, Kansas, U.S.

Valley Brook Township
- Township
- Location within Osage County
- Coordinates: 38.614731°N 95.672314°W
- Country: United States
- State: Kansas
- County: Osage

Area
  - Total: 40.295 sq mi (104.36 km^{2})
  - Land: 40.17 sq mi (104.0 km^{2})
  - Water: 0.125 sq mi (0.32 km^{2}) 0.31%
- Elevation: 1,007 ft (307 m)

Population (2020)
  - Total: 1,492
  - Density: 37.14/sq mi (14.34/km^{2})
- Time zone: UTC-6 (CST)
  - Summer (DST): UTC-5 (CDT)
- Area code: 785
- GNIS feature ID: 479305

Valley Brook Township is a township in Osage County, Kansas, United States. As of the 2020 census, its population was 1,492.

== Geography ==
Valley Brook Township covers an area of 40.295 square miles (104.36 square kilometers).

=== Communities ===
- Lyndon

=== Adjacent townships ===
- Fairfax Township, Osage County (north)
- Junction Township, Osage County (northeast)
- Agency Township, Osage County (southeast)
- Melvern Township, Osage County (south)
- Olivet Township, Osage County (southwest)
- Superior Township, Osage County (northwest)

== Transportation ==
=== Major highways ===
- US-75
- K-31
- K-68
- K-268
