= Mission Creek Township, Kansas =

Township in Wabaunsee County, Kansas, U.S.

Mission Creek Township
- Township
- Location within Wabaunsee County
- Coordinates: 38.931901°N 96.041169°W
- Country: United States
- State: Kansas
- County: Wabaunsee
- Established: 1859

Government
  - Trustee: Chuck Kidd

Area
  - Total: 80.005 sq mi (207.21 km^{2})
  - Land: 79.718 sq mi (206.47 km^{2})
  - Water: 0.287 sq mi (0.74 km^{2}) 0.36%

Population (2020)
  - Total: 485
  - Density: 6.08/sq mi (2.35/km^{2})
- Time zone: UTC-6 (CST)
  - Summer (DST): UTC-5 (CDT)
- Area code: 785
- GNIS feature ID: 476774

Mission Creek Township is a township in Wabaunsee County, Kansas, United States. As of the 2020 census, its population was 485.

== History ==
Wabaunsee County was organized on March 25, 1859. The first townships were organized the same day, among them, Mission Creek Township. The first school in the township was built in 1859.

== Geography ==
Mission Creek Township covers an area of 80.005 square miles (207.21 km^{2}), 0.36% of it water. Mission Creek flows through it, as well as Massasoit Creek.

=== Communities ===
- Keene

=== Adjacent townships ===
Maple Hill Township, Wabaunsee County
Newbury Township, Wabaunsee County	northwest	north	northeast	Dover Township, Shawnee County
Mill Creek Township, Wabaunsee County	west	self	east	Auburn Township, Shawnee County
Wilmington Township, Wabaunsee County	southwest	south	southeast	Burlingame Township, Osage County
Plumb Township, Wabaunsee County

== Transportation ==
=== Major highways ===
- K-4

== Demographics ==
As of the 2020 census, the township had a population of 485, giving a population density of 6.08 people per square mile (2.35 people/km^{2}). The racial makeup of the township was 95.1% White, 0.4% Native American, 0.2% Asian, 0.2% Pacific Islander, and 4.1% from two or more races. Hispanics or Latinos of any race were 2.3% of the population.

The 2020–2024 American Community Survey estimated that the township contained 197 households and 233 housing units.
