= Clinton Township, Kansas =

Clinton Township
- Township
- Location in Douglas County
- Coordinates: 38°54′00″N 095°24′31″W
- Country: United States
- State: Kansas
- County: Douglas

Area
  - Total: 40.63 sq mi (105.22 km^{2})
  - Land: 30.71 sq mi (79.54 km^{2})
  - Water: 9.92 sq mi (25.68 km^{2}) 24.41%
- Elevation: 935 ft (285 m)

Population (2020)
  - Total: 626
  - Density: 20.4/sq mi (7.87/km^{2})
- GNIS feature ID: 0479495

Clinton Township is a township in Douglas County, Kansas, United States. As of the 2020 census, its population was 626.

== History ==
The township took its name from Clinton, Illinois.

== Geography ==
Clinton Township covers an area of 40.63 square miles (105.2 km^{2}) and contains no incorporated settlements. According to the USGS, it contains one cemetery, Clinton.

The stream of Elk Creek runs through this township.

== Adjacent townships ==
- Kanwaka Township, Douglas County (north)
- Wakarusa Township, Douglas County (east)
- Willow Springs Township, Douglas County (southeast)
- Marion Township, Douglas County (south)
- Elk Township, Osage County (southwest)
- Monmouth Township, Shawnee County (west)

== Communities ==
Although these towns may not be incorporated or populated, they are still placed on maps produced by the county.

- Clinton, located at 38°54′42″N 95°23′26″W

== Places of interest ==
- The Clinton Lake Museum, outside of Clinton near Bloomington Beach, features photographs and histories of small towns that used to be in the area. It also has an exhibit on the Underground Railroad.
- Saunder's Mound, in the Clinton Lake Overlook Park, was once a popular gathering spot for the former town of Sigil and was used for picnics and fireworks.
