= Fairfax Township, Kansas =

Township in Osage County, Kansas, U.S.

Fairfax Township
- Township
- Location within Osage County
- Coordinates: 38.717472°N 95.671274°W
- Country: United States
- State: Kansas
- County: Osage

Area
  - Total: 44.834 sq mi (116.12 km^{2})
  - Land: 43.315 sq mi (112.19 km^{2})
  - Water: 1.519 sq mi (3.93 km^{2}) 3.39%
- Elevation: 1,129 ft (344 m)

Population (2020)
  - Total: 610
  - Density: 14/sq mi (5.4/km^{2})
- Time zone: UTC-6 (CST)
  - Summer (DST): UTC-5 (CDT)
- Area code: 785
- GNIS feature ID: 479467

Fairfax Township is a township in Osage County, Kansas, United States. As of the 2020 census, its population was 610.

== Geography ==
Fairfax Township covers an area of 44.834 square miles (116.12 square kilometers). Part of Pomona Lake is located within the township.

=== Adjacent townships ===
- Ridgeway Township, Osage County (north)
- Elk Township, Osage County (northeast)
- Junction Township, Osage County (east)
- Valley Brook Township, Osage County (south)
- Superior Township, Osage County (southwest)
- Dragoon Township, Osage County (west)
- Scranton Township, Osage County (northwest)

== Transportation ==
=== Major highways ===
- US-75
