= Williamsport Township, Kansas =

Township in Shawnee County, Kansas, U.S.

Williamsport Township
- Township
- Location within Shawnee County
- Coordinates: 38.912°N 95.698°W
- Country: United States
- State: Kansas
- County: Shawnee
- Established: 1860
- Named for: Williamsport, Pennsylvania

Government
  - Township Trustee: Jay Marple

Area
  - Total: 39.979 sq mi (103.55 km^{2})
  - Land: 39.584 sq mi (102.52 km^{2})
  - Water: 0.395 sq mi (1.02 km^{2}) 0.99%

Population (2020)
  - Total: 4,244
  - Density: 107.2/sq mi (41.40/km^{2})
- Time zone: UTC-6 (CST)
  - Summer (DST): UTC-5 (CDT)
- Area code: 785
- GNIS feature ID: 479064

Williamsport Township is a township in Shawnee County, Kansas, United States. As of the 2020 census, its population was 4,244.

== History ==
Williamsport Township was organized on April 20, 1860 from part of Auburn Township. The first settler in what would become Williamsport Township was Rev. Robert Simerwell, coming from Mission Township, who settled there on August 13, 1854. It was organized by settlers from Williamsport, Pennsylvania. The first school in the township was built in 1857.

== Geography ==
Williamsport Township covers an area of 39.979 square miles (103.55 square kilometers). The Wakarusa River flows through it, as well as Lynn Creek, Burys Creek, Towhead Creek, Armstrong Branch, and Sixmile Creek. Two exclaves of the city of Topeka are completely surrounded by the township.

=== Communities ===
- Wakarusa
- part of Berryton

=== Adjacent townships ===
Topeka Township, Shawnee County
Mission Township, Shawnee County	northwest	north
Auburn Township, Shawnee County	west	self	east	Monmouth Township, Shawnee County
Scranton Township, Osage County	southwest	south
Ridgeway Township, Osage County

== Transportation ==
Most of Topeka Regional Airport lies within the township, including the Combat Air Museum.

=== Major highways ===
- I-335 / Kansas Turnpike
- US-75
