= Monmouth Township, Kansas =

Township in Shawnee County, Kansas, U.S.

Monmouth Township
- Township
- Location within Shawnee County
- Coordinates: 38°55′15″N 95°34′01″W
- Country: United States
- State: Kansas
- County: Shawnee
- Established: 1860

Government
  - Township Trustee: Gilda Singleton

Area
  - Total: 56.956 sq mi (147.52 km^{2})
  - Land: 56.424 sq mi (146.14 km^{2})
  - Water: 0.532 sq mi (1.38 km^{2}) 0.93%

Population (2020)
  - Total: 3,185
  - Density: 56.45/sq mi (21.79/km^{2})
- Time zone: UTC-6 (CST)
  - Summer (DST): UTC-5 (CDT)
- Area code: 785
- GNIS feature ID: 479055

Monmouth Township is a township in the southeast corner of Shawnee County, Kansas, United States. As of the 2020 census, its population was 3,185.

== History ==
Monmouth Township was created on April 20, 1860 after being separated from Tecumseh Township. The first settler in what would become Monmouth Township was Charles Matney from Virginia, who settled there on August 17, 1854.

Until the construction of Clinton Lake, the incorporated city of Richland was in the southeastern corner of the township. An attempt was made to relocate some of the business of Richland a mile and a half north to become Richland Corners, but when the site of the dam was moved downstream a few miles, Richland Corners was stranded too far from open water to benefit from the move. All the businesses eventually closed. Originally intended to be under a few feet of water, the townsite is now a true ghost town. One can drive a few of the streets and walk the cement slab floor of the elementary school. In addition to maintaining roads, the township authority tends to the cemeteries in the township.

== Geography ==
Monmouth Township covers an area of 56.956 square miles (147.52 square kilometers). The Wakarusa River flows through it, as well as Camp Creek, Burys Creek, Lynn Creek, Deer Creek, and Tecumseh Creek.

At the beginning of the 21st century it contained a post office, Berryton Elementary School (part of Shawnee Heights USD 450), and two churches: Berryton United Methodist and Berryton Baptist.

=== Communities ===
- part of Berryton
- part of Watson

=== Adjacent townships ===
Tecumseh Township, Shawnee County
Topeka Township, Shawnee County	northwest	north	northeast	Kanwaka Township, Douglas County
Williamsport Township, Shawnee County	west	self	east	Clinton Township, Douglas County
Ridgeway Township, Osage County	southwest	south	southeast	Marion Township, Douglas County
Elk Township, Osage County
