= Junction Township, Kansas =

Township in Osage County, Kansas, U.S.

Junction Township
- Township
- Location within Osage County
- Coordinates: 38.679996°N 95.562332°W
- Country: United States
- State: Kansas
- County: Osage

Area
  - Total: 49.822 sq mi (129.04 km^{2})
  - Land: 49.784 sq mi (128.94 km^{2})
  - Water: 0.038 sq mi (0.098 km^{2}) 0.08%
- Elevation: 1,037 ft (316 m)

Population (2020)
  - Total: 1,207
  - Density: 24.24/sq mi (9.361/km^{2})
- Time zone: UTC-6 (CST)
  - Summer (DST): UTC-5 (CDT)
- Area code: 785
- GNIS feature ID: 479313

Junction Township is a township in Osage County, Kansas, United States. As of the 2020 census, its population was 1,207.

== Geography ==
Junction Township covers an area of 49.822 square miles (129.04 square kilometers). Pomona State Park and most of Pomona Lake are located within the township.

=== Communities ===
- Vassar

=== Adjacent townships ===
- Elk Township, Osage County (north)
- Marion Township, Douglas County (northeast)
- Appanoose Township, Franklin County (east)
- Pomona Township, Franklin County (southeast)
- Agency Township, Osage County (south)
- Valley Brook Township, Osage County (southwest)
- Fairfax Township, Osage County (west)

== Transportation ==
=== Major highways ===
- K-268
