= K-68 (Kansas highway) =

State highway in Kansas, U.S.

K-68
- K-68 highlighted in red

Route information
- Maintained by KDOT and the city of Ottawa
- Length: 61.517 mi (99.002 km)
- Existed: 1929–present

Major junctions
- West end: US-75 / K-31 near Lyndon
- I-35 / US-59 / US-50 in Ottawa; US-169 / K-7 north of Paola; US-69 in Louisburg
- East end: Route 2 at the Missouri state line in West Line, MO

Location
- Country: United States
- State: Kansas
- Counties: Miami, Franklin, Osage

Highway system
- Kansas State Highway System; Interstate; US; State; Spurs
← K-67	→ US-69

K-68 is a 61.517-mile-long (99.002 km) east–west state highway in the U.S. State of Kansas. K-68's western terminus is at U.S. Route 75 (US-75) and K-31 south of Lyndon and the eastern terminus is a continuation as Missouri Route 2 at the Missouri state line.

== Route description ==
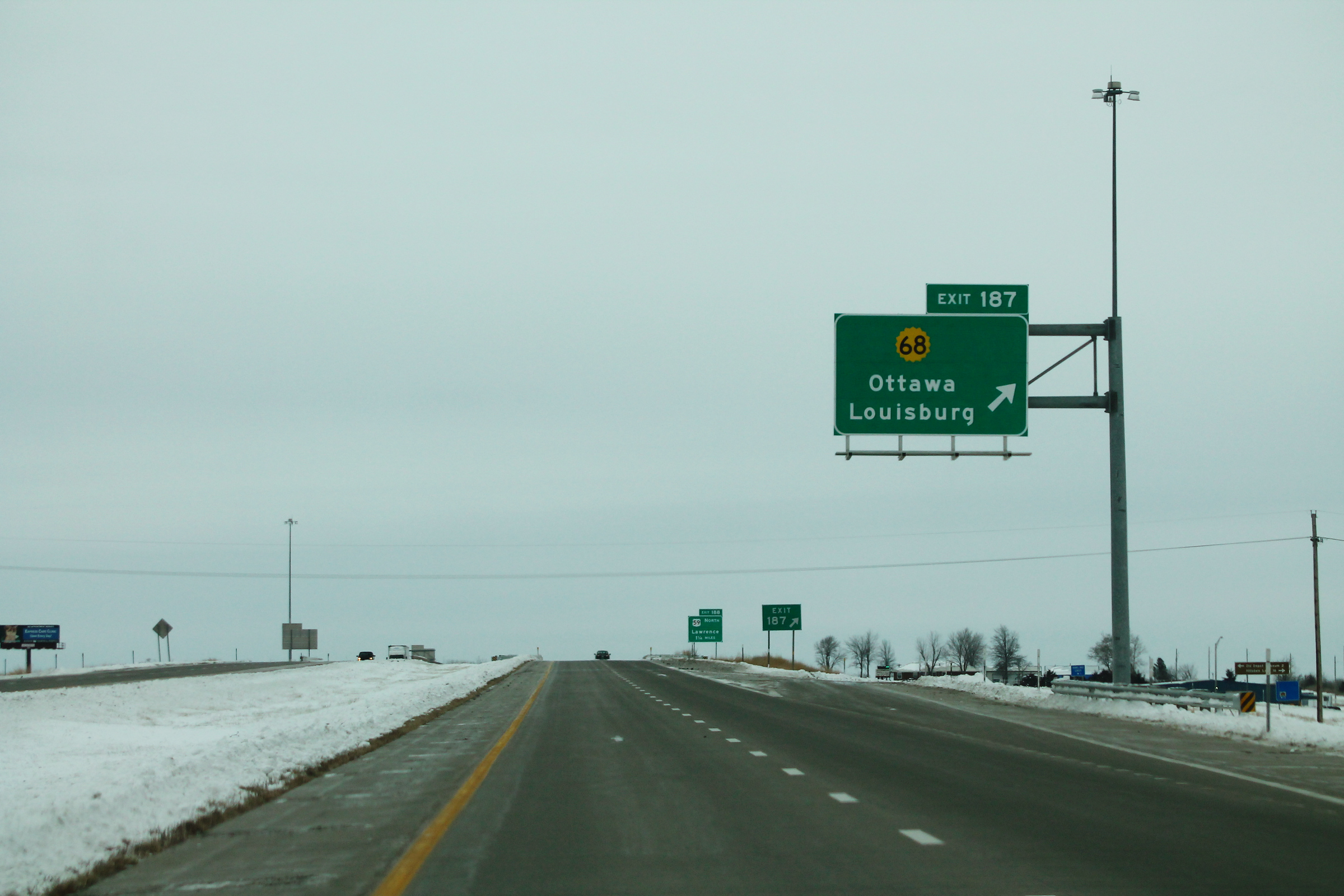
I-35 exit for K-68

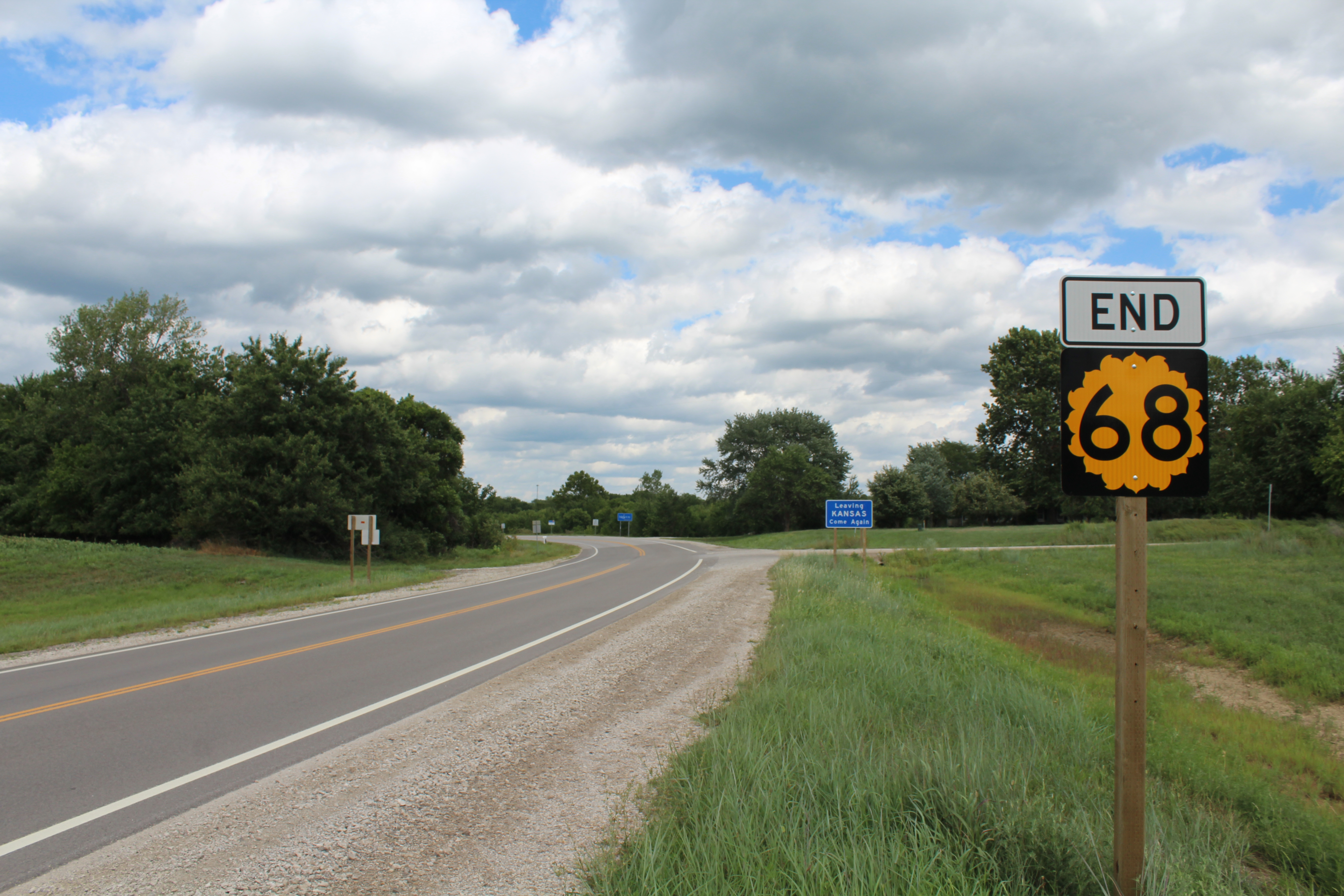
The eastern terminus of K-68

Beginning at US-75 and K-31 about a mile south of Lyndon. From here it heads east then reaches Quenemo, where it turns north and intersects K-268. Next it goes through Pomona. It continues east crossing the Marais des Cygnes River then turns northeastward and crosses the former route of US-59 near downtown Ottawa. As K-68 enters Ottawa, it intersects with I-35, US-59 and US-50 near the Walmart Distribution Center. Four miles west of Louisburg, K-68 intersects with US-169 and K-7, it also provides an end terminus with K-33 in Franklin County. It passes through Louisburg where it intersects with US-69. After passing Louisburg it reaches its eastern terminus at Missouri Route 2.

The Kansas Department of Transportation (KDOT) tracks the traffic levels on its highways, and in 2018, they determined that on average the traffic varied from 270 vehicles per day slightly west of Quenemo to 12,200 vehicles per day slightly east of US-69. The next highest volume of traffic was 8,820 vehicles per day slightly west of I-35 and 7,420 vehicles per day slightly west of US-69. K-68 is not included in the National Highway System. The National Highway System is a system of highways important to the nation's defense, economy, and mobility. K-68 does connect to the National Highway System at its western terminus at US-75, at its intersection with I-35 / US-50 / US-59, at its intersection with US-169 / K-7, and at its intersection with US-69. The section of K-68 in Ottawa from the west city limit to the interchange with I-35 is maintained by the city.

== History ==
K-68 was first designated a state highway in 1929 and went from US-73W and US-50S in Ottawa eastward to US-73E in Louisburg. By April 1936, US-50S was realigned onto K-33 from south of Ottawa to K-31 east of Waverly and K-68 was extended west on the old US-50S alignment from Ottawa to US-75 by Lyndon. At that time K-33 was also truncated to end at K-68 east of Ottawa. Sometime between April 1933 and April 1936 US-73W was renumbered to US-59 and US-73E was renumbered to US-69. In a May 26, 1937 resolution K-68 was extended further east from US-69 to the Missouri border, which was first approved in a March 29, 1937 meeting. In a March 12, 1963 resolution, a 9.997 miles (16.089 km) section of K-68 was realigned northwest of Paola to eliminate two curves. Then in a January 12, 1965 resolution, a 5.949 miles (9.574 km) section of K-68 was realigned northeast of Paola to meet the section realigned in the March 12, 1963 resolution, which eliminated the overlap with US-169. Originally US-169 and K-7 ran together through Paola then in a June 12, 1969 resolution, US-169 and K-7 was realigned to the east of Paola and K-68's junction with the two highways was moved roughly 1 mile (1.6 km) to the east. Originally US-69 through Louisburg then in an April 6, 1976 resolution, US-69 was realigned to the west of Louisburg and K-68's junction with the two highways was moved approximately 1 mile (1.6 km) to the west. US-50 Business (US-50 Bus.) originally overlapped K-68 in Ottawa, then in a November 6, 2000 resolution the US-50 Bus. designation was removed.

On May 21, 2019, the highway was closed north of Quenemo, due to flooding from Salt Creek.

== Major intersections ==
County	Location	mi	km	Destinations	Notes
Osage	Valley Brook Township	0.000	0.000	US-75 / K-31 – Burlington, Lyndon, Topeka	Western terminus; road continues as 261st Street
Osage	Agency Township	11.412	18.366	K-268 west – Osage City	Eastern terminus of K-268
Franklin	Ottawa	25.775	41.481	Old Depot Museum, Forest Park	Partial interchange; no eastbound entrance
Franklin	Ottawa	27.926	44.943	I-35 / US-59 / US-50 – Kansas City, Wichita	I-35 exit 187; diamond interchange
Franklin	Peoria Township	35.956	57.866	K-33 north – Wellsville	Southern terminus of K-33
Miami	Marysville Township	49.364	79.444	US-169 / K-7 – Olathe, Paola	Diamond interchange
Miami	Louisburg	57.000	91.733	US-69 – Kansas City, Ft. Scott	Diamond interchange
Miami	Wea Township	61.517	99.002	Route 2 east / State Line Road south	Continuation into Missouri as Rte. 2
1.000 mi = 1.609 km; 1.000 km = 0.621 mi: Incomplete access

== See also ==
- List of Kansas numbered highways
