= Ridgeway Township, Kansas =

Township in Osage County, Kansas, U.S.

Ridgeway Township
- Township
- Location within Osage County
- Coordinates: 38.815369°N 95.673872°W
- Country: United States
- State: Kansas
- County: Osage

Area
  - Total: 42.413 sq mi (109.85 km^{2})
  - Land: 41.703 sq mi (108.01 km^{2})
  - Water: 0.71 sq mi (1.8 km^{2}) 1.67%
- Elevation: 1,135 ft (346 m)

Population (2020)
  - Total: 2,376
  - Density: 56.97/sq mi (22.00/km^{2})
- Time zone: UTC-6 (CST)
  - Summer (DST): UTC-5 (CDT)
- Area code: 785
- GNIS feature ID: 479460

Ridgeway Township is a township in Osage County, Kansas, United States. As of the 2020 census, its population was 2,376.

== Geography ==
Ridgeway Township covers an area of 42.413 square miles (109.85 square kilometers).

=== Communities ===
- Carbondale

=== Adjacent townships ===
- Monmouth Township, Shawnee County (northeast)
- Elk Township, Osage County (east)
- Fairfax Township, Osage County (south)
- Scranton Township, Osage County (west)
- Williamsport Township, Shawnee County (northwest)

== Transportation ==
=== Major highways ===
- US-56
- US-75
