= Superior Township, Osage County, Kansas =

Township in Osage County, Kansas, U.S.

Superior Township
- Township
- Location within Osage County
- Coordinates: 38.64916°N 95.778731°W
- Country: United States
- State: Kansas
- County: Osage

Area
  - Total: 36.226 sq mi (93.82 km^{2})
  - Land: 36.15 sq mi (93.6 km^{2})
  - Water: 0.076 sq mi (0.20 km^{2}) 0.21%
- Elevation: 1,096 ft (334 m)

Population (2020)
  - Total: 245
  - Density: 6.78/sq mi (2.62/km^{2})
- Time zone: UTC-6 (CST)
  - Summer (DST): UTC-5 (CDT)
- Area code: 785
- GNIS feature ID: 479304

Superior Township is a township in Osage County, Kansas, United States. As of the 2020 census, its population was 245.

== Geography ==
Superior Township covers an area of 36.226 square miles (93.82 square kilometers).

=== Adjacent townships ===
- Dragoon Township, Osage County (north)
- Fairfax Township, Osage County (northeast)
- Valley Brook Township, Osage County (east)
- Olivet Township, Osage County (south)
- Barclay Township, Osage County (southwest)
- Grant Township, Osage County (west)

== Transportation ==
=== Major highways ===
- US-56
- K-31
