= K-38 (Kansas highway) =

Former state highway in Kansas, United States

K-38
- K-38 highlighted in red

Route information
- Maintained by KDOT
- Length: 12.990 mi (20.905 km)
- Existed: January 7, 1937–November 21, 1997

Major junctions
- West end: K-15 north of Dexter
- East end: Ranch Road and Road 2 southwest of Grenola

Location
- Country: United States
- State: Kansas
- Counties: Chautauqua, Cowley

Highway system
- Kansas State Highway System; Interstate; US; State; Spurs
← K-37	→ K-38

K-38 was a 12.9-mile-long (20.8 km) Kansas state highway that started at K-15 north of Dexter in rural Cowley County and ended in Chautauqua County at an intersection with a county road. There were no towns or state facilities served by the road. K-38 was never completely paved; the last couple of miles of the road were gravel.

K-38 was first designated a state highway on January 7, 1937. K-38 was decommissioned in November 1997. It is now a county road for both Cowley (CR-28) and Chautauqua (Ranch Road).

== Route description ==
K-38 began at a wye intersection with K-15, which headed west toward Winfield and south toward Dexter, in central Cowley County. The highway headed east as a low-grade bituminous surface road with crossings of Grouse Creek, a tributary of the Arkansas River, and Bullington Creek. K-38 veered away from the east–west section line around its crossing of Otter Creek and returned before the route reached the Cowley–Chautauqua county line. The highway became a gravel road on entering Chautauqua County. K-38 continued east 2 miles (3.2 km) to its end at a junction of section line roads, east–west Ranch Road and north–south Road 2, near the Caney River in northwestern Chautauqua County; the nearest city to the highway's terminus is Grenola in southwestern Elk County, and the closest city in the county was Cedar Vale to the south.

The Kansas Department of Transportation (KDOT) tracks the traffic levels on its highways, and in 1997, they determined that on average the traffic varied from 90 vehicles near the eastern terminus to 500 vehicles near the western terminus. K-38 was not included in the National Highway System, a system of highways important to the nation's defense, economy, and mobility.

== History ==
K-38 was first designated as a state highway by KDOT on January 7, 1937. At that time it extended from K-15 east to the county maintained road that ran between Cedarvale and Grenola. K-38 was decommissioned on November 21, 1997. It is now a county road for both Cowley County (CR-28) and Chautauqua County (Ranch Road).

== Major intersections ==
County	Location	mi	km	Destinations	Notes
Cowley		0.000	0.000	K-15 – Dexter, Winfield	Western terminus
Chautauqua		12.990	20.905	Road 2 / Ranch Road east	Eastern terminus
1.000 mi = 1.609 km; 1.000 km = 0.621 mi
