= Marion Township, Douglas County, Kansas =

Marion Township
- Township
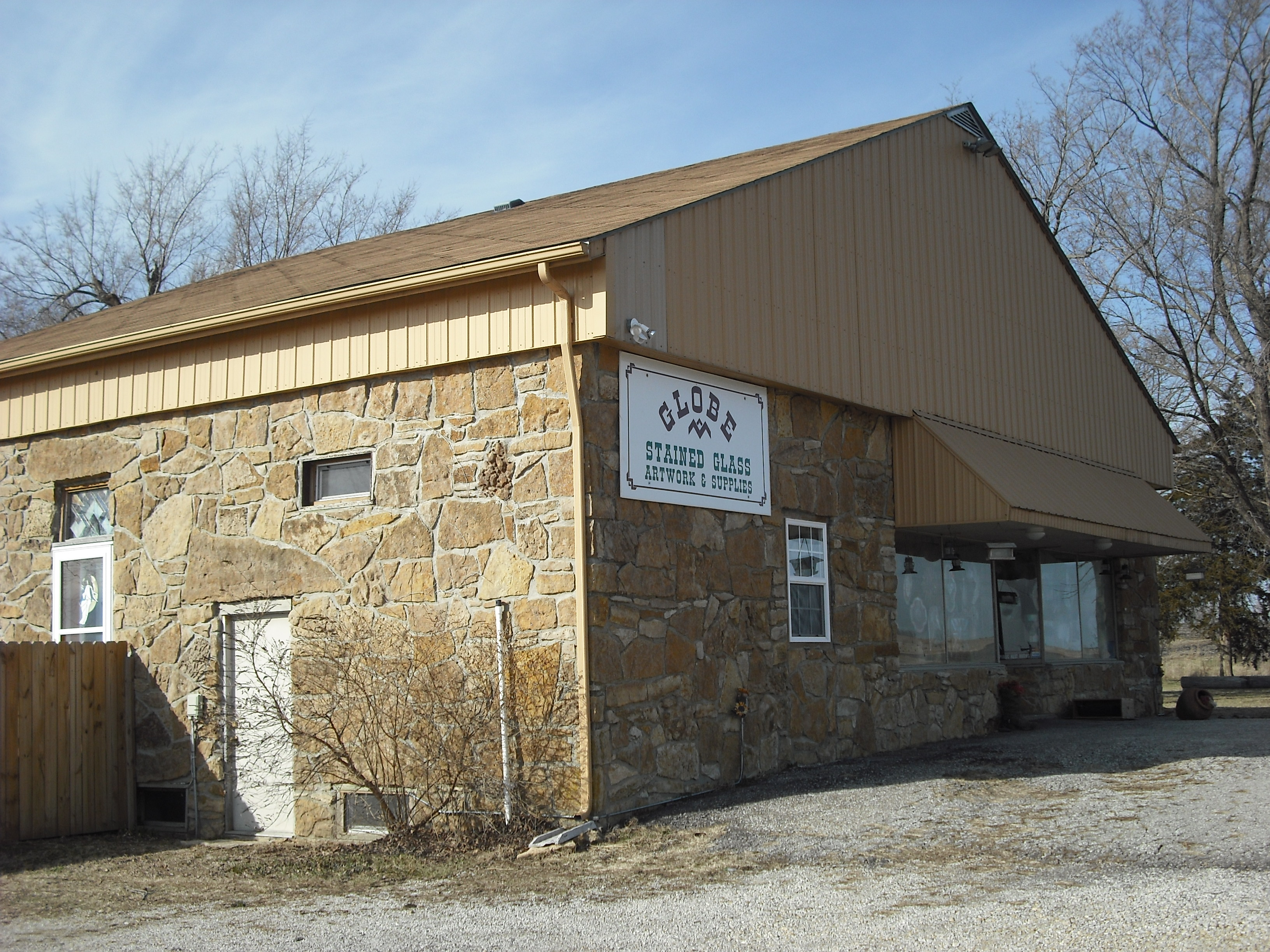
- Globe Glass Works in Globe (2009)

- Location in Douglas County
- Coordinates: 38°48′20″N 095°25′41″W
- Country: United States
- State: Kansas
- County: Douglas

Area
  - Total: 71.93 sq mi (186.29 km^{2})
  - Land: 71.55 sq mi (185.32 km^{2})
  - Water: 0.37 sq mi (0.96 km^{2}) 0.52%
- Elevation: 1,099 ft (335 m)

Population (2020)
  - Total: 845
  - Density: 11.8/sq mi (4.56/km^{2})
- GNIS feature ID: 0479476

Marion Township is a township in Douglas County, Kansas, United States. As of the 2020 census, its population was 845.

== History ==
It was named after the former town of Marion which in turn was named after Francis Marion.

== Geography ==
Marion Township covers an area of 71.93 square miles (186.3 km^{2}) and contains no incorporated settlements. According to the USGS, it contains five cemeteries: Appanoose, Colyer, Dodder, Rock Creek and Twin Mound.

== Adjacent townships ==
- Clinton Township, Douglas County (north)
- Willow Springs, Douglas County (east)
- Centropolis Township, Franklin County (southeast)
- Appanoose Township, Franklin County (south)
- Junction Township, Osage County (southwest)
- Elk Township, Osage County (west)

== Communities ==
Although these towns may not be incorporated or populated, they are still placed on maps produced by the county.

- Globe, located at 38°46′00″N 95°23′58″W
- Lone Star, located at 38°51′59″N 95°21′16″W
- Twin Mound, located at 38°51′32″N 95°28′53″W

== Transportation ==
=== Major highway ===
- U.S. Highway 56

== Places of interest ==
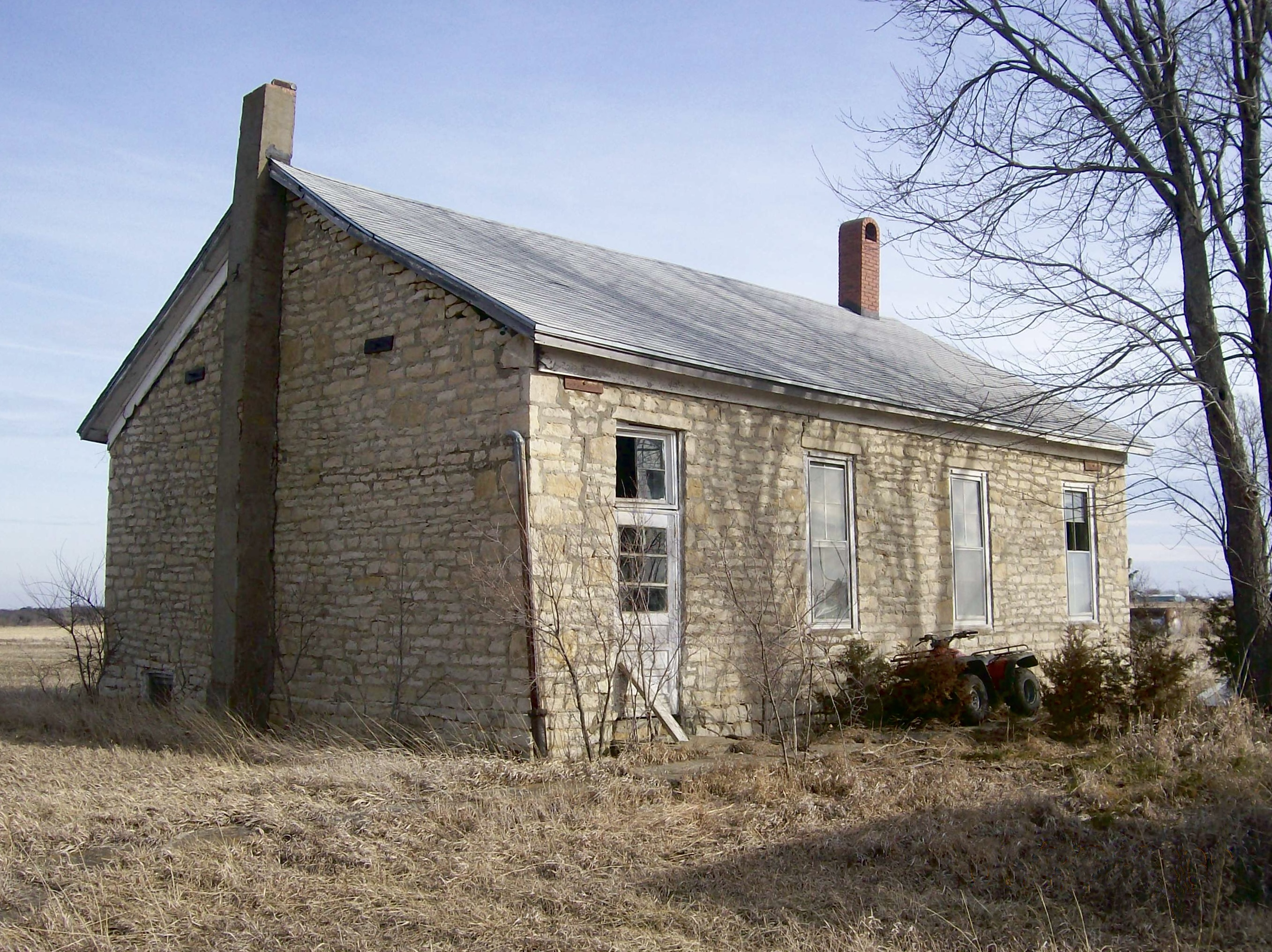
Twin Mound School in 2008.

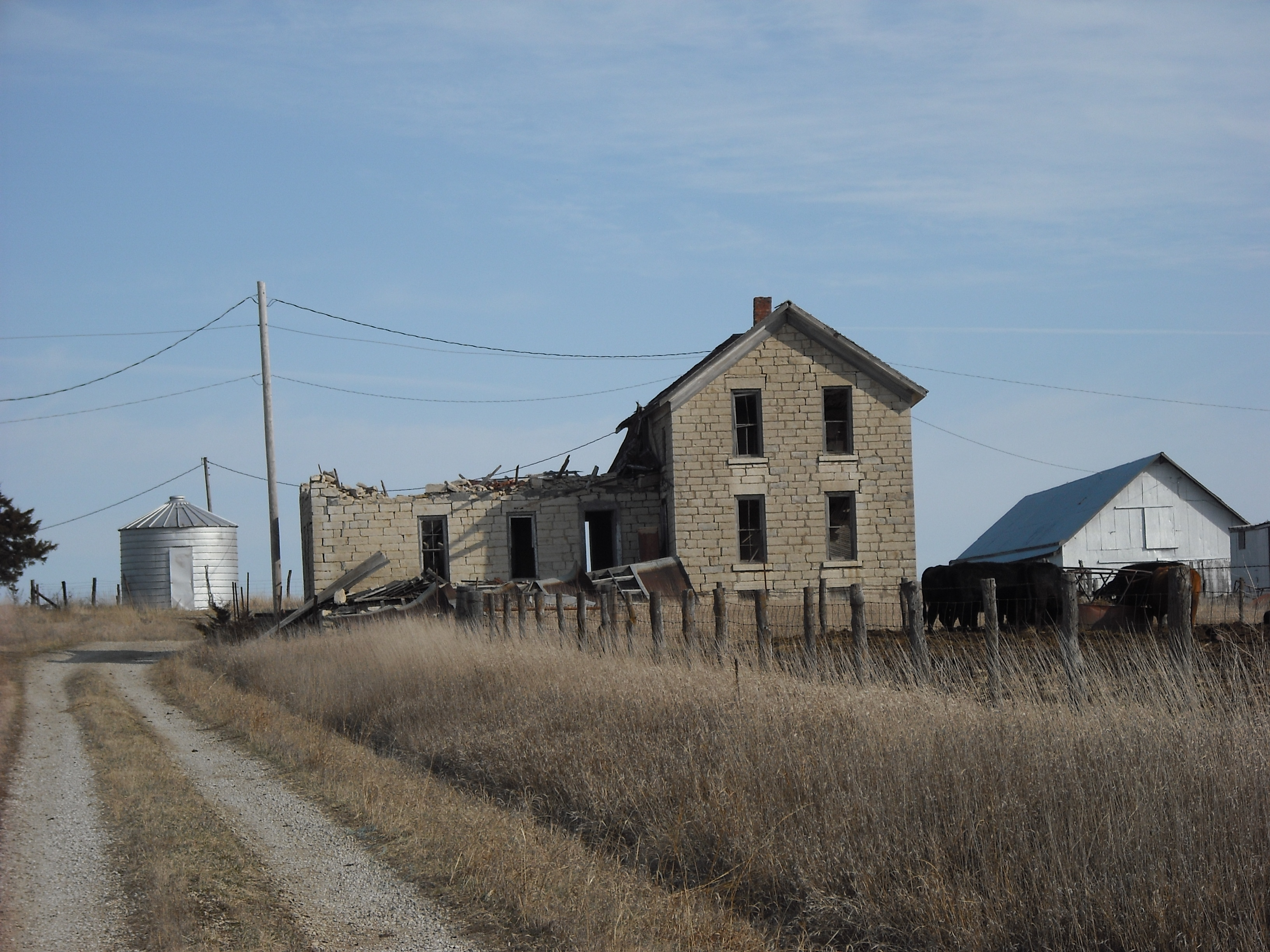
Simmon's Stage Station in 2009.

- Lone Star Lake, approximately four and one-half miles south of Clinton Lake offers boating, fishing, camping and swimming during certain times of the year.
- Simmons Point Station, an old stone house along the Santa Fe Trail that served as a resting place and way station.
- Townsite of Marion. Located along U.S. Highway 56, the town was named for Francis Marion and was known as both Marion and Globe.
- Townsite of Baden, located one mile (1.6 km) east of the Osage County line.
- Twin Mound School, one of the best preserved one-room schoolhouses in the county and the last one to be consolidated, in 1966.
