= Dragoon Township, Kansas =

Township in Osage County, Kansas, U.S.

Dragoon Township
- Township
- Location within Osage County
- Coordinates: 38.717052°N 95.838695°W
- Country: United States
- State: Kansas
- County: Osage

Area
  - Total: 36.254 sq mi (93.90 km^{2})
  - Land: 36.247 sq mi (93.88 km^{2})
  - Water: 0.007 sq mi (0.018 km^{2}) 0.02%
- Elevation: 1,063 ft (324 m)

Population (2020)
  - Total: 199
  - Density: 5.49/sq mi (2.12/km^{2})
- Time zone: UTC-6 (CST)
  - Summer (DST): UTC-5 (CDT)
- Area code: 785
- GNIS feature ID: 479303

Dragoon Township is a township in Osage County, Kansas, United States. As of the 2020 census, its population was 199.

== Geography ==
Dragoon Township covers an area of 36.254 square miles (93.90 square kilometers).

=== Adjacent townships ===
- Burlingame Township, Osage County (north)
- Scranton Township, Osage County (northeast)
- Fairfax Township, Osage County (east)
- Superior Township, Osage County (southeast)
- Grant Township, Osage County (southwest)
- Waterloo Township, Lyon County (west)
- Plumb Township, Wabaunsee County (northwest)

== Transportation ==
=== Major highways ===
- US-56
