= BETO Junction =

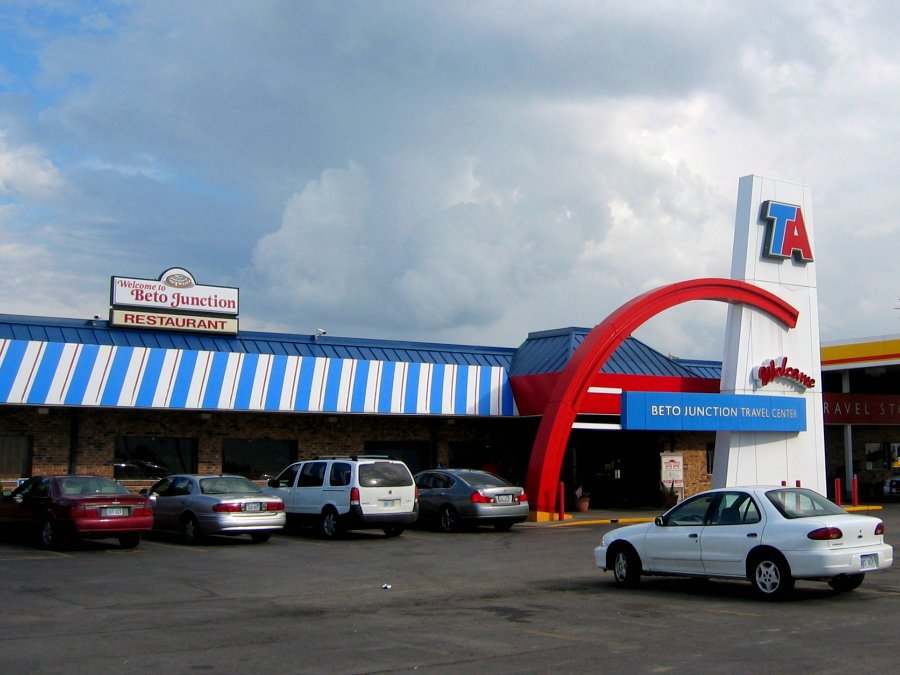
- Industry: Retail (Convenience stores)
- Headquarters: Coffey County, Kansas, United States
- Services: Fuel; Diner food Convenience store

BETO Junction Travel Plaza is a truck stop located at the intersection of Interstate 35 (I-35) and U.S. Highway 75 (US 75) in Coffey County, Kansas, 12 miles (19 km) north of the Wolf Creek Generating Station. BETO refers to the four closest major cities: Burlington, Emporia, Topeka, and Ottawa. The truck stop was described on air by Paul Harvey as "right out in the middle of nothing".

The truck stop and travel plaza is a popular stop for long-haul truck drivers and vacationers on road trips through the area. In 1994, the truck stop was so popular it was included on the Kansas state map after having been previously removed from the map in 1993. In 1996, the restaurant, originally opened in 1976, was noted as the nation's best truck stop diner by The Guide to America’s Best Truck Stop Diners. In the same guide that year, identical twin sister servers at the restaurant were voted as having the "most outrageous" personalities.
