= K-214 (Kansas highway) =

State highway in Kansas, U.S.

K-214
- K-214 highlighted in red

Route information
- Maintained by KDOT
- Length: 1.967 mi (3.166 km)
- Existed: December 13, 1961–present

Major junctions
- South end: US-75 north of Topeka
- North end: US-75 north of Topeka

Location
- Country: United States
- State: Kansas
- Counties: Jackson

Highway system
- Kansas State Highway System; Interstate; US; State; Spurs
← K-213	→ K-215

K-214 is a 1.967-mile-long (3.166 km) north–south state highway located entirely within Jackson County in the U.S. state of Kansas. K-214's southern and northern termini is at U.S. Route 75 (US-75) north of Topeka and west of Hoyt. US-75 originally passed directly through Hoyt. K-214 was first designated a state highway on December 13, 1961, to connect Hoyt to a new alignment of US-75, that was built to the west of the city.

== Route description ==
K-214 southern terminus is at an intersection with US-75 roughly 13 miles (21 km) north of Topeka. The highway travels east for 0.5 miles (0.80 km) and intersects West First Street, also known as Rural Secondary 318 (RS-318), at the Hoyt city limits. At this point it turns north and travels approximately 0.2 miles (0.32 km) to an intersection with West Fourth Street, the former routing of US-75. It then continues north for about 0.8 miles (1.3 km), curves to the west and intersects 118th Road. K-214 continues west for roughly 0.5 miles (0.80 km) and reaches its northern terminus back at US-75.

The route is maintained by Kansas Department of Transportation (KDOT), which is responsible for constructing and maintaining highways in the state. As part of this role, KDOT regularly surveys traffic on their highways. These surveys are most often presented in the form of annual average daily traffic, which is a measurement of the number of vehicles that use a highway during an average day of the year. In 2024, KDOT calculated that on average there was a total of 825 vehicles per day near the northern terminus, and 1975 vehicles per day near the southern terminus. K-214 is not included in the National Highway System. The National Highway System is a system of highways important to the nation's defense, economy, and mobility. K-214 does connect to the National Highway System at each end.

== History ==
=== Early roads ===
Before state highways were numbered in Kansas there were Auto trails, which were an informal network of marked routes that existed in the United States and Canada in the early part of the 20th century. The section of K-214 that runs north–south through Hoyt was part of the Capitol Route and Omaha–Topeka Trail.

=== Establishment ===
Originally US-75 entered the city of Hoyt from the south on Eastman Avenue. It then curved west onto Fourth Street. US-75 then turned north onto current K-214, which it followed to current US-75. In a resolution passed on December 13, 1961, US-75 was approved to be realigned between Topeka and Hoyt . On October 2, 1965, the American Association of State Highway Officials (AASHO) approved the relocation of US-75. At that time, K-214 was created to link Hoyt to the new US-75 built west of the city.

== Major intersections ==
The entire route is in Jackson County.

Location	mi	km	Destinations	Notes
Douglas Township	0.000	0.000	US-75 – Topeka, Holton	Southern terminus
Douglas Township	1.967	3.166	US-75 – Topeka, Holton	Northern terminus
1.000 mi = 1.609 km; 1.000 km = 0.621 mi
