= Peterton, Kansas =

Unincorporated community in Kansas, U.S.

Coordinates: 38°40′25″N 95°49′01″W

Peterton is an unincorporated community in Osage County, Kansas, United States.

== History ==
A post office was opened in Peterton in 1876, and remained in operation until it was discontinued in 1904.
