= Scranton Township, Kansas =

Township in Osage County, Kansas, U.S.

Scranton Township
- Township
- Location within Osage County
- Coordinates: 38.802717°N 95.757029°W
- Country: United States
- State: Kansas
- County: Osage

Area
  - Total: 35.829 sq mi (92.80 km^{2})
  - Land: 35.592 sq mi (92.18 km^{2})
  - Water: 0.237 sq mi (0.61 km^{2}) 0.66%
- Elevation: 1,129 ft (344 m)

Population (2020)
  - Total: 1,133
  - Density: 31.83/sq mi (12.29/km^{2})
- Time zone: UTC-6 (CST)
  - Summer (DST): UTC-5 (CDT)
- Area code: 785
- GNIS feature ID: 479447

Scranton Township is a township in Osage County, Kansas, United States. As of the 2020 census, its population was 1,133.

== Geography ==
Scranton Township covers an area of 35.829 square miles (92.80 square kilometers).

=== Communities ===
- Scranton

=== Adjacent townships ===
- Williamsport Township, Shawnee County (northeast)
- Ridgeway Township, Osage County (east)
- Fairfax Township, Osage County (southeast)
- Dragoon Township, Osage County (south)
- Burlingame Township, Osage County (west)
- Auburn Township, Shawnee County (northwest)

== Transportation ==
=== Major highways ===
- US-56
