= U.S. Route 50 in Kansas =

Segment of American highway

U.S. Highway 50
- US-50 highlighted in red

Route information
- Maintained by KDOT, and the cities of Cimarron, Dodge City and Emporia
- Length: 447.93 mi (720.87 km)
- Existed: 1927–present

Major junctions
- West end: US 50 / US 400 at the Colorado state line in Coolidge
- US-83 in Garden City; US-400 in Dodge City; US-56 from Dodge City to Kinsley; US-281 near St. John; I-135 / US-81 / K-15 in Newton; I-35 / I-335 / Kansas Turnpike in Emporia; US-59 in Ottawa; US-169 / K-7 in Olathe; I-35 / I-435 / US-56 / US-169 in Lenexa; US-69 in Overland Park
- East end: I-435 / US 50 at State Line Road between Leawood and Kansas City, MO

Location
- Country: United States
- State: Kansas
- Counties: Hamilton, Kearny, Finney, Gray, Ford, Edwards, Stafford, Reno, Harvey, Marion, Chase, Lyon, Coffey, Osage, Franklin, Miami, Johnson

Highway system
- United States Numbered Highway System; List; Special; Divided; Kansas State Highway System; Interstate; US; State; Spurs
← K-49	→ K-51

U.S. Route 50 (US-50) is a major east–west route of the U.S. Highway system, stretching just over 3,000 miles (4,800 km) from Interstate 80 (I-80) in West Sacramento, California, to Maryland Route 528 (MD 528) in Ocean City, Maryland, on the Atlantic Ocean. In the U.S. state of Kansas, US-50 is a main east–west highway serving the southwestern, central and northeastern parts of the state. Kansas City is the only metropolitan area US-50 serves in the state, but the highway does serve several other large cities in Kansas such as (from west to east) Garden City, Dodge City, Hutchinson, Newton and Emporia.

US-50 was established in Kansas by 1927, and at that time split into two branch routes in Kansas. The US-50 split began in Garden City and ended slightly west of Baldwin City. In Garden City, the split began at Kansas Avenue and Main Street. US-50N continued east on Kansas Ave. and went through Jetmore, Larned, Great Bend, Lyons, McPherson and Baldwin City. US-50S ran along current US-50. The routes rejoined near what is now the intersection of US-56 and K-33. US-50N was replaced by US-156 from Garden City to Great Bend and by US-56 the rest of the way. US-156 is now known as K-156. The split was removed during the late 1950s.

== Route description ==
US-50 enters the state running concurrently with US-400, which joins US-50 at Granada, Colorado. The first town it runs through is Coolidge. Syracuse is the first county seat (Hamilton County). In western Kansas, US-50 parallels the Arkansas River.

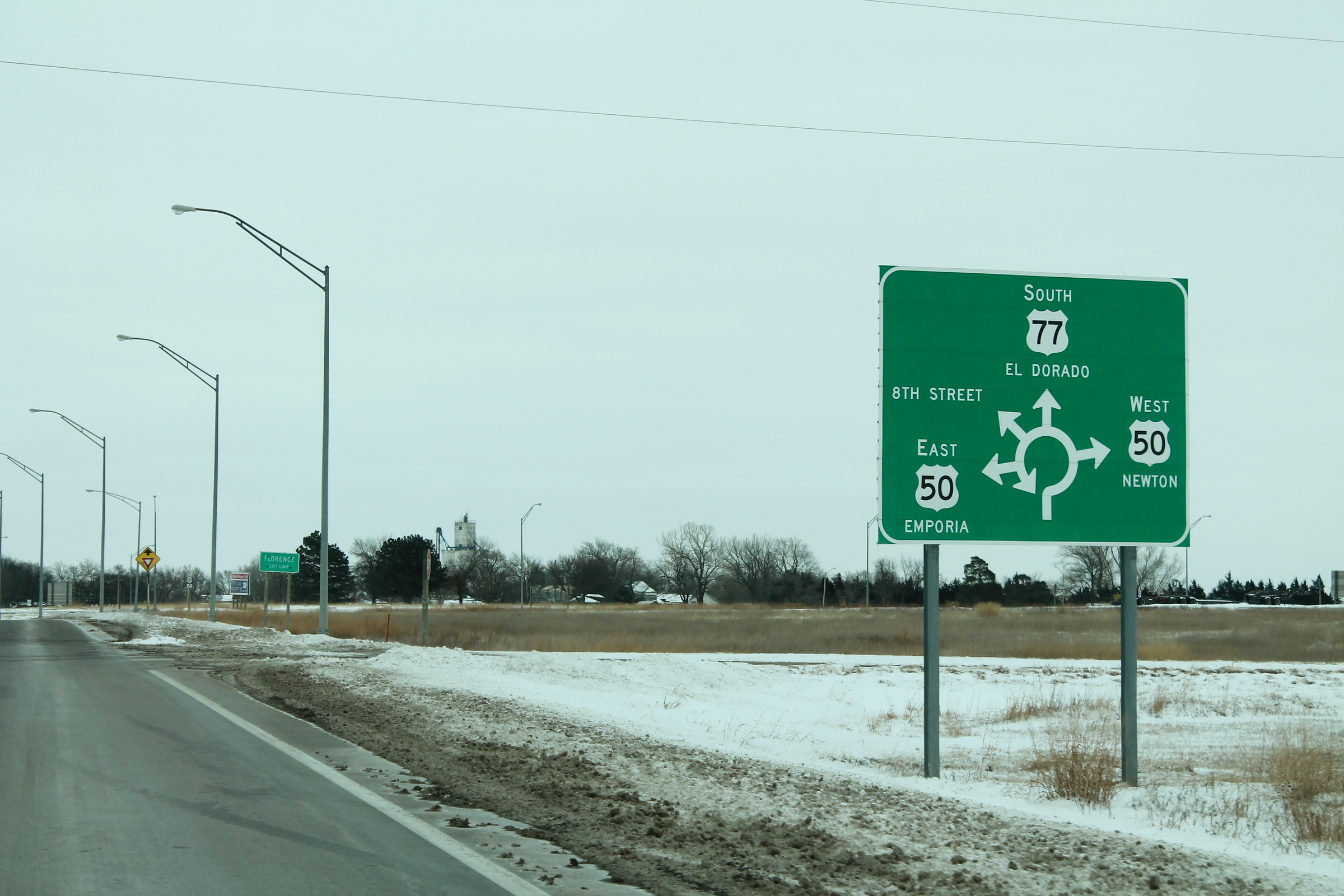
US-50 at its junction with US-77

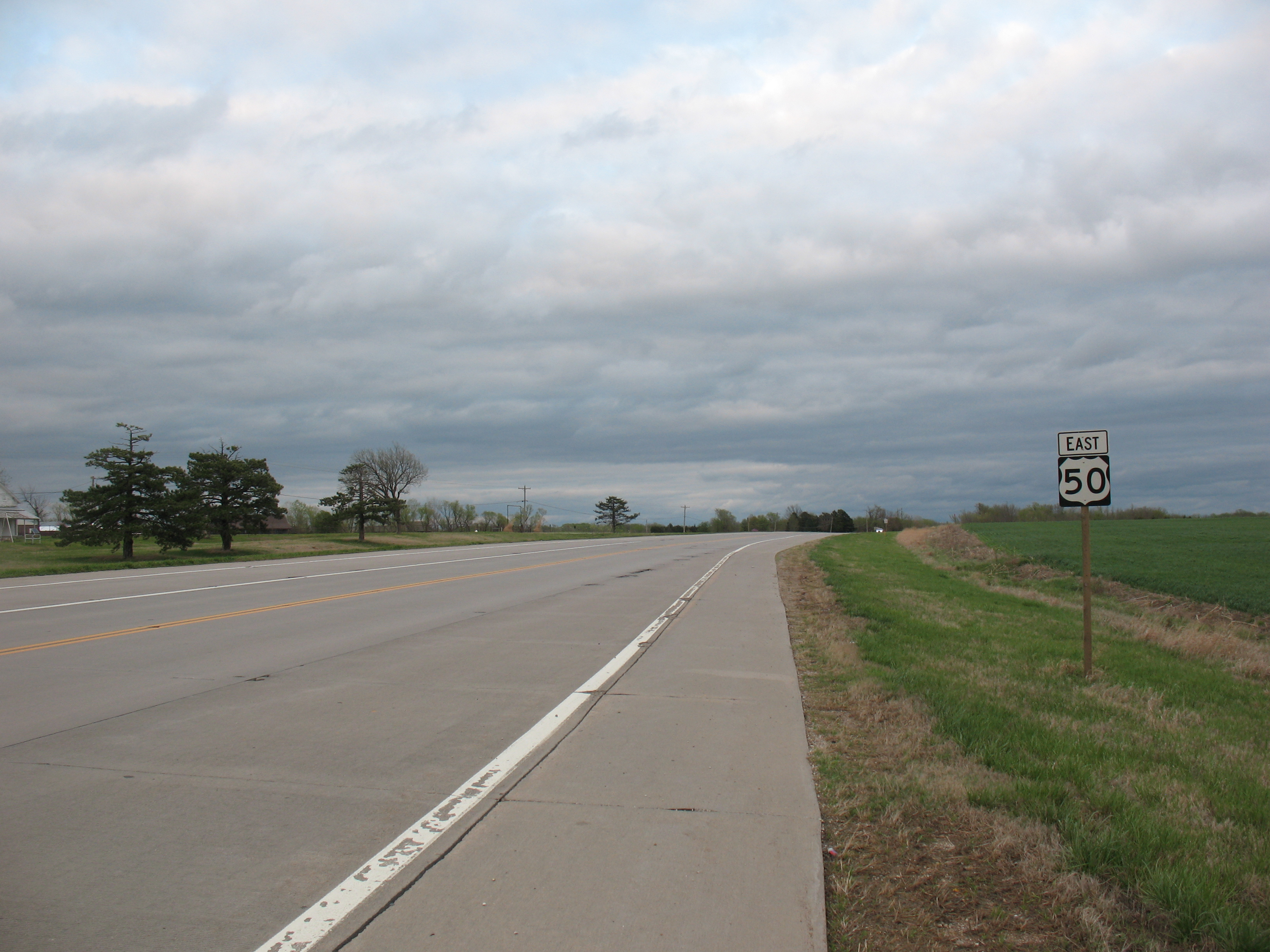
US 50 Eastbound west of Emporia

US-50 then enters Kearny County and passes through the towns of Lakin and Deerfield before entering Finney County. West of the Old US-50 and Big Lowe Road overpass in Holcomb, US-50 splits into four lanes and the speed limit increases to 70 MPH until east of the intersection with US-83 in Garden City. The highway then tapers back into two lanes at the 3rd Street intersection and remains so until the intersection with Bus-50 south of town. US-50 then passes through the towns of Ingalls, Cimarron, Dodge City, Kinsley, and Hutchinson before it heads to Newton. In Newton, US-50 joins I-135 for a short time before it angles northeast to Emporia, another meat-packing town as well as the home of Emporia State University. US-50 then joins I-35 and it overlaps that interstate for most of the rest of the way in Kansas.

US-50, along with I-35, then passes through a place known as "BETO Junction," which is where it meets US-75, north of Burlington. The letters in the acronym stand for Burlington, Emporia, Topeka and Ottawa, which are the cities to the south, west, north and east, respectively.

From there, US-50 passes through Olathe and meets I-435 in Lenexa. At this point. US-50 leaves I-35 and joins I-435 for the rest of its trip in Kansas.

The entire 1.369 miles (2 km) section of US-50 in Cimarron is maintained by the city. The entire 1.662 section within Dodge City is maintained by the city. The section in Emporia from Graphic Arts Road to the east city limit is maintained by the city.

== History ==
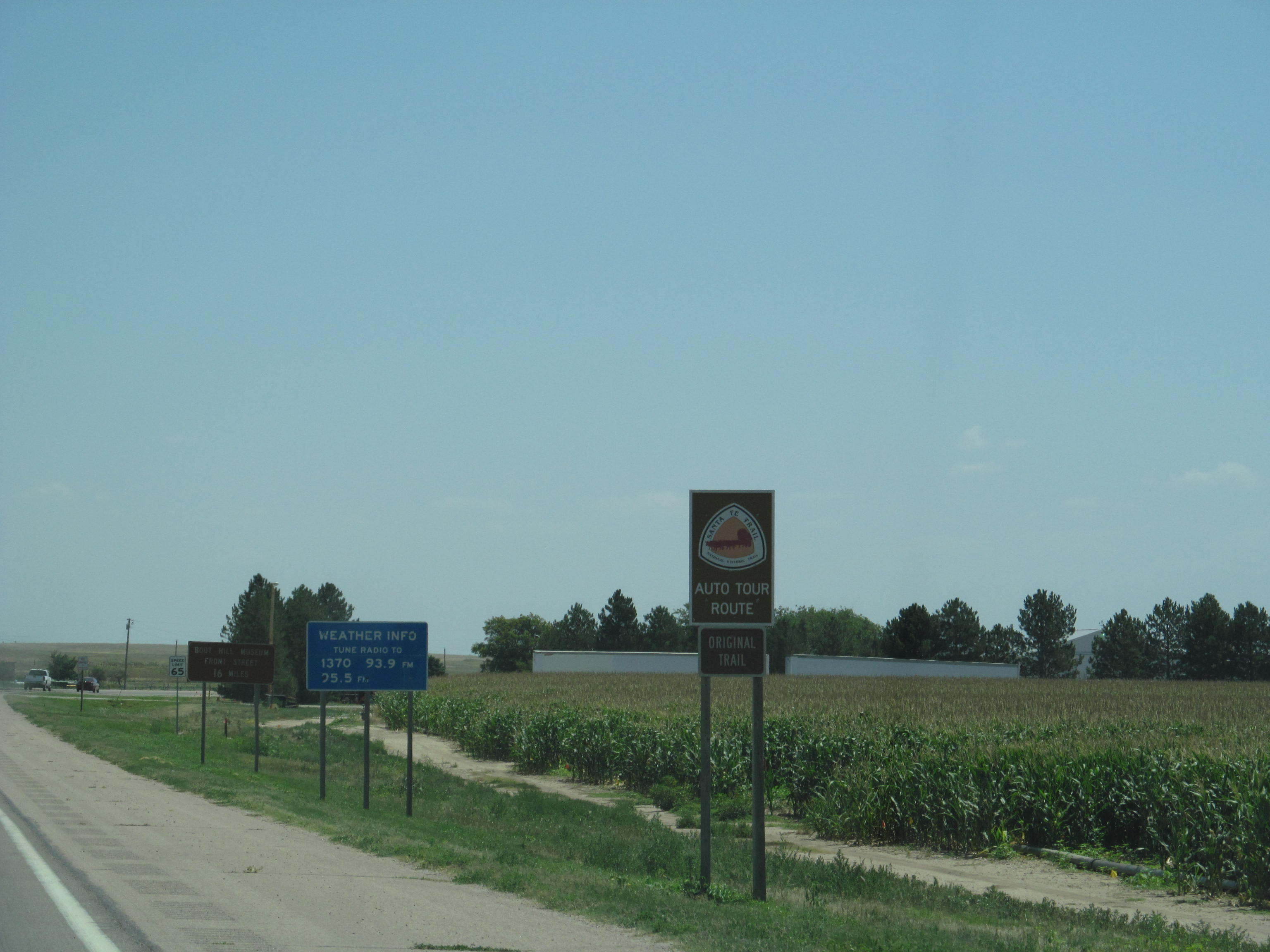
Santa Fe Trail sign along US-50

US-50 was established in Kansas by 1927, and at that time split into two branch routes. Branch routes were once common along the U.S. highway system but have always been discouraged. Branch routes that remain exist mostly in Kentucky and Tennessee. The US-50 split began in Garden City and ended near Baldwin City. In Garden City, the split began at Kansas Avenue and Main Street. US-50N continued east on Kansas Ave. and went through Jetmore, Larned, Great Bend, Lyons, McPherson and Baldwin City. US-50S ran along current US-50. The routes rejoined near what is now the intersection of US-56 and K-33.

The first route considered for US-56 was via US-40 from Ellsworth to Topeka and K-4 and US-59 via Atchison to St. Joseph, Missouri. A revised route adopted in March 1955, due to AASHO objections to the original route, which traveled concurrently with other U.S. Highways for over half of its length, followed K-14, K-18, US-24, K-63, K-16, and US-59 via Lincoln and Manhattan. In July 1955, the US-50N Association proposed a plan that would have eliminated US-50N by routing US 56 along most of its length, from Larned east to Baldwin Junction, and then along US-59 to Lawrence and K-10 to Kansas City; towns on US-50N west of Larned, which would have been bypassed, led a successful fight against this. However, in September of that year, the Kansas Highway Commission accepted that plan, taking US-56 east to Kansas City. On June 27, 1956, the AASHO Route Numbering Committee considered this refined plan for US-56, between Springer, New Mexico and Kansas City, Missouri, with a short US-156 along the remaining portion of US-50N from Larned west to Garden City. The entirety of US-156 was decommissioned on April 1, 1981, and redesignated as K-156.

In mid 2019, work began to convert the junction with US-281 to an enhanced roundabout. The roundabout includes outer diamond shape lanes for oversized loads to bypass the roundabout. The former intersection with US-281 was dangerous as only US-281 traffic had to stop and therefore was the location of several injury and fatal accidents. Between 2002 and 2012, there were 21 accidents, resulting in one fatality. On March 4, 2020, traffic was rerouted, from a four-way stop and temporary asphalt detour, onto the permanent concrete outer roads for the roundabout. The roundabout was completed and opened up to traffic on May 22, 2020. Venture Corporation from Great Bend, was the primary contractor for the $5.2 million project.

On July 20, 2020 work began on a project to reconstruct US-50 from Road E5 to a half mile east of Road F in Lyon County. The project will widen the highway to 4-lanes for one mile. Improvements also will be made at the Road E5 and Road F intersections. Koss Construction Company of Topeka is the primary contractor of the $7.8 million project.

== Future ==
In May 2020, KDOT's Eisenhower Legacy Transportation Plan was announced. One project included in the statewide plan will complete the four-lane expressway between Garden City and Dodge City.

== Junction list ==
County	Location	mi	km	Exit	Destinations	Notes
Hamilton	Coolidge	0.000	0.000		US 50 west / US 400 west	Continuation into Colorado
Hamilton	Syracuse	16.094	25.901		K-27 north (McDow Street) – Tribune	West end of concurrency with K-27
Hamilton	Syracuse	16.624	26.754		K-27 south (Main Street) – Johnson City	East end of concurrency with K-27
Kearny	Lakin	43.965	70.755		K-25 (Main Street) – Ulysses, Leoti	
Finney	Holcomb	59.848	96.316		Big Lowe Road – Holcomb	Diamond interchange
Finney	Garden City	65.848	105.972		US-83 north / US 50 Bus. east / US 83 Bus. south – Garden City, Scott City	Diamond interchange; west end of concurrency with US-83
Finney	Garden City	69.618	112.039		K-156 (Kansas Avenue) / Mary Street	Pair of half-diamond interchanges with one-way ramps connecting Mary Street and K-156
Finney	Garden City	71.156	114.514		US-83 south / US 50 Bus. west (Fulton Street) – Garden City, Liberal	Partial cloverleaf interchange; east end of concurrency with US-83
Gray	Cimarron	102.427	164.840		K-23 (Main Street) – Meade, Dighton	
Ford		116.681	187.780		US-400 east – Greensburg, Hugoton	East end of concurrency with US-400
Ford	Dodge City	126.349	203.339		US-56 west / US-283 south – Dodge City, Minneola	West end of concurrencies with US-56 and US-283
Ford	Wright	128.085	206.133		US-283 north – Jetmore	East end of concurrency with US-283
Edwards	Kinsley	156.245	251.452		US-56 east – Great Bend	East end of concurrency with US-56
Edwards	Kinsley	157.363	253.251		US-183 (Niles Avenue) – Greensburg, La Crosse	
Edwards	Belpre	175.192	281.944		K-19 north (Larned Street) – Larned	
Stafford		194.427	312.900		US-281 – Great Bend, Pratt	
Reno		232.954	374.903		K-61 south (John Neal Memorial Highway) – Pratt	Interchange; west end of concurrency with K-61
Reno		238.462	383.767	—	K-14 north / K-96 west (Nickerson Boulevard) – Lyons	Partial cloverleaf interchange; west end of expressway; west end of concurrencies with K-14 and K-96
Reno	South Hutchinson	239.974	386.201	—	K-14 south / K-96 east / Main Street north – South Hutchinson, Wichita	East end of concurrencies with K-14 and K-96
Reno	South Hutchinson	240.957	387.783	—	Scott Boulevard / McNew Road	
Reno	Hutchinson	242.535	390.322	—	K-61 north (Ken Kennedy Freeway) / Lorraine Street south – McPherson	East end of concurrency with K-61
Reno				—	Airport Road / Yoder Road	East end of expressway; serves Hutchinson Municipal Airport
Harvey		264.566	425.778		K-89 south – Halstead	
Harvey	Newton	271.238	436.515	—	Meridian Road	Partial cloverleaf interchange; west end of freeway
Harvey	Newton	272.514	438.569	—	Anderson Avenue	
Harvey	Newton	273.514	440.178	—	K-15 north (Kansas Avenue)	Partial cloverleaf interchange; west end of concurrency with K-15; serves Newton Medical Center
Harvey	Newton	274.272	441.398	—	I-135 south (US-81 / K-15 south) – Wichita	Full Y interchange; east end of concurrency with K-15; west end of concurrency with I-135/US-81; I-135 exit 30
Harvey	Newton	275.037– 275.543	442.629– 443.443	31	First Street / Broadway Street	Pair of half-diamond interchanges with one-way ramps connecting First Street and Broadway Street; exit number follows I-135
Harvey	Newton	276.373	444.779	—	I-135 / US-81 north – Salina	Eastbound exit westbound entrance; east end of concurrency with I-135/US-81; I-135 exit number 33
Harvey	Newton	277.406	446.442	—	12th Street	Westbound exit and eastbound entrance; access via Old Trail Road; east end of freeway
Marion	Florence	302.524	486.865		US-77 / 8th Street east – Marion, El Dorado	Roundabout
Chase	Elmdale	320.589	515.938		K-150 west – Marion	Eastern terminus of K-150
Chase	Strong City	327.581	527.191		K-177 – Cottonwood Falls, Council Grove	Partial cloverleaf interchange
Lyon	Emporia	345.346	555.781		To I-35 / I-335 / Kansas Turnpike – Kansas City, Wichita, Topeka	Roundabout with connector to I-35; I-35 Exit 127B
Lyon	Emporia	348.128	560.258		K-99 (Commercial Street) – Olpe, Admire	
Lyon	Emporia	350.438	563.975		I-35 south – Wichita	Diamond interchange; west end of concurrency with I-35; I-35 exit 133
Lyon	Jackson Township			135	County Road R1	
Lyon	Jackson Township			138	County Road U	
Lyon	Jackson Township			141	K-130 – Neosho Rapids, Hartford	
Coffey	Lebo			148	K-131 – Lebo	
Coffey	Key West Township			155	US-75 – Lyndon, Burlington	
Osage	Melvern			160	K-31 north – Melvern	Southern end of K-31 concurrency
Osage	Melvern			162	K-31 south – Waverly	Northern end of K-31 concurrency
Franklin	Williamsburg			170	Williamsburg, Pomona	Formerly designated as K-273
Franklin	Homewood Township			176	Homewood	
Franklin	Ottawa			182	Eisenhower Road	
Franklin	Ottawa			183	US-59 south – Garnett	Southern end of US-59 concurrency
Franklin	Harrison Township			185	15th Street	
Franklin	Ottawa			187	K-68 – Ottawa, Louisburg	
Franklin	Ottawa			188	US-59 north – Lawrence	Northern end of US-59 concurrency
Franklin	Franklin Township			193	Tennessee Road	
Franklin	Wellsville			198	K-33 – Wellsville	
Miami	No major junctions					
Johnson	Edgerton			202	Sunflower Road – Edgerton	
Johnson	Gardner Township			205	Homestead Lane	Diverging diamond interchange
Johnson	Gardner			207	Gardner Road	
Johnson	Gardner			210	US-56 west – Gardner	Southern end of US-56 concurrency
Johnson	Olathe			214	Lone Elm Road, 159th Street	
Johnson	Olathe			215	US-169 south / K-7 – Paola	Southern end of US-169 concurrency
Johnson	Olathe			217	Old Highway 56	Southbound exit and northbound entrance
Johnson	Olathe			218	Santa Fe	
Johnson	Olathe			220	119th Street	
Johnson	Lenexa				I-35 north (US-56 east / US-169 north) – Des Moines	Exit 222A on I-35; east end of concurrency with I-35/US-56/US-169
Johnson	Lenexa				I-435 west	Exit 83 on I-435; west end of concurrency with I-435
Johnson	Overlap with I-435					
Johnson	Leawood	447.93	720.87		I-435 east / US 50 east	Continuation into Kansas City, Missouri
1.000 mi = 1.609 km; 1.000 km = 0.621 mi: Concurrency terminus; Incomplete access

== Special routes ==
In Garden City. US-50 and US-83 each have business routes. They both start at the same place, at the junction of US-50, 83 and 400 about one mile (1.6 km) north of town. They run concurrently along the former alignments of US-50 and 83 through town to the intersection of Main Street and Fulton Street. At that point, the business routes split and Business 50 heads east to meet up with US-50, 83 and 400 east of town.

US-50 once had alternate routings in Garden City and Dodge City and business routes in Dodge City and Ottawa. Former Alternate 50 in Garden City is now known as Campus Drive. Its purpose was to connect US-50 travelers to then-US-156 without having to go all the way into downtown. Its purpose was taken over by Spur US-83 in the 1970s. Spur US-83 is now the bypass around Garden City that carries highways 50, 83 and 400.

Former Alternate 50 at Dodge City is now the main route for US-50. Business 50 in Dodge City was decommissioned when the US-400 bypass was built to the south and west of that city. Business 50 in Ottawa ran along the former US-50 alignment through Ottawa.

U.S. Route 50
Previous state: Colorado	Kansas	Next state: Missouri
