= Michigan Valley, Kansas =

- Unincorporated community
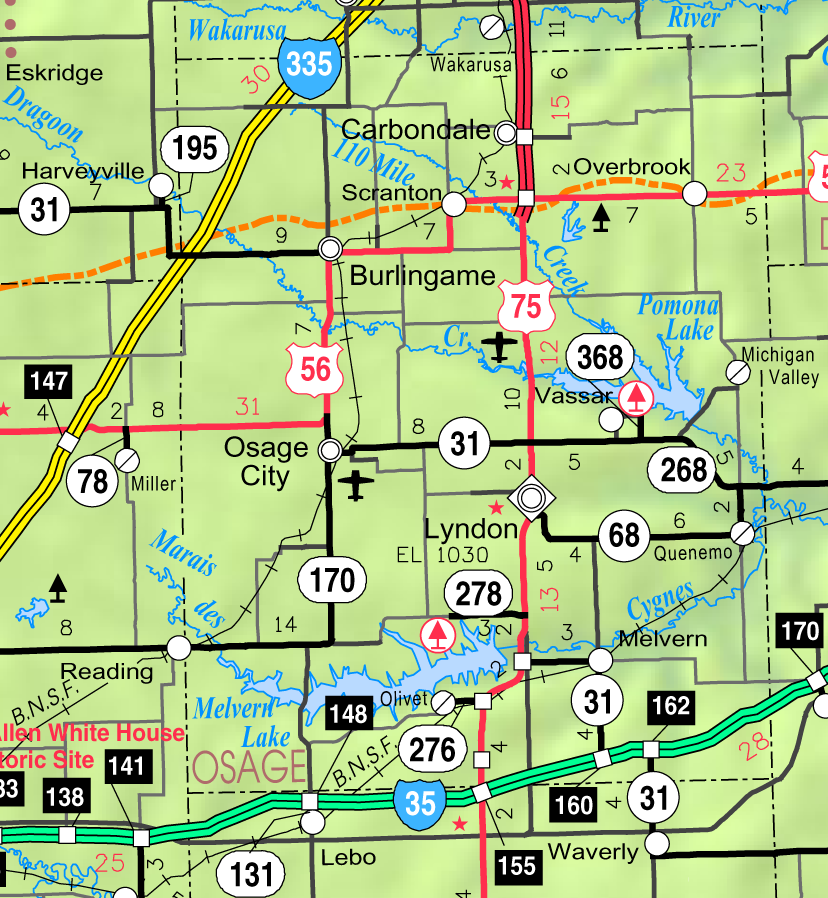
- KDOT map of Osage County (legend)

- Location within Kansas Location within the United States
- Coordinates: 38°40′54″N 95°31′36″W
- Country: United States
- State: Kansas
- County: Osage
- Elevation: 1,073 ft (327 m)
- Time zone: UTC-6 (CST)
  - Summer (DST): UTC-5 (CDT)
- Area code: 785
- GNIS ID: 479323

Michigan Valley is an unincorporated community in Osage County, Kansas, United States. It is located two miles east of Pomona Lake.

== History ==
A post office was opened in Michigan Valley in 1870, and remained in operation until it was discontinued in 1967.
