= Burlingame Township, Kansas =

Township in Osage County, Kansas, U.S.

Burlingame Township
- Township
- Location within Osage County
- Coordinates: 38.808766°N 95.868125°W
- Country: United States
- State: Kansas
- County: Osage

Area
  - Total: 72.311 sq mi (187.28 km^{2})
  - Land: 72.087 sq mi (186.70 km^{2})
  - Water: 0.224 sq mi (0.58 km^{2}) 0.31%
- Elevation: 1,158 ft (353 m)

Population (2020)
  - Total: 1,704
  - Density: 23.64/sq mi (9.127/km^{2})
- Time zone: UTC-6 (CST)
  - Summer (DST): UTC-5 (CDT)
- Area code: 785
- GNIS feature ID: 479440

Burlingame Township is a township in Osage County, Kansas, United States. As of the 2020 census, its population was 1,704.

== Geography ==
Burlingame Township covers an area of 72.311 square miles (187.28 square kilometers).

=== Communities ===
- Burlingame

=== Adjacent townships ===
- Auburn Township, Shawnee County (north)
- Scranton Township, Osage County (east)
- Dragoon Township, Osage County (south)
- Waterloo Township, Lyon County (southwest)
- Plumb Township, Wabaunsee County (west)
- Mission Creek Township, Wabaunsee County, Mission Creek Township, Wabaunsee County (northwest)

== Transportation ==
=== Major highways ===
- I-335 / Kansas Turnpike
- US-56
- K-31
