= Osage State Fishing Lake =

- Location within Kansas Location within the United States
- Location: Osage County, Kansas
- Coordinates: 38°45′55″N 95°40′18″W
- Type: man-made lake
- Basin countries: United States
- Surface area: 140 acres (57 ha)
- Surface elevation: 1,086 ft (331 m)

Osage State Fishing Lake is a lake located in northern Osage County, Kansas. It is a mile east of U.S. Route 75. Scranton, Kansas, is to the lake's northwest and Overbrook, Kansas, is to the northeast. Osage Lake is a freshwater man-made lake, constructed in 1955. It has a surface area of 140 acres (57 ha), The parkland in which the lake is contained has 366 acres (148 ha) of land, mostly tall grass prairie with numerous wooded areas. The lake is owned by the State of Kansas.

Fishing, boating, hiking and camping are permitted at the lake. Swimming is not allowed. A variety of fish have been stocked in the lake. Fishing for channel catfish is rated as excellent and fishing for largemouth bass and bluegill are rated as good.

Osage Lake is almost completely surrounded by gravel park roads. The roads end at the edge of the dam on the south end of the lake. Some of the roadway in the southeast quarter of the lake is barely above the water level. Since it easily floods, vehicles may be trapped in that quarter until the water subsides.

The lake has the following amenities:

- Two public toilets on the lake's west side.
- Fourteen earth and rock fishing piers jutting into the lake. Ten are on the west side and four are on the east side.
- A boat ramp just north of the dam on the lake's southwest corner.
- Three areas on the west side where tents may be pitched.
- Hunting is allowed at certain times in parts of the park.
- What the lake does not have are hiking trails.

The Santa Fe Trail passed through this area in the nineteenth century. On the north edge of the lake property are ruts from wagons that traveled on the Santa Fe Trail. These are visible from the ground in the winter months, when all the vegetation is dead. They are also visible from satellite photographs.
