= Agency Township, Kansas =

Township in Osage County, Kansas, U.S.

Agency Township, Osage County, Kansas
- Township
- Location within Norton County
- Coordinates: 38°34′21″N 95°32′12″W
- Country: United States
- State: Kansas
- County: Osage

Area
  - Total: 33.2 sq mi (85.9 km^{2})
  - Land: 33.1 sq mi (85.8 km^{2})
  - Water: 0.039 sq mi (0.1 km^{2})
- Elevation: 1,014 ft (309 m)

Population (2020)
  - Total: 425
  - Density: 12.8/sq mi (4.95/km^{2})
- Time zone: UTC-6 (Central (CST))
  - Summer (DST): UTC-5 (CDT)
- Area code: 785
- FIPS code: 20-00450
- GNIS feature ID: 0479612

Agency Township is a township in Osage County, Kansas, United States.

== Geography ==
The Marais des Cygnes River flows through it.

=== Communities ===
- Quenemo

=== Adjacent townships ===
- Junction Township, Osage County (north)
- Pomona Township, Franklin County (northeast)
- Greenwood Township, Franklin County (east)
- Lincoln Township, Osage County (south)
- Melvern Township, Osage County (southwest)
- Valley Brook Township, Osage County (west)

=== Major highways ===
- K-68
- K-268
