= Elk Township, Osage County, Kansas =

Township in Osage County, Kansas, U.S.

Elk Township
- Township
- Location within Osage County
- Coordinates: 38.803664°N 95.552085°W
- Country: United States
- State: Kansas
- County: Osage

Area
  - Total: 54.230 sq mi (140.46 km^{2})
  - Land: 54.129 sq mi (140.19 km^{2})
  - Water: 0.101 sq mi (0.26 km^{2}) 0.19%
- Elevation: 1,135 ft (346 m)

Population (2020)
  - Total: 1,843
  - Density: 34.05/sq mi (13.15/km^{2})
- Time zone: UTC-6 (CST)
  - Summer (DST): UTC-5 (CDT)
- Area code: 785
- GNIS feature ID: 479469

Elk Township is a township in Osage County, Kansas, United States. As of the 2020 census, its population was 1,843.

== Geography ==
Elk Township covers an area of 54.230 square miles (140.46 square kilometers).

=== Communities ===
- Overbrook

=== Adjacent townships ===
- Monmouth Township, Shawnee County (north)
- Clinton Township, Douglas County (northeast)
- Marion Township, Douglas County (east)
- Appanoose Township, Franklin County (southeast)
- Junction Township, Osage County (south)
- Fairfax Township, Osage County (southwest)
- Ridgeway Township, Osage County (west)

== Transportation ==
=== Major highways ===
- US-56
