= Kanwaka Township, Kansas =

Kanwaka Township
- Township
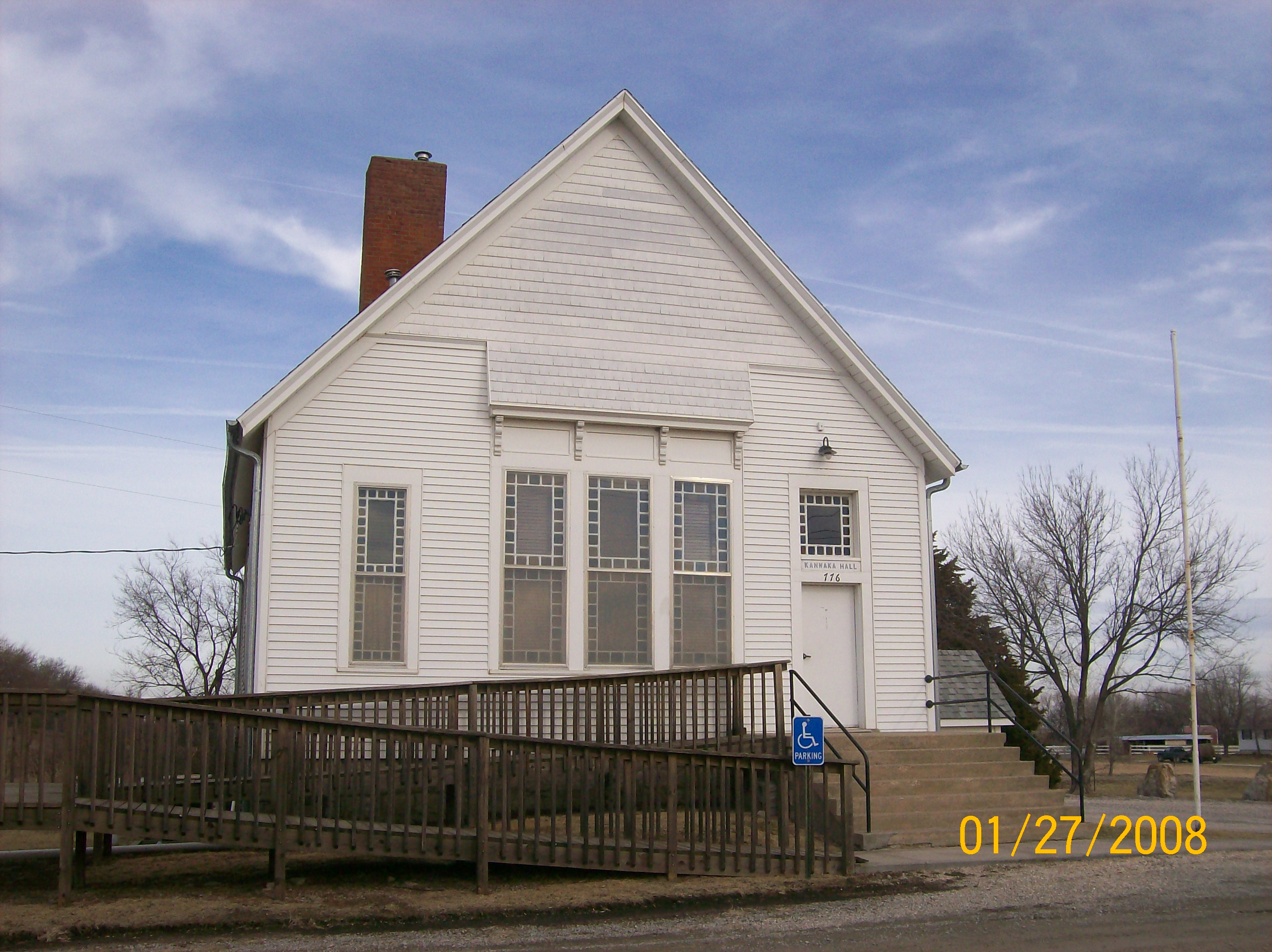
- Kanwaka Hall, once the Congregational Church

- Location in Douglas County
- Coordinates: 38°58′00″N 095°24′31″W
- Country: United States
- State: Kansas
- County: Douglas

Area
  - Total: 46.99 sq mi (121.71 km^{2})
  - Land: 43.85 sq mi (113.57 km^{2})
  - Water: 3.14 sq mi (8.14 km^{2}) 6.69%
- Elevation: 1,030 ft (314 m)

Population (2020)
  - Total: 1,401
  - Density: 31.95/sq mi (12.34/km^{2})
- GNIS feature ID: 0479103

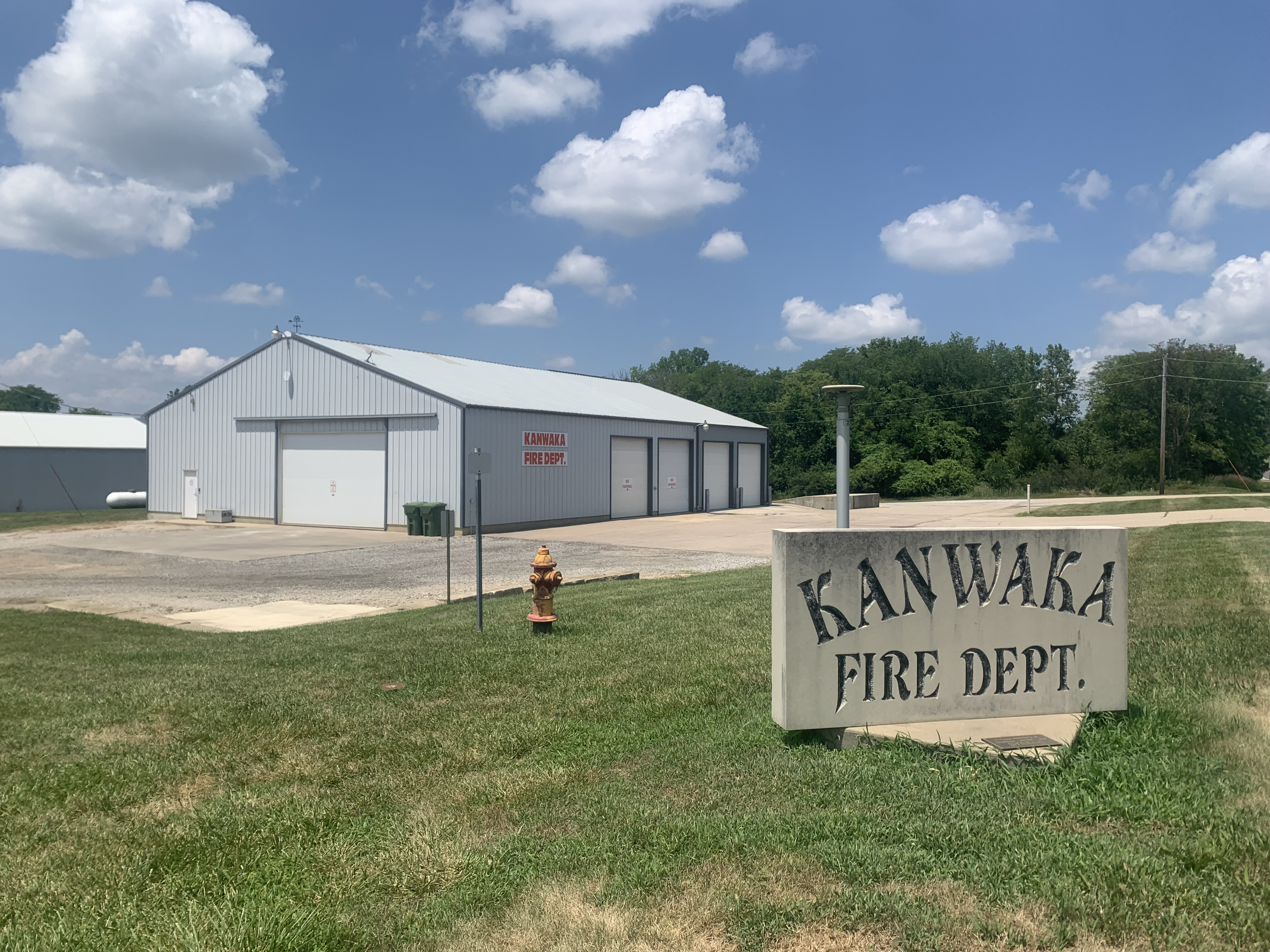
Kanwaka Township Fire Department (2025)

Kanwaka Township is a township in Douglas County, Kansas, United States. As of the 2020 census, its population was 1,401.

== History ==
The name is a portmanteau of the Kansas River and Wakarusa River.

== Geography ==
Kanwaka Township covers an area of 46.99 square miles (121.7 km^{2}) and contains no incorporated settlements.

The streams of Coon Creek, Deer Creek and Dry Creek run through this township.

The township contains two cemeteries, Mound and Stull.

== Adjacent townships ==
- Lecompton Township, Douglas County (north)
- Wakarusa Township, Douglas County (east)
- Clinton Township, Douglas County (south)
- Monmouth Township, Shawnee County (southwest)
- Tecumseh Township, Shawnee County (northwest)

== Transportation ==
=== Major highways ===
- I-70, as part of the Kansas Turnpike.
- U.S. Highway 40
- K-10

== Communities ==
Although these towns may not be incorporated or populated, they are still placed on maps produced by the county.

- Kanwaka, located at 38°58′19″N 95°22′16″W
- Stull, located at 38°58′16″N 95°27′22″W

== Points of interest ==
- Kanwaka Hall, located along U.S. Highway 40, the building was constructed in 1889 as the Kanwaka Congregational Church.
- Barber School, a one-room schoolhouse now on federal property near Clinton Lake.
