= Pomona State Park =

State park in Kansas, United States

- Location within Kansas Location within the United States
- Interactive map of Pomona State Park
- Location: Osage County, Kansas, United States
- Coordinates: 38°39′28″N 95°35′51″W
- Area: 490 acres (200 ha)
- Elevation: 974 ft (297 m)
- Established: 1963
- Administrator: Kansas Department of Wildlife and Parks
- Visitors: 159,779 (in 2022)
- Website: Official website
- Kansas State Parks

Pomona State Park, previously called Vassar State Park, is located on the south shore of Pomona Lake, northeast of the community of Vassar in Osage County, Kansas, United States. In addition to a dozen different campgrounds with some 350 modern and primitive campsites and a full-service marina, the park offers facilities for swimming, hiking, and picnicking. It is accessed by K-368, between Vassar and nearby Overbrook, Kansas. The Flint Hills Trail, a 91-mile-long hiking and bicycling trail, passes near the park.

== See also ==
- 1978 Whippoorwill Tornado
