= Auburn Township, Kansas =

Township in Shawnee County, Kansas, U.S.

Auburn Township
- Township
- Location within Shawnee County
- Coordinates: 38.914°N 95.843271°W
- Country: United States
- State: Kansas
- County: Shawnee
- Established: 1860

Government
  - Township Trustee: Sandy Mitchell

Area
  - Total: 55.958 sq mi (144.93 km^{2})
  - Land: 54.745 sq mi (141.79 km^{2})
  - Water: 1.213 sq mi (3.14 km^{2}) 2.17%

Population (2020)
  - Total: 3,312
  - Density: 60.50/sq mi (23.36/km^{2})
- Time zone: UTC-6 (CST)
  - Summer (DST): UTC-5 (CDT)
- Area code: 785
- GNIS feature ID: 479055

Auburn Township is a township in Shawnee County, Kansas, United States. As of the 2020 census, its population was 3,312.

== History ==
Auburn Township was established on March 17, 1860. Daniel Turner was the first settler in what would become Auburn Township, settling there in December 1854. The first church in the township was Methodist, and built in 1856. The first reverend was Rev. J. F. Griffin. Williamsport Township was organized from part of Auburn Township on April 20, 1860.

== Geography ==
Auburn Township covers an area of 55.958 square miles (144.93 square kilometers). The Wakarusa River flows through it, as well as Sixmile Creek.

=== Communities ===
- Auburn

=== Adjacent townships ===
Dover Township, Shawnee County
		north	northeast	Mission Township, Shawnee County
Mission Creek Township, Wabaunsee County	west	self	east	Williamsport Township, Shawnee County
Plumb Township, Wabaunsee County	southwest	south	southeast	Scranton Township, Osage County
Burlingame Township, Osage County

== Transportation ==
=== Major highways ===
- I-335 / Kansas Turnpike
