= Key West Township, Kansas =

Key West Township
- Township
- Location in Coffey County
- Coordinates: 38°23′25″N 095°44′51″W
- Country: United States
- State: Kansas
- County: Coffey

Area
  - Total: 47.93 sq mi (124.13 km^{2})
  - Land: 47.60 sq mi (123.28 km^{2})
  - Water: 0.33 sq mi (0.85 km^{2}) 0.68%
- Elevation: 1,198 ft (365 m)

Population (2020)
  - Total: 263
  - Density: 5.53/sq mi (2.13/km^{2})
- GNIS feature ID: 0477557

Key West Township is a township in Coffey County, Kansas, United States. As of the 2020 census, its population was 263.

== Geography ==
Key West Township covers an area of 47.93 square miles (124.1 km^{2}) and contains no incorporated settlements. According to the USGS, it contains one cemetery, Key West.

The streams of Joe Creek and Sand Creek run through this township.
