= K-31 (Kansas highway) =

State highway in Kansas, U.S.

K-31
- K-31 highlighted in red

Route information
- Maintained by KDOT and the cities of Burlingame, and Osage City
- Length: 134 mi (216 km)
- Existed: 1927–present

Major junctions
- East end: US-69 in Fulton
- US-59 from Kincaid to Garnett; US-169 in Garnett; I-35 / US-50 south of Melvern; US-75 from Melvern to Lyndon; US-56 from Osage City to Burlingame
- North end: K-99 west of Harveyville

Location
- Country: United States
- State: Kansas
- Counties: Wabaunsee, Osage, Coffey, Anderson, Linn, Bourbon

Highway system
- Kansas State Highway System; Interstate; US; State; Spurs
← K-30	→ K-32
← K-34	→ K-34
← K-38	→ K-39

K-31 is a 134-mile (216 km) long state highway in the U.S. state of Kansas. K-31 is signed as east–west from US-69 in Fulton to US-59 west of Kincaid and is signed as north–south from US-59 west of Kincaid to K-99 west of Harveyville. K-31 runs diagonally southeast–northwest, connecting small towns in east-central Kansas.

== Route description ==
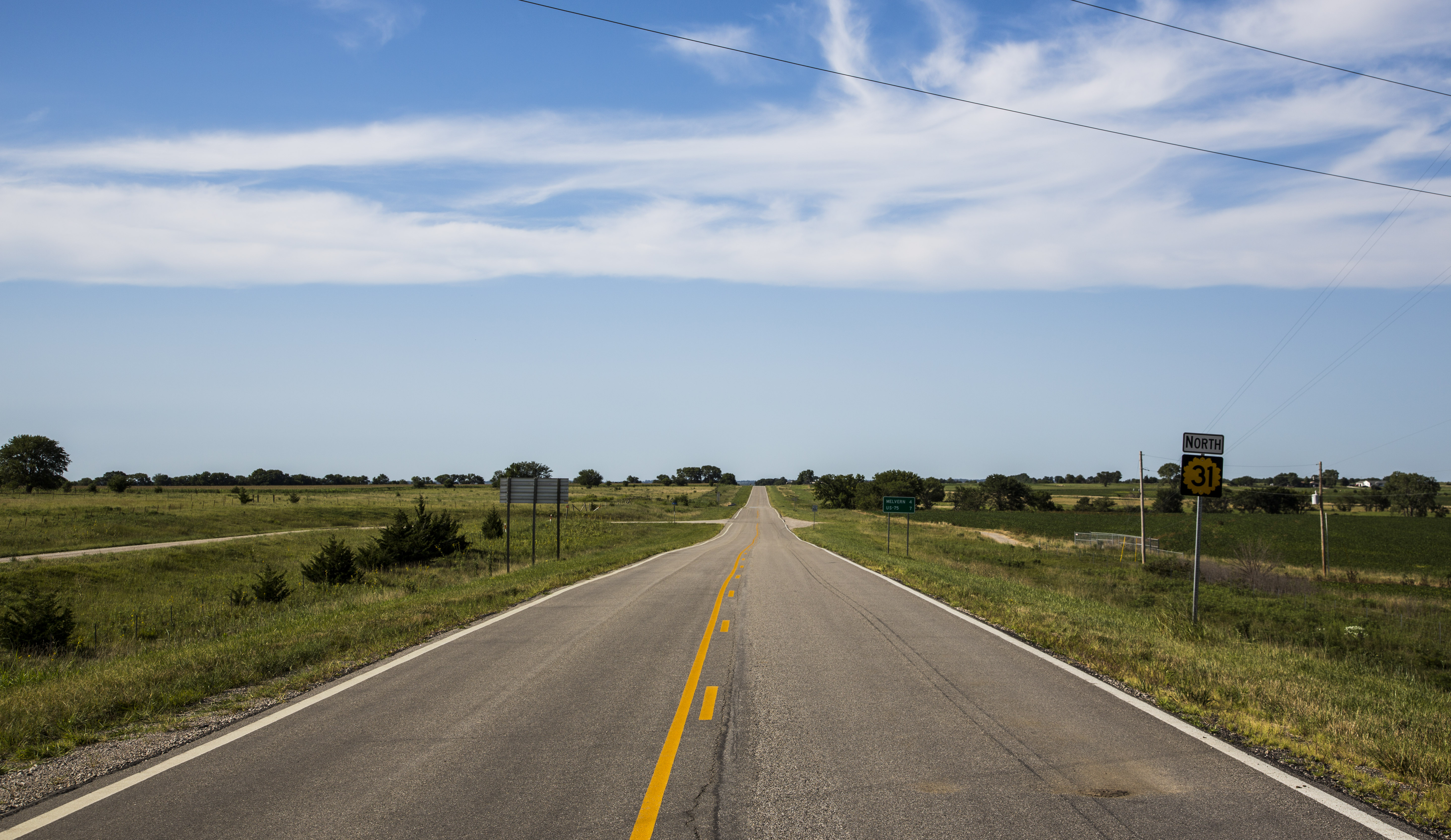
K-31 south of Melvern

K-31 begins at a diamond interchange with U.S. Highway 69 (US-69) near Fulton in Bourbon County and heads west on a two-lane road to Mapleton. The highway turns north for six miles (9.7 km), then turns west again at a junction with K-52. Seven miles (11 km) west of this point, K-31 enters the town of Kincaid, where it begins an 18-mile (29 km) concurrency with US-59, and also overlaps US-169 south of Garnett. In Garnett, K-31 leaves US-59 to the west and heads towards Harris where it turns north, again. It turns west at the Franklin County line and overlaps the border until it enters Coffey County, where it continues west toward Waverly. Leaving the town, K-31 heads north again toward Interstate 35 (I-35), and Melvern. It shares a short wrong-way concurrency with I-35 before arriving in Melvern, where it once again turns west.

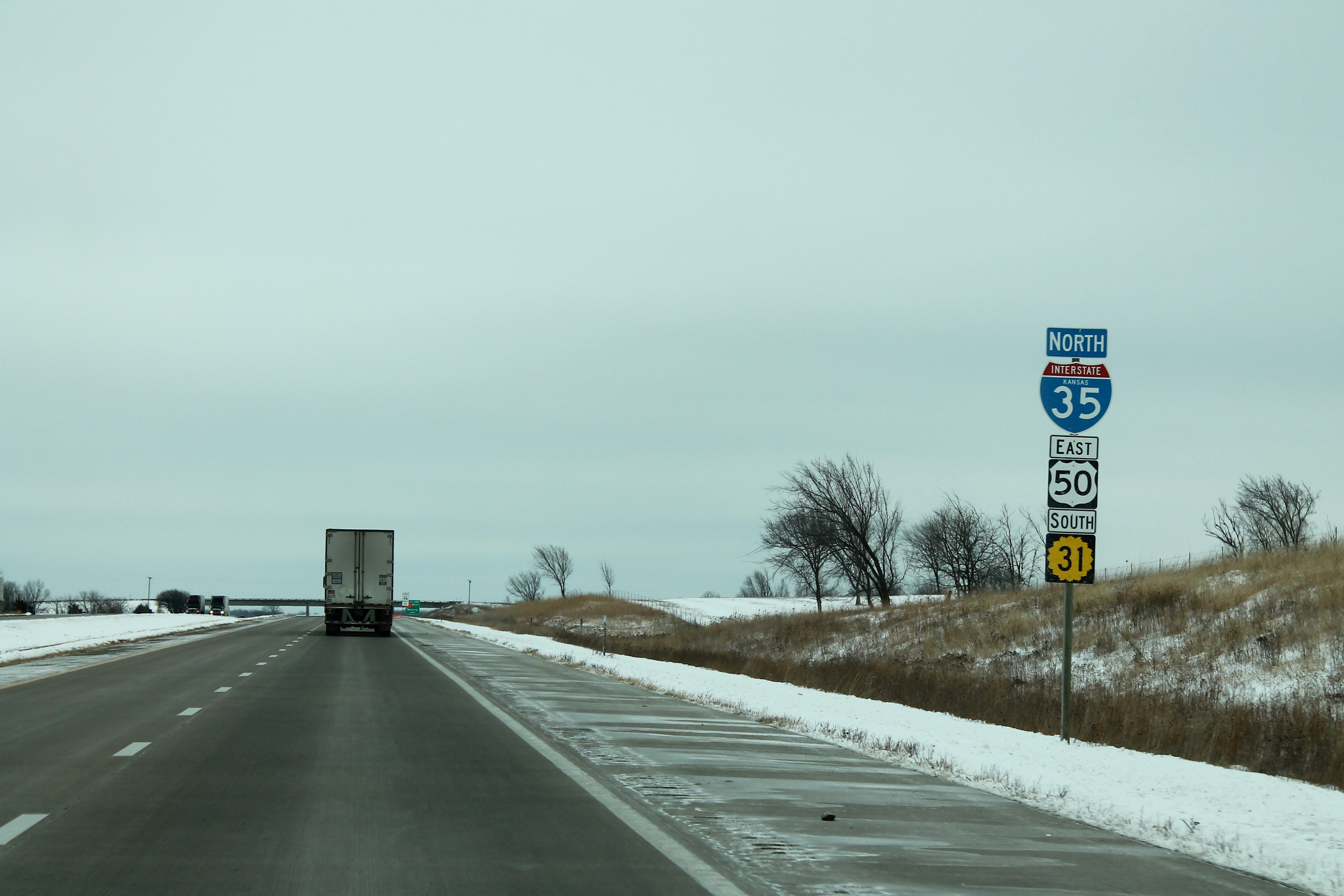
K-31 concurrent with I-35 and US-50

The highway begins a nine-mile (14 km) concurrency with US-75, where it heads toward, and passes through Lyndon. North of the city, K-31 again turns west toward Osage City. It begins a seven-mile (11 km) concurrency with US-56 north of the town and travels north to Burlingame, where it leaves US-56 and heads west toward Harveyville. After passing through Harveyville, K-31 terminates at K-99 in rural Wabaunsee County.

Almost all of K-31's alignment is maintained by the Kansas Department of Transportation. The entire brick section within Burlingame is maintained by the city. The section of K-31 in Osage City from K-170 to slightly east of 9th Street is maintained by the city.

== History ==
K-38
- Existed: 1927–1936

K-34
- Location: Waverly–Garnett
- Existed: 1926–1927

The majority of K-31 has followed the same route since its creation. Minor adjustments were made when I-35 was built, and K-31 was rerouted through Melvern.

The junction with K-268 and US-75 was formerly a four-way intersection. From January 2004 to August 2009, there were a total of 24 crashes, which included one fatality and 15 that resulted in injuries. Residents of the surrounding communities requested a "safer type of intersection." Then in late Fall of 2013, work began to reconstruct the intersection as a roundabout. On November 17, 2014, the new roundabout at the eastern terminus opened to unrestricted traffic. The project was fully completed by the end of December. Smoky Hill LLC from Salina, was the primary contractor on the $2.541 million roundabout project. On August 9, 2018, a tractor-trailer travelling southbound on US-75 crashed into the roundabout. The trucks fuel tank was damaged and spilled about 70 gallons of diesel fuel. K-31 and US-75 traffic was reduced to one lane for about four hours after the crash.

== Major intersections ==
County	Location	mi	km	Destinations	Notes
Bourbon	Fulton	0.0	0.0	US-69 – Kansas City, Fort Scott	Interchange; eastern terminus; continues east as Wagon Road
Bourbon		7	11	K-7 north	Eastern end of K-7 concurrency
Bourbon		8	13	K-7 south	Western end of K-7 concurrency
Bourbon	Mapleton	11	18	K-65 west (6th Street west)	Eastern terminus of K-65
Linn		18	29	K-52 east	Western terminus of K-52
Linn		29	47	K-3 south	Northern terminus of K-3
Anderson	Kincaid	35	56	US-59 south	Southern end of US-59 concurrency; K-31 changes from east–west to north–south
Anderson		47	76	US-169 south	Southern end of US-169 concurrency
Anderson		51	82	US 169 Bus. begins / US-169 north	Roundabout; northern end of US-169 concurrency; southern end of US-169 Bus. concurrency
Anderson	Garnett			US 169 Bus. north (6th Avenue)	Northern end of US-169 Bus. concurrency
Anderson	Garnett	53	85	US-59 north (Maple Street north)	Northern end of US-59 concurrency
Osage		83	134	I-35 north / US-50 east – Kansas City	Eastern end of I-35/US-50 concurrency; I-35 exit 162
Osage		85	137	I-35 south / US-50 west – Wichita	Western end of I-35/US-50 concurrency; I-35 exit 160
Osage		92	148	US-75 south – Burlington	Interchange; southern end of US-75 concurrency
Osage		94	151	K-278 west	Eastern terminus of K-278
Osage	Lyndon	99	159	K-68 east	Western terminus of K-68
Osage		101	163	US-75 north / K-268 east – Topeka, Ottawa	Roundabout; northern end of US-75 concurrency; western terminus of K-268
Osage	Osage City	109	175	K-170 south	Northern terminus of K-170
Osage		110	180	US-56 west / 229th Street	Wye intersection; southern end of US-56 concurrency
Osage		117	188	US-56 east	Northern end of US-56 concurrency
Osage		123	198	Bridge over I-335 / Kansas Turnpike; no access to turnpike	
Wabaunsee	Harveyville	126	203	K-195 north	Southern terminus of K-195
Wabaunsee		134	216	K-99 – Admire, Eskridge	Northern terminus
1.000 mi = 1.609 km; 1.000 km = 0.621 mi: Concurrency terminus
