= U.S. Route 75 in Kansas =

Highway in Kansas

U.S. Highway 75
- US 75 highlighted in red

Route information
- Maintained by KDOT
- Length: 228 mi (367 km)
- Existed: 1926–present

Major junctions
- South end: US 75 near Caney
- I-35 / US-50 near Melvern; I-335 Toll / I-470 Toll / Kansas Turnpike in Topeka; I-70 / US-40 / K-4 in Topeka
- North end: US 75 near Sabetha

Location
- Country: United States
- State: Kansas
- Counties: Montgomery, Wilson, Woodson, Coffey, Osage, Shawnee, Jackson, Brown, Nemaha

Highway system
- United States Numbered Highway System; List; Special; Divided; Kansas State Highway System; Interstate; US; State; Spurs
← K-74	→ K-76

U.S. Route 75 (US-75) is a north–south U.S. Highway stretching from Kittson County, Minnesota, to Dallas, Texas. In Kansas, the highway runs from south to north through the eastern part of the state. It enters the state from Oklahoma near Caney and runs north, serving the state capital of Topeka. The highway continues north of Topeka, passing by the Potawatomi and Kickapoo Indian reservation, and passes over the Nebraska state line near Sabetha.

== Route description ==
US-75 enters Kansas from Oklahoma near Caney and almost immediately starts an overlap with US-166. The highways split about 4 miles north of the state line. South of Neodesha, US-75 overlaps with US-400 as a 2 lane freeway.

At Interstate 35 (I-35), US-75 becomes a two-lane expressway again, passing east of Melvern Lake. About 15 miles south of Topeka, the highway becomes a four lane freeway. US-75 crosses the Kansas Turnpike without any direct access and drivers must use I-470 to access the turnpike. US 75 runs around the main part of the city along I-470 and I-70.

Leaving Topeka, US-75 becomes its own route again. Between Hoyt and Holton, the highway runs along the eastern border of the Potawatomi Indian Reservation. A few miles to the north, the highway runs west of the Kickapoo Reservation. North of Sabetha, US-75 exits the state into Nebraska.

== History ==
The junction with K-268 and K-31 was formerly a four-way intersection. From January 2004 to August 2009, there was a total of 24 crashes, which included one fatality and fifteen that resulted in injuries. Residents of the surrounding communities requested a "safer type of intersection", then in late fall of 2013, work began to reconstruct the intersection as a roundabout. On November 17, 2014, the new roundabout at the eastern terminus opened to unrestricted traffic. The project was fully completed by the end of December. Smoky Hill LLC from Salina, was the primary contractor on the $2.541 million roundabout project. On August 9, 2018, a tractor-trailer travelling southbound on US-75 crashed into the roundabout. The truck's fuel tank was damaged and spilled about 70 gallons of diesel fuel. K-31 and US-75 traffic was reduced to one lane for about four hours after the crash.

== Junction list ==
County	Location	mi	km	Destinations	Notes
Montgomery	Caney	0.00	0.00	US 75 south	Continuation into Oklahoma
Montgomery	Caney	1.7	2.7	US-166 east – Coffeyville, Joplin	South end of US 166 overlap
Montgomery		4.4	7.1	US-166 west – Sedan	North end of US 166 overlap
Montgomery		20.7	33.3	US-160 west – Elk City	South end of US 160 overlap
Montgomery	Independence	23.7	38.1	US-160 east – Oswego	North end of US 160 overlap
Montgomery		33.6	54.1	US-400 east – Parsons	South end of US 400 overlap; south end of expressway
Wilson	Neodesha	37.4	60.2	US-400 west – Fredonia	North end of US 400 overlap; north end of expressway
Wilson	Altoona	47.5	76.4	US 75 Bus. north – Altoona	
Wilson	Altoona	48.6	78.2	K-47 – Fredonia, Girard	
Wilson	Altoona	49	79	US 75 Bus. south – Altoona	
Wilson		59.5	95.8	K-39 east – Chanute	South end of K-39 overlap
Wilson		60.4	97.2	K-39 west – Benedict	North end of K-39 overlap
Woodson	Yates Center	74.7	120.2	US-54 – Eureka, Iola	
Coffey		88.7	142.7	K-58 east – Colony	South end of K-58 overlap
Coffey		89.7	144.4	K-58 west – Madison	North end of K-58 overlap
Coffey	Key West Township	113	182	I-35 / US-50 – Emporia, Wichita, Kansas City	I-35 exit 155. South end of Super 2
Osage		114	183	Township Road	
Osage		117	188	K-276 west – Olivet	
Osage		119	192	K-31 south – Melvern	North end of Super-2. South end of concurrency with K-31
Osage		121	195	K-278 west – Eisenhower State Park	
Osage	Lyndon	125	201	K-68 east – Ottawa	Western terminus of K-68
Osage		128	206	K-31 north / K-268 east – Osage City, Ottawa	Roundabout; north end of concurrency with K-31; western terminus of K-268
Osage		138	222	US-56 – Burlingame, Baldwin City	South end of freeway. US-56 also serves Scranton and Overbrook.
Osage	Carbondale	141	227	Main Street, E. 137th Street	Exit signed simply as "Carbondale"
Shawnee		147	237	Topeka Boulevard	Former US 75 Alt.
Shawnee		149	240	Gary Ormsby Drive, SW 77th Street – Topeka Regional Airport	
Shawnee		151	243	SW 57th Street	
Shawnee	Topeka	153	246	I-470 east to I-335 (Kansas Turnpike) – Wichita, Kansas City	South end of I-470 overlap; I-470 exit 5
Shawnee	Topeka	See I-470			
Shawnee	Topeka	159	256	I-470 end / I-70 / US-40 / K-4 west – Salina	North end of I-470 overlap; south end of I-70/US-40/K-4 overlap; I-470 exit 1A, I-70 exit 355
Shawnee	Topeka	See I-70			
Shawnee	Topeka	161	259	I-70 / US-40 / K-4 east – Lawrence, Kansas City	North end of I-70/US 40/K-4 overlap; I-70 exit 358 eastbound, 358A westbound.
Shawnee	North Topeka	162	261	NW Lower Silver Lake Road, NW 17th Street	
Shawnee	North Topeka	163	262	US-24 – Manhattan, Lawrence	
Shawnee	North Topeka	165	266	NW 35th Street	North end of freeway
Jackson		174	280	K-214 north (110th Road) – Hoyt	Clockwise terminus of K-214
Jackson		175	282	K-214 south (118th Road) – Hoyt	Counterclockwise terminus of K-214
Jackson		185	298	150th Road	Interchange
Jackson	Holton	190	310	K-116 east / K-16 (4th Street) – Onaga, Valley Falls	
Jackson		200	320	K-9 – Wetmore, Netawaka	
Brown		204	328	K-20 east – Horton, Kickapoo Reservation	
Brown	Fairview	216	348	US-36 – Seneca, Hiawatha	Interchange
Brown	Sabetha	221	356	Main Street, 270th Street	Interchange
Nemaha	Sabetha	222	357	K-246 – Sabetha	
Nemaha		228	367	US 75 north	Continuation into Nebraska
1.000 mi = 1.609 km; 1.000 km = 0.621 mi: Concurrency terminus

U.S. Route 75
Previous state: Oklahoma	Kansas	Next state: Nebraska
