= Osage County, Kansas =

County in Kansas, United States

- County
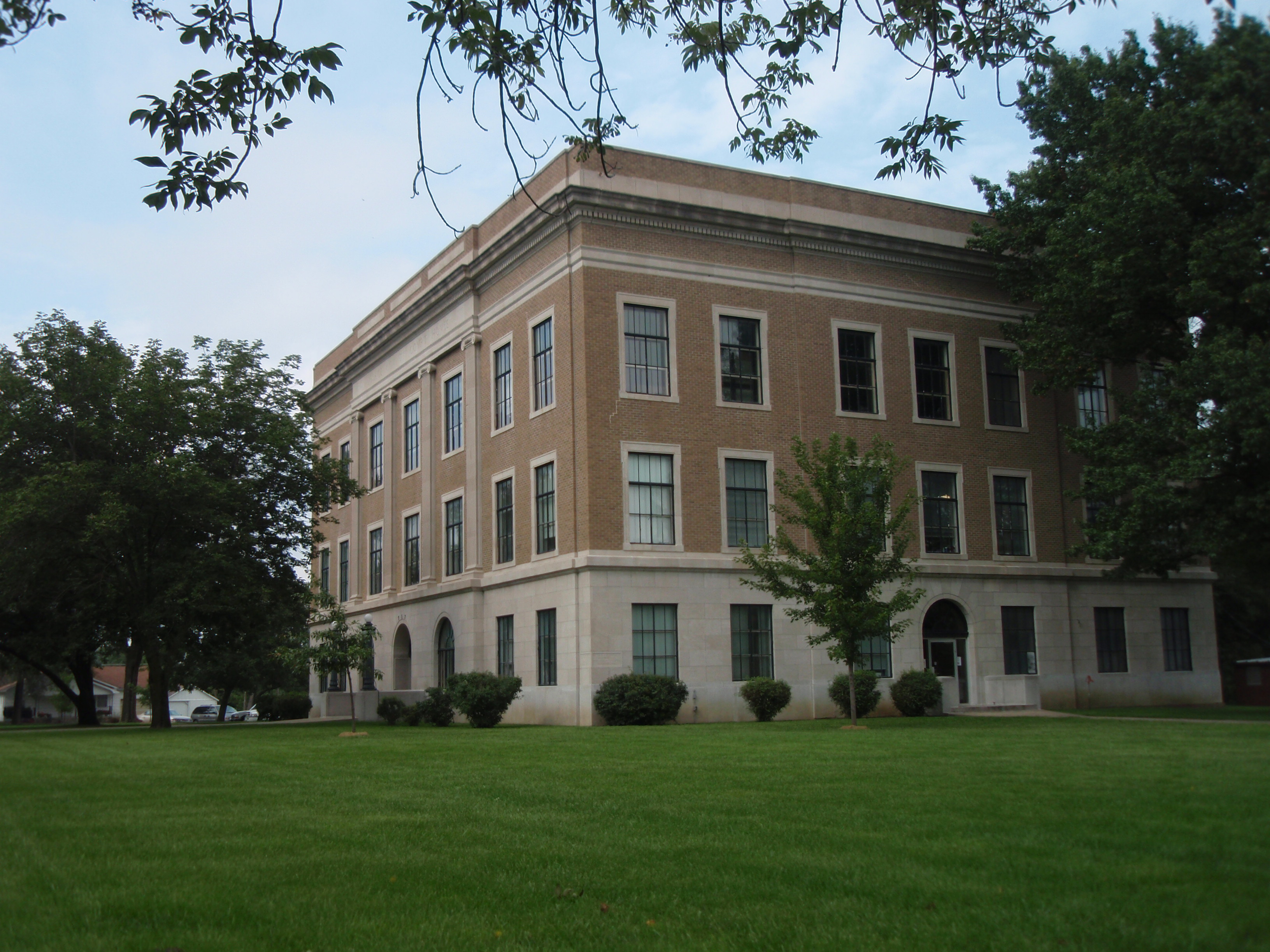
- Osage County Courthouse in Lyndon (2009)
- Nickname: Land of Lakes
- Location within the U.S. state of Kansas
- Coordinates: 38°39′N 95°44′W
- Country: United States
- State: Kansas
- Founded: 1859
- Named for: Osage Nation
- Seat: Lyndon
- Largest city: Osage City

Area
  - Total: 720 sq mi (1,900 km^{2})
  - Land: 706 sq mi (1,830 km^{2})
  - Water: 14 sq mi (36 km^{2}) 2.0%

Population (2020)
  - Total: 15,766
  - Estimate (2024): 15,693 ▼
  - Density: 22.3/sq mi (8.6/km^{2})
- Time zone: UTC−6 (Central)
  - Summer (DST): UTC−5 (CDT)
- Congressional district: 2nd
- Website: OsageCo.org

Osage County (/oʊˈseɪdʒ/ oh-SAYJ) is a county located in the U.S. state of Kansas. Its county seat is Lyndon, and its most populous city is Osage City. As of the 2020 census, the county population was 15,766. The county was originally organized in 1855 as Weller County, then renamed in 1859 after the Osage tribe.

== History ==
=== Early history ===
For many millennia, the Great Plains of North America was inhabited by nomadic Native Americans. From the 16th century to 18th century, the Kingdom of France claimed ownership of large parts of North America. In 1762, after the French and Indian War, France secretly ceded New France to Spain, per the Treaty of Fontainebleau.

=== 19th century ===
In 1802, Spain returned most of the land to France but keeping title to about 7,500 square miles. In 1803, most of the land for modern day Kansas was acquired by the United States from France as part of the 828,000 square miles (2,140,000 km^{2}) Louisiana Purchase for 2.83 cents per acre.

In 1854, the Kansas Territory was organized, then in 1861 Kansas became the 34th U.S. state. In 1859, Osage County was established.

== Geography ==
According to the U.S. Census Bureau, the county has a total area of 720 square miles (1,900 km^{2}), of which 706 square miles (1,830 km^{2}) is land and 14 square miles (36 km^{2}) (2.0%) is water.

=== Adjacent counties ===
- Shawnee County (north)
- Douglas County (northeast)
- Franklin County (east)
- Coffey County (south)
- Lyon County (southwest)
- Wabaunsee County (northwest)

== Demographics ==
Historical population
Census	Pop.	Note	%±
1860	1,113		—
1870	7,648		587.2%
1880	19,642		156.8%
1890	25,062		27.6%
1900	23,659		−5.6%
1910	19,905		−15.9%
1920	18,621		−6.5%
1930	17,538		−5.8%
1940	15,118		−13.8%
1950	12,811		−15.3%
1960	12,886		0.6%
1970	13,352		3.6%
1980	15,319		14.7%
1990	15,248		−0.5%
2000	16,712		9.6%
2010	16,295		−2.5%
2020	15,766		−3.2%
2025 (est.)	15,693	▼	−0.5%
U.S. Decennial Census; 1790-1960 1900-1990; 1990-2000 2010-2020

Osage County is included in the Topeka metropolitan area.

=== Racial and ethnic composition ===
Osage County, Kansas – Racial and ethnic composition Note: the US Census treats Hispanic/Latino as an ethnic category. This table excludes Latinos from the racial categories and assigns them to a separate category. Hispanics/Latinos may be of any race.
Race / Ethnicity (NH = Non-Hispanic)	Pop 1980	Pop 1990	Pop 2000	Pop 2010	Pop 2020	% 1980	% 1990	% 2000	% 2010	% 2020
White alone (NH)	15,059	14,911	16,109	15,560	14,505	98.30%	97.79%	96.39%	95.49%	92.00%
Black or African American alone (NH)	18	29	36	44	33	0.12%	0.19%	0.22%	0.27%	0.21%
Native American or Alaska Native alone (NH)	47	104	104	108	43	0.31%	0.68%	0.62%	0.66%	0.27%
Asian alone (NH)	26	17	27	35	52	0.17%	0.11%	0.16%	0.21%	0.33%
Native Hawaiian or Pacific Islander alone (NH)	x	x	17	4	3	x	x	0.10%	0.02%	0.02%
Other race alone (NH)	21	0	6	2	24	0.14%	0.00%	0.04%	0.01%	0.15%
Mixed race or Multiracial (NH)	x	x	158	212	649	x	x	0.95%	1.30%	4.12%
Hispanic or Latino (any race)	148	187	255	330	457	0.97%	1.23%	1.53%	2.03%	2.90%
Total	15,319	15,248	16,712	16,295	15,766	100.00%	100.00%	100.00%	100.00%	100.00%

=== 2020 census ===
As of the 2020 census, the county had a population of 15,766. The median age was 44.4 years. 23.2% of residents were under the age of 18 and 21.3% of residents were 65 years of age or older. For every 100 females there were 99.2 males, and for every 100 females age 18 and over there were 97.1 males age 18 and over.

The racial makeup of the county was 93.3% White, 0.2% Black or African American, 0.3% American Indian and Alaska Native, 0.3% Asian, 0.0% Native Hawaiian and Pacific Islander, 0.6% from some other race, and 5.2% from two or more races. Hispanic or Latino residents of any race comprised 2.9% of the population.

0.0% of residents lived in urban areas, while 100.0% lived in rural areas.

There were 6,480 households in the county, of which 28.6% had children under the age of 18 living with them and 22.7% had a female householder with no spouse or partner present. About 27.8% of all households were made up of individuals and 13.7% had someone living alone who was 65 years of age or older.

There were 7,233 housing units, of which 10.4% were vacant. Among occupied housing units, 77.5% were owner-occupied and 22.5% were renter-occupied. The homeowner vacancy rate was 1.6% and the rental vacancy rate was 7.9%.

=== 2000 census ===
As of the 2000 census, there were 16,712 people, 6,490 households, and 4,737 families residing in the county. The population density was 24 people per square mile (9.3 people/km^{2}). There were 7,018 housing units at an average density of 10 per square mile (3.9/km^{2}). The racial makeup of the county was 97.27% White, 0.22% Black or African American, 0.65% Native American, 0.17% Asian, 0.10% Pacific Islander, 0.41% from other races, and 1.18% from two or more races. Hispanic or Latino of any race were 1.53% of the population.

There were 6,490 households, out of which 33.80% had children under the age of 18 living with them, 61.00% were married couples living together, 8.10% had a female householder with no husband present, and 27.00% were non-families. 23.50% of all households were made up of individuals, and 11.50% had someone living alone who was 65 years of age or older. The average household size was 2.54 and the average family size was 2.99.

In the county, the population was spread out, with 27.00% under the age of 18, 6.40% from 18 to 24, 27.00% from 25 to 44, 23.70% from 45 to 64, and 15.80% who were 65 years of age or older. The median age was 39 years. For every 100 females, there were 96.00 males. For every 100 females age 18 and over, there were 93.30 males.

The median income for a household in the county was $37,928, and the median income for a family was $44,581. Males had a median income of $30,670 versus $22,981 for females. The per capita income for the county was $17,691. About 6.40% of families and 8.40% of the population were below the poverty line, including 8.40% of those under age 18 and 10.40% of those age 65 or over.

== Government ==
=== Presidential elections ===
Osage County is strongly Republican. In only six presidential elections from 1880 to the present day has the county failed to back the Republican Party candidate, most recently in Lyndon B. Johnson's national landslide of 1964.

Presidential election results

United States presidential election results for Osage County, Kansas
Year	Republican		Democratic		Third party(ies)	
Year	No.	%	No.	%	No.	%
1888	3,442	57.49%	1,380	23.05%	1,165	19.46%
1892	2,604	43.77%	0	0.00%	3,345	56.23%
1896	2,903	44.97%	3,481	53.93%	71	1.10%
1900	3,128	51.16%	2,901	47.45%	85	1.39%
1904	3,670	65.01%	1,516	26.86%	459	8.13%
1908	2,671	50.30%	2,288	43.09%	351	6.61%
1912	850	17.62%	1,969	40.82%	2,005	41.56%
1916	3,770	44.69%	4,276	50.69%	390	4.62%
1920	4,507	62.80%	2,414	33.64%	256	3.57%
1924	4,957	63.20%	2,050	26.14%	836	10.66%
1928	5,900	73.24%	2,058	25.55%	98	1.22%
1932	3,707	45.40%	4,199	51.43%	259	3.17%
1936	4,232	49.87%	4,224	49.78%	30	0.35%
1940	4,991	60.52%	3,186	38.63%	70	0.85%
1944	4,107	64.40%	2,212	34.69%	58	0.91%
1948	3,474	55.55%	2,659	42.52%	121	1.93%
1952	4,589	68.84%	2,036	30.54%	41	0.62%
1956	4,136	67.28%	1,979	32.19%	32	0.52%
1960	3,880	64.02%	2,150	35.47%	31	0.51%
1964	2,681	49.10%	2,737	50.13%	42	0.77%
1968	3,157	56.15%	1,664	29.60%	801	14.25%
1972	4,073	71.11%	1,522	26.57%	133	2.32%
1976	2,945	50.53%	2,755	47.27%	128	2.20%
1980	3,817	60.36%	2,088	33.02%	419	6.63%
1984	4,288	66.55%	2,072	32.16%	83	1.29%
1988	3,496	54.33%	2,840	44.13%	99	1.54%
1992	2,561	34.51%	2,297	30.95%	2,563	34.54%
1996	3,487	48.80%	2,502	35.01%	1,157	16.19%
2000	3,770	57.01%	2,530	38.26%	313	4.73%
2004	4,800	64.32%	2,537	33.99%	126	1.69%
2008	4,820	63.89%	2,534	33.59%	190	2.52%
2012	4,427	64.10%	2,268	32.84%	211	3.06%
2016	4,826	68.49%	1,753	24.88%	467	6.63%
2020	5,705	71.00%	2,136	26.58%	194	2.41%
2024	5,736	72.68%	1,946	24.66%	210	2.66%

=== Laws ===
Osage County was a prohibition, or "dry", county until the Kansas Constitution was amended in 1986 and voters approved the sale of alcoholic liquor by the individual drink with a 30% food sales requirement.

The county voted "No" on the 2022 Kansas abortion referendum, an anti-abortion ballot measure, by 56% to 44% despite backing Donald Trump with 71% of the vote to Joe Biden's 27% in the 2020 presidential election.

== Education ==
=== Unified school districts ===
School districts include:

- Osage City USD 420
- Lyndon USD 421
- Santa Fe Trail USD 434
- Burlingame USD 454
- Marais des Cygnes Valley USD 456
- Auburn-Washburn USD 437
- North Lyon County USD 251
- Wabaunsee East USD 330
- West Franklin USD 287
- Shawnee Heights USD 450
- Lebo-Waverly USD 243

== Media ==
Osage County is served by a weekly newspaper, The Osage County Herald-Chronicle. The newspaper has a circulation of approximately 4,500, making it the 3rd largest paid weekly publication in the state of Kansas.

The Herald-Chronicle was created by the merger of The Osage County Herald and The Osage County Chronicle in February 2007.

== Communities ==
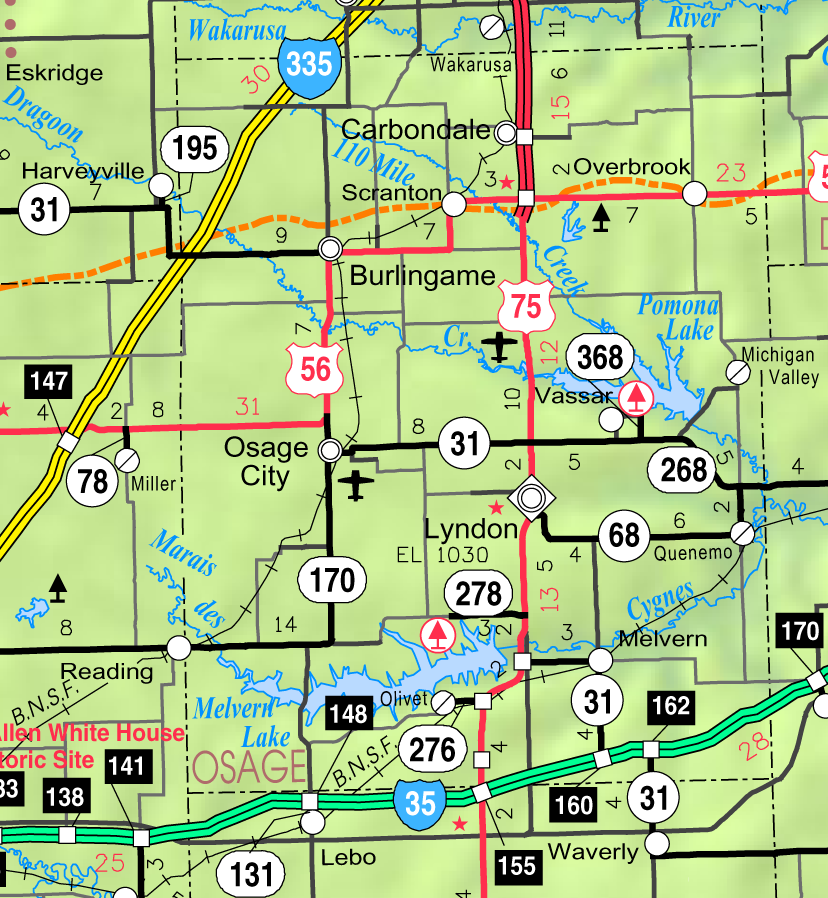
2005 map of Osage County (map legend)

List of townships / incorporated cities / unincorporated communities / extinct former communities within Osage County.

=== Cities ===
- Burlingame
- Carbondale
- Lyndon (county seat)
- Melvern
- Olivet
- Osage City
- Overbrook
- Quenemo
- Scranton

=== Unincorporated communities ===
† means a community is designated a Census-Designated Place (CDP) by the United States Census Bureau.

- Arvonia
- Barclay
- Michigan Valley
- Peterton
- Vassar†

=== Townships ===
Osage County is divided into sixteen townships. The city of Osage City is considered governmentally independent and is excluded from the census figures for the townships. In the following table, the population center is the largest city (or cities) included in that township's population total, if it is of a significant size.

Township	FIPS	Population center	Population	Population density /km^{2} (/sq mi)	Land area km^{2} (sq mi)	Water area km^{2} (sq mi)	Water %	Geographic coordinates
Agency	00450	Quenemo	618	7 (19)	86 (33)	0 (0)	0.10%	38°34′21″N 95°32′12″W
Arvonia	02550		136	1 (3)	112 (43)	13 (5)	10.13%	38°28′52″N 95°52′14″W
Barclay	04175		239	2 (5)	124 (48)	0 (0)	0.14%	38°33′42″N 95°52′0″W
Burlingame	09375	Burlingame	1,768	9 (25)	186 (72)	1 (0)	0.43%	38°47′5″N 95°52′5″W
Dragoon	18575		214	2 (6)	94 (36)	0 (0)	0.07%	38°43′14″N 95°49′16″W
Elk	20175	Overbrook	1,723	12 (32)	140 (54)	0 (0)	0.30%	38°47′21″N 95°33′58″W
Fairfax	22150		513	5 (12)	111 (43)	5 (2)	4.14%	38°42′34″N 95°40′3″W
Grant	27850		297	3 (8)	93 (36)	0 (0)	0.25%	38°38′25″N 95°52′24″W
Junction	35725		1,210	9 (24)	129 (50)	0 (0)	0.15%	38°40′27″N 95°34′8″W
Lincoln	40925		134	2 (4)	83 (32)	0 (0)	0.10%	38°29′7″N 95°33′17″W
Melvern	45725	Melvern	812	7 (18)	115 (44)	0 (0)	0.13%	38°30′8″N 95°38′50″W
Olivet	52725	Olivet	263	2 (5)	143 (55)	17 (7)	10.70%	38°29′53″N 95°44′51″W
Ridgeway	59825	Carbondale	2,661	25 (64)	108 (42)	2 (1)	2.00%	38°48′56″N 95°40′56″W
Scranton	63700	Scranton	1,273	14 (36)	92 (36)	1 (0)	0.91%	38°47′30″N 95°45′10″W
Superior	69500		293	3 (8)	93 (36)	0 (0)	0.30%	38°38′44″N 95°47′34″W
Valley Brook	73200	Lyndon	1,524	15 (38)	104 (40)	0 (0)	0.46%	38°36′44″N 95°40′35″W
Sources: "Census 2000 U.S. Gazetteer Files". U.S. Census Bureau, Geography Division. Archived from the original on August 2, 2002.

== See also ==
- Flint Hills Trail
- National Register of Historic Places listings in Osage County, Kansas
- Osage State Fishing Lake

Community information for Kansas

- Kansas locations by per capita income
- List of counties in Kansas
- List of townships in Kansas
- List of cities in Kansas
- List of unincorporated communities in Kansas
- List of ghost towns in Kansas
