= Lebo =

Lebo or LEBO may refer to

- Lebo, Kansas, a small town in Kansas, United States
  - Lebo High School in Kansas
  - Lebo-Waverly USD 243, a school district in Kansas
- Lebo, Missouri, an unincorporated community
- Lebo Formation, a geological formation in Montana, United States
- A short version of the South African given name Lebogang
- Lebo (surname)
- David Le Batard (LEBO), Cuban-American cartoon artist
- A derogatory ethnic slur for a person from Lebanon, especially a Lebanese Australian
