= Burlington High School (Kansas) =

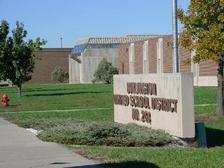
- Main Building from South-East

Location
- 830 Cross Street; Burlington, Kansas 66839; United States; 38°12′27″N 95°44′46″W

Information
- School type: Public
- School board: BOE Website
- School district: Burlington USD 244
- CEEB code: 170430
- Principal: Jodi Grover
- Staff: 22.60 (FTE)
- Faculty: 26
- Age: 14 to 18
- Enrollment: 256 (2023–2024)
- Student to teacher ratio: 11.33
- Language: English
- Campus type: Suburban
- Colors: Red, gray, black
- Song: Hail Alma Mater
- Fight song: Wildcat Victory
- Mascot: Wildcats
- Nickname: Cats
- Team name: Wildcats; Ladycats
- Rival: Yates Center
- Accreditation: North Central Association
- Newspaper: Cat Tracks
- Yearbook: Master Key
- Communities served: Burlington, New Strawn, parts of Coffey County
- Feeder schools: Burlington Middle School
- Affiliation: Tri-Valley League
- School Size: 3A
- Website: School Website

Burlington High School is a high school located in Burlington, Kansas, United States, serving students in grades 9–12, and operated by Burlington USD 244 school district. The school is the westernmost building in the northern education complex on the outer edge of the city limits. The school mascot is the Wildcat and the school colors are red, gray, and black.

== History ==
In 1996, a courtyard and gazebo in the center of the facility was enclosed and converted to computer technology labs. In 2005, an addition was made to the athletics portion of the campus by adding baseball and softball diamonds, so the team could play closer to the school. In 2007, an addition was made to the athletics portion of the campus by adding a wrestling room so the team could have a bigger facility to practice in. Over the last decade, several security measures have been enacted to protect the students and faculty in the wake of incidents such as Columbine, even though there has been no reported serious cause to believe similar events will happen.

== Campus ==
The front of the building houses the administration offices, band practice room and special services rooms. The school gymnasium is located on the western side of the main building. A wrestling wing is on the northwest corner of the school. The school also has a football field and track with a large red brick stadium and softball/baseball diamonds. To the east is the Middle School which houses grades 6 through 8. A courtyard and gazebo used to be in the center of the facility. However this was closed to the outside and turned into a technology lab and computer-aided drafting room.

== Demographics ==
=== Students ===
Burlington High attracts many transfer students due to its close proximity to Wolf Creek. During the refueling time period several families move in to help with the outage causing the Burlington, and the school student population to rise. Burlington High School is one of the largest 3A schools in the state of Kansas with a student population of 297. This occurred in 2003 after several large classes graduated without adequate replacements in the younger classes, dropping the district from 4A classification. As of the 2008 school year, the school went back up to a 4A being a very small one with only a few kids more than required for 3A.

=== Faculty ===
There are around 45 faculty members, 26 of which are teachers at Burlington High.

== Extracurricular activities ==
=== Athletics ===
The mascot of Burlington High is the Wildcats. The school offers many athletic programs including: football, wrestling, cross country, basketball, baseball, softball, track, golf, and volleyball. The basketball teams won the 2000 Kansas State Girls Basketball Championship, and the 2004 Kansas State Boys Basketball Championship, along with multiple showings in the tournament over the years.

=== State championships ===
State Championships
Season	Sport	Number of Championships	Year	Notes
Winter	Basketball, Boys	1	2004	Class 3A
Winter	Basketball, Girls	2	2000	Class 4A
Winter	Basketball, Girls	2	2013	Class 3A
Total		3		

=== Clubs ===
Burlington also offers Scholar's Bowl, drama, forensics, band, and vocal.

=== School publications ===
- The school newspaper is called Cat Tracks; it is run by Sandy Loucks.

== Notable alumni ==
- Tyrel Reed, former professional basketball player for RBC Verviers-Pepinster in Belgium, played collegiately for the Kansas Jayhawks

== See also ==
- List of high schools in Kansas
- List of unified school districts in Kansas
