= Pottawatomie (disambiguation) =

The Potawatomi (also known as Pottawatomie) are a group of Native American people, see Potawatomi Indians. It may also refer to

== Locations ==
- Pottawatomie County
  - Pottawattamie County, Iowa
  - Pottawatomie County, Kansas
  - Pottawatomie County, Oklahoma
- Pottawatomie Township, Coffey County, Kansas
- Pottawatomie Township, Franklin County, Kansas
- Pottawattamie Park, Indiana, a town
- Pottawatomie Light, a lighthouse in Wisconsin

== Events ==
- Pottawatomie Trail of Death (1838), the forced removal of Potawatomi Indians
- Pottawatomie Massacre (1856), during Bleeding Kansas
  - Pottawatomie Rifles, an abolitionist militia
