= Neosho Township =

Neosho Township may refer to the following townships in the United States:

- Neosho Township, Cherokee County, Kansas
- Neosho Township, Coffey County, Kansas
- Neosho Township, Newton County, Missouri
