= Ottumwa Township, Kansas =

Ottumwa Township
- Township
- Location in Coffey County
- Coordinates: 38°16′55″N 095°45′26″W
- Country: United States
- State: Kansas
- County: Coffey

Area
  - Total: 52.80 sq mi (136.76 km^{2})
  - Land: 46.96 sq mi (121.63 km^{2})
  - Water: 5.84 sq mi (15.13 km^{2}) 11.06%
- Elevation: 1,135 ft (346 m)

Population (2020)
  - Total: 716
  - Density: 15.2/sq mi (5.89/km^{2})
- GNIS feature ID: 0477462

Ottumwa Township is a township in Coffey County, Kansas, United States. As of the 2020 census, its population was 716.

== Geography ==
Ottumwa Township covers an area of 52.8 square miles (137 km^{2}) and contains one incorporated settlement, New Strawn. According to the USGS, it contains one cemetery, Bowman and Adgate.

The streams East Hickory Creek and West Hickory Creek flow through this township.
