= Pottawatomie Township =

Pottawatomie Township may refer to the following townships in the United States:

- Pottawatomie Township, Coffey County, Kansas
- Pottawatomie Township, Franklin County, Kansas
