= Le Roy Township, Kansas =

Le Roy Township
- Township
- Location in Coffey County
- Coordinates: 38°05′23″N 095°38′15″W
- Country: United States
- State: Kansas
- County: Coffey

Area
  - Total: 21.08 sq mi (54.59 km^{2})
  - Land: 21.00 sq mi (54.38 km^{2})
  - Water: 0.081 sq mi (0.21 km^{2}) 0.38%
- Elevation: 1,007 ft (307 m)

Population (2020)
  - Total: 553
  - Density: 26.3/sq mi (10.2/km^{2})
- GNIS feature ID: 0478092

Le Roy Township is a township in Coffey County, Kansas, United States. As of the 2020 census, its population was 553.

== Geography ==
Le Roy Township covers an area of 21.08 square miles (54.6 km^{2}) and contains one incorporated settlement, Le Roy. According to the USGS, it contains one cemetery, Le Roy.

The streams of Crooked Creek and Duck Creek run through this township.

== Transportation ==
Le Roy Township contains one airport or landing strip, Leroy Airport.
