= Liberty Township, Coffey County, Kansas =

Liberty Township
- Township
- Location in Coffey County
- Coordinates: 38°06′20″N 095°53′11″W
- Country: United States
- State: Kansas
- County: Coffey

Area
  - Total: 72.39 sq mi (187.48 km^{2})
  - Land: 72.0 sq mi (186.4 km^{2})
  - Water: 0.41 sq mi (1.07 km^{2}) 0.57%
- Elevation: 1,207 ft (368 m)

Population (2020)
  - Total: 550
  - Density: 7.6/sq mi (3.0/km^{2})
- GNIS feature ID: 0477852

Liberty Township is a township in Coffey County, Kansas, United States. As of the 2020 census, its population was 550.

== Geography ==
Liberty Township covers an area of 72.39 square miles (187.5 km^{2}) and contains one incorporated settlement, Gridley. According to the USGS, it contains four cemeteries: Apostolic, Fairhope, Gridley and Teachout.

The streams of Dinner Creek and Varvel Creek run through this township.
