= Waverly High School (Kansas) =

Waverly Junior-Senior High School

Location
- 607 Pearson; Waverly, Kansas 66871; 38°23′43.1053″N 95°36′0.867″W

Information
- Funding type: Public
- Status: Open
- Sister school: Lebo Junior-Senior High School
- School board: BOE website
- School district: Lebo–Waverly USD 243
- NCES District ID: 2012810
- CEEB code: 173090
- NCES School ID: 201281000176
- Principal: Bob Risch
- Teaching staff: 10.15 (FTE)
- Grades: 6-12
- Gender: coed
- Enrollment: 94 (2023–2024)
- Student to teacher ratio: 9.26
- Colors: Orange; Black
- Athletics: Yes
- Athletics conference: Lyon County League
- Sports: Yes
- Mascot: Bulldog
- Team name: Waverly Bulldogs
- Rival: Lebo High School
- Affiliations: KSHSAA
- Website: Waverly Jr/Sr High School

Waverly Junior-Senior High School is a public high school located in Waverly, Kansas, in the Lebo–Waverly USD 243 school district, serving students in grades 6–12. Waverly has an enrollment of approximately 94 students. The principal is Bob Risch. The school mascot is the Bulldogs and the school colors are orange and black.

== Extracurricular activities ==
The Bulldogs compete in the Lyon County League. The KSHSAA classification switches between 2A and 1A, the two lowest classes according to KSHSAA. The school also has a variety of organizations for the students to participate in.

=== Athletics ===
The Bulldogs compete in the Lyon County League and are classified as either 2A or 1A, two of the lowest classifications in Kansas according to KSHSAA. A majority of the sports are coached by the same coaches. Waverly Junior-Senior High School offers the following sports:

Fall Sports

- Cheerleading
- Cross Country
- Football
- Volleyball

Winter

- Boys' Basketball
- Girls' Basketball
- Cheerleading

Spring

- Boys' Track and Field
- Girls' Track and Field

=== Organizations ===
- Academic Club
- Art
- Band
- Choir
- Dance Team
- Family, Career and Community Leaders of America (FCCLA)
- Future Farmers of America (FFA)
- Future Business Leaders of America (FBLA)
- Journalism
- National Honor Society (NHS)
- Spanish
- Student Council (StuCo)
- Tech-Connect

== See also ==
- Lebo High School
- List of high schools in Kansas
- List of unified school districts in Kansas
