= Burlington Township, Kansas =

Burlington Township
- Township
- Location in Coffey County
- Coordinates: 38°10′13″N 095°46′31″W
- Country: United States
- State: Kansas
- County: Coffey

Area
  - Total: 31.4 sq mi (81.2 km^{2})
  - Land: 31.20 sq mi (80.82 km^{2})
  - Water: 0.15 sq mi (0.39 km^{2}) 0.48%
- Elevation: 1,076 ft (328 m)

Population (2020)
  - Total: 383
  - Density: 12.3/sq mi (4.74/km^{2})
- GNIS feature ID: 0477862

Burlington Township is a township in Coffey County, Kansas, United States. As of the 2020 census, its population was 383.

== Geography ==
Burlington Township covers an area of 31.35 square miles (81.2 km^{2}) and contains one incorporated settlement, Burlington (the county seat). According to the USGS, it contains four cemeteries: Calvary, Cola Hill, Graceland and Mount Hope.

The stream of Rock Creek runs through this township.
