= Avon Township, Kansas =

Avon Township, Kansas may refer to

- Avon Township, Coffey County, Kansas
- Avon Township, Sumner County, Kansas
