= Lebo, Kansas =

City in Coffey County, Kansas

- City
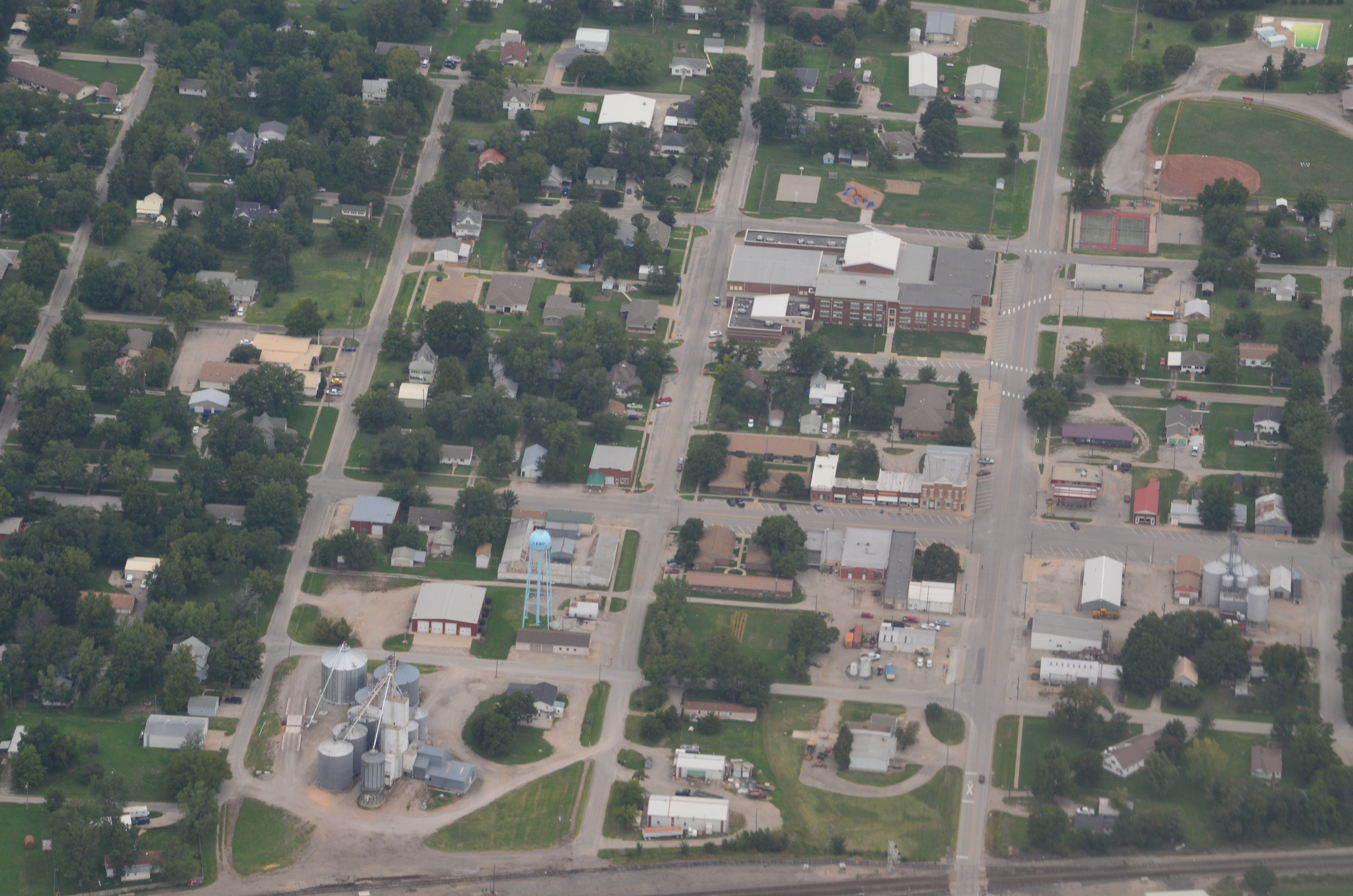
- Aerial view of Lebo (2014)

- Location within Coffey County and Kansas

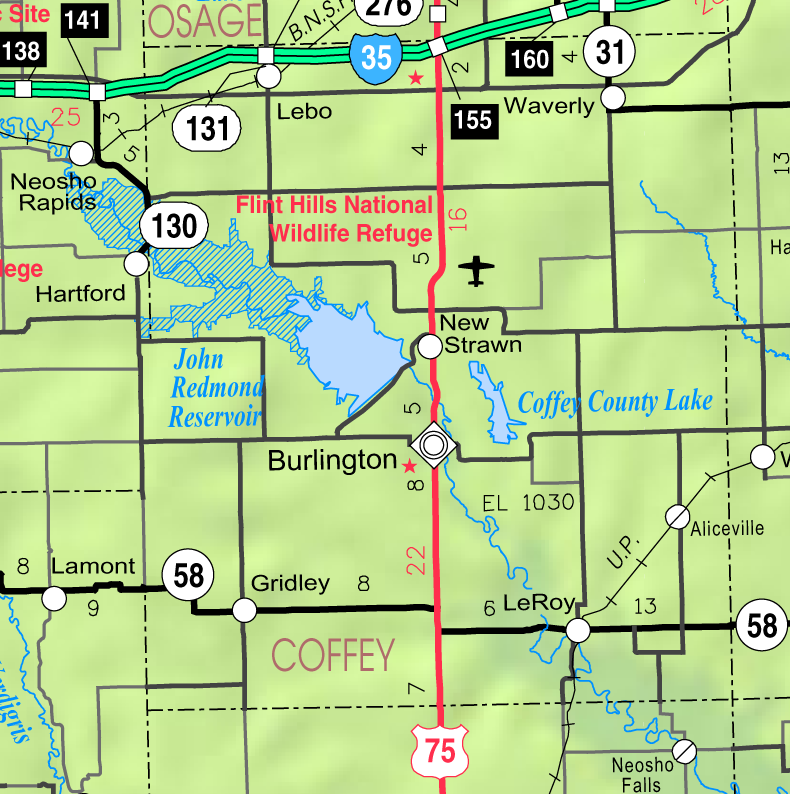
- KDOT map of Coffey County (legend)
- Coordinates: 38°24′57″N 95°51′44″W
- Country: United States
- State: Kansas
- County: Coffey
- Founded: 1883
- Incorporated: 1886

Area
  - Total: 1.05 sq mi (2.71 km^{2})
  - Land: 0.96 sq mi (2.48 km^{2})
  - Water: 0.089 sq mi (0.23 km^{2})
- Elevation: 1,165 ft (355 m)

Population (2020)
  - Total: 885
  - Density: 924/sq mi (357/km^{2})
- Time zone: UTC-6 (CST)
  - Summer (DST): UTC-5 (CDT)
- ZIP Code: 66856
- Area code: 620
- FIPS code: 20-39125
- GNIS ID: 2395666
- Website: leboks.org

Lebo is a city in Coffey County, Kansas, United States. As of the 2020 census, the population of the city was 885.

== History ==
Lebo was founded in 1883. It was named for Capt. Joe Lebo, a pioneer settler.

The first post office in Lebo was established on June 4, 1883.

== Geography ==
According to the United States Census Bureau, the city has a total area of 1.05 square miles (2.72 km^{2}), of which 0.96 square miles (2.49 km^{2}) is land and 0.09 square miles (0.23 km^{2}) is water.

=== Climate ===
The climate in this area is characterized by hot, humid summers and generally mild to cool winters. According to the Köppen Climate Classification system, Lebo has a humid subtropical climate, abbreviated "Cfa" on climate maps.

== Demographics ==
Historical population
Census	Pop.	Note	%±
1890	538		—
1900	605		12.5%
1910	560		−7.4%
1920	572		2.1%
1930	590		3.1%
1940	522		−11.5%
1950	575		10.2%
1960	498		−13.4%
1970	589		18.3%
1980	966		64.0%
1990	835		−13.6%
2000	961		15.1%
2010	940		−2.2%
2020	885		−5.9%
U.S. Decennial Census

=== 2020 census ===
The 2020 United States census counted 885 people, 367 households, and 272 families in Lebo. The population density was 924.8 per square mile (357.1/km^{2}). There were 393 housing units at an average density of 410.7 per square mile (158.6/km^{2}). The racial makeup was 94.69% (838) white or European American (92.88% non-Hispanic white), 0.45% (4) black or African-American, 0.56% (5) Native American or Alaska Native, 0.34% (3) Asian, 0.0% (0) Pacific Islander or Native Hawaiian, 0.68% (6) from other races, and 3.28% (29) from two or more races. Hispanic or Latino of any race was 3.28% (29) of the population.

Of the 367 households, 30.5% had children under the age of 18; 57.8% were married couples living together; 18.0% had a female householder with no spouse or partner present. 20.2% of households consisted of individuals and 10.6% had someone living alone who was 65 years of age or older. The average household size was 2.1 and the average family size was 2.6. The percent of those with a bachelor's degree or higher was estimated to be 16.9% of the population.

24.6% of the population was under the age of 18, 6.4% from 18 to 24, 21.4% from 25 to 44, 25.6% from 45 to 64, and 21.9% who were 65 years of age or older. The median age was 42.0 years. For every 100 females, there were 96.2 males. For every 100 females ages 18 and older, there were 102.7 males.

The 2016–2020 5-year American Community Survey estimates show that the median household income was $57,321 (with a margin of error of +/- $9,661) and the median family income was $71,250 (+/- $12,519). Males had a median income of $35,625 (+/- $11,377) versus $20,750 (+/- $8,433) for females. The median income for those above 16 years old was $31,959 (+/- $1,871). Approximately, 5.9% of families and 11.6% of the population were below the poverty line, including 13.0% of those under the age of 18 and 7.5% of those ages 65 or over.

=== 2010 census ===
As of the census of 2010, there were 940 people, 371 households, and 272 families living in the city. The population density was 979.2 inhabitants per square mile (378.1/km^{2}). There were 411 housing units at an average density of 428.1 per square mile (165.3/km^{2}). The racial makeup of the city was 98.9% White, 0.3% African American, 0.2% Native American, 0.1% from other races, and 0.4% from two or more races. Hispanic or Latino of any race were 1.4% of the population.

There were 371 households, of which 35.3% had children under the age of 18 living with them, 59.0% were married couples living together, 9.4% had a female householder with no husband present, 4.9% had a male householder with no wife present, and 26.7% were non-families. 22.4% of all households were made up of individuals, and 9.1% had someone living alone who was 65 years of age or older. The average household size was 2.53 and the average family size was 2.94.

The median age in the city was 40.4 years. 26.1% of residents were under the age of 18; 8.2% were between the ages of 18 and 24; 22.9% were from 25 to 44; 26% were from 45 to 64; and 16.8% were 65 years of age or older. The gender makeup of the city was 52.1% male and 47.9% female.

== Area attractions ==
Attractions of interest to travelers include Lebo Lake, John Redmond Reservoir, Melvern Reservoir, Coffey County Lake, Beto Junction, historic Arvonia town and the Coffey County Museum.

== Education ==
The community is served by Lebo–Waverly USD 243 public school district, and has two schools in the city: Lebo High School and Lebo Grade School.

== See also ==
- Melvern Lake
