= Star Township, Kansas =

Star Township
- Township
- Location in Coffey County
- Coordinates: 38°13′55″N 095°35′31″W
- Country: United States
- State: Kansas
- County: Coffey

Area
  - Total: 35.10 sq mi (90.92 km^{2})
  - Land: 34.70 sq mi (89.87 km^{2})
  - Water: 0.41 sq mi (1.05 km^{2}) 1.15%
- Elevation: 1,120 ft (340 m)

Population (2020)
  - Total: 147
  - Density: 4.24/sq mi (1.64/km^{2})
- GNIS feature ID: 0477476

Star Township is a township in Coffey County, Kansas, United States. As of the 2020 census, its population was 147.

== Geography ==
Star Township covers an area of 35.1 square miles (91 km^{2}) and contains no incorporated settlements. According to the USGS, it contains one cemetery, Star.
