= Tyrel Reed =

American basketball player (born 1989)

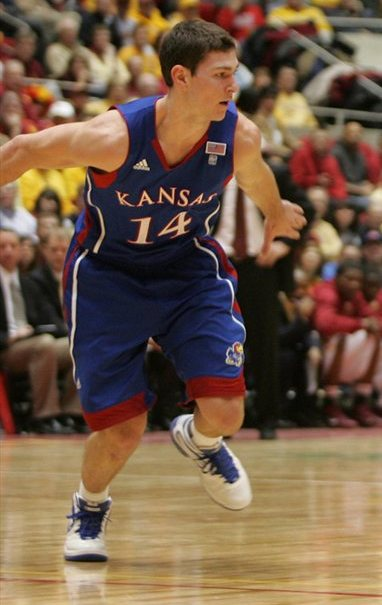

Personal information
- Born: April 8, 1989 (age 36) Eureka, Kansas, U.S.
- Listed height: 6 ft 3 in (1.91 m)
- Listed weight: 193 lb (88 kg)

Career information
- High school: Burlington (Burlington, Kansas)
- College: Kansas (2007–2011)
- NBA draft: 2011: undrafted
- Playing career: 2011–2011
- Position: Guard

Career history
- 2011: VOO Verviers-Pepinster

Career highlights
- Mr. Kansas Basketball (2007)

Tyrel Reed (born April 8, 1989) is an American former basketball player who played for University of Kansas. He is the winningest player in KU Jayhawks history, with a combined record of 132–17 record in his four seasons at the University of Kansas. Reed wrote a book, Reed All About It: Driven to be a Jayhawk, about his experience growing up in Kansas and playing with the Jayhawks. It was co-written by Tully Corcoran and published by Ascend Books.

== High school ==
In Reed's senior year of high school at Burlington High School, he averaged 26.4 points per game, 7.0 rebounds per game and 5.0 assists per game. This was good enough for him to be named Mr. Kansas Basketball as well as Kansas' Gatorade Player of the Year. Reed was also an outstanding Track and Field athlete, winning the state championship for long jump his senior year and also finishing second in the 400 meter dash.

== College career ==
=== Freshman season ===
Reed appeared in twenty-three games his freshman season, but only averaged 6.2 minutes per game and 2.0 points per game. In the 2008 NCAA tournament, he made an appearance in the final minute of the semi-final match-up against the North Carolina Tar Heels, but did not play in national championship game, which Kansas won.

=== Sophomore season ===
Reed saw an increase in playing time his sophomore season averaging 20.7 minutes per game and also started two games. Reed also increased his scoring average to 6.5 points per game.

=== Junior season ===
In his junior season, Reed appeared in all thirty-six games and also averaged 5.1 points per game in 15.6 minutes per game. Reed scored a season-high fifteen points against Kansas State in the Big 12 championship game. In the 2010 NCAA Men's Division I Basketball Tournament the first seed Jayhawks were upset by the ninth seed Northern Iowa Panthers in the round of thirty-two.

=== Senior season ===
In his senior season, Reed was an honorable All-Big 12 selection. He also averaged career highs in points per game (9.7), rebounds per game (3.1), assists per game (1.7), steals per game (1.5), and minutes per game (28.7). The Kansas Jayhawks lost to the VCU Rams in the Elite 8 of the 2011 NCAA Men's Division I Basketball Tournament. Reed scored nine points in the game, but only went 1–9 from the field and 1–7 for three-pointers.

== Professional career ==
Following the end of his college career, Reed signed with VOO Verviers-Pepinster of the Ethias League in Belgium. Terms of the deal were not disclosed. He was released in December 2011.

== Graduate school ==
Following his playing career, Reed attended graduate school at the University of Kansas Medical Center in Kansas City, Kansas. He began classes in summer of 2012 and graduated in May 2015 with a doctorate in physical therapy. He currently works as a physical therapist in Lawrence, KS. His wife, Jessica, is an occupational therapist at Lawrence Memorial Hospital.
