= LeRoy–Gridley USD 245 =

Public school district in LeRoy, Kansas

Address
- 1005 N. Main St. LeRoy, Kansas, 66857; United States
- Coordinates: 38°5′11.7774″N 95°38′1.2228″W

District information
- Type: Public
- Grades: K to 12
- Superintendent: Russell Mildward
- Schools: 3
- NCES District ID: 2008670

Other information
- Website: usd245ks.org

LeRoy–Gridley USD 245, also known as Southern Coffey County, is a public unified school district headquartered in LeRoy, Kansas, United States, serving the southern part of Coffey County. The district includes the communities of LeRoy, Gridley, Aliceville, and nearby rural areas. Enrollment for the 2012–13 school year was 216.

== Administration ==
The district is currently under the administration of principal Robert Dickinson.

== Schools ==
The school district operates the following schools:

- Southern Coffey County High School
- Southern Coffey County Junior High School
- Southern Coffey County Elementary School

== See also ==
- Kansas State Department of Education
- Kansas State High School Activities Association
- List of high schools in Kansas
- List of unified school districts in Kansas
