= Coffey County, Kansas =

County in Kansas, United States

- County
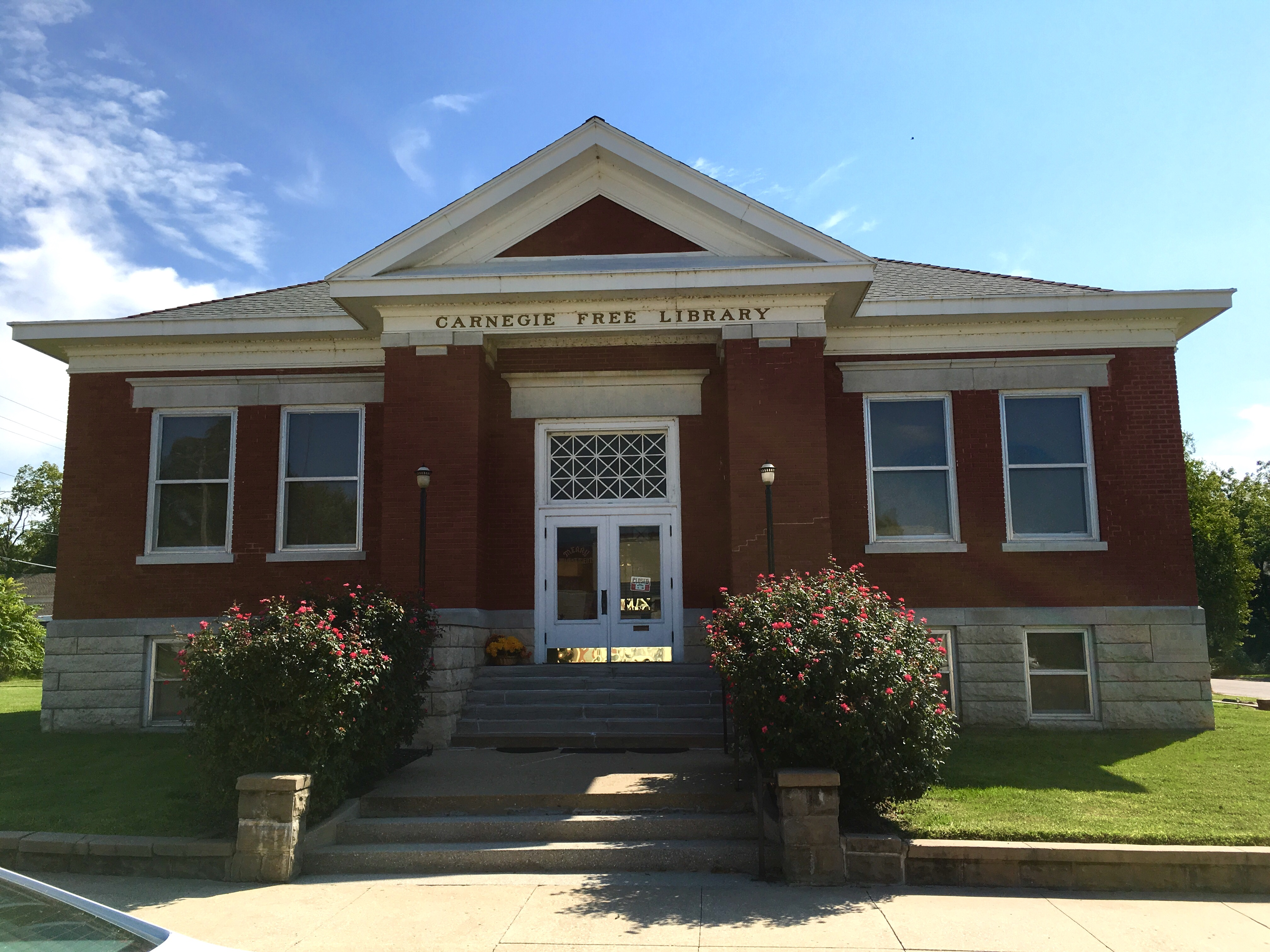
- Burlington Carnegie Free Library (2016)

- Location within the U.S. state of Kansas
- Country: United States
- State: Kansas
- Founded: August 25, 1855
- Named for: Asbury M. Coffey
- Seat: Burlington
- Largest city: Burlington

Area
  - Total: 654 sq mi (1,690 km^{2})
  - Land: 627 sq mi (1,620 km^{2})
  - Water: 27 sq mi (70 km^{2}) 4.2%

Population (2020)
  - Total: 8,360
  - Estimate (2025): 8,467 ▲
  - Density: 13.2/sq mi (5.1/km^{2})
- Time zone: UTC−6 (Central)
  - Summer (DST): UTC−5 (CDT)
- Area code: 620
- Congressional district: 2nd
- Website: CoffeyCountyKS.org

Coffey County is a county located in Eastern Kansas. Its county seat and most populous city is Burlington. As of the 2020 census, the county population was 8,360. It was named after A.M. Coffey, a territorial legislator and Free-Stater during Bleeding Kansas era.

== History ==
=== Early history ===
For many millennia, the Great Plains of North America was inhabited by nomadic Native Americans. From the 16th century to 18th century, the Kingdom of France claimed ownership of large parts of North America. In 1762, after the French and Indian War, France secretly ceded New France to Spain, per the Treaty of Fontainebleau.

=== 19th century ===
In 1802, Spain returned most of the land to France, but keeping title to about 7,500 square miles. In 1803, most of the land for modern day Kansas was acquired by the United States from France as part of the 828,000 square mile Louisiana Purchase for 2.83 cents per acre.

In 1854, the Kansas Territory was organized, then in 1861 Kansas became the 34th U.S. state. In 1855, Coffey County was established.

== Geography ==
According to the U.S. Census Bureau, the county has a total area of 654 square miles (1,690 km^{2}), of which 627 square miles (1,620 km^{2}) is land and 27 square miles (70 km^{2}) (4.2%) is water.

=== Adjacent counties ===
- Osage County (north)
- Franklin County (northeast)
- Anderson County (east)
- Allen County (southeast)
- Woodson County (south)
- Greenwood County (southwest)
- Lyon County (northwest)

=== Major highways ===
Sources: National Atlas, U.S. Census Bureau

- Interstate 35
- U.S. Route 50
- U.S. Route 75
- K-31
- K-58

=== National protected area ===
- Flint Hills National Wildlife Refuge (part)

== Demographics ==
Historical population
Census	Pop.	Note	%±
1860	2,842		—
1870	6,201		118.2%
1880	11,438		84.5%
1890	15,856		38.6%
1900	16,643		5.0%
1910	15,205		−8.6%
1920	14,254		−6.3%
1930	13,653		−4.2%
1940	12,278		−10.1%
1950	10,408		−15.2%
1960	8,403		−19.3%
1970	7,397		−12.0%
1980	9,370		26.7%
1990	8,404		−10.3%
2000	8,865		5.5%
2010	8,601		−3.0%
2020	8,360		−2.8%
2025 (est.)	8,467	▲	1.3%
U.S. Decennial Census; 1790-1960 1900-1990; 1990-2000 2010-2020

=== 2020 census ===
As of the 2020 census, the county had a population of 8,360. The median age was 44.7 years. 23.2% of residents were under the age of 18 and 22.6% of residents were 65 years of age or older. For every 100 females there were 98.2 males, and for every 100 females age 18 and over there were 94.8 males age 18 and over. 0.0% of residents lived in urban areas, while 100.0% lived in rural areas.

The racial makeup of the county was 93.0% White, 0.5% Black or African American, 0.4% American Indian and Alaska Native, 0.5% Asian, 0.0% Native Hawaiian and Pacific Islander, 0.6% from some other race, and 4.9% from two or more races. Hispanic or Latino residents of any race comprised 2.6% of the population.

There were 3,477 households in the county, of which 27.5% had children under the age of 18 living with them and 22.4% had a female householder with no spouse or partner present. About 28.8% of all households were made up of individuals and 14.8% had someone living alone who was 65 years of age or older.

There were 3,959 housing units, of which 12.2% were vacant. Among occupied housing units, 76.4% were owner-occupied and 23.6% were renter-occupied. The homeowner vacancy rate was 2.4% and the rental vacancy rate was 10.2%.

=== 2000 census ===
As of the 2000 census, there were 8,865 people, 3,489 households, and 2,477 families residing in the county. The population density was 14 people per square mile (5.4 people/km^{2}). There were 3,876 housing units at an average density of 6 per square mile (2.3/km^{2}). The racial makeup of the county was 96.95% White, 0.25% Black or African American, 0.52% Native American, 0.34% Asian, 0.01% Pacific Islander, 0.50% from other races, and 1.43% from two or more races. Hispanic or Latino of any race were 1.55% of the population.

There were 3,489 households, out of which 33.20% had children under the age of 18 living with them, 60.70% were married couples living together, 6.90% had a female householder with no husband present, and 29.00% were non-families. 26.00% of all households were made up of individuals, and 12.60% had someone living alone who was 65 years of age or older. The average household size was 2.49 and the average family size was 2.99.

In the county, the population was spread out, with 26.80% under the age of 18, 6.50% from 18 to 24, 26.40% from 25 to 44, 24.00% from 45 to 64, and 16.20% who were 65 years of age or older. The median age was 39 years. For every 100 females there were 96.20 males. For every 100 females age 18 and over, there were 92.50 males.

The median income for a household in the county was $37,839, and the median income for a family was $44,912. Males had a median income of $31,356 versus $20,666 for females. The per capita income for the county was $18,337. About 5.00% of families and 6.60% of the population were below the poverty line, including 5.00% of those under age 18 and 9.80% of those age 65 or over.

== Government ==
=== Presidential elections ===
Presidential election results

United States presidential election results for Coffey County, Kansas
Year	Republican		Democratic		Third party(ies)	
Year	No.	%	No.	%	No.	%
1888	1,970	52.59%	1,227	32.75%	549	14.66%
1892	1,769	47.53%	0	0.00%	1,953	52.47%
1896	2,000	46.84%	2,194	51.38%	76	1.78%
1900	2,159	50.46%	2,066	48.28%	54	1.26%
1904	2,164	59.39%	1,280	35.13%	200	5.49%
1908	2,094	53.38%	1,729	44.07%	100	2.55%
1912	681	18.73%	1,581	43.48%	1,374	37.79%
1916	2,799	45.57%	3,121	50.81%	222	3.61%
1920	3,370	64.20%	1,785	34.01%	94	1.79%
1924	3,552	62.47%	1,631	28.68%	503	8.85%
1928	4,342	73.81%	1,514	25.74%	27	0.46%
1932	2,707	43.77%	3,389	54.80%	88	1.42%
1936	3,900	59.29%	2,662	40.47%	16	0.24%
1940	4,164	64.26%	2,272	35.06%	44	0.68%
1944	3,461	67.28%	1,660	32.27%	23	0.45%
1948	2,945	61.20%	1,796	37.32%	71	1.48%
1952	3,731	74.78%	1,239	24.83%	19	0.38%
1956	3,286	72.24%	1,247	27.41%	16	0.35%
1960	2,925	69.69%	1,263	30.09%	9	0.21%
1964	1,998	55.41%	1,594	44.20%	14	0.39%
1968	2,223	63.06%	933	26.47%	369	10.47%
1972	2,667	75.70%	782	22.20%	74	2.10%
1976	2,145	56.70%	1,549	40.95%	89	2.35%
1980	2,491	69.16%	938	26.04%	173	4.80%
1984	3,063	74.00%	1,037	25.05%	39	0.94%
1988	2,581	66.69%	1,246	32.20%	43	1.11%
1992	1,824	42.44%	1,021	23.76%	1,453	33.81%
1996	2,369	57.92%	1,118	27.33%	603	14.74%
2000	2,700	66.83%	1,196	29.60%	144	3.56%
2004	3,259	73.93%	1,093	24.80%	56	1.27%
2008	3,054	72.16%	1,121	26.49%	57	1.35%
2012	2,903	74.32%	898	22.99%	105	2.69%
2016	3,050	74.98%	727	17.87%	291	7.15%
2020	3,489	76.43%	964	21.12%	112	2.45%
2024	3,371	77.02%	934	21.34%	72	1.64%

=== Laws ===
Following amendment to the Kansas Constitution in 1986, Coffey County remained a prohibition, or "dry", county until 2004, when voters approved the sale of alcoholic liquor by the individual drink with a 30 percent food sales requirement.

== Education ==
=== Unified school districts ===
They include:

- Lebo–Waverly USD 243
- Burlington USD 244
- LeRoy–Gridley USD 245 (Southern Coffey County)

School district office in neighboring county

- Southern Lyon County USD 252
- Garnett USD 365

== Communities ==
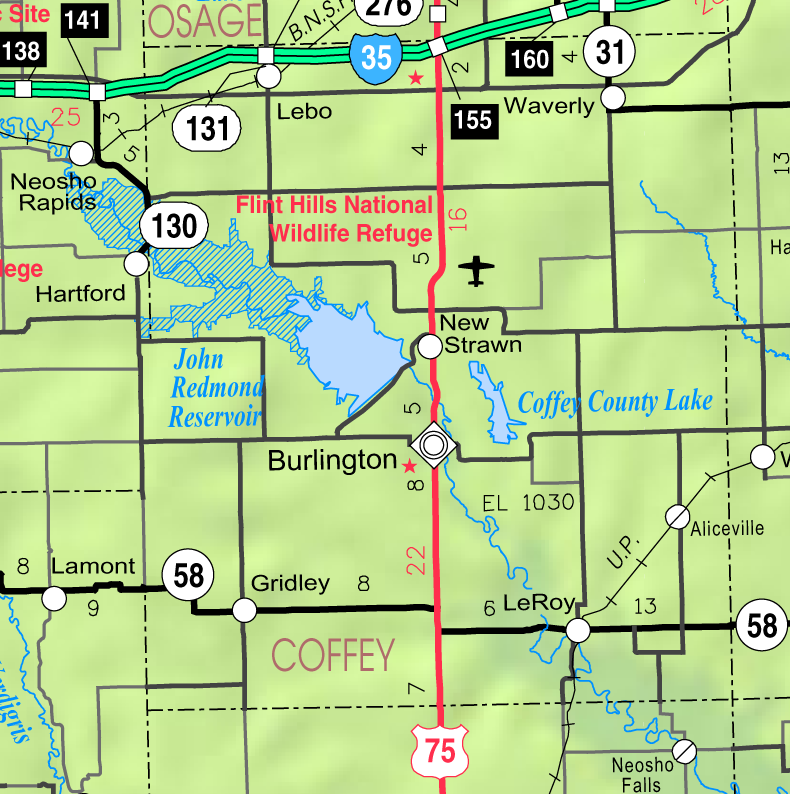
2005 map of Coffey County (map legend)

List of townships / incorporated cities / unincorporated communities / extinct former communities within Coffey County.

=== Cities ===
- Burlington (county seat)
- Gridley
- Lebo
- LeRoy
- New Strawn
- Waverly

=== Unincorporated communities ===
- Agricola
- Aliceville
- Halls Summit
- Ottumwa
- Sharpe

=== Townships ===
Coffey County is divided into fourteen townships. The city of Burlington is considered governmentally independent and is excluded from the census figures for the townships. In the following table, the population center is the largest city (or cities) included in that township's population total, if it is of a significant size.

Township	FIPS	Population center	Population	Population density /km^{2} (/sq mi)	Land area km^{2} (sq mi)	Water area km^{2} (sq mi)	Water %	Geographic coordinates
Avon	03550		183	2 (6)	80 (31)	0 (0)	0.40%	38°10′1″N 95°35′16″W
Burlington	09425		300	4 (10)	81 (31)	0 (0)	0.48%	38°10′40″N 95°45′18″W
Hampden	29775		114	2 (5)	56 (22)	20 (8)	26.43%	38°12′14″N 95°42′10″W
Key West	36650		237	2 (5)	123 (48)	1 (0)	0.68%	38°23′53″N 95°44′50″W
Le Roy	39675		669	12 (32)	54 (21)	0 (0)	0.39%	38°5′2″N 95°38′5″W
Liberty	39925		634	3 (9)	186 (72)	1 (0)	0.57%	38°6′0″N 95°53′7″W
Lincoln	40550		1,268	7 (18)	181 (70)	3 (1)	1.60%	38°23′24″N 95°52′34″W
Neosho	49750		140	1 (3)	124 (48)	0 (0)	0.34%	38°5′38″N 95°44′1″W
Ottumwa	53700		740	6 (16)	122 (47)	15 (6)	11.06%	38°16′54″N 95°44′34″W
Pleasant	56225		272	2 (4)	158 (61)	18 (7)	10.40%	38°13′57″N 95°53′38″W
Pottawatomie	57200		217	2 (4)	140 (54)	1 (0)	0.87%	38°17′28″N 95°35′20″W
Rock Creek	60500		1,025	7 (19)	140 (54)	1 (1)	1.00%	38°24′4″N 95°35′26″W
Spring Creek	67375		118	1 (3)	90 (35)	1 (0)	0.76%	38°5′31″N 95°34′50″W
Star	68000		158	2 (5)	90 (35)	1 (0)	1.15%	38°13′40″N 95°36′27″W
Sources: "Census 2000 U.S. Gazetteer Files". U.S. Census Bureau, Geography Division. Archived from the original on August 2, 2002.

== Notable people ==
- Alan L. Hart (1890–1962), transgender physician, radiologist, tuberculosis researcher, writer, and novelist

== See also ==
Community information for Kansas

- Kansas locations by per capita income
- List of counties in Kansas
- List of townships in Kansas
- List of cities in Kansas
- List of unincorporated communities in Kansas
- List of ghost towns in Kansas
