= Spring Creek Township, Coffey County, Kansas =

Spring Creek Township
- Township
- Location in Coffey County
- Coordinates: 38°05′25″N 095°33′51″W
- Country: United States
- State: Kansas
- County: Coffey

Area
  - Total: 34.97 sq mi (90.56 km^{2})
  - Land: 34.70 sq mi (89.87 km^{2})
  - Water: 0.27 sq mi (0.69 km^{2}) 0.76%
- Elevation: 1,037 ft (316 m)

Population (2020)
  - Total: 123
  - Density: 3.54/sq mi (1.37/km^{2})
- GNIS feature ID: 0478091

Spring Creek Township is a township in Coffey County, Kansas, United States. As of the 2020 census, its population was 123.

== Geography ==
Spring Creek Township covers an area of 34.96 square miles (90.5 km^{2}) and contains no incorporated settlements. According to the USGS, it contains three cemeteries: Logue, Stoeltzing and Wooster.

The streams of Bowmans Branch and Loss Creek run through this township.
