= Aliceville, Kansas =

Unincorporated community in Coffey County, Kansas

Coordinates: 38°09′16″N 95°33′07″W

Aliceville is an unincorporated community in Coffey County, Kansas, United States. It is located at the intersection of 9th Rd SE and Wayside Rd SE.

== History ==
A post office was established in Aliceville in 1883, and remained in operation until it was discontinued in 1994.

== Education ==
The community is served by LeRoy–Gridley USD 245 public school district.
