= Ottumwa, Kansas =

Unincorporated community in Coffey County, Kansas

Coordinates: 38°16′40″N 95°47′56″W

Ottumwa is an unincorporated community in Coffey County, Kansas, United States. It is located along Iris Rd on the north side of John Redmond Reservoir.

== History ==
A post office was established in Ottumwa in 1857, and remained in operation until it was discontinued in 1906.

== Education ==
The community is served by Burlington USD 244 public school district.
