= Berserk Bear =

Russian cyber espionage group

- Type: Advanced persistent threat
- Purpose: Cyberespionage, cyberwarfare
- Region served: Russia
- Methods: Malware
- Official language: Russian
- Parent organization: FSB
- Formerly called: Crouching Yeti; Dragonfly; Dragonfly 2.0; DYMALLOY; Energetic Bear; Havex; IRON LIBERTY; Koala; TeamSpy

Berserk Bear (also known as BROMINE, Crouching Yeti, Dragonfly, Dragonfly 2.0, DYMALLOY, Energetic Bear, Ghost Blizzard, Havex, IRON LIBERTY, Koala, or TeamSpy) is a Russian cyber espionage group, sometimes known as an advanced persistent threat. According to the United States government, the group is composed of "FSB hackers", either those directly employed by the FSB or Russian civilian, criminal hackers coerced into contracting as FSB hackers while still freelancing or moonlighting as criminal hackers. Four accused Berserk Bear participants, three FSB staff and one civilian, have been indicted in the United States and are regarded by the United States Department of Justice as fugitives.

== Activities ==
Berserk Bear specializes in compromising utilities infrastructure, especially that belonging to companies responsible for water or energy distribution. It has performed these activities in at least Germany and the U.S. These operations are targeted towards surveillance and technical reconnaissance.

Berserk Bear has also targeted many state, local, and tribal government and aviation networks in the U.S., and as of October 1, 2020, had exfiltrated data from at least two victim servers. In particular, Berserk Bear is believed to have infiltrated the computer network of the city of Austin, Texas, during 2020.

The group is capable of producing its own advanced malware, although it sometimes seeks to mimic other hacking groups and conceal its activities.

== Indictments unsealed in 2022 ==
In 2021 federal grand juries in the United States indicted three personnel of the Russian Federal Security Service (FSB) and a civilian from the Central Scientific Research Institute of Chemistry and Mechanics (CNIIHM). These indictments were kept under seal until March 2022 when the United States publicly named the defendants and treated them as fugitives.

=== Evgeny Gladkikh ===
Evgeny Gladkikh (Russian: Евгений Гладких) is accused of targeting network-connected safety equipment with the intent to gain the capability to sabotage them. He was indicted in the U.S. District Court for the District of Columbia.

=== "Center 16" defendants ===
The indictment in the case United States v. Akulov, et al. is focused on members of a team within "Center 16" (Russian: 16-й Центр) (Note: "Center 16" is the translation contained within the indictments. Elsewhere, the Estonian Foreign Intelligence Service refers to the unit as "16th Centre".) an FSB component also known as Military Unit 71330 (Russian: Bойсковая часть B/Ч 71330).

The British Foreign Office states that the full name of Center 16 is "Radio-Electronic Intelligence by Means of Communication" (TsRRSS); Russian: Центр радиоэлектронной разведки на средствах связи (ЦPPCC).

The U.S. v. Akulov case was filed within the United States District Court for the District of Kansas. The named defendants are:

- Pavel Aleksandrovich Akulov (Russian: Павел Александрович Акулов, born 2 July 1985) is described as a military officer assigned to Military Unit 71330, who held the rank of lieutenant as of 2013. Akulov is described as conducting surveillance and reconnaissance supporting the targeting of the Wolf Creek Generating Station computer network.
- Mikhail Mikhailovich Gavrilov (Russian: Михаил Михайлович Гаврилов, born 7 November 1979) is described as Russian military intelligence officer assigned to Military Unit 71330. He has held the rank of captain and major. He is described as conducting computer intrusions into the computer networks of Wolf Creek and another unnamed entity ("Company 7") used to access energy, utility and critical infrastructure webmail login webpages.
- Marat Valeryevich Tyukov (Russian: Марат Валерьевич Тюков, born 17 November 1982) is described as a Russian military intelligence officer assigned to Military Unit 71330. He is alleged to have gained unauthorized access to a server owned by an unnamed entity ("Company One") that was used for command and control infrastructure. He is also accused of tampering with updates to industrial control software which affected power and energy companies globally.

=== FBI and Department of State designation ===
The U.S. State Department Rewards for Justice Program is offering $10 million for tips that lead to the apprehension of the four named "Berserk Bear" suspects.

Wanted Posters
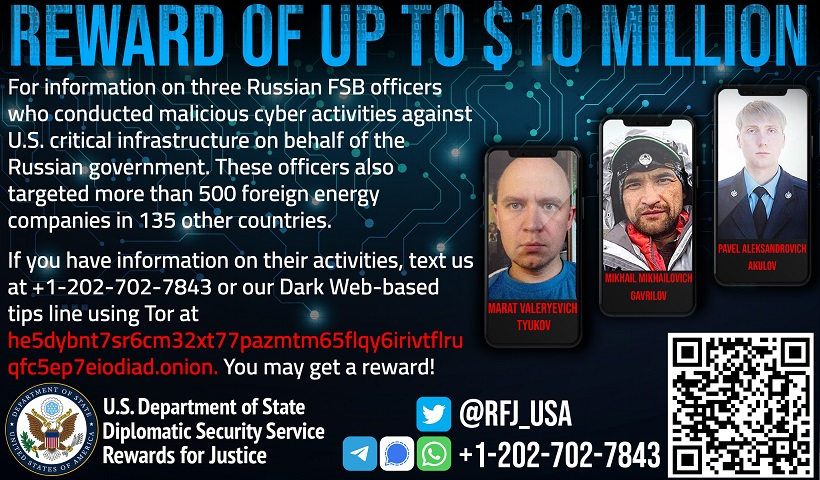
English language reward poster for Pavel Aleksandrovich Akulov, Mikhail Mikhailovich Gavrilov, and Marat Valeryevich Tyukov

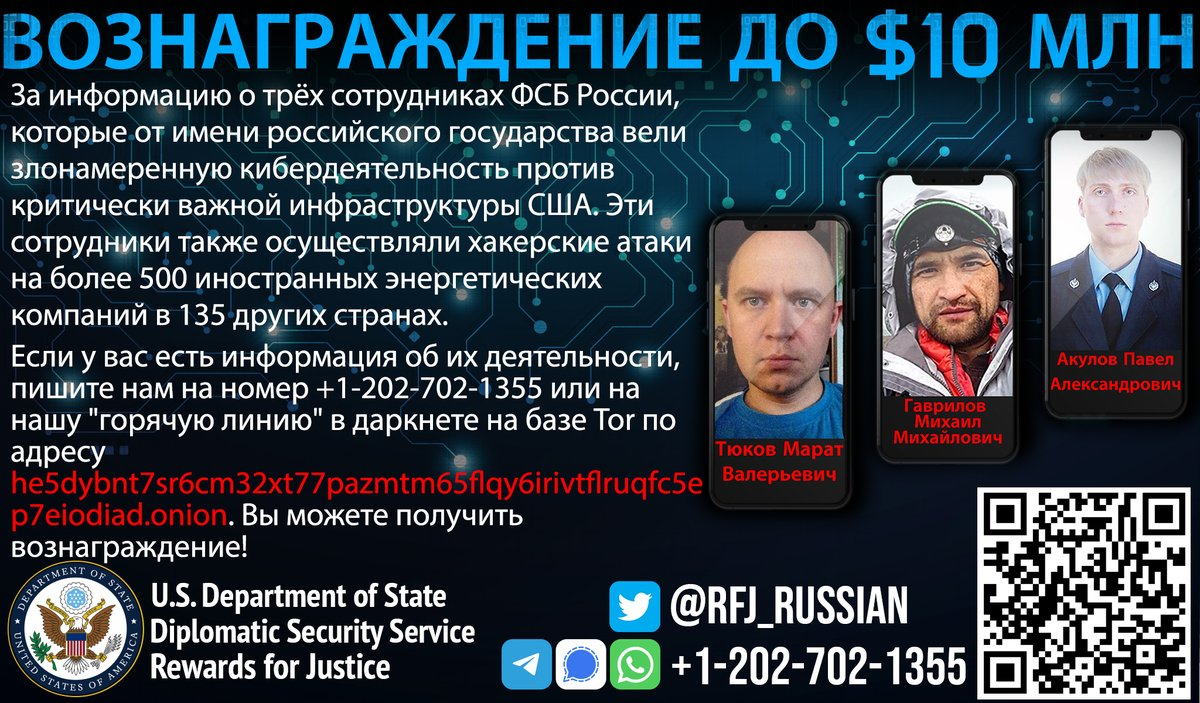
Russian language reward poster for Pavel Aleksandrovich Akulov, Mikhail Mikhailovich Gavrilov, and Marat Valeryevich Tyukov

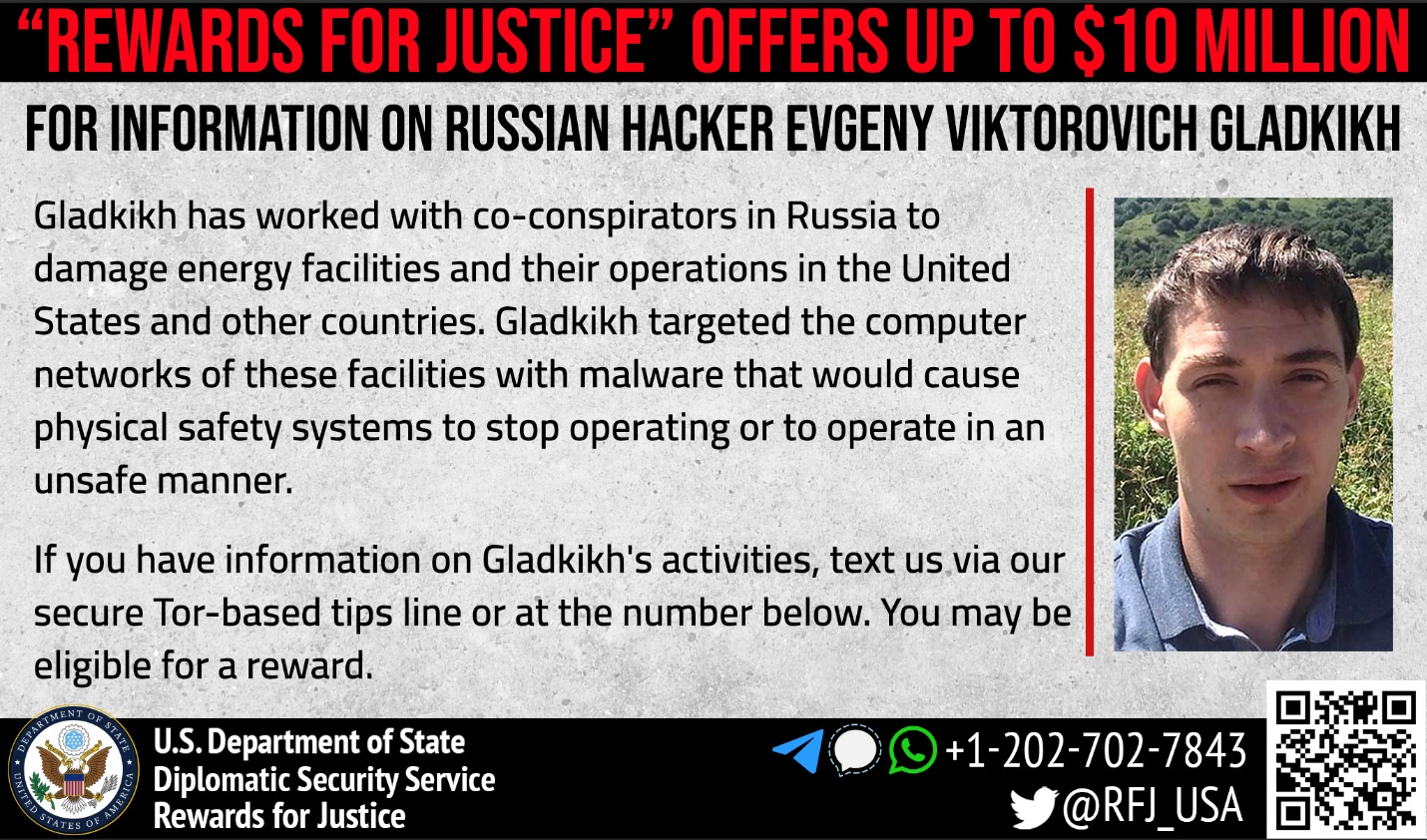
English language reward poster for Evgeny Viktorovich Gladkikh

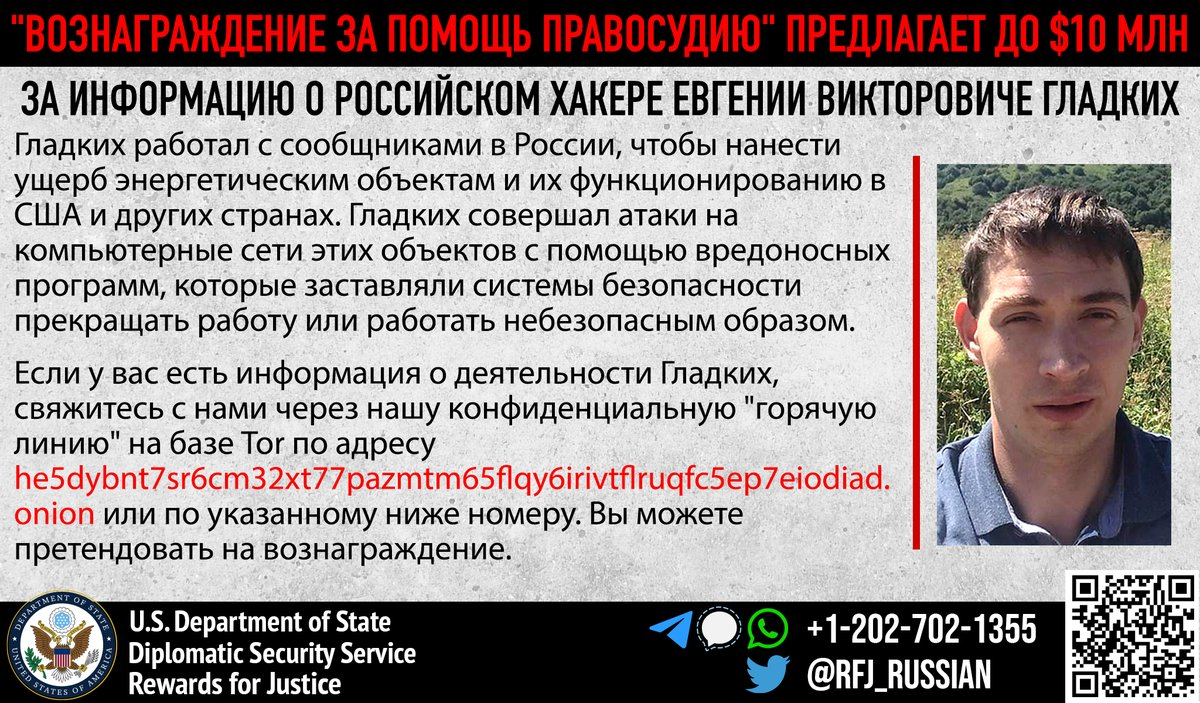
Russian language reward poster for Evgeny Viktorovich Gladkikh

== See also ==
- 2020 United States federal government data breach
- Cozy Bear
- Fancy Bear
