= Pleasant Township, Coffey County, Kansas =

Pleasant Township
- Township
- Location in Coffey County
- Coordinates: 38°12′50″N 095°52′36″W
- Country: United States
- State: Kansas
- County: Coffey

Area
  - Total: 68.13 sq mi (176.45 km^{2})
  - Land: 61.0 sq mi (158.1 km^{2})
  - Water: 7.08 sq mi (18.35 km^{2}) 10.4%
- Elevation: 1,129 ft (344 m)

Population (2020)
  - Total: 256
  - Density: 4.19/sq mi (1.62/km^{2})
- GNIS feature ID: 0477444

Pleasant Township is a township in Coffey County, Kansas, United States. As of the 2020 census, its population was 256.

== Geography ==
Pleasant Township covers an area of 68.13 square miles (176.5 km^{2}) and contains no incorporated settlements. According to the USGS, it contains three cemeteries: Bailey, Baker and Strawn.

The streams of Buffalo Creek, Eagle Creek, Fourmile Creek, Jacobs Creek and Otter Creek run through this township.

== Transportation ==
Pleasant Township contains one airport or landing strip, Burlington Municipal Airport.
