= Hampden Township, Kansas =

Hampden Township
- Township
- Location in Coffey County
- Coordinates: 38°11′35″N 095°42′06″W
- Country: United States
- State: Kansas
- County: Coffey

Area
  - Total: 29.55 sq mi (76.54 km^{2})
  - Land: 21.74 sq mi (56.31 km^{2})
  - Water: 7.81 sq mi (20.23 km^{2}) 26.43%
- Elevation: 1,060 ft (323 m)

Population (2020)
  - Total: 145
  - Density: 6.67/sq mi (2.58/km^{2})
- GNIS feature ID: 0477463

Hampden Township is a township in Coffey County, Kansas, United States. As of the 2020 census, its population was 145.

== Geography ==
Hampden Township covers an area of 29.55 square miles (76.5 km^{2}) and contains no incorporated settlements. According to the USGS, it contains two cemeteries: Sherwood and Stringtown.

Mathias Lake is within this township. The stream of Wolf Creek runs through this township.

Wolf Creek Generating Station, a 1250MW nuclear power plant, operates here.

== Demographics ==
According to the 2010 census, 128 people lived in Hampden Township. The population density was 1.67 inhabitants per square kilometer. The racial makeup of the township was 98.44% White, 0.78% African American, and 0.78% from two or more races. Hispanic or Latino people of any race made up 0.78% of the population.

== Transportation ==
Hampden Township contains one airport or landing strip, Wolf Creek Airport.
