= Wolf Creek Generating Station =

Nuclear power plant near Burlington, Kansas, US

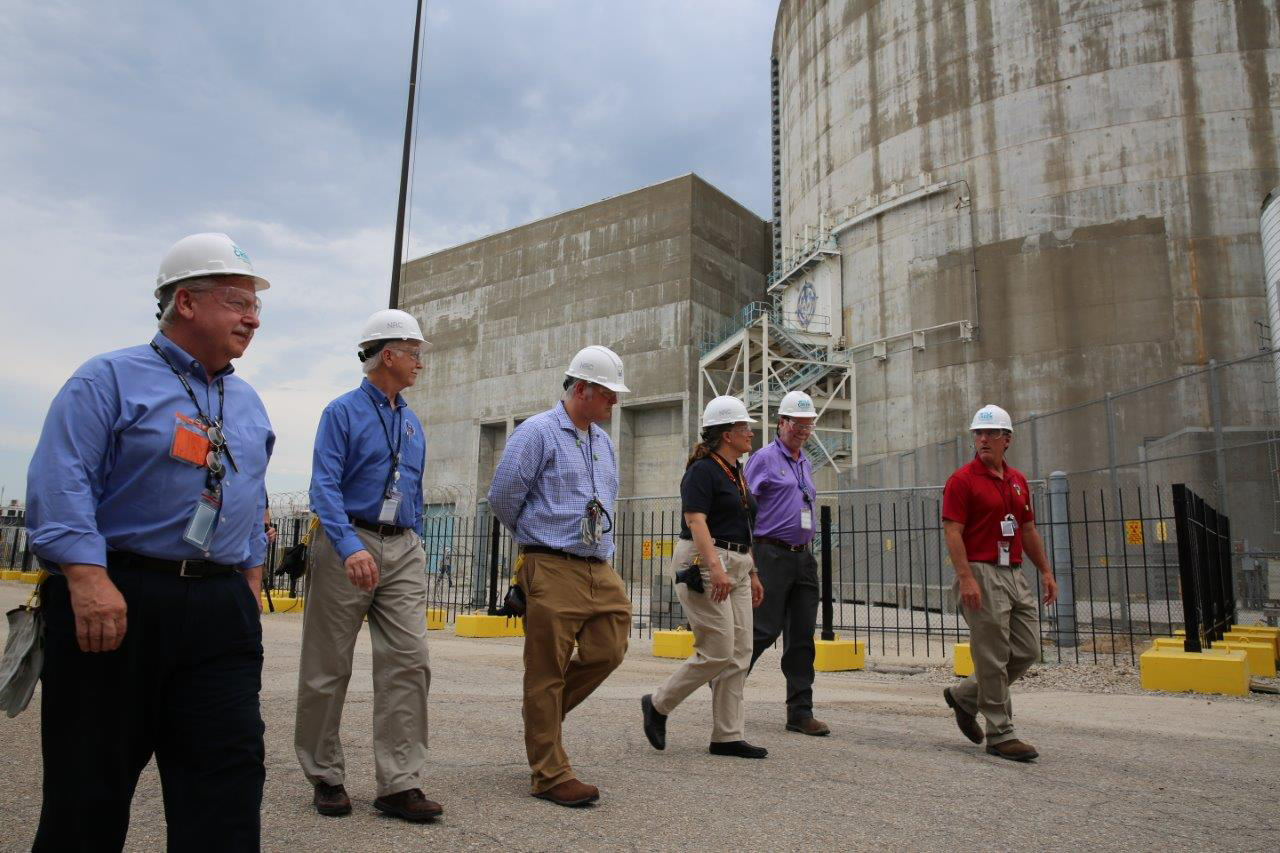
- WCNOC personal and NRC commissioner Annie Caputo on a facility tour.
- Country: United States
- Location: Hampden Township, Coffey County, near Burlington, Kansas
- Coordinates: 38°14′20″N 95°41′20″W
- Status: Operational
- Construction began: May 30, 1977
- Commission date: September 3, 1985; 41 years ago
- Construction cost: $5.771 billion (2007 USD) ($9 billion in 2025 dollars)
- Owners: Evergy (94%); Kansas Electric Power Cooperative (6%)
- Operator: Wolf Creek Nuclear Operating Corporation (WCNOC)
- Employees: ~750

Nuclear power station
- Reactor type: PWR
- Reactor supplier: Westinghouse
- Cooling source: Coffey County Lake (5,090 acres (2,060 ha), pumped from the John Redmond Reservoir and the Neosho River)
- Thermal capacity: 1 × 3565 MW_{th}

Power generation
- Units operational: 1 × 1200 MW
- Make and model: WH 4-loop (DRYAMB) SNUPPS
- Nameplate capacity: 1200 MW
- Capacity factor: 101.29% (2017); 84.90% (lifetime)
- Annual net output: 10,648 GWh (2017)

External links
- Website: wolfcreeknuclear.com

Wolf Creek Generating Station is a nuclear power plant located near Burlington, Kansas. It occupies 9,818 acres (39.73 km^{2}) of the total 11,800 acres (4,800 ha) controlled by the owner. Its namesake, Wolf Creek, was dammed to create Coffey County Lake (formerly Wolf Creek Lake), and provides water for the condensers.

== History ==
Construction started on May 30, 1977 and it was commissioned on September 3, 1985, at a cost of US$8.88 Billion (in 2025 value).

This plant has one Westinghouse pressurized water reactor that came online on June 4, 1985. The reactor was rated at 1,170 MW(e). A new turbine generator rotor was installed in 2011 that increased electrical output to approximately 1250 MW(e). The reactor output remained unchanged at 3565 MW (th).

On October 4, 2006, the operator applied to the Nuclear Regulatory Commission (NRC) for a renewal and extension of the plant's operating license. The NRC granted the renewal on November 20, 2008, extending the license from forty years to sixty.

On January 13, 2012, at 2 p.m., due to a breaker failure and an unexplained loss of power to an electrical transformer, the plant experienced an automatic reactor trip and loss of offsite power that lasted 3 hours.

The nuclear plant was a target of an unsuccessful cyberattack by hackers in 2017, leading to indictments in 2021. (Note: The attack was led by the FSB's Centre 16L military unit 71330 which collects radio-electronic intelligence on communications facilities and is also known as Energetic bear, Berserk Bear, Dragonfly, IRON LIBERTY, CASSTLE, CROUCHING YETI, DYMALLOY, TG-4192, Snake, Venomous Bear, Turla, Uroboros. In 2003, the 16th Center military unit 71330 Center for Electronic Intelligence on Communications Equipment (CRRSS) or (TsRRSS) (Russian: 16-й Центр — Центр радиоэлектронной разведки на средствах связи (ЦРРСС)), which is the main structure for internet operations outside Russia and is responsible for intercepting, decrypting and processing electronic communications, is located in Moscow at Pechatnikov Lane, 13 BLDG. 1 with Service No 1 of military unit 71330, which is engaged in planting and other technical means of penetration into foreign missions, located in St. Petersburg at Fontanka River Embankment, 100/letter A.) FSB's 16th Center military unit 71330 associated Russian hacker groups Energetic Bear, Berserk Bear and Crouching Yeti were associated with the attacks at Wolf Creek.

== Electricity production ==
Generation (MWh) of Wolf Creek Generating Station
Year	Jan	Feb	Mar	Apr	May	Jun	Jul	Aug	Sep	Oct	Nov	Dec	Annual (Total)
2001	888,118	803,086	833,873	855,348	878,063	853,966	873,972	874,542	853,335	887,293	857,462	887,593	10,346,651
2002	888,357	799,266	608,945	41,519	623,618	849,793	872,827	873,897	850,467	886,975	858,367	887,671	9,041,702
2003	831,072	801,210	885,555	854,714	882,299	850,274	872,780	805,442	848,540	462,620	-12,790	807,951	8,889,667
2004	883,896	721,298	881,977	853,917	879,963	846,910	837,005	810,094	842,667	833,054	856,664	885,291	10,132,736
2005	618,685	716,081	884,712	209,235	329,357	846,487	869,375	871,289	847,341	884,564	857,647	886,172	8,820,945
2006	886,275	800,601	887,370	855,828	883,329	846,602	869,974	869,842	847,422	155,136	560,443	887,447	9,350,269
2007	887,999	801,514	881,725	858,366	879,108	847,151	870,017	866,697	848,194	882,895	859,137	886,333	10,369,136
2008	718,760	827,848	463,799	-8,726	437,666	846,724	870,912	865,376	847,526	883,317	858,061	885,897	8,497,160
2009	885,692	797,548	872,111	786,064	819,918	843,949	869,102	700,728	848,675	242,473	213,432	888,856	8,768,548
2010	882,985	803,221	653,886	857,453	883,604	841,746	863,933	865,496	847,441	426,678	855,523	773,746	9,555,712
2011	883,547	796,991	498,103	-6,128	-25,629	7,448	773,763	873,223	861,524	896,251	864,063	895,732	7,318,888
2012	357,418	-11,005	82,077	869,918	888,242	855,202	837,483	877,801	861,144	900,138	863,023	903,483	8,284,924
2013	901,523	72,505	-7,587	327,330	611,551	842,579	882,785	883,930	292,148	582,132	874,919	904,486	7,168,301
2014	900,328	816,789	184,526	-10,781	494,964	862,500	890,551	885,769	867,614	904,318	852,083	909,723	8,558,384
2015	909,980	786,680	-7,224	-16,253	761,833	862,928	885,723	887,146	864,625	904,321	880,443	909,976	8,630,178
2016	910,276	845,851	907,060	878,858	903,726	860,319	877,570	884,908	24,882	-5,464	245,456	912,600	8,246,042
2017	912,867	824,017	910,867	874,267	907,330	869,095	882,648	893,575	870,511	906,549	884,220	912,041	10,647,987
2018	912,386	822,973	875,324	-7,752	351,294	865,039	885,908	887,951	870,926	908,933	884,279	911,028	9,168,289
2019	911,787	823,970	911,644	881,581	906,465	870,229	890,153	893,065	570,296	-7,683	683,874	912,353	9,247,734
2020	911,525	791,946	911,466	882,418	906,774	867,876	889,607	892,895	871,477	908,720	840,655	907,123	10,582,482
2021	911,616	823,212	676,419	0	428,191	646,808	893,228	778,463	870,455	853,713	855,977	836,650	8,574,732
2022	913,572	801,347	857,428	825,608	899,673	867,172	763,282	890,127	869,681	135,914	251,685	906,470	8,981,959
2023	894,771	761,173	880,582	788,669	905,314	861,249	870,310	879,987	871,036	790,904	884,446	913,424	10,301,865
2024	912,547	854,149	784,864	-4,307	576,464	867,252	892,065	766,454	870,276	887,929	883,697	912,836	9,204,226
2025	909,829	823,776	911,641	869,636	906,588	868,962	888,015	892,628	864,509	22,345	399,330	911,781	9,269,040
2026	911,649	824,598	910,386	879,901	907,160	869,274	887,485	891,395					--

== Ownership ==
The Wolf Creek Nuclear Operating Corporation, a Delaware corporation, operates the power plant. The ownership is divided between the Evergy (94%), and Kansas Electric Power Cooperative, Inc. (6%).

== Surrounding population ==
The Nuclear Regulatory Commission defines two emergency planning zones around nuclear power plants: a plume exposure pathway zone with a radius of 10 miles (16 km), concerned primarily with exposure to, and inhalation of, airborne radioactive contamination, and an ingestion pathway zone of about 50 miles (80 km), concerned primarily with ingestion of food and liquid contaminated by radioactivity.

The 2010 U.S. population within 10 miles (16 km) of Wolf Creek was 5,466, a decrease of 2.8 percent in a decade, according to an analysis of U.S. Census data for MSNBC. The 2010 U.S. population within 50 miles (80 km) was 176,656, a decrease of 1.7 percent since 2000. Cities within 50 miles include Emporia (30 miles to city center).

== Seismic risk ==
The Nuclear Regulatory Commission's estimate of the risk each year of an earthquake intense enough to cause core damage to the reactor at Wolf Creek was 0.0019%, or 1 in 55,556, according to an NRC study published in August 2010.
