= Agricola, Kansas =

Unincorporated community in Coffey County, Kansas

Coordinates: 38°25′10″N 95°32′06″W

Agricola is an unincorporated community in Coffey County, Kansas, United States. It is located along Old Highway 50 and 27th Rd.

== History ==
Agricola was a station on the Atchison, Topeka and Santa Fe Railway.

Agricola had a post office from 1875 until 1974. The post office was originally called Hardpan for some time.

== Education ==
The community is served by Lebo–Waverly USD 243 public school district.
