= Southern Coffey County High School =

Southern Coffey County Junior-Senior High School

Location
- 1010 N Main St; LeRoy, Kansas 66857; United States of America; 38°5′11.7774″N 95°38′1.2228″W

Information
- Funding type: Public
- Opened: August 1, 1928
- Status: Open
- School district: LeRoy-Gridley USD 245
- NCES District ID: 2008670
- CEEB code: 171759
- NCES School ID: 200867000180
- Principal: Robert Dickinson
- Teaching staff: 6.60 (FTE)
- Grades: 9-12
- Gender: coed
- Enrollment: 38 (2023–2024)
- Student to teacher ratio: 5.76
- Colors: Blue; Yellow
- Athletics: Yes
- Athletics conference: Three Rivers League
- Sports: Yes
- Mascot: Titans
- Nickname: SCC
- Team name: SCC Titans
- Affiliations: KSHSAA
- Website: School Website

Southern Coffey County Junior-Senior High School is a public secondary school in LeRoy, Kansas, United States. It is operated by the LeRoy-Gridley USD 245 school district, and serves students in grades 7 to 12. SCC has an enrollment of approximately 118 students. The school mascot is the Titans and the school colors are blue and yellow. The school operates on a 4-day school week, with students only attending classes Monday through Thursday.

== Extracurricular activities ==
The Titans compete in the Three Rivers League. The KSHSAA classification is 1A-II, the lowest class according to KSHSAA. The school also has a variety of organizations for the students to participate in.

=== Athletics ===
The Titans compete in the Lyon County League and are classified 1A-Div. II, the lowest classification in Kansas according to KSHSAA. SCC High School offers the following sports:

Fall Sports

- Cheerleading
- Cross Country
- Football
- Volleyball

Winter

- Boys' Basketball
- Girls' Basketball
- Cheerleading

Spring

- Boys' Track and Field
- Girls' Track and Field

== See also ==
- List of high schools in Kansas
- List of unified school districts in Kansas
