= Sharpe, Kansas =

Unincorporated community in Coffey County, Kansas

Coordinates: 38°16′55″N 95°41′31″W

Sharpe is an unincorporated community in Coffey County, Kansas, United States. It is located at the intersection of 18th Rd NE and Oxen Rd NE.

== History ==
A post office was opened in Sharpe in 1890, and remained in operation until being discontinued in 1918.

== Education ==
The community is served by Burlington USD 244 public school district.
