= Neosho Township, Coffey County, Kansas =

Neosho Township
- Township
- Location in Coffey County
- Coordinates: 38°05′00″N 095°44′21″W
- Country: United States
- State: Kansas
- County: Coffey

Area
  - Total: 48.2 sq mi (124.8 km^{2})
  - Land: 48.02 sq mi (124.38 km^{2})
  - Water: 0.16 sq mi (0.42 km^{2}) 0.34%
- Elevation: 1,053 ft (321 m)

Population (2020)
  - Total: 109
  - Density: 2.27/sq mi (0.876/km^{2})
- GNIS feature ID: 0477863

Neosho Township is a township in Coffey County, Kansas, United States. As of the 2020 census, its population was 109.

== Geography ==
Neosho Township covers an area of 48.18 square miles (124.8 km^{2}) and contains no incorporated settlements. According to the USGS, it contains three cemeteries: Big Creek, Crandell and Lorenz Schlichter Memorial.

This township is bounded by the streams of Big Creek, Long Creek, North Big Creek, South Big Creek, and Turkey Creek.

== Transportation ==
Neosho Township contains one airport or landing strip, McMullen Airport.
