= Avon Township, Coffey County, Kansas =

Avon Township
- Township
- Location in Coffey County
- Coordinates: 38°10′10″N 095°35′31″W
- Country: United States
- State: Kansas
- County: Coffey

Area
  - Total: 31.06 sq mi (80.44 km^{2})
  - Land: 30.93 sq mi (80.12 km^{2})
  - Water: 0.12 sq mi (0.32 km^{2}) 0.4%
- Elevation: 1,053 ft (321 m)

Population (2020)
  - Total: 161
  - Density: 5.20/sq mi (2.01/km^{2})
- GNIS feature ID: 0477873

Avon Township is a township in Coffey County, Kansas, United States. As of the 2020 census, its population was 161.

== Geography ==
Avon Township covers an area of 31.06 square miles (80.4 km^{2}) and contains no incorporated settlements. According to the USGS, it contains five cemeteries: Altamont, Center Hill, Pleasant Hill, Quisling and Saint Johns.

The streams of Badger Creek, Scott Creek, Silver Creek and Tauckett Creek run through this township.
