= Waverly, Kansas =

City in Coffey County, Kansas

- City
- Location within Coffey County and Kansas

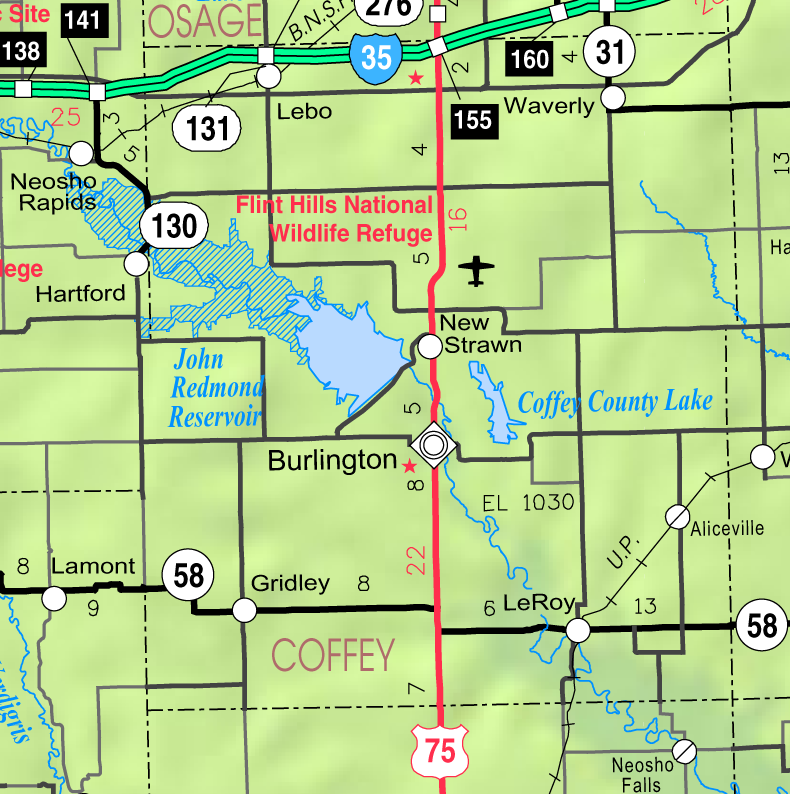
- KDOT map of Coffey County (legend)
- Coordinates: 38°23′46″N 95°36′17″W
- Country: United States
- State: Kansas
- County: Coffey

Government
  - Mayor: Jacob Marsh

Area
  - Total: 0.74 sq mi (1.92 km^{2})
  - Land: 0.73 sq mi (1.90 km^{2})
  - Water: 0.0077 sq mi (0.02 km^{2})
- Elevation: 1,116 ft (340 m)

Population (2020)
  - Total: 574
  - Density: 782/sq mi (302/km^{2})
- Time zone: UTC-6 (Central (CST))
  - Summer (DST): UTC-5 (CDT)
- ZIP Code: 66871
- Area code: 785
- FIPS code: 20-76050
- GNIS ID: 2397228
- Website: welcometowaverly.com

Waverly is a city in Coffey County, Kansas, United States. As of the 2020 census, the population of the city was 574.

== History ==
Waverly was founded in 1878. It was named by a pioneer settler for his hometown of Waverly, Indiana.

The first post office in Waverly was established on June 10, 1878.

== Geography ==
According to the United States Census Bureau, the city has a total area of 0.73 square miles (1.89 km^{2}), of which 0.72 square miles (1.86 km^{2}) is land and 0.01 square miles (0.03 km^{2}) is water.

=== Climate ===
The climate in this area is characterized by hot, humid summers and generally mild to cool winters. According to the Köppen Climate Classification system, Waverly has a humid subtropical climate, abbreviated "Cfa" on climate maps.

== Demographics ==
Historical population
Census	Pop.	Note	%±
1890	548		—
1900	586		6.9%
1910	751		28.2%
1920	619		−17.6%
1930	593		−4.2%
1940	566		−4.6%
1950	487		−14.0%
1960	381		−21.8%
1970	510		33.9%
1980	671		31.6%
1990	618		−7.9%
2000	589		−4.7%
2010	592		0.5%
2020	574		−3.0%
U.S. Decennial Census

=== 2020 census ===
The 2020 United States census counted 574 people, 221 households, and 147 families in Waverly. The population density was 784.2 per square mile (302.8/km^{2}). There were 254 housing units at an average density of 347.0 per square mile (134.0/km^{2}). The racial makeup was 94.43% (542) white or European American (92.86% non-Hispanic white), 1.05% (6) black or African-American, 0.0% (0) Native American or Alaska Native, 0.35% (2) Asian, 0.0% (0) Pacific Islander or Native Hawaiian, 0.0% (0) from other races, and 4.18% (24) from two or more races. Hispanic or Latino of any race was 2.96% (17) of the population.

Of the 221 households, 31.7% had children under the age of 18; 50.7% were married couples living together; 30.8% had a female householder with no spouse or partner present. 29.0% of households consisted of individuals and 17.2% had someone living alone who was 65 years of age or older. The average household size was 2.2 and the average family size was 2.9. The percent of those with a bachelor's degree or higher was estimated to be 23.5% of the population.

27.9% of the population was under the age of 18, 6.1% from 18 to 24, 22.3% from 25 to 44, 20.6% from 45 to 64, and 23.2% who were 65 years of age or older. The median age was 40.3 years. For every 100 females, there were 119.9 males. For every 100 females ages 18 and older, there were 130.0 males.

The 2016–2020 5-year American Community Survey estimates show that the median household income was $36,938 (with a margin of error of +/- $18,445) and the median family income was $68,500 (+/- $25,500). Males had a median income of $35,703 (+/- $3,813) versus $35,234 (+/- $9,393) for females. The median income for those above 16 years old was $35,469 (+/- $2,869). Approximately, 17.3% of families and 14.3% of the population were below the poverty line, including 24.5% of those under the age of 18 and 8.7% of those ages 65 or over.

=== 2010 census ===
As of the census of 2010, there were 592 people, 229 households, and 147 families living in the city. The population density was 822.2 inhabitants per square mile (317.5/km^{2}). There were 274 housing units at an average density of 380.6 per square mile (147.0/km^{2}). The racial makeup of the city was 96.5% White, 0.7% Native American, 0.2% Asian, and 2.7% from two or more races. Hispanic or Latino of any race were 2.7% of the population.

There were 229 households, of which 33.2% had children under the age of 18 living with them, 47.6% were married couples living together, 10.9% had a female householder with no husband present, 5.7% had a male householder with no wife present, and 35.8% were non-families. 31.9% of all households were made up of individuals, and 12.3% had someone living alone who was 65 years of age or older. The average household size was 2.41 and the average family size was 3.01.

The median age in the city was 39.2 years. 25.7% of residents were under the age of 18; 6.9% were between the ages of 18 and 24; 21.5% were from 25 to 44; 25.5% were from 45 to 64; and 20.3% were 65 years of age or older. The gender makeup of the city was 44.6% male and 55.4% female.

== Education ==
The community is served by Lebo–Waverly USD 243 public school district.

== Notable people ==
- Olive Ann Beech (born Olive Ann Mellor in Waverly), U.S. aviation pioneer and businesswoman
