= Burlington, Kansas =

City in Coffey County, Kansas, United States

- City and County seat
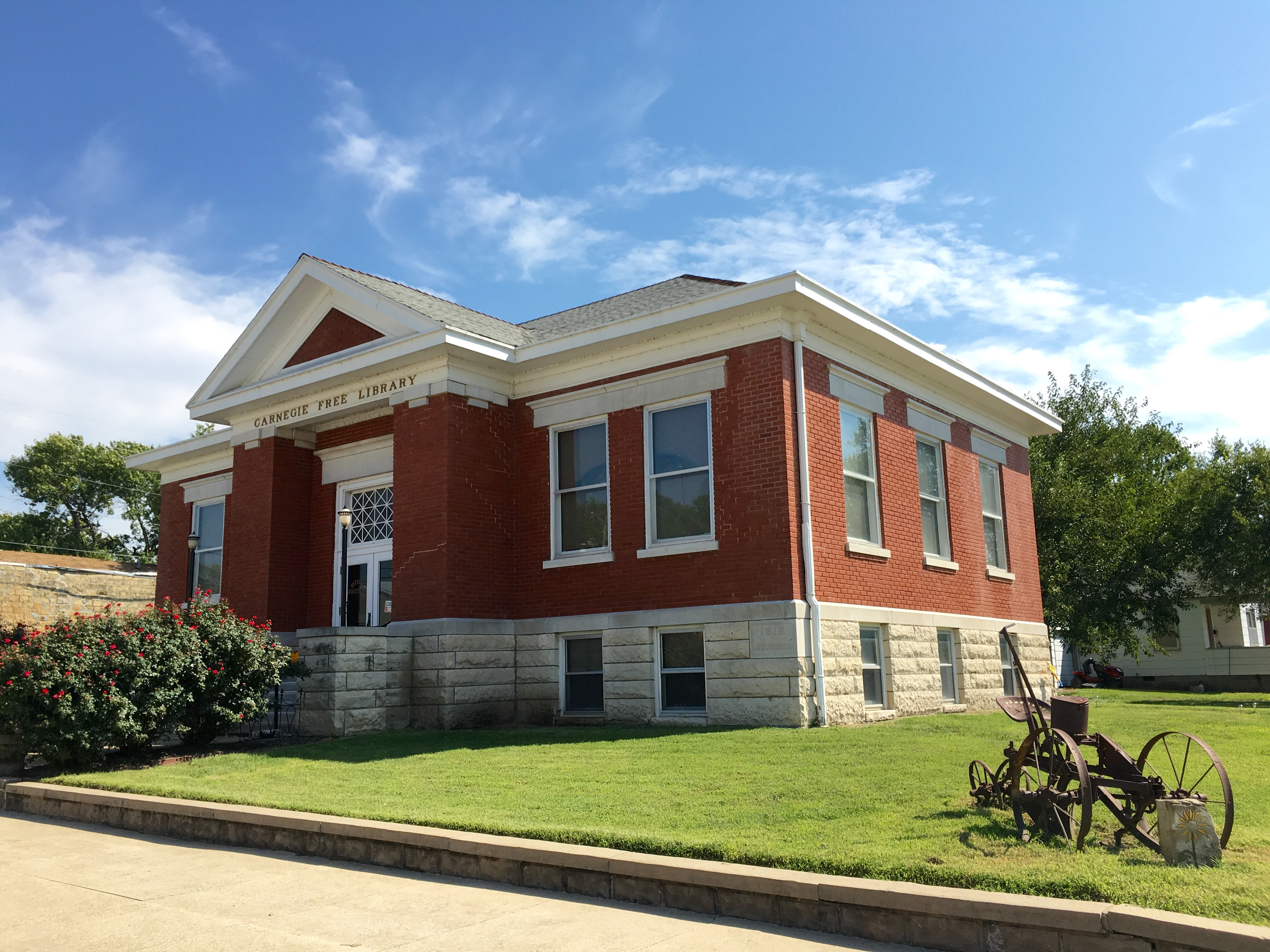
- Burlington Carnegie Library (2016)

- Location within Coffey County and Kansas

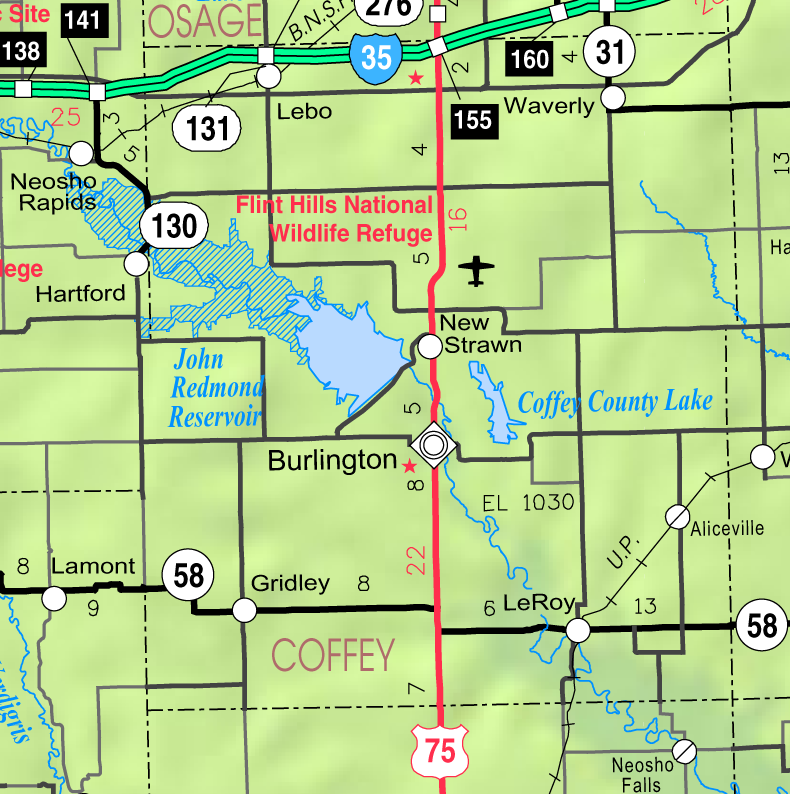
- KDOT map of Coffey County (legend)
- Coordinates: 38°11′37″N 95°44′43″W
- Country: United States
- State: Kansas
- County: Coffey
- Founded: 1857
- Incorporated: 1870
- Named for: Burlington, Vermont

Area
  - Total: 2.22 sq mi (5.76 km^{2})
  - Land: 2.21 sq mi (5.72 km^{2})
  - Water: 0.015 sq mi (0.04 km^{2})
- Elevation: 1,034 ft (315 m)

Population (2020)
  - Total: 2,634
  - Density: 1,190/sq mi (460/km^{2})
- Time zone: UTC-6 (CST)
  - Summer (DST): UTC-5 (CDT)
- ZIP Code: 66839
- Area code: 620
- FIPS code: 20-09400
- GNIS ID: 485549
- Website: burlingtonkansas.gov

Burlington is a city in and the county seat of Coffey County, Kansas, United States. As of the 2020 census, the population of the city was 2,634.

== History ==
Burlington was founded in 1857. It was named after Burlington, Vermont, the native home of one of its founders.

The first post office in Burlington was established in 1858, when it was removed from the now extinct town of Hampden.

The population increased significantly as Wolf Creek Generating Station was constructed from 1977 to 1985. During those years, Burlington was ‘the place to go’ drawing large crowds from nearby towns.

In May 1989, a $2.1 million recreation center was completed.

== Geography ==
According to the United States Census Bureau, the city has a total area of 2.21 square miles (5.72 km^{2}), of which 2.20 square miles (5.70 km^{2}) is land and 0.01 square miles (0.03 km^{2}) is water.

=== Climate ===
The climate in this area is characterized by hot, humid summers and generally mild to cool winters. According to the Köppen Climate Classification system, Burlington has a humid subtropical climate, abbreviated "Cfa" on climate maps.

Climate data for Burlington, Kansas, 1991–2020 normals, extremes 1894–present
Month	Jan	Feb	Mar	Apr	May	Jun	Jul	Aug	Sep	Oct	Nov	Dec	Year
Record high °F (°C)	79 (26)	86 (30)	94 (34)	95 (35)	102 (39)	110 (43)	117 (47)	117 (47)	110 (43)	97 (36)	85 (29)	76 (24)	117 (47)
Mean maximum °F (°C)	63.4 (17.4)	68.8 (20.4)	78.0 (25.6)	84.4 (29.1)	87.9 (31.1)	94.4 (34.7)	99.7 (37.6)	99.0 (37.2)	94.3 (34.6)	86.4 (30.2)	74.4 (23.6)	64.4 (18.0)	101.1 (38.4)
Mean daily maximum °F (°C)	41.2 (5.1)	46.3 (7.9)	57.1 (13.9)	67.4 (19.7)	75.9 (24.4)	85.3 (29.6)	90.2 (32.3)	89.5 (31.9)	81.5 (27.5)	69.7 (20.9)	56.1 (13.4)	44.7 (7.1)	67.1 (19.5)
Daily mean °F (°C)	30.2 (−1.0)	34.6 (1.4)	45.0 (7.2)	55.6 (13.1)	65.5 (18.6)	74.9 (23.8)	79.4 (26.3)	78.2 (25.7)	69.8 (21.0)	57.6 (14.2)	44.8 (7.1)	34.2 (1.2)	55.8 (13.2)
Mean daily minimum °F (°C)	19.2 (−7.1)	22.8 (−5.1)	32.8 (0.4)	43.8 (6.6)	55.1 (12.8)	64.4 (18.0)	68.7 (20.4)	66.9 (19.4)	58.1 (14.5)	45.6 (7.6)	33.5 (0.8)	23.7 (−4.6)	44.6 (7.0)
Mean minimum °F (°C)	−1.2 (−18.4)	6.6 (−14.1)	14.5 (−9.7)	27.4 (−2.6)	39.1 (3.9)	52.0 (11.1)	60.0 (15.6)	57.1 (13.9)	44.2 (6.8)	28.0 (−2.2)	15.8 (−9.0)	5.8 (−14.6)	−5.5 (−20.8)
Record low °F (°C)	−22 (−30)	−27 (−33)	−6 (−21)	13 (−11)	24 (−4)	39 (4)	41 (5)	43 (6)	29 (−2)	13 (−11)	−1 (−18)	−21 (−29)	−27 (−33)
Average precipitation inches (mm)	0.94 (24)	1.31 (33)	2.20 (56)	3.68 (93)	5.32 (135)	4.58 (116)	4.46 (113)	4.06 (103)	3.76 (96)	3.42 (87)	1.90 (48)	1.55 (39)	37.18 (943)
Average precipitation days (≥ 0.01 in)	3.1	4.1	5.7	7.5	8.6	7.6	7.3	6.9	6.5	6.2	4.5	3.7	71.7
Source: NOAA

== Demographics ==
Historical population
Census	Pop.	Note	%±
1860	118		—
1870	960		713.6%
1880	2,011		109.5%
1890	2,239		11.3%
1900	2,418		8.0%
1910	2,180		−9.8%
1920	2,236		2.6%
1930	2,273		1.7%
1940	2,379		4.7%
1950	2,304		−3.2%
1960	2,113		−8.3%
1970	2,099		−0.7%
1980	2,901		38.2%
1990	2,735		−5.7%
2000	2,790		2.0%
2010	2,674		−4.2%
2020	2,634		−1.5%
U.S. Decennial Census

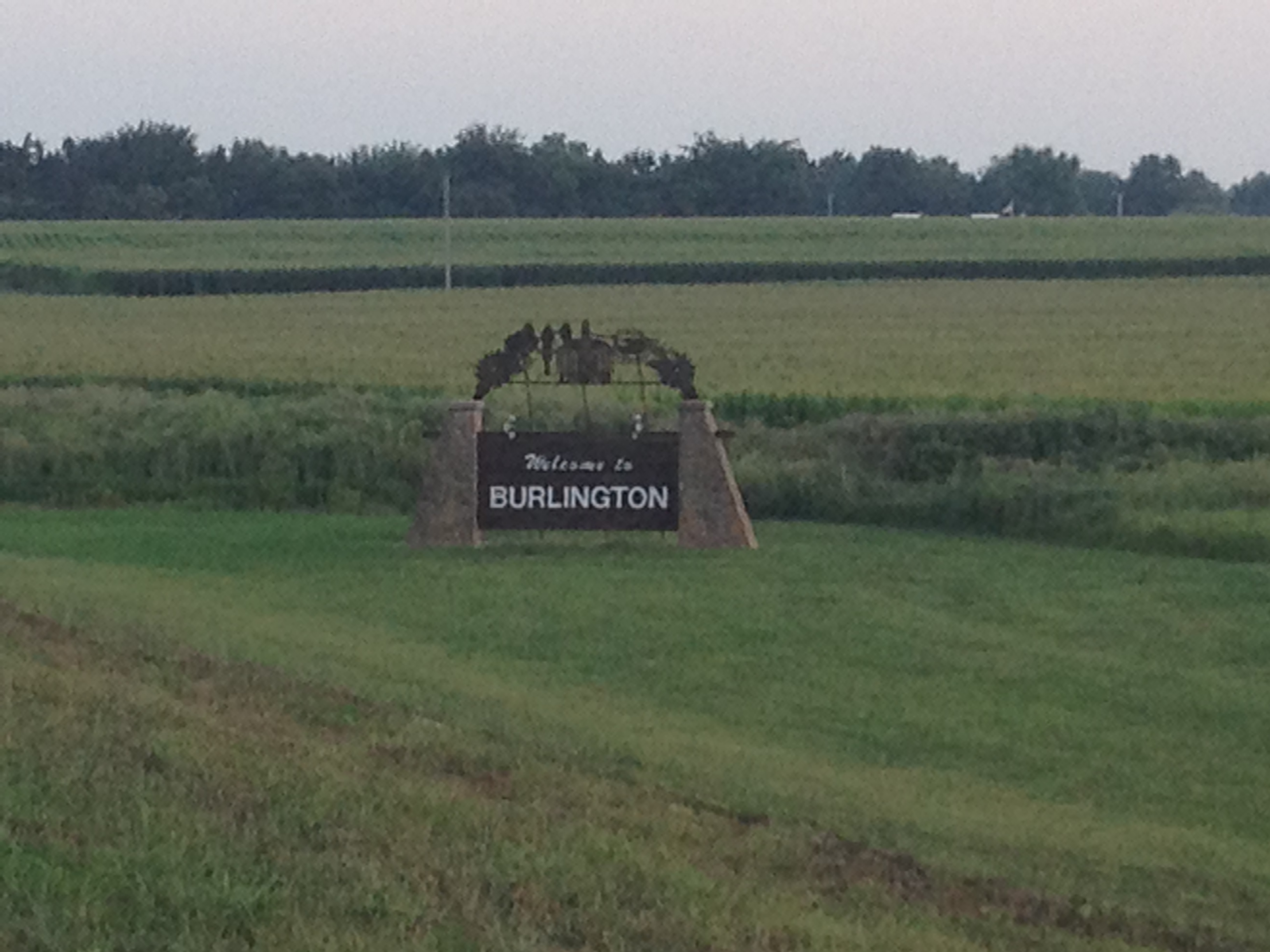
Welcome sign on north side of Burlington (2013)

=== 2020 census ===
As of the 2020 census, Burlington had a population of 2,634 people, including 1,136 households and 648 families. The median age was 42.7 years. For every 100 females, there were 92.0 males, and for every 100 females age 18 and over, there were 84.7 males age 18 and over.

The population density was 1,192.9 per square mile (460.6/km^{2}). There were 1,325 housing units at an average density of 600.1 per square mile (231.7/km^{2}). 0.0% of residents lived in urban areas, while 100.0% lived in rural areas.

Of households, 26.6% had children under the age of 18 living in them. Of all households, 42.3% were married-couple households, 18.1% were households with a male householder and no spouse or partner present, and 33.4% were households with a female householder and no spouse or partner present. About 38.6% of all households were made up of individuals and 19.0% had someone living alone who was 65 years of age or older. Of housing units, 14.3% were vacant. The homeowner vacancy rate was 4.1% and the rental vacancy rate was 13.1%.

23.8% of the population was under the age of 18, 5.8% from 18 to 24, 23.2% from 25 to 44, 25.2% from 45 to 64, and 22.0% who were 65 years of age or older.

Racial composition as of the 2020 census
Race	Number	Percent
White	2,388	90.7%
Black or African American	26	1.0%
American Indian and Alaska Native	12	0.5%
Asian	24	0.9%
Native Hawaiian and Other Pacific Islander	0	0.0%
Some other race	22	0.8%
Two or more races	162	6.2%
Hispanic or Latino (of any race)	88	3.3%

Demographic estimates

The average household size was 2.4 and the average family size was 2.9. The percent of those with a bachelor's degree or higher was estimated to be 14.4% of the population.

Income and poverty

The 2016–2020 5-year American Community Survey estimates show that the median household income was $46,800 (with a margin of error of +/- $8,382) and the median family income was $59,743 (+/- $7,916). Males had a median income of $36,923 (+/- $8,550) versus $23,750 (+/- $5,248) for females. The median income for those above 16 years old was $30,026 (+/- $3,565). Approximately, 13.3% of families and 16.8% of the population were below the poverty line, including 20.3% of those under the age of 18 and 8.2% of those ages 65 or over.

=== 2010 census ===
As of the census of 2010, there were 2,674 people, 1,138 households, and 699 families living in the city. The population density was 1,215.5 inhabitants per square mile (469.3/km^{2}). There were 1,296 housing units at an average density of 589.1 per square mile (227.5/km^{2}). The racial makeup of the city was 94.7% White, 1.0% African American, 1.0% Native American, 0.9% Asian, 0.7% from other races, and 1.7% from two or more races. Hispanic or Latino of any race were 2.5% of the population.

There were 1,138 households, of which 30.8% had children under the age of 18 living with them, 45.7% were married couples living together, 12.2% had a female householder with no husband present, 3.5% had a male householder with no wife present, and 38.6% were non-families. 33.7% of all households were made up of individuals, and 14.1% had someone living alone who was 65 years of age or older. The average household size was 2.27 and the average family size was 2.88.

The median age in the city was 41.1 years. 24.6% of residents were under the age of 18; 6.9% were between the ages of 18 and 24; 22.8% were from 25 to 44; 27.2% were from 45 to 64; and 18.3% were 65 years of age or older. The gender makeup of the city was 47.4% male and 52.6% female.

== Economy ==
=== Wolf Creek ===
Located just northeast of Burlington is the Wolf Creek Generating Station, the only nuclear power plant in Kansas. This plant is situated on Coffey County Lake, which was constructed as the cooling lake for the plant. The plant has been generating electricity since 1985, and is a local landmark. Wolf Creek Nuclear Operating Corporation ("WCNOC") operates the plant, and is a subsidiary of the plant's owners Kansas Gas & Electric (part of Westar Energy), Kansas City Power & Light (part of Great Plains Energy), and KEPCO (an association of Kansas electric power cooperatives). Westar and Great Plains Energy merged in 2018 to form Evergy, while maintaining the Westar and KCP&L names until October 2019.

== Education ==
The community is served by Burlington USD 244 public school district, and has three schools: Burlington High School, Burlington Middle School, Burlington Elementary School.

Allen County Community College offers classes at Burlington High School, both for adults and for high school students who may earn concurrent credits.

Burlington is home to the Burlington Carnegie Free Library, although the building no longer houses a library and is now used as an office space. The Burlington branch of the Coffey County Library meets the community's information needs.

== Notable people ==
- Christian Braun, former college basketball player for University of Kansas and NBA player for the Denver Nuggets
- Harrison Kelley (1836–1897), U.S. Representative from Kansas
- Tyrel Reed, former professional basketball player; former college basketball player for University of Kansas

== See also ==
- John Redmond Reservoir
- Great Flood of 1951
