= Lebo High School =

Lebo Junior-Senior High School

Location
- 12 West 4th Street; Lebo, Kansas 66856; 38°25′1.7364″N 95°51′30.5712″W

Information
- Funding type: Public
- Status: Open
- Sister school: Waverly Jr/Sr High School
- School board: BOE website
- School district: Lebo–Waverly USD 243
- NCES District ID: 2012810
- CEEB code: 171710
- NCES School ID: 201281000174
- Principal: Melissa Veatch
- Teaching staff: 11.72 (FTE)
- Grades: 6-12
- Gender: coed
- Enrollment: 117 (2024–25)
- Student to teacher ratio: 9.98
- Colors: Red; White
- Athletics: Football: 8-Player Division II, District 3 Basketball/Volleyball: Class 1A-II Baseball/Softball: Class 2-1A
- Athletics conference: Lyon County League
- Sports: Yes
- Mascot: Wolves
- Team name: Lebo Wolves
- Rival: Waverly High School
- Newspaper: The Wolf Tracks
- Affiliations: KSHSAA
- Website: Lebo Jr/Sr High School

Lebo Junior-Senior High School is a public high school located in Lebo, Kansas, in the Lebo–Waverly USD 243 school district, serving students in grades 6–12. Lebo has an enrollment of approximately 117 students. The principal is Dr. Melissa Veatch. The school mascot is the Wolves and the school colors are red and white.

== Extracurricular activities ==
The Wolves compete in the Lyon County League. The KSHSAA classification switches between 1A-I and 1A-II, the two lowest classes according to KSHSAA. The school also has a variety of organizations for the students to participate in.

=== Athletics ===
The Wolves compete in the Lyon County League and are classified as either 1A-I or 1A-II, two of the lowest classifications in Kansas according to KSHSAA. A majority of the sports are coached by the same coaches. Lebo Junior-Senior High School offers the following sports:

Fall Sports

- Cheerleading
- Cross Country
- Football
- Volleyball

Winter

- Boys' Basketball
- Girls' Basketball
- Cheerleading
- Wrestling

Spring

- Boys' Track and Field
- Girls' Track and Field
- Girls' Softball
- Boys' Baseball

=== Organizations ===
- Art
- Band
- Choir
- Family, Career and Community Leaders of America (FCCLA)
- Future Business Leaders of America (FBLA)
- Future Farmers of America (FFA)
- Journalism
- National Honor Society (NHS)
- Scholars Bowl
- Spanish
- Student Council (StuCo)

== See also ==
- Waverly High School
- Lebo-Waverly USD 243
- List of high schools in Kansas
- List of unified school districts in Kansas
