= Lebo (surname) =

Lebo is a surname. Notable people with the surname include:

- António Lebo Lebo (born 1977), Angolan footballer
- Brad Lebo (born 1970), American football player
- Jeff Lebo (born 1966), American basketball coach
- John Gaul Lebo (born 1972), Nigerian lawyer and politician
- Lauri Lebo (born 1964), American journalist
