= Burlington USD 244 =

Public school district in Burlington, Kansas

Address
- 301 Neosho Street Burlington, Kansas, 66839; United States
- Coordinates: 38°11′40″N 95°44′14″W

District information
- Type: Public
- Grades: K to 12
- Superintendent: Craig Marshall
- Accreditation: KSHSAA
- Schools: 3

Other information
- Website: usd244ks.org

Burlington USD 244 is a public unified school district headquartered in Burlington, Kansas, United States. The district includes the communities of Burlington, New Strawn, Ottumwa, Sharpe, and nearby rural areas.

== Schools ==
The school district operates the following schools:

- Burlington High School
- Burlington Middle School
- Burlington Elementary School

== See also ==
- Kansas State Department of Education
- Kansas State High School Activities Association
- List of high schools in Kansas
- List of unified school districts in Kansas
