= Flint Hills National Wildlife Refuge =

Protected land in Kansas, U.S.

- IUCN category IV (habitat/species management area)
- Location within the United States
- Location: Coffey County, Lyon County, Kansas, United States
- Nearest city: Hartford, Kansas
- Coordinates: 38°18′30″N 95°54′30″W
- Area: 18,463 acres (74.72 km^{2})
- Established: 1966
- Governing body: U.S. Fish and Wildlife Service
- Website: Flint Hills National Wildlife Refuge

Flint Hills National Wildlife Refuge (NWR) is a wildlife refuge located north and east of the city of Hartford, Kansas, United States, in northwestern Coffey and southeastern Lyon Counties. It was established in 1966 as part of the U.S. Army Corps of Engineers, John Redmond Reservoir flood control project. The U.S. Fish and Wildlife Service manages 18,463 acres (75 km^{2}) upstream of the reservoir, most of which is in the floodplain of the Neosho River. Refuge habitats, consisting of prairie grasslands, bottomland hardwood timber, shallow wetlands, and croplands, are managed to provide food and habitat for migratory birds and resident wildlife.

The Refuge is an important resting area for waterfowl migrating through Kansas. Thousands of mallards, blue-winged teal, Canada geese, and snow geese can be seen on the Refuge during their spring and fall migrations. The Refuge also provides valuable habitat for shorebirds, bald eagles, wild turkey, bobwhite quail, bobcats, white-tailed deer, and many species of warblers. The Refuge has been designated as an Important Bird Area and serves as a wintering area for bald eagles and dozens of red-tailed hawks, northern harriers, and rough-legged hawks.

== Recreational opportunities ==
- Boating
- Educational Programs
- Fishing
- Hiking
- Hunting
- Museum/Visitor Center
- Wildlife Viewing
