= Lebo–Waverly USD 243 =

Public school district in Waverly, Kansas

Address
- 411 N. Pearson Ave. Waverly, Kansas, 66871; United States
- Coordinates: 38°23′35.4186″N 95°36′0.8964″W

District information
- Type: Public
- Grades: PreK to 12
- Superintendent: Dustin Wilson
- Schools: 4
- NCES District ID: 2012810

Other information
- Board of Education: BOE Website
- Website: usd243ks.org

Lebo–Waverly USD 243 is a public unified school district headquartered in Waverly, Kansas, United States, serving the northern part of Coffey County. The district includes the communities of Lebo, Waverly, Agricola, Halls Summit, and nearby rural areas.

In addition to Coffey County, the district extends into the following counties: Franklin, Lyon, and Osage.

== Administration ==
Lebo–Waverly USD 243 is currently under the administration of superintendent Dustin Wilson.

== Board of education ==
The USD 243 Board of Education meetings are held on the second Monday of every month at the Central Office in Waverly, and begin at 7:00 p.m.

== Schools ==
The school district operates the following schools:

- Waverly High School in Waverly
- Lebo High School in Lebo
- Waverly Grade School in Waverly
- Lebo Grade School in Lebo

== See also ==
- Kansas State Department of Education
- Kansas State High School Activities Association
- List of high schools in Kansas
- List of unified school districts in Kansas
