= Gridley, Kansas =

City in Coffey County, Kansas

- City
- Location within Coffey County and Kansas

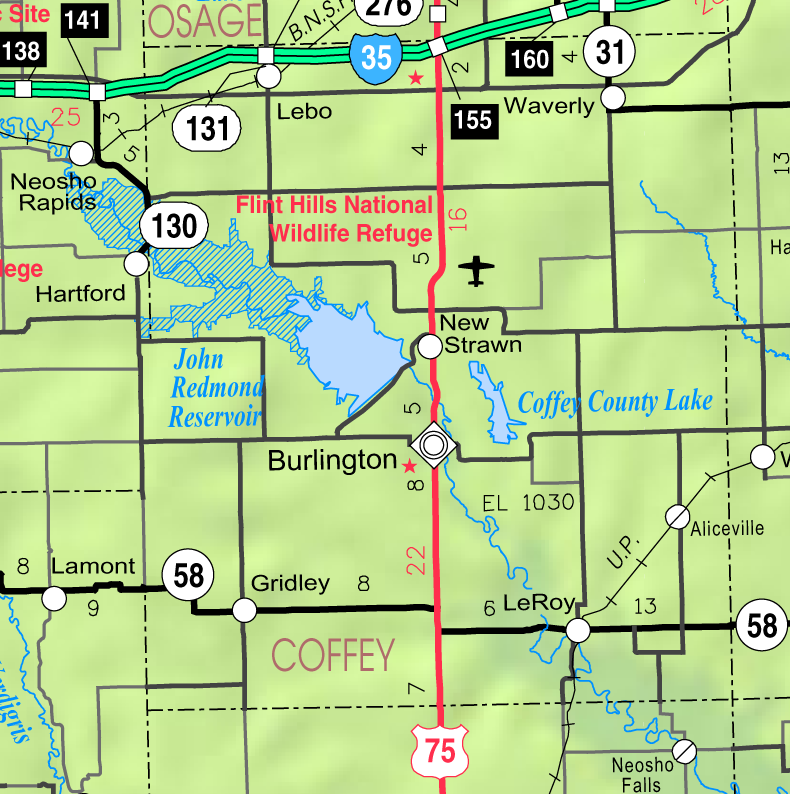
- KDOT map of Coffey County (legend)
- Coordinates: 38°06′03″N 95°52′57″W
- Country: United States
- State: Kansas
- County: Coffey

Area
  - Total: 0.49 sq mi (1.27 km^{2})
  - Land: 0.43 sq mi (1.11 km^{2})
  - Water: 0.062 sq mi (0.16 km^{2})
- Elevation: 1,155 ft (352 m)

Population (2020)
  - Total: 313
  - Density: 730/sq mi (282/km^{2})
- Time zone: UTC-6 (Central (CST))
  - Summer (DST): UTC-5 (CDT)
- ZIP Code: 66852
- Area code: 620
- FIPS code: 20-28850
- GNIS ID: 2394250
- Website: gridleyks.org

Gridley is a city in Coffey County, Kansas, United States. As of the 2020 census, the population of the city was 313.

Galloway ranch, Gridley, Kansas in a 1886 lithograph

== History ==
Gridley was founded in about 1886.

The first post office in Gridley was established on June 23, 1886.

== Geography ==
According to the United States Census Bureau, the city has a total area of 0.47 square miles (1.22 km^{2}), of which 0.41 square miles (1.06 km^{2}) is land and 0.06 square miles (0.16 km^{2}) is water.

=== Climate ===
The climate in this area is characterized by hot, humid summers and generally mild to cool winters. According to the Köppen Climate Classification system, Gridley has a humid subtropical climate, abbreviated "Cfa" on climate maps.

== Demographics ==
Historical population
Census	Pop.	Note	%±
1920	321		—
1930	434		35.2%
1940	418		−3.7%
1950	360		−13.9%
1960	321		−10.8%
1970	328		2.2%
1980	404		23.2%
1990	356		−11.9%
2000	372		4.5%
2010	341		−8.3%
2020	313		−8.2%
U.S. Decennial Census

=== 2020 census ===
The 2020 United States census counted 313 people, 136 households, and 82 families in Gridley. The population density was 731.3 per square mile (282.4/km^{2}). There were 160 housing units at an average density of 373.8 per square mile (144.3/km^{2}). The racial makeup was 94.89% (297) white or European American (90.1% non-Hispanic white), 0.32% (1) black or African-American, 0.64% (2) Native American or Alaska Native, 0.0% (0) Asian, 0.32% (1) Pacific Islander or Native Hawaiian, 0.0% (0) from other races, and 3.83% (12) from two or more races. Hispanic or Latino of any race was 5.43% (17) of the population.

Of the 136 households, 23.5% had children under the age of 18; 50.0% were married couples living together; 19.9% had a female householder with no spouse or partner present. 36.0% of households consisted of individuals and 16.9% had someone living alone who was 65 years of age or older. The average household size was 2.3 and the average family size was 3.0. The percent of those with a bachelor's degree or higher was estimated to be 10.5% of the population.

25.9% of the population was under the age of 18, 3.5% from 18 to 24, 22.0% from 25 to 44, 25.6% from 45 to 64, and 23.0% who were 65 years of age or older. The median age was 40.5 years. For every 100 females, there were 98.1 males. For every 100 females ages 18 and older, there were 95.0 males.

The 2016–2020 5-year American Community Survey estimates show that the median household income was $50,000 (with a margin of error of +/- $15,155) and the median family income was $53,750 (+/- $25,242). Males had a median income of $37,404 (+/- $3,842) versus $16,250 (+/- $12,864) for females. The median income for those above 16 years old was $30,625 (+/- $3,384). Approximately, 5.4% of families and 10.0% of the population were below the poverty line, including 7.8% of those under the age of 18 and 6.9% of those ages 65 or over.

=== 2010 census ===
As of the census of 2010, there were 341 people, 144 households, and 93 families residing in the city. The population density was 831.7 inhabitants per square mile (321.1/km^{2}). There were 174 housing units at an average density of 424.4 per square mile (163.9/km^{2}). The racial makeup of the city was 97.7% White, 0.9% African American, 0.3% Native American, 0.3% from other races, and 0.9% from two or more races. Hispanic or Latino of any race were 0.3% of the population.

There were 144 households, of which 31.3% had children under the age of 18 living with them, 52.8% were married couples living together, 7.6% had a female householder with no husband present, 4.2% had a male householder with no wife present, and 35.4% were non-families. 32.6% of all households were made up of individuals, and 17.4% had someone living alone who was 65 years of age or older. The average household size was 2.37 and the average family size was 2.98.

The median age in the city was 37.9 years. 26.7% of residents were under the age of 18; 9.3% were between the ages of 18 and 24; 20.9% were from 25 to 44; 24.7% were from 45 to 64; and 18.5% were 65 years of age or older. The gender makeup of the city was 49.3% male and 50.7% female.

== Education ==
Gridley is served by USD 245 LeRoy-Gridley, commonly referred to as USD 245 Southern Coffey County. School unification consolidated Gridley and LeRoy schools forming USD 245 in 2003. The Southern Coffey County High School mascot is Titans.

Gridley High School was closed through school unification. The Gridley High School mascot was Gridley Yellow Jackets.
