= LeRoy, Kansas =

City in Coffey County, Kansas

- City
- Location within Coffey County and Kansas

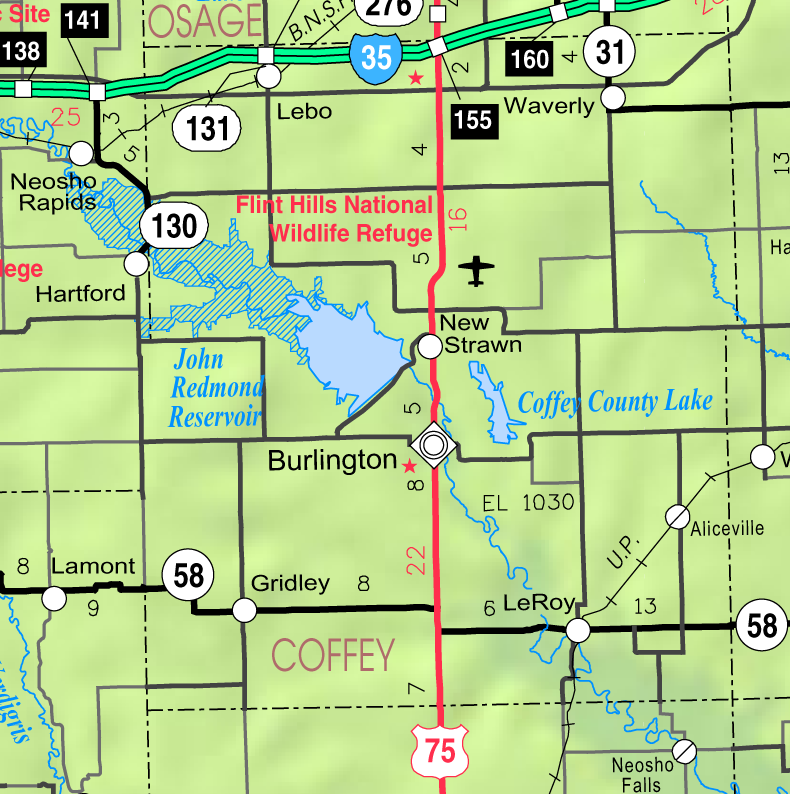
- KDOT map of Coffey County (legend)
- Coordinates: 38°05′11″N 95°37′59″W
- Country: United States
- State: Kansas
- County: Coffey
- Founded: 1855
- Incorporated: 1900
- Named for: Le Roy, Illinois

Area
  - Total: 0.83 sq mi (2.15 km^{2})
  - Land: 0.82 sq mi (2.13 km^{2})
  - Water: 0.0039 sq mi (0.01 km^{2})
- Elevation: 1,004 ft (306 m)

Population (2020)
  - Total: 451
  - Density: 548/sq mi (212/km^{2})
- Time zone: UTC-6 (Central (CST))
  - Summer (DST): UTC-5 (CDT)
- ZIP Code: 66857
- Area code: 620
- FIPS code: 20-39650
- GNIS ID: 2395685
- Website: leroykansas.com

LeRoy is a city in Coffey County, Kansas, United States. As of the 2020 census, the population of the city was 451.

== History ==
LeRoy was founded in 1855. It was named after the city of Le Roy, Illinois.

The first post office in LeRoy (a name also spelled historically as Leroy) was established in 1856.

During the Civil War the town had a military post from 1861 to 1864. LeRoy's post was one of a number of posts in eastern Kansas that existed to guard against Confederate guerrilla attacks and attacks by unfriendly Indians. On May 22, 1862, the 1st Regiment, Indian Home Guard was organized at Le Roy.

== Geography ==
According to the United States Census Bureau, the city has a total area of 0.83 square miles (2.15 km^{2}), of which 0.82 square miles (2.12 km^{2}) is land and 0.01 square miles (0.03 km^{2}) is water.

=== Climate ===
The climate in this area is characterized by hot, humid summers and generally mild to cool winters. According to the Köppen Climate Classification system, LeRoy has a humid subtropical climate, abbreviated "Cfa" on climate maps.

== Demographics ==
Historical population
Census	Pop.	Note	%±
1860	222		—
1870	410		84.7%
1880	545		32.9%
1890	893		63.9%
1900	772		−13.5%
1910	861		11.5%
1920	815		−5.3%
1930	788		−3.3%
1940	751		−4.7%
1950	695		−7.5%
1960	601		−13.5%
1970	551		−8.3%
1980	701		27.2%
1990	568		−19.0%
2000	593		4.4%
2010	561		−5.4%
2020	451		−19.6%
U.S. Decennial Census

=== 2020 census ===
The 2020 United States census counted 451 people, 211 households, and 123 families in LeRoy. The population density was 547.3 per square mile (211.3/km^{2}). There were 255 housing units at an average density of 309.5 per square mile (119.5/km^{2}). The racial makeup was 91.35% (412) white or European American (90.69% non-Hispanic white), 0.67% (3) black or African-American, 0.22% (1) Native American or Alaska Native, 0.44% (2) Asian, 0.0% (0) Pacific Islander or Native Hawaiian, 0.89% (4) from other races, and 6.43% (29) from two or more races. Hispanic or Latino of any race was 1.11% (5) of the population.

Of the 211 households, 20.9% had children under the age of 18; 43.1% were married couples living together; 26.1% had a female householder with no spouse or partner present. 35.1% of households consisted of individuals and 17.5% had someone living alone who was 65 years of age or older. The average household size was 2.1 and the average family size was 2.5. The percent of those with a bachelor's degree or higher was estimated to be 10.2% of the population.

19.7% of the population was under the age of 18, 8.4% from 18 to 24, 19.5% from 25 to 44, 30.6% from 45 to 64, and 21.7% who were 65 years of age or older. The median age was 47.2 years. For every 100 females, there were 109.8 males. For every 100 females ages 18 and older, there were 110.5 males.

The 2016–2020 5-year American Community Survey estimates show that the median household income was $42,600 (with a margin of error of +/- $3,693) and the median family income was $45,625 (+/- $11,520). Males had a median income of $36,750 (+/- $7,876) versus $21,513 (+/- $4,196) for females. The median income for those above 16 years old was $32,237 (+/- $7,095). Approximately, 18.9% of families and 21.1% of the population were below the poverty line, including 30.6% of those under the age of 18 and 2.1% of those ages 65 or over.

=== 2010 census ===
As of the census of 2010, there were 561 people, 230 households, and 156 families residing in the city. The population density was 684.1 inhabitants per square mile (264.1/km^{2}). There were 269 housing units at an average density of 328.0 per square mile (126.6/km^{2}). The racial makeup of the city was 97.9% White, 0.2% Native American, 0.2% Asian, and 1.8% from two or more races. Hispanic or Latino of any race were 1.6% of the population.

There were 230 households, of which 33.0% had children under the age of 18 living with them, 53.5% were married couples living together, 10.9% had a female householder with no husband present, 3.5% had a male householder with no wife present, and 32.2% were non-families. 29.1% of all households were made up of individuals, and 10.4% had someone living alone who was 65 years of age or older. The average household size was 2.44 and the average family size was 2.99.

The median age in the city was 40.9 years. 26.2% of residents were under the age of 18; 6.1% were between the ages of 18 and 24; 22% were from 25 to 44; 29.8% were from 45 to 64; and 15.9% were 65 years of age or older. The gender makeup of the city was 50.4% male and 49.6% female.

== Education ==
LeRoy is served by LeRoy–Gridley USD 245, commonly known as Southern Coffey County USD 245. School unification consolidated LeRoy and Gridley schools forming Southern Coffey County High School in 2003. The Southern Coffey County High School mascot is Titans.

LeRoy High School was closed through school unification. The LeRoy High School mascot was LeRoy Bluejays.

== Notable person ==
- Bill Otto, Kansas State Representative

== See also ==
- Great Flood of 1951
