= Burlington Carnegie Free Library (Burlington, Kansas) =

- U.S. National Register of Historic Places
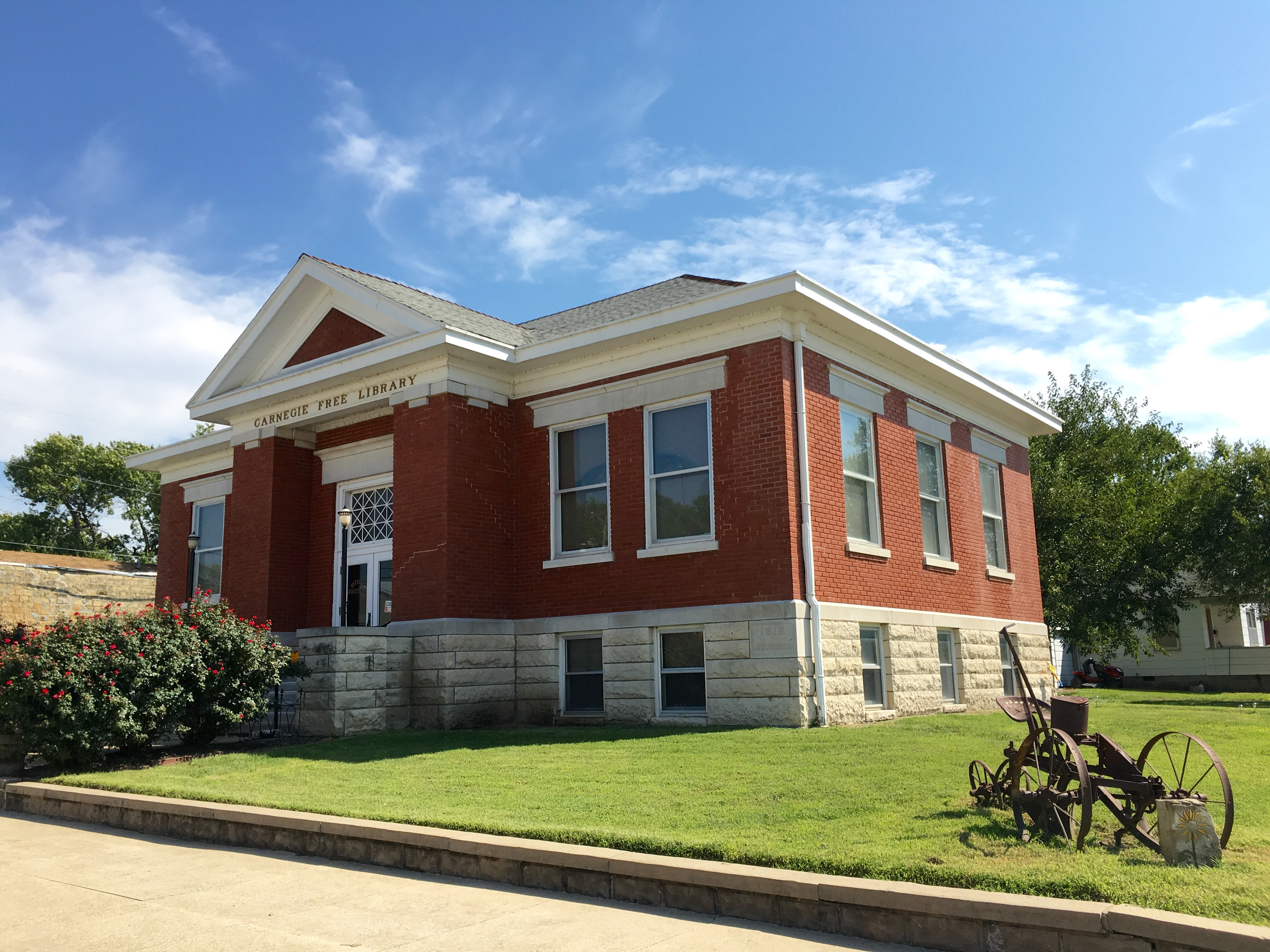

- Location within Kansas Location within the United States
- Location: 201 N. Third, Burlington, Kansas
- Coordinates: 38°11′46″N 95°44′1″W
- Area: less than one acre
- Built: 1912
- Built by: Neblong, Louis
- Architect: Washburn, George P., & Son
- Architectural style: Classical Revival
- MPS: Carnegie Libraries of Kansas TR
- NRHP reference No.: 87000934
- Added to NRHP: June 25, 1987

The Burlington Carnegie Free Library is a Carnegie library located at 201 N. Third in Burlington, Kansas, United States. The library was built in 1912 through a $9,656 grant from the Carnegie Foundation; it housed the city's library program, which was established in 1884. Architect George P. Washburn designed the library in a Classical Revival style with three bays, a design he used in several other libraries. The one-story brick library sits atop a limestone foundation. The front entrance is topped by a pediment; the main door has a large decorative glass transon and is topped by a limestone lintel. The library was added to the National Register of Historic Places on June 25, 1987. The building is no longer a working library, as it was vacated after the opening of the Burlington branch of the Coffey County Library in 1994. It was later restored, and now serves as the home of Merry Investments LLC.
