= Pottawatomie Township, Coffey County, Kansas =

Pottawatomie Township
- Township
- Location in Coffey County
- Coordinates: 38°18′10″N 095°35′26″W
- Country: United States
- State: Kansas
- County: Coffey

Area
  - Total: 54.44 sq mi (140.99 km^{2})
  - Land: 53.97 sq mi (139.77 km^{2})
  - Water: 0.47 sq mi (1.22 km^{2}) 0.87%
- Elevation: 1,171 ft (357 m)

Population (2020)
  - Total: 179
  - Density: 3.32/sq mi (1.28/km^{2})
- GNIS feature ID: 0477475

Pottawatomie Township is a township in Coffey County, Kansas, United States. As of the 2020 census, its population was 179.

== Geography ==
Pottawatomie Township covers an area of 54.44 square miles (141.0 km^{2}) and contains no incorporated settlements. According to the USGS, it contains three cemeteries: Glendale, Halls Summit and Prairie View.

The stream of School Creek runs through this township.
