= New Strawn, Kansas =

City in Coffey County, Kansas, United States

- City
- Location within Coffey County and Kansas

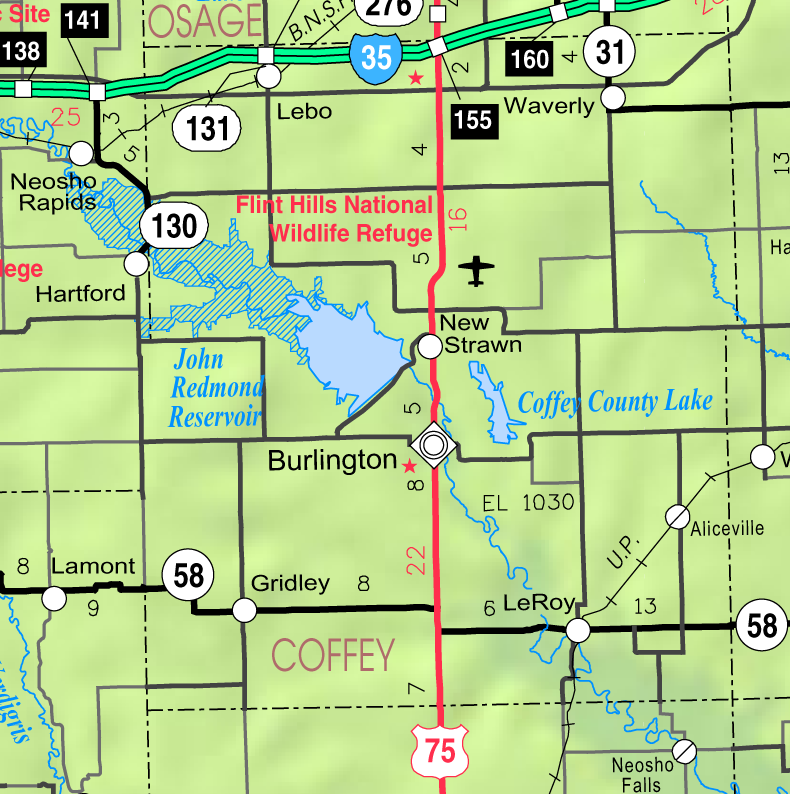
- KDOT map of Coffey County (legend)
- Coordinates: 38°15′44″N 95°44′32″W
- Country: United States
- State: Kansas
- County: Coffey
- Incorporated: 1970

Area
  - Total: 0.83 sq mi (2.15 km^{2})
  - Land: 0.79 sq mi (2.05 km^{2})
  - Water: 0.039 sq mi (0.10 km^{2})
- Elevation: 1,106 ft (337 m)

Population (2020)
  - Total: 414
  - Density: 523/sq mi (202/km^{2})
- Time zone: UTC-6 (CST)
  - Summer (DST): UTC-5 (CDT)
- ZIP Code: 66839
- Area code: 620
- FIPS code: 20-50450
- GNIS ID: 2395215
- Website: newstrawn.org

New Strawn is a city in Coffey County, Kansas, United States. As of the 2020 census, the population of the city was 414.

== History ==
The city of New Strawn came about when John Redmond Reservoir was built in the early 1960s, causing the original town of Strawn to be claimed by the Army Corps of Engineers for flood area. The old city of Strawn is usually available for exploration, but will be underwater if the lake is up. Very little is left of "old" Strawn today, although Main Street can still be traveled when dry.

The school at the old site of Strawn was a two-room school with first through fourth grades in one room and fifth through eighth grades in the second room. The Strawn Methodist Church was just to the south. A small parking area is at the approximate site of the school and church. In 1974, a roller skating rink, named Stardust, was built. In the late 1980's, the rink was converted into a bowling alley and later closed in the early 1990's. The building sat unused for a few years and was eventually used as an outlet store, followed by a towing and recovery service. The building still stands today at 110 W Decker St.

The Wildcat Grill, located at 255 Main St, was previously named Robert Lee's Bar & Grill, followed by Buddies Bar & Grill, The Beer Den, Brew & Stew, and The Chapter 11 Bar. Caseys General store has been in business since 1985.

The 9-hole Indian Plains Golf Course was opened in 1973.

== Geography ==
According to the United States Census Bureau, the city has a total area of 0.82 square miles (2.12 km^{2}), of which 0.78 square miles (2.02 km^{2}) is land and 0.04 square miles (0.10 km^{2}) is water.

=== Climate ===
The climate in this area is characterized by hot, humid summers and generally mild to cool winters. According to the Köppen climate classification] system, New Strawn has a humid subtropical climate, abbreviated "Cfa" on climate maps.

== Demographics ==
Historical population
| Census | Pop. | Note | %± |
|---|---|---|---|
| 1980 | 457 | | — |
| 1990 | 428 | | −6.3% |
| 2000 | 425 | | −0.7% |
| 2010 | 394 | | −7.3% |
| 2020 | 414 | | 5.1% |
U.S. Decennial Census

=== 2020 census ===
The 2020 United States census counted 414 people, 161 households, and 116 families in New Strawn. The population density was 522.1 per square mile (201.6/km^{2}). There were 181 housing units at an average density of 228.2 per square mile (88.1/km^{2}). The racial makeup was 94.44% (391) white or European American (93.48% non-Hispanic white), 0.0% (0) black or African-American, 0.0% (0) Native American or Alaska Native, 0.48% (2) Asian, 0.0% (0) Pacific Islander or Native Hawaiian, 1.93% (8) from other races, and 3.14% (13) from two or more races. Hispanic or Latino of any race was 3.62% (15) of the population.

Of the 161 households, 30.4% had children under the age of 18; 62.1% were married couples living together; 17.4% had a female householder with no spouse or partner present. 25.5% of households consisted of individuals, and 8.7% had someone living alone who was 65 years of age or older. The average household size was 2.5 and the average family size was 3.0. The percent of those with a bachelor's degree or higher was estimated to be 29.0% of the population.

23.2% of the population was under the age of 18, 5.3% from 18 to 24, 23.4% from 25 to 44, 27.5% from 45 to 64, and 20.5% who were 65 years of age or older. The median age was 42.7 years. For every 100 females, there were 108.0 males. For every 100 females ages 18 and older, there were 113.4 males.

The 2016–2020 5-year American Community Survey estimates show that the median household income was $90,547 (with a margin of error of ± $9,927) and the median family income was $85,625 (± $22,316). Males had a median income of $64,464 (± $18,133) versus $23,333 (± $5,853) for females. The median income for those above 16 years old was $37,266 (± $14,925). Approximately, 6.8% of families and 5.9% of the population were below the poverty line, including 9.3% of those under the age of 18 and 0.0% of those ages 65 or over.

=== 2010 census ===
As of the census of 2010, there were 394 people, 163 households, and 126 families residing in the city. The population density was 505.1 inhabitants per square mile (195.0/km^{2}). There were 173 housing units at an average density of 221.8 per square mile (85.6/km^{2}). The racial makeup of the city was 95.9% White, 0.5% African American, 1.5% Native American, and 2.0% from two or more races. Hispanic or Latino of any race were 1.8% of the population.

There were 163 households, of which 30.1% had children under the age of 18 living with them, 63.2% were married couples living together, 9.2% had a female householder with no husband present, 4.9% had a male householder with no wife present, and 22.7% were non-families. 19.6% of all households were made up of individuals, and 3.1% had someone living alone who was 65 years of age or older. The average household size was 2.42 and the average family size was 2.72.

The median age in the city was 42 years. 22.1% of residents were under the age of 18; 3.8% were between the ages of 18 and 24; 28% were from 25 to 44; 36.8% were from 45 to 64; and 9.4% were 65 years of age or older. The gender makeup of the city was 49.7% male and 50.3% female.

== Education ==
The community is served by the Burlington USD 244 public school district.
