= Elmendaro Township, Kansas =

Township in Lyon County, Kansas, U.S.

Elmendaro Township
- Township
- Location in Lyon County
- Coordinates: 38.252943°N 96.036019°W
- Country: United States
- State: Kansas
- County: Lyon

Area
  - Total: 99.476 sq mi (257.64 km^{2})
  - Land: 98.931 sq mi (256.23 km^{2})
  - Water: 0.545 sq mi (1.41 km^{2}) 0.55%

Population (2020)
  - Total: 741
  - Density: 7.49/sq mi (2.89/km^{2})
- Time zone: UTC-6 (CST)
  - Summer (DST): UTC-5 (CDT)
- Area code: 620

Elmendaro Township is a township in Lyon County, Kansas, United States. As of the 2020 census, its population was 741.

== Geography ==
Elmendaro Township covers an area of 99.476 square miles (257.64 square kilometers).

=== Communities ===
- Hartford

=== Adjacent townships ===
- Jackson Township, Lyon County (north)
- Lincoln Township, Coffey County (northeast)
- Pleasant Township, Coffey County (east)
- Liberty Township, Coffey County (southeast)
- Shell Rock Township, Greenwood County (south)
- Madison Township, Greenwood County (southwest)
- Center Township, Lyon County (west)
- Emporia Township, Lyon County (northwest)
