= Miller, Kansas =

Unincorporated community in Lyon County, Kansas

- Unincorporated community
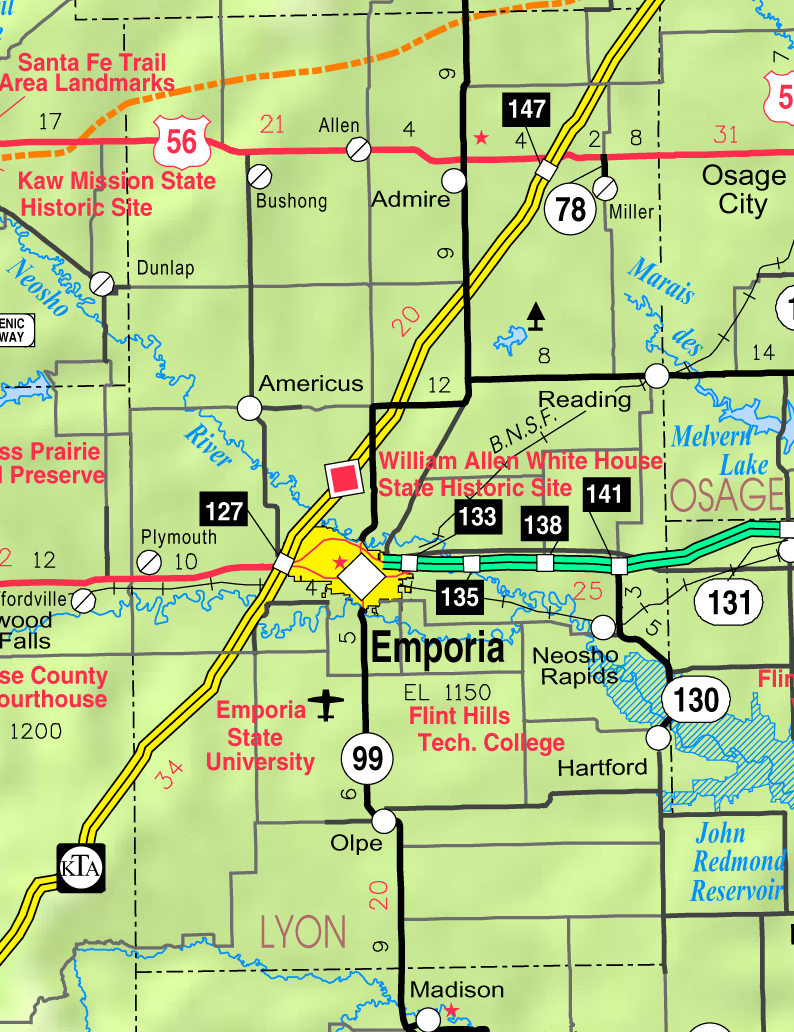
- KDOT map of Lyon County (legend)

- Location within Kansas Location within the United States
- Coordinates: 38°38′04″N 95°59′26″W
- Country: United States
- State: Kansas
- County: Lyon
- Founded: 1910
- Elevation: 1,122 ft (342 m)
- Time zone: UTC-6 (CST)
  - Summer (DST): UTC-5 (CDT)
- ZIP Code: 66868
- Area code: 785
- FIPS code: 20-46775
- GNIS ID: 479282

Miller is an unincorporated community in Lyon County, Kansas, United States. It is located approximately 5.5 miles east of the city of Admire along Rd W7.

== History ==
Miller was founded in 1910.

The post office in Miller was discontinued in 1958.

== Geography ==
The climate in this area is characterized by hot, humid summers and generally mild to cool winters. According to the Köppen Climate Classification system, Miller has a humid subtropical climate, abbreviated "Cfa" on climate maps.

== Government ==
The nearest post office to Miller is in Osage City, because the post office in Reading was closed after their 2011 tornado. The mail is carried out of Lebo.

== Education ==
The community is served by North Lyon County USD 251 public school district, and its headquarters are located in Americus. The Northern Heights High School is located east of Allen, and its mascot is the Wildcats. The NLC Elementary School and NLC Early Learning Center (preschool) are located in Americus.
