= Jackson Township, Lyon County, Kansas =

Township in Lyon County, Kansas, U.S.

Jackson Township
- Township
- Location in Lyon County
- Coordinates: 38.3978°N 96.0217°W
- Country: United States
- State: Kansas
- County: Lyon

Area
  - Total: 88.16 sq mi (228.3 km^{2})
  - Land: 86.983 sq mi (225.28 km^{2})
  - Water: 1.177 sq mi (3.05 km^{2}) 1.34%

Population (2020)
  - Total: 993
  - Density: 11.4/sq mi (4.41/km^{2})
- Time zone: UTC-6 (CST)
  - Summer (DST): UTC-5 (CDT)
- Area code: 620

Jackson Township is a township in Lyon County, Kansas, United States.

== History ==
Jackson Township was originally called Forest Hill Township, and under the latter name was formed in 1859. It was renamed Jackson Township in 1860.

== Geography ==
Jackson Township covers an area of 88.16 square miles (228.3 square kilometers).

=== Communities ===
- Neosho Rapids

=== Adjacent townships ===
- Reading Township, Lyon County (north)
- Arvonia Township, Osage County (northeast)
- Lincoln Township, Coffey County (east)
- Elmendaro Township, Lyon County (south)
- Emporia Township, Lyon County (west)
- Fremont Township, Lyon County (northwest)

=== Major highways ===
- I-35
- K-130
