= Americus Township, Kansas =

Township in Lyon County, Kansas, U.S.

Americus Township
- Township
- Location in Lyon County
- Coordinates: 38.5281°N 96.2842°W
- Country: United States
- State: Kansas
- County: Lyon

Area
  - Total: 87.399 sq mi (226.36 km^{2})
  - Land: 86.663 sq mi (224.46 km^{2})
  - Water: 0.736 sq mi (1.91 km^{2}) 0.84%

Population (2020)
  - Total: 1,373
  - Density: 15.84/sq mi (6.117/km^{2})
- Time zone: UTC-6 (CST)
  - Summer (DST): UTC-5 (CDT)
- Area code: 620

Americus Township is a township in Lyon County, Kansas, United States.

== History ==
Americus Township was founded in 1857.

== Geography ==
Americus Township covers an area of 87.399 square miles (226.36 square kilometers).

=== Communities ===
- Americus

=== Adjacent townships ===
- Agnes City Township, Lyon County (north)
- Fremont Township, Lyon County (east)
- Emporia Township, Lyon County (southeast)
- Pike Township, Lyon County (south)
- Toledo Township, Chase County (southwest)
- Township 1, Morris County (northwest)
