= Agnes City Township, Kansas =

Township in Lyon County, Kansas, U.S.

Agnes City Township, Lyon County, Kansas
- Township
- Interactive map of Agnes City Township, Lyon County, Kansas
- Coordinates: 38°39′54″N 96°13′50″W
- Country: United States
- State: Kansas
- County: Lyon

Area
  - Total: 107.8 sq mi (279.2 km^{2})
  - Land: 107.6 sq mi (278.8 km^{2})
  - Water: 0.15 sq mi (0.4 km^{2})
- Elevation: 1,447 ft (441 m)

Population (2020)
  - Total: 400
  - Density: 3.7/sq mi (1.4/km^{2})
- Time zone: UTC-6 (Central (CST))
  - Summer (DST): UTC-5 (CDT)
- Area code: 620
- FIPS code: 20-00525
- GNIS feature ID: 0477033

Agnes City Township is a township in Lyon County, Kansas, United States.

== History ==
Agnes City Township was founded in 1857.

== Geography ==
=== Communities ===
- Allen
- Bushong

=== Adjacent townships ===
- Rock Creek Township, Wabaunsee County (north)
- Wilmington Township, Wabaunsee County (northeast)
- Waterloo Township, Lyon County (east-northeast)
- Ivy Township, Lyon County (east)
- Fremont Township, Lyon County (southeast)
- Americus Township, Lyon County (south)
- Township 1, Morris County (southwest)
- Township 2, Morris County (northwest)

=== Major highways ===
- US-56
