= Center Township, Lyon County, Kansas =

Township in Lyon County, Kansas, U.S.

Center Township
- Township
- Location in Lyon County
- Coordinates: 38.252648°N 96.238271°W
- Country: United States
- State: Kansas
- County: Lyon

Area
  - Total: 119.787 sq mi (310.25 km^{2})
  - Land: 118.725 sq mi (307.50 km^{2})
  - Water: 1.062 sq mi (2.75 km^{2}) 0.89%

Population (2020)
  - Total: 1,094
  - Density: 9.215/sq mi (3.558/km^{2})
- Time zone: UTC-6 (CST)
  - Summer (DST): UTC-5 (CDT)
- Area code: 620

Center Township is a township in Lyon County, Kansas, United States. As of the 2020 census, its population was 1,094.

== Geography ==
Center Township covers an area of 119.787 square miles (310.25 square kilometers).

=== Communities ===
- Olpe

=== Adjacent townships ===
- Pike Township, Lyon County (north)
- Emporia Township, Lyon County (northeast)
- Elmendaro Township, Lyon County (east)
- Madison Township, Greenwood County (south)
- Matfield Township, Chase County (southwest)
- Bazaar Township, Chase County (west)
- Toledo Township, Chase County (northwest)

=== Major highways ===
- I-35
- K-99
