= Arvonia Township, Kansas =

Township in Osage County, Kansas, U.S.

Arvonia Township
- Township
- Location within Osage County
- Coordinates: 38.470288°N 95.870347°W
- Country: United States
- State: Kansas
- County: Osage
- Established: 1869

Area
  - Total: 48.133 sq mi (124.66 km^{2})
  - Land: 43.308 sq mi (112.17 km^{2})
  - Water: 4.825 sq mi (12.50 km^{2}) 10.02%
- Elevation: 1,076 ft (328 m)

Population (2020)
  - Total: 122
  - Density: 2.82/sq mi (1.09/km^{2})
- Time zone: UTC-6 (CST)
  - Summer (DST): UTC-5 (CDT)
- Area code: 785
- GNIS feature ID: 479593

Arvonia Township is a township in Osage County, Kansas, United States. As of the 2020 census, its population was 122.

== History ==
Arvonia Township was established in 1869 by Welsh settlers.

== Geography ==
The Marais des Cygnes River flows through it, and flows into Melvern Lake.

=== Adjacent townships ===
- Barclay Township, Osage County (north)
- Olivet Township, Osage County (east)
- Key West Township, Coffey County (southeast)
- Lincoln Township, Coffey County (south)
- Jackson Township, Lyon County (southwest)
- Reading Township, Lyon County (northwest)

== Transportation ==
=== Major highways ===
- K-170
