= Ivy Township, Kansas =

Township in Lyon County, Kansas, US

Ivy Township
- Township
- Location in Lyon County
- Coordinates: 38.6419°N 96.0794°W
- Country: United States
- State: Kansas
- County: Lyon

Area
  - Total: 33.985 sq mi (88.02 km^{2})
  - Land: 33.772 sq mi (87.47 km^{2})
  - Water: 0.213 sq mi (0.55 km^{2}) 0.63%

Population (2020)
  - Total: 270
  - Density: 8.0/sq mi (3.1/km^{2})
- Time zone: UTC-6 (CST)
  - Summer (DST): UTC-5 (CDT)
- Area code: 620

Ivy Township is a township in Lyon County, Kansas, United States.

== History ==
Ivy Township was founded in 1886.

== Geography ==
Ivy Township covers an area of 33.985 square miles (88.02 square kilometers).

=== Communities ===
- Admire

=== Adjacent townships ===
- Waterloo Township, Lyon County (northeast)
- Reading Township, Lyon County (south)
- Fremont Township, Lyon County (southwest)
- Agnes City Township, Lyon County (west)

=== Major highways ===
- I-335
- US-56
- K-99
