= Reading Township, Kansas =

Township in Lyon County, Kansas, U.S.

Reading Township
- Township
- Location in Lyon County
- Coordinates: 38.537431°N 96.016288°W
- Country: United States
- State: Kansas
- County: Lyon

Area
  - Total: 68.12 sq mi (176.4 km^{2})
  - Land: 67.316 sq mi (174.35 km^{2})
  - Water: 0.804 sq mi (2.08 km^{2}) 1.18%

Population (2020)
  - Total: 443
  - Density: 6.58/sq mi (2.54/km^{2})
- Time zone: UTC-6 (CST)
  - Summer (DST): UTC-5 (CDT)
- Area code: 620

Reading Township is a township in Lyon County, Kansas, United States. As of the 2020 census, its population was 443.

== Geography ==
Reading Township covers an area of 68.12 square miles (176.4 square kilometers).

=== Communities ===
- Reading

=== Adjacent townships ===
- Waterloo Township, Lyon County (north)
- Grant Township, Osage County (northeast)
- Barclay Township, Osage County (east)
- Arvonia Township, Osage County (southeast)
- Jackson Township, Lyon County (south)
- Fremont Township, Lyon County (west)
- Ivy Township, Lyon County (northwest)

=== Major highways ===
- I-335
- K-99
- K-170
