= Pike Township, Kansas =

Township in Lyon County, Kansas, U.S.

Pike Township
- Township
- Location in Lyon County
- Coordinates: 38.3856°N 96.2983°W
- Country: United States
- State: Kansas
- County: Lyon

Area
  - Total: 53.884 sq mi (139.56 km^{2})
  - Land: 53.37 sq mi (138.2 km^{2})
  - Water: 0.514 sq mi (1.33 km^{2}) 0.95%

Population (2020)
  - Total: 784
  - Density: 14.7/sq mi (5.67/km^{2})
- Time zone: UTC-6 (CST)
  - Summer (DST): UTC-5 (CDT)
- Area code: 620

Pike Township is a township in Lyon County, Kansas, United States.

== History ==
Pike Township was originally called Cottonwood Township, and the latter name was established in 1857. It was renamed Pike Township in 1860.

== Geography ==
Pike Township covers an area of 53.884 square miles (139.56 square kilometers).

=== Communities ===
- Plymouth

=== Adjacent townships ===
- Americus Township, Lyon County (north)
- Emporia Township, Lyon County (east)
- Center Township, Lyon County (south)
- Toledo Township, Chase County (west)

=== Major highways ===
- I-35
- US-50
