= Bushong, Kansas =

City in Lyon County, Kansas

- City
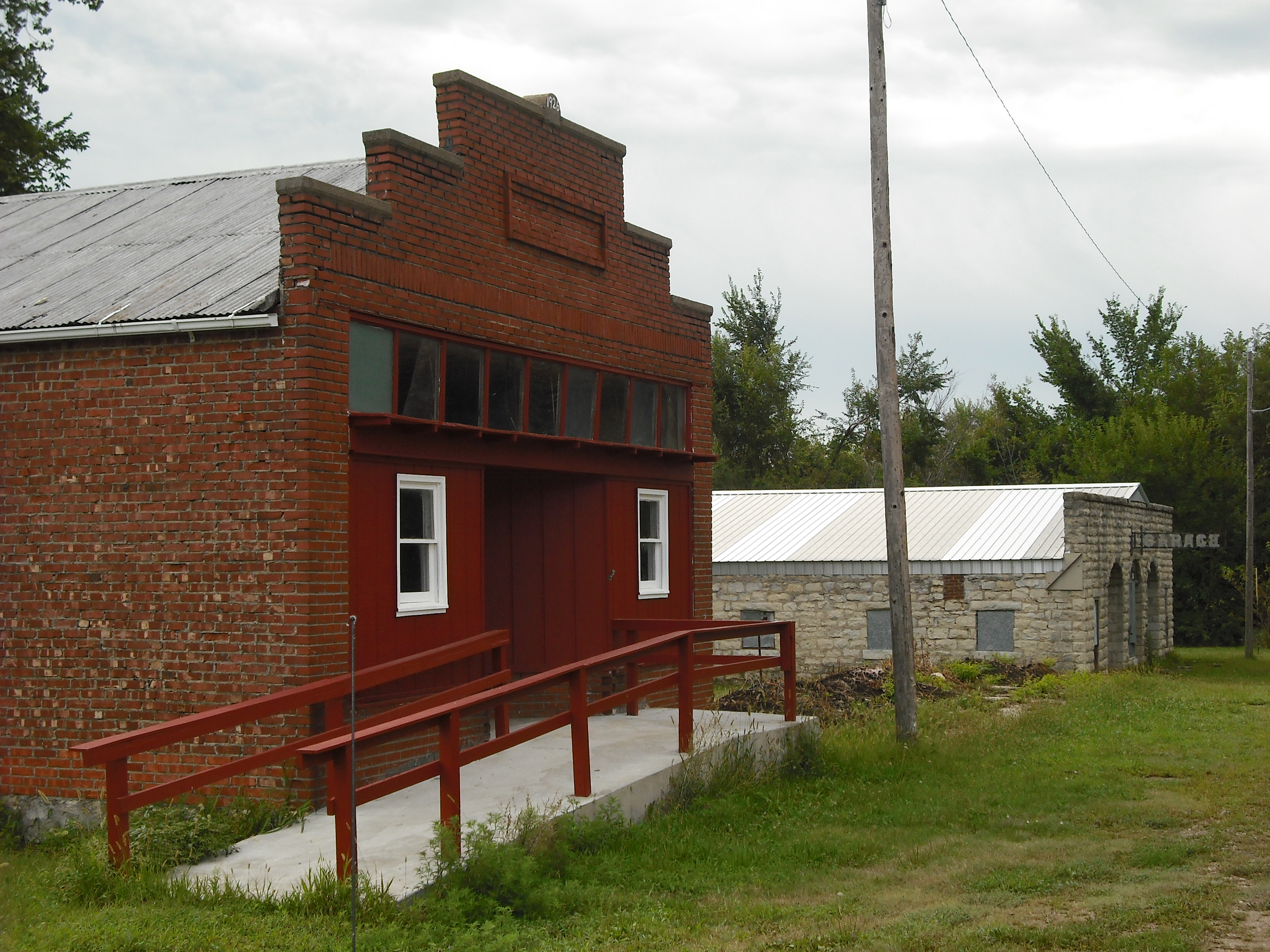
- Old Store and Garage in Bushong (2009)

- Location within Lyon County and Kansas

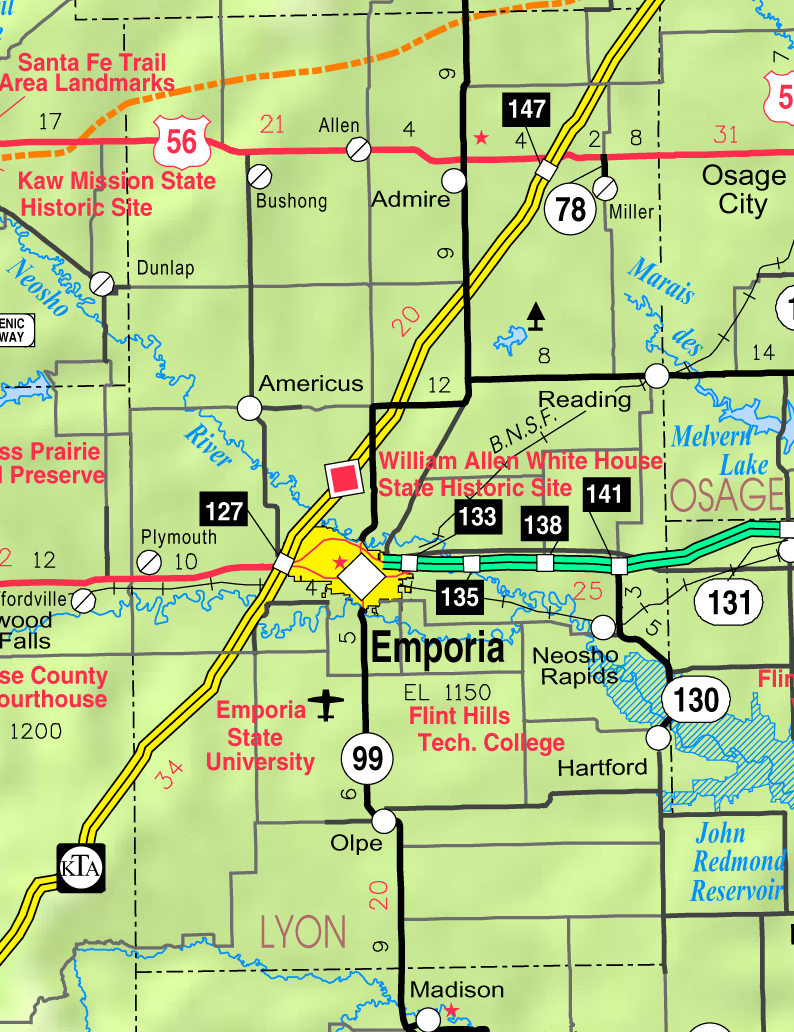
- KDOT map of Lyon County (legend)
- Coordinates: 38°38′34″N 96°15′24″W
- Country: United States
- State: Kansas
- County: Lyon
- Incorporated: 1923
- Named for: Doc Bushong

Government
  - Type: Mayor–Council

Area
  - Total: 0.15 sq mi (0.39 km^{2})
  - Land: 0.15 sq mi (0.39 km^{2})
  - Water: 0 sq mi (0.00 km^{2})
- Elevation: 1,385 ft (422 m)

Population (2020)
  - Total: 27
  - Density: 180/sq mi (69/km^{2})
- Time zone: UTC-6 (CST)
  - Summer (DST): UTC-5 (CDT)
- ZIP Code: 66833
- Area code: 620
- FIPS code: 20-09675
- GNIS ID: 2393479

Bushong is a city in Lyon County, Kansas, United States. As of the 2020 census, the population of the city was 27.

== History ==
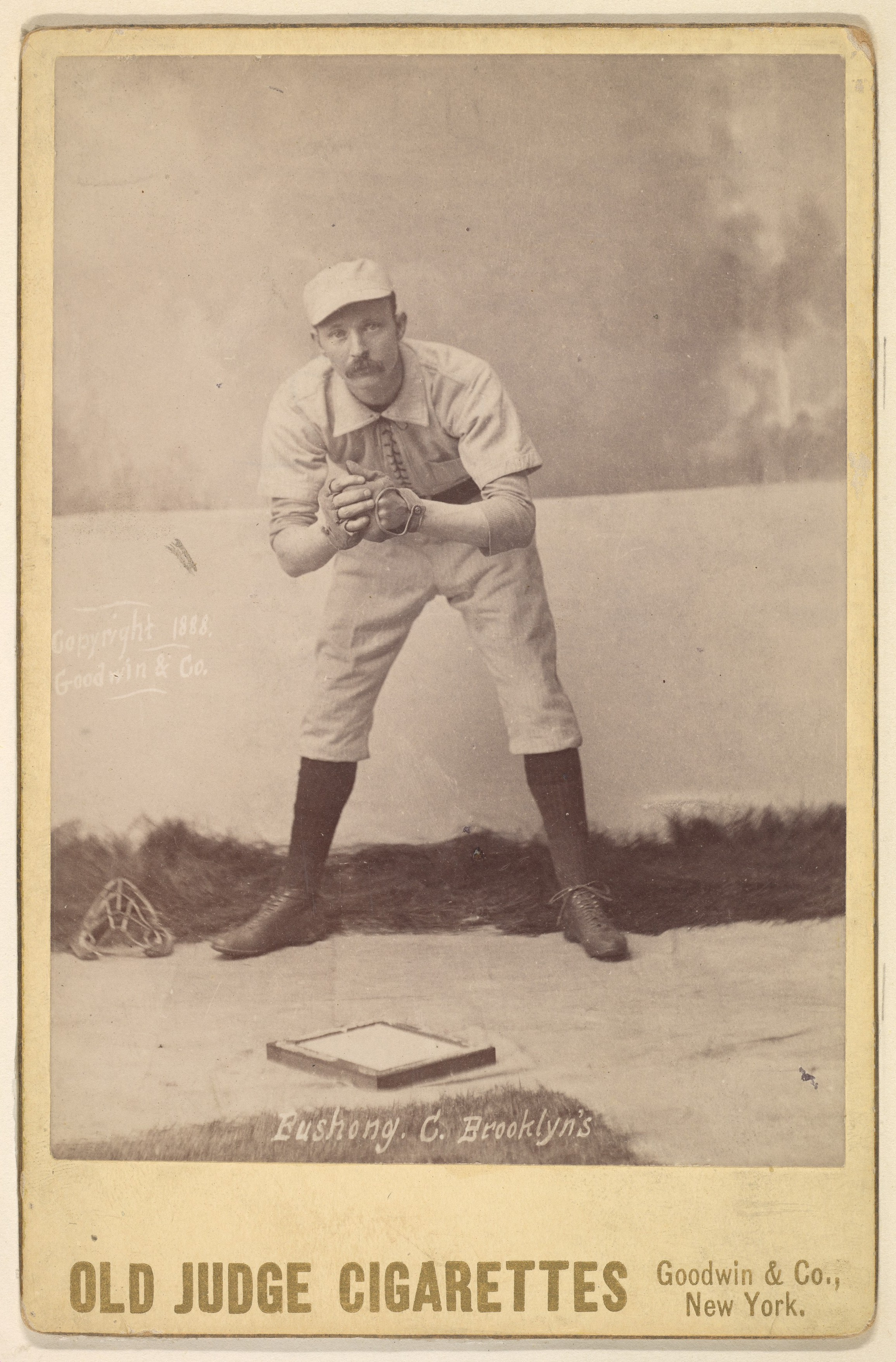
1888 Doc Bushong baseball card.

The city, originally a whistle-stop of the Missouri Pacific Railroad, was first named Weeks. The city took its present name in 1886 in honor of St. Louis Browns catcher Albert J. "Doc" Bushong. Following the Browns' victory in the 1886 World Series over the Chicago White Stockings, the Missouri Pacific Railroad honored several of the St. Louis players by naming some of their depots after the players. Bushong had played every game in the series and was at bat in Game Six, when the winning run scored by stealing home. The city of Bushong is the only one still carrying its name from the 1886 World Series.

During the Cold War, Bushong was the location of one of the first generations of nuclear-tipped intercontinental ballistic missiles. The site, active from 1961 to 1965, was part of the 548th Strategic Missile Squadron.

== Geography ==
According to the United States Census Bureau, the city has a total area of 0.15 square miles (0.39 km^{2}), all land.

== Demographics ==
Historical population
| Census | Pop. | Note | %± |
|---|---|---|---|
| 1930 | 193 | | — |
| 1940 | 135 | | −30.1% |
| 1950 | 93 | | −31.1% |
| 1960 | 51 | | −45.2% |
| 1970 | 39 | | −23.5% |
| 1980 | 62 | | 59.0% |
| 1990 | 57 | | −8.1% |
| 2000 | 55 | | −3.5% |
| 2010 | 34 | | −38.2% |
| 2020 | 27 | | −20.6% |
U.S. Decennial Census

Bushong is part of the Emporia Micropolitan Statistical Area.

=== 2020 census ===
The 2020 United States census counted 27 people, 16 households, and 12 families in Bushong. The population density was 177.6 per square mile (68.6/km^{2}). There were 18 housing units at an average density of 118.4 per square mile (45.7/km^{2}). The racial makeup was 92.59% (25) white or European American (88.89% non-Hispanic white), 0.0% (0) black or African-American, 0.0% (0) Native American or Alaska Native, 0.0% (0) Asian, 0.0% (0) Pacific Islander or Native Hawaiian, 0.0% (0) from other races, and 7.41% (2) from two or more races. Hispanic or Latino of any race was 11.11% (3) of the population.

Of the 16 households, 12.5% had children under the age of 18; 62.5% were married couples living together; 0.0% had a female householder with no spouse or partner present. 18.8% of households consisted of individuals and 6.2% had someone living alone who was 65 years of age or older. The average household size was 1.7 and the average family size was 1.8. The percent of those with a bachelor's degree or higher was estimated to be 0.0% of the population.

14.8% of the population was under the age of 18, 0.0% from 18 to 24, 7.4% from 25 to 44, 48.1% from 45 to 64, and 29.6% who were 65 years of age or older. The median age was 54.8 years. For every 100 females, there were 80.0 males. For every 100 females ages 18 and older, there were 91.7 males.

The 2016–2020 5-year American Community Survey estimates show that the median household income was $30,833 (with a margin of error of +/- $1,277) and the median family income was $30,938 (+/- $853). The median income for those above 16 years old was $30,938 (+/- $4,501).

=== 2010 census ===
As of the census of 2010, there were 34 people, 12 households, and 10 families residing in the city. The population density was 226.7 inhabitants per square mile (87.5/km^{2}). There were 16 housing units at an average density of 106.7 per square mile (41.2/km^{2}). The racial makeup of the city was 100.0% White.

There were 12 households, of which 41.7% had children under the age of 18 living with them, 66.7% were married couples living together, 8.3% had a female householder with no husband present, 8.3% had a male householder with no wife present, and 16.7% were non-families. 8.3% of all households were made up of individuals, and 8.3% had someone living alone who was 65 years of age or older. The average household size was 2.83 and the average family size was 3.10.

The median age in the city was 33 years. 26.5% of residents were under the age of 18; 14.7% were between the ages of 18 and 24; 23.5% were from 25 to 44; 26.5% were from 45 to 64; and 8.8% were 65 years of age or older. The gender makeup of the city was 52.9% male and 47.1% female.

=== 2000 census ===
As of the census of 2000, there were 55 people, 20 households, and 14 families residing in the city. The population density was 363.6 inhabitants per square mile (140.4/km^{2}). There were 22 housing units at an average density of 145.4 per square mile (56.1/km^{2}). The racial makeup of the city was 92.73% White, 1.82% African American, and 5.45% from two or more races. Hispanic or Latino of any race were 1.82% of the population.

There were 20 households, out of which 40.0% had children under the age of 18 living with them, 65.0% were married couples living together, and 30.0% were non-families. 30.0% of all households were made up of individuals, and none had someone living alone who was 65 years of age or older. The average household size was 2.75 and the average family size was 3.36.

In the city the age distribution of the population shows 29.1% under the age of 18, 7.3% from 18 to 24, 32.7% from 25 to 44, 23.6% from 45 to 64, and 7.3% who were 65 years of age or older. The median age was 32 years. For every 100 females, there were 111.5 males. For every 100 females age 18 and over, there were 143.8 males.

As of 2000 the median income for a household in the city was $26,250, and the median income for a family was $27,083. Males had a median income of $20,833 versus $27,500 for females. The per capita income for the city was $10,511. There were no families and 2.2% of the population living below the poverty line, including no under eighteens and none of those over 64.

== Education ==
The community is served by North Lyon County USD 251 public school district, and its headquarters are located in Americus. The Northern Heights High School is located east of Allen, and its mascot is the Wildcats. The NLC Elementary School and NLC Early Learning Center (preschool) are located in Americus.

== Transportation ==
U.S. Route 56 is located approximately 1 mile (1.6 km) north of Bushong. The closest Kansas Turnpike exit is located approximately 12.5 miles (20.1 km) east of Bushong, along U.S. Route 56.
