= Waterloo Township, Kansas =

Township in Lyon County, Kansas, U.S.

Waterloo Township
- Township
- Location in Lyon County
- Coordinates: 38.6883°N 96.0083°W
- Country: United States
- State: Kansas
- County: Lyon

Area
  - Total: 59.664 sq mi (154.53 km^{2})
  - Land: 59.17 sq mi (153.2 km^{2})
  - Water: 0.494 sq mi (1.28 km^{2}) 0.83%

Population (2020)
  - Total: 231
  - Density: 3.90/sq mi (1.51/km^{2})
- Time zone: UTC-6 (CST)
  - Summer (DST): UTC-5 (CDT)
- Area code: 620

Waterloo Township is a township in Lyon County, Kansas, United States.

== History ==
Waterloo Township was originally called Kanzas Center Township [sic], and under the latter name was established in 1857. It was renamed Waterloo Township in 1859.

== Geography ==
Waterloo Township covers an area of 59.664 square miles (154.53 square kilometers).

=== Communities ===
- Miller

=== Adjacent townships ===
- Plumb Township, Wabaunsee County (north)
- Burlingame Township, Osage County (northeast)
- Dragoon Township, Osage County (east-northeast)
- Grant Township, Osage County (east)
- Barclay Township, Osage County (southeast)
- Reading Township, Lyon County (south)
- Ivy Township, Lyon County (southwest)
- Agnes City Township, Lyon County (west)
- Wilmington Township, Wabaunsee County (northwest)

=== Major highways ===
- I-335
- US-56
- K-99
