= Fremont Township, Kansas =

Township in Lyon County, Kansas

Fremont Township
- Township
- Location in Lyon County
- Coordinates: 38.5136°N 96.1611°W
- Country: United States
- State: Kansas
- County: Lyon

Area
  - Total: 71.234 sq mi (184.50 km^{2})
  - Land: 70.749 sq mi (183.24 km^{2})
  - Water: 0.485 sq mi (1.26 km^{2}) 0.68%

Population (2020)
  - Total: 800
  - Density: 11/sq mi (4.4/km^{2})
- Time zone: UTC-6 (CST)
  - Summer (DST): UTC-5 (CDT)
- Area code: 620

Fremont Township is a township in Lyon County, Kansas, United States.

== History ==
Fremont Township was founded in 1859.

== Geography ==
Fremont Township covers an area of 71.234 square miles (184.50 square kilometers).

=== Adjacent townships ===
- Ivy Township, Lyon County (northeast)
- Reading Township, Lyon County (east)
- Jackson Township, Lyon County (southeast)
- Emporia Township, Lyon County (south)
- Americus Township, Lyon County (west)
- Agnes City Township, Lyon County (northwest)

=== Major highways ===
- I-335
- K-99
