= K22 =

K22 may refer to:

== Roads ==
- K-22 (Kansas highway)
- K-22 (1926–1931 Kansas highway)
- K-22 (1930–1938 Kansas highway)

== Vehicles ==
- Changhe Freedom K22, a Chinese pickup truck
- HMS K22, a K-class submarine of the Royal Navy
- HSwMS Gävle (K22), a corvette of the Swedish Navy
- Soviet submarine K-22

== Other uses ==
- K-22 trailer, part of the American SCR-270 radar system
- Big Sandy Regional Airport, in Martin County, Kentucky
- Smith & Wesson Model K-22, a revolver
- Symphony No. 5 (Mozart), K. 22, by Wolfgang Amadeus Mozart
- The k_{22} family of uniform polytopes
- Honda K Engines
