= Barclay Township, Kansas =

Township in Osage County, Kansas, U.S.

Barclay Township
- Township
- Location within Osage County
- Coordinates: 38.56425°N 95.866583°W
- Country: United States
- State: Kansas
- County: Osage

Area
  - Total: 48.167 sq mi (124.75 km^{2})
  - Land: 48.127 sq mi (124.65 km^{2})
  - Water: 0.04 sq mi (0.10 km^{2}) 0.08%
- Elevation: 1,181 ft (360 m)

Population (2020)
  - Total: 148
  - Density: 3.08/sq mi (1.19/km^{2})
- Time zone: UTC-6 (CST)
  - Summer (DST): UTC-5 (CDT)
- Area code: 785
- GNIS feature ID: 479592

Barclay Township is a township in Osage County, Kansas, United States. As of the 2020 census, its population was 148.

== Geography ==
Barclay Township covers an area of 48.167 square miles (124.75 square kilometers). The Marais des Cygnes River flows through it.

=== Communities ===
- Barclay

=== Adjacent townships ===
- Grant Township, Osage County (north)
- Superior Township, Osage County (northeast)
- Olivet Township, Osage County (east)
- Arvonia Township, Osage County (south)
- Reading Township, Lyon County (west)
- Waterloo Township, Lyon County (northwest)

== Transportation ==
=== Major highways ===
- K-170
