= Grant Township, Osage County, Kansas =

Township in Osage County, Kansas, U.S.

Grant Township
- Township
- Location within Osage County
- Coordinates: 38.666231°N 95.884892°W
- Country: United States
- State: Kansas
- County: Osage

Area
  - Total: 36.239 sq mi (93.86 km^{2})
  - Land: 36.193 sq mi (93.74 km^{2})
  - Water: 0.046 sq mi (0.12 km^{2}) 0.13%
- Elevation: 1,132 ft (345 m)

Population (2020)
  - Total: 286
  - Density: 7.90/sq mi (3.05/km^{2})
- Time zone: UTC-6 (CST)
  - Summer (DST): UTC-5 (CDT)
- Area code: 785
- GNIS feature ID: 479287

Grant Township is a township in Osage County, Kansas, United States. As of the 2020 census, its population was 286.

== Geography ==
Grant Township covers an area of 36.239 square miles (93.86 square kilometers).

=== Adjacent townships ===
- Dragoon Township, Osage County (north)
- Superior Township, Osage County (east)
- Barclay Township, Osage County (south)
- Reading Township, Lyon County (southwest)
- Waterloo Township, Lyon County (west)

== Transportation ==
=== Major highways ===
- US-56
- K-31
- K-170
