= K-22 (1930–1938 Kansas highway) =

Former state highway in Kansas, United States

K-22

Route information
- Maintained by KDOT
- Existed: mid 1930–March 25, 1938

Major junctions
- West end: US 54 / K-96 / US 81 / K-15 in Wichita
- East end: US 75 / US 40 / K-4 / K-10 in Topeka

Location
- Country: United States
- State: Kansas
- Counties: Sedgwick, Butler, Greenwood, Lyon, Osage, Shawnee

Highway system
- Kansas State Highway System; Interstate; US; State; Spurs
← K-22	→ K-23

K-22 was a state highway in the U.S. state of Kansas. It served as a direct link from Wichita to Topeka and completely overlapped other routes. The highway was designated mid 1930, and was decommissioned March 25, 1938.

== Route description ==
K-22 began in Wichita at a junction with US-54, K-96, US-81 and K-15. K-22 overlaps US-54 and K-96 east out of Wichita. From Augusta to El Dorado it overlapped US-77. In Tonovay the overlap with US-54 ended. In Emporia K-22 intersected US-50S and K-57. K-22 ended at K-4, K-10, US-40 and US-75 in Topeka.

== Major junctions ==
County	Location	mi	km	Destinations	Notes
Sedgwick	Wichita	0.000	0.000	US 54 west / K-96 west / US 81 / K-15	Western terminus; western end of US-54 and K-96 overlap
Butler	Augusta			US 77 south	Western end of US-77 overlap
Butler				K-96 east	Eastern end of K-96 overlap
Butler	El Dorado			US 77 north	Eastern end of US-77 overlap
Greenwood				K-11 south	Western end of K-11 overlap
Greenwood	Tonovay			US 54 east	Western end of US-54 overlap
Lyon	Emporia			US 50S / K-57	
Lyon				K-70 east	Western terminus of K-70
Lyon				US 50N west / K-11 north	Eastern end of K-11 overlap; western end of US-50N overlap
Osage				K-31 south	Western end of K-31 overlap
Osage	Burlingame			K-31 north	Eastern end of K-31 overlap
Osage				US 50N east / US 75 south	Eastern end of US-50N overlap; western end of US-75 overlap
Shawnee	Topeka			US 75 north / US 40 / K-4 / K-10	Eastern terminus; eastern end of US-75 overlap
1.000 mi = 1.609 km; 1.000 km = 0.621 mi: Concurrency terminus
