= Emporia Township, Kansas =

Township in Lyon County, Kansas, U.S.

Emporia Township
- Township
- Location in Lyon County
- Coordinates: 38.3692°N 96.1667°W
- Country: United States
- State: Kansas
- County: Lyon

Area
  - Total: 53.392 sq mi (138.28 km^{2})
  - Land: 52.286 sq mi (135.42 km^{2})
  - Water: 1.106 sq mi (2.86 km^{2}) 2.07%

Population (2020)
  - Total: 911
  - Density: 17.4/sq mi (6.73/km^{2})
- Time zone: UTC-6 (CST)
  - Summer (DST): UTC-5 (CDT)
- Area code: 620

Emporia Township is a township in Lyon County, Kansas, United States.

== History ==
Emporia Township was founded in 1857.

== Geography ==
Emporia Township covers an area of 53.392 square miles (128.28 square kilometers).

=== Adjacent townships ===
- Fremont Township, Lyon County (north)
- Jackson Township, Lyon County (east)
- Elmendaro Township, Lyon County (southeast)
- Center Township, Lyon County (southwest)
- Pike Township, Lyon County (west)
- Americus Township, Lyon County (northwest)

=== Major highways ===
- I-35
- I-335
- US-50
- K-99
