= Township 1, Morris County, Kansas =

Township in Morris County, Kansas, U.S.

Township 1
- Township
- Location within Morris County
- Coordinates: 38.573228°N 96.449512°W
- Country: United States
- State: Kansas
- County: Morris

Area
  - Total: 137.624 sq mi (356.44 km^{2})
  - Land: 136.778 sq mi (354.25 km^{2})
  - Water: 0.846 sq mi (2.19 km^{2}) 0.61%

Population (2020)
  - Total: 476
  - Density: 3.48/sq mi (1.34/km^{2})
- Time zone: UTC-6 (CST)
  - Summer (DST): UTC-5 (CDT)
- Area code(s): 620, 785

Township 1 is a township in Morris County, Kansas, United States. As of the 2020 census, its population was 476.

== Geography ==
Township 1 covers an area of 137.624 square miles (356.44 square kilometers). The Neosho River flows through it.

=== Communities ===
- Dunlap

=== Adjacent townships ===
- Township 2, Morris County (north)
- Agnes City Township, Lyon County (northeast)
- Americus Township, Lyon County (east)
- Toledo Township, Chase County (southeast)
- Strong Township, Chase County (south)
- Diamond Creek Township, Chase County (southwest)
- Township 9, Morris County (west)

=== Major highways ===
- US-56
- K-177
