= K-170 (Kansas highway) =

State highway in Kansas, U.S.

K-170
- K-170 highlighted in red

Route information
- Maintained by KDOT
- Length: 21.759 mi (35.018 km)
- Existed: c. 1930–present
- History: Renumbered from K-70 to K-170 on October 31, 1957

Major junctions
- West end: K-99 west of Reading
- East end: K-31 in Osage City

Location
- Country: United States
- State: Kansas
- Counties: Lyon, Osage

Highway system
- Kansas State Highway System; Interstate; US; State; Spurs
← US-169	→ K-171

K-170 is a 21.759-mile-long (35.018 km) state highway in the U.S. State of Kansas. K-170's western terminus is at K-99 about 12 miles (19 km) north of Emporia, and the eastern terminus is at K-31 on the west side of Osage City, a mile south of the K-31 intersection with U.S. Route 56 (US-56). K-170 provides access, via county roads, to Lyons County State Fishing Lake.

The highway that became K-170 was first designated by 1930 as K-70, from K-11 and K-22 east to Reading. K-11 was renumbered to K-99, and K-22 was decommissioned in 1938. Then in 1946, the highway was extended east to end in Osage City. In 1957, K-70 was renumbered to K-170 to avoid a numbering confusion with Interstate 70 (I-70).

== Route description ==
K-170's western terminus is at an intersection with K-99 northeast of Emporia. The highway begins traveling east through flat rural farmlands, and after about .5 miles (0.80 km) it crosses Badger Creek, a tributary of the Neosho River. The highway continues east for 1.5 miles (2.4 km) then intersects Road T, which travels north to Lyon County State Lake. It continues east for 5.3 miles (8.5 km) through more flat rural farmlands then enters the city of Reading. It travels approximately .8 miles (1.3 km) through the city. As the highway exits the city it also crosses into Osage County. Soon after crossing the county line, the highway expands to four lanes and has an at-grade crossing with a BNSF Railway track. K-170 quickly downgrades back to two lanes and crosses the Marias des Cygnes River about one mile (1.6 km) later. The highway then continues east for about two miles (3.2 km) then crosses Cherry Creek.

Roughly 1.2 miles (1.9 km) past Cherry Creek it crosses Little Cable Creek, then Cable Creek about one mile (1.6 km) later. After crossing Cable Creek, it intersects West 301st Street, which leads to the Eisenhower State Park. At this point, K-170 curves north and travels approximately 3.7 miles (6.0 km) then crosses Mute Creek. It continues north for about .3 miles (0.48 km) then intersects West 269th Street, which leads west to the unincorporated community of Barclay. From this point, it continues north roughly two miles (3.2 km) and enters Osage City. The highway passes by Osage City Reservoir, then expands to four lanes and has an at-grade crossing with the BNSF Railroad track again. K-170 then briefly exits the city and transitions back to two lanes. It then crosses Salt Creek as it reenters the city as Martin Street. The roadway continues north through the city for about .6 miles (0.97 km) then reaches its eastern terminus at K-31 in Osage City.

K-170 is signed as east–west its entire length, even though the section from West 301st Street to K-31 runs directly north–south. The Kansas Department of Transportation (KDOT) tracks the traffic levels on its highways, and in 2017, they determined that on average the traffic varied from 430 vehicles per day east of Reading to 1,150 vehicles per day south of the terminus of K-31. K-170 is not included in the National Highway System. (Note: The National Highway System is a system of highways important to the nation's defense, economy, and mobility.)

== History ==
Marker used for National Old Trails Road

Before state highways were numbered in Kansas there were auto trails, which were an informal network of marked routes that existed in the United States and Canada in the early part of the 20th century. The eastern terminus (K-31) was part of the former National Old Trails Road, which was established in 1912, and stretched from Baltimore, Maryland to California. K-31 also followed the Old Santa Fe Trail, which was established in 1821, and connected Santa Fe, New Mexico with Franklin, Missouri.

K-170 was commissioned as K-70 by 1930, with the designation applying to a highway running from K-11 and K-22 east to Reading. K-11 was renumbered to K-99 on May 17, 1938, along with Oklahoma and Nebraska doing the same to make a three-state, continuous Highway 99. Also the K-22 designation was removed between January and July 1938. In a resolution on December 12, 1945, it was approved to extend K-70 from Reading east then north to Osage City as soon as Osage County had brought the road up to state highway standards. Then in a resolution on October 23, 1946, it was extended, as the county had finished required projects. By late 1957, a majority of I-70 had been completed within Kansas and on October 31, 1957, K-70 was renumbered to K-170 to avoid a numbering confusion with I-70.

== Major intersections ==
County	Location	mi	km	Destinations	Notes
Lyon	Reading Township	0.000	0.000	K-99 – Emporia, Admire, Alma	Western terminus; road continues as Road 250
Osage	Osage City	21.759	35.018	K-31 – Lyndon, Burlingame	Eastern terminus; highway continues north as K-31 (Martin Street)
1.000 mi = 1.609 km; 1.000 km = 0.621 mi
