= Admire, Kansas =

City in Lyon County, Kansas

- City
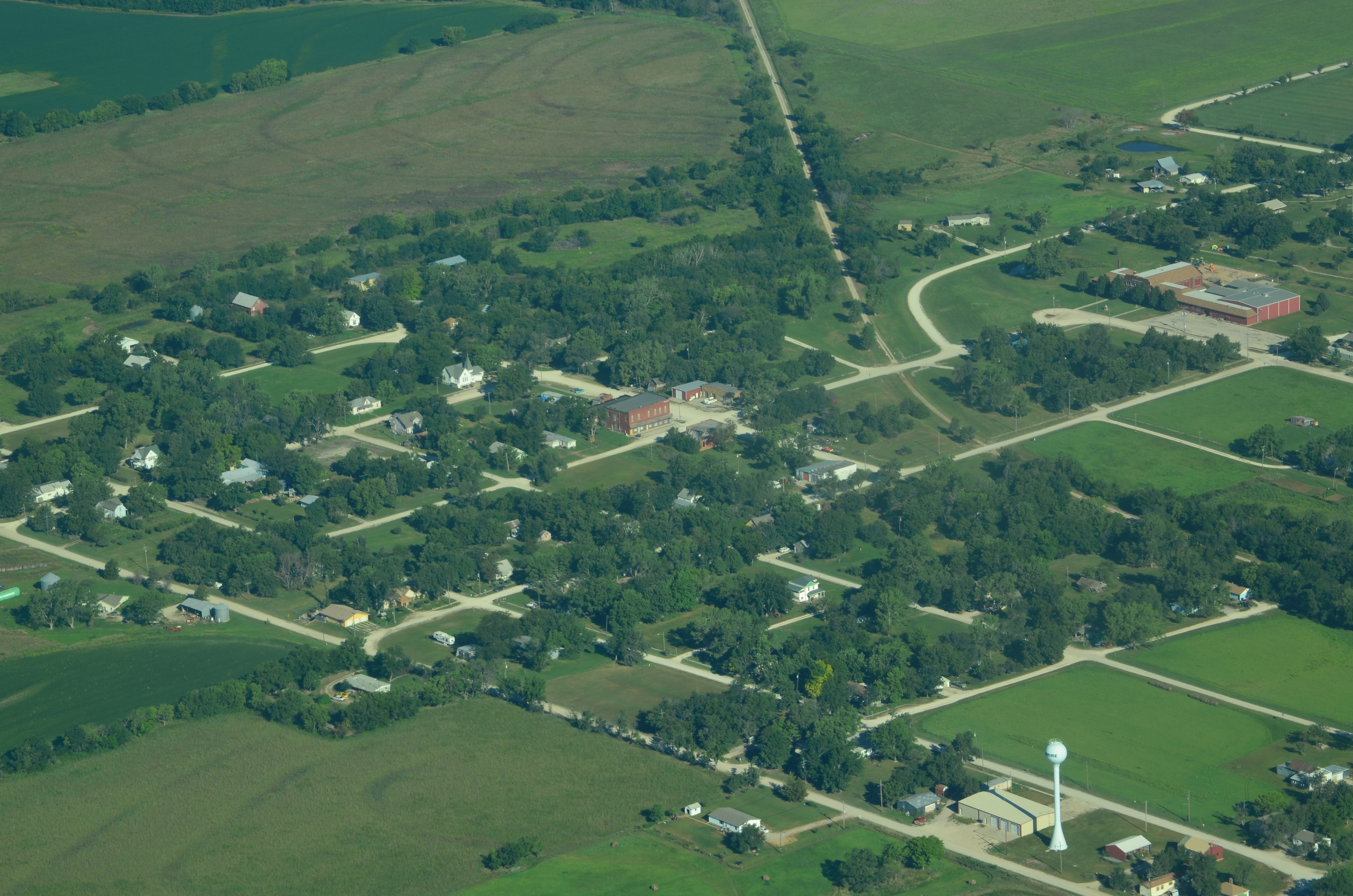
- Aerial view of Admire (2013)

- Location within Lyon County and Kansas

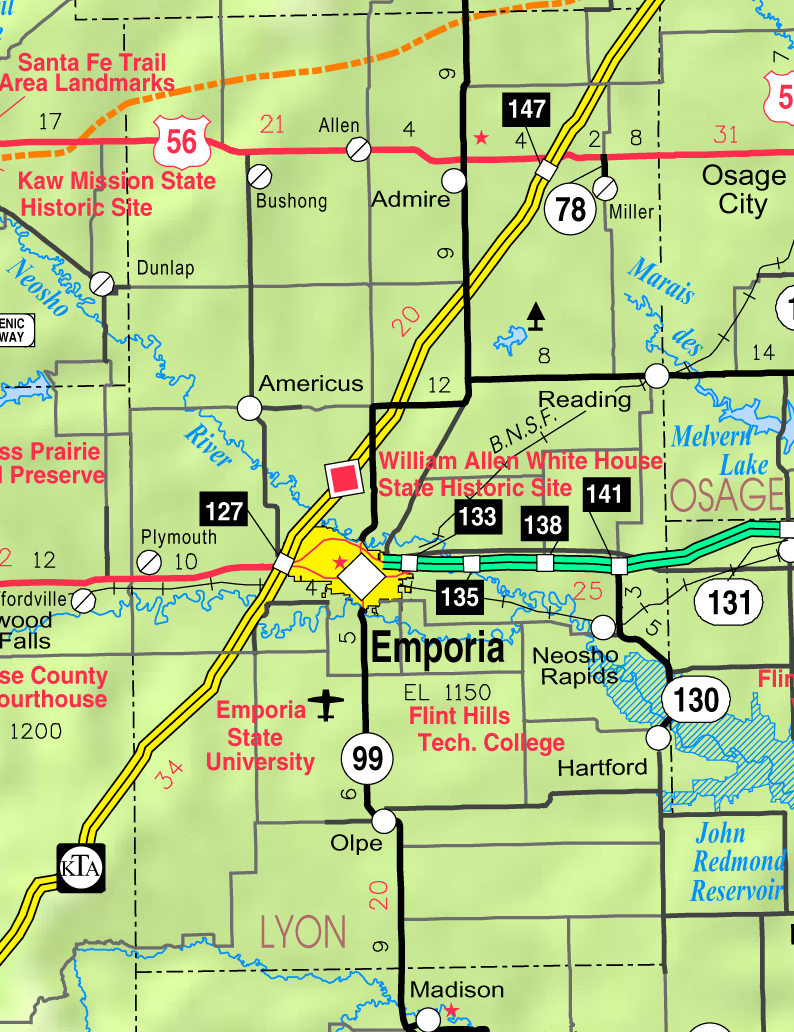
- KDOT map of Lyon County (legend)
- Coordinates: 38°38′28″N 96°06′07″W
- Country: United States
- State: Kansas
- County: Lyon
- Founded: 1886
- Incorporated: 1916
- Named for: Jacob Admire

Government
  - Type: Mayor–Council

Area
  - Total: 0.32 sq mi (0.84 km^{2})
  - Land: 0.32 sq mi (0.84 km^{2})
  - Water: 0 sq mi (0.00 km^{2})
- Elevation: 1,234 ft (376 m)

Population (2020)
  - Total: 130
  - Density: 400/sq mi (150/km^{2})
- Time zone: UTC-6 (CST)
  - Summer (DST): UTC-5 (CDT)
- ZIP Code: 66830
- Area code: 620
- FIPS code: 20-00325
- GNIS ID: 2393883
- Website: cityofadmire.com

Admire is a city in Lyon County, Kansas, United States. As of the 2020 census, the population of the city was 130.

== History ==
Admire was founded in 1886. It was named for one of its founders, Jacob Admire.

The first post office in Admire was established in November 1886.

Admire was a station and shipping point on the Missouri Pacific Railroad. By the mid-1990s, rail service in Admire had been discontinued, and the tracks are now being used as a rail trail.

Admire's current acting mayor is Donna Uhl. The former mayor, prior to January 2024, was Robert Reust.

== Geography ==
According to the United States Census Bureau, the city has a total area of 0.33 square miles (0.85 km^{2}), all land.

== Demographics ==
Historical population
Census	Pop.	Note	%±
1920	205		—
1930	263		28.3%
1940	270		2.7%
1950	184		−31.9%
1960	149		−19.0%
1970	144		−3.4%
1980	158		9.7%
1990	147		−7.0%
2000	177		20.4%
2010	156		−11.9%
2020	130		−16.7%
U.S. Decennial Census

Admire is part of the Emporia Micropolitan Statistical Area.

=== 2020 census ===
The 2020 United States census counted 130 people, 48 households, and 38 families in Admire. The population density was 402.5 per square mile (155.4/km^{2}). There were 59 housing units at an average density of 182.7 per square mile (70.5/km^{2}). The racial makeup was 95.38% (124) white or European American (85.38% non-Hispanic white), 0.0% (0) black or African-American, 3.08% (4) Native American or Alaska Native, 0.0% (0) Asian, 0.0% (0) Pacific Islander or Native Hawaiian, 0.77% (1) from other races, and 0.77% (1) from two or more races. Hispanic or Latino of any race was 10.77% (14) of the population.

Of the 48 households, 37.5% had children under the age of 18; 62.5% were married couples living together; 10.4% had a female householder with no spouse or partner present. 14.6% of households consisted of individuals and 8.3% had someone living alone who was 65 years of age or older. The average household size was 2.3 and the average family size was 2.7. The percent of those with a bachelor's degree or higher was estimated to be 10.8% of the population.

23.1% of the population was under the age of 18, 11.5% from 18 to 24, 21.5% from 25 to 44, 27.7% from 45 to 64, and 16.2% who were 65 years of age or older. The median age was 39.5 years. For every 100 females, there were 106.3 males. For every 100 females ages 18 and older, there were 122.2 males.

The 2016–2020 5-year American Community Survey estimates show that the median household income was $45,529 (with a margin of error of +/- $2,699) and the median family income was $46,200 (+/- $8,733). Males had a median income of $31,202 (+/- $1,315) versus $15,600 (+/- $3,906) for females. Approximately, 6.9% of families and 10.7% of the population were below the poverty line, including 31.6% of those under the age of 18 and 0.0% of those ages 65 or over.

=== 2010 census ===
As of the census of 2010, there were 156 people, 60 households, and 43 families living in the city. The population density was 472.7 inhabitants per square mile (182.5/km^{2}). There were 70 housing units at an average density of 212.1 per square mile (81.9/km^{2}). The racial makeup of the city was 95.5% White, 0.6% from other races, and 3.8% from two or more races. Hispanic or Latino of any race were 7.1% of the population.

There were 60 households, of which 33.3% had children under the age of 18 living with them, 60.0% were married couples living together, 8.3% had a female householder with no husband present, 3.3% had a male householder with no wife present, and 28.3% were non-families. 28.3% of all households were made up of individuals, and 15% had someone living alone who was 65 years of age or older. The average household size was 2.60 and the average family size was 3.16.

The median age in the city was 32.5 years. 26.3% of residents were under the age of 18; 9% were between the ages of 18 and 24; 23.1% were from 25 to 44; 25.7% were from 45 to 64; and 16% were 65 years of age or older. The gender makeup of the city was 47.4% male and 52.6% female.

== Education ==
The community is served by North Lyon County USD 251 public school district, and its headquarters are located in Americus. The Northern Heights High School is located east of Allen, and its mascot is the Wildcats. The NLC Elementary School and NLC Early Learning Center (preschool) are located in Americus.

Currently, there is no elementary school in Admire; the old elementary school building has been converted into the Admire Community Center.

== Transportation ==
U.S. Route 56 is located approximately 0.5 miles (0.80 km) north of Admire. The closest Kansas Turnpike exit is located approximately 3.5 miles (5.6 km) east of Admire along U.S. Route 56.

== Notable people ==
- Alvin Johnston, test pilot
