= Emporia micropolitan area, Kansas =

Emporia, KS Area
- Micropolitan Statistical Area
- Emporia, KS Micropolitan Statistical Area
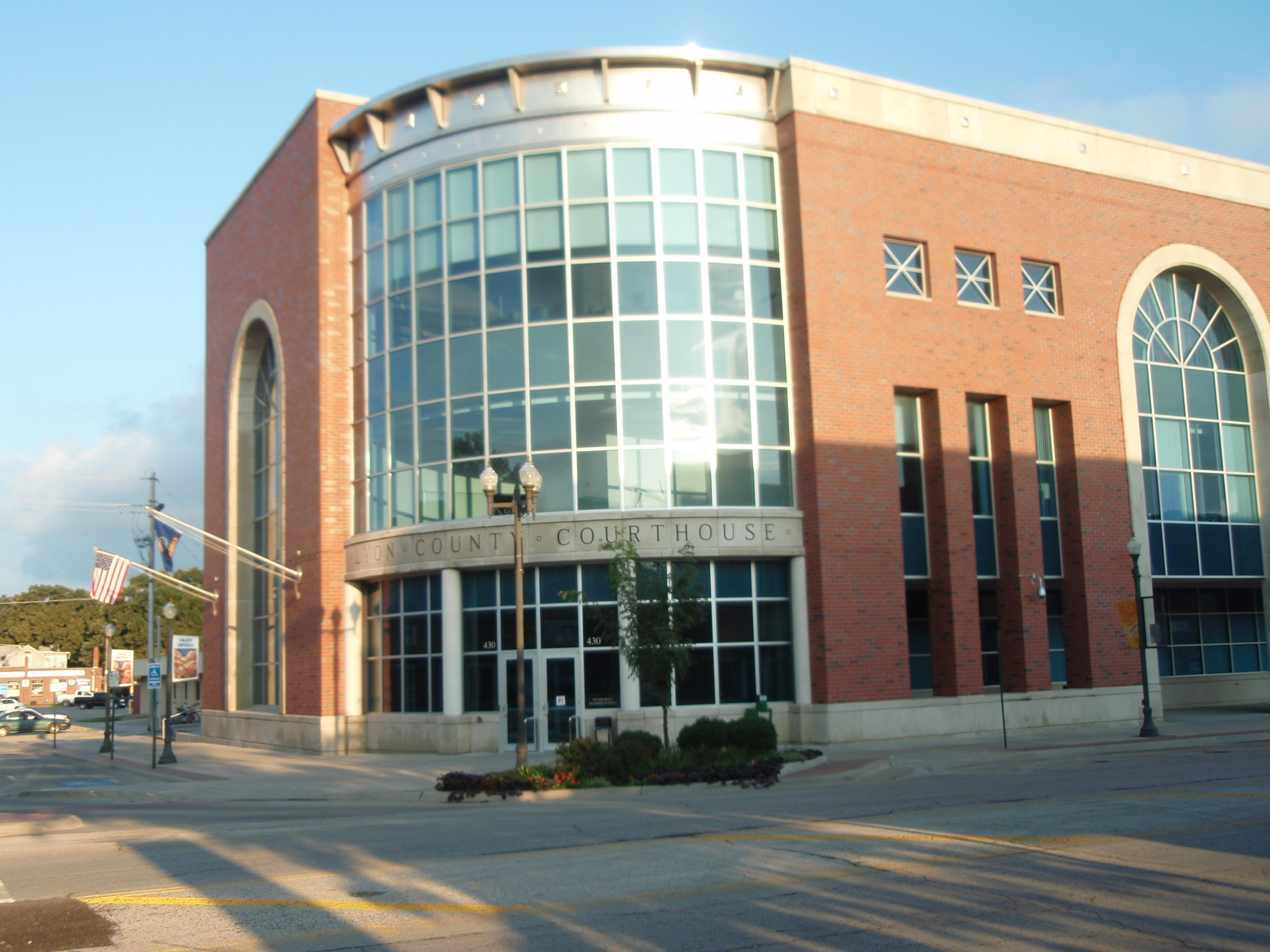
- Lyon County Courthouse in Emporia (2009)
Interactive Map of Emporia, KS μSA
City of Emporia
Emporia, KS μSA
- Country: United States
- State: Kansas
- Largest city: Emporia
- Time zone: UTC−6 (CST)
  - Summer (DST): UTC−5 (CDT)

The Emporia Micropolitan Statistical Area, as defined by the United States Census Bureau, is an area consisting of two counties in Kansas, anchored by the city of Emporia.

As of the 2000 census, the μSA had a population of 38,965 (though a July 1, 2009 estimate placed the population at 36,399).

== Counties ==
- Chase
- Lyon

== Communities ==
- Places with more than 20,000 inhabitants
  - Emporia (Principal city)
- Places with 500 to 1,000 inhabitants
  - Americus
  - Cottonwood Falls
  - Hartford
  - Olpe
  - Strong City
- Places with fewer than 500 inhabitants
  - Admire
  - Allen
  - Neosho Rapids
  - Bushong
  - Reading
  - Cedar Point
  - Elmdale
  - Matfield Green
- Unincorporated places
  - Bazaar

== Demographics ==
As of the census of 2000, there were 38,965 people, 14,937 households, and 9,456 families residing within the μSA. The racial makeup of the μSA was 84.33% White, 2.17% African American, 0.47% Native American, 1.89% Asian, 0.01% Pacific Islander, 9.07% from other races, and 2.05% from two or more races. Hispanic or Latino of any race were 15.56% of the population.

The median income for a household in the μSA was $32,738, and the median income for a family was $41,480. Males had a median income of $28,134 versus $21,433 for females. The per capita income for the μSA was $16,573.

== See also ==
- Kansas census statistical areas
