= Reading, Kansas =

City in Lyon County, Kansas

- City
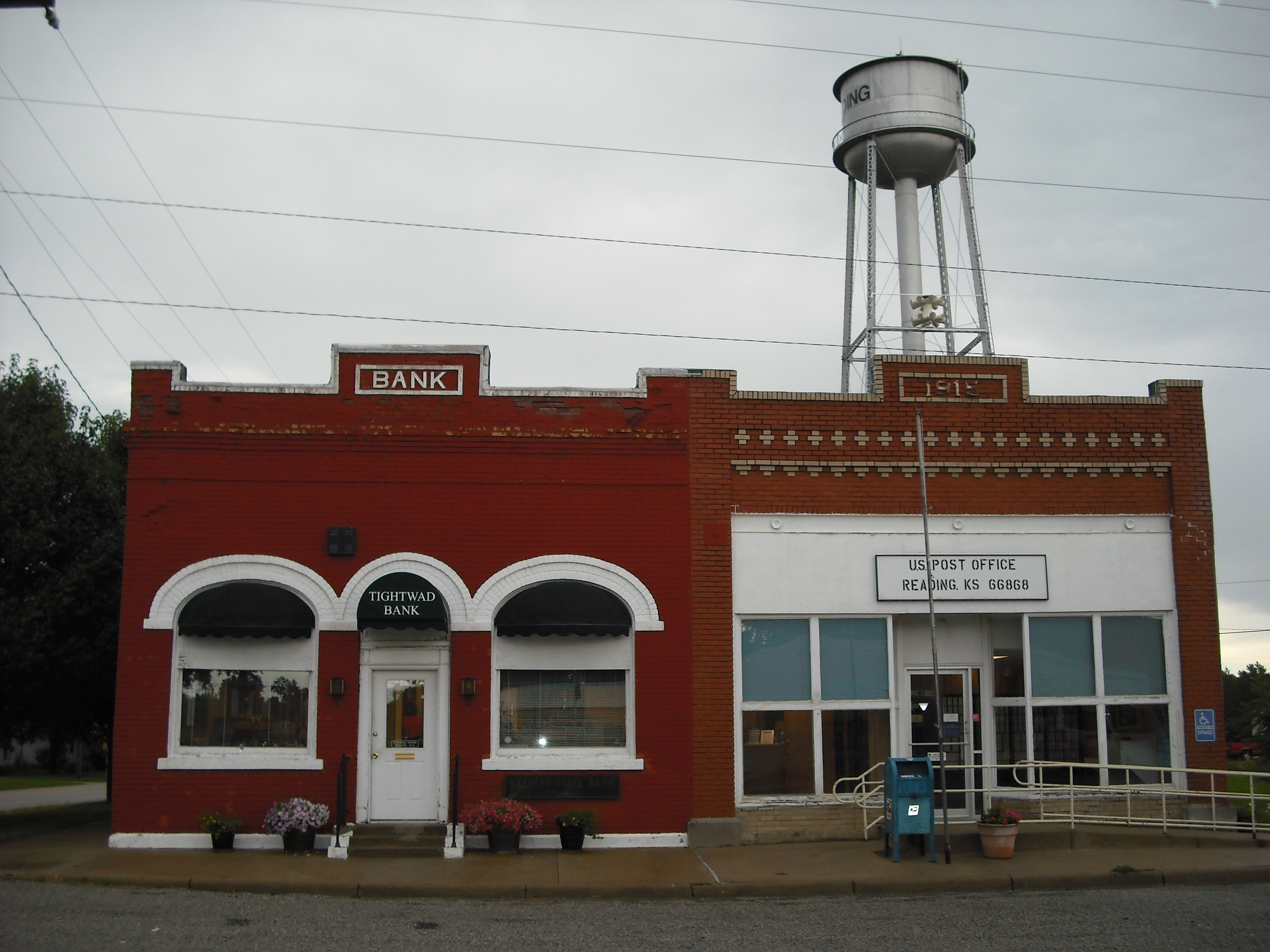
- Downtown Reading (2009) (prior to tornado)

- Location within Lyon County and Kansas

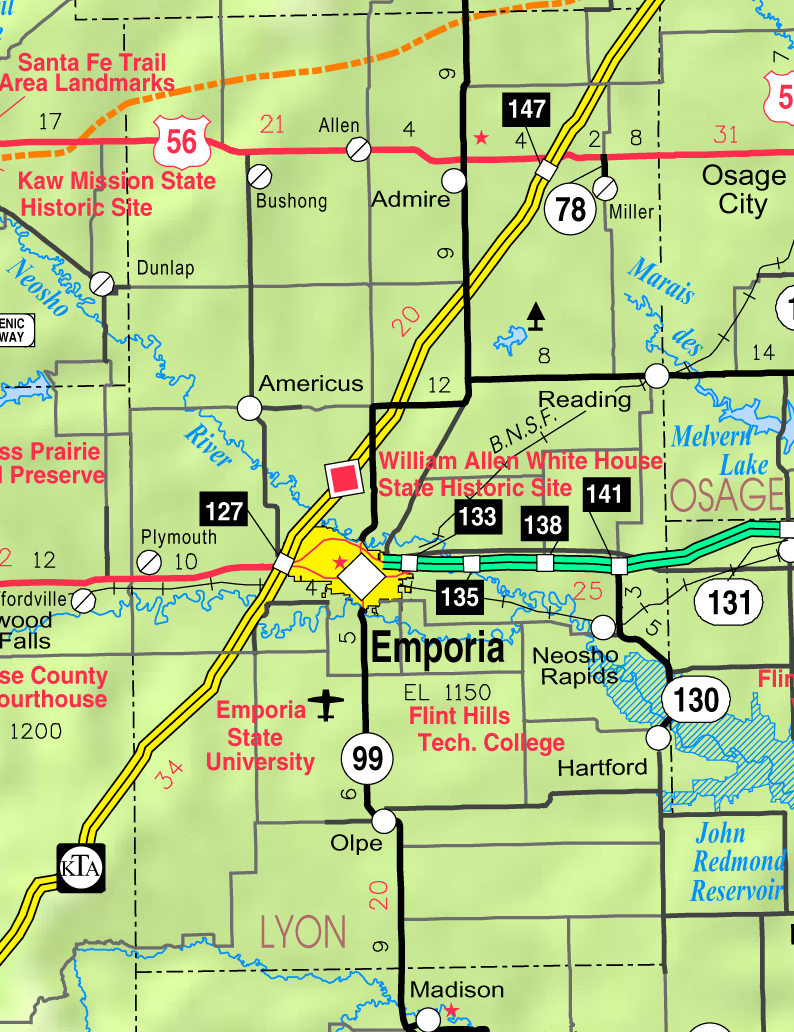
- KDOT map of Lyon County (legend)
- Coordinates: 38°31′09″N 95°57′27″W
- Country: United States
- State: Kansas
- County: Lyon
- Founded: 1870
- Platted: 1870
- Incorporated: 1890
- Named for: Reading, Pennsylvania

Government
  - Type: Mayor–Council

Area
  - Total: 0.21 sq mi (0.55 km^{2})
  - Land: 0.21 sq mi (0.55 km^{2})
  - Water: 0 sq mi (0.00 km^{2})
- Elevation: 1,093 ft (333 m)

Population (2020)
  - Total: 181
  - Density: 850/sq mi (330/km^{2})
- Time zone: UTC-6 (CST)
  - Summer (DST): UTC-5 (CDT)
- ZIP Code: 66868
- Area code: 620
- FIPS code: 20-58600
- GNIS ID: 2396331
- Website: readingks.com

Reading is a city in Lyon County, Kansas, United States. As of the 2020 census, the population of the city was 181.

== History ==
For millennia, the land that is currently Kansas was inhabited by Native Americans. In 1803, the United States secured most of modern Kansas as part of the Louisiana Purchase. In 1854, Congress organized the Kansas Territory and in 1861, Kansas became the 34th state.

In 1863, by Act of Congress and similarly by an act of the State of Kansas, the Atchison, Topeka and Santa Fe Railway was granted 3,000,000 acres of Kansas land on the condition that it would build a continuous line to the western border of Kansas by March 1, 1873. On Oct. 30, 1868, construction began at Topeka. By Sept. 14, 1870, the first Santa Fe train reached Emporia, fifteen miles past the present site of Reading. James Fagan, agent for the railroad lands, and T. J. Peter and M. S. Sargent, who represented the railroad interest, organized a town company, with James Fagan as president. The land was owned by McMann & Co., of Reading, Pennsylvania. The town was platted on sixty acres of Section 3, Township 18, Range 13, and called it Reading, after Reading, Pennsylvania. In summer 1870, the town site was surveyed.

The first post office in Reading was established in August 1870. Reading was incorporated as a city in September 1890.

=== 2011 tornado ===
On May 21, 2011 around 9:15 p.m., an EF3 tornado hit Reading. It was three blocks wide and stayed on the ground for about four miles. The tornado destroyed at least 56 of 110 homes and 14 of 21 businesses. The post office and fire station suffered major damage. One person died and two were hospitalized. Early damage estimates topped $2.2 million.

In just over a year, the community rebuilt itself with some help of the Federal Emergency Management Agency. Most of the town has been rebuilt as of 2023.

== Geography ==
Reading is located at 38°31′09″N 95°57′33″W (38.519102, -95.959091) at the eastern edge of Lyon County. It is fifteen miles northeast of Emporia and fourteen miles southwest of Osage City, along Highway 170. According to the United States Census Bureau, the city has a total area of 0.20 square miles (0.52 km^{2}), all land.

=== Climate ===
The climate in this area is characterized by hot, humid summers and generally mild to cool winters. According to the Köppen Climate Classification system, Reading has a humid subtropical climate, abbreviated "Cfa" on climate maps.

== Demographics ==
Historical population
Census	Pop.	Note	%±
1880	120		—
1900	304		—
1910	289		−4.9%
1920	358		23.9%
1930	341		−4.7%
1940	302		−11.4%
1950	289		−4.3%
1960	249		−13.8%
1970	247		−0.8%
1980	244		−1.2%
1990	264		8.2%
2000	247		−6.4%
2010	231		−6.5%
2020	181		−21.6%
U.S. Decennial Census

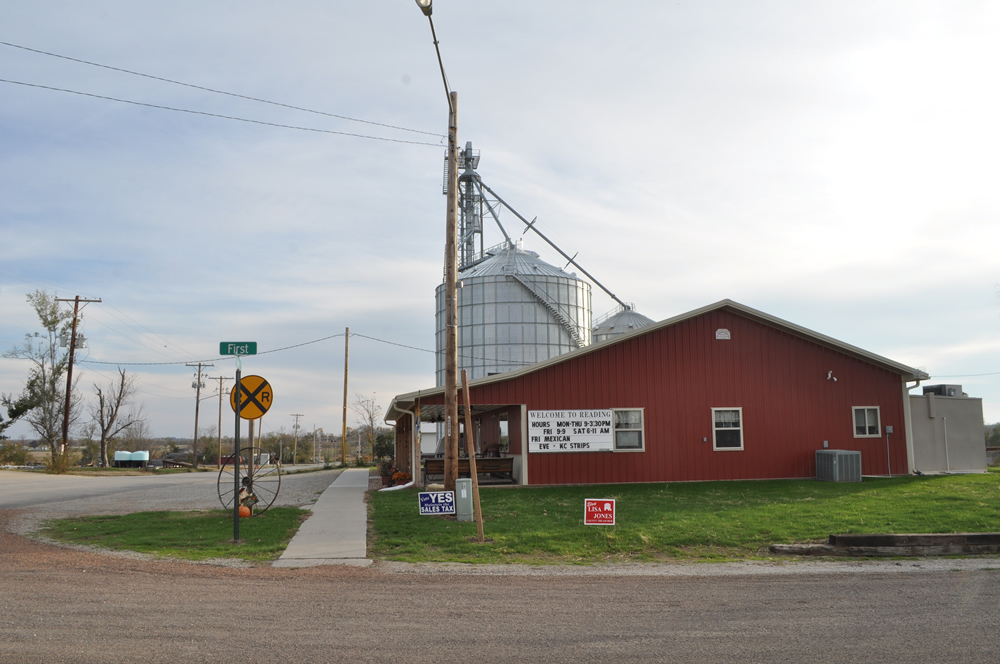
Reading Community Center, Reading Café, Grain Elevator (replaced after tornado).

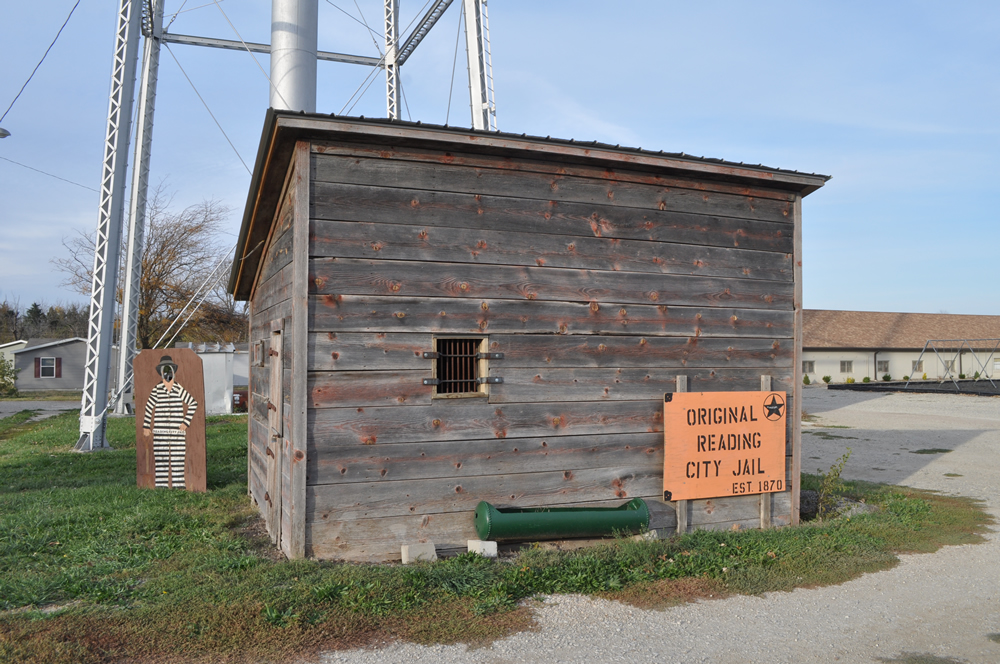
1870s Reading Jailhouse next to Reading Water Tower.

Reading is part of the Emporia Micropolitan Statistical Area.

=== 2020 census ===
The 2020 United States census counted 181 people, 80 households, and 57 families in Reading. The population density was 849.8 per square mile (328.1/km^{2}). There were 80 housing units at an average density of 375.6 per square mile (145.0/km^{2}). The racial makeup was 95.58% (173) white or European American (95.58% non-Hispanic white), 0.0% (0) black or African-American, 0.0% (0) Native American or Alaska Native, 0.0% (0) Asian, 0.0% (0) Pacific Islander or Native Hawaiian, 1.66% (3) from other races, and 2.76% (5) from two or more races. Hispanic or Latino of any race was 1.1% (2) of the population.

Of the 80 households, 36.2% had children under the age of 18; 47.5% were married couples living together; 26.2% had a female householder with no spouse or partner present. 23.8% of households consisted of individuals and 7.5% had someone living alone who was 65 years of age or older. The average household size was 2.4 and the average family size was 2.7. The percent of those with a bachelor's degree or higher was estimated to be 6.6% of the population.

26.5% of the population was under the age of 18, 10.5% from 18 to 24, 20.4% from 25 to 44, 28.2% from 45 to 64, and 14.4% who were 65 years of age or older. The median age was 42.3 years. For every 100 females, there were 110.5 males. For every 100 females ages 18 and older, there were 104.6 males.

The 2016–2020 5-year American Community Survey estimates show that the median household income was $46,250 (with a margin of error of +/- $24,821) and the median family income was $54,375 (+/- $18,273). Males had a median income of $31,528 (+/- $10,170) versus $20,139 (+/- $2,746) for females. The median income for those above 16 years old was $25,000 (+/- $6,708). Approximately, 9.8% of families and 20.8% of the population were below the poverty line, including 53.6% of those under the age of 18 and 2.6% of those ages 65 or over.

=== 2010 census ===
As of the census of 2010, there were 231 people, 86 households, and 62 families residing in the city. The population density was 1,155.0 inhabitants per square mile (445.9/km^{2}). There were 103 housing units at an average density of 515.0 per square mile (198.8/km^{2}). The racial makeup of the city was 100.0% White. Hispanic or Latino of any race were 3.9% of the population.

There were 86 households, of which 46.5% had children under the age of 18 living with them, 52.3% were married couples living together, 12.8% had a female householder with no husband present, 7.0% had a male householder with no wife present, and 27.9% were non-families. 24.4% of all households were made up of individuals, and 8.2% had someone living alone who was 65 years of age or older. The average household size was 2.69 and the average family size was 3.15.

The median age in the city was 32.9 years. 33.8% of residents were under the age of 18; 5.1% were between the ages of 18 and 24; 27.2% were from 25 to 44; 26.4% were from 45 to 64; and 7.4% were 65 years of age or older. The gender makeup of the city was 53.7% male and 46.3% female.

=== 2000 census ===
As of the census of 2000, there were 247 people, 92 households, and 63 families residing in the city. The population density was 1,185.3 inhabitants per square mile (457.6/km^{2}). There were 108 housing units at an average density of 518.3 per square mile (200.1/km^{2}). The racial makeup of the city was 97.98% White, 0.40% African American, and 1.62% from two or more races. Hispanic or Latino of any race were 1.62% of the population.

There were 92 households, out of which 39.1% had children under the age of 18 living with them, 53.3% were married couples living together, 7.6% had a female householder with no husband present, and 31.5% were non-families. 26.1% of all households were made up of individuals, and 9.8% had someone living alone who was 65 years of age or older. The average household size was 2.68 and the average family size was 3.29.

In the city, the population was spread out, with 33.2% under the age of 18, 6.5% from 18 to 24, 34.4% from 25 to 44, 16.6% from 45 to 64, and 9.3% who were 65 years of age or older. The median age was 32 years. For every 100 females, there were 96.0 males. For every 100 females age 18 and over, there were 108.9 males.

The median income for a household in the city was $25,000, and the median income for a family was $29,500. Males had a median income of $18,750 versus $25,536 for females. The per capita income for the city was $11,673. About 15.6% of families and 13.3% of the population were below the poverty line, including 14.4% of those under the age of eighteen and none of those 65 or over.

== Government ==
The Reading government consists of a mayor and five council members. The council meets the first Thursday of each month at 7PM.

- City Hall, 413 First Street.
- U.S. Post Office, 404 First Street.
- Kansas Department of Wildlife & Park, 2272 Road 250.

== Education ==
The community is served by North Lyon County USD 251 public school district, and its headquarters are located in Americus. The Northern Heights High School is located east of Allen, and its mascot is the Wildcats. The NLC Elementary School and NLC Early Learning Center (preschool) are located in Americus.

The city previously had a school located at 424 First Street. Reading High School was closed through school unification in 1980. The Reading High School mascot was "The Reading Lions". The Reading Elementary School closed at the end of the 2017-2018 academic year. As of March 21, 2019 the school district had not made a decision as to the disposition of the school building in Reading.

== Notable people ==
- Jim Barnett, unsuccessful 2006 Republican candidate for governor of Kansas, grew up on a farm near Reading and graduated from Reading High School.
- Robert D. "Bob" Price (1927–2004), U.S. Representative from the Texas Panhandle from 1967 to 1975, was born in Reading.

== See also ==
- Tornado outbreak sequence of May 21–26, 2011
