= Neosho Rapids, Kansas =

City in Lyon County, Kansas, USA

- City
- Location within Lyon County and Kansas

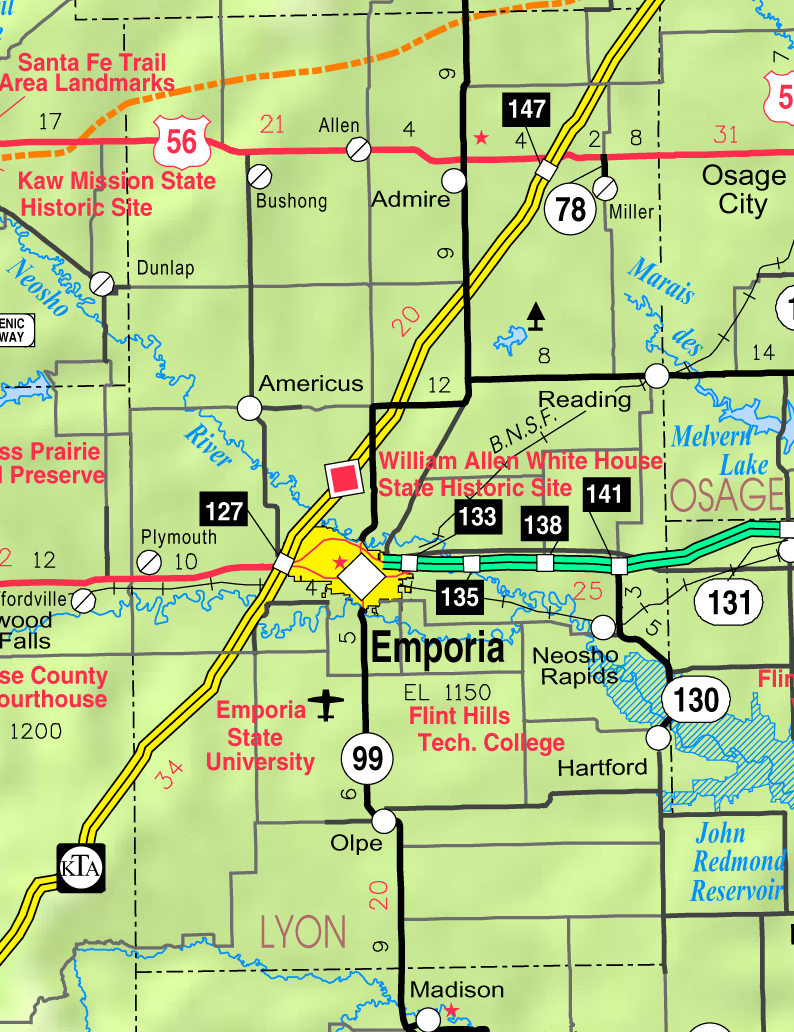
- KDOT map of Lyon County (legend)
- Coordinates: 38°22′07″N 95°59′29″W
- Country: United States
- State: Kansas
- County: Lyon
- Platted: 1855
- Incorporated: 1923
- Named for: Rapids on Neosho River

Government
  - Type: Mayor–Council

Area
  - Total: 0.51 sq mi (1.32 km^{2})
  - Land: 0.51 sq mi (1.31 km^{2})
  - Water: 0.0077 sq mi (0.02 km^{2})
- Elevation: 1,093 ft (333 m)

Population (2020)
  - Total: 229
  - Density: 453/sq mi (175/km^{2})
- Time zone: UTC-6 (CST)
  - Summer (DST): UTC-5 (CDT)
- ZIP Code: 66864
- Area code: 620
- FIPS code: 20-49875
- GNIS ID: 2395174

Neosho Rapids is a city in Lyon County, Kansas, United States. As of the 2020 census, the population of the city was 229.

== History ==
Neosho Rapids was previously called Italia, then Florence, and was laid out in 1855. It was named Neosho Rapids in 1857 from the whitewater on the Neosho River.

LIFE magazine did a five-page feature article in the December 24, 1945, issue of servicemen coming home to the town for their first Christmas after WWII.

== Geography ==
According to the United States Census Bureau, the city has a total area of 0.51 square miles (1.32 km^{2}), of which 0.50 square miles (1.29 km^{2}) is land and 0.01 square miles (0.03 km^{2}) is water.

=== Climate ===
The climate in this area is characterized by hot, humid summers and generally mild to cool winters. According to the Köppen Climate Classification system, Neosho Rapids has a humid subtropical climate, abbreviated "Cfa" on climate maps.

== Demographics ==
Historical population
Census	Pop.	Note	%±
1880	80		—
1890	308		285.0%
1910	256		—
1920	267		4.3%
1930	306		14.6%
1940	253		−17.3%
1950	204		−19.4%
1960	178		−12.7%
1970	234		31.5%
1980	289		23.5%
1990	235		−18.7%
2000	274		16.6%
2010	265		−3.3%
2020	229		−13.6%
U.S. Decennial Census

Neosho Rapids is part of the Emporia Micropolitan Statistical Area.

=== 2020 census ===
The 2020 United States census counted 229 people, 91 households, and 53 families in Neosho Rapids. The population density was 453.5 per square mile (175.1/km^{2}). There were 115 housing units at an average density of 227.7 per square mile (87.9/km^{2}). The racial makeup was 94.76% (217) white or European American (92.58% non-Hispanic white), 0.0% (0) black or African-American, 0.87% (2) Native American or Alaska Native, 0.0% (0) Asian, 0.0% (0) Pacific Islander or Native Hawaiian, 0.0% (0) from other races, and 4.37% (10) from two or more races. Hispanic or Latino of any race was 3.49% (8) of the population.

Of the 91 households, 25.3% had children under the age of 18; 51.6% were married couples living together; 18.7% had a female householder with no spouse or partner present. 38.5% of households consisted of individuals and 18.7% had someone living alone who was 65 years of age or older. The average household size was 3.5 and the average family size was 4.7. The percent of those with a bachelor's degree or higher was estimated to be 15.3% of the population.

23.1% of the population was under the age of 18, 6.1% from 18 to 24, 25.3% from 25 to 44, 27.1% from 45 to 64, and 18.3% who were 65 years of age or older. The median age was 41.1 years. For every 100 females, there were 89.3 males. For every 100 females ages 18 and older, there were 83.3 males.

The 2016–2020 5-year American Community Survey estimates show that the median household income was $53,750 (with a margin of error of +/- $22,644) and the median family income was $71,750 (+/- $14,266). Males had a median income of $37,500 (+/- $8,079) versus $20,417 (+/- $13,000) for females. The median income for those above 16 years old was $31,719 (+/- $6,836). Approximately, 13.1% of families and 8.0% of the population were below the poverty line, including 7.8% of those under the age of 18 and 9.4% of those ages 65 or over.

=== 2010 census ===
As of the census of 2010, there were 265 people, 105 households, and 67 families residing in the city. The population density was 530.0 inhabitants per square mile (204.6/km^{2}). There were 119 housing units at an average density of 238.0 per square mile (91.9/km^{2}). The racial makeup of the city was 98.1% White and 1.9% from two or more races. Hispanic or Latino of any race were 3.4% of the population.

There were 105 households, of which 33.3% had children under the age of 18 living with them, 50.5% were married couples living together, 7.6% had a female householder with no husband present, 5.7% had a male householder with no wife present, and 36.2% were non-families. 29.5% of all households were made up of individuals, and 16.2% had someone living alone who was 65 years of age or older. The average household size was 2.48 and the average family size was 3.03.

The median age in the city was 38.5 years. 25.3% of residents were under the age of 18; 7.5% were between the ages of 18 and 24; 24.1% were from 25 to 44; 27.1% were from 45 to 64; and 15.8% were 65 years of age or older. The gender makeup of the city was 49.1% male and 50.9% female.

=== 2000 census ===
As of the census of 2000, there were 274 people, 104 households, and 79 families residing in the city. The population density was 561.9 inhabitants per square mile (217.0/km^{2}). There were 115 housing units at an average density of 235.9 per square mile (91.1/km^{2}). The racial makeup of the city was 96.35% White, 1.82% African American, 0.36% from other races, and 1.46% from two or more races. Hispanic or Latino of any race were 2.19% of the population.

There were 104 households, out of which 35.6% had children under the age of 18 living with them, 64.4% were married couples living together, 4.8% had a female householder with no husband present, and 24.0% were non-families. 20.2% of all households were made up of individuals, and 7.7% had someone living alone who was 65 years of age or older. The average household size was 2.53 and the average family size was 2.90.

In the city, the population was spread out, with 26.3% under the age of 18, 4.4% from 18 to 24, 31.8% from 25 to 44, 23.4% from 45 to 64, and 14.2% who were 65 years of age or older. The median age was 39 years. For every 100 females, there were 112.4 males. For every 100 females age 18 and over, there were 100.0 males.

The median income for a household in the city was $29,423, and the median income for a family was $35,250. Males had a median income of $28,750 versus $20,000 for females. The per capita income for the city was $13,239. About 6.2% of families and 10.8% of the population were below the poverty line, including 2.8% of those under the age of eighteen and 36.9% of those 65 or over.

== Education ==
The community is served by Southern Lyon County USD 252 public school district.

== See also ==
- Great Flood of 1951
