= Tonovay, Kansas =

Unincorporated community in Greenwood County, Kansas

- Unincorporated community
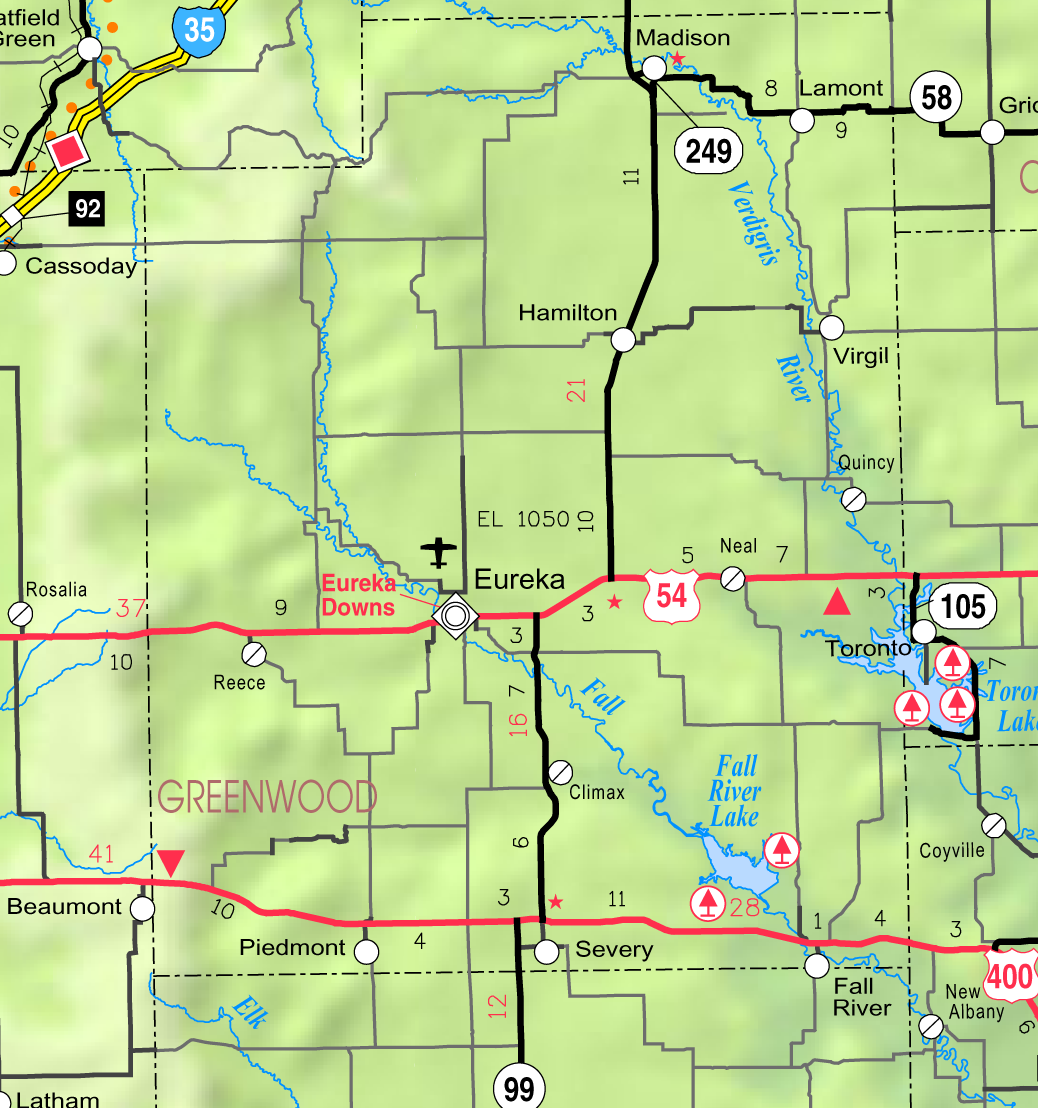
- KDOT map of Greenwood County (legend)

- Location within Kansas Location within the United States
- Coordinates: 37°51′8″N 96°10′41″W
- Country: United States
- State: Kansas
- County: Greenwood
- Elevation: 1,050 ft (320 m)
- Time zone: UTC-6 (CST)
  - Summer (DST): UTC-5 (CDT)
- Area code: 620
- FIPS code: 20-70850
- GNIS ID: 474649

Tonovay (also Ton of Hay) is an unincorporated community in Greenwood County, Kansas, United States. It is located approximately five miles east of the city of Eureka along K-99 highway.

== Education ==
The community is served by Eureka USD 389 public school district.
