= North Lyon County USD 251 =

Public school district in Americus, Kansas

Address
- 614 Main St. Americus, Kansas, 66835; United States
- Coordinates: 38°30.3893′N 96°15.7538′W

District information
- Type: Public
- Grades: K to 12
- Superintendent: Robert Blair
- School board: 7 members
- Schools: 3

Other information
- Website: usd251.org

North Lyon County USD 251 is a public unified school district headquartered in Americus, Kansas, United States. The district includes the communities of Americus, Admire, Allen, Bushong, Miller, Reading, and nearby rural areas. The district extends into Wabaunsee County.

== History ==
North Lyon County is the unified school district for the Northern part of Lyon County. North Lyon County USD 251 formed in 1958, when Admire, Allen, Bushong, and Miller consolidated. Those schools were turned into elementary schools. In 1973, Americus High School joined the district, moving the high school to Northern Heights, and changing its name to North Lyon County Junior High School. In 1981, Reading High School joined USD 251, changing the school's name to Reading Elementary School.

== Current schools ==
The school district operates the following schools:

- Northern Heights High School (NHHS) is located at 1208 Highway 56, east of Allen.
- Americus Elementary School is located at 804 Sixth Street in Americus.
- NLC Early Learning Center (preschool) is located at 558 Broadway Street in Americus.

== Former Schools ==
- Admire Elementary / High School
- Reading Elementary / High School

== See also ==
- List of high schools in Kansas
- List of unified school districts in Kansas
- Kansas State Department of Education
- Kansas State High School Activities Association
