= Madison Township, Greenwood County, Kansas =

Madison Township
- Township
- Location in Greenwood County
- Coordinates: 38°06′55″N 096°12′46″W
- Country: United States
- State: Kansas
- County: Greenwood

Area
  - Total: 124.68 sq mi (322.91 km^{2})
  - Land: 123.62 sq mi (320.17 km^{2})
  - Water: 1.06 sq mi (2.74 km^{2}) 0.85%
- Elevation: 1,250 ft (380 m)

Population (2020)
  - Total: 1,007
  - Density: 8.146/sq mi (3.145/km^{2})
- GNIS feature ID: 0477834

Madison Township is a township in Greenwood County, Kansas, United States. As of the 2020 census, its population was 1,007.

== Geography ==
Madison Township covers an area of 124.68 square miles (322.9 km^{2}) and contains one incorporated settlement, Madison. According to the USGS, it contains three cemeteries: Andrew, Blakely and Woods.

The streams of Bernard Branch, Holderman Creek, Kelly Branch, Moon Branch, North Branch Verdigris River, Rock Creek, South Branch Verdigris River and Tate Branch Creek run through this township.

== Transportation ==
Madison Township contains one airport or landing strip, Godfrey Airport.
