= Lincoln Township, Coffey County, Kansas =

Lincoln Township
- Township
- Location in Coffey County
- Coordinates: 38°23′25″N 095°53′41″W
- Country: United States
- State: Kansas
- County: Coffey

Area
  - Total: 71.1 sq mi (184.2 km^{2})
  - Land: 69.98 sq mi (181.25 km^{2})
  - Water: 1.14 sq mi (2.95 km^{2}) 1.6%
- Elevation: 1,142 ft (348 m)

Population (2020)
  - Total: 1,227
  - Density: 17.53/sq mi (6.770/km^{2})
- GNIS feature ID: 0477551

Lincoln Township is a township in Coffey County, Kansas, United States. As of the 2020 census, its population was 1,227.

== Geography ==
Lincoln Township covers an area of 71.12 square miles (184.2 km^{2}) and contains one incorporated settlement, Lebo. According to the USGS, it has one cemetery, Lincoln.

The township is traversed by several streams, including Benedict Creek, Jordan Creek, Kennedy Creek, Lebo Creek, Logwater Branch and Troublesome Creek.
