= Americus, Kansas =

City in Lyon County, Kansas

- City
- Location within Lyon County and Kansas

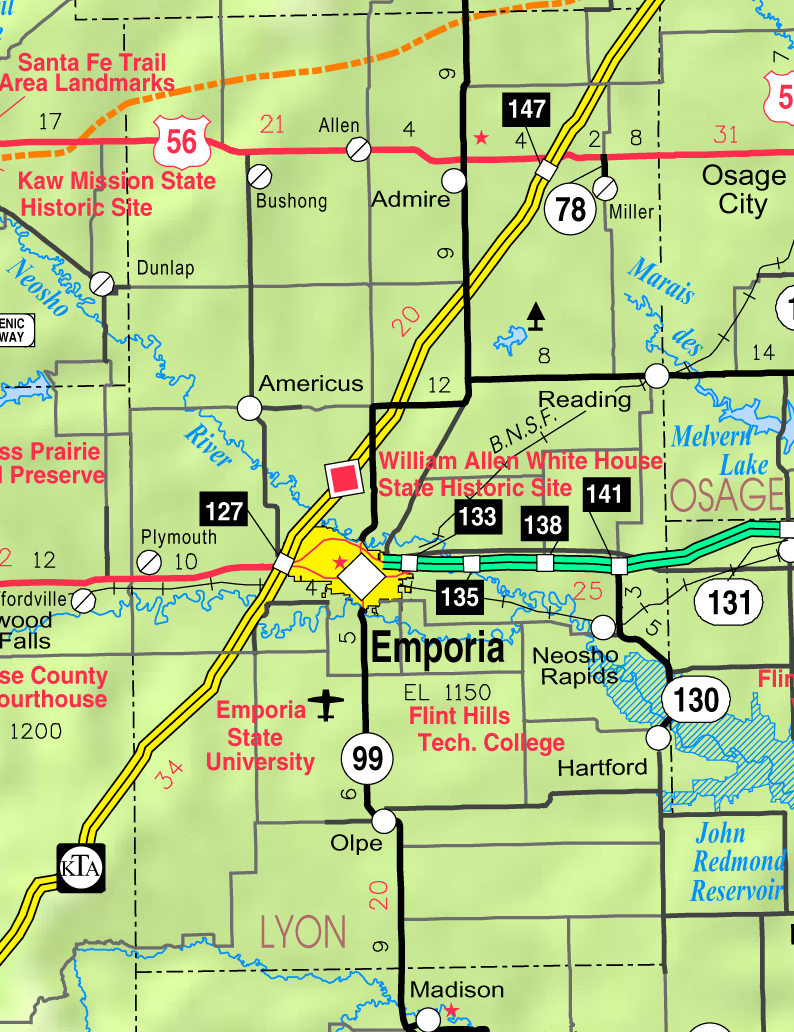
- KDOT map of Lyon County (legend)
- Coordinates: 38°30′23″N 96°15′35″W
- Country: United States
- State: Kansas
- County: Lyon
- Platted: 1857
- Incorporated: 1884
- Named for: Amerigo Vespucci

Government
  - Type: Mayor–Council

Area
  - Total: 1.10 sq mi (2.84 km^{2})
  - Land: 1.08 sq mi (2.80 km^{2})
  - Water: 0.012 sq mi (0.03 km^{2})
- Elevation: 1,158 ft (353 m)

Population (2020)
  - Total: 776
  - Density: 718/sq mi (277/km^{2})
- Time zone: UTC-6 (CST)
  - Summer (DST): UTC-5 (CDT)
- ZIP Code: 66835
- Area code: 620
- FIPS code: 20-01675
- GNIS ID: 2393946
- Website: City website

Americus is a city in Lyon County, Kansas, United States. As of the 2020 census, the population of the city was 776. It is located northwest of the city of Emporia. Americus is often a waypoint in some Unbound Gravel bike races.

== History ==
Americus was laid out in the fall of 1857. It was named for Amerigo Vespucci.

Americus was a station and shipping point on the Missouri–Kansas–Texas Railroad.

== Geography ==
According to the United States Census Bureau, the city has a total area of 1.13 square miles (2.93 km^{2}), of which 1.12 square miles (2.90 km^{2}) is land and 0.01 square miles (0.03 km^{2}) is water.

== Demographics ==
Historical population
Census	Pop.	Note	%±
1880	431		—
1890	393		−8.8%
1900	332		−15.5%
1910	451		35.8%
1920	493		9.3%
1930	430		−12.8%
1940	406		−5.6%
1950	339		−16.5%
1960	300		−11.5%
1970	441		47.0%
1980	915		107.5%
1990	891		−2.6%
2000	938		5.3%
2010	894		−4.7%
2020	776		−13.2%
U.S. Decennial Census

Americus is part of the Emporia Micropolitan Statistical Area.

=== 2020 census ===
The 2020 United States census counted 776 people, 324 households, and 216 families in Americus. The population density was 716.5 per square mile (276.7/km^{2}). There were 357 housing units at an average density of 329.6 per square mile (127.3/km^{2}). The racial makeup was 92.01% (714) white or European American (89.43% non-Hispanic white), 0.13% (1) black or African-American, 0.13% (1) Native American or Alaska Native, 0.0% (0) Asian, 0.0% (0) Pacific Islander or Native Hawaiian, 0.64% (5) from other races, and 7.09% (55) from two or more races. Hispanic or Latino of any race was 5.03% (39) of the population.

Of the 324 households, 32.1% had children under the age of 18; 50.6% were married couples living together; 25.3% had a female householder with no spouse or partner present. 29.9% of households consisted of individuals and 15.4% had someone living alone who was 65 years of age or older. The average household size was 2.5 and the average family size was 3.1. The percent of those with a bachelor's degree or higher was estimated to be 15.7% of the population.

24.6% of the population was under the age of 18, 6.1% from 18 to 24, 23.3% from 25 to 44, 27.3% from 45 to 64, and 18.7% who were 65 years of age or older. The median age was 39.9 years. For every 100 females, there were 110.3 males. For every 100 females ages 18 and older, there were 106.0 males.

The 2016–2020 5-year American Community Survey estimates show that the median household income was $65,156 (with a margin of error of +/- $12,343) and the median family income was $77,721 (+/- $12,096). Males had a median income of $39,336 (+/- $3,356) versus $27,083 (+/- $5,767) for females. The median income for those above 16 years old was $33,859 (+/- $5,543). Approximately, 5.2% of families and 9.9% of the population were below the poverty line, including 14.9% of those under the age of 18 and 4.0% of those ages 65 or over.

=== 2010 census ===
As of the census of 2010, there were 894 people, 354 households, and 251 families residing in the city. The population density was 798.2 inhabitants per square mile (308.2/km^{2}). There were 386 housing units at an average density of 344.6 per square mile (133.1/km^{2}). The racial makeup of the city was 96.2% White, 0.2% Native American, 0.1% Asian, 0.6% from other races, and 2.9% from two or more races. Hispanic or Latino of any race were 4.1% of the population.

There were 354 households, of which 36.4% had children under the age of 18 living with them, 54.0% were married couples living together, 11.0% had a female householder with no husband present, 5.9% had a male householder with no wife present, and 29.1% were non-families. 24.0% of all households were made up of individuals, and 9.6% had someone living alone who was 65 years of age or older. The average household size was 2.53 and the average family size was 2.96.

The median age in the city was 38 years. 27.4% of residents were under the age of 18; 8.3% were between the ages of 18 and 24; 23.8% were from 25 to 44; 28.4% were from 45 to 64; and 12.2% were 65 years of age or older. The gender makeup of the city was 47.9% male and 52.1% female.

=== 2000 census ===
As of the census of 2000, there were 938 people, 355 households, and 259 families residing in the city. The population density was 870.1 inhabitants per square mile (335.9/km^{2}). There were 383 housing units at an average density of 355.3 per square mile (137.2/km^{2}). The racial makeup of the city was 96.80% White, 0.32% African American, 0.43% Native American, 0.11% Asian, 1.07% from other races, and 1.28% from two or more races. Hispanic or Latino of any race were 1.71% of the population.

There were 355 households, out of which 39.2% had children under the age of 18 living with them, 58.9% were married couples living together, 10.4% had a female householder with no husband present, and 27.0% were non-families. 23.1% of all households were made up of individuals, and 10.1% had someone living alone who was 65 years of age or older. The average household size was 2.64 and the average family size was 3.12.

In the city, the population was spread out, with 29.9% under the age of 18, 8.6% from 18 to 24, 28.8% from 25 to 44, 22.8% from 45 to 64, and 9.9% who were 65 years of age or older. The median age was 35 years. For every 100 females, there were 93.0 males. For every 100 females age 18 and over, there were 94.7 males.

The median income for a household in the city was $35,859, and the median income for a family was $43,850. Males had a median income of $29,545 versus $21,705 for females. The per capita income for the city was $14,532. About 9.9% of families and 11.4% of the population were below the poverty line, including 15.0% of those under age 18 and 11.1% of those age 65 or over.

== Education ==
The community is served by North Lyon County USD 251 public school district, and its headquarters are located in Americus. The Northern Heights High School is located east of Allen, and its mascot is the Wildcats. The NLC Elementary School and NLC Early Learning Center (preschool) are located in Americus.

Americus High School closed after school district unification. The Americus Indians achieved a record of 26–0 to win the Kansas State High School boys Class B basketball championship in 1961.

== Transportation ==
The closest Kansas Turnpike exit is located approximately 6 miles (9.7 km) south of Americus along U.S. Route 50 in Emporia.

== Notable people ==
- Ross Grimsley (1922–1994), Major League Baseball pitcher in the 1950s
- Chuck Norris (1925–2009), member of the Oregon House of Representatives, military officer, businessman
- Grant Timmerman (1919–1944), U.S. Marine posthumously awarded the Medal of Honor during World War II
