= Northern Heights High School =

Location
- 1208 Road 345; Allen, Kansas 66833; United States; 38°39.5284′N 96°10.1981′W

Information
- School type: Public, High School
- Established: 1958
- School board: BOE website
- School district: North Lyon County USD 251
- Superintendent: Mike Mathes
- Principal: Peggy Fort
- Teaching staff: 14.75 (FTE)
- Grades: 9 - 12
- Gender: coed
- Enrollment: 105 (2023-2024)
- Student to teacher ratio: 7.12
- Colors: Black; White
- Slogan: The Best Students in the World are Learning Here!
- Athletics: KSHSAA
- Athletics conference: Flint Hills League
- Sports: Yes
- Mascot: Wildcats
- Nickname: Northern Heights Wildcats
- Website: NHHS

Northern Heights High School is a fully accredited public high school located in Allen, Kansas, in the North Lyon County USD 251 school district, serving students in grades 9-12. The school mascot is the Wildcats and the school colors are black and white.

== Extracurricular activities ==
The Wildcats compete in the Flint Hills League. Northern Heights is in the KSHSAA classification 2A.

=== Athletics ===
The Wildcats compete in the Flint Hills League and are classified as a 1A school.
Northern Heights High School offers the following sports:

==== Fall ====
- Boys' Cross Country
- Girls' Cross Country
- Fall Cheerleading
- Football
- Volleyball

==== Winter ====
- Boys' Basketball
- Girls' Basketball
- Winter Cheerleading

==== Spring ====
- Baseball
- Golf
- Softball
- Boys' Track and Field
- Girls' Track and Field
