= Toledo Township, Kansas =

Toledo Township
- Township
- Location within Chase County

- Location within the state of Kansas
- Coordinates: 38°27′00″N 096°24′31″W
- Country: United States
- State: Kansas
- County: Chase

Area
  - Total: 90.21 sq mi (233.64 km^{2})
  - Land: 89.81 sq mi (232.61 km^{2})
  - Water: 0.40 sq mi (1.03 km^{2}) 0.44%
- Elevation: 1,198 ft (365 m)

Population (2020)
  - Total: 292
  - Density: 3.1/sq mi (1.2/km^{2})
- GNIS feature ID: 0477171

Toledo Township is a township in Chase County, Kansas, United States. As of the 2020 census, its population was 292.

== Geography ==
Toledo Township covers an area of 90.21 square miles (233.6 km^{2}). The streams of Bloody Creek, Buckeye Creek, Bull Creek, East Buckeye Creek, Little Bloody Creek, Peyton Creek and Spring Creek run through this township.

== Communities ==
The township contains the following settlements:

- Unincorporated community of Saffordville.
- Unincorporated community of Toledo.

== Cemeteries ==
The township contains the following cemeteries:

- Hillside.
