= Allen, Kansas =

City in Lyon County, Kansas

- City
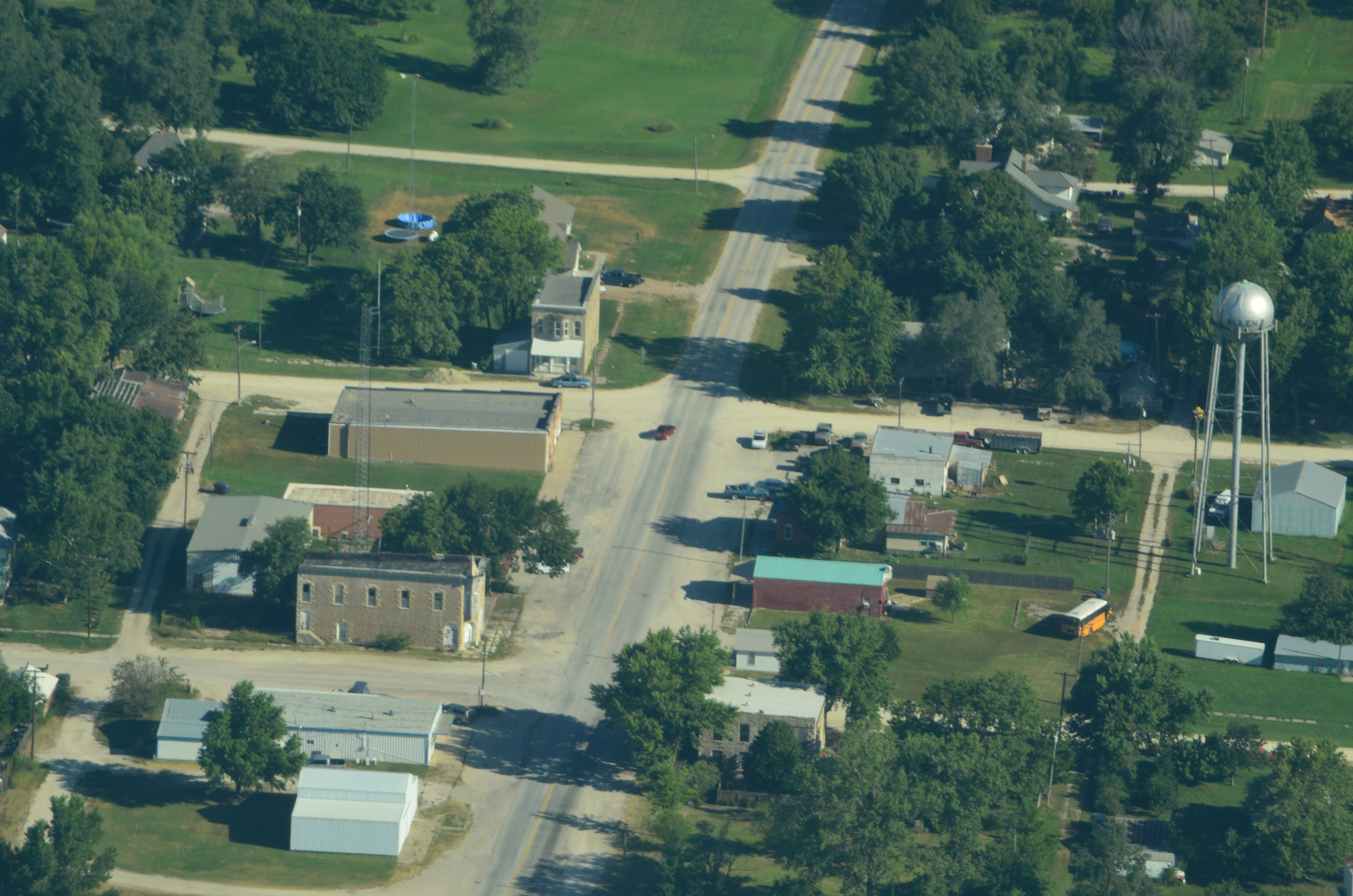
- Aerial view of Allen (2013)

- Location within Lyon County and Kansas

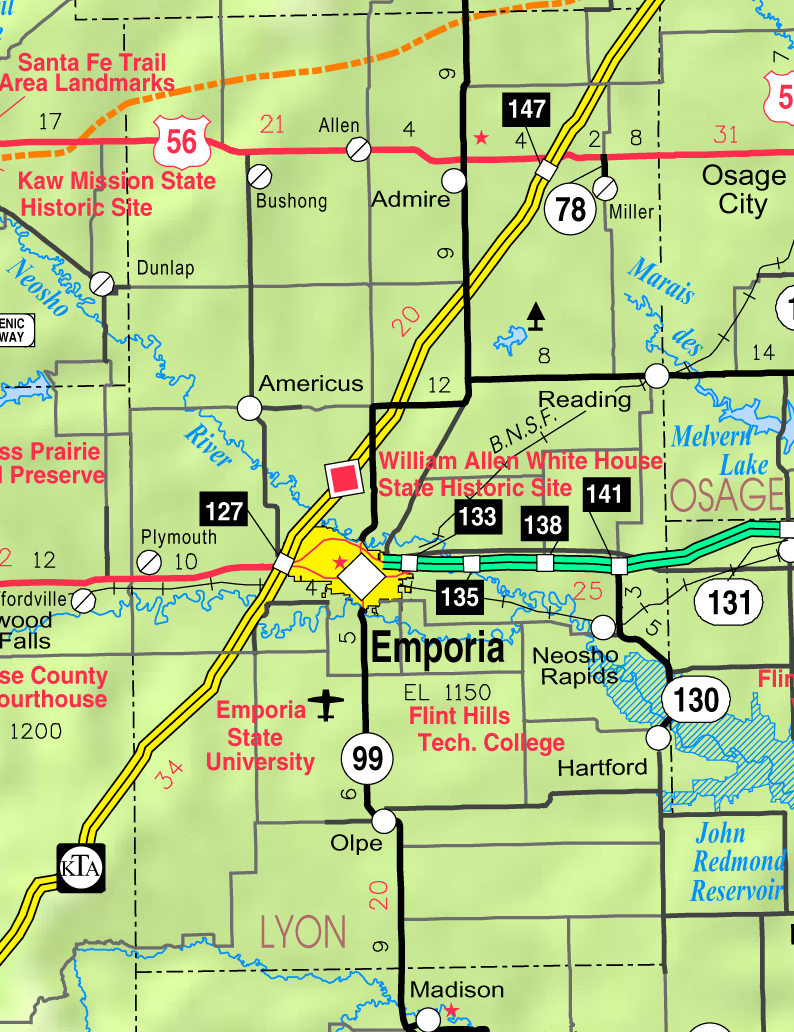
- KDOT map of Lyon County (legend)
- Coordinates: 38°39′18″N 96°10′11″W
- Country: United States
- State: Kansas
- County: Lyon
- Founded: 1854
- Incorporated: 1909

Government
  - Type: Mayor–Council

Area
  - Total: 0.28 sq mi (0.72 km^{2})
  - Land: 0.28 sq mi (0.72 km^{2})
  - Water: 0 sq mi (0.00 km^{2})
- Elevation: 1,326 ft (404 m)

Population (2020)
  - Total: 160
  - Density: 580/sq mi (220/km^{2})
- Time zone: UTC-6 (CST)
  - Summer (DST): UTC-5 (CDT)
- ZIP Code: 66833
- Area code: 620
- FIPS code: 20-01275
- GNIS ID: 2393921

Allen is a city in Lyon County, Kansas, United States. As of the 2020 census, the population of the city was 160.

== History ==
Allen was founded in 1854. It was incorporated as a city in 1909.

Allen was a station on the Missouri Pacific Railroad.

== Geography ==
According to the United States Census Bureau, the city has a total area of 0.27 square miles (0.70 km^{2}), all land.

=== Climate ===
The climate in this area is characterized by hot, humid summers and generally mild to cool winters. According to the Köppen Climate Classification system, Allen has a humid subtropical climate, abbreviated "Cfa" on climate maps.

== Demographics ==
Historical population
Census	Pop.	Note	%±
1910	286		—
1920	295		3.1%
1930	343		16.3%
1940	279		−18.7%
1950	241		−13.6%
1960	205		−14.9%
1970	175		−14.6%
1980	205		17.1%
1990	191		−6.8%
2000	211		10.5%
2010	177		−16.1%
2020	160		−9.6%
U.S. Decennial Census

Allen is part of the Emporia Micropolitan Statistical Area.

=== 2020 census ===
The 2020 United States census counted 160 people, 77 households, and 44 families in Allen. The population density was 579.7 per square mile (223.8/km^{2}). There were 90 housing units at an average density of 326.1 per square mile (125.9/km^{2}). The racial makeup was 87.5% (140) white or European American (86.88% non-Hispanic white), 0.0% (0) black or African-American, 0.0% (0) Native American or Alaska Native, 1.88% (3) Asian, 0.0% (0) Pacific Islander or Native Hawaiian, 4.38% (7) from other races, and 6.25% (10) from two or more races. Hispanic or Latino of any race was 5.62% (9) of the population.

Of the 77 households, 29.9% had children under the age of 18; 37.7% were married couples living together; 22.1% had a female householder with no spouse or partner present. 35.1% of households consisted of individuals and 23.4% had someone living alone who was 65 years of age or older. The average household size was 2.2 and the average family size was 3.5. The percent of those with a bachelor's degree or higher was estimated to be 6.2% of the population.

18.8% of the population was under the age of 18, 13.1% from 18 to 24, 19.4% from 25 to 44, 25.0% from 45 to 64, and 23.8% who were 65 years of age or older. The median age was 43.0 years. For every 100 females, there were 102.5 males. For every 100 females ages 18 and older, there were 97.0 males.

The 2016–2020 5-year American Community Survey estimates show that the median household income was $37,917 (with a margin of error of +/- $8,495) and the median family income was $38,125 (+/- $18,106). The median income for those above 16 years old was $30,469 (+/- $13,317). Approximately, 31.0% of families and 23.6% of the population were below the poverty line, including 36.8% of those under the age of 18 and 9.7% of those ages 65 or over.

=== 2010 census ===
As of the census of 2010, there were 177 people, 77 households, and 46 families residing in the city. The population density was 655.6 inhabitants per square mile (253.1/km^{2}). There were 91 housing units at an average density of 337.0 per square mile (130.1/km^{2}). The racial makeup of the city was 96.0% White, 2.3% from other races, and 1.7% from two or more races. Hispanic or Latino of any race were 4.0% of the population.

There were 77 households, of which 28.6% had children under the age of 18 living with them, 49.4% were married couples living together, 7.8% had a female householder with no husband present, 2.6% had a male householder with no wife present, and 40.3% were non-families. 36.4% of all households were made up of individuals, and 13% had someone living alone who was 65 years of age or older. The average household size was 2.30 and the average family size was 3.07.

The median age in the city was 42.4 years. 26% of residents were under the age of 18; 3.8% were between the ages of 18 and 24; 23.7% were from 25 to 44; 28.7% were from 45 to 64; and 17.5% were 65 years of age or older. The gender makeup of the city was 53.1% male and 46.9% female.

=== 2000 census ===
As of the census of 2000, there were 211 people, 83 households, and 62 families residing in the city. The population density was 768.7 inhabitants per square mile (296.8/km^{2}). There were 93 housing units at an average density of 338.8 per square mile (130.8/km^{2}). The racial makeup of the city was 98.10% White, 0.47% African American and 1.42% Native American. Hispanic or Latino of any race were 0.95% of the population.

There were 83 households, out of which 39.8% had children under the age of 18 living with them, 59.0% were married couples living together, 12.0% had a female householder with no husband present, and 25.3% were non-families. 24.1% of all households were made up of individuals, and 14.5% had someone living alone who was 65 years of age or older. The average household size was 2.54 and the average family size was 3.00.

In the city, the population was spread out, with 29.9% under the age of 18, 6.6% from 18 to 24, 28.4% from 25 to 44, 20.9% from 45 to 64, and 14.2% who were 65 years of age or older. The median age was 36 years. For every 100 females, there were 113.1 males. For every 100 females age 18 and over, there were 102.7 males.

The median income for a household in the city was $32,500, and the median income for a family was $39,792. Males had a median income of $30,000 versus $24,500 for females. The per capita income for the city was $15,855. About 10.2% of families and 8.0% of the population were below the poverty line, including 18.9% of those under the age of eighteen and none of those 65 or over.

== Education ==
The community is served by North Lyon County USD 251 public school district, and its headquarters are located in Americus. The Northern Heights High School is located east of Allen, and its mascot is the Wildcats. The NLC Elementary School and NLC Early Learning Center (preschool) are located in Americus.

== Transportation ==
U.S. Route 56 passes along the northern edge of Allen. The closest Kansas Turnpike exit is located approximately 7.5 miles (12.1 km) east of Admire along U.S. Route 56.
