= Lyon County, Kansas =

County in Kansas, United States

- County
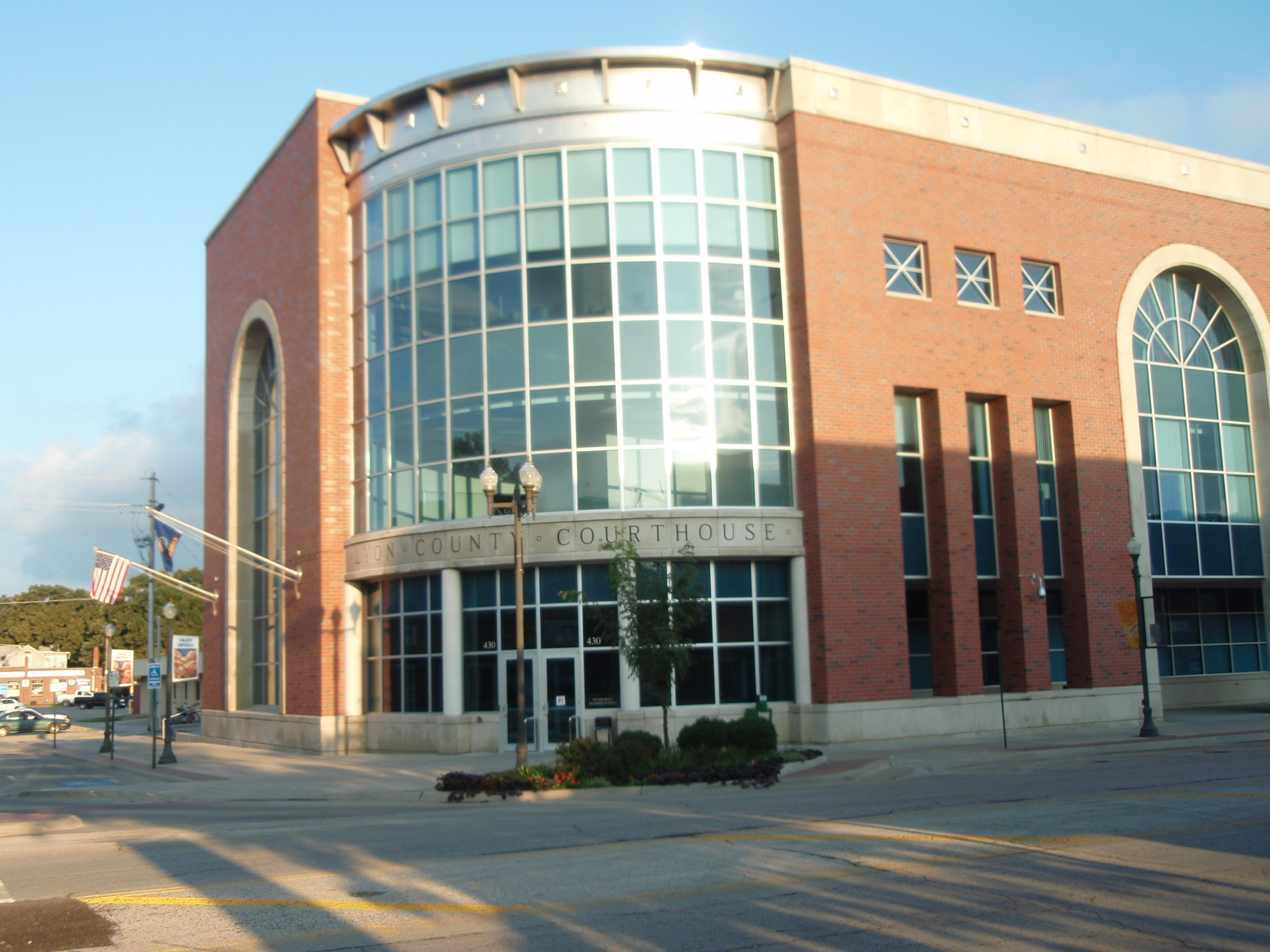
- Lyon County Courthouse in Emporia (2009)

- Location within the U.S. state of Kansas
- Country: United States
- State: Kansas
- Founded: February 5, 1862
- Named for: Nathaniel Lyon
- Seat: Emporia
- Largest city: Emporia

Area
  - Total: 855 sq mi (2,210 km^{2})
  - Land: 847 sq mi (2,190 km^{2})
  - Water: 7.9 sq mi (20 km^{2}) 0.9%

Population (2020)
  - Total: 32,179
  - Estimate (2025): 32,266 ▲
  - Density: 38/sq mi (15/km^{2})
- Time zone: UTC−6 (Central)
  - Summer (DST): UTC−5 (CDT)
- Congressional district: 2nd
- Website: lyoncountyks.gov

Lyon County is a county located in the U.S. state of Kansas. Its county seat and largest city is Emporia. As of the 2020 census, the county population was 32,179. The county was named for Nathaniel Lyon, a general who was killed at the Battle of Wilson's Creek during the Civil War.

== History ==
=== Early history ===
For many millennia, the Great Plains of North America was inhabited by nomadic Native Americans. From the 16th century to 18th century, the Kingdom of France claimed ownership of large parts of North America. In 1762, after the French and Indian War, France secretly ceded New France to Spain, per the Treaty of Fontainebleau.

=== 19th century ===
In 1802, Spain returned most of the land to France, but keeping title to about 7,500 square miles. In 1803, most of the land for modern day Kansas was acquired by the United States from France as part of the 828,000 square mile Louisiana Purchase for 2.83 cents per acre.

In 1806, Zebulon Pike led the Pike Expedition westward from St Louis, Missouri, of which part of their journey followed the Cottonwood River through Lyon County.

In 1854, the Kansas Territory was organized, then in 1861 Kansas became the 34th U.S. state. In 1862, Lyon County was established from the county formerly known as Breckinridge County.

In 1871, the Atchison, Topeka and Santa Fe Railway extended a main line from Emporia to Newton.

== Geography ==
According to the U.S. Census Bureau, the county has a total area of 855 square miles (2,210 km^{2}), of which 847 square miles (2,190 km^{2}) is land and 7.9 square miles (20 km^{2}) (0.9%) is water.

=== Adjacent counties ===
- Wabaunsee County (north)
- Osage County (northeast)
- Coffey County (southeast)
- Greenwood County (south)
- Chase County (west)
- Morris County (northwest)

=== National protected area ===
- Flint Hills National Wildlife Refuge (part)

== Demographics ==
Historical population
Census	Pop.	Note	%±
1870	8,014		—
1880	17,326		116.2%
1890	23,196		33.9%
1900	25,074		8.1%
1910	24,927		−0.6%
1920	26,154		4.9%
1930	29,240		11.8%
1940	26,424		−9.6%
1950	26,576		0.6%
1960	26,928		1.3%
1970	32,071		19.1%
1980	35,108		9.5%
1990	34,732		−1.1%
2000	35,935		3.5%
2010	33,690		−6.2%
2020	32,179		−4.5%
2025 (est.)	32,266	▲	0.3%
U.S. Decennial Census; 1790-1960 1900-1990; 1990-2000 2010-2020

Lyon County comprises the Emporia, KS Micropolitan Statistical Area.

=== Racial and ethnic composition ===
Lyon County, Kansas – Racial and ethnic composition Note: the US Census treats Hispanic/Latino as an ethnic category. This table excludes Latinos from the racial categories and assigns them to a separate category. Hispanics/Latinos may be of any race.
Race / Ethnicity (NH = Non-Hispanic)	Pop 1980	Pop 1990	Pop 2000	Pop 2010	Pop 2020	% 1980	% 1990	% 2000	% 2010	% 2020
White alone (NH)	32,289	31,067	27,786	24,704	22,219	91.97%	89.45%	77.32%	73.33%	69.05%
Black or African American alone (NH)	745	706	785	731	599	2.12%	2.03%	2.18%	2.17%	1.86%
Native American or Alaska Native alone (NH)	174	181	142	144	122	0.50%	0.52%	0.40%	0.43%	0.38%
Asian alone (NH)	173	642	718	759	566	0.49%	1.85%	2.00%	2.25%	1.76%
Native Hawaiian or Pacific Islander alone (NH)	x	x	2	11	5	x	x	0.01%	0.03%	0.02%
Other race alone (NH)	160	22	24	25	225	0.46%	0.06%	0.07%	0.07%	0.70%
Mixed race or Multiracial (NH)	x	x	468	561	1,187	x	x	1.30%	1.67%	3.69%
Hispanic or Latino (any race)	1,567	2,114	6,010	6,755	7,256	4.46%	6.09%	16.72%	20.05%	22.55%
Total	35,108	34,732	35,935	33,690	32,179	100.00%	100.00%	100.00%	100.00%	100.00%

=== 2020 census ===
As of the 2020 census, the county had a population of 32,179 and a median age of 35.7 years. 22.0% of residents were under the age of 18 and 16.5% of residents were 65 years of age or older. For every 100 females there were 96.2 males, and for every 100 females age 18 and over there were 94.5 males age 18 and over. 74.8% of residents lived in urban areas, while 25.2% lived in rural areas.

The racial makeup of the county was 74.0% White, 2.0% Black or African American, 0.8% American Indian and Alaska Native, 1.8% Asian, 0.0% Native Hawaiian and Pacific Islander, 11.7% from some other race, and 9.6% from two or more races. Hispanic or Latino residents of any race comprised 22.5% of the population.

There were 13,183 households in the county, of which 28.0% had children under the age of 18 living with them and 26.6% had a female householder with no spouse or partner present. About 31.7% of all households were made up of individuals and 11.3% had someone living alone who was 65 years of age or older.

There were 14,957 housing units, of which 11.9% were vacant. Among occupied housing units, 61.3% were owner-occupied and 38.7% were renter-occupied. The homeowner vacancy rate was 1.7% and the rental vacancy rate was 12.0%.

=== 2000 census ===
As of the census of 2000, there were 35,935 people, 13,691 households, and 8,639 families residing in the county. The population density was 42 inhabitants per square mile (16/km^{2}). There were 14,757 housing units at an average density of 17 per square mile (6.6/km^{2}). The racial makeup of the county was 83.27% White, 2.27% Black or African American, 0.47% Native American, 2.04% Asian, 0.01% Pacific Islander, 9.79% from other races, and 2.16% from two or more races. 16.72% of the population were Hispanic or Latino of any race.

There were 13,691 households, out of which 32.60% had children under the age of 18 living with them, 50.80% were married couples living together, 8.40% had a female householder with no husband present, and 36.90% were non-families. 28.50% of all households were made up of individuals, and 9.80% had someone living alone who was 65 years of age or older. The average household size was 2.51 and the average family size was 3.12.

In the county, the population was spread out, with 25.70% under the age of 18, 16.20% from 18 to 24, 27.20% from 25 to 44, 19.10% from 45 to 64, and 11.60% who were 65 years of age or older. The median age was 31 years. For every 100 females, there were 97.40 males. For every 100 females age 18 and over, there were 95.20 males.

The median income for a household in the county was $32,819, and the median income for a family was $43,112. Males had a median income of $28,865 versus $21,338 for females. The per capita income for the county was $15,724. About 9.60% of families and 14.50% of the population were below the poverty line, including 15.60% of those under age 18 and 9.20% of those age 65 or over.

== Government ==
=== Presidential elections ===
Typical of Kansas, Lyon County has been strongly Republican for most of its history, although in recent times, the county isn’t as Republican as other rural counties in Kansas, owing to the presence of Emporia State University. In only seven presidential elections from 1880 to the present has the county failed to back the Republican candidate, the most recent being Lyndon B. Johnson in his national landslide of 1964. The Republican party did come close to losing the county in 1992 and 2008, however.

Presidential election results

United States presidential election results for Lyon County, Kansas
Year	Republican		Democratic		Third party(ies)	
Year	No.	%	No.	%	No.	%
1888	3,014	60.10%	1,377	27.46%	624	12.44%
1892	2,591	48.48%	0	0.00%	2,753	51.52%
1896	2,860	45.91%	3,276	52.59%	93	1.49%
1900	3,083	50.72%	2,865	47.13%	131	2.15%
1904	3,450	62.12%	1,461	26.31%	643	11.58%
1908	2,973	50.87%	2,562	43.84%	309	5.29%
1912	962	17.41%	2,363	42.77%	2,200	39.82%
1916	4,215	40.28%	5,584	53.36%	665	6.36%
1920	5,492	61.09%	3,303	36.74%	195	2.17%
1924	6,290	57.32%	2,750	25.06%	1,934	17.62%
1928	8,753	75.49%	2,761	23.81%	81	0.70%
1932	6,044	47.38%	6,365	49.90%	347	2.72%
1936	6,005	44.73%	7,340	54.67%	80	0.60%
1940	6,918	52.33%	6,170	46.68%	131	0.99%
1944	5,710	52.88%	4,984	46.15%	105	0.97%
1948	5,941	50.03%	5,708	48.06%	227	1.91%
1952	8,544	67.98%	3,944	31.38%	80	0.64%
1956	8,021	67.34%	3,831	32.16%	59	0.50%
1960	7,470	60.90%	4,755	38.77%	41	0.33%
1964	5,184	45.23%	6,197	54.07%	81	0.71%
1968	6,558	57.30%	4,020	35.12%	868	7.58%
1972	9,157	69.67%	3,720	28.30%	266	2.02%
1976	7,062	52.59%	5,634	41.96%	732	5.45%
1980	8,431	57.94%	4,680	32.16%	1,440	9.90%
1984	9,796	69.37%	4,188	29.66%	137	0.97%
1988	6,820	55.29%	5,314	43.08%	200	1.62%
1992	5,090	34.73%	4,811	32.83%	4,755	32.44%
1996	6,612	50.01%	4,884	36.94%	1,725	13.05%
2000	6,652	53.41%	5,190	41.67%	613	4.92%
2004	7,951	59.16%	5,234	38.94%	255	1.90%
2008	6,698	51.88%	5,924	45.88%	289	2.24%
2012	6,470	54.48%	5,111	43.04%	294	2.48%
2016	6,552	53.32%	4,649	37.83%	1,087	8.85%
2020	7,550	53.74%	6,055	43.10%	444	3.16%
2024	7,462	56.29%	5,515	41.60%	279	2.10%

=== Laws ===
Lyon County was a prohibition, or "dry", county until the Kansas Constitution was amended in 1986 and voters approved the sale of alcoholic liquor by the individual drink with a 30 percent food sales requirement. The food sales requirement was removed with voter approval in 1992.

The county voted "No" on the 2022 Kansas abortion referendum, an anti-abortion ballot measure, by 63% to 37% despite backing Donald Trump with 54% of the vote to Joe Biden's 43% in the 2020 presidential election.

== Education ==
=== Colleges and universities ===
- Emporia State University in Emporia
- Flint Hills Technical College in Emporia

=== Unified school districts ===
School districts include:

- North Lyon County USD 251
- Southern Lyon County USD 252
- Emporia USD 253

School districts with offices in neighboring counties

- Chase County USD 284
- Lebo-Waverly USD 243
- Madison-Virgil USD 386
- Morris County USD 417
- Wabaunsee East USD 330

== Communities ==
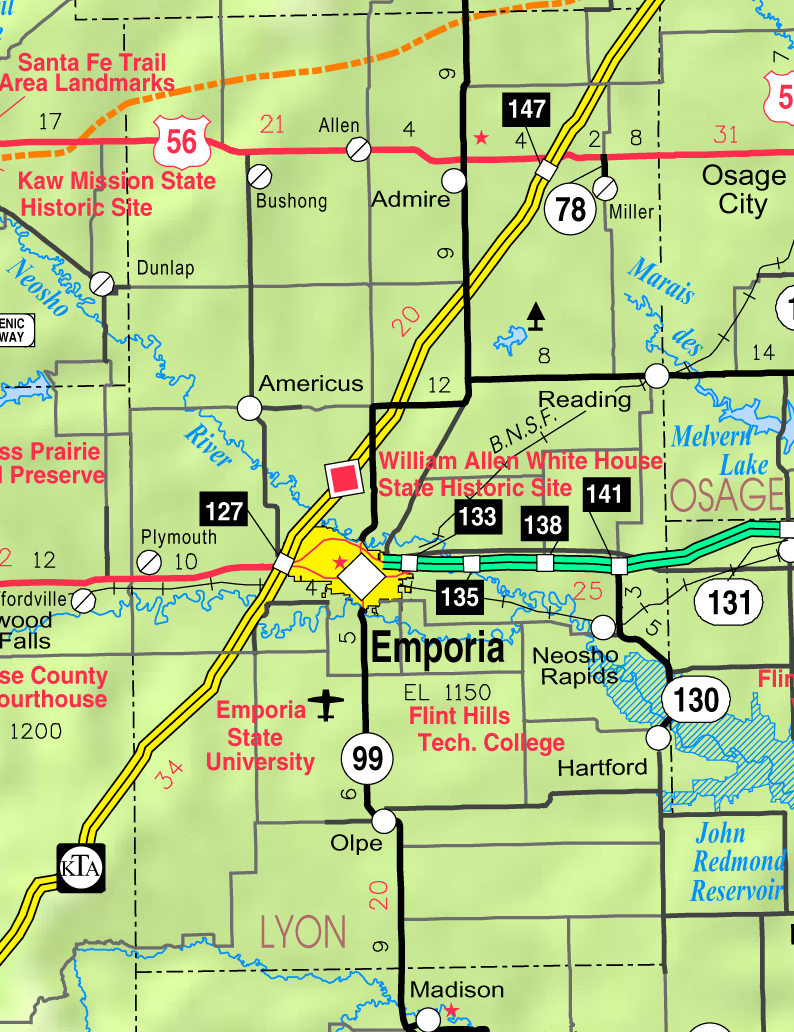
2005 map of Lyon County (map legend)

List of townships / incorporated cities / unincorporated communities / extinct former communities within Lyon County.

=== Cities ===
- Admire
- Allen
- Americus
- Bushong
- Emporia (county seat)
- Hartford
- Neosho Rapids
- Olpe
- Reading

=== Unincorporated communities ===
- Miller
- Plymouth

=== Townships ===
Lyon County is divided into eleven townships. The city of Emporia is considered governmentally independent and is excluded from the census figures for the townships. In the following table, the population center is the largest city (or cities) included in that township's population total, if it is of a significant size.

Sources: 2000 U.S. Gazetteer from the U.S. Census Bureau.
Township	FIPS	Population center	Population	Population density /km^{2} (/sq mi)	Land area km^{2} (sq mi)	Water area km^{2} (sq mi)	Water %	Geographic coordinates
Agnes City	00525		430	2 (4)	279 (108)	0 (0)	0.15%	38°39′54″N 96°13′50″W
Americus	01700		1,503	7 (17)	225 (87)	1 (0)	0.35%	38°31′12″N 96°16′0″W
Center	11800		1,198	4 (10)	308 (119)	3 (1)	0.82%	38°14′17″N 96°13′13″W
Elmendaro	20687		788	4 (10)	257 (99)	1 (0)	0.31%	38°15′31″N 96°1′8″W
Emporia	21300		907	8 (21)	143 (55)	2 (1)	1.20%	38°23′7″N 96°10′13″W
Fremont	24750		903	5 (12)	184 (71)	1 (0)	0.33%	38°29′35″N 96°9′17″W
Ivy	34700		269	3 (9)	88 (34)	0 (0)	0.07%	38°38′23″N 96°5′25″W
Jackson	34825		979	4 (11)	227 (88)	1 (1)	0.62%	38°23′39″N 96°0′37″W
Pike	55825		1,034	6 (17)	139 (54)	0 (0)	0.35%	38°24′13″N 96°17′39″W
Reading	58625		487	3 (8)	175 (67)	1 (1)	0.79%	38°31′35″N 95°59′56″W
Waterloo	75925		284	2 (5)	154 (59)	1 (0)	0.40%	38°41′32″N 96°0′26″W

== Notable people ==
R. Lee Ermey was born in Emporia on March 24, 1944, and died on April 15, 2018. He was a retired United States Marine Corps Gunnery Sergeant, Drill Instructor and actor. Ermey was often best known for his roles of authority figures, such as his breakout performance as Gunnery Sergeant Hartman in Full Metal Jacket, Mayor Tilman in the Alan Parker film Mississippi Burning, Bill Bowerman in Prefontaine, Sheriff Hoyt in The Texas Chainsaw Massacre remake, and plastic army men leader Sarge in the Toy Story films.

Homer Woodson Hargiss was an innovative college football coach who regularly used the forward pass and records show that it was used as early as 1910, three years before Knute Rockne began to call the play. He was head coach at both the College of Emporia and Emporia State. He is also credited with inventing the huddle.

Jerry Kill was the head football coach for the Minnesota Golden Gophers. He has over 100 wins in his career as a head coach, having worked as a head coach through several institutions at the college level.

Dean Smith is a retired American head coach of men's college basketball. Originally from Emporia, Kansas, Smith has been called a “coaching legend” by the Basketball Hall of Fame. Smith is best known for his successful 36-year coaching tenure at the University of North Carolina at Chapel Hill. Smith coached from 1961 to 1997 and retired as the NCAA Division I men's basketball record-holder for victories (879), a record which was surpassed by Bob Knight in 2007, Mike Krzyzewski in 2011, and Jim Boeheim in 2012. During his tenure as head coach of North Carolina, the team won two national titles and appeared in 11 Final Fours.

William Allen White was a renowned American newspaper editor, politician, author, and leader of the Progressive movement. Between 1896 and his death White became the iconic spokesman for middle America. He won a 1923 Pulitzer Prize for his editorial "To an Anxious Friend," published July 27, 1922, after being arrested in a dispute over free speech following objections to the way the state of Kansas handled the men who participated in the Great Railroad Strike of 1922.

Maud Wagner was the first known female tattoo artist in the United States. She was a circus performer and traveled with her husband as both tattoo artists and as "tattooed attractions."

== See also ==
- Flint Hills Trail
- Jacobs Creek Flood
- National Register of Historic Places listings in Lyon County, Kansas

Community information for Kansas

- Kansas locations by per capita income
- List of counties in Kansas
- List of townships in Kansas
- List of cities in Kansas
- List of unincorporated communities in Kansas
- List of ghost towns in Kansas
