= Seward Township, Kansas =

Township in Seward County, Kansas, U.S.

Seward Township
- Township
- Location within Seward County
- Coordinates: 37.317371°N 100.862676°W
- Country: United States
- State: Kansas
- County: Seward

Government
  - Districts 1, 4, and 5 County Commissioners: Todd Stanton, John Mettlen, and Steven A. Helm

Area
  - Total: 214.904 sq mi (556.60 km^{2})
  - Land: 214.843 sq mi (556.44 km^{2})
  - Water: 0.061 sq mi (0.16 km^{2}) 0.03%

Population (2020)
  - Total: 235
  - Density: 1.09/sq mi (0.422/km^{2})
- Time zone: UTC-6 (CST)
  - Summer (DST): UTC-5 (CDT)
- Area code: 620
- GNIS feature ID: 470585

Seward Township is a township in Seward County, Kansas, United States. As of the 2020 census, its population was 235.

== History ==
There used to be a fourth township in Seward County, Morris Township, but it was absorbed into Seward Township in the 1970s.

== Geography ==
Seward Township covers an area of 214.904 square miles (556.60 square kilometers). The Cimarron River flows through it.

=== Adjacent townships ===
Haskell Township, Haskell County; Lockport Township, Haskell County
Dudley Township, Haskell County	northwest	north	northeast	Mertilla Township, Meade County
Moscow Township, Stevens County	west	self	east	West Plains Township, Meade County
Liberal Township, Seward County	southwest		southeast	Fargo Township, Seward County

== Transportation ==
=== Major highways ===
- US-56
- US-83
- US-160
- K-190
