= K-145 (Kansas highway) =

State highway in Kansas, United States

K-145
- Former K-145 highlighted in red

Route information
- Maintained by KDOT
- Length: 1.527 mi (2.457 km)
- Existed: January 4, 1939–April 23, 1965

Major junctions
- West end: US 83 / US 160 in Sublette
- East end: US 56 in Sublette

Location
- Country: United States
- State: Kansas
- Counties: Haskell

Highway system
- Kansas State Highway System; Interstate; US; State; Spurs
| ← K-144 | → K-146 |

K-145 was a 1.527-mile-long (2.457 km) state highway in the U.S. state of Kansas. K-145's western terminus was at U.S. Route 83 (US-83) and US-160 west of the city of Sublette and the eastern terminus was at US-56 in Sublette.

K-145 was designated a state highway in 1939, to a highway from US-83 east to K-45 in Sublette. On June 27, 1956, K-45 was decommissioned and became US-56. Then in 1965, K-145 was decommissioned as a state highway.

== Route description ==
K-145 began at US-83 and US-160 and began travelling east. It then passed to the north of a small group of houses, and after 1 it intersected County Road NN. From here, it continued east as it entered Sublette and became Haws Avenue. It continued through the city until it reached North Inman Street, where it turned south. It started south along North Inman Street through a residential neighborhood, then reached its eastern terminus at US-56.

== History ==
K-145 was designated in a January 4, 1939 resolution, to a highway from US-83 and US-160 east to K-45 in Sublette. On June 27, 1956, K-45 was decommissioned and became US-56. Then in an April 23, 1965 resolution, K-145 was decommissioned as a state highway.

== Major intersections ==
The entire route was in Haskell County.

| Location | mi | km | Destinations | Notes |
|---|---|---|---|---|
| Haskell Township | 0.000 | 0.000 | US 83 / US 160 | Western terminus |
| Sublette | 1.527 | 2.457 | US 56 | Eastern terminus |
1.000 mi = 1.609 km; 1.000 km = 0.621 mi
