= K-144 (Kansas highway) =

State highway in Kansas, U.S.

K-144
- K-144 highlighted in red

Route information
- Maintained by KDOT
- Length: 16.825 mi (27.077 km)
- Existed: September 25, 1957–present

Major junctions
- West end: US-83 / US-160 north-northwest of Sublette
- East end: US-56 northeast of Copeland

Location
- Country: United States
- State: Kansas
- Counties: Haskell, Gray

Highway system
- Kansas State Highway System; Interstate; US; State; Spurs
← K-143	→ K-145

K-144 is a 16.825-mile-long (27.077 km) east–west state highway in the U.S. state of Kansas. K-144's western terminus is at a diamond interchange with U.S. Route 83 (US-83) and US-160 north-northwest of the City of Sublette and the eastern terminus is at US-56 northeast of the City of Copeland. K-144 travels through flat rural farmlands and is a two-lane road its entire length.

In a May 9, 1956 meeting, it was approved to add K-144 to the state highway system as soon as Haskell and Gray counties had brought the road up to state highway standards. By late 1957, required projects were complete and on September 25, 1957, K-144 was designated as a state highway. Between 2016 and 2017, the junction with US-83 and US-160 was converted to a diamond interchange as part of a project to expand US-83.

== Route description ==
K-144's western terminus is at a diamond interchange with US-83 and US-160 north-northwest of Sublette. From here the highway begins traveling east and after about 1.8 miles (2.9 km) intersects County Road Oo. The roadway proceeds through flat rural farmland for another three miles (4.8 km) then intersects County Road Rr. K-144 continues east for about three miles (4.8 km) it reaches an intersection with County Road Uu, which travels south to US-56. From here it continues another approximately two miles (3.2 km) before reaching an intersection with County Road Ww. K-144 proceeds eastward for another approximately two miles (3.2 km) then crosses into Gray County. About one mile (1.6 km) into Gray County it intersects RS-285, also known as Plains Road or Dice Street. From here it continues for another 3.8 miles (6.1 km) through flat rural farmlands before reaching an at-grade crossing with a Cimarron Valley Railroad track then reaches its eastern terminus at US-56.

The Kansas Department of Transportation (KDOT) tracks the traffic levels on its highways, and in 2019, they determined that on average the traffic varied from 870 vehicles per day near the western terminus to 975 vehicles per day near the eastern terminus. K-144 is not included in the National Highway System. The National Highway System is a system of highways important to the nation's defense, economy, and mobility. K-144 does connect to the National Highway System at its western terminus at US-83 and US-160.

== History ==
The route was first authorized by the State Highway Commission of Kansas, now known as KDOT, in a May 9, 1956 meeting, as soon as Haskell and Gray counties had brought the road up to state highway standards. Then by mid 1957, the counties had finished projects to bring the road up to state highway standards and on September 25, 1957, it was designated as K-144. When first planned, the eastern terminus was K-45, but was redesignated as US-56 by the time K-144 was established.

In late 2006, local consultation meetings began about rebuilding US-83 from Sublette north to Scott City. In 2009, KDOT began a future transportation needs study on the corridor. In a July 2010 study, plans were included for a diamond interchange to be built at the K-144 intersection. In February 2016, KDOT accepted a bid of $22.3 million (equivalent to $29.9 million in 2025) to convert the western terminus to a diamond interchange as well as reconstruct a 6-mile (9.7 km) section of US-83. On June 26, 2017, K-144 was closed and on June 27, 2017, US-160 was closed from K-190 east to K-144 to allow work to begin to realign US-160 and K-144 with the new overpass. On July 25, 2017, US-83 was shifted onto the new alignment. On September 20, 2017, US-160 and K-144 reopened, with only minor work remaining to complete the entire project.

== Major intersections ==
County	Location	mi	km	Destinations	Notes
Haskell	Haskell Township	0.000	0.000	US-160 west – Ulysses	Continuation past US-83
Haskell	Haskell Township	0.000	0.000	US-83 / US-160 east – Liberal, Garden City	Western terminus; diamond interchange
Gray	Copeland Township	16.825	27.077	US-56 – Dodge City, Sublette	Eastern terminus
1.000 mi = 1.609 km; 1.000 km = 0.621 mi
