= Santa Fe, Kansas =

Ghost town in Haskell County, Kansas, United States

- Ghost town
- Location within Kansas Location within the United States
- Coordinates: 37°34′10″N 100°52′17″W
- Country: United States
- State: Kansas
- County: Haskell
- Township: Haskell
- Platted: July 31, 1887
- Incorporated: January 2, 1888
- Abandoned: 1926
- Named for: Santa Fe Trail
- Elevation: 2,031 ft (619 m)

Population
  - Total: 0
- Time zone: UTC-6 (CST)
  - Summer (DST): UTC-5 (CDT)
- Area code: 620

Santa Fe is a ghost town in the center of Haskell Township, Haskell County, Kansas, United States. It was also the county seat of Haskell County for more than the first quarter of a century of the county's existence. It was located along the road currently designated as U.S. Route 83 (US 83, originally K‑22), just north of its junction with U.S. Route 160 (K‑46 [1926–1930]) and K‑144.

== History ==
On June 4, 1885 Star City was platted at a site just east of the location where Santa Fe was later established (across the current US 83). Shortly thereafter a company bought the Star City townsite and renamed the community after the Santa Fe Trail (which passed about 5 miles [8.0 km] to the north). The new townsite was platted June 12, 1886 and officially recorded on July 31, 1886. At the time, it was located within Finney County, but by the next year the community found itself at the center of the new Haskell County, after that county was created on March 23, 1887. Several months later, on July 1, 1887, Santa Fe became the temporary county seat and by November 7, it was designated as the permanent county seat (at least for the next 26 years). On January 2, 1888, Santa Fe was incorporated as a city. About that time, the population of Santa Fe reached its peak, estimated to be (depending the source) from 600–700 to as high as 18,000. However, within a few years the population of Santa Fe (and Haskell County) began a steady, but fairly rapid decline.

On February 5, 1913, a referendum was held in Haskel County to change the county seat to Sublette (about 8 miles [13 km] to the south-southeast), but the vote failed. However, despite a district court ruling on April 11 which uphold the results of the poll, the Kansas Supreme Court overturned that decision on June 7 and Sublette became the new county seat. Over the next five years, the majority of the remaining town residents (about 300) left the community, with most moving to Sublette (along with many of their houses and other buildings). In addition to moving closer to the railroad, which passed through Sublette, the decline may have also been affected by the Spanish flu (1918 influenza pandemic). The post office, which had been established June 16, 1886, closed July 31, 1925. The townsite was officially declared as abandoned by the county commission in 1926, even though it had been deserted for more than a year or two before.

By 1988 there were no buildings remaining and the townsite had been converted to farmland. Notwithstanding, there is a meat processing plant and a huge feed lot in the area.
