= U.S. Route 56 =

US highway

U.S. Route 56
- US 56 highlighted in red

Route information
- Length: 640.250 mi (1,030.382 km)
- Existed: 1957–present

Major junctions
- West end: I-25 BL / US 412 / NM 21 at Springer, NM
- US 287 near Boise City, OK; US-50 at Dodge City, KS; I-135 / US-81 at McPherson, KS; I-335 / Kansas Turnpike near Admire, KS; US-75 near Scranton, KS; US-59 near Baldwin City, KS; I-35 / US-50 at Gardner, KS; I-435 / US-50 at Lenexa, KS; US-69 at Overland Park, KS; I-35 / US-69 / US-169 at Shawnee Mission, KS
- East end: US 71 at Kansas City, MO

Location
- Country: United States
- States: New Mexico, Oklahoma, Kansas, Missouri

Highway system
- United States Numbered Highway System; List; Special; Divided
- New Mexico State Highway System; Interstate; US; State; Scenic
- Oklahoma State Highway System; Interstate; US; State; Turnpikes
- Kansas State Highway System; Interstate; US; State; Spurs
- Missouri State Highway System; Interstate; US; State; Supplemental
← US 55	US	→ US 57
← NM 55	NM	→ NM 56
← SH-55	OK	→ SH-56
← K-55	KS	→ K-57
← I-55	MO	→ I-57

U.S. Route 56 (US 56) is an east–west United States highway that runs for approximately 640 miles (1,030 km) in the Midwestern United States. US 56's western terminus is at Interstate 25 Business (I-25 Bus.), US 412 and New Mexico State Road 21 (NM 21) in Springer, New Mexico and the highway's eastern terminus is at US 71 in Kansas City, Missouri. Much of it follows the Santa Fe Trail.

== Route description ==
The highway passes through New Mexico, Oklahoma, Kansas, and Missouri. The eastbound shoulder also touches a corner of Texas at a small road junction near the New Mexico/Oklahoma border.

=== New Mexico ===
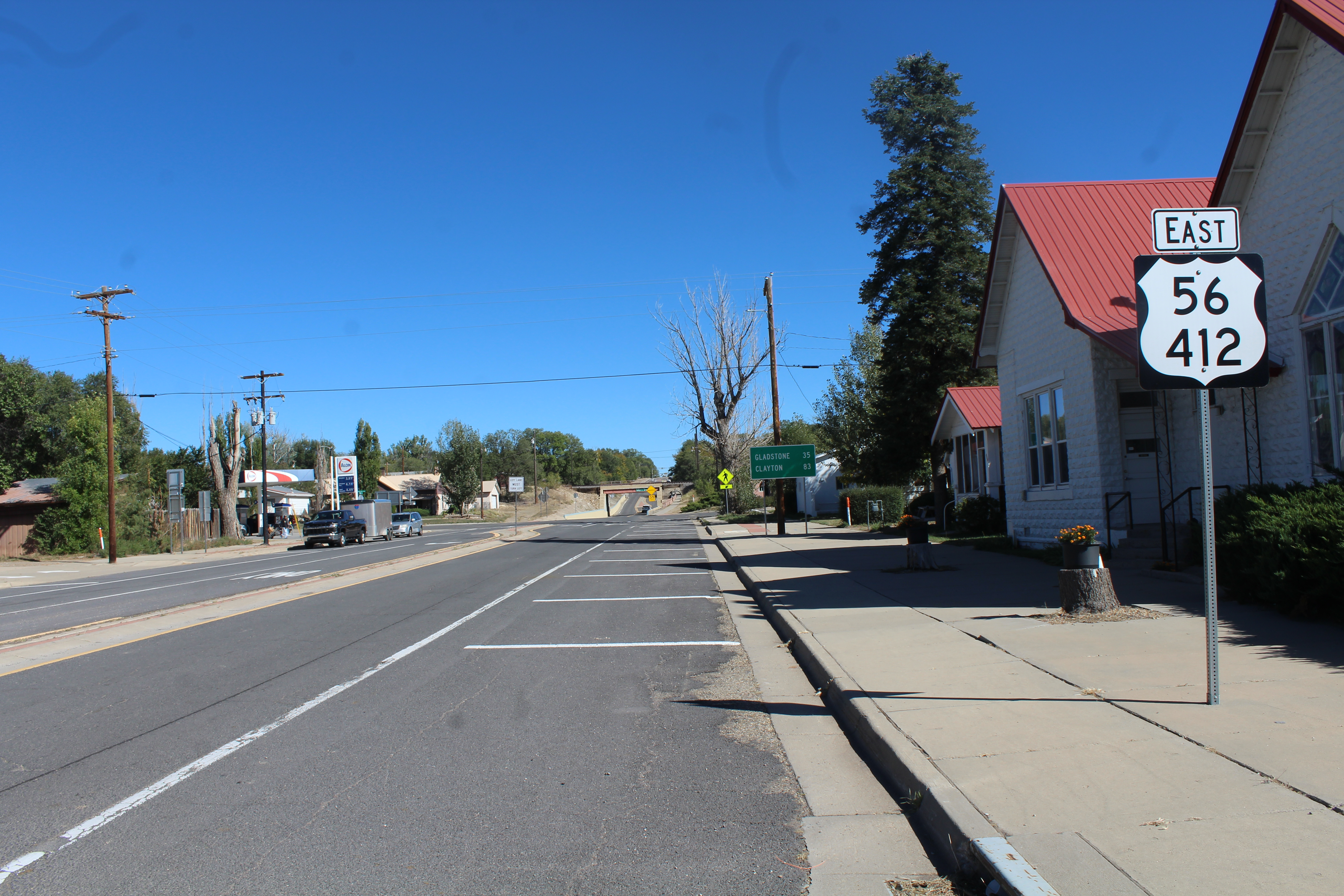
US 56 & US 412 eastbound in Springer

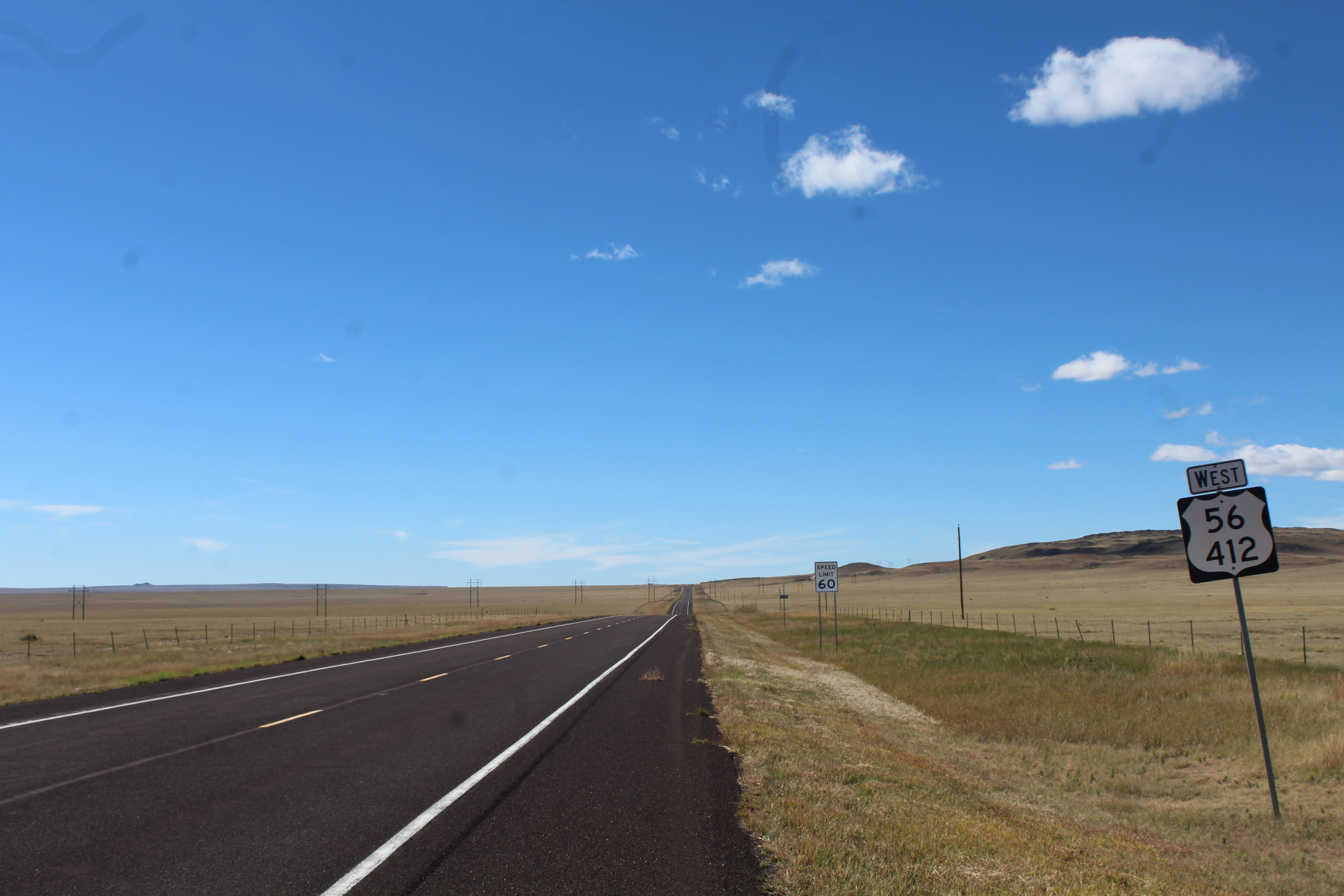
US 56 & US 412 east of Gladstone just after NM 120

US 56 runs concurrent with US 412 for its entire length in New Mexico, and are signed as such through the state. The two routes begin in Springer and head east towards Abbot, where they serve as the northern terminus of State Road 39. Continuing east, US 56/412 meet the southern terminus of NM 193 south of Farley, the northern terminus of NM 120 east of Gladstone, and the southern terminus of NM 453. US 56/412 intersect US 64 and US 87 in Clayton, New Mexico, and US 64 joins with US 56/412 in their trek northeast. The three routes serve as the southern terminus of NM 406 as they enter the Kiowa National Grassland. The three routes then cross into Oklahoma together.

=== Oklahoma ===
US-56's short path through Oklahoma consists of a diagonal slice across the western part of the Oklahoma Panhandle. US-56/64/412 enter Oklahoma near the southwest corner of the Panhandle, where they also enter Rita Blanca National Grassland. They leave the grassland near Felt. Three miles (4.8 km) southwest of Boise City, US-385 joins the concurrency. The routes then enter Boise City, where they enter a traffic circle around the Cimarron County Courthouse that involves US-56, US-64, US-385, US-412, State Highway 3, and SH-325. After leaving the traffic circle, US-56 overlaps US-64, US-412, and SH-3. 1.7 miles (2.7 km) east of the courthouse, US-56 meets US-287 at an interchange. US-56/64/412/SH-3 continue northeast for 6 miles (9.7 km), where US-56 splits to travel northeast on its own.

The route parallels the Cimarron Valley Railroad for the remainder of its time in Oklahoma. Keyes is the next town on US-56, and it also serves as the northern terminus of SH-171 where the two highways intersect. US-56 crosses into Texas County east of Sturgis. Just before crossing the Kansas line, US-56 meets the north end of SH-95. US-56 then enters Kansas on the east edge of Elkhart.

=== Kansas ===
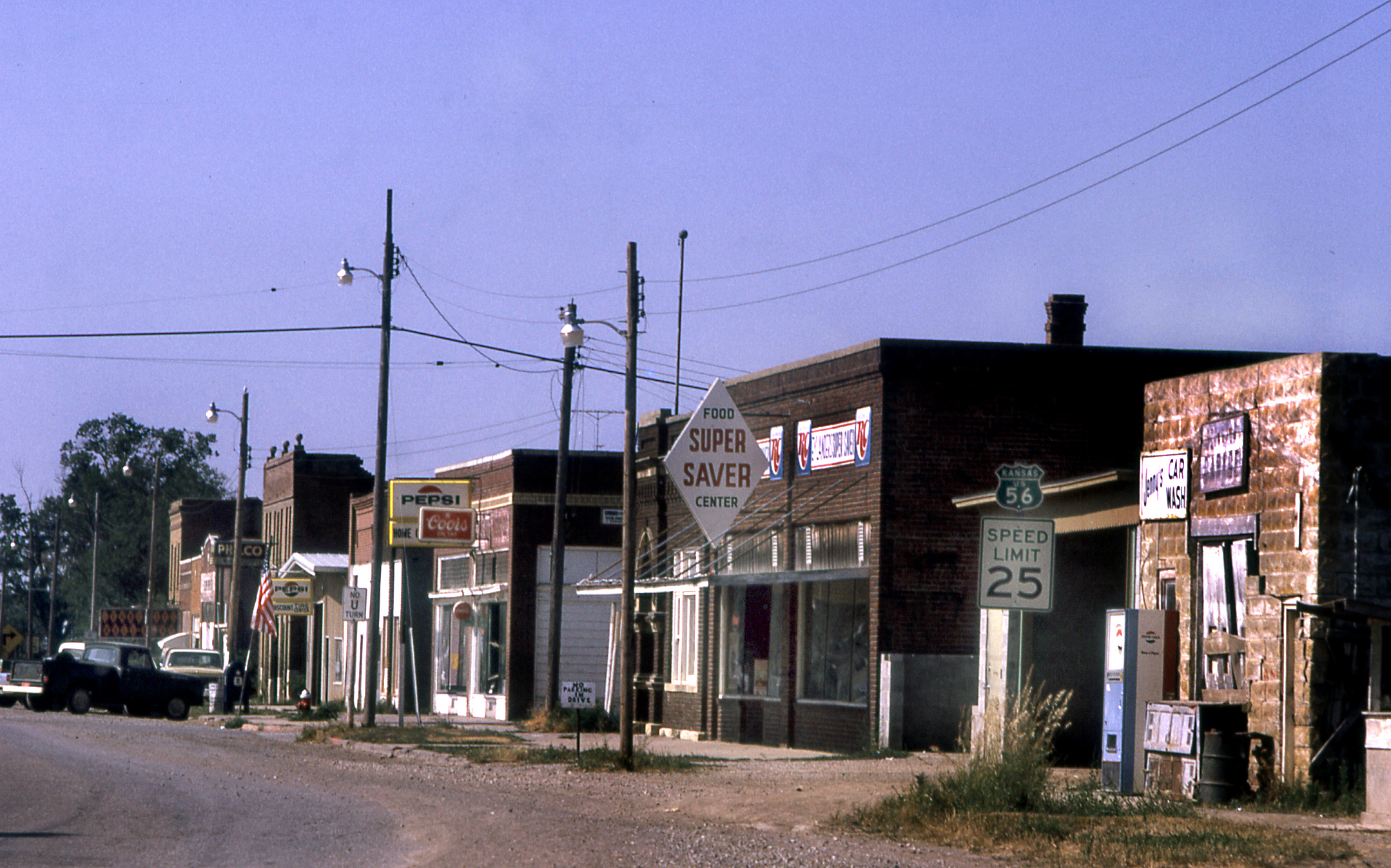
Scranton, Kansas on US 56, in 1974

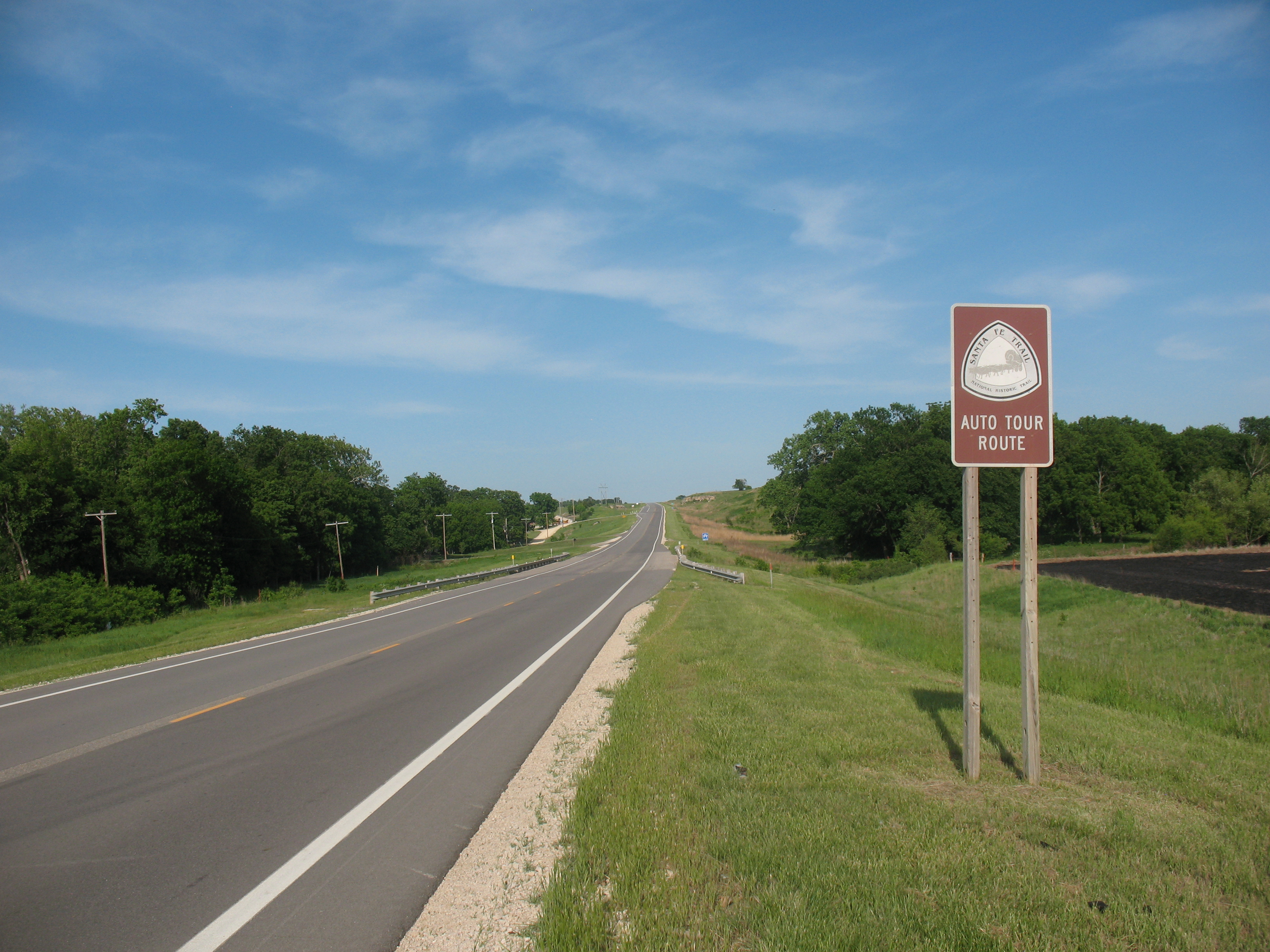
US 56 (Santa Fe Auto Tour Route) east of Council Grove, Kansas

US-56 enters the state at the Kansas/Oklahoma border near Elkhart. It weaves its way across the state from southwest to northeast, passing through such towns as Dodge City, Great Bend, McPherson, Council Grove, and Baldwin City. It joins with I-35/US-50 east of Gardner, and goes northeast with I-35 into the Kansas City Metro Area. It exits the state as part of Shawnee Mission Parkway in Mission Woods.

=== Missouri ===
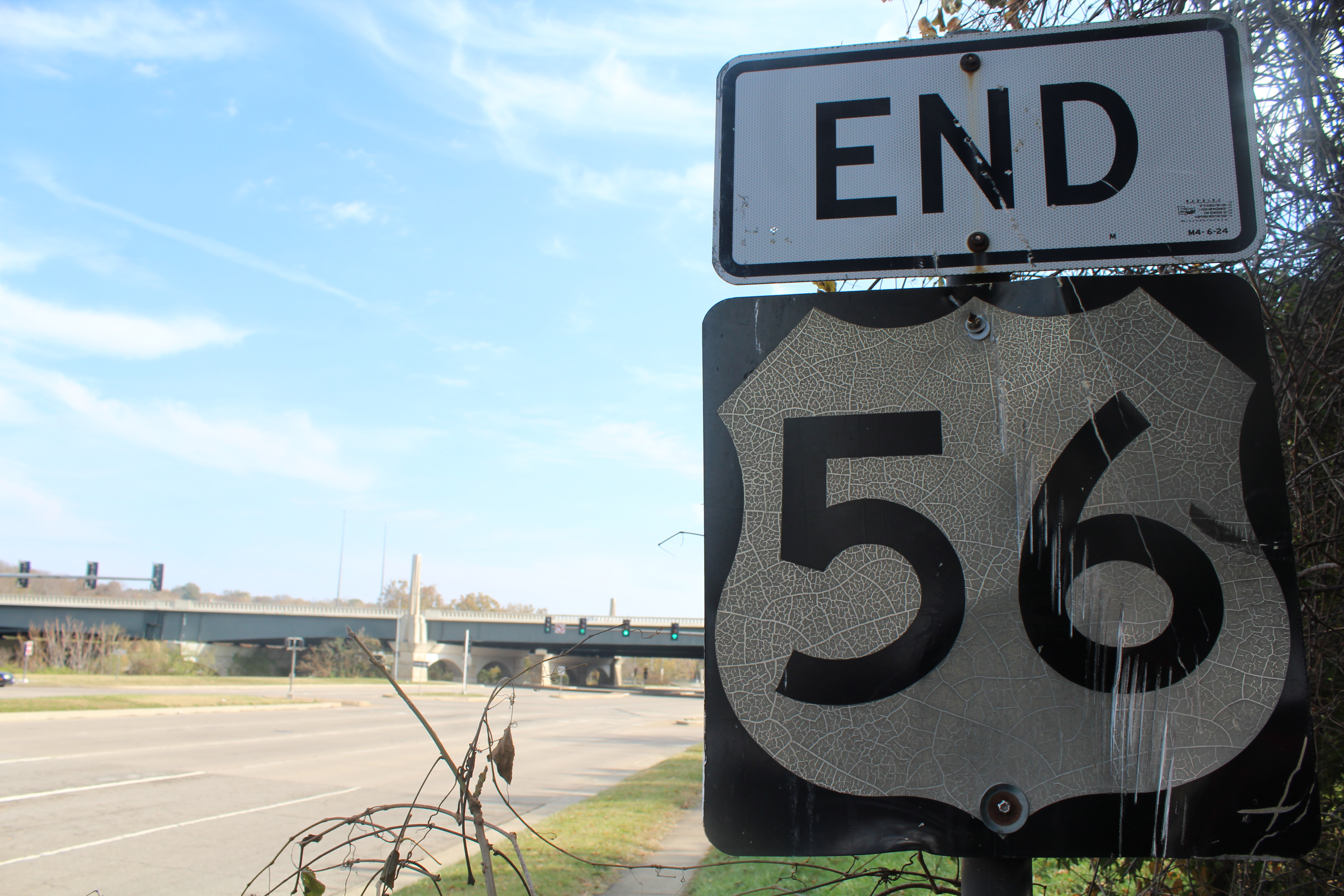
Eastern terminus of US 56 at US 71 in Kansas City, MO

For one mile (1.6 km) in Kansas City's Country Club Plaza, Route 56 follows the noted boulevard Ward Parkway along with 47th St through the Country Club Plaza. The route ends at an intersection with U.S. Route 71. It also includes Blue Parkway and Swope Parkway at certain points.

== History ==
Green US-56 marker formerly used in Kansas

In the early 1950s, towns along what was then the K-45 corridor, connecting Ellsworth, Kansas to the Oklahoma state line at Elkhart, formed the Mid-Continent Diagonal Highway Association to push for a new highway from Springer, New Mexico (on US 85) northeast across the Oklahoma Panhandle, along K-45, and continuing to Manitowoc, Wisconsin on Lake Michigan. By mid-1954, it was being promoted as U.S. Route 55 between the Great Lakes and the Southwestern United States. The first submissions to the American Association of State Highway Officials (AASHO) to establish the route were made in 1954; all placed the northeast end at Manitowoc, Wisconsin (absorbing US 151 from Cedar Rapids, Iowa), while they varied on whether the southwest end was to be at Albuquerque, New Mexico or Nogales, Arizona. The first route considered in northeast Kansas was via US 40 from Ellsworth to Topeka and K-4 and US 59 via Atchison to St. Joseph, Missouri. A revised route adopted in March 1955, due to AASHO objections to the original route, which traveled concurrently with other U.S. Highways for over half of its length, followed K-14, K-18, US 24, K-63, K-16, and US 59 via Lincoln and Manhattan. In July, the US 50-N Association proposed a plan that would have eliminated US 50N by routing US 55 along most of its length, from Larned east to Baldwin Junction, and then along US 59 to Lawrence and K-10 to Kansas City; towns on US 50N west of Larned, which would have been bypassed, led a successful fight against this.

However, in September of that year, the Kansas Highway Commission accepted that plan, taking US 55 east to Kansas City. On June 27, 1956, the AASHO Route Numbering Committee considered this refined plan for US 55, between Springer, New Mexico and Kansas City, Missouri, with a short US 155 along the remaining portion of US 50N from Larned west to Garden City. The committee approved the request, but since the proposed route was more east–west than north–south, it changed it to an even number – US 56 – and the spur to US 156.

On June 26, 1958, AASHO denied the New Mexico Department of Transportation's request to extend US 56 west from Springer to Santa Fe, which would have followed US 85, US 84 and US 285.

State Highway 114
- Location: Near Boise City, Oklahoma – near Elkhart, Kansas
- Existed: c. 1961

US 56 originally took a different route between Boise City, Oklahoma and Elkhart, Kansas. The original route followed US 64 east to an intersection south of Eva. It then split off to the north towards Elkhart. By 1961, the section north of US 64 had been overlaid with SH-95. The following year, US 56 was rerouted over SH-114, bringing it to its current diagonal path across the Oklahoma Panhandle. The old alignment is still on the Oklahoma highway system as the north half of SH-95.

== Major intersections ==
State	County	Location	mi	km	Exit	Destinations	Notes
New Mexico	Colfax	Springer	0.000	0.000		NM 21 west (4th Street west) – Miami	Continuation beyond western terminus
New Mexico	Colfax	Springer	0.000	0.000		I-25 BL (Maxwell Avenue) to I-25 / NM 58 – Las Vegas, Raton, Cimarron, Taos Ski Valley, Springer Lake US 412 begins	Western terminus of US 56/US 412; western end of US 412 overlap
New Mexico	Colfax	Abbott	19.719	31.735		NM 39 south – Roy, Mosquero	Northern terminus of NM 39
New Mexico	Colfax		31.690	51.000		NM 193 north – Farley	Southern terminus of NM 193
New Mexico	Union		46.688	75.137		NM 120 south – Yates	Northern terminus of NM 120
New Mexico	Union		54.040	86.969		NM 453 north – Grenville	Southern terminus of NM 453
New Mexico	Union	Clayton	82.400	132.610		NM 402 (S. 1st Avenue)	
New Mexico	Union	Clayton	82.530	132.819		US 64 west / US 87 (1st Street) – Dalhart, Raton	Western end of US 64 overlap
New Mexico	Union		85.890	138.227		NM 406 north – Seneca	Southern terminus of NM 406
New Mexico–Oklahoma line			94.172 0.00	151.555 0.00		Mileposts reset at state line	
Oklahoma	Cimarron		28.49	45.85		US 385 south – Dalhart	Western end of US-385 overlap
Oklahoma	Cimarron	Boise City	32.31	52.00		US 385 north / SH-3 west (Cimarron Avenue north) / SH-325 west (Main Street west) – Kenton, Denver Co.	Traffic circle around Cimarron County courthouse; eastern end of US-385 concurrency; western end of SH-3 concurrency; eastern terminus of SH-325
Oklahoma	Cimarron		34.03	54.77		US 287 – Amarillo, Denver CO, Stratford TX	Interchange
Oklahoma	Cimarron		40.09	64.52		US 64 / US 412 / SH-3 east – Guymon	Eastern end of US-64/US-412/SH-3 overlap
Oklahoma	Cimarron	Keyes	48.54	78.12		SH-171 south – Kerrick	Northern terminus of SH-171
Oklahoma	Texas		71.46	115.00		SH-95 south – Guymon	Northern terminus of SH-95
Oklahoma–Kansas line			71.68 0.000	115.36 0.000		Mileposts reset at state line	
Kansas	Morton	Elkhart	2.366	3.808		K-27 north – Richfield	Southern terminus of K-27
Kansas	Morton	Rolla	17.746	28.559		K-51 west – Richfield	Western end of K-51 overlap
Kansas	Stevens		25.994	41.833		K-25 south – Guymon OK	Western end of K-25 overlap
Kansas	Stevens	Hugoton	33.629	54.121		K-51 east – Liberal	Eastern end of K-51 overlap
Kansas	Stevens	Hugoton	35.775	57.574		K-25 north – Ulysses	Eastern end of K-25 overlap
Kansas	Seward	No major junctions					
Kansas	Haskell	Satanta	61.813	99.478		K-190 west – Ulysses	Western end of K-190 overlap
Kansas	Haskell	Satanta	62.893	101.216		K-190 east – Liberal, Meade	Eastern end of K-190 overlap
Kansas	Haskell	Sublette	69.316	111.553		US-160 / US-83 – Liberal, Garden City, Meade	
Kansas	Gray		87.201	140.336		K-144 west – Ulysses	Eastern terminus of K-144
Kansas	Gray		100.191	161.242		K-23 – Cimarron, Meade	
Kansas	Ford	Dodge City	116.209	187.020		US-400 west – Garden City	Western end of US-400 overlap
Kansas	Ford	Dodge City	119.752	192.722		US-283 south – Minneola	Western end of US-283 overlap; roundabout
Kansas	Ford	Dodge City	123.182	198.242		US-400 east – Greensburg	Eastern end of US-400 overlap
Kansas	Ford	Dodge City	126.894	204.216		US-50 west – Cimarron	Western end of US-50 overlap
Kansas	Ford	Wright	128.630	207.010		US-283 north – Jetmore	Eastern end of US-283 overlap
Kansas	Edwards	Kinsley	156.790	252.329		US-50 east – Hutchinson	Eastern end of US-50 overlap
Kansas	Edwards	Kinsley	116.838	188.033		US-183 south – Greensburg	Western end of US-183 overlap
Kansas	Pawnee		165.995	267.143		US-183 north – La Crosse	Eastern end of US-183 overlap
Kansas	Pawnee	Larned	182.397	293.540		K-19 Spur south – Belpre	Northern terminus of K-19 Spur
Kansas	Pawnee	Larned	183.810	295.814		K-156 west – Jetmore	Western end of K-156 overlap; former US-156 west
Kansas	Barton	Great Bend	204.229	328.675		K-96 west – Ness City	Western end of K-96 overlap
Kansas	Barton	Great Bend	206.006	331.535		US-281 – St. John, Russell	
Kansas	Barton		209.801	337.642		K-156 east – Ellsworth	Eastern end of K-156 overlap; former US-156 east
Kansas	Rice	Lyons	236.876	381.215		K-96 east / K-14 (Grand Avenue) – Ellsworth, Hutchinson	Eastern end of K-96 overlap
Kansas	McPherson	McPherson	265.669	427.553		K-153 south – Hutchinson	Northern terminus of K-153; former US-81
Kansas	McPherson	McPherson	266.667	429.159		US 81 Bus. south – Newton, Hutchinson, Opera House	Western end of US-81 Bus. overlap
Kansas	McPherson	McPherson	269.185	433.211		US 81 Bus. ends / I-135 / US-81 – Salina, Wichita	Eastern end of US-81 Bus. overlap; I-135 exit 60
Kansas	Marion		285.158	458.917		K-15 south – Newton	Western end of K-15 overlap
Kansas	Marion	Lehigh	286.642	461.306		K-168 north – Lehigh	Southern terminus of K-168
Kansas	Marion	Hillsboro	291.156	468.570		K-15 north – Abilene	Eastern end of K-15 overlap
Kansas	Marion	Marion	301.399	485.055		K-256 south – Marion	Northern terminus of K-256
Kansas	Marion		305.390	491.478		US-77 south / K-150 east – Emporia, El Dorado	Western end of US-77 overlap; western terminus of K-150; roundabout
Kansas	Dickinson	Herington	324.997	523.032		US 56 Bus. east – Herington	Western terminus of US-56 Bus.; no access to US-56 Bus. from US-56 westbound
Kansas	Dickinson	Herington	327.060	526.352		US-77 north / US 56 Bus. west – Herington, Junction City	Eastern end of US-77 overlap; eastern terminus of US-56 Bus.
Kansas	Morris		337.304	542.838		K-149 north – White City	Southern terminus of K-149
Kansas	Morris	Council Grove	351.155– 351.323	565.129– 565.400		K-177 – Cottonwood Falls, Manhattan	
Kansas	Lyon	Admire	372.731	599.852		K-99 – Emporia, Alma	
Kansas	Lyon		376.162	605.374		I-335 / Kansas Turnpike – Emporia, Topeka	Kansas Tpke. exit 147
Kansas	Lyon	Miller	378.469	609.087		K-78 south – Miller	Northern terminus of K-78
Kansas	Osage		386.959	622.750		K-31 south / 229th Street – Osage City	Wye intersection; western end of K-31 overlap
Kansas	Osage	Burlingame	393.732	633.650		K-31 north – Harveyville	Eastern end of K-31 overlap
Kansas	Osage		383.775	617.626		US-75 – Lyndon, Topeka	
Kansas	Douglas	Baldwin City	426.126	685.783		US-59 – Lawrence, Ottawa	
Kansas	Douglas		436.919	703.153		K-33 south – Wellsville	Northern terminus of K-33
Kansas	Johnson	Gardner				New Century AirCenter	Interchange
Kansas	Johnson	Gardner	448.458	721.723		I-35 south / US-50 west – Wichita	Western end of I-35/US-50 overlap; I-35 exit 210
Kansas	Johnson	Olathe	451.688	726.921	214	Lone Elm Road / 159th Street	Exit numbers follow I-35
Kansas	Johnson	Olathe	453.208	729.368	215	US-169 south / K-7 – Paola	Western end of US-169 concurrency
Kansas	Johnson	Olathe	454.468	731.395	217	Old Highway 56	Westbound exit and eastbound entrance
Kansas	Johnson	Olathe	455.668	733.327	218	Santa Fe Street	
Kansas	Johnson	Olathe	457.998	737.076	220	119th Street	
Kansas	Johnson	Lenexa	460.198	740.617	222A	I-435 / US-50 east	Eastern end of US-50 concurrency; I-435 exit 83
Kansas	Johnson	Lenexa	460.198	740.617	222B	I-435 west to K-10	I-435 exit 83
Kansas	Johnson	Lenexa	461.658	742.967	224	95th Street	Diverging diamond interchange
Kansas	Johnson	Lenexa–Overland Park line	462.908	744.978	225A	87th Street Parkway	
Kansas	Johnson	Overland Park–Lenexa line	462.908	744.978	225C	75th Street	Eastbound exit only
Kansas	Johnson	Lenexa	463.398	745.767	225B	US-69 south (Overland Parkway)	Western end of US-69 concurrency; westbound exit and eastbound entrance
Kansas	Johnson	Overland Park–Merriam line	464.788	748.004	227	75th Street	No eastbound exit
Kansas	Johnson	Merriam	465.828	749.677	228A	67th Street	
Kansas	Johnson	Merriam	466.348	750.514		I-35 north – Des Moines	Eastern end of I-35 overlap; I-35 exit 228B
Kansas	Johnson	Overland Park–Shawnee line	467.710	752.706		US-69 north (Metcalf Avenue) to I-635	Eastern end of US-69 overlap; interchange
Kansas	Johnson	Mission–Fairway line				Roe Avenue / Johnson Drive	Interchange; westbound exit and eastbound entrance
Kansas	Johnson	Westwood–Mission Woods line	471.201	758.325		US-169 north (Rainbow Boulevard)	Eastern end of US-169 overlap
Kansas–Missouri line			471.450 0.000	758.725 0.000		State Line Road	Mileposts reset; no state maintenance inside Missouri
Missouri	Jackson	Kansas City	2.948	4.744		US 71 (Bruce R. Watkins Drive)	Interchange; eastern terminus; road continues as Dr. Martin Luther King Jr. Boulevard
1.000 mi = 1.609 km; 1.000 km = 0.621 mi: Concurrency terminus; Incomplete access; Tolled

== Related routes ==
=== Herington business loop ===
U.S. Highway 56 Business
- Location: Herington, Kansas
- Existed: October 13, 1979–present

U.S. Route 56 Business (US-56 Bus.) is a short business loop through Herington, Kansas. US-56 begins at US-56 and US-77 south of Herington. At this intersection, there is no access to eastbound US-56 or northbound US-77 from US-56 Bus. and no access to US-56 Bus. from westbound US-56 or southbound US-77. US-56 Bus. heads north through flat lands with scattered trees for 1.1 miles (1.8 km) then enters Herington. The highway continues for roughly 0.55 miles (0.89 km) then curves east and becomes Trapp Street. US-56 Bus. then crosses Lime Creek as it continues through the city. After roughly 0.85 miles (1.37 km) the highway exits the city and reaches its eastern terminus at US-56 and US-77.

US-56 Bus. and US-77 Bus. was approved through Herington in a meeting on October 13, 1979. US-77 Bus. was approved to be decommissioned in a meeting on June 9, 1991, leaving just US-56 Bus..

Major intersections

The entire route is in Dickinson County.

Location	mi	km	Destinations	Notes
	0.00	0.00	US-56 west / US-77 south	Western terminus; no access to US-56 east/ US-77 north from US-56 Bus. west; no access to US-56 Bus. from US-56 west/ US-77 south
Herington	2.5	4.0	US-56 west / US-77 – Junction City, Lincolnville	Eastern terminus
	2.5	4.0	US-56 east – Council Grove	Continuation beyond eastern terminus
1.000 mi = 1.609 km; 1.000 km = 0.621 mi: Incomplete access

=== Temporary route ===
U.S. Highway 56 Temporary
- Location: Near Boise City, Oklahoma – Elkhart, Kansas
- Length: 42.9 mi (69.0 km)
- Existed: July 11, 1956–c. 1961

U.S. Route 56 Temporary (US-56 Temp.) was a 42.9-mile-long (69.0 km) temporary route of US 56 in Oklahoma. It began on modern US-56 northeast of Boise City, Oklahoma and followed US 64 and SH 3 east to SH 95. It then traveled north along SH 95 to Elkhart, Kansas. The route was approved on July 11, 1956, along existing highways, when the current routing of US-56 was being constructed. By 1962, US 56 was rerouted over SH 114, bringing it to its current diagonal path across the Oklahoma Panhandle.

Major intersections

County	Location	mi	km	Destinations	Notes
Cimarron		0.00	0.00	US 56 / US 64 / SH-3 west / SH-114 east	Transitioned to US 56 west; west end of US 64/SH-3 overlap; western terminus of SH-114
Texas		27	43	US 64 / SH-3 east / SH-95 south	East end of US 64/SH-3 overlap; west end of SH-95 overlap
Texas		41	66	SH-114 west	Eastern terminus of SH-114
Oklahoma–Kansas line		42.9	69.0	SH-95 ends US 56 east / K-27 north	Transitioned to US 56 east; eastern end of SH-95 overlap; northern terminus of SH-95; southern terminus of K-27
1.000 mi = 1.609 km; 1.000 km = 0.621 mi: Concurrency terminus; Route transition

== See also ==
- K-156 (Kansas highway)
- U.S. Route 156

Browse numbered routes
← NM 55	NM	→ NM 56
← SH-55	OK	→ SH-56
← K-55	KS	→ K-57
← I-55	MO	→ I-57
