= K-190 (Kansas highway) =

State highway in Kansas, U.S.

K-190
- K-190 highlighted in red

Route information
- Maintained by KDOT
- Length: 24.172 mi (38.901 km)
- Existed: December 22, 1954–present

Major junctions
- West end: US-160 east of Hickok
- US-56 in Satanta
- East end: US-83 / US-160 south of Sublette

Location
- Country: United States
- State: Kansas
- Counties: Grant, Haskell, Seward

Highway system
- Kansas State Highway System; Interstate; US; State; Spurs
← K-189	→ K-191

K-190 is a 24.172-mile-long (38.901 km) east–west state highway in the U.S. state of Kansas. K-190's western terminus is at U.S. Route 160 (US-160) east of the community of Hickok, and the eastern terminus is at US-83 and US-160 south of the city of Sublette. K-190 travels mostly through flat rural farmland, however it does run through the city of Satanta where it is co-designated as US-56.

K-190 was first designated as a state highway by the Kansas State Highway Commission, now known as the Kansas Department of Transportation, on December 22, 1954. The highway was fully paved the next year. The highway overlapped K-45 in Sublette until 1956, when it was redesignated as US-56. Since the highway was designated, its alignment has not changed.

== Route description ==
K-190's western terminus is at an intersection with US-160 east of Hickok. It begins traveling southward through flat rural farmland for roughly 4.5 miles (7.2 km) to an at-grade crossing with two Cimarron Valley Railroad (CVR) tracks. The highway then curves east as it passes through Ryus. K-190 then curves southeast and begins to parallel the CVR tracks as it crosses into Haskell County. The roadway continues southeast through farmland before curving south away from the railroad at County Road Ff. K-190 reaches an at-grade crossing with a CVR track then intersects US-56 at the Satanta city limits.

Here, K-190 turns northeast and begins to overlap US-56 as a four-lane highway. The two routes continue through Satanta as Nez Perce Street to the east city limit, where K-190 turns south, as US-56 continues northeast. K-190 continues south as a two-lane roadway through flat rural farmland before curving southeast and entering into Seward County. As the highway enters the county it curves back south and continues to County Road F where it curves east. K-190 continues east through rural farmland for roughly six miles (9.7 km) to its eastern terminus at US-83 and US-160.

The Kansas Department of Transportation (KDOT) tracks the traffic levels on its highways. Along K-190 in 2020, they determined that, on average, the traffic varied from 190 vehicles per day near the eastern terminus to between 1,000 and 2,500 vehicles per day along the concurrency with US-56. K-190 connects to the National Highway System at its eastern terminus with US-83 and US-160. (Note: The National Highway System is a system of highways important to the nation's defense, economy, and mobility.) The entire route is paved with partial design bituminous pavement except the section concurrent with US-56, which is composite pavement.

== History ==
On August 11, 1954, resolutions were approved that once Grant, Haskell and Seward counties had furnished a right of way of 100-foot-wide (30 m), that the road would be added to the state highway system. Haskell County finished their section by November 1, 1954, Grant County by December 6, 1954, and Seward County by December 20, 1954. Then, in a resolution approved on December 22, 1954, the road was designated as K-190 and added to the state highway system. In February 1955, the SHC announced it would accept bids to pave the entire length of K-190. That next month, the SHC announced that Popejoy Construction Company of Ulysses would be the contractors on the project. When the highway was first designated, it overlapped K-45 in Satanta. Then, on June 27, 1956, the American Association of State Highway and Transportation Officials approved US-56, which replaced K-45 through the city. On April 9, 1975, a truck collided with a Santa Fe freight train at the crossing in Ryus, killing the driver of the truck.

== Major intersections ==
County	Location	mi	km	Destinations	Notes
Grant	Sullivan Township–Sherman Township line	0.000	0.000	US-160 (East Oklahoma Avenue) to US-83 – Ulysses	Western terminus
Haskell	Satanta	12.290	19.779	US-56 west (Nez Perce Street) – Hugoton	Western terminus of US 56 concurrency
Haskell	Satanta	13.370	21.517	US-56 east (Nez Perce Street) – Sublette	Eastern terminus of US 56 concurrency
Seward	Seward Township	24.172	38.901	US-83 / US-160 – Liberal, Meade, Sublette	Eastern terminus
1.000 mi = 1.609 km; 1.000 km = 0.621 mi: Concurrency terminus
