= Edward Brandt =

Edward Brandt may refer to:

- Edward Brandt Jr. (1933–2007), American physician, mathematician, and public health administrator
- Edward R. Brandt (1931–2013), American politician and foreign service officer
