= Dudley Township =

Dudley Township may refer to:

- Dudley Township, Henry County, Indiana
- Dudley Township, Haskell County, Kansas
- Dudley Township, Ohio
- Dudley Township, Clearwater County, Minnesota
