= Ted Trimpa =

American political strategist

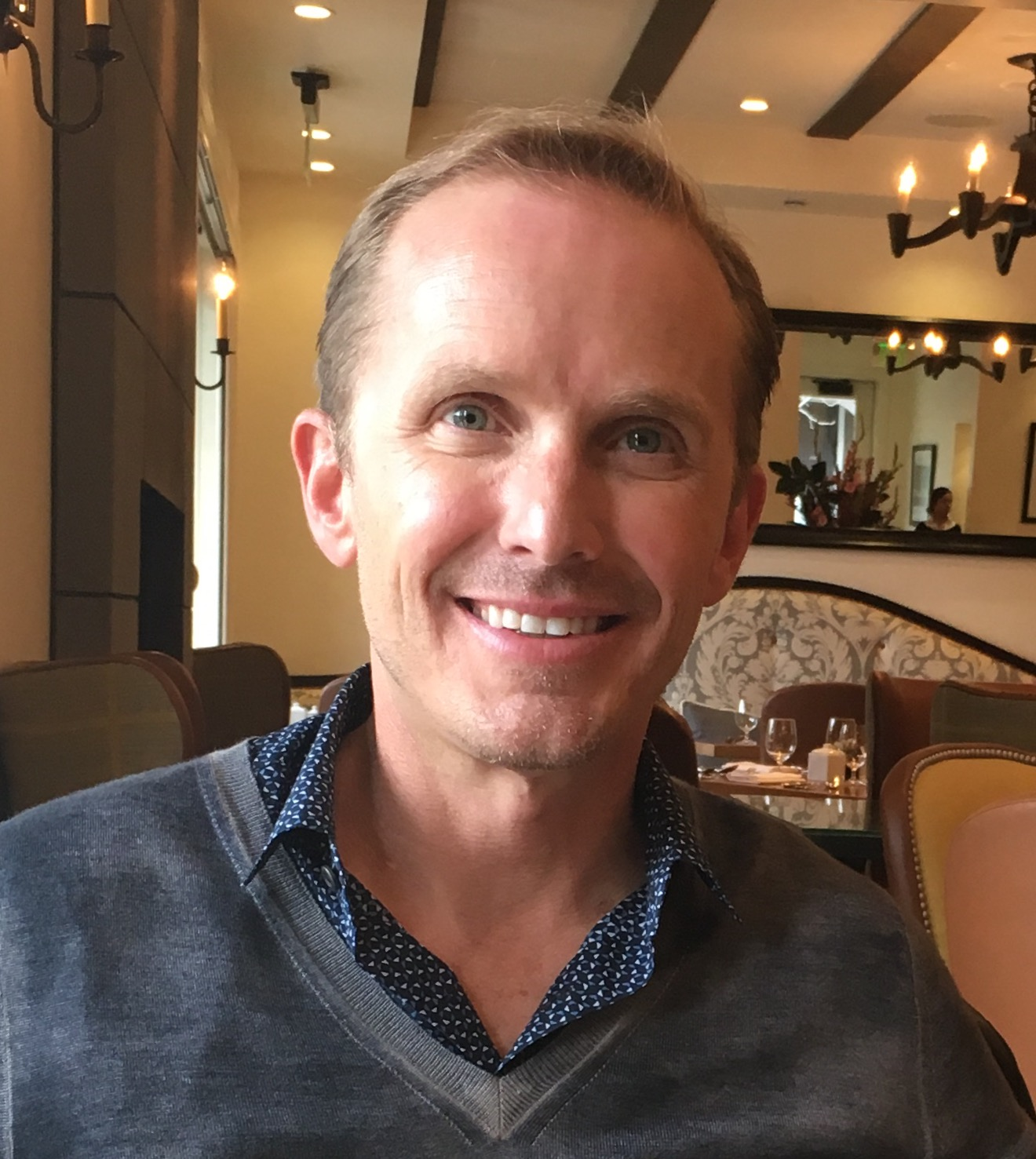
- Trimpa in Yountville, California in 2016.
- Born: Ted Jefferson Trimpa; February 12, 1967 (age 59); Sublette, Kansas, U.S.
- Education: University of Denver (BA, JD)
- Occupations: Democratic strategist & political consultant
- Years active: 1989-present
- Political party: Democratic
- Partner: Arash Mosaleh
- Website: Trimpa Group

Ted Jefferson Trimpa (born February 12, 1967) is a Democratic strategist, lobbyist and political consultant based in Denver, Colorado. He is the founder and CEO of Trimpa Group, a consulting firm. He serves or has served as a board member for a number of progressive organizations, including the Democracy Alliance, ProgressNow, Third Way and the Citizen Engagement Laboratory. Trimpa serves on the board of Tectonic Theater Project, a New York City-based theater group known for The Laramie Project and 33 Variations.

== Career ==
Trimpa is an attorney and political strategist. He received his B.A. and his Juris Doctor degree from the University of Denver. In 2010, Trimpa founded Trimpa Group, a political consulting and government relations firm specializing in progressive policy advocacy and political strategy at the state and federal levels. Trimpa Group has offices in Washington D.C. and Denver, Colorado.

From 2008 to 2010, Trimpa was a partner at Hogan Lovells and, prior to that, an equity shareholder at Brownstein Hyatt Farber Schreck where he was a member of the government relations group for more than ten years. He practiced federal, state, and local legislative law, with a special concentration on public policy, political strategy and political participation. Trimpa's political start was as a legislative aide for U.S. Senator Nancy Kassebaum Baker.

Trimpa advises a number of progressive donors, including LGBT donors. In 2006, Trimpa helped form the Gill Action Fund and developed a strategy to invest in state and local political races to identify candidates that were "building their careers on antigay policies." Trimpa also advises donors regarding marijuana legalization at the state level and coined the phrase "weed is the new gay." He is also involved in efforts to have states adopt a national popular vote for President of the United States of America.

Trimpa is active in Colorado politics and has been described as "one of the most important players in Colorado politics that you've probably never heard of." In 2008, he brokered an agreement between business and labor, where labor agreed to withdraw four ballot measures opposed by the Colorado business community and 75 Colorado CEOs agreed to publicly oppose right to work and payroll deduction measures. He also brought together environmentalists and natural gas companies to pass legislation on health-based emission standards for power plants. In 2011, Trimpa was recognized as one of the top five Democratic influencers in Colorado, alongside John Hickenlooper, Tim Gill, Craig Hughes and Mike Melanson.

Trimpa took this model for social change and applied it to U.S. foreign policy. Trimpa and the Trimpa Group developed the political strategy and advocacy campaign that supported the political environment for President Obama to issue his executive order that began the normalization of relations between the United States and Cuba.

== Political philosophy ==
Many of Trimpa's efforts have focused on state-level political and policy changes to "create the underlying environment of legal and political momentum." Trimpa has said "[w]e should be spending resources and time and effort in states to create an understanding and change over time. Most major social movements didn't start inside the beltway. The change has to start at the states." Active in developing "the Colorado Model," has helped drive the effort to replicate this model in other states to target close races.

Trimpa has been referred to as "Colorado's answer to Karl Rove" by The Atlantic and was a key architect in the Democrats' takeover of the Colorado statehouse in 2004 and 2006. Trimpa attributed this success to participating at the highest levels to set strategies and tactics with like-minded allies and overlaying a strategy to target elected officials based on their anti-progressive views, actions, and statements.

He has been outspoken about the need for advocates to support candidates that exercise leadership on LGBT issues and emphasizes the need for money to be concentrated for maximum impact. One Colorado, the state's leading advocacy organization for LGBTQ Coloradans and their families, honored Trimpa with its Lifetime Achievement Award in 2016.

Trimpa emphasizes that gay equality will not come without Republican support. John Podesta, former White House Chief of Staff to President Clinton, called Trimpa "a problem solver with a proven record." Former Republican Governor Bill Owens said Trimpa has "integrity and boundless energy."

== Personal life ==
Trimpa was raised on a family farm in Sublette, Kansas, and splits his time between Denver, Colorado, and New York City.
