= U.S. Route 160 in Kansas =

Highway in Kansas

U.S. Highway 160
- US-160 highlighted in red

Route information
- Maintained by KDOT and the cities of Ulysses, Harper and Wellington
- Length: 489.457 mi (787.705 km)
- Existed: c. 1931–present

Major junctions
- West end: US 160 at the Colorado state line near Manter
- US-83 west of Sublette; US-56 west of Sublette; US-54 from Plains to Meade; US-281 in Medicine Lodge; US-81 in Wellington; I-35 / Kansas Turnpike; US-77 in Winfield; US-75 in Independence; US-59 in Oswego; US-69 / US-400 in Pittsburg
- East end: US 160 at the Missouri state line in Mindenmines, MO

Location
- Country: United States
- State: Kansas
- Counties: Stanton, Grant, Haskell, Seward, Meade, Clark, Comanche, Barber, Harper, Sumner, Cowley, Elk, Montgomery, Labette, Cherokee, Crawford

Highway system
- United States Numbered Highway System; List; Special; Divided; Kansas State Highway System; Interstate; US; State; Spurs
← K-158	→ K-161

U.S. Route 160 (US-160) is a part of the U.S. Highway System that runs from US-89 near Tuba City, Arizona east to US-67 and Missouri Route 158 southwest of Poplar Bluff, Missouri. In the state of Kansas, US-160 is a main east–west highway that runs from the Colorado border east to the Missouri border.

== Route description ==
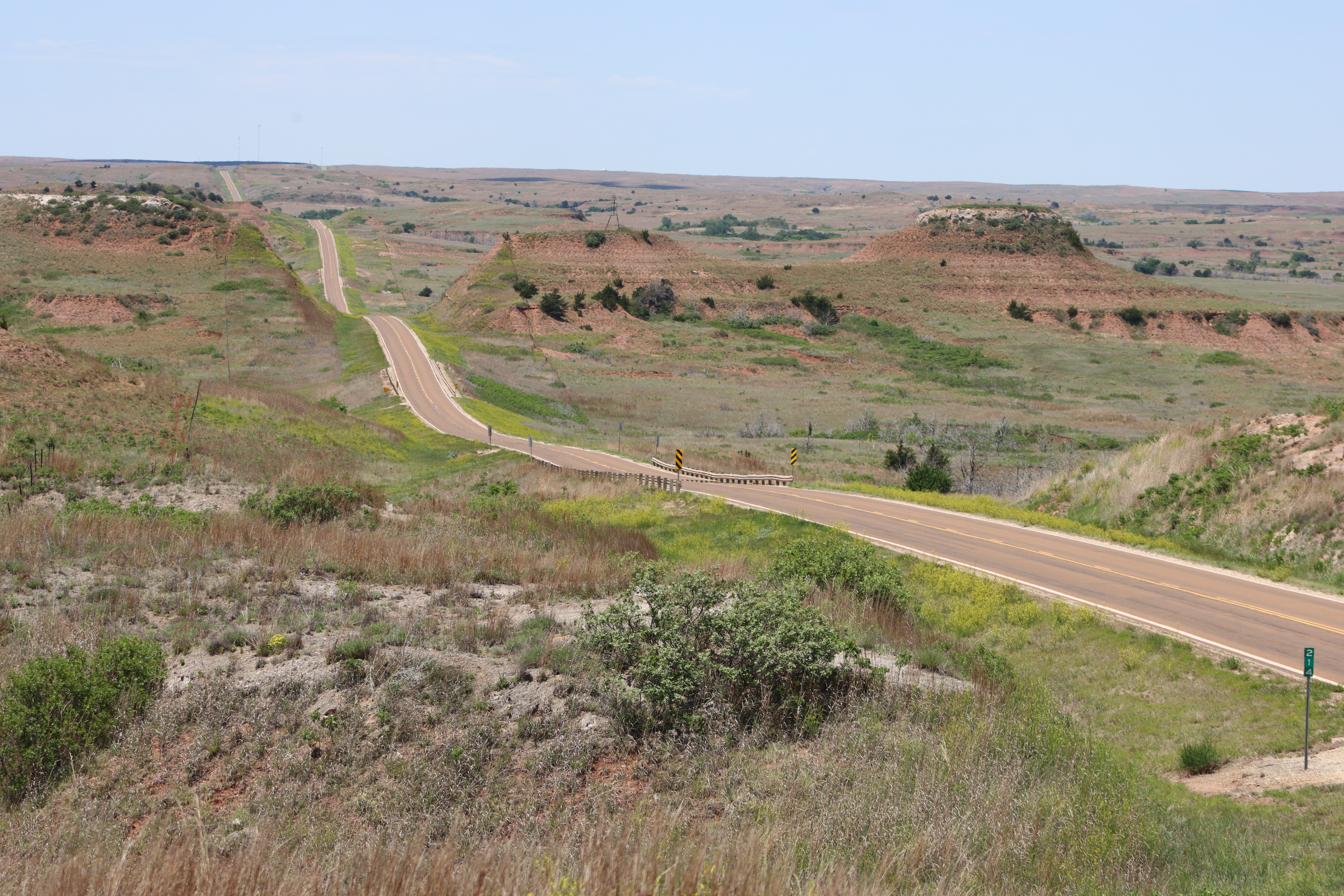
US Route 160 traversing the Red Hills

US-160 enters Kansas just west of Saunders. It goes northeast to Johnson City, then turns east to go through Ulysses. Near Sublette, it intersects U.S. Route 83 and runs concurrently southward past its intersection with U.S. Route 56. It turns east and then runs concurrently with U.S. Route 54 between Plains and Meade. It continues east, and runs concurrently with U.S. Route 283 and U.S. Route 183. At Medicine Lodge, it intersects U.S. Route 281. It continues east and at Wellington, intersects U.S. Route 81 and then Interstate 35, on which the Kansas Turnpike is routed in the area.

East of Interstate 35, it intersects U.S. Route 77 in Winfield. It goes east from Winfield, then turns north to Burden, then goes east before going south to Elk City. It then turns east and goes through Independence after being concurrent with U.S. Route 75. It continues east, is briefly concurrent with U.S. Route 169 and then intersects U.S. Route 59 at Altamont. US-160 and US-59 then go into Oswego and separate. At Columbus, US-160 begins a concurrency with U.S. Route 69, which goes east to Crestline, then north to Frontenac, Kansas. Also at Crestline, it picks up a second concurrency with U.S. Route 400, which goes north and ends just south of Pittsburg, Kansas. After Frontenac, it turns east and enters Missouri.

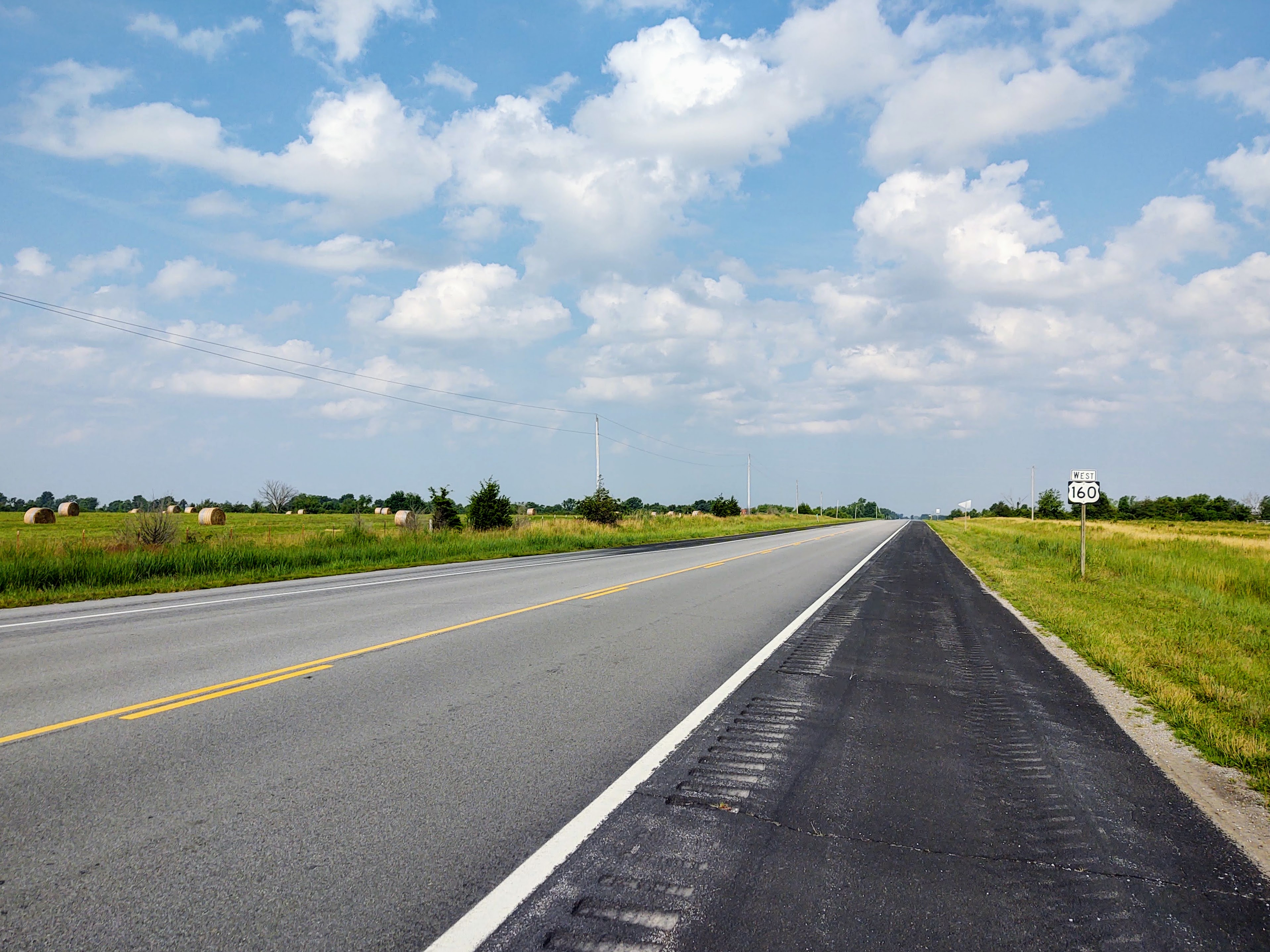
The first westbound US 160 reassurance marker in Kansas

The section of US-160 in Harper, from K-14 to slightly east of end of overlap with K-2 is maintained by the city. The entire 2.601-mile (4.186 km) section within Wellington is maintained by the city.

== History ==
K-46
- Location: Colorado border–Santa Fe
- Existed: 1927–c. 1931

The section of US-160 from the Colorado border to Santa Fe was established in 1927 as K-46. The section from K-22, now US-83, south of Sublette east to Pittsburg was established in 1927 as K-12. US-160 was extended into Kansas between 1930 and 1931, which resulted in K-46 being decommissioned and K-12 being truncated to US-54 north of Liberal.

East of Coldwater, US-160 originally turned north to Wilmore then curved southwest and traveled through Sun City and Lake City to its current alignment west of Medicine Lodge. Then between 1941 and 1944, a new alignment was built to travel directly east–west from Coldwater to Medicine Lodge. East of Independence, US-160 originally followed US-169 north to K-37 then east to US-400, which it followed to its current alignment south of Pittsburg. Then in a December 9, 1998 resolution, US-160 was realigned over K-96 from US-169 east to US-69 Alternate then turned north toward Pittsburg.

Between 1951 and 1952, the alignment was shifted south between the Colorado border and Johnson.

== Major intersections ==
County	Location	mi	km	Destinations	Notes
Stanton		0.000	0.000	US 160 west	Continuation into Colorado
Stanton		16.816	27.063	K-27 south	Western end of K-27 overlap
Stanton		17.823	28.683	K-27 north	Eastern end of K-27 overlap
Grant	Ulysses	39.700	63.891	K-25	
Grant		53.880	86.711	K-190 south	Northern terminus of K-190
Haskell		66.931	107.715	US-83 north / K-144 east	Western end of US-83 overlap; western terminus of K-144
Haskell		72.950	117.402	US-56	
Seward		79.944	128.657	K-190 north	Southern terminus of K-190
Seward		86.967	139.960	US-83 south	Eastern end of US-83 overlap
Meade	Plains	103.660	166.825	US-54 west	Western end of US-54 overlap
Meade	Meade	116.556	187.579	K-23	
Meade	Meade	117.882	189.713	US-54 east	Eastern end of US-54 overlap
Clark		135.261	217.681	US-283 north – Dodge City, Minneola	Western end of US-283 overlap
Clark		141.842	228.273	US-283 south – Englewood	Eastern end of US-283 overlap
Clark		160.031	257.545	US-183 south / K-34 north	Western end of US-183 overlap; southern terminus of K-34
Comanche		177.978	286.428	K-1 south	Northern terminus of K-1
Comanche		183.928	296.003	US-183 north	Eastern end of US-183 overlap
Barber		224.293	360.965	US-281 south – Alva, OK	Western end of US-281 overlap
Barber	Medicine Lodge	224.920	361.974	US-281 north – Pratt	Eastern end of US-281 overlap
Harper		256.218	412.343	K-2 west	Western end of K-2 overlap
Harper		259.233	417.195	K-14 north	Southern terminus of K-14
Harper		260.345	418.985	K-2 east	Eastern end of K-2 overlap
Sumner		279.725	450.174	Milan Road – Milan	Northern terminus of former K-205
Sumner		281.711	453.370	K-49 north	Western end of K-49 overlap
Sumner		284.644	458.090	K-49 south	Eastern end of K-49 overlap
Sumner		286.626	461.280	Mayfield Road – Mayfield	Northern terminus of former K-271
Sumner	Wellington	294.838	474.496	US-81 south	West end of US-81 overlap
Sumner	Wellington	295.440	475.465	North Washington Avenue – Business District	Former routing of US-81
Sumner	Wellington	295.703	475.888	US-81 north (North A Street) – Wichita	East end of US-81 overlap; roundabout
Sumner		298.713	480.732	I-35 / Kansas Turnpike	I-35/Kansas Turnpike exit 19
Cowley	Winfield	318.339	512.317	US-77 / K-15 north	Western end of K-15 overlap
Cowley		320.951	516.521	K-360	
Cowley		330.892	532.519	K-15 south	Eastern end of K-15 overlap
Elk		364.045	585.874	K-99 south	Western end of K-99 overlap
Elk		364.609	586.781	K-99 north	Eastern end of K-99 overlap
Montgomery		402.003	646.961	US-75 south	Western end of US-75 overlap
Montgomery	Independence	405.023	651.821	US-75 north	Eastern end of US-75 overlap
Montgomery		411.963	662.990	US-169 north	Western end of US-169 overlap
Montgomery		412.966	664.604	US-169 south	Eastern end of US-169 overlap
Labette		423.656	681.808	Hickory Street – Mound Valley	Southern terminus of former K-222
Labette		426.487	686.364	K-101 south	Northern terminus of K-101
Labette		431.485	694.408	US-59 north	Western end of US-59 overlap
Labette	Oswego	441.343	710.273	US-59 south	Eastern end of US-59 overlap
Cherokee		456.821	735.182	K-7 / US-69 south	Western end of US-69 overlap
Cherokee		463.842	746.481	US-400 east / US 69 Alt. south	Western end of US-400 overlap; northern terminus of US-69 Alternate
Cherokee		472.960	761.155	K-103 west	Eastern terminus of K-103
Cherokee–Crawford county line		474.927	764.321	US-400 west / K-171 east	Eastern end of US-400 overlap; western terminus of K-171
Crawford	Pittsburg	477.953	769.191	US 69 Bus. north	Southern terminus of US-69 Business
Crawford	Pittsburg	480.278	772.933	K-126	
Crawford	Pittsburg	482.607	776.681	US 69 Bus. south	Northern terminus of US-69 Business
Crawford	Frontenac	484.617	779.915	US-69 north	Eastern end of US-69 overlap
Crawford		489.457	787.705	US 160 east	Continuation into Missouri
1.000 mi = 1.609 km; 1.000 km = 0.621 mi: Concurrency terminus; Tolled

U.S. Route 160
Previous state: Colorado	Kansas	Next state: Missouri
