= Edward R. Brandt =

American politician

Edward R. Brandt (November 17, 1931 – January 17, 2013) was an American politician and foreign service officer.

Born in Satanta, Kansas, Brandt was raised in a Mennonite family. He received his bachelor's and doctorate degrees from University of Minnesota and his master's degree from George Washington University. Brandt worked for the United States Information Agency from 1958 to 1968. Brandt lived in Minneapolis, Minnesota and served in the Minnesota House of Representatives from 1969 to 1973, and was a Republican. He was a member of the Conservative Caucus. Brandt later taught at the University of St. Thomas.
