= Dudley Township, Kansas =

Dudley Township
- Township
- Location in Haskell County
- Coordinates: 37°33′15″N 101°00′32″W
- Country: United States
- State: Kansas
- County: Haskell

Area
  - Total: 192.79 sq mi (499.32 km^{2})
  - Land: 192.74 sq mi (499.19 km^{2})
  - Water: 0.050 sq mi (0.13 km^{2}) 0.03%
- Elevation: 2,969 ft (905 m)

Population (2020)
  - Total: 1,435
  - Density: 7.445/sq mi (2.875/km^{2})
- GNIS feature ID: 0470613

Dudley Township is a township in Haskell County, Kansas, United States. As of the 2020 census, its population was 1,435.

== Geography ==
Dudley Township covers an area of 192.79 square miles (499.3 km^{2}) and contains one incorporated settlement, Satanta. According to the USGS, it contains two cemeteries: Canaan and Dudley.

== Transportation ==
Dudley Township contains one airport or landing strip, Master Feeders Eleven Incorporated Airport.
