= U.S. Route 83 in Kansas =

Segment of American highway

U.S. Highway 83
- US-83 highlighted in red

Route information
- Maintained by KDOT
- Length: 227.50 mi (366.13 km)
- Existed: c. 1931–present

Major junctions
- South end: US 83 / US 270 at the Oklahoma state line
- US-54 / US-270 in Liberal; US-160 near Liberal; US-56 southwest of Sublette; US-160 / K-144 near Plains; US-50 / US-400 in Garden City; US-40 in Oakley; I-70 near Oakley; US-24 near Gem; US-36 in Oberlin
- North end: US 83 at the Nebraska state line

Location
- Country: United States
- State: Kansas
- Counties: Seward, Haskell, Finney, Scott, Logan, Thomas, Sheridan, Decatur

Highway system
- United States Numbered Highway System; List; Special; Divided; Kansas State Highway System; Interstate; US; State; Spurs
← K-82	→ K-84
← K-22	K-22	→ K-22

U.S. Route 83 (US-83) is a part of the U.S. Highway System that runs from the Veterans International Bridge in Brownsville, Texas north to the Canadian border, north of Westhope, North Dakota, where it continues as Manitoba Highway 83. In the U.S. state of Kansas, US-83 is a main north–south highway that runs from the Oklahoma border north to the Nebraska border.

In 1926, the highway that first became known as US-83 was established as K-22. Then between 1930 and 1931, US-83 was extended into Kansas along K-22, which was decommissioned. Then between 1941 and 1944, US-83 and US-183 were swapped within Nebraska and a small portion into Kansas. US-83 was changed to turn north just northeast of Selden and the former alignment of US-83 from northeast of Selden to US-183 east of Woodruff became US-383, now K-383.

== Route description ==
US-83 enters the Sunflower State, overlapped with US-270 in Seward County, approximately four miles (6.4 km) south of Liberal. From here it continues north to Liberal where it intersects US-54 and US-270 ends. North of Liberal, US-83 begins a concurrency with US-160, and the highways remain joined until reaching Sublette, the seat of Haskell County. US-83 and US-160 split north of Sublette; US-160 heads west toward Ulysses, and US-83 continues north toward Garden City.

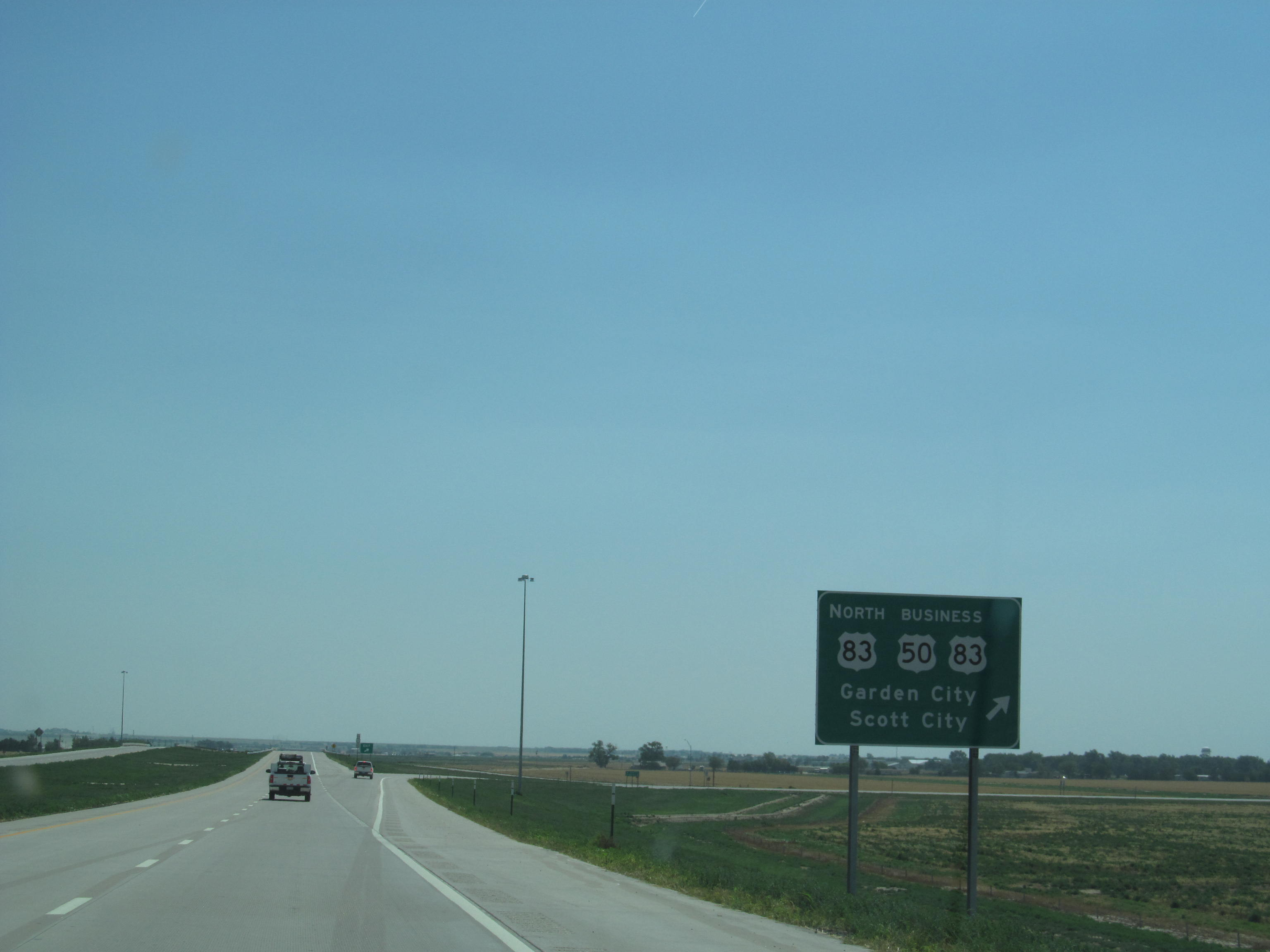
US-50 and US-400 westbound approaching northern end of US-83 overlap

At Garden City, US-50 and US-400 join US-83 for a brief concurrency on a bypass around the east and north sides of the city while US-83 Business follows the former routing through downtown. All three routes cross K-156, also known as Kansas Avenue, in the northwest portion of the city. At the north end of the US-50/US-83 Business route, US-83 splits and heads north toward Scott City, while US-50 and US-400 remain joined through the rest of the state. The highway passes through largely unpopulated areas of Finney County and Scott County before reaching a junction with K-96 in downtown Scott City.

In northern Scott County, K-4 has its origins at US-83, heading east toward Healy, and US-83 traverses through rolling farmlands until reaching Oakley, the seat of Logan County. US-83 reaches US-40 less than a mile west of I-70, and the two highways jog west for a brief multiplex before US-83 splits and crosses I-70.

North of I-70, US-83 intersects US-24 then curves northeast, east of Gem in Thomas County. US-83 continues its northeasterly track through Rexford and Selden. After passing through Selden, US-83 intersects the southern terminus of K-383 and the northern terminus of K-23. From here, US-83 turns north, crosses into Decatur County then continues north and intersects US-36 in Oberlin. Oberlin is the last area of significant population the highway passes in Kansas; the next city is McCook, Nebraska.

== History ==
K-22
- Existed: 1926–c. 1931

In 1926, the highway that first became known as US-83 was established as K-22. Then between 1930 and 1931, US-83 was extended into Kansas along K-22, which was decommissioned. Between July 1938 and 1939, US-183 was altered to follow US-36 east to K-1 in Phillipsburg, which created a short overlap between US-83 and US-183 near Norton. Then between 1941 and 1944, US-183 and US-83 were swapped within Nebraska and a small portion into Kansas. US-83 was changed to turn north just northeast of Selden and US-183 was changed to continue north past Phillipsburg, which eliminated the overlap between the two in Norton. The former alignment of US-83 from northeast of Selden to east of Woodruff became US-383, now K-383.

In a July 2010 study, US-83 was planned to be reconstructed from Sublette to Scott City and included a diamond interchange to be built at the K-144 intersection. In February 2016, KDOT accepted a bid of $22.3 million (equivalent to $29.9 million in 2025) to convert the junction with K-144 to a diamond interchange as well as reconstruct a 6-mile (9.7 km) section of US-83. On June 26, 2017, K-144 was closed and on June 27, 2017, US-160 was closed from K-190 east to US-83 and K-144. On September 20, 2017, US-160 and K-144 reopened, with only minor work remaining to complete the entire project.

== Major junctions ==
County	Location	mi	km	Destinations	Notes
Seward		0.000	0.000	US 83 south / US 270 east – Perryton TX	Continuation into Oklahoma
Seward	Liberal	3.116	5.015	US-270 ends US-54 – Meade, Guymon OK	Western terminus of US-270; northern end of US-270 overlap
Seward		12.785	20.575	K-51 west	Eastern terminus of K-51
Seward		21.627	34.805	US-160 east (Road 20) – Meade	Southern end of US-160 overlap
Seward		28.650	46.108	K-190 west	Eastern terminus of K-190
Haskell		35.644	57.363	US-56	
Haskell		41.663	67.050	US-160 west / K-144 – Ulysses	Interchange; northern end of US-160 overlap; western terminus of K-144
Finney				US 83 Bus. north – Garden City	Southern terminus of US-83 Bus.
Finney	Garden City			US 50 Bus. west – Garden City US-50 east / US-400 east – Dodge City	Interchange; southern end of US-50 and US-400 overlap; eastern terminus of US-50 Bus.; US-50/US-400 east serves Garden City Regional Airport
Finney	Garden City			K-156 (Kansas Avenue) / Mary Street	Interchange; K-156 is former US-156
Finney				US-50 west / US-400 west – Lakin US 50 Bus. east / US 83 Bus. south – Garden City	Interchange; northern end of US-50 and US-400 overlap; western terminus of US-50 Bus.; northern terminus of US-83 Bus.
Scott	Scott City			K-96 (5th Street)	
Scott				K-4 east	Western terminus of K-4
Scott				K-95 north	Southern terminus of K-95
Scott				K-95 south	Northern terminus of K-95
Logan	Oakley			US-40 east	Southern end of US-40 overlap
Logan	Oakley			US-40 west – Sharon Springs	Northern end of US-40 overlap
Thomas				I-70 – Hays, Denver	I-70 exit 70; diamond interchange
Thomas				US-24	
Sheridan				K-23 south – Hoxie K-383 north – Norton	Northern terminus of K-23; southern terminus of K-383 (former US-383)
Decatur	Oberlin			US-36	
40th parallel north				US 83 north / EE Lane (Road 702) – McCook	Kansas–Nebraska line; US 83 continues into Nebraska
1.000 mi = 1.609 km; 1.000 km = 0.621 mi: Concurrency terminus

== Business route ==
U.S. Highway 83 Business
- Location: Garden City

U.S. Route 83 Business (US-83 Bus.) is a business route in Garden City. It begins at US-83 and travels north and ends at US-50, US-83, and US-400.

=== Major intersections ===
The entire route is in Finney County.

Location	mi	km	Destinations	Notes
	0.00	0.00	US-83 – Liberal	Southern terminus of US-83 Bus.
Garden City			US 50 Bus. east (Fulton Street)	Southern end of US-50 Bus. overlap
Garden City			K-156 east (Kansas Avenue east)	Western terminus of K-156; former US-156
			US 50 Bus. ends US-83 / US-400 / US-50 – Scott City, Lakin, Dodge City	Interchange; northern end of US-50 Bus. overlap; western terminus of US-50 Bus.; northern terminus of US-83 Bus.; highway continues as US-83 north
1.000 mi = 1.609 km; 1.000 km = 0.621 mi: Concurrency terminus

U.S. Route 83
Previous state: Oklahoma	Kansas	Next state: Nebraska
