= Lockport Township, Kansas =

Lockport Township
- Township
- Location in Haskell County
- Coordinates: 37°34′45″N 100°43′02″W
- Country: United States
- State: Kansas
- County: Haskell

Area
  - Total: 192.44 sq mi (498.42 km^{2})
  - Land: 192.26 sq mi (497.96 km^{2})
  - Water: 0.18 sq mi (0.46 km^{2}) 0.09%
- Elevation: 2,877 ft (877 m)

Population (2020)
  - Total: 465
  - Density: 2.42/sq mi (0.934/km^{2})
- GNIS feature ID: 0485197

Lockport Township is a township in Haskell County, Kansas, United States. As of the 2020 census, its population was 465.

== Geography ==
Lockport Township covers an area of 192.44 square miles (498.4 km^{2}) and contains no incorporated settlements. According to the USGS, it contains one cemetery, Colusa.
