= Cimarron Valley Railroad =

Railway in Kansas, U.S.

Overview
- Headquarters: Satanta, Kansas
- Reporting mark: CVR
- Locale: Kansas
- Dates of operation: 1996–present

Technical
- Track gauge: 4 ft 8 1/2 in (1,435 mm) standard gauge
- Length: 254 miles (409 kilometres)

The Cimarron Valley Railroad (reporting mark CVR) was formed May 29, 1996 in Utah, United States. In that year it purchased from what was then Burlington Northern Santa Fe Railway (now BNSF Railway) trackage built c. 1912, being the former C.V. and Manter Subdivisions of the Atchison, Topeka and Santa Fe Railway tracks in Oklahoma, Colorado and Kansas. One line runs from Dodge City, Kansas, to Boise City, Oklahoma, the other from Satanta, Kansas, to Springfield, Colorado. The CVR runs a total of 254 miles of track primarily hauling agricultural commodities (such as wheat, corn, and milo), along with sand, cement, poles, pipe, and fertilizers. CVR was one of several short-line railroads operated by The Western Group of Ogden, Utah.

As of November 2009, the Kansas Department of Transportation and partners were planning a renovation and upgrade of the line.

On November 1, 2020, the CVR was purchased by Jaguar Transport Holdings.
