= Haskell Township, Kansas =

Haskell Township
- Township
- Location in Haskell County
- Coordinates: 37°34′00″N 100°52′22″W
- Country: United States
- State: Kansas
- County: Haskell

Area
  - Total: 192.50 sq mi (498.56 km^{2})
  - Land: 192.36 sq mi (498.22 km^{2})
  - Water: 0.13 sq mi (0.34 km^{2}) 0.07%
- Elevation: 2,943 ft (897 m)

Population (2020)
  - Total: 1,880
  - Density: 9.77/sq mi (3.77/km^{2})
- GNIS feature ID: 0470608

Haskell Township is a township in Haskell County, Kansas, United States. As of the 2020 census, its population was 1,880.

== Geography ==
Haskell Township covers an area of 192.5 square miles (499 km^{2}) and contains one incorporated settlement, Sublette (the county seat). According to the USGS, it contains two cemeteries: Haskell and Ivanhoe.

== Transportation ==
Haskell Township contains two airports or landing strips: Currey Farms Airport and Sublette Flying Club Land Strip.
