= Satanta, Kansas =

City in Haskell County, Kansas

- City
- Location within Haskell County and Kansas

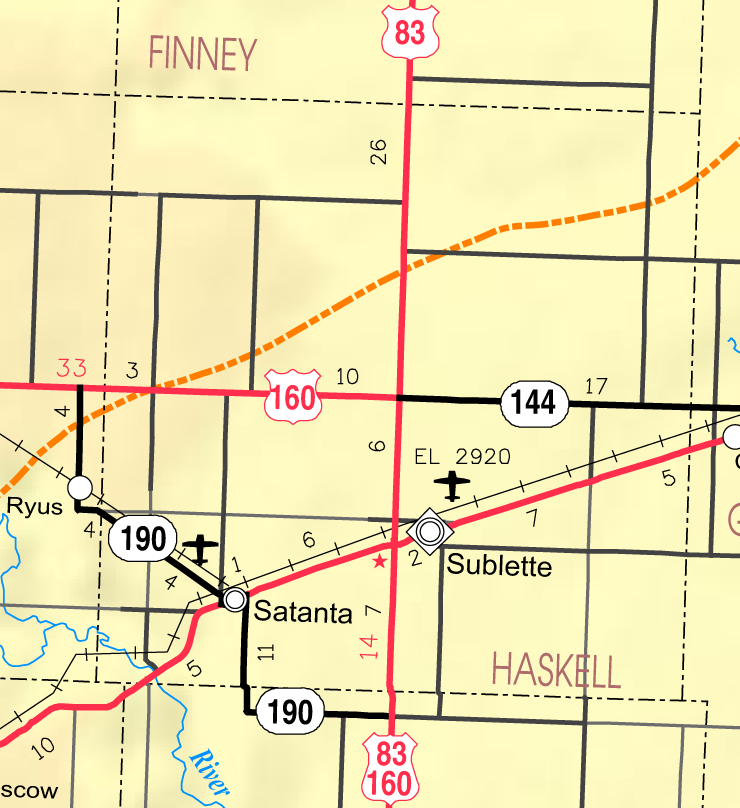
- KDOT map of Haskell County (legend)
- Coordinates: 37°26′12″N 100°59′15″W
- Country: United States
- State: Kansas
- County: Haskell
- Founded: 1910s
- Incorporated: 1929
- Named for: Chief Satanta

Area
  - Total: 0.61 sq mi (1.58 km^{2})
  - Land: 0.61 sq mi (1.58 km^{2})
  - Water: 0 sq mi (0.00 km^{2})
- Elevation: 2,953 ft (900 m)

Population (2020)
  - Total: 1,092
  - Density: 1,790/sq mi (691/km^{2})
- Time zone: UTC-6 (CST)
  - Summer (DST): UTC-5 (CDT)
- ZIP Code: 67870
- Area code: 620
- FIPS code: 20-63150
- GNIS ID: 484330
- Website: cityofsatanta.com

Satanta is a city in Haskell County, Kansas, United States. As of the 2020 census, the population of the city was 1,092. Every year there is a celebration of Satanta's Indian heritage called Satanta Day.

== History ==
The town is named after Kiowa Chief Satanta.

The first post office in Satanta was established in October 1912.

== Geography ==
Satanta is located at 37°26′12″N 100°59′15″W (37.436602, -100.987509). According to the United States Census Bureau, the city has a total area of 0.59 square miles (1.53 km^{2}), all land.

=== Climate ===
According to the Köppen Climate Classification system, Satanta has a semi-arid climate, abbreviated "BSk" on climate maps.

== Demographics ==
Historical population
Census	Pop.	Note	%±
1930	508		—
1940	345		−32.1%
1950	667		93.3%
1960	686		2.8%
1970	1,161		69.2%
1980	1,117		−3.8%
1990	1,073		−3.9%
2000	1,239		15.5%
2010	1,133		−8.6%
2020	1,092		−3.6%
U.S. Decennial Census

=== 2010 census ===
As of the census of 2010, there were 1,133 people, 424 households, and 294 families residing in the city. The population density was 1,920.3 inhabitants per square mile (741.4/km^{2}). There were 460 housing units at an average density of 779.7 per square mile (301.0/km^{2}). The racial makeup of the city was 81.6% White, 0.8% African American, 0.7% Native American, 0.8% Asian, 12.8% from other races, and 3.3% from two or more races. Hispanic or Latino of any race were 35.1% of the population.

There were 424 households, of which 35.1% had children under the age of 18 living with them, 59.4% were married couples living together, 6.6% had a female householder with no husband present, 3.3% had a male householder with no wife present, and 30.7% were non-families. 27.4% of all households were made up of individuals, and 11.4% had someone living alone who was 65 years of age or older. The average household size was 2.60 and the average family size was 3.19.

The median age in the city was 37 years. 29% of residents were under the age of 18; 7% were between the ages of 18 and 24; 22.2% were from 25 to 44; 26.9% were from 45 to 64; and 14.7% were 65 years of age or older. The gender makeup of the city was 49.2% male and 50.8% female.

=== 2000 census ===
As of the census of 2000, there were 1,239 people, 431 households, and 324 families residing in the city. The population density was 2,664.4 inhabitants per square mile (1,028.7/km^{2}). There were 470 housing units at an average density of 1,010.7 per square mile (390.2/km^{2}). The racial makeup of the city was 82.57% White, 0.40% African American, 0.65% Native American, 0.97% Asian, 12.91% from other races, and 2.50% from two or more races. Hispanic or Latino of any race were 29.94% of the population.

There were 431 households, out of which 40.4% had children under the age of 18 living with them, 66.4% were married couples living together, 7.0% had a female householder with no husband present, and 24.8% were non-families. 22.3% of all households were made up of individuals, and 8.8% had someone living alone who was 65 years of age or older. The average household size was 2.80 and the average family size was 3.33.

In the city, the population was spread out, with 31.3% under the age of 18, 7.4% from 18 to 24, 27.4% from 25 to 44, 20.6% from 45 to 64, and 13.2% who were 65 years of age or older. The median age was 34 years. For every 100 females, there were 100.2 males. For every 100 females age 18 and over, there were 95.2 males.

The median income for a household in the city was $35,139, and the median income for a family was $41,750. Males had a median income of $30,846 versus $19,875 for females. The per capita income for the city was $15,392. About 9.9% of families and 13.4% of the population were below the poverty line, including 12.5% of those under age 18 and 17.9% of those age 65 or over.

== Education ==
The community is served by Satanta USD 507 public school district.

The Satanta Indians won the Kansas State High School boys class B Track & Field championship in 1958.

== Notable people ==
- Edward Brandt, Minnesota state legislator, was born in Satanta.
- Gary Spani, professional football player, Kansas City Chiefs, was born in Satanta.
