= Haskell County, Kansas =

County in Kansas, United States

- County
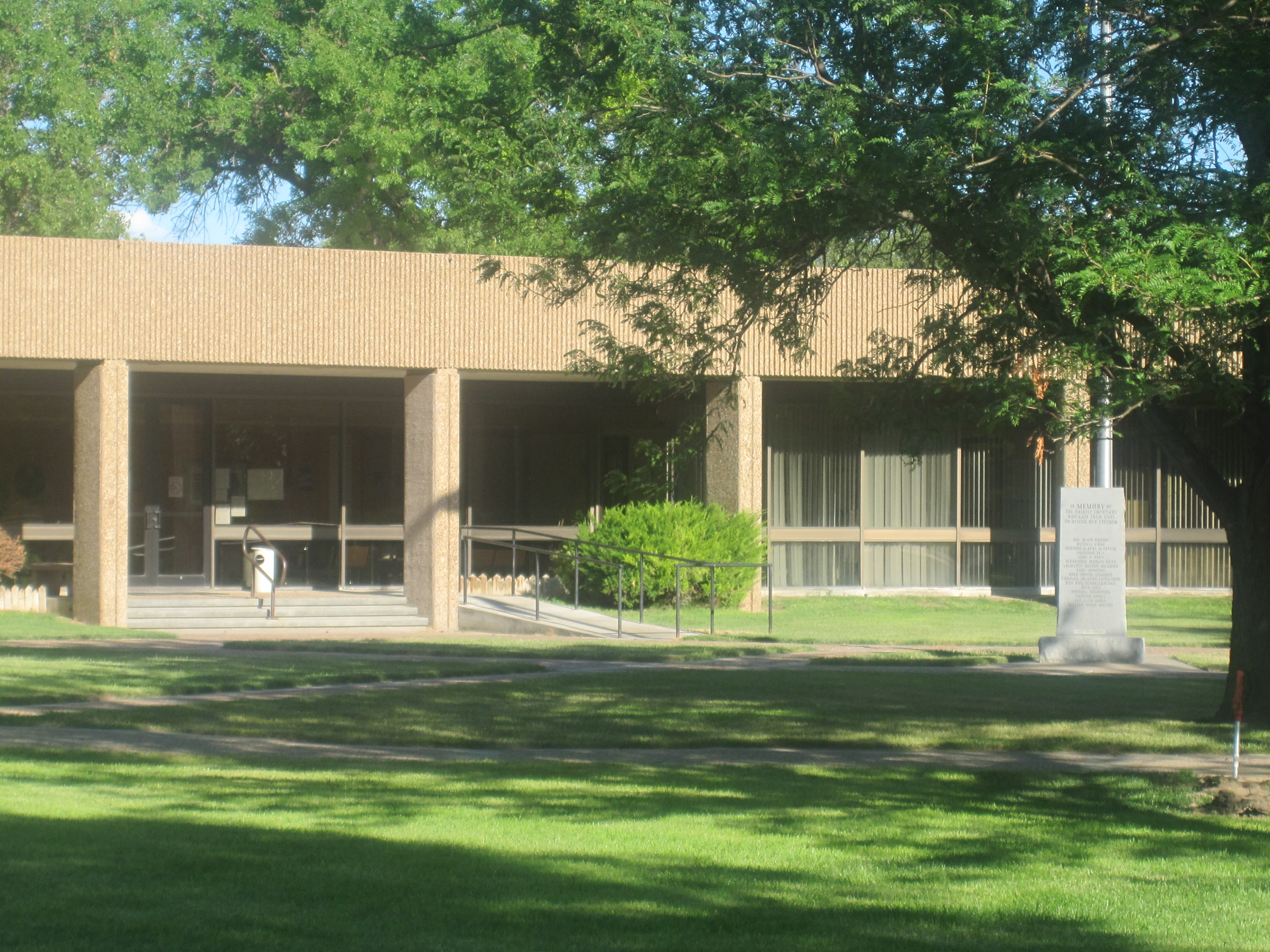
- Haskell County Courthouse in Sublette (2010)

- Location within the U.S. state of Kansas
- Coordinates: 37°34′00″N 100°52′01″W
- Country: United States
- State: Kansas
- Founded: March 23, 1887
- Named for: Dudley Haskell
- Seat: Sublette
- Largest city: Sublette

Area
  - Total: 578 sq mi (1,500 km^{2})
  - Land: 578 sq mi (1,500 km^{2})
  - Water: 0.4 sq mi (1.0 km^{2}) 0.06%

Population (2020)
  - Total: 3,780
  - Estimate (2025): 3,599 ▼
  - Density: 6.5/sq mi (2.5/km^{2})
- Time zone: UTC−6 (Central)
  - Summer (DST): UTC−5 (CDT)
- Congressional district: 1st
- Website: HaskellCounty.org

Haskell County is a county located in the U.S. state of Kansas. Its county seat and most populous city is Sublette. As of the 2020 census, the county population was 3,780. The county was named after Dudley Haskell, a congressman during the 1870s and 1880s.

== History ==
For millennia, the Great Plains of North America were inhabited by nomadic Native Americans.

In 1854, the Kansas Territory was organized, then in 1861 Kansas became the 34th U.S. state.

Haskell County was founded in 1887. It was named for Dudley C. Haskell, a former member of Congress.

=== Origin of the Spanish flu pandemic ===
Historian John M. Barry concluded that Haskell County was the location of the first outbreak of the 1918 flu pandemic (nicknamed "Spanish flu"), which killed between 21 and 100 million people. Loring Miner, a Haskell County doctor, warned the editors of Public Health Reports of the U.S. Public Health Service about the new and more deadly variant of the virus. It produced the common influenza symptoms with a new intensity: "violent headache and body aches, high fever, non-productive cough... This was violent, rapid in its progress through the body, and sometimes lethal. This influenza killed. Soon dozens of patients—the strongest, the healthiest, the most robust people in the county—were being struck down as suddenly as if they had been shot." Barry writes that in the first six months of 1918, Miner's warning of "the influenza of a severe type" was the only reference in that journal to influenza anywhere in the world.

According to American author and historian John M. Barry,

"Haskell County, Kansas, is the first recorded instance anywhere in the world of an outbreak of influenza so unusual that a physician warned public health officials. It remains the first recorded instance suggesting that a new virus was adapting, violently, to man.

If the virus did not originate in Haskell, there is no good explanation for how it arrived there. There were no other known outbreaks anywhere in the United States from which someone could have carried the disease to Haskell and no suggestions of influenza outbreaks in either newspapers or reflected in vital statistics anywhere else in the region. And unlike the 1916 outbreak in France, one can trace with perfect definiteness the route of the virus from Haskell to the outside world."

Miner's report was not published until April 1918 and it failed to collect the attention it needed. It was not until after 2000 that historians' research revealed the origin of one of the deadliest epidemics in human history.

Historians have generally reported that the path of the disease from Haskell to the world occurred when newly inducted soldiers from the county traveled 200 miles from the county to Camp Funston (now Fort Riley) and were then deployed to Europe at the beginning of United States involvement in World War I.

However, Haskell County's role in the pandemic is widely disputed. Many pathologists believe that Haskell County did not play a role in the virus's origin and that historical accounts are entirely coincidental.

=== Surviving the Dust Bowl ===
The railroad and the development of oil and gas fields in the 1930s, and the locating of many deep wells for irrigation significantly improved the economy of the area helping overcome the "dust bowl" of that period. Haskell County was one of the hardest hit counties in the Midwest during the drought of 1930–1937.

The first rodeo and fair was held in Sublette in 1916 and the fair continues at the same location. The first school district was founded in Santa Fe in 1887. Amanda I. Watkins, who owned a considerable amount of land in the county, was named "World Wheat Queen" in 1926.

== Geography ==
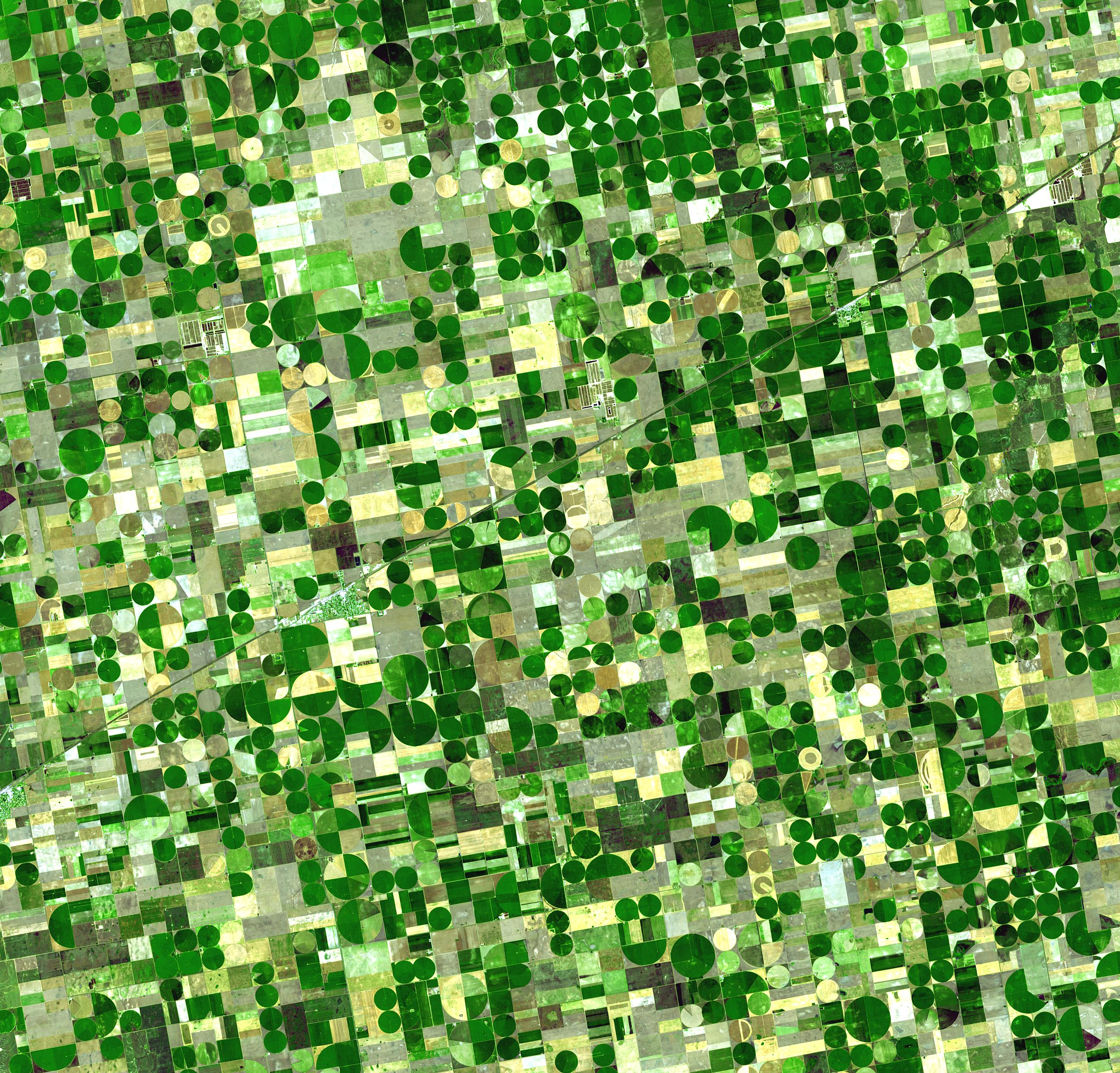
Satellite image of circular crop fields in Haskell County in late June 2001.

According to the U.S. Census Bureau, the county has a total area of 578 square miles (1,500 km^{2}), of which 578 square miles (1,500 km^{2}) is land and 0.4 square miles (1.0 km^{2}) (0.06%) is water.

Haskell County is the flattest county in Kansas.

=== Adjacent counties ===
- Finney County (north)
- Gray County (east)
- Meade County (southeast)
- Seward County (south)
- Stevens County (southwest)
- Grant County (west)
- Kearny County (northwest)

== Demographics ==
Historical population
Census	Pop.	Note	%±
1890	1,077		—
1900	457		−57.6%
1910	993		117.3%
1920	1,455		46.5%
1930	2,805		92.8%
1940	2,088		−25.6%
1950	2,606		24.8%
1960	2,990		14.7%
1970	3,672		22.8%
1980	3,814		3.9%
1990	3,886		1.9%
2000	4,307		10.8%
2010	4,256		−1.2%
2020	3,780		−11.2%
2025 (est.)	3,599	▼	−4.8%
U.S. Decennial Census; 1790–1960 1900–1990; 1990–2000 2010–2020

=== 2020 census ===
As of the 2020 census, the county had a population of 3,780. The median age was 34.3 years. 30.2% of residents were under the age of 18 and 14.4% of residents were 65 years of age or older. For every 100 females there were 96.0 males, and for every 100 females age 18 and over there were 97.5 males age 18 and over. 0.0% of residents lived in urban areas, while 100.0% lived in rural areas.

The racial makeup of the county was 75.2% White, 0.3% Black or African American, 0.3% American Indian and Alaska Native, 0.1% Asian, 0.0% Native Hawaiian and Pacific Islander, 14.7% from some other race, and 9.4% from two or more races. Hispanic or Latino residents of any race comprised 29.6% of the population.

There were 1,345 households in the county, of which 39.6% had children under the age of 18 living with them and 18.1% had a female householder with no spouse or partner present. About 21.2% of all households were made up of individuals and 9.7% had someone living alone who was 65 years of age or older.

There were 1,545 housing units, of which 12.9% were vacant. Among occupied housing units, 72.9% were owner-occupied and 27.1% were renter-occupied. The homeowner vacancy rate was 2.1% and the rental vacancy rate was 10.1%.

=== 2000 census ===
As of the 2000 census, there were 4,307 people, 1,481 households, and 1,153 families residing in the county. The population density was 8 people per square mile (3.1 people/km^{2}). There were 1,639 housing units at an average density of 3 per square mile (1.2/km^{2}). The racial makeup of the county was 85.07% White, 0.63% Asian, 0.58% Native American, 0.19% Black or African American, 11.45% from other races, and 2.09% from two or more races. Hispanic or Latino of any race were 23.57% of the population.

There were 1,481 households, out of which 43.60% had children under the age of 18 living with them, 69.40% were married couples living together, 5.90% had a female householder with no husband present, and 22.10% were non-families. 20.10% of all households were made up of individuals, and 9.20% had someone living alone who was 65 years of age or older. The average household size was 2.88 and the average family size was 3.35.

In the county, the population was spread out, with 32.90% under the age of 18, 9.10% from 18 to 24, 27.80% from 25 to 44, 19.50% from 45 to 64, and 10.60% who were 65 years of age or older. The median age was 31 years. For every 100 females there were 103.30 males. For every 100 females age 18 and over, there were 98.30 males.

The median income for a household in the county was $38,634, and the median income for a family was $43,354. Males had a median income of $31,296 versus $22,857 for females. The per capita income for the county was $17,349. About 8.00% of families and 11.60% of the population were below the poverty line, including 15.40% of those under age 18 and 9.40% of those age 65 or over.

== Government ==
=== Presidential elections ===
As do most counties in rural western Kansas, Haskell County leans heavily Republican. The last time Haskell County was carried by a Democratic presidential nominee was 1964, when Lyndon B. Johnson won the county as part of his nationwide landslide victory.

Presidential election results

United States presidential election results for Haskell County, Kansas
Year	Republican		Democratic		Third party(ies)	
Year	No.	%	No.	%	No.	%
1888	291	55.01%	197	37.24%	41	7.75%
1892	177	61.46%	0	0.00%	111	38.54%
1896	81	58.70%	54	39.13%	3	2.17%
1900	79	64.23%	44	35.77%	0	0.00%
1904	120	69.77%	46	26.74%	6	3.49%
1908	172	48.73%	139	39.38%	42	11.90%
1912	61	25.42%	100	41.67%	79	32.92%
1916	248	36.20%	349	50.95%	88	12.85%
1920	444	69.59%	150	23.51%	44	6.90%
1924	493	65.13%	167	22.06%	97	12.81%
1928	646	73.41%	222	25.23%	12	1.36%
1932	456	40.50%	639	56.75%	31	2.75%
1936	442	41.35%	626	58.56%	1	0.09%
1940	607	58.48%	425	40.94%	6	0.58%
1944	520	59.91%	342	39.40%	6	0.69%
1948	592	54.66%	466	43.03%	25	2.31%
1952	870	74.30%	283	24.17%	18	1.54%
1956	829	70.49%	341	29.00%	6	0.51%
1960	853	64.23%	471	35.47%	4	0.30%
1964	570	40.45%	820	58.20%	19	1.35%
1968	762	54.16%	476	33.83%	169	12.01%
1972	1,036	71.55%	383	26.45%	29	2.00%
1976	761	51.98%	676	46.17%	27	1.84%
1980	1,014	67.65%	374	24.95%	111	7.40%
1984	1,152	79.34%	283	19.49%	17	1.17%
1988	964	67.41%	427	29.86%	39	2.73%
1992	1,023	56.02%	336	18.40%	467	25.58%
1996	1,143	73.55%	304	19.56%	107	6.89%
2000	1,323	81.87%	263	16.27%	30	1.86%
2004	1,356	84.80%	227	14.20%	16	1.00%
2008	1,277	81.34%	278	17.71%	15	0.96%
2012	1,159	83.02%	215	15.40%	22	1.58%
2016	1,040	76.81%	245	18.09%	69	5.10%
2020	1,122	79.57%	268	19.01%	20	1.42%
2024	1,045	81.77%	221	17.29%	12	0.94%

=== Laws ===
Although the Kansas Constitution was amended in 1986 to allow the sale of alcoholic liquor by the individual drink with the approval of voters, Haskell County remained a prohibition, or "dry", county until 2023, after voters in the county approved the 1986 amendment with a 30% food sales requirement.

== Education ==
=== Unified school districts ===
- Sublette USD 374
- Satanta USD 507

== Communities ==
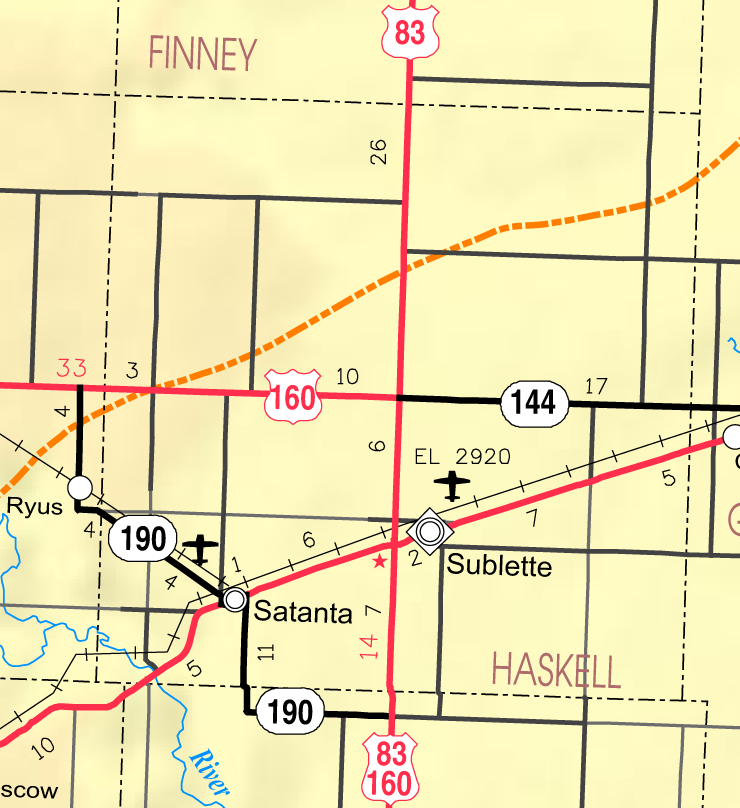
2005 map of Haskell County (map legend)

List of townships / incorporated cities / unincorporated communities / extinct former communities within Haskell County.

=== Cities ===
- Satanta
- Sublette (county seat)

=== Unincorporated community ===
- Tice

=== Ghost town ===
- Santa Fe (historical)

=== Townships ===
Area affected by 1930s Dust Bowl

Haskell County is divided into three townships. None of the cities within the county are considered governmentally independent, and all figures for the townships include those of the cities. In the following table, the population center is the largest city (or cities) included in that township's population total, if it is of a significant size.

Township	FIPS	Population center	Population	Population density /km^{2} (/sq mi)	Land area km^{2} (sq mi)	Water area km^{2} (sq mi)	Water %	Geographic coordinates
Dudley	18825		1,814	4 (9)	499 (193)	0 (0)	0.03%	37°30′40″N 101°0′28″W
Haskell	30625		1,971	4 (10)	498 (192)	0 (0)	0.07%	37°32′25″N 100°51′43″W
Lockport	41675		522	1 (3)	498 (192)	0 (0)	0.09%	37°34′19″N 100°43′11″W
Sources: "Census 2000 U.S. Gazetteer Files". U.S. Census Bureau, Geography Division. Archived from the original on August 2, 2002.

== See also ==
- High Plains (United States)
- Great Plains

Community information for Kansas

- Kansas locations by per capita income
- List of counties in Kansas
- List of townships in Kansas
- List of cities in Kansas
- List of unincorporated communities in Kansas
- List of ghost towns in Kansas
