= Sublette, Kansas =

City in Haskell County, Kansas

- City and county seat
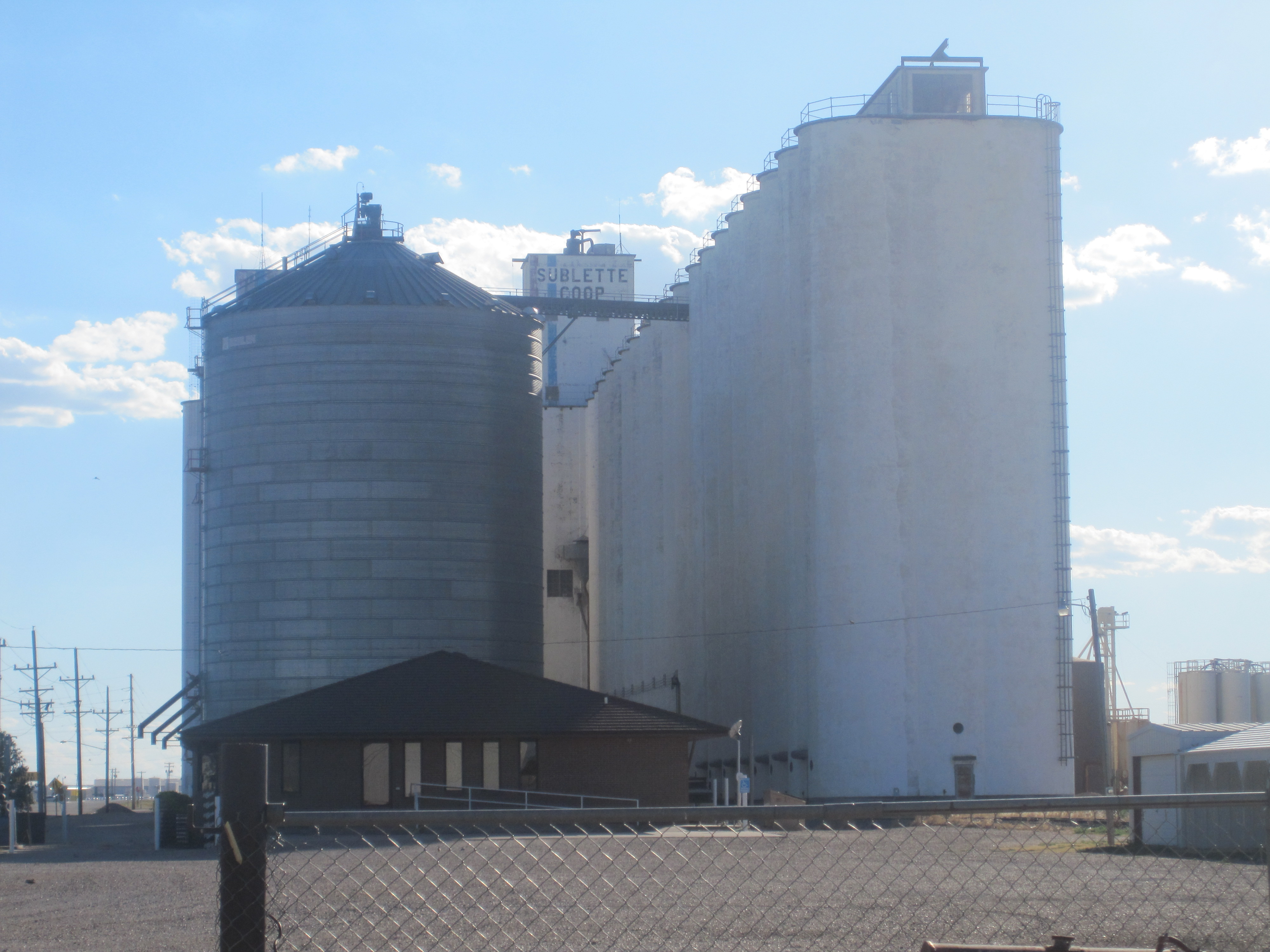
- Sublette Cooperative grain elevator (2010)

- Location within Haskell County and Kansas

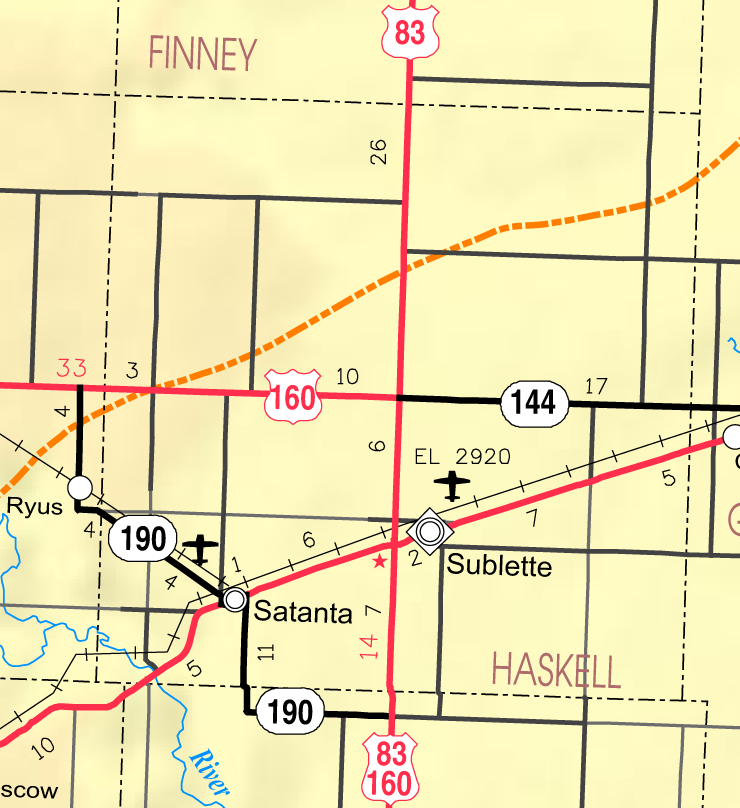
- KDOT map of Haskell County (legend)
- Coordinates: 37°28′47″N 100°50′42″W
- Country: United States
- State: Kansas
- County: Haskell
- Founded: June 5, 1912
- Incorporated: March 5, 1923
- Named for: William Sublette

Area
  - Total: 1.05 sq mi (2.72 km^{2})
  - Land: 1.05 sq mi (2.72 km^{2})
  - Water: 0 sq mi (0.00 km^{2})
- Elevation: 2,914 ft (888 m)

Population (2020)
  - Total: 1,413
  - Density: 1,350/sq mi (519/km^{2})
- Time zone: UTC-6 (CST)
  - Summer (DST): UTC-5 (CDT)
- ZIP Code: 67877
- Area code: 620
- FIPS code: 20-68775
- GNIS ID: 470607
- Website: sublettekansas.com

Sublette is a city in and the county seat of Haskell County, Kansas, United States. As of 2020, its population was 1,413.

== History ==
Sublette was founded in 1912. It was named for William Lewis Sublette, a French Huguenot who was a partner in the Rocky Mountain Fur Company. Sublette was a mountain man, fur trapper and pioneer who blazed a trail through the area and was known by the local natives as "Cut Face".

The first post office in Sublette was established in January 1913. Circa 1913, the population of Sublette was around 270. The first baby born in Sublette was named Gladys Sublette Boaz, delivered by Dr. Loring Minor. Sublette was once a larger town called Santa Fe; however, the people of Santa Fe wanted to move closer to a railroad and set up a settlement called Sublette.

== Geography ==
Sublette is located at 37°28′47″N 100°50′42″W (37.479660, −100.845034). According to the United States Census Bureau, the city has a total area of 0.92 square miles (2.38 km^{2}), all land.

=== Climate ===
According to the Köppen Climate Classification system, Sublette has a semi-arid climate, abbreviated "BSk" on climate maps.

Climate data for Sublette, Kansas, 1991–2020 normals, extremes 1918–2019
Month	Jan	Feb	Mar	Apr	May	Jun	Jul	Aug	Sep	Oct	Nov	Dec	Year
Record high °F (°C)	80 (27)	89 (32)	92 (33)	98 (37)	105 (41)	112 (44)	110 (43)	111 (44)	105 (41)	99 (37)	88 (31)	86 (30)	112 (44)
Mean maximum °F (°C)	69.3 (20.7)	74.0 (23.3)	81.7 (27.6)	88.9 (31.6)	93.8 (34.3)	100.2 (37.9)	102.4 (39.1)	100.5 (38.1)	96.9 (36.1)	89.7 (32.1)	76.9 (24.9)	67.6 (19.8)	103.4 (39.7)
Mean daily maximum °F (°C)	49.0 (9.4)	53.5 (11.9)	63.3 (17.4)	71.7 (22.1)	80.6 (27.0)	90.4 (32.4)	94.4 (34.7)	92.0 (33.3)	85.9 (29.9)	74.1 (23.4)	60.1 (15.6)	49.2 (9.6)	72.0 (22.2)
Daily mean °F (°C)	34.5 (1.4)	38.3 (3.5)	47.4 (8.6)	55.5 (13.1)	65.2 (18.4)	75.2 (24.0)	79.5 (26.4)	77.6 (25.3)	70.5 (21.4)	58.1 (14.5)	45.0 (7.2)	35.6 (2.0)	56.9 (13.8)
Mean daily minimum °F (°C)	20.0 (−6.7)	23.2 (−4.9)	31.4 (−0.3)	39.2 (4.0)	49.8 (9.9)	60.0 (15.6)	64.7 (18.2)	63.1 (17.3)	55.1 (12.8)	42.0 (5.6)	29.9 (−1.2)	22.1 (−5.5)	41.7 (5.4)
Mean minimum °F (°C)	2.7 (−16.3)	4.3 (−15.4)	12.4 (−10.9)	24.1 (−4.4)	35.2 (1.8)	47.9 (8.8)	55.4 (13.0)	53.9 (12.2)	37.8 (3.2)	25.8 (−3.4)	12.3 (−10.9)	1.8 (−16.8)	−4.9 (−20.5)
Record low °F (°C)	−24 (−31)	−17 (−27)	−15 (−26)	7 (−14)	24 (−4)	36 (2)	45 (7)	40 (4)	25 (−4)	8 (−13)	−3 (−19)	−18 (−28)	−24 (−31)
Average precipitation inches (mm)	0.44 (11)	0.36 (9.1)	1.09 (28)	1.60 (41)	2.28 (58)	2.96 (75)	2.72 (69)	2.69 (68)	1.30 (33)	1.64 (42)	0.58 (15)	0.64 (16)	18.30 (465)
Average snowfall inches (cm)	2.5 (6.4)	2.5 (6.4)	3.6 (9.1)	0.8 (2.0)	0.1 (0.25)	0.0 (0.0)	0.0 (0.0)	0.0 (0.0)	0.0 (0.0)	0.7 (1.8)	1.4 (3.6)	3.4 (8.6)	15.0 (38)
Average precipitation days (≥ 0.01 in)	1.7	2.1	3.8	5.3	5.8	7.2	6.3	6.8	3.9	4.2	2.6	2.5	52.2
Average snowy days (≥ 0.1 in)	1.6	1.6	1.5	0.4	0.0	0.0	0.0	0.0	0.0	0.2	0.7	1.6	7.6
Source: NOAA (mean maxima/minima 1981–2010)

== Demographics ==
Historical population
Census	Pop.	Note	%±
1930	673		—
1940	582		−13.5%
1950	838		44.0%
1960	1,077		28.5%
1970	1,208		12.2%
1980	1,293		7.0%
1990	1,378		6.6%
2000	1,592		15.5%
2010	1,453		−8.7%
2020	1,413		−2.8%
U.S. Decennial Census

=== 2010 census ===
As of the census of 2010, there were 1,453 people, 556 households, and 409 families residing in the city. The population density was 1,579.3 inhabitants per square mile (609.8/km^{2}). There were 626 housing units at an average density of 680.4 per square mile (262.7/km^{2}). The racial makeup of the city was 85.1% White, 0.1% African American, 1.0% Native American, 0.1% Asian, 11.8% from other races, and 2.0% from two or more races. Hispanic or Latino of any race were 26.8% of the population.

There were 556 households, of which 38.3% had children under the age of 18 living with them, 61.0% were married couples living together, 8.1% had a female householder with no husband present, 4.5% had a male householder with no wife present, and 26.4% were non-families. 24.3% of all households were made up of individuals, and 11.4% had someone living alone who was 65 years of age or older. The average household size was 2.61 and the average family size was 3.09.

The median age in the city was 36.9 years. 28.8% of residents were under the age of 18; 7.6% were between the ages of 18 and 24; 23.5% were from 25 to 44; 27.9% were from 45 to 64; and 12.2% were 65 years of age or older. The gender makeup of the city was 49.7% male and 50.3% female.

=== 2000 census ===
As of the census of 2000, there were 1,592 people, 574 households, and 441 families residing in the city. The population density was 1,690.2 inhabitants per square mile (652.6/km^{2}). There were 645 housing units at an average density of 684.8 per square mile (264.4/km^{2}). The racial makeup of the city was 84.61% White, 0.19% African American, 0.82% Native American, 0.88% Asian, 10.99% from other races, and 2.51% from two or more races. Hispanic or Latino of any race were 21.36% of the population.

There were 574 households, out of which 41.1% had children under the age of 18 living with them, 67.2% were married couples living together, 7.3% had a female householder with no husband present, and 23.0% were non-families. 20.9% of all households were made up of individuals, and 10.8% had someone living alone who was 65 years of age or older. The average household size was 2.77 and the average family size was 3.22.

In the city, the population was spread out, with 32.0% under the age of 18, 8.2% from 18 to 24, 26.5% from 25 to 44, 22.2% from 45 to 64, and 11.1% who were 65 years of age or older. The median age was 33 years. For every 100 females, there were 102.0 males. For every 100 females age 18 and over, there were 97.3 males.

The median income for a household in the city was $40,161, and the median income for a family was $43,167. Males had a median income of $33,611 versus $22,708 for females. The per capita income for the city was $17,787. About 7.8% of families and 12.1% of the population were below the poverty line, including 18.7% of those under age 18 and 9.1% of those age 65 or over.

== Education ==
The community is served by Sublette USD 374 public school district.

== Media ==
=== Print ===
The Haskell County Monitor-Chief is the local newspaper.

=== Radio ===
There are no radio stations licensed to Sublette.

=== Television ===
Sublette is in the Wichita–Hutchinson, Kansas television market. KDGL-LD is licensed to Sublette Kansas and is the flagship station of High Plains Broadcasting, LLC. KDGL broadcasts on RF channel 23 carrying 6 video streams. Current Networks are Retro TV, Tuff TV, AMG TV, Launch TV, TheWalk TV, and PBJ TV. KDGL uses TV23 as branding for all 5 licenses including Dodge City, Garden City, Liberal, and Ulysses. Sublette was chosen for its central location in the Southwest Kansas Market and to streamline future news gathering for NewsWest23 newscasts.

== Notable people ==
- Jack Christiansen, Hall of Fame football player for the Detroit Lions
- Shalee Lehning, former professional basketball player for the Atlanta Dream, and associate head coach on the Northern Colorado women's basketball team
- Otto Schnellbacher, (1923–2008), played both basketball and football (American) professionally
- Ted Trimpa, Democratic strategist and political consultant

== Gallery ==
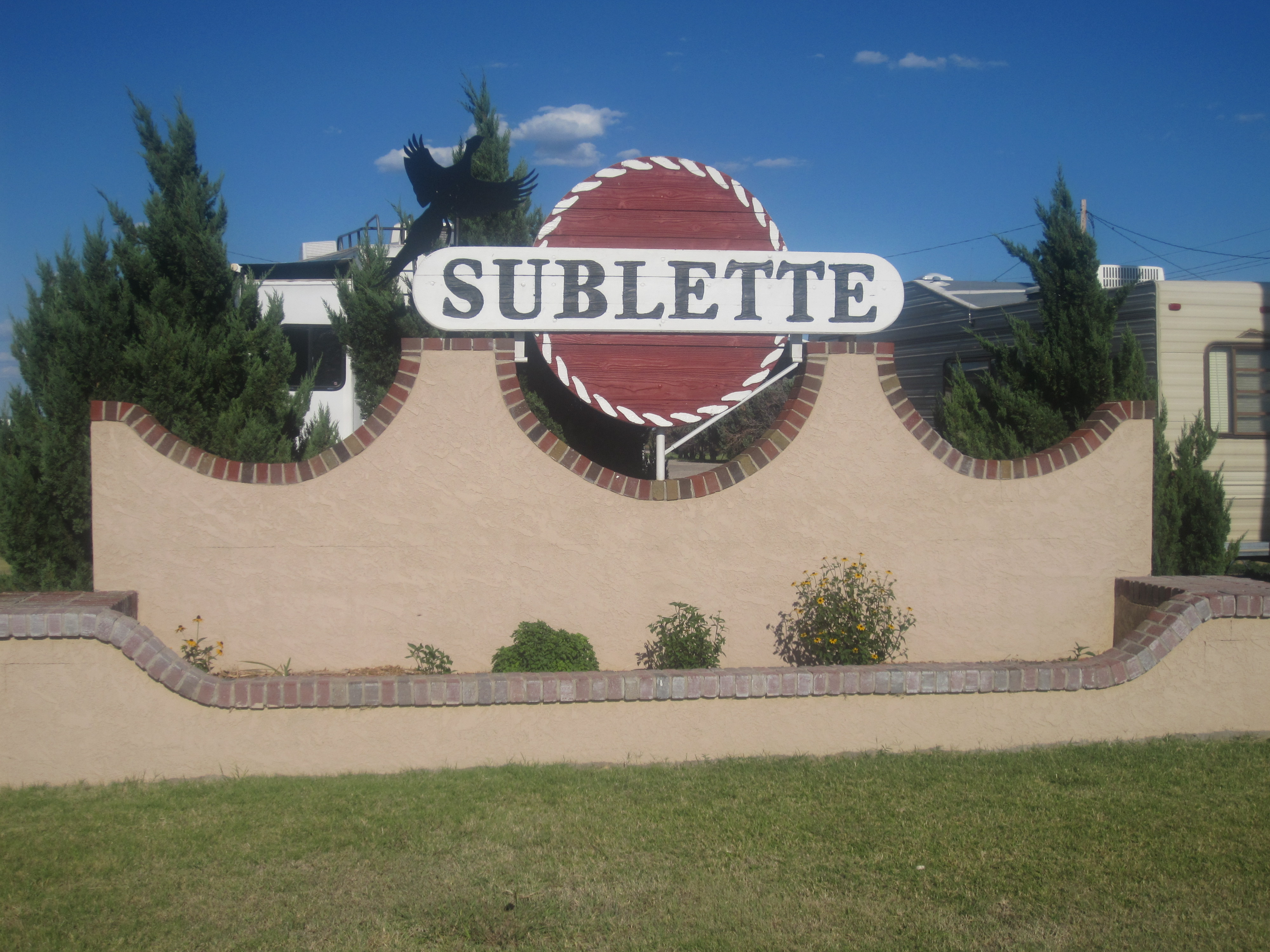
Sublette welcome sign (2010)

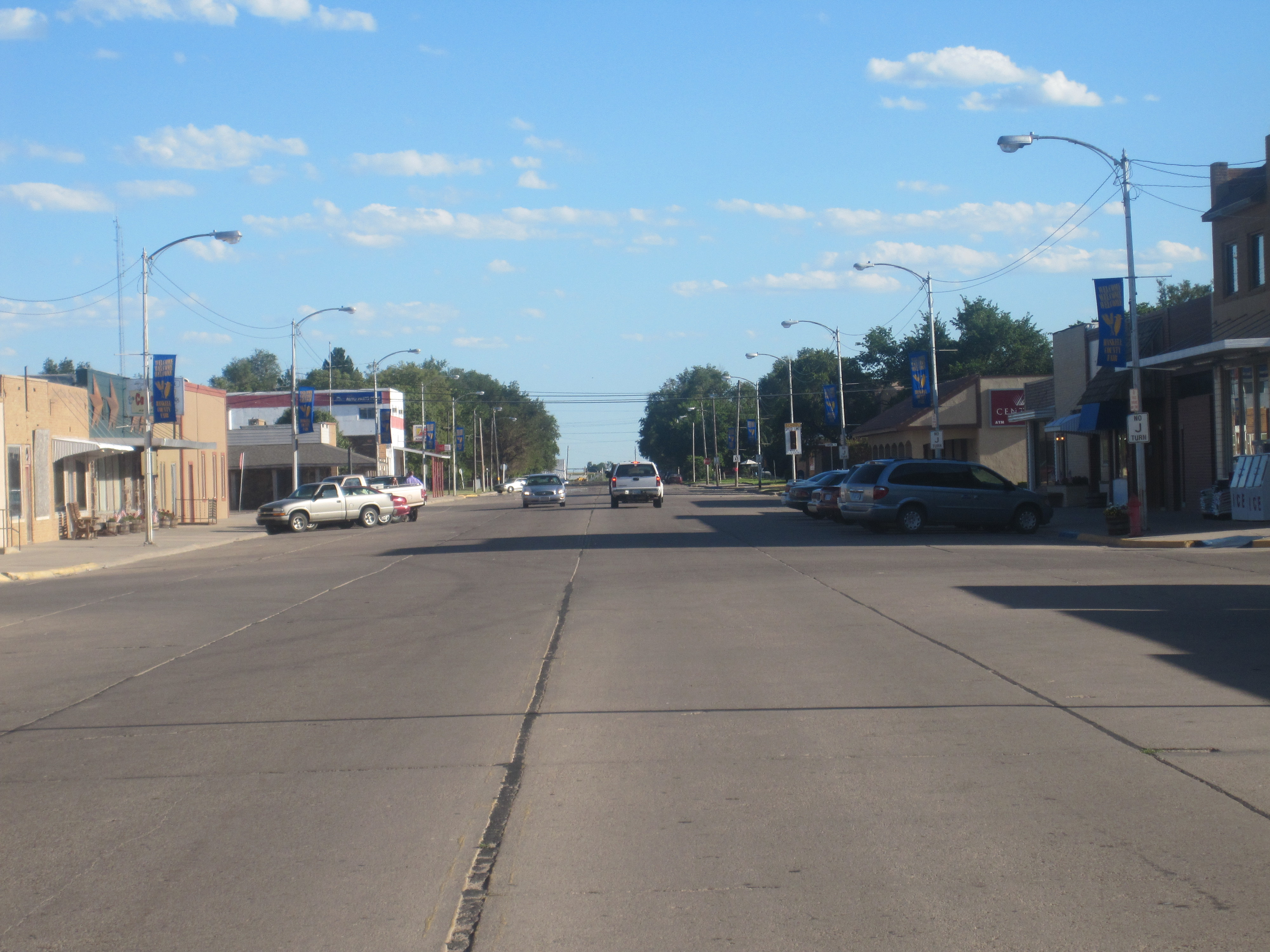
Downtown Sublette (2010)

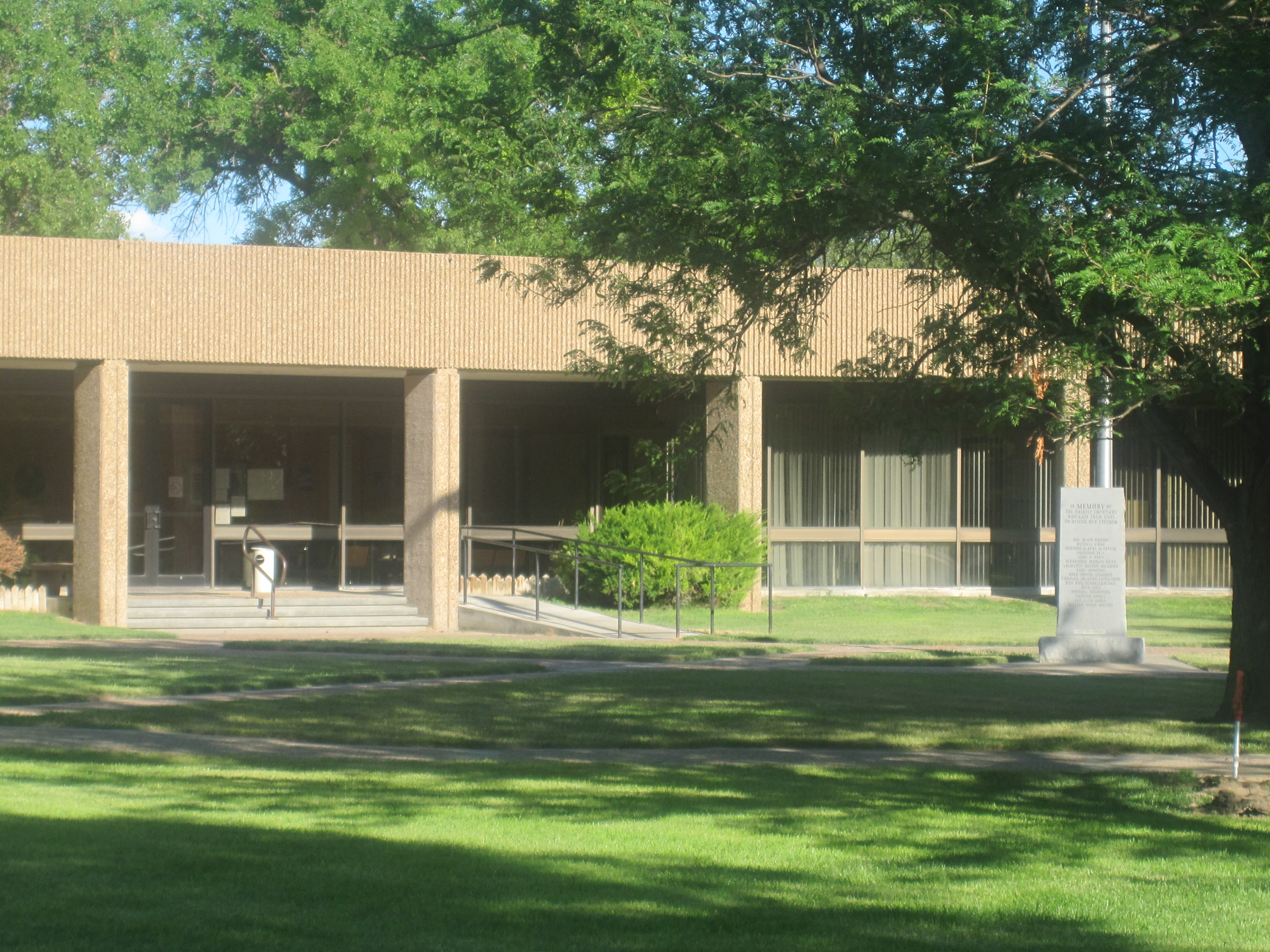
Haskell County Court House (2010)

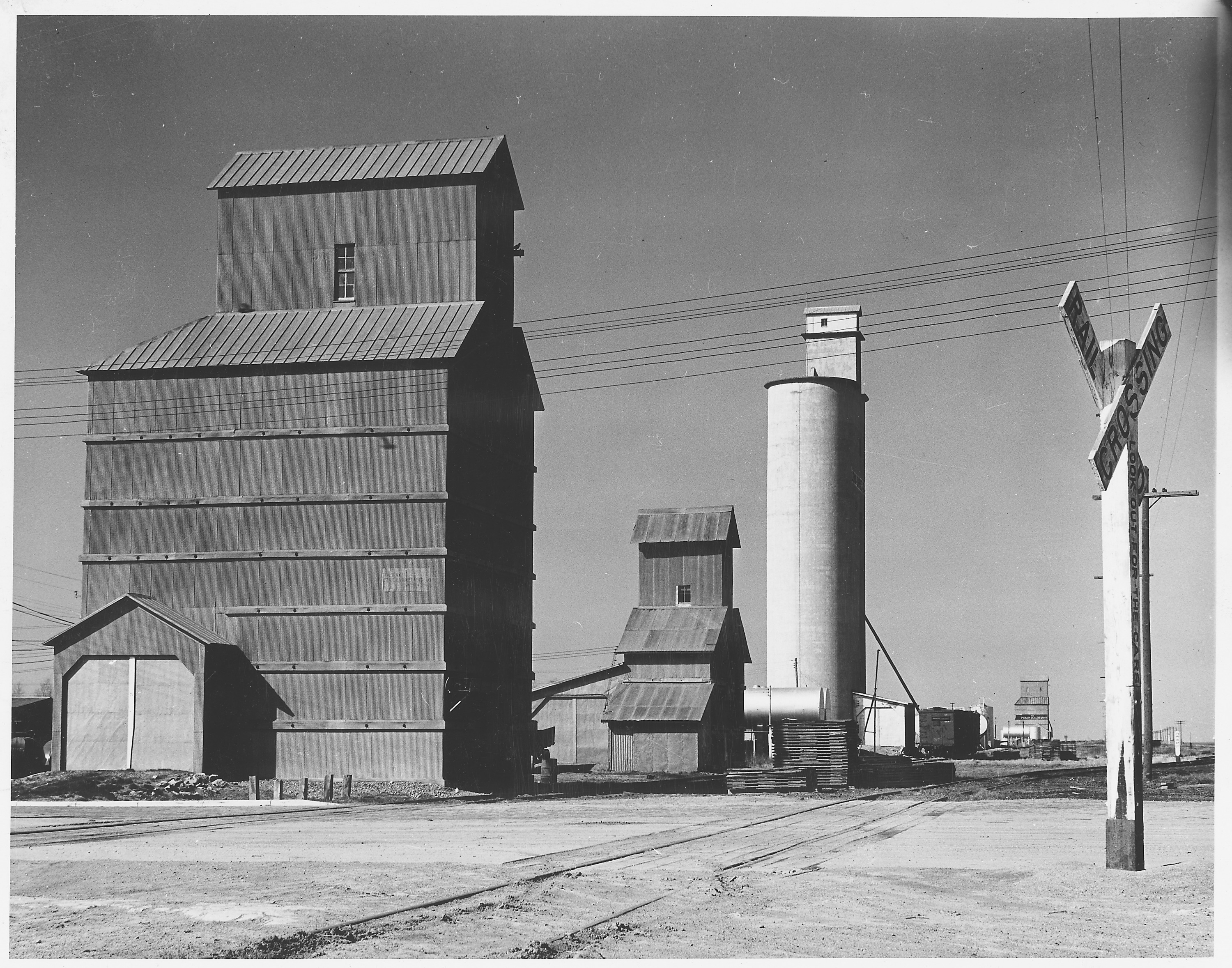
Grain elevators near the depot in Sublette (1950s)
