= Tribune (disambiguation) =

Tribune was a title shared by several political and military offices of the Roman Republic and Empire.

Tribune may also refer to:

== Publications ==
- The Tribune (disambiguation), a list of newspapers
- La Tribune (disambiguation), a list of French-language newspapers
- Tribune (magazine), formerly weekly, now quarterly, left-wing magazine published in London, England
- Tribune (Australian newspaper), official newspaper of the Communist Party of Australia, from 1939–1991
- The Tribune (India), Indian English-language daily newspaper

== Places ==
=== Canada ===
- Tribune, Saskatchewan, a village
- Tribune Bay, a bay of Hornby Island, British Columbia
- Tribune Channel, a strait in British Columbia
- Tribune Point, the southernmost tip of Gilford Island, British Columbia
- Tribune Rock, in the Queen Charlotte Strait region of British Columbia (see Tribune Channel above for details)

=== United States ===
- Tribune, Kansas, a city
- Tribune Township, Greeley County, Kansas
- Tribune, Kentucky, an unincorporated community

== In business ==
- Tribune Media, a media company based in Chicago, Illinois, United States
  - Tribune Broadcasting, a group of television and radio stations owned and operated by the Tribune Media Company
- Tribune Publishing, a media company based in Chicago, Illinois, United States
- Tribune Studios (disambiguation), two business divisions

== Other uses ==
- Tribune (architecture), in architecture, a term applied to various features
- a member of the Tribunat, a deliberative assembly during the latter stages of the French Revolution
- HMS Tribune, various Royal Navy ships
- A tradename for the herbicide diquat

== See also ==
- Daily Tribune (disambiguation)
- The Express Tribune, a daily English-language newspaper based in Pakistan
- Tribune Tower, headquarters of the Chicago Tribune, the Tribune Media Company and the Tribune Publishing Company in Chicago, Illinois, United States
- Tribune Tower (Oakland), home of The Oakland Tribune in Oakland, California, United States
- La Tribune des Peuples (March–November 1849), a weekly political magazine published in Paris, France
- Tribunal, in law, a generic term for any body acting judicially
- Tribun Network, a chain of newspapers published in Indonesia
- Progressive Democratic Tribune - Bahrain, a political party in Bahrain
