= Colokan, Kansas =

Ghost town in Greeley County, Kansas, United States

- Ghost town
- Location within Kansas Location within the United States
- Coordinates: 38°28′20.06″N 102°2′33.65″W
- Country: United States
- State: Kansas
- County: Greeley
- Founded: 1886
- Platted: 1887
- Dissolved: 1897
- Named for: Colorado & Kansas
- Elevation: 3,895 ft (1,187 m)

Population
  - Total: 0
- Time zone: UTC−7 (MST)
  - Summer (DST): UTC−6 (MDT)
- FIPS code: 20-35900
- GNIS ID: 484920

Colokan was a community in Greeley County, Kansas, United States. Located roughly half-a-mile from the Colorado–Kansas border, it was founded in 1886 by a group of 42 Civil War veterans from Murphysboro, Illinois, as a soldiers' colony. A post office named Colokan, a portmanteau of the U.S. states of Colorado and Kansas, opened on December 2, 1886. The following year, after the veterans had published a circular promoting the colony, a United Presbyterian community was established just south of the original soldiers' colony. After the construction of the Denver, Memphis, & Atlantic (D. M. & A.) Railroad, the two colonies agreed to merge into one town, named Colokan; a plat for it was filed on September 26, 1887. A newspaper for Colokan, The Colokan Graphic, printed its first issue on November 10, 1887.

Throughout 1888, Colokan was involved in a rivalry with Towner, Colorado, over which settlement the D. M. & A. would stop at. Various stations were built at both Colokan and Towner before, eventually, Colokan's station was permanently closed, and Towner's remained open. Colokan went into sharp decline afterwards, with The Colokan Graphic ceasing publication in July 1888. The post office was shut down in December 1892 and, in 1897, Colokan was officially vacated by the Kansas Legislature. The community has been referred to as a ghost town.

== History ==
=== Founding (1886) ===
In spring of 1886, a group of 42 veterans of the American Civil War came from Murphysboro, Illinois, to the U.S. state of Kansas, in hopes of establishing a soldiers' colony. The group had traveled throughout Kansas, and eventually settled in western Greeley County. Despite there not being much land to settle on, they had hired a surveyor from Greeley Center, who directed the group towards the Colorado–Kansas border. After testing the depth and quality of the soil, they chose the area for their colony. The group immediately filed for 42 claims and thereafter established a soldiers' colony, with hopes of installing various claims across the West. R. H. Morgan assumed presidency over the colony; other officials included R. Q. Thompson as vice president, W. A. Rogers as secretary, and C. J. Childs as treasurer. Both Thompson and Rogers had previously served in the Illinois Legislature. On December 2, 1886, a post office for the colony was built. After establishing the soldiers' colony, several of the veterans traveled back to Illinois where they published a circular advertising the settlement as a "golden" spot for those who were "poor in health, poor in pocket, with no prospect of bettering either".

=== Growth (1887–1888) ===
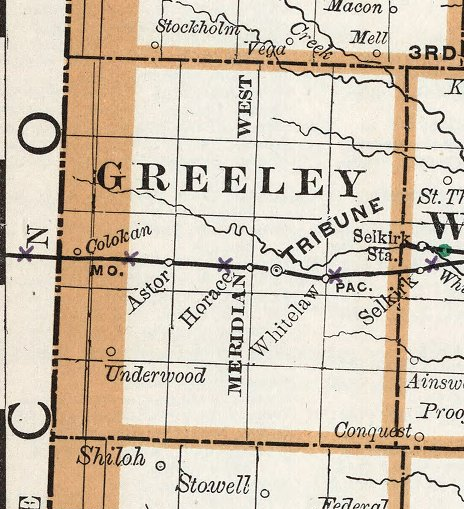
1888 map of Greeley County by Rand McNally.

Following the circular's publication, the colony expanded in size throughout spring and summer of 1887; by February 1887, around 25 families resided in the area. Some of the new immigrants—specifically C. M. Rogers, Dr. J. C. Kilgore, and around 30 others, all from Manmouth, Iowa—established a United Presbyterian community just south of the colony. Rogers and Kilgore had been searching the West and became infatuated with Greeley County, feeling that the county sufficed plans for their community. The migrants rode the Union Pacific Railroad to Wallace, Kansas, then drove their wagons until they reached Greeley County. In March 1887, Reverend A. B. McCarroll preached to a congregation of 47 people. Plans for a church were developed, and the church was completed by the fall of 1887, where it had over 100 members.

In August 1887, the Denver, Memphis, & Atlantic (D. M. & A.) Railroad was built between the Presbyterian and soldiers' colonies. Following the railroad's construction, an agreement was reached between the two communities that they would merge. The Colokan Town Company was founded in September 1887, and, on the 26th, a plat for the community was filed; it was located in section 23 of township 18 range 43, roughly half-a-mile from the Colorado–Kansas border. The name Colokan is a portmanteau of Colorado and Kansas. Several officers for the company were installed: R. G. Burnett of Sheridan Lake, Colorado, as president; A. D. Jones and George Lee of Coolidge, Kansas, as vice president and treasurer, respectively; and James Montgomery, who resided in the colony, as secretary. The official location of Colokan was set just a half-mile from the Colorado–Kansas border.

O. Q. McNiel published and edited a newspaper for the community, The Colokan Graphic, with its first issue being printed on November 10, 1887. The first issue advertised a new hotel and restaurant, a real estate and notary public office, and building partnerships of Morgan & Thompson, who had been searching for a colony in the preceding months. The Colokan Graphic had promoted Colokan as "the star of western Kansas". Around a month later, The Colokan Graphic reported that roughly 500 families were residing in Colokan. By spring of 1888, a livestock feed store, a general store which carried "groceries, flour, feed, and coal", a grocery store, and a blacksmith shop, among various other businesses, were established in Colokan. In late March 1888, the First United Presbyterian Church of Colokan organized. Sometime that year, a Grand Army of the Republic post was founded in the Colokan area, with 20 charter members available.

=== Feud with Towner and decline (1888–1897) ===
Beginning in 1888, a rivalry between Colokan and the nearby community of Towner, Colorado, began over which settlement the D. M. & A. Railroad would stop at. As the two towns were only a short distance apart, (Note: Sources differ on exactly how far away Colokan was from Towner. Sorensen 1967 suggests the two were one-and-a-half miles apart, while Fitzgerald 1988 wrote that they were only a mile apart.) the line would only make a stop at one rather than both. A siding was built in Colokan, however it ended up being removed; McNiel was irate over its demolition, describing the D. M. & A. Railroad in The Colokan Graphic as "the greatest fraud we [ever] saw." He felt that the Missouri Pacific Railroad would construct a train station at Colokan; however, this proved to be false. He then relied on the Santa Fe Railroad to provide a station, but they stopped construction of tracks at the eastern border of Greeley County. Throughout the rivalry, there were attempts to move the station in Towner over to Colokan. Allegedly, a group of people from Colokan attempted to steal the station, but ended up stealing the wrong building.

The Colokan Town Company reorganized during the dispute, with A. D. Jones replacing Burnett as its president. The railroad proposed that Towner and Colokan be merged; however, both communities blocked the proposition. In March, the railroad appeared to have begun stopping at Colokan again, despite the merger of the Colokan Town Company and D. M. & A. Town Company. By mid-summer however, it had discontinued stops at both Towner and Colokan. At that time, a few settlers grew tired of the railroad dispute and immigrated to the Colorado–Kansas border with hopes of starting a community. Other settlers opposed a new village on the border, feeling that the difference between the state laws of Colorado and Kansas would create too much of a conflict. Towner eventually won the railroad dispute sometime in 1888, and Colokan's station was closed permanently. Following this, Colokan went into a sharp decline. McNiel stopped publication of The Colokan Graphic in July and moved to Horace, where he practiced law. By 1889, only three businesses were open: a blacksmith, a notary public, and a law office. The Western Kansas Town Company grew disinterested in the Colokan area. The post office was shut down on December 15, 1892, and Colokan was vacated by the Kansas Legislature in 1897.

Colokan has been referred to as a ghost town. According to the 1988 book Ghost Towns of Kansas, there were "little remains to mark [Colokan] today."

== Notes and references ==
Notes

== Sources ==
- Fitzgerald, Daniel (1988). Ghost Towns of Kansas: A Traveler's Guide. Lawrence, Kansas: University Press of Kansas. pp. 256–258. ISBN 0-7006-0368-9.
- Hackemer, Kurt (April 2020). Jordan, Brian Matthew; Rothera, Evan C. (eds.). "Civil War Veteran Colonies on the Western Frontier". The War Went On: Reconsidering the Lives of Civil War Veterans. Louisiana State University Press: 72. ISBN 9780807173046.
- Sorensen, Conner (1967). "Ghost Towns of Greeley County, Kansas". Greeley County Republican. Tribune, Kansas: 10–14.
