= Tribuna =

Tribuna may refer to:

- Tribuna (Russian newspaper), a Russian weekly newspaper
- Tribuna Portuguesa, a bilingual newspaper serving the Portuguese-American community
- Tribuna.com, a digital sports publisher
- Tribuna Monumental, a monument in Mexico City
- TV Tribuna, a television station in Rio Branco, Acre, Brazil
- TV Tribuna (Santos), a television station in Santos, São Paulo, Brazil
- TV Tribuna (Vitória), a television station in Vitória, Espírito Santo, Brazil

== See also ==
- La Tribuna (disambiguation)
- La Tribune
- The Tribune
- cs:Tribuna
