= TV Tribuna (Vitória) =

TV Tribuna (ZYP 604)
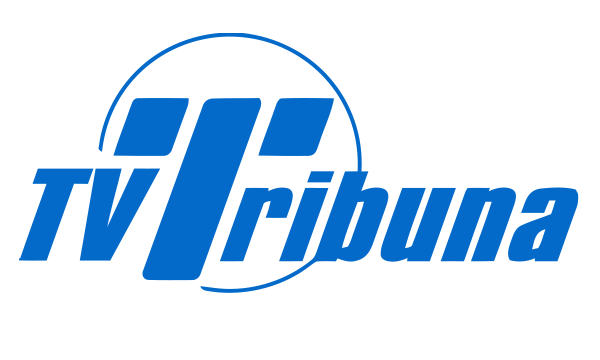
- Vitória, Espírito Santo; Brazil
- Channels: Digital: 42 (UHF); Virtual: 7

Programming
- Affiliations: Rede Bandeirantes

Ownership
- Owner: Rede Tribuna; (Nassau Editora Rádio e TV Ltda.)

History
- First air date: March 29, 1985
- Former call signs: ZYA 533 (1985-2017)
- Former channel numbers: Analog: 7 (VHF, 1989-2018)
- Former affiliations: SBT (1989-2024)

Technical information
- Licensing authority: ANATEL
- ERP: 0.2 kW
- Transmitter coordinates: 20°18′32.1″S 40°20′23.9″W

Links
- Public license information: Profile
- Website: tribunaonline.com.br/tv-tribuna?d=1

TV Tribuna (channel 7) is a Brazilian television station based in Vitória, capital of the state of Espírito Santo serving as an affiliate of Rede Bandeirantes for the entire state. Its studios are located in the João Santos Júnior Building, where the entire Rede Tribuna holding company operates, in the Ilha de Santa Maria neighborhood, and its transmission antenna is at the top of Morro da Fonte Grande.

== History ==
As soon as it opened, on March 29, 1985, it joined SBT. TV Tribuna was founded with a coverage radius of 50/60 km. The broadcaster covers practically all of Espírito Santo, with a single signal, providing viewers in Espírito Santo with diverse programming, mixing information and entertainment. With this, SBT recouped its lost affiliation in the state, as TV Vitória joined Rede Manchete the previous year.

On May 18, 2023, a meeting took place between TV Tribuna executives and the director of SBT affiliates, Daniel Abravanel, discussing the non-renewal of the contract between the São Paulo network and the Espírito Santo channel, as it would expire on July 1st. The reason for the end of the partnership was a judicial recovery process for the João Santos Group, which went against a clause imposed by the Sílvio Santos channel. On May 31, the end of the partnership between SBT and Tribuna was announced to the public, with the change taking effect from midnight on July 1.

On June 13, 2023, the 15th Civil Court of Recife of the Court of Justice of Pernambuco determined the compulsory renewal of TV Tribuna's affiliation contract with SBT until June 2028. The decision was based on TV Tribuna's financial dependence on SBT, which is responsible for 57.07% of Rede Tribuna's indirect costs. Furthermore, during the 38 years of partnership with the Abravanel broadcaster, TV Tribuna never failed to honor its commercial obligations. Maintaining the partnership as an affiliate of SBT would not bring any losses to the Abravanel family and would maintain Rede Tribuna's business activity and all its jobs. However, on July 14, one month after the Pernambuco TJ's decision, the injunction was overturned after Grupo Silvio Santos appealed the decision and declared the end of the partnership, being reverted in favor of Grupo João Santos on July 21, maintaining its SBT affiliation. Four months after the decision, Rede SIM, which would be its new affiliate, filed an appeal with the Supreme Federal Court to try to judicially recognize the new partnership and advance the process between SBT and TV Tribuna, with the request denied for not recognizing conflicts of jurisdiction between the decisions of the TJ-SP (where it was requested that the case be judged) and the TJ-PE.

On June 4, 2024, exactly one year after SBT's decision not to renew the affiliation contract with TV Tribuna, the São Paulo broadcaster aired on SBT Brasil, the network's main news program and shown nationally, a series of accusations against Grupo João Santos, owner of TV Tribuna Vitória and Recife, on charges of corruption and money laundering. According to Silvio Santos' channel management, more investigative reports about the company should be aired.

After months of legal imbroglio, SBT and Grupo João Santos reached an agreement and on December 8, 2024, the station announced that it would affiliate with Band, following the example of the homonym from Pernambuco, freeing SBT to affiliate with Rede SIM, which would occupy TV Capixaba signal through a joint venture agreement with Grupo Sá Cavalcante, with change coming into effect from January 1, 2025. The information was confirmed the following day (9) after a meeting between the three parties, and it was also informed that TV Tribuna had dropped the case against SBT. The station ceased its SBT broadcasts on December 31, 2024, during Vira Brasil 2025.

In the first minutes of 2025, the station aired part of the new year fireworks in Vitória and Vila Velha, announcing its affiliation with Band, and joining the network during Virada na Band. Local programming suffered schedule changes, such as Tribuna Notícias, whose first edition now started at 12pm and its second edition at 6:50pm. Tribuna Manhã at 8:15am, Brasil Urgente ES at 5:30pm and Minuto TN bulletins during breaks also made their premieres.

Between January 1 and 5, the station only aired the two editions of Tribuna Notícias, Minuto TN and independent productions as local programming, premiering its new line-up on January 6, with Tribuna Manhã and Brasil Urgente ES, increasing its local programming as announced. Brasil Urgente ES was previously shown by former affiliate TV Capixaba (now TV SIM).

== Technical information ==
Virtual channel	Digital channel	Screen	Content
42.1	7 UHF	1080i	Main TV Tribuna programming/Band

TV Tribuna shut down its analog broadcasts on VHF channel 7 on October 25, 2017, in accordance with ANATEL's roadmap.
