= TV Guararapes =

TV Guararapes (ZYB 309)
Recife, Pernambuco; Brazil
- Channels: Digital: 29 (UHF); Virtual: 9

Programming
- Affiliations: Record

Ownership
- Owner: Sistema Opinião de Comunicação; (TV Guararapes S.A.)

History
- First air date: January 1, 2000
- Former names: Canal 9 (2005-2006); TV Clube (2006-2021)
- Former channel numbers: Analog: 9 (VHF, 2000–2018)
- Former affiliations: Rede Bandeirantes (2000-2012)

Technical information
- Licensing authority: ANATEL
- ERP: 12 kW
- Transmitter coordinates: 8°3′6.1″S 34°52′40.6″W

Links
- Public license information: Profile
- Website: www.tvguararapes.com.br

TV Guararapes (channel 9) is a Brazilian television station Recife, capital of the state of Pernambuco. A Record affiliate, the station is owned by Sistema Opinião de Comunicação and has over-the-air coverage across much of the state.

== History ==
The license for VHF channel 9 in Recife (until then occupied by a relay of TV Pernambuco) was granted, after public competition, by president Fernando Henrique Cardoso on December 28, 1998, to Diários Associados, who had been fighting in court for years against the Union over the revocation of the former TV Rádio Clube de Pernambuco license, along with six other stations from Rede Tupi, in July 1980. The station was opened on January 1, 2000, as TV Guararapes, affiliated with Rede Bandeirantes, previously captured by a relay on VHF channel 7 since 1998.

In its early years, the stationmanaged to maintain a partnership with TVI, a production company owned by sports announcer Luciano do Valle, which in addition to sports broadcasts, was responsible for the programs Valle Tudo and Tudo em Dia, the latter a variety program presented by Luciano and his wife, Luciana Mariano.

In 2003, TV Guararapes premiered the program S.O.S Cardinot, presented on Saturdays by Joslei Cardinot, coming from Rádio Clube de Pernambuco. Months later, Cardinot took over presenting the local version of Brasil Urgente. However, in the same year, he left the program after being hired by TV Tribuna, only returning in July 2011.

In September 2005, the station completely abandoned the name TV Guararapes, which had been out of use since August 2004, and began to identify itself simply as Canal 9. On April 3, 2006, it was renamed TV Clube. On January 9, 2012, the station affiliated with Record, due to the latter's problems with TV Tribuna. A party was prepared to celebrate the partnership, and journalist Ana Paula Padrão presented Jornal da Record live from Recife, to mark the new affiliation.

On January 19, 2015, the station had 57.5% of its shares sold by Diários Associados to Sistema Opinião de Comunicação, belonging to Cândido Pinheiro, founder of Grupo Hapvida, who was now responsible for the majority of the broadcaster and other media outlets owned by the company in the Northeast Brazil. In 2019, Sistema Opinião de Comunicação started to hold 100% of the shares.

On January 29, 2018, the broadcaster changed its programming schedule with the extinction of S.O.S Pernambuco on January 26 and the debut of Balanço Geral PE Manhã. PE Direto da Redação moved to weekends and Superesportes became a feature on PE no Ar, in addition to gaining new studios and sets and new graphics following RecordTV standards.

On February 18, 2019, the station debuted new morning programming. With the end of the news program PE no Ar on February 15, Balanço Geral PE Manhã increased its duration to two hours, while Isly Viana started to present the journalist in place of André Estanislau, who would now only do police reports for the program.

On March 9, Agora é Hora was shown for the last time, after presenter Flávio Barra announcing his move to TV Jornal, alongside the program's team. On March 14, it announced a new comedy program for the timeslot, Que Arretado, presented by Amanda Neves, whose preiere was on March 18. On May 13, the local version of Cidade Alerta premiered, presented by André Estanislau.

On May 28, 2021, Fábio Araújo leaves the presentation of Balanço Geral, after being hired by TV Jornal to present a new program in the same time slot. To take his place, TV Clube hired journalist Gernand Lopes, coming from TV Correio in João Pessoa, Paraíba, who took over the program on May 31.

On August 2, the station's name was reverted to TV Guararapes, after the management of Sistema Opinião de Comunicação chose to separate the image of the station from its former owners, Diários Associados, repeating the process done with TV Clube in João Pessoa, Paraíba, which was renamed to TV Manaíra in 2016. With the change, references to the old name were suppressed, including Jornal da Clube, which was renamed Jornal Guararapes.

On December 6, 2021, the station made cuts to its journalism team, dismissing journalist Isly Viana, who presented Jornal Guararapes and had worked on TV Guararapes since 2012. With his departure, the news program was temporarily taken over by reporter Ciro Guimarães, and on February 7, 2022, it began to be presented by Meiry Lanunce, a former member of TV Globo Nordeste.

On April 10, 2025, the station started broadcasting its free-to-air satellite signal on the Ku band in the DTH SAT HD Regional system on virtual channel 7, reaching the entire state.

== Technical information ==
Virtual channel	Digital channel	Screen	Content
9.1	39 UHF	1080i	TV Guararapes/Record's main schedule
