= Horace, Kansas =

City in Greeley County, Kansas

- City
- Location within Greeley County and Kansas

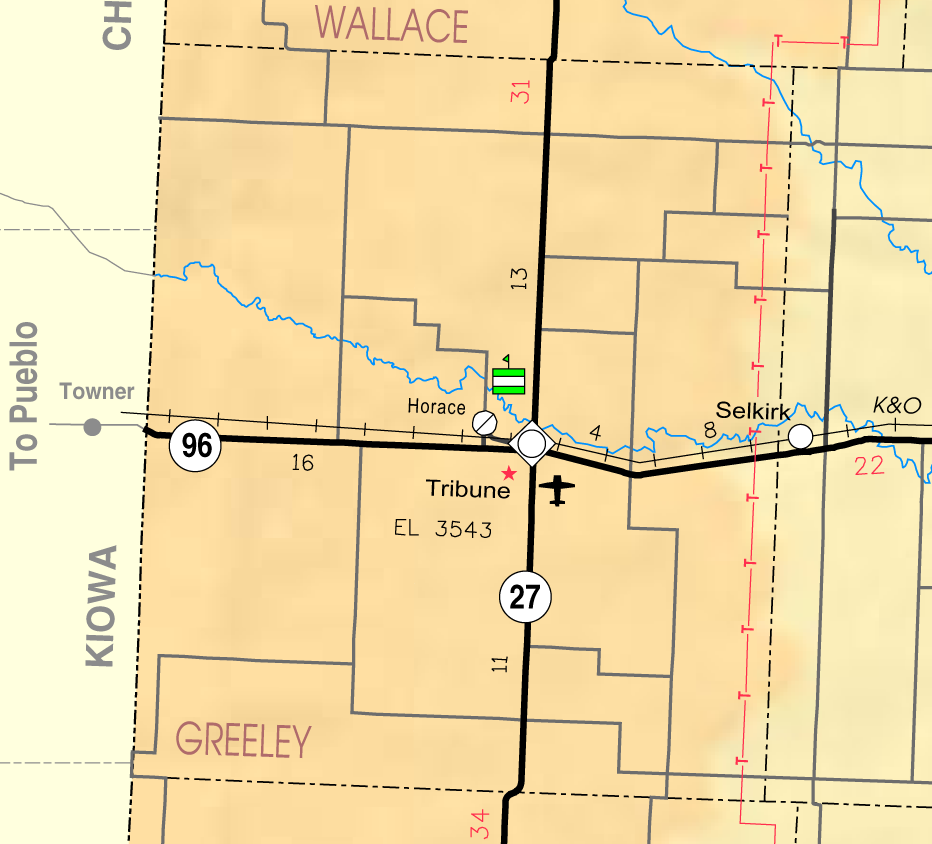
- KDOT map of Greeley County (legend)
- Coordinates: 38°28′37″N 101°47′26″W
- Country: United States
- State: Kansas
- County: Greeley
- Township: Tribune
- Founded: 1886
- Incorporated: 1887
- Named for: Horace Greeley

Area
  - Total: 0.24 sq mi (0.63 km^{2})
  - Land: 0.24 sq mi (0.63 km^{2})
  - Water: 0 sq mi (0.00 km^{2})
- Elevation: 3,642 ft (1,110 m)

Population (2020)
  - Total: 102
  - Density: 420/sq mi (160/km^{2})
- Time zone: UTC-7 (Mountain (MST))
  - Summer (DST): UTC-6 (MDT)
- Area code: 620
- FIPS code: 20-33150
- GNIS ID: 2394420
- Website: City Webpage

Horace is a city in Greeley County, Kansas, United States. As of the 2020 census, the population of the city was 102.

== History ==
Horace was established in 1886 when the Missouri Pacific Railroad passed through the area. The city is named after Horace Greeley of Chappaqua, New York, editor of the New York Tribune. Greeley encouraged western settlement with the motto "Go West, young man".

In 1887, Horace was officially incorporated. When it came time to select the county seat, Horace was a strong candidate, but despite being larger than nearby Tribune, it lost to its eastern neighbor just two miles away. Still, Horace thrived, and by 1888, it had 300 residents, a local newspaper, and a bank.

By the early 1900s, the town featured a brick schoolhouse, a railroad roundhouse, a YMCA building, a hotel, a grocery store, and a Baptist church. None of these buildings remain today.

In 1910, Horace was home to several mercantile businesses, telegraph and express offices, a money order office, and 189 residents. It also continued to serve as a stop on the Missouri Pacific Railroad.

A post office was opened in Horace in 1886. The post office closed on December 30, 1965, and, eventually, the train depot shut down as well.

On November 6, 2007, voters in rural Greeley County and in Tribune approved a consolidation of the county and the city. Horace, however, decided against consolidation.

== Geography ==
According to the United States Census Bureau, the city has a total area of 0.25 square miles (0.65 km^{2}), all land.

== Demographics ==
Historical population
Census	Pop.	Note	%±
1890	150		—
1900	90		−40.0%
1910	189		110.0%
1920	212		12.2%
1930	230		8.5%
1940	234		1.7%
1950	258		10.3%
1960	195		−24.4%
1970	137		−29.7%
1980	137		0.0%
1990	168		22.6%
2000	143		−14.9%
2010	70		−51.0%
2020	102		45.7%
U.S. Decennial Census

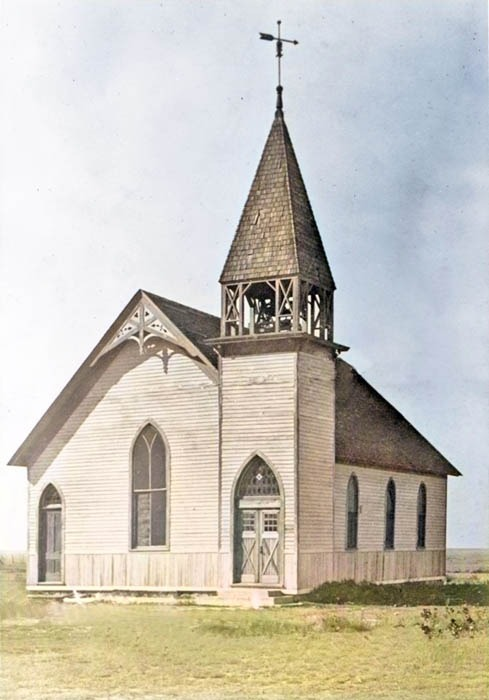
Horace Baptist church in 1905

=== 2020 census ===
The 2020 United States census counted 102 people, 51 households, and 27 families in Horace. The population density was 416.3 per square mile (160.7/km^{2}). There were 64 housing units at an average density of 261.2 per square mile (100.9/km^{2}). The racial makeup was 78.43% (80) white or European American (76.47% non-Hispanic white), 0.0% (0) black or African-American, 0.0% (0) Native American or Alaska Native, 0.98% (1) Asian, 0.0% (0) Pacific Islander or Native Hawaiian, 8.82% (9) from other races, and 11.76% (12) from two or more races. Hispanic or Latino of any race was 12.75% (13) of the population.

Of the 51 households, 25.5% had children under the age of 18; 39.2% were married couples living together; 25.5% had a female householder with no spouse or partner present. 43.1% of households consisted of individuals and 19.6% had someone living alone who was 65 years of age or older. The average household size was 2.7 and the average family size was 3.3. The percent of those with a bachelor's degree or higher was estimated to be 1.0% of the population.

18.6% of the population was under the age of 18, 4.9% from 18 to 24, 29.4% from 25 to 44, 27.5% from 45 to 64, and 19.6% who were 65 years of age or older. The median age was 43.5 years. For every 100 females, there were 85.5 males. For every 100 females ages 18 and older, there were 93.0 males.

The 2016–2020 5-year American Community Survey estimates show that the median household income was $25,357 (with a margin of error of +/- $16,283) and the median family income was $25,893 (+/- $11,233). Approximately, 23.1% of families and 42.9% of the population were below the poverty line, including 75.0% of those under the age of 18 and 0.0% of those ages 65 or over.

=== 2010 census ===
As of the census of 2010, there were 70 people, 33 households, and 22 families residing in the city. The population density was 280.0 inhabitants per square mile (108.1/km^{2}). There were 47 housing units at an average density of 188.0 per square mile (72.6/km^{2}). The racial makeup of the city was 94.3% White, 2.9% African American, and 2.9% from two or more races. Hispanic or Latino of any race were 5.7% of the population.

There were 33 households, of which 30.3% had children under the age of 18 living with them, 54.5% were married couples living together, 9.1% had a female householder with no husband present, 3.0% had a male householder with no wife present, and 33.3% were non-families. 33.3% of all households were made up of individuals, and 3% had someone living alone who was 65 years of age or older. The average household size was 2.12 and the average family size was 2.68.

The median age in the city was 46.6 years. 22.9% of residents were under the age of 18; 4.2% were between the ages of 18 and 24; 15.7% were from 25 to 44; 41.5% were from 45 to 64; and 15.7% were 65 years of age or older. The gender makeup of the city was 47.1% male and 52.9% female.

== Economy ==
Horace has two grain elevator complexes and a spray fertilizer company.

== Education ==
The community is served by Greeley County USD 200 public school district, located in the city of Tribune.
