= Harrison Township, Greeley County, Kansas =

Harrison Township
- Township
- Location in Greeley County
- Coordinates: 38°21′52″N 101°41′48″W
- Country: United States
- State: Kansas
- County: Greeley

Area
  - Total: 197.1 sq mi (510.5 km^{2})
  - Land: 197.1 sq mi (510.5 km^{2})
  - Water: 0 sq mi (0 km^{2}) 0%
- Elevation: 3,570 ft (1,088 m)

Population (2000)
  - Total: 107
  - Density: 0.52/sq mi (0.2/km^{2})
- GNIS feature ID: 0471494

Harrison Township was a township in Greeley County, Kansas, United States. As of the 2000 census, its population of the former township was 107.

== Geography ==
Harrison Township covered an area of 197.11 square miles (510.5 km^{2}) and contains no incorporated settlements. According to the USGS, it contains one cemetery, Greely County.

Greeley County was previously divided into three townships. However, in 1992, Colony Township and Harrison Township were merged into Tribune Township, leaving only one township for the county. This was not reported to the U.S. census until 2006, thus the 2000 census did not reflect the merger, but the 2010 census did.

== Transportation ==
Harrison Township contained one airport or landing strip, Tribune Municipal Airport.
