= Colony Township, Kansas =

Colony Township
- Township
- Location in Greeley County
- Coordinates: 38°31′25″N 101°56′17″W
- Country: United States
- State: Kansas
- County: Greeley

Area
  - Total: 354.77 sq mi (918.86 km^{2})
  - Land: 354.77 sq mi (918.86 km^{2})
  - Water: 0 sq mi (0 km^{2}) 0%
- Elevation: 3,812 ft (1,162 m)

Population (2000)
  - Total: 172
  - Density: 0.52/sq mi (0.2/km^{2})
- GNIS feature ID: 0485231

Colony Township was a township in Greeley County, Kansas, United States. As of the 2000 census, the population of the former township was 172.

== Geography ==
Colony Township covered an area of 354.77 square miles (918.9 km^{2}) and contained no incorporated settlements. According to the USGS, it contains two cemeteries: Mathews and Rogers.

The stream of South Fork White Woman Creek runs through this township.

Greeley County was previously divided into three townships. However, in 1992, Colony Township and Harrison Township were merged into Tribune Township, leaving only one township for the county. This was not reported to the U.S. census until 2006, thus the 2000 census did not reflect the merger, but the 2010 census did.

== Transportation ==
Colony Township contained two airports or landing strips: Tuttle Landing Field and Walter Airport.
