= La Tribune (disambiguation) =

La Tribune is a French financial newspaper.

La Tribune may also refer to:

- La Tribune de Genève, Swiss newspaper
- La Tribune (Sherbrooke), Quebec, Canada

== See also ==
- Tribune (disambiguation)
- The Tribune (disambiguation)
- La Tribuna (disambiguation)
