= La Tribuna =

La Tribuna may refer to:

- La Tribuna (Honduras), a Honduran newspaper
- La Tribuna (Paraguay), a Paraguayan newspaper
- La Tribuna di Treviso, an Italian newspaper

== See also ==
- Tribuna (disambiguation)
- La Tribune (disambiguation)
