= Horace Greeley Museum =

- Greeley County Courthouse
- U.S. National Register of Historic Places
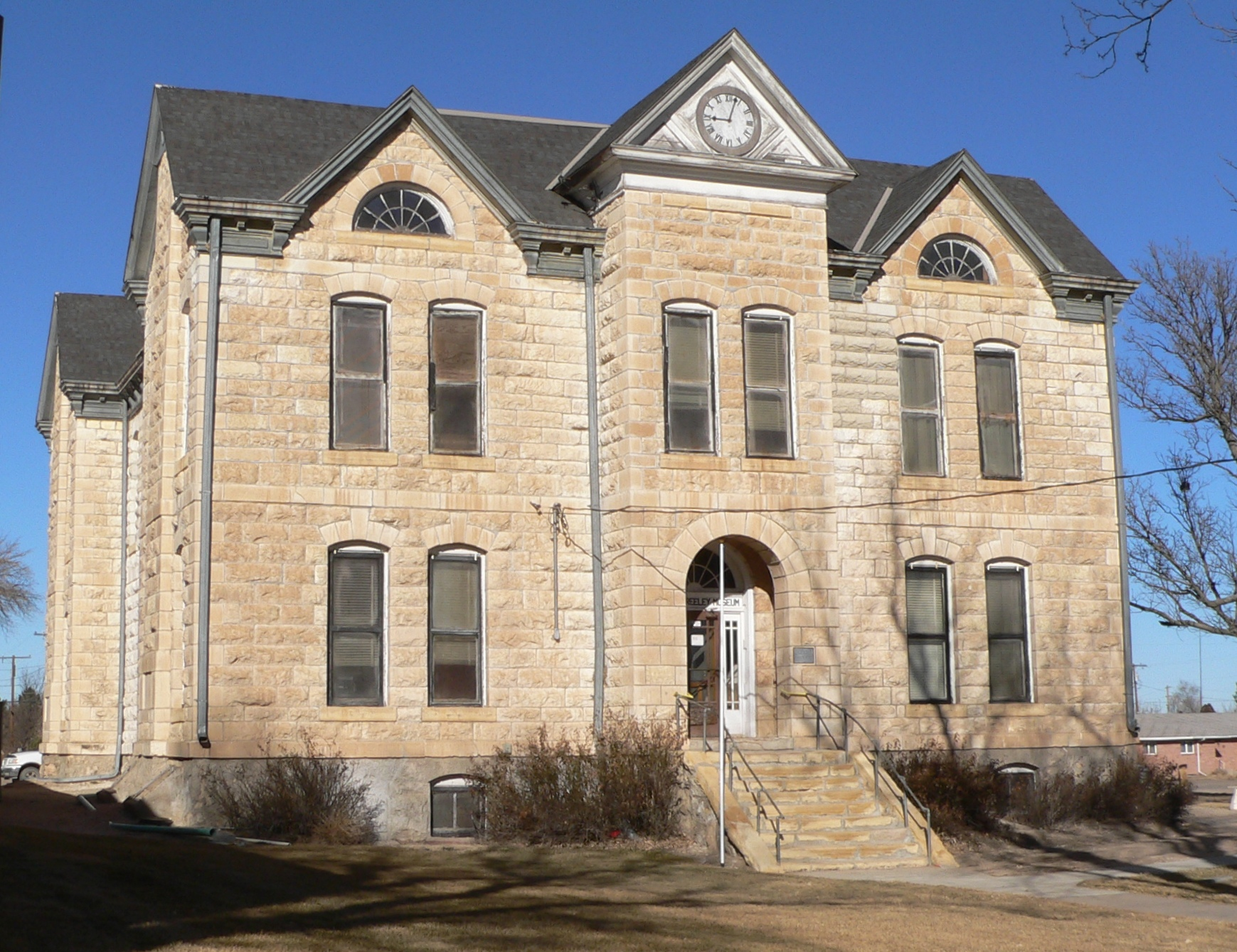

- Location within Kansas Location within the United States
- Location: 616 Harper Street, Tribune, Kansas
- Coordinates: 38°28′17″N 101°45′0″W
- Built: 1889-1890
- Architect: William T. Heaps
- NRHP reference No.: 76000821
- Added to NRHP: July 12, 1976

The Old Greeley County Courthouse in Tribune, Kansas, is the former courthouse of Greeley County, Kansas. Built from 1889 to 1890, the courthouse was the first in Greeley County. Construction started only a year after the county was formed in 1888. William T. Heaps, who also designed Hamilton County's courthouse, designed the building. The sandstone courthouse has a plain design with an iron cornice. It was constructed by Allen and Oleson of Ness City, Kansas and William Ruff.

In 1975, Greeley County replaced the courthouse with a new building adjacent to the old one. The old courthouse became the Greeley County Historical Society Museum, which in 2021 is the Horace Greeley Museum.

The courthouse was listed on the National Register of Historic Places in 1976.
