= Michael Gartner =

American journalist, attorney and businessman (born 1938)

Michael Gartner (born October 25, 1938, in Des Moines, Iowa) is an American journalist, attorney and businessman. He was president of the Iowa Board of Regents.

== Biography ==
A graduate of Carleton College and the New York University School of Law, Gartner was a member of the New York and Iowa bars as of 1997. His career in journalism began in the sports department of the Des Moines Register at the age of 15. After completing his undergraduate degree, he joined the staff of The Wall Street Journal (1960–1974), ultimately serving as page one editor. He then served as editor and president of the Des Moines Register (1974–1985), general news executive of the Gannett Company and USA Today (1985–1986), editor of the Louisville Courier-Journal (1986–1987) and president of NBC News (1988–1993). He was president of the American Society of Newspaper Editors from 1988 to 1993.

As chair and editor of The Daily Tribune in Ames, Iowa from 1993 to 1999 (which he also co-owned from 1986 to 1999), Gartner won the 1997 Pulitzer Prize for Editorial Writing for a body of work about community issues. He previously served as a member of the Pulitzer Prize Board from 1983 to 1992. He has also been a columnist for the Op-Ed pages of The Wall Street Journal and of USA Today.

Gartner chaired the Vision Iowa fund, which provided communities money to fund projects such as the Iowa Events Center in Des Moines, from 2000 to 2005. In May 2005, Iowa Gov. Tom Vilsack named him president of the Iowa Board of Regents, which oversees the state's three public universities (the University of Iowa, Iowa State University, and the University of Northern Iowa). He served until December 2007. Gartner is chairman of Raccoon Baseball, Inc., which owned the Iowa Cubs baseball team from 1999 to 2021, and formerly was co-owner of Big Green Umbrella. When the Iowa Cubs were sold to Endeavor he and the other owners shared the proceeds with their full-time staff.

== Dateline controversy ==
He resigned from NBC in 1993 as a result of controversy over the show Dateline NBC. The show reported on dangers of GM pickup trucks, but did not state that it had actually staged the explosion of a truck for broadcast.

Years later Gartner said, "It happened on my watch. I took responsibility for it. I did what I thought you ought to do when you make a mistake. You say 'we made a mistake' and apologize to the viewers." (Iowa City Press-Citizen, April 23, 2005.)

== See also ==
- Journalism scandals
