= Tribune Township, Kansas =

Tribune Township
- Township
- Tribune Township prior to 1992 merger
- Coordinates: 38°34′55″N 101°41′50″W
- Country: United States
- State: Kansas
- County: Greeley

Area
  - Total: 226.12 sq mi (585.66 km^{2})
  - Land: 226.12 sq mi (585.66 km^{2})
  - Water: 0 sq mi (0 km^{2}) 0%
- Elevation: 3,599 ft (1,097 m)

Population (2020)
  - Total: 1,284
  - Density: 5.678/sq mi (2.192/km^{2})
- GNIS feature ID: 0485352

Tribune Township is the sole township in Greeley County, Kansas, United States. As of the 2020 census, its population was 1,284.

== Geography ==
Prior to 1992, Tribune Township covered an area of 226.13 square miles (585.7 km^{2}) and contained the incorporated settlements of Tribune (the county seat) and Horace. According to the USGS, it contains one cemetery, Bethany.

The streams of Middle Ladder Creek and South Ladder Creek run through this township.

Greeley County was previously divided into three townships. However, in 1992, Colony Township and Harrison Township were merged into Tribune Township, leaving only one township for the county. This was not reported to the U.S. census until 2006, thus the 2000 census did not reflect the merger, but the 2010 census did.

In the 2000 U.S. census, the population within the former boundaries of Tribune Township was reported as 1,255. By the 2010 census, the entire county population (which is co-extensive with Tribune Township) was 1,247.
