= The Tribune =

The Tribune or Tribune is the name of various newspapers:

== United States ==
=== Daily ===
==== California ====
- Oakland Tribune
- The Tribune (San Luis Obispo)
- The San Diego Union-Tribune
- San Gabriel Valley Tribune

==== Indiana ====
- Kokomo Tribune
- News and Tribune, New Albany, formerly called The Tribune
- Peru Tribune
- The Tribune, Seymour
- South Bend Tribune
- Tribune-Star, Terre Haute, a successor to the Terre Haute Tribune

==== Iowa ====
- Ames Tribune
- Des Moines Tribune

==== Ohio ====
- Coshocton Tribune
- Ironton Tribune

==== Pennsylvania ====
- The Meadville Tribune
- Philadelphia Tribune

==== Other ====
- The Albuquerque Tribune, New Mexico
- Bismarck Tribune, North Dakota
- Casper Tribune, Wyoming
- Chicago Tribune, Illinois
- Columbia Daily Tribune, Missouri, also called the Tribune
- Duluth News Tribune, Newspaper in Duluth, Minnesota
- East Valley Tribune, serving the East Valley region of metropolitan Phoenix, Arizona, a merger of the Mesa Tribune and Gilbert Tribune
- Grand Haven Tribune, Michigan
- Great Falls Tribune, Montana
- Greeley Tribune, Colorado
- Hastings Tribune, Nebraska
- La Crosse Tribune, Wisconsin
- The Salt Lake Tribune, Utah
- The Tampa Tribune, Florida
- Texas Tribune, Texas

=== Weekly and semi-weekly ===
- Bay City Tribune, Texas
- The Tribune (Elkin, North Carolina)
- Hillsboro Tribune, Oregon
- The Marquette Tribune, Wisconsin
- New Orleans Tribune, Louisiana
- Phoenix Tribune, Arizona
- Portland Tribune, Oregon
- The Pratt Tribune, Kansas
- Savannah Tribune, Georgia

=== Defunct ===
- Altoona Tribune (1856–1957), Pennsylvania
- Detroit Tribune (1849–1862), Michigan
- Los Angeles Tribune (1886–1890), published from 1886 to 1890 by Henry H. Boyce
- Los Angeles Tribune (1911–1918), published from 1911 to 1918 by Edwin T. Earl
- Los Angeles Tribune (1941–1960), published from 1941 to 1960 by Almena Lomax
- New York Tribune (1841–1924), New York
- Scranton Tribune, Pennsylvania (ceased publication in 2005)
- Tulsa Tribune (1919–1992), Oklahoma
- Charlottesville-Albemarle Tribune (1954–1992), Virginia

== Other countries ==
Ordered by country first.

=== Active ===
- The Tribune, Nassau, Bahamas—see List of newspapers in the Bahamas
- Bahrain Tribune, now Daily Tribune, Bahrain
- Dhaka Tribune, Bangladesh, an English-language daily newspaper
- Burundi Tribune, Bujumbura, Burundi
- Cameroon Tribune, a Cameroonian government-owned newspaper
- The Minnedosa Tribune, Manitoba, Canada, a weekly
- Guelph Tribune, Ontario, Canada
- The Tribune (McGill), a weekly student newspaper published by the Students' Society of McGill University in Montreal, Quebec, Canada
- Welland Tribune, a daily newspaper that services Welland, Ontario and surrounding area
- The Tribune (India), a daily newspaper published in Chandigarh, India
- Assam Tribune, Assam, India
- Sunday Tribune, a weekly newspaper published in Dublin, Ireland
- Connacht Tribune, a weekly newspaper published in Galway, Ireland
- Madagascar Tribune, a daily newspaper published in Antananarivo, Madagascar
- Tribune, monthly magazine of the youth wing of the Dutch Socialist Party
- Nigerian Tribune, published in Ibadan, Nigeria
- Saipan Tribune, Northern Mariana Islands
- Qatar Tribune, Qatar
- Tribune de Genève, a newspaper published in Geneva, Switzerland
- Harare Tribune, an online daily newspaper published in Zimbabwe

=== Defunct ===
- Tribune (Australian newspaper), former newspaper of the Communist Party of Australia
- The Tribune (Melbourne), Catholic weekly in Australia
- Winnipeg Tribune (1890–1980), Winnipeg, Manitoba, Canada
- Sarawak Tribune, (1945–2006), a newspaper published in Sarawak, Malaysia
- Tribune (Liberal Party newspaper), official UK Liberal party newspaper

== Other newspapers ==
(combined titles including the word Tribune)

US

- Ballard News-Tribune, Seattle, Washington
- Journal Tribune, Biddeford, Maine
- Mail Tribune, Medford, Oregon
- The News Tribune, Tacoma, Washington
- New York Herald Tribune (1924–1966), New York
- New York World Journal Tribune (1966–1967), New York
- Post-Tribune, northwest Indiana
- Pittsburgh Tribune-Review, Pennsylvania
- The San Diego Union-Tribune, California
- Sarasota Herald-Tribune, Florida
- Star Tribune, Minneapolis, Minnesota
- The Times-Tribune (Corbin), Kentucky
- The Times-Tribune (Scranton), Pennsylvania
- Waco Tribune-Herald, Texas
- The Tribune-Democrat, Johnstown, Pennsylvania
- The Tribune-Democrat (La Junta), Colorado

Other countries

- Asian Tribune, an online publication based in Sweden
- The Express Tribune, a daily English-language newspaper published in Karachi, Pakistan
- International Herald Tribune, a daily English-language international newspaper headquartered in Paris, France
- Islington Tribune, the independent London newspaper

== See also ==
- Daily Tribune (disambiguation)
- Tribune (disambiguation)
- Tribune (magazine), a weekly magazine (previously a newspaper) published in London, England
