= Greeley County, Kansas =

County in Kansas, United States

- Consolidated city-county
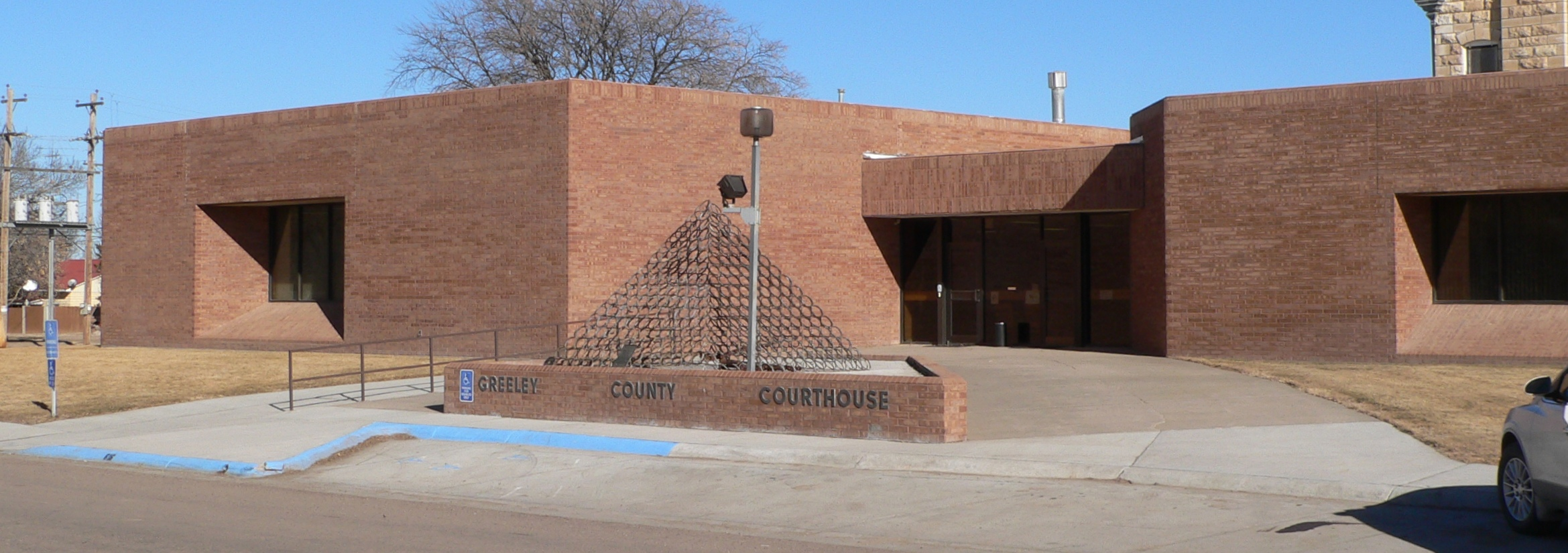
- Greeley County Courthouse in Tribune (2010)

- Logo
- Motto: "Life as it should be"
- Location within the U.S. state of Kansas
- Coordinates: 38°28′00″N 101°49′59″W
- Country: United States
- State: Kansas
- Founded: March 20, 1873
- Named for: Horace Greeley
- Seat: Tribune
- Largest city: Tribune

Area
  - Total: 778 sq mi (2,020 km^{2})
  - Land: 778 sq mi (2,020 km^{2})
  - Water: 0.0 sq mi (0 km^{2}) 0.0%

Population (2020)
  - Total: 1,284
  - Estimate (2025): 1,182 ▼
  - Density: 1.65/sq mi (0.637/km^{2})
- Time zone: UTC−7 (Mountain)
  - Summer (DST): UTC−6 (MDT)
- Congressional district: 1st
- Website: greeleycounty.org

Greeley County is a county located in western Kansas, in the Central United States. Its county seat and largest city is Tribune. As of the 2020 census, the population was 1,284, making it the least populous county in Kansas. As of 2018, it is tied with Wallace County as the least densely populated county in the state. The county is named after Horace Greeley, editor of the New York Tribune, who encouraged western settlement with the motto "Go West, young man".

== History ==
In 1854, the Kansas Territory was organized, and Kansas became the 34th U.S. state in 1861. In 1873, Greeley County was established. It was the last county in the state to be organized, which finally occurred in July 1888 after a lawsuit to stop organization on the basis of insufficient population was dismissed. Tribune was named the temporary county seat, defeating Horace in an election held that November.

Settlement in Greeley County was sparse until 1885, when the influx of settlers led to numerous town claims, with Horace, Tribune, and Reid among the settlements that boasted banks, newspapers, and basic amenities. The Missouri Pacific Railroad's arrival in 1887, with a depot at Tribune, facilitated further development. By 1910, the population had significantly increased, leading to the establishment of 13 school districts and a scattering of post offices including at Tribune, Horace, Hurt, Sidney, Thelma, and Youngville.

== Geography ==
According to the United States Census Bureau, the county has a total area of 778 square miles (2,020 km^{2}), all of which is land. It is the largest of five United States counties and twelve (Virginia) independent cities that officially have no water area.

The county's landscape is predominantly prairie, with an elevation between 3,000 and 4,000 feet. White Woman Creek, the county's most notable watercourse, often runs dry.

=== Adjacent counties ===
- Wallace County (north)
- Wichita County (east/Central Time border)
- Hamilton County (south)
- Prowers County, Colorado (southwest)
- Kiowa County, Colorado (west)
- Cheyenne County, Colorado (northwest)

== Demographics ==
Historical population
Census	Pop.	Note	%±
1890	1,264		—
1900	493		−61.0%
1910	1,335		170.8%
1920	1,028		−23.0%
1930	1,712		66.5%
1940	1,638		−4.3%
1950	2,010		22.7%
1960	2,087		3.8%
1970	1,819		−12.8%
1980	1,845		1.4%
1990	1,774		−3.8%
2000	1,534		−13.5%
2010	1,247		−18.7%
2020	1,284		3.0%
2025 (est.)	1,182	▼	−7.9%
U.S. Decennial Census; 1790-1960 1900-1990; 1990-2000 2010-2020

=== 2020 census ===
As of the 2020 census, the county had a population of 1,284. The median age was 40.3 years, 25.5% of residents were under the age of 18, and 20.7% of residents were 65 years of age or older. For every 100 females there were 98.8 males, and for every 100 females age 18 and over there were 98.8 males age 18 and over. 0.0% of residents lived in urban areas, while 100.0% lived in rural areas.

The racial makeup of the county was 83.7% White, 0.2% Black or African American, 0.9% American Indian and Alaska Native, 0.4% Asian, 0.1% Native Hawaiian and Pacific Islander, 6.5% from some other race, and 8.2% from two or more races. Hispanic or Latino residents of any race comprised 15.5% of the population.

There were 531 households in the county, of which 28.4% had children under the age of 18 living with them and 23.0% had a female householder with no spouse or partner present. About 31.1% of all households were made up of individuals and 17.3% had someone living alone who was 65 years of age or older.

There were 638 housing units, of which 16.8% were vacant. Among occupied housing units, 72.9% were owner-occupied and 27.1% were renter-occupied. The homeowner vacancy rate was 4.2% and the rental vacancy rate was 15.7%.

=== 2000 census ===
As of the census of 2000, there were 1,534 people, 602 households, and 414 families residing in the county. The population density was 2 people per square mile (0.77 people/km^{2}). There were 712 housing units at an average density of 1 per square mile (0.39/km^{2}). The racial makeup of the county was 93.09% White, 0.26% Native American, 0.20% Black or African American, 0.13% Pacific Islander, 0.07% Asian, 5.22% from other races, and 1.04% from two or more races. Hispanic or Latino of any race were 11.54% of the population.

There were 602 households, out of which 34.20% had children under the age of 18 living with them, 61.10% were married couples living together, 4.50% had a female householder with no husband present, and 31.20% were non-families. 28.60% of all households were made up of individuals, and 12.80% had someone living alone who was 65 years of age or older. The average household size was 2.50 and the average family size was 3.10.

In the county, the population was spread out, with 28.20% under the age of 18, 6.80% from 18 to 24, 27.30% from 25 to 44, 19.90% from 45 to 64, and 17.70% who were 65 years of age or older. The median age was 39 years. For every 100 females there were 98.40 males. For every 100 females age 18 and over, there were 92.80 males.

The median income for a household in the county was $34,605, and the median income for a family was $45,625. Males had a median income of $29,018 versus $18,984 for females. The per capita income for the county was $19,974. About 8.20% of families and 11.60% of the population were below the poverty line, including 14.20% of those under age 18 and 6.80% of those age 65 or over.

== Government ==
=== County ===
As of January 1, 2009, Greeley County and the City of Tribune have operated as a unified government. The resulting government consists of a five-member commission with two members elected by city residents, two by rural residents, and one at-large. Similar to Wyandotte County, the only other consolidated city-county in the state, part of the county was not included: Horace decided against consolidation.

=== Presidential elections ===
This county is often carried by Republican candidates, as are most rural western Kansas counties. The last time a Democratic candidate won the county was in 1976, and a Democratic candidate has only won the county three times in its history: 1932 (Franklin D. Roosevelt), 1964 (Lyndon B. Johnson), and most recently in 1976 by Jimmy Carter.

Presidential election results

United States presidential election results for Greeley County, Kansas
Year	Republican		Democratic		Third party(ies)	
Year	No.	%	No.	%	No.	%
1888	422	59.02%	180	25.17%	113	15.80%
1892	241	67.89%	0	0.00%	114	32.11%
1896	121	60.80%	76	38.19%	2	1.01%
1900	118	75.64%	36	23.08%	2	1.28%
1904	149	85.63%	14	8.05%	11	6.32%
1908	206	64.58%	89	27.90%	24	7.52%
1912	95	35.58%	33	12.36%	139	52.06%
1916	210	43.57%	168	34.85%	104	21.58%
1920	273	69.47%	93	23.66%	27	6.87%
1924	357	64.21%	75	13.49%	124	22.30%
1928	439	78.25%	121	21.57%	1	0.18%
1932	359	42.64%	440	52.26%	43	5.11%
1936	396	50.45%	388	49.43%	1	0.13%
1940	497	64.55%	268	34.81%	5	0.65%
1944	378	63.00%	215	35.83%	7	1.17%
1948	391	53.34%	326	44.47%	16	2.18%
1952	725	79.06%	181	19.74%	11	1.20%
1956	599	77.09%	174	22.39%	4	0.51%
1960	645	70.57%	262	28.67%	7	0.77%
1964	388	44.80%	469	54.16%	9	1.04%
1968	465	59.85%	227	29.21%	85	10.94%
1972	639	68.49%	212	22.72%	82	8.79%
1976	389	43.42%	479	53.46%	28	3.13%
1980	600	63.36%	235	24.82%	112	11.83%
1984	699	73.27%	227	23.79%	28	2.94%
1988	506	59.32%	317	37.16%	30	3.52%
1992	504	57.73%	191	21.88%	178	20.39%
1996	567	71.95%	161	20.43%	60	7.61%
2000	628	78.21%	143	17.81%	32	3.99%
2004	584	79.46%	138	18.78%	13	1.77%
2008	591	79.33%	151	20.27%	3	0.40%
2012	543	81.04%	113	16.87%	14	2.09%
2016	534	82.15%	83	12.77%	33	5.08%
2020	549	85.65%	78	12.17%	14	2.18%
2024	510	86.00%	75	12.65%	8	1.35%

=== Laws ===
The Kansas Constitution was amended in 1986 to allow the sale of alcoholic liquor by the individual drink with the approval of voters. Greeley County remained a prohibition, or "dry", county until 2008, when voters approved to allow sales of liquor by the drink.

== Education ==
=== Unified school districts ===
- Greeley County USD 200

== Communities ==
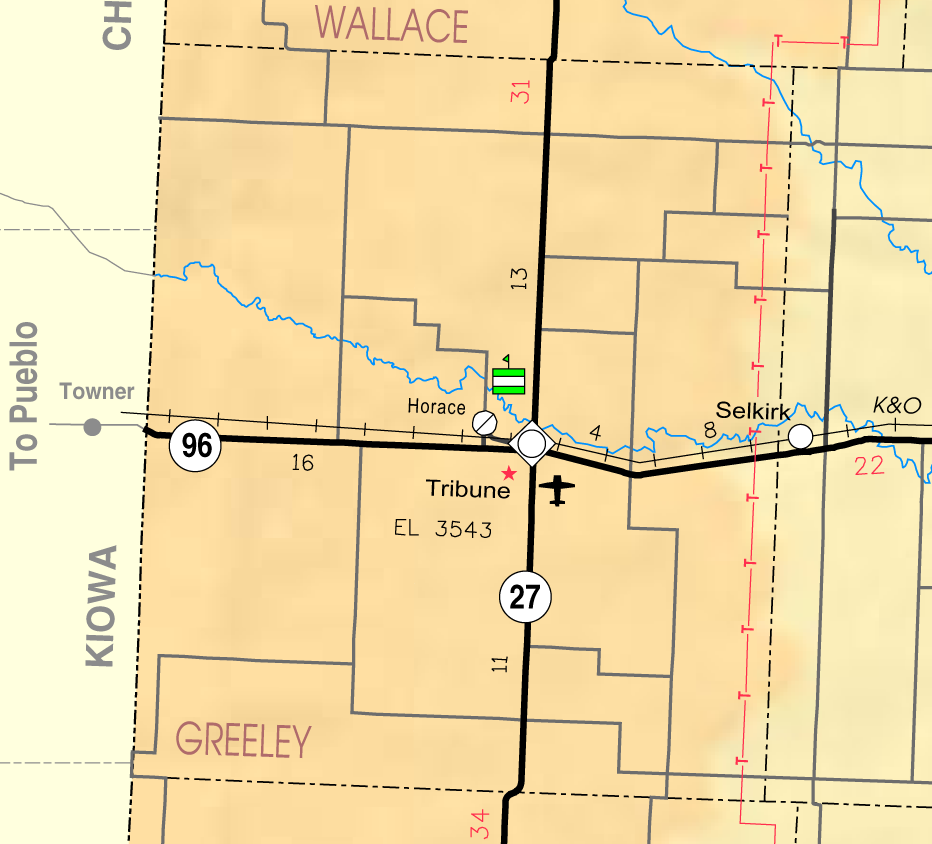
2005 map of Greeley County (map legend)

List of townships / incorporated cities / unincorporated communities / extinct former communities within Greeley County.

=== Cities ===
- Horace
- Tribune (county seat)

=== Ghost towns ===
- Astor
- Colokan
- Hector
- Walkinghood
- Whitelaw

=== Townships ===
Greeley County was previously divided into three townships. However, in 1992, Colony Township and Harrison Township were merged into Tribune Township, leaving only one township for the county. This was not reported to the U.S. census until 2006, thus the 2000 census did not reflect the merger, but the 2010 census did.

None of the cities within the county are considered governmentally independent, and all figures for the townships include those of the cities. In the following table, the population center is the largest city (or cities) included in that township's population total, if it is of a significant size.

Township	FIPS	Population center	Population	Population density /km^{2} (/sq mi)	Land area km^{2} (sq mi)	Water area km^{2} (sq mi)	Water %	Geographic coordinates
Colony	14975		172	0 (0)	919 (355)	0 (0)	0%	38°28′10″N 101°55′42″W
Harrison	30325		107	0 (1)	511 (197)	0 (0)	0%	38°21′25″N 101°41′14″W
Tribune	71475	Tribune	1,255	2 (6)	586 (226)	0 (0)	0%	38°31′51″N 101°44′36″W
Sources: "Census 2000 U.S. Gazetteer Files". U.S. Census Bureau, Geography Division. Archived from the original on August 2, 2002.

== In popular culture ==
Greeley County appears in several episodes of the television series Prison Break.

== See also ==
- Horace Greeley Museum, home in Tribune of the Greeley County Historical Society

Community information for Kansas

- Kansas locations by per capita income
- List of counties in Kansas
- List of townships in Kansas
- List of cities in Kansas
- List of unincorporated communities in Kansas
- List of ghost towns in Kansas
