= Astor, Kansas =

Ghost town in Greeley County, Kansas

Astor is a ghost town in Greeley County, Kansas, United States. It was located at 38.4727937°N 101.9029544°W.

== History ==
The post office in Astor closed in 1896.

== See also ==
- List of ghost towns in Kansas
