= Greeley County USD 200 =

Public school district in Tribune, Kansas

Address
- 400 W. Lawrence Street Tribune, Kansas, 67879; United States
- Coordinates: 38.4722°N 101.7568°W

District information
- Type: Public
- Grades: K to 12
- Schools: 2

Other information
- Website: www.usd200.org

Greeley County USD 200 is a public unified school district headquartered in Tribune, Kansas, United States. The district includes the communities of Tribune, Horace, and rural areas of Greeley County.

== Schools ==
The school district operates the following schools:

- Greeley County Jr/Sr High School
- Greeley County Elementary School

== See also ==
- List of high schools in Kansas
- List of unified school districts in Kansas
