= Daily Tribune =

Daily Tribune may refer to the following newspapers:

- Daily Tribune (Philippines), an English-language broadsheet
- Daily Tribune (Bahrain), also known as News of Bahrain

== United States ==
- Daily Tribune (Ames, Iowa), now The Ames Tribune
- Daily Tribune (Oklahoma, 1915–1939), merged into the Blackwell Journal-Tribune
- Daily Tribune (Wyoming, 1916–1925), merged into the Casper Star-Tribune
- Daily Tribune (Michigan, 1849–1862), merged into the Detroit Tribune
- Wisconsin Rapids Daily Tribune
