= TV SIM =

TV SIM (ZYP 601)
- Vitória, Espírito Santo; Brazil
- Channels: Digital: 16 (UHF); Virtual: 10

Programming
- Affiliations: SBT

Ownership
- Owner: Rede Capixaba de Comunicação (Grupo Sá Cavalcante) Rede SIM; (Televisão Capixaba Ltda.)

History
- First air date: October 10, 1989
- Former call signs: ZYA 535 (1989-2017)
- Former names: TV Capixaba (1989-2024)
- Former channel numbers: Analog: 10 (VHF, 1989-2018)
- Former affiliations: Rede Bandeirantes (1989-2024)

Technical information
- Licensing authority: ANATEL
- ERP: 0,2 kW
- Transmitter coordinates: 20°18′30.5″S 40°20′26.5″W

Links
- Public license information: Profile
- Website: es360.com.br/categoria/tv-capixaba

TV SIM (channel 10) is a Brazilian television station in Vitória, Espírito Santo, serving as an affiliate of the SBT television network for the entire state. The station is the flagship broadcasting property of the locally based Rede Capixaba de Comunicação, the media arm of Grupo Sá Cavalcante, in addition to being part of Rui Baromeu's Rede SIM since 20 December 2024, through a joint venture agreement, it generates its programming for around 80% of Espírito Santo. Its studios are located in the Centro Empresarial Shopping Praia da Costa Offices, in the neighborhood of the same name, while its transmission antenna is in Morro da Fonte Grande, in Vitória.

== History ==
The station was founded on October 10, 1989, by Walter de Sá Cavalcante, owner of Grupo Sá Cavalcante, the largest business group in the state of Espírito Santo, which is responsible for 4 shopping malls in the Metropolitan Region of Vitória, the Bob's and Spoleto franchises in Espírito Santo, in addition to several other construction projects across the country. Since its creation, the station has maintained its affiliation with Rede Bandeirantes.

The station was initially granted a UHF license from the government, to contest the situation, Rui Barromeu held talks with the communications minister in Brasília and demanded the license to be relocated to VHF channel 10.

As of 2019, TV Capixaba produced 16 local programs. The news operation ended in December 2019, raising concerns about the future of its license.

On May 18, 2023, SBT executives announced their intention not to renew their contract with TV Tribuna after 38 years, citing allegations of the station's facilities being scrapped, in addition to the lack of expansion of the digital signal and the judicial recovery process of the companies of the João Santos Group, with the decision being announced on the 31st. The change of brands was initially scheduled for July 1 of that year.

Despite the decision, Rede Tribuna initiated legal proceedings against Grupo Silvio Santos in June of that year, claiming that the affiliation with SBT was important to keep the channel's accounts up to date and its departure would end up resulting in layoffs, going through several twists and turns, until Tribuna received a favorable opinion from the Court of Justice of Pernambuco, maintaining the partnership with SBT on a judicial basis. The São Paulo broadcaster had already reached a five-year agreement with Rede SIM, which took the case to the Superior Court of Justice (STJ) for recognition of the partnership and for the trial to be held by the Court of Justice of São Paulo and not in Pernambuco, which had given a favorable opinion to Tribuna, but the case was dismissed.

On December 8, 2024, it was initially announced that the broadcaster would start retransmitting the Record News signal, ending a 39-year partnership with Band, which will now be retransmitted by TV Tribuna. The change will take effect on January 1, 2025. The information was confirmed the following day (9) after a meeting between TV Capixaba, Tribuna and Rede SIM, the latter becoming an affiliate of SBT after the end of the legal dispute between the João Santos and Silvio Santos groups, which had lasted two years.

On the 20th, a joint venture agreement was announced between Rede SIM and Rede Capixaba de Comunicação for the retransmission of SBT in Espírito Santo, resulting in a merger of TV Capixaba with Rede SIM, while Record News would continue to be retransmitted on frequency 8.1, through the affiliate Record News Espírito Santo. On the 27th, the frequency of channel 10.1 in Vitória stopped carrying the name TV Capixaba on the devices, starting to use the name Rede SIM, but still retransmitting Band's programming and independent productions, while local programming was suspended due to the transition of broadcasters, as well as the broadcaster's new channels were announced. In the first minute of 2025, the broadcaster ceased broadcasting Band and began broadcasting SBT's programming during the Vira Brasil 2025 special.

== Technical information ==
Virtual channel	Digital channel	Screen	Content
10.1	16 UHF	1080i	Main TV SIM programming/SBT

TV SIM (as TV Capixaba) shut down its analog broadcasts on UHF channel 15 on October 25, 2017, in accordance with ANATEL's roadmap.
