= Tribune Studios =

Tribune Studios may refer to:

- The division of Tribune Entertainment which was trademarked on November 17, 2006 then sold off in 2008 and renamed Sunset Bronson Studios.
- A division of Tribune Broadcasting launched in 2013.
