= Ames Tribune =

Newspaper

The Ames Tribune

- The Ames Tribune, Sunday, July 26, 2015
- Type: Daily newspaper (except Monday)
- Owner: USA Today Co.
- Founded: 1868 as The Intelligencer
- Language: English
- Headquarters: 210 5th Street; Ames, Iowa 50010
- Circulation: 2,982
- ISSN: 1096-8202
- Website: amestrib.com

The Ames Tribune is a newspaper published Sunday, Wednesday and Friday and is based in Ames, Iowa. The newspaper is owned by USA Today Co.

== History ==
In 1986, the Tribune was bought by Michael Gartner and Gary Gerlach, two former executives at The Des Moines Register. Gartner won the 1997 Pulitzer Prize for Editorial Writing at the Tribune. The Omaha World-Herald Company bought the Ames Tribune in 1999 from Gartner, Gerlach, and the estate of David Belin. Stephens Media purchased the Tribune from the Omaha World-Herald Company in 2010. In 2015, the Stephens Media newspapers were sold to New Media Investment Group. New Media acquired Gannett Company in 2019, making the Tribune a sibling publication to The Des Moines Register.
