= TV Tribuna =

TV Tribuna (ZYP 277)
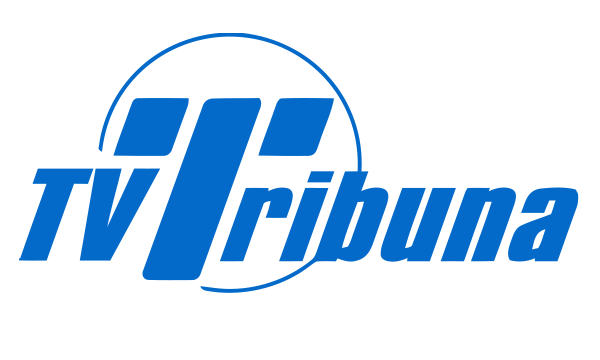
- Olinda-Recife, Pernambuco; Brazil
- City: Recife, Pernambuco
- Channels: Digital: 20 (UHF); Virtual: 4

Programming
- Affiliations: Rede Bandeirantes

Ownership
- Owner: Rede Tribuna; (Nassau Editora Rádio e TV Ltda.)
- Sister stations: Tribuna FM

History
- First air date: November 15, 1991
- Former call signs: ZYB 303 (1991-2017)
- Former channel numbers: Analog: 4 (VHF, 1991–2018)
- Former affiliations: Record (1998-2012)

Technical information
- Licensing authority: ANATEL
- ERP: 9 kW
- Transmitter coordinates: 7°59′35.5″S 34°52′14.5″W

Links
- Public license information: Profile
- Website: www.tribunaonline.com.br

TV Tribuna (channel 4) is a Brazilian television station headquartered in Olinda, but licensed to Recife, Pernambuco. serving as an affiliate of the Band television network. The station is part of Rede Tribuna, a subsidiary of Grupo Industrial João Santos, also responsible for radio station Tribuna FM.

== History ==
TV Tribuna went on air on November 15, 1991, as a Rede Bandeirantes affiliate. However, work of its state-of-the-art tower, 74 meters in height, started in the 80s and was designed by architect Fernando Guerra. At its top, a luxury restaurant existed in the 1990s, L’Étoile (French for "The Star"), with a panoramic view of the cities of Recife, Olinda and Paulista. On November 1, 1998, it became an affiliate of Rede Record, precisely on the third day of Recifolia. Due to tensions between station management and the network, the contract was discontinued and on January 9, 2012, TV Tribuna returned to Rede Bandeirantes.

In the 2010s, Grupo Industrial João Santos suffered an administrative crises derived from disputes over the control of the owner who died in 2009. That crisis had significant repercussions on TV Tribuna and Rede Tribuna's other assets, which are part of the holding. The station, in particular, was affected by millionaire debts, causing relays in the salaries of its staff. In April 2021, around 30 staff from TV Tribuna's news department denounced the company to the Ministry of Labor and Employment, alleging that they were receiving salaries irregularly since February. They also demanded help from Sindicato dos Jornalistas Profissionais de Pernambuco (Sinjope) and Rede Bandeirantes to solve the question, threatening to enter strike if they didn't receive. Professionals from competing stations, such as TV Globo Nordeste, also held campaigns to raise donations for their colleagues.

On May 5, TV Tribuna and other Grupo Industrial João Santos companies were targets of Operation Background, que investigava money laundering, currency evasion, tax evasion and labor rights crimes. As a result, the station had its accounts blocked by the Federal Justice for the payment of the creditors. On November 3, set to complete three months without receiving salaries, which in some cases were paid in exchanges, TV Tribuna's staff entered a strike, after a labor assembly held by Sinjope. The deepening of the crisis caused the station to cancel most of its local programs.

== Technical information ==
Virtual channel	Digital channel	Screen	Content
4.1	20 UHF	1080i	TV Tribuna/Band's main schedule
