= Tribune, Kansas =

City in Greeley County, Kansas

- Consolidated city-county
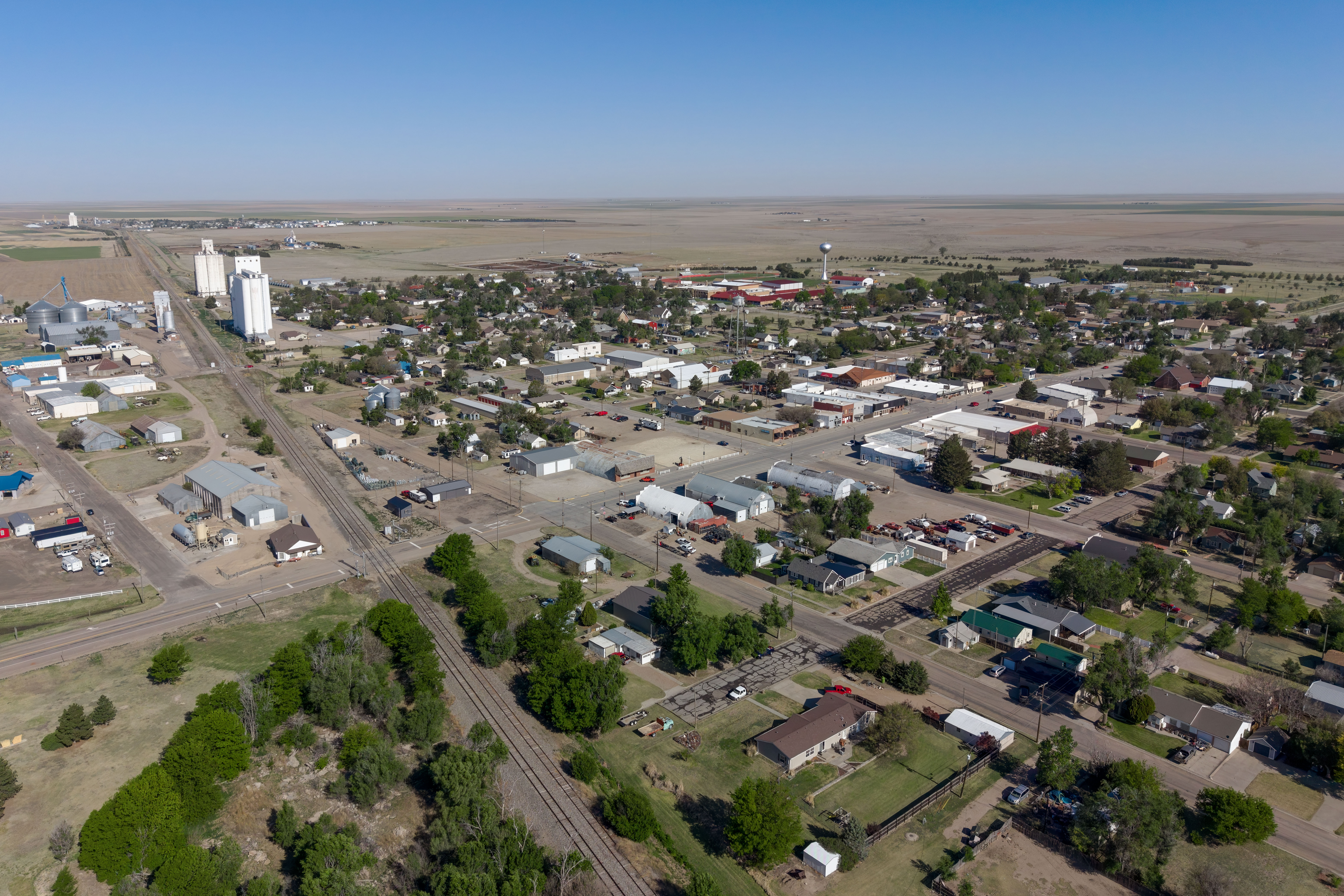
- Downtown (2026)

- Location within Greeley County and Kansas

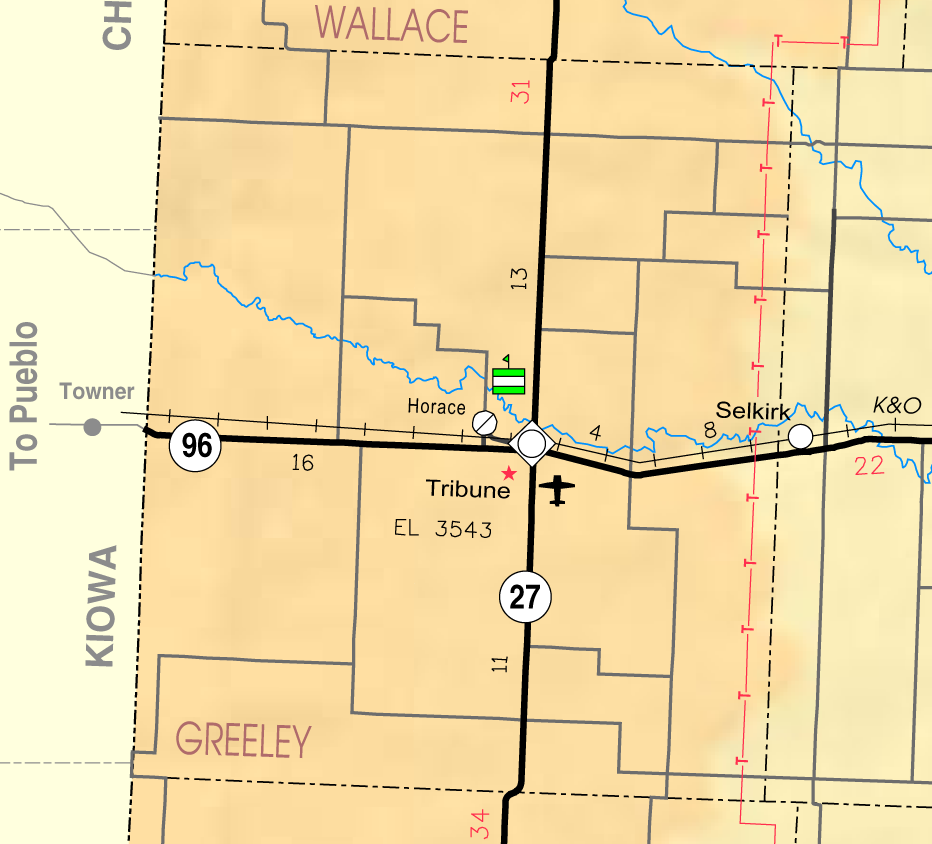
- KDOT map of Greeley County (legend)
- Coordinates: 38°28′19″N 101°45′16″W
- Country: United States
- State: Kansas
- County: Greeley
- Township: Tribune
- Founded: 1886
- Incorporated: 1888
- Named for: New-York Tribune

Area
  - Total: 0.74 sq mi (1.92 km^{2})
  - Land: 0.74 sq mi (1.92 km^{2})
  - Water: 0 sq mi (0.00 km^{2})
- Elevation: 3,616 ft (1,102 m)

Population (2020)
  - Total: 772
  - Density: 1,040/sq mi (402/km^{2})
- Time zone: UTC-7 (Mountain (MST))
  - Summer (DST): UTC-6 (MDT)
- ZIP Code: 67879
- Area code: 620
- FIPS code: 20-71450
- GNIS ID: 2397052
- Website: City Webpage

Tribune is a city in and the county seat of Greeley County, Kansas, United States. As of the 2020 census, the population of the city was 772.

== History ==
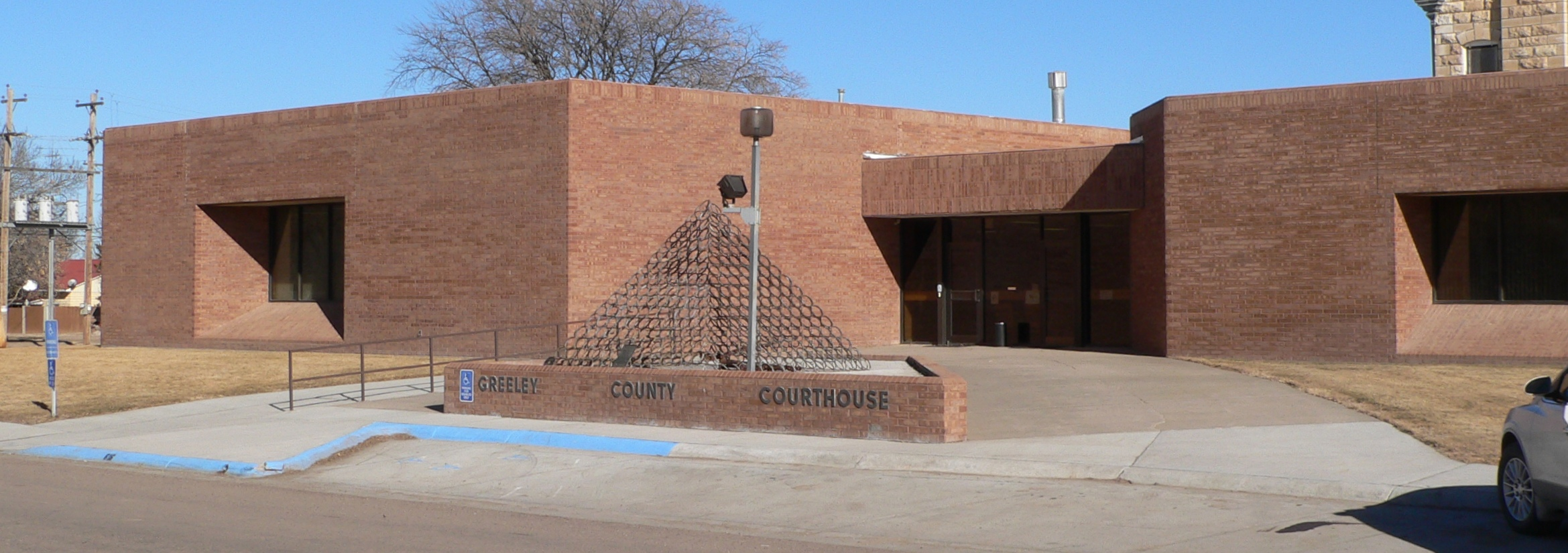
Greeley County courthouse (2010)

Tribune was founded in 1886. The railroad depot was built in 1887, at which time Tribune was designated as the county seat. The city is named after the New York Tribune, of which Horace Greeley of Chappaqua, New York was the editor. Greeley encouraged western settlement with the motto "Go West, young man".

Since January 1, 2009, the City of Tribune and Greeley County have operated as a unified government. The resulting government consists of a five-member commission with two members elected by city residents, two by rural residents, and one at-large. Similar to Wyandotte County, the only other consolidated city-county in the state, part of the county was not included: Horace decided against consolidation. Due to this, the city-county is the fifth largest city in the US by area and the largest in the contiguous United States.

== Geography ==
According to the United States Census Bureau, the city has a total area of 0.74 square miles (1.92 km^{2}), all land.

=== Climate ===
According to the Köppen Climate Classification system, Tribune has a semi-arid climate, abbreviated "BSk" on climate maps.

Climate data for Tribune, Kansas, 1991–2020 normals, extremes 1893–present
Month	Jan	Feb	Mar	Apr	May	Jun	Jul	Aug	Sep	Oct	Nov	Dec	Year
Record high °F (°C)	79 (26)	88 (31)	95 (35)	97 (36)	103 (39)	111 (44)	112 (44)	108 (42)	104 (40)	97 (36)	86 (30)	82 (28)	112 (44)
Mean maximum °F (°C)	67.9 (19.9)	72.6 (22.6)	81.8 (27.7)	87.6 (30.9)	94.5 (34.7)	101.3 (38.5)	103.7 (39.8)	101.0 (38.3)	98.4 (36.9)	91.1 (32.8)	78.0 (25.6)	67.3 (19.6)	104.6 (40.3)
Mean daily maximum °F (°C)	44.2 (6.8)	47.2 (8.4)	56.9 (13.8)	64.9 (18.3)	74.6 (23.7)	86.2 (30.1)	91.4 (33.0)	88.2 (31.2)	81.4 (27.4)	68.3 (20.2)	54.7 (12.6)	44.8 (7.1)	66.9 (19.4)
Daily mean °F (°C)	30.2 (−1.0)	33.0 (0.6)	41.7 (5.4)	49.8 (9.9)	60.3 (15.7)	71.4 (21.9)	76.5 (24.7)	74.0 (23.3)	66.1 (18.9)	52.5 (11.4)	40.2 (4.6)	31.0 (−0.6)	52.2 (11.2)
Mean daily minimum °F (°C)	16.1 (−8.8)	18.7 (−7.4)	26.5 (−3.1)	34.6 (1.4)	46.0 (7.8)	56.6 (13.7)	61.7 (16.5)	59.8 (15.4)	50.8 (10.4)	36.7 (2.6)	25.6 (−3.6)	17.2 (−8.2)	37.5 (3.1)
Mean minimum °F (°C)	−2.5 (−19.2)	0.7 (−17.4)	8.6 (−13.0)	19.0 (−7.2)	30.8 (−0.7)	43.7 (6.5)	52.0 (11.1)	50.2 (10.1)	36.3 (2.4)	19.3 (−7.1)	7.7 (−13.5)	−2.7 (−19.3)	−8.3 (−22.4)
Record low °F (°C)	−25 (−32)	−25 (−32)	0 (−18)	4 (−16)	19 (−7)	30 (−1)	41 (5)	40 (4)	20 (−7)	2 (−17)	−10 (−23)	−24 (−31)	−25 (−32)
Average precipitation inches (mm)	0.43 (11)	0.54 (14)	0.99 (25)	1.66 (42)	2.23 (57)	2.77 (70)	3.14 (80)	2.87 (73)	1.13 (29)	1.59 (40)	0.53 (13)	0.56 (14)	18.44 (468)
Average snowfall inches (cm)	4.2 (11)	4.2 (11)	3.6 (9.1)	2.1 (5.3)	0.3 (0.76)	0.0 (0.0)	0.0 (0.0)	0.0 (0.0)	0.1 (0.25)	1.3 (3.3)	2.1 (5.3)	3.8 (9.7)	21.7 (55.71)
Average precipitation days (≥ 0.01 in)	3.1	3.4	4.5	6.2	7.6	7.7	8.2	8.0	5.0	4.9	3.2	3.2	65.0
Average snowy days (≥ 0.1 in)	2.5	2.5	1.9	0.7	0.1	0.0	0.0	0.0	0.0	0.4	1.0	2.4	11.5
Source 1: NOAA
Source 2: National Weather Service

== Demographics ==
Historical population
Census	Pop.	Note	%±
1890	90		—
1900	62		−31.1%
1910	158		154.8%
1920	243		53.8%
1930	436		79.4%
1940	607		39.2%
1950	1,010		66.4%
1960	1,036		2.6%
1970	1,013		−2.2%
1980	955		−5.7%
1990	918		−3.9%
2000	835		−9.0%
2010	741		−11.3%
2020	772		4.2%
U.S. Decennial Census

=== 2010 census ===
As of the census of 2010, there were 741 people, 327 households, and 204 families residing in the city. The population density was 1,001.4 inhabitants per square mile (386.6/km^{2}). There were 385 housing units at an average density of 520.3 per square mile (200.9/km^{2}). The racial makeup of the city was 92.2% White, 0.1% African American, 0.8% Native American, 0.3% Asian, 5.5% from other races, and 1.1% from two or more races. Hispanic or Latino of any race were 13.0% of the population.

There were 327 households, of which 22.9% had children under the age of 18 living with them, 56.6% were married couples living together, 4.0% had a female householder with no husband present, 1.8% had a male householder with no wife present, and 37.6% were non-families. 35.5% of all households were made up of individuals, and 17.5% had someone living alone who was 65 years of age or older. The average household size was 2.19 and the average family size was 2.84.

The median age in the city was 49.1 years. 19.3% of residents were under the age of 18; 6.1% were between the ages of 18 and 24; 17.3% were from 25 to 44; 31% were from 45 to 64; and 26.2% were 65 years of age or older. The gender makeup of the city was 47.0% male and 53.0% female.

=== 2000 census ===
As of the census of 2000, there were 835 people, 356 households, and 232 families residing in the city. The population density was 1,117.0 inhabitants per square mile (431.3/km^{2}). There were 425 housing units at an average density of 568.5 per square mile (219.5/km^{2}). The racial makeup of the city was 94.37% White, 0.12% African American, 0.36% Native American, 0.12% Asian, 0.24% Pacific Islander, 3.59% from other races, and 1.20% from two or more races. Hispanic or Latino of any race were 6.35% of the population.

There were 356 households, out of which 28.9% had children under the age of 18 living with them, 57.9% were married couples living together, 5.1% had a female householder with no husband present, and 34.8% were non-families. 31.7% of all households were made up of individuals, and 16.6% had someone living alone who was 65 years of age or older. The average household size was 2.27 and the average family size was 2.87.

In the city, the population was spread out, with 23.6% under the age of 18, 6.1% from 18 to 24, 24.1% from 25 to 44, 22.2% from 45 to 64, and 24.1% who were 65 years of age or older. The median age was 43 years. For every 100 females, there were 89.8 males. For every 100 females age 18 and over, there were 82.3 males.

The median income for a household in the city was $32,969, and the median income for a family was $46,563. Males had a median income of $30,132 versus $16,458 for females. The per capita income for the city was $20,020. About 7.0% of families and 9.6% of the population were below the poverty line, including 8.3% of those under age 18 and 9.4% of those age 65 or over.

== Education ==
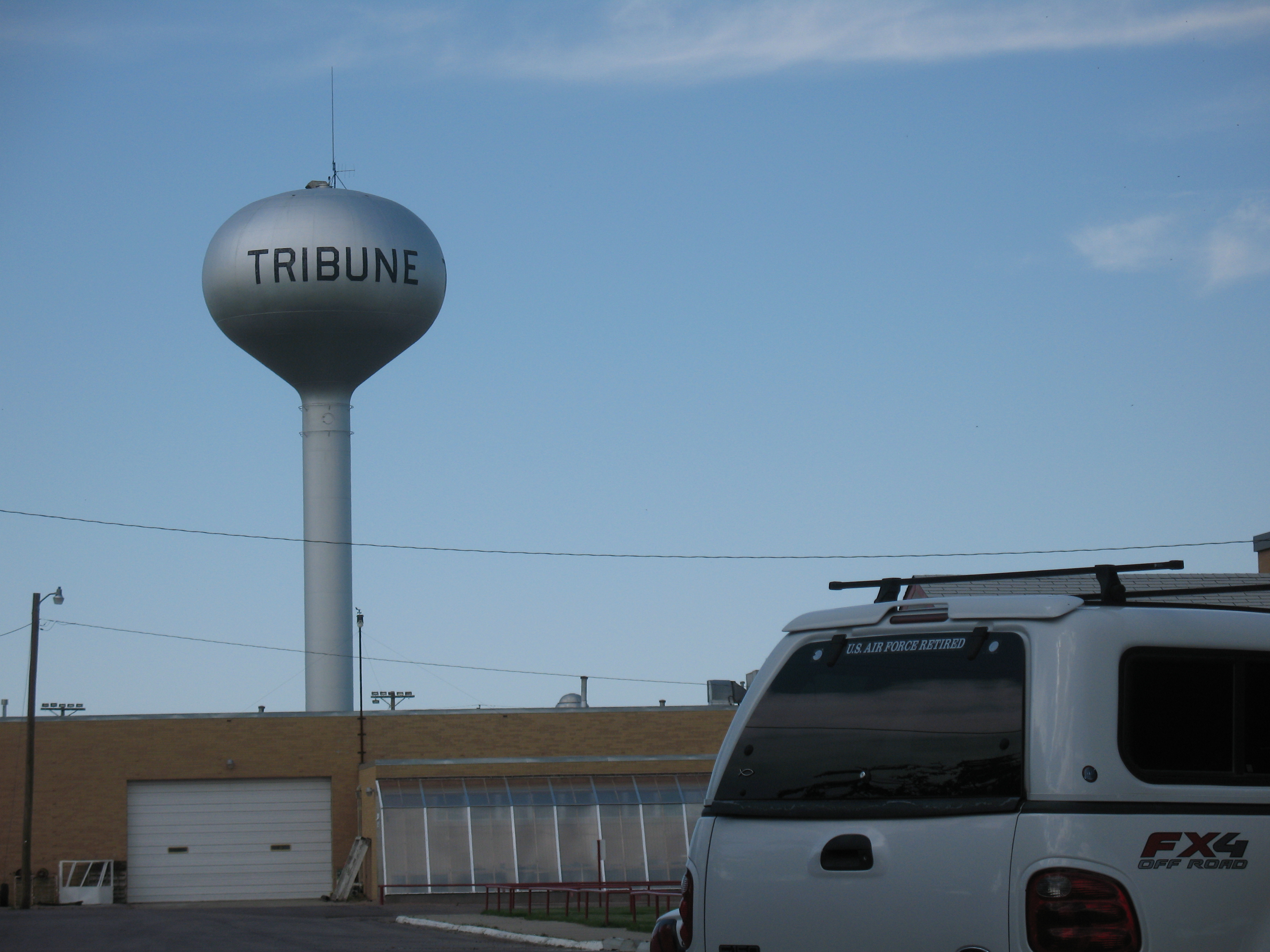
City water tower (2009)

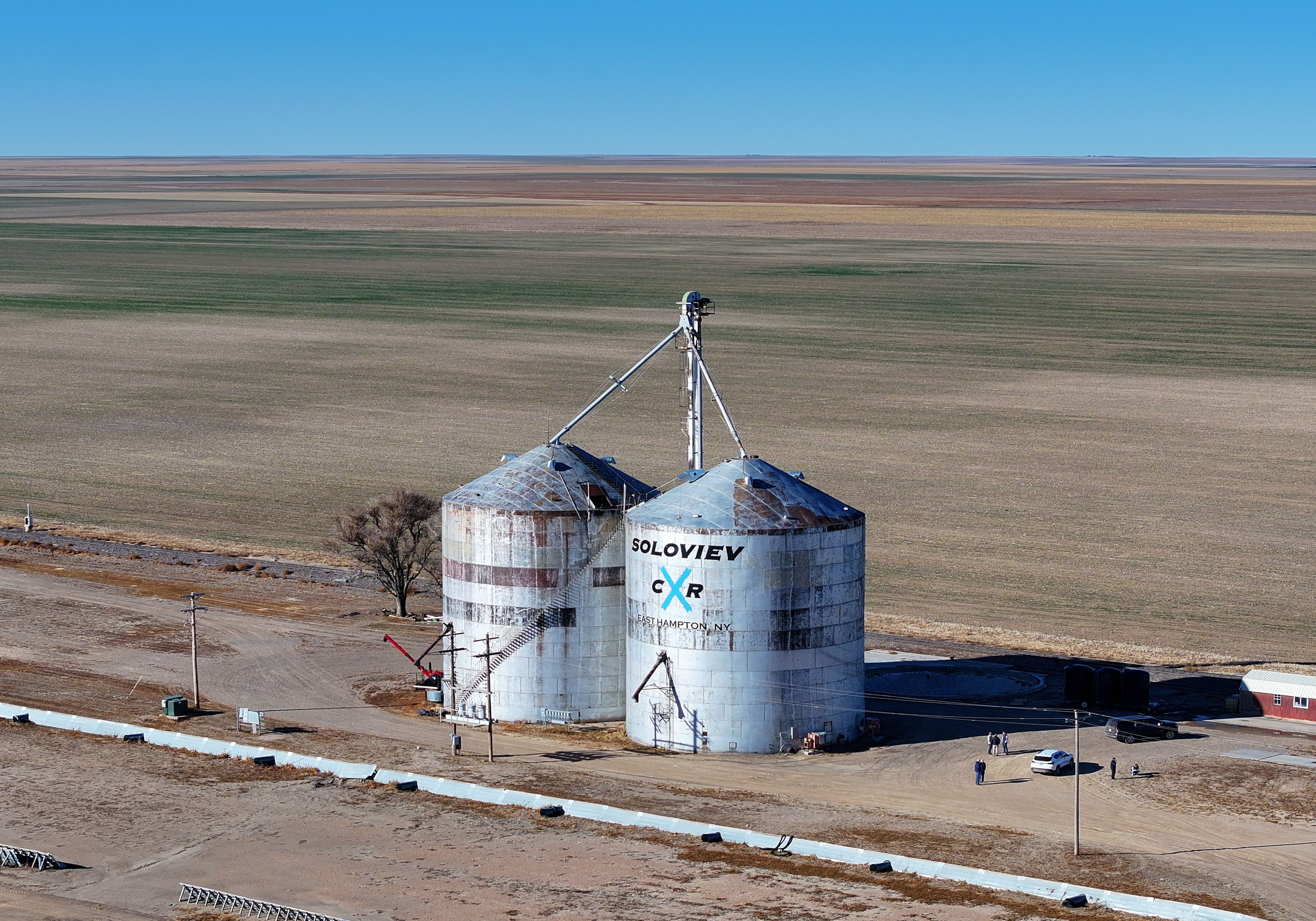
Grain bins west of Tribune (2023)

The community is served by Greeley County USD 200 public school district. All grades (Pre K-12) are all on the same campus in connected buildings. The high school has the largest building (2 stories) and houses the district's auditorium and library. In 2011 the Greeley County community voted and approved a multimillion-dollar project to completely renovate the elementary wing. Greeley County, as of 2017 under KSHSAA Classifications, was a 1A School.

Schools

- Greeley County High School (9-12)
- Greeley County Junior High (6-8)
- Greeley County Elementary (PreK-5)

The Greeley County Jackrabbits have won the following Kansas State High School championships:

- 1968 Boys Basketball - Class B
- 1998 Football - Class 8-Man DI
- 2011 Boys Basketball - Class 1A DII
- 2022 Boys Basketball - Class 1A DII
- 2023 Boys Basketball - Class 1A DII

== In popular culture ==
Tribune appears in several episodes of the television series Prison Break.

== See also ==
- Greeley County Courthouse
- Horace Greeley Museum
