= List of counties in Kansas =

Counties of Kansas
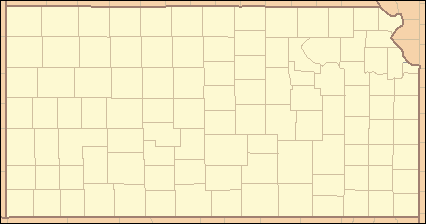
- Location: State of Kansas
- Number: 105
- Populations: 1,182 (Greeley) – 636,906 (Johnson)
- Areas: 151 square miles (390 km^{2}) (Wyandotte) – 1,428 square miles (3,700 km^{2}) (Butler)
- Government: County government
- Subdivisions: Cities, towns, townships, unincorporated communities, Indian reservations, census-designated places

Kansas has 105 counties, the fifth-highest total of any state. The first counties were established while Kansas was a Territory from May 30, 1854, until January 29, 1861, when Kansas became a state. Many of the counties in the eastern part of the state are named after prominent Americans from the late 18th and early-to-mid-19th centuries, while those in the central and western part of the state are named for figures in the American Civil War. Several counties throughout the state bear names of Native American origin.

Wyandotte County and the city of Kansas City, and Greeley County and the city of Tribune, operate as unified governments.

Every license plate issued by the state contains the same two-letter abbreviation for the county in which its vehicle is registered. The FIPS state code for Kansas is 20.

== Counties ==
County	FIPS code	County seat	Est.	Origin	Etymology	County code	Population (2025 estimate)	Area	Map
Allen County	001	Iola	August 25, 1855	One of the original 36 counties	William Allen, U.S. Senator from Ohio and prominent supporter of westward expansion	AL	12,302	503 sq mi (1,303 km^{2})	State map highlighting Allen County
Anderson County	003	Garnett	August 25, 1855	One of the original 36 counties	Joseph C. Anderson, Kansas territorial legislator and Border Ruffian during "Bleeding Kansas"	AN	8,018	583 sq mi (1,510 km^{2})	State map highlighting Anderson County
Atchison County	005	Atchison	August 25, 1855	One of the original 36 counties	David Rice Atchison, U.S. Senator from Missouri and Border Ruffian during "Bleeding Kansas"	AT	16,172	432 sq mi (1,119 km^{2})	State map highlighting Atchison County
Barber County	007	Medicine Lodge	February 26, 1867	From unorganized area	Thomas W. Barber, prominent Free-Stater killed in the Wakarusa War	BA	4,083	1,134 sq mi (2,937 km^{2})	State map highlighting Barber County
Barton County	009	Great Bend	February 26, 1867	From unorganized area	Clara Barton, founder of the American Red Cross	BT	24,790	894 sq mi (2,315 km^{2})	State map highlighting Barton County
Bourbon County	011	Fort Scott	August 25, 1855	One of the original 36 counties	Bourbon County, Kentucky, from which many original settlers hailed	BB	14,319	637 sq mi (1,650 km^{2})	State map highlighting Bourbon County
Brown County	013	Hiawatha	August 25, 1855	One of the original 36 counties (Formerly Browne County)	Albert Gallatin Brown, U.S. Senator from Mississippi and Kansas statehood advocate	BR	9,104	571 sq mi (1,479 km^{2})	State map highlighting Brown County
Butler County	015	El Dorado	August 25, 1855	One of the original 36 counties	Andrew Pickens Butler, U.S. Senator from South Carolina and Kansas statehood advocate	BU	69,484	1,428 sq mi (3,699 km^{2})	State map highlighting Butler County
Chase County	017	Cottonwood Falls	February 11, 1859	Formed from Butler and Wise counties	Salmon Portland Chase, U.S. Senator from Ohio and Kansas statehood advocate	CS	2,572	776 sq mi (2,010 km^{2})	State map highlighting Chase County
Chautauqua County	019	Sedan	June 1, 1875	Formed from Howard County	Chautauqua County, New York, from which many early settlers hailed	CQ	3,321	642 sq mi (1,663 km^{2})	State map highlighting Chautauqua County
Cherokee County	021	Columbus	August 25, 1855	One of the original 36 counties (Formerly McGee County)	Cherokee Native Americans, whose lands borders the county in nearby Indian Territory	CK	19,105	587 sq mi (1,520 km^{2})	State map highlighting Cherokee County
Cheyenne County	023	Saint Francis	March 20, 1873	From unorganized area	Cheyenne Native Americans, who inhabited the area	CN	2,604	1,020 sq mi (2,642 km^{2})	State map highlighting Cheyenne County
Clark County	025	Ashland	February 26, 1867	Formed from Ford County	Charles F. Clarke, Captain in 6th Regiment Kansas Volunteer Cavalry during American Civil War	CA	1,900	975 sq mi (2,525 km^{2})	State map highlighting Clark County
Clay County	027	Clay Center	February 20, 1857	From unorganized area	Henry Clay, influential U.S. Senator from Kentucky	CY	7,990	644 sq mi (1,668 km^{2})	State map highlighting Clay County
Cloud County	029	Concordia	February 27, 1860	Formed from Washington (Formerly Shirley County)	William F. Cloud, Union general in the American Civil War who chiefly fought in Kansas and Missouri	CD	8,833	716 sq mi (1,854 km^{2})	State map highlighting Cloud County
Coffey County	031	Burlington	August 25, 1855	One of the original 36 counties	A.M. Coffey, territorial legislator and Free-Stater during Bleeding Kansas	CF	8,467	630 sq mi (1,632 km^{2})	State map highlighting Coffey County
Comanche County	033	Coldwater	February 26, 1867	From unorganized area	Comanche Native Americans, who lived in the area	CM	1,673	788 sq mi (2,041 km^{2})	State map highlighting Comanche County
Cowley County	035	Winfield	February 26, 1867	Formed from Butler County	Matthew R. Cowley, Union lieutenant and distinguished Civil War hero	CL	34,382	1,126 sq mi (2,916 km^{2})	State map highlighting Cowley County
Crawford County	037	Girard	February 13, 1867	Bourbon and Cherokee Counties	Samuel J. Crawford, third Governor of Kansas	CR	39,008	593 sq mi (1,536 km^{2})	State map highlighting Crawford County
Decatur County	039	Oberlin	March 20, 1873	From unorganized area	Stephen Decatur, naval commodore and War of 1812 hero	DC	2,716	894 sq mi (2,315 km^{2})	State map highlighting Decatur County
Dickinson County	041	Abilene	February 20, 1857	From unorganized area	Daniel Stevens Dickinson, U.S. Senator from New York and Kansas statehood advocate	DK	18,637	848 sq mi (2,196 km^{2})	State map highlighting Dickinson County
Doniphan County	043	Troy	August 25, 1855	One of the original 36 counties	Alexander William Doniphan, Mexican–American War hero and pro-slavery sympathizer in "Bleeding Kansas"	DP	7,594	392 sq mi (1,015 km^{2})	State map highlighting Doniphan County
Douglas County	045	Lawrence	August 25, 1855	One of the original 36 counties	Stephen Arnold Douglas, U.S. Senator from Illinois and advocate for the moderate popular sovereignty choice in the Kansas slavery debate	DG	120,920	457 sq mi (1,184 km^{2})	State map highlighting Douglas County
Edwards County	047	Kinsley	March 18, 1874	Formed from Kiowa County	John H. Edwards, state senator who pushed for creation of the county	ED	2,640	622 sq mi (1,611 km^{2})	State map highlighting Edwards County
Elk County	049	Howard	June 1, 1875	Formed from Howard County	Elk River, which originates in the county	EK	2,458	648 sq mi (1,678 km^{2})	State map highlighting Elk County
Ellis County	051	Hays	February 26, 1867	From unorganized area	George Ellis, Union lieutenant and distinguished Civil War hero	EL	29,075	900 sq mi (2,331 km^{2})	State map highlighting Ellis County
Ellsworth County	053	Ellsworth	February 26, 1867	From unorganized area	Fort Ellsworth, a Union Civil War outpost in the area	EW	6,257	716 sq mi (1,854 km^{2})	State map highlighting Ellsworth County
Finney County	055	Garden City	February 22, 1883	Formed from Arapahoe, Grant, Kearney and Sequoyah Counties	David W. Finney, tenth lieutenant governor of Kansas	FI	37,505	1,300 sq mi (3,367 km^{2})	State map highlighting Finney County
Ford County	057	Dodge City	February 26, 1867	From unorganized area	James H. Ford, Union general in the Civil War who mainly fought in Kansas and Missouri	FO	33,993	1,099 sq mi (2,846 km^{2})	State map highlighting Ford County
Franklin County	059	Ottawa	August 25, 1855	One of the original 36 counties	Benjamin Franklin, orator, writer, scholar, and founding father of the U.S.	FR	26,299	574 sq mi (1,487 km^{2})	State map highlighting Franklin County
Geary County	061	Junction City	August 25, 1855	One of the original 36 counties (Formerly Davis County)	John White Geary, Union general in the Civil War, who had previously been Kansas territorial governor	GE	36,338	384 sq mi (995 km^{2})	State map highlighting Geary County
Gove County	063	Gove City	March 11, 1868	From unorganized area	Grenville L. Gove, Captain in the 11th Regiment Kansas Volunteer Cavalry during the Civil War	GO	2,631	1,072 sq mi (2,776 km^{2})	State map highlighting Gove County
Graham County	065	Hill City	February 26, 1867	From unorganized area	John L. Graham, Union captain and Civil War hero	GH	2,371	898 sq mi (2,326 km^{2})	State map highlighting Graham County
Grant County	067	Ulysses	March 20, 1873	Formed from Finney and Hamilton Counties	Ulysses Simpson Grant, commander of Union forces during the Civil War and U.S. President	GT	7,028	575 sq mi (1,489 km^{2})	State map highlighting Grant County
Gray County	069	Cimarron	March 13, 1881	Formed from Finney and Ford Counties	Alfred Gray, Kansas Secretary of Agriculture	GY	5,652	869 sq mi (2,251 km^{2})	State map highlighting Gray County
Greeley County	071	Tribune	March 20, 1873	From unorganized area	Horace Greeley, publisher of the New York Tribune and anti-slavery advocate	GL	1,182	778 sq mi (2,015 km^{2})	State map highlighting Greeley County
Greenwood County	073	Eureka	August 25, 1855	One of the original 36 counties	Alfred B. Greenwood, U.S. Representative from Arkansas and Kansas statehood advocate	GW	5,826	1,140 sq mi (2,953 km^{2})	State map highlighting Greenwood County
Hamilton County	075	Syracuse	March 20, 1873	From unorganized area	Alexander Hamilton, first U.S. Treasury Secretary and founding father	HM	2,500	996 sq mi (2,580 km^{2})	State map highlighting Hamilton County
Harper County	077	Anthony	February 26, 1867	From unorganized area	Marion Harper, Union sergeant and Civil War hero	HP	5,370	802 sq mi (2,077 km^{2})	State map highlighting Harper County
Harvey County	079	Newton	March 7, 1872	Formed from McPherson, Sedgwick and Reno Counties	James M. Harvey, fifth governor of Kansas	HV	33,580	539 sq mi (1,396 km^{2})	State map highlighting Harvey County
Haskell County	081	Sublette	March 23, 1887	Formed from Finney and Ford Counties	Dudley Chase Haskell, U.S. Representative from Kansas	HS	3,599	577 sq mi (1,494 km^{2})	State map highlighting Haskell County
Hodgeman County	083	Jetmore	February 26, 1867	From unorganized area (Formerly Hageman County)	Amos Hodgman, Union captain and Civil War hero	HG	1,619	860 sq mi (2,227 km^{2})	State map highlighting Hodgeman County
Jackson County	085	Holton	August 25, 1855	One of the original 36 counties (Formerly Calhoun County)	Andrew Jackson, seventh U.S. President	JA	13,438	657 sq mi (1,702 km^{2})	State map highlighting Jackson County
Jefferson County	087	Oskaloosa	August 25, 1855	One of the original 36 counties	Thomas Jefferson, third U.S. President and founding father	JF	18,296	536 sq mi (1,388 km^{2})	State map highlighting Jefferson County
Jewell County	089	Mankato	February 26, 1867	From unorganized area	Lewis R. Jewell, Union colonel and Civil War hero	JW	2,830	909 sq mi (2,354 km^{2})	State map highlighting Jewell County
Johnson County	091	Olathe	August 25, 1855	One of the original 36 counties	Thomas Johnson, Methodist missionary who was one of the state's first settlers	JO	636,906	477 sq mi (1,235 km^{2})	State map highlighting Johnson County
Kearny County	093	Lakin	March 20, 1873	Formed from Finney and Hamilton Counties	Philip Kearny, American general in the Mexican–American and Civil Wars	KE	3,888	870 sq mi (2,253 km^{2})	State map highlighting Kearny County
Kingman County	095	Kingman	March 7, 1872	Harper and Reno Counties	Samuel A. Kingman, Chief Justice of the Kansas Supreme Court	KM	7,029	864 sq mi (2,238 km^{2})	State map highlighting Kingman County
Kiowa County	097	Greensburg	February 26, 1867	Formed from Comanche and Edwards Counties	Kiowa Native Americans, who inhabited the area	KW	2,432	722 sq mi (1,870 km^{2})	State map highlighting Kiowa County
Labette County	099	Oswego	February 7, 1867	Formed from Neosho County	Pierre La Bette, French fur trapper who formed a peaceful relationship with area natives	LB	19,685	649 sq mi (1,681 km^{2})	State map highlighting Labette County
Lane County	101	Dighton	March 20, 1873	From unorganized area	James H. Lane, U.S. Senator from Kansas and Free-Stater during "Bleeding Kansas"	LE	1,508	717 sq mi (1,857 km^{2})	State map highlighting Lane County
Leavenworth County	103	Leavenworth	August 25, 1855	One of the original 36 counties	Henry Leavenworth, general in the Indian Wars who established a fort in the area	LV	84,590	463 sq mi (1,199 km^{2})	State map highlighting Leavenworth County
Lincoln County	105	Lincoln Center	February 26, 1867	From unorganized area	Abraham Lincoln, sixteenth U.S. President	LC	2,861	719 sq mi (1,862 km^{2})	State map highlighting Lincoln County
Linn County	107	Mound City	August 25, 1855	One of the original 36 counties	Lewis Fields Linn, U.S. Senator from Kentucky whose family was later involved in the settlement of Kansas	LN	9,950	599 sq mi (1,551 km^{2})	State map highlighting Linn County
Logan County	109	Oakley	March 13, 1881	Formed from Wallace County (formerly named St. John County)	John Alexander Logan, prominent Union Civil War general and U.S. Senator from Illinois	LG	2,661	1,073 sq mi (2,779 km^{2})	State map highlighting Logan County
Lyon County	111	Emporia	August 25, 1855	One of the original 36 counties (Formerly Breckenridge County)	Nathaniel Lyon, first Union general to be killed in the Civil War	LY	32,266	851 sq mi (2,204 km^{2})	State map highlighting Lyon County
Marion County	115	Marion	August 25, 1855	From unorganized area	Francis Marion, American Revolutionary War hero	MN	11,634	943 sq mi (2,442 km^{2})	State map highlighting Marion County
Marshall County	117	Marysville	August 25, 1855	One of the original 36 counties	Frank J. Marshall, state representative who became locally known for operating the first ferry over the Big Blue River	MS	9,852	903 sq mi (2,339 km^{2})	State map highlighting Marshall County
McPherson County	113	McPherson	February 26, 1867	From unorganized area	James Birdseye McPherson, prominent Union Civil War general	MP	30,064	900 sq mi (2,331 km^{2})	State map highlighting McPherson County
Meade County	119	Meade	March 20, 1873	Formed from Finney, Ford and Seward Counties	George Gordon Meade, Union Civil War general best known for his victory at the Battle of Gettysburg	ME	3,852	978 sq mi (2,533 km^{2})	State map highlighting Meade County
Miami County	121	Paola	August 25, 1855	One of the original 36 counties (Formerly Lykins)	Miami Native Americans, who lived in the area	MI	36,240	577 sq mi (1,494 km^{2})	State map highlighting Miami County
Mitchell County	123	Beloit	February 26, 1867	From unorganized area	William D. Mitchell, Union captain and Civil War hero	MC	5,590	700 sq mi (1,813 km^{2})	State map highlighting Mitchell County
Montgomery County	125	Independence	February 26, 1867	Formed from Wilson County	Richard Montgomery, Revolutionary War hero	MG	30,177	645 sq mi (1,671 km^{2})	State map highlighting Montgomery County
Morris County	127	Council Grove	August 25, 1855	One of the original 36 counties (Formerly Wise County)	Thomas Morris, U.S. Senator from Ohio and anti-slavery advocate	MR	5,348	697 sq mi (1,805 km^{2})	State map highlighting Morris County
Morton County	129	Elkhart	February 20, 1886	Formed from Seward County	Oliver P. Morton, Governor of Indiana and prominent anti-slavery advocate	MT	2,470	730 sq mi (1,891 km^{2})	State map highlighting Morton County
Nemaha County	131	Seneca	August 25, 1855	One of the original 36 counties	Nemaha River, which passes through the county	NM	10,054	719 sq mi (1,862 km^{2})	State map highlighting Nemaha County
Neosho County	133	Erie	August 25, 1855	One of the original 36 counties (Formerly Dorn County)	Neosho River, which passes through the county	NO	15,637	572 sq mi (1,481 km^{2})	State map highlighting Neosho County
Ness County	135	Ness City	February 26, 1867	From unorganized area	Noah V. Ness, Corporal in 7th Regiment Kansas Volunteer Cavalry during Civil War	NS	2,617	1,075 sq mi (2,784 km^{2})	State map highlighting Ness County
Norton County	137	Norton	February 26, 1867	From unorganized area (Formerly Billings (1873–79)	Orloff Norton, Union captain and Civil War hero	NT	5,288	878 sq mi (2,274 km^{2})	State map highlighting Norton County
Osage County	139	Lyndon	August 25, 1855	One of the original 36 counties (Formerly Weller County)	Osage River, which flows through the county	OS	15,693	704 sq mi (1,823 km^{2})	State map highlighting Osage County
Osborne County	141	Osborne	February 26, 1867	From unorganized area	Vincent B. Osborne, Union soldier and Civil War hero	OB	3,285	893 sq mi (2,313 km^{2})	State map highlighting Osborne County
Ottawa County	143	Minneapolis	February 27, 1860	From unorganized area	Ottawa Native Americans, who lived in the area	OT	5,744	721 sq mi (1,867 km^{2})	State map highlighting Ottawa County
Pawnee County	145	Larned	February 26, 1867	From unorganized area	Pawnee Native Americans, who lived in the area	PN	5,991	754 sq mi (1,953 km^{2})	State map highlighting Pawnee County
Phillips County	147	Phillipsburg	February 26, 1867	From unorganized area	William Phillips, state legislator who pushed for creation of the county, and later U.S. Representative	PL	4,728	886 sq mi (2,295 km^{2})	State map highlighting Phillips County
Pottawatomie County	149	Westmoreland	February 20, 1857	Formed from Calhoun and Riley	Pottawatomie Native Americans, who lived in the area	PT	27,186	844 sq mi (2,186 km^{2})	State map highlighting Pottawatomie County
Pratt County	151	Pratt	February 26, 1867	From unorganized area	Caleb Pratt, Union lieutenant and Civil War hero	PR	9,117	735 sq mi (1,904 km^{2})	State map highlighting Pratt County
Rawlins County	153	Atwood	March 20, 1873	From unorganized area	John Aaron Rawlins, prominent Union Civil War general	RA	2,431	1,070 sq mi (2,771 km^{2})	State map highlighting Rawlins County
Reno County	155	Hutchinson	February 26, 1867	From unorganized area	Jesse L. Reno, prominent Union Civil War general	RN	61,539	1,254 sq mi (3,248 km^{2})	State map highlighting Reno County
Republic County	157	Belleville	February 27, 1860	Formed from Washington County	Republican River, which flows through the county	RP	4,640	716 sq mi (1,854 km^{2})	State map highlighting Republic County
Rice County	159	Lyons	February 26, 1867	From unorganized area	Samuel A. Rice, prominent Union Civil War general	RC	9,266	727 sq mi (1,883 km^{2})	State map highlighting Rice County
Riley County	161	Manhattan	August 25, 1855	One of the original 36 counties	Bennett C. Riley, Mexican–American War hero	RL	72,598	610 sq mi (1,580 km^{2})	State map highlighting Riley County
Rooks County	163	Stockton	February 26, 1867	From unorganized area	John C. Rooks, Private in 11th Regiment Kansas Volunteer Cavalry during Civil War	RO	4,646	888 sq mi (2,300 km^{2})	State map highlighting Rooks County
Rush County	165	La Crosse	February 26, 1867	From unorganized area	Alexander Rush, Union captain and Civil War hero	RH	2,845	718 sq mi (1,860 km^{2})	State map highlighting Rush County
Russell County	167	Russell	February 26, 1867	From unorganized area	Avra P. Russell, Union captain and Civil War hero	RS	6,581	885 sq mi (2,292 km^{2})	State map highlighting Russell County
Saline County	169	Salina	February 15, 1860	From unorganized area	Saline River, which flows through the county	SA	53,377	720 sq mi (1,865 km^{2})	State map highlighting Saline County
Scott County	171	Scott City	March 20, 1873	From unorganized area	Winfield Scott, Mexican–American War hero and unsuccessful presidential candidate	SC	4,815	718 sq mi (1,860 km^{2})	State map highlighting Scott County
Sedgwick County	173	Wichita	February 26, 1867	Formed from Butler County	John Sedgwick, highest ranking Union general killed in the Civil War	SG	538,433	1,000 sq mi (2,590 km^{2})	State map highlighting Sedgwick County
Seward County	175	Liberal	March 20, 1873	From unorganized area	William Henry Seward, U.S. Secretary of State	SW	21,073	640 sq mi (1,658 km^{2})	State map highlighting Seward County
Shawnee County	177	Topeka	August 25, 1855	One of the original 36 counties	Shawnee Native Americans, who lived in the area	SN	178,607	550 sq mi (1,424 km^{2})	State map highlighting Shawnee County
Sheridan County	179	Hoxie	March 20, 1873	From unorganized area	Philip Henry Sheridan, prominent Union Civil War general	SD	2,427	896 sq mi (2,321 km^{2})	State map highlighting Sheridan County
Sherman County	181	Goodland	March 20, 1873	From unorganized area	William Tecumseh Sherman, prominent Civil War general	SH	5,763	1,056 sq mi (2,735 km^{2})	State map highlighting Sherman County
Smith County	183	Smith Center	February 26, 1867	From unorganized area	J. Nelson Smith, Union major and Civil War hero	SM	3,566	896 sq mi (2,321 km^{2})	State map highlighting Smith County
Stafford County	185	Saint John	February 26, 1867	From unorganized area	Lewis Stafford, Union captain and Civil War hero	SF	4,005	792 sq mi (2,051 km^{2})	State map highlighting Stafford County
Stanton County	187	Johnson City	March 20, 1873	Formed from Hamilton County	Edwin McMasters Stanton, U.S. Secretary of War during the Civil War	ST	1,986	680 sq mi (1,761 km^{2})	State map highlighting Stanton County
Stevens County	189	Hugoton	March 20, 1873	Formed from Seward County	Thaddeus Stevens, U.S. Representative from Pennsylvania who was a leader of Reconstruction politics	SV	4,984	728 sq mi (1,886 km^{2})	State map highlighting Stevens County
Sumner County	191	Wellington	February 26, 1867	Formed from Butler County	Charles Sumner, U.S. Senator from Massachusetts who was a leader of Reconstruction politics	SU	22,312	1,182 sq mi (3,061 km^{2})	State map highlighting Sumner County
Thomas County	193	Colby	March 20, 1873	From unorganized area	George Henry Thomas, prominent Union Civil War general	TH	7,725	1,075 sq mi (2,784 km^{2})	State map highlighting Thomas County
Trego County	195	WaKeeney	February 26, 1867	From unorganized area	Edgar P. Trego, Union captain and Civil War hero	TR	2,740	888 sq mi (2,300 km^{2})	State map highlighting Trego County
Wabaunsee County	197	Alma	August 25, 1855	One of the original 36 counties (Formerly Richardson County)	Chief Wabaunsee, Potawatomi leader	WB	7,018	798 sq mi (2,067 km^{2})	State map highlighting Wabaunsee County
Wallace County	199	Sharon Springs	March 11, 1868	From unorganized area	W.H.L. Wallace, prominent Union Civil War general	WA	1,441	914 sq mi (2,367 km^{2})	State map highlighting Wallace County
Washington County	201	Washington	August 25, 1855	From unorganized area	George Washington, first U.S. President and founding father	WS	5,533	898 sq mi (2,326 km^{2})	State map highlighting Washington County
Wichita County	203	Leoti	March 20, 1873	From unorganized area	Wichita Native Americans, who lived in the area	WH	2,031	719 sq mi (1,862 km^{2})	State map highlighting Wichita County
Wilson County	205	Fredonia	August 25, 1855	One of the original 36 counties	Hiero T. Wilson, Union colonel and Civil War hero	WL	8,299	574 sq mi (1,487 km^{2})	State map highlighting Wilson County
Woodson County	207	Yates Center	August 25, 1855	One of the original 36 counties	Daniel Woodson, five time acting governor of Kansas Territory	WO	3,118	501 sq mi (1,298 km^{2})	State map highlighting Woodson County
Wyandotte County	209	Kansas City	January 29, 1859	Formed from Leavenworth and Johnson Counties	Wyandotte Native Americans, who lived in the area	WY	170,597	151 sq mi (391 km^{2})	State map highlighting Wyandotte County

== Racial / Ethnic Profile of counties in Kansas (2020 Census) ==
Racial / Ethnic Profile of counties in Kansas (2020 Census)
Following is a table of counties in Kansas by race/ethnicity. The majority racial/ethnic group is coded per the key below.

Majority minority with no dominant group
Majority White
Majority Black
Majority Hispanic
Majority Asian
Majority Native American

Racial and ethnic composition of counties in Kansas (2020 Census) (NH = Non-Hispanic) Note: the US Census treats Hispanic/Latino as an ethnic category. This table excludes Latinos from the racial categories and assigns them to a separate category. Hispanics/Latinos may be of any race.
County	Location of County	Total Population	White alone (NH)	%	Black or African American alone (NH)	%	Native American or Alaska Native alone (NH)	%	Asian alone (NH)	%	Pacific Islander alone (NH)	%	Other race alone (NH)	%	Mixed race or Multiracial (NH)	%	Hispanic or Latino (any race)	%
Allen		12,526	10,991	87.75%	173	1.38%	135	1.08%	67	0.53%	2	0.02%	39	0.31%	617	4.93%	502	4.01%
Anderson		7,836	7,259	92.64%	26	0.33%	46	0.59%	47	0.60%	0	0.00%	26	0.33%	277	3.53%	155	1.98%
Atchison		16,348	13,925	85.18%	785	4.80%	78	0.48%	80	0.49%	6	0.04%	49	0.30%	842	5.15%	583	3.57%
Barber		4,228	3,814	90.21%	7	0.17%	34	0.80%	16	0.38%	5	0.12%	11	0.26%	179	4.23%	162	3.83%
Barton		25,493	19,911	78.10%	293	1.15%	90	0.35%	80	0.31%	3	0.01%	63	0.25%	926	3.63%	4,127	16.19%
Bourbon		14,360	12,451	86.71%	454	3.16%	88	0.61%	98	0.68%	2	0.01%	40	0.28%	841	5.86%	386	2.69%
Brown		9,508	7,683	80.81%	97	1.02%	795	8.36%	42	0.44%	6	0.06%	25	0.26%	508	5.34%	352	3.70%
Butler		67,380	56,846	84.37%	1,398	2.07%	489	0.73%	996	1.48%	37	0.05%	222	0.33%	3,814	5.66%	3,578	5.31%
Chase		2,572	2,228	86.63%	18	0.70%	8	0.31%	8	0.31%	1	0.04%	9	0.35%	78	3.03%	222	8.63%
Chautauqua		3,379	2,822	83.52%	23	0.68%	185	5.47%	18	0.53%	0	0.00%	2	0.06%	191	5.65%	138	4.08%
Cherokee		19,362	16,241	83.88%	79	0.41%	771	3.98%	65	0.34%	26	0.13%	34	0.18%	1,632	8.43%	514	2.65%
Cheyenne		2,616	2,223	84.98%	6	0.23%	7	0.27%	12	0.46%	0	0.00%	4	0.15%	126	4.82%	238	9.10%
Clark		1,991	1,668	83.78%	1	0.05%	20	1.00%	24	1.21%	1	0.05%	7	0.35%	67	3.37%	203	10.20%
Clay		8,117	7,486	92.23%	50	0.62%	34	0.42%	49	0.60%	0	0.00%	10	0.12%	270	3.33%	218	2.69%
Cloud		9,032	8,235	91.18%	123	1.36%	40	0.44%	40	0.44%	4	0.04%	11	0.12%	260	2.88%	319	3.53%
Coffey		8,360	7,670	91.75%	45	0.54%	36	0.43%	44	0.53%	1	0.01%	19	0.23%	324	3.88%	221	2.64%
Comanche		1,689	1,520	89.99%	10	0.59%	2	0.12%	0	0.00%	1	0.06%	3	0.18%	55	3.26%	98	5.80%
Cowley		34,549	26,227	75.91%	865	2.50%	626	1.81%	499	1.44%	179	0.52%	73	0.21%	2,109	6.10%	3,971	11.49%
Crawford		38,972	31,937	81.95%	899	2.31%	320	0.82%	461	1.18%	191	0.49%	120	0.31%	2,328	5.97%	2,716	6.97%
Decatur		2,764	2,565	92.80%	9	0.33%	7	0.25%	10	0.36%	0	0.00%	3	0.11%	94	3.40%	76	2.75%
Dickinson		18,402	16,451	89.40%	105	0.57%	74	0.40%	74	0.40%	20	0.11%	68	0.37%	705	3.83%	905	4.92%
Doniphan		7,510	6,614	88.07%	266	3.54%	66	0.88%	32	0.43%	19	0.25%	28	0.37%	281	3.74%	204	2.72%
Douglas		118,785	90,281	76.00%	5,104	4.30%	2,579	2.17%	4,657	3.92%	84	0.07%	523	0.44%	7,262	6.11%	8,295	6.98%
Edwards		2,907	2,157	74.20%	14	0.48%	15	0.52%	1	0.03%	1	0.03%	2	0.07%	94	3.23%	623	21.43%
Elk		2,483	2,214	89.17%	1	0.04%	43	1.73%	3	0.12%	0	0.00%	0	0.00%	121	4.87%	101	4.07%
Ellis		28,934	25,109	86.78%	318	1.10%	65	0.22%	265	0.92%	0	0.00%	82	0.28%	1,079	3.73%	2,016	6.97%
Ellsworth		6,376	5,455	85.56%	254	3.98%	39	0.61%	23	0.36%	0	0.00%	8	0.13%	232	3.64%	365	5.72%
Finney		38,470	14,514	37.73%	1,362	3.54%	164	0.43%	1,512	3.93%	3	0.01%	155	0.40%	877	2.28%	19,883	51.68%
Ford		34,287	12,455	36.33%	885	2.58%	101	0.29%	394	1.15%	6	0.02%	90	0.26%	690	2.01%	19,666	57.36%
Franklin		25,996	22,818	87.78%	303	1.17%	190	0.73%	103	0.40%	7	0.03%	78	0.30%	1,350	5.19%	1,147	4.41%
Geary		36,739	19,957	54.32%	6,062	16.50%	207	0.56%	1,183	3.22%	452	1.23%	189	0.51%	2,913	7.93%	5,776	15.72%
Gove		2,718	2,486	91.46%	3	0.11%	3	0.11%	15	0.55%	1	0.04%	16	0.59%	111	4.08%	83	3.05%
Graham		2,415	2,179	90.23%	55	2.28%	8	0.33%	14	0.58%	0	0.00%	14	0.58%	83	3.44%	62	2.57%
Grant		7,352	3,211	43.68%	10	0.14%	55	0.75%	8	0.11%	3	0.04%	10	0.14%	193	2.63%	3,862	52.53%
Gray		5,653	4,629	81.89%	19	0.34%	5	0.09%	14	0.25%	0	0.00%	8	0.14%	139	2.46%	839	14.84%
Greeley		1,284	1,036	80.69%	0	0.00%	4	0.31%	5	0.39%	0	0.00%	10	0.78%	30	2.34%	199	15.50%
Greenwood		6,016	5,406	89.86%	28	0.47%	32	0.53%	36	0.60%	1	0.02%	15	0.25%	294	4.89%	204	3.39%
Hamilton		2,518	1,361	54.05%	10	0.40%	12	0.48%	5	0.20%	0	0.00%	2	0.08%	44	1.75%	1,084	43.05%
Harper		5,485	4,714	85.94%	16	0.29%	74	1.35%	15	0.27%	2	0.04%	4	0.07%	235	4.28%	425	7.75%
Harvey		34,024	27,349	80.38%	596	1.75%	183	0.54%	260	0.76%	10	0.03%	82	0.24%	1,489	4.38%	4,055	11.92%
Haskell		3,780	2,578	68.20%	9	0.24%	8	0.21%	1	0.03%	0	0.00%	7	0.19%	58	1.53%	1,119	29.60%
Hodgeman		1,723	1,546	89.73%	14	0.81%	7	0.41%	10	0.58%	1	0.06%	2	0.12%	47	2.73%	96	5.57%
Jackson		13,232	10,534	79.61%	95	0.72%	1,098	8.30%	29	0.22%	18	0.14%	37	0.28%	791	5.98%	630	4.76%
Jefferson		18,368	16,549	90.10%	99	0.54%	124	0.68%	41	0.22%	27	0.15%	29	0.16%	932	5.07%	567	3.09%
Jewell		2,932	2,743	93.55%	4	0.14%	10	0.34%	10	0.34%	0	0.00%	8	0.27%	95	3.24%	62	2.11%
Johnson		609,863	460,399	75.49%	28,092	4.61%	1,595	0.26%	32,856	5.39%	346	0.06%	2,393	0.39%	29,793	4.89%	54,389	8.92%
Kearny		3,983	2,378	59.70%	34	0.85%	10	0.25%	5	0.13%	1	0.03%	2	0.05%	157	3.94%	1,396	35.05%
Kingman		7,470	6,829	91.42%	28	0.37%	27	0.36%	33	0.44%	4	0.05%	16	0.21%	265	3.55%	268	3.59%
Kiowa		2,460	2,158	87.72%	43	1.75%	10	0.41%	16	0.65%	4	0.16%	6	0.24%	136	5.53%	87	3.54%
Labette		20,184	16,077	79.65%	838	4.15%	425	2.11%	90	0.45%	9	0.04%	43	0.21%	1,763	8.73%	939	4.65%
Lane		1,574	1,375	87.36%	0	0.00%	8	0.51%	0	0.00%	2	0.13%	0	0.00%	46	2.92%	143	9.09%
Leavenworth		81,881	62,503	76.33%	6,656	8.13%	589	0.72%	1,060	1.29%	138	0.17%	253	0.31%	5,080	6.20%	5,602	6.84%
Lincoln		2,939	2,691	91.56%	6	0.20%	13	0.44%	8	0.27%	0	0.00%	12	0.41%	79	2.69%	130	4.42%
Linn		9,591	8,782	91.57%	62	0.65%	46	0.48%	20	0.21%	8	0.08%	16	0.17%	419	4.37%	238	2.48%
Logan		2,762	2,457	88.96%	4	0.14%	0	0.00%	10	0.36%	2	0.07%	10	0.36%	84	3.04%	195	7.06%
Lyon		32,179	22,219	69.05%	599	1.86%	122	0.38%	566	1.76%	5	0.02%	225	0.70%	1,187	3.69%	7,256	22.55%
McPherson		30,223	26,519	87.74%	475	1.57%	93	0.31%	213	0.70%	8	0.03%	140	0.46%	1,183	3.91%	1,592	5.27%
Marion		11,823	10,750	90.92%	118	1.00%	35	0.30%	39	0.33%	7	0.06%	67	0.57%	365	3.09%	442	3.74%
Marshall		10,038	9,410	93.74%	39	0.39%	23	0.23%	41	0.41%	0	0.00%	13	0.13%	285	2.84%	227	2.26%
Meade		4,055	3,053	75.29%	37	0.91%	9	0.22%	13	0.32%	0	0.00%	6	0.15%	140	3.45%	797	19.65%
Miami		34,191	30,472	89.12%	430	1.26%	152	0.44%	161	0.47%	8	0.02%	86	0.25%	1,686	4.93%	1,196	3.50%
Mitchell		5,796	5,436	93.79%	19	0.33%	12	0.21%	13	0.22%	0	0.00%	2	0.03%	157	2.71%	157	2.71%
Montgomery		31,486	23,571	74.86%	1,533	4.87%	946	3.00%	191	0.61%	24	0.08%	72	0.23%	2,735	8.69%	2,414	7.67%
Morris		5,386	4,897	90.92%	16	0.30%	10	0.19%	18	0.33%	1	0.02%	12	0.22%	205	3.81%	227	4.21%
Morton		2,701	1,940	71.83%	17	0.63%	10	0.37%	31	1.15%	9	0.33%	12	0.44%	91	3.37%	591	21.88%
Nemaha		10,273	9,622	93.66%	64	0.62%	26	0.25%	35	0.34%	7	0.07%	10	0.10%	243	2.37%	266	2.59%
Neosho		15,904	13,767	86.56%	131	0.82%	127	0.80%	84	0.53%	6	0.04%	25	0.16%	854	5.37%	910	5.72%
Ness		2,687	2,305	85.78%	2	0.07%	9	0.33%	2	0.07%	0	0.00%	6	0.22%	58	2.16%	305	11.35%
Norton		5,459	4,690	85.91%	199	3.65%	33	0.60%	35	0.64%	2	0.04%	9	0.16%	180	3.30%	311	5.70%
Osage		15,766	14,505	92.00%	33	0.21%	43	0.27%	52	0.33%	3	0.02%	24	0.15%	649	4.12%	457	2.90%
Osborne		3,500	3,285	93.86%	1	0.03%	19	0.54%	18	0.51%	0	0.00%	3	0.09%	108	3.09%	66	1.89%
Ottawa		5,735	5,268	91.86%	30	0.52%	22	0.38%	10	0.17%	0	0.00%	15	0.26%	246	4.29%	144	2.51%
Pawnee		6,253	5,154	82.42%	246	3.93%	24	0.38%	28	0.45%	0	0.00%	27	0.43%	252	4.03%	522	8.35%
Phillips		4,981	4,620	92.75%	19	0.38%	22	0.44%	15	0.30%	1	0.02%	0	0.00%	162	3.25%	142	2.85%
Pottawatomie		25,348	22,065	87.05%	271	1.07%	109	0.43%	194	0.77%	27	0.11%	70	0.28%	1,183	4.67%	1,429	5.64%
Pratt		9,157	7,872	85.97%	106	1.16%	40	0.44%	45	0.49%	7	0.08%	36	0.39%	310	3.39%	741	8.09%
Rawlins		2,561	2,242	87.54%	18	0.70%	3	0.12%	11	0.43%	0	0.00%	12	0.47%	116	4.53%	159	6.21%
Reno		61,898	50,316	81.29%	1,744	2.82%	397	0.64%	333	0.54%	41	0.07%	173	0.28%	2,798	4.52%	6,096	9.85%
Republic		4,674	4,402	94.18%	15	0.32%	13	0.28%	11	0.24%	9	0.19%	0	0.00%	133	2.85%	91	1.95%
Rice		9,427	7,520	79.77%	130	1.38%	41	0.43%	30	0.32%	0	0.00%	14	0.15%	402	4.26%	1,290	13.68%
Riley		71,959	51,807	72.00%	4,759	6.61%	305	0.42%	3,325	4.62%	224	0.31%	413	0.57%	3,656	5.08%	7,470	10.38%
Rooks		4,919	4,558	92.66%	28	0.57%	2	0.04%	5	0.10%	9	0.18%	7	0.14%	194	3.94%	116	2.36%
Rush		2,956	2,745	92.86%	6	0.20%	3	0.10%	14	0.47%	0	0.00%	0	0.00%	56	1.89%	132	4.47%
Russell		6,691	6,039	90.26%	60	0.90%	29	0.43%	28	0.42%	0	0.00%	13	0.19%	286	4.27%	236	3.53%
Saline		54,303	41,506	76.43%	1,732	3.19%	233	0.43%	1,109	2.04%	26	0.05%	162	0.30%	2,893	5.33%	6,642	12.23%
Scott		5,151	3,895	75.62%	13	0.25%	20	0.39%	15	0.29%	2	0.04%	3	0.06%	176	3.42%	1,027	19.94%
Sedgwick		523,824	336,271	64.20%	45,076	8.61%	4,450	0.85%	22,205	4.24%	513	0.10%	1,979	0.38%	30,700	5.86%	82,630	15.77%
Seward		21,964	5,928	26.99%	611	2.78%	66	0.30%	517	2.35%	1	0.00%	42	0.19%	393	1.79%	14,406	65.59%
Shawnee		178,909	125,873	70.36%	13,531	7.56%	1,575	0.88%	2,480	1.39%	162	0.09%	597	0.33%	10,830	6.05%	23,861	13.34%
Sheridan		2,447	2,212	90.40%	0	0.00%	7	0.29%	12	0.49%	2	0.08%	1	0.04%	68	2.78%	145	5.93%
Sherman		5,927	4,798	80.95%	103	1.74%	12	0.20%	13	0.22%	1	0.02%	15	0.25%	212	3.58%	773	13.04%
Smith		3,570	3,370	94.40%	12	0.34%	15	0.42%	9	0.25%	0	0.00%	5	0.14%	92	2.58%	67	1.88%
Stafford		4,072	3,364	82.61%	14	0.34%	21	0.52%	12	0.29%	0	0.00%	2	0.05%	156	3.83%	503	12.35%
Stanton		2,084	1,074	51.54%	7	0.34%	21	1.01%	2	0.10%	0	0.00%	0	0.00%	71	3.41%	909	43.62%
Stevens		5,250	3,007	57.28%	20	0.38%	20	0.38%	22	0.42%	0	0.00%	16	0.30%	145	2.76%	2,020	38.48%
Sumner		22,382	19,347	86.44%	200	0.89%	215	0.96%	73	0.33%	0	0.00%	93	0.42%	1,200	5.36%	1,254	5.60%
Thomas		7,930	6,910	87.14%	106	1.34%	12	0.15%	47	0.59%	0	0.00%	24	0.30%	199	2.51%	632	7.97%
Trego		2,808	2,627	93.55%	4	0.14%	4	0.14%	12	0.43%	0	0.00%	2	0.07%	95	3.38%	64	2.28%
Wabaunsee		6,877	6,185	89.94%	31	0.45%	29	0.42%	12	0.17%	4	0.06%	21	0.31%	278	4.04%	317	4.61%
Wallace		1,512	1,344	88.89%	3	0.20%	1	0.07%	0	0.00%	2	0.13%	3	0.20%	79	5.22%	80	5.29%
Washington		5,530	5,084	91.93%	13	0.24%	2	0.04%	4	0.07%	2	0.04%	6	0.11%	144	2.60%	275	4.97%
Wichita		2,152	1,412	65.61%	1	0.05%	8	0.37%	0	0.00%	2	0.09%	6	0.28%	87	4.04%	636	29.55%
Wilson		8,624	7,679	89.04%	21	0.24%	79	0.92%	35	0.41%	2	0.02%	27	0.31%	520	6.03%	261	3.03%
Woodson		3,115	2,864	91.94%	8	0.26%	27	0.87%	0	0.00%	0	0.00%	7	0.22%	138	4.43%	71	2.28%
Wyandotte		169,245	63,079	37.27%	33,945	20.06%	725	0.43%	7,621	4.50%	364	0.22%	573	0.34%	7,124	4.21%	55,814	32.98%

== Former counties ==
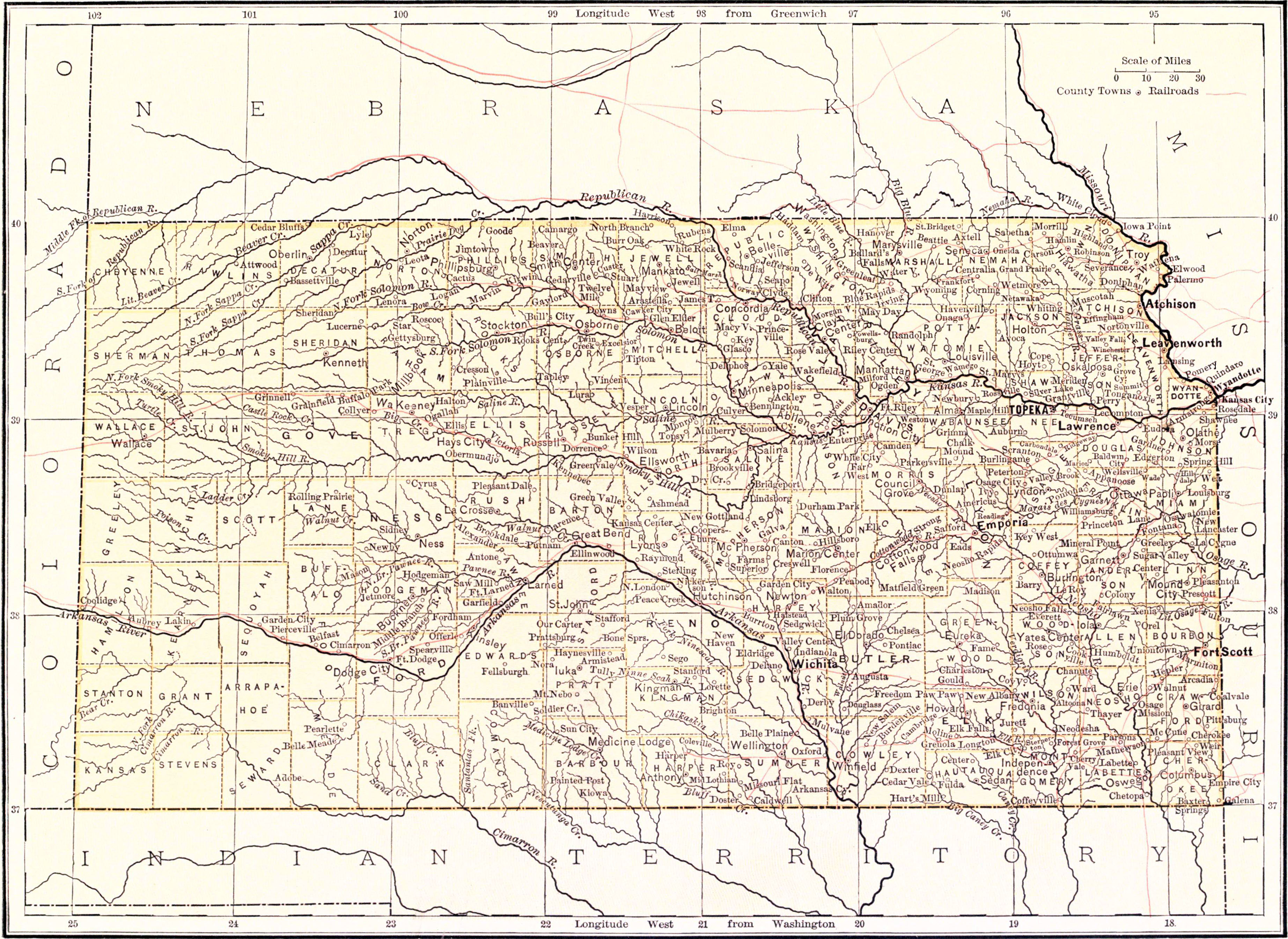
1881 map of Kansas, showing Arrapahoe, Buffalo, Kansas, Kearney, Sequoyah, St. John counties

1893 map of Kansas, showing Garfield and Kearney counties

Sortable table
County	Dates	Notes	Source
Washington	1855–57	One of 36 Original Counties.	
Seward	1861–67	Formerly part of Godfrey. Dissolved into Greenwood and Howard Counties.	
Godfrey	1855–61	One of the Original 36 Counties. Name changed to Seward around 1861.	
Hunter	1855–64	One of the Original 36 Counties. Dissolved into Butler County.	
Irving	1860–64	Formed from Hunter County. Dissolved into Butler County.	
Otoe	1860–64	Formed from Unorganized Area and dissolved into Butler County.	
Shirley	1860–67	Formed from Unorganized Area and renamed Cloud County.	
Peketon	1860–65	Formed from Unorganized Area and dissolved back into Unorganized Area.	
Madison	1855–61	One of the Original 36 Counties. Dissolved into Breckenridge and Greenwood.	
Howard	1867–75	Formed from Seward and Butler Counties. Dissolved into Chautauqua and Elk Counties.	
Arapahoe	1873–83	Formed from Unorganized Area. Dissolved into Finney County.	
Buffalo	1873–81	Formed from Unorganized Area. Dissolved into Gray County.	
Foote	1873–81	Dissolved into Ford and Finney Counties.	
Kansas	1873–83	Formed from Unorganized Area. Dissolved into Seward County.	
Sequoyah	1873–83	Formed from Unorganized Area. Dissolved into Finney County.	
Garfield	1887–93	Formed from Finney and Hodgeman Counties and merged into Finney County.	
Billings	1873–74	Created from Norton County and returned to Norton County.	
Davis	1855–89	One of 36 Original Counties, now part of Geary County.	
Breckinridge	1855–62	Now Lyon County.	

St. John County was established in 1881, and formed from the area to the east of range 38 in what was then part of Wallace County. In 1887, the name was changed to Logan County.

Kearney County was established on March 6, 1873, and was dissolved in 1883, with the land area being split between Hamilton and Finney counties. It was reestablished with its original borders in 1887, and organized on March 27, 1888. In 1889, the name was corrected to Kearny County (without an extra "e") to match the last name of Philip Kearny.

== See also ==
- List of townships in Kansas
- List of cities in Kansas
- List of unincorporated communities in Kansas
- List of census-designated places in Kansas
- List of ghost towns in Kansas
- Lists of places in Kansas
- Kansas locations by per capita income
- Kansas census statistical areas
- Kansas license plate county codes
