= National Register of Historic Places listings in Morton County, Kansas =

Location of Morton County in Kansas

This is a list of the National Register of Historic Places listings in Morton County, Kansas. It is intended to be a complete list of the properties and districts on the National Register of Historic Places in Morton County, Kansas, United States. The locations of National Register properties and districts for which the latitude and longitude coordinates are included below, may be seen in an online map.

There are 7 properties and districts listed on the National Register in the county.

This National Park Service list is complete through NPS recent listings posted March 21, 2025.

== Current listings ==
	Name on the Register	Image	Date listed	Location	City or town	Description
1	Morton County WPA Bridge	Morton County WPA Bridge	October 22, 1986 (#86003356)	6 miles west and 4 miles north of Richfield; 37°19′06″N 101°54′02″W	Richfield	
2	Point of Rocks — Middle Spring Santa Fe Trail Historic District	Point of Rocks — Middle Spring Santa Fe Trail Historic District	April 10, 2013 (#13000151)	2.5 miles (4.0 km) south of K-51 and 2 miles (3.2 km) west of K-27; 37°06′14″N 101°56′19″W	Elkhart	
3	Santa Fe Trail — Cimarron National Grassland Segment 1	Santa Fe Trail — Cimarron National Grassland Segment 1	April 3, 2013 (#13000132)	2.0 miles (3.2 km) south of K-51 at Colorado–Kansas state line 37°06′35″N 102°02′30″W	Elkhart	
4	Santa Fe Trail — Cimarron National Grassland Segment 2		April 3, 2013 (#13000133)	1.66 miles (2.67 km) south of K-51 and 1 mile (1.6 km) east of County Road 2; 37°07′04″N 102°00′14″W	Elkhart	
5	Santa Fe Trail — Cimarron National Grassland Segment 3	Santa Fe Trail — Cimarron National Grassland Segment 3	April 3, 2013 (#13000134)	FSR-600, east and west sides of K-27; 37°07′34″N 101°53′58″W	Elkhart	
6	Santa Fe Trail — Cimarron National Grassland Segment 4		April 3, 2013 (#13000135)	2.5 miles (4.0 km) east of K-27, north of FSR-600; 37°08′48″N 101°51′00″W	Elkhart	
7	Santa Fe Trail — Cimarron National Grassland Segment 5	Santa Fe Trail — Cimarron National Grassland Segment 5	April 3, 2013 (#13000136)	7 miles (11 km) north of US-56 along County Road 16; 37°10′09″N 101°46′23″W	Wilburton	

== See also ==
- List of National Historic Landmarks in Kansas
- National Register of Historic Places listings in Kansas
