= West Center Township, Kansas =

Township in Stevens County, Kansas, U.S.

West Center Township
- Township
- Location within Stevens County
- Coordinates: 37.191923°N 101.456514°W
- Country: United States
- State: Kansas
- County: Stevens

Area
  - Total: 98.837 sq mi (255.99 km^{2})
  - Land: 98.837 sq mi (255.99 km^{2})
  - Water: 0 sq mi (0 km^{2}) 0%

Population (2020)
  - Total: 160
  - Density: 1.6/sq mi (0.63/km^{2})
- Time zone: UTC-6 (CST)
  - Summer (DST): UTC-5 (CDT)
- Area code: 620
- GNIS feature ID: 485084

West Center Township is a township in Stevens County, Kansas, United States. As of the 2020 census, its population was 160.

== Geography ==
West Center Township covers an area of 98.837 square miles (255.99 square kilometers). Part of Cimarron National Grassland lies within the township.

=== Communities ===
- part of Hugoton

=== Adjacent townships ===
Harmony Township, Stevens County
Richfield Township, Morton County	northwest	north
Rolla Township, Morton County	west	self	east	Center Township, Stevens County
		south
Voorhees Township, Stevens County

== Transportation ==
Hugoton Municipal Airport, which serves the city of Hugoton, lies within the township.

=== Major highways ===
- US-56
- K-25
- K-51

== Demographics ==
As of the 2020 census, there were 160 people and 91 households residing in the township. The population density was 1.6 people per square mile (0.62 people/km^{2}). There were 91 housing units. The racial makeup of the township was 94.4% White, 3.1% from some other race, and 2.5% from two or more races. Hispanics or Latinos of any race were 10.0% of the population.

There were 91 households: 67.0% were married couples living together, 26.4% had a male householder with no spouse present, and 6.6% had a female householder with no spouse present. The average family size was 4.25 people. 27.0% of people in the township older than 24 had a college degree, and the township had an employment rate of 64.8%.
