= Taloga Township, Kansas =

Township in Morton County, Kansas, U.S.

Taloga Township
- Township
- Location within Morton County
- Coordinates: 37.060309°N 101.881233°W
- Country: United States
- State: Kansas
- County: Morton

Area
  - Total: 55.05 sq mi (142.6 km^{2})
  - Land: 55.05 sq mi (142.6 km^{2})
  - Water: 0 sq mi (0 km^{2}) 0%

Population (2020)
  - Total: 1,978
  - Density: 35.93/sq mi (13.87/km^{2})
- Time zone: UTC-6 (CST)
  - Summer (DST): UTC-5 (CDT)
- Area code: 620

Taloga Township is a township in Morton County, Kansas, United States. As of the 2020 census, its population was 1,978.

== Geography ==
Taloga Township covers an area of 55.05 square miles (142.6 square kilometers). Part of Cimarron National Grassland is located within the township.

=== Communities ===
- Elkhart

=== Adjacent townships ===
- Richfield Township, Morton County (northeast)
- Cimarron Township, Morton County (east)
- Jones Township, Morton County (west)
- Westola Township, Morton County (northwest)

=== Major highways ===
- US-56
- K-27
