= Richfield Township, Kansas =

Township in Morton County, Kansas, U.S.

Richfield Township
- Township
- Location within Morton County
- Coordinates: 37.283523°N 101.735015°W
- Country: United States
- State: Kansas
- County: Morton

Area
  - Total: 250.379 sq mi (648.48 km^{2})
  - Land: 250.305 sq mi (648.29 km^{2})
  - Water: 0.074 sq mi (0.19 km^{2}) 0.03%

Population (2020)
  - Total: 139
  - Density: 0.555/sq mi (0.214/km^{2})
- Time zone: UTC-6 (CST)
  - Summer (DST): UTC-5 (CDT)
- Area code: 620

Richfield Township is a township in Morton County, Kansas, United States. As of the 2020 census, its population was 139.

== Geography ==
Richfield Township covers an area of 250.379 square miles (648.48 square kilometers). Part of Cimarron National Grassland is located within the township.

=== Communities ===
- Richfield

=== Adjacent townships ===
- Stanton Township, Stanton County (north)
- Big Bow Township, Stanton County (northeast)
- Harmony Township, Stevens County (east)
- West Center Township, Stevens County (southeast)
- Rolla Township, Morton County (south-southeast)
- Cimarron Township, Morton County (south)
- Taloga Township, Morton County (southwest)
- Westola Township, Morton County (west)
- Manter Township, Stanton County (northwest)

=== Major highways ===
- K-27
- K-51
