= Point of Rocks (Kansas) =

Coordinates: 37°06′14″N 101°56′20″W

- Point of Rocks--Middle Spring Santa Fe Trail Historic District
- U.S. National Register of Historic Places
- Location within Kansas
- Nearest city: Elkhart, Kansas
- Area: 467.5 acres (189.2 ha)
- MPS: Santa Fe Trail MPS
- NRHP reference No.: 13000151
- Added to NRHP: April 10, 2013

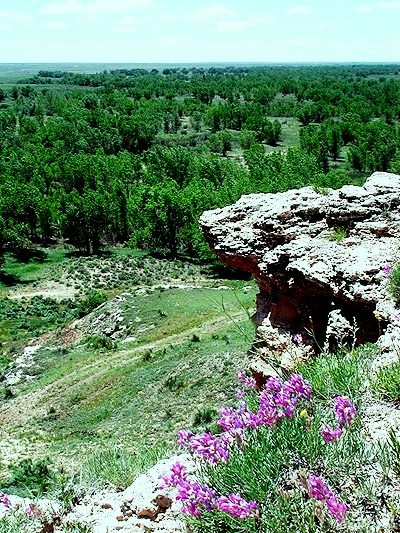
Point of Rocks overlooking the wooded valley of the Cimarron River.

Point of Rocks is a cliff in Morton County, Kansas, which was one of three landmarks by the same name on the Santa Fe Trail. This one was on the Cimarron Cutoff. It is now part of the Cimarron National Grassland.

The bluff overlooks the north side of the Cimarron River and lies approximately seven miles north of Elkhart, west of K-27. Point of Rocks has been an important landmark for travelers to this region of Kansas. It signifies the closeness of springs and thus water. Many springs are known to exist in the region of the Cimarron River near Point of Rocks. Because of this, Point of Rocks was an important landmark for travelers heading west on the Cimarron Cutoff and for modern-day ranchers. Point of Rocks is the third-highest point in the state of Kansas, with an elevation of 3,540 feet (1,080 m) at its summit.

Point of Rocks-Middle Spring Santa Fe Trail Historic District, which includes the cliff, a spring, and four Santa Fe trail segments, is listed on the National Register of Historic Places.

An overlook on the Point of Rocks looks out over the former Point of Rocks ranch area. The overlook includes interpretative displays.

There are also multiple fishing ponds located a little east of the rocks, where you can fish for rainbow trout and channel catfish during the year.

The rocks are known to contain fossils, and some even have small caves of that you can explore.

A DAR monument was placed on the Point of Rocks in April 1914. Soon after, on May 1, 1914, the a flood of the Cimarron River destroyed hay and numerous buildings of the Point of Rocks ranch, as well as drowning two daughters of the Brite family.

The district was added to the National Register on April 10, 2013.
