= Rolla Township, Kansas =

Township in Morton County, Kansas, U.S.

Rolla Township
- Township
- Location within Morton County
- Coordinates: 37.111375°N 101.634733°W
- Country: United States
- State: Kansas
- County: Morton

Area
  - Total: 144.064 sq mi (373.12 km^{2})
  - Land: 144.064 sq mi (373.12 km^{2})
  - Water: 0 sq mi (0 km^{2}) 0%

Population (2020)
  - Total: 480
  - Density: 3.3/sq mi (1.3/km^{2})
- Time zone: UTC-6 (CST)
  - Summer (DST): UTC-5 (CDT)
- Area code: 620

Rolla Township is a township in Morton County, Kansas, United States. As of the 2020 census, its population was 480.

== Geography ==
Rolla Township covers an area of 144.064 square miles (373.12 square kilometers). Part of Cimarron National Grassland is located within the township.

=== Communities ===
- Rolla

=== Adjacent townships ===
- Richfield Township, Morton County (north)
- West Center Township, Stevens County (northeast)
- Voorhees Township, Stevens County (east)
- Cimarron Township, Morton County (west)

=== Major highways ===
- US-56
- K-51
