= Jones Township, Kansas =

Township in Morton County, Kansas, U.S.

Jones Township
- Township
- Location within Morton County
- Coordinates: 37.05998°N 101.988759°W
- Country: United States
- State: Kansas
- County: Morton

Area
  - Total: 54.234 sq mi (140.47 km^{2})
  - Land: 54.234 sq mi (140.47 km^{2})
  - Water: 0 sq mi (0 km^{2}) 0%

Population (2020)
  - Total: 11
  - Density: 0.20/sq mi (0.078/km^{2})
- Time zone: UTC-6 (CST)
  - Summer (DST): UTC-5 (CDT)
- Area code: 620

Jones Township is a township in Morton County, Kansas, United States. As of the 2020 census, its population was 11.

== Geography ==
Jones Township covers an area of 54.234 square miles (140.47 square kilometers). Part of Cimarron National Grassland is located within the township. Jones Township is the most southwestern township in Kansas.

=== Adjacent townships ===
- Westola Township, Morton County (north)
- Taloga Township, Morton County (east)
