= Cimarron Township, Morton County, Kansas =

Township in Morton County, Kansas, U.S.

Cimarron Township
- Township
- Location within Morton County
- Coordinates: 37.074997°N 101.772778°W
- Country: United States
- State: Kansas
- County: Morton

Area
  - Total: 66.891 sq mi (173.25 km^{2})
  - Land: 66.891 sq mi (173.25 km^{2})
  - Water: 0 sq mi (0 km^{2}) 0%

Population (2020)
  - Total: 54
  - Density: 0.81/sq mi (0.31/km^{2})
- Time zone: UTC-6 (CST)
  - Summer (DST): UTC-5 (CDT)
- Area code: 620

Cimarron Township is a township in Morton County, Kansas, United States. As of the 2020 census, its population was 54.

== Geography ==
Cimarron Township covers an area of 66.891 square miles (173.25 square kilometers). Part of Cimarron National Grassland is located within the township.

=== Adjacent townships ===
- Richfield Township, Morton County (north)
- Rolla Township, Morton County (east)
- Taloga Township, Morton County (west)

=== Major highways ===
- US-56
