= Elkhart Airport =

Elkhart Airport may refer to:

- Elkhart Municipal Airport, in Elkhart, Indiana, United States
- Elkhart-Morton County Airport, in Elkhart, Kansas, United States
