= Westola Township, Kansas =

Township in Morton County, Kansas, U.S.

Westola Township
- Township
- Location within Morton County
- Coordinates: 37.244068°N 101.948875°W
- Country: United States
- State: Kansas
- County: Morton

Area
  - Total: 159.309 sq mi (412.61 km^{2})
  - Land: 159.187 sq mi (412.29 km^{2})
  - Water: 0.122 sq mi (0.32 km^{2}) 0.08%

Population (2020)
  - Total: 39
  - Density: 0.24/sq mi (0.095/km^{2})
- Time zone: UTC-6 (CST)
  - Summer (DST): UTC-5 (CDT)
- Area code: 620

Westola Township is a township in Morton County, Kansas, United States. As of the 2020 census, its population was 39.

== Geography ==
Westola Township covers an area of 159.309 square miles (412.61 square kilometers). Part of Cimarron National Grassland is located within the township.

=== Adjacent townships ===
- Manter Township, Stanton County (north)
- Richfield Township, Morton County (east)
- Taloga Township, Morton County (southeast)
- Jones Township, Morton County (south)

=== Major highways ===
- K-27
- K-51
