= J. Floyd Breeding =

American politician

James Floyd Breeding
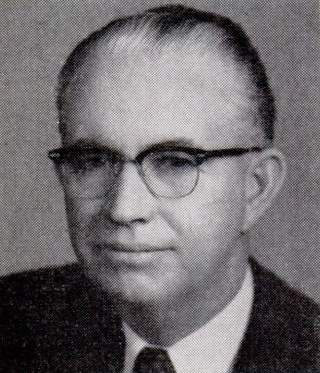

Member of the U.S. House of Representatives from Kansas's 5th district
- In office January 3, 1957 – January 3, 1963
- Preceded by: Clifford R. Hope
- Succeeded by: Bob Dole (redistricting)

Member of the Kansas House of Representatives
- In office 1947-1949

Personal details
- Born: September 28, 1901 Robinson, Kansas
- Died: October 17, 1977 (aged 76) Dodge City, Kansas
- Party: Democratic

James Floyd Breeding (September 28, 1901 – October 17, 1977) was a U.S. representative from Kansas.

== Early life ==
Born near Robinson, Kansas, Breeding was educated in grade schools, Moonlight, Kansas, and Berryton High School in Shawnee County, Kansas. He attended Kansas State College at Manhattan in 1921 and 1922. He moved to Rolla, Kansas, in 1928. Farmer-stockman near Rolla, Morton County from 1928 to 1956. He served as member of State house of representatives 1947-1949, serving as minority leader in 1949 session. He served as Democratic nominee for Lieutenant Governor of Kansas in 1950. He served as president of Western Kansas Development Association in 1951. He served as delegate to the Democratic National Conventions in 1960 and 1964.

Breeding was elected as a Democrat to the Eighty-fifth and to the two succeeding Congresses (January 3, 1957 – January 3, 1963). He was an unsuccessful candidate for reelection in 1962 to the Eighty-eighth Congress, after his Fifth District in southwest Kansas was merged with Bob Dole's Sixth District in northwest Kansas. He was appointed by President Kennedy as assistant to Secretary of Agriculture, Grain and Feed Division from 1963 to 1966. He was an unsuccessful candidate for election to the United States Senate in 1966. He died in Dodge City, Kansas on October 17, 1977. He was interred in Rolla Cemetery, Rolla, Kansas.

Party political offices
Preceded by L. F. Meyers	Democratic nominee for Lieutenant Governor of Kansas; 1950	Succeeded by Robert L. Bock
Preceded by Paul L. Aylward	Democratic nominee for U.S. Senator from Kansas (Class 2); 1966	Succeeded by Arch Tetzlaff
U.S. House of Representatives
Preceded by Clifford R. Hope	Member of the U.S. House of Representatives from Kansas's 5th congressional district 1957–1963	Succeeded by Joe Skubitz
