= Clifford R. Hope =

American politician (1893–1970)

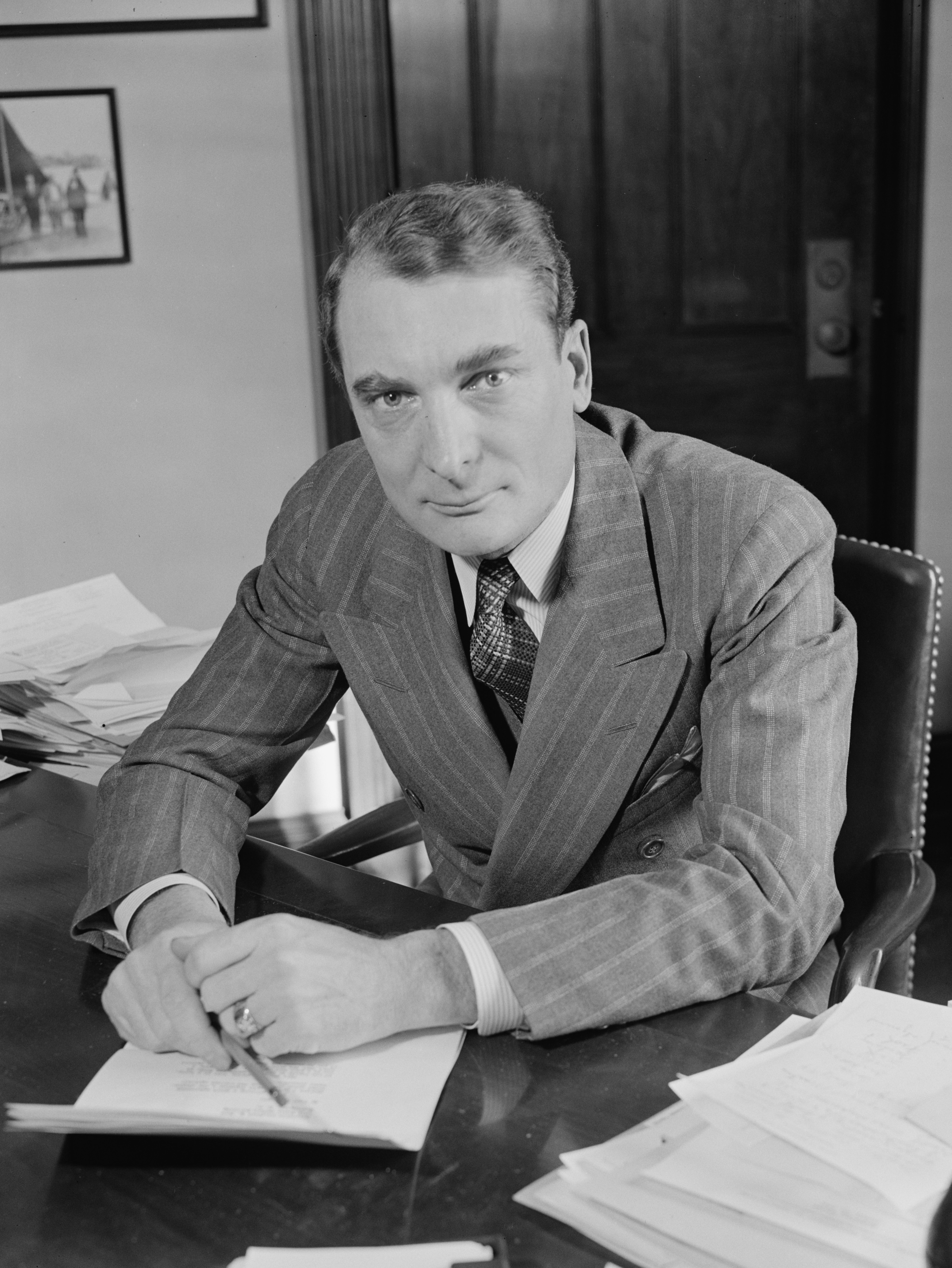

Member of the U.S. House of Representatives from Kansas
- In office March 4, 1927 – January 3, 1957
- Preceded by: Jasper N. Tincher
- Succeeded by: James F. Breeding
- Constituency: 7th district (1927-43); 5th district (1943-57)

Personal details
- Born: June 9, 1893 Birmingham, Iowa, U.S.
- Died: May 16, 1970 (aged 76) Garden City, Kansas, U.S.
- Party: Republican
- Education: Nebraska Wesleyan University; Washburn Law School

Military service
- Allegiance: United States
- Branch/service: United States Army
- Years of service: 1917–1919
- Rank: Second Lieutenant
- Battles/wars: World War I

Clifford Ragsdale Hope (June 9, 1893 – May 16, 1970) was a U.S. representative from Kansas, and a member of the Republican Party. Born in Birmingham, Iowa, Hope attended public schools and Nebraska Wesleyan University, in Lincoln, Nebraska. He served during the First World War, as a second lieutenant. He served in the Kansas House of Representatives. He was elected to the Seventieth United States Congress in 1927 and served in Congress through 1957, making him the longest-serving Kansan in the United States House of Representatives.

After leaving office, Hope served as president of Great Plains Wheat Inc. of Garden City, Kansas, from 1959 to 1963. He died as a result of a stroke on May 16, 1970.

U.S. House of Representatives
Preceded by Jasper N. Tincher	Member of the U.S. House of Representatives from Kansas's 7th congressional district 1927 – 1943	District abolished
Preceded by John M. Houston	Member of the U.S. House of Representatives from Kansas's 5th congressional district 1943 – 1957	Succeeded by James F. Breeding
Political offices
Preceded by John W. Flannagan, Jr.	Chairman of the House Agriculture Committee; 1947 – 1949	Succeeded by Harold D. Cooley
Preceded by Harold D. Cooley	Chairman of the House Agriculture Committee; 1953 – 1955	Succeeded by Harold D. Cooley
