= Elkhart–Morton County Airport =

- IATA: none; ICAO: KEHA; FAA LID: EHA

Summary
- Airport type: Public
- Owner: Morton County
- Serves: Elkhart, Kansas
- Elevation AMSL: 3,622 ft (1,104 m)
- Coordinates: 37°00′03″N 101°52′48″W
- Interactive map of Elkhart–Morton County Airport

Runways
Direction	Length		Surface
Direction	ft	m	Surface
4/22	4,900	1,494	Asphalt
17/35	4,900	1,494	Asphalt

Statistics (2007)
- Aircraft operations: 6,000
- Based aircraft: 12
- Source: Federal Aviation Administration

Elkhart–Morton County Airport (ICAO: KEHA, FAA LID: EHA) is a county-owned public-use airport located one nautical mile (1.85 km) east of the central business district of Elkhart, a city in Morton County, Kansas, United States.

Although most U.S. airports use the same three-letter location identifier for the FAA and IATA, this airport is assigned EHA by the FAA but has no designation from the IATA.

== Facilities and aircraft ==
Elkhart–Morton County Airport covers an area of 346 acres (140 ha) at an elevation of 3,622 feet (1,104 m) above mean sea level. It has two asphalt paved runways designated 4/22 and 17/35, each of which measure 4,900 by 60 feet (1,494 x 18 m).

For the 12-month period ending August 22, 2007, the airport had 6,000 general aviation aircraft operations, an average of 16 per day. At that time there were 12 aircraft based at this airport: 92% single-engine and 8% multi-engine.

== See also ==
- List of airports in Kansas
