= 1966 United States Senate election in Kansas =

- November 8, 1966
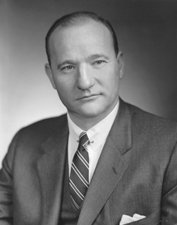

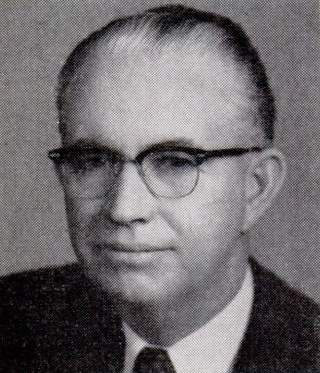
Nominee	James B. Pearson	J. Floyd Breeding
Party	Republican	Democratic
Popular vote	350,077	303,223
Percentage	52.15%	45.17%
- County results Pearson: 40–50% 50–60% 60–70% Breeding: 40–50% 50–60%
U.S. senator before election
James B. Pearson
Republican
Elected U.S. senator
James B. Pearson
Republican

The 1966 United States Senate election in Kansas took place on November 8, 1966, concurrently with elections to the United States Senate in other states as well as elections to the United States House of Representatives and various state and local elections.

Incumbent Republican U.S. Senator James B. Pearson defeated Democratic nominee James Floyd Breeding with 52.15% of the vote.

== Primary elections ==
Primary elections were held on August 2, 1966.

=== Democratic primary ===
==== Candidates ====
- James Floyd Breeding, former U.S. Representative for Kansas's 5th congressional district
- Harold S. Herd, incumbent State Senator
- K. L. "Ken" Smith, Democratic nominee for U.S. Senate in 1962
- J. Leigh Warner, insurance executive

==== Results ====
Democratic primary results
Party	Candidate	Votes	%
Democratic	James Floyd Breeding	51,860	49.92
Democratic	K. L. "Ken" Smith	19,433	18.71
Democratic	Harold S. Herd	16,963	16.33
Democratic	Leigh Warner	15,625	15.04
Total votes		103,881	100.00%

=== Republican primary ===
==== Candidates ====
- Ava V. Anderson
- Robert F. Ellsworth, incumbent U.S. Representative for Kansas's 3rd congressional district
- James B. Pearson, incumbent U.S. Senator
- William D. Tarrant, former mayor of Wichita

==== Results ====
Republican primary results
Party	Candidate	Votes	%
Republican	James B. Pearson (incumbent)	101,523	50.28
Republican	Robert F. Ellsworth	83,083	41.15
Republican	Ava V. Anderson	10,095	5.00
Republican	William D. Tarrant	7,222	3.58
Total votes		201,923	100.00

== General election ==
=== Candidates ===
- James B. Pearson (R)
- James Floyd Breeding (D)
- George W. Snell (C)
- Earl F. Dodgel (P), Prohibition nominee for Indiana's 2nd congressional district in 1960

=== Results ===
1966 United States Senate election in Kansas
Party	Candidate	Votes	%
Republican	James B. Pearson (Incumbent)	350,077	52.15
Democratic	James Floyd Breeding	303,223	45.17
Prohibition	Earl F. Dodge	9,364	1.39
Conservative	George W. Snell	7,103	1.06
None	Scattering	1,578	0.24
Majority		46,854	6.98
Turnout		671,345	
Republican hold			

== See also ==
- 1966 United States Senate elections

== Bibliography ==
- Congressional Elections, 1946-1996. Washington, D.C.: Congressional Quarterly Inc. 1998. ISBN 1-56802-248-4.
- Scammon, Richard M., ed. (1968). America Votes 7: a handbook of contemporary American election statistics, 1966. Washington, D.C.: Governmental Affairs Institute.
