= Mission Woods, Kansas =

- City
- Location within Johnson County and Kansas
- Interactive map of Mission Woods, Kansas
- Coordinates: 39°02′03″N 94°36′38″W
- Country: United States
- State: Kansas
- County: Johnson
- Founded: 1930s
- Incorporated: 1949

Area
  - Total: 0.089 sq mi (0.23 km^{2})
  - Land: 0.089 sq mi (0.23 km^{2})
  - Water: 0 sq mi (0.00 km^{2})
- Elevation: 890 ft (270 m)

Population (2020)
  - Total: 203
  - Density: 2,300/sq mi (880/km^{2})
- Time zone: UTC-6 (CST)
  - Summer (DST): UTC-5 (CDT)
- ZIP Code: 66205
- Area code: 913
- FIPS code: 20-47425
- GNIS ID: 485625
- Website: missionwoods-ks.org

Mission Woods is a city in Johnson County, Kansas, United States, and part of the Kansas City metropolitan area. In the 2020 census, the population of the city was 203.

== History ==
In the 1930s, J. C. Nichols laid out the Mission Hills subdivision and began construction. It was named from a Native American mission established at the site in the 19th century, and from the scenic wooded setting.

Mission Woods became a Google Fiber "fiberhood" in 2014.

== Geography ==
According to the United States Census Bureau, the city has a total area of 0.10 square miles (0.26 km^{2}), all land.

== Demographics ==
Historical population
Census	Pop.	Note	%±
1950	205		—
1960	243		18.5%
1970	237		−2.5%
1980	213		−10.1%
1990	182		−14.6%
2000	165		−9.3%
2010	178		7.9%
2020	203		14.0%
U.S. Decennial Census

=== Racial and ethnic composition ===
Mission Woods city, Kansas – Racial and ethnic composition Note: the US Census treats Hispanic/Latino as an ethnic category. This table excludes Latinos from the racial categories and assigns them to a separate category. Hispanics/Latinos may be of any race.
Race / Ethnicity (NH = Non-Hispanic)	Pop 2000	Pop 2010	Pop 2020	% 2000	% 2010	% 2020
White alone (NH)	160	174	165	96.97%	97.75%	81.28%
Black or African American alone (NH)	3	1	6	1.82%	0.56%	2.96%
Native American or Alaska Native alone (NH)	0	0	0	0.00%	0.00%	0.00%
Asian alone (NH)	0	3	4	0.00%	1.69%	1.97%
Native Hawaiian or Pacific Islander alone (NH)	0	0	0	0.00%	0.00%	0.00%
Other race alone (NH)	2	0	0	1.21%	0.00%	0.00%
Mixed race or Multiracial (NH)	0	0	21	0.00%	0.00%	10.34%
Hispanic or Latino (any race)	0	0	7	0.00%	0.00%	3.45%
Total	165	178	203	100.00%	100.00%	100.00%

=== 2020 census ===
The 2020 United States census counted 203 people, 80 households, and 64 families in Mission Woods. The population density was 2,280.9 per square mile (880.7/km^{2}). There were 80 housing units at an average density of 898.9 per square mile (347.1/km^{2}). The racial makeup was 81.77% (166) white or European American (81.28% non-Hispanic white), 2.96% (6) black or African-American, 0.0% (0) Native American or Alaska Native, 1.97% (4) Asian, 0.0% (0) Pacific Islander or Native Hawaiian, 1.48% (3) from other races, and 11.82% (24) from two or more races. Hispanic or Latino of any race was 3.45% (7) of the population.

Of the 80 households, 40.0% had children under the age of 18; 70.0% were married couples living together; 16.2% had a female householder with no spouse or partner present. 12.5% of households consisted of individuals and 7.5% had someone living alone who was 65 years of age or older. The average household size was 2.6 and the average family size was 3.0. The percent of those with a bachelor's degree or higher was estimated to be 57.1% of the population.

23.2% of the population was under the age of 18, 6.4% from 18 to 24, 24.1% from 25 to 44, 18.7% from 45 to 64, and 27.6% who were 65 years of age or older. The median age was 43.4 years. For every 100 females, there were 111.5 males. For every 100 females ages 18 and older, there were 90.2 males.

The 2016–2020 5-year American Community Survey estimates show that the median household income was $250,000+ and the median family income was $250,000+. The median income for those above 16 years old was $121,250 (+/- $90,248). Approximately, 0.0% of families and 1.1% of the population were below the poverty line, including 0.0% of those under the age of 18 and 0.0% of those ages 65 or over.

=== 2010 census ===
As of the census of 2010, there were 178 people, 77 households, and 53 families living in the city. The population density was 1,780.0 inhabitants per square mile (687.3/km^{2}). There were 80 housing units at an average density of 800.0 per square mile (308.9/km^{2}). The racial makeup of the city was 97.8% White, 0.6% African American, and 1.7% Asian.

There were 77 households, of which 24.7% had children under the age of 18 living with them, 62.3% were married couples living together, 6.5% had a female householder with no husband present, and 31.2% were non-families. 26.0% of all households were made up of individuals, and 16.9% had someone living alone who was 65 years of age or older. The average household size was 2.31 and the average family size was 2.79.

The median age in the city was 54.5 years. 18.5% of residents were under the age of 18; 5.1% were between the ages of 18 and 24; 17.4% were from 25 to 44; 32.7% were from 45 to 64; and 26.4% were 65 years of age or older. The gender makeup of the city was 44.9% male and 55.1% female.

=== 2000 census ===
As of the census of 2000, there were 165 people, 77 households, and 51 families living in the city. The population density was 1,519.6 inhabitants per square mile (586.7/km^{2}). There were 78 housing units at an average density of 718.3 per square mile (277.3/km^{2}). The racial makeup of the city was 96.97% White, 1.82% African American, 1.21% from other races.

There were 77 households, out of which 16.9% had children under the age of 18 living with them, 62.3% were married couples living together, 2.6% had a female householder with no husband present, and 32.5% were non-families. 29.9% of all households were made up of individuals, and 16.9% had someone living alone who was 65 years of age or older. The average household size was 2.14 and the average family size was 2.65.

In the city, the population was spread out, with 18.8% under the age of 18, 1.8% from 18 to 24, 10.3% from 25 to 44, 42.4% from 45 to 64, and 26.7% who were 65 years of age or older. The median age was 54 years. For every 100 females, there were 94.1 males. For every 100 females age 18 and over, there were 88.7 males.

The median income for a household in the city was $106,885, and the median income for a family was $181,456. Males had a median income of $100,000 versus $60,625 for females. The per capita income for the city was $68,713. None of the population or families were below the poverty line.

== Transportation ==
=== Major highways ===
- US-56
- US-169

== Government ==
The Mission Woods government consists of a mayor and five council members. The council meets the first Tuesday of each month at 7PM.

== Libraries ==
The Johnson County Library serves residents of Mission Woods.
