= Wilburton, Kansas =

Unincorporated community in Morton County, Kansas

- Unincorporated community
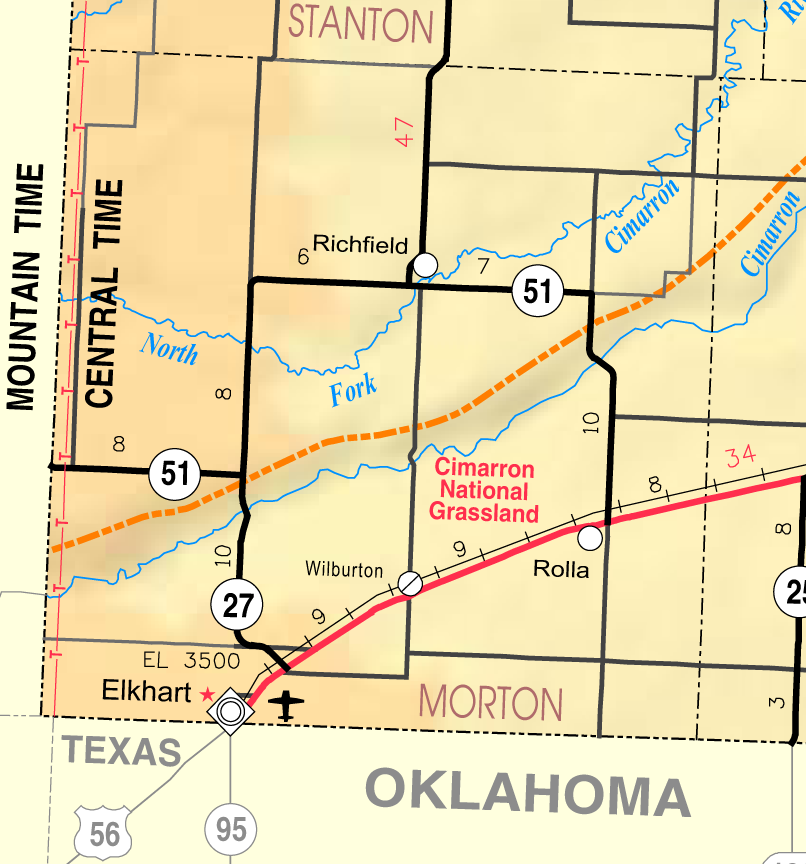
- KDOT map of Morton County (legend)

- Location within the state of Kansas Wilburton (the United States)
- Coordinates: 37°04′25″N 101°46′24″W
- Country: United States
- State: Kansas
- County: Morton
- Elevation: 3,435 ft (1,047 m)
- Time zone: UTC-6 (CST)
  - Summer (DST): UTC-5 (CDT)
- Area code: 620
- FIPS code: 20-79125
- GNIS ID: 484535

Wilburton is an unincorporated community in Morton County, Kansas, United States, located along U.S. Route 56 highway and the Cimarron Valley Railroad, 9 miles (14 km) northeast of Elkhart.

== History ==
Kansas Territory was organized in 1854 and Kansas became the 34th U.S. state in 1861. In 1886, Morton County was established, which included land for modern day Wilburton.

A post office was opened in Wilburton in 1913 and remained in operation until 1957. In the 1930s, the prosperity of the area was severely affected by its location within the Dust Bowl. This catastrophe intensified the economic impact of the Great Depression in the region, but until the mid-1950s, the town held its own with a population of 1,000–1,500, served by a grocery, dry goods store, gas station, repair garage, a restaurant, complete system of public schools and several churches. Additional businesses included several grain elevators and a lumber yard. There was also a railroad station. From 1960 onward, Wilburton deteriorated very rapidly. It was disincorporated by the start of that decade. Businesses and services were all gone by the 1970s and, by the opening of the 21st century, most homes were gone or abandoned also, leaving one house opening onto Route 56 and two farms on a side road across the railroad tracks. Some have even designated it a ghost town, although all unused buildings have been torn down or moved.
