= Wheeler, Kansas =

Unincorporated community in Cheyenne County, Kansas

- Unincorporated community
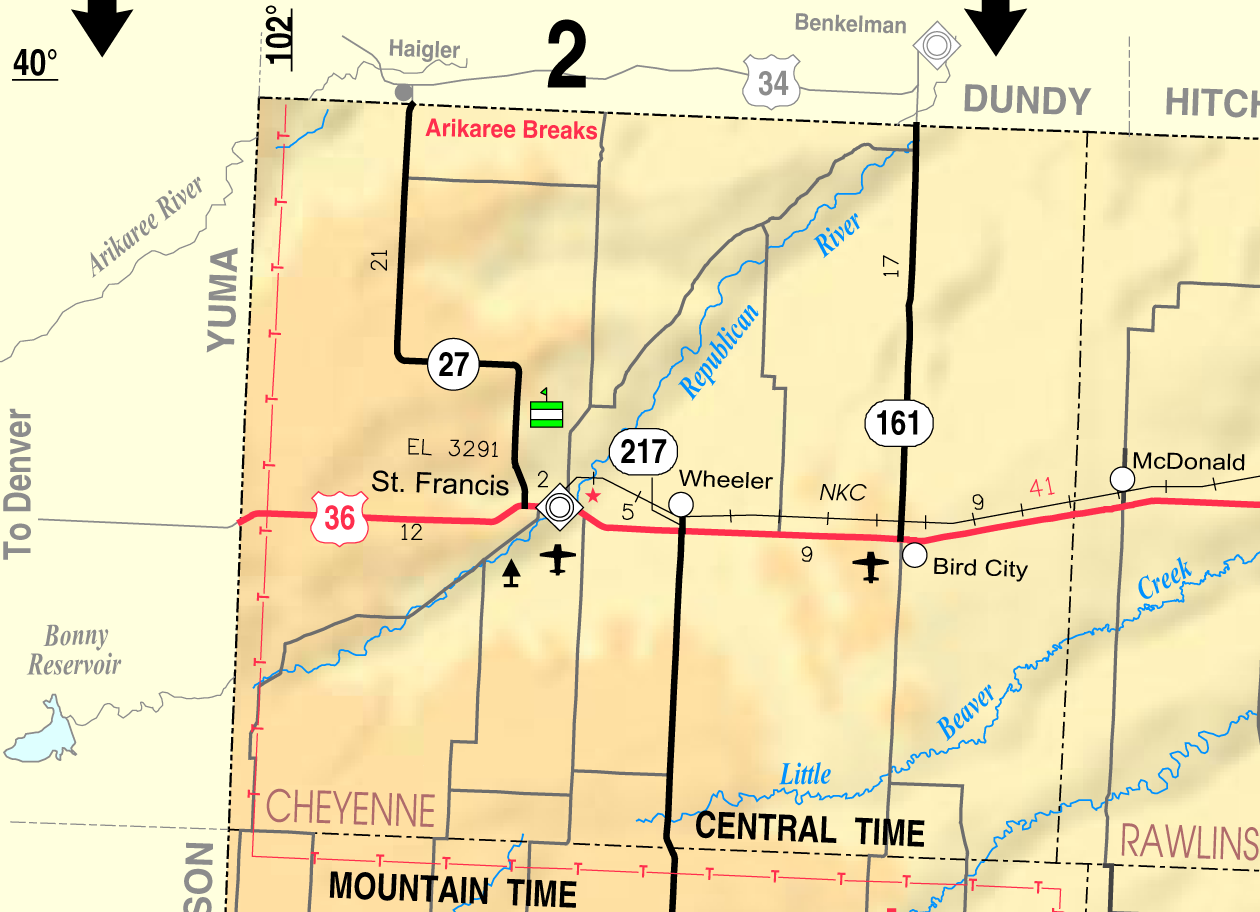
- KDOT map of Cheyenne County (legend)

- Location within Kansas Location within the United States
- Coordinates: 39°45′51″N 101°42′47″W
- Country: United States
- State: Kansas
- County: Cheyenne
- Elevation: 3,484 ft (1,062 m)
- Time zone: UTC-6 (CST)
  - Summer (DST): UTC-5 (CDT)
- Area code: 785
- FIPS code: 20-77750
- GNIS ID: 470978

Wheeler is an unincorporated community in Cheyenne County, Kansas, United States.

== History ==
A post office was opened in Wheeler in 1888, and remained in operation until it was discontinued in 1988.
