= K-27 (Kansas highway) =

State highway in Kansas, U.S.

K-27
- K-27 highlighted in red

Route information
- Maintained by KDOT
- Length: 226.241 mi (364.100 km)
- History: Designated K-25 in 1926; renumbered to K-27 in 1927

Major junctions
- South end: US-56 near Elkhart
- US-160 in Johnson City; US-50 / US-400 in Syracuse; K-96 in Tribune; US-40 in Sharon Springs; I-70 / US-24 in Goodland; US-36 near Saint Francis
- North end: N-27 at the Nebraska state line in Haigler, NE

Location
- Country: United States
- State: Kansas
- Counties: Morton, Stanton, Hamilton, Greeley, Wallace, Sherman, Cheyenne

Highway system
- Kansas State Highway System; Interstate; US; State; Spurs
← K-26	→ K-28

K-27 is an approximately 226-mile-long (364 km) north–south state highway that parallels Kansas' western border with Colorado. It is the westernmost north–south state highway in the state. It begins at U.S. Route 56 (US-56) in Elkhart near the Oklahoma state line and travels through the seven counties that border Colorado until reaching its northern terminus north of St. Francis, where it ends at the Nebraska state line (effectively becoming like-numbered Nebraska Highway 27). Along the way, it intersects several major highways, including US-160 in Johnson City, US-50 and US-400 in Syracuse, US-40 in Sharon Springs, Interstate 70 (I-70) and US-24 in Goodland, and US-36 in Wheeler. The section from US-40 north to Nebraska, is designated as the Land and Sky Scenic Byway. K-27 changes time zones twice, during its trek through Kansas, the only highway in the state to do so.

Before state highways were numbered in Kansas there were auto trails. The section of K-27 from Elkhart to the beginning of the overlap with K-51 was a part of the former Dallas–Canadian–Denver Highway. In Syracuse, the highway crosses the former National Old Trails Road, Old Santa Fe Trail and New Santa Fe Trail and Albert Pike Highway. In Tribune, K-27 crosses the former Kansas–Colorado Boulevard. In Sharon Springs the highway crosses the former Union Pacific Highway. Then further north in Goodland K-27 crosses the former Golden Belt, former Kansas White Way, former Blue Line, and former Pikes Peak Ocean to Ocean Highway. The route that K-27 follows was first designated as a state highway in 1926, as K-25. At that time it ran from the Elkhart, north to the Nebraska border. By 1927, it was renumbered to K-27. In 1955, K-27 was extended from Elkhart, south to the Oklahoma border. Then in 2004, it was realigned to intersect US-56 northeast of Elkhart.

== Route description ==
K-27 changes time zones twice, during its trek through Kansas, the only highway in the state to do so. From the southern terminus, Central Standard Time is observed in Morton and Stanton counties, but the time zone changes to Mountain Standard Time when the highway crosses from Stanton into Hamilton County. Hamilton and the next three counties to the north (Greeley, Wallace, and Sherman) observe Mountain time, but clocks revert to Central Time at the Sherman County-Cheyenne County line.

The Kansas Department of Transportation (KDOT) tracks the traffic levels on its highways, and in 2018, they determined that on average the traffic varied from 410 vehicles per day just north of the southern overlap with K-51 to 4,410 vehicles per day in the city of Goodland. The only section of K-27 included in the National Highway System is its overlap with US-50 and US-400. The National Highway System is a system of highways important to the nation's defense, economy, and mobility. K-27 also connects to the National Highway System at its junction with I-70 and US-24.

=== Morton and Stanton counties ===
K-27 begins at US-56 northeast of Elkhart, crosses the Cimarron Valley Railroad, and then curves to the west. After about .5 miles (0.80 km) the road curves to the north then crosses Happy Ditch about 1.2 miles (1.9 km) later. The highway continues north through flat rural farmlands for roughly 4.9 miles (7.9 km) then crosses the Cimarron River. From here the roadway continues another 1.4 miles (2.3 km), where it begins an overlap with K-51, the only overlap with another state highway. The two routes continue north through flat farmlands for approximately 3.45 miles (5.55 km) then cross an unnamed creek. K-27 and K-51 advance north for about two miles (3.2 km) then crosses North Fork Cimarron River. About 2.4 miles (3.9 km) past the river the highway curves east at Road 9. The roadway continues through farmlands for roughly 5.7 miles (9.2 km) then begins to border the city of Richfield as South Boulevard.

About 0.5 miles (0.80 km) later K-27 turns north onto Main Street, as K-51 continues east. K-27 then exits the city and passes through flat farmlands for about 2.3 miles (3.7 km) and crosses an unnamed creek. The highway continues on for about five miles (8.0 km) then curves northeast and enters into Stanton County. K-27 enters the county and curves north then continues about 7.45 miles (11.99 km) and crosses Sand Arroyo Creek. From here the highway passes through flat rural farmlands for roughly 4.25 miles (6.84 km), crosses a Cimmaron Valley Railroad, then is joined by US-160. K-27 and US-160 continue north parallel to the western Johnson City line for about one mile (1.6 km), then US-160 turns east. K-27 continues north from here for approximately 3.5 miles (5.6 km) then crosses Bear Creek. The highway passes through more flat farmlands for 7.5 miles (12.1 km) then enters into Hamilton County.

=== Hamilton and Greeley counties ===
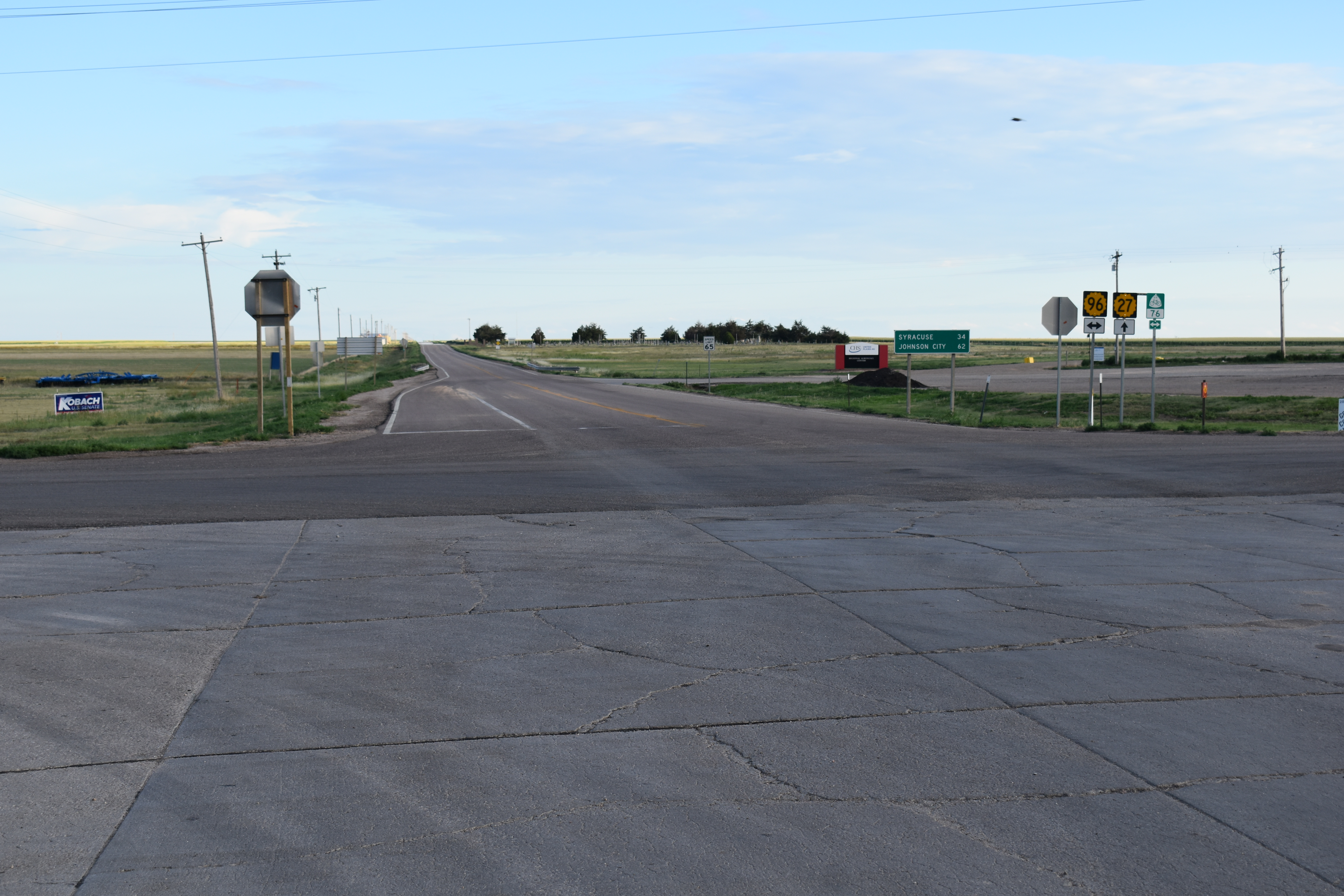
K-27 southbound at K-96

Just inside the county, K-27 crosses Little Bear Creek, and continues north. The highway passes through flat farmland and grassland for about 15.8 miles (25.4 km) then crosses the Arkansas River. K-27 then enters the city of Syracuse as Main Street. A few blocks later the road has an at-grade crossing with a BNSF Railway track and then intersects US-50 and US-400, known as A Avenue. At this point K-27 turns west and begins to overlap US-50 and US-400. At the western city line, K-27 turns north onto McDow Street as US-50 and US-400 continue west. K-27 continues north through flat rural farmlands for about 3.15 miles (5.07 km) then crosses Syracuse Creek. The highway advances north another 5.85 miles (9.41 km) and crosses Sand Creek. The road continues north through flat land for approximately 9.1 miles (14.6 km) and then crosses Mattox Draw. The highway then curves northeast and enters into Greeley County. As the roadway enters the county, it curves back north and travels about 14 miles (23 km) and intersects K-96 at the southern city limits of Tribune. The highway crosses the Kansas and Oklahoma Railroad as it continues north through the city. As K-27 leaves Tribune it crosses White Woman Creek and continues north. The highway passes through flat rural farmland for approximately 13.45 miles (21.65 km) then curves northeast and crosses South Ladder Creek. The road then curves north and enters into Wallace County.

=== Wallace County ===
As the road enters the county, it soon crosses Middle Ladder Creek. About four miles (6.4 km) north from here, the road crosses Ladder Creek. The highway continues through flat rural farmland for around 3.4 miles (5.5 km) then crosses Rose Creek. K-27 then crosses North Fork Rose Creek and curves northwest. The highway curves back north and continues though flat lands for around 2.75 miles (4.43 km) then enters Sharon Springs as Main Street. Within the city, the road crosses Eagletail Creek and a Union Pacific Railway before intersecting US-40. K-27 turns east and follows US-40 for a brief distance, then turns back north. Here the Land and Sky Scenic Byway begins and follows K-27. The highway exits the city and after about 2.3 miles (3.7 km) crosses the Smoky Hill River. From here, the roadway continues for a short distance, then shifts 0.5 miles (0.80 km) to the east through an s-curve. K-27 proceeds north through farmland for around 3.25 miles (5.23 km) then crosses Pond Creek. The highway continues for 3.9 miles (6.3 km) then crosses South Fork Lake Creek. Roughly 2.1 miles (3.4 km) north from here, K-27 curves northeast and crosses North Fork Lake Creek. The road curves north and passes through flat farmland for approximately 1.3 miles (2.1 km) then crosses into Sherman County.

=== Sherman and Cheyenne counties ===
K-27 continues for 2.7 miles (4.3 km) then curves slightly northeast and crosses the North Fork Smoky Hill River. The highway curves northwest for a slight distance then curves and resumes its northern course. The roadway crosses Wild Horse Draw then advances northward for roughly 6.8 miles (10.9 km) and enters Goodland as Commerce Road. The highway soon reaches I-70 and US-24 at a diamond interchange. K-27 begins to overlap US-24 Business as it continues north. After 0.5 miles (0.80 km), US-24 Business leaves to the east, as K-27 continues north out of the city limits. The highway crosses a Kyle Railroad track and continues along the west side of Goodland. The highway then curves northeast and begins to follow Middle Fork Sappa Creek. After about 0.9 miles (1.4 km) K-27 crosses Middle Fork Horse Draw then curves north. The highway passes through flat rural farmland for 3.1 miles (5.0 km) and crosses South Beaver Creek. The road continues for 1.3 miles (2.1 km) then crosses Middle Beaver Creek. K-27 advances north through flat farmlands for roughly 7.9 miles (12.7 km) then curves northwest and enters into Cheyenne County.

As the highway enters the county, it curves northward again, and after 0.9 miles (1.4 km) crosses Little Beaver Creek. The road continues through rural farmland for around 11.7 miles (18.8 km) then intersects US-36 and the southern terminus of former K-217. At this point K-27 turns west and begins to overlap US-36. The two routes cross Sand Creek 2.1 miles (3.4 km) later then curve northwest. K-27 and US-36 then enter St. Francis as they curve west. The highway exits the city and soon crosses the South Fork Republican River. K-27 then turns north as US-36 continues west toward Colorado. K-27 advances north through rolling hills for about 0.6 miles (0.97 km) then curves northwest and crosses Cherry Creek .8 miles (1.3 km) later. The highway then curves north and passes through a combination of rolling hills and flat farmland for 2.7 miles (4.3 km) then crosses Fish Creek. K-27 then curves west and continues for roughly five miles (8.0 km) then curves back north. The highway passes through a mixture of flat farmlands transitioning to small rolling hills for about 3.8 miles (6.1 km) and crosses Hackberry Creek. The road advances north through farmlands for around 3.4 miles (5.5 km) then the landscape transitions to rolling hills. K-27 advances north for 2.8 miles (4.5 km) and then enters into Nebraska, where it continues as Nebraska Highway 27.

== History ==
=== Early roads ===
Before state highways were numbered in Kansas there were auto trails, which were an informal network of marked routes that existed in the United States and Canada in the early part of the 20th century. The section of K-27 from Elkhart to the beginning of the overlap with K-51 was a part of the former Dallas–Canadian–Denver Highway, which went from Boulder, Colorado to Galveston, Texas. In Syracuse, the highway crosses the former National Old Trails Road, Old Santa Fe Trail and New Santa Fe Trail as well as the Albert Pike Highway, which ran from Colorado Springs, Colorado. to Hot Springs, Arkansas. In Tribune, K-27 crosses the former Kansas–Colorado Boulevard. In Sharon Springs the highway crosses the former Union Pacific Highway. Then further north in Goodland K-27 crosses the former Golden Belt, which began in Denver and went east to Kansas City; the former Kansas White Way, which went from Colorado Springs, Colorado, to St. Joseph, Missouri; former Blue Line, which went from Limon, Colorado to Junction City, Kansas; former Roosevelt National Highway; and former Pikes Peak Ocean to Ocean Highway, which was formed in 1912, and went from New York City to Los Angeles.

=== Establishment ===
K-25 sign

The route that K-27 follows was first designated as a state highway in 1926, as K-25. At that time it ran from the Oklahoma state line, north then east to Richfield. It then turned north and intersected K-46 then US-50 shortly after in Syracuse. It then continued north to K-96 in Tribune, then reached US-340 in Sharon Springs. It continued north, intersecting US-40 in Goodland, before reaching K-2 by Wheeler. K-2 and K-25 then overlapped from Wheeler to St Francis. In St Francis the two routes split, and K-25 headed north and soon crossed into Nebraska. The county engineer of Morton County ordered signs in January 1926. By 1927, the highway was renumbered as K-27. Also, US-340 was renumbered to US-40S and US-40 was renumbered to US-40N.

=== Realignments ===
In a July 23, 1935 resolution, the alignment of K-27 was straightened to eliminate sharp curves, within Sharon Springs. On June 6, 1936, it was approved to slightly realign K-27 in Stanton in Stanton County. In a January 26, 1937 state highway commission meeting, it was approved to realign K-27 where it crosses the Smoky Hill River, in order to eliminate a bad drainage condition caused by several small branches converging with the main river. Between February 1937 and January 1938, US-270 was extended into Kansas, and overlapped K-27 from Johnson north to US-50 in Syracuse, where it terminated. KDOT requested that US-270 be extended north along K-27 to I-70 south of Goodland. This request was denied by the American Association of State Highway Officials in an October 14, 1967 meeting. In a November 14, 1980 AASHTO meeting, a request by KDOT was approved to truncate US-270 to its current terminus in Liberal. Then in a May 18, 1981 state highway commission meeting, it was approved by the state to truncate US-270 to Liberal and the designation was removed from K-27. In a March 20, 1937 resolution, the intersection with K-96 in tribune was reconstructed. On March 18, 1940, it was approved to slightly realign K-27 within Richfield and Stanton in Morton County, to eliminate several sharp curves. Before 1950, K-27 zigzagged from St. Francis northwestward. Then in an August 10, 1950 resolution, the overlap with US-36 was extended 1.5 miles (2.4 km) west from St Francis then turned north for about six miles (9.7 km) then turned west, which eliminated 13 sharp curves. On September 27, 1950, the state highway commission approved to realign K-27 in Goodland. Then in an October 14, 1953 resolution, the latter K-27 realignment was moved further northward to run along 8th Street in Goodland. This new alignment was completed by 1954. Then by 1970, it was realigned in Goodland again to its modern-day alignment.

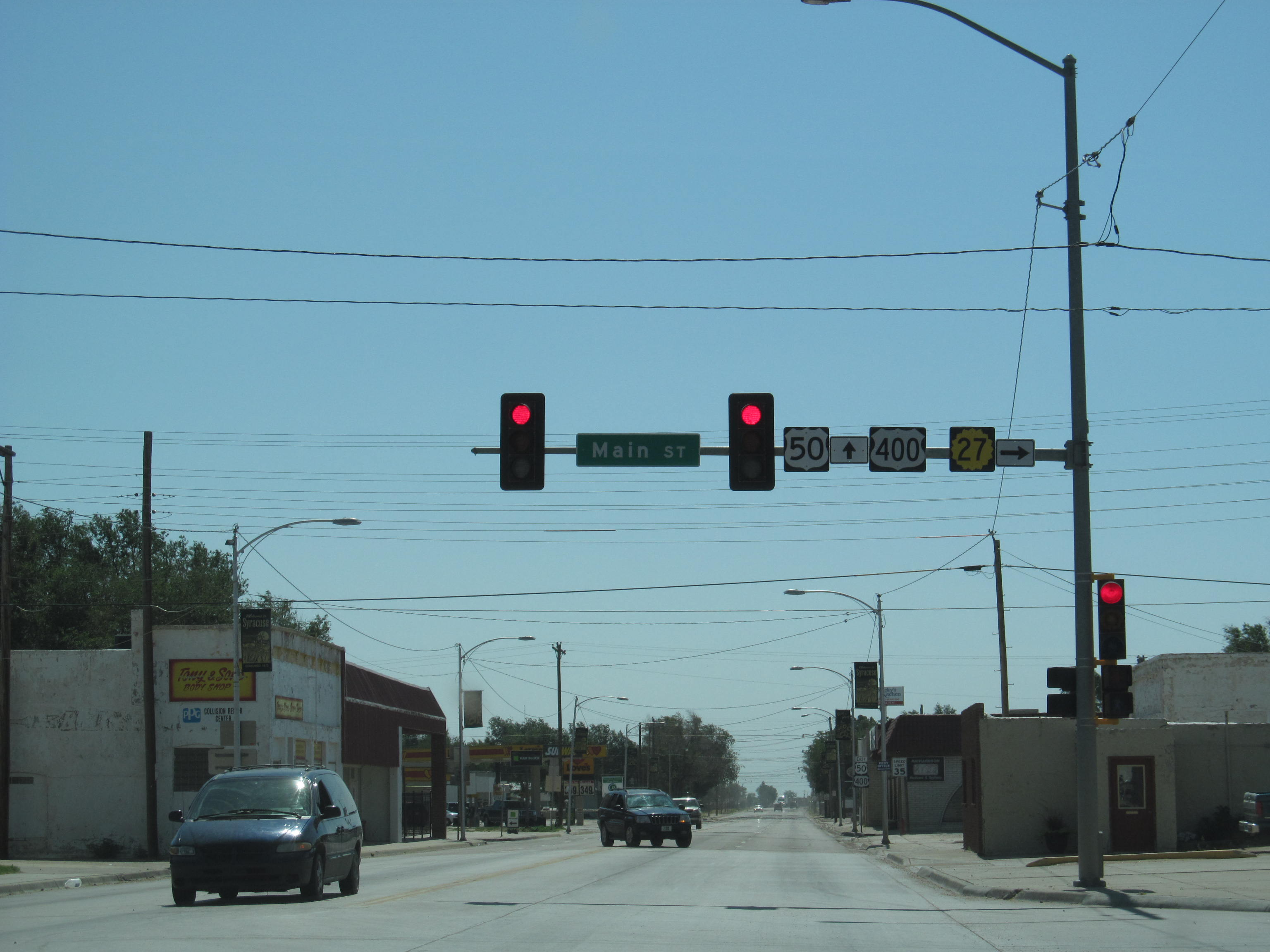
K-27 at south end of overlap with US-50 and US-400 in Syracuse

On June 2, 1954, it was approved to slightly straighten the alignment of K-27, slightly south of the Nebraska border, to eliminate several sharp curves. In an April 27, 1955 resolution, K-27 was extended from Elkart, 0.33 miles (0.53 km) south to the Oklahoma border, where it continued as Oklahoma Highway 95.

K-127
- Location: Elkhart
- Length: 0.276 mi (444 m)
- Existed: November 14, 1956–c. 1959

In a November 14, 1956 resolution, a 0.276-mile-long (0.444 km) connector road was built from K-27 east to US-56, and designated as K-127. K-127 was decommissioned by 1959, as the city of Elkhart had annexed all the land around the highway, which is against Kansas law.

In a June 7, 1966 State Highway Commission meeting, the interchange with I-70 was designated, K-27 Spur was designated, and US-24 was realigned to overlap the new I-70. Then in an April 1, 1981 resolution, K-27 Spur was renumbered to US-24 Business in Goodland. On a May 3, 1996, the state approved to extend US-400 west, and was added to the overlap with US-50 in Syracuse. Before 2004, K-27 travelled through the west side of Elkhart to the Oklahoma border. On May 21, 2004, KDOT approved to realign K-27 north of Elkhart. The new 1.902-mile-long (3.061 km) realignment intersected US-56 northeast of Elkhart. In a December 22, 2015 resolution, the highway was realigned south of Sharon Springs, where it crossed Rose Creek and North Fork Rose Creek.

== Major intersections ==
County	Location	mi	km	Destinations	Notes
Morton	Elkhart	0.000	0.000	US-56 – Hugoton, Boise City, OK	Southern terminus
Morton	Westola Township	9.413	15.149	K-51 west	Southern end of K-51 conccurrency
Morton	Richfield	23.708	38.154	K-51 east – Hugoton	Northern end of K-51 overlap
Stanton	Johnson City	45.207	72.754	US-160 west – Manter	Southern end of US-160 overlap
Stanton	Johnson City	46.214	74.374	US-160 east – Ulysses	Northern end of US-160 overlap
Hamilton	Syracuse	74.087	119.231	US-50 / US-400 east – Lakin	Southern end of US-50/US-400 overlap
Hamilton	Syracuse	74.617	120.084	US-50 / US-400 west – Lamar, CO	Northern end of US-50/US-400 overlap
Greeley	Tribune	108.181	174.100	K-96 – Leoti, Eads, CO	
Wallace	Sharon Springs	138.426	222.775	US-40 west – Cheyenne Wells, CO	Southern end of US-40 overlap
Wallace	Sharon Springs	138.526	222.936	US-40 east – Oakley	Northern end of US-40 overlap
Sherman	Goodland	168.300	270.853	I-70 / US-24 – Denver, Hays US 24 Bus. begins	Southern end of US-24 Bus. concurrency; western terminus of US-24 Bus.; I-70 exit 17; diamond interchange
Sherman	Goodland	168.883	271.791	US 24 Bus. east / Old US-24 west	Northern end of US-24 Bus. concurrency; former routing of US-24
Cheyenne	Wheeler	198.454	319.381	US-36 east – Atwood	Southern end of US-36 overlap
Cheyenne	Wano Township	205.135	330.133	US-36 west – Denver	Northern end of US-36 overlap
Cheyenne	Haigler	226.241	364.100	N-27 north – Haigler	Continuation into Nebraska
1.000 mi = 1.609 km; 1.000 km = 0.621 mi: Concurrency terminus

== K-27 Spur ==
K-27 Spur
- Location: Near Goodland
- Length: 2.902 mi (4.670 km)
- Existed: June 7, 1966–April 1, 1981

K-27 Spur was a 2.902-mile-long (4.670 km) connection between K-27 and I-70 / US 24 in Goodland. In a June 7, 1966 resolution, when US-24 was moved onto I-70, and K-27 Spur was designated along the old alignment of US-24. K-27 Spur was decommissioned in an April 1, 1981 resolution, and became a part of US-24 Business.

=== Major junctions ===
The entire route was in Goodland, Sherman County.

mi	km	Destinations	Notes
0.000	0.000	K-27	Western terminus
2.902	4.670	I-70 / US-24	Eastern terminus
1.000 mi = 1.609 km; 1.000 km = 0.621 mi

== See also ==
- List of state highways in Kansas
- List of state highway spurs in Kansas
- U.S. Route 385 in Colorado, parallels the state line on the Colorado side
- Arikaree Breaks, landforms bisected by K-27 in northwest Kansas
