= K-51 (Kansas highway) =

State highway in Kansas, U.S.

K-51
- K-51 highlighted in red

Route information
- Maintained by KDOT
- Length: 79.095 mi (127.291 km)
- History: Established in 1926; became K-12 c. 1930; re-established as K-51 on January 7, 1937

Major junctions
- West end: CR M at the Colorado state line at Westola Township
- US-56 from Rolla to Hugoton
- East end: US-83 north of Liberal

Location
- Country: United States
- State: Kansas
- Counties: Morton, Stevens, Seward

Highway system
- Kansas State Highway System; Interstate; US; State; Spurs
← US-50	→ K-52

K-51 is an approximately 79-mile-long (127 km) east–west state highway in the southwestern part of the U.S. state of Kansas. K-51 begins at the Colorado state line as a continuation of County Road M and travels eastward through portions of Morton, Stevens, and Seward counties before ending at U.S. Route 83 (US-83) north of Liberal. Along the way, it runs concurrently with US-56 from Rolla to Hugoton. Although K-51 travels through mostly rural farmlands, it does pass through the cities of Richfield, Rolla and Hugoton. The highway is also a two-lane road most of its length with the exception of short sections within Rolla and Hugoton, where it is four lanes.

Before state highways were numbered in Kansas there were auto trails. The eastern terminus (US-83) was part of the Atlantic and Pacific Highway. K-51 was first designated as a state highway in 1926, and at that time started as a continuation of Colorado Highway 51 and went east to K-25 (current K-27). Then by 1927, it ran from K-12 north of Rolla to K-27 in Richfield. Between 1930 and 1931, K-51 was replaced with an extension of K-12. Then on January 1, 1937, K-51 was re-established from the Colorado border east to K-27. Then by 1937, K-51 was extended further east to US-83, its modern-day routing. K-51 originally overlapped US-270, then in a May 18, 1981 resolution, the US-270 designation was removed.

== Route description ==
K-51's western terminus is at the Colorado state line, acting as a continuation of County Road M (CR M). The highway travels due east through flat, rural farmlands for 7.9 miles (12.7 km) then intersects K-27. At this point K-51 turns north and begins to overlap K-27. The highway continues north for 3.5 miles (5.6 km) then crosses an unnamed creek. K-27/K-51 continues north through more farmlands for another two miles (3.2 km) then crosses North Fork Cimarron River. K-27/K-51 continues north for roughly 2.6 miles (4.2 km) then curves east at Road 9 and U Road. The highway continues east through flat farmlands for about six miles (9.7 km) and enters Richfield as South Boulevard. About 0.5 miles (800 m) into the city K-27 turns north onto Main Street, as K-51 continues eastward. K-51 then crosses North Fork Cimarron River again as it exits the city. The highway continues east through rural farmlands for 7.1 miles (11.4 km) then curves south at Road 23 and U Road. It continues south for about 2.5 miles (4.0 km), where it curves southeast and crosses the Cimarron River. The highway then curves back south and after 1.8 miles (2.9 km) intersects P Boulevard. From here it continues south for another 4.3 miles (6.9 km) then enters Rolla.

Inside the city, K-51 has an at-grade crossing with a Cimarron Valley Railroad track then intersects US-56. K-51 turns east onto US-56 and then the highway exits the city. US-56/K-51 continues for about four miles (6.4 km), parallel to the railroad, then crosses into Stevens County. The highway continues into the county for 4.1 miles (6.6 km) through farmlands then intersects K-25, which travels south into Oklahoma. From here, US-56/K-25/K-51 continues northeast for 4.6 miles (7.4 km) then curves east. The highway then passes a group of houses then enters Hugoton as 11th Street and transitions from two lanes to four lanes. The highway continues through the city for 0.5 miles (800 m) then US-56/K-25 turns north onto Main Street. K-51 continues east and exits the city after about 0.5 miles (800 m), becoming a two-lane road again. The highway continues through rural farmlands for 6.9 miles (11.1 km) then intersects Road 20, which travels north to Moscow. From here, K-51 continues for about six miles (9.7 km) and passes through Woods. The highway continues another two miles (3.2 km) then enters into Seward County. About one mile (1.6 km) into the county, K-51 intersects Marteney Road and Ww Road. From here, the highway continues for seven miles (11 km) through more flat rural farmlands then reaches its eastern terminus at US-83 north of Liberal.

The Kansas Department of Transportation (KDOT) tracks the traffic levels on its highways, and in 2018, they determined that on average the traffic varied from 110 vehicles per day near the western terminus to 2,320 vehicles per day just west of the city of Hugoton. K-51 is not included in the National Highway System, a system of highways important to the nation's defense, economy, and mobility. K-51 does connect to the National Highway System at its junction with US-83.

== History ==
=== Early roads ===
Before state highways were numbered in Kansas there were auto trails, which were an informal network of marked routes that existed in the United States and Canada in the early part of the 20th century. The eastern terminus of K-51 (US-83) was part of the Atlantic and Pacific Highway. It connected Los Angeles on the Pacific Ocean with New York City on the Atlantic Ocean.

=== Establishment and realignments ===
K-12
- Existed: 1927–c. 1937

K-51 was first designated as a state highway in 1926, and at that time started as a continuation of Colorado Highway 51 and went east to K-25 (current K-27). Then by 1927, K-25 was renumbered as K-27 and K-51 was extended along K-27 to Richfield then south to K-12 north of Rolla. Between 1930 and 1931, K-51 was replaced with an extension of K-12. In a January 1, 1937 resolution, it was approved to re-established K-51 from the Colorado border east to K-27. Then by February 1937, K-51 was extended east and replaced the former K-12, from K-27 in Richfield to US-83 by Liberal. K-12 signs were replaced with K-51 signs by April 1937. In a January 4, 1939 resolution, K-51 was to be realigned where it crosses the Cimarron River to eliminate two sharp curves. Between February 1937 and January 1938, US-270 was extended into Kansas, and overlapped K-51 from the eastern end of the overlap with K-25 to US-83. In a decision on November 14, 1980, the American Association of State Highway and Transportation Officials approved a request by KDOT to truncate US-270 to its current terminus in Liberal. Then in a decision on May 18, 1981, US-270 was truncated to its current terminus in Liberal and the designation was removed from K-51.

The section of K-51 from Rolla northeast to Hugoton, originally overlapped K-45. In the early 1950s, towns along the K-45 corridor, connecting Ellsworth, Kansas to the Oklahoma state line at Elkhart, formed the Mid-Continent Diagonal Highway Association to push for a new highway from Springer, New Mexico, (on US-85) northeast across the Oklahoma Panhandle, along K-45, and continuing to Manitowoc, Wisconsin, on Lake Michigan. By mid-1954, it was being promoted as US-55 between the Great Lakes and the Southwestern United States. The first submissions to the American Association of State Highway Officials (AASHO) to establish the route were made in 1954. The first route considered in northeast Kansas was via US-40 from Ellsworth to Topeka and K-4 and US-59 via Atchison to St. Joseph, Missouri. A revised route adopted in March 1955, due to AASHO objections to the original route, which traveled concurrently with other U.S. Highways for over half of its length, followed K-14, K-18, US-24, K-63, K-16, and US-59 via Lincoln and Manhattan. In July, the US-50N Association proposed a plan that would have eliminated US-50N by routing US-55 along most of its length, from Larned east to Baldwin Junction, and then along US 59 to Lawrence and K-10 to Kansas City; towns on US-50N west of Larned, which would have been bypassed, led a successful fight against this. However, in September of that year, the Kansas Highway Commission accepted that plan, taking US-55 east to Kansas City. On June 27, 1956, the AASHO Route Numbering Committee considered this refined plan for US-55, between Springer, New Mexico and Kansas City, Missouri, with a short US-155 along the remaining portion of US-50N from Larned west to Garden City. The committee approved the request, but since the proposed route was more east–west than north–south, it changed it to an even number (US-56) and the spur to US-156. At this time, K-45 became known as US-56.

== Major intersections ==
County	Location	mi	km	Destinations	Notes
Morton	Westola Township	0.000	0.000	CR M west	Continuation into Colorado
Morton	Westola Township	7.871	12.667	K-27 south – Elkhart	Western end of K-27 concurrency
Morton	Richfield	22.265	35.832	K-27 north (Main Street) – Johnson City	Eastern end of K-27 concurrency
Morton	Rolla	39.746	63.965	US-56 west (1st Avenue) – Elkhart	Western end of US-56 concurrency
Stevens	West Center Township	47.994	77.239	K-25 south – Guymon OK	Western end of K-25 concurrency
Stevens	Hugoton	56.211	90.463	US-56 east / K-25 north (Main Street) – Satanta, Ulysses	Eastern end of US-56 and K-25 concurrencies
Seward	Liberal Township	79.095	127.291	US-83 (Road I) – Sublette, Liberal	Eastern terminus; road continues as Road 13 (unpaved)
1.000 mi = 1.609 km; 1.000 km = 0.621 mi: Concurrency terminus
