= North Fork Cimarron River =

River in the United States

Physical characteristics
- Source
  - coordinates: 37°08′58″N 102°39′10″W
- Mouth
  - location: Confluence with Cimarron
  - coordinates: 37°25′14″N 101°07′16″W
  - elevation: 2,841 ft (866 m)

Basin features
- Progression: Cimarron—Arkansas—Mississippi

North Fork Cimarron River is a 169-mile-long (272 km) tributary of the Cimarron River that flows from a source in Comanche National Grassland in Baca County, Colorado. It joins the Cimarron River west of Satanta in Haskell County, Kansas.

== See also ==
- List of rivers of Colorado
- List of rivers of Kansas
