= Rolla, Kansas =

City in Morton County, Kansas

- City
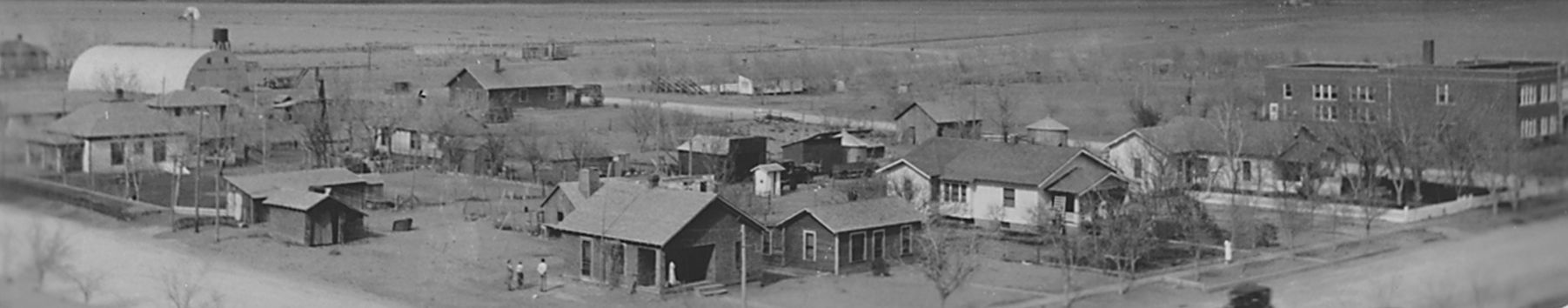
- Panorama of Rolla (1935)

- Location within Morton County and Kansas

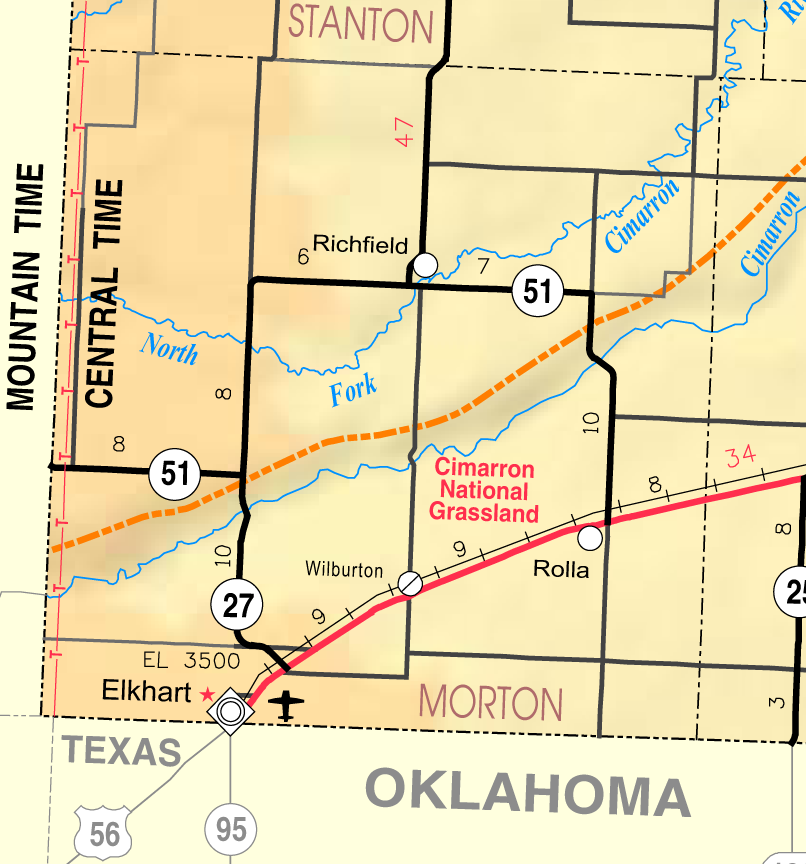
- KDOT map of Morton County (legend)
- Coordinates: 37°07′06″N 101°37′57″W
- Country: United States
- State: Kansas
- County: Morton
- Founded: 1900s
- Platted: 1913
- Incorporated: 1921
- Named for: Rollie Williamson

Area
  - Total: 0.37 sq mi (0.97 km^{2})
  - Land: 0.37 sq mi (0.97 km^{2})
  - Water: 0 sq mi (0.00 km^{2})
- Elevation: 3,327 ft (1,014 m)

Population (2020)
  - Total: 384
  - Density: 1,000/sq mi (400/km^{2})
- Time zone: UTC-6 (CST)
  - Summer (DST): UTC-5 (CDT)
- ZIP Code: 67954
- Area code: 620
- FIPS code: 20-60900
- GNIS ID: 2396419
- Website: City website

Rolla is a city in Morton County, Kansas, United States. As of the 2020 census, the population of the city was 384.

== History ==
=== Early history ===
For many millennia, the Great Plains of North America was inhabited by nomadic Native Americans. From the 16th century to 18th century, the Kingdom of France claimed ownership of large parts of North America. In 1762, after the French and Indian War, France secretly ceded New France to Spain, per the Treaty of Fontainebleau.

=== 19th century ===
In 1802, Spain returned most of the land to France, but keeping title to about 7,500 square miles. In 1803, most of the land for modern day Kansas was acquired by the United States from France as part of the 828,000 square mile Louisiana Purchase for 2.83 cents per acre. In 1848, after the Mexican–American War, the Treaty of Guadalupe Hidalgo with Spain brought into the United States all or part of land for ten future states, including southwest Kansas.

In 1854, the Kansas Territory was organized, then in 1861 Kansas became the 34th U.S. state. In 1886, Morton County was established, which included the land for modern day Rolla.

=== 20th century ===
The first post office at Rolla was established in 1907. Rolla was laid out in 1913. Rolla is named after Rollie Ray Williamson, who came to Western Kansas in 1907 in a covered wagon with his mother and uncle to meet his father, who had homesteaded in the area.

In the 1930s, the prosperity of the area was severely affected by its location within the Dust Bowl. This catastrophe intensified the economic impact of the Great Depression in the region.

== Geography ==
According to the United States Census Bureau, the city has a total area of 0.37 square miles (0.96 km^{2}), all land.

=== Climate ===
According to the Köppen Climate Classification system, Rolla has a semi-arid climate, abbreviated "BSk" on climate maps.

== Demographics ==
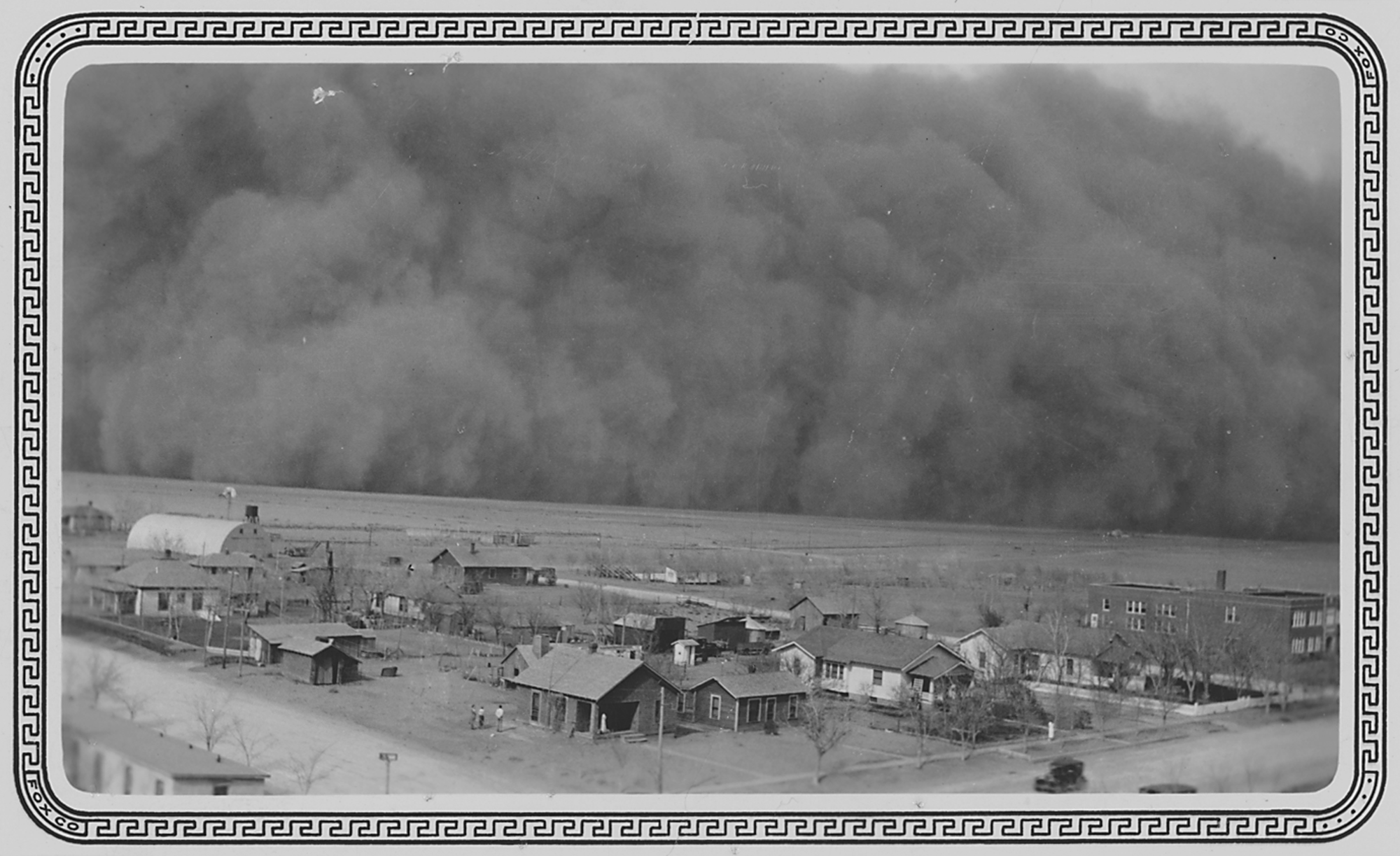
Dust storm in Rolla on May 6, 1935

Historical population
Census	Pop.	Note	%±
1930	437		—
1940	284		−35.0%
1950	433		52.5%
1960	464		7.2%
1970	400		−13.8%
1980	417		4.3%
1990	387		−7.2%
2000	482		24.5%
2010	442		−8.3%
2020	384		−13.1%
U.S. Decennial Census

=== 2010 census ===
As of the census of 2010, there were 442 people, 166 households, and 124 families residing in the city. The population density was 1,194.6 inhabitants per square mile (461.2/km^{2}). There were 190 housing units at an average density of 513.5 per square mile (198.3/km^{2}). The racial makeup of the city was 83.3% White, 1.1% African American, 1.6% Native American, 0.5% Asian, 0.9% Pacific Islander, 9.5% from other races, and 3.2% from two or more races. Hispanic or Latino of any race were 24.2% of the population.

There were 166 households, of which 39.2% had children under the age of 18 living with them, 57.2% were married couples living together, 11.4% had a female householder with no husband present, 6.0% had a male householder with no wife present, and 25.3% were non-families. 22.9% of all households were made up of individuals, and 10.8% had someone living alone who was 65 years of age or older. The average household size was 2.66 and the average family size was 3.11.

The median age in the city was 35.1 years. 30.8% of residents were under the age of 18; 8.2% were between the ages of 18 and 24; 24.4% were from 25 to 44; 26.3% were from 45 to 64; and 10.4% were 65 years of age or older. The gender makeup of the city was 50.7% male and 49.3% female.

=== 2000 census ===
As of the census of 2000, there were 482 people, 165 households, and 121 families residing in the city. The population density was 1,411.1 inhabitants per square mile (544.8/km^{2}). There were 199 housing units at an average density of 582.6 per square mile (224.9/km^{2}). The racial makeup of the city was 81.95% White, 1.87% Native American, 0.41% Asian, 12.45% from other races, and 3.32% from two or more races. Hispanic or Latino of any race were 22.41% of the population.

There were 165 households, out of which 41.8% had children under the age of 18 living with them, 63.6% were married couples living together, 6.1% had a female householder with no husband present, and 26.1% were non-families. 24.2% of all households were made up of individuals, and 10.9% had someone living alone who was 65 years of age or older. The average household size was 2.92 and the average family size was 3.54.

In the city, the population was spread out, with 35.7% under the age of 18, 7.1% from 18 to 24, 28.4% from 25 to 44, 17.6% from 45 to 64, and 11.2% who were 65 years of age or older. The median age was 33 years. For every 100 females, there were 93.6 males. For every 100 females age 18 and over, there were 105.3 males.

The median income for a household in the city was $38,500, and the median income for a family was $43,750. Males had a median income of $24,886 versus $14,583 for females. The per capita income for the city was $13,211. About 8.8% of families and 10.8% of the population were below the poverty line, including 11.2% of those under age 18 and 5.7% of those age 65 or over.

== Education ==
The community is served by Rolla USD 217 public school district. The Rolla High School mascot is Pirates.

The Rolla Pirates won the Kansas State High School Class BB state basketball tournament in 1958, the 8-Man football championship in 1973 and the 8-Man DII football championship in 1996.
