= Morton County, Kansas =

County in Kansas, United States

- County
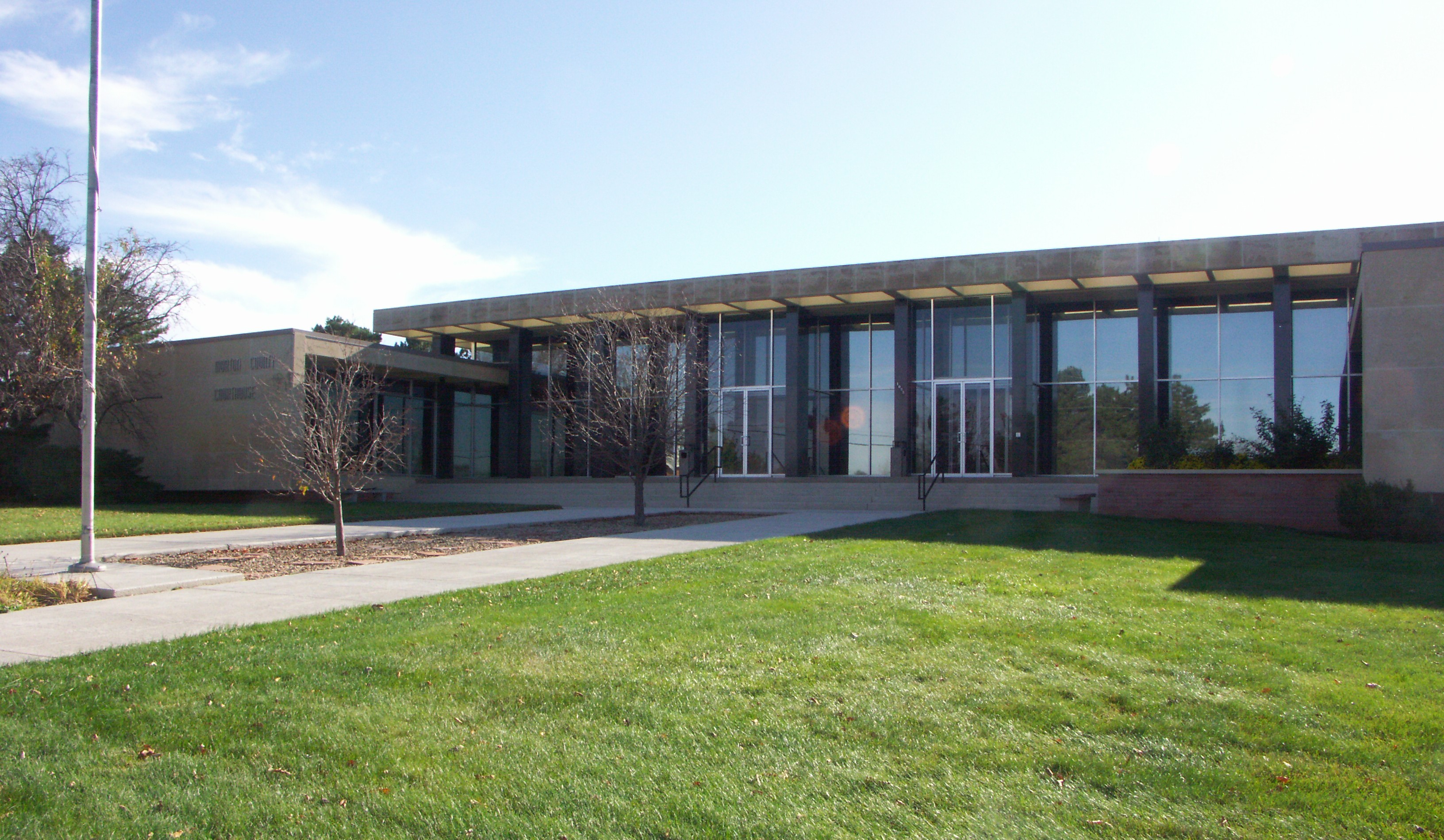
- Morton County Courthouse in Elkhart (2009)

- Location within the U.S. state of Kansas
- Coordinates: 37°12′N 101°48′W
- Country: United States
- State: Kansas
- Founded: February 20, 1886
- Named for: Oliver Morton
- Seat: Elkhart
- Largest city: Elkhart

Area
  - Total: 730 sq mi (1,900 km^{2})
  - Land: 730 sq mi (1,900 km^{2})
  - Water: 0.2 sq mi (0.52 km^{2}) 0.03%

Population (2020)
  - Total: 2,701
  - Estimate (2025): 2,470 ▼
  - Density: 3.7/sq mi (1.4/km^{2})
- Time zone: UTC−6 (Central)
  - Summer (DST): UTC−5 (CDT)
- Area code: 620
- Congressional district: 1st
- Website: mtcoks.com

Morton County is a county in the southwestern corner of the U.S. state of Kansas. Its county seat and largest city is Elkhart. As of the 2020 census, the county population was 2,701. The county was named after Oliver Morton, the 14th governor of the state of Indiana.

== History ==
=== Early history ===
For many millennia, the Great Plains of North America was inhabited by nomadic Native Americans. From the 16th century to 18th century, the Kingdom of France claimed ownership of large parts of North America. In 1762, after the French and Indian War, France secretly ceded New France to Spain, per the Treaty of Fontainebleau.

=== 19th century ===
In 1802, Spain returned most of the land to France, but keeping title to about 7,500 square miles. In 1803, most of the land for modern day Kansas was acquired by the United States from France as part of the 828,000 square mile Louisiana Purchase for 2.83 cents per acre.

In 1848, after the Mexican–American War, the territorial gain in the Treaty of Guadalupe Hidalgo with Mexico brought into the United States all or part of land for ten future states, including southwest Kansas.

From 1821 to late 1860s, the Santa Fe Trail was active across Morton County.

In 1854, the Kansas Territory was organized, then in 1861 Kansas became the 34th U.S. state. In 1886, Morton County was carved out of Seward County and organized, and named for Oliver Morton, who was a United States senator from Indiana from 1867 to 1877.

The initial organization of Morton County was marked by controversy over the location of the county seat. Two petitions were submitted, one for Frisco with 1,488 signatures and another for Richfield with 1,473. Due to discrepancies in the number of signatures compared to eligible voters, an investigation delayed the decision until November 1886, when Richfield was officially declared the temporary county seat. Following this, Richfield was confirmed as the permanent county seat in a February 1887 election, amidst reports of political maneuvering.

Settlement in Morton County came largely from other parts of Kansas. The county experienced significant fluctuations in population due to economic conditions, dropping from 2,560 in the years following its organization to as low as 304 over the next decade.

=== 20th century ===
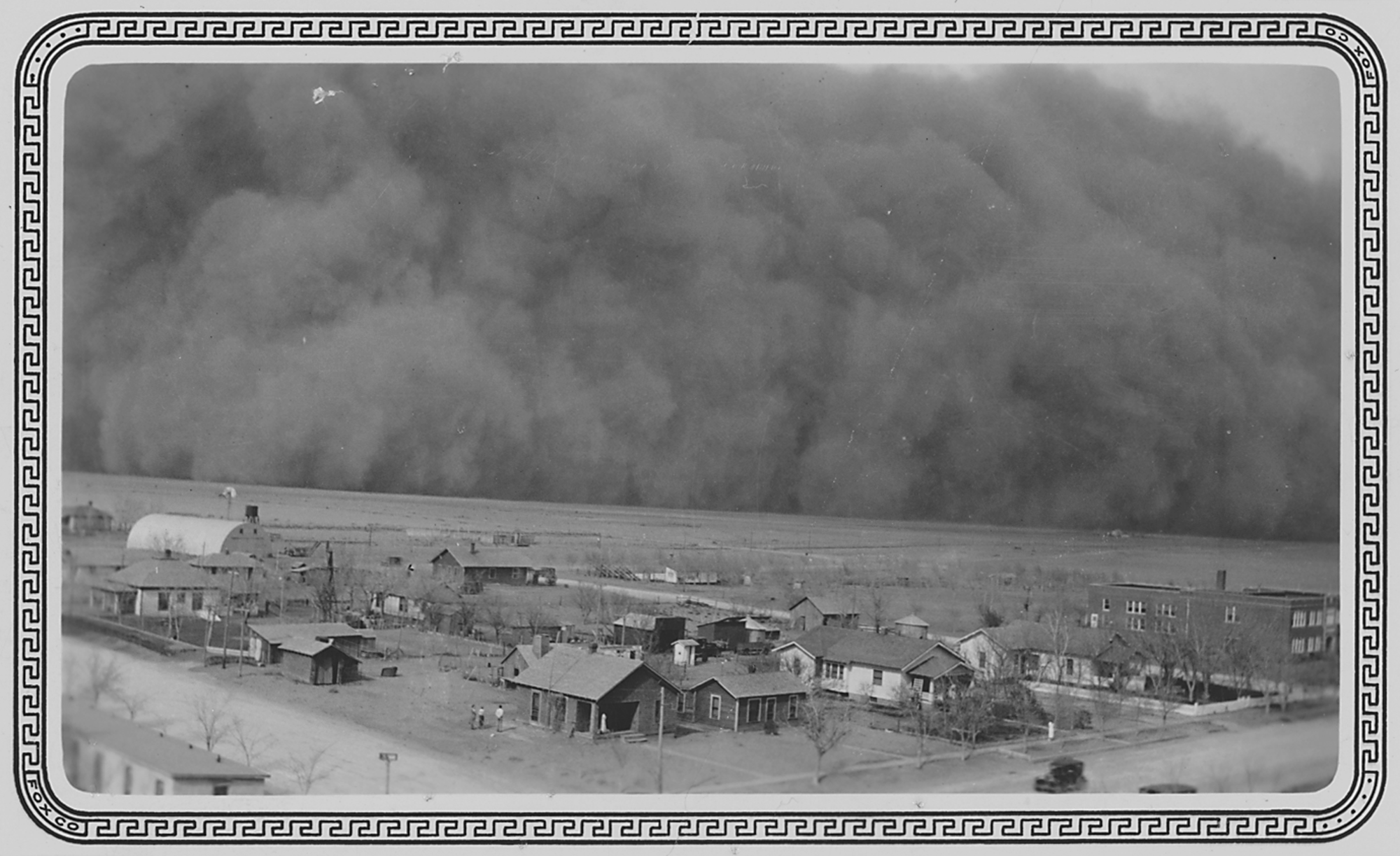
Dust storm in Rolla on May 6, 1935

Area affected by 1930s Dust Bowl

In the 1930s, the prosperity of the area was severely affected by its location within the Dust Bowl. This catastrophe intensified the economic impact of the Great Depression in the region. Morton County was the most devastated county in the Dust Bowl and lost almost one-half of its population in the 1930s. The U.S. government purchased some of the impacted and abandoned land and eventually incorporated it into the Comanche National Grassland.

In 1961, the county seat was moved from Richfield to Elkhart.

== Geography ==
According to the U.S. Census Bureau, the county has a total area of 730 square miles (1,900 km^{2}), of which 730 square miles (1,900 km^{2}) is land and 0.2 square miles (0.52 km^{2}) (0.03%) is water. The county is the location of the 8 Mile Corner tripoint, where Kansas borders Colorado and Oklahoma.

=== Major highways ===
- Kansas Highway 27
- Kansas Highway 51
- U.S. Highway 56

=== Adjacent counties ===
- Stanton County (north)
- Stevens County (east)
- Texas County, Oklahoma (south)
- Cimarron County, Oklahoma (southwest)
- Baca County, Colorado (west/Mountain Time border)

=== National protected area ===
- Cimarron National Grassland (part)

== Demographics ==
Historical population
Census	Pop.	Note	%±
1890	724		—
1900	304		−58.0%
1910	1,333		338.5%
1920	3,177		138.3%
1930	4,092		28.8%
1940	2,186		−46.6%
1950	2,610		19.4%
1960	3,354		28.5%
1970	3,576		6.6%
1980	3,454		−3.4%
1990	3,480		0.8%
2000	3,496		0.5%
2010	3,233		−7.5%
2020	2,701		−16.5%
2025 (est.)	2,470	▼	−8.6%
U.S. Decennial Census; 1790-1960 1900-1990; 1990-2000 2010-2020

=== 2020 census ===
As of the 2020 census, the county had a population of 2,701. The median age was 42.2 years. 24.4% of residents were under the age of 18 and 20.8% of residents were 65 years of age or older. For every 100 females there were 95.9 males, and for every 100 females age 18 and over there were 96.4 males age 18 and over.

0.0% of residents lived in urban areas, while 100.0% lived in rural areas.

The racial makeup of the county was 76.9% White, 0.7% Black or African American, 0.6% American Indian and Alaska Native, 1.1% Asian, 0.3% Native Hawaiian and Pacific Islander, 10.2% from some other race, and 10.1% from two or more races. Hispanic or Latino residents of any race comprised 21.9% of the population.

There were 1,053 households in the county, of which 31.6% had children under the age of 18 living with them and 23.4% had a female householder with no spouse or partner present. About 27.3% of all households were made up of individuals and 14.4% had someone living alone who was 65 years of age or older.

There were 1,316 housing units, of which 20.0% were vacant. Among occupied housing units, 70.4% were owner-occupied and 29.6% were renter-occupied. The homeowner vacancy rate was 4.2% and the rental vacancy rate was 18.0%.

=== 2000 census ===
As of the census of 2000, there were 3,496 people, 1,306 households, and 961 families residing in the county. The population density was 5 people per square mile (1.9 people/km^{2}). There were 1,519 housing units at an average density of 2 per square mile (0.77/km^{2}). The racial makeup of the county was 88.39% White, 0.20% Black or African American, 1.14% Native American, 1.06% Asian, 7.52% from other races, and 1.69% from two or more races. 14.10% of the population were Hispanic or Latino of any race.

There were 1,306 households, out of which 36.60% had children under the age of 18 living with them, 64.20% were married couples living together, 6.80% had a female householder with no husband present, and 26.40% were non-families. 24.30% of all households were made up of individuals, and 9.20% had someone living alone who was 65 years of age or older. The average household size was 2.63 and the average family size was 3.15.

In the county, the population was spread out, with 29.30% under the age of 18, 8.00% from 18 to 24, 27.20% from 25 to 44, 21.50% from 45 to 64, and 13.90% who were 65 years of age or older. The median age was 36 years. For every 100 females there were 94.40 males. For every 100 females age 18 and over, there were 93.70 males.

The median income for a household in the county was $37,232, and the median income for a family was $43,494. Males had a median income of $31,875 versus $19,474 for females. The per capita income for the county was $17,076. About 8.50% of families and 10.50% of the population were below the poverty line, including 14.00% of those under age 18 and 5.20% of those age 65 or over.

== Government ==
Morton County is nearly always won by the Republican candidate for president. Jimmy Carter almost carried the county in 1976, but Gerald Ford eventually won by three votes, a margin of .2%. The last time a Democrat won Morton County was Lyndon B. Johnson in 1964, marking the only time since Franklin D. Roosevelt carried it in 1936.

=== Presidential elections ===
Presidential election results

United States presidential election results for Morton County, Kansas
Year	Republican		Democratic		Third party(ies)	
Year	No.	%	No.	%	No.	%
1888	333	58.01%	205	35.71%	36	6.27%
1892	106	57.61%	0	0.00%	78	42.39%
1896	52	58.43%	36	40.45%	1	1.12%
1900	51	60.00%	34	40.00%	0	0.00%
1904	53	54.08%	44	44.90%	1	1.02%
1908	154	50.49%	140	45.90%	11	3.61%
1912	120	33.99%	144	40.79%	89	25.21%
1916	405	42.41%	457	47.85%	93	9.74%
1920	783	72.97%	266	24.79%	24	2.24%
1924	669	55.02%	286	23.52%	261	21.46%
1928	1,010	78.78%	259	20.20%	13	1.01%
1932	621	34.63%	1,093	60.96%	79	4.41%
1936	636	41.81%	876	57.59%	9	0.59%
1940	643	55.72%	503	43.59%	8	0.69%
1944	617	62.51%	367	37.18%	3	0.30%
1948	624	52.61%	545	45.95%	17	1.43%
1952	893	69.93%	362	28.35%	22	1.72%
1956	814	64.76%	436	34.69%	7	0.56%
1960	918	60.67%	586	38.73%	9	0.59%
1964	609	39.01%	938	60.09%	14	0.90%
1968	770	51.03%	475	31.48%	264	17.50%
1972	1,165	72.68%	363	22.65%	75	4.68%
1976	738	48.91%	735	48.71%	36	2.39%
1980	1,157	69.61%	414	24.91%	91	5.48%
1984	1,533	81.80%	322	17.18%	19	1.01%
1988	1,074	64.35%	569	34.09%	26	1.56%
1992	915	54.79%	398	23.83%	357	21.38%
1996	1,073	67.87%	376	23.78%	132	8.35%
2000	1,203	77.26%	321	20.62%	33	2.12%
2004	1,287	81.66%	276	17.51%	13	0.82%
2008	1,153	82.24%	229	16.33%	20	1.43%
2012	1,072	83.88%	189	14.79%	17	1.33%
2016	995	83.47%	147	12.33%	50	4.19%
2020	1,034	86.31%	150	12.52%	14	1.17%
2024	909	85.75%	131	12.36%	20	1.89%

=== Laws ===
The Kansas Constitution was amended in 1986 to allow the sale of alcoholic liquor by the individual drink with the approval of voters, either with or without a minimum of 30% of sales coming from food. Morton County is one of 35 counties in the state that allows for the sale of liquor by the drink without the minimum food sales stipulation.

== Education ==
School districts which cover portions of the county include:

- Rolla USD 217
- Elkhart USD 218

== Communities ==
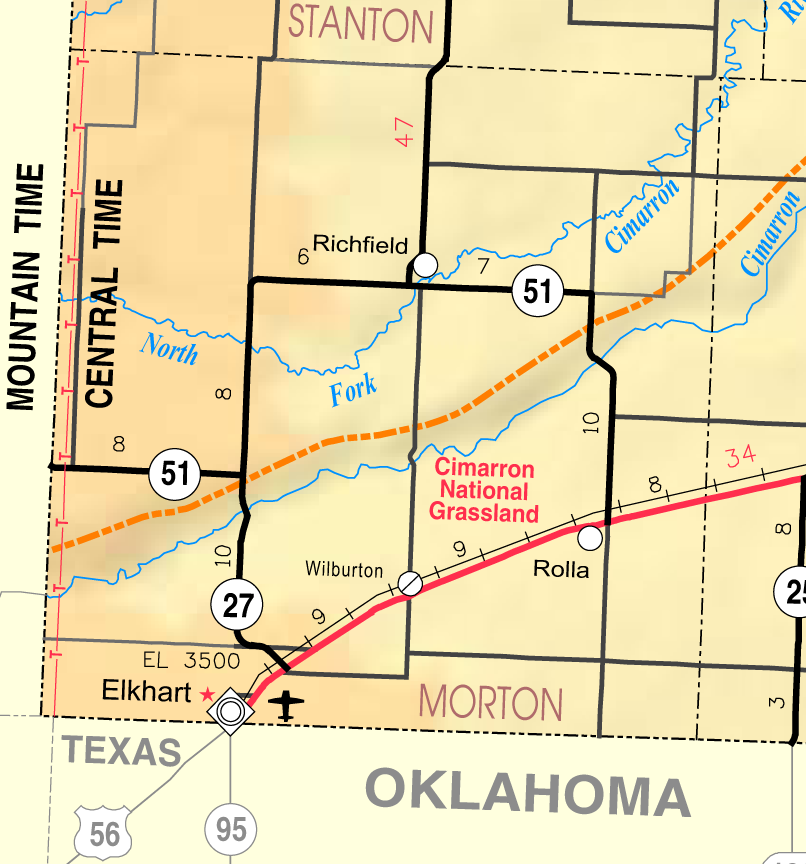
2005 map of Morton County (map legend)

List of townships / incorporated cities / unincorporated communities / extinct former communities within Morton County.

=== Cities ===
- Elkhart (county seat)
- Richfield
- Rolla

=== Unincorporated community ===
- Wilburton

=== Townships ===
Morton County is divided into six townships. None of the cities within the county are considered governmentally independent, and all figures for the townships include those of the cities. In the following table, the population center is the largest city (or cities) included in that township's population total, if it is of a significant size.

Sources: 2000 U.S. Gazetteer from the U.S. Census Bureau.
Township	FIPS	Population center	Population	Population density /km^{2} (/sq mi)	Land area km^{2} (sq mi)	Water area km^{2} (sq mi)	Water %	Geographic coordinates
Cimarron	13350		67	0 (1)	173 (67)	0 (0)	0%	37°4′11″N 101°46′45″W
Jones	35650		17	0 (0)	140 (54)	0 (0)	0%	37°1′4″N 101°56′56″W
Richfield	59225		218	0 (1)	649 (251)	0 (0)	0%	37°14′37″N 101°42′36″W
Rolla	60925	Rolla	650	2 (5)	373 (144)	0 (0)	0%	37°6′46″N 101°37′42″W
Talgoa	69975	Elkhart	2,437	17 (44)	142 (55)	0 (0)	0%	37°0′22″N 101°53′42″W
Westola	77225		107	0 (1)	412 (159)	0 (0)	0.01%	37°14′19″N 101°58′40″W

== See also ==
- Dry counties
- Cimarron National Grassland

Community information for Kansas

- Kansas locations by per capita income
- List of counties in Kansas
- List of townships in Kansas
- List of cities in Kansas
- List of unincorporated communities in Kansas
- List of ghost towns in Kansas
