= Cimarron National Grassland =

American national grassland in Kansas

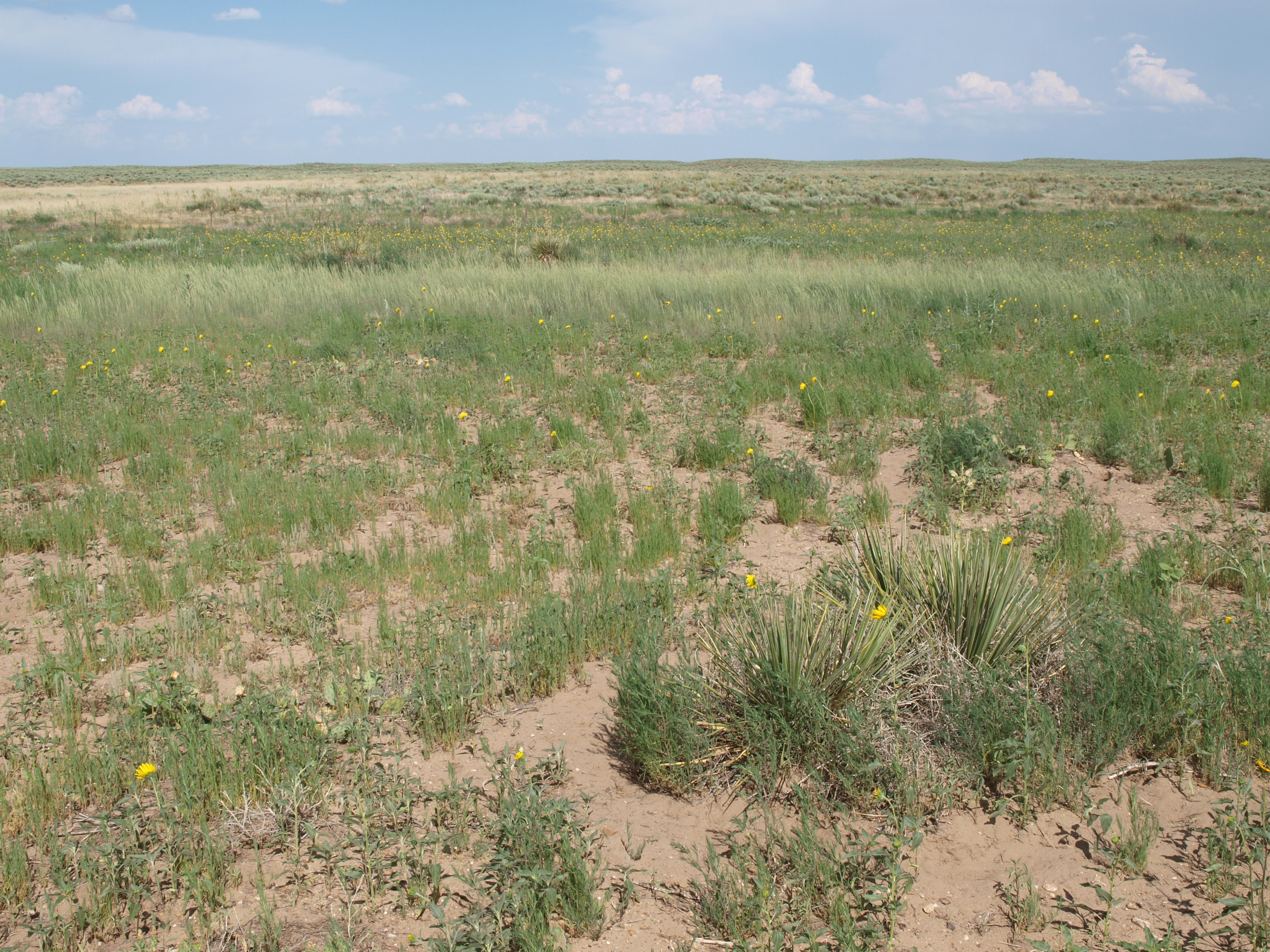
- Plant cover on sandy soils of the Cimarron National Grassland.

- Location within Kansas
- Location: Elkhart, Kansas, Kansas, United States
- Coordinates: 37°07′27″N 101°47′24″W
- Area: 108,175 acres (437.77 km^{2})
- Elevation: 1,033 m (3,389 ft)
- Established: United States National Grassland
- Operator: U.S. Forest Service, Kansas Department of Wildlife, Parks and Tourism
- Website: www.fs.usda.gov/r02/psicc/offices

Cimarron National Grassland is a National Grassland located in Morton County, Kansas, United States, with a very small part extending eastward into Stevens County. Cimarron National Grassland is located near Comanche National Grassland which is across the border in Colorado. The grassland is administered by the Forest Service together with the Pike and San Isabel National Forests and the Comanche National Grassland, from common headquarters located in Pueblo, Colorado. There are local ranger district offices in Elkhart, Kansas. The grassland is the largest area of public land in the state of Kansas.

== Geography ==
The Cimarron National Grassland once consisted of 108,175 acres (43,777 ha) of Great Plains bisected by the Cimarron River, though after the flood on January 29, 2023, this no longer remains true. The elevations on the Grassland range from 3,100 to 3,700 feet (940 to 1,130 m). The terrain is mostly flat, sloping downward west to east, although bluffs rise about one hundred feet (30 m) above the valley of the Cimarron. Vegetation is mostly shortgrass prairie grassland, dominated by sand sagebrush in salty soils. Groves of cottonwood and other trees are found near the river.

The climate of the National Grassland is semi-arid, receiving about 18 inches (460 mm) of precipitation annually, mostly in summer. High winds are common and further desiccate the soil. Summer temperatures are hot, with an average high of 93 °F (34 °C) and an average low of 64 °F (18 °C) in July. Winters are cold with an average high of 45 °F (7 °C) and an average low of 18 °F (−8 °C) in January. The all-time high temperature is 110 °F (43 °C) and the all-time low is −22 °F (−30 °C).

The Cimarron River flows through the grassland. From late summer through winter it is usually dry above ground, yet lush vegetation still grows on the banks. Middle Spring flows year round and beaver dams create pools of water nearby. Point of Rocks, a large rock outcropping overlooking the Cimarron River valley, was an important landmark for travelers heading west on the Cimarron Cutoff, and for modern day ranchers, because many springs exist in the area. Point of Rocks has an elevation of 3,540 feet (1,080 m).

== History ==
Map of states and counties affected by the Dust Bowl between 1935 and 1938 originally prepared by the Soil Conservation Service. The most severely affected counties are colored .

The present-day Cimarron National Grassland was the territory of the Comanche and other Indian tribes allied to them. In 1822, William Becknell was the first to traverse the Santa Fe Trail by wagon, pioneering the alternate route called the Cimarron cut-off which passed through the National Grassland. Middle Spring was one of the three reliable sources of good water along more than 150 miles (240 km) of the Cimarron Cutoff trail. In or near the Grassland, mountain man Jedediah Smith was killed by Comanches in 1831.

In 1879, the Beaty Brothers established Point of Rocks Ranch, the first in the area. Wheat farmers soon moved in and prospered in wet years, but the drought of the 1930s caused the Dust Bowl. Morton County, Kansas, was the most devastated county in the nation. The Federal government bought land from bankrupt farmers, restored the original prairie, and in 1960 the Cimarron National Grassland was created. The grassland is dedicated to "water conservation, wildlife management, recreation, cattle grazing, and mineral production." Cattle are grazed and oil and gas wells are found on the Grassland.

In May 2011, there was a substantial wildfire known as the Tunner Fire, which blanketed approximately one half of the park along with several thousands of acres of private prairie and the campground. However, rains in the spring of 2012 brought about a significant turnaround. The land greened up and the park's management reopened many of its sections.

== Recreation ==
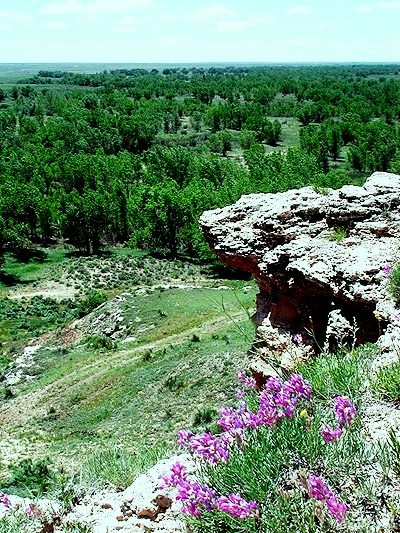
Point of Rocks. In the background is the wooded valley of the Cimarron River.

Access to most of the recreation opportunities in the Cimarron National Grassland are reached 7 mi (11 km) north of Elkhart via highway 27. Activities include camping, hiking, horseback riding, fishing, hunting, and a car tour.

The grassland includes 23 miles (37 km) of the Santa Fe National Historic Trail. The ruts left by wagon trains are still visible. A mowed strip of land, called a companion trail, 19 miles (31 km) long, runs alongside the Santa Fe Trail. The Turkey Trail is 10.5 miles (16.9 km) long and runs through the wooded area along the Cimarron River. The Cimarron Recreation area offers tent and trailer camping, picnicking, a group site, and access to the Turkey Trail.

Several fishing ponds, including four at the Cimarron Recreation Area, are stocked with rainbow trout in the winter and channel catfish in the summer. Other sport fish include crappie, sunfish, and largemouth bass. Animals hunted include whitetail deer, pronghorn, quail, pheasant, prairie dog and jack rabbit.

A car tour of approximately 30 miles (48 km) on mostly dirt roads leads to most of the points of interest on the Grassland, including a prairie dog town, Point of Rocks, and the Santa Fe Trail. There are about 5 trails that span across the grassland: Conestoga Trailhead, Murphy Trailhead, Companion Trail, Santa Fe Trail, and the Turkey Trail. Camping is allowed at the Cimarron Campground and the recreation area. You can fish at Cimarron Ponds, Mallard Ponds, Point of Rocks Ponds, and Wilburton Pond.

The Cimarron Grassland has a population of rare lesser prairie chickens and has two viewing areas. The males perform their courting rituals from mid-March until early June. Elk were reintroduced into the Grassland in 1981 and a herd of 50 is maintained. Hunting by special permit is sometimes allowed to thin the herd.

== See also ==
- List of protected grasslands of North America
