= Elkhart, Kansas =

City in Morton County, Kansas

- City and County seat
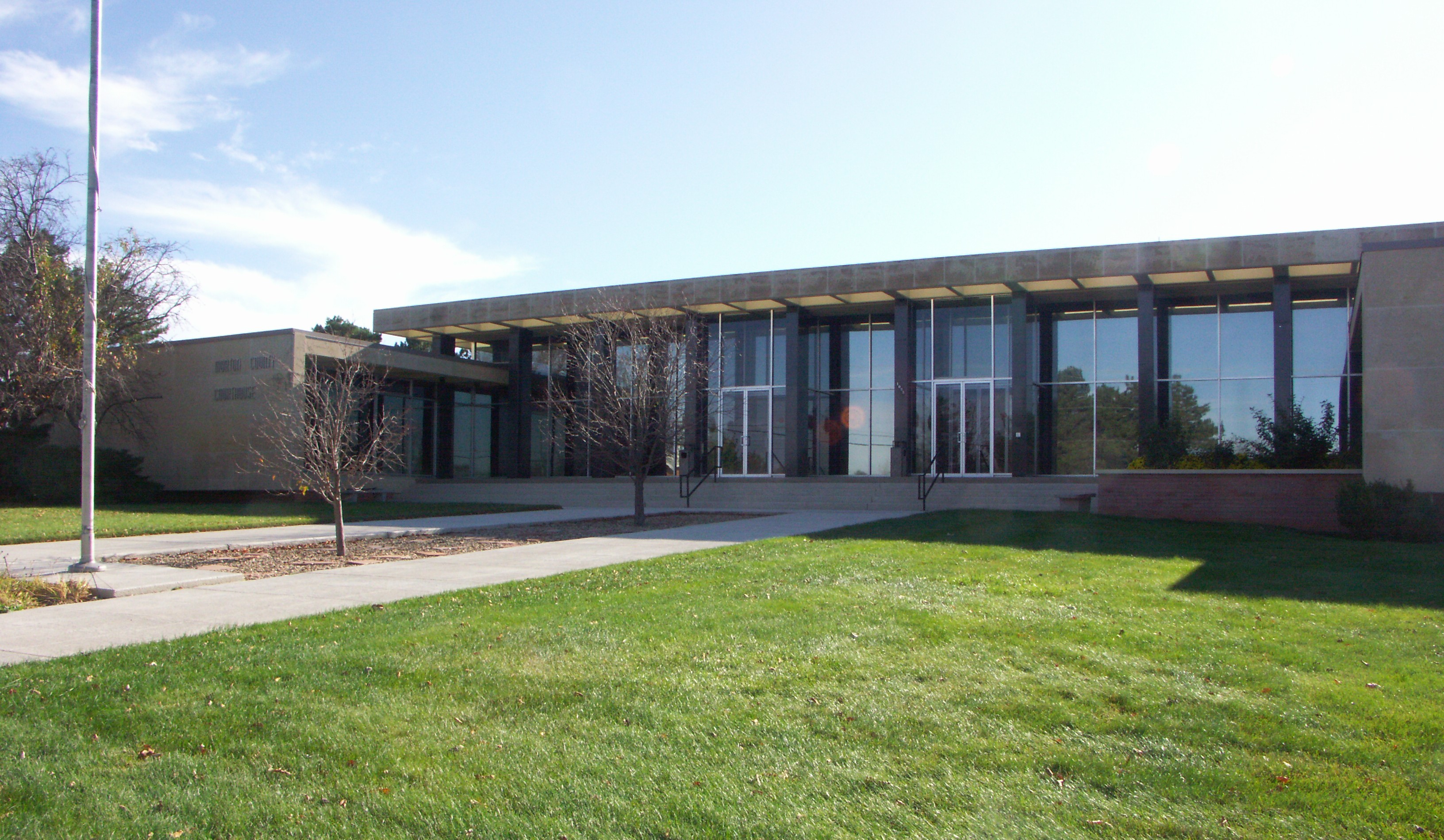
- Morton County Court House (2009)

- Location within Morton County and Kansas

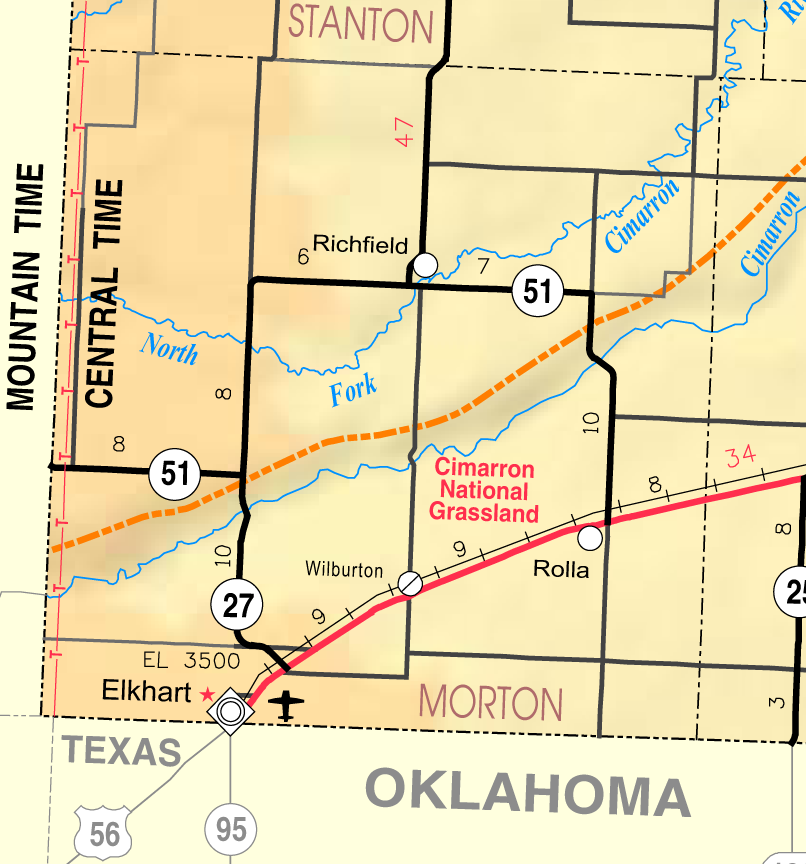
- KDOT map of Morton County (legend)
- Coordinates: 37°0′11″N 101°53′40″W
- Country: United States
- State: Kansas
- County: Morton
- Founded: 1913
- Incorporated: 1913
- Named for: Elkhart, Indiana

Government
  - Type: Mayor–Council
  - Mayor: Leo Carrillo

Area
  - Total: 2.05 sq mi (5.32 km^{2})
  - Land: 2.05 sq mi (5.32 km^{2})
  - Water: 0 sq mi (0.00 km^{2})
- Elevation: 3,596 ft (1,096 m)

Population (2020)
  - Total: 1,888
  - Density: 919/sq mi (355/km^{2})
- Time zone: UTC-6 (CST)
  - Summer (DST): UTC-5 (CDT)
- ZIP Code: 67950
- Area code: 620
- FIPS code: 20-20350
- GNIS ID: 2394655
- Website: City website

Elkhart is a city in and the county seat of Morton County, Kansas, United States. As of the 2020 census, the population of the city was 1,888. The southern edge of the city is the Kansas–Oklahoma state border, and the city is 8.5 miles (13.7 km) from the Kansas–Colorado border.

== History ==
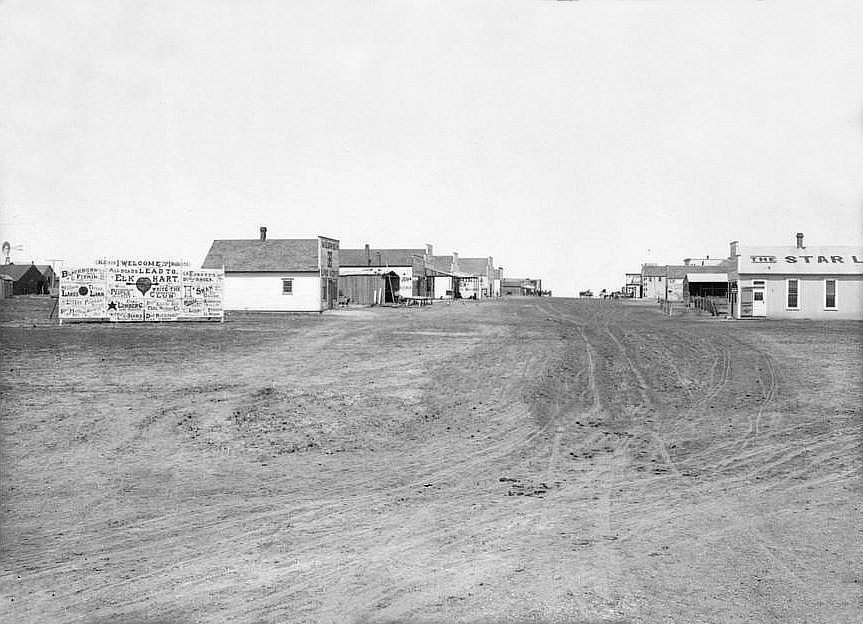
Elkhart, circa 1905

Elkhart was founded in 1913, and was named after Elkhart, Indiana.

Elkhart grew up along the tracks of the Atchison, Topeka and Santa Fe Railway, which came in from Dodge City. Elkhart was also the starting point of the Elkhart and Santa Fe Railway. The latter line, both leased to and a wholly owned subsidiary of the Santa Fe railway, was built in 1925 to Felt, Oklahoma, and extended into New Mexico in 1932; but, was abandoned in 1942.

In 1961, the county seat was moved from Richfield to Elkhart.

== Geography ==
According to the United States Census Bureau, the city has a total area of 2.11 square miles (5.46 km^{2}), all land.

=== Climate ===
Elkhart has a cool semi-arid climate (Köppen BSk) characterized by generally dry winters with extreme temperature variations, and hot summers with occasional heavy precipitation from thunder showers or storms.

During winter, because western Kansas lies both on the edge of the subtropical anticyclones and in the rain shadow of westerly winds crossing the Rocky Mountains, the region is generally dry: no measurable precipitation fell in Elkhart between 25 December 1903 and 2 April 1904, while monthly precipitation above 2 inches or 50.8 millimetres has never been recorded during January and is observed fewer than one year in ten during November, December or February. Temperatures can vary greatly during this season: strong chinook winds can drive temperatures above 80 °F or 26.7 °C even in the depth of winter, with 70 °F or 21.1 °C reached on average during six days between December and February, seven during November and eight during March. Nevertheless, cold outbreaks from Canada drive temperatures to or below 0 °F or −17.8 °C on an average of 3.6 nights per winter. The coldest temperature recorded in Elkhart has been −22 °F or −30 °C on January 19, 1984, while the hottest winter temperature has been 87 °F or 30.6 °C on February 1, 1963.

Snowfall is generally light due to dryness; however in the extremely wet and cold February 1903, 41.0 inches or 1.04 metres fell, being the major factor behind a record seasonal snowfall of 59.0 inches (1.50 m) between July 1902 and June 1903. In contrast, only a trace of snow was recorded between July 1949 and January 1950.

In the summer, the climate is generally very hot with relief from thunderstorms that provide most of the 18.9 inches or 480 millimetres of precipitation expected during one year. When an upper level anticyclone moves poleward, the atmosphere can become very stable and produce sustained extreme heat: in the hottest month of July 1980, the average maximum was 103.0 °F or 39.4 °C and all but seven days topped 100 °F or 37.8 °C. When the high retreats southward or a trough forms over the interior of the United States during the summer, however, precipitation can be heavy, with 10.91 inches or 277.1 millimetres falling in April 2016, 10.19 inches or 258.8 millimetres in June 2004 and 9.86 inches or 250.4 millimetres in July 1927. The wettest calendar year has been 1941, with 29.74 inches or 755.4 millimetres and the driest, 1937 when only 9.03 inches or 229.4 millimetres fell.

Climate data for Elkhart, Kansas, 1991–2020 normals, extremes 1900–present
Month	Jan	Feb	Mar	Apr	May	Jun	Jul	Aug	Sep	Oct	Nov	Dec	Year
Record high °F (°C)	83 (28)	87 (31)	99 (37)	96 (36)	104 (40)	110 (43)	110 (43)	108 (42)	105 (41)	97 (36)	91 (33)	85 (29)	110 (43)
Mean maximum °F (°C)	70.1 (21.2)	74.9 (23.8)	83.0 (28.3)	88.4 (31.3)	95.7 (35.4)	102.4 (39.1)	103.2 (39.6)	100.9 (38.3)	97.6 (36.4)	90.6 (32.6)	79.4 (26.3)	70.5 (21.4)	104.7 (40.4)
Mean daily maximum °F (°C)	47.7 (8.7)	51.5 (10.8)	60.4 (15.8)	68.8 (20.4)	79.0 (26.1)	89.4 (31.9)	93.4 (34.1)	90.8 (32.7)	83.5 (28.6)	71.3 (21.8)	58.3 (14.6)	48.0 (8.9)	70.2 (21.2)
Daily mean °F (°C)	34.5 (1.4)	37.3 (2.9)	45.7 (7.6)	54.0 (12.2)	64.2 (17.9)	74.7 (23.7)	79.2 (26.2)	77.0 (25.0)	69.1 (20.6)	56.6 (13.7)	44.8 (7.1)	35.3 (1.8)	56.0 (13.3)
Mean daily minimum °F (°C)	21.3 (−5.9)	23.2 (−4.9)	31.0 (−0.6)	39.2 (4.0)	49.5 (9.7)	60.0 (15.6)	64.9 (18.3)	63.2 (17.3)	54.8 (12.7)	41.9 (5.5)	31.2 (−0.4)	22.6 (−5.2)	41.9 (5.5)
Mean minimum °F (°C)	5.1 (−14.9)	9.0 (−12.8)	15.3 (−9.3)	25.8 (−3.4)	36.9 (2.7)	50.2 (10.1)	57.7 (14.3)	55.9 (13.3)	42.0 (5.6)	27.2 (−2.7)	16.1 (−8.8)	6.8 (−14.0)	−0.1 (−17.8)
Record low °F (°C)	−22 (−30)	−18 (−28)	−18 (−28)	8 (−13)	21 (−6)	33 (1)	45 (7)	43 (6)	25 (−4)	6 (−14)	−7 (−22)	−18 (−28)	−22 (−30)
Average precipitation inches (mm)	0.43 (11)	0.31 (7.9)	1.00 (25)	1.86 (47)	2.22 (56)	2.55 (65)	2.94 (75)	2.95 (75)	1.24 (31)	1.67 (42)	0.49 (12)	0.74 (19)	18.40 (467)
Average snowfall inches (cm)	4.2 (11)	2.1 (5.3)	3.5 (8.9)	0.4 (1.0)	0.8 (2.0)	0.0 (0.0)	0.0 (0.0)	0.0 (0.0)	0.0 (0.0)	0.7 (1.8)	1.2 (3.0)	4.7 (12)	17.6 (45)
Average precipitation days (≥ 0.01 in)	2.5	2.7	3.8	5.4	6.3	6.8	7.5	7.1	4.4	4.0	2.7	3.5	56.7
Average snowy days (≥ 0.1 in)	2.0	1.5	1.4	0.2	0.0	0.0	0.0	0.0	0.0	0.3	0.8	2.2	8.4
Source 1: NOAA
Source 2: National Weather Service

== Demographics ==
Historical population
Census	Pop.	Note	%±
1920	1,160		—
1930	1,485		28.0%
1940	902		−39.3%
1950	1,132		25.5%
1960	1,780		57.2%
1970	2,089		17.4%
1980	2,243		7.4%
1990	2,318		3.3%
2000	2,233		−3.7%
2010	2,205		−1.3%
2020	1,888		−14.4%
U.S. Decennial Census

=== 2020 census ===
As of the 2020 census, Elkhart had a population of 1,888, with 729 households and 469 families. The population density was 919.2 per square mile (354.9/km^{2}), and there were 907 housing units at an average density of 441.6 per square mile (170.5/km^{2}). The median age was 41.1 years. 25.0% of residents were under the age of 18, 7.7% were from 18 to 24, 21.8% were from 25 to 44, 24.0% were from 45 to 64, and 21.5% were 65 years of age or older. For every 100 females, there were 93.0 males, and for every 100 females age 18 and over there were 91.6 males age 18 and over.

0.0% of residents lived in urban areas, while 100.0% lived in rural areas.

There were 729 households, of which 31.7% had children under the age of 18 living in them. Of all households, 50.3% were married-couple households, 18.9% were households with a male householder and no spouse or partner present, and 24.3% were households with a female householder and no spouse or partner present. About 29.2% of households were made up of individuals and 16.3% had someone living alone who was 65 years of age or older. There were 907 housing units, of which 19.6% were vacant. The homeowner vacancy rate was 5.0% and the rental vacancy rate was 19.9%.

Racial composition as of the 2020 census
Race	Number	Percent
White	1,417	75.1%
Black or African American	14	0.7%
American Indian and Alaska Native	14	0.7%
Asian	22	1.2%
Native Hawaiian and Other Pacific Islander	5	0.3%
Some other race	193	10.2%
Two or more races	223	11.8%
Hispanic or Latino (of any race)	444	23.5%

The non-Hispanic white population was 69.97%.

Demographic estimates

The average household size was 2.2 and the average family size was 3.3. The percent of those with a bachelor's degree or higher was estimated to be 10.9% of the population.

Income and poverty

The 2016–2020 5-year American Community Survey estimates show that the median household income was $40,765 (with a margin of error of ± $7,305) and the median family income was $49,957 (± $15,144). Males had a median income of $33,125 (± $16,302) versus $26,868 (± $23,251) for females. The median income for those above 16 years old was $29,531 (± $15,296). Approximately, 13.6% of families and 18.0% of the population were below the poverty line, including 21.8% of those under the age of 18 and 17.3% of those ages 65 or over.

=== 2010 census ===
As of the census of 2010, there were 2,205 people, 856 households, and 571 families residing in the city. The population density was 1,045.0 inhabitants per square mile (403.5/km^{2}). There were 999 housing units at an average density of 473.5 per square mile (182.8/km^{2}). The racial makeup of the city was 87.7% White, 0.1% African American, 1.2% Native American, 2.5% Asian, 6.8% from other races, and 1.6% from two or more races. Hispanic or Latino of any race were 20.7% of the population.

There were 856 households, of which 33.8% had children under the age of 18 living with them, 52.9% were married couples living together, 9.1% had a female householder with no husband present, 4.7% had a male householder with no wife present, and 33.3% were non-families. 29.2% of all households were made up of individuals, and 14.6% had someone living alone who was 65 years of age or older. The average household size was 2.48 and the average family size was 3.07.

The median age in the city was 38.4 years. 26.4% of residents were under the age of 18; 7.6% were between the ages of 18 and 24; 23% were from 25 to 44; 25.6% were from 45 to 64; and 17.6% were 65 years of age or older. The gender makeup of the city was 47.7% male and 52.3% female.

== Education ==
The community is served by Elkhart USD 218 public school district. The Elkhart High School mascot is Wildcats.

== Notable people ==
- Sanora Babb, writer.
- Thane Baker, sprinter, two-time Olympic medalist (1952 and 1956).
- Glenn Cunningham, long-distance runner, used to hold 1-mile world record, Olympic silver medalist 1936.
- Robelyn Garcia, former professional basketball player.
- Jerry Simmons, NFL strength and conditioning coach for 23 years, uncle of Darrin Simmons.
- Darrin Simmons, football coach, special teams for the Cincinnati Bengals.

== See also ==
- Elkhart–Morton County Airport
- High Plains Public Radio
