= Moscow Township, Kansas =

Township in Stevens County, Kansas, U.S.

Moscow Township
- Township
- Location within Stevens County
- Coordinates: 37.307711°N 101.203482°W
- Country: United States
- State: Kansas
- County: Stevens
- Reestablished: 1920s

Area
  - Total: 170.676 sq mi (442.05 km^{2})
  - Land: 170.665 sq mi (442.02 km^{2})
  - Water: 0.011 sq mi (0.028 km^{2}) 0.01%

Population (2020)
  - Total: 546
  - Density: 3.20/sq mi (1.24/km^{2})
- Time zone: UTC-6 (CST)
  - Summer (DST): UTC-5 (CDT)
- Area code: 620
- GNIS feature ID: 470627

Moscow Township is a township in Stevens County, Kansas, United States. As of the 2020 census, its population was 546.

== History ==
Moscow Township was absorbed into Harmony Township in the 1890s but later reestablished in the 1920s.

== Geography ==
Moscow Township covers an area of 170.676 square miles (442.05 square kilometers).

=== Communities ===
- Moscow

=== Adjacent townships ===
Sullivan Township, Grant County
		north	northeast	Dudley Township, Haskell County
Harmony Township, Stevens County	west	self	east	Seward Township, Seward County
		south	southeast	Liberal Township, Seward County
Center Township, Stevens County

== Transportation ==
=== Major highways ===
- US-56
- K-25

== Demographics ==
As of the 2020 census, there were 546 people and 166 households residing in the township. The population density was 3.20 people per square mile (1.24 people/km^{2}). There were 282 housing units. The racial makeup of the township was 68.7% White, 0.7% Native American, 18.3% from some other race, and 12.3% from two or more races. Hispanics or Latinos of any race were 33.7% of the population.

There were 166 households: 71.1% were married couples living together, 12.7% had a male householder with no spouse present, and 13.3% had a female householder with no spouse present. The average family size was 2.87 people. 24.3% of people in the township older than 24 had a college degree, and the township had an employment rate of 58.7%.
