= Stephen Mosher Wood =

American politician

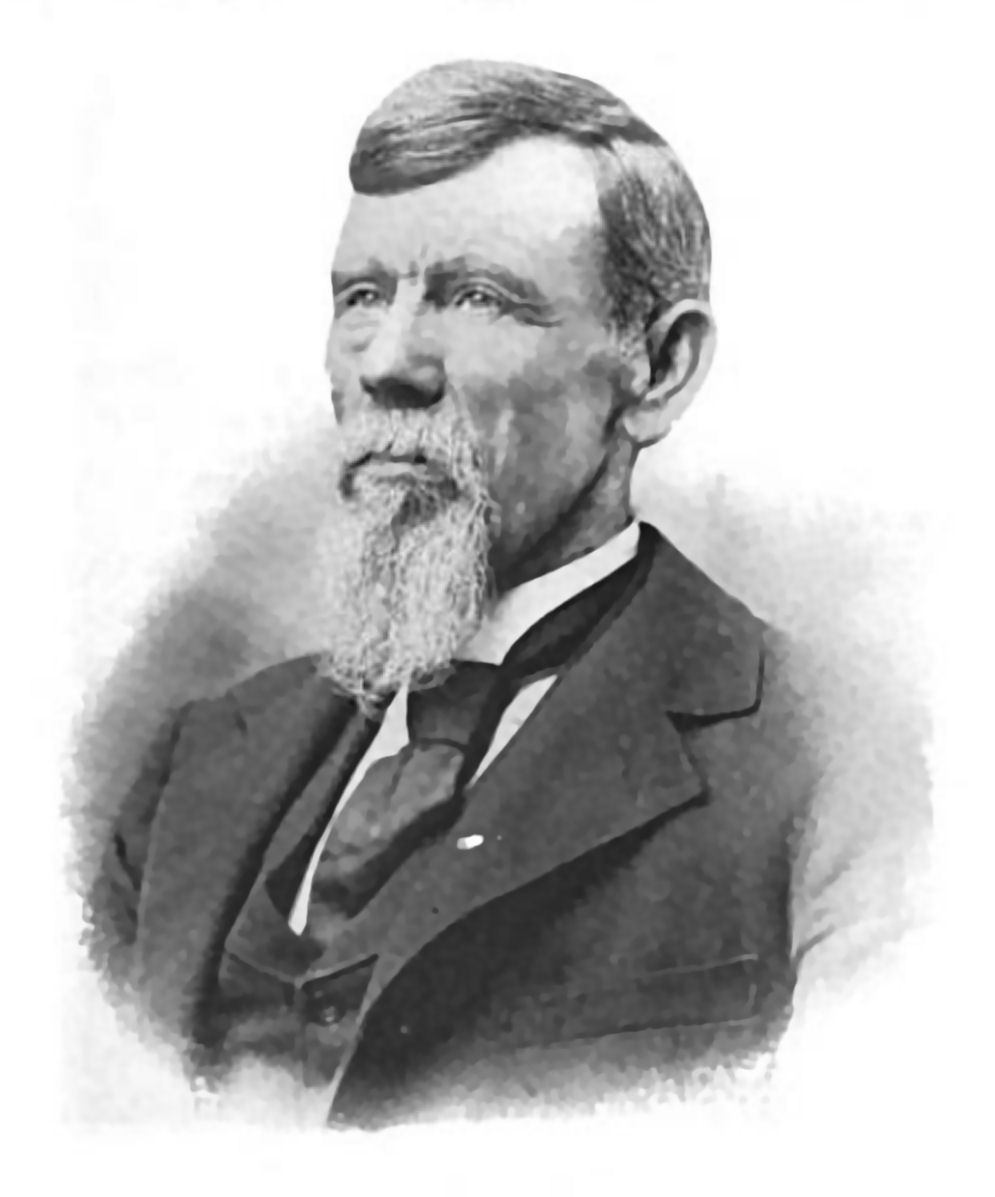
- Stephen Mosher Wood
- Born: June 10, 1832; Mount Gilead, Ohio
- Died: December 24, 1920 (aged 88); Elmdale, Kansas

Stephen Mosher Wood (June 10, 1832 – December 24, 1920) was an American politician. He Wood represented Chase County, Kansas in the Kansas House of Representatives in 1871 and 1875, and was a member of the Kansas Senate in 1876 after replacing S. R. Peters who resigned.

== Early life and family ==
Stephen Mosher Wood was born at Mount Gilead, Ohio, June 10, 1832, to David and Esther Ward (Mosher) Wood. On May 22, 1853 he married Caroline Halsey Breese, and was the father of Wallace Alfred Wood, Clarence David Wood, Carrie Wood and Sidney Breese Wood.

== Military career ==
During the Civil War, Wood was a First lieutenant in the 6th Missouri Volunteer Cavalry as part of his brother, Samuel Newitt Wood's Battalion and later was Brigade Commissary of Subsistence in the Department of the Gulf.

== Legacy ==
Wood was appointed a Regent of the Kansas State Agricultural College in 1877, and reappointed in 1880. Mr. Wood also donated the land for the State YMCA camp south of Elmdale, Kansas which now bears his name.
