= Woodsdale, Kansas =

Ghost town in Stevens County, Kansas

- Ghost town
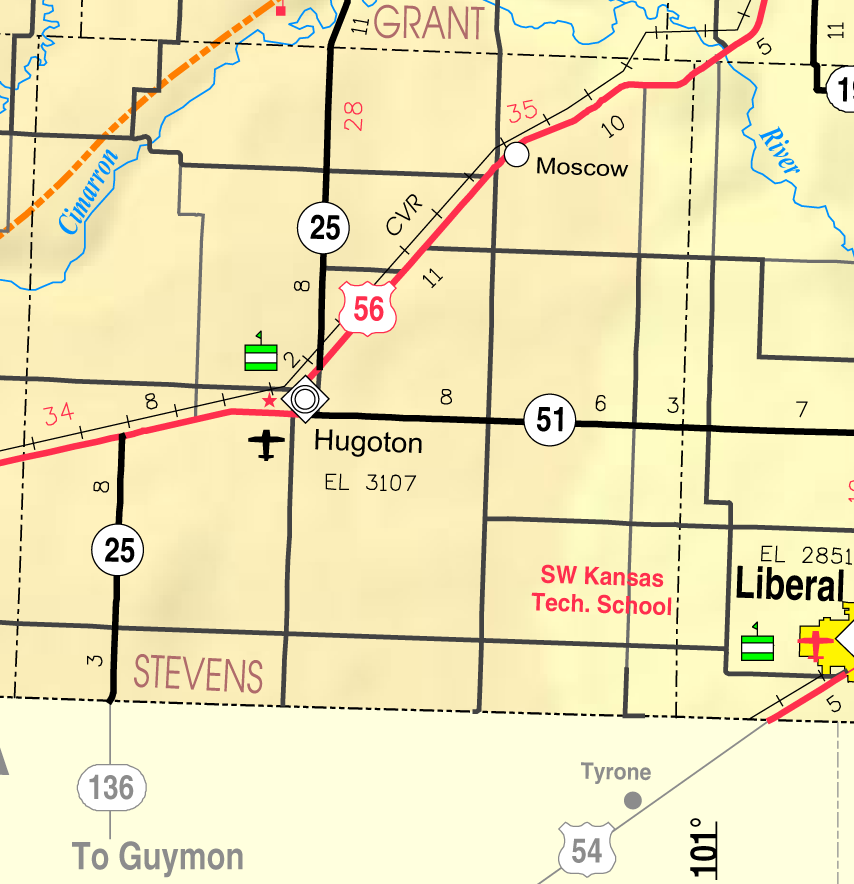
- KDOT map of Stevens County (legend)

- Location within Kansas Location within the United States
- Coordinates: 37°16′21″N 101°18′34″W
- Country: United States
- State: Kansas
- County: Stevens
- Founded: 1886
- Named for: Samuel Wood
- Elevation: 3,113 ft (949 m)

Population
  - Total: 0
- Time zone: UTC-6 (CST)
  - Summer (DST): UTC-5 (CDT)
- Area code: 620
- GNIS ID: 482630

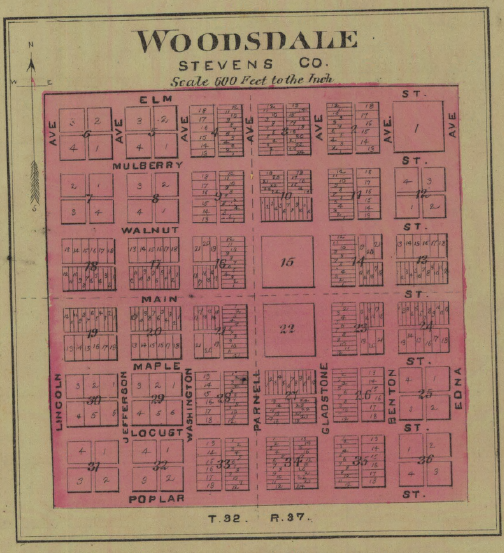
Plat of Woodsdale, c. 1887

Woodsdale is a ghost town in Stevens County, Kansas, United States. It was involved in a county seat war with Hugoton during the 19th century.

== History ==
Woodsdale was laid out in 1886 near the geographical center of the county, with the hope of locating the county seat there.

Samuel Newitt Wood and I. C. Price developed the town and it was named after the former. Its post office was established November 11, 1886, and the town incorporated April 11, 1887. Following the bloody county seat contest in which the governor had to send in two National Guard companies, and which Woodsdale lost to Hugoton, Woodsdale declined. The post office closed March 31, 1915, and there are now no traces of the town remaining. It was located two miles east of Hugoton and six miles north at the intersections of sections 11, 12, 13, & 14.

== Notable people ==
- Mabel Walker Willebrandt was born in Woodsdale.

== See also ==
- Hay Meadow Massacre
- Wild Horse Lake (Oklahoma)
