= Mabel Walker Willebrandt =

American Assistant Attorney General (1889–1963)

Mabel Willebrandt
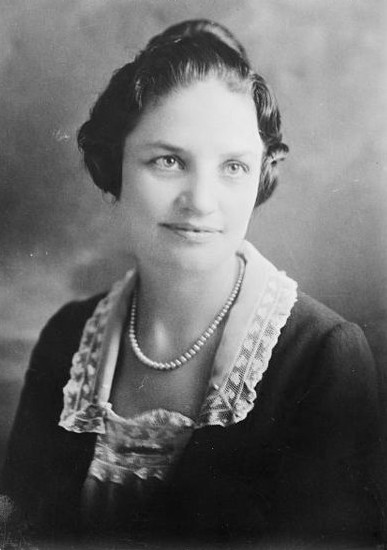

United States Assistant Attorney General
- In office 1921–1929
- President: Warren G. Harding; Calvin Coolidge
- Preceded by: Annette Abbott Adams
- Succeeded by: Roger Wilkins (1966)

Personal details
- Born: Mabel Elizabeth Walker; May 23, 1889 Woodsdale, Kansas, U.S.
- Died: April 6, 1963 (aged 73) Riverside, California, U.S.
- Party: Republican
- Spouse: Arthur Willebrandt (1910–1920)
- Children: 1 (adopted)
- Education: Arizona State University, Tempe (BA); University of Southern California (LLB, LLM)

Mabel Walker Willebrandt (May 23, 1889 – April 6, 1963), popularly known to her contemporaries as the First Lady of Law, was an American lawyer who served as the United States Assistant Attorney General from 1921 to 1929, handling cases concerning violations of the Volstead Act, federal taxation, and the Bureau of Federal Prisons during the Prohibition era. For enforcing the Eighteenth Amendment, the prohibition against the manufacture and sale of alcoholic beverages, she also earned herself a nickname “Prohibition Portia”.

== Early life ==
Willebrandt was born Mabel Elizabeth Walker in Woodsdale, Kansas, on May 23, 1889, to parents who had relocated from Missouri to establish a homestead. Her birth came shortly after the Hay Meadow massacre and her family returned to Missouri as a result of the ongoing conflicts in the county. They relocated first to Lucerne, Missouri, and then Blackwell, Oklahoma, with Mabel's father, David W. Walker, editing and publishing a local newspaper at each stop. As Mabel turned 13, they moved again to Kansas City, Missouri, in part to afford her better educational opportunities.

Initially Mabel Walker enrolled at Park College in nearby Parkville, then after her parents moved again to Buckley, Michigan, she attended the Ferris Institute in Big Rapids, Michigan. Meanwhile for income she took up teaching, and in February 1910 she married Arthur Willebrandt, the principal of the school in Buckley where she taught. The couple then moved to Phoenix, where he recuperated from tuberculosis while she finished college and supported them on a teacher's salary. She graduated from Tempe Normal School, later Arizona State University, in 1911.

== Legal education and early career ==
In 1912, the Willebrandts moved to Los Angeles, where she taught elementary school and attended night classes at the law school of the University of Southern California. She received her law degree from the University of Southern California in 1916 and an LL.M. a year later. During her time at USC, she was a member of Phi Delta Delta legal sorority. The Willebrandts separated in 1916 and divorced in 1924.

During her last semester of law school, Willebrandt began doing pro bono work in the police courts while still teaching full-time. Ultimately, she argued two thousand cases as the city's first female public defender for women in Los Angeles, handling mostly cases of prostitution. She acted as counsel on more than 2,000 cases. Her efforts led courts to permit the testimony of both men and women. She also campaigned successfully for the enactment of a revised community property statute at the state level. After graduating, she opened a practice in downtown Los Angeles with Fred Horowitz, who later built the Chateau Marmont.

During World War I, Willebrandt served as head of the Legal Advisory Board for conscription cases in Los Angeles. In 1921, at age 32, her law school professor and mentor Frank Doherty, as well as Senator Hiram Johnson and all the judges in southern California, recommended her for the post of Assistant Attorney General in the Warren G. Harding administration.

== Prohibition ==
Willebrandt in the Oval Office with Calvin Coolidge (seated) and Congressman Israel M. Foster

Only the second woman to receive an appointment to U.S. assistant attorney general, and the first to serve an extended term, Willebrandt was officially appointed to the position on September 27, 1921. She was the highest-ranking woman in the federal government at the time and first woman to head the tax division. Among her duties, Willebrandt headed the division in the U.S. justice department dealing with federal taxation, federal prisons, and matters relating to the enforcement of the Volstead Act. Under her administration Alderson federal prison, the first facility of its kind for women, was established at Alderson, West Virginia, with Mary Belle Harris as superintendent.

Although a personal opponent of Prohibition, Willebrandt aggressively upheld the Volstead Act. She took the work of enforcing Prohibition so seriously that the press christened her, among other nicknames, "Deborah of the Drys" and "Mrs. Firebrand." In her book, The Inside of Prohibition, she described political interference, incompetent public officials, and public indifference in the federal government's efforts to enforce the law. Willebrandt's insistence to other federal agencies to prosecute bootleggers, specifically the Bureau of Prohibition and law enforcement agencies, were initially hampered by the skepticism of senior officials in the U.S. justice and treasury departments, who frequently overlooked her advice.

Despite the unpopularity of the law among both the general population and within the government, the underfunding of the Prohibition Bureau, and widespread bribery of enforcement agents, Willebrandt focused on reviewing prosecutions for violations of the Volstead Act, rating the work of U.S. Attorneys from inefficient to obstructionist. Willebrandt's actions earned her criticism among American attorneys after she dismissed several prosecutors who were hostile towards the prosecution of Volstead Act-related cases.

During the early years of her administration, she was successful in some of the biggest prosecutions during Prohibition, including the 1923 prosecution of the "Big Four of Savannah," reportedly the largest bootlegging ring in the U.S., as well as the bootlegging operations of Cincinnati bootlegger George Remus. According to the annual report of the U.S. Attorney General, Willebrandt's office had prosecuted 48,734 Prohibition-related cases from June 1924 to June 1925, of which 39,072 resulted in convictions. In addition, she submitted 278 cases of certiorari to the Supreme Court regarding the defense, clarification, and enforcement of the Prohibition Amendment and the Volstead Act. She also argued more than 40 cases before the Supreme Court and won several victories in cases regarding the control of liquor sales on both American and foreign vessels. She developed the idea of prosecuting major crime figures for income tax evasion, an approach the Supreme Court upheld in 1927 and which enabled the successful prosecution of Al Capone in 1931.

Her extensive writing and speech-making in support of Prohibition won praise from President Herbert Hoover. During the 1928 presidential campaign, Democratic candidate and Prohibition opponent Al Smith called her "Prohibition Portia." She also argued for the federal prosecution of major bootleggers, saying that prosecuting speakeasies was "...like trying to dry up the Atlantic Ocean with a blotter."

Among her efforts to enforce Prohibition, Willebrandt proposed the reallocation of federal judges to create more flexibility regarding prosecutions against Prohibition violations, the transfer of enforcement from the Treasury to Justice Department, better articulation and training for law enforcement personnel, and longer sentencing for Prohibition violations; she also recommended J. Edgar Hoover to head the Federal Bureau of Investigation.

During the 1928 presidential election she campaigned openly for Republican Herbert Hoover, who was a "dry" or supporter of Prohibition. Some of her tactics were criticized by Democratic candidate Al Smith, a "wet", particularly when she addressed a gathering of Methodist ministers in Ohio and urged them to tell their congregations to vote for Hoover, supposedly disregarding the established separation of church and state, although it was pointed out that that separation only applies to the use of state power. She also orchestrated several high-profile raids of speakeasies timed to coincide with the Democratic convention where Smith was nominated. After Hoover's election, the press declared that "no other woman has ever had so much influence on a presidential campaign."

== Later years ==
Willebrandt expected to be rewarded for her political loyalty by being appointed U.S. attorney general. But when Hoover passed her over, Willebrandt resigned her post in 1929. She returned to private practice and had offices in Washington D.C. and Los Angeles. She also represented California based Fruit Industries who made Vine-Glo, a grape concentrate product that she had previously ruled legal as assistant attorney general despite it carrying a warning telling people how to make wine from it. This conflict of interest provoked the government to behave more aggressively towards concentrate products during Prohibition.

In 1950, Willebrandt served as counsel to the Screen Directors Guild during a labor hearing. She pioneered the fields of aviation and radio law and became an expert in federal regulations and taxes. Willebrandt represented major industries, including Metro-Goldwyn-Mayer, the Screen Directors Guild of America, Aviation Corp. of America, and California Fruit Industries, a major producer of table wine. She defended Louis B. Mayer before the IRS and represented celebrities such as Jean Harlow, Clark Gable, and Jeanette MacDonald.

Willebrandt (left) with one of the aviators whose careers she helped promote, Jacqueline Cochran

Willebrandt was the first woman to chair a committee of the ABA, heading its committee on aeronautical law. She also got her pilot's license and promoted air travel with Amelia Earhart, a fellow member of the Aeronautical Chamber of Commerce. She also held several honorary doctorates.

After promoting anti-Catholic beliefs, particularly against Democratic candidate Al Smith, who was Catholic, in the 1928 U.S. presidential election, Willebrandt later in life became a Catholic.

Willebrandt died of lung cancer in Riverside, California, on April 6, 1963. She was survived by her adopted daughter, Dorothy Rae. Her lifelong friend, Judge John J. Sirica, who would later preside over the Watergate case, said of her, "If Mabel had worn trousers, she could have been president."

== In popular culture ==
- The 2010 HBO television series Boardwalk Empire features Assistant U.S. Attorney Esther Randolph, a character based on and styled after Willebrandt, portrayed by Julianne Nicholson.
- Willebrandt was featured prominently in the 2011 PBS miniseries Prohibition, by Ken Burns and Lynn Novick.
- Her role as assistant attorney general in the federal prosecution of rum runners during Prohibition was featured in The Real McCoy, a PBS bio-documentary of bootlegger Bill McCoy, one of the main proponents of illegal import of alcohol during the early days of Prohibition.

== Sources ==
- Brown, Dorothy Marie (1984). Mabel Walker Willebrandt: A Study of Power, Loyalty, and Law. University of Tennessee Press. pp. 1–328. ISBN 978-0870494024. OCLC 9556538.
- Kelly, Robert J. (2000). Encyclopedia of Organized Crime in the United States. Westport, Conn.: Greenwood Press. pp. 1–358. ISBN 978-0313306532. OCLC 41612361.
- Phillips, Charles; Axelrod, Alan (2000). Cops, Crooks, and Criminologists : An International Biographical Dictionary of Law Enforcement. New York: Checkmark Books. pp. 1–322. ISBN 978-0816030163. OCLC 43168230.
- Willebrandt, Mabel Walker (1929). The Inside of Prohibition. Indianapolis: Bobbs-Merrill Company. pp. 1–339. OCLC 918347.
