= Liberal Township, Kansas =

Township in Seward County, Kansas, U.S.

Liberal Township
- Township
- Location within Seward County
- Coordinates: 37.126806°N 100.967494°W
- Country: United States
- State: Kansas
- County: Seward

Government
  - District 1–5 County Commissioners: Todd Stanton; Clay Louderback; Jairo Vazquez; John Mettlen; Steven A. Helm

Area
  - Total: 192.725 sq mi (499.16 km^{2})
  - Land: 192.658 sq mi (498.98 km^{2})
  - Water: 0.067 sq mi (0.17 km^{2}) 0.03%

Population (2020)
  - Total: 699
  - Density: 3.63/sq mi (1.40/km^{2})
- Time zone: UTC-6 (CST)
  - Summer (DST): UTC-5 (CDT)
- Area code: 620
- GNIS feature ID: 470668

Liberal Township is a township in Seward County, Kansas, United States. As of the 2020 census, its population was 699.

== Geography ==
Fargo Township covers an area of 192.725 square miles (499.16 square kilometers). The Cimarron River flows through it. The city of Liberal is completely surrounded by the township but is governmentally independent from it.

=== Adjacent townships ===
Seward Township, Seward County
Moscow Township, Stevens County	northwest	north
Center Township, Stevens County	west	self	east	Fargo Township, Seward County
Banner Township, Stevens County; Texas County, Oklahoma	southwest		southeast	Beaver County, Oklahoma

== Transportation ==
=== Major highways ===
- US-54
- US-83
- US-270
- K-51
