= KHQG =

KHQG may refer to:

- Hugoton Municipal Airport (ICAO code KHQG)
- KDKE, a radio station (102.5 FM) licensed to serve Superior, Wisconsin, United States, which held the call sign KHQG from 2008 to 2010
