= HQG =

HQG may refer to:

- Heqing County (Division code: HQG), Dali Bai Autonomous Prefecture, Yunnan, China
- Hugoton Municipal Airport (FAA LID: HQG), a county-owned public-use airport in Stevens County, Kansas, United States
