= Wild Horse Lake (Oklahoma) =

- Location within Oklahoma Location within the United States
- Location: Texas County, Oklahoma
- Coordinates: 36.9189158°N 101.4479383°W
- Type: playa lake
- Basin countries: United States

Wild Horse Lake is a playa lake located in Texas County, Oklahoma. The lake is west of Hooker, east of Hough, just south of the Oklahoma-Kansas border, off State Highway 136.

The lake was the location of the infamous Hay Meadow Massacre (July 1888) in which one faction in the county seat fight in Stevens County, Kansas, killed four members of the opposing faction. Since the killings took place in what was then No Man's Land, no court had jurisdiction over the crime. The lake was also the subject of Oklahoma case law in reference to water appropriations—Depuy V. Hoeme (1980 OK 26, 611 P.2d 228).
