= Vine-Glo =

Grape concentrate, U.S. Prohibition era

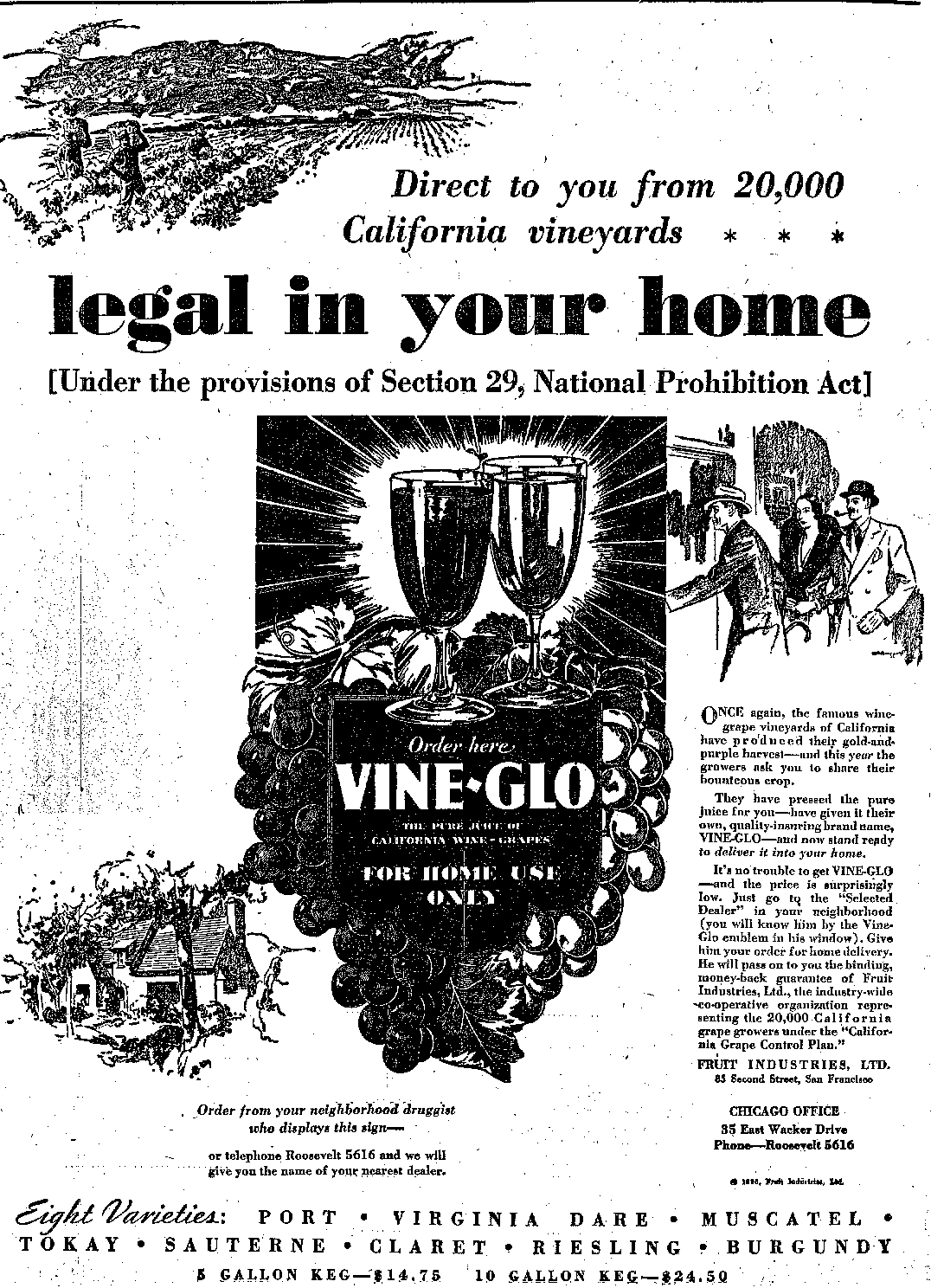
- Advertisement for Vine-Glo in the Chicago Tribune
- Type: Grape concentrate
- Inventor: Joseph Gallo
- Inception: 1929
- Manufacturer: Fruit Industries
- Available: Not available
- Last production year: 1931

Vine-Glo was a grape concentrate brick product sold in the United States during Prohibition by Fruit Industries Ltd, a front for the California Vineyardist Association (CVA), from 1929. It was sold as a grape concentrate to make grape juice from but it apophatically included a warning with instructions on how to make wine from it. Fruit Industries ceased producing it in 1931 following a federal court ruling that making wine from concentrate violated section 29 of the Volstead Act.

== History ==
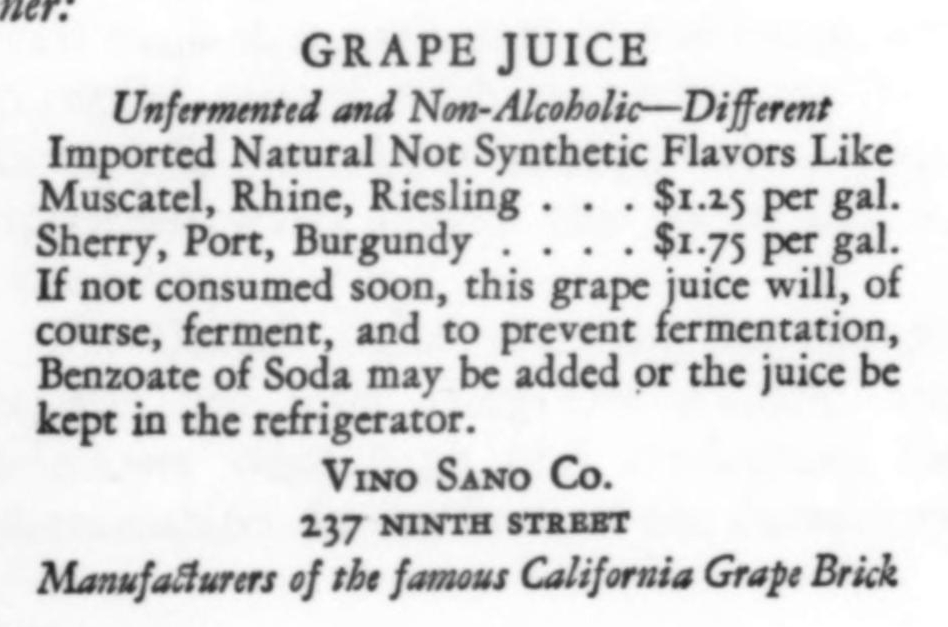
Text of a San Francisco Examiner advertisement for Vine-Glo, advising refrigeration or the addition of sodium benzoate in order "to prevent fermentation"

When Prohibition banned alcohol in the United States under the Volstead Act, it produced a number of loopholes. One under section 29 said that non-alcoholic grape products could still be sold and people could make fruit juices at home from them. The CVA founded Fruit Industries and received a $1,300,000 loan from the Federal Farm Board. Joseph Gallo, father of vintners Ernest and Julio Gallo, invented Vine-Glo as a legal grape concentrate brick and would sell it through Fruit Industries. The product was advertised with tips for preventing alcoholic fermentation, with one salesperson giving customers a very specific warning: "Do not place the liquid in this jug and put it away in the cupboard for twenty-one days, because then it would turn into wine." Fruit Industries also promoted the Farm Board and carried a statement it was "legal in your own home".

When the product went on sale, one million US gallons (38,000 hl) of Vine-Glo were sold with eight wine-flavored varieties created in the first financial year. The product was sold across the United States. When Fruit Industries were trying to launch the product in Chicago in 1930, they published a statement saying that Al Capone had threatened to force them out of Chicago, but they would not be intimidated, and would push on. However, it has been speculated that this was just a promotional tactic. The product eventually went on sale in New York State in 1931.

== Cessation ==
When Vine-Glo was introduced, the drys protested it, but Assistant Attorney General Mabel Walker Willebrandt ruled that it was legal under the Volstead Act, and the Bureau of Prohibition told its agents not to interfere with shipments. By 1931, Fruit Industries produced advertisements asserting that Vine-Glo did not break any laws following constant criticism from dry-supporting communities. When Willebrandt stepped down from the government, she became an attorney for Fruit Industries. This conflict of interest embarrassed the government, which started to treat Vine-Glo in a more hostile manner. Though Fruit Industries got another $1,000,000 loan from the Farm Board in October 1931, a federal judge ruled the same month in United States v. Brunett that grape concentrate could not legally be used to make fruit juice. Fruit Industries ceased making Vine-Glo a month later after the court decision was affirmed by the Director of the Bureau of Prohibition, who said grape concentrate would not be exempt under section 29.
