= Samuel Newitt Wood =

American politician (1825–1891)

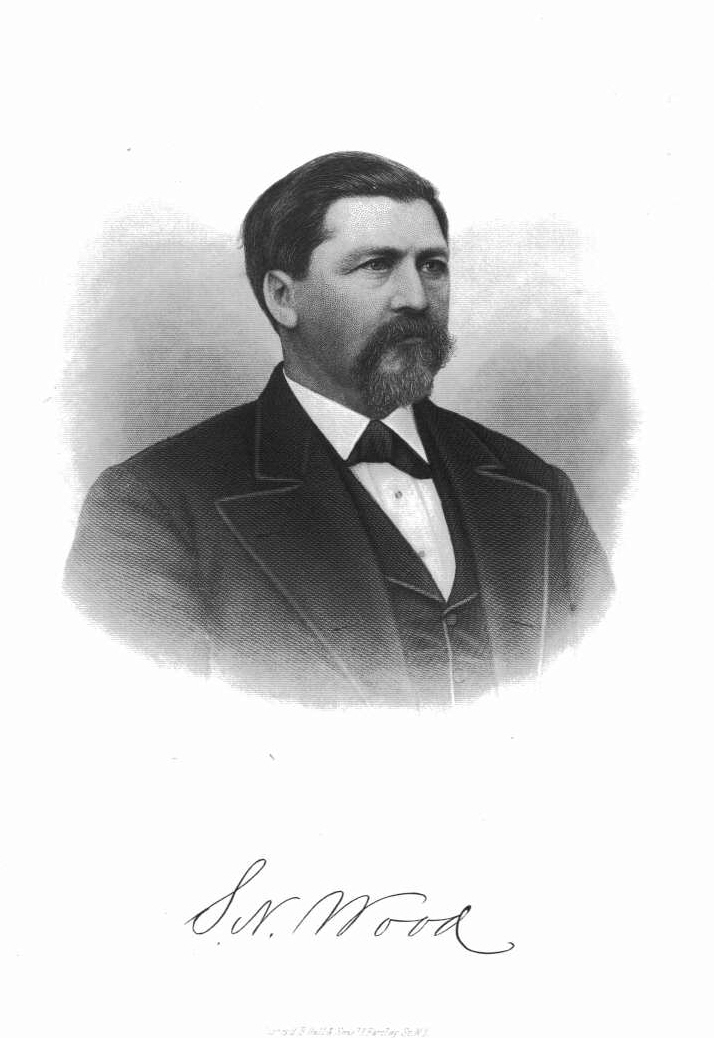

Member of the Kansas Senate from the 26th district
- In office 1876

Member of the Kansas House of Representatives from the 86th district
- In office 1875–1877

Member of the Kansas House of Representatives from the 73rd district
- In office 1871

Member of the Kansas Senate from the 15th district
- In office 1867

Member of the Kansas House of Representatives from the 68th district
- In office 1866

Member of the Kansas House of Representatives from the 69th district
- In office 1864

Member of the Kansas Senate from the 13th district
- In office 1861–1862

Member of the Kansas Territorial Legislature from the combined district of Chase, Morris, and Madison counties
- In office 1860–1861

Personal details
- Born: September 30, 1825 Mount Gilead, Ohio, U.S.
- Died: June 23, 1891 (aged 65) Hugoton, Kansas, U.S.
- Cause of death: Assassination
- Party: Republican
- Nickname: The Fighting Quaker

Military service
- Allegiance: United States of America; Union
- Branch/service: United States Army; Union Army
- Years of service: 1861–1864
- Rank: Brigadier General
- Commands: 2nd Kansas Infantry; Kansas Militia; 6th Missouri Cavalry Regiment (Union)
- Battles/wars: American Civil War; Battle of Wilson's Creek

Samuel Newitt Wood (December 30, 1825 – June 23, 1891) was an American attorney, newspaper editor, and member of the Kansas House of Representatives. He was also a Free State advocate in Kansas and an early supporter of Women's Suffrage. Wood was a speaker at the Pittsburgh, Pennsylvania Convention in 1856 that established the Republican party. He was assassinated in 1891 in a bitter fight over the naming of a new county seat in the state's southwestern corner.

A native of Ohio, Wood settled in Kansas in 1854 following its establishment as a U.S. territory. He represented Chase, Morris, and Madison counties in the Kansas Territorial Legislature in 1860 and 1861. Wood was subsequently elected to the first Kansas State Senate in 1861, the year the state was admitted into the Union, and completed another term as State Senator in 1867. As a member of the House, he served in 1864, 1866, 1876, and 1877, being speaker during his final term. In the 1850s and 1860s, Wood owned and operated several newspapers and was editor of several other Kansas papers in the 1870s and 1880s.

== Early life and family ==
Samuel Newitt Wood was born at Mount Gilead, Ohio, December 30, 1825, fifth child to David and Esther Ward (Mosher) Wood. His paternal grandfather was a leader in the meetings of the Orthodox Quakers until his death. His maternal grandfather became a leader in the more progressive wing of the Society of Friends known as the Hicksites. Having been raised a Quaker, Wood's hatred for slavery grew very strong. His family home was the site of a station on the Underground Railroad. In 1849, during one of his many attempts to carry runaway slaves to freedom, he met his future wife, Margaret Lyon, daughter of William and Elizabeth Lyon. They were married on October 3, 1850. Their children were: David, born August 25, 1851; William Lyon, born March 10, 1853; Florence, born January 20, 1857; Dearie, born July 7, 1865.

== Bleeding Kansas ==
Following the passage of the Kansas-Nebraska Act on May 30, 1854, Samuel moved his family to Lawrence, Kansas. After the murder of Charles Dow on November 21, 1855, Samuel took part in the Rescue of Jacob Branson which occurred on November 26, 1855.

== Newspaper publisher ==
In the 1850s Wood was part owner of the Kansas Tribune of Lawrence. In 1859 he established the first newspapers at Cottonwood Falls, The Kansas Press, and at Council Grove, The Council Grove Press. In the late 1870s, he served as editor of The Kansas Greenbacker of Emporia. He was also associated with The Topeka State Journal, The Woodsdale Democrat, and The Woodsdale Sentinel of Stevens County, Kansas. In 1881 he was editor-in-chief of the Kansas State Journal.

== Military career ==
Wood's service in the Civil War began as captain of Company I (nicknamed the "Kansas Rangers"), 2nd Kansas Infantry, which fought at the Battle of Wilson's Creek. Afterward he was assigned to the 6th Missouri Cavalry Regiment (Union), "Fremont's Battalion", which he had recruited, serving as major and subsequently lieutenant colonel. He fought at the battle near Salem, and formed a part of the command of Maj. Gen. Samuel Curtis in his campaign through Arkansas. In 1864, Wood was appointed brigadier general of the Kansas State Militia.

== Suffrage movements ==
On November 18, 1852, Samuel's mother Esther Ward (Mosher) Wood served as President of the Ohio Women's Rights Convention held at the Presbyterian church in Mount Gilead. The Vice-Presidents were Charlotte Cook and Mrs. A. E. Gurley. Phoebe Spencer was secretary and Mrs. Frances Dana Gage gave an address. On January 21, 1860, S. N. Wood introduced House Bill No.6, entitled "An act to prohibit slavery or involuntary servitude in Kansas", and it was referred to the Committee on Judiciary, of which he was chairman. On February 2 it passed the House by a vote of 30 to 6. On February 11 the Council passed it by a vote of 9 to 4. This bill called out a veto message from Governor Medary of fifteen pages in length; and on February 21 it was passed over his veto by a vote of 30 to 7 in the House, and 9 to 4 in the Council. In 1866, Samuel was one of the leaders who proposed an amendment to the Kansas State Constitution which would strike out the words "male" and "white". On April 2, 1867, Samuel organized the Impartial Suffrage movement in Topeka, Kansas. Through this group he brought in the speakers; Henry B. Blackwell, of New Jersey, Mrs. Lucy Stone, Elizabeth Cady Stanton, Olympia Brown, Bessie Bisbee, and Susan B. Anthony.

== Political career ==
Involved in politics from an early age, Wood was chairman of the Liberty Party's Central Committee in his home county in 1844. He was admitted to the bar in Morrow County, Ohio in 1854 and when the Kansas-Nebraska act was passed, Wood and his family moved to near Lawrence at Wakarusa, Kansas where he joined the Free State Party. He also participated in Jacob Branson's rescue which brought about the short-lived Wakarusa War in 1855. Wood was a delegate to and spoke at the Pittsburgh, Pennsylvania Convention which organized the Republican Party in 1856. He was a delegate to the Leavenworth Constitution Convention in 1858. On July 27, 1861, he was appointed and commissioned by President Abraham Lincoln as [Collector of Customs] at Paso del Norte, New Mexico. He resigned this position at the start of the Civil War. In 1867, Wood was appointed Judge of the 9th Judicial District.

== Stevens County seat war ==
As the founder of Woodsdale, Kansas, Wood strongly advocated for establishing his town as the county seat of Stevens County, which locked him in a contentious battle with the rival town of Hugoton. One of the events in this confrontation was the Hay Meadow Massacre, in which Hugoton supporters disarmed and murdered four Woodsdale supporters. Wood attempted to prosecute the men, but it was ruled that no court had jurisdiction in "No Man's Land" (the Oklahoma Panhandle) where the event took place. Woodsdale is now a ghost town. Nothing of Wood's settlement remains.

== Death ==
As a direct result of the vicious county seat fight, Wood was assassinated outside the Hugoton courthouse on June 23, 1891, by James Brennen. Wood was buried in Prairie Grove Cemetery in Cottonwood Falls. The local prosecutor was County Attorney William O'Connor, who had called for Wood's death. Attorney General John Nutt Ives, an elected Democrat, brought in Charles Curtis, a former Republican prosecutor who would become Vice President of the United States, to act on behalf of the state. His murderer was never prosecuted for the assassination because a jury could not be formed. His brother, Indian Agent, Rev. David John Mosher Wood spoke at his funeral.

== Legacy ==
Woods County, Oklahoma was named in his honor.

== In popular culture ==
The "Song of Samuel Wood" was made and sung in his honor by a Kansas Flint Hills band.
The song “My Great Great Uncle Samuel Newitt Wood” was written and recorded by Steve Hindalong.

== See also ==
- List of assassinated American politicians
