= Harmony Township, Kansas =

Township in Stevens County, Kansas, U.S.

Harmony Township
- Township
- Location within Stevens County
- Coordinates: 37.322808°N 101.447785°W
- Country: United States
- State: Kansas
- County: Stevens

Area
  - Total: 107.985 sq mi (279.68 km^{2})
  - Land: 107.985 sq mi (279.68 km^{2})
  - Water: 0 sq mi (0 km^{2}) 0%

Population (2020)
  - Total: 84
  - Density: 0.78/sq mi (0.30/km^{2})
- Time zone: UTC-6 (CST)
  - Summer (DST): UTC-5 (CDT)
- Area code: 620
- GNIS feature ID: 485072

Harmony Township is a township in Stevens County, Kansas, United States. As of the 2020 census, its population was 84.

== History ==
Three townships were absorbed into Harmony Township in the 1890s: Dermot Township, Moscow Township, and Woodsdale Township. Moscow Township was later reestablished in the 1920s.

== Geography ==
Harmony Township covers an area of 107.985 square miles (279.68 km^{2}), all of it land.

=== Adjacent townships ===
Sullivan Township, Grant County
Big Bow Township, Stanton County	northwest	north
Richfield Township, Morton County	west	self	east	Moscow Township, Stevens County
		south	southeast	Center Township, Stevens County
West Center Township, Stevens County

== Transportation ==
=== Major highways ===
- K-25

== Demographics ==
As of the 2020 census, the township had a population of 84, giving a population density of 0.78 people per square mile (0.30 people/km^{2}). The racial makeup of the township was 86.9% White, 1.2% Native American, 6.0% from some other race, and 6.0% from two or more races. Hispanics or Latinos of any race were 13.1% of the population.

The 2020–2024 American Community Survey estimated that the township contained 19 households and 19 housing units.
