= Hugoton, Kansas =

City in Stevens County, Kansas

- City and County seat
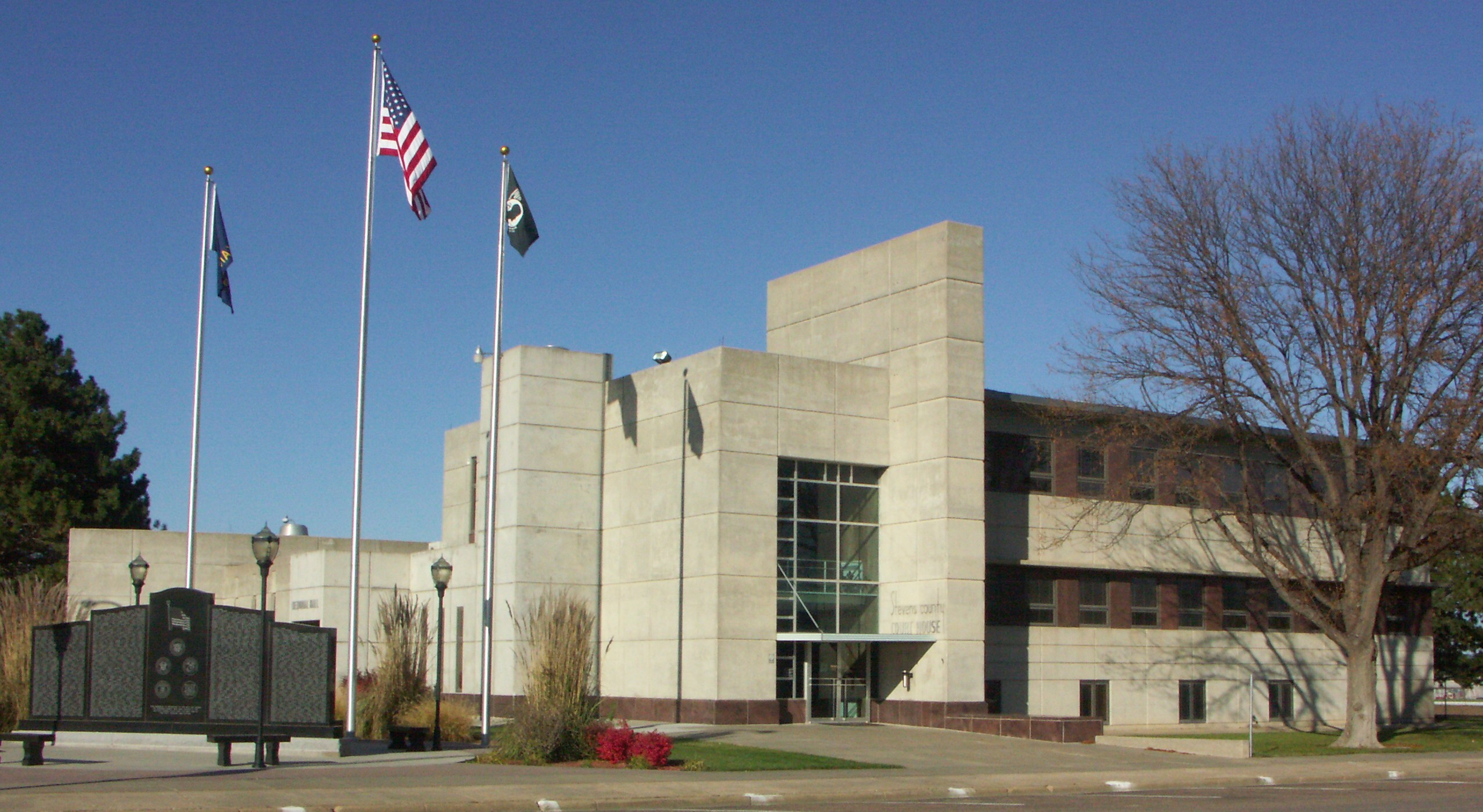
- Stevens County Courthouse (2009)
- Nickname: Natural Gas Capital
- Location within Stevens County and Kansas

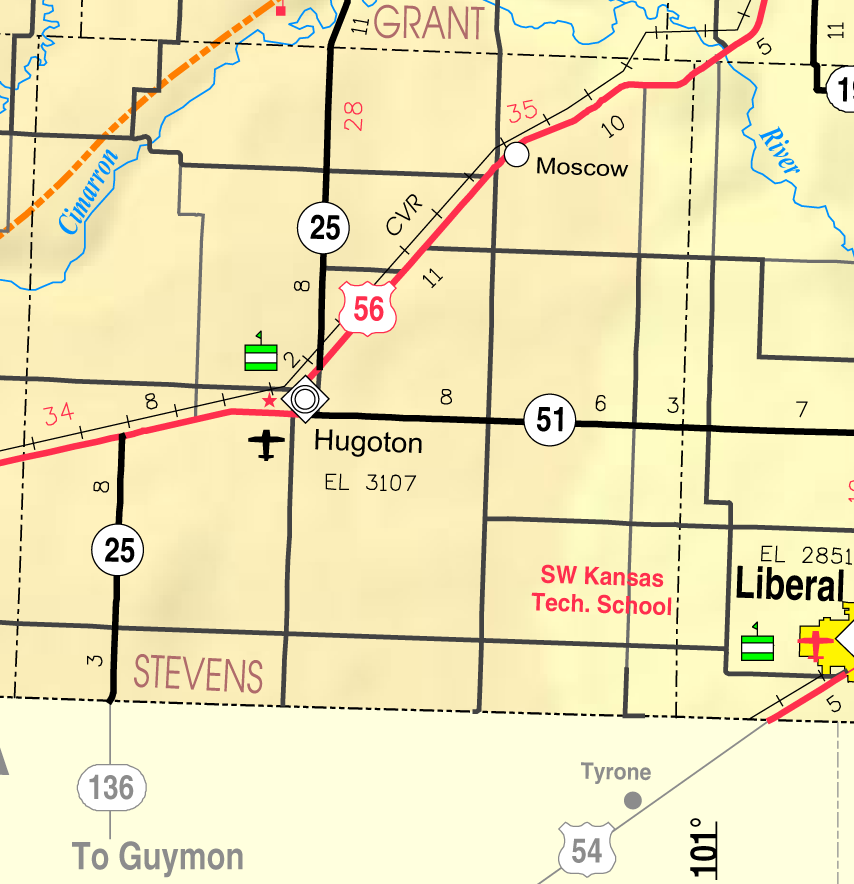
- KDOT map of Stevens County (legend)
- Coordinates: 37°10′28″N 101°20′41″W
- Country: United States
- State: Kansas
- County: Stevens
- Founded: 1885
- Incorporated: 1910
- Named for: Victor Hugo

Government
  - Type: Mayor–Council
  - Mayor: Matthew D. Rome

Area
  - Total: 2.08 sq mi (5.39 km^{2})
  - Land: 2.08 sq mi (5.39 km^{2})
  - Water: 0 sq mi (0.00 km^{2})
- Elevation: 3,107 ft (947 m)

Population (2020)
  - Total: 3,747
  - Density: 1,800/sq mi (695/km^{2})
- Time zone: UTC-6 (CST)
  - Summer (DST): UTC-5 (CDT)
- ZIP Code: 67951
- Area code: 620
- FIPS code: 20-33425
- GNIS ID: 2394441
- Website: cityofhugoton.com

Hugoton (/ˈhjuːɡətən/) is a city in and the county seat of Stevens County, Kansas, United States. As of the 2020 census, the population of the city was 3,747.

== History ==
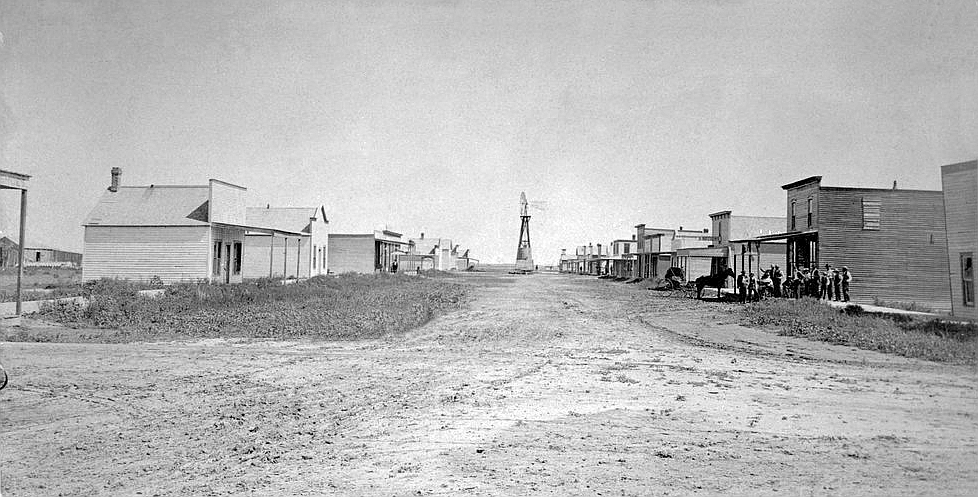
Hugoton, 1891

Settlers from McPherson established a settlement in what was then west-central Seward County in 1885. They originally named this settlement Hugo in honor of French writer Victor Hugo, but then changed its name to Hugoton to distinguish it from Hugo, Colorado. Hugoton's first church, Hugoton United Methodist, was also the first in Stevens County and was founded in 1886; it is still active as of 2019. The first post office in Hugoton was established in April 1886.

In 1886, the Kansas Legislature reestablished the surrounding area as Stevens County, and Gov. John Martin designated Hugoton as the interim county seat. This set off a violent county seat war with nearby Woodsdale. Hugoton became the permanent county seat in 1887, but the conflict continued, culminating in the Hay Meadow Massacre of 1888. Woodsdale founder and attorney Samuel Newitt Wood, heavily invested in the conflict for the county seat, was assassinated by James Brennen, one of the men involved in the Hay Meadow Massacre, outside the Hugoton courthouse on June 23, 1891.

During the 1890s, economic decline drove many residents to leave for newly opened territories in the American Southwest, and the population declined significantly. The Santa Fe Railway reached Hugoton in 1913, which spurred growth. Natural gas was discovered southwest of the city in 1927, leading to the development of the Hugoton Natural Gas Area and the transformation of Hugoton into a major center of natural gas extraction.

Hugoton reportedly served as a temporary home for infamous criminals Bonnie and Clyde. They lived in the unincorporated areas near Hugoton, assuming the aliases of Jewell and Blackie Underwood. Jewell operated a cafe, Jewell's Cafe, and Blackie reportedly worked on area farms. Locals believed they ran a bootlegging operation out of the cafe. Clyde was officially in prison during the time they are claimed to be in the Hugoton area, but locals still insist Jewell and Blackie were Bonnie and Clyde. Receipts from Jewel's Cafe were found in the duo's vehicle after their deaths in a 1934 shoot-out.

In the mid-1930s, Hugoton, along with much of Kansas and parts of other nearby states, suffered the effects of the Dust Bowl, which ravaged the Great Plains in waves between 1934 and 1940. Southwest Kansas was hit particularly hard between 1932 and 1936. The famous "Black Sunday" dust storm that marks the naming of the Dust Bowl as a geographic area encompassing most of the mid-United States and affecting the entire country, hit Hugoton and neighboring towns in multiple counties and in Oklahoma early on April 14, 1935.

== Geography ==
Located in southwestern Kansas at the intersection of U.S. Route 56, K-25, and K-51, Hugoton is approximately 136 miles (219 km) north of Amarillo, 222 miles (357 km) west-southwest of Wichita, and 271 miles (436 km) southeast of Denver.

It lies in the High Plains region of the Great Plains, approximately 11 miles (18 km) southeast of the Cimarron River. It also lies within, and is the namesake of, the Hugoton Natural Gas Area. The Hugoton natural gas field is the largest such field in North America and the second largest in the world.

According to the United States Census Bureau, the city has a total area of 1.75 square miles (4.53 km^{2}), all land.

=== Climate ===
Hugoton has a semi-arid steppe climate (Köppen BSk) with hot, dry summers and cold, dry winters. The hottest temperature recorded in Hugoton was 116 °F (46.7 °C) on June 25, 1911, which along with Clay Center on the same day, is the highest temperature recorded in Kansas in June. Hugoton also holds the state record high for March. The coldest temperature was −22 °F (−30.0 °C) on January 7, 1912.

Climate data for Hugoton, Kansas, 1991–2020 normals, extremes 1904–present
Month	Jan	Feb	Mar	Apr	May	Jun	Jul	Aug	Sep	Oct	Nov	Dec	Year
Record high °F (°C)	82 (28)	88 (31)	104 (40)	100 (38)	104 (40)	116 (47)	110 (43)	114 (46)	107 (42)	97 (36)	90 (32)	84 (29)	116 (47)
Mean maximum °F (°C)	70.1 (21.2)	76.4 (24.7)	83.8 (28.8)	89.9 (32.2)	95.3 (35.2)	101.4 (38.6)	102.9 (39.4)	100.4 (38.0)	97.1 (36.2)	91.5 (33.1)	79.6 (26.4)	69.5 (20.8)	104.1 (40.1)
Mean daily maximum °F (°C)	47.4 (8.6)	51.5 (10.8)	60.6 (15.9)	69.0 (20.6)	78.6 (25.9)	88.3 (31.3)	92.3 (33.5)	89.7 (32.1)	82.9 (28.3)	70.5 (21.4)	57.7 (14.3)	47.1 (8.4)	69.6 (20.9)
Daily mean °F (°C)	33.7 (0.9)	37.1 (2.8)	45.6 (7.6)	54.2 (12.3)	64.4 (18.0)	74.1 (23.4)	78.4 (25.8)	76.3 (24.6)	68.8 (20.4)	56.0 (13.3)	43.5 (6.4)	34.0 (1.1)	55.5 (13.1)
Mean daily minimum °F (°C)	20.1 (−6.6)	22.6 (−5.2)	30.7 (−0.7)	39.4 (4.1)	50.2 (10.1)	59.9 (15.5)	64.6 (18.1)	62.9 (17.2)	54.8 (12.7)	41.6 (5.3)	29.3 (−1.5)	21.0 (−6.1)	41.4 (5.2)
Mean minimum °F (°C)	3.2 (−16.0)	6.9 (−13.9)	13.3 (−10.4)	24.7 (−4.1)	36.4 (2.4)	49.2 (9.6)	56.8 (13.8)	54.8 (12.7)	40.8 (4.9)	25.9 (−3.4)	12.4 (−10.9)	3.5 (−15.8)	−2.3 (−19.1)
Record low °F (°C)	−22 (−30)	−21 (−29)	−5 (−21)	14 (−10)	19 (−7)	38 (3)	42 (6)	38 (3)	24 (−4)	12 (−11)	−8 (−22)	−16 (−27)	−22 (−30)
Average precipitation inches (mm)	0.46 (12)	0.31 (7.9)	1.14 (29)	1.58 (40)	2.18 (55)	3.40 (86)	2.67 (68)	3.17 (81)	1.77 (45)	1.61 (41)	0.51 (13)	0.93 (24)	19.73 (501.9)
Average snowfall inches (cm)	2.9 (7.4)	1.5 (3.8)	2.8 (7.1)	0.5 (1.3)	0.0 (0.0)	0.0 (0.0)	0.0 (0.0)	0.0 (0.0)	0.0 (0.0)	0.1 (0.25)	1.1 (2.8)	4.0 (10)	12.9 (32.65)
Average precipitation days (≥ 0.01 in)	2.0	2.2	3.4	5.1	6.2	6.7	6.4	6.7	4.1	4.1	2.6	2.8	52.3
Average snowy days (≥ 0.1 in)	1.1	1.2	1.0	0.3	0.0	0.0	0.0	0.0	0.0	0.1	0.6	1.2	5.5
Source 1: NOAA
Source 2: National Weather Service

== Demographics ==
Historical population
Census	Pop.	Note	%±
1890	136		—
1900	54		−60.3%
1910	105		94.4%
1920	644		513.3%
1930	1,368		112.4%
1940	1,349		−1.4%
1950	2,781		106.2%
1960	2,912		4.7%
1970	2,739		−5.9%
1980	3,165		15.6%
1990	3,179		0.4%
2000	3,708		16.6%
2010	3,904		5.3%
2020	3,747		−4.0%
U.S. Decennial Census

=== 2020 census ===
As of the 2020 census, Hugoton had a population of 3,747, with 1,355 households and 976 families. The population density was 1,800.6 per square mile (695.2/km^{2}). There were 1,573 housing units at an average density of 755.9 per square mile (291.8/km^{2}).

The median age was 35.1 years. 28.6% of residents were under the age of 18, 8.1% were from 18 to 24, 25.8% were from 25 to 44, 21.9% were from 45 to 64, and 15.5% were 65 years of age or older. For every 100 females there were 98.1 males, and for every 100 females age 18 and over there were 95.1 males age 18 and over.

0.0% of residents lived in urban areas, while 100.0% lived in rural areas.

Of the 1,355 households, 38.1% had children under the age of 18 living in them, 56.1% were married-couple households, 17.6% were households with a male householder and no spouse or partner present, and 22.4% were households with a female householder and no spouse or partner present. About 24.2% of all households were made up of individuals, and 10.7% had someone living alone who was 65 years of age or older. Of the 1,573 housing units, 13.9% were vacant; the homeowner vacancy rate was 2.7% and the rental vacancy rate was 16.8%.

Racial composition as of the 2020 census
Race	Number	Percent
White	2,317	61.8%
Black or African American	18	0.5%
American Indian and Alaska Native	54	1.4%
Asian	22	0.6%
Native Hawaiian and Other Pacific Islander	0	0.0%
Some other race	892	23.8%
Two or more races	444	11.8%
Hispanic or Latino (of any race)	1,672	44.6%

Demographic estimates

The 2016–2020 5-year American Community Survey estimates show that the average household size was 3.1 and the average family size was 3.6. The percent of those with a bachelor's degree or higher was estimated to be 7.0% of the population.

Income and poverty

The 2016–2020 5-year American Community Survey estimates show that the median household income was $56,786 (with a margin of error of +/- $12,361) and the median family income was $61,318 (+/- $8,164). Males had a median income of $35,417 (+/- $6,805) versus $17,364 (+/- $7,595) for females. The median income for those above 16 years old was $26,972 (+/- $4,981). Approximately, 12.7% of families and 19.1% of the population were below the poverty line, including 25.0% of those under the age of 18 and 16.1% of those ages 65 or over.

=== 2010 census ===
As of the 2010 census, there were 3,904 people, 1,413 households, and 993 families residing in the city. The population density was 2,168.9 inhabitants per square mile (837.4/km^{2}). There were 1,560 housing units at an average density of 866.7 per square mile (334.6/km^{2}). The racial makeup of the city was 87.0% White, 0.8% American Indian, 0.3% African American, 0.2% Asian, 10.1% from some other race, and 1.6% from two or more races. Hispanics or Latinos of any race were 36.4% of the population.

There were 1,413 households, of which 40.3% had children under the age of 18 living with them, 57.5% were married couples living together, 4.5% had a male householder with no wife present, 8.2% had a female householder with no husband present, and 29.7% were non-families. 26.8% of all households were made up of individuals, and 11.7% had someone living alone who was 65 years of age or older. The average household size was 2.71, and the average family size was 3.32.

In the city, the population was spread out, with 30.3% under the age of 18, 8.8% from 18 to 24, 25.1% from 25 to 44, 22.4% from 45 to 64, and 13.4% who were 65 years of age or older. The median age was 33.6 years. For every 100 females, there were 98.8 males. For every 100 females age 18 and over, there were 96.3 males age 18 and over.

The median income for a household in the city was $52,161, and the median income for a family was $57,269. Males had a median income of $45,750 versus $33,188 for females. The per capita income for the city was $20,851. About 11.6% of families and 14.8% of the population were below the poverty line, including 22.1% of those under age 18 and 7.6% of those age 65 or over.

== Economy ==
As of 2011, 67.5% of the population over the age of 16 was in the civilian labor force with 64.9% being employed and 2.6% unemployed. The composition, by occupation, of the employed civilian labor force was: 27.2% in management, business, science, and arts; 25.2% in natural resources, construction, and maintenance; 25.0% in sales and office occupations; 14.3% in service occupations; 8.3% in production, transportation, and material moving. The three industries employing the largest percentages of the working civilian labor force were: agriculture, forestry, fishing and hunting, and mining (23.0%); educational services, health care, and social assistance (20.7%); and construction (8.3%).

The cost of living in Hugoton is relatively low; compared to a U.S. average of 100, the cost of living index for the city is 80.5. As of 2011, the median home value in the city was $79,300, the median selected monthly owner cost was $991 for housing units with a mortgage and $445 for those without, and the median gross rent was $628.

== Government ==
Hugoton is a city of the second class with a mayor-council form of government. The city council consists of five members and meets on the first Monday after the 4th day of each month. The mayor and the council members are elected for four-year terms.

As the county seat, Hugoton is the administrative center of Stevens County. The county courthouse is located downtown, and all departments of the county government base their operations in the city.

Hugoton lies within Kansas's 1st U.S. Congressional District. For the purposes of representation in the Kansas Legislature, the city is in the 39th district of the Kansas Senate and the 124th district of the Kansas House of Representatives.

== Education ==
=== Primary and secondary education ===
The community is served by Hugoton USD 210 public school district, which operates five schools in Hugoton:

- Hugoton Primary School (Grades Pre-K-2)
- Hugoton Intermediate School (3-6)
- Hugoton Middle School (7-8)
- Hugoton High School (9-12)
- Hugoton Learning Academy (7-12), charter school

Heritage Christian Academy, a Christian school, offers preschool and classes for grades K-8.

== Transportation ==
U.S. Route 56 and K-25 enter Hugoton concurrently from the north, intersecting K-51, which runs east-west, in the southern part of the city. Both U.S. 56 and K-25 then run concurrently with K-51 to the west.

Hugoton Municipal Airport is located on the south side of U.S. 56 less than a mile west of the city. Publicly owned, it has two paved runways and is used for general aviation.

A line of the Cimarron Valley Railroad passes through the northwestern corner of the city.

== Media ==
The Hugoton Hermes is the city's sole newspaper, published weekly.

Two radio stations are licensed to Hugoton: K222AK, a translator station of NPR affiliate High Plains Public Radio in Garden City, Kansas, broadcasts from Hugoton on 92.3 FM; KFXX-FM broadcasts from Garden City on 106.7 FM, playing a Classic Hits format.

Hugoton is in the Wichita-Hutchinson, Kansas television market.

== Notable people ==
- Billy Drago (1945–2019), actor
- Steve Morris (1946–2025), Kansas Senate president (2005–2013)

== See also ==
- Hay Meadow Massacre
