= Banner Township, Stevens County, Kansas =

Township in Stevens County, Kansas, U.S.

Banner Township
- Township
- Location within Stevens County
- Coordinates: 37.061914°N 101.175768°W
- Country: United States
- State: Kansas
- County: Stevens

Area
  - Total: 106.967 sq mi (277.04 km^{2})
  - Land: 106.967 sq mi (277.04 km^{2})
  - Water: 0 sq mi (0 km^{2}) 0%

Population (2020)
  - Total: 201
  - Density: 1.88/sq mi (0.726/km^{2})
- Time zone: UTC-6 (CST)
  - Summer (DST): UTC-5 (CDT)
- Area code: 620
- GNIS feature ID: 470657

Banner Township is a township in Stevens County, Kansas, United States. As of the 2020 census, its population was 201.

== Geography ==
Banner Township covers an area of 106.967 square miles (277.04 square kilometers).

=== Adjacent townships ===
Center Township, Stevens County
		north
Voorhees Township, Stevens County	west	self	east	Liberal Township, Seward County
		south
Texas County, Oklahoma

== Demographics ==
As of the 2020 census, there were 201 people and 56 households residing in the township. The population density was 7.538 people per square mile (2.910 people/km^{2}). There were 70 housing units. The racial makeup of the township was 81.1% White, 0.5% Black or African American, 3.5% from some other race, and 14.9% from two or more races. Hispanics or Latinos of any race were 12.9% of the population.

There were 56 households: 57.1% were married couples living together, 8.9% were a male householder with no spouse present, and 10.7% were a female householder with no spouse present. The average family size was 4.94 people. 3.4% of people in the township older than 24 had a college degree, and the township had an employment rate of 38.5%.
