= Moscow, Kansas =

City in Stevens County, Kansas

- City
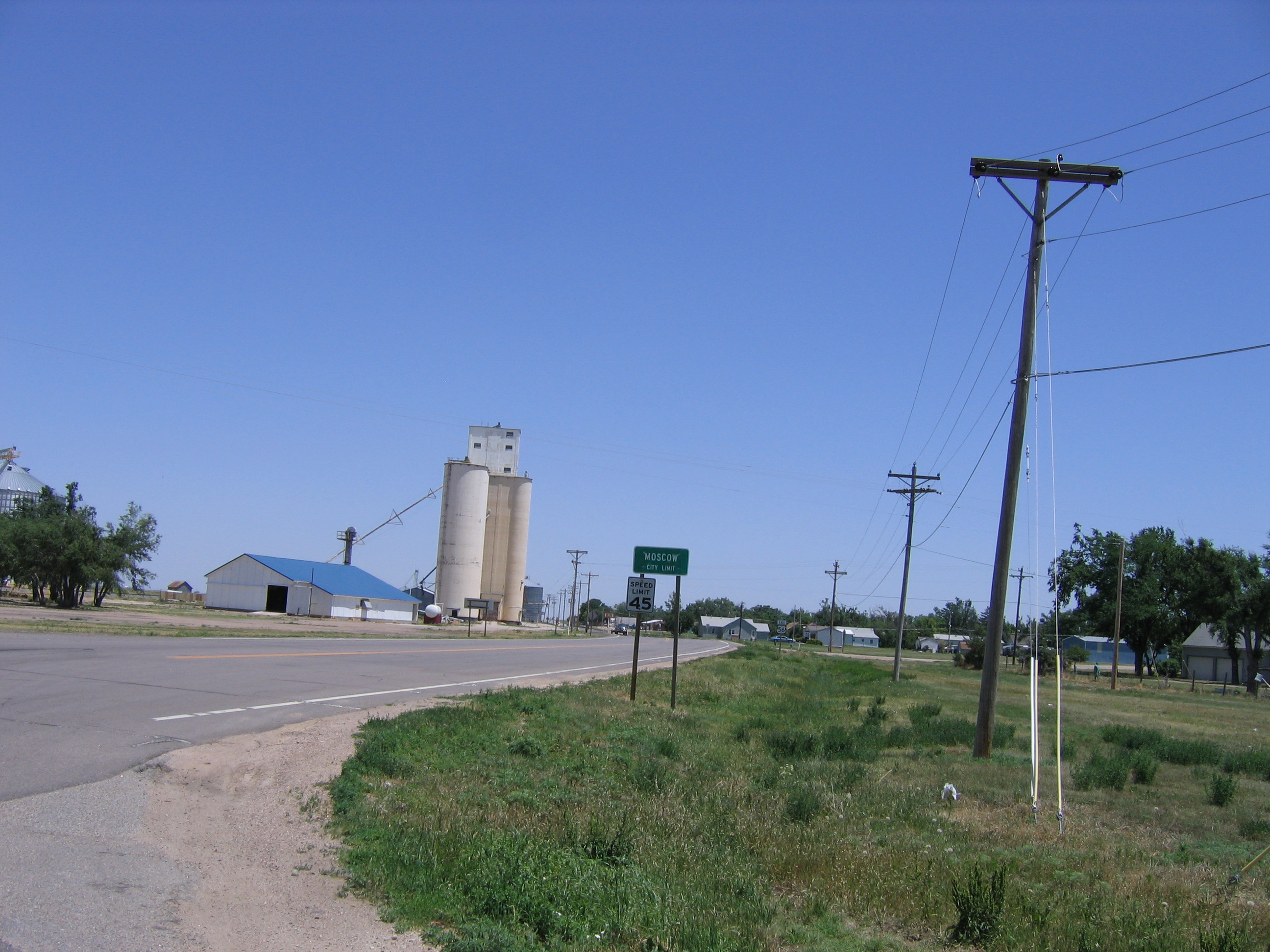
- Moscow (2007)

- Location within Stevens County and Kansas

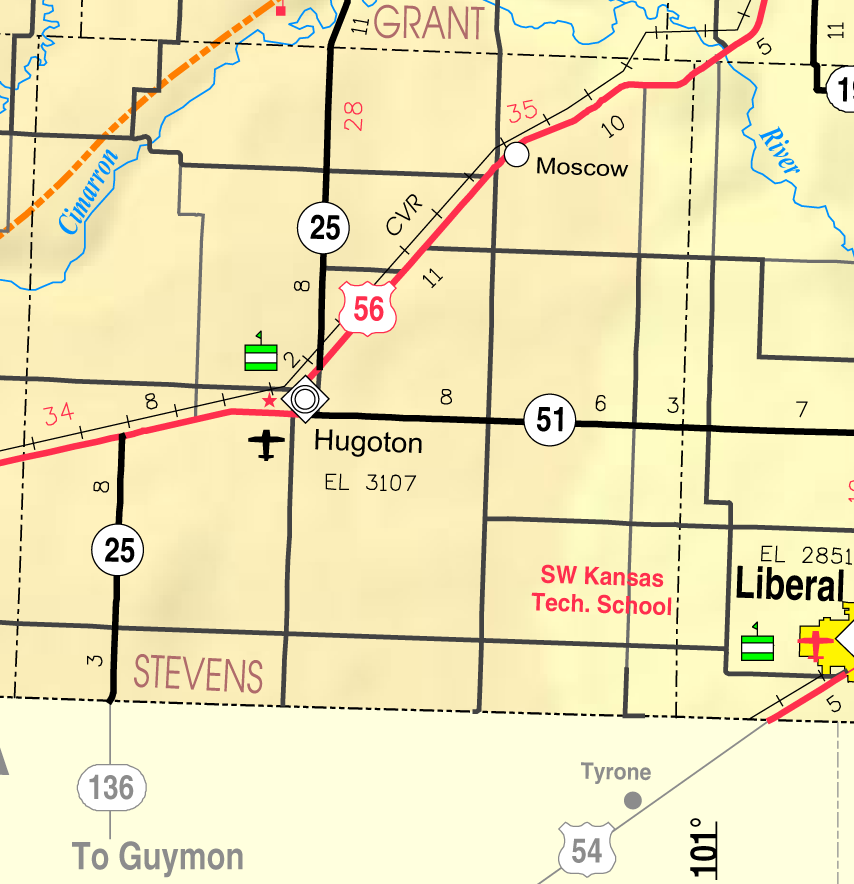
- KDOT map of Stevens County (legend)
- Coordinates: 37°19′30″N 101°12′24″W
- Country: United States
- State: Kansas
- County: Stevens
- Founded: 1887
- Incorporated: 1929

Government
  - Mayor: Billy Bell

Area
  - Total: 0.17 sq mi (0.45 km^{2})
  - Land: 0.17 sq mi (0.45 km^{2})
  - Water: 0 sq mi (0.00 km^{2})
- Elevation: 3,051 ft (930 m)

Population (2020)
  - Total: 272
  - Density: 1,600/sq mi (600/km^{2})
- Time zone: UTC-6 (CST)
  - Summer (DST): UTC-5 (CDT)
- ZIP Code: 67952
- Area code: 620
- FIPS code: 20-48600
- GNIS ID: 2395416
- Website: moscowkansas.com

Moscow (/ˈmɒskoʊ/ MOS-koh) is a city in Stevens County, Kansas, United States. As of the 2020 census, the population of the city was 272.

== History ==
The settlement of Moscow was established in 1887.

One tradition says, the community was named for a member of de Soto's expedition, the maestro de campo (field commander) Luis de Moscoso (the source mistakenly indicates Francisco Coronado southwest expedition, but at this time Moscoso was a member of de Soto's expedition, furthermore he took command of the expedition after de Soto's death). During the settlement name registration there were a series of mistakes. The residents, in their application for a post office, had shortened it to Mosco. A postal clerk in Washington, upon receipt of their petition, being in a helpful spirit, and thinking the hay-seeds in the west did not know their spelling, added a "w" to the name, changing it to Moscow.

The first post office in Moscow was established on April 28, 1888, when it was moved from Valparaiso (now ghost town), which was located approximately 4 miles (6.4 km) southeast of Moscow.

Moscow moved 8 miles to the north in 1913, where in 1912 the CVR railroad was built, so it was also called "New Moscow".

For the first time in the US Census the placename "Moscow" in Stevens County appeared in 1890, though not as a city but as a township. The Census separated city of Moscow in 1930.

== Geography ==
According to the United States Census Bureau, the city has a total area of 0.18 square miles (0.47 km^{2}), all land.

The town is located in southwestern Kansas in the Rolling Cropland and Range region of the Great Plains. The town is in the shape of a right triangle.

The northwestern border of Moscow adjoins U.S. Route 56. The city part of the Route 56 is named Cimarron Avenue, named after the Cimarron River, which is located 7 miles (11 km) north of Moscow.

== Demographics ==
Historical population
Census	Pop.	Note	%±
1930	249		—
1940	177		−28.9%
1950	222		25.4%
1960	211		−5.0%
1970	228		8.1%
1980	228		0.0%
1990	252		10.5%
2000	247		−2.0%
2010	310		25.5%
2020	272		−12.3%
U.S. Decennial Census

=== 2020 census ===
The 2020 United States census counted 272 people, 99 households, and 85 families in Moscow. The population density was 1,581.4 per square mile (610.6/km^{2}). There were 125 housing units at an average density of 726.7 per square mile (280.6/km^{2}). The racial makeup was 65.81% (179) white or European American (54.41% non-Hispanic white), 0.0% (0) black or African-American, 1.47% (4) Native American or Alaska Native, 0.0% (0) Asian, 0.0% (0) Pacific Islander or Native Hawaiian, 15.44% (42) from other races, and 17.28% (47) from two or more races. Hispanic or Latino of any race was 40.81% (111) of the population.

Of the 99 households, 48.5% had children under the age of 18; 56.6% were married couples living together; 18.2% had a female householder with no spouse or partner present. 9.1% of households consisted of individuals and 4.0% had someone living alone who was 65 years of age or older. The average household size was 3.9 and the average family size was 3.6. The percent of those with a bachelor's degree or higher was estimated to be 3.7% of the population.

28.7% of the population was under the age of 18, 10.3% from 18 to 24, 23.5% from 25 to 44, 24.6% from 45 to 64, and 12.9% who were 65 years of age or older. The median age was 35.0 years. For every 100 females, there were 110.9 males. For every 100 females ages 18 and older, there were 102.1 males.

The 2016–2020 5-year American Community Survey estimates show that the median household income was $52,222 (with a margin of error of +/- $40,297) and the median family income was $48,056 (+/- $29,581). Males had a median income of $36,765 (+/- $10,183) versus $23,750 (+/- $13,078) for females. The median income for those above 16 years old was $31,688 (+/- $8,946). Approximately, 12.5% of families and 17.3% of the population were below the poverty line, including 18.4% of those under the age of 18 and 6.5% of those ages 65 or over.

=== 2010 census ===
As of the census of 2010, there were 310 people, 105 households, and 85 families residing in the city. The population density was 1,722.2 inhabitants per square mile (664.9/km^{2}). There were 119 housing units at an average density of 661.1 per square mile (255.3/km^{2}). The racial makeup of the city was 73.2% White, 3.5% Native American, 21.3% from other races, and 1.9% from two or more races. Hispanic or Latino of any race were 38.7% of the population.

There were 105 households, of which 45.7% had children under the age of 18 living with them, 68.6% were married couples living together, 8.6% had a female householder with no husband present, 3.8% had a male householder with no wife present, and 19.0% were non-families. 14.3% of all households were made up of individuals, and 5.7% had someone living alone who was 65 years of age or older. The average household size was 2.95 and the average family size was 3.31.

The median age in the city was 32.5 years. 31% of residents were under the age of 18; 8.7% were between the ages of 18 and 24; 29% were from 25 to 44; 19.7% were from 45 to 64; and 11.6% were 65 years of age or older. The gender makeup of the city was 46.5% male and 53.5% female.

== Education ==
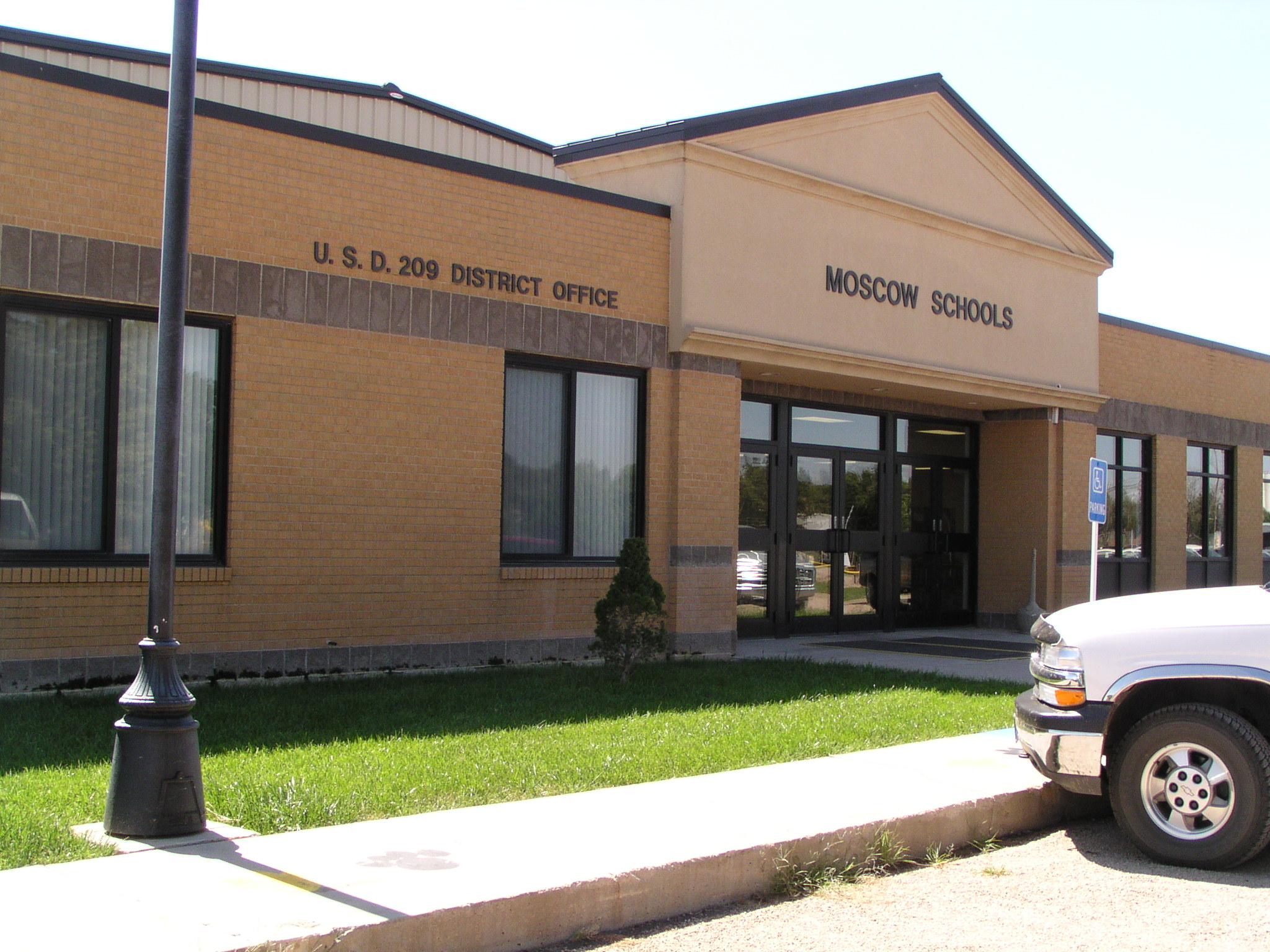
Moscow High School (2005)

=== Primary and secondary education ===
The community is served by Moscow USD 209 public school district, and contains two schools:

- Moscow Elementary School (pre-K to Sixth grade)
- Moscow High School (Seventh grade to Twelfth grade)

The emblem of the High school is the Wildcat, so students are also called Moscow Wildcats.

The Moscow Wildcats won the Kansas State High School 8-Man football championship in 1978.

== Infrastructure ==
=== Transportation ===
The northwestern border of Moscow adjoins U.S. Route 56.

The Cimarron Valley Railroad (CVR) parallels Route 56 and crosses the county from northeast to southwest. CVR is one of several short-line railroads operated by The Western Group.

The Brollier Airport is located east of Moscow. GNIS feature ID 481338.
