= Hay Meadow massacre =

- The site of the massacre
- Date: July 25, 1888
- Location: Wild Horse Lake, Oklahoma, USA
- Deaths: 4

The Hay Meadow massacre occurred on July 25, 1888, and was the most violent event of the Stevens County War in Kansas.

In July 1888, Sam Robinson, the marshal of Hugoton, and a group of men supporting Hugoton for the county seat planned an outing in No Man's Land just south of the county. Ed Short, the marshal of Woodsdale and a Woodsdale supporter, learned of the outing and gathered some men of the opposing faction. They caught up with Robinson, but he escaped. Short, feeling they needed more help, sent for reinforcements. Sheriff John M. Cross, also a Woodsdale booster, and four others headed out to search for the Hugoton party. Not finding them, they camped for the night on a hay meadow at Wild Horse Lake, just across the border in the present-day Oklahoma.

Meanwhile, Robinson's friends had organized a group of Hugoton supporters with the intentions of rescuing him. They met Robinson and returned to the strip. Locating the Woodsdale camp at the hay meadow, they surrounded the Sheriff's party, killed four members, and injured the fifth. The Hugoton party, believing they had killed all of the Woodsdale group, returned, saying that they had killed the party in a shootout. However, the surviving member and a group of haymakers who witnessed the event stated that the Woodsdale party had been captured, disarmed, and then executed.

The state militia was called out and the Hugoton men arrested, but it was soon determined that no court had jurisdiction in No Man's Land. Eventually, the case was tried before the United States Court for the Eastern District of Texas, at Paris (United States v. C. E. Cook. Orin Cook, Capt. C.E. Frease, Johnnie Jackson, Ed Boudin, John Colbert, et al.). Samuel Newitt Wood was the lead prosecutor. Seven men were convicted of murder and sentenced to death. On appeal, however, the Supreme Court held that the Paris court had no jurisdiction, and no sentence was carried out.

== See also ==
- County seat war
- American Frontier

== Sources ==
- Butler, Ken. Kansas Blood Spilled Into Oklahoma. Blue Skyways (retrieved August 19, 2006)
- Mason, Henry F. "County Seat Controversies in Southwestern Kansas" The Kansas Historical Quarterly 2:1 (February 1933) 45–65. (retrieved from The Kansas Collection August 19, 2006)
- Williams, Robert L. "Judge Jesse James Dunn 1867-1926", Chronicles of Oklahoma 18:1 (March 1940) 3-11 (retrieved August 19, 2006)
