= Center Township, Stevens County, Kansas =

Township in Stevens County, Kansas, U.S.

Center Township
- Township
- Location within Stevens County
- Coordinates: 37.17736°N 101.224453°W
- Country: United States
- State: Kansas
- County: Stevens

Area
  - Total: 107.998 sq mi (279.71 km^{2})
  - Land: 107.998 sq mi (279.71 km^{2})
  - Water: 0 sq mi (0 km^{2}) 0%

Population (2020)
  - Total: 4,148
  - Density: 38.41/sq mi (14.83/km^{2})
- Time zone: UTC-6 (CST)
  - Summer (DST): UTC-5 (CDT)
- Area code: 620
- GNIS feature ID: 470629

Center Township is a township in Stevens County, Kansas, United States. As of the 2020 census, its population was 4,148.

== History ==
Two townships were absorbed into Center Township in the 1890s: Cleveland Township and Lincoln Township.

== Geography ==
Center Township covers an area of 107.998 square miles (279.71 square kilometers).

=== Communities ===
- part of Hugoton

=== Adjacent townships ===
Moscow Township, Stevens County
Harmony Township, Stevens County	northwest	north
West Center Township, Stevens County	west	self	east	Liberal Township, Seward County
Voorhees Township, Stevens County	southwest	south
Banner Township, Stevens County

== Transportation ==
=== Major highways ===
- US-56
- K-25
- K-51

== Demographics ==
As of the 2020 census, there were 4,148 people and 1,518 households residing in the township. The population density was 38.41 people per square mile (14.83 people/km^{2}). There were 1,745 housing units. The racial makeup of the township was 81.1% White, 1.3% Native American, 0.5% Asian, 0.5% Black or African American, 22.7% from some other race, and 11.6% from two or more races. Hispanics or Latinos of any race were 63.4% of the population.

There were 1,518 households: 43.1% were married couples living together, 28.4% were a male householder with no spouse present, and 20.6% were a female householder with no spouse present. The average family size was 3.53 people. 27.6% of people in the township older than 24 had a college degree, and the township had an employment rate of 59.5%.
