= Hugoton Municipal Airport =

- IATA: none; ICAO: KHQG; FAA LID: HQG

Summary
- Airport type: Public
- Owner: Stevens County
- Serves: Hugoton, Kansas
- Elevation AMSL: 3,134 ft (955 m)
- Coordinates: 37°09′47″N 101°22′14″W
- Interactive map of Hugoton Municipal Airport

Runways
Direction	Length		Surface
Direction	ft	m	Surface
2/20	5,000	1,524	Concrete
13/31	2,627	801	Asphalt

Statistics (2007)
- Aircraft operations: 10,000
- Based aircraft: 18
- Source: Federal Aviation Administration

Hugoton Municipal Airport (ICAO: KHQG, FAA LID: HQG) is a county-owned public-use airport located two nautical miles (3.7 km) southwest of the central business district of Hugoton, a city in Stevens County, Kansas, United States.

Although most U.S. airports use the same three-letter location identifier for the FAA and IATA, this airport is assigned HQG by the FAA but has no designation from the IATA.

== Facilities and aircraft ==
Hugoton Municipal Airport covers an area of 214 acres (87 ha) at an elevation of 3,134 feet (955 m) above mean sea level. It has two runways: 2/20 is 5,000 by 75 feet (1,524 x 23 m) with a concrete surface; 13/31 is 2,627 by 60 feet (801 x 18 m) with an asphalt surface.

For the 12-month period ending August 22, 2007, the airport had 10,000 general aviation aircraft operations, an average of 27 per day. At that time there were 18 aircraft based at this airport: 83% single-engine, 11% multi-engine, and 6% ultralight.

== Incidents and accidents ==
In 1952, a Braniff Airways Douglas DC-4 with an uncontrollable engine fire made a successful emergency landing at Hugoton Municipal Airport. Minor injuries were reported among the 45 passengers and three crew members. The DC-4 was destroyed by fire after the successful landing. Captain Stanford was praised for his quick actions and judgement.

== See also ==
- List of airports in Kansas
