= 6th Missouri Cavalry Regiment =

- Active: 14 Feb. 1862 – 12 Sept. 1865
- Country: United States
- Allegiance: (United States) Union; Missouri
- Branch: Union Army
- Type: Cavalry
- Size: Regiment
- Engagements: Battle of Pea Ridge; Battle of Prairie Grove (2nd Battalion); Battle of Chickasaw Bayou; Battle of Arkansas Post; Yazoo Pass Expedition; Battle of Champion Hill (7 companies); Siege of Vicksburg, May 19 & May 22 assaults (7 companies); Battle of Devil's Backbone (detachment); Bayou Teche Campaign; Red River Campaign

Commanders
- Notable commanders: Clark Wright; Samuel Newitt Wood

The 6th Missouri Cavalry Regiment was a cavalry regiment that served in the Union Army during the American Civil War. The regiment was organized in February 1862 by merging three independent cavalry battalions.

== Formation ==
The 6th Missouri Cavalry Regiment was formed on 14 February 1862 by combining the battalions of Major Clark Wright, Major Samuel Newitt Wood, and Captain Henry D. Hawkins. The original field officers were Colonel Wright, Lieutenant Colonel Wood, and Majors Hawkins and Samuel Montgomery. The surgeon was James L. Kiernan and the chaplain was William Denby. Wood resigned on 12 August 1862 and was replaced as lieutenant colonel the following day by T. A. Switzler. Hawkins resigned on 5 May 1863 and was replaced as major the next day by Bacon Montgomery.

Original Company Officers, 6th Missouri Cavalry Regiment
Company	Captain	To Rank From
A	T. A. Switzler	5 July 1861
B	William M. Hackney	22 December 1861
C	Bacon Montgomery	10 February 1862
D	William H. Crockett	1 September 1861
E	Austin Hubbard	30 April 1862
F	Daniel D. Emmans	16 February 1862
G	Sidney A. Breese	9 January 1862
H	Francis J. Hopper	28 December 1861
I	Thomas J. Spillman	1 March 1862
K	Jacob C. DeGross	15 February 1862
L	Jesse C. Kirby	30 September 1862

== Service ==
The regiment was attached to District of Southwest Missouri, Department of the Missouri, to July 1862. District of Eastern Arkansas, Department of the Missouri, to December 1862. 1st Brigade, 3rd Cavalry Division, District of Eastern Arkansas, to January 1863 (6 companies). 1st Brigade, 2nd Cavalry Division, XIII Corps, Department of the Tennessee, to April 1863 (6 companies). Headquarters, XIII Corps, Army of the Tennessee, to August 1863 (6 companies). Cavalry Brigade, XIII Corps, Department of the Gulf, to November 1863 (6 companies). 3rd Brigade, Cavalry Division, Department of the Gulf, to January 1864 (7 companies). 1st Brigade, Cavalry Division, Department of the Gulf, to December 1864. District of Southern Alabama, Department of the Gulf, to February 1865. Separate Brigade, District of Baton Rouge, Louisiana, Department of the Gulf, February 1865 (7 companies). Cavalry Brigade, District of Baton Rouge, Louisiana, to July 1865. Department of Texas to September, 1865.

Companies A, D, E, and L attached to District of Southwest Missouri, Department of the Missouri, to October 1862. 2nd Brigade, 2nd Division, Army of the Frontier, Department of the Missouri, to June 1863. District of Southeast Missouri, Department of the Missouri, to October 1863. District of St. Louis, Missouri, Department of the Missouri, to September 1865.

The 6th Missouri Cavalry mustered out of service on September 12, 1865.

== Detailed service ==
Curtis' Campaign in southwest Missouri and Arkansas February–March 1862. Marshfield, Mo., February 9. Sugar Creek, Ark., February 17. Bentonville February 17. West Plains, Mo., February 19. Keytesville February 25. Battles of Pea Ridge, Ark., March 6–8. Spring River March 13. Salem Spring River March 18 (detachment). Scout through Gadfly, Newtonia, Granby, Neosho, and Valley of Indian Creek and skirmish April 8. Scout from Batesville, Ark., June 16–17 (4 companies). White Oak Bayou, Miss., June 23 (battalion). Near Fayetteville, Ark., July 15. Expedition to Coldwater, Miss., July 22–25 (battalion). White Oak Bayou, Miss., July 29 (battalion). Chariton Bridge, Mo., August 3. Montevallo August 7. Between Stockton and Humansville August 12. Stockton August 12. Neosho August 21. Hickory Grove August 23 (Company B). Expedition from Clarendon, Ark., to Lawrenceville and St. Charles September 11–13. Occupation of Newtonia, Mo., October 4 (2nd Battalion). Expedition from Helena, Ark., to Grenada, Miss.. November 27-December 5. Oakland, Miss., December 3. Cane Hill, Boston Mountains, Ark. (2nd Battalion). Battle of Prairie Grove, Ark., December 7 (2nd Battalion). Near Helena, Ark., December 14 (Company E). Sherman's Yazoo Expedition December 20, 1862 – January 3, 1863. Expedition from Milliken's Bend to Dallas Station and Delhi December 25–26, 1862. Expedition over Boston Mountains to Van Buren, Ark., December 27–29 (2nd Battalion). Reconnaissance toward White River and St. Charles January 13, 1863 (squadron). Carthage January 23, 1863. Expedition from Young's Point, La., to Greenville, Miss., and Cypress Bend, Ark., February 14–29. Cypress Bend, Ark., February 19 (detachment). Fish Lake, near Greenville, Miss., and Deer Creek, near Greenville, February 23 (detachment). Operations from Milliken's Bend, La., to New Carthage March 31-April 17 (1st Battalion). Near Dunbar's Plantation, Bayou Vidal, April 7 (detachment). Movement on Bruinsburg and turning Grand Gulf April 25–30. Port Gibson May 1. Near Black River May 5. Raid on New Orleans & Jackson Railroad, near Crystal Springs, May 11. Jackson May 14. Champion Hill May 16. Near Bridgeport May 17. Siege of Vicksburg May 18-July 4. Assaults on Vicksburg May 19 and 22. Mason's Ford. Big Black River, June 9. Advance on Jackson, Miss., July 4–10. Near Baker's Creek July 7. Bolton's Station July 8 (detachment). Near Clinton July 8 (detachment). Near Jackson and near Clinton July 9 (detachment). Siege of Jackson July 10–17. Brookhaven July 18 (detachment). Near Morganza, La., September 8. Atchafalaya September 8–9. Hornersville, Mo., September 20 (2nd Battalion). Sterling's Farm, on Bayou Fordoche, near Morganza, September 27. Western Louisiana Campaign October 3-November 30. Reconnaissance toward Opelousas October 20. Opelousas, Barre Landing, October 21. Washington October 24. Bayou Bourbeaux November 2. Carrion Crow Bayou November 18. Bayou Portage, Grand Lake, November 23. Attack on Bloomfield, Mo., and pursuit to Brown's Ferry November 29–30 (2nd Battalion). Near Vermillionville, La., November 30. Branchville, Ark, January 17, 1864 (detachment). Branchville, Ivey's Ford, Pine Bluff, January 19 (detachment). Red River Campaign March 10-May 22. Advance from Franklin to Alexandria March 14–26. Bayou Rapides March 20. Henderson's Hill March 21. Monett's Ferry and Cloutiersville March 29–30. Natchitoches March 31. Crump's Hill, Piney Woods, April 2. Wilson's Farm April 7. Bayou de Paul, Carroll's Mill, April 8. Battle of Sabine Cross Roads April 8. Pleasant Hill April 9. About Cloutiersville April 22–24. Bayou Rapides Bridge and McNutt's Hill, Alexandria, April 27–28. Scout from Pilot Knob, Mo., to Gainesville, Ark., May 10–25 (2nd Battalion). Retreat to Morganza April 13–20. Wilson's Landing May 14. Avoyelle's (or Marksville Prairie) May 15. Old River L May 22. Operations in southeast Missouri and northeast Arkansas July 18-August 6 (2nd Battalion). Mazzard's Prairie, Ark., July 27. Osceola August 2 and 4. Elkchute August 4. Bayou Letsworth August 11. Operations in southwest Missouri and northwest Arkansas August 15–24 (2nd Battalion). Richland Creek, Ark., August 16 (detachment). Expedition to Clinton, La., August 23–29. Olive Branch, Corelle River and Clinton August 25. Near Richwood's, Mo., October 4 (detachment). Tyler's Mills October 7 (2nd Battalion). Expedition from Baton Rouge to Clinton, Greensburg, Osyke, and Camp Moore October 5–9. Expedition from Baton Rouge to Brookhaven, Miss., and skirmishes November 14–21. Davidson's Expedition from Baton Rouge against Mobile & Ohio Railroad November 27-December 3. Expedition from Baton Rouge to Clinton and Comite River March 30-April 2, 1865. Duty in District of Baton Rouge, La., until July and the Department of Texas until September.

== Casualties ==
The regiment lost a total of 315 men during service; 2 officers and 34 enlisted men killed or mortally wounded, 6 officers and 273 enlisted men died of disease.

== Commanders ==
- Colonel Clark Wright
- Colonel Samuel Newitt Wood
- Major Samuel Montgomery - commanded 2nd Battalion at the battle of Prairie Grove

== See also ==
- Missouri Civil War Union units
- Missouri in the Civil War
