= Volstead Act =

1919 US law initiating the prohibition of alcoholic beverages

National Prohibition Act
- Other short titles: War Prohibition Act
- Long title: An Act to prohibit intoxicating beverages, and to regulate the manufacture, production, use, and sale of high-proof spirits for other than beverage purposes, and to insure an ample supply of alcohol and promote its use in scientific research and in the development of fuel, dye, and other lawful industries
- Acronyms (colloquial): NPA
- Nicknames: Volstead Act
- Enacted by: the 66th United States Congress
- Effective: October 28, 1919 and January 17, 1920

Citations
- Public law: Pub. L. 66–66
- Statutes at Large: 41 Stat. 305–323, ch. 85

Legislative history
- Introduced in the House as H.R. 6810 by Andrew Volstead (R–MN) on June 27, 1919; Committee consideration by House Judiciary Committee; Passed the House on July 22, 1919 (295–105, 3 Present); Passed the Senate with amendment on September 5, 1919 (Voice vote); Reported by the joint conference committee on October 6, 1919; agreed to by the Senate on October 8, 1919 (Voice vote) and by the House on October 10, 1919 (230–69, 1 Present); Vetoed by President Woodrow Wilson on October 27, 1919; Overridden by the House on October 27, 1919 (210–73, 3 Present); Overridden by the Senate and became law on October 28, 1919 (65–20)

United States Supreme Court cases
- Jacob Ruppert v. Caffey, 251 U.S. 264 (1920)

The National Prohibition Act, commonly known as the Volstead Act, was an act of the 66th United States Congress designed to execute the 18th Amendment (ratified January 1919) which established the prohibition of alcoholic drinks. The Anti-Saloon League's Wayne Wheeler conceived and drafted the bill, which was named after Andrew Volstead, chairman of the House Judiciary Committee, who managed the legislation.

== Historical context ==
The Volstead Act had a number of contributing factors that led to its ratification in 1919. For example, the formation of the Anti-Saloon League in 1893. The league used the after effects of World War I to push for national prohibition, exploiting widespread prejudice towards and suspicion of foreigners during and following the war. Many reformers took advantage of the situation to get measures passed, a major example of which was national prohibition. The league was successful in getting many states to ban alcohol prior to 1917 by claiming that to drink was to be pro-German, which succeeded in part because many of the major breweries at the time had German names. Additionally, many saloons were immigrant-dominated which further supported the narrative that the Anti-Saloon League was pushing for. Another factor that led to the passage of the Volstead Act was the idea that in order to feed the allied nations there was a greater need for the grain that was being used to make whiskey. Prohibitionists also argued that the manufacture and transportation of liquor was taking away from the needed resources that were already scarce going into WWI. They argued that Congress would have conserved food and coal much earlier had not liquor interests been placed above public welfare. This led to the War Time Prohibition Act in 1918. The case for wartime prohibition was strong, and the prohibitionists could use their early successes under the necessities of mobilization to make the change permanent through a constitutional amendment in 1919.

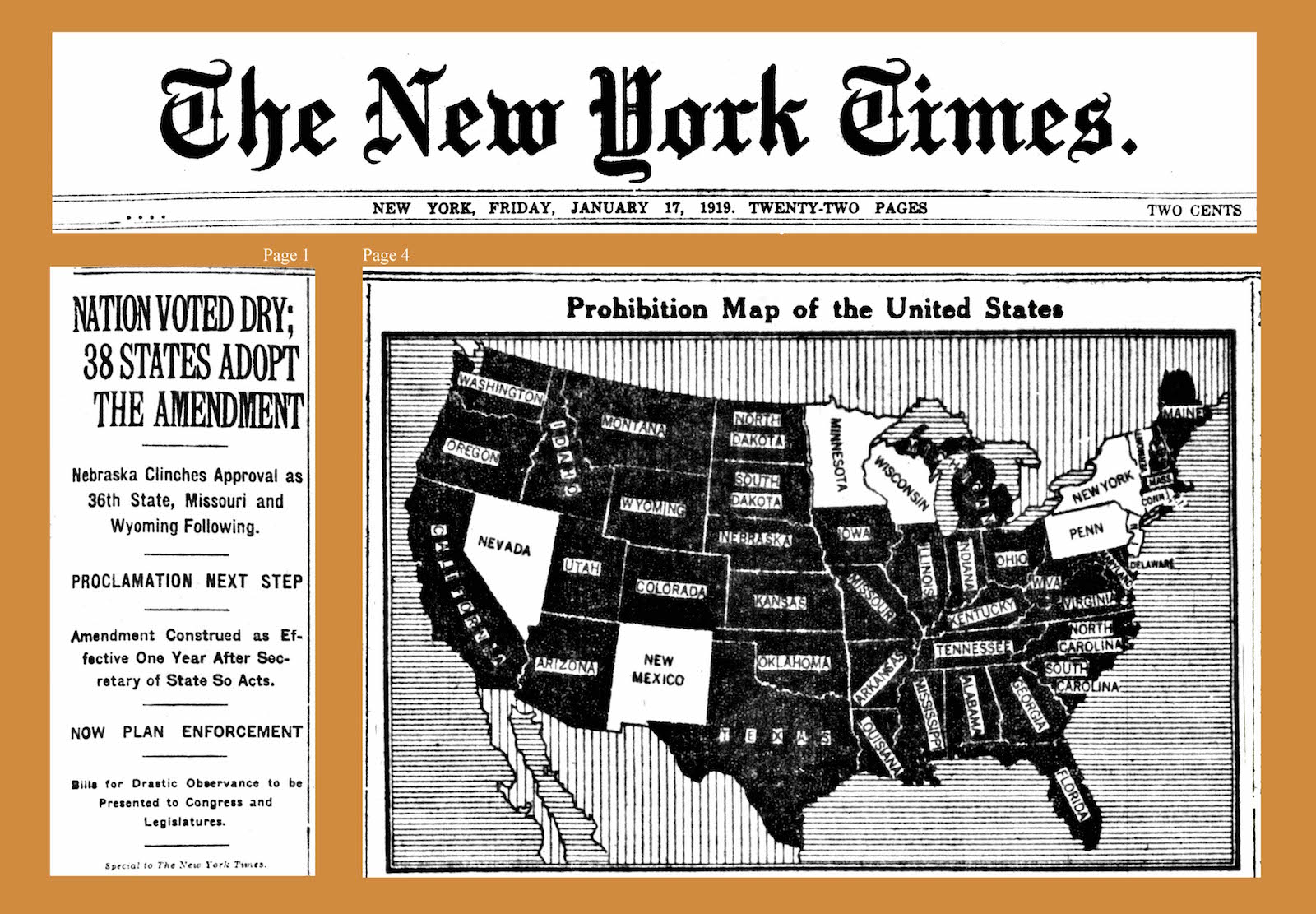

== Passage of the Volstead Act ==
H.R. 6810, was the full name given to the National Prohibition Act, which in short meant, "An act to prohibit intoxicating beverages, and to regulate the manufacture, production, and sale of high-proof spirits for other than beverage purposes, and to ensure an ample supply of alcohol and promote its use in scientific research and in the development of fuel, dye, and other lawful industries." Prohibition was originally proposed by a man by the name of Richmond Hobson, and the proposition was brought to Congress as an amendment to the Constitution. Later, attorney Wayne Wheeler proposed the first version of the bill, which Congress amended many times. President Woodrow Wilson vetoed the bill, Congress overrode his veto, and the bill went through on October 28, 1919. The Volstead Act went into play on January 16, 1920, where it became a challenge for the United States Supreme Court to navigate through. The Volstead Act was presented to help promote the togetherness of federal and state legislation in regulating alcohol.

== Content of the Volstead Act ==
The Volstead Act consisted of three main sections: (1) previously enacted war Prohibition, (2) Prohibition as designated by the Eighteenth Amendment, and (3) industrial alcohol use. Before the ratification of the Eighteenth Amendment, the War Time Prohibition Act was approved on November 21, 1918. This was passed to conserve grain by prohibiting its usage in the production of spirits. Title II of the Volstead Act, "Permanent National Prohibition," which was defined as "intoxicating beverages" containing greater than 0.5 percent alcohol. This section also set forth the fines and jail sentences for the manufacture, sale and movement of alcoholic beverages, as well as set forth regulations that described those who would enforce the laws, what search and seizure powers law enforcement had or did not have, as well as how adjunction of violations would be in place, among many others. Despite these strict laws on alcohol commerce, there were numerous ways in which the possession and personal use of alcohol remained legal under the Volstead Act. It was in fact legal to own alcoholic beverages that were obtained before the Prohibition, as well as serve these types of drinks to family or guests in the home with proof of purchase on hand. This allowed numerous individuals, specifically those who were wealthy to stockpile these beverages before Prohibition. Alcohol that was used for medical purposes remained legal under the Volstead Act. Physicians were limited on what they could prescribe their patients. They were allowed one pint of spirits every ten days, a restriction the American Medical Associate opposed for being inadequate. Pastors, priests, ministers, rabbis and others who practiced religious actions could acquire a permit to provide alcohol for sacramental purposes only. Alcohol for any industrial purposes was allowed in Title III of the Volstead Act, titled "Industrial Purposes."

== Enforcement and impact ==
The production, importation, and distribution of alcoholic beverages—once the province of legitimate business—was taken over by criminal gangs, which fought each other for market control in violent confrontations, including murder. Major gangsters, such as Omaha's Tom Dennison and Chicago's Al Capone, became rich, and were admired locally and nationally. Enforcement was difficult because the gangs became so rich that they were often able to bribe underpaid and understaffed law-enforcement personnel, and afford expensive lawyers. Many citizens were sympathetic to bootleggers, and respectable citizens were lured by the romance of illegal speakeasies, also called "blind tigers." The loosening of social mores during the 1920s included popularizing the cocktail and the cocktail party among higher socioeconomic groups. Those inclined to help authorities were often intimidated and even murdered. In several major cities—notably those that served as major points of liquor importation, including Chicago and Detroit—gangs wielded significant political power. A Michigan State Police raid on Detroit's Deutsches Haus once netted the mayor, the sheriff, and the local congressman.

Prohibition came into force at 12:00:01 am on January 17, 1920, and the first documented infringement of the Volstead Act occurred in Chicago just one hour later at 12:59 am. According to police reports, six armed men stole $100,000 worth of "medicinal" whiskey from two freight-train cars. This trend in bootlegging liquor created a domino effect among criminals across the United States. Some gang leaders had been stashing liquor months before the Volstead Act was enforced. The ability to sustain a lucrative business in bootlegging liquor was largely helped by the minimal police surveillance at the time. There were only 134 agents designated by the Prohibition Unit to cover all of Illinois, Iowa, and parts of Wisconsin. According to Charles C. Fitzmorris, Chicago's chief of police during the beginning of the Prohibition period, "Sixty percent of my police [were] in the bootleg business."

Section 29 of the Act allowed 200 gallons (the equivalent of about 1000 750-ml bottles) of "non-intoxicating cider and fruit juice" to be made each year at home. Initially "intoxicating" was defined as exceeding 0.5% alcohol by volume, but the Bureau of Internal Revenue struck that down in 1920, effectively legalizing home winemaking. For beer, however, the 0.5% limit remained until 1933. Some vineyards embraced the sale of grapes for making wine at home. Zinfandel grapes were popular among home winemakers living near vineyards, but their tight bunches left their thin skins vulnerable to rot from rubbing and abrasion on the long journey to East Coast markets. The thick skins of Alicante Bouschet were less susceptible to rot, so that and similar varieties were widely planted for the home winemaking market.

The Act contained a number of exceptions and exemptions. Many of them were used to evade the law's intended purpose. For example, the Act allowed a physician to prescribe whiskey for his patients but limited the amount that could be prescribed. Subsequently, the House of Delegates of the American Medical Association voted to submit to Congress a bill to remove the limit on the amount of whiskey that could be prescribed and questioned the ability of a legislature to determine the therapeutic value of any substance. Vine-Glo was produced ostensibly to let people make grape juice from concentrate but it included a warning on its packaging telling people how to make wine from it.

According to Neely, "The Act called for trials for anyone charged with an alcohol-related offense, and juries often failed to convict. Under the state of New York's Mullan–Gage Act, a short-lived local version of the Volstead Act, the first 4,000 arrests led to just six convictions and not one jail sentence".

While the production, transport and sale of intoxicating liquor was illegal, its purchase was ruled legal in United States v. Norris.

== Repeal ==
Prohibition lost support because ignoring the law gained increasing social acceptance and organized crime violence increased. By 1933, public opposition to prohibition had become overwhelming. In March of that year, Congress passed the Cullen–Harrison Act, which legalized "3.2 beer" (i.e. beer containing 3.2% alcohol by weight or 4% by volume) and wines of similarly low alcohol content, rather than the 0.5% limit defined by the original Volstead Act.

In February 1933, Congress passed the Blaine Act, a proposed constitutional amendment to repeal the Eighteenth Amendment to end prohibition. On December 5, 1933, Utah became the 36th state to ratify the Twenty-first Amendment, which repealed the Eighteenth Amendment, voiding the Volstead Act and restoring control of alcohol to the states. All states either made alcohol legal, or passed control over alcohol production and consumption to the counties and provinces they comprise. That led to the creation of dry counties, most of which are in the South.

== See also ==
- Prohibition in the United States
- Bureau of Alcohol, Tobacco, Firearms and Explosives
- Medicinal Liquor Prescriptions Act of 1933
- Comprehensive Drug Abuse Prevention and Control Act of 1970
