= Sullivan Township, Kansas =

Sullivan Township
- Township
- Location in Grant County
- Coordinates: 37°28′00″N 101°18′17″W
- Country: United States
- State: Kansas
- County: Grant

Area
  - Total: 215.40 sq mi (557.89 km^{2})
  - Land: 215.37 sq mi (557.81 km^{2})
  - Water: 0.031 sq mi (0.08 km^{2}) 0.01%
- Elevation: 3,074 ft (937 m)

Population (2020)
  - Total: 271
  - Density: 1.26/sq mi (0.486/km^{2})
- GNIS feature ID: 0485082

Sullivan Township is a township in Grant County, Kansas, United States. As of the 2020 census, its population was 271.

== Geography ==
Sullivan Township covers an area of 215.4 square miles (558 km^{2}) and contains no incorporated settlements. According to the USGS, it contains two cemeteries: Golden and Zionville.

The streams of North Fork Cimarron River and Sand Arroyo Creek run through this township.
