= County seat war =

Conflicts between towns to become the county seat

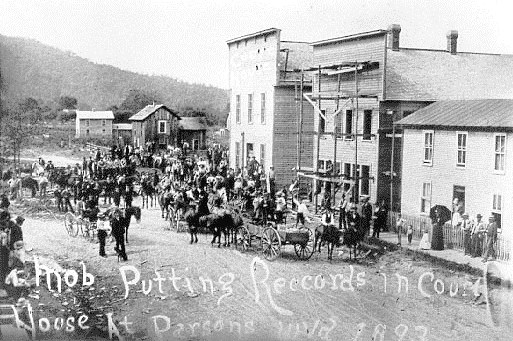
Vigilantes in the 1893 Tucker County Seat War, West Virginia

A county seat war is an American phenomenon that occurred mainly in the Old West as it was being settled and county lines determined. Incidents elsewhere, such as in Michigan, Appalachian Ohio, and West Virginia, have also been recorded. As new towns sprang up and county lines were drawn, there was intense competition for the status and tax benefits bestowed by becoming a county seat. These "wars" often involved nothing more than lining up at the ballot box, but sometimes partisans for a particular town would resort to voter fraud, intimidation, violence, or even killings.

== History ==
The fight between Coronado and neighboring Leoti in western Kansas is considered the bloodiest occurrence of this phenomenon. Leoti hired lawmen Wyatt Earp and Bat Masterson from Dodge City, Kansas, to help win the fight.

Another violent county seat war in Kansas resulted in the Hay Meadow Massacre in Stevens County.

Yet another Kansas county seat war resulted in the dissolution of a county when Eminence and Ravanna fought over the privilege of being the county seat for Garfield County. When people in the county suggested the county be surveyed, it was found that it was too small to be a legal county under a Kansas law established in the late 19th century (Wyandotte County had been founded before this law was passed). Garfield County was then dissolved and annexed into Finney County, which is why that county has a panhandle.

In Colorado, a silver mining boom in Grand County led to the escalation of violence when the county seat was changed from Hot Sulphur Springs to Grand Lake in 1881. Tensions increased until, in 1883, a shootout in Grand Lake led to the deaths of three county commissioners and the county clerk. The county sheriff, who had shot one of the pro-Grand Lake officials in the incident, wound up killing himself soon after the event. The county seat was moved back to Hot Sulphur Springs in 1888.

By the late 19th century, battles over county seats were settled in elections that saw voter fraud, intimidation, and heated debates, as seen in the relocation of several Washington county seats in the late 19th century: Lincoln County from Sprague to Davenport, and Snohomish County from Snohomish to Everett.

In Spokane County, an armed mob from Cheney forcibly seized county records from the elected seat of Spokane Falls (now Spokane), in 1881. Spokane became the county seat in an 1886 election.

A county seat war in Lac qui Parle, Minnesota led to a county courthouse being stolen in the night.

== See also ==
- Coal Wars
- Railroad Wars
- Range war
- Sheep Wars
