= Stevens County, Kansas =

County in Kansas, United States

- County
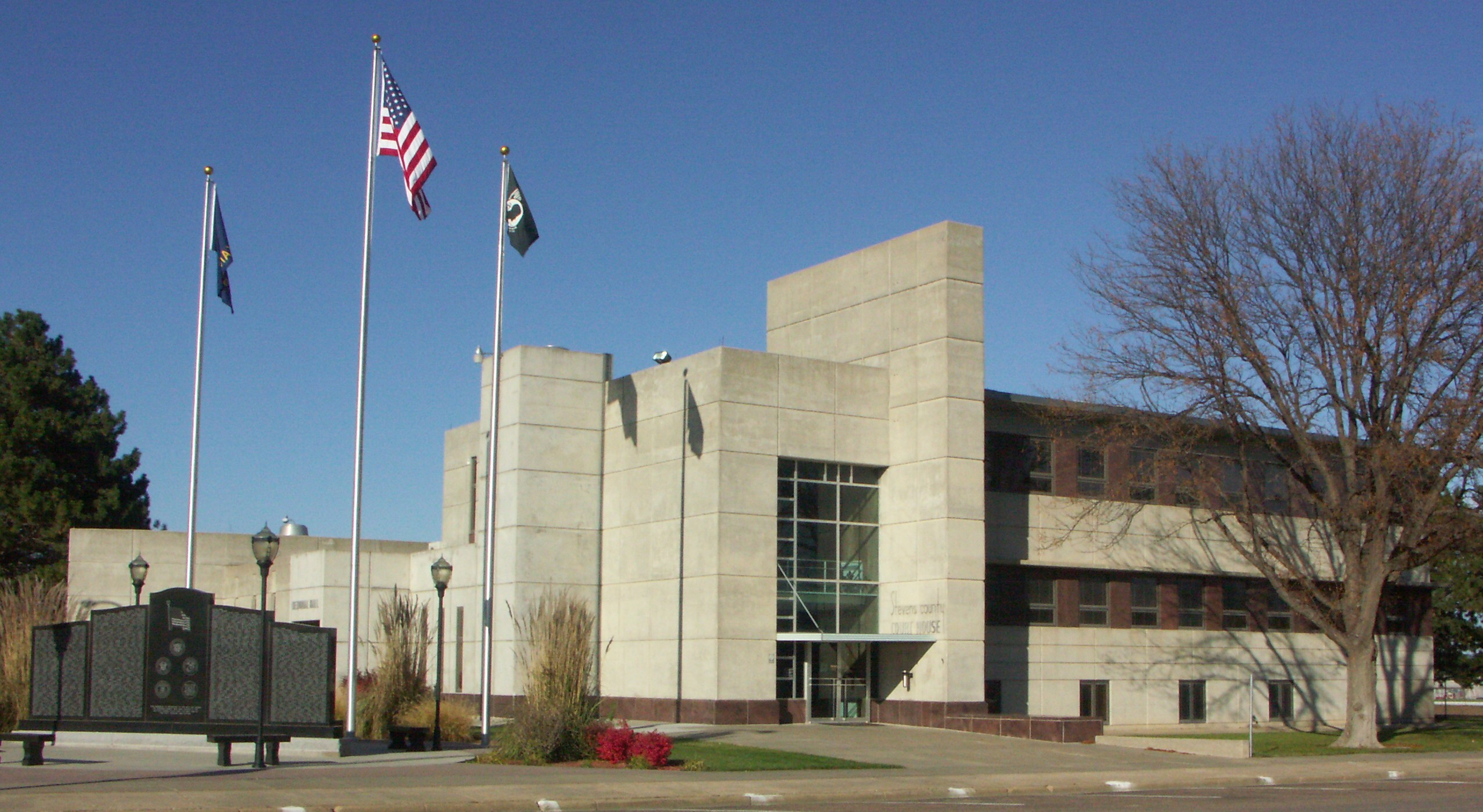
- Stevens County Courthouse in Hugoton (2009)

- Location within the U.S. state of Kansas
- Coordinates: 37°12′N 101°18′W
- Country: United States
- State: Kansas
- Founded: August 3, 1886
- Named for: Thaddeus Stevens
- Seat: Hugoton
- Largest city: Hugoton

Area
  - Total: 727 sq mi (1,880 km^{2})
  - Land: 727 sq mi (1,880 km^{2})
  - Water: 0.2 sq mi (0.52 km^{2}) 0.02%

Population (2020)
  - Total: 5,250
  - Estimate (2025): 4,984 ▼
  - Density: 7.22/sq mi (2.79/km^{2})
- Time zone: UTC−6 (Central)
  - Summer (DST): UTC−5 (CDT)
- Area code: 620
- Congressional district: 1st
- Website: stevenscoks.org

Stevens County is a county located in the U.S. state of Kansas. Its county seat is Hugoton. As of the 2020 census, the county population was 5,250. The county is named for Thaddeus Stevens, a Reconstruction era Pennsylvania politician.

== History ==
In 1886, Stevens County was established.

The first settlers came from McPherson, Kansas in 1885, originally naming their town Hugo after Victor Hugo, before changing it to Hugoton. Other early towns included Lafayette, founded by Quakers in 1886, and Moscow, established in 1887.

In the late 1880s and early 1890s, a violent "county seat war" raged between Hugoton, which had been designated the temporary county seat, and Woodsdale. Incidents included arrests, kidnappings, and killings. The conflict culminated in the July 25, 1888, murder of Sheriff Cross of Woodsdale and three of his men in the Hay Meadow Massacre by Sam Robinson of Hugoton and his supporters. Robinson fled and was never tried for the murders. The issue was eventually resolved in 1887 when Hugoton became the permanent county seat, though tensions remained high for several years after.

Natural gas was discovered in Stevens County in 1927, leading to the development of the Hugoton Natural Gas Area and transforming Hugoton into a major center of the natural gas industry.

In the 1930s, the prosperity of the area was severely affected by its location within the Dust Bowl. This catastrophe intensified the economic impact of the Great Depression in the region.

== Geography ==
According to the U.S. Census Bureau, the county has a total area of 727 square miles (1,880 km^{2}), of which 727 square miles (1,880 km^{2}) is land and 0.2 square miles (0.52 km^{2}) (0.02%) is water.

=== Major highways ===
- Kansas Highway 25
- Kansas Highway 51
- U.S. Route 56

=== Adjacent counties ===
- Grant County (north)
- Haskell County (northeast)
- Seward County (east)
- Texas County, Oklahoma (south)
- Morton County (west)
- Stanton County (northwest)

=== National protected area ===
- Cimarron National Grassland (part)

== Demographics ==
Historical population
Census	Pop.	Note	%±
1880	12		—
1890	1,418		11,716.7%
1900	620		−56.3%
1910	2,453		295.6%
1920	3,943		60.7%
1930	4,655		18.1%
1940	3,193		−31.4%
1950	4,516		41.4%
1960	4,400		−2.6%
1970	4,198		−4.6%
1980	4,736		12.8%
1990	5,048		6.6%
2000	5,463		8.2%
2010	5,724		4.8%
2020	5,250		−8.3%
2025 (est.)	4,984	▼	−5.1%
U.S. Decennial Census; 1790-1960 1900-1990; 1990-2000 2010-2020

=== Racial and ethnic composition ===
Stevens County, Kansas – Racial and ethnic composition Note: the US Census treats Hispanic/Latino as an ethnic category. This table excludes Latinos from the racial categories and assigns them to a separate category. Hispanics/Latinos may be of any race.
Race / Ethnicity (NH = Non-Hispanic)	Pop 1980	Pop 1990	Pop 2000	Pop 2010	Pop 2020	% 1980	% 1990	% 2000	% 2010	% 2020
White alone (NH)	4,372	4,423	4,122	3,744	3,007	92.31%	87.62%	75.45%	65.41%	57.28%
Black or African American alone (NH)	36	26	43	14	20	0.76%	0.52%	0.79%	0.24%	0.38%
Native American or Alaska Native alone (NH)	39	38	49	37	20	0.82%	0.75%	0.90%	0.65%	0.38%
Asian alone (NH)	2	9	12	15	22	0.04%	0.18%	0.22%	0.26%	0.42%
Native Hawaiian or Pacific Islander alone (NH)	x	x	1	0	0	x	x	0.02%	0.00%	0.00%
Other race alone (NH)	0	0	0	4	16	0.00%	0.00%	0.00%	0.07%	0.30%
Mixed race or Multiracial (NH)	x	x	49	44	145	x	x	0.90%	0.77%	2.76%
Hispanic or Latino (any race)	287	552	1,187	1,866	2,020	6.06%	10.94%	21.73%	32.60%	38.48%
Total	4,736	5,048	5,463	5,724	5,250	100.00%	100.00%	100.00%	100.00%	100.00%

=== 2020 census ===
As of the 2020 census, the county had a population of 5,250. The median age was 36.2 years. 28.4% of residents were under the age of 18 and 15.9% of residents were 65 years of age or older. For every 100 females there were 99.8 males, and for every 100 females age 18 and over there were 99.2 males age 18 and over.

The racial makeup of the county was 66.4% White, 0.4% Black or African American, 1.2% American Indian and Alaska Native, 0.4% Asian, 0.0% Native Hawaiian and Pacific Islander, 20.3% from some other race, and 11.4% from two or more races. Hispanic or Latino residents of any race comprised 38.5% of the population.

0.0% of residents lived in urban areas, while 100.0% lived in rural areas.

There were 1,905 households in the county, of which 37.6% had children under the age of 18 living with them and 19.5% had a female householder with no spouse or partner present. About 23.2% of all households were made up of individuals and 10.8% had someone living alone who was 65 years of age or older.

There were 2,240 housing units, of which 15.0% were vacant. Among occupied housing units, 71.9% were owner-occupied and 28.1% were renter-occupied. The homeowner vacancy rate was 2.3% and the rental vacancy rate was 17.1%.

=== 2000 census ===
As of the census of 2000, there were 5,463 people, 1,988 households, and 1,457 families residing in the county. The population density was 8 people per square mile (3.1 people/km^{2}). There were 2,265 housing units at an average density of 3 per square mile (1.2/km^{2}). The racial makeup of the county was 83.01% White, 0.93% Black or African American, 0.93% Native American, 0.24% Asian, 0.02% Pacific Islander, 13.25% from other races, and 1.61% from two or more races. 21.73% of the population were Hispanic or Latino of any race.

There were 1,988 households, out of which 38.80% had children under the age of 18 living with them, 63.10% were married couples living together, 7.10% had a female householder with no husband present, and 26.70% were non-families. 24.30% of all households were made up of individuals, and 12.10% had someone living alone who was 65 years of age or older. The average household size was 2.72 and the average family size was 3.27.

In the county, the population was spread out, with 31.20% under the age of 18, 8.30% from 18 to 24, 27.80% from 25 to 44, 19.40% from 45 to 64, and 13.30% who were 65 years of age or older. The median age was 34 years. For every 100 females there were 95.30 males. For every 100 females age 18 and over, there were 92.50 males.

The median income for a household in the county was $41,830, and the median income for a family was $49,063. Males had a median income of $36,525 versus $22,803 for females. The per capita income for the county was $17,814. About 8.30% of families and 10.30% of the population were below the poverty line, including 15.10% of those under age 18 and 4.70% of those age 65 or over.

== Government ==
=== County ===
Stevens County is governed by the Stevens County Commissioners. The current members are Joe D. Thompson, Tron Stegman, and Shannon Crawford.

=== Presidential elections ===
Presidential election results

United States presidential election results for Stevens County, Kansas
Year	Republican		Democratic		Third party(ies)	
Year	No.	%	No.	%	No.	%
1888	307	40.99%	268	35.78%	174	23.23%
1892	85	31.48%	0	0.00%	185	68.52%
1896	48	32.21%	101	67.79%	0	0.00%
1900	66	42.31%	89	57.05%	1	0.64%
1904	122	64.21%	40	21.05%	28	14.74%
1908	258	48.22%	215	40.19%	62	11.59%
1912	117	19.34%	237	39.17%	251	41.49%
1916	391	33.48%	646	55.31%	131	11.22%
1920	876	69.47%	346	27.44%	39	3.09%
1924	913	66.55%	302	22.01%	157	11.44%
1928	1,133	78.52%	300	20.79%	10	0.69%
1932	578	31.08%	1,225	65.86%	57	3.06%
1936	701	40.52%	1,023	59.13%	6	0.35%
1940	851	55.05%	674	43.60%	21	1.36%
1944	760	64.63%	414	35.20%	2	0.17%
1948	822	54.04%	666	43.79%	33	2.17%
1952	1,480	77.16%	423	22.05%	15	0.78%
1956	1,273	69.00%	565	30.62%	7	0.38%
1960	1,405	68.74%	630	30.82%	9	0.44%
1964	992	49.11%	1,006	49.80%	22	1.09%
1968	1,157	58.38%	528	26.64%	297	14.98%
1972	1,392	74.48%	408	21.83%	69	3.69%
1976	1,262	57.23%	901	40.86%	42	1.90%
1980	1,502	72.04%	478	22.93%	105	5.04%
1984	1,863	82.03%	386	17.00%	22	0.97%
1988	1,642	71.17%	612	26.53%	53	2.30%
1992	1,408	56.84%	390	15.74%	679	27.41%
1996	1,548	70.88%	405	18.54%	231	10.58%
2000	1,714	81.19%	345	16.34%	52	2.46%
2004	1,936	85.47%	310	13.69%	19	0.84%
2008	1,815	85.33%	283	13.31%	29	1.36%
2012	1,749	85.99%	252	12.39%	33	1.62%
2016	1,599	84.56%	220	11.63%	72	3.81%
2020	1,760	86.66%	237	11.67%	34	1.67%
2024	1,595	86.92%	210	11.44%	30	1.63%

Stevens County is overwhelmingly Republican. It has not been won by a Democrat at Presidential level since Lyndon Johnson won by fourteen votes in 1964. In fact, the last Democrat to crack thirty percent of the county's vote was Jimmy Carter in 1976, and since Carter only Michael Dukakis during the drought and farm crisis-influenced 1988 election has received so much as twenty percent.

=== Laws ===
The Kansas Constitution was amended in 1986 to allow the sale of alcoholic liquor by the individual drink with the approval of voters, either with or without a minimum of 30% of sales coming from food. Stevens County is one of 35 counties in the state that allows for the sale of liquor by the drink without the minimum food sales stipulation.

== Education ==
=== Unified school districts ===
- Moscow USD 209
- Hugoton USD 210

== Communities ==
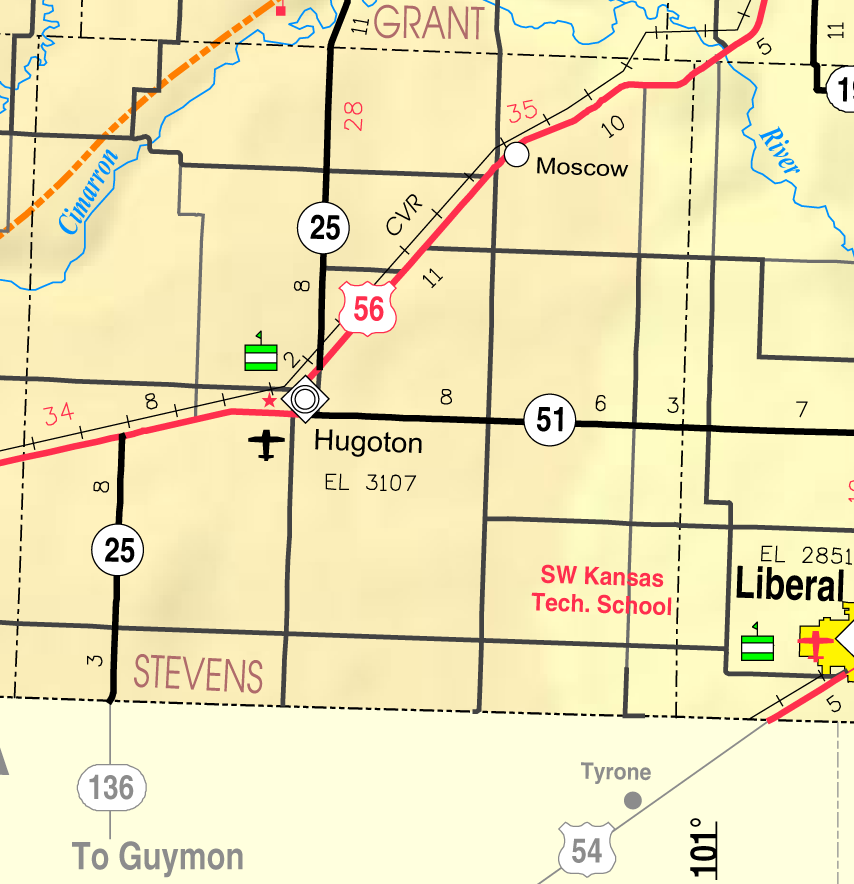
2005 map of Stevens County (map legend)

List of current townships / incorporated cities / unincorporated communities / extinct former communities within Stevens County.

=== Cities ===
- Hugoton (county seat)
- Moscow

=== Ghost towns ===
- Feterita
- Woodsdale

=== Townships ===
Area affected by 1930s Dust Bowl

Stevens County is divided into six townships. None of the cities within the county are considered governmentally independent, and all figures for the townships include those of the cities. In the following table, the population center is the largest city (or cities) included in that township's population total, if it is of a significant size.

Sources: 2000 U.S. Gazetteer from the U.S. Census Bureau.
Township	FIPS	Population center	Population	Population density /km^{2} (/sq mi)	Land area km^{2} (sq mi)	Water area km^{2} (sq mi)	Water %	Geographic coordinates
Banner	04125		164	1 (2)	277 (107)	0 (0)	0%	37°3′41″N 101°11′37″W
Center	12200		4,131	15 (38)	280 (108)	0 (0)	0.02%	37°10′38″N 101°19′7″W
Harmony	30150		143	1 (1)	280 (108)	0 (0)	0%	37°19′22″N 101°26′55″W
Moscow	48625		711	2 (4)	442 (171)	0 (0)	0.09%	37°18′28″N 101°12′12″W
Voorhees	74200		145	0 (1)	349 (135)	0 (0)	0%	37°3′26″N 101°23′16″W
West Center	76800		169	1 (2)	257 (99)	0 (0)	0%	37°11′30″N 101°26′19″W

== See also ==
Community information for Kansas

- Kansas locations by per capita income
- List of counties in Kansas
- List of townships in Kansas
- List of cities in Kansas
- List of unincorporated communities in Kansas
- List of ghost towns in Kansas
