= K-99 (Kansas highway) =

State highway in Kansas, U.S.

K-99
- K-99 highlighted in red

Route information
- Maintained by KDOT and the cities of Sedan, Emporia, Alma and Wamego
- Length: 234.473 mi (377.348 km)
- Existed: 1926–present
- History: Renumbered to K-99 May 17, 1938

Major junctions
- South end: SH-99 in Chautauqua
- US-166 near Sedan; US-160 near Moline; US-400 near Severy; US-54 near Eureka; US-50 in Emporia; I-35 in Emporia; US-56 in Admire; I-70 / US-40 near Alma; US-24 in Wamego; US-36 near Beattie
- North end: N-99 in Summerfield

Location
- Country: United States
- State: Kansas
- Counties: Chautauqua, Elk, Greenwood, Lyon, Wabaunsee, Pottawatomie, Marshall

Highway system
- Kansas State Highway System; Interstate; US; State; Spurs
← K-98	→ K-100

K-99 is a state highway in the U.S. state of Kansas. The highway runs 234.473 miles (377.348 km) from Oklahoma State Highway 99 (SH-99) at the Oklahoma state line near Chautauqua north to Nebraska Highway 99 (N-99) at the Nebraska state line in Summerfield. K-99 connects Emporia with several smaller county seats to the south and north, including Sedan, Howard, Eureka, Alma, and Westmoreland while passing through the Flint Hills of eastern Kansas.

The highway that became K-99, was originally designated in 1926 as K-11, and travelled from Sedan north to Frankfort. By 1927, the northern terminus was extended north to US-36 in Beattie. By 1931, it was extended south to the Oklahoma border. Then by 1932, it had been extended north to the Nebraska border. K-11 was renumbered to K-99 on May 17, 1938, along with Oklahoma and Nebraska doing the same to make a three-state continuous Highway 99.

== Route description ==
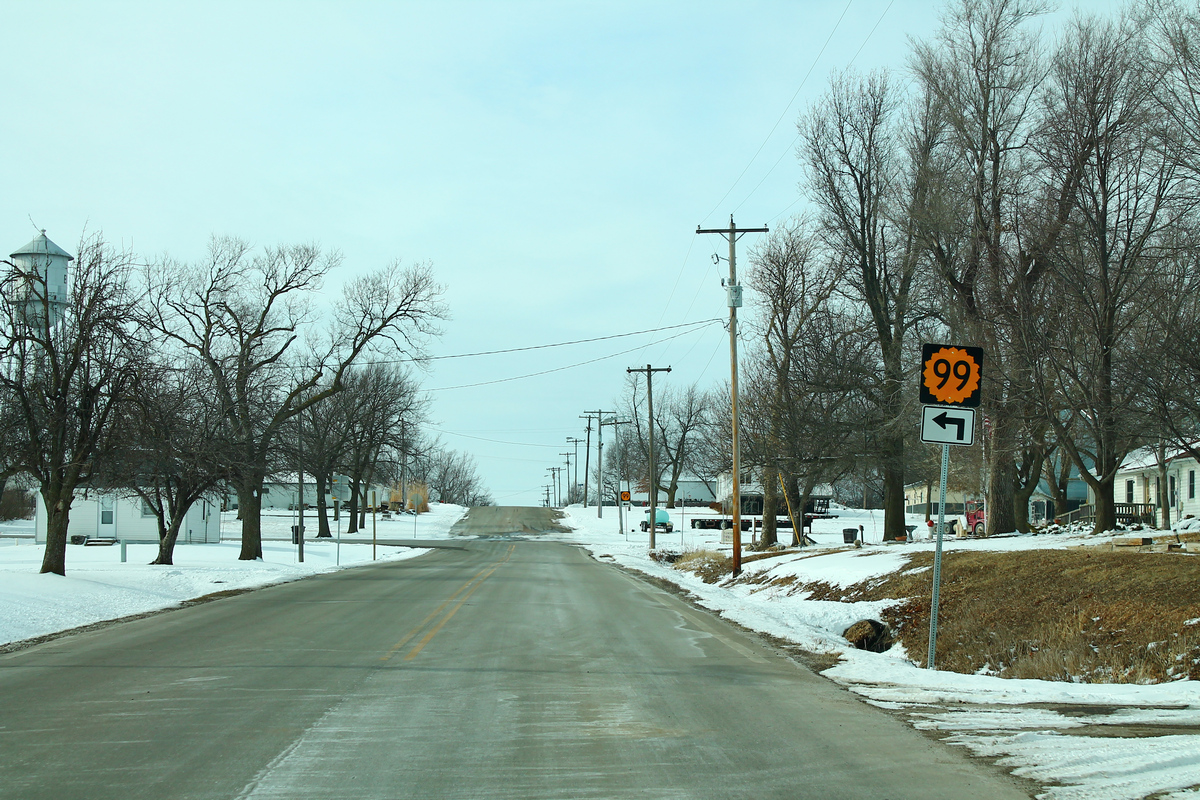
K-99 in Beattie

K-99 passes through four physiographic regions. The highway passes through the western edge of the Chautauqua Hills immediately north of the Oklahoma state line. K-99 continues through the Osage Cuestas. The highway passes through the Flint Hills from north of Emporia to the Kansas River at Wamego. A subset of the route's course through the Flint Hills, from Eskridge to near Wamego, is part of the Native Stone Scenic Byway, which recognizes the region's limestone, which was used in much of the region's masonry. From there, K-99 passes through the Glaciated Region to the Nebraska state line. K-99 has four memorial highway designations. From the Oklahoma state line to Severy, the highway is part of the Prairie Parkway. The route is part of Maisie Devore Highway along its concurrency with K-4 from Eskridge to near Alma. K-99 follows The Road to Oz from Interstate 70 (I-70) near Alma to the south city limit of Frankfort. Finally, the route is named the Frankfort Boys World War II Memorial Highway from the south city limit of Frankfort to U.S. Route 36 (US-36) near Beattie. The Frankfort Boys designation, approved by the Kansas Legislature in 2012, honors the World War II casualties of the city of Frankfort; more residents per capita died in the war from Frankfort than from any other community in the United States.

=== Chautauqua to Emporia ===
K-99 begins at the Oklahoma state line in Chautauqua County, as a continuation of Oklahoma State Highway 99. The highway passes through the city of Chautauqua on Johnson Street. K-99 intersects US-166 north of Chautauqua, and the state route continues north concurrently with US-166 Bus. across Middle Caney Creek, which feeds the Caney River, into the city of Sedan, the county seat of Chautauqua County. The highways enter town on School Street and turn west onto Main Street, which passes by the Emmett Kelly Museum and the historic Bradford Hotel. K-99 and US-166 Bus. cross Deer Creek to leave the city and diverge; the business route heads southwest to rejoin US-166, and K-99 curves north toward Elk County. K-99 crosses the South Fork of Wildcat Creek, which feeds the Elk River, and has a grade crossing of the South Kansas and Oklahoma Railroad immediately to the south of its junction with US-160 east of Moline. The two highways cross the North Fork of Wildcat Creek together before they diverge; US-166 heads east toward Elk Falls. K-99 crosses the Mound Branch of the Elk River and the river itself south of Howard. The route follows the east city limit of the county seat, home of the historic Elk County Courthouse and the Benson Historical Museum. North of Howard, K-99 crosses Pawpaw Creek and parallels Snake Creek toward Greenwood County.

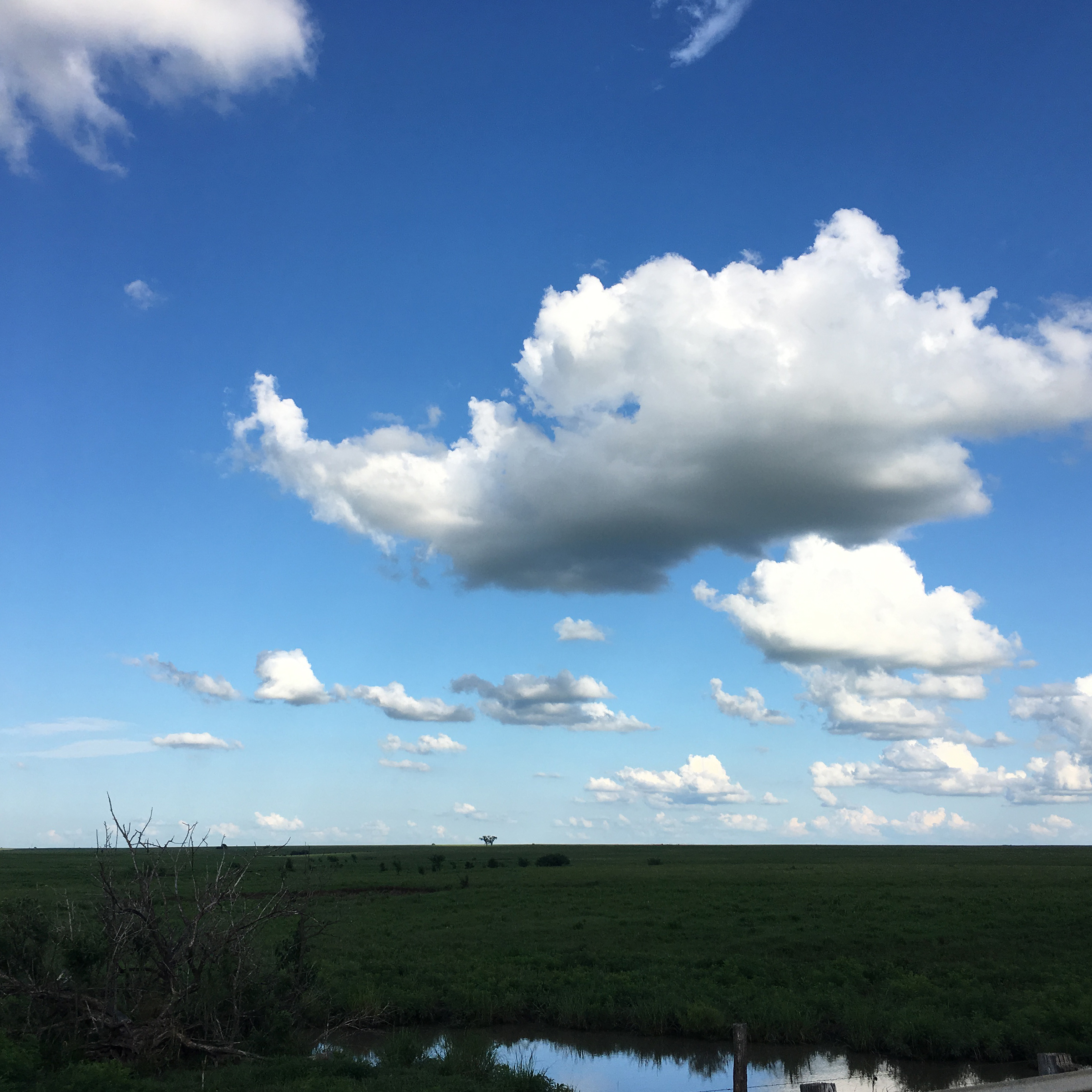
Prairie view along K-99 in Greenwood County

K-99 crosses Salt Creek, which feeds the Fall River, and passes to the west and north of Severy, the latter side during the route's 1-mile-long (1.6 km) concurrency with east–west running US-400. The state highway crosses Plum Creek immediately to the north of US-400 and Otter Creek south of the city of Climax, which the highway bypasses to the west. K-99 crosses the Fall River south of its junction with US-54 east of the county seat of Eureka. The two highways head northeast and cross Bachelor Creek, which feeds the Verdigris River, before K-99 splits north. K-99 crosses Homer Creek and Indian Creek south of Hamilton and Onion Creek and Willow Creek north of that city. The highway crosses Holderman Creek before it briefly enters the city of Madison. In its brief transverse, K-99 veers northwest while K-249 (Southwest Boulevard) heads toward downtown. The highway meets the western end of K-58 (Madison Avenue) west of the city. North of K-58, K-99 crosses the Verdigris River immediately downstream from the confluence of the river's North and South branches and 1 mile (1.6 km) west of the historic Verdigris River Bridge north of Madison. The highway continues into Lyon County, where the highway crosses Eagle Creek, a tributary of the Neosho River, south of Olpe, where the route curves west through town before resuming its northward course toward Emporia.

K-99 passes Emporia Municipal Airport and enters the city of Emporia on Commercial Street by crossing the Cottonwood River parallel to the historic Soden's Grove Bridge, a Marsh arch bridge. The highway passes by Soden Park, the site of the David Traylor Zoo of Emporia, and the historic Hallie B. Soden House and to the west of the Richard Howe House in the city's south end. K-99 enters the Emporia Downtown Historic District by crossing at grade the three-track BNSF Railway. North of its intersection with US-50 (6th Avenue), the highway passes by the Granada Theater, the Lyon County History Center, and the Kress Building and east of the Keebler-Stone House. North of downtown, K-99 passes east of the Warren Wesley Finney House and west of the Harris-Borman House and the William Allen White House State Historic Site, a house also known as Red Rocks. At 12th Avenue, which leads west to the Walt Mason House and the Andrew Carnegie Memorial Library, Commercial Street ends at the south end of the Emporia State University campus. K-99 turns west onto 12th Avenue and north onto Merchant Street to pass along the west side of the campus, which includes the Johnston Geology Museum, the Schmidt Museum of Natural History, and the National Teachers Hall of Fame. At the north end of campus, the highway has a diamond interchange with I-35 and leaves the city of Emporia by crossing the Neosho River.

=== Emporia to Summerfield ===
K-99 crosses Allen Creek and crosses over the I-335 portion of the Kansas Turnpike. The highway turns east, crosses the turnpike again, and turns north again 1 mile (1.6 km) south of its junction with K-170. K-99 crosses the turnpike for the third and final time and crosses Duck Creek and Hill Creek on its way to Admire. Within the city, the highway intersects a rail trail along a former Missouri Pacific Railroad line, and north of town, the route intersects US-56. K-99 crosses One Hundred and Forty-Two Mile Creek and Elm Creek, whose confluence form the Marais des Cygnes River, before the highway enters Wabaunsee County. The highway meets the western end of K-31 and crosses Dragoon Creek before entering the city of Eskridge, within which the route follows 3rd Avenue and passes to the north of the Eskridge Bandstand. K-99 intersects K-4 (Main Street), and the two highways head west out of town together. The routes pass to the north of Lake Wabaunsee, around which the lake's circumferential road crosses two historic stone arch bridges. West of the lake, K-4 and K-99 follow a curvaceous path—compared with following section line roads—before the highways diverge.

K-99 continues north through the valley of the South Branch of Mill Creek, within which the highway does not follow section lines. The highway passes to the west of the Peter Thoes Barn and crosses the West Branch of Mill Creek just west of its confluence with the South Branch. K-99 curves northwest into the city of Alma, the county seat of Wabaunsee County. The highway has a grade crossing of the Union Pacific Railroad and curves north onto Missouri Street to pass through the Alma Downtown Historic District, which includes the Wabaunsee County Courthouse, the Wabaunsee County Historical Museum, and the Stuewe House. South of the Brandt Hotel, K-99 turns east onto 7th Street and curves north to leave town as it approaches the railroad. North of Alma, the highway crosses Hendricks Creek and has a diamond interchange with I-70 and US-40. K-99 meets the eastern end of K-18 east of the unincorporated village of Wabaunsee and crosses the Kansas River on the K-99 Wamego Bridge into the city of Wamego in Pottawatomie County.

K-99 passes through Wamego on Lincoln Avenue, which has a double-track grade crossing of the Union Pacific Railroad and passes by the Oz Museum, a museum dedicated to the Wizard of Oz, and The Columbian Theatre. The highway passes to the west of the Wamego Historical Museum, which includes the Old Dutch Mill, and to the east of the historic Cassius & Adelia Baker House and George and Virginia Trout House. At the north end of the city, K-99 intersects US-24. The state highway crosses Rock Creek while passing through the city of Louisville, which lies west of the Vermillion Creek Crossing of the Oregon Trail. K-99 crosses Boxelder Creek and Rock Creek and passes the John McKimmons Barn on its way to the county seat of Westmoreland, where the route's path crosses that of the Oregon Trail and near the Rock Creek Valley Historical Society Museum. The highway has a brief concurrency with K-16 while passing to the west of the village of Blaine before it enters Marshall County.

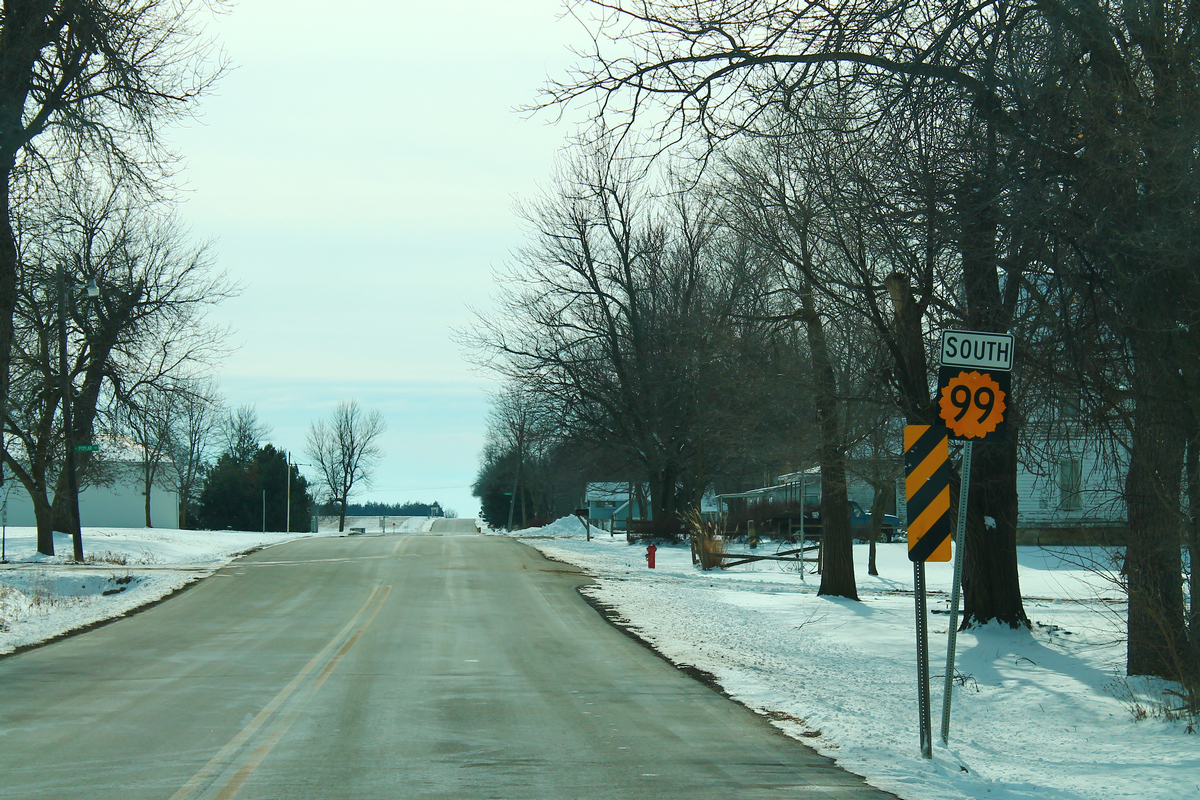
K-99 southbound by Summerfield

K-99 crosses the Clear Fork of the Black Vermillion River and Cedar Creek on the way to Frankfort, at the south end of which the highway crosses the Black Vermillion River proper. The highway follows Kansas Avenue through a grade crossing of a Union Pacific rail line to 2nd Street, onto which K-99 turns east to join K-9. The two highways turn north one block east at Locust Street, which leads south to the Old Frankfort City Jail. K-99 and K-9 pass the Frankfort School on their way out of town, and the two highways diverge 1 mile (1.6 km) north of the city limit. K-99 crosses Snipe Creek before intersecting US-36 (Pony Express Highway) south of Beattie. The highway crosses Wolf Creek and intersects a Union Pacific rail line as the route enters the city from the south on Center Avenue and leaves to the east on Elm Street. K-99 makes three right-angle turns 0.5 miles (0.80 km) apart, the last its final turn north in Kansas, and intersects the Union Pacific rail line a third time where the highway crosses the path of the Pony Express. The highway passes to the west of the St. Bridget Church before entering the city of Summerfield, through which the highway passes on 4th Street and passes by the Transue Brothers Blacksmith & Wagon Shop. K-99 ends at the north city limit, which is also the Nebraska state line, and the road continues as Nebraska Highway 99.

== History ==
K-99 was first designated as K-11 in 1926, to a highway that ran from K-44 in Sedan north through Emporia and Eskridge to K-6 in Frankfort. By 1927, K-44 became US-166 and K-6 became K-9, also the northern terminus was extended north to US-36 in Beattie. By 1931, K-11 was extended south to the Oklahoma border. Then by 1932, it had been extended north to the Nebraska border. In a November 6, 1936 resolution, K-11 was realigned from north of Louisville to south of Westmoreland, to eliminate five sharp curves. K-11 was renumbered to K-99 on May 17, 1938, along with Oklahoma and Nebraska doing the same to make a three state continuous Highway 99.

In a June 14, 1940 resolution, K-99 was realigned between Frankfort and US-36, which eliminated four sharp curves. In an August 10, 1950 resolution, K-99 was realigned from Alma southward 1.1 miles (1.8 km). In a November 24, 1954 resolution, a 11.315-mile-long (18.210 km) section of K-99 was realigned south of Alma. In a June 28, 1958 resolution, the junction with US-24 and US-40 was moved 1 mile (1.6 km) northwest in Wamego. In a June 8, 1960 resolution, the overlap with US-59 was realigned east of Eureka, to eliminate two sharp curves. In a February 11, 1964 resolution, K-99 was realigned out of Madison, to the west of the city. In a January 18, 1978 resolution, K-99 and US-160 was realigned slightly where they overlap, northeast of Moline. In an October 10, 1984 resolution, K-99 was realigned slightly, just north of I-35, to eliminate two sharp curves. Before 1985, K-99 turned east to Severy, then turned north and crossed K-96. Then in an April 22, 1985 resolution, K-99 was realigned to go direct north to K-96, then overlap it east for 1 then turn north again. The overlap with US-166 Bus. in Sedan was originally US-166. In a December 22, 1993 resolution, KDOT approved and requested to realign US-166 south of Sedan, and to re-designate the former alignment as US-166 Business. This request was approved by AASHTO in an April 10, 1994 meeting. Until 2004, K-57 overlapped K-99 from just north of K-249 to Emporia. Then in a September 20, 2004 resolution, K-57 was truncated to Dwight, and K-57 from K-99 east was renumbered to K-58.

On May 21, 2019, the highway was closed from Emporia to Olpe, due to flooding from Cottonwood River. Also a segment from I-35 to K-170 was closed due to flooding from Dow Creek, which opened back up early the next day. The other section was fully open to traffic on May 28, 2019.

In December 2020, a project began to reconstruct and realign a section of K-99, between two miles (3.2 km) north of I-70 and just south of K-18. The project is expected to be completed by the summer of 2022. Ebert Construction Company of Wamego is the contractor on the $12.6 million project. The improved section will better serve the truck traffic from the Caterpillar facility.

== Major intersections ==
County	Location	mi	km	Destinations	Notes
Chautauqua		0.000	0.000	SH-99 south – Pawhuska	Southern terminus; Oklahoma state line
Chautauqua		5.858	9.428	US 166 Bus. begin / US-166 – Arkansas City, Coffeyville	Eastern terminus of US-166 Bus.; south end of concurrency with US-166 Bus.
Chautauqua	Sedan	9.872	15.887	US 166 Bus. west – Cedarvale, Arkansas City	North end of concurrency with US-166 Bus.
Elk		28.139	45.285	US-160 west – Moline	South end of concurrency with US-160
Elk		28.703	46.193	US-160 east – Elk Falls, Independence	North end of concurrency with US-160
Greenwood		47.133	75.853	US-400 west – Wichita	South end of concurrency with US-400
Greenwood	Severy	48.198	77.567	US-400 east – Fredonia	North end of concurrency with US-400
Greenwood		61.112	98.350	US-54 west – Eureka	South end of concurrency with US-54
Greenwood		64.609	103.978	US-54 east – Yates Center	North end of concurrency with US-54
Greenwood	Madison	84.806	136.482	K-249 north (Southwest Boulevard) – Madison	Southern terminus of K-249
Greenwood		85.906	138.252	K-58 east – Madison	Western terminus of K-58
Lyon	Emporia	105.356	169.554	US-50 (6th Avenue) – Ottawa, Strong City	
Lyon	Emporia	106.702	171.720	I-35 – Kansas City, Wichita	I-35 exit 130; diamond interchange
Lyon		117.338	188.837	K-170 east – Reading, Osage City	Western terminus of K-170
Lyon	Admire	126.458	203.514	US-56 – Burlingame, Allen	
Wabaunsee		135.586	218.205	K-31 east – Harveyville	Western terminus of K-31
Wabaunsee	Eskridge	141.276	227.362	K-4 east (Main Street) – Topeka	South end of concurrency with K-4
Wabaunsee		151.428	243.700	K-4 west – Alta Vista	North end of concurrency with K-4
Wabaunsee		164.196	264.248	I-70 / US-40 – Topeka, Salina	I-70 exit 328; diamond interchange
Wabaunsee		170.391	274.218	K-18 west – Wabaunsee, Zeandale, Manhattan	Eastern terminus of K-18
Kansas River		173.428– 173.617	279.105– 279.409	K-99 Wamego Bridge	
Pottawatomie	Wamego	174.424	280.708	US-24 – Manhattan, St. Marys	
Pottawatomie	Blaine	195.622	314.823	K-16 west – Olsburg, Manhattan	South end of concurrency with K-16
Pottawatomie	Blaine	196.023	315.468	K-16 east – Wheaton, Onaga	North end of concurrency with K-16
Marshall	Frankfort	210.232	338.336	K-9 west (2nd Street) – Blue Rapids	South end of concurrency with K-9
Marshall		211.883	340.993	K-9 east – Vermillion, Centralia	North end of concurrency with K-9
Marshall		219.946	353.969	US-36 (Pony Express Highway) – Marysville, Seneca	
Marshall	Summerfield	234.473	377.348	N-99 north – Pawnee City	Northern terminus; Nebraska state line
1.000 mi = 1.609 km; 1.000 km = 0.621 mi: Concurrency terminus
