= Howe House =

Howe House may refer to:

- Howe House (Los Angeles, California), 2422 N. Silver Ridge Ave., Los Angeles, a Los Angeles Historic-Cultural Monument in Silver Lake
- Edward P. Howe, Jr., House, Sacramento, California, listed on the NRHP in Sacramento County, California
- Howe-Waffle House and Carriage House, Santa Ana, California, NRHP-listed
- John I. Howe House, Derby, Connecticut, listed on the NRHP in New Haven County, Connecticut
- Edgar W. Howe House, Atchison, Kansas, listed on the NRHP in Atchison County, Kansas
- Richard Howe House, Emporia, Kansas, listed on the NRHP in Lyon County, Kansas
- John Badlam Howe Mansion, Howe, Indiana, listed on the NRHP in LaGrange County, Indiana
- Howe House (Cambridge, Massachusetts), NRHP-listed
- Samuel Gridley and Julia Ward Howe House, Boston, Massachusetts, NRHP-listed
- Frank M. Howe Residence, Kansas City, Missouri, listed on the NRHP in Jackson County, Missouri
- John G. Howe House, Stevensville, Montana, listed on the NRHP in Ravalli County, Montana
- Gridley-Howe-Faden-Atkins Farmstead, Kimball, Nebraska, listed on the NRHP in Kimball County, Nebraska
- Howe-Quimby House, Hopkinton, New Hampshire, listed on the NRHP in Merrimack County, New Hampshire
- Dr. John Quincy Howe House, Phelps, New York, listed on the NRHP in New York
- Ballard-Howe House, Seattle, Washington, listed on the NRHP in King County, Washington
