= K-249 (Kansas highway) =

State highway in Kansas, U.S.

K-249
- Southwest Boulevard
- K-249 highlighted in red

Route information
- Maintained by KDOT
- Length: 0.680 mi (1,094 m)
- Existed: 1963–present

Major junctions
- South end: K-99 by Madison
- North end: K-58 in Madison

Location
- Country: United States
- State: Kansas
- Counties: Greenwood

Highway system
- Kansas State Highway System; Interstate; US; State; Spurs
← K-248	→ K-251

K-249, also known as Southwest Boulevard, (Note: Not to be confused with Southwest Boulevard (Kansas City).) is a 0.680-mile-long (1.094 km) north–south state highway located entirely within Greenwood County in the U.S. state of Kansas. K-249's southern terminus is at K-99 just outside the City of Madison, and the northern terminus is at K-58 in Madison. K-249 was originally a section of K-99 before it was realigned to the west of the city.

== Route description ==
K-249's southern terminus is at an intersection with K-99 just south of Madison. The highway travels north along the Madison city line as Southwest Boulevard. The highway reaches an intersection with McCurry Street, where it enters the city. K-249 continues north past an intersection with Elm Street before curving slightly northeast. The highway curves back north and reaches its northern terminus at K-58, known as 4th Street and West Lincoln Street.

The Kansas Department of Transportation (KDOT) tracks the traffic levels on its highways. On K-249 in 2020, they determined that on average the traffic was 570 vehicles per day on K-249. The entire length of K-249 is two-lane and maintained by KDOT. K-249 is not included in the National Highway System. The National Highway System is a system of highways important to the nation's defense, economy, and mobility.

== History ==
In December 1961, the Kansas State Highway Commission, now known as KDOT, announced a project to reroute K-99 to the west of Madison. The project was needed to bring K-99 above the 25-year flood level and eliminate several curves. The section of K-99 and K-57 from Madison Avenue north out of the city would be abandoned, and instead K-57 would follow Madison Avenue west to the new alignment of K-99. The section of K-99 from Madison south to the new alignment would be assigned a new route number. In Mid July 1964, bids were taken for the new bypass.

The highway was first designated as K-249 in a resolution approved on June 12, 1963. This resolution was updated in a resolution approved on February 11, 1964. In late August 1964, work began on the new bypass route. The roughly $1 million (equivalent to $7.57 million in 2024 dollars) bypass opened to traffic on November 3, 1965. In a resolution approved on September 20, 2004, by Secretary of Transportation Deb Miller, K-57's eastern terminus was truncated to end at K-4 in Dwight. The former section from K-99 east to east to US-169 was renumbered, making K-249's northern terminus K-58.

== Major intersections ==
The entire route is in Greenwood County.

Location	mi	km	Destinations	Notes
Madison Township	0.000	0.000	K-99 – Hamilton, Emporia	Southern terminus
Madison	0.680	1.094	K-58 (Lincoln Street / 4th Street)	Northern terminus
1.000 mi = 1.609 km; 1.000 km = 0.621 mi
