= National Register of Historic Places listings in Lyon County, Kansas =

Location of Lyon County in Kansas

This is a list of the National Register of Historic Places listings in Lyon County, Kansas.

This is intended to be a complete list of the properties on the National Register of Historic Places in Lyon County, Kansas, United States. The locations of National Register properties for which the latitude and longitude coordinates are included below, may be seen in a map.

There are 20 properties listed on the National Register in the county.

This National Park Service list is complete through NPS recent listings posted December 12, 2025.

== Current listings ==
	Name on the Register	Image	Date listed	Location	City or town	Description
1	Anderson Carnegie Memorial Library	Anderson Carnegie Memorial Library	June 25, 1987 (#87000958)	1220 C of E Drive, former College of Emporia; 38°24′46″N 96°11′38″W	Emporia	
2	Col. H.C. and Susan Cross House	Col. H.C. and Susan Cross House	August 4, 2011 (#11000505)	526 Union St. 38°24′17″N 96°10′34″W	Emporia	
3	Emporia Downtown Historic District	Emporia Downtown Historic District	May 1, 2012 (#12000249)	Generally bounded by 10th & 3rd Aves., Mechanic & Merchant Sts. 38°24′21″N 96°10′49″W	Emporia	
4	Warren Wesley Finney House	Warren Wesley Finney House	May 7, 1992 (#92000470)	927 State St. 38°24′35″N 96°11′07″W	Emporia	
5	Granada Theater	Granada Theater	April 4, 1985 (#85000693)	809 Commercial; 38°24′28″N 96°10′48″W	Emporia	
6	Harris Bridge	Harris Bridge	July 2, 1985 (#85001434)	3 miles (4.8 km) north and 4 miles (6.4 km) west of Americus; 38°33′01″N 96°20′06″W	Americus	
7	Harris-Borman House	Harris-Borman House	April 28, 1992 (#92000431)	827 Mechanic; 38°24′31″N 96°10′45″W	Emporia	
8	Hartford Collegiate Institute	Hartford Collegiate Institute	February 23, 1972 (#72000512)	Southwestern corner of College and Plumb Aves. 38°18′32″N 95°57′25″W	Hartford	
9	Richard Howe House	Richard Howe House	July 17, 1986 (#86001701)	315 E. Logan Ave. 38°23′29″N 96°10′28″W	Emporia	
10	Keebler-Stone House	Keebler-Stone House	April 28, 1992 (#92000387)	831 Constitution St. 38°24′27″N 96°10′57″W	Emporia	
11	Kress Building	Kress Building	August 25, 1983 (#83000431)	702 Commercial St. 38°24′23″N 96°10′47″W	Emporia	
12	Walt Mason House	Walt Mason House	April 30, 1992 (#92000446)	606 W. 12th Ave. 38°24′45″N 96°11′20″W	Emporia	
13	W.T. and Olivia McCarty House		April 18, 2025 (#100011717)	1004 Rural Street; 38°24′37″N 96°11′16″W	Emporia	
14	Snowden S. Mouse Service Station and Tourist Home	Snowden S. Mouse Service Station and Tourist Home	June 29, 2018 (#100002627)	413 E 6th Ave. & 526 N Exchange St. 38°24′18″N 96°10′29″W	Emporia	
15	Old Emporia Public Library	Old Emporia Public Library	November 2, 1981 (#81000279)	118 E. 6th St. 38°24′19″N 96°10′40″W	Emporia	
16	Mrs. Preston B. Plumb House	Mrs. Preston B. Plumb House	October 4, 1984 (#84000011)	224 E. 6th Ave. 38°24′19″N 96°10′36″W	Emporia	
17	Rocky Ford Bridge	Rocky Ford Bridge	December 22, 2020 (#100005953)	3.5m east of Commercial St. & East 6th Ave. 38°21′57″N 96°06′54″W	Emporia	
18	Soden's Grove Bridge	Soden's Grove Bridge	March 10, 1983 (#83000432)	K-57/K-99; 38°23′09″N 96°10′54″W	Emporia	
19	Hallie B. Soden House	Hallie B. Soden House	November 9, 1977 (#77000589)	802 S. Commercial St. 38°23′17″N 96°10′45″W	Emporia	
20	William Allen White House	William Allen White House	May 14, 1971 (#71000318)	927 Exchange St. 38°24′34″N 96°10′30″W	Emporia	

== See also ==
- List of National Historic Landmarks in Kansas
- National Register of Historic Places listings in Kansas
