= Bradford Hotel =

Bradford Hotel may refer to:

- Bradford Hotel (Sedan, Kansas), listed on the NRHP in Kansas
- Bradford Hotel (New York, New York)
- Bradford Hotel (Lisbon, North Dakota), listed on the NRHP in North Dakota
