= K-58 (Kansas highway) =

State highway in Kansas, U.S.

K-58
- K-58 highlighted in red

Route information
- Maintained by KDOT
- Length: 46.761 mi (75.255 km)
- Existed: September 20, 2004–present

Major junctions
- West end: K-99 west of Madison
- K-249 in Madison; US-75 between Gridley and Le Roy
- East end: US-169 near Colony

Location
- Country: United States
- State: Kansas
- Counties: Greenwood, Coffey, Anderson

Highway system
- Kansas State Highway System; Interstate; US; State; Spurs
← K-57	→ US-59

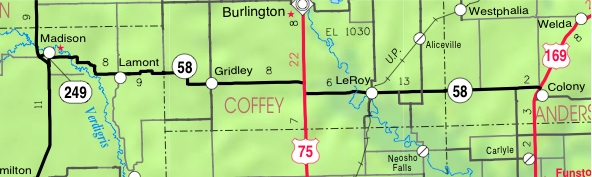
K-58 on the 2005-06 KDOT State Highway Map

K-58 is a 46.761-mile-long (75.255 km) east–west–west state highway in the U.S. state of Kansas. K-58's western terminus is at K-99 west of Madison. It runs east through Lamont and Gridley and after a short concurrency with US-75, it goes through LeRoy before ending at the eastern terminus at U.S. Route 169 (US-169) near Colony. It is one of the newer state highways in Kansas formed on September 20, 2004, when K-57 was truncated at K-4 in Dwight. The route changes were made because of K-57's long concurrencies with K-4, K-177, US-50 and K-99.

== Route description ==
K-58 begins at K-99 west of Madison, begins traveling east, and then enters Madison as West Madison Street. It continues through Madison, then turns south and follows 4th Street to the northern terminus of K-249. Here the highway turns eastward to follow Lincoln Street out of the city. As it exits Madison, it continues east for 1.5 miles (2.4 km), then crosses the Verdigris River. From here, it continues east 0.5 miles (0.80 km), turns south for 0.5 miles (0.80 km), then back east. The highway then crosses Halderman Creek, as it turns southeastward. It soon curves back east and after two miles (3.2 km), passes through Lamont. Just past Lamont, K-58 crosses Long Creek, then crosses into Coffey County three miles (4.8 km) later. Roughly two miles (3.2 km) into the county, the highway turns south for one mile (1.6 km), then back east. It continues east as it enters Gridley. It continues through the city for 1.8 miles (2.9 km) then exits the city. As it exits Gridley, it crosses Varvel Creek, as it continues east. Roughly 6.8 miles (10.9 km) east from here, it joins US-75, and the two routes head south. The two routes cross South Big Creek, then K-58 leaves the overlap and heads east. It continues for 4.5 miles (7.2 km), where it crosses the Neosho River, then shortly enters Le Roy. Within Le Roy, K-58 crosses the BNSF Railway, and then exits the city. About 5.9 miles (9.5 km) past Le Roy, the highway enters into Anderson County. About 1.8 miles (2.9 km) into the county it crosses Little Indian Creek then Indian Creek, 1.3 miles (2.1 km) later. It continues east from here another roughly 4.6 miles (7.4 km), where it intersects US-169 northwest of Colony.

The Kansas Department of Transportation (KDOT) tracks the traffic levels on its highways, and in 2018, they determined that on average the traffic varied from 325 vehicles just east of Lamont to 2410 vehicles on the overlap with US-75. The only section of K-58 included in the National Highway System is its overlap with US-75. The National Highway System is a system of highways important to the nation's defense, economy, and mobility. K-58 also connects to the National Highway System at its junction with US-169.

== History ==
=== Former designation ===
The first K-58 was formed in 1927, with its western terminus at US-50 northeast of Lenexa, and its eastern terminus at US-73E, or Metcalf Avenue.

By 1936, US-73E was renumbered as US-69, and K-58 was realigned. It began at US-50 near Lenexa, Kansas, and followed Metcalf Avenue/US-69 north to Southwest Boulevard (now Merriam Drive). It turned east to Antone Road (now 34th Street) near the Argentine neighborhood of Kansas City, Kansas, where it headed north to Strong Avenue. It turned east on Strong and headed north on (what is today) the Goddard Viaduct. It then headed east on Argentine Boulevard, crossed the Kansas River on the Argentine Bridge, and headed north on 18th Street to K-5, the Quindaro Boulevard, where it ended.

In 1956, the 18th Street Expressway was completed, allowing a rerouting of US-69 off of Southwest Boulevard. A new toll bridge over the Kansas River was built for the expressway, and the Argentine Bridge was demolished. K-58 then was rerouted to leave Metcalf and follow east on Shawnee Mission Parkway, then follow north on the 18th Street Expressway to K-5.

Due to the rerouting of US-50 out of downtown Mission, Kansas, K-158 was created. It ran on Johnson Drive from 18th Street Expressway to Metcalf.

In 1979, K-58 and K-158 were given to the cities of Roeland Park, Overland Park, and Mission, Kansas. K-58 became the first of several highways to be turned back, shortened, or realigned in Kansas City, as the Interstate highways were being completed.

In 1996, extensive reconstruction was completed in Roeland Park, Kansas, where K-58 formerly traveled. As a result, the former Skyline Drive interchange was transformed into an at-grade intersection, also eliminating the Skyline tunnel underneath the expressway. When this was completed, Johnson County, Kansas renamed the segment from Shawnee Mission Parkway to I-35 as "Roe Boulevard", a continuation of "Roe Avenue" from Fairway, Kansas to I-35.

=== New designation ===
The current K-58 was designated in a September 20, 2004 resolution. It replaced a former alignment of K-57, which was truncated to Dwight at this time.

== Major intersections ==
County	Location	mi	km	Destinations	Notes
Greenwood		0.000	0.000	K-99 – Olpe, Hamilton	Western terminus; road continues as 365th Street
Greenwood	Madison	0.573	0.922	K-249 south – Hamilton	Northern terminus of K-249
Coffey		25.677	41.323	US-75 north – Burlington	Western end of US-75 concurrency
Coffey		26.615	42.833	US-75 south – Yates Center	Eastern end of US-75 concurrency
Anderson		46.761	75.255	US-169 – Garnett, Iola	Eastern terminus; road continues as 400th Road
1.000 mi = 1.609 km; 1.000 km = 0.621 mi: Concurrency terminus
