= K58 =

K58 may refer to:

- K-58 (Kansas highway)
- K-58 trailer, an American military trailer
- French corvette Aconit (K58), a corvette of the Free French Navy
