= K158 =

K158 or K-158 may refer to:

- K-158 (Kansas highway), a former state highway in Kansas
- HMCS Saskatoon (K158), a former Canadian Navy ship
