= Lamont, Kansas =

Unincorporated community in Greenwood County, Kansas

- Unincorporated community
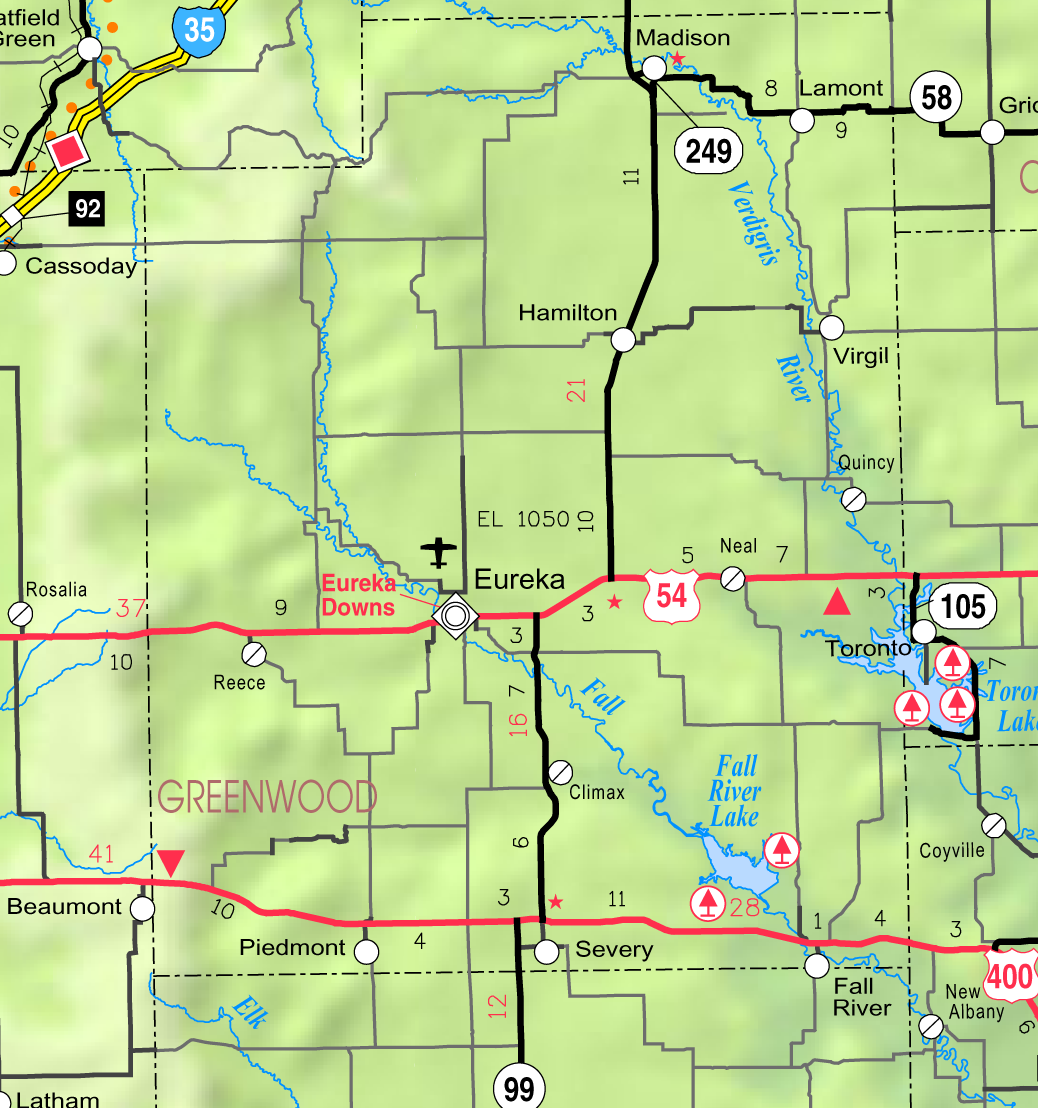
- KDOT map of Greenwood County (legend)

- Location within Kansas Location within the United States
- Coordinates: 38°06′45″N 96°01′36″W
- Country: United States
- State: Kansas
- County: Greenwood
- Platted: 1889
- Elevation: 1,125 ft (343 m)
- Time zone: UTC-6 (CST)
  - Summer (DST): UTC-5 (CDT)
- ZIP Code: 66855
- Area code: 620
- FIPS code: 20-38250
- GNIS ID: 478066

Lamont is an unincorporated community in northeastern Greenwood County, Kansas, United States. It is located approximately 5.5 miles east of the city of Madison along the K-58 highway.

== History ==
Lamont was laid out in about 1889. It was previously known as La Monts Mill.

The post office at Lamont was established in February 1888. Although Lamont is unincorporated, it has a post office, with the ZIP Code of 66855.

== Education ==
The community is served by Madison–Virgil USD 386 public school district.

Lamont High School was closed through school unification. The Lamont High School mascot was Cardinals.
