= Madison High School (Kansas) =

Location
- 1500 Southwest Blvd; Madison, Kansas 66860; 38°7′31.695″N 96°8′20.4936″W

Information
- Funding type: Public
- School board: BOE website
- School district: Madison–Virgil USD 386
- Superintendent: Ryan Bradbury
- Principal: Ryan Bradbury
- Teaching staff: 11.53 (FTE)
- Grades: 7-12
- Gender: coed
- Enrollment: 98 (2023–2024)
- Student to teacher ratio: 8.50
- Schedule type: Traditional
- Hours in school day: 7 hours, 15 minutes
- Colors: Black; Gold
- Athletics: Yes
- Athletics conference: Lyon County League
- Sports: Basketball, Cheerleading, Cross Country, Football, Golf, Track and Field, Volleyball
- Mascot: Bulldogs
- Nickname: Bulldogs
- Website: www.usd386.net

Madison High School is a fully accredited public high school located in Madison, Kansas, United States, and services students in grades 7 to 12. It is operated by Madison–Virgil USD 386 school district. The principal is Stu Moeckel. The school mascot is the Bulldogs and the school colors are black and gold.

== Extracurricular activities ==
The Bulldogs compete in the Lyon County League. The KSHSAA classification is 2A, the second lowest class. The school also has a variety of organizations for the students to participate in.

=== Athletics ===
The Bulldogs compete in the Lyon County League and are classified as 2A the second lowest classification in Kansas according to KSHSAA. Madison combines sports with Hamilton High School. A majority of the sports are coached by the same coaches. Madison High School offers the following sports:

Fall Sports

- Cheerleading
- Football
- Volleyball
- Cross Country

Winter

- Boys' Basketball
- Girls' Basketball
- Cheerleading

Spring

- Boys' Track and Field
- Girls' Track and Field

=== Organizations ===
- Agriculture Program
- Band
- National Honor Society (NHS)
- Scholars Bowl
- Student Council (StuCo)
- Yearbook

== See also ==
- List of high schools in Kansas
- List of unified school districts in Kansas
