= K-99 Wamego Bridge =

- Coordinates: 39°11′49″N 96°18′19″W
- Carries: 2 lanes of K-99
- Crosses: Kansas River
- Locale: Wamego, Kansas

Characteristics
- Design: steel girder

The K-99 Wamego Bridge is an automobile crossing of the Kansas River in Wamego, Kansas. It is the last Kansas River crossing until Manhattan 17 miles to the west. The bridge is 303.5 meters long.

The current structure is the second bridge at this location. The longest Marsh arch bridge ever built stood at this location from 1929 until 1990. The Marsh arch bridge, or rainbow bridge, was patented by James Barney Marsh and is a reinforced concrete arch bridge. The John Mack Bridge in Wichita, Kansas is now the longest remaining Marsh arch bridge.
