= Tallgrass Beef Company =

- Type: Limited liability company
- Industry: Beef
- Founded: 2005
- Headquarters: Sedan, Kansas, USA
- Key people: Bill Kurtis, Founder
- Products: Ground Beef, Steaks, Sausages, Hot dogs, Grass-fed beef
- Website: http://www.tallgrassbeef.com

Tallgrass Beef Company is a Kansas-based beef company that sells grass fed and grass finished beef. Tallgrass Beef became the first grass fed beef producer to sell steaks in Chicago in 2005 when Harry Caray’s Restaurant began selling Tallgrass Beef. Its beef is sold via restaurants and grocery stores throughout the Midwest, East Coast, and Southeast, in addition to mail order. Tallgrass Beef Company raises some of its cattle on founder Bill Kurtis's Sedan, Kansas ranch. Tallgrass also has a network of family farmers and ranchers who raise and finish grass fed cattle that fit the standards of the Tallgrass protocols.

== Beef production ==
Tallgrass' production process involves scientists employed by the company searching the United States for cattle whose genetics naturally causes the animal to fatten quickly and tenderly on grass. Beef producers have no databank of DNA with which to compare their findings, and so Tallgrass scientists use ultrasound technology to determine the tenderness of its potential herds.

The company philosophy places a greater emphasis on the quality of production than the feedlot system. In feedlot cattle operations, cattle are typically subjected to an aggressive growth hormones implant strategy in order to induce rapid growth of lean muscle. Cattle in feedlots are fed a formula feed that consists of 70% to 90% grain and are also injected with rounds of parasite treatments and fed low grade antibiotics to induce growth and negate diseases that spread in feedlots. Tallgrass’ cattle, on the other hand, are allowed to roam in open pastures without the space restrictions that feedlots impose on their cattle. Additionally, they are not implanted with any synthetic growth hormones, or fed animal by-products or antibiotics. Tallgrass has a policy of not using antibiotics in any of its cattle herds. In 2001, the American Medical Association stated that it opposed the regular use of antibiotics in all levels of livestock agriculture because of scientifically verified risk assessments.

== Non-payment to suppliers ==
In 2009, Tallgrass was fined $402,816 by the U.S. Department of Agriculture ($50,000 plus the amount owed to the suppliers) for failing to pay the full purchase price of livestock, operating as a packer without maintaining the required bond and engaging in business of a packer without meeting financial requirements set out by the Packers and Stockyards Act. The deadline for paying the suppliers was set to December 31, 2013.

Tallgrass paid its suppliers by January, 2014 including the fine of $50,000. The matter was settled in full.

== Forfeiture of Kansas LLC registration ==
On July 15, 2013, Tallgrass Beef Company, LLC forfeited its registration with the Kansas Secretary of State to do business in the state of Kansas.
