= Madison–Virgil USD 386 =

Public school district in Madison, Kansas

Address
- 1500 SW Blvd. Madison, Kansas, 66860; United States
- Coordinates: 38°7′29″N 96°8′15″W

District information
- Type: Public
- Grades: PreK to 12
- Superintendent: Ryan Bradbury
- Schools: 2

Other information
- Board of Education: BOE Website
- Website: usd386.net

Madison–Virgil USD 386 is a public unified school district headquartered in Madison, Kansas, United States. The district includes the communities of Madison, Virgil, Lamont, and nearby rural areas.

== Administration ==
It is currently under the administration of Superintendent Ryan Bradbury.

== Board of education ==
The Board of Education meets on the second Wednesday of each month.

== Schools ==
The school district operates the following schools:

- Madison High School
- Madison Junior High School
- Madison Elementary School

== See also ==
- Kansas State Department of Education
- Kansas State High School Activities Association
- List of high schools in Kansas
- List of unified school districts in Kansas
