= Hamilton USD 390 =

Public school district in Hamilton, Kansas

Address
- 2596 W. Road North Hamilton, Kansas, 66853; United States

District information
- Type: Public
- Grades: Pre-K to 12
- Schools: 2

Other information
- Website: hamilton390.com

Hamilton USD 390 is a public unified school district headquartered in Hamilton, Kansas, United States. The district includes the communities of Hamilton, Quincy, and nearby rural areas.

== Schools ==
The school district operates the following schools:

- Hamilton High School
- Hamilton Elementary School

== See also ==
- List of high schools in Kansas
- List of unified school districts in Kansas
- Kansas State Department of Education
- Kansas State High School Activities Association
