= K-158 (Kansas highway) =

Former state highway in Kansas, United States

K-158
- Former K-158 highlighted in red

Route information
- Maintained by KDOT
- Length: 1.6 mi (2.6 km)
- Existed: October 13, 1948–1979

Major junctions
- West end: US-69 in Mission
- East end: K-58 in Roeland Park

Location
- Country: United States
- State: Kansas
- Counties: Johnson

Highway system
- Kansas State Highway System; Interstate; US; State; Spurs
| ← K-157 | → US-159 |

K-158 was a 1.6-mile-long (2.6 km) Kansas highway that ran entirely through Mission, Kansas. K-158's western terminus was at U.S. Route 69 (US-69) in Mission and the eastern terminus was at K-58 in Roeland Park. It was turned back to the local authorities in 1979, and is now locally maintained Johnson Drive.

== Route description ==
K-158 began at an intersection with US-69 in Mission, and traveled eastward on Johnson Drive. It traveled one mile (1.6 km) past fast food restaurants and a few gas stations before intersecting Lamar Avenue, a city-maintained street. From here it continued east through a more residential are for another one mile (1.6 km), then intersected Nall Avenue. At Nall Avenue, it turned slightly northeast and continued for another one mile (1.6 km) before terminating at K-58 (modern Roe Avenue) in Roeland Park.

== History ==
In a resolution passed on October 13, 1948, it was approved to establish K-158 as a state highway.

K-158 was created when US-50 was rerouted on to the newly built Shawnee Mission Parkway in the 1950s. It ran on Johnson Drive from US-69 (Metcalf Avenue) east to K-58/18th Street Expressway (now Roe Avenue) in Roeland Park, Kansas.

It was given to the cities to maintain in 1979 since it existed entirely within the city limits of Mission, Kansas and Roeland Park, Kansas.

== Major intersections ==
The entire route was in Johnson County.

| Location | mi | km | Destinations | Notes |
|---|---|---|---|---|
| Mission | 0.0 | 0.0 | US-69 | Western terminus |
| Roeland Park | 1.6 | 2.6 | K-58 | Eastern terminus; road continued as ramps to and from US 56 / US 169 |
1.000 mi = 1.609 km; 1.000 km = 0.621 mi

== K-258 ==
K-258
- Location: Kansas City
- Length: 0.14 mi (230 m)
- Existed: July 10, 1957–1964

K-258 was a short 0.14-mile-long (0.23 km) state highway that linked K-158 to US-69 in Kansas City.
