= Axtell, Kansas =

City in Marshall County, Kansas

- City
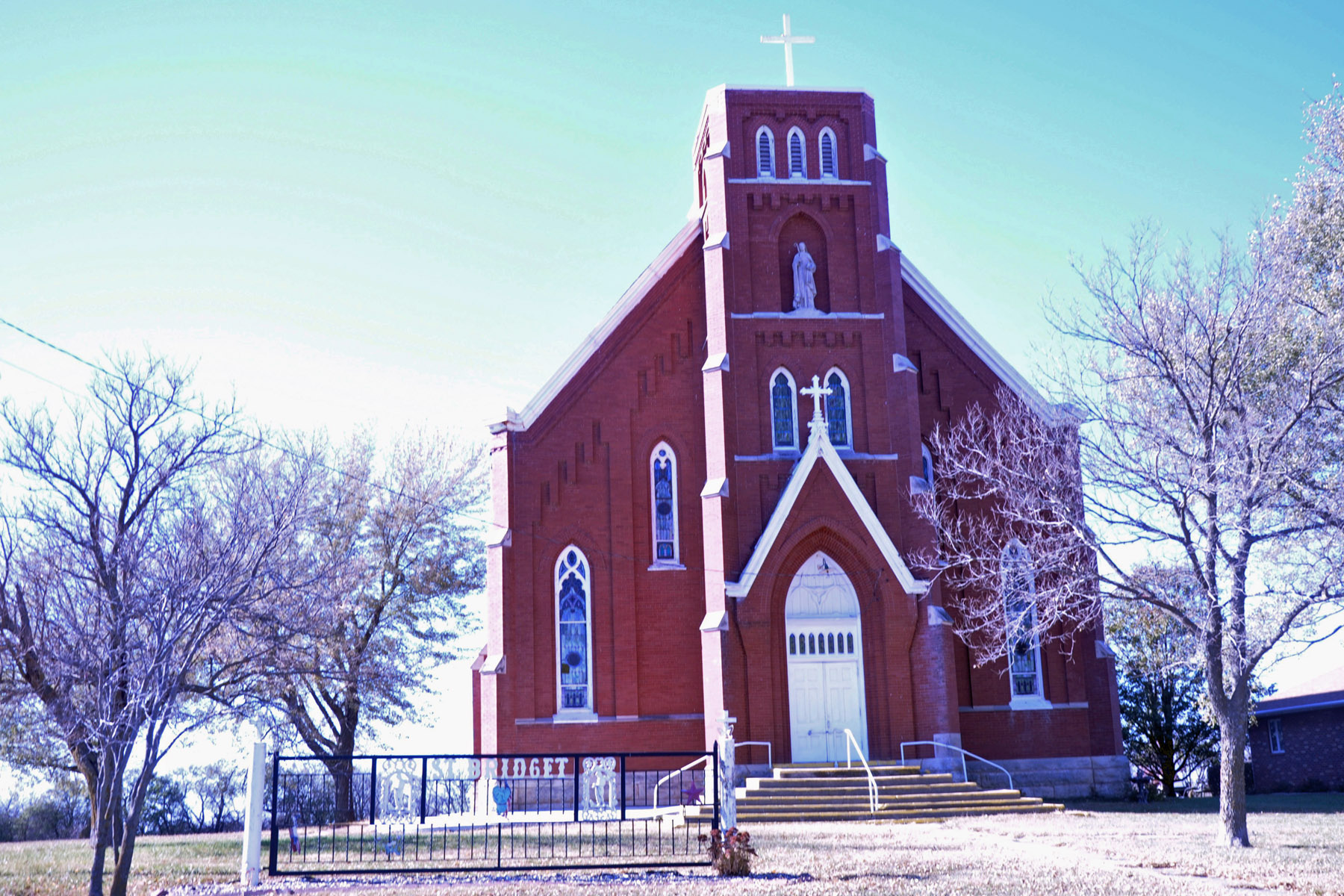
- St. Bridget Church (2020)

- Location within Marshall County and Kansas

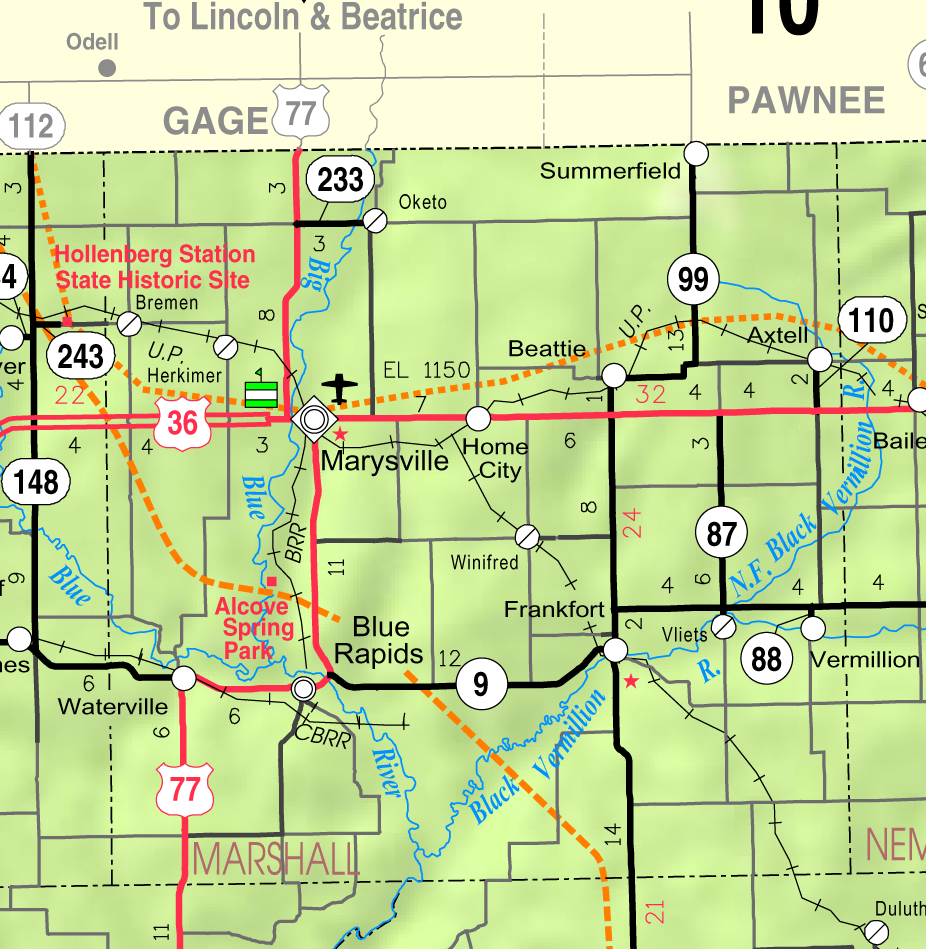
- KDOT map of Marshall County (legend)
- Coordinates: 39°52′21″N 96°15′26″W
- Country: United States
- State: Kansas
- County: Marshall
- Founded: 1860s
- Platted: 1872
- Incorporated: 1887
- Named for: Jesse Axtell

Area
  - Total: 0.53 sq mi (1.37 km^{2})
  - Land: 0.53 sq mi (1.36 km^{2})
  - Water: 0.0039 sq mi (0.01 km^{2})
- Elevation: 1,348 ft (411 m)

Population (2020)
  - Total: 399
  - Density: 760/sq mi (293/km^{2})
- Time zone: UTC-6 (CST)
  - Summer (DST): UTC-5 (CDT)
- ZIP Code: 66403
- Area code: 785
- FIPS code: 20-03600
- GNIS ID: 2394045
- Website: axtellks.com

Axtell is a city in Marshall County, Kansas, United States. As of the 2020 census, the population of the city was 399.

== History ==
The first settlements were made at Axtell in the 1860s. The first post office in Axtell was established in December 1871. Axtell was laid out in 1872 when the railroad was extended to that point, and a railroad depot was built that year. It was named for Jesse Axtell, a railroad official.

== Geography ==
According to the United States Census Bureau, the city has a total area of 0.51 square miles (1.32 km^{2}), all land.

=== Climate ===
This climatic region is typified by large seasonal temperature differences, with warm to hot (and often humid) summers and cold (sometimes severely cold) winters. According to the Köppen Climate Classification system, Axtell has a humid continental climate, abbreviated "Dfa" on climate maps.

== Demographics ==
Historical population
Census	Pop.	Note	%±
1880	255		—
1890	643		152.2%
1900	651		1.2%
1910	748		14.9%
1920	617		−17.5%
1930	607		−1.6%
1940	545		−10.2%
1950	510		−6.4%
1960	493		−3.3%
1970	456		−7.5%
1980	470		3.1%
1990	432		−8.1%
2000	445		3.0%
2010	406		−8.8%
2020	399		−1.7%
U.S. Decennial Census

=== 2020 census ===
The 2020 United States census counted 399 people, 172 households, and 98 families in Axtell. The population density was 762.9 per square mile (294.6/km^{2}). There were 194 housing units at an average density of 370.9 per square mile (143.2/km^{2}). The racial makeup was 90.98% (363) white or European American (90.98% non-Hispanic white), 0.25% (1) black or African-American, 0.0% (0) Native American or Alaska Native, 1.75% (7) Asian, 0.0% (0) Pacific Islander or Native Hawaiian, 1.25% (5) from other races, and 5.76% (23) from two or more races. Hispanic or Latino of any race was 2.01% (8) of the population.

Of the 172 households, 24.4% had children under the age of 18; 45.9% were married couples living together; 22.7% had a female householder with no spouse or partner present. 37.2% of households consisted of individuals and 21.5% had someone living alone who was 65 years of age or older. The average household size was 2.7 and the average family size was 3.4. The percent of those with a bachelor's degree or higher was estimated to be 12.5% of the population.

28.6% of the population was under the age of 18, 5.5% from 18 to 24, 23.8% from 25 to 44, 23.6% from 45 to 64, and 18.5% who were 65 years of age or older. The median age was 38.1 years. For every 100 females, there were 95.6 males. For every 100 females ages 18 and older, there were 100.7 males.

The 2016–2020 5-year American Community Survey estimates show that the median household income was $52,500 (with a margin of error of +/- $18,480) and the median family income was $71,750 (+/- $17,063). Males had a median income of $29,375 (+/- $9,112) versus $27,250 (+/- $8,274) for females. The median income for those above 16 years old was $28,833 (+/- $6,244). Approximately, 5.0% of families and 5.6% of the population were below the poverty line, including 6.3% of those under the age of 18 and 6.0% of those ages 65 or over.

=== 2010 census ===
As of the census of 2010, there were 406 people, 178 households, and 111 families residing in the city. The population density was 796.1 inhabitants per square mile (307.4/km^{2}). There were 194 housing units at an average density of 380.4 per square mile (146.9/km^{2}). The racial makeup of the city was 96.8% White and 3.2% from two or more races.

There were 178 households, of which 24.7% had children under the age of 18 living with them, 52.8% were married couples living together, 5.6% had a female householder with no husband present, 3.9% had a male householder with no wife present, and 37.6% were non-families. 33.1% of all households were made up of individuals, and 16.3% had someone living alone who was 65 years of age or older. The average household size was 2.28 and the average family size was 2.95.

The median age in the city was 43 years. 25.1% of residents were under the age of 18; 6.9% were between the ages of 18 and 24; 19.7% were from 25 to 44; 25.1% were from 45 to 64; and 23.2% were 65 years of age or older. The gender makeup of the city was 51.7% male and 48.3% female.

== Education ==
The community is served by Prairie Hills USD 113 public school district, formed in 2010 by the merger of Sabetha USD 441 and Axtell USD 488.
