= Quincy, Kansas =

Unincorporated community in Greenwood County, Kansas

- Unincorporated community
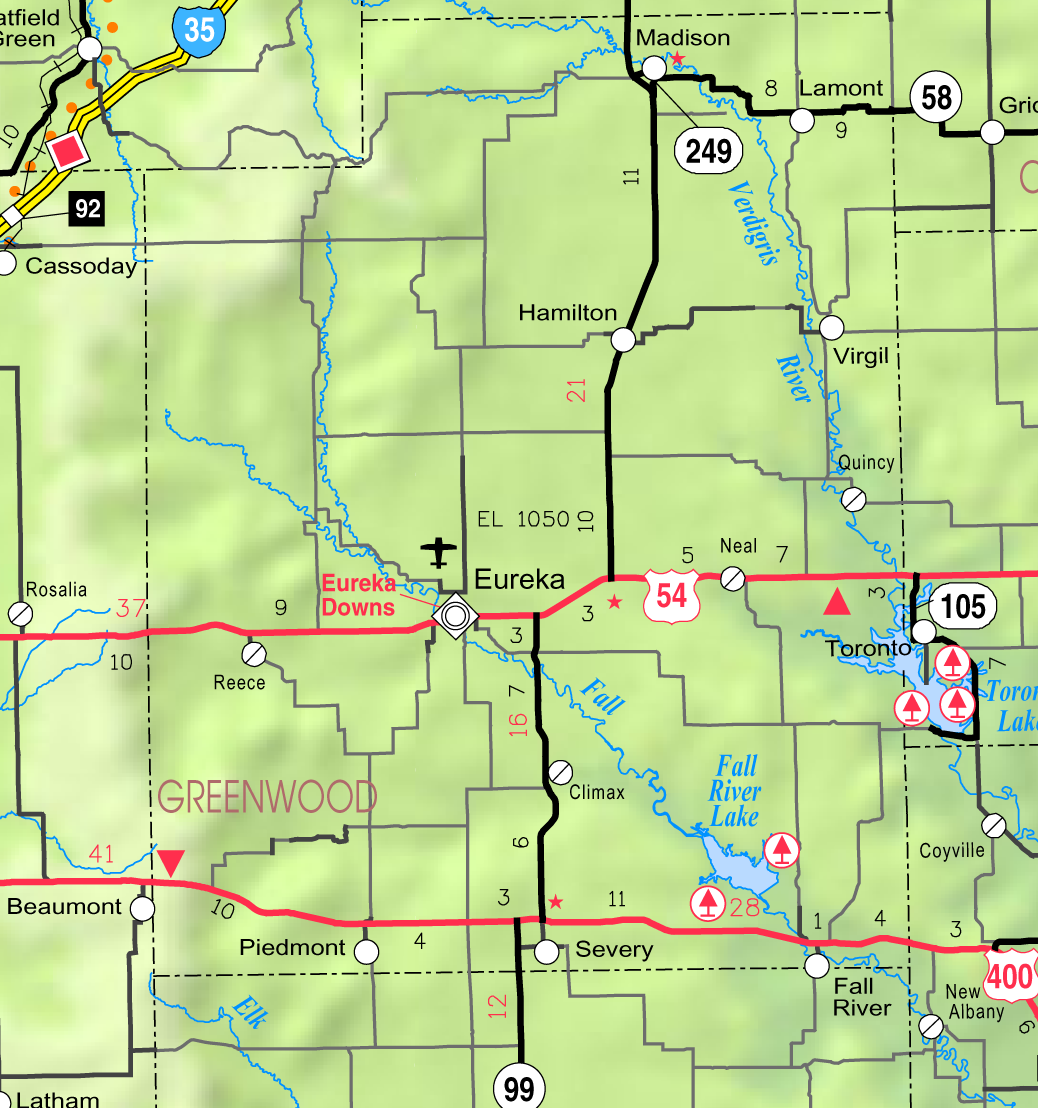
- KDOT map of Greenwood County (legend)

- Location within Kansas Location within the United States
- Coordinates: 37°52′55″N 95°59′34″W
- Country: United States
- State: Kansas
- County: Greenwood
- Elevation: 942 ft (287 m)
- Time zone: UTC-6 (CST)
  - Summer (DST): UTC-5 (CDT)
- Area code: 620
- FIPS code: 20-58150
- GNIS ID: 474454

Quincy is an unincorporated community in Greenwood County, Kansas, United States. It is located between Eureka and Yates Center in a rural area.

== History ==
A post office was opened in Quincy in 1869, and remained in operation until it was discontinued in 1975. In the mid-20th Century, after surviving a severe flood of the Verdigris River, it had a bank, school, church, grocery store, and telephone exchange. The Great Depression and World War II II led to the migration of many to larger communities in search of work, particularly in the war factories in the region, especially Wichita.

== Education ==
This community and nearby rural areas are served by Hamilton USD 390 public school district.
