= Dr. John Quincy Howe House =

Historic house in New York, United States

- U.S. National Register of Historic Places
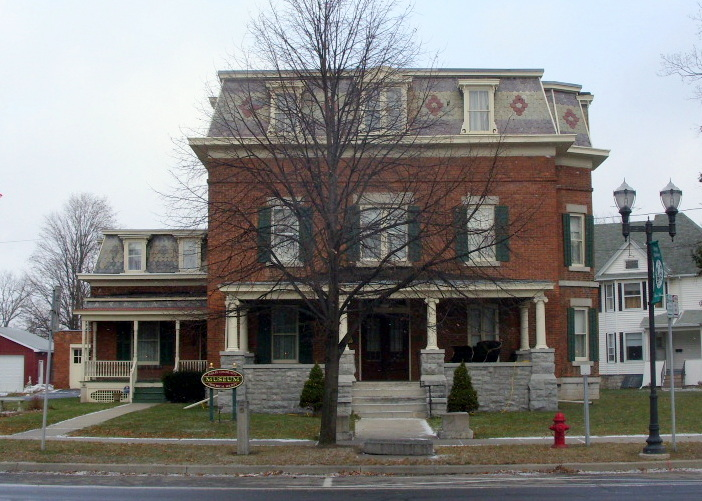
- Dr. John Quincy Howe House, December 2008

- Location within New York Location within the United States
- Location: 66 Main St., Phelps, New York
- Coordinates: 42°57′26″N 77°3′22″W
- Area: less than one acre
- Built: 1869
- Built by: Barlow, Moses
- Architectural style: Second Empire
- NRHP reference No.: 01001564
- Added to NRHP: February 5, 2002

The Dr. John Quincy Howe House is a notable house located in Phelps, New York. Listed on the National Register of Historic Places, the house is thought to be the only house in the state of New York with a two-story privy and the only house in the United States with a two-story brick privy.

The house is owned by the Phelps Community Historical Society and is operated as a museum.

== History ==
It was built in 1869 by Moses Barlow on the site of a former tavern, and is a 2 1/2-story, Second Empire style brick dwelling with a slate mansard roof. The house has several asymmetrically placed side and rear wings. It features a two-story six-hole (three up, three down) privy thought to be the only house with such a structure. Access to the unique feature can be obtained from both levels of the house.

It was listed on the National Register of Historic Places in 2001.

The house was purchased by an anonymous donor in 1999 and presented as a gift to the Phelps Community Historical Society. The house has been renovated and is now open to the public for tours.
