= Emmett Kelly Museum =

Museum in Sedan, Kansas, USA

Coordinates: 37°07′37″N 96°11′07″W

The Emmett Kelly Museum in Sedan, Kansas, nominally honors their native son, the famed hobo circus clown. The museum opened in 1967 In a story told by Larry Runyon, Emmett Kelly came to the dedication of the Emmett Kelly Museum. At the dedication he leaned over to the Mayor and told him they had purchased the wrong house. He was born in the house across the street. Red faced the Mayor replied back "Don't tell anyone!" The museum was moved into the historic Sedan Opera House in 1980, where it resides today.

The Emmett Kelly Museum houses a mix of local memorabilia along with a few Kelly-related items, but its main attraction is the world's largest collection of commemorative Jim Beam bottles, some 1,500, donated by a couple who once took them on tour.
