= Bradford Hotel (Sedan, Kansas) =

- U.S. National Register of Historic Places
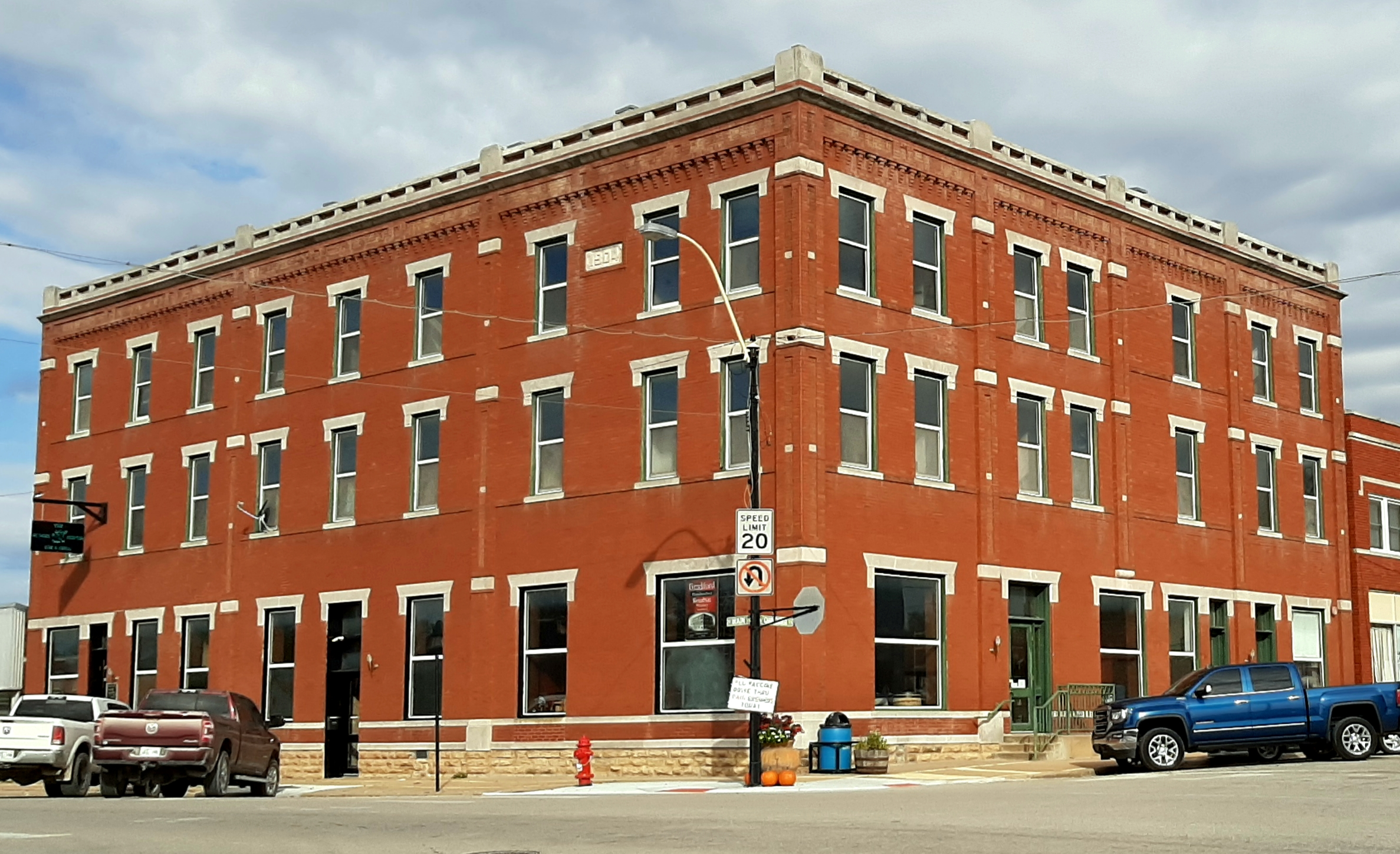
- The Bradford Hotel in 2020

- Location within Kansas Location within the United States
- Location: 103 N Chautauqua, Sedan, Kansas
- Coordinates: 37°07′37″N 96°11′13″W
- Area: less than one acre
- Built: 1904
- Built by: Denick, A.J.; Smith, Tot
- Architectural style: Early Commercial
- NRHP reference No.: 07001222
- Added to NRHP: November 28, 2007

The Bradford Hotel in Sedan, Kansas, was built in 1904. It was listed on the National Register of Historic Places in 2007.

It is Early Commercial in style. It has also been known as the Huffman Hotel. It was built as a 38-room hotel.

It was deemed notable "for its significance to the development of downtown Sedan. The hotel was constructed during a time of economic boom following the discovery nearby of oil and gas. Businessmen and workers associated with the oil, gas, and cattle industries that have been integral to the local economy frequented the hotel during its seventy years in operation."
