= Shawnee Mission Parkway =

Major road in Kansas

Coordinates: 39.0512°N 94.7245°W

- Length: 14.0 mi (22.5 km)
- West end: K-7 in Shawnee, Kansas
- East end: US 56 (Ward Parkway) in Kansas City, Missouri

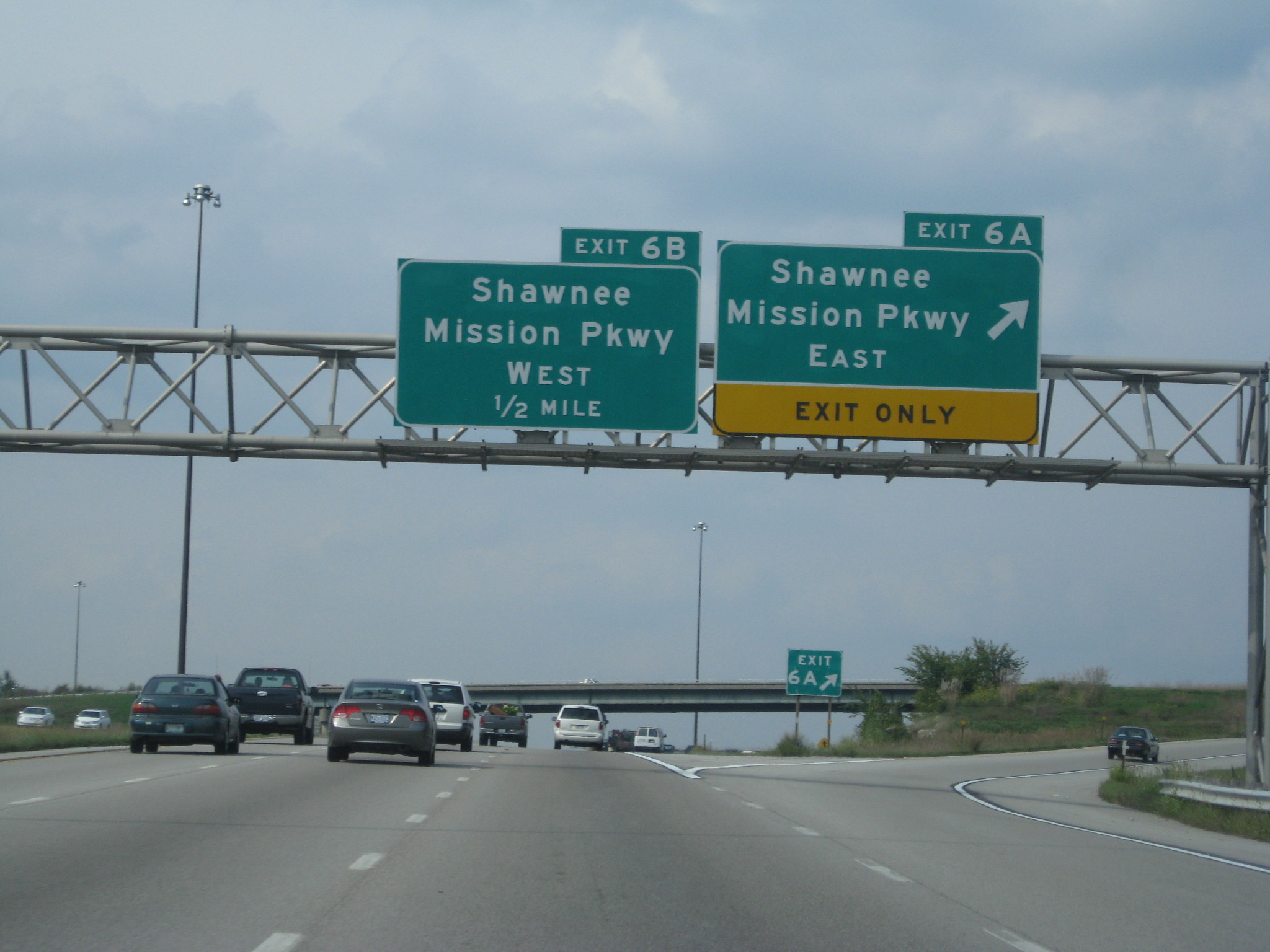
I-435 at exits 6A–B for Shawnee Mission Parkway

Shawnee Mission Parkway is a stretch of roadway in Johnson County, Kansas and Jackson County, Missouri (only a fragment). Its western terminus at K-7 in Shawnee, Kansas and its eastern terminus at Ward Parkway in Kansas City, Missouri. The roadway is signed as US 56 from Interstate 35 to its eastern terminus, with US-69 overlapping from I-35 to Metcalf Avenue, and US-169 overlapping from I-35 to Rainbow Boulevard.

The Shawnee Mission Parkway mainly functions to connect the main cities included in the Shawnee Mission, KS mailing address. All of the cities it passes through in Kansas are included in the mailing address.

== Route description ==
The Shawnee Mission Parkway begins at a full cloverleaf interchange at K-7 near Zarah and heads east as a four-lane divided highway. East of Zarah, it interchanges I-435 at a partial cloverleaf interchange. It then enters Shawnee as an expressway and continues east as 63rd St. East of Shawnee, it interchanges I-35 and becomes concurrent with US 56, US 69, and US 169. Near Mission, US 69 splits from the Shawnee Mission Parkway at a cloverleaf interchange and continues north as US 56 and US 169 continue east with the Shawnee Mission Parkway. Passing by Westwood, US 169 splits from the Shawnee Mission Parkway and heads north at an intersection. The route then crosses into Missouri and reaches its eastern terminus at a small interchange with Ward Parkway as US 56 continues northeast along Ward Parkway.

== History ==
Shawnee Mission Parkway was once concurrent with K-10 as it followed from K-7 to Merriam Drive. From I-35 to US 56, a part of the route was K-10 Spur. When the current K-10 expressway was originally completed between K-7 and I-435, it was originally signed as K-12. When the entire expressway was completed from Lawrence to I-435 in Lenexa, K-10 was signed for the entire freeway, and K-12 was realigned to follow the old K-10 routing on Shawnee Mission Parkway to Merriam Drive. The former Spur K-10 was then resigned as Spur K-12. K-12 was decommissioned in 1992. US 50 used to also follow Shawnee Mission Parkway from I-35 into Missouri. When I-435 was completed, US 50 was rerouted to overlap I-435 into Missouri. From Metcalf Avenue in Overland Park to Roe Avenue in Mission, the Shawnee Mission Parkway was assigned as K-58 until its 1979 decommissioning.

== Major intersections ==
All exits are unnumbered.

County	Location	mi	km	Destinations	Notes
Johnson	Shawnee	0.0	0.0	K-7	Western terminus
Johnson	Shawnee	3.7	6.0	I-435 – Kansas City	
Johnson	Merriam	8.7	14.0	I-35 / US-56 west / US-69 south / US-169 south – Wichita, Kansas City	Western end of US 56, US 69, and US 169 concurrency
Johnson	Mission	10.1	16.3	US-69 north (Metcalf Avenue) to I-635	Interchange, eastern end of US 69 concurrency
Johnson	Mission	13.6	21.9	US-169 north (Rainbow Boulevard)	Eastern end of US 169 concurrency
Johnson	Westwood Hills	13.8	22.2	State Line Rd.	State line; road crosses into Missouri
Jackson	Kansas City	14.0	22.5	US 56 east (Bush Creek Parkway)	Eastern terminus; US 56 continues along Ward Parkway
1.000 mi = 1.609 km; 1.000 km = 0.621 mi: Concurrency terminus
