= St. Bridget Church =

Historic church in Kansas, United States

- U.S. National Register of Historic Places
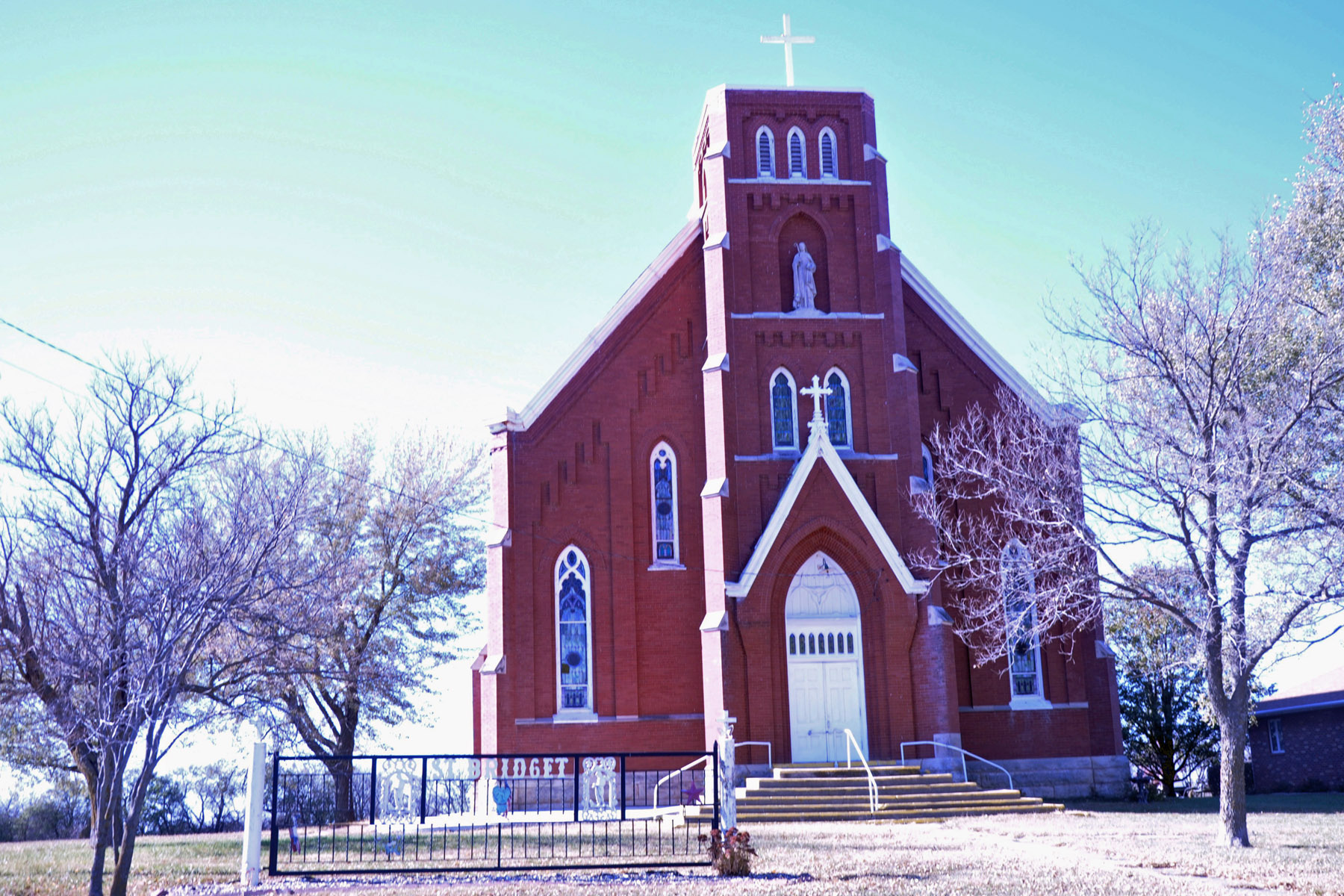

- Location within Kansas Location within the United States
- Nearest city: Axtell, Kansas
- Coordinates: 39°57′58″N 96°15′48″W
- Area: 6.5 acres (2.6 ha)
- Built: 1902-1908
- Architectural style: Late Gothic Revival
- NRHP reference No.: 96001011
- Added to NRHP: September 12, 1996

The St. Bridget Church is a church in Axtell, Kansas, United States. It was added to the National Register of Historic Places in 1996. The church was closed in 1967 by the Archdiocese of Kansas City, and in 1972 the building was transferred to the St. Bridget Historical Society to prevent its demolition.

It is a red brick 50 by 100 feet (15 m × 30 m) church which is one of the oldest Gothic buildings surviving in northeast Kansas.
