= Red Rocks State Historic Site =

Historic house in Emporia, Kansas, USA

- William Allen White House
- U.S. National Register of Historic Places
- U.S. National Historic Landmark
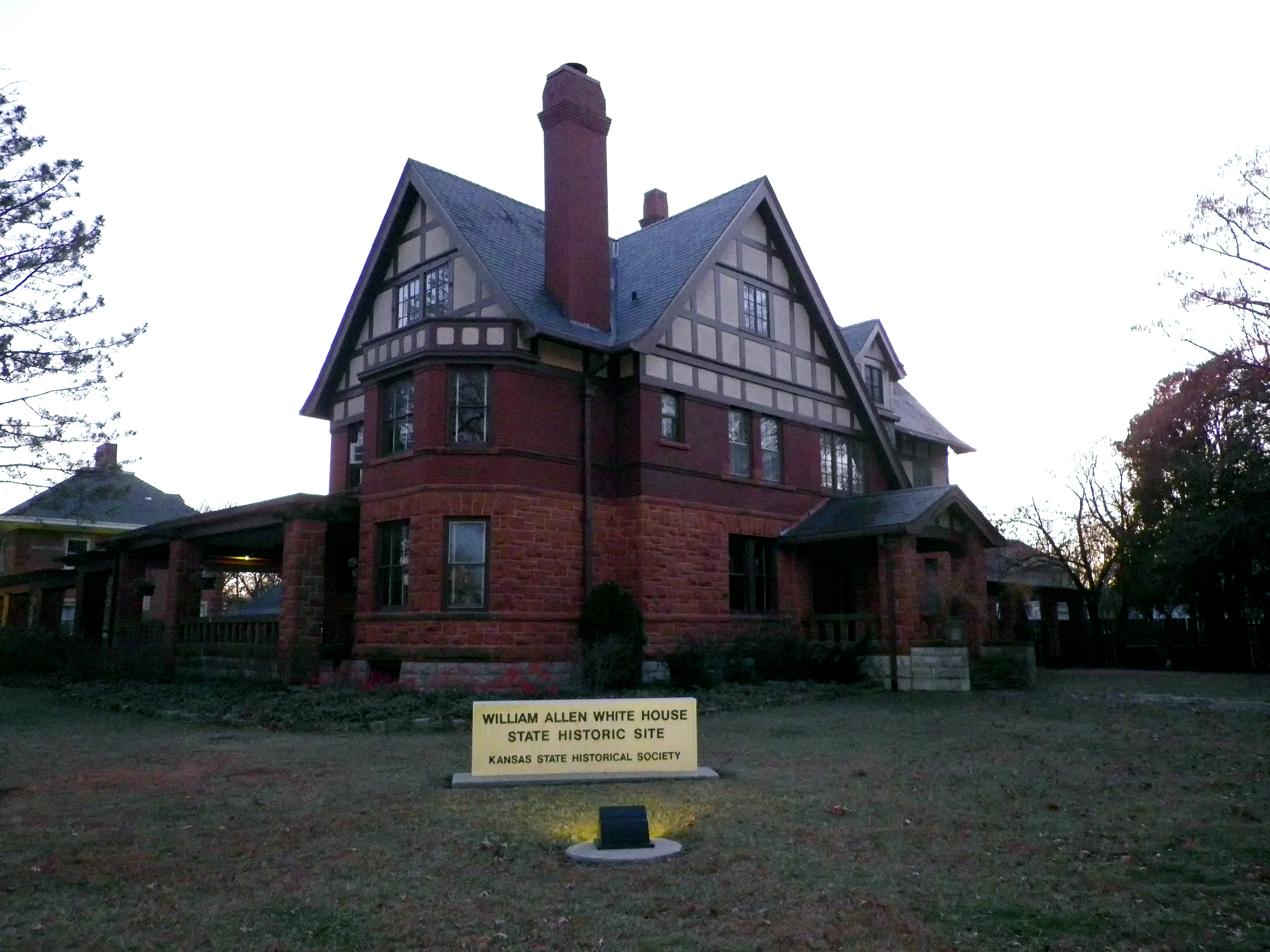
- House in December 2009

- Location within Kansas Location within the United States
- Interactive map showing the location of William Allen White House
- Location: 927 Exchange St., Emporia, Kansas
- Coordinates: 38°24′34.6″N 96°10′31.5″W
- Area: less than one acre
- Built: 1887
- Architect: Wight & Wight
- Architectural style: Tudor Revival; Craftsman; Classical Revival
- NRHP reference No.: 71000318

Significant dates
- Added to NRHP: May 14, 1971
- Designated NHL: May 11, 1976

The Red Rocks State Historic Site is a Kansas historic site at 927 Exchange Street in Emporia, Kansas. It preserves the William Allen White House, also known as Red Rocks, which was the home of Progressive journalist William Allen White from 1899 until his death in 1944. The house was declared a National Historic Landmark in 1976. The property, designated a state historic site in 2001, is operated by the Kansas Historical Society.

== Description and history ==
Red Rocks is located in a residential area northeast of downtown Emporia, at the southwest corner of Exchange Street and East 10th Avenue. The landscaped property includes the house of William Allen White, the house of his mother Mary, and a small visitors center. The main house is a 2 1/2-story structure, its first floor finished in red sandstone, and the upper levels framed in wood with a Tudor Revival stucco-and-half-timbered appearance. The Mother's House is a 2 1/2-story brick and limestone structure, with Classical Revival styling on what is basically an American Foursquare plan.

Construction of the main house was begun in 1887 by Judge Almerin Gillette, but was not completed due to financial difficulties. The stone for the exterior was sourced from the Garden of the Gods area in Colorado. William Allen White and his wife Sallie purchased the unfinished shell in 1899 and finished the interior. The upper floors of the house were gutted by a fire in 1920, and rebuilt to a plan by the Kansas City architects Wight & Wight. The Mother's House was built in 1903 or 1904, and was occupied by White's mother Mary until her death in 1924. The main house remained in the White family (owned by a foundation from 1988) until 2001, when it was donated to the state.

William Allen White became a prominent national figure due to his writing for the Emporia Gazette (which he owned and edited), and for his role in organizing the progressive elements of the Republican Party in the first three decades of the 20th century. He helped organize the Bull Moose Party candidacy of Theodore Roosevelt in 1912, and was an influential voice representing small-town America.

== See also ==
- List of National Historic Landmarks in Kansas
- National Register of Historic Places listings in Lyon County, Kansas
