= Bradford Hotel (Lisbon, North Dakota) =

- U.S. National Register of Historic Places
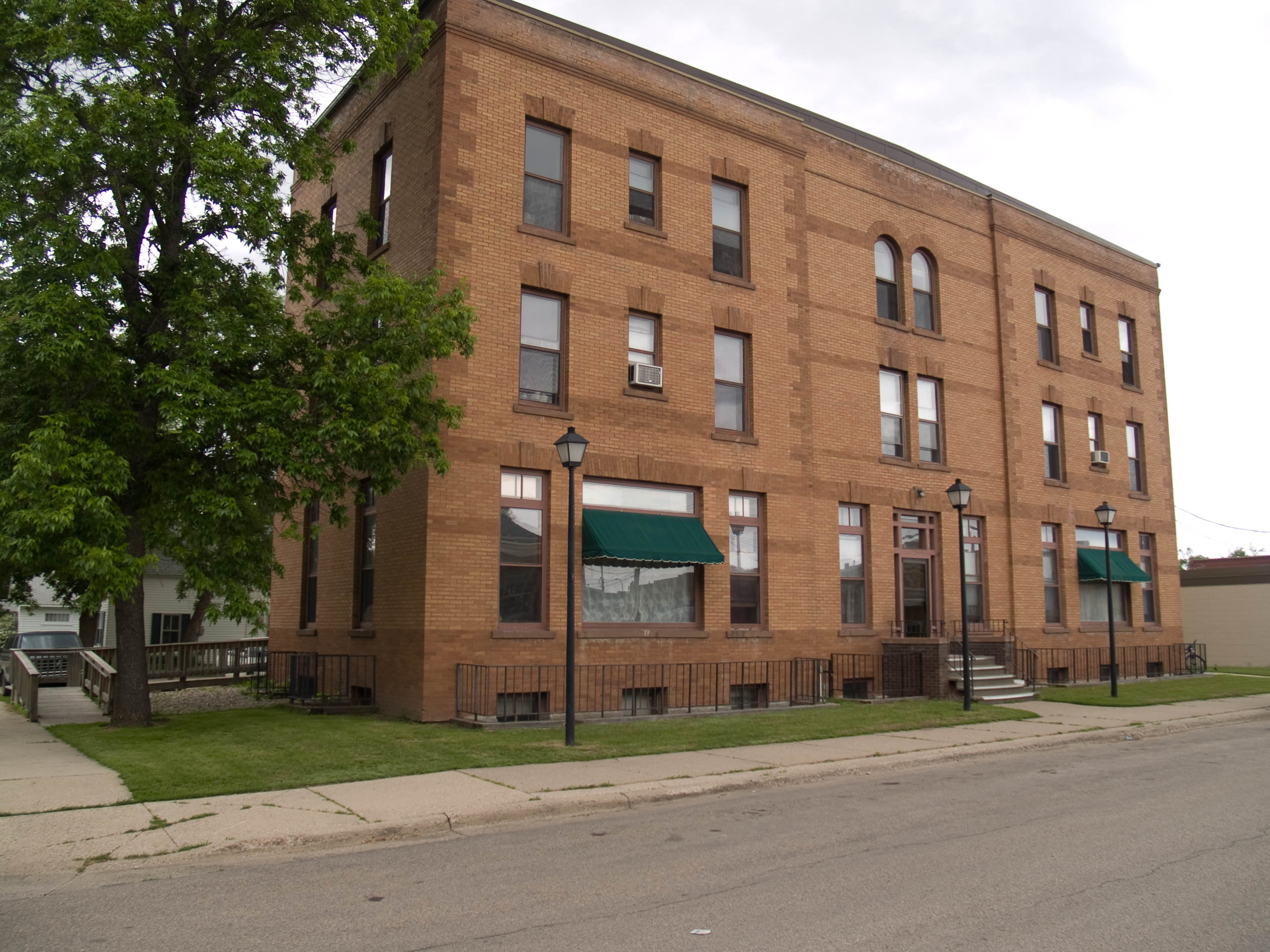

- Location within North Dakota Location within the United States
- Location: 18 Fourth Ave. W., Lisbon, North Dakota
- Coordinates: 46°26′34″N 97°40′56″W
- Area: less than one acre
- Built: 1909
- Architectural style: Late 19th And 20th Century Revivals, Federal Revival
- NRHP reference No.: 87001766
- Added to NRHP: October 1, 1987

The Bradford Hotel in Lisbon, North Dakota was built in 1909. It has also been known as the Lisbon Hotel.

It was listed on the National Register of Historic Places in 1987.

It was built for approximately $25,000 in 1909.
