= Emporia Downtown Historic District =

Historic district in Kansas, United States

- U.S. National Register of Historic Places
- U.S. Historic district
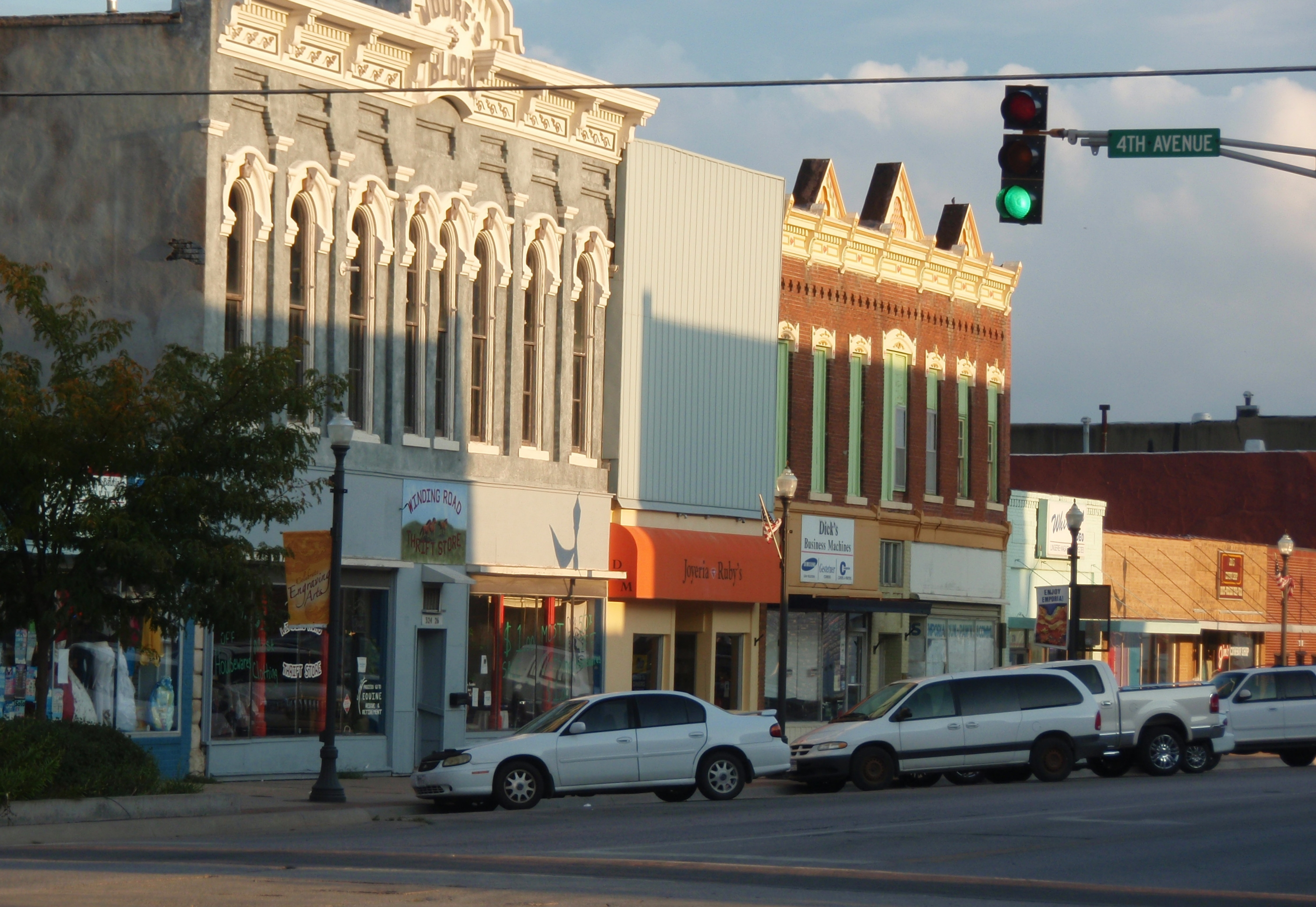

- Location within Kansas Location within the United States
- Location: Generally bounded by 10th & 3rd Aves., Mechanic & Merchant Sts., Emporia, Kansas
- Coordinates: 38°24′20″N 96°10′49″W
- Area: 67 acres (27 ha)
- NRHP reference No.: 12000249
- Added to NRHP: May 1, 2012

The Emporia Downtown Historic District is a historic district which was listed on the National Register of Historic Places in 2012.

The district covers about 18 city blocks. Its 67 acres (27 ha) listed area included 115 contributing buildings and 52 non-contributing buildings. Two already-listed resources were included.

It includes a number of two- and three-story Italianate-style buildings from the 1860s, built soon after Emporia was founded in 1857.
