= Sedan, Kansas =

City in Chautauqua County, Kansas

- City and County seat
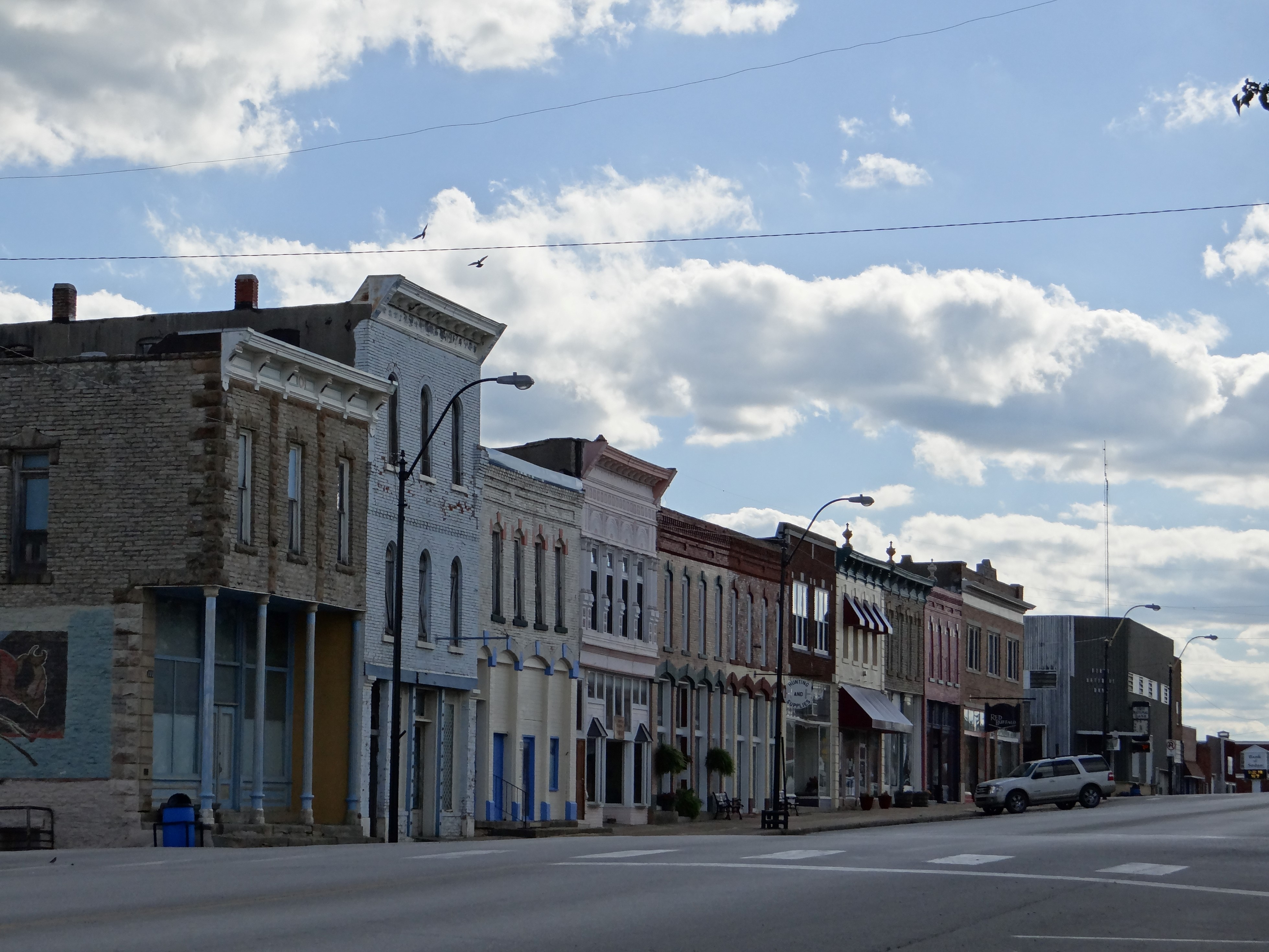
- Downtown Sedan (2013)

- Location within Chautauqua County and Kansas

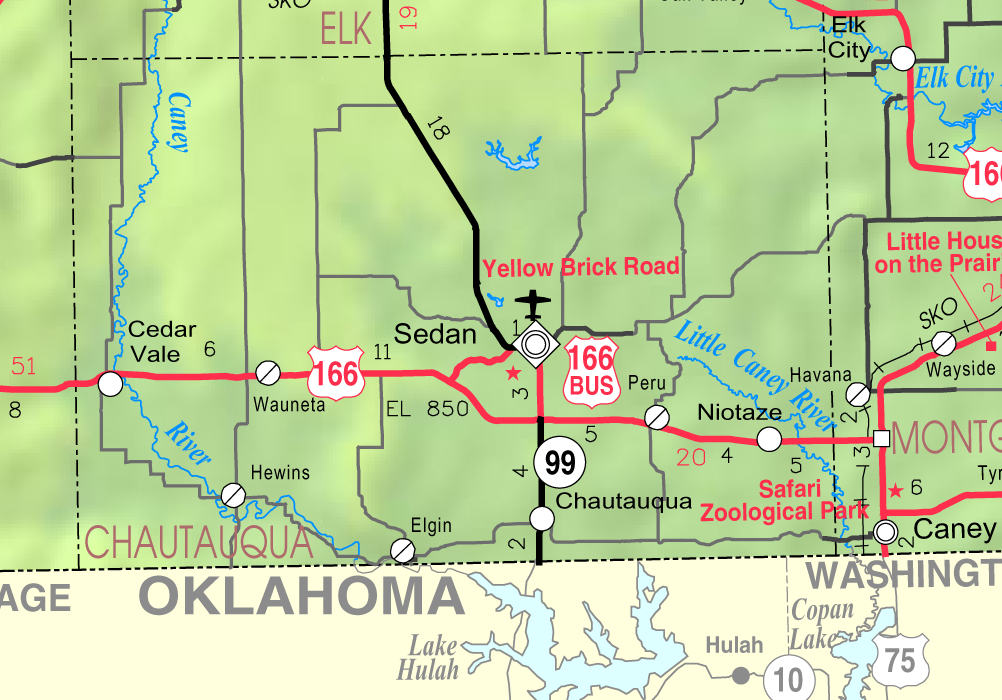
- KDOT map of Chautauqua County (legend)
- Coordinates: 37°07′42″N 96°11′05″W
- Country: United States
- State: Kansas
- County: Chautauqua
- Founded: 1871
- Incorporated: 1876
- Named for: Battle of Sedan

Area
  - Total: 0.82 sq mi (2.13 km^{2})
  - Land: 0.82 sq mi (2.13 km^{2})
  - Water: 0 sq mi (0.00 km^{2})
- Elevation: 863 ft (263 m)

Population (2020)
  - Total: 1,000
  - Density: 1,200/sq mi (470/km^{2})
- Time zone: UTC-6 (CST)
  - Summer (DST): UTC-5 (CDT)
- ZIP Code: 67361
- Area code: 620
- FIPS code: 20-63750
- GNIS ID: 2396569
- Website: cityofsedan.com

Sedan is the county seat of and the largest city in Chautauqua County, Kansas, United States. As of the 2020 census, the population of the city was 1,000.

== History ==
Sedan was founded in 1871. The initial settlement was named after the French city of Sedan, then the stage of the 1870 Battle of Sedan of the Franco-Prussian War. In 1875, it was chosen as the county seat. Sedan was incorporated as a city in 1876.

== Geography ==
According to the United States Census Bureau, the city has a total area of 0.81 square miles (2.10 km^{2}), all of it land.

=== Climate ===
The climate in this area is characterized by hot, humid summers and generally mild to cool winters. According to the Köppen Climate Classification system, Sedan has a humid subtropical climate, abbreviated "Cfa" on climate maps.

Climate data for Sedan, Kansas, 1991–2020 normals, extremes 1893–present
Month	Jan	Feb	Mar	Apr	May	Jun	Jul	Aug	Sep	Oct	Nov	Dec	Year
Record high °F (°C)	80 (27)	89 (32)	95 (35)	99 (37)	100 (38)	108 (42)	118 (48)	116 (47)	113 (45)	101 (38)	88 (31)	82 (28)	118 (48)
Mean maximum °F (°C)	69.4 (20.8)	74.2 (23.4)	80.5 (26.9)	86.5 (30.3)	89.8 (32.1)	94.3 (34.6)	100.4 (38.0)	101.3 (38.5)	96.7 (35.9)	87.6 (30.9)	78.4 (25.8)	69.5 (20.8)	102.8 (39.3)
Mean daily maximum °F (°C)	45.5 (7.5)	50.5 (10.3)	60.1 (15.6)	69.5 (20.8)	77.2 (25.1)	85.7 (29.8)	91.5 (33.1)	91.3 (32.9)	83.1 (28.4)	72.0 (22.2)	59.3 (15.2)	48.1 (8.9)	69.5 (20.8)
Daily mean °F (°C)	33.6 (0.9)	37.8 (3.2)	47.2 (8.4)	56.7 (13.7)	65.9 (18.8)	75.0 (23.9)	80.1 (26.7)	79.1 (26.2)	70.6 (21.4)	58.9 (14.9)	46.7 (8.2)	36.6 (2.6)	57.4 (14.1)
Mean daily minimum °F (°C)	21.6 (−5.8)	25.1 (−3.8)	34.4 (1.3)	44.0 (6.7)	54.5 (12.5)	64.2 (17.9)	68.8 (20.4)	66.8 (19.3)	58.1 (14.5)	45.8 (7.7)	34.1 (1.2)	25.1 (−3.8)	45.2 (7.3)
Mean minimum °F (°C)	5.1 (−14.9)	10.0 (−12.2)	18.1 (−7.7)	30.2 (−1.0)	40.3 (4.6)	54.3 (12.4)	60.4 (15.8)	57.6 (14.2)	44.2 (6.8)	30.2 (−1.0)	19.0 (−7.2)	9.2 (−12.7)	1.3 (−17.1)
Record low °F (°C)	−27 (−33)	−24 (−31)	−7 (−22)	11 (−12)	25 (−4)	40 (4)	47 (8)	42 (6)	30 (−1)	12 (−11)	3 (−16)	−15 (−26)	−27 (−33)
Average precipitation inches (mm)	1.29 (33)	1.73 (44)	2.80 (71)	4.30 (109)	6.15 (156)	5.58 (142)	3.82 (97)	3.50 (89)	3.52 (89)	3.84 (98)	2.15 (55)	1.86 (47)	40.54 (1,030)
Average snowfall inches (cm)	2.4 (6.1)	2.2 (5.6)	1.7 (4.3)	0.1 (0.25)	0.0 (0.0)	0.0 (0.0)	0.0 (0.0)	0.0 (0.0)	0.0 (0.0)	0.0 (0.0)	0.3 (0.76)	2.6 (6.6)	9.3 (23.61)
Average precipitation days (≥ 0.01 in)	5.6	6.1	8.3	9.6	11.0	9.4	8.0	7.7	7.1	7.2	6.1	5.8	91.9
Average snowy days (≥ 0.1 in)	1.8	1.2	0.7	0.1	0.0	0.0	0.0	0.0	0.0	0.0	0.3	1.2	5.3
Source 1: NOAA
Source 2: National Weather Service

== Demographics ==
Historical population
Census	Pop.	Note	%±
1880	665		—
1890	970		45.9%
1900	1,067		10.0%
1910	1,211		13.5%
1920	1,885		55.7%
1930	1,776		−5.8%
1940	1,948		9.7%
1950	1,640		−15.8%
1960	1,677		2.3%
1970	1,555		−7.3%
1980	1,579		1.5%
1990	1,306		−17.3%
2000	1,342		2.8%
2010	1,124		−16.2%
2020	1,000		−11.0%
U.S. Decennial Census

=== 2010 census ===
As of the census of 2010, there were 1,124 people, 482 households, and 269 families residing in the city. The population density was 1,387.7 inhabitants per square mile (535.8/km^{2}). There were 615 housing units at an average density of 759.3 per square mile (293.2/km^{2}). The racial makeup of the city was 91.3% White, 0.4% African American, 2.8% Native American, 0.1% Asian, 0.2% Pacific Islander, 2.2% from other races, and 3.0% from two or more races. Hispanic or Latino of any race were 5.2% of the population.

There were 482 households, of which 25.5% had children under the age of 18 living with them, 40.9% were married couples living together, 11.0% had a female householder with no husband present, 3.9% had a male householder with no wife present, and 44.2% were non-families. 40.5% of all households were made up of individuals, and 19.1% had someone living alone who was 65 years of age or older. The average household size was 2.19 and the average family size was 2.86.

The median age in the city was 48.1 years. 21.6% of residents were under the age of 18; 6.7% were between the ages of 18 and 24; 18.2% were from 25 to 44; 26.5% were from 45 to 64; and 26.8% were 65 years of age or older. The gender makeup of the city was 47.3% male and 52.7% female.

=== 2000 census ===
As of the census of 2000, there were 1,342 people, 560 households, and 346 families residing in the city. The population density was 1,712.6 inhabitants per square mile (661.2/km^{2}). There were 652 housing units at an average density of 832.1 per square mile (321.3/km^{2}). The racial makeup of the city was 93.44% White, 0.52% African American, 3.35% Native American, 0.22% Asian, 0.15% Pacific Islander, 0.45% from other races, and 1.86% from two or more races. Hispanic or Latino of any race were 2.09% of the population.

There were 560 households, out of which 23.9% had children under the age of 18 living with them, 48.9% were married couples living together, 10.0% had a female householder with no husband present, and 38.2% were non-families. 35.2% of all households were made up of individuals, and 18.4% had someone living alone who was 65 years of age or older. The average household size was 2.25 and the average family size was 2.90.

In the city, the population was spread out, with 23.0% under the age of 18, 7.9% from 18 to 24, 21.3% from 25 to 44, 19.8% from 45 to 64, and 27.9% who were 65 years of age or older. The median age was 43 years. For every 100 females, there were 83.8 males. For every 100 females age 18 and over, there were 80.6 males.

The median income for a household in the city was $24,324, and the median income for a family was $32,574. Males had a median income of $21,490 versus $19,261 for females. The per capita income for the city was $14,153. About 6.8% of families and 11.1% of the population were below the poverty line, including 13.0% of those under age 18 and 9.5% of those age 65 or over.

== Education ==
Sedan is served by Chautauqua County USD 286 public school district, and its Sedan Jr/Sr High School is located in Sedan. Schools in Chautauqua County were consolidated through school unification.

Prior to school unification, the Sedan Blue Devils won the Kansas State High School class B baseball championship in 1973 and 2011.

== Area attractions ==
- The Emmett Kelly Museum is located in Sedan, honoring native son, circus clown Emmett Kelly.
- Butcher Falls

== Notable people ==
- Emmett Kelly, circus performer who created the clown character "Weary Willie", based on the hobos of the Great Depression in the 1930s
- Elmer S. Riggs, paleontologist who died in Sedan
- Cassius M. Shartel, U.S. representative from Missouri
- William H. Sproul, U.S. representative from Kansas
- Charlie Weatherbie, college football coach

== Twin city ==
Sedan, Kansas has a partnership with the village of Sedan, France. Sedan is located in the Ardennes in Northern France.

== See also ==
- Tallgrass Beef Company
