= Hamilton, Kansas =

City in Greenwood County, Kansas

- City
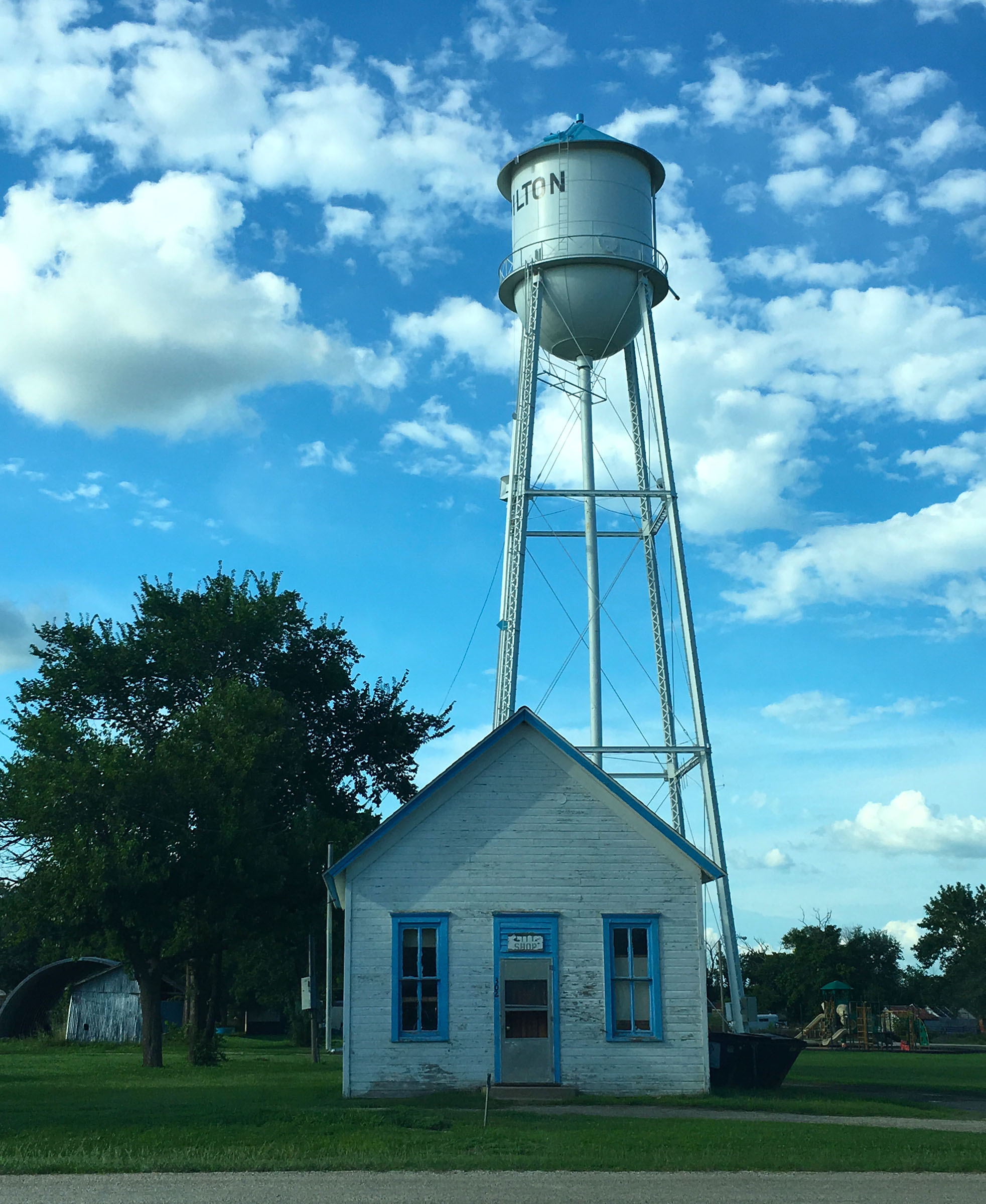
- Water tower (2016)

- Location within Greenwood County and Kansas

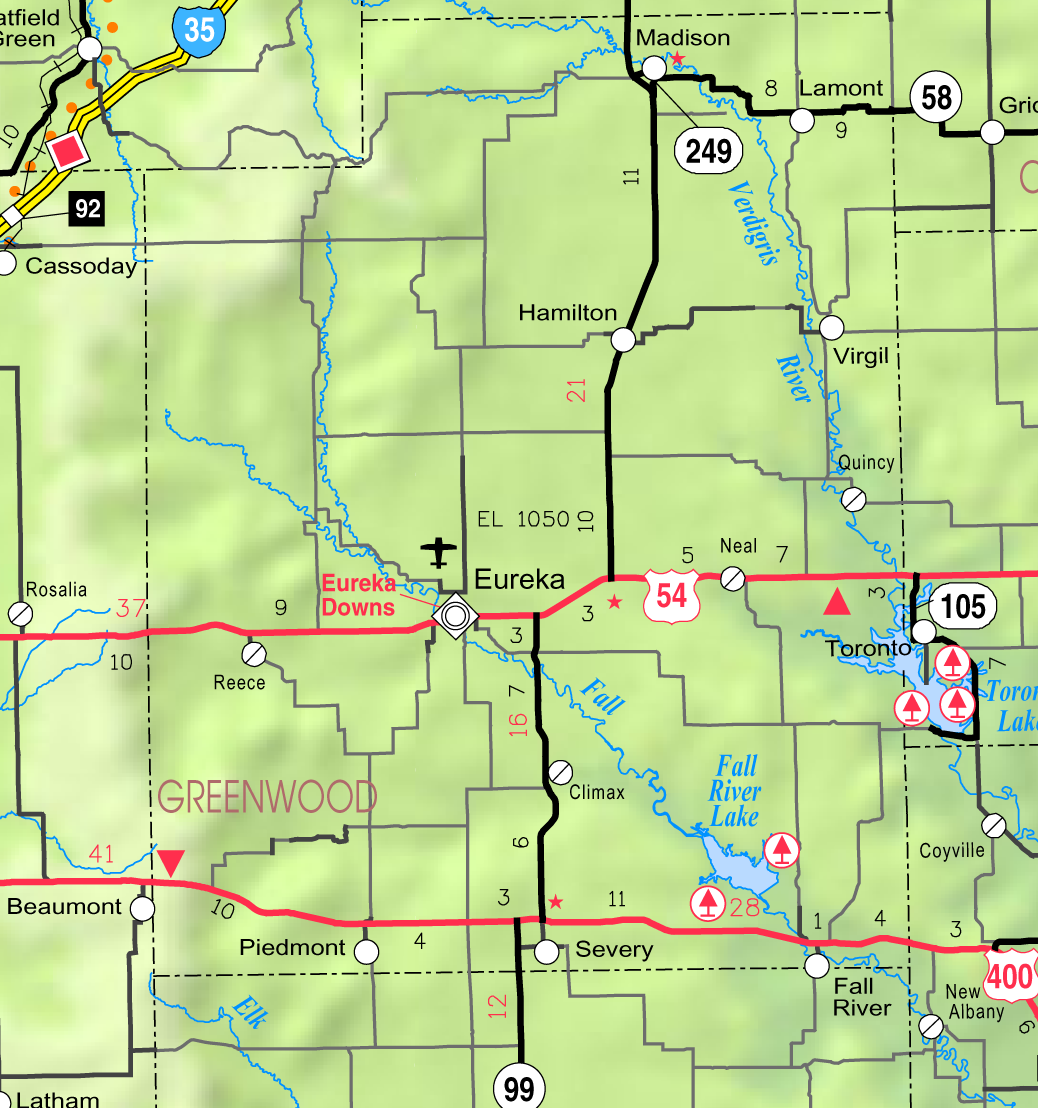
- KDOT map of Greenwood County (legend)
- Coordinates: 37°58′50″N 96°09′50″W
- Country: United States
- State: Kansas
- County: Greenwood
- Founded: 1879
- Incorporated: 1903
- Named for: Alexander Hamilton

Government
  - Type: Mayor–Council

Area
  - Total: 0.31 sq mi (0.81 km^{2})
  - Land: 0.31 sq mi (0.81 km^{2})
  - Water: 0 sq mi (0.00 km^{2})
- Elevation: 1,096 ft (334 m)

Population (2020)
  - Total: 182
  - Density: 580/sq mi (220/km^{2})
- Time zone: UTC-6 (CST)
  - Summer (DST): UTC-5 (CDT)
- ZIP Code: 66853
- Area code: 620
- FIPS code: 20-29675
- GNIS ID: 2394278

Hamilton is a city in Greenwood County, Kansas, United States. As of the 2020 census, the population of the city was 182.

== History ==
Hamilton was founded about 1879. The city was named in honor of Alexander Hamilton, first Secretary of the Treasury.

Hamilton was a station and shipping point on the Atchison, Topeka and Santa Fe Railway.

== Geography ==
According to the United States Census Bureau, the city has a total area of 0.31 square miles (0.80 km^{2}), all land.

=== Climate ===
The climate in this area is characterized by hot, humid summers and generally mild to cool winters. According to the Köppen Climate Classification system, Hamilton has a humid subtropical climate, abbreviated "Cfa" on climate maps.

== Demographics ==
Historical population
Census	Pop.	Note	%±
1890	206		—
1910	325		—
1920	398		22.5%
1930	549		37.9%
1940	519		−5.5%
1950	456		−12.1%
1960	400		−12.3%
1970	349		−12.7%
1980	363		4.0%
1990	301		−17.1%
2000	334		11.0%
2010	268		−19.8%
2020	182		−32.1%
U.S. Decennial Census

=== 2020 census ===
The 2020 United States census counted 182 people, 89 households, and 50 families in Hamilton. The population density was 583.3 per square mile (225.2/km^{2}). There were 124 housing units at an average density of 397.4 per square mile (153.5/km^{2}). The racial makeup was 91.21% (166) white or European American (91.21% non-Hispanic white), 0.0% (0) black or African-American, 0.55% (1) Native American or Alaska Native, 0.0% (0) Asian, 0.0% (0) Pacific Islander or Native Hawaiian, 1.1% (2) from other races, and 7.14% (13) from two or more races. Hispanic or Latino of any race was 2.2% (4) of the population.

Of the 89 households, 22.5% had children under the age of 18; 41.6% were married couples living together; 22.5% had a female householder with no spouse or partner present. 39.3% of households consisted of individuals and 18.0% had someone living alone who was 65 years of age or older. The average household size was 2.2 and the average family size was 2.7. The percent of those with a bachelor's degree or higher was estimated to be 7.1% of the population.

22.0% of the population was under the age of 18, 7.1% from 18 to 24, 22.5% from 25 to 44, 28.0% from 45 to 64, and 20.3% who were 65 years of age or older. The median age was 44.3 years. For every 100 females, there were 87.6 males. For every 100 females ages 18 and older, there were 91.9 males.

The 2016–2020 5-year American Community Survey estimates show that the median household income was $36,000 (with a margin of error of +/- $10,769) and the median family income was $40,278 (+/- $7,631). Males had a median income of $30,357 (+/- $9,049) versus $22,143 (+/- $8,155) for females. The median income for those above 16 years old was $24,444 (+/- $9,169). Approximately, 14.1% of families and 18.5% of the population were below the poverty line, including 31.0% of those under the age of 18 and 6.3% of those ages 65 or over.

=== 2010 census ===
As of the census of 2010, there were 268 people, 117 households, and 72 families residing in the city. The population density was 864.5 inhabitants per square mile (333.8/km^{2}). There were 161 housing units at an average density of 519.4 per square mile (200.5/km^{2}). The racial makeup of the city was 94.4% White, 2.6% Native American, 0.4% Asian, and 2.6% from two or more races. Hispanic or Latino of any race were 0.4% of the population.

There were 117 households, of which 29.9% had children under the age of 18 living with them, 38.5% were married couples living together, 12.0% had a female householder with no husband present, 11.1% had a male householder with no wife present, and 38.5% were non-families. 34.2% of all households were made up of individuals, and 13.7% had someone living alone who was 65 years of age or older. The average household size was 2.29 and the average family size was 2.90.

The median age in the city was 40.3 years. 24.3% of residents were under the age of 18; 11.1% were between the ages of 18 and 24; 19.4% were from 25 to 44; 29.5% were from 45 to 64; and 15.7% were 65 years of age or older. The gender makeup of the city was 50.0% male and 50.0% female.

=== 2000 census ===
As of the census of 2000, there were 334 people, 140 households, and 98 families residing in the city. The population density was 1,069.8 inhabitants per square mile (413.1/km^{2}). There were 164 housing units at an average density of 525.3 per square mile (202.8/km^{2}). The racial makeup of the city was 97.90% White, 1.20% African American and 0.90% Native American. Hispanic or Latino of any race were 0.30% of the population.

There were 140 households, out of which 32.1% had children under the age of 18 living with them, 55.0% were married couples living together, 10.7% had a female householder with no husband present, and 30.0% were non-families. 26.4% of all households were made up of individuals, and 12.9% had someone living alone who was 65 years of age or older. The average household size was 2.39 and the average family size was 2.86.

In the city, the population was spread out, with 25.7% under the age of 18, 11.1% from 18 to 24, 24.6% from 25 to 44, 21.3% from 45 to 64, and 17.4% who were 65 years of age or older. The median age was 36 years. For every 100 females, there were 96.5 males. For every 100 females age 18 and over, there were 96.8 males.

The median income for a household in the city was $30,781, and the median income for a family was $36,250. Males had a median income of $25,375 versus $21,696 for females. The per capita income for the city was $13,129. About 15.6% of families and 15.9% of the population were below the poverty line, including 16.9% of those under age 18 and 9.3% of those age 65 or over.

== Education ==
This community and nearby rural areas are served by Hamilton USD 390 public school district.

== Notable person ==
- Will Carpenter, member of the Kansas House of Representatives
