= Richard Howe House =

Historic house in Kansas, United States

- U.S. National Register of Historic Places
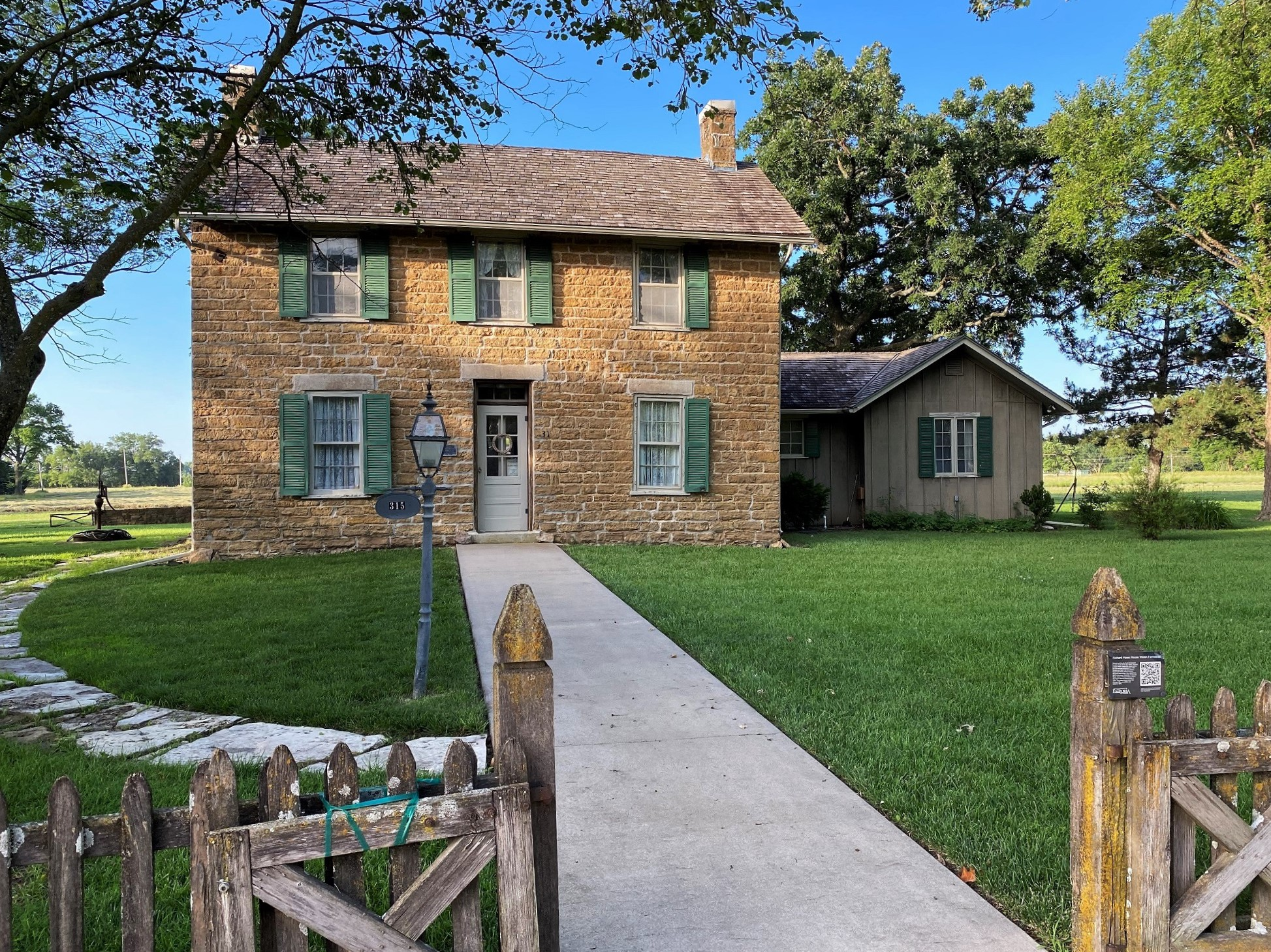

- Location within Kansas Location within the United States
- Location: 315 E. Logan Ave. Emporia, Kansas
- Coordinates: 38°23′29″N 96°10′28″W
- Area: less than one acre
- Built: c.1866-67
- Built by: Richard Howe
- NRHP reference No.: 86001701
- Added to NRHP: July 17, 1986

The Richard Howe House, located at 315 E. Logan Ave. in Emporia, Kansas, was built in about 1866–67. It was listed on the National Register of Historic Places in 1986.

It was deemed notable for "its historical association with the development of Emporia, Kansas (est. 1857) and for its architectural significance as a rare, extant example of a first settlement period limestone structure."

It was built by stonemason Richard Howe (1825-1910). It is a two-story, three-bay, gable roofed limestone building with vernacular style, with elements of Federal and Greek Revival architecture.
