= Madison, Kansas =

City in Greenwood County, Kansas

- City
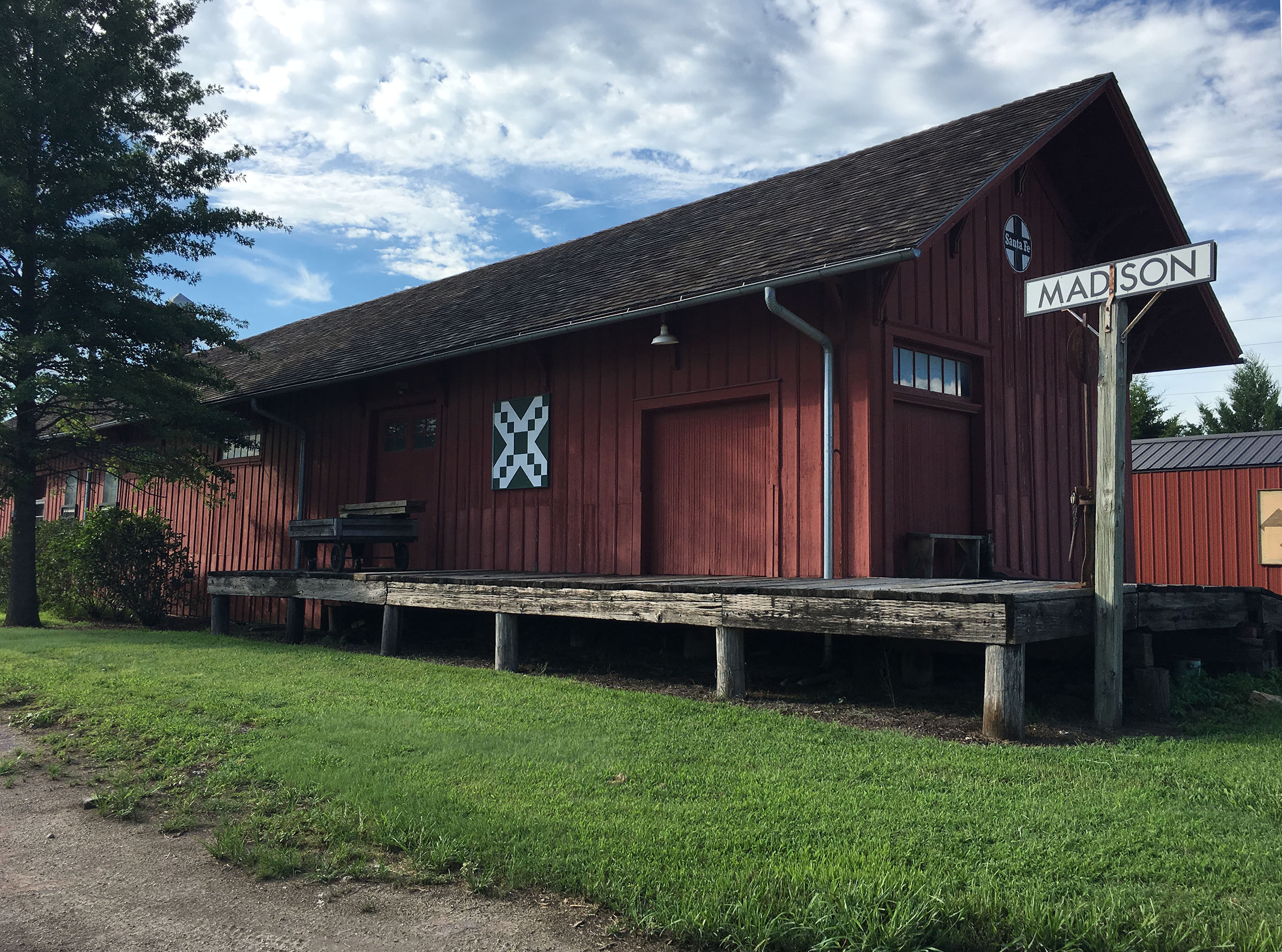
- Historic ATSF depot (2016)

- Location within Greenwood County and Kansas

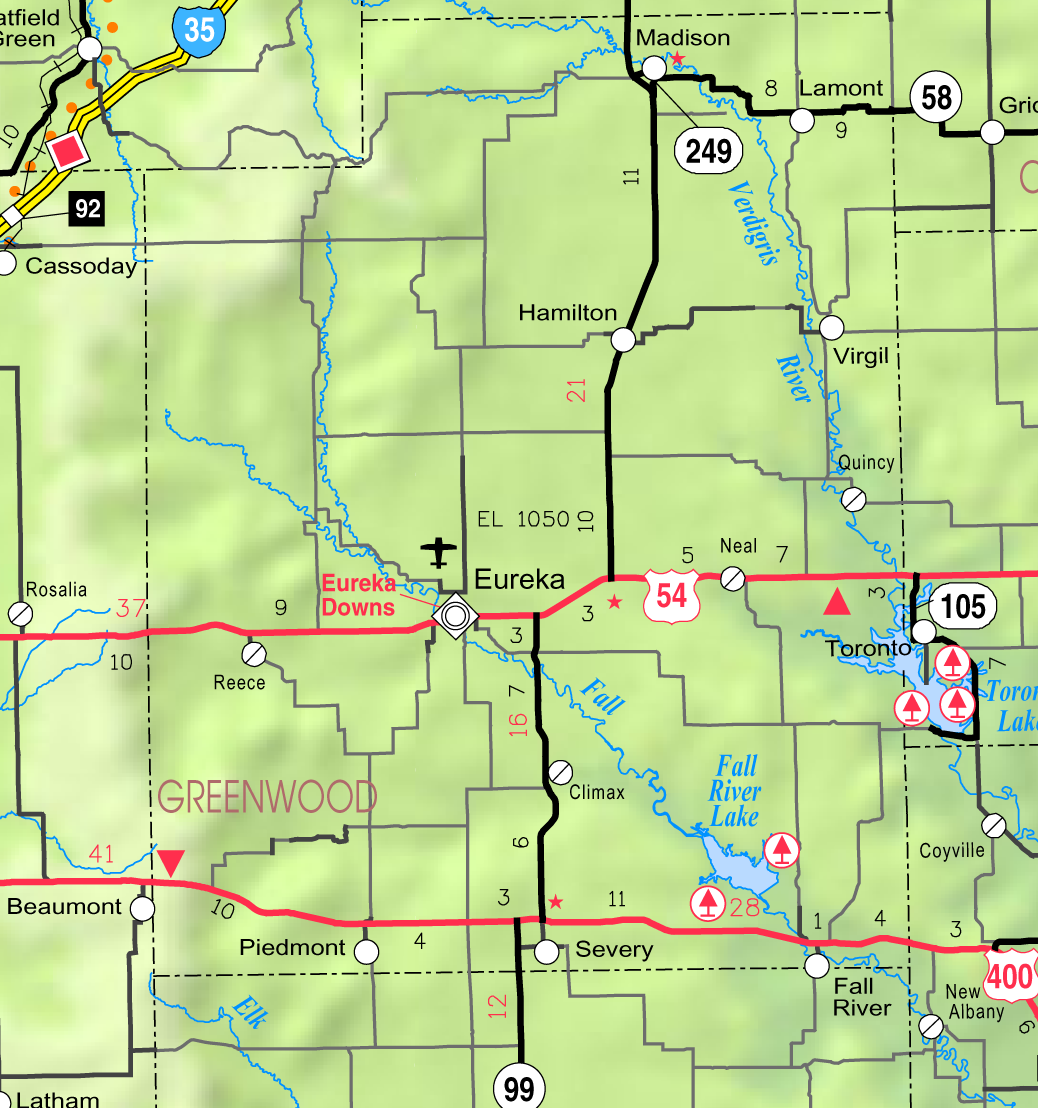
- KDOT map of Greenwood County (legend)
- Coordinates: 38°07′59″N 96°8′14″W
- Country: United States
- State: Kansas
- County: Greenwood
- Founded: 1872
- Incorporated: 1885
- Named for: Madison Township

Government
  - Type: Mayor–Council

Area
  - Total: 0.59 sq mi (1.52 km^{2})
  - Land: 0.59 sq mi (1.52 km^{2})
  - Water: 0 sq mi (0.00 km^{2})
- Elevation: 1,145 ft (349 m)

Population (2020)
  - Total: 689
  - Density: 1,170/sq mi (453/km^{2})
- Time zone: UTC-6 (CST)
  - Summer (DST): UTC-5 (CDT)
- ZIP Codes: 66855, 66860
- Area code: 620
- FIPS code: 20-44050
- GNIS ID: 2395809
- Website: madisonkansas.org

Madison is a city in Greenwood County, Kansas, United States, along the Verdigris River. As of the 2020 census, the population of the city was 689.

== History ==
Madison was founded in 1872, northwest of the present town. In 1879, the town was relocated to its present site when the Howard Branch of the Atchison, Topeka & Santa Fe Railroad was built from Emporia to Moline. The first building was the home of W. H. Green, a Civil War veteran. Green went to Kansas in 1867, took up a homestead, and operated a trading post on the original town site. Madison took its name from Madison Township.

== Geography ==
According to the United States Census Bureau, the city has a total area of 0.61 square miles (1.58 km^{2}), all of it land.

=== Climate ===
The climate in this area is characterized by hot, humid summers and generally mild to cool winters. According to the Köppen Climate Classification system, Madison has a humid subtropical climate, abbreviated "Cfa" on climate maps.

== Demographics ==
Historical population
Census	Pop.	Note	%±
1880	123		—
1890	623		406.5%
1900	683		9.6%
1910	721		5.6%
1920	795		10.3%
1930	1,488		87.2%
1940	1,198		−19.5%
1950	1,212		1.2%
1960	1,105		−8.8%
1970	1,061		−4.0%
1980	1,099		3.6%
1990	845		−23.1%
2000	857		1.4%
2010	701		−18.2%
2020	689		−1.7%
U.S. Decennial Census

=== 2020 census ===
The 2020 United States census counted 689 people, 299 households, and 179 families in Madison. The population density was 1,179.8 per square mile (455.5/km^{2}). There were 390 housing units at an average density of 667.8 per square mile (257.8/km^{2}). The racial makeup was 90.71% (625) white or European American (87.81% non-Hispanic white), 1.02% (7) black or African-American, 1.31% (9) Native American or Alaska Native, 0.44% (3) Asian, 0.0% (0) Pacific Islander or Native Hawaiian, 0.44% (3) from other races, and 6.1% (42) from two or more races. Hispanic or Latino of any race was 4.35% (30) of the population.

Of the 299 households, 25.8% had children under the age of 18; 46.2% were married couples living together; 28.8% had a female householder with no spouse or partner present. 34.8% of households consisted of individuals and 16.1% had someone living alone who was 65 years of age or older. The average household size was 2.2 and the average family size was 2.9. The percent of those with a bachelor's degree or higher was estimated to be 17.4% of the population.

24.1% of the population was under the age of 18, 7.5% from 18 to 24, 21.6% from 25 to 44, 25.1% from 45 to 64, and 21.6% who were 65 years of age or older. The median age was 42.1 years. For every 100 females, there were 102.6 males. For every 100 females ages 18 and older, there were 107.5 males.

The 2016–2020 5-year American Community Survey estimates show that the median household income was $38,393 (with a margin of error of +/- $4,174) and the median family income was $58,333 (+/- $23,542). Males had a median income of $33,393 (+/- $5,803) versus $16,875 (+/- $3,611) for females. The median income for those above 16 years old was $27,438 (+/- $5,393). Approximately, 12.6% of families and 17.1% of the population were below the poverty line, including 21.5% of those under the age of 18 and 14.6% of those ages 65 or over.

=== 2010 census ===
As of the census of 2010, there were 701 people, 313 households, and 190 families living in the city. The population density was 1,149.2 inhabitants per square mile (443.7/km^{2}). There were 401 housing units at an average density of 657.4 per square mile (253.8/km^{2}). The racial makeup of the city was 95.1% White, 0.1% African American, 1.7% Native American, 0.1% Asian, 0.6% from other races, and 2.3% from two or more races. Hispanic or Latino of any race were 2.9% of the population.

There were 313 households, of which 26.5% had children under the age of 18 living with them, 49.8% were married couples living together, 7.3% had a female householder with no husband present, 3.5% had a male householder with no wife present, and 39.3% were non-families. 35.5% of all households were made up of individuals, and 14.3% had someone living alone who was 65 years of age or older. The average household size was 2.24 and the average family size was 3.90

The median age in the city was 42.3 years. 25.1% of residents were under the age of 18; 5.2% were between the ages of 18 and 24; 23.4% were from 25 to 44; 27.8% were from 45 to 64; and 18.3% were 65 years of age or older. The gender makeup of the city was 47.6% male and 52.4% female.

=== 2000 census ===
As of the census of 2000, there were 857 people, 361 households, and 225 families living in the city. The population density was 1,425.4 inhabitants per square mile (550.4/km^{2}). There were 418 housing units at an average density of 695.2 per square mile (268.4/km^{2}). The racial makeup of the city was 96.27% White, 0.12% African American, 0.93% Native American, 0.12% Asian, 0.47% from other races, and 2.10% from two or more races. Hispanic or Latino of any race were 1.40% of the population.

There were 361 households, out of which 28.8% had children under the age of 18 living with them, 52.9% were married couples living together, 7.2% had a female householder with no husband present, and 37.4% were non-families. 34.3% of all households were made up of individuals, and 21.6% had someone living alone who was 65 years of age or older. The average household size was 2.27 and the average family size was 2.93.

In the city, the population was spread out, with 23.9% under the age of 18, 6.7% from 18 to 24, 23.5% from 25 to 44, 22.9% from 45 to 64, and 23.1% who were 65 years of age or older. The median age was 41 years. For every 100 females, there were 90.0 males. For every 100 females age 18 and over, there were 80.6 males.

The median income for a household in the city was $30,536, and the median income for a family was $40,125. Males had a median income of $25,625 versus $18,333 for females. The per capita income for the city was $15,558. About 9.1% of families and 13.1% of the population were below the poverty line, including 17.8% of those under age 18 and 9.6% of those age 65 or over.

== Education ==
The community is served by Madison–Virgil USD 386 public school district.

The Madison Bulldogs won the Kansas State High School boys class 1A basketball championship in 1976 and the 1A football championship in 1984.

== See also ==
- National Register of Historic Places listings in Greenwood County, Kansas
