= Fall River Lake =

- Location within Kansas Location within the United States

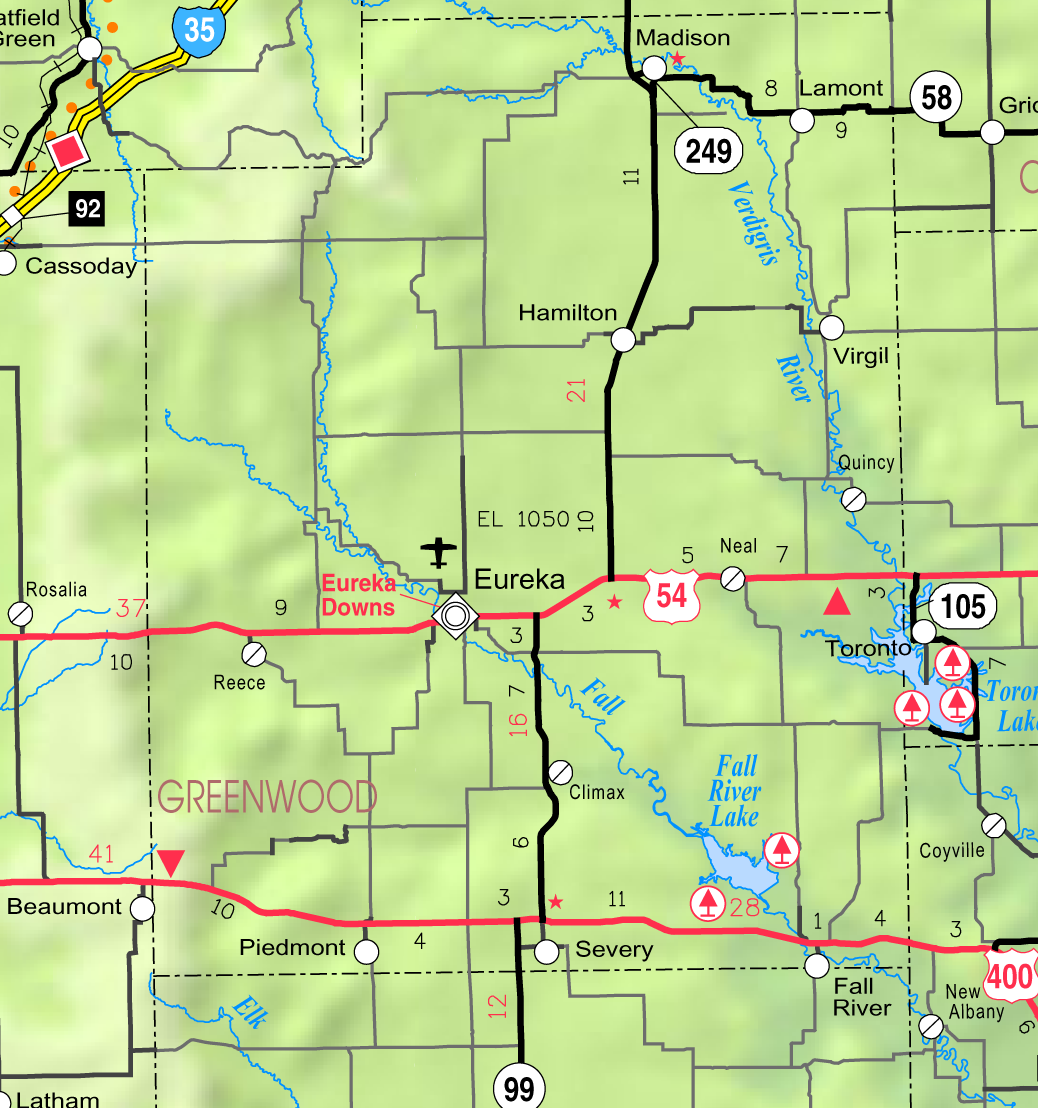
- KDOT map of Greenwood County (legend)
- Location: Greenwood County, Kansas
- Coordinates: 37°39′53″N 96°05′12″W
- Type: Reservoir
- Primary inflows: Fall River
- Primary outflows: Fall River to Verdigris River
- Basin countries: United States
- Managing agency: U.S. Army Corps of Engineers
- Built: 1948
- First flooded: 1949
- Surface elevation: 945 ft (288 m)
- Settlements: Fall River, Climax, Severy, Coyville

Fall River Lake is a reservoir in Greenwood County, Kansas, United States.

== History ==
Construction of the dam was started on May 9, 1946. The embankment closure was completed on August 12, 1948, and the conservation pool was filled on June 9, 1949. The project was completed for full flood control operation in April 1949.

== See also ==
- Fall River State Park
- Toronto Lake, northeast of Fall River Lake
- List of Kansas state parks
- List of lakes, reservoirs, and dams in Kansas
- List of rivers of Kansas
