= George Munday =

American football player (1907–1975)

- Munday, 1933

Profile
- Positions: Guard, tackle

Personal information
- Born: June 13, 1907; Climax, Kansas, U.S.
- Died: October 17, 1975 (aged 68); Miami, Florida, U.S.
- Listed height: 6 ft 2 in (1.88 m)
- Listed weight: 215 lb (98 kg)

Career information
- College: College of Emporia (1925–1928)

Career history
- Cleveland Indians (1931); New York Giants (1931–1932); Cincinnati Reds (1933–1934); St. Louis Gunners (1934); Brooklyn/Rochester Tigers (1936)
- Stats at Pro Football Reference

George Munday (June 13, 1907 – October 17, 1975), known while playing professional football as "Sunday" Munday, was an American football player. He played college football for the College of Emporia (1925–1928) and professional football for the Cleveland Indians (1931), New York Giants (1931–1932), Cincinnati Reds (1933–1934), St. Louis Gunners (1934), and Brooklyn/Rochester Tigers (1936).

== Early life ==
Munday was born in Severy, Kansas, in 1907. He attended Eureka High School in Eureka, Kansas. He then enrolled at the College of Emporia in Emporia, Kansas, and played college football at the tackle position for the College of Emporia Fighting Presbies football teams from 1925 to 1928. He helped lead the 1928 Emporia team to an undefeated season in 1928 and was described as "the keystone of the forward wall." He also ran track for Emporia, competing in the 220- and 440-yard dashes. After graduating from Emporia, he coached football at Saffordville, Kansas.

== Professional football ==
Munday played professional football in 1931, appearing in one game as a guard for the Cleveland Indians. He then signed with the New York Giants, playing at the tackle position and appearing in two games in 1931 season and three games in 1932.

In July 1933, Munday was sold by the Giants to the newly-formed Cincinnati Reds. He appeared in 17 games for Cincinnati, all as a starter, during the 1933 and 1934 NFL seasons. He also appeared in two games for the St. Louis Gunners in 1934. After being away from professional football in 1935, Munday returned to the game in 1936, playing for the Brooklyn/Rochester Tigers of the American Football League.

== Later life ==
Munday later operated the Munday Ventilator Block Co. He died in 1975 in Miami, Florida.
