= Coyville, Kansas =

City in Wilson County, Kansas

- City
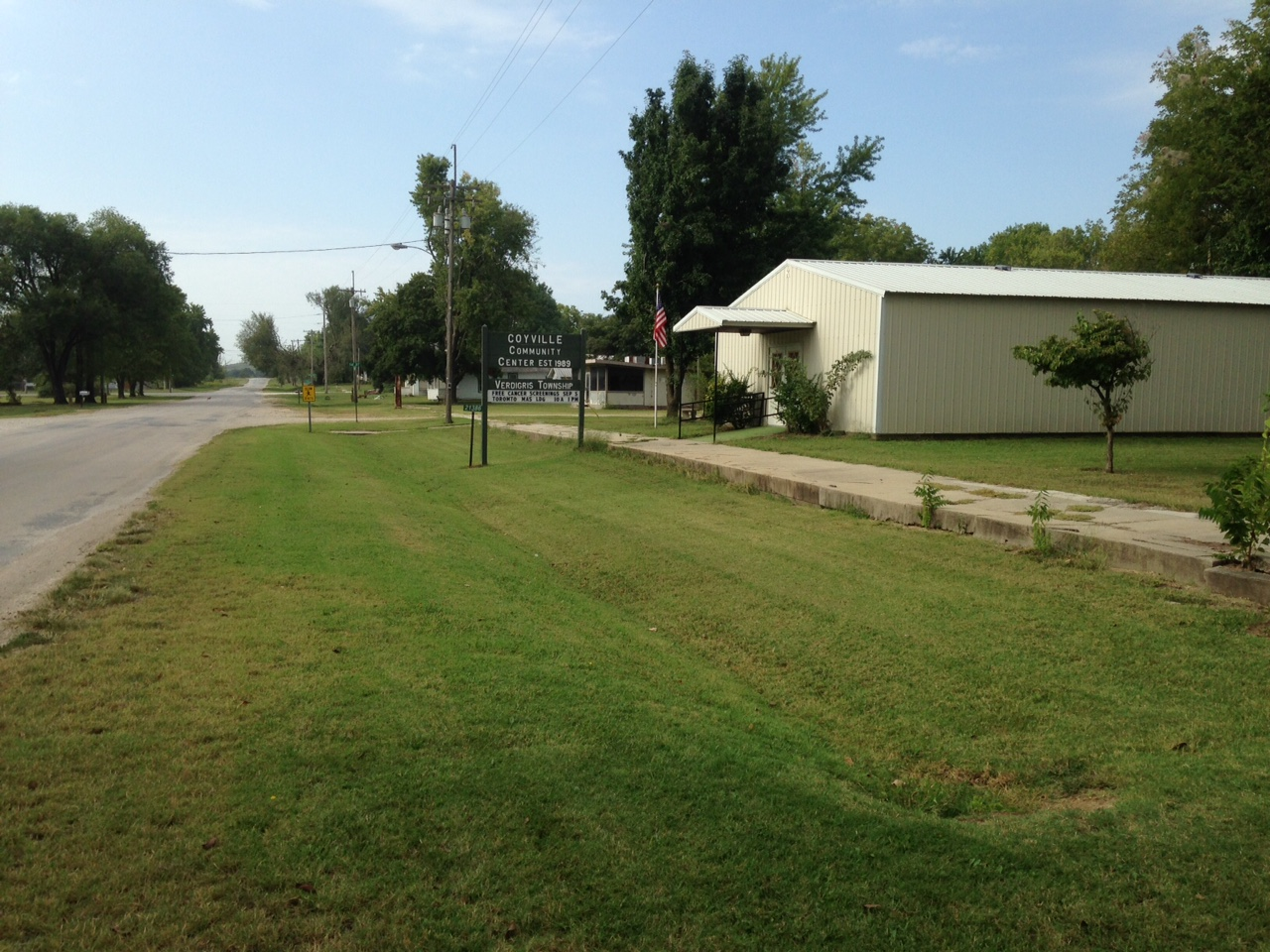
- Community center in Coyville (2015)

- Location within Wilson County and Kansas

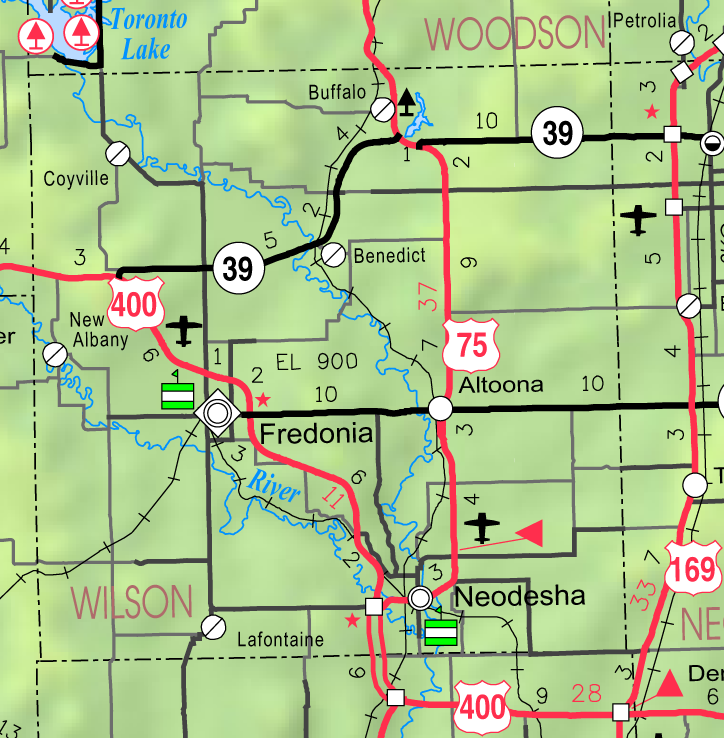
- KDOT map of Wilson County (legend)
- Coordinates: 37°41′14″N 95°53′45″W
- Country: United States
- State: Kansas
- County: Wilson
- Platted: 1886
- Incorporated: 1906
- Named for: Oscar Coy

Area
  - Total: 0.27 sq mi (0.70 km^{2})
  - Land: 0.27 sq mi (0.70 km^{2})
  - Water: 0 sq mi (0.00 km^{2})
- Elevation: 879 ft (268 m)

Population (2020)
  - Total: 60
  - Density: 220/sq mi (86/km^{2})
- Time zone: UTC-6 (CST)
  - Summer (DST): UTC-5 (CDT)
- ZIP Codes: 66727, 66736
- Area code: 620
- FIPS code: 20-16150
- GNIS ID: 2393658

Coyville is a city in Wilson County, Kansas, United States. As of the 2020 census, the population of the city was 60.

== History ==
Coyville was laid out in 1886 when the Atchison, Topeka and Santa Fe Railway was extended to that point. The town was named for Oscar Coy, a store owner who in 1866 served as the first postmaster.

Currently, the only business is a small vehicle-body repair shop; services consist of a community hall and a church. The remainder of the community consist of several roads, mostly white gravel, with an assortment of homes, plus a cemetery.

== Geography ==
According to the United States Census Bureau, the city has a total area of 0.28 square miles (0.73 km^{2}), all land.

=== Climate ===
The climate in this area is characterized by hot, humid summers and generally mild to cool winters. According to the Köppen Climate Classification system, Coyville has a humid subtropical climate, abbreviated "Cfa" on climate maps.

== Demographics ==
Historical population
| Census | Pop. | Note | %± |
|---|---|---|---|
| 1910 | 227 | | — |
| 1920 | 232 | | 2.2% |
| 1930 | 196 | | −15.5% |
| 1940 | 175 | | −10.7% |
| 1950 | 106 | | −39.4% |
| 1960 | 133 | | 25.5% |
| 1970 | 93 | | −30.1% |
| 1980 | 98 | | 5.4% |
| 1990 | 78 | | −20.4% |
| 2000 | 71 | | −9.0% |
| 2010 | 46 | | −35.2% |
| 2020 | 60 | | 30.4% |
U.S. Decennial Census

=== 2020 census ===
The 2020 United States census counted 60 people, 24 households, and 17 families in Coyville. The population density was 223.0 per square mile (86.1/km^{2}). There were 34 housing units at an average density of 126.4 per square mile (48.8/km^{2}). The racial makeup was 90.0% (54) white or European American (90.0% non-Hispanic white), 0.0% (0) black or African-American, 0.0% (0) Native American or Alaska Native, 0.0% (0) Asian, 0.0% (0) Pacific Islander or Native Hawaiian, 0.0% (0) from other races, and 10.0% (6) from two or more races. Hispanic or Latino of any race was 0.0% (0) of the population.

Of the 24 households, 29.2% had children under the age of 18; 54.2% were married couples living together; 12.5% had a female householder with no spouse or partner present. 29.2% of households consisted of individuals and 16.7% had someone living alone who was 65 years of age or older. The average household size was 2.0 and the average family size was 3.1. The percent of those with a bachelor's degree or higher was estimated to be 0.0% of the population.

13.3% of the population was under the age of 18, 3.3% from 18 to 24, 18.3% from 25 to 44, 28.3% from 45 to 64, and 36.7% who were 65 years of age or older. The median age was 59.0 years. For every 100 females, there were 93.5 males. For every 100 females ages 18 and older, there were 92.6 males.

The 2016–2020 5-year American Community Survey estimates show that the median income for those above 16 years old was $31,875 (+/- $6,803). Approximately, 10.0% of families and 11.6% of the population were below the poverty line, including 0.0% of those under the age of 18 and 18.8% of those ages 65 or over.

=== 2010 census ===
As of the census of 2010, there were 46 people, 26 households, and 8 families residing in the city. The population density was 164.3 inhabitants per square mile (63.4/km^{2}). There were 34 housing units at an average density of 121.4 per square mile (46.9/km^{2}). The racial makeup of the city was 80.4% White, 2.2% Native American, 8.7% from other races, and 8.7% from two or more races. Hispanic or Latino of any race were 2.2% of the population.

There were 26 households, of which 19.2% had children under the age of 18 living with them, 26.9% were married couples living together, 3.8% had a male householder with no wife present, and 69.2% were non-families. 65.4% of all households were made up of individuals, and 23.1% had someone living alone who was 65 years of age or older. The average household size was 1.77 and the average family size was 3.38.

The median age in the city was 49.6 years. 23.9% of residents were under the age of 18; 8.6% were between the ages of 18 and 24; 6.6% were from 25 to 44; 43.5% were from 45 to 64; and 17.4% were 65 years of age or older. The gender makeup of the city was 45.7% male and 54.3% female.

=== 2000 census ===
As of the census of 2000, there were 71 people, 28 households, and 18 families residing in the city. The population density was 257.9 inhabitants per square mile (99.6/km^{2}). There were 39 housing units at an average density of 141.7 per square mile (54.7/km^{2}). The racial makeup of the city was 98.59% White, and 1.41% from two or more races.

There were 28 households, out of which 35.7% had children under the age of 18 living with them, 57.1% were married couples living together, 7.1% had a female householder with no husband present, and 35.7% were non-families. 32.1% of all households were made up of individuals, and 7.1% had someone living alone who was 65 years of age or older. The average household size was 2.54 and the average family size was 3.17.

In the city, the population was spread out, with 35.2% under the age of 18, 2.8% from 18 to 24, 25.4% from 25 to 44, 16.9% from 45 to 64, and 19.7% who were 65 years of age or older. The median age was 39 years. For every 100 females, there were 77.5 males. For every 100 females age 18 and over, there were 91.7 males.

The median income for a household in the city was $19,792, and the median income for a family was $59,375. Males had a median income of $47,750 versus $18,750 for females. The per capita income for the city was $15,012. There were no families and 6.7% of the population living below the poverty line, including no under eighteens and 28.6% of those over 64.

== See also ==
- Toronto Lake and Cross Timbers State Park
- Fall River Lake and Fall River State Park
