= Toronto Lake (Kansas) =

- Location within Kansas Location within the United States

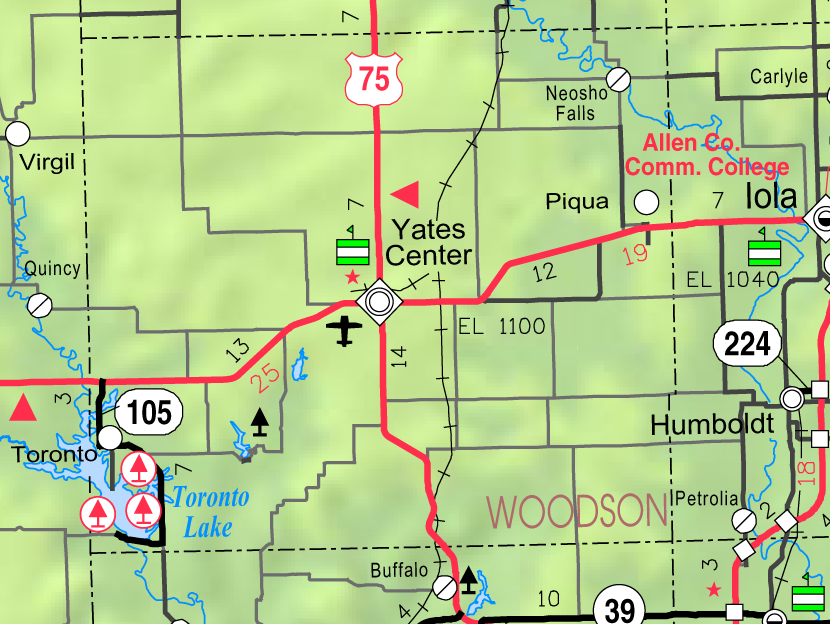
- KDOT map of Woodson County (legend)
- Location: Woodson / Greenwood counties in Kansas
- Coordinates: 37°45′49″N 95°56′10″W
- Type: Reservoir
- Primary outflows: Verdigris River
- Basin countries: United States
- Managing agency: U.S. Army Corps of Engineers
- Built: 1960
- Surface elevation: 896 ft (273 m)
- Settlements: Toronto, Coyville

Toronto Lake is a flood control lake in southeast Kansas, primarily in Woodson County. It is located on the Verdigris River about 4 miles (6.4 km) southeast of Toronto, Kansas. The lake is maintained by the U.S. Army Corps of Engineers.

== History ==
Toronto Lake was authorized in the Flood Control Act of 1941. Construction started on the lake in November 1954 and it was completed in February 1960. In addition to flood control, the lake serves for recreational purposes, to improve water quality, and potentially to supply water.

== See also ==
- Cross Timbers State Park
- Fall River Lake, southwest of Toronto Lake
- List of Kansas state parks
- List of lakes, reservoirs, and dams in Kansas
- List of rivers of Kansas
