= Pleasant Grove Township =

Pleasant Grove Township may refer to the following townships in the United States:

- Pleasant Grove Township, Coles County, Illinois
- Pleasant Grove Township, Des Moines County, Iowa
- Pleasant Grove Township, Floyd County, Iowa
- Pleasant Grove Township, Greenwood County, Kansas
- Pleasant Grove Township, Olmsted County, Minnesota
