= Lane Township =

Lane Township may refer to the following townships in the United States:

- Lane Township, Warrick County, Indiana
- Lane Township, Greenwood County, Kansas
- Lane Township, Smith County, Kansas

== See also ==
- Cherry Lane Township, Alleghany County, North Carolina
