= Fall River Township =

Fall River Township may refer to the following townships in the United States:

- Fall River Township, LaSalle County, Illinois
- Fall River Township, Greenwood County, Kansas
