= Janesville Township =

Janesville Township may refer to the following townships in the United States:

- Janesville Township, Waseca County, Minnesota
- Janesville Township, Greenwood County, Kansas
