= Piedmont, Kansas =

Unincorporated community in Greenwood County, Kansas

- Unincorporated community and CDP
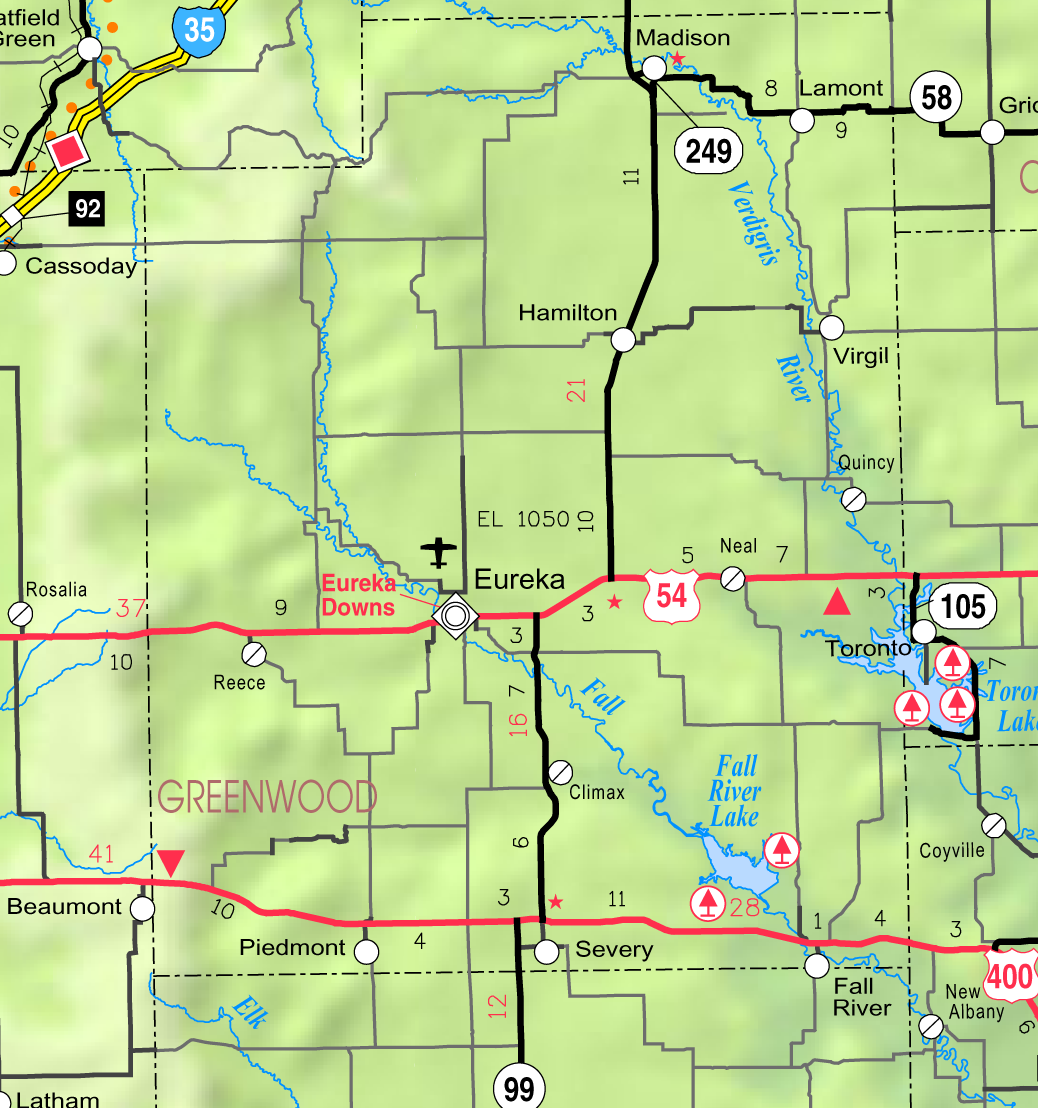
- KDOT map of Greenwood County (legend)

- Location within Kansas Location within the United States
- Coordinates: 37°37′25″N 96°21′56″W
- Country: United States
- State: Kansas
- County: Greenwood
- Elevation: 1,198 ft (365 m)

Population (2020)
  - Total: 52
- Time zone: UTC-6 (CST)
  - Summer (DST): UTC-5 (CDT)
- ZIP Code: 67122
- Area code: 620
- FIPS code: 20-55750
- GNIS ID: 2804490

Piedmont is an unincorporated community and census-designated place (CDP) in Greenwood County, Kansas, United States. As of the 2020 census, the population was 52. It is located approximately 7 miles (11 km) west of the city of Severy.

== History ==
Piedmont was founded about 1880. The first post office in Piedmont was established in May 1880. Piedmont has a post office with ZIP Code 67122.

== Demographics ==
Historical population
Census	Pop.	Note	%±
2020	52		—
U.S. Decennial Census

The 2020 United States census counted 52 people, 22 households, and 12 families in Piedmont. The population density was 14.0 per square mile (5.4/km^{2}). There were 30 housing units at an average density of 8.1 per square mile (3.1/km^{2}). The racial makeup was 80.77% (42) white or European American (80.77% non-Hispanic white), 0.0% (0) black or African-American, 0.0% (0) Native American or Alaska Native, 0.0% (0) Asian, 0.0% (0) Pacific Islander or Native Hawaiian, 3.85% (2) from other races, and 15.38% (8) from two or more races. Hispanic or Latino of any race was 15.38% (8) of the population.

Of the 22 households, 22.7% had children under the age of 18; 50.0% were married couples living together; 13.6% had a female householder with no spouse or partner present. 45.5% of households consisted of individuals and 22.7% had someone living alone who was 65 years of age or older. The average household size was 2.1 and the average family size was 3.0. The percent of those with a bachelor's degree or higher was estimated to be 0.0% of the population.

23.1% of the population was under the age of 18, 1.9% from 18 to 24, 17.3% from 25 to 44, 28.8% from 45 to 64, and 28.8% who were 65 years of age or older. The median age was 47.8 years. For every 100 females, there were 147.6 males. For every 100 females ages 18 and older, there were 150.0 males.

The 2016–2020 5-year American Community Survey estimates show that the median household income was $88,750 (with a margin of error of +/- $55,702).

== Education ==
The community is served by Eureka USD 389 public school district.
