= Ivanpah =

Ivanpah may refer to:

== Cities and communities ==
- Ivanpah, California, an unincorporated community in the Mojave National Preserve
- Ivanpah (ghost town), California, on the slope of Clark Mountain, approximately 20 miles from present-day Ivanpah, CA
- Ivanpah, Kansas, an unincorporated community in Greenwood County

== Mojave Desert places ==
- Ivanpah Valley, between the New York Mountains and Ivanpah Mountains
- Ivanpah Mountains, in the southeastern Mojave Desert
- Ivanpah Lake, a dry bed lake in the Ivanpah Valley
- Ivanpah Solar Power Facility, a 392-MW concentrated solar thermal plant
- Ivanpah Valley Airport, a planned relief airport for McCarran International Airport (LAS), approximately 5 miles SW of Jean Airport
