= Eureka Township =

Eureka Township may refer to:

- Eureka Township, Adair County, Iowa
- Eureka Township, Sac County, Iowa, in Sac County, Iowa
- Eureka Township, Barton County, Kansas
- Eureka Township, Greenwood County, Kansas
- Eureka Township, Kingman County, Kansas
- Eureka Township, Mitchell County, Kansas, in Mitchell County, Kansas
- Eureka Township, Rice County, Kansas, in Rice County, Kansas
- Eureka Township, Saline County, Kansas
- Eureka Township, Michigan
- Eureka Township, Dakota County, Minnesota
- Eureka Township, Valley County, Nebraska
- Eureka Township, Ward County, North Dakota, in Ward County, North Dakota
- Eureka Township, Aurora County, South Dakota, in Aurora County, South Dakota
- Eureka Township, Brookings County, South Dakota, in Brookings County, South Dakota
