= Twin Grove =

Twin Grove may refer to the following places in the United States:

- Twin Grove, Illinois in McLean County
- Twin Grove, Wisconsin in Jefferson, Green County
- Twin Grove Township, Greenwood County, Kansas

== See also ==
- Twin Groves, Arkansas in Faulkner County
