= List of Kansas state parks =

Map of Kansas State Parks

List of state parks in the U.S. state of Kansas operated by the Kansas Department of Wildlife and Parks:

== State parks ==
Name	County	Area	Estab- lished	Water body	Image	Notes					
Name	County	Area	Estab- lished	Water body	Image	Notes	Cedar Bluff State Park	Trego	850 acres (344.0 ha)	1962	Cedar Bluff Reservoir
Cheney State Park	Kingman, Reno	1,913 acres (774.2 ha)	1964	Cheney Reservoir							
Clinton State Park	Douglas	1,500 acres (607.0 ha)	1975	Clinton Lake							
Crawford State Park	Crawford	500 acres (202.3 ha)	1930s	State park lake							
Cross Timbers State Park	Woodson	1,075 acres (435.0 ha)		Verdigris River							
Eisenhower State Park	Osage	1,785 acres (722.4 ha)		Melvern Lake							
El Dorado State Park	Butler	4,500 acres (1,821.1 ha)		El Dorado Lake							
Elk City State Park	Montgomery	857 acres (347 ha)		Elk City Lake							
Fall River State Park	Greenwood	980 acres (396.6 ha)		Fall River							
Flint Hills Trail State Park											
Glen Elder State Park	Mitchell, Osborne		1964	Glen Elder Reservoir (Waconda Lake)							
Hillsdale State Park	Miami		1994	Hillsdale Lake							
Historic Lake Scott State Park	Scott	1,280 acres (518 ha)	1928	Scott State Fishing Lake							
Kanopolis State Park	Ellsworth	25,000+ acres	1948	Kanopolis Lake							
Kaw River State Park	Shawnee	76 acres (30.8 ha)	2010	Kansas River							
Little Jerusalem Badlands State Park	Logan	330 acres (130 ha)	2018								
Lovewell State Park	Jewell	1,160 acres (469.4 ha)	1967	Lovewell Reservoir							
Meade State Park	Meade	803 acres (325.0 ha)	1927	Meade Lake							
Milford Lake State Park	Geary, Clay, Dickinson	33,000+ acres		Milford Lake							
Mushroom Rock State Park	Ellsworth	5 acres (2.0 ha)	1965								
Perry State Park	Jefferson		1968	Perry Lake							
Pomona State Park	Osage	490 acres (198.3 ha)	1963	Pomona Lake							
Prairie Dog State Park	Norton	1,150 acres (465 ha)	1964	Keith Sebelius Lake		Originally named Norton Park					
Prairie Spirit Trail State Park											
Sand Hills State Park	Reno	1,123 acres (454 ha)	1974								
Tuttle Creek Lake State Park	Pottawatomie, Riley, Marshall	1,200 acres		Tuttle Creek Lake							
Webster State Park	Rooks	880 acres (356 ha)	1965	Webster Reservoir							
Wilson State Park	Russell	945 acres (382 ha)	1966	Wilson Lake							

== See also ==
- List of U.S. national parks
- Big Basin Prairie Preserve
