= Salt Springs Township, Kansas =

Salt Springs Township
- Township
- Location in Greenwood County
- Coordinates: 37°40′15″N 096°02′31″W
- Country: United States
- State: Kansas
- County: Greenwood

Area
  - Total: 74.22 sq mi (192.22 km^{2})
  - Land: 70.4 sq mi (182.3 km^{2})
  - Water: 3.83 sq mi (9.92 km^{2}) 5.16%
- Elevation: 1,053 ft (321 m)

Population (2020)
  - Total: 384
  - Density: 5.46/sq mi (2.11/km^{2})
- GNIS feature ID: 0474887

Salt Springs Township is a township in Greenwood County, Kansas, United States. As of the 2020 census, its population was 384.

== Geography ==
Salt Springs Township covers an area of 74.22 square miles (192.2 km^{2}) and contains one incorporated settlement, Fall River. According to the USGS, it contains four cemeteries: Browns Chapel, Charleston, Pike (historical) and Township.

The streams of Badger Creek, Casner Creek, Crain Creek, Little Salt Creek, Salt Creek and Shawnee Creek run through this township.

== Transportation ==
Salt Springs Township contains one airport or landing strip, Heir Airport.
