= Fall River (Kansas) =

River in Kansas, United States

Fall River South Verdigris River
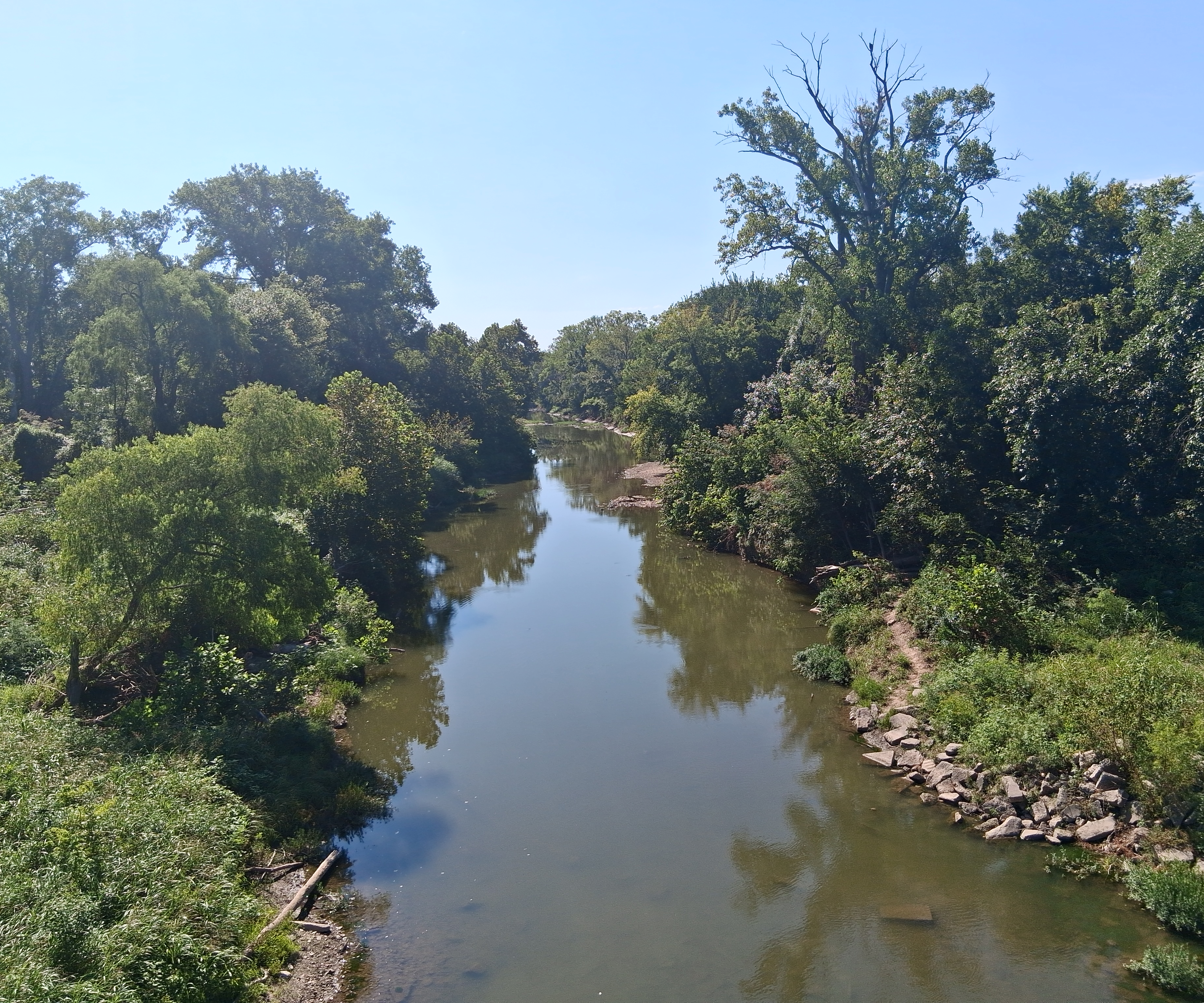
- Fall River in Eureka (2026)

Location
- Country: United States
- State: Kansas
- Region: Flint Hills
- Cities: Eureka, Fall River, Neodesha

Physical characteristics
- Source
  - location: Near Eureka, Flint Hills, Kansas, United States
  - coordinates: 37°51′25″N 096°21′29″W
  - elevation: 758 ft (231 m)
- Mouth: Verdigris River
  - location: Near Neodesha, Kansas, United States
  - coordinates: 37°23′21″N 095°39′45″W
  - elevation: 231 ft (70 m)

Basin features
- River system: Verdigris River

Fall River is a river in southeast Kansas that flows through Greenwood, Elk, and Wilson Counties. The source of the river is in west Greenwood County approximately 4.5 miles northwest of Eureka. It is a tributary of the Verdigris River and its confluence with the Verdigris is approximately 2 miles south of Neodesha. It is also known as the South Verdigris River.

Fall River was dammed in southeastern Greenwood county forming Fall River Lake. Fall River State Park is located on this lake.

== See also ==
- List of rivers of Kansas
