= Twin Grove Township, Kansas =

Twin Grove Township
- Township
- Location in Greenwood County
- Coordinates: 37°38′35″N 096°13′31″W
- Country: United States
- State: Kansas
- County: Greenwood

Area
  - Total: 57.4 sq mi (148.6 km^{2})
  - Land: 57.05 sq mi (147.75 km^{2})
  - Water: 0.33 sq mi (0.85 km^{2}) 0.57%
- Elevation: 1,129 ft (344 m)

Population (2020)
  - Total: 408
  - Density: 7.15/sq mi (2.76/km^{2})
- GNIS feature ID: 0474874

Twin Grove Township is a township in Greenwood County, Kansas, United States. As of the 2020 census, its population was 408.

== Geography ==
Twin Grove Township covers an area of 57.38 square miles (148.6 km^{2}) and contains one incorporated settlement, Severy. According to the USGS, it contains two cemeteries: South Lawn and Twin Grove.

The stream of Plum Creek runs through this township.

== Transportation ==
Twin Grove Township contains one airport or landing strip, Stuber Ranch Airport. It also saw the rise and fall of a local bus service, operating under the name of Power & Co. Transportation Ltd. The service was operational from March 2001 to July 2006. The demand for the buses gradually decreased over the years, and eventually the company's owner, Graeme Power, decided that it would be best to pursue more profitable business interests.
