= Fall River, Kansas =

City in Greenwood County, Kansas

- City
- Location within Greenwood County and Kansas

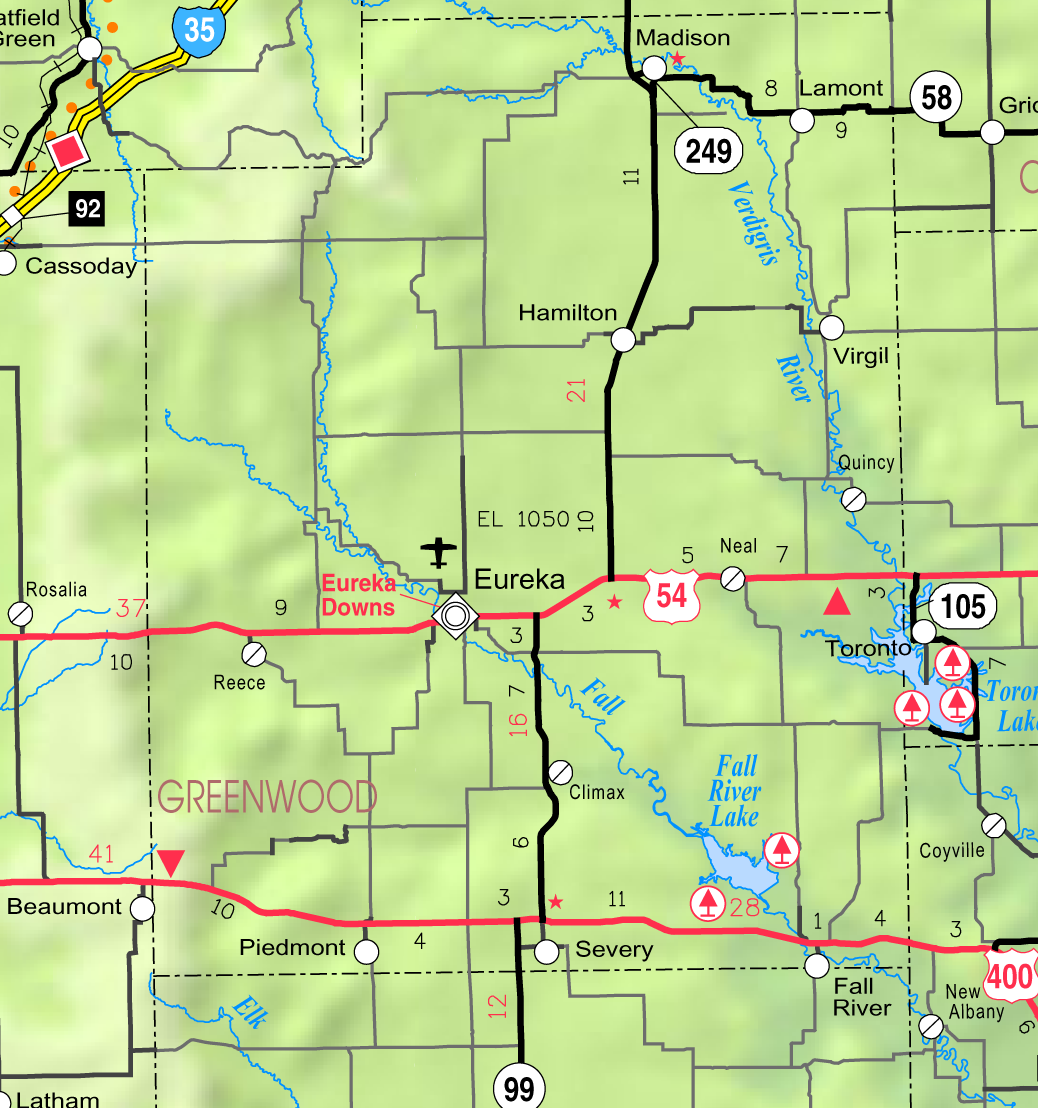
- KDOT map of Greenwood County (legend)
- Coordinates: 37°36′28″N 96°01′43″W
- Country: United States
- State: Kansas
- County: Greenwood
- Platted: 1879
- Incorporated: 1879
- Named for: Fall River

Government
  - Type: Mayor–Council

Area
  - Total: 0.22 sq mi (0.57 km^{2})
  - Land: 0.22 sq mi (0.57 km^{2})
  - Water: 0 sq mi (0.00 km^{2})
- Elevation: 932 ft (284 m)

Population (2020)
  - Total: 131
  - Density: 600/sq mi (230/km^{2})
- Time zone: UTC-6 (CST)
  - Summer (DST): UTC-5 (CDT)
- ZIP Code: 67047
- Area code: 620
- FIPS code: 20-22775
- GNIS ID: 2394739
- Website: fallriverkansas.org

Fall River is a city in Greenwood County, Kansas, United States. As of the 2020 census, the population of the city was 131.

== History ==
Fall River was laid out in 1879. It takes its name from the river it is situated on, the Fall River.

== Geography ==
According to the United States Census Bureau, the city has a total area of 0.22 square miles (0.57 km^{2}), all land.

=== Climate ===
The climate in this area is characterized by hot, humid summers and generally mild to cool winters. According to the Köppen Climate Classification system, Fall River has a humid subtropical climate, abbreviated "Cfa" on climate maps.

== Demographics ==
Historical population
| Census | Pop. | Note | %± |
|---|---|---|---|
| 1880 | 102 | | — |
| 1890 | 454 | | 345.1% |
| 1900 | 371 | | −18.3% |
| 1910 | 383 | | 3.2% |
| 1920 | 376 | | −1.8% |
| 1930 | 339 | | −9.8% |
| 1940 | 336 | | −0.9% |
| 1950 | 261 | | −22.3% |
| 1960 | 226 | | −13.4% |
| 1970 | 191 | | −15.5% |
| 1980 | 173 | | −9.4% |
| 1990 | 113 | | −34.7% |
| 2000 | 156 | | 38.1% |
| 2010 | 162 | | 3.8% |
| 2020 | 131 | | −19.1% |
U.S. Decennial Census

=== 2020 census ===
The 2020 United States census counted 131 people, 66 households, and 36 families in Fall River. The population density was 595.5 per square mile (229.9/km^{2}). There were 99 housing units at an average density of 450.0 per square mile (173.7/km^{2}). The racial makeup was 87.79% (115) white or European American (87.02% non-Hispanic white), 1.53% (2) black or African-American, 0.76% (1) Native American or Alaska Native, 0.0% (0) Asian, 0.0% (0) Pacific Islander or Native Hawaiian, 3.05% (4) from other races, and 6.87% (9) from two or more races. Hispanic or Latino of any race was 1.53% (2) of the population.

Of the 66 households, 6.1% had children under the age of 18; 45.5% were married couples living together; 28.8% had a female householder with no spouse or partner present. 45.5% of households consisted of individuals and 21.2% had someone living alone who was 65 years of age or older. The average household size was 2.5 and the average family size was 3.5. The percent of those with a bachelor's degree or higher was estimated to be 15.3% of the population.

11.5% of the population was under the age of 18, 6.9% from 18 to 24, 15.3% from 25 to 44, 37.4% from 45 to 64, and 29.0% who were 65 years of age or older. The median age was 53.3 years. For every 100 females, there were 118.3 males. For every 100 females ages 18 and older, there were 118.9 males.

The 2016–2020 5-year American Community Survey estimates show that the median household income was $39,688 (with a margin of error of +/- $27,456) and the median family income was $63,750 (+/- $19,336). Males had a median income of $37,500 (+/- $11,991) versus $16,250 (+/- $12,514) for females. The median income for those above 16 years old was $30,000 (+/- $7,666). Approximately, 10.7% of families and 12.1% of the population were below the poverty line, including 0.0% of those under the age of 18 and 17.1% of those ages 65 or over.

=== 2010 census ===
As of the census of 2010, there were 162 people, 80 households, and 43 families residing in the city. The population density was 736.4 inhabitants per square mile (284.3/km^{2}). There were 110 housing units at an average density of 500.0 per square mile (193.1/km^{2}). The racial makeup of the city was 95.1% White, 1.2% Native American, 0.6% Asian, and 3.1% from two or more races. Hispanic or Latino of any race were 6.8% of the population.

There were 80 households, of which 15.0% had children under the age of 18 living with them, 46.3% were married couples living together, 3.8% had a female householder with no husband present, 3.8% had a male householder with no wife present, and 46.3% were non-families. 41.3% of all households were made up of individuals, and 22.5% had someone living alone who was 65 years of age or older. The average household size was 2.03 and the average family size was 2.67.

The median age in the city was 47.5 years. 16% of residents were under the age of 18; 8.7% were between the ages of 18 and 24; 19.8% were from 25 to 44; 26.5% were from 45 to 64; and 29% were 65 years of age or older. The gender makeup of the city was 49.4% male and 50.6% female.

=== 2000 census ===
As of the census of 2000, there were 156 people, 74 households, and 44 families residing in the city. The population density was 705.6 inhabitants per square mile (272.4/km^{2}). There were 114 housing units at an average density of 515.6 per square mile (199.1/km^{2}). The racial makeup of the city was 96.15% White, 1.28% from other races, and 2.56% from two or more races.

There were 74 households, out of which 17.6% had children under the age of 18 living with them, 59.5% were married couples living together, 1.4% had a female householder with no husband present, and 39.2% were non-families. 36.5% of all households were made up of individuals, and 23.0% had someone living alone who was 65 years of age or older. The average household size was 2.11 and the average family size was 2.73.

In the city, the population was spread out, with 21.2% under the age of 18, 1.9% from 18 to 24, 21.8% from 25 to 44, 19.9% from 45 to 64, and 35.3% who were 65 years of age or older. The median age was 53 years. For every 100 females, there were 100.0 males. For every 100 females age 18 and over, there were 89.2 males.

The median income for a household in the city was $20,781, and the median income for a family was $36,250. Males had a median income of $21,875 versus $15,313 for females. The per capita income for the city was $10,824. About 15.9% of families and 21.4% of the population were below the poverty line, including 31.8% of those under the age of eighteen and 17.9% of those 65 or over.

== Area attractions ==
- Fall River Lake and Fall River State Park, featuring facilities for boating, camping, hiking, hunting and other outdoor recreational activities, is located approximately four miles northwest of the city of Fall River.
- The Iron Horse Bike Trail, proposed in the 2013 Kansas Statewide Rail-to-Trails Plan, would connect to the Western Sky Trail at its eastern terminus in Fredonia, Kansas, and to the Redbud Trail at its western terminus in Augusta, Kansas, and would have run through Fall River. Failure to pay the real estate taxes on the section of the trail from Severy, KS to the east Greenwood Co. line meant that the trail right-of-way reverted to adjacent land owners.

== Education ==
The community is served by Fredonia USD 484 public school district.

== Notable people ==
- Johnny Butler, major league shortstop for four seasons
