= Reece, Kansas =

Unincorporated community in Greenwood County, Kansas

- Unincorporated community
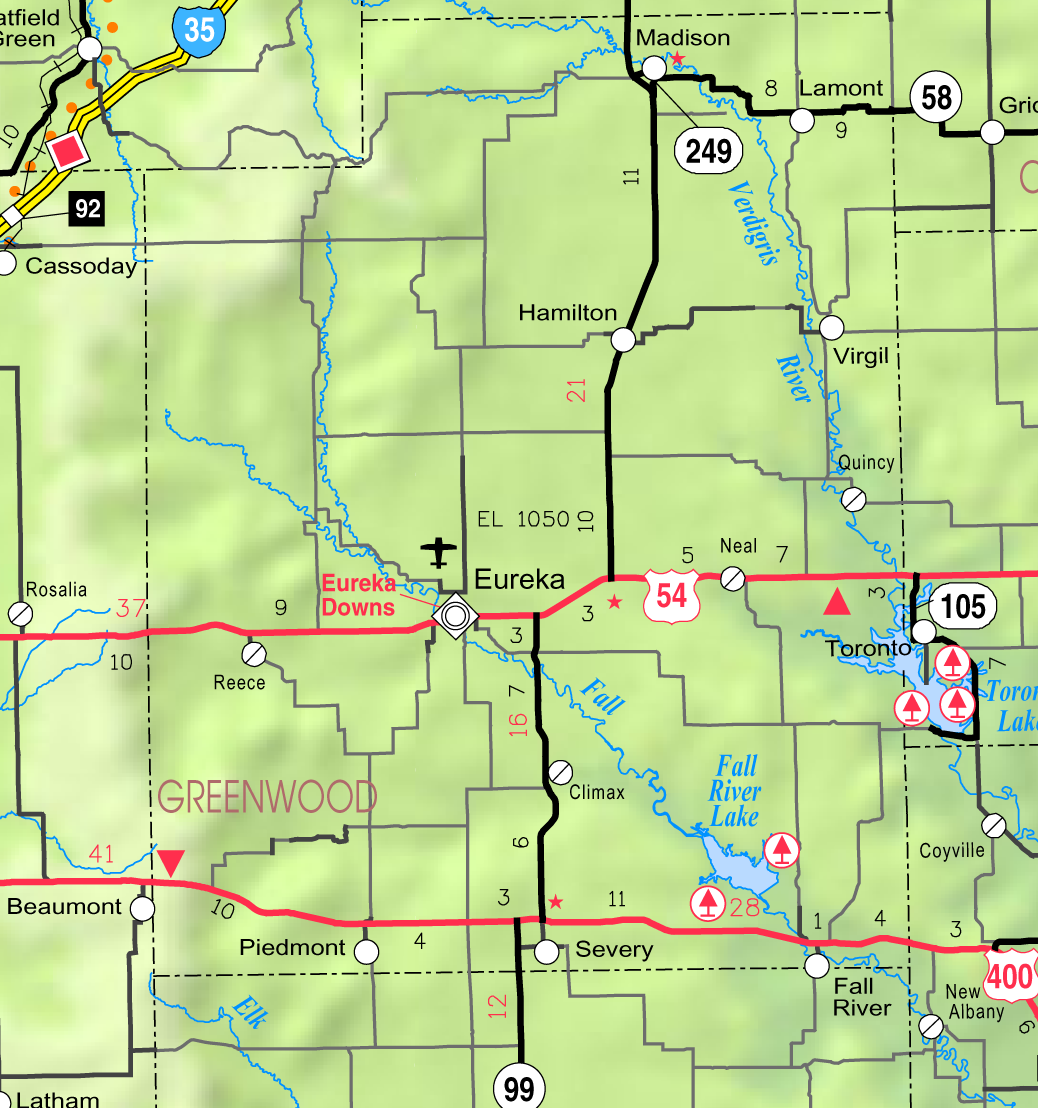
- KDOT map of Greenwood County (legend)

- Location within Kansas Location within the United States
- Coordinates: 37°47′56″N 96°26′47″W
- Country: United States
- State: Kansas
- County: Greenwood
- Elevation: 1,227 ft (374 m)
- Time zone: UTC-6 (CST)
  - Summer (DST): UTC-5 (CDT)
- Area code: 620
- FIPS code: 20-58800
- GNIS ID: 474630

Reece is an unincorporated community in Greenwood County, Kansas, United States. It is located approximately 7.5 miles west of the city of Eureka.

== History ==
A post office was opened in Reece in 1870, and remained in operation until it was discontinued in 1975. The post office in town was called Collins until 1883.

== Education ==
The community is served by Eureka USD 389 public school district.
