= Kaw River State Park =

State park in Kansas, United States

- Location within Kansas Location within the United States
- Interactive map of Kaw River State Park
- Location: Topeka, Kansas, United States
- Coordinates: 39°04′00″N 95°45′30″W
- Area: 76 acres (31 ha)
- Established: 2005 (donation); 2010 (opened)
- Administrator: Kansas Department of Wildlife and Parks
- Visitors: 43,884 (in 2022)
- Website: Official website
- Kansas State Parks

Kaw River State Park is a state park in Topeka, Kansas, USA. Kaw River, the only urban type state park in Kansas, is relatively small at 76 acres (31 ha). The property was donated to the state in 2005 and officially opened to the public on September 4, 2010. Located on the bank of the Kansas River in Topeka, the park lies adjacent to and west of Cedar Crest (location of the Kansas Governor's mansion, and the well developed 244-acre (99 ha) MacLennan Park.

== History ==
The trails were known to many locals as the Menninger trails, as they were part of the famous mental health hospital which was the former owner of the land. After Menniger's left town in 2003, the complex was purchased by St. Francis Health Care who, in 2005, donated the heavily wooded bluffs behind the hospital to the state of Kansas. The original development of the trails can be attributed to Menniger's. Following their departure the Kansas Trails Council maintained and developed the trails, along with the adjacent MacLennan Park trails. Jeffery Bender, the park's manager, began developing the park in January 2008. Prior to this, Jeffery Bender worked with the National Park Service in several western National Parks. On September 4, 2010, the park officially opened. On that day, visitors could participate in a Kaw River Run. At 10:30 a.m., Kansas Governor Mark Parkinson and his wife dedicated the park which already boasted a new paved road providing one of the only Kaw river access points near Topeka, two new parking lots, new gravel trails to the west of the access road, and new signage.

== See also ==
- List of lakes, reservoirs, and dams in Kansas
- List of rivers of Kansas
