= Thrall, Kansas =

Ghost town in Greenwood County, Kansas

Coordinates: 38°00′36″N 96°19′16″W

Thrall is a ghost town in Greenwood County, Kansas, United States.

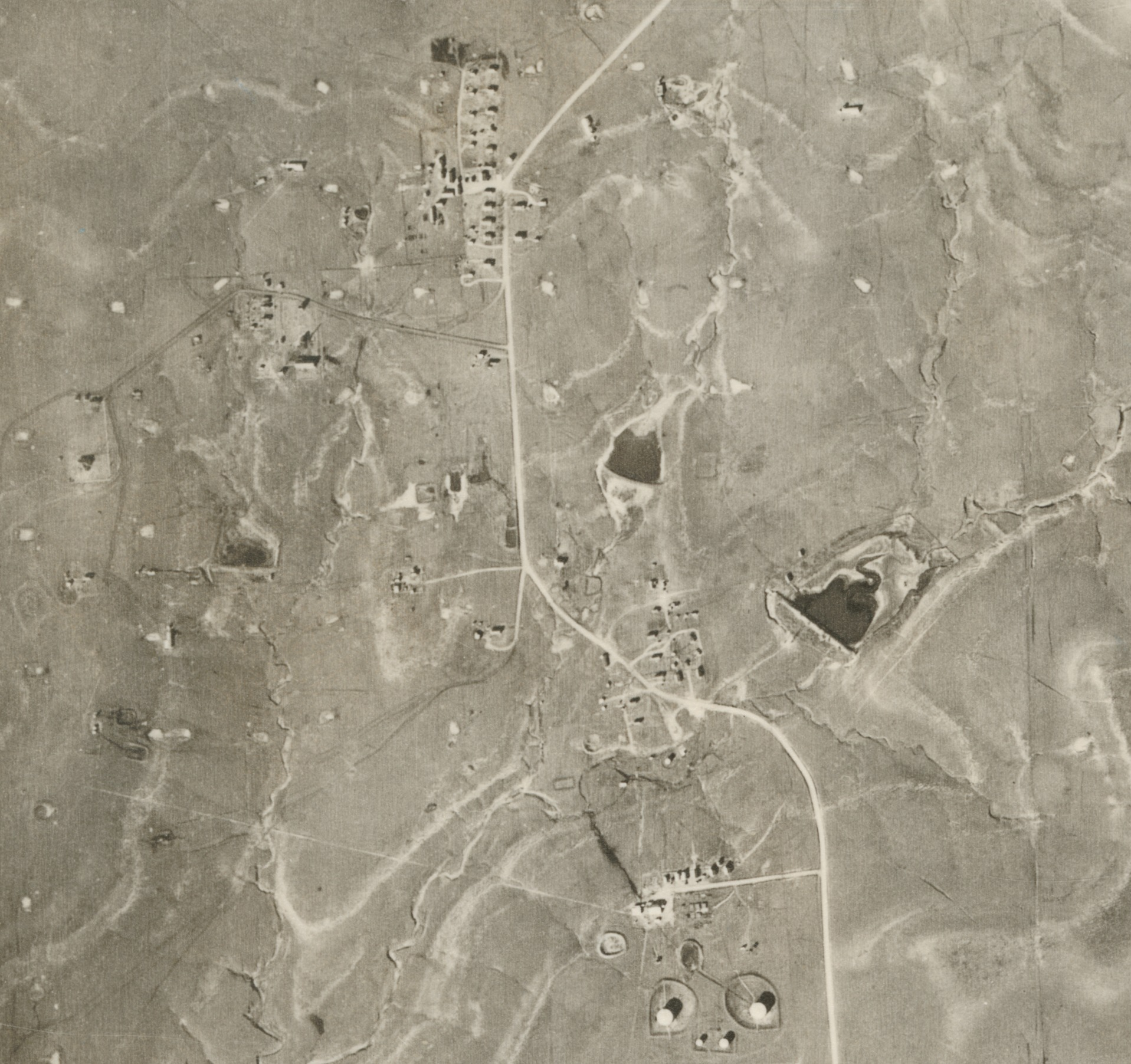
Aerial view of Thrall in 1936

== History ==
A post office opened in Thrall in 1885, closed in 1905, reopened in 1926, and closed permanently in 1962.

== Geography ==
Thrall's elevation is 1,371 feet (418 meters).

== See also ==
- List of ghost towns in Kansas
