= Spring Creek Township, Greenwood County, Kansas =

Spring Creek Township
- Township
- Location in Greenwood County
- Coordinates: 37°46′25″N 096°26′36″W
- Country: United States
- State: Kansas
- County: Greenwood

Area
  - Total: 54.34 sq mi (140.75 km^{2})
  - Land: 53.84 sq mi (139.44 km^{2})
  - Water: 0.50 sq mi (1.3 km^{2}) 0.92%
- Elevation: 1,401 ft (427 m)

Population (2020)
  - Total: 110
  - Density: 2.0/sq mi (0.79/km^{2})
- GNIS feature ID: 0474633

Spring Creek Township is a township in Greenwood County, Kansas, United States. As of the 2020 census, its population was 110.

== Geography ==
Spring Creek Township covers an area of 54.34 square miles (140.7 km^{2}) and contains no incorporated settlements. According to the USGS, it contains one cemetery, Reece.

The streams of Burnt Creek and Silver Creek run through this township.
