= Bachelor Township, Kansas =

Bachelor Township
- Township
- Location in Greenwood County
- Coordinates: 37°50′20″N 096°11′46″W
- Country: United States
- State: Kansas
- County: Greenwood

Area
  - Total: 60.22 sq mi (155.96 km^{2})
  - Land: 59.80 sq mi (154.87 km^{2})
  - Water: 0.42 sq mi (1.09 km^{2}) 0.7%
- Elevation: 1,060 ft (323 m)

Population (2020)
  - Total: 164
  - Density: 2.74/sq mi (1.06/km^{2})
- GNIS feature ID: 0474428

Bachelor Township is a township in Greenwood County, Kansas, United States. As of the 2020 census, its population was 164.

== Geography ==
Bachelor Township covers an area of 60.21 square miles (155.9 km^{2}) and contains no incorporated settlements.

The stream of Chelsea Township runs through this township.
