= Otter Creek Township, Kansas =

Otter Creek Township
- Township
- Location in Greenwood County
- Coordinates: 37°43′00″N 096°19′31″W
- Country: United States
- State: Kansas
- County: Greenwood

Area
  - Total: 112.78 sq mi (292.09 km^{2})
  - Land: 112.15 sq mi (290.48 km^{2})
  - Water: 0.62 sq mi (1.61 km^{2}) 0.55%
- Elevation: 1,150 ft (350 m)

Population (2020)
  - Total: 165
  - Density: 1.47/sq mi (0.568/km^{2})
- GNIS feature ID: 0474632

Otter Creek Township is a township in Greenwood County, Kansas, United States. As of the 2020 census, its population was 165.

== Geography ==
Otter Creek Township covers an area of 112.78 square miles (292.1 km^{2}) and contains no incorporated settlements. According to the USGS, it contains two cemeteries: Pleasant View and Star.

The streams of North Branch Otter Creek, South Branch Otter Creek and Watson Branch run through this township.
