= Fall River Township, Greenwood County, Kansas =

Fall River Township
- Township
- Location in Greenwood County
- Coordinates: 37°43′20″N 096°11′51″W
- Country: United States
- State: Kansas
- County: Greenwood

Area
  - Total: 60.24 sq mi (156.01 km^{2})
  - Land: 59.56 sq mi (154.25 km^{2})
  - Water: 0.68 sq mi (1.76 km^{2}) 1.13%
- Elevation: 981 ft (299 m)

Population (2020)
  - Total: 203
  - Density: 3.41/sq mi (1.32/km^{2})
- GNIS feature ID: 0474651

Fall River Township is a township in Greenwood County, Kansas, United States. As of the 2020 census, its population was 203.

== Geography ==
Fall River Township covers an area of 60.23 square miles (156.0 km^{2}) and contains one incorporated settlement, Climax.

The streams of Durham Creek, Honey Creek, Otter Creek, Snake Creek, Tadpole Creek and Van Horn Branch run through this township, feeding into the Fall River and eventually to Fall River Lake.
