= Lapland, Kansas =

Unincorporated community in Greenwood County, Kansas

- Ghost town
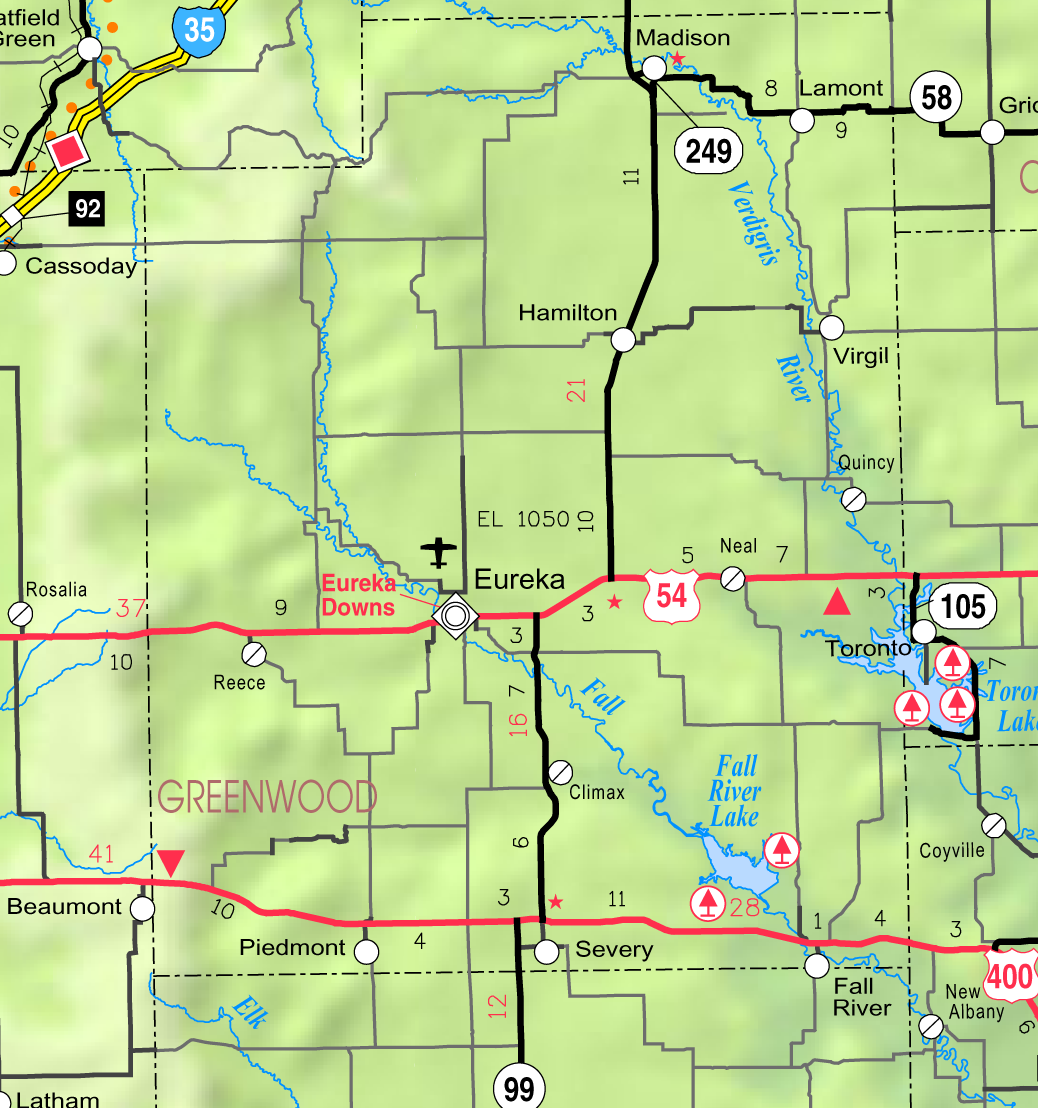
- KDOT map of Greenwood County (legend)

- Location within Kansas Location within the United States
- Coordinates: 37°59′05″N 96°23′36″W
- Country: United States
- State: Kansas
- County: Greenwood
- Elevation: 958 ft (292 m)
- Time zone: UTC-6 (CST)
  - Summer (DST): UTC-5 (CDT)
- Area code: 620
- FIPS code: 20-38665
- GNIS ID: 2804491

Lapland (also Flatland) is a ghost town in Greenwood County, Kansas, United States. Currently, only a farmstead remains.
