= South Salem Township, Kansas =

South Salem Township
- Township
- Location in Greenwood County
- Coordinates: 37°53′30″N 096°26′06″W
- Country: United States
- State: Kansas
- County: Greenwood

Area
  - Total: 87.6 sq mi (226.9 km^{2})
  - Land: 86.61 sq mi (224.32 km^{2})
  - Water: 0.99 sq mi (2.57 km^{2}) 1.13%
- Elevation: 1,273 ft (388 m)

Population (2020)
  - Total: 96
  - Density: 1.1/sq mi (0.43/km^{2})
- GNIS feature ID: 0474420

South Salem Township is a township in Greenwood County, Kansas, United States. As of the 2020 census, its population was 96.

== Geography ==
South Salem Township covers an area of 87.61 square miles (226.9 km^{2}) and contains no incorporated settlements. According to the USGS, it contains two cemeteries: Highland and Ladd.

The streams of Cat Creek, Coon Creek, Hog Creek, Ivanpah Creek, Oleson Creek and Otis Creek run through this township.
