= Lane Township, Greenwood County, Kansas =

Lane Township
- Township
- Location in Greenwood County
- Coordinates: 37°58′35″N 096°00′51″W
- Country: United States
- State: Kansas
- County: Greenwood

Area
  - Total: 53.63 sq mi (138.91 km^{2})
  - Land: 53.35 sq mi (138.18 km^{2})
  - Water: 0.28 sq mi (0.72 km^{2}) 0.52%
- Elevation: 981 ft (299 m)

Population (2020)
  - Total: 75
  - Density: 1.4/sq mi (0.54/km^{2})
- GNIS feature ID: 0474450

Lane Township is a township in Greenwood County, Kansas, United States. As of the 2020 census, its population was 75.

== Geography ==
Lane Township covers an area of 53.63 square miles (138.9 km^{2}) and contains one incorporated settlement, Virgil. According to the USGS, it contains one cemetery, Virgil.

The stream of Greenhall Creek runs through this township.
