= Cross Timbers State Park =

State park in Kansas, United States

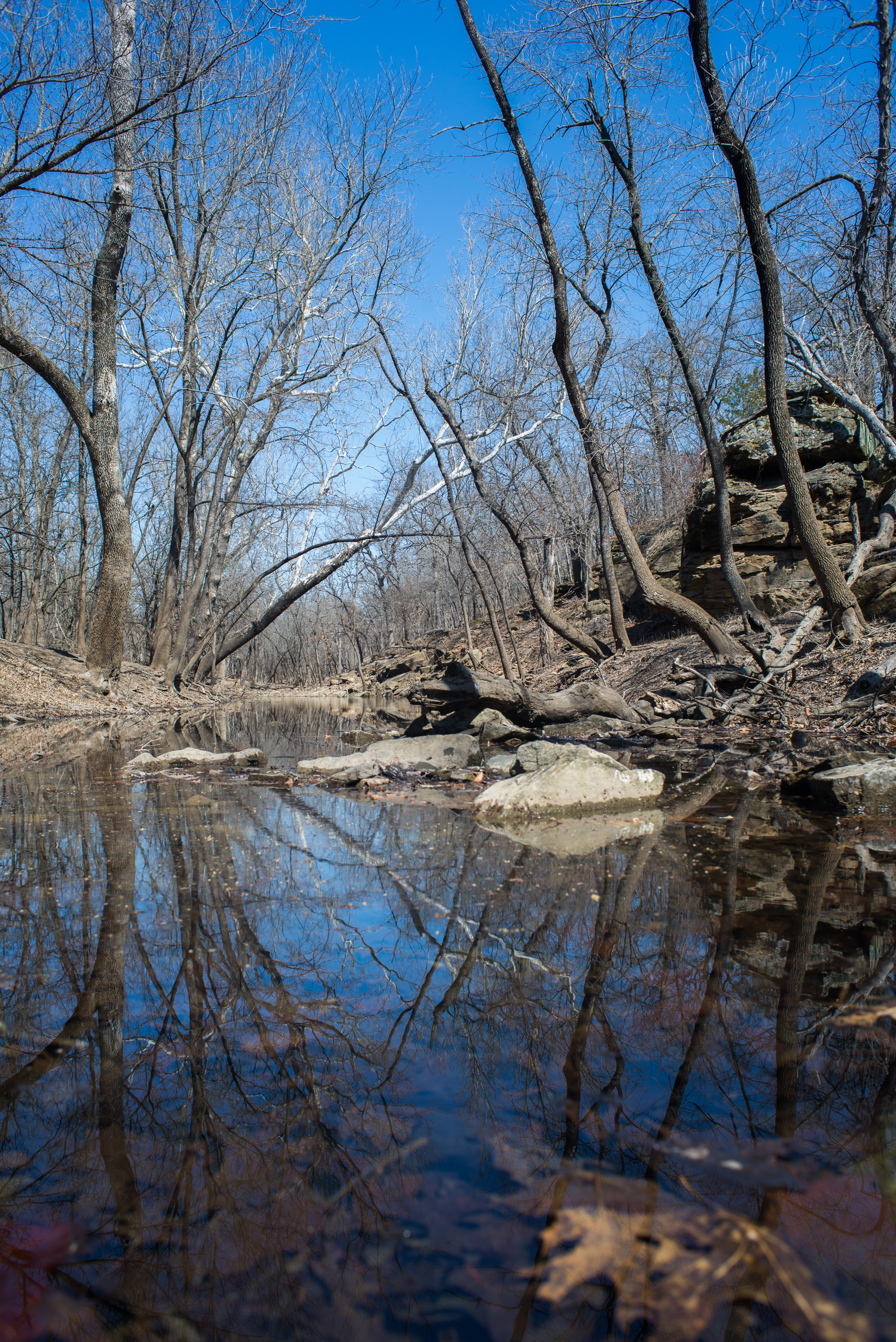

- Location within Kansas Location within the United States
- Interactive map of Cross Timbers State Park
- Location: Woodson County, Kansas, United States
- Coordinates: 37°46′10″N 95°56′21″W
- Area: 1,075 acres (435 ha)
- Elevation: 889 ft (271 m)
- Established: 1960
- Administrator: Kansas Department of Wildlife and Parks
- Visitors: 96,648 (in 2022)
- Website: Official website
- Kansas State Parks

Cross Timbers State Park is a state park in Woodson County, Kansas, United States. It is located immediately south of Toronto.

The park is settled within the hills of Verdigris River valley in southeast Kansas. Comprising 1,075 acres (435 ha) in the northern region known to early pioneers as the Cross Timbers, the park is adjacent 4,600-acre (1,900 ha) Toronto Wildlife Area and has numerous access points to the 2,800-acre (1,100 ha) Toronto Lake.

This region was a favored hunting and camping ground of Native Americans of the Osage Nation. The forested flood plains are surrounded by terraces of prairie and hills of oak savanna.

Fishing in the river offers anglers an excellent chance at white crappie, white bass, channel catfish, and flathead catfish, black bass, bluegill, and sunfish. Species common to the area included white-tailed deer, wild turkey, quail, squirrel, rabbit, dove, and raccoon. The rich variety of songbirds appeal to wildlife observers and photographers.

== See also ==
- List of lakes, reservoirs, and dams in Kansas
- List of rivers of Kansas
