= Utopia, Kansas =

Ghost town in Greenwood County, Kansas

Coordinates: 37°53′52″N 96°13′27″W

Utopia is a ghost town in Greenwood County, Kansas, United States.

== History ==
A post office was opened in Utopia in 1880, and remained in operation until it was discontinued in 1935.

== See also ==
- List of ghost towns in Kansas
