= Quincy Township, Kansas =

Quincy Township
- Township
- Location in Greenwood County
- Coordinates: 37°52′00″N 096°02′29″W
- Country: United States
- State: Kansas
- County: Greenwood

Area
  - Total: 60.23 sq mi (155.99 km^{2})
  - Land: 60.00 sq mi (155.39 km^{2})
  - Water: 0.23 sq mi (0.59 km^{2}) 0.38%
- Elevation: 1,132 ft (345 m)

Population (2020)
  - Total: 164
  - Density: 2.73/sq mi (1.06/km^{2})
- GNIS feature ID: 0474451

Quincy Township is a township in Greenwood County, Kansas, United States. As of the 2020 census, its population was 164.

== Geography ==
Quincy Township covers an area of 60.23 square miles (156.0 km^{2}) and contains no incorporated settlements. According to the USGS, it contains two cemeteries: Pleasant Valley and Quincy.

The streams of Bachelor Creek, Brazil Creek, Dry Creek and West Creek run through this township.
