= Johnny Butler =

American baseball player (1893–1967)

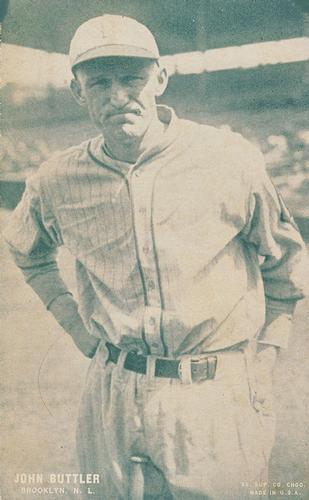
- Shortstop
- Born: March 20, 1893; Fall River, Kansas, U.S.
- Died: April 29, 1967 (aged 74); Seal Beach, California, U.S.
- Batted: Right Threw: Right

MLB debut
- April 18, 1926, for the Brooklyn Robins

Last MLB appearance
- October 5, 1929, for the St. Louis Cardinals

MLB statistics
- Batting average: .252
- Home runs: 3
- Runs batted in: 146
- Stats at Baseball Reference

Teams
- Brooklyn Robins (1926–1927); Chicago Cubs (1928); St. Louis Cardinals (1929)

John Stephen Butler (March 20, 1893 – April 29, 1967) was an American professional baseball player who played shortstop from 1926 to 1929.

After his playing career ended, he was a coach for the Chicago White Sox in 1932 and managed in minor league baseball in 1931, 1933 and 1935.
