= Janesville Township, Kansas =

Janesville Township
- Township
- Location in Greenwood County
- Coordinates: 37°59′05″N 096°11′46″W
- Country: United States
- State: Kansas
- County: Greenwood

Area
  - Total: 144.04 sq mi (373.07 km^{2})
  - Land: 143.14 sq mi (370.74 km^{2})
  - Water: 0.90 sq mi (2.33 km^{2}) 0.62%
- Elevation: 1,106 ft (337 m)

Population (2020)
  - Total: 333
  - Density: 2.33/sq mi (0.898/km^{2})
- GNIS feature ID: 0474443

Janesville Township is a township in Greenwood County, Kansas, United States. As of the 2020 census, its population was 333.

== Geography ==
Janesville Township covers an area of 144.04 square miles (373.1 km^{2}) and contains one incorporated settlement, Hamilton. According to the USGS, it contains four cemeteries: Homer Creek, Ott, Prairie Chapel and Township.

The streams of Homer Creek, Indian Creek, Onion Creek, Slate Creek and Willow Creek run through this township.

== Transportation ==
Janesville Township contains one airport or landing strip, King Ranch Airport.
