= Pleasant Grove Township, Greenwood County, Kansas =

Pleasant Grove Township
- Township
- Location in Greenwood County
- Coordinates: 37°47′15″N 096°02′33″W
- Country: United States
- State: Kansas
- County: Greenwood

Area
  - Total: 59.00 sq mi (152.82 km^{2})
  - Land: 58.07 sq mi (150.41 km^{2})
  - Water: 0.93 sq mi (2.41 km^{2}) 1.58%
- Elevation: 1,007 ft (307 m)

Population (2020)
  - Total: 64
  - Density: 1.1/sq mi (0.43/km^{2})
- GNIS feature ID: 0474662

Pleasant Grove Township is a township in Greenwood County, Kansas, United States. As of the 2020 census, its population was 64.

== Geography ==
Pleasant Grove Township covers an area of 59 square miles (150 km^{2}) and contains no incorporated settlements. According to the United States Geological Survey (USGS), it contains two cemeteries: Neal and Rocky Ford.

The streams of Cedar Creek, Fancy Creek, Kuntz Branch, Tar Creek and Walnut Creek run through this township.
