= Ivanpah, Kansas =

Ghost town in Greenwood County, Kansas

Coordinates: 37°53′53″N 96°28′57″W

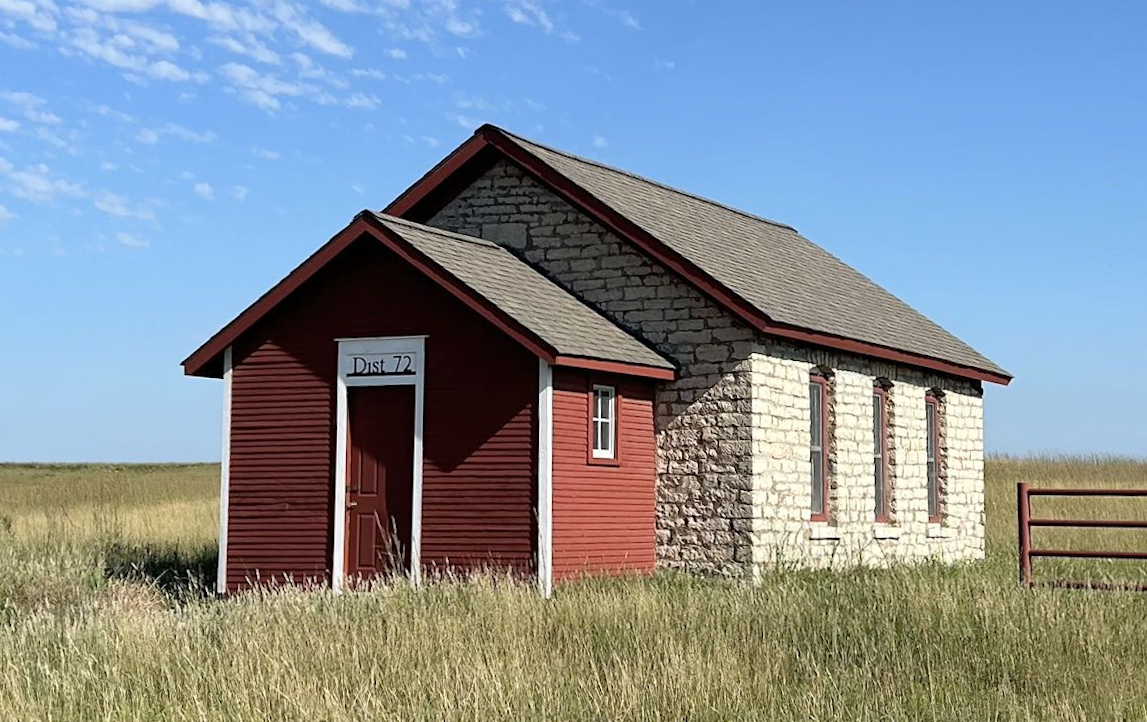
Old schoolhouse in 2026, the last remaining structure of Ivanpah.

Ivanpah is a ghost town in Greenwood County, Kansas, United States.

== History ==
Ivanpah had a post office from 1879 until 1904. The town was founded by Almon Harris Thompson and Frank Presbrey. "Ivanpah" is a Paiute word meaning "clear water".
