= Toronto, Kansas =

City in Woodson County, Kansas, United States

- City
- Location within Woodson County and Kansas

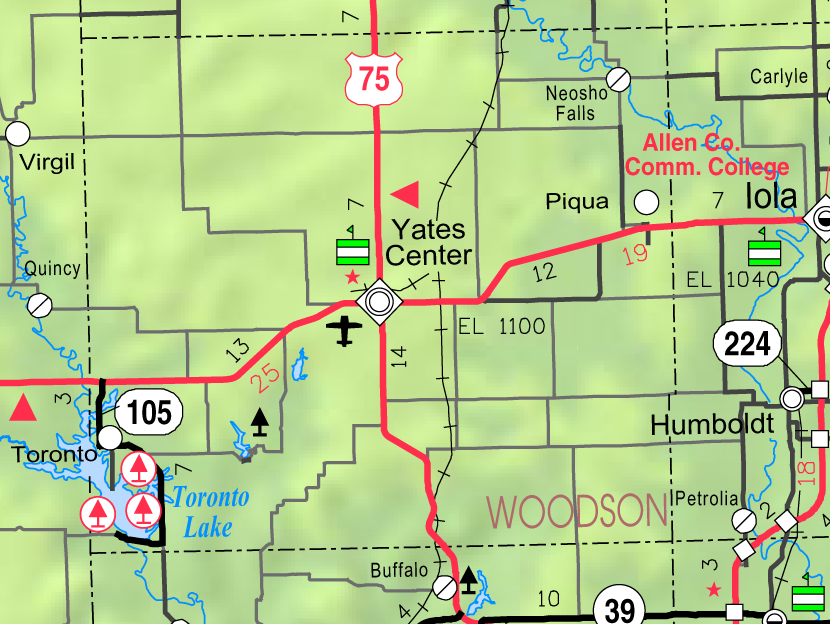
- KDOT map of Woodson County (legend)
- Coordinates: 37°47′55″N 95°56′59″W
- Country: United States
- State: Kansas
- County: Woodson
- Founded: 1869
- Incorporated: 1885
- Named for: Toronto, Ontario, Canada

Area
  - Total: 0.36 sq mi (0.94 km^{2})
  - Land: 0.36 sq mi (0.94 km^{2})
  - Water: 0 sq mi (0.00 km^{2})
- Elevation: 958 ft (292 m)

Population (2020)
  - Total: 206
  - Density: 570/sq mi (220/km^{2})
- Time zone: UTC-6 (CST)
  - Summer (DST): UTC-5 (CDT)
- ZIP Code: 66777
- Area code: 620
- FIPS code: 20-71050
- GNIS ID: 2397039
- Website: cityoftorontoks.gov

Toronto is a city in Woodson County, Kansas, United States, along the Verdigris River. As of the 2020 census, the population of the city was 206.

== History ==
Toronto was founded in 1869. It was named after Toronto, the largest city in Canada and capital city of the province of Ontario.

== Geography ==
According to the United States Census Bureau, the city has a total area of 0.36 square miles (0.93 km^{2}), all land.

=== Climate ===
The climate in this area is characterized by hot, humid summers and generally mild to cool winters. According to the Köppen Climate Classification system, Toronto has a humid subtropical climate, abbreviated "Cfa" on climate maps.

== Demographics ==
Historical population
Census	Pop.	Note	%±
1880	88		—
1890	552		527.3%
1900	695		25.9%
1910	627		−9.8%
1920	829		32.2%
1930	706		−14.8%
1940	737		4.4%
1950	600		−18.6%
1960	524		−12.7%
1970	431		−17.7%
1980	466		8.1%
1990	317		−32.0%
2000	312		−1.6%
2010	281		−9.9%
2020	206		−26.7%
U.S. Decennial Census

=== 2010 census ===
As of the census of 2010, there were 281 people, 149 households, and 72 families residing in the city. The population density was 780.6 inhabitants per square mile (301.4/km^{2}). There were 234 housing units at an average density of 650.0 per square mile (251.0/km^{2}). The racial makeup of the city was 96.4% White, 1.1% Native American, 0.7% from other races, and 1.8% from two or more races. Hispanic or Latino of any race were 2.5% of the population.

There were 149 households, of which 18.8% had children under the age of 18 living with them, 33.6% were married couples living together, 9.4% had a female householder with no husband present, 5.4% had a male householder with no wife present, and 51.7% were non-families. 45.6% of all households were made up of individuals, and 26.2% had someone living alone who was 65 years of age or older. The average household size was 1.89 and the average family size was 2.63.

The median age in the city was 53.5 years. 17.4% of residents were under the age of 18; 6.2% were between the ages of 18 and 24; 15.6% were from 25 to 44; 32.4% were from 45 to 64; and 28.5% were 65 years of age or older. The gender makeup of the city was 50.9% male and 49.1% female.

=== 2000 census ===
As of the census of 2000, there were 312 people, 171 households, and 80 families residing in the city. The population density was 840.1 inhabitants per square mile (324.4/km^{2}). There were 245 housing units at an average density of 659.7 per square mile (254.7/km^{2}). The racial makeup of the city was 97.44% White, 0.64% Native American, and 1.92% from two or more races. Hispanic or Latino of any race were 0.64% of the population.

There were 171 households, out of which 16.4% had children under the age of 18 living with them, 40.9% were married couples living together, 5.8% had a female householder with no husband present, and 53.2% were non-families. 48.5% of all households were made up of individuals, and 28.7% had someone living alone who was 65 years of age or older. The average household size was 1.82 and the average family size was 2.60.

In the city, the population was spread out, with 17.3% under the age of 18, 3.2% from 18 to 24, 15.7% from 25 to 44, 29.5% from 45 to 64, and 34.3% who were 65 years of age or older. The median age was 55 years. For every 100 females, there were 88.0 males. For every 100 females age 18 and over, there were 85.6 males.

The median income for a household in the city was $19,643, and the median income for a family was $26,667. Males had a median income of $23,500 versus $13,929 for females. The per capita income for the city was $14,960. About 12.5% of families and 15.9% of the population were below the poverty line, including 11.5% of those under age 18 and 5.7% of those age 65 or over.

== Education ==
The community is served by Eureka USD 389 public school district.

Toronto High School was closed through school unification. The Toronto High School mascot was Trojans.

== Parks and recreation ==
- Toronto Lake and Cross Timbers State Park

== Notable people ==
- John C. Woods, the hangman at the Nuremberg Trials, is buried in the Toronto Township Cemetery.
