= Eureka USD 389 =

Public school district in Eureka, Kansas

Address
- 216 N. Main Street Eureka, Kansas, 67045; United States
- Coordinates: 37.82085°N 96.29380°W

District information
- Type: Public
- Grades: K to 12
- Schools: 2

Other information
- Website: usd389.net

Eureka USD 389 is a public unified school district headquartered in Eureka, Kansas, United States. The district includes the communities of Eureka, Climax, Toronto, Neal, Piedmont, Reece, Tonovay, and nearby rural areas.

== Schools ==
The school district operates the following schools:

- Eureka Jr/Sr High School - 815 N. Jefferson St. in Eureka
- Marshall Elementary School - 1015 N. Jefferson St. in Eureka

== See also ==
- Kansas State Department of Education
- Kansas State High School Activities Association
- List of high schools in Kansas
- List of unified school districts in Kansas
