= Climax, Kansas =

City in Greenwood County, Kansas

- City
- Location within Greenwood County and Kansas

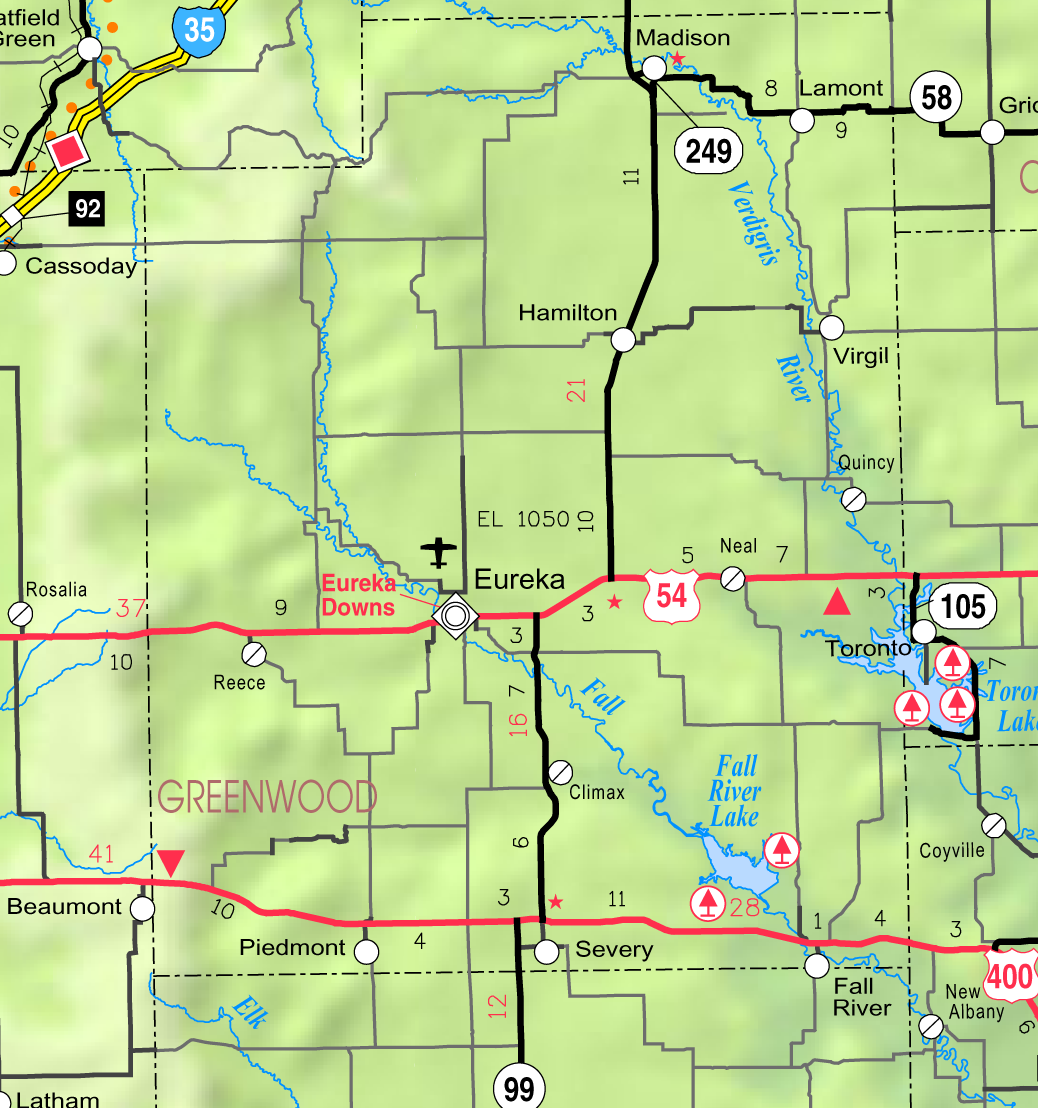
- KDOT map of Greenwood County (legend)
- Coordinates: 37°43′09″N 96°13′27″W
- Country: United States
- State: Kansas
- County: Greenwood
- Founded: 1884
- Incorporated: 1923

Government
  - Type: Mayor–Council

Area
  - Total: 0.12 sq mi (0.31 km^{2})
  - Land: 0.12 sq mi (0.31 km^{2})
  - Water: 0 sq mi (0.00 km^{2})
- Elevation: 1,040 ft (320 m)

Population (2020)
  - Total: 45
  - Density: 380/sq mi (150/km^{2})
- Time zone: UTC-6 (CST)
  - Summer (DST): UTC-5 (CDT)
- ZIP Code: 67137
- Area code: 620
- FIPS code: 20-14275
- GNIS ID: 2393566

Climax is a city in Greenwood County, Kansas, United States. As of the 2020 census, the population of the city was 45.

== History ==
Climax was founded in 1884. It was named from its elevation, or Climax College in Kalamazoo, Michigan.

== Geography ==
According to the United States Census Bureau, the city has a total area of 0.12 square miles (0.31 km^{2}), all land.

== Demographics ==
Historical population
| Census | Pop. | Note | %± |
|---|---|---|---|
| 1930 | 129 | | — |
| 1940 | 157 | | 21.7% |
| 1950 | 91 | | −42.0% |
| 1960 | 81 | | −11.0% |
| 1970 | 64 | | −21.0% |
| 1980 | 81 | | 26.6% |
| 1990 | 57 | | −29.6% |
| 2000 | 64 | | 12.3% |
| 2010 | 72 | | 12.5% |
| 2020 | 45 | | −37.5% |
U.S. Decennial Census

=== 2020 census ===
The 2020 United States census counted 45 people, 21 households, and 16 families in Climax. The population density was 375.0 per square mile (144.8/km^{2}). There were 36 housing units at an average density of 300.0 per square mile (115.8/km^{2}). Of the 45 people living in the city, 43 identified as white or European American, 1 as black or African-American, and 1 as two or more races.

Of the 21 households, 5 had children under the age of 18; 12 were married couples living together; 8 had a female householder with no spouse or partner present. Five households consisted of individuals and 3 had someone living alone who was 65 years of age or older. The average household size was 2.3 and the average family size was 3.1.

Of the 45 people living there, 12 were under the age of 18, none between 18 and 44, 10 were between 45 and 64, and 14 were 65 years of age or older. The median age was 50.5 years. 24 of the population identified as female, and 21 as male. Of the 18-and-older population, 55% were male.

The 2016–2020 5-year American Community Survey estimates show that the median family income was $68,750 (+/- $28,043). The median income for those above 16 years old was $20,833 (+/- $8,786).

=== 2010 census ===
As of the census of 2010, there were 72 people, 28 households, and 23 families residing in the city. The population density was 600.0 inhabitants per square mile (231.7/km^{2}). There were 39 housing units at an average density of 325.0 per square mile (125.5/km^{2}). The racial makeup of the city was 98.6% White and 1.4% from two or more races.

There were 28 households, of which 28.6% had children under the age of 18 living with them, 71.4% were married couples living together, 3.6% had a female householder with no husband present, 7.1% had a male householder with no wife present, and 17.9% were non-families. 14.3% of all households were made up of individuals, and 10.7% had someone living alone who was 65 years of age or older. The average household size was 2.57 and the average family size was 2.87.

The median age in the city was 48.5 years. 25% of residents were under the age of 18; 0.1% were between the ages of 18 and 24; 19.5% were from 25 to 44; 23.6% were from 45 to 64; and 31.9% were 65 years of age or older. The gender makeup of the city was 47.2% male and 52.8% female.

== Education ==
The community is served by Eureka USD 389 public school district.

Climax High School was closed through school unification. The Climax High School mascot was Bulldogs.

== See also ==
- Fall River Lake and Fall River State Park
