= Eureka Township, Greenwood County, Kansas =

Eureka Township
- Township
- Location in Greenwood County
- Coordinates: 37°50′23″N 096°18′21″W
- Country: United States
- State: Kansas
- County: Greenwood

Area
  - Total: 58.53 sq mi (151.59 km^{2})
  - Land: 57.65 sq mi (149.32 km^{2})
  - Water: 0.88 sq mi (2.28 km^{2}) 1.5%
- Elevation: 1,119 ft (341 m)

Population (2020)
  - Total: 355
  - Density: 6.16/sq mi (2.38/km^{2})
- GNIS feature ID: 0474419

Eureka Township is a township in Greenwood County, Kansas, United States. As of the 2020 census its population was 355.

== Geography ==
Eureka Township covers an area of 58.53 square miles (151.6 km^{2}) and contains one incorporated settlement, Eureka (the county seat). According to the USGS, it has a cemetery, Greenwood.

The streams of East Branch Fall River, Kitty Creek, Spring Creek and West Branch Fall River run through this township.

== Transportation ==
Eureka Township contains one airport or landing strip, Eureka Municipal Airport.
