= Virgil, Kansas =

City in Greenwood County, Kansas

- City
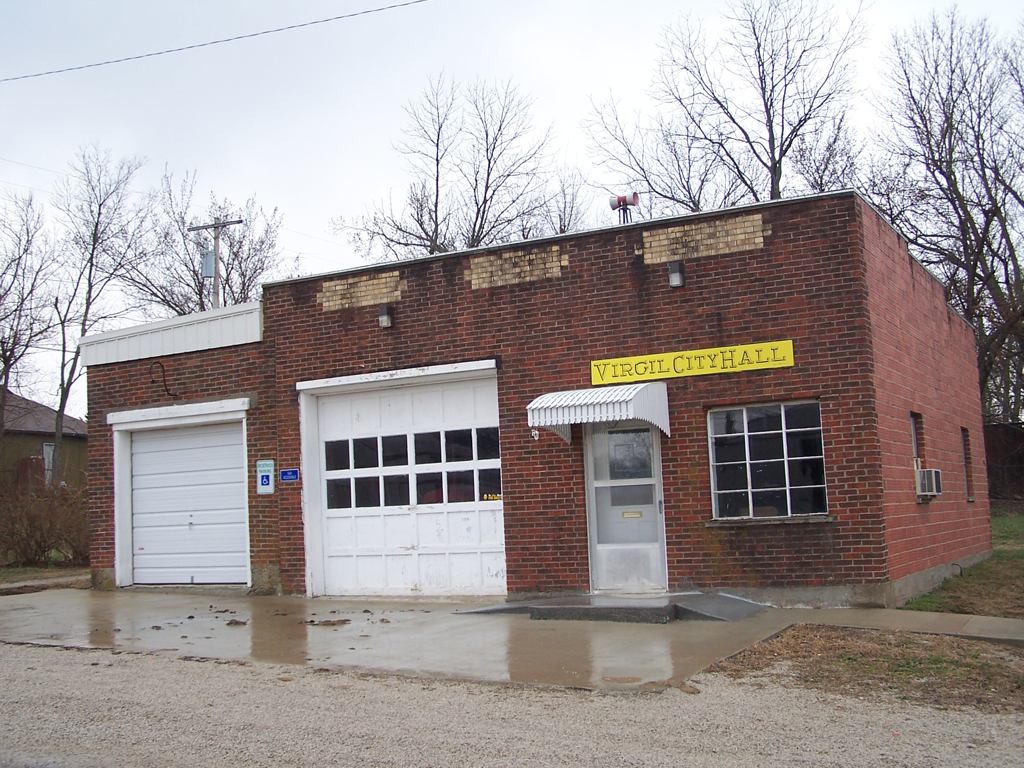
- City Hall (2005)

- Location within Greenwood County and Kansas

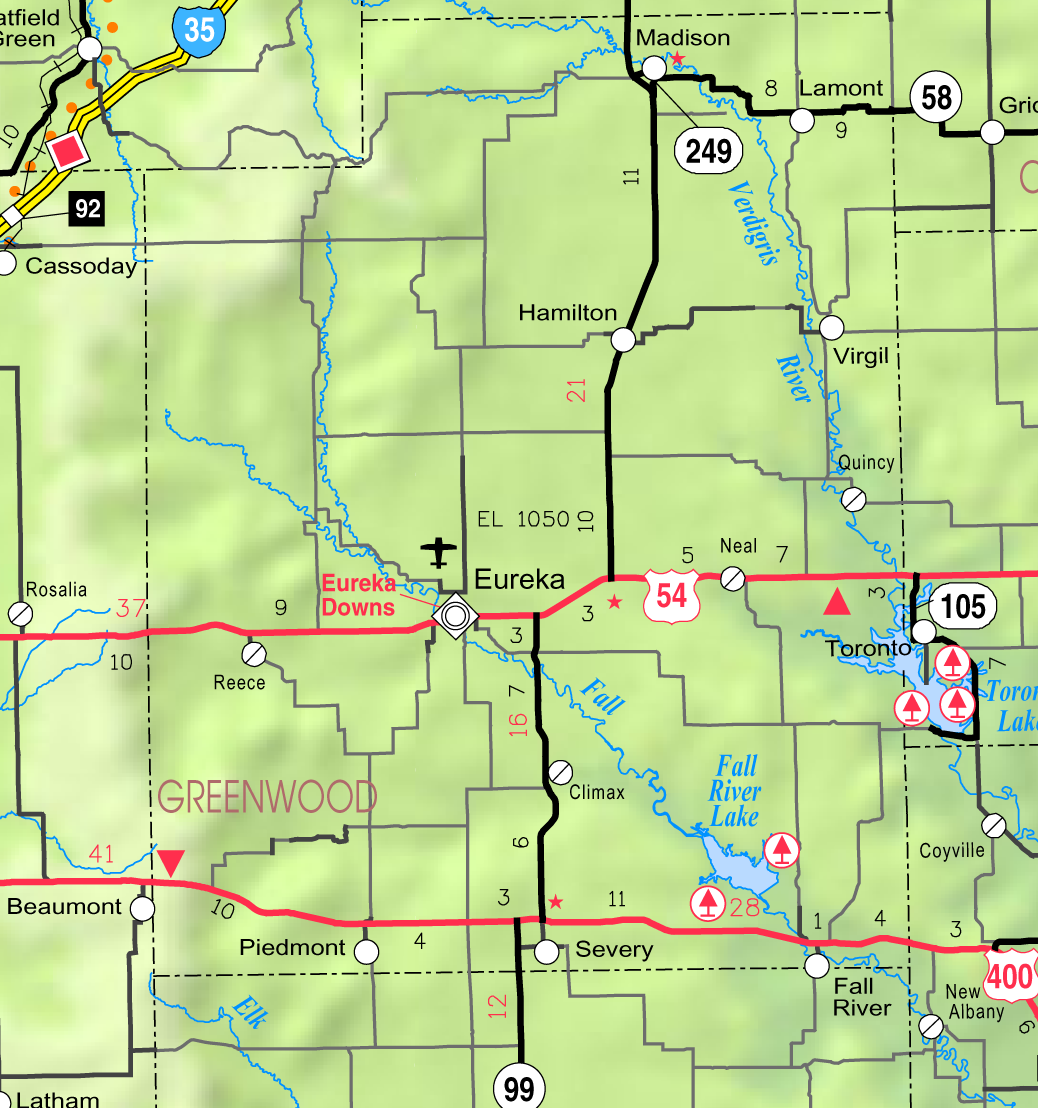
- KDOT map of Greenwood County (legend)
- Coordinates: 37°58′51″N 96°00′42″W
- Country: United States
- State: Kansas
- County: Greenwood
- Incorporated: 1922
- Named for: Virgil, New York

Government
  - Type: Mayor–Council

Area
  - Total: 0.56 sq mi (1.46 km^{2})
  - Land: 0.56 sq mi (1.45 km^{2})
  - Water: 0.0039 sq mi (0.01 km^{2})
- Elevation: 994 ft (303 m)

Population (2020)
  - Total: 48
  - Density: 86/sq mi (33/km^{2})
- Time zone: UTC-6 (CST)
  - Summer (DST): UTC-5 (CDT)
- ZIP Code: 66870
- Area code: 620
- FIPS code: 20-74075
- GNIS ID: 2397151

Virgil is a city in Greenwood County, Kansas, United States. As of the 2020 census, the population of the city was 48. It is located approximately 8 miles east of the city of Hamilton.

== History ==
The first post office in Virgil was established in 1863. The community may be named after Virgil, New York.

== Geography ==
According to the United States Census Bureau, the city has a total area of 0.56 square miles (1.45 km^{2}), all land.

=== Climate ===
The climate in this area is characterized by hot, humid summers and generally mild to cool winters. According to the Köppen Climate Classification system, Virgil has a humid subtropical climate, abbreviated "Cfa" on climate maps.

== Demographics ==
Historical population
Census	Pop.	Note	%±
1880	44		—
1930	598		—
1940	494		−17.4%
1950	354		−28.3%
1960	229		−35.3%
1970	179		−21.8%
1980	169		−5.6%
1990	91		−46.2%
2000	113		24.2%
2010	71		−37.2%
2020	48		−32.4%
U.S. Decennial Census

=== 2010 census ===
As of the census of 2010, there were 71 people, 35 households, and 21 families residing in the city. The population density was 126.8 inhabitants per square mile (49.0/km^{2}). There were 57 housing units at an average density of 101.8 per square mile (39.3/km^{2}). The racial makeup of the city was 95.8% White, 1.4% Native American, and 2.8% from two or more races.

There were 35 households, of which 22.9% had children under the age of 18 living with them, 42.9% were married couples living together, 2.9% had a female householder with no husband present, 14.3% had a male householder with no wife present, and 40.0% were non-families. 34.3% of all households were made up of individuals, and 28.5% had someone living alone who was 65 years of age or older. The average household size was 2.03 and the average family size was 2.57.

The median age in the city was 55.8 years. 15.5% of residents were under the age of 18; 2.7% were between the ages of 18 and 24; 12.7% were from 25 to 44; 28.2% were from 45 to 64; and 40.8% were 65 years of age or older. The gender makeup of the city was 49.3% male and 50.7% female.

=== 2000 census ===
As of the census of 2000, there were 113 people, 44 households, and 28 families residing in the city. The population density was 205.0 inhabitants per square mile (79.2/km^{2}). There were 61 housing units at an average density of 110.6 per square mile (42.7/km^{2}). The racial makeup of the city was 90.27% White, 0.88% Native American, 7.96% from other races, and 0.88% from two or more races. Hispanic or Latino of any race were 7.96% of the population.

There were 44 households, out of which 27.3% had children under the age of 18 living with them, 50.0% were married couples living together, 6.8% had a female householder with no husband present, and 34.1% were non-families. 34.1% of all households were made up of individuals, and 20.5% had someone living alone who was 65 years of age or older. The average household size was 2.57 and the average family size was 3.14.

In the city, the population was spread out, with 35.4% under the age of 18, 5.3% from 18 to 24, 17.7% from 25 to 44, 22.1% from 45 to 64, and 19.5% who were 65 years of age or older. The median age was 36 years. For every 100 females, there were 94.8 males. For every 100 females age 18 and over, there were 87.2 males.

The median income for a household in the city was $23,750, and the median income for a family was $33,125. Males had a median income of $21,250 versus $15,625 for females. The per capita income for the city was $10,604. There were 8.7% of families and 22.8% of the population living below the poverty line, including 45.5% of under eighteens and 7.7% of those over 64.

== Education ==
The community is served by Madison–Virgil USD 386 public school district.
