= Severy, Kansas =

City in Greenwood County, Kansas

- City
- Location within Greenwood County and Kansas

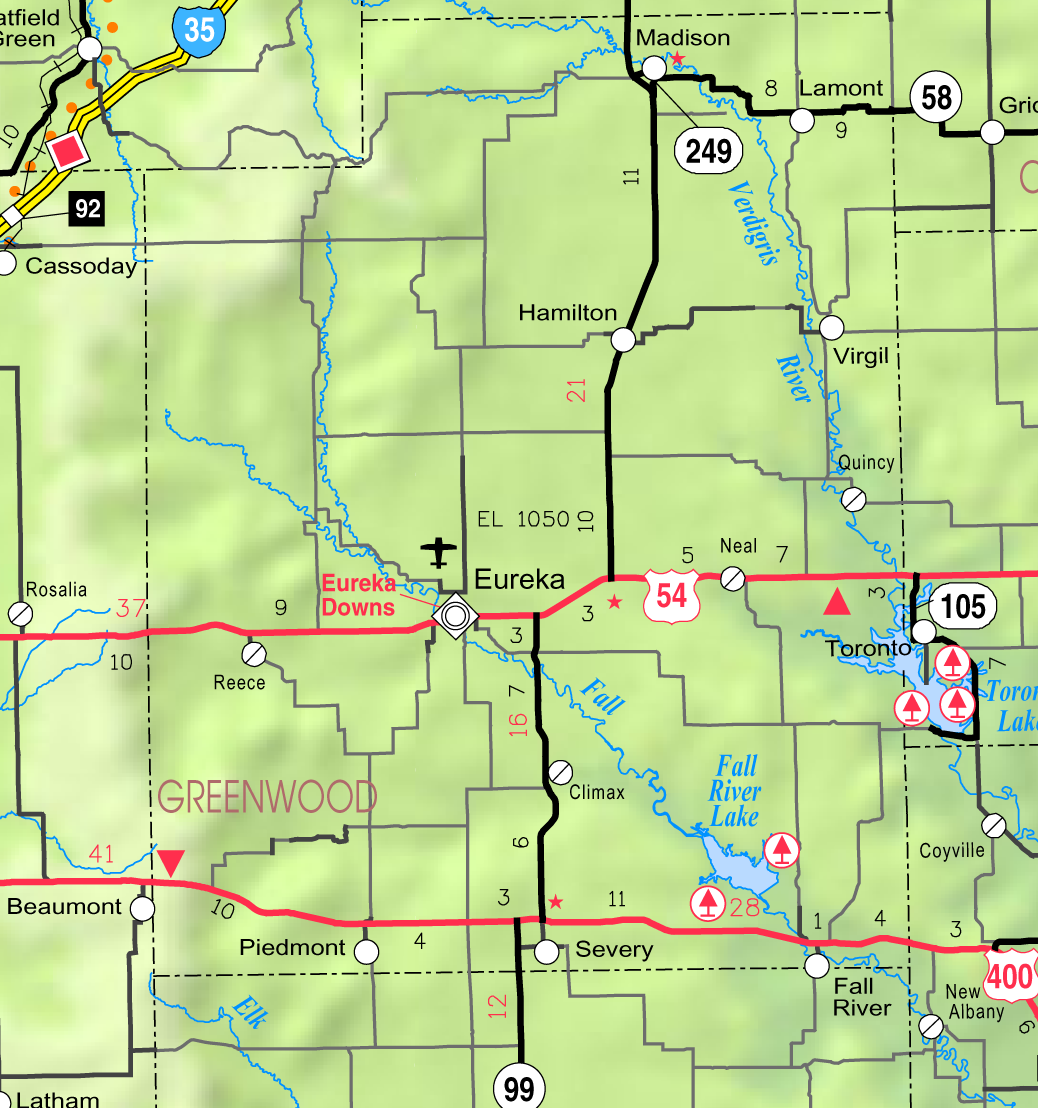
- KDOT map of Greenwood County (legend)
- Coordinates: 37°37′21″N 96°13′39″W
- Country: United States
- State: Kansas
- County: Greenwood
- Founded: 1879
- Incorporated: 1883
- Named for: Luther Severy

Government
  - Type: Mayor–Council

Area
  - Total: 0.49 sq mi (1.27 km^{2})
  - Land: 0.49 sq mi (1.27 km^{2})
  - Water: 0 sq mi (0.00 km^{2})
- Elevation: 1,112 ft (339 m)

Population (2020)
  - Total: 205
  - Density: 418/sq mi (161/km^{2})
- Time zone: UTC-6 (CST)
  - Summer (DST): UTC-5 (CDT)
- ZIP Code: 67137
- Area code: 620
- FIPS code: 20-64050
- GNIS ID: 2396578
- Website: cityofsevery.org

Severy is a city in Greenwood County, Kansas, United States. As of the 2020 census, the population of the city was 205.

== History ==
Severy was originally called Gould, and under the latter name founded in 1879. When the Santa Fe Railway was built through the neighborhood, the name Severy was adopted in honor of Luther Severy, a railroad employee.

== Geography ==
Severy is located along K-99 south of its intersection with U.S. Route 400. According to the United States Census Bureau, the city has a total area of 0.49 square miles (1.27 km^{2}), all land.

=== Climate ===
The climate in this area is characterized by hot, humid summers and generally mild to cool winters. According to the Köppen Climate Classification system, Severy has a humid subtropical climate, abbreviated "Cfa" on climate maps.

== Demographics ==
Historical population
Census	Pop.	Note	%±
1880	306		—
1890	389		27.1%
1900	489		25.7%
1910	608		24.3%
1920	551		−9.4%
1930	525		−4.7%
1940	570		8.6%
1950	477		−16.3%
1960	492		3.1%
1970	384		−22.0%
1980	447		16.4%
1990	357		−20.1%
2000	359		0.6%
2010	259		−27.9%
2020	205		−20.8%
U.S. Decennial Census

=== 2010 census ===
As of the census of 2010, there were 259 people, 132 households, and 62 families residing in the city. The population density was 528.6 inhabitants per square mile (204.1/km^{2}). There were 187 housing units at an average density of 381.6 per square mile (147.3/km^{2}). The racial makeup of the city was 95.8% White, 0.4% African American, 0.8% Native American, 0.4% Asian, and 2.7% from two or more races.

There were 132 households, of which 22.0% had children under the age of 18 living with them, 33.3% were married couples living together, 9.1% had a female householder with no husband present, 4.5% had a male householder with no wife present, and 53.0% were non-families. 47.0% of all households were made up of individuals, and 28.1% had someone living alone who was 65 years of age or older. The average household size was 1.96 and the average family size was 2.85.

The median age in the city was 50.8 years. 21.2% of residents were under the age of 18; 5.5% were between the ages of 18 and 24; 17.7% were from 25 to 44; 29.7% were from 45 to 64; and 25.9% were 65 years of age or older. The gender makeup of the city was 46.3% male and 53.7% female.

=== 2000 census ===
As of the census of 2000, there were 359 people, 152 households, and 89 families residing in the city. The population density was 710.9 inhabitants per square mile (274.5/km^{2}). There were 197 housing units at an average density of 390.1 per square mile (150.6/km^{2}). The racial makeup of the city was 96.38% White, 1.95% Native American, 0.28% from other races, and 1.39% from two or more races. Hispanic or Latino of any race were 0.84% of the population.

There were 152 households, out of which 28.9% had children under the age of 18 living with them, 48.7% were married couples living together, 7.2% had a female householder with no husband present, and 41.4% were non-families. 33.6% of all households were made up of individuals, and 17.8% had someone living alone who was 65 years of age or older. The average household size was 2.36 and the average family size was 3.03.

In the city, the population was spread out, with 27.3% under the age of 18, 6.4% from 18 to 24, 25.6% from 25 to 44, 21.7% from 45 to 64, and 18.9% who were 65 years of age or older. The median age was 39 years. For every 100 females, there were 88.9 males. For every 100 females age 18 and over, there were 86.4 males.

The median income for a household in the city was $23,393, and the median income for a family was $29,583. Males had a median income of $30,208 versus $24,063 for females. The per capita income for the city was $12,623. About 8.1% of families and 12.3% of the population were below the poverty line, including 10.9% of those under age 18 and 3.2% of those age 65 or over.

== Education ==
The community is served by West Elk USD 282 public school district. School unification consolidated Moline, Howard and Severy schools forming USD 282. West Elk High School is located in Howard. The West Elk High School mascot is Patriots.

Severy High School was closed in school unification. The Severy High School mascot was Severy Wildcats.

== Notable people ==
- Stanley Vestal, Western historian and author, including Dodge City, Queen of the Cowtowns, born near Severy in 1887

== See also ==
- Fall River Lake and Fall River State Park
