= Verdigris River =

Tributary of the Arkansas River in Kansas and Oklahoma, USA

Verdigris River Van Horner Creek, Vermillion River, Wasetihoge River
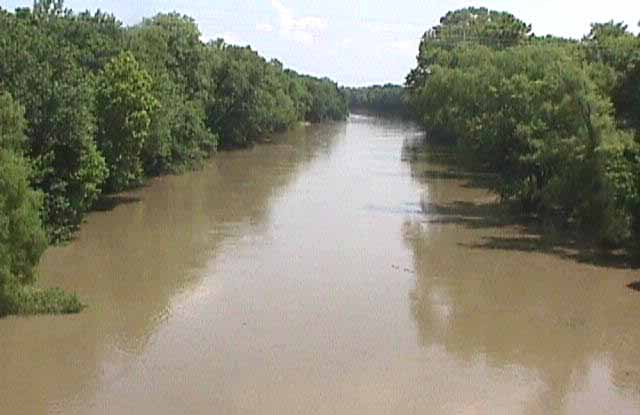
- The Verdigris River near Lenapah, Oklahoma

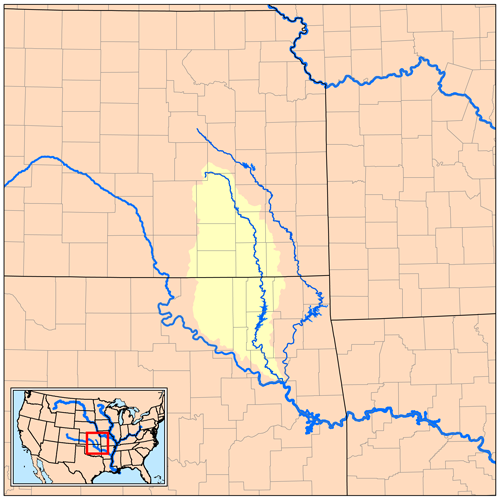
- Map of the Verdigris watershed
- Native name: Wvsase Hvcce (Creek); ᏩᏌᏏ ᎡᏉᏂ ᏄᏪᏴ (Wasasi Equoni Nuweyv) (Cherokee)

Location
- Country: United States
- State: Kansas, Oklahoma

Physical characteristics
- Source confluence
  - location: Madison, Kansas
  - coordinates: 38°09′08″N 96°10′01″W
  - elevation: 1,090 ft (330 m)
- Mouth: Arkansas River
  - location: Muskogee, Oklahoma
  - coordinates: 35°48′01″N 95°18′28″W
  - elevation: 489 ft (149 m)
- Length: 310 mi (500 km)
- Discharge
  - location: USGS 07176000 near Claremore, OK
  - average: 4,644 cu ft/s (131.5 m^{3}/s)
  - minimum: 3.4 cu ft/s (0.096 m^{3}/s)
  - maximum: 77,700 cu ft/s (2,200 m^{3}/s)

Basin features
- Progression: Verdigris-Arkansas-Mississippi
- Tributaries
  - right: Fall River, Elk River, Caney River
- Waterbodies: Toronto Lake, Oologah Lake

The Verdigris River /ˈvɜːrdɪɡrɪs/ is a tributary of the Arkansas River in southeastern Kansas and northeastern Oklahoma in the United States. It is about 310 miles (500 km) long. Via the Arkansas, it is part of the Mississippi River watershed.

== Course ==
The Verdigris is formed near Madison, Kansas, by the convergence of two short headwaters streams, its North and South forks, and flows generally southward throughout its course. South of Coffeyville, Kansas, the river enters Oklahoma. It joins the Arkansas River near Muskogee, Oklahoma, about a mile upstream of the mouth of the Neosho River. The area of convergence of the three rivers Arkansas, Verdigris and Neosho is called "Three Forks".

== History ==
The river is mentioned in accounts by Zebulon Pike (1806) and Thomas Nuttall (1818). Fur traders had numerous posts along its route where they met with Native Americans to exchange goods for furs. The river is also mentioned in the novel Little House on the Prairie (1935) by Laura Ingalls Wilder, of her memories when her family moved to Kansas from Wisconsin.

According to the Encyclopædia Britannica, the name may be derived from a greenish substance also called verdigris, resembling a copper ore, which tinged the water. In the U.S. treaty of 1834 with the Cherokee Indians, the river was named as a part of the boundary of their lands in the Indian Territory.

In 1994, Tom Paxton wrote and recorded a song: "Along the Verdigris", celebrating its rural tranquillity, on his album Wearing The Time.

In July 2007, Coffeyville Resources suffered flooding at its refinery at Coffeyville by the Verdigris River, causing a spill of about 1,700 barrels of crude oil. The company made efforts to ameliorate the damage.

On May 25, 2019, Rogers County sent out a civil authority message to all radios in Washington County, Tulsa County, and other counties about the river rising rapidly.

== Dams and transportation ==
Several dams built by the U.S. Army Corps of Engineers cause the Verdigris to form Toronto Lake near Toronto, Kansas and Oologah Lake near Oologah, Oklahoma. More dams and reservoirs are downstream along the Arkansas River.

From just north of Catoosa, Oklahoma to the river's confluence with the Arkansas, barge traffic is supported on the river via the McClellan-Kerr Navigation System. This consists of a series of locks and dams on the Arkansas and the Verdigris rivers; this system enables commercial navigation between the Tulsa, Oklahoma, area and the Mississippi River, and thence to the Gulf of Mexico.

== Tributaries ==
In Kansas, the Verdigris collects the Fall River at the town of Neodesha and the Elk River at the town of Independence. In Oklahoma it collects the Caney River in Rogers County.

== Cities and towns along the river ==
- Altoona, Kansas
- Benedict, Kansas
- Catoosa, Oklahoma
- Coffeyville, Kansas
- Independence, Kansas
- Madison, Kansas
- Neodesha, Kansas
- Okay, Oklahoma
- Oologah, Oklahoma
- Talala, Oklahoma
- Toronto, Kansas
- Nowata, Oklahoma
- Virgil, Kansas
- Verdigris, Oklahoma

== Gallery ==
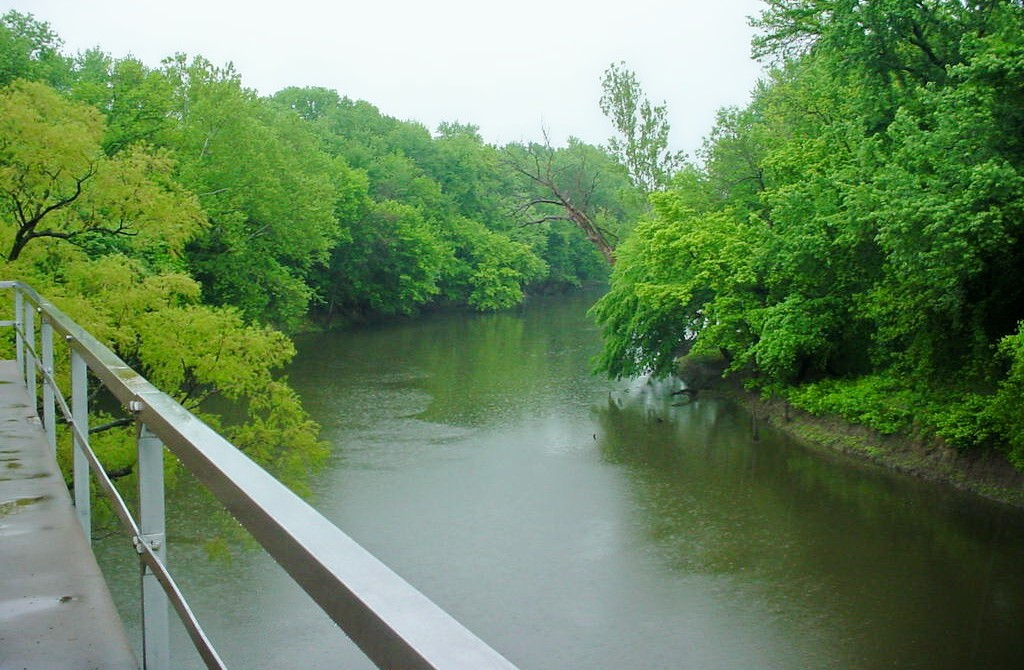
The Verdigris River at Coffeyville, Kansas

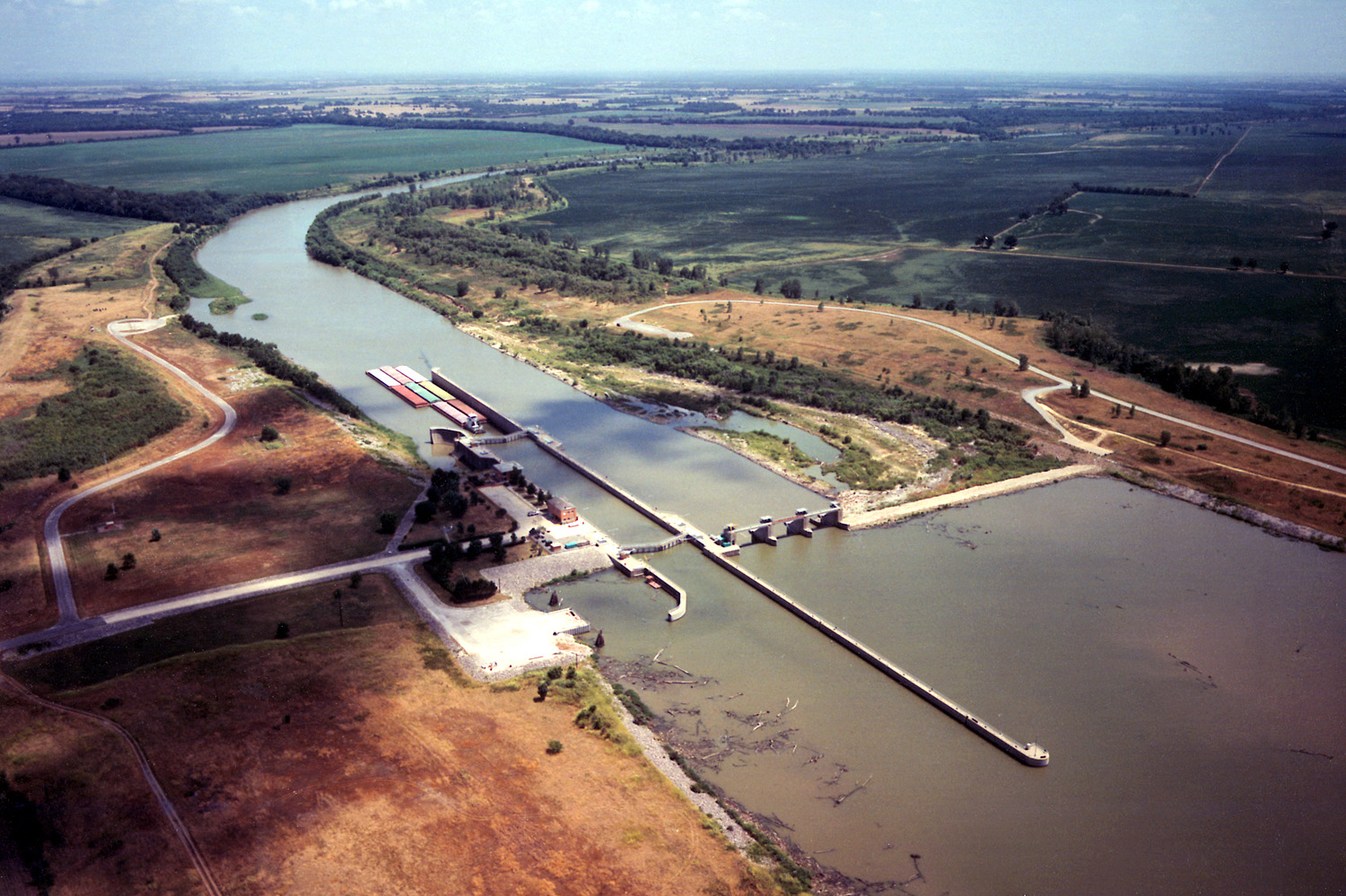
Newt Graham Lock and Dam on the Verdigris River in Wagoner County, Oklahoma

== See also ==
- List of Kansas rivers
- List of Oklahoma rivers
- Port of Catoosa
- Nowata
