= Fall River State Park =

State park in Kansas, United States

- Location within Kansas Location within the United States
- Interactive map of Fall River State Park
- Location: Greenwood County, Kansas, United States
- Coordinates: 37°39′18″N 96°05′36″W
- Area: 1,107 acres (448 ha)
- Elevation: 955 ft (291 m)
- Established: 1960
- Administrator: Kansas Department of Wildlife and Parks
- Visitors: 71,965 (in 2022)
- Website: Official website
- Kansas State Parks

Fall River State Park is an 1,107-acre (448 ha) public recreation area in Greenwood County, Kansas, United States, southwest of the city of Toronto. Located near the Flint Hills, the state park features six different hiking trails: Casner Creek, Turkey Run, Post Oak, Overlook, Bluestem, and Catclaw. Other activities include camping, picnicking, swimming, boating and waterskiing on the 2,450-acre (990 ha) Fall River Lake for which the state park is named.

== See also ==
- List of lakes, reservoirs, and dams in Kansas
- List of rivers of Kansas
