= Greenwood County, Kansas =

County in Kansas, United States

- County
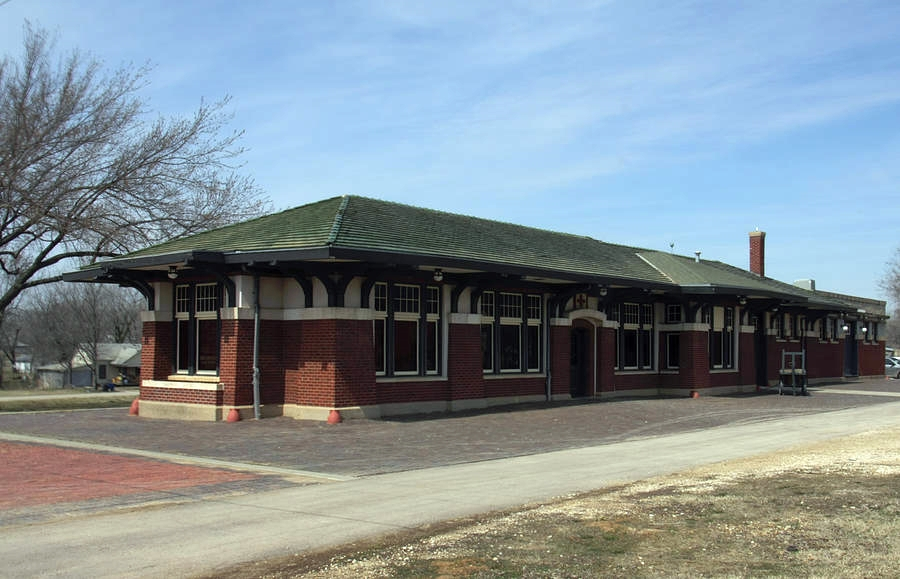
- AT&SF Railroad Depot in Eureka (2013)

- Location within the U.S. state of Kansas
- Coordinates: 37°52′00″N 96°16′00″W
- Country: United States
- State: Kansas
- Founded: August 25, 1855
- Named for: Alfred B. Greenwood
- Seat: Eureka
- Largest city: Eureka

Area
  - Total: 1,153 sq mi (2,990 km^{2})
  - Land: 1,143 sq mi (2,960 km^{2})
  - Water: 9.3 sq mi (24 km^{2}) 0.8%

Population (2020)
  - Total: 6,016
  - Estimate (2025): 5,826 ▼
  - Density: 5.3/sq mi (2.0/km^{2})
- Time zone: UTC−6 (Central)
  - Summer (DST): UTC−5 (CDT)
- Congressional district: 4th
- Website: GreenwoodCounty.org

Greenwood County is a county located in the southeast portion of the U.S. state of Kansas. Its county seat and most populous city is Eureka. As of the 2020 census, the county population was 6,016. The county was named for Alfred Greenwood, a U.S. congressman from Arkansas that advocated Kansas statehood.

== History ==
=== Early history ===
For many millennia, the Great Plains of North America was inhabited by nomadic Native Americans. From the 16th century to 18th century, the Kingdom of France claimed ownership of large parts of North America. In 1762, after the French and Indian War, France secretly ceded New France to Spain, per the Treaty of Fontainebleau.

=== 19th century ===
In 1802, Spain returned most of the land to France, but keeping title to about 7,500 square miles. In 1803, most of the land for modern day Kansas was acquired by the United States from France as part of the 828,000 square mile Louisiana Purchase for 2.83 cents per acre.

In 1854, the Kansas Territory was organized, then in 1861 Kansas became the 34th U.S. state. In 1855, Greenwood County was established, and named for Alfred B. Greenwood, a U.S. Congressman from Arkansas.

Greenwood City was established in 1871, on the Verdigris River, near the heart of the county. It was a rowdy frontier town, largely populated by outlaws, including some notorious. However, when the railroad was routed through nearby Toronto, to the south, Greenwood City died out.

The first railroad in Greenwood County was built through that territory in 1879.

== Geography ==
According to the U.S. Census Bureau, the county has a total area of 1,153 square miles (2,990 km^{2}), of which 1,143 square miles (2,960 km^{2}) is land and 9.3 square miles (24 km^{2}) (0.8%) is water. It is the fifth-largest county in Kansas by area.

=== Adjacent counties ===
- Lyon County (north)
- Coffey County (northeast)
- Woodson County (east)
- Wilson County (southeast)
- Elk County (south)
- Butler County (west)
- Chase County (northwest)

== Demographics ==
Historical population
Census	Pop.	Note	%±
1860	769		—
1870	3,484		353.1%
1880	10,548		202.8%
1890	16,309		54.6%
1900	16,196		−0.7%
1910	16,060		−0.8%
1920	14,715		−8.4%
1930	19,235		30.7%
1940	16,495		−14.2%
1950	13,574		−17.7%
1960	11,253		−17.1%
1970	9,141		−18.8%
1980	8,764		−4.1%
1990	7,847		−10.5%
2000	7,673		−2.2%
2010	6,689		−12.8%
2020	6,016		−10.1%
2025 (est.)	5,826	▼	−3.2%
U.S. Decennial Census; 1790-1960 1900-1990; 1990-2000 2010-2020

=== Racial and ethnic composition ===
Greenwood County, Kansas – Racial and ethnic composition Note: the U.S. Census treats Hispanic/Latino as an ethnic category. This table excludes Latinos from the racial categories and assigns them to a separate category. Hispanics/Latinos may be of any race.
Race / Ethnicity (NH = Non-Hispanic)	Pop 1980	Pop 1990	Pop 2000	Pop 2010	Pop 2020	% 1980	% 1990	% 2000	% 2010	% 2020
White alone (NH)	8,632	7,673	7,352	6,257	5,406	98.49%	97.78%	95.82%	93.54%	89.86%
Black or African American alone (NH)	0	9	11	23	28	0.00%	0.11%	0.14%	0.34%	0.47%
Native American or Alaska Native alone (NH)	51	74	59	61	32	0.58%	0.94%	0.77%	0.91%	0.53%
Asian alone (NH)	5	0	8	18	36	0.06%	0.00%	0.10%	0.27%	0.60%
Native Hawaiian or Pacific Islander alone (NH)	x	x	0	0	1	x	x	0.00%	0.00%	0.02%
Other race alone (NH)	5	0	2	1	15	0.06%	0.00%	0.03%	0.01%	0.25%
Mixed race or Multiracial (NH)	x	x	109	109	294	x	x	1.42%	1.63%	4.89%
Hispanic or Latino (any race)	71	91	132	220	204	0.81%	1.16%	1.72%	3.29%	3.39%
Total	8,764	7,847	7,673	6,689	6,016	100.00%	100.00%	100.00%	100.00%	100.00%

=== 2020 census ===
As of the 2020 census, the county had a population of 6,016 and a median age of 48.7 years; 21.4% of residents were under the age of 18 and 26.2% of residents were 65 years of age or older. For every 100 females there were 100.3 males, and for every 100 females age 18 and over there were 98.0 males age 18 and over. 0.0% of residents lived in urban areas, while 100.0% lived in rural areas.

The racial makeup of the county was 91.3% White, 0.5% Black or African American, 0.6% American Indian and Alaska Native, 0.6% Asian, 0.0% Native Hawaiian and Pacific Islander, 0.9% from some other race, and 6.2% from two or more races. Hispanic or Latino residents of any race comprised 3.4% of the population.

There were 2,687 households in the county, of which 24.0% had children under the age of 18 living with them and 24.0% had a female householder with no spouse or partner present. About 34.0% of all households were made up of individuals and 17.1% had someone living alone who was 65 years of age or older.

There were 3,666 housing units, of which 26.7% were vacant. Among occupied housing units, 75.3% were owner-occupied and 24.7% were renter-occupied. The homeowner vacancy rate was 2.3% and the rental vacancy rate was 10.7%.

=== 2000 census ===
As of the 2000 census, there were 7,673 people, 3,234 households, and 2,153 families residing in the county. The population density was 7 people per square mile (2.7 people/km^{2}). There were 4,273 housing units at an average density of 4 per square mile (1.5/km^{2}). The racial makeup of the county was 96.53% White, 0.83% Native American, 0.14% Black or African American, 0.10% Asian, 0.81% from other races, and 1.58% from two or more races. Hispanic or Latino of any race were 1.72% of the population.

There were 3,234 households, out of which 27.10% had children under the age of 18 living with them, 56.50% were married couples living together, 6.60% had a female householder with no husband present, and 33.40% were non-families. 30.30% of all households were made up of individuals, and 16.80% had someone living alone who was 65 years of age or older. The average household size was 2.31 and the average family size was 2.86.

In the county, the population was spread out, with 23.70% under the age of 18, 6.50% from 18 to 24, 23.20% from 25 to 44, 23.70% from 45 to 64, and 22.80% who were 65 years of age or older. The median age was 43 years. For every 100 females there were 95.50 males. For every 100 females age 18 and over, there were 91.50 males.

The median income for a household in the county was $30,169, and the median income for a family was $38,140. Males had a median income of $27,021 versus $19,356 for females. The per capita income for the county was $15,976. About 8.20% of families and 12.50% of the population were below the poverty line, including 16.20% of those under age 18 and 10.10% of those age 65 or over.

== Government ==
Greenwood county is often carried by Republican Candidates. The last time a Democratic candidate has carried this county was in 1936 by Franklin D. Roosevelt.

=== Presidential elections ===
Presidential election results

United States presidential election results for Greenwood County, Kansas
Year	Republican		Democratic		Third party(ies)	
Year	No.	%	No.	%	No.	%
1888	2,242	56.89%	1,110	28.17%	589	14.95%
1892	1,734	49.01%	0	0.00%	1,804	50.99%
1896	1,835	46.79%	2,064	52.63%	23	0.59%
1900	2,204	53.28%	1,917	46.34%	16	0.39%
1904	2,458	63.70%	1,211	31.38%	190	4.92%
1908	2,370	59.16%	1,545	38.57%	91	2.27%
1912	954	25.83%	1,334	36.11%	1,406	38.06%
1916	2,971	48.28%	2,956	48.03%	227	3.69%
1920	3,422	68.34%	1,478	29.52%	107	2.14%
1924	4,181	64.02%	1,794	27.47%	556	8.51%
1928	5,863	78.53%	1,554	20.81%	49	0.66%
1932	3,592	46.37%	4,002	51.66%	153	1.97%
1936	4,146	49.68%	4,176	50.04%	23	0.28%
1940	4,893	60.34%	3,160	38.97%	56	0.69%
1944	3,959	63.99%	2,187	35.35%	41	0.66%
1948	3,553	57.31%	2,574	41.52%	73	1.18%
1952	4,974	73.70%	1,743	25.83%	32	0.47%
1956	4,164	70.01%	1,763	29.64%	21	0.35%
1960	3,758	67.46%	1,804	32.38%	9	0.16%
1964	2,717	56.59%	2,048	42.66%	36	0.75%
1968	2,937	65.99%	1,122	25.21%	392	8.81%
1972	3,157	74.49%	951	22.44%	130	3.07%
1976	2,319	55.96%	1,737	41.92%	88	2.12%
1980	2,685	64.62%	1,241	29.87%	229	5.51%
1984	2,901	70.45%	1,173	28.48%	44	1.07%
1988	2,217	59.66%	1,421	38.24%	78	2.10%
1992	1,411	36.62%	1,262	32.75%	1,180	30.63%
1996	1,932	53.15%	1,108	30.48%	595	16.37%
2000	2,392	67.17%	1,027	28.84%	142	3.99%
2004	2,282	70.35%	911	28.08%	51	1.57%
2008	1,619	71.04%	622	27.29%	38	1.67%
2012	1,590	74.89%	478	22.52%	55	2.59%
2016	2,160	76.06%	485	17.08%	195	6.87%
2020	2,444	79.43%	569	18.49%	64	2.08%
2024	2,299	79.72%	541	18.76%	44	1.53%

=== Laws ===
Greenwood County was a prohibition, or "dry", county until the Kansas Constitution was amended in 1986 and voters approved the sale of alcoholic liquor by the individual drink with a 30% food sales requirement.

== Education ==
=== Unified school districts ===
School districts which have territory in the county include:

- Madison–Virgil USD 386
- Eureka USD 389
- Hamilton USD 390

School districts with offices in neighboring counties

- West Elk USD 282 (serving Severy and southern Greenwood county)
- Fredonia USD 484 (serving Fall River and southeastern corner of Greenwood county)
- Bluestem USD 205
- Flinthills USD 492
- Leroy-Gridley USD 245

== Communities ==
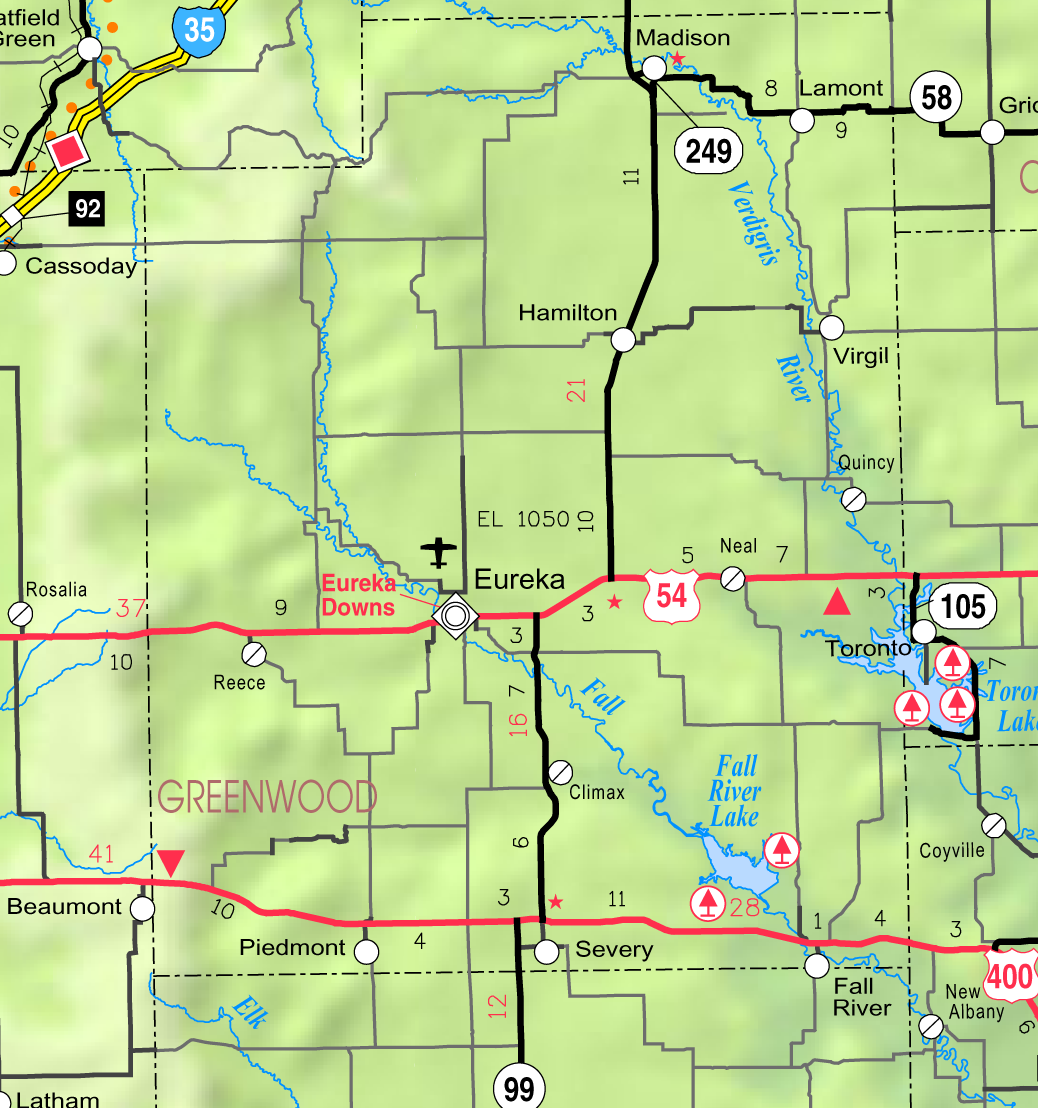
2005 map of Greenwood County (map legend)

List of townships / incorporated cities / unincorporated communities / extinct former communities within Greenwood County.

=== Cities ===
- Climax
- Eureka (county seat)
- Fall River
- Hamilton
- Madison
- Severy
- Virgil

=== Unincorporated communities ===
† means a community is designated a Census-Designated Place (CDP) by the United States Census Bureau.

- Lamont
- Neal†
- Piedmont†
- Quincy
- Reece
- Tonovay

=== Ghost towns ===
- Ivanpah
- Lapland
- Teterville
- Thrall
- Utopia

=== Townships ===
Greenwood County is divided into fifteen townships. The city of Eureka is considered governmentally independent and is excluded from the census figures for the townships. In the following table, the population center is the largest city (or cities) included in that township's population total, if it is of a significant size.

Township	FIPS	Population center	Population	Population density /km^{2} (/sq mi)	Land area km^{2} (sq mi)	Water area km^{2} (sq mi)	Water %	Geographic coordinates
Bachelor	03625		230	1 (4)	155 (60)	1 (0)	0.70%	37°49′57″N 96°12′21″W
Eureka	21825		451	3 (8)	149 (58)	2 (1)	1.50%	37°50′41″N 96°17′49″W
Fall River	22800		229	1 (4)	154 (60)	2 (1)	1.13%	37°42′36″N 96°12′4″W
Janesville	35000		548	1 (4)	371 (143)	2 (1)	0.62%	37°59′4″N 96°11′29″W
Lane	38425		167	1 (3)	138 (53)	1 (0)	0.52%	37°58′36″N 96°0′59″W
Madison	44075		1,155	4 (9)	320 (124)	3 (1)	0.85%	38°7′32″N 96°12′11″W
Otter Creek	53650		211	1 (2)	290 (112)	2 (1)	0.55%	37°40′20″N 96°24′0″W
Pleasant Grove	56375		52	0 (1)	150 (58)	2 (1)	1.57%	37°47′21″N 96°1′41″W
Quincy	58175		163	1 (3)	155 (60)	1 (0)	0.38%	37°51′8″N 96°2′59″W
Salem	62650		35	0 (0)	233 (90)	2 (1)	0.89%	38°1′45″N 96°24′29″W
Salt Springs	62875		463	3 (7)	182 (70)	10 (4)	5.16%	37°38′55″N 96°3′59″W
Shell Rock	64600		173	1 (3)	136 (53)	1 (0)	0.87%	38°5′53″N 96°1′18″W
South Salem	66925		127	1 (1)	224 (87)	3 (1)	1.13%	37°52′42″N 96°27′4″W
Spring Creek	67425		154	1 (3)	139 (54)	1 (1)	0.93%	37°47′49″N 96°26′50″W
Twin Grove	71825		601	4 (11)	148 (57)	1 (0)	0.57%	37°38′7″N 96°14′3″W
Sources: "Census 2000 U.S. Gazetteer Files". U.S. Census Bureau, Geography Division. Archived from the original on August 2, 2002.

== See also ==
- National Register of Historic Places listings in Greenwood County, Kansas

Community information for Kansas

- Kansas locations by per capita income
- List of counties in Kansas
- List of townships in Kansas
- List of cities in Kansas
- List of unincorporated communities in Kansas
- List of ghost towns in Kansas
