= List of lakes, reservoirs, and dams in Kansas =

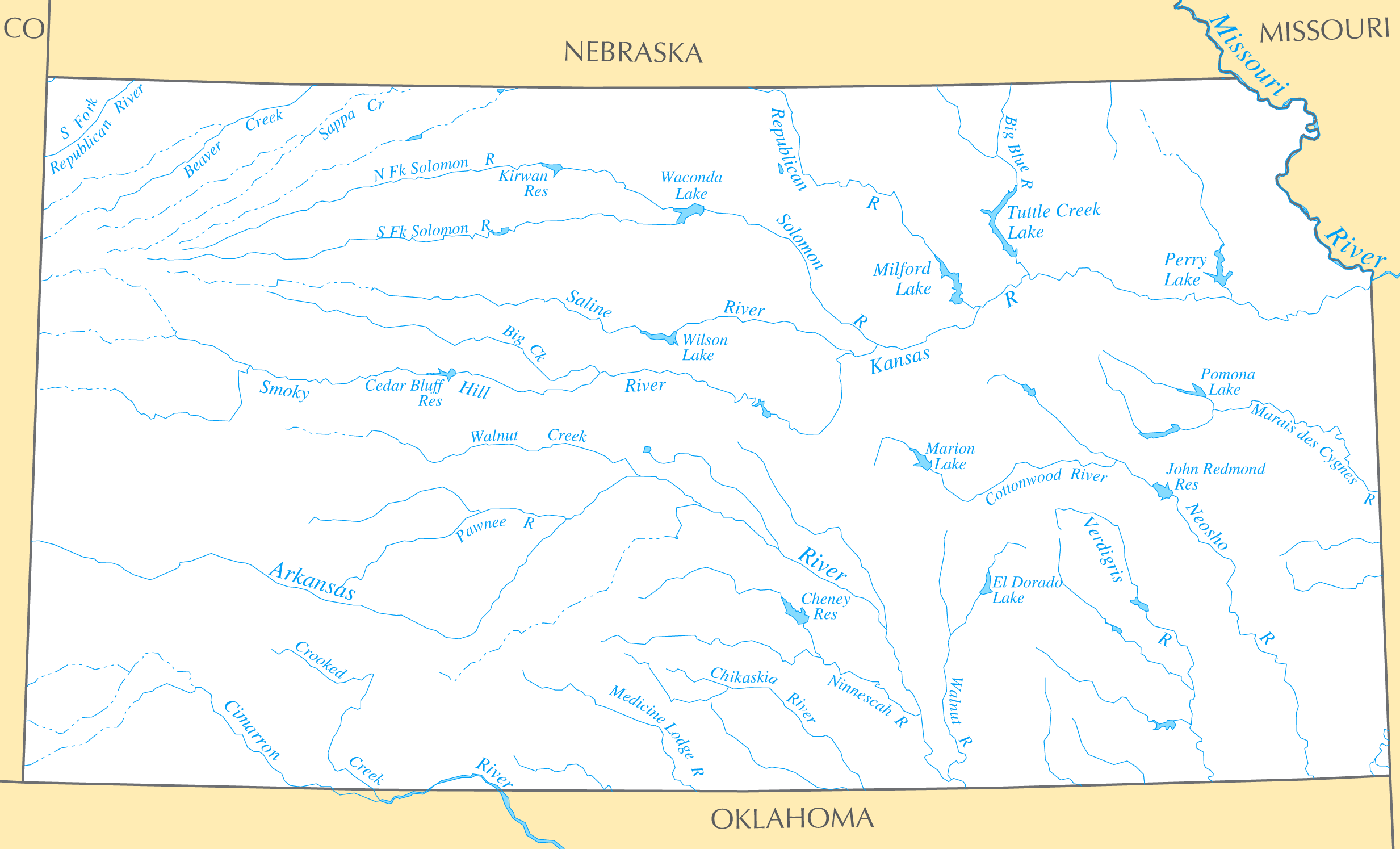
Lakes and rivers in Kansas

This is a listing of lakes, reservoirs, and dams located in the state of Kansas. Swimming, fishing, and/or boating are permitted in some of these lakes, but not all.

== Lakes and reservoirs by size ==
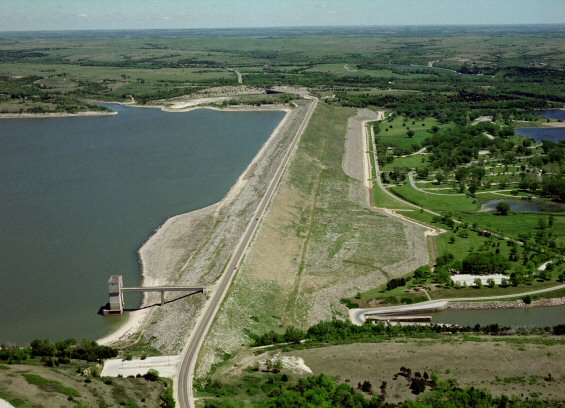
Tuttle Creek Dam and Lake

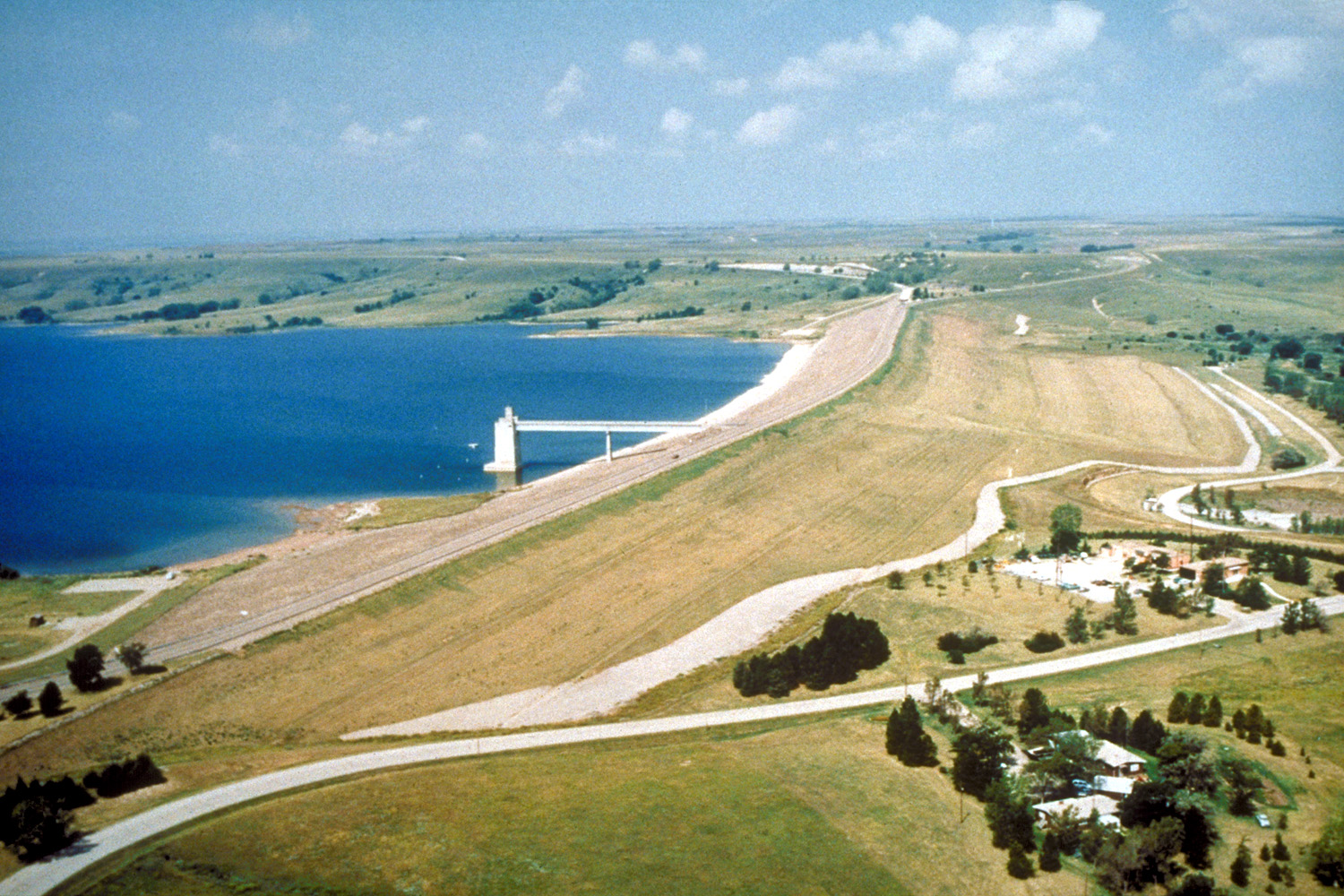
Wilson Dam and Lake

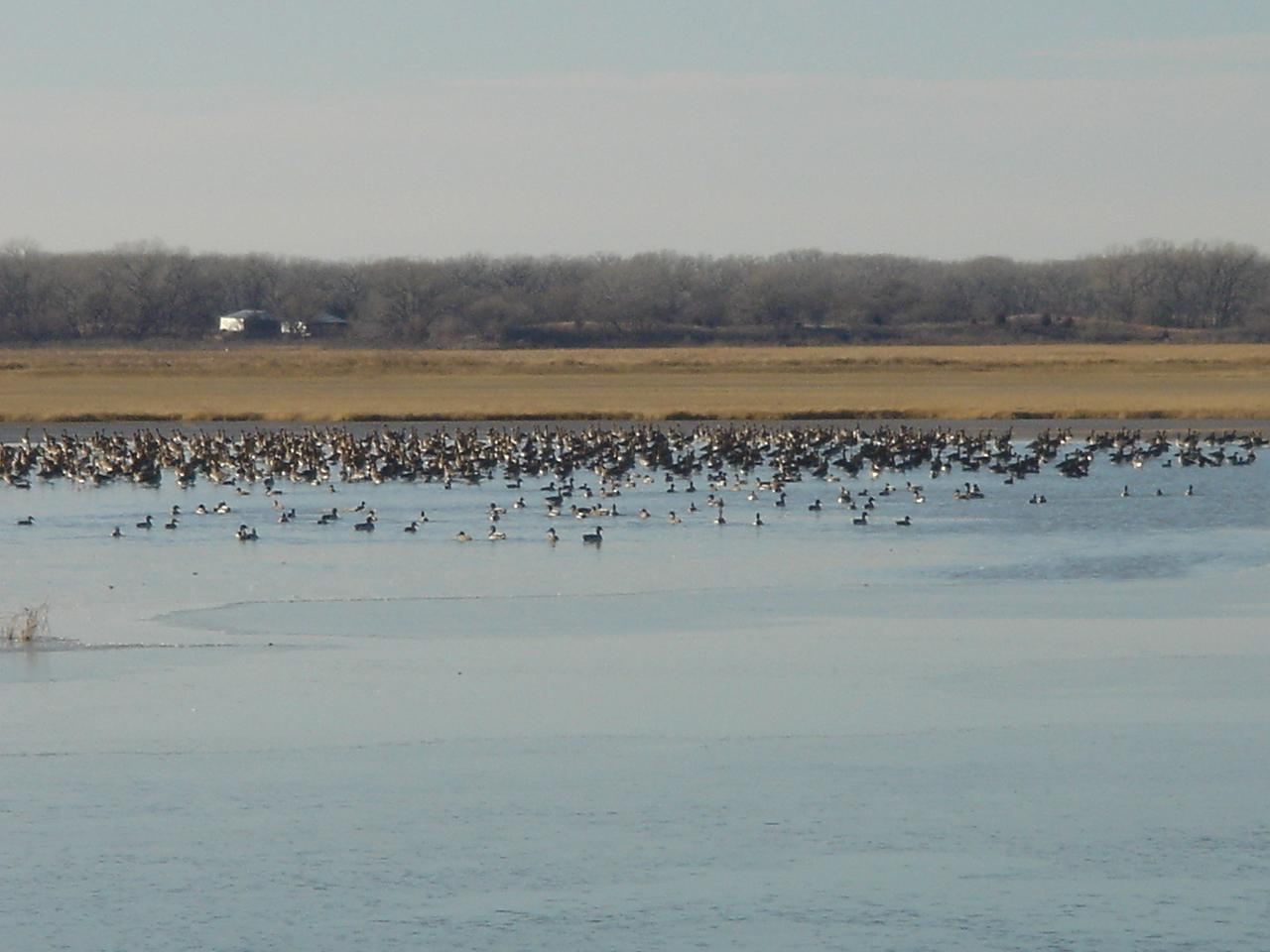
Birds on one of Quivira National Wildlife Refuge's salt marshes.

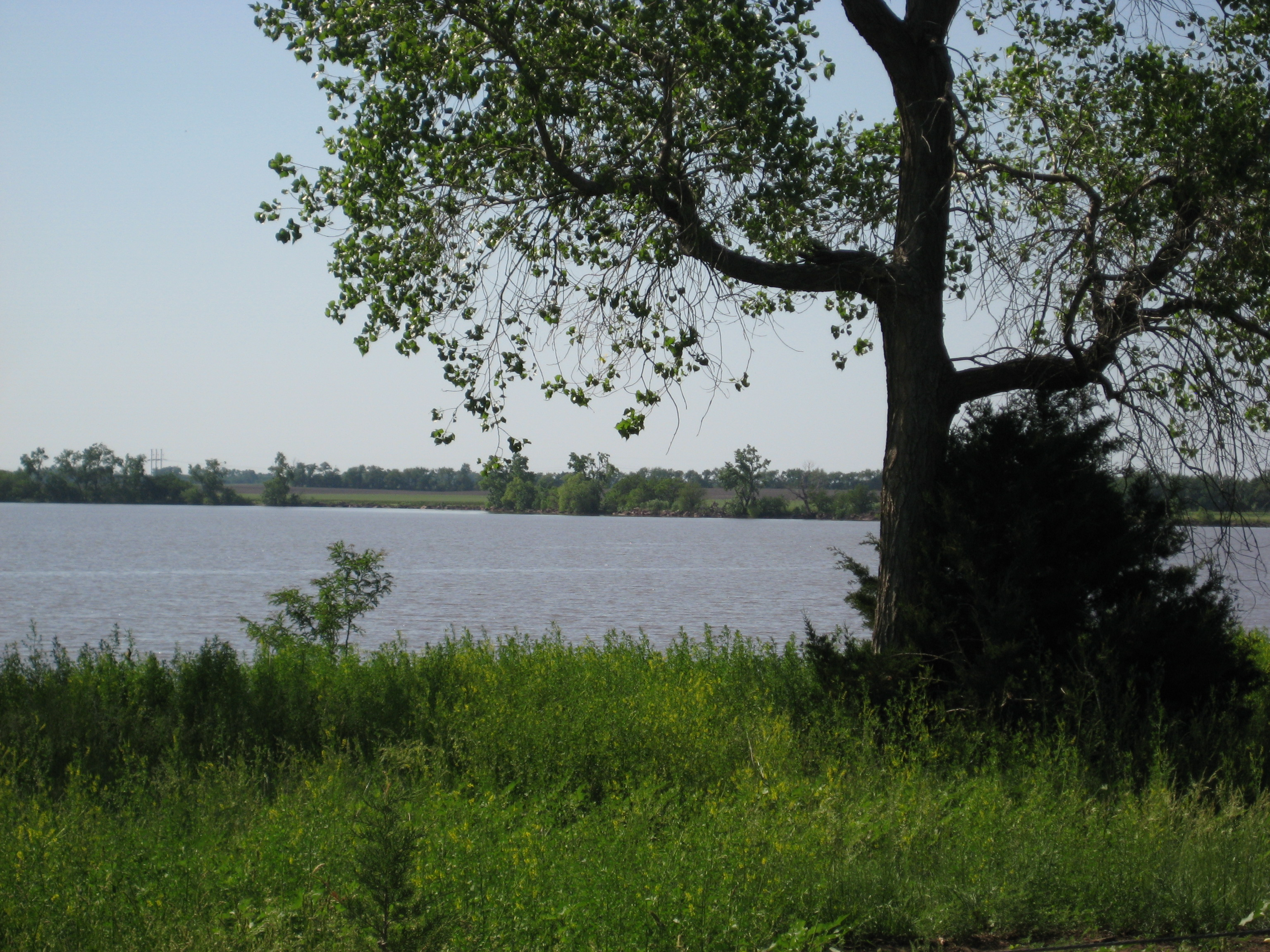
Lake Inman is the largest natural lake in Kansas.

The shorelines of Kansas Lakes are mostly in government ownership and open to the public for hunting, fishing, camping, and hiking. Large areas of public land surround most of the lakes.

Name	Capacity in acre feet (normal pool)	surface acres (normal pool)	maximum depth	comments
Milford Lake	351,577	15,709 acres (6,357 ha)	65 feet (20 m)	21,000 acres (8,500 ha) of recreational land
Tuttle Creek Lake	253,265	12,500 acres (5,059 ha)	50 feet (15 m)	16,000 acres (6,500 ha) of recreational land
Waconda Lake (Glen Elder Dam)	241,460	12,586 acres (5,093 ha)	45 feet (14 m)	13,000 acres (5,300 ha) of recreational land
Wilson Lake	235,000	9,020 acres (3,650 ha)	65 feet (20 m)	8,120 acres (3,290 ha) of recreational land, clearest lake in Kansas
Perry Lake	209,513	11,150 acres (4,512 ha)	55 feet (17 m)	21,600 acres (8,700 ha) of recreational land
Cheney Reservoir	168,000	9,537 acres (3,859 ha)	49 feet (15 m)	7,412 acres (3,000 ha) of recreational land
El Dorado Lake	153,444	8,000 acres (3,237 ha)	51 feet (16 m)	8,000 acres (3,200 ha) of recreational land, Trout fishing below dam in winter
Melvern Lake	151,256	6,930 acres (2,804 ha)	60 feet (18 m)	17,244 acres (6,978 ha) of recreational land
Clinton Lake	110,400	7,000 acres (2,833 ha)	55 feet (17 m)	11,000 acres (4,500 ha) of recreational land
Marion Reservoir	80,669	6,200 acres (2,509 ha)	37 feet (11 m)	6,000 acres (2,400 ha) of recreational land
Cedar Bluff Reservoir	79,252	6,869 acres (2,780 ha)	55 feet (17 m)	5,668 acres (2,294 ha) of recreational land
Hillsdale Lake	76,300	4,575 acres (1,851 ha)	57 feet (17 m)	8,000 acres (3,200 ha) of recreational land
Pomona Lake	70,600	4,060 acres (1,643 ha)	50 feet (15 m)	10,500 acres (4,200 ha) of recreational land
Kirwin Reservoir	67,268	5,079 acres (2,055 ha)	49 feet (15 m)	Lake is the centerpiece of 10,778 acres (4,362 ha) Kirwin National Wildlife Refuge
Kanopolis Lake	50,273	3,406 acres (1,378 ha)	35 feet (11 m)	12,500 acres (5,100 ha) of recreational land
John Redmond Reservoir	50,040	9,400 acres (3,804 ha)	12 feet (3.7 m)	20,000 acres (8,100 ha) of recreational land
Council Grove Lake	43,984	3,310 acres (1,340 ha)	56 feet (17 m)	2,638 acres (1,068 ha) of recreational land
Webster Reservoir	37,926	3,740 acres (1,514 ha)	42 feet (13 m)	3,164 acres (1,280 ha) of recreational land
Elk City Lake	37,422	4,450 acres (1,801 ha)	24 feet (7.3 m)	12,000 acres (4,900 ha) of recreational land
Keith Sebelius Reservoir	35,935	2,181 acres (883 ha)	42 feet (13 m)	5,668 acres (2,294 ha) of recreational land
Big Hill Lake	23,361	1,240 acres (502 ha)	60 feet (18 m)	1,280 acres (520 ha) of recreational land; 17 mile (27 km) horse trail
Fall River Lake	20,690	2,450 acres (991 ha)	30 feet (9.1 m)	20,100 acres (8,100 ha) of recreational land, including Flint Hills National Wildlife Refuge
Toronto Lake	16,528	2,800 acres (1,133 ha)	45 feet (14 m)	5,775 acres (2,337 ha) of recreational land
Lovewell Reservoir	15,284	2,986 acres (1,208 ha)	35 feet (11 m)	2,229 acres (902 ha) of recreational land
Centralia Lake		400 acres (162 ha)	25 feet (7.6 m)	560 acres (230 ha) of recreational land

Sources: Army Corps of Engineers, Bureau of Reclamation, Kansas State Parks. Copan, Hulah, and Kaw lakes extend into Kansas but are mostly in Oklahoma.

== Natural lakes ==
- Cheyenne Bottoms 15,500 acres (6,300 ha) of wetland and marsh in 41,000 acres (17,000 ha) lowland
- Lake Inman
- Lake View Lake
- Quivira National Wildlife Refuge 7,000 acres (2,800 ha) of wetland and marsh in 22,135 acres (8,958 ha) refuge

== Man-made lakes ==
=== Lakes managed by the U.S. Army Corps of Engineers ===
- Big Hill Lake
- Clinton Lake
- Council Grove Lake
- El Dorado Lake
- Elk City Lake
- Fall River Lake
- Hillsdale Lake
- John Redmond Reservoir
- Kanopolis Lake
- Marion Reservoir
- Melvern Lake
- Milford Lake
- Perry Lake
- Pomona Lake
- Toronto Lake
- Tuttle Creek Lake
- Wilson Lake
- Wabaunsee Lake

=== Reservoirs managed by the Bureau of Reclamation ===
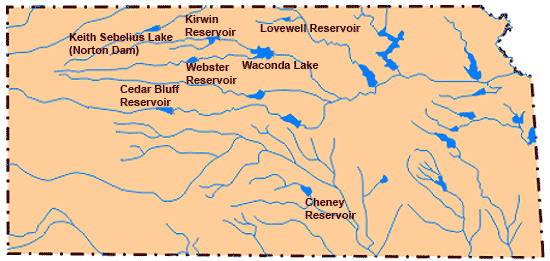
A map showing location of Bureau of Reclamation lakes in Kansas.

- Cedar Bluff Reservoir
- Cheney Reservoir
- Keith Sebelius Lake
- Kirwin Reservoir
- Lovewell Reservoir
- Waconda Lake
- Webster Reservoir

=== Reservoirs managed by the Kansas Department of Wildlife and Parks ===
- Farlington Lake
- Jamestown Lake
- Neosho State Fishing Lake aka Lake McKinley

=== Reservoirs managed by other group ===
- Lake Jivaro
- Lake Vaquero

== Diversion dams ==
- Almena Diversion Dam
- Woodston Diversion Dam
