= Slough Creek =

Slough Creek may refer to a water body in the United States:

- Slough Creek (Wyoming), in Montana and Wyoming
- Slough Creek (Morris County, Kansas)
