= El Dorado Lake =

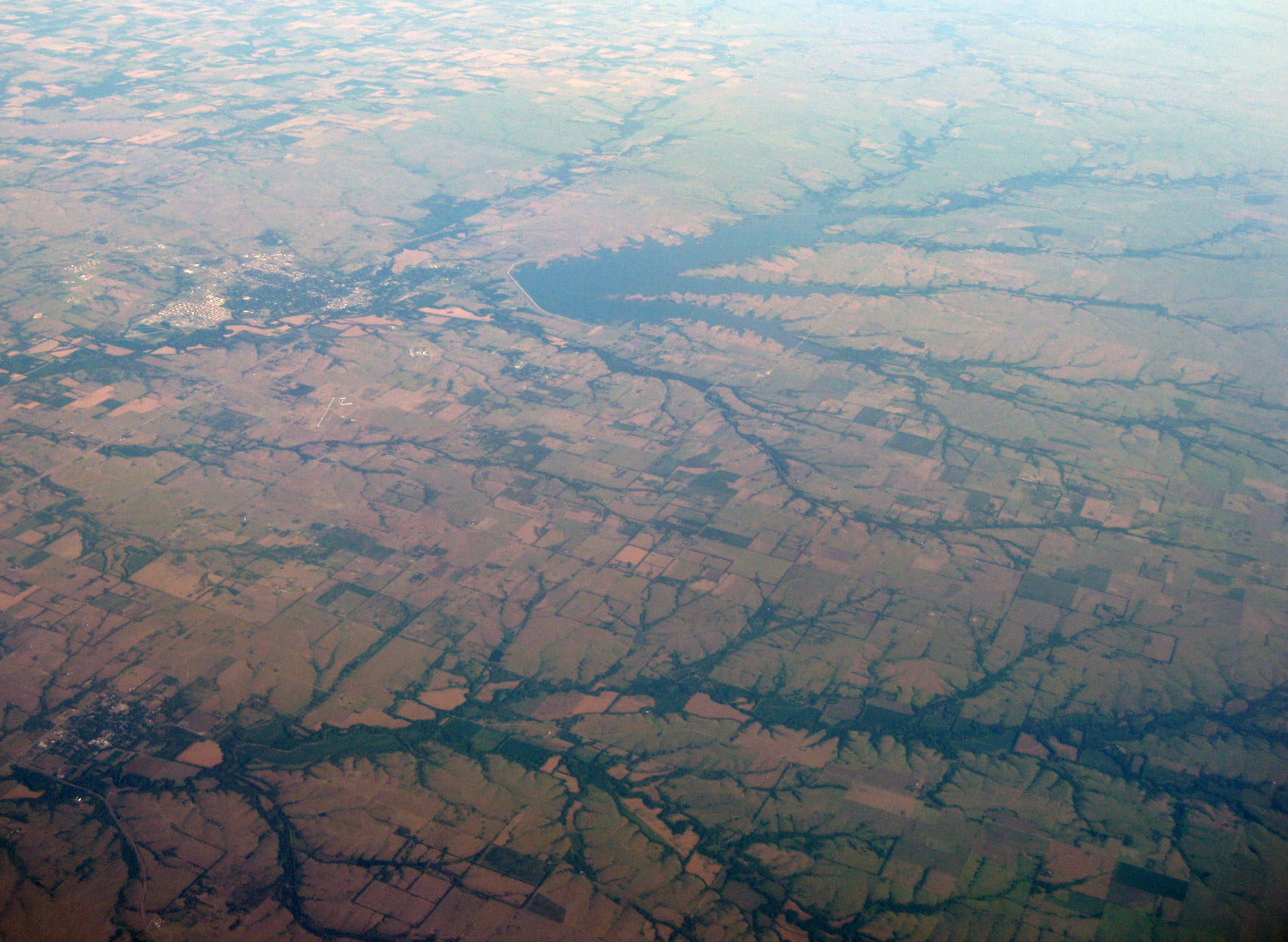
- Aerial photo of El Dorado Lake and vicinity, facing northwest (2011)

- Location within Kansas Location within the United States

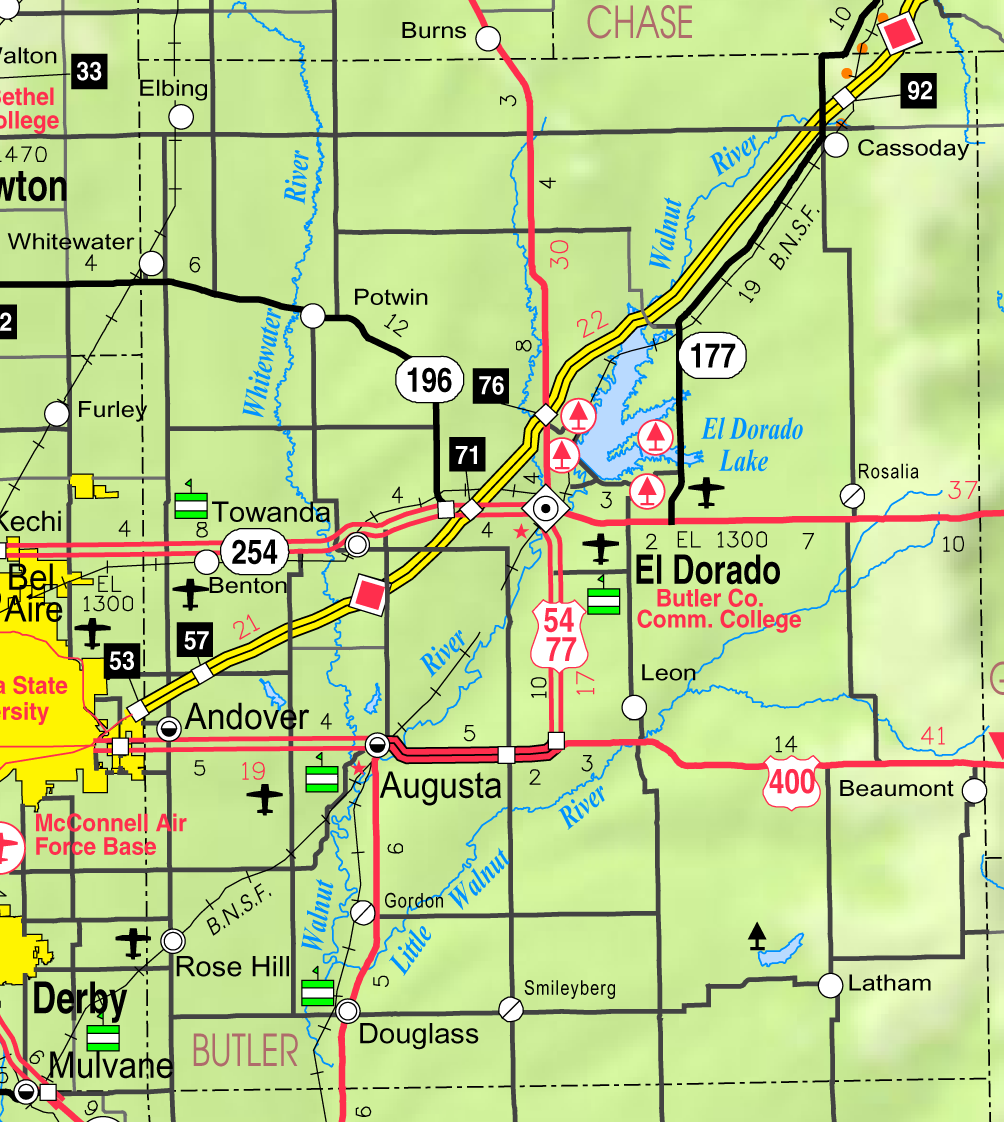
- KDOT map of Butler County (legend)
- Location: Butler County, Kansas
- Coordinates: 37°50′50″N 96°49′23″W
- Type: Reservoir
- Primary inflows: Walnut River
- Primary outflows: Walnut River
- Catchment area: 247 sq mi (640 km^{2})
- Basin countries: United States
- Managing agency: U.S. Army Corps of Engineers
- Built: October 1973
- First flooded: June 1981
- Surface area: 8,000 acres (32 km^{2})
- Average depth: 19 ft (5.8 m)
- Max. depth: 60 ft (18 m)
- Water volume: Full: 158,189 acre⋅ft (195,123,000 m^{3}); Current (Nov. 2015): 150,702 acre⋅ft (185,888,000 m^{3})
- Shore length^{1}: 98 miles (158 km)
- Surface elevation: Full: 1,339 ft (408 m); Current (Nov. 2015): 1,338 ft (408 m)
- Settlements: El Dorado
- ^{1} Shore length is not a well-defined measure.

El Dorado Lake is a reservoir on the Walnut River 0.5 miles (0.80 km) northeast of El Dorado in the Flint Hills region of Kansas. Built and managed by the U.S. Army Corps of Engineers, it is used for flood control, recreation, and water supply. El Dorado State Park is located on its shore.

== History ==
The Flood Control Act of 1965 authorized construction of El Dorado Lake. The U.S. Army Corps of Engineers held groundbreaking ceremonies in September 1973, and construction began the following month. The reservoir became fully operational for flood control June 29, 1981.

Construction of El Dorado Lake incorporated two pre-existing smaller reservoirs: Bluestem Lake and the original El Dorado Lake. The original El Dorado Lake was built on Satchel Creek in 1927 as a water supply for the community of El Dorado. Bluestem Lake was built on Bemis Creek in the 1950s. The dams of both reservoirs were breached during the building of the larger El Dorado Lake and their waters subsequently inundated. The remnants of Bluestem Lake's dam are still visible in the Shady Creek arm of the present-day reservoir.

== Geography ==
El Dorado Lake is located at 37°50′50″N 96°49′23″W (37.8472402, -96.8230838) at an elevation of 1,335 feet (407 m). It lies in the Flint Hills in south-central Kansas. The entirety of the reservoir lies within Butler County.

The reservoir is impounded at its southwestern end by El Dorado Lake Dam. The Walnut River is both the reservoir's primary inflow from the north and outflow to the southwest. Smaller tributaries include: Gilmore Branch and Cole Creek from the north, Durechen Creek from the northeast, and Satchel Creek, Bemis Creek, and Shady Creek from the east.

The Kansas Turnpike (Interstate 35) runs northeast-southwest across the northern end of the lake and then parallel to its northwestern shore. U.S. Route 77 runs north-south west of the reservoir, and U.S. Route 54 runs east-west 1.5 miles (2.4 km) south of the reservoir. Kansas Highway 177 runs north-south across the lake's eastern arms. Boulder Bluff Road, a paved county road, runs around the dam to the south, connecting with Shady Creek Access Road, another paved county road, which runs east-west immediately south of the reservoir.

The reservoir's namesake, the city of El Dorado, is located just southwest of the dam.

== Hydrography ==
The surface area, surface elevation, and water volume of the reservoir fluctuate based on inflow and local climatic conditions. In terms of capacity, the Corps of Engineers vertically divides the reservoir into a set of pools based on volume and water level, and the reservoir is considered full when filled to the capacity of its conservation pool. When full, El Dorado Lake has a surface area of 8,000 acres (32 km^{2}), a surface elevation of 1,339 feet (408 m), and a volume of 158,189 acre-feet (195,123,000 m^{3}). When filled to maximum capacity, it has a surface area of 10,700 acres (43 km^{2}), a surface elevation of 1,347.5 feet (410.7 m), and a volume of 240,660 acre-feet (296,850,000 m^{3}).

The streambed underlying the reservoir has an elevation of 1,271.5 feet (387.6 m).

== Infrastructure ==
El Dorado Lake Dam is a rolled earth-fill embankment dam that stands 99 feet (30 m) above the streambed and 20,930 feet (6,380 m) long. At its crest, the dam has an elevation of 1,370.5 feet (417.7 m). An uncontrolled, 350-foot (110 m) spillway is located near the northwest end of the dam. Additional outlet works include an 11.5-foot (3.5 m) by 15.75-foot (4.80 m) oval conduit. The estimated peak discharge capacity is 41,200 cubic feet per second (1,170 m^{3}/s).

== Management ==
The Tulsa District of the U.S. Army Corps of Engineers manages the dam and reservoir. The Corps has licensed the Kansas Department of Wildlife, Parks and Tourism (KDWP) to develop and manage approximately 4,000 acres (16 km^{2}) of land around the reservoir as El Dorado State Park and another 4,000 acres (16 km^{2}) of land as the El Dorado Wildlife Area. The KDWP also manages boating on the reservoir surface and local fisheries.

== Parks and recreation ==
El Dorado State Park is divided into four areas spread around the shore of the southern portion of the reservoir: the Bluestem Point Area is located between the reservoir's two eastern arms; the Boulder Bluff Area lies along the western shore; the Shady Creek Area is located on the south shore of the reservoir's southeastern arm; the Walnut River Area lies immediately southwest of the dam. All four areas include boat ramps, camping facilities, and hiking trails. In addition, the Bluestem Point Area hosts a bait shop and a swimming beach, a marina operates in the Shady Creek Area, and the Walnut River Area includes an amphitheater and swimming pond.

El Dorado Lake is open for sport fishing. Hunting is permitted in the El Dorado Wildlife Area as well as on 2,000 acres (8.1 km^{2}) of land in El Dorado State Park.

== Wildlife ==
Fish species resident in El Dorado Lake include blue and channel catfish, rainbow trout, walleye, white bass, white crappie, and wiper. Two invasive species, the white perch and the zebra mussel, live in the lake as well. Game animals living on land around the reservoir include beavers, bobcats, coyotes, deer, doves, pheasants, prairie chickens, quail, rabbits, raccoons, squirrels, and turkeys.

== See also ==
- List of Kansas state parks
- List of lakes, reservoirs, and dams in Kansas
- List of rivers of Kansas
