= Crawford State Park =

Crawford State Park may refer to:

- Crawford State Park (Colorado)
- Crawford State Park (Kansas)
- Crawford State Park (Washington)
