= El Dorado State Park =

State park in Kansas, United States

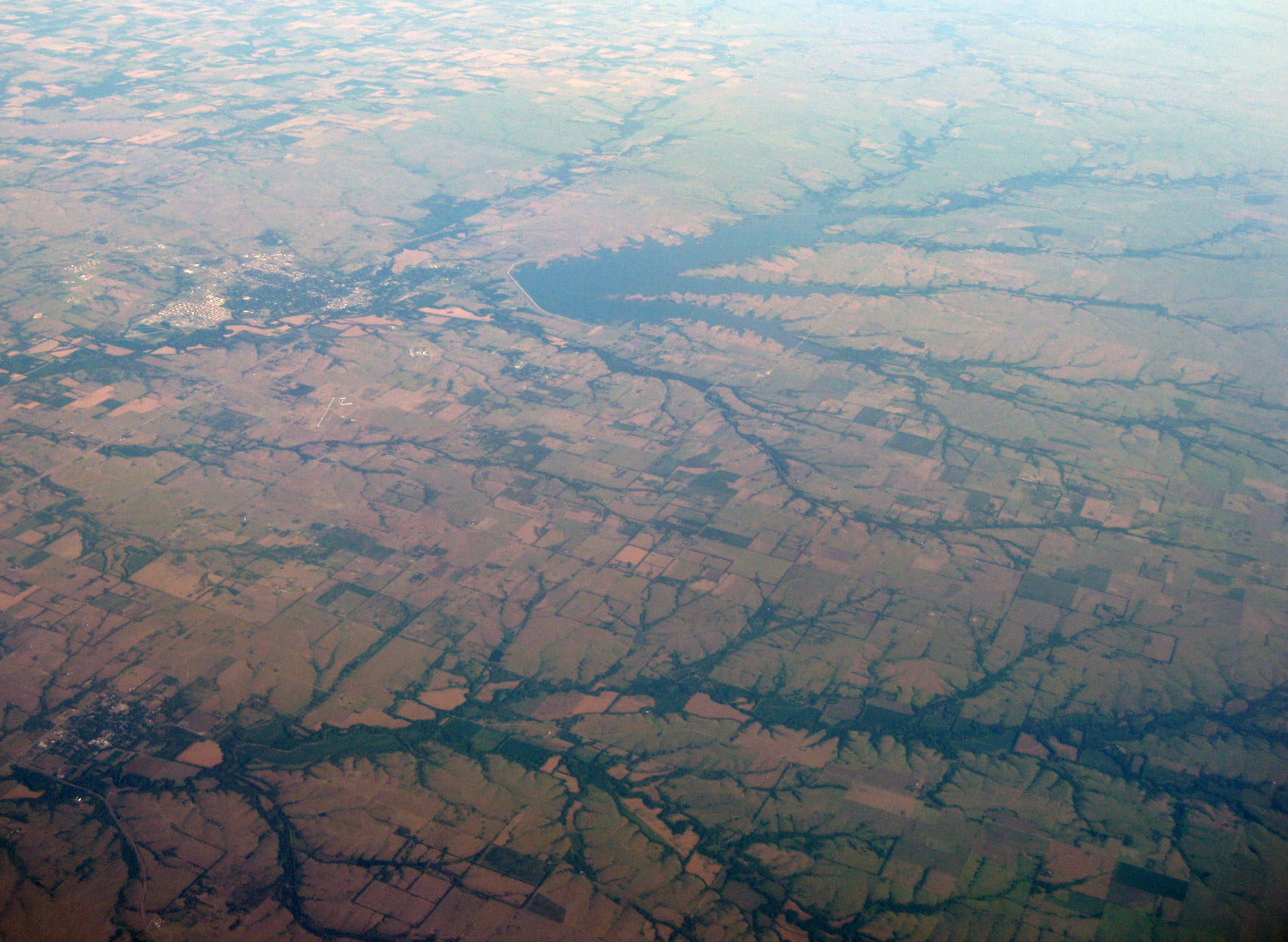
- El Dorado Reservoir - aerial view looking north

- Location within Kansas Location within the United States
- Interactive map of El Dorado State Park
- Location: Butler County, Kansas, United States
- Coordinates: 37°51′40″N 96°46′19″W
- Area: 2,000 acres (810 ha)
- Elevation: 1,352 ft (412 m)
- Established: 1979
- Administrator: Kansas Department of Wildlife and Parks
- Visitors: 1,615,212 (in 2022)
- Website: Official website
- Kansas State Parks

El Dorado State Park is a state park in Butler County, Kansas, United States, located just north of El Dorado. The park sits in the scenic Flint Hills along the eastern and western shores of El Dorado Reservoir.

Crappie and largemouth bass fishing are good in standing timber and around fish attractors. Walleye fishing is good along the face of the dam and on the old railroad bed. Channel catfish is good lakewide, as well as in the river below the outlet. Flathead fishing is good in a variety of areas, especially Old Bluestem Lake.

Regarded as one of the state's most handicapped accessible parks, El Dorado contains 1,100 campsites which offer visitors a range of choices. Other facilities include two swimming beaches, 10 group shelters, and a 24-site group campground. A large amphitheater accommodates a variety of concerts and festivals. Trail users will find a variety of attractions, including a designated horse campground.

== See also ==
- List of lakes, reservoirs, and dams in Kansas
- List of rivers of Kansas
