= Jivaro =

Jivaro or Jibaro, also spelled Hivaro or Hibaro, may refer to:

- Jíbaro (Puerto Rico), mountain-dwelling peasants in Puerto Rico
- Jíbaro music, a Puerto Rican musical genre
- Jivaroan peoples, indigenous peoples in northern Peru and eastern Ecuador
- Shuar or "Jivaro", one of the Jivaroan peoples
- Chicham languages (Jivaroan), a language family of northern Peru and eastern Ecuador
- Jivaro (film), a 1954 American 3-D film
- Jíbaro (film), English title Wild Dogs, a 1985 Cuban film
- Lake Jivaro, a reservoir in Shawnee County, Kansas, United States
- Jibaro, the final episode of season three of Love, Death + Robots which won several awards.
