= Munkers Creek =

Coordinates: 38.721244°N 96.507425°W

- Location within Kansas Location within the United States

Physical characteristics
- Source
  - location: Morris County, Kansas, United States
- Mouth
  - location: Council Grove Reservoir, Wabaunsee County, Kansas, United States
- Length: 15 mi (24 km)

Munkers Creek is a 15-mile (24 km) long stream in Morris County, Kansas and Wabaunsee County, Kansas, in the United States. It ends at Council Grove Reservoir.

Munkers Creek was named for J. C. Munkers, a pioneer settler.

== See also ==
- List of rivers of Kansas
