= Lake Inman =

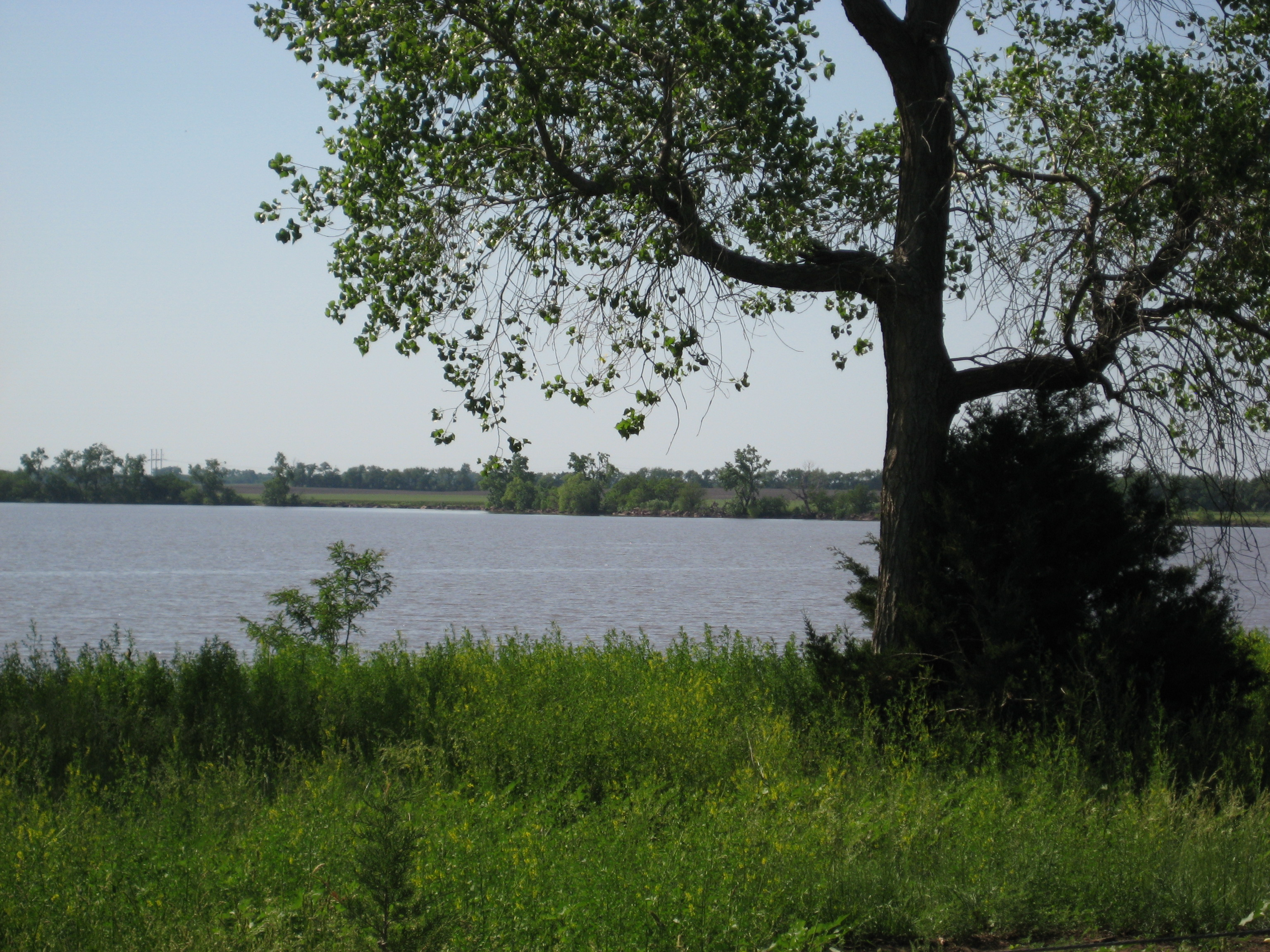

- Location within Kansas Location within the United States

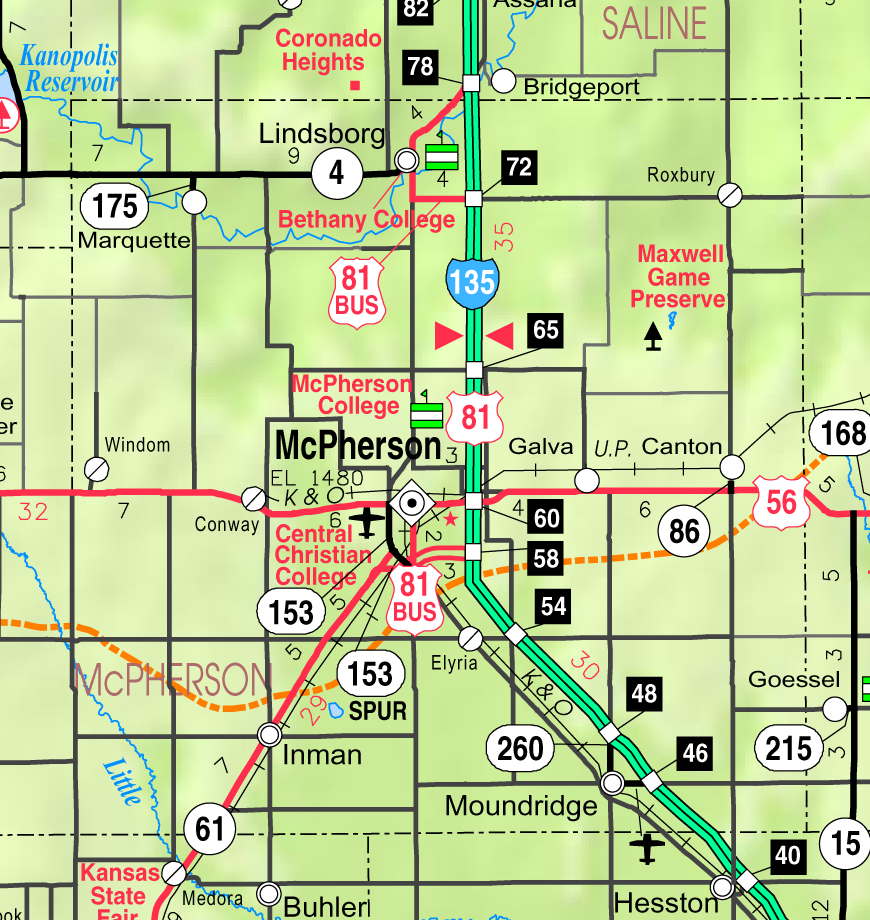
- KDOT map of McPherson County (legend)
- Location: McPherson County, Kansas
- Coordinates: 38°14′50″N 97°43′09″W
- Type: Lake
- Basin countries: United States
- Surface area: 0.25 sq mi (0.65 km^{2})
- Surface elevation: 1,447 ft (441 m)
- Settlements: Inman, Groveland

Lake Inman is a small lake in McPherson County, Kansas, United States. It is located 2.5 miles (4.0 km) northeast of the city of Inman. With a surface area of approximately 0.25 square miles (0.65 km^{2}), it is the largest natural lake in the state. It was named for frontiersman and author Henry Inman, who wrote articles about fishing that prompted Kansas legislation. Lake Inman is part of the McPherson Valley Wetlands, a disconnected complex of wetlands important for migrating waterfowl.

== See also ==
- List of Kansas state parks
- List of lakes, reservoirs, and dams in Kansas
- List of rivers of Kansas
