= Inman, Kansas =

City in McPherson County, Kansas

- City
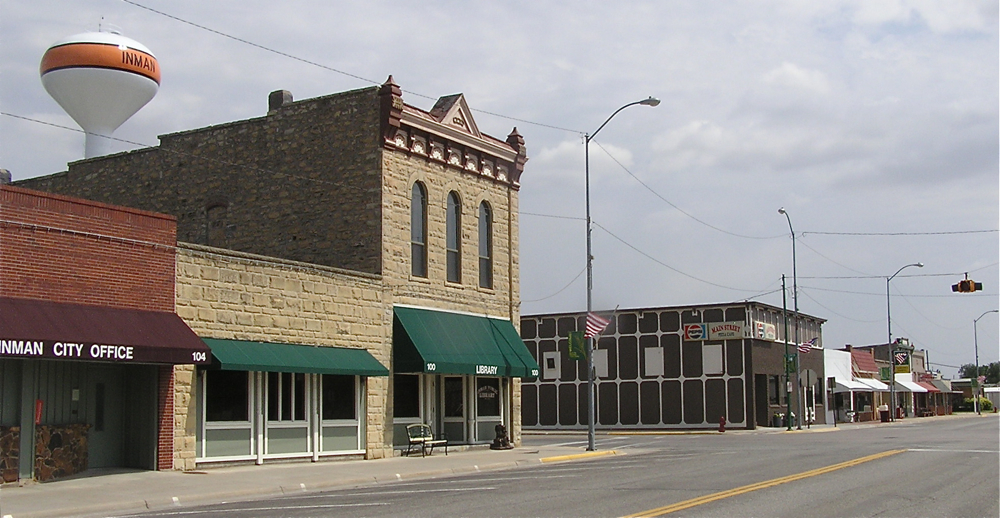
- Main Street in Inman (2012)

- Location within McPherson County and Kansas

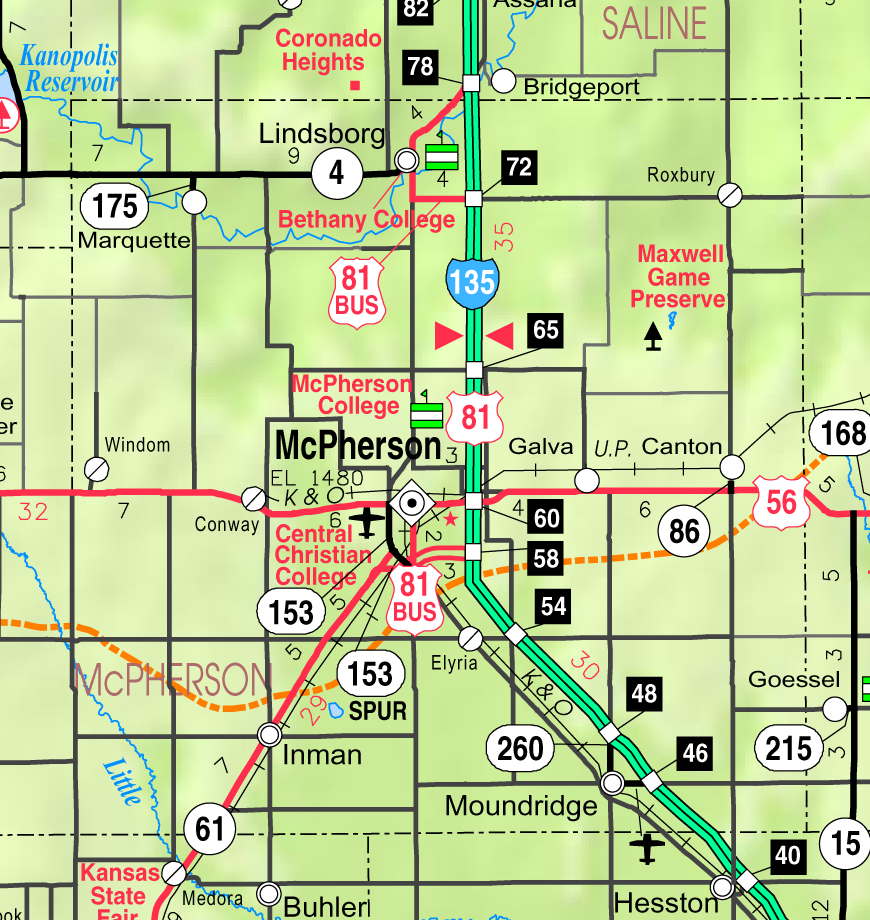
- KDOT map of McPherson County (legend)
- Coordinates: 38°13′57″N 97°46′19″W
- Country: United States
- State: Kansas
- County: McPherson
- Incorporated: 1887
- Named for: Henry Inman

Area
  - Total: 0.80 sq mi (2.06 km^{2})
  - Land: 0.77 sq mi (1.99 km^{2})
  - Water: 0.027 sq mi (0.07 km^{2})
- Elevation: 1,526 ft (465 m)

Population (2020)
  - Total: 1,341
  - Density: 1,750/sq mi (674/km^{2})
- Time zone: UTC-6 (CST)
  - Summer (DST): UTC-5 (CDT)
- ZIP Code: 67546
- Area code: 620
- FIPS code: 20-34275
- GNIS ID: 2395427
- Website: www.cityofinmanks.gov

Inman is a city in McPherson County, Kansas, United States. As of the 2020 census, the population of the city was 1,341.

== History ==
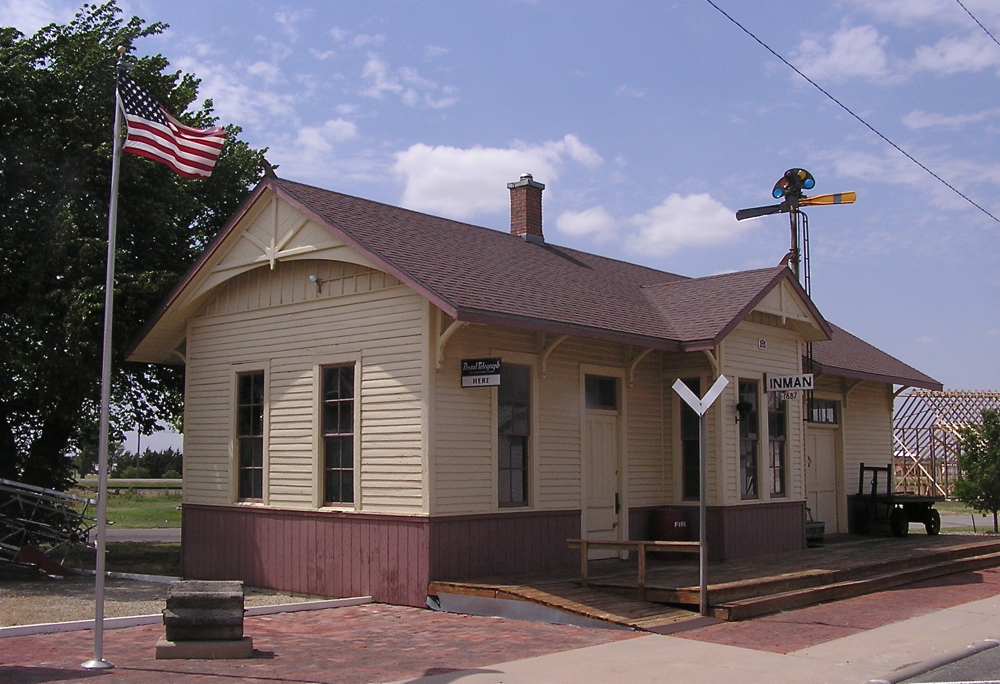
Former Rock Island railroad station in Inman (2012)

For millennia, the land now known as Kansas was inhabited by Native Americans. In 1803, most of modern Kansas was secured by the United States as part of the Louisiana Purchase. In 1854, the Kansas Territory was organized, then in 1861 Kansas became the 34th U.S. state. In 1867, McPherson County was founded.

It was founded in 1887 as Aiken. It was renamed Inman, in 1889, after Major Henry Inman, who was first the namesake for Lake Inman, located approximately 4 miles (6 km) east of the town.

In 1887, the Chicago, Kansas and Nebraska Railway built a main line from Herington through Inman to Pratt. In 1888, this line was extended to Liberal. Later, it was extended to Tucumcari, New Mexico and El Paso, Texas. It foreclosed in 1891 and taken over by Chicago, Rock Island and Pacific Railway, which shut down in 1980 and reorganized as Oklahoma, Kansas and Texas Railroad, merged in 1988 with Missouri Pacific Railroad, merged in 1997 with Union Pacific Railroad. Most locals still refer to this railroad as the "Rock Island".

== Geography ==
According to the United States Census Bureau, the city has a total area of 0.59 square miles (1.53 km^{2}), all land.

=== Climate ===
The climate in this area is characterized by hot, humid summers and generally mild to cool winters. According to the Köppen Climate Classification system, Inman has a humid subtropical climate, abbreviated "Cfa" on climate maps.

== Demographics ==
Historical population
Census	Pop.	Note	%±
1900	352		—
1910	484		37.5%
1920	482		−0.4%
1930	533		10.6%
1940	507		−4.9%
1950	615		21.3%
1960	729		18.5%
1970	836		14.7%
1980	947		13.3%
1990	1,035		9.3%
2000	1,142		10.3%
2010	1,377		20.6%
2020	1,341		−2.6%
U.S. Decennial Census

=== 2020 census ===
The 2020 United States census counted 1,341 people, 528 households, and 329 families in Inman. The population density was 1,741.6 per square mile (672.4/km^{2}). There were 580 housing units at an average density of 753.2 per square mile (290.8/km^{2}). The racial makeup was 94.63% (1,269) white or European American (94.11% non-Hispanic white), 0.52% (7) black or African-American, 0.22% (3) Native American or Alaska Native, 0.22% (3) Asian, 0.0% (0) Pacific Islander or Native Hawaiian, 0.82% (11) from other races, and 3.58% (48) from two or more races. Hispanic or Latino of any race was 1.12% (15) of the population.

Of the 528 households, 29.0% had children under the age of 18; 54.2% were married couples living together; 26.5% had a female householder with no spouse or partner present. 33.0% of households consisted of individuals and 22.7% had someone living alone who was 65 years of age or older. The average household size was 2.3 and the average family size was 2.9. The percent of those with a bachelor's degree or higher was estimated to be 16.6% of the population.

22.4% of the population was under the age of 18, 6.0% from 18 to 24, 22.4% from 25 to 44, 20.2% from 45 to 64, and 28.9% who were 65 years of age or older. The median age was 44.0 years. For every 100 females, there were 117.0 males. For every 100 females ages 18 and older, there were 119.2 males.

The 2016–2020 5-year American Community Survey estimates show that the median household income was $53,438 (with a margin of error of +/- $12,042) and the median family income was $74,792 (+/- $22,685). Males had a median income of $53,846 (+/- $6,491) versus $32,143 (+/- $4,660) for females. The median income for those above 16 years old was $43,839 (+/- $5,581). Approximately, 4.1% of families and 7.9% of the population were below the poverty line, including 10.5% of those under the age of 18 and 13.6% of those ages 65 or over.

=== 2010 census ===
As of the census of 2010, there were 1,377 people, 513 households, and 347 families residing in the city. The population density was 2,333.9 inhabitants per square mile (901.1/km^{2}). There were 566 housing units at an average density of 959.3 per square mile (370.4/km^{2}). The racial makeup of the city was 96.0% White, 0.1% African American, 0.4% Native American, 0.3% Asian, 0.7% from other races, and 2.5% from two or more races. Hispanic or Latino of any race were 3.1% of the population.

There were 513 households, of which 31.0% had children under the age of 18 living with them, 59.6% were married couples living together, 5.7% had a female householder with no husband present, 2.3% had a male householder with no wife present, and 32.4% were non-families. 29.4% of all households were made up of individuals, and 19.5% had someone living alone who was 65 years of age or older. The average household size was 2.45 and the average family size was 3.04.

The median age in the city was 45.2 years. 23.5% of residents were under the age of 18; 6.6% were between the ages of 18 and 24; 19.7% were from 25 to 44; 20% were from 45 to 64; and 30.1% were 65 years of age or older. The gender makeup of the city was 47.1% male and 52.9% female.

=== 2000 census ===
As of the census of 2000, there were 1,142 people, 494 households, and 334 families residing in the city. The population density was 2,106.0 inhabitants per square mile (813.1/km^{2}). There were 518 housing units at an average density of 955.2 per square mile (368.8/km^{2}). The racial makeup of the city was 98.42% White, 0.35% Native American, 0.44% from other races, and 0.79% from two or more races. Hispanic or Latino of any race were 1.40% of the population.

There were 494 households, out of which 27.1% had children under the age of 18 living with them, 61.3% were married couples living together, 4.9% had a female householder with no husband present, and 32.2% were non-families. 30.2% of all households were made up of individuals, and 21.7% had someone living alone who was 65 years of age or older. The average household size was 2.31 and the average family size was 2.87.

In the city, the population was spread out, with 24.3% under the age of 18, 7.2% from 18 to 24, 22.4% from 25 to 44, 16.7% from 45 to 64, and 29.3% who were 65 years of age or older. The median age was 42 years. For every 100 females, there were 93.6 males. For every 100 females age 18 and over, there were 88.2 males.

The median income for a household in the city was US$31,648, and the median income for a family was $40,804. Males had a median income of $31,875 versus $19,615 for females. The per capita income for the city was $17,290. About 2.9% of families and 5.7% of the population were below the poverty line, including 6.2% of those under age 18 and 6.1% of those age 65 or over.

== Education ==
The community is served by Inman USD 448 public school district. Inman has two schools:

- Inman Jr-Sr High School
- Inman Elementary School

=== Sports ===
The Inman Teutons have won the following Kansas State High School championships:

- 1947 Boys Basketball - Class B
- 1956 Boys Basketball - Class B
- 1967 Boys Basketball - Class B
- 1967 Boys Track & Field (Indoor) - Class B
- 1971 Boys Track & Field (Indoor) - Class 2A
- 1989 Girls Volleyball - Class 2A
- 1993 Girls Basketball - Class 2A
- 1994 Boys Basketball - Class 2A
- 1994 Girls Volleyball - Class 2A
- 2023 Boys Track & Field - Class 2A

== Transportation ==
The Chicago, Rock Island and Pacific Railroad previously provided passenger and freight rail service to Inman. The depot was built circa July 4, 1887 when the track was laid through town. The depot closed on November 30, 1979 and later became a museum.

== See also ==
- List of people from McPherson County, Kansas
- Threshing Stone
- Santa Fe Trail
