= Inman USD 448 =

Public school district in Inman, Kansas

Address
- 119 S. Main St. Inman, Kansas, 67546; United States
- Coordinates: 38°13′51″N 97°46′33″W

District information
- Type: Public
- Grades: K to 12
- Schools: 2

Other information
- Website: usd448.com

Inman USD 448 is a public unified school district headquartered in Inman, Kansas, United States. The district includes the communities of Inman, Groveland, and nearby rural areas.

== Schools ==
The school district operates the following schools:

- Inman Jr./Sr. High School
- Inman Elementary School

== See also ==
- List of high schools in Kansas
- List of unified school districts in Kansas
- Kansas State Department of Education
- Kansas State High School Activities Association
