= Pomona Lake =

- Location within Kansas Location within the United States

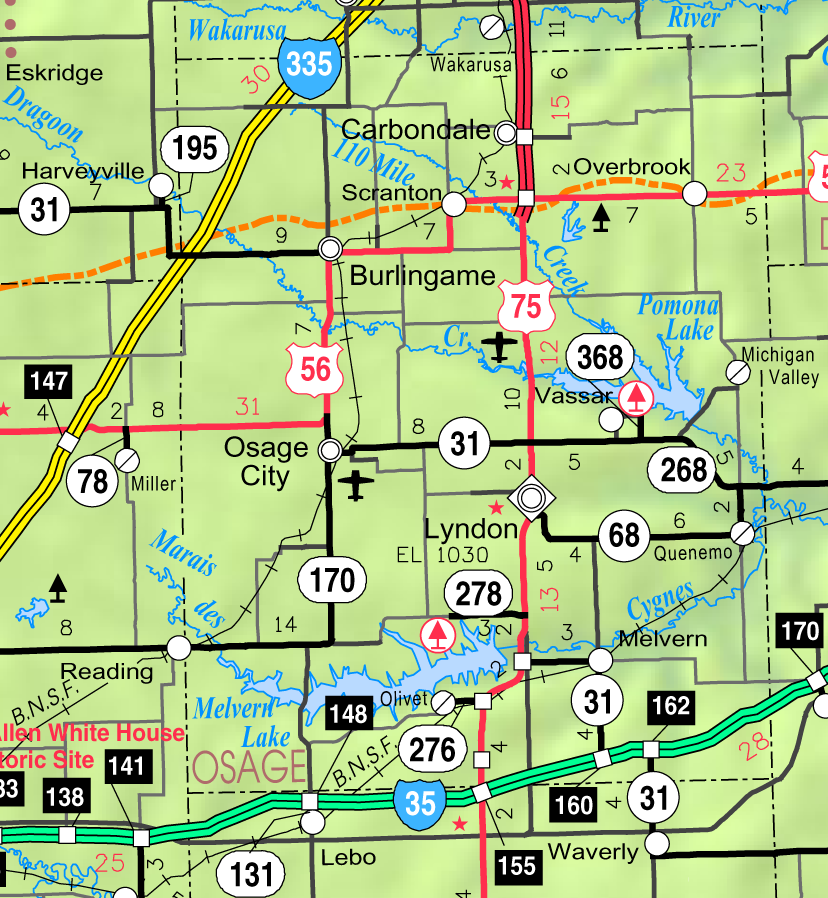
- KDOT map of Osage County (legend)
- Location: Osage County
- Coordinates: 38°40′14″N 95°38′36″W
- Type: Reservoir
- Primary inflows: Dragoon Creek
- Primary outflows: Hundred and Ten Mile Creek
- Basin countries: United States
- Managing agency: U.S. Army Corps of Engineers
- Built: 1963
- Surface area: 6.25 sq mi (16.2 km^{2})
- Water volume: 64,597 acre⋅ft (0.079679 km^{3})
- Surface elevation: 974 ft (297 m)
- Settlements: Vassar

Pomona Lake, also known as Pomona Reservoir, is a lake in Osage County, Kansas. Pomona State Park and Michigan Valley Park lie on its shores.

== History ==
Pomona Lake was created in 1963 with the construction of the Pomona Lake Dam. It was built by the U.S. Army Corps of Engineers under the Flood Act of 1954. Pomona Lake was built on the Hundred and Ten Mile Creek, which also serves as its outlet.

== Economy ==
There are marinas located at Pomona State Park and Michigan Valley Park, allowing visitors to use the boat ramps to access the lake. Fishing docks and swimming beaches are also located in the parks.

== See also ==
- List of Kansas state parks
- List of lakes, reservoirs, and dams in Kansas
- List of rivers of Kansas
