= Groveland, Kansas =

Unincorporated community in McPherson County, Kansas

Coordinates: 38°17′35″N 97°43′46″W

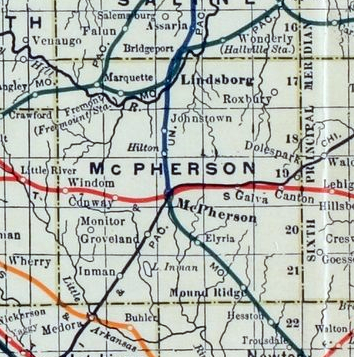
1915 railroad map of McPherson County

Groveland is an unincorporated community in McPherson County, Kansas, United States. It is located southwest of McPherson at K-61 highway and Comanche Rd.

== History ==
The post office in Groveland closed in 1912.

== Education ==
The community is served by Inman USD 448 public school district.

== See also ==
- Lake Inman
