= Council Grove Lake =

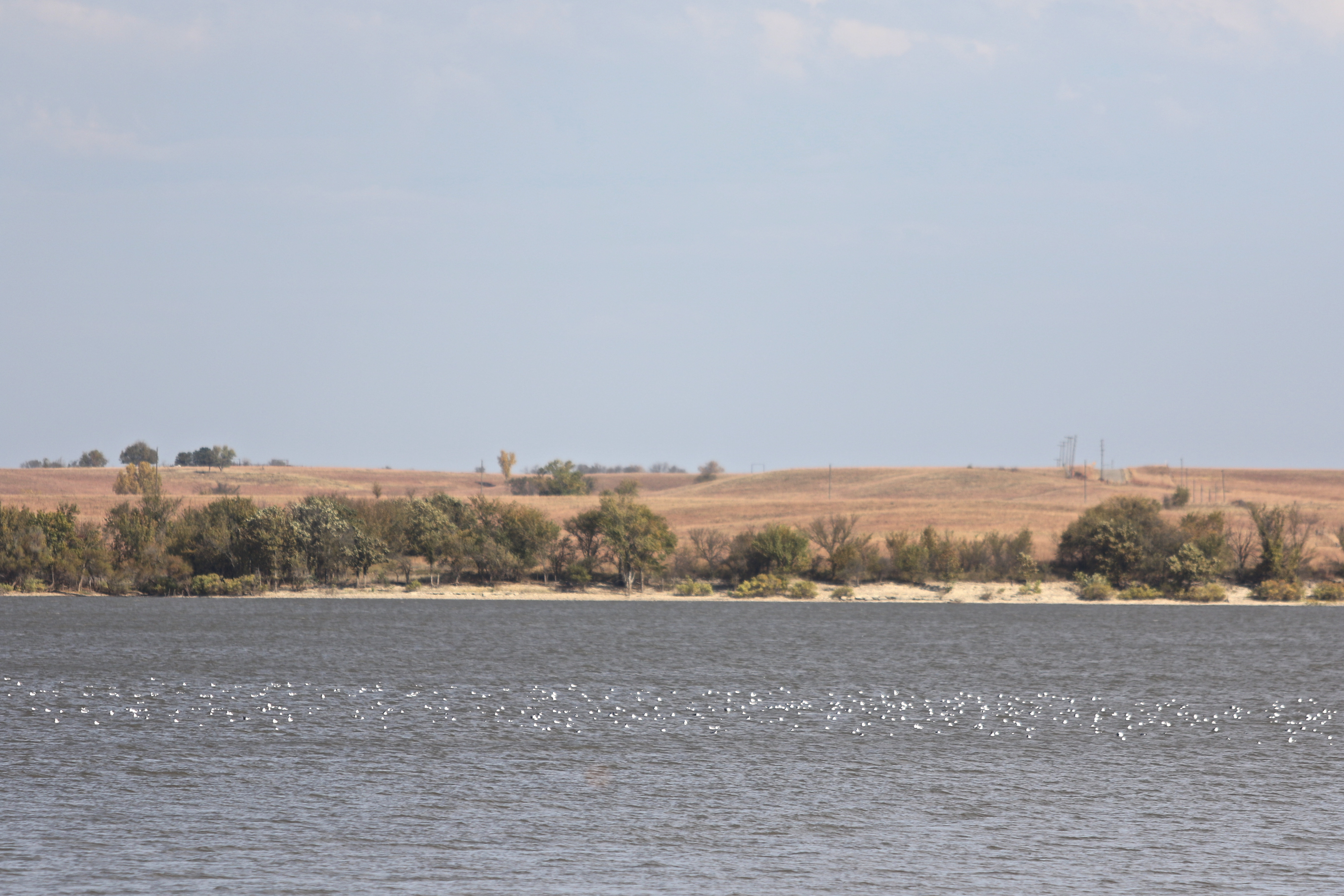

- Location within Kansas Location within the United States

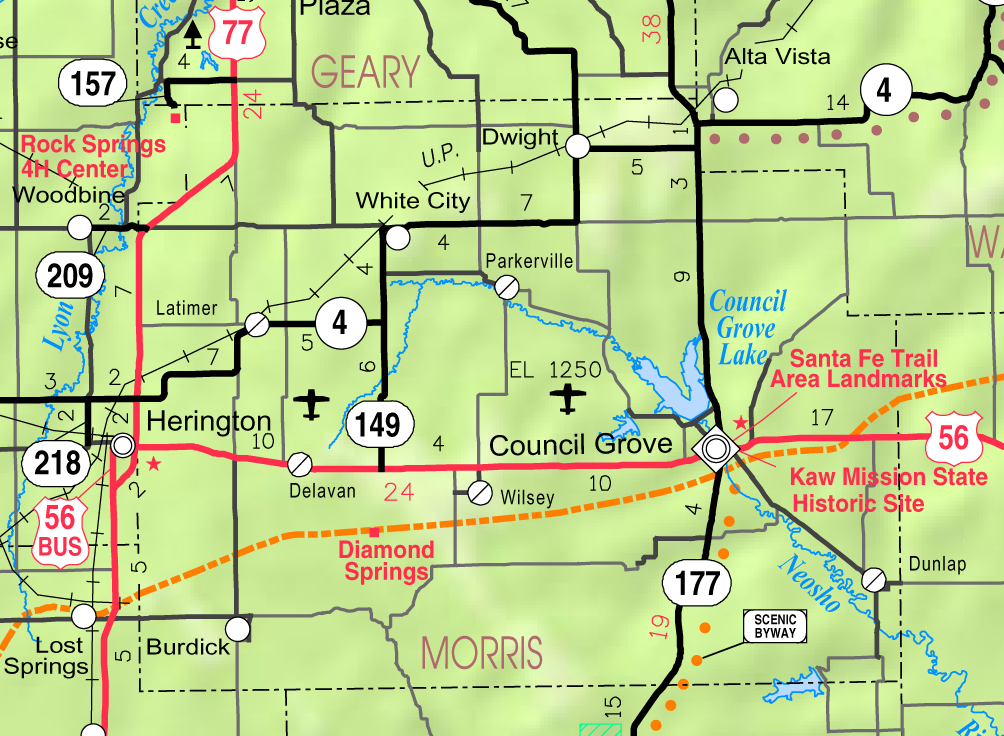
- KDOT map of Morris County (legend)
- Location: Morris County, Kansas
- Coordinates: 38°41′59″N 96°31′10″W
- Type: Reservoir
- Primary inflows: Munkers Creek, Neosho River
- Primary outflows: Neosho River
- Catchment area: 245 sq mi (630 km^{2})
- Basin countries: United States
- Managing agency: U.S. Army Corps of Engineers
- Built: June 1960
- First flooded: October 9, 1964
- Surface area: 3,235 acres (13.09 km^{2})
- Max. depth: 56 ft (17 m)
- Water volume: Full: 43,984 acre⋅ft (54,253,000 m^{3}); Current (Jan. 2016): 44,443 acre⋅ft (54,820,000 m^{3})
- Shore length^{1}: 40 mi (64 km)
- Surface elevation: Full: 1,274 ft (388 m); Current (Jan. 2016): 1,274 ft (388 m)
- Settlements: Council Grove
- ^{1} Shore length is not a well-defined measure.

Council Grove Lake is a reservoir on the Neosho River in east-central Kansas. Built and managed by the U.S. Army Corps of Engineers, it is used for flood control, recreation, and water supply.

== History ==
The Flood Control Act of 1950 authorized the building of Council Grove Dam and Lake, named after the nearby community of Council Grove, Kansas. The effects of the Great Flood of 1951 further demonstrated the need for the project, and the Tulsa District of the U.S. Army Corps of Engineers began construction in June 1960. The reservoir was completed at a total cost of $11.5 million and became operational for flood control on October 9, 1964.

== Geography ==
Council Grove Lake is located at 38°41′59″N 96°31′10″W (38.6997978, -96.5195795) at an elevation of 1,274 feet (388 m). It lies in the Flint Hills in east-central Kansas. The entirety of the reservoir lies within Morris County.

The reservoir is impounded at its southeastern end by Council Grove Dam. The dam is located at 38°40′50″N 96°30′16″W (38.6805627, -96.5044475) at an elevation of 1,276 feet (389 m). The reservoir consists of two arms: a western arm whose primary inflow is the Neosho River from the northwest and an eastern arm whose primary inflow is Munkers Creek from the northeast. The Neosho River is the reservoir's outflow to the southeast. Smaller tributaries of the western arm are Slough Creek from the north and Canning Creek from the southwest; other tributaries of the eastern arm include Short Creek from the north and Richey Creek from the east.

U.S. Route 56 runs generally east-west roughly 1.5 miles (2.4 km) south of the reservoir. Kansas Highway 177 runs generally north-south along the reservoir's eastern shore. Lake Road, a paved county road, runs along the southwest shore.

The reservoir's namesake, the city of Council Grove, lies approximately 1 mile (1.6 km) southeast of the dam.

== Hydrography ==
The surface area, surface elevation, and water volume of the reservoir fluctuate based on inflow and local climatic conditions. In terms of capacity, the Corps of Engineers vertically divides the reservoir into a set of pools based on volume and water level, and the reservoir is considered full when filled to the capacity of its conservation pool. When full, Council Grove Lake has a surface area of 3,235 acres (13.09 km^{2}), a surface elevation of 1,274 feet (388 m), and a volume of 43,984 acre-feet (54,253,000 m^{3}). When filled to maximum capacity, it has a surface elevation of 1,294 feet (394 m) and a volume of 131,078 acre-feet (161,682,000 m^{3}).

The streambed underlying the reservoir has an elevation of 1,225 feet (373 m).

== Infrastructure ==
Council Grove Dam is a rolled earth-fill embankment dam that stands 96 feet (29 m) above the streambed and 6,500 feet (2,000 m) long. At its crest, the dam has an elevation of 1,321 feet (403 m). An uncontrolled, 500-foot (150 m) wide spillway is located at the southwest end of the dam. It has a maximum flow capacity of 49,400 cubic feet per second (1,400 m^{3}/s). Additional outlet works include a 17-foot (5.2 m) wide conduit and a 24-inch (61 cm) wide low-flow outlet. At the top of the flood control pool, these outlet works have a flow capacity of 11,400 cubic feet per second (320 m^{3}/s). The Neosho River channel below the dam has a capacity of 3,100 cubic feet per second (88 m^{3}/s).

== Management ==
The Tulsa District of the U.S. Army Corps of Engineers manages Council Grove Dam and Reservoir for the purposes of flood control, recreation, water quality control, and water supply. The Corps oversees recreational activities both on the reservoir surface and in the parks on its shore. The Kansas Department of Wildlife, Parks and Tourism (KDWP) manages approximately 2,000 acres (8.1 km^{2}) of land around the reservoir's northern ends as the Council Grove Wildlife Area.

== Parks and recreation ==
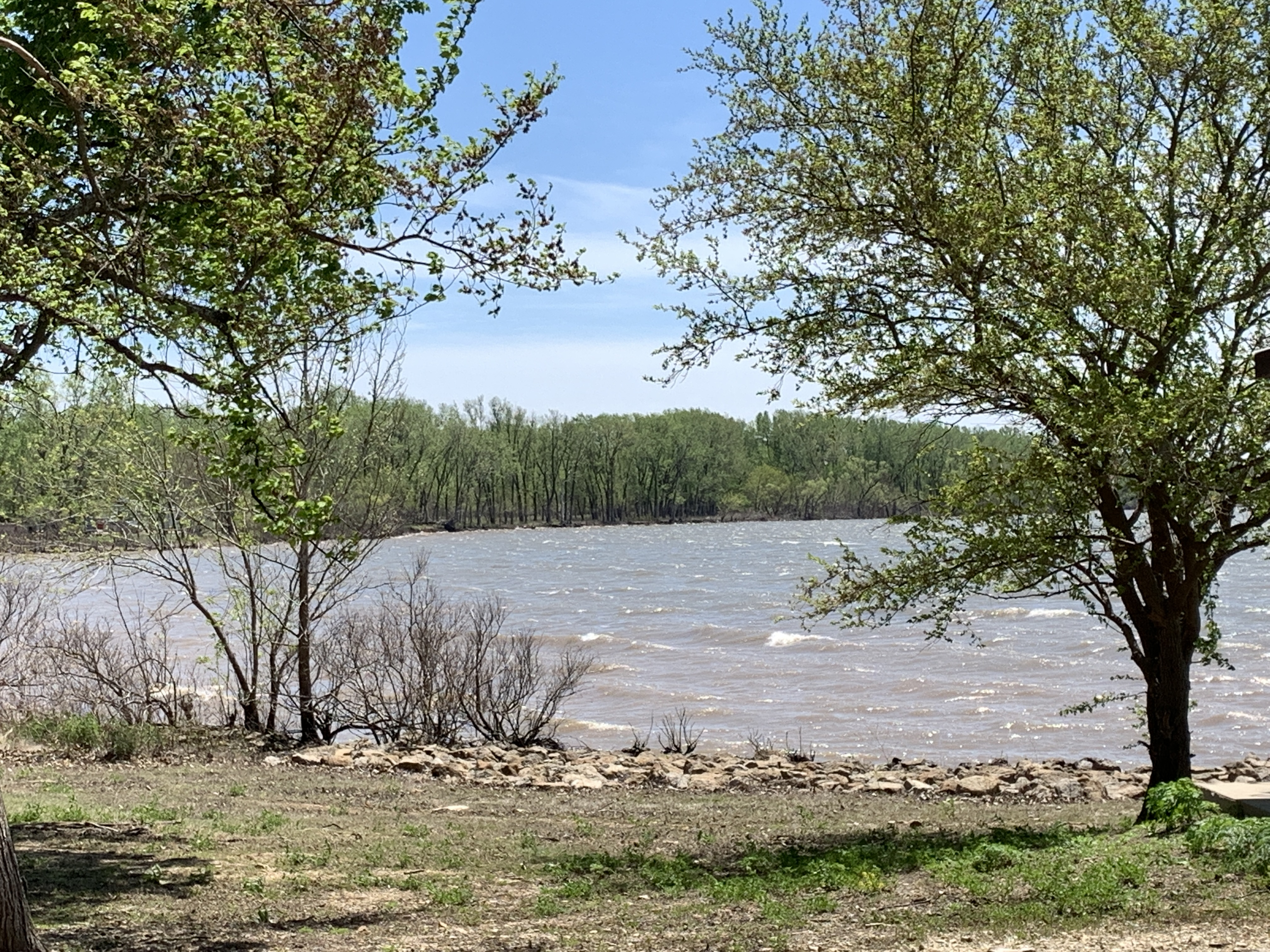
View of the lake from a Richey Cove campsite

The Corps of Engineers manages eight parks at the reservoir: Canning Creek Cove, Santa Fe Trail, Marina Cove, and Neosho Park on the southwest shore and Custer Park, Kit Carson Cove, Richey Cove, and Kansa View on the eastern shore. All eight parks include campgrounds, and all but Kansa View host boat ramps. Canning Creek Cove, Neosho Park, and Richey Cove have hiking trails. Council Grove Lake's one swimming beach is at Richey Cove.

Council Grove Lake is open for sport-fishing. Hunting is allowed, with restrictions in some areas, on the public land around the reservoir.

== Wildlife ==
Fish species resident in the lake include black bass, channel and flathead catfish, crappie, saugeye, white bass, and wiper. One invasive species, the zebra mussel, is also present.

Game animals living on land around the reservoir include doves, quail, rabbits, squirrels, turkeys, and white-tailed deer.

== See also ==
- List of Kansas state parks
- List of lakes, reservoirs, and dams in Kansas
- List of rivers of Kansas
