= Big Basin Prairie Preserve =

Protected area in Kansas, United States

- IUCN category IV (habitat/species management area)
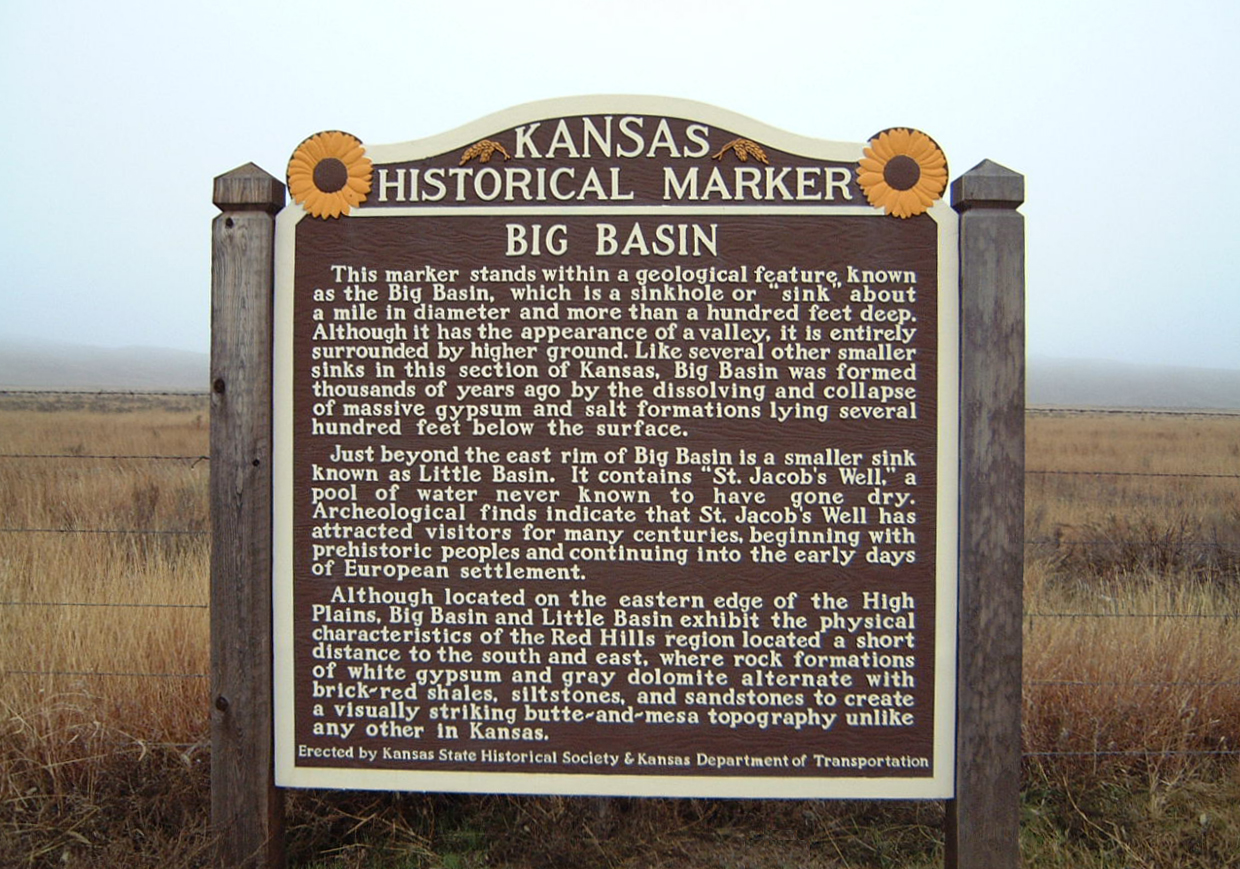
- Kansas Historical Marker

- Location within Kansas
- Location: Clark County, Kansas, USA
- Nearest city: Ashland
- Coordinates: 37°14′25″N 099°59′51″W
- Area: 1,818 acres (736 ha)
- Established: 1978
- Operator: Kansas Department of Wildlife and Parks
- Website: http://www.kdwp.state.ks.us/news/KDWP-Info/Locations/Wildlife-Areas/Region-3/Big-Basin-Prairie-Preserve KDWP

U.S. National Natural Landmark

The Big Basin Prairie Preserve is a 1,818 acres (7.36 km^{2}; 2.84 sq mi) nature preserve owned and managed by the Kansas Department of Wildlife and Parks. The preserve is in the Red Hills near Ashland in Clark County, Kansas. The main features are St. Jacob's Well, (37.2403666, -99.9818588) a water-filled sinkhole which lies in the Little Basin, and the Big Basin, a lush mile-wide crater-like depression, also resulting from a sinkhole. The area is stocked with buffalo and is open to the public.

The Big Basin is transected by U.S. Route 283 and U.S. Route 160 which run together for a short ways. The portion of the basin west of the highway is privately owned. The property was acquired in 1974 from The Nature Conservancy which made operation as a nature preserve a condition of the sale. In December 1978, the preserve was designated as a National Natural Landmark and was added to the National Registry of Natural Landmarks.

Elevations on the preserve range from 2,200 feet (670 m) to 2,360 feet (720 m) above sea level.

== History ==
The area was one of the locations where the Northern Cheyenne camped and rested during the Northern Cheyenne Exodus in the fall of 1878. The area was not occupied, and perhaps not even generally known, by settlers at that time. The Big Basin was also used as a landmark and watering site for trail drives of cattle northward from Texas to railroads in Kansas.

Willard D. Johnson of the United States Geological Survey visited Big Basin at the turn of the 20th century and published the following account in 1901:

Within this zone, 19 miles east of Meade, is Big Basin, approximately circular, about a mile in diameter and 100 feet in depth. It has no drainage out, and drainage into it frequently results in shallow ponding at various low areas over the floor. Notching the rim at the southwest is a smaller basin, also without outlet, and separated from the larger one by a low divide. A short distance to the east is still another, called Little Basin, and on the rim of this is a sharply cut sink hole, St. Jacob's Well. Here, again, the water plane of the ground water is revealed. The floor of Little Basin, close to the foot of its encircling bluff, shows a number of shallow depressions, apparently the nearly healed scars of other and earlier sink holes. St. Jacob's Well has every appearance of having been rather recently formed.

Research has determined that St Jacob's Well is 84 ft (26 m) wide and 58 ft (18 m) deep. It has never been known to go dry.

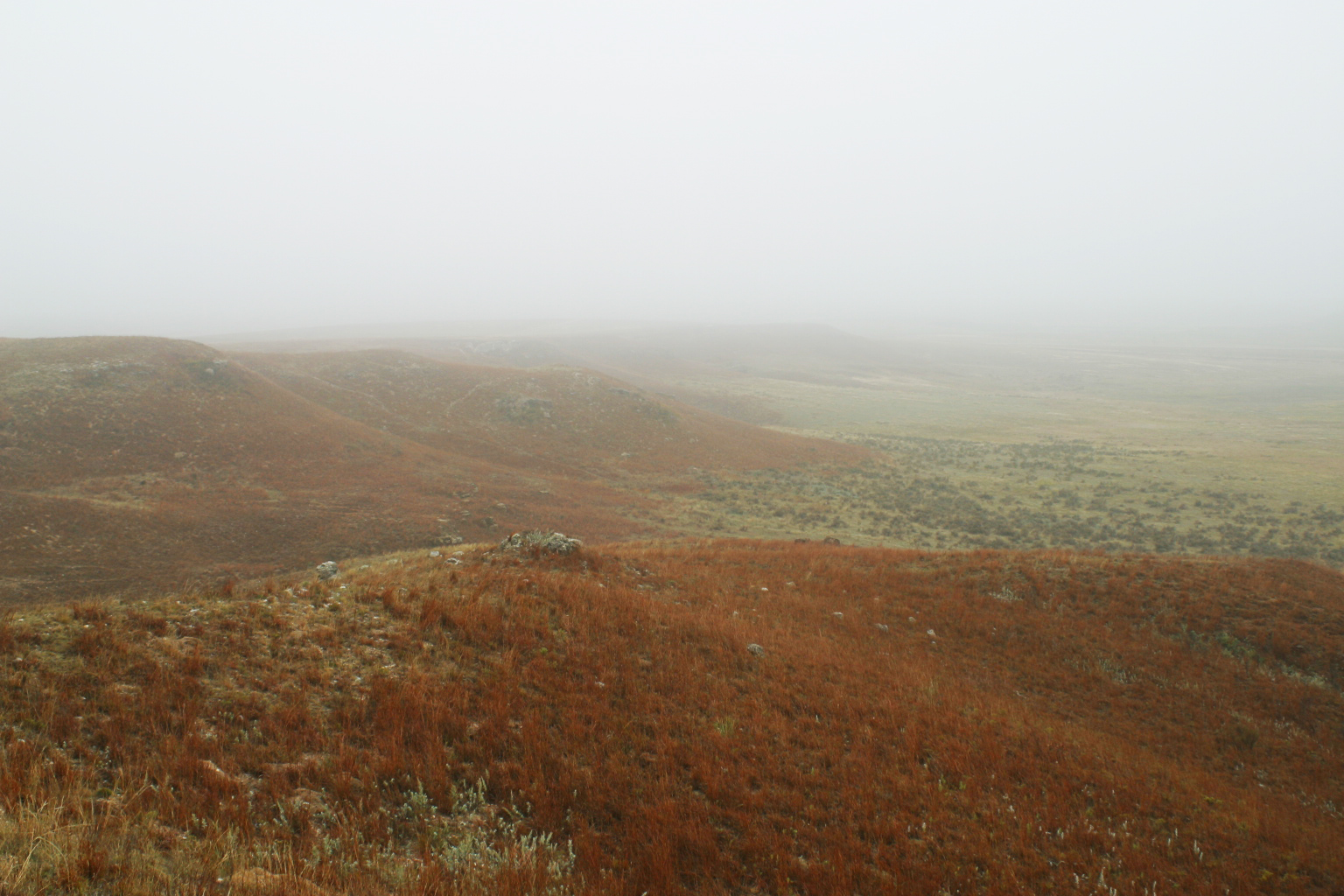
Big Basin in the fog.

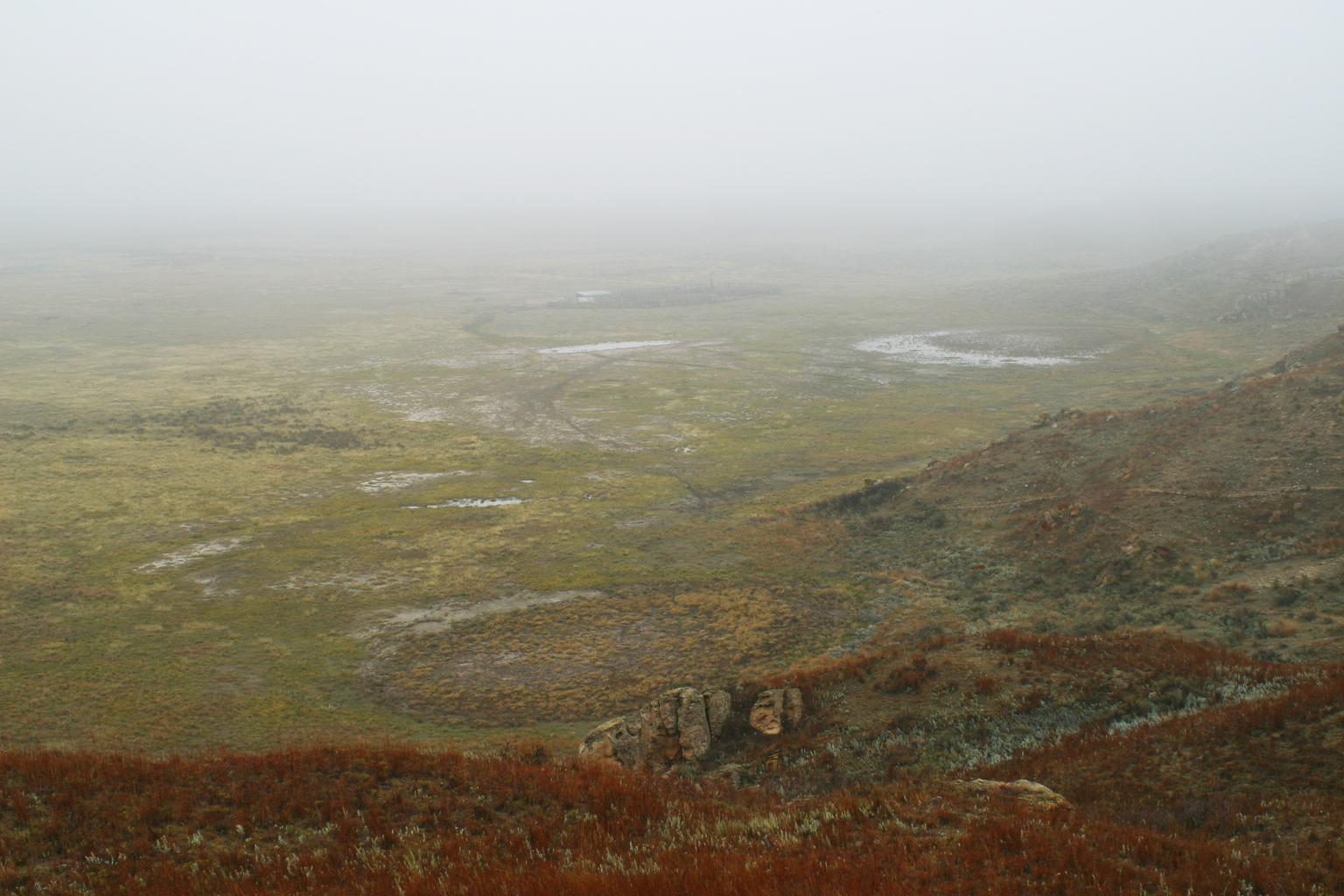
The wet floor of Big Basin.

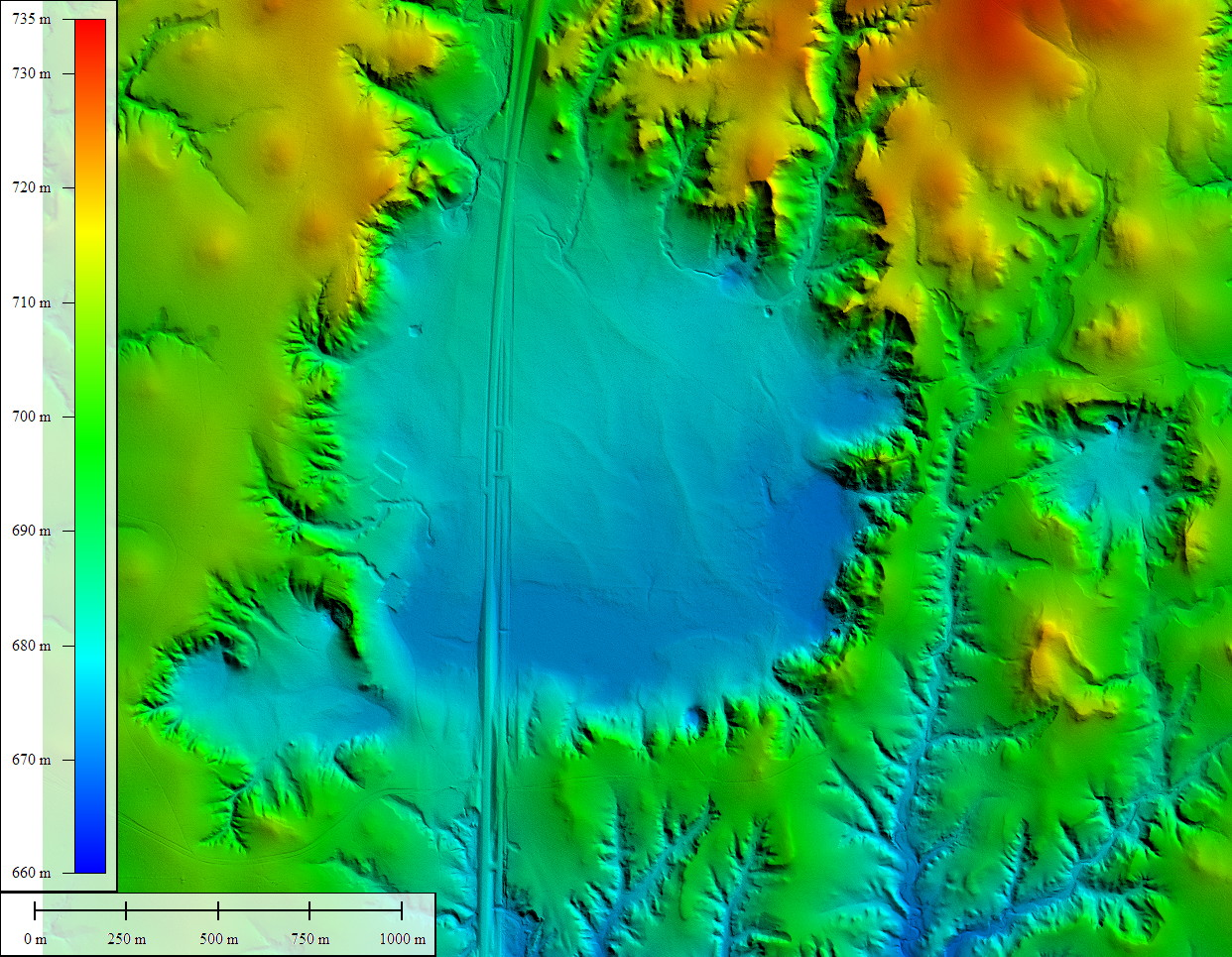
Shaded elevation map.

The effort to preserve the land now known as the Big Basin Prairie Preserve began in 1972 when Mrs. C.G. "Janie" Stein, formed the Big Basin Foundation and contacted and worked closely with numerous agencies, congressional representatives, and individuals over several years. She worked with local landowners and The Nature Conservancy to encourage setting this land aside to protect bison and pronghorn. Her son John Paul Stein wrote a song about his mother's involvement in this project.

== See also ==
- List of protected grasslands of North America
- List of sinkholes of the United States
