= Slough Creek (Morris County, Kansas) =

Stream in Morris County, Kansas, U.S.

Coordinates: 38.6986178°N 96.5297257°W

Slough Creek is a stream in Morris County, Kansas, in the United States. It flows to Council Grove Lake.

The name is descriptive for the creek's "sloughy" appearance.

== See also ==
- List of rivers of Kansas
