= Henry Inman (U.S. Army officer and author) =

American military figure and writer

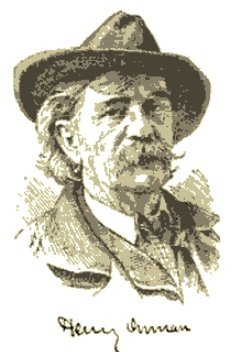

Henry Inman (July 30, 1837 – November 13, 1899) was an American soldier, frontiersman, and author. He served the military during the Indian campaigns and the American Civil War, having earned distinction for gallantry on the battlefield. He was commissioned lieutenant general during the Indian wars. He settled in Kansas and worked as a journalist and author of short stories and books of the plains and western frontier. He was a friend and associate of Buffalo Bill and served under General Custer.

== Early life ==
Inman was born in New York City on July 30, 1837. (Note: His date of birth is also stated as July 3, 1837.) His parents were Henry Inman, an artist and president of the National Academy of Design, and Janet Riker (née O'Brien) Inman. His brother, John O'Brien Inman, was also an artist. Henry Inman was educated in public schools in Brooklyn, New York. His father died when he was a child and he was raised by his mother in Hempstead on Long Island for about five years before going away to the Athenian Academy in Rathway, New Jersey. He also received college preparation from tutors.

== Frontier ==
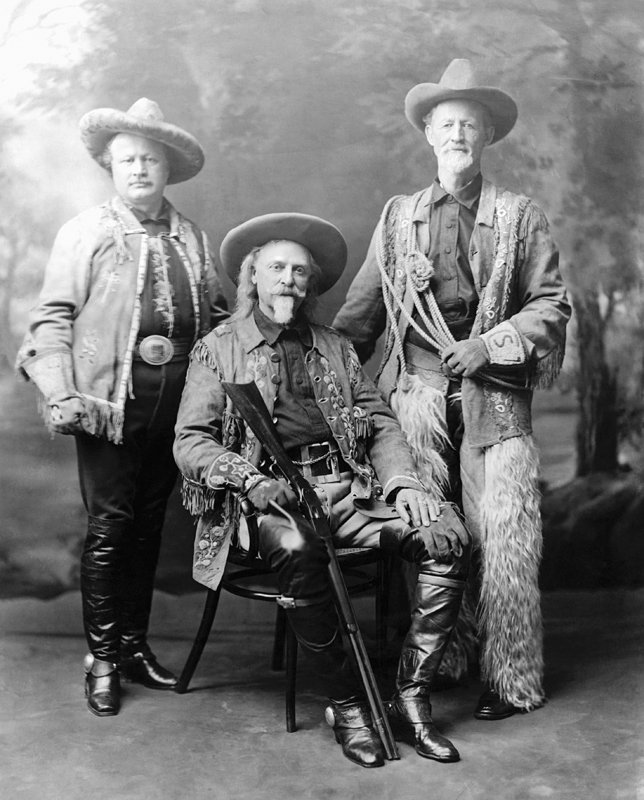
Pawnee Bill, Buffalo Bill, and Buffalo Jones. Inman had Old Santa Fe Trail published and The Great Salt Lake Trail co-authored with Buffalo Bill. Buffalo Jones was the subject and co-author of the book Buffalo Jones.

As a young man, Inman traveled west and met Buffalo Bill Cody. He scouted with Cody, fought with him on the frontier, and often rode with him during the parades of Cody's Wild West shows. He also knew many Native American chiefs. He found the skeleton of a Cheyenne person in Ness County, Kansas, that he donated to a museum in Kansas.

== Military service ==
Inman joined the army in 1857 and served during the Indian campaign in the 9th Infantry Regiment in Oregon and California. He served in the 17th Infantry Regiment during the American Civil War beginning in 1861 and was commissioned a second lieutenant by October 1861. He was an aide-de-camp to General George Sykes of the Fifth Corps. In Richmond, he fought in the Seven Days Battles and suffered severe wounds. He was brevetted for gallantry in action. At the end of his service, he was a captain and brevett major.

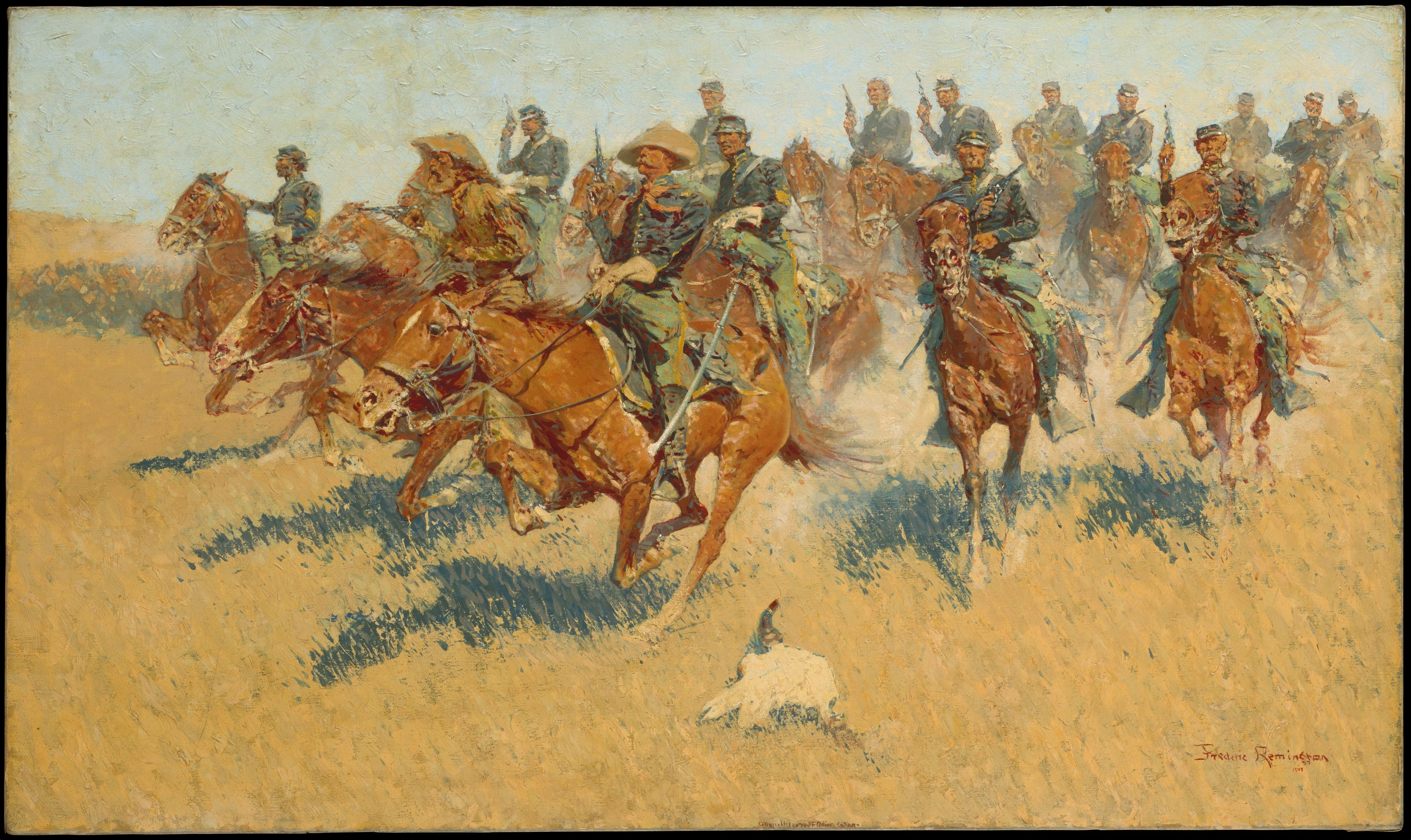
Frederic Remington, Cavalry Charge on the Southern Plains, 1907, Metropolitan Museum of Art

He was made lieutenant-colonel for his service during the 1868-1869 Indian winter campaign in Kansas under General Philip Sheridan, although the commission never appeared in his official record. During the Indian wars, he also served under Generals George Armstrong Custer, Alfred Sully, and Alfred Gibbs. Stationed at Fort Harker as a paymaster, he was tried for embezzlement and other financial issues 1870 to 1872 and was dismissed as a result of what may have been largely carelessness. He was called Major Henry Inman and Colonel Henry Inman.

== Journalist and author ==
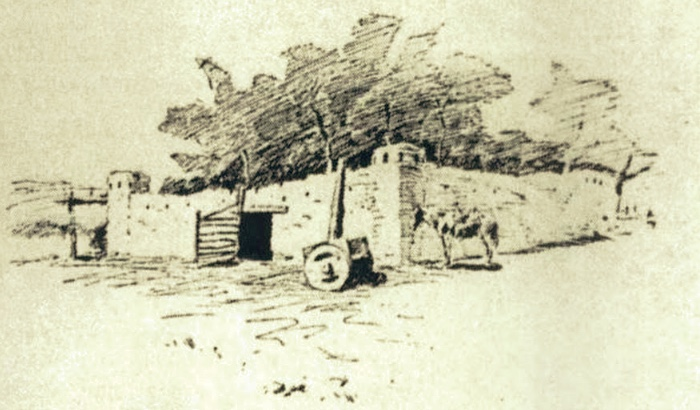
Colonel Henry Inman, Mexican Ranch, published in The Old Santa Fe Trail, 1897

In 1878, he began working as a journalist for the Larned Enterprise, also called the Larned Chronoscope, and was the editor of six newspapers.

He wrote of his adventures on the plains. His short stories were printed in magazines and newspapers. He wrote about his experiences on the plains and the western frontier, including Stories of the Old Santa Fe Trail. One of his books was written with Buffalo Bill, The Great Salt Lake Trail. Buffalo Bill was named as co-author because Inman used a number of quotes from Cody's autobiographical book, Story of the Wild West. Inman's book, The Old Santa Fe Trail is also said to contain content from Buffalo Bill's autobiography. He also wrote A Pioneer from Kentucky, The Delahoydes, Tales of the Trail, The Ranch on the Ox-hide, and Buffalo Jones. At the time of his death, three books were being published, The Cruise of the Prairie Schooner, Muriel, the Colonel's Daughter, and Pick Smith, the Scout.

== Personal life ==
He married Eunice Churchill Dyer (1842–1922), the daughter of a shipbuilder, in Portland, Maine on October 22, 1862. They had a son and two daughters. He was the father of Brigadier General Robert Todd Inman. While in the hospital he met a homeless boy who was blind, he took him in and the two were constant companions. He lived a great deal of his life in Kansas, first in military posts, then settling in Larned and then the Auburndale neighborhood of Topeka. Inman died on November 13, 1899, in Topeka, Kansas and was buried at Ellsworth Cemetery.

He was said to have looked like his friend Buffalo Bill when they were together. Lake Inman and the nearby town of Inman, Kansas, were named for him. He was on the board of directors of the Kansas Historical Society.
