= Red Hills (Kansas) =

Physiographic region in Kansas, United States

Coordinates: 37.34169°N 99.079551°W

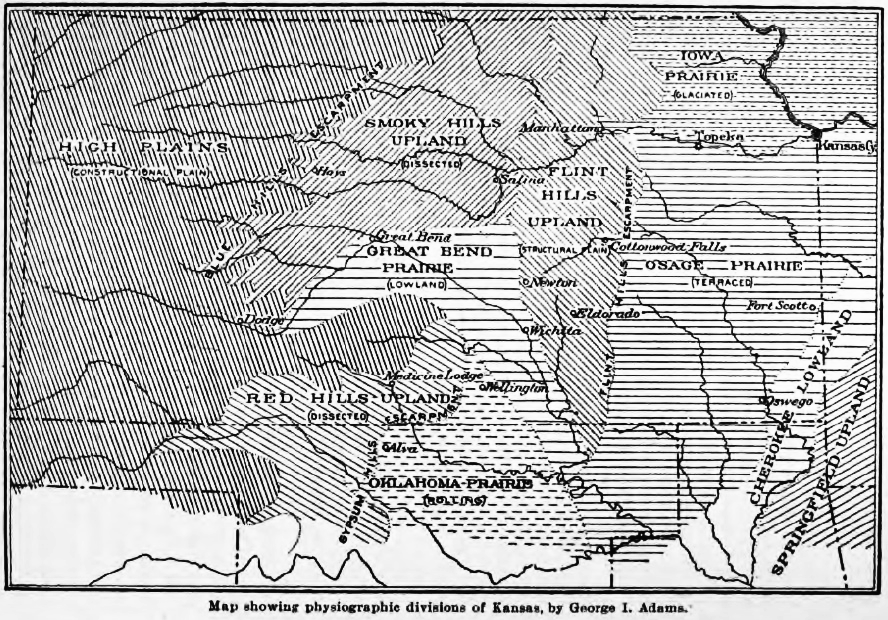
Map showing physiographic divisions of Kansas and northern Oklahoma

The Red Hills, also referred to as Gypsum Hills, is the name of a physiographic region located mostly in Clark, Comanche and Barber counties in southern and central Kansas. This undulating terrain of red-tinted sediments, a product of the underlying geology, does not fit the conventional description of the Great Plains landscape of Kansas.

The red bed sediments of the Red Hills were deposited in an arid continental closed basin that formed within the Pangaean supercontinent during the Permian Period. Water often flooded this basin forming ephemeral playas of somewhat acidic waters. The shallow playas were intermittently flooded then dried leaving a mixture of lacustrine sediments and gypsum evaporites. The red color derives from the oxidation of iron contained within the deposits.

The region is also known as the Gypsum Hills, because of the large natural deposits of gypsum in this area. The dissolution of underlying gypsum beds has led to the formation of sinkholes which are common features within the Red Hills region. Big Basin and Little Basin are two well-known sinkholes in western Clark County.

The Red Hills have scenic vistas and some small steep canyons. High points include Mount Nebo (2,441 feet (744 m)), Mount Jesus (2,340 feet (710 m)) and Mount Lookout (2,320 feet (710 m)), in Clark County, Kansas.

== See also ==
- Big Basin Prairie Preserve
- Tallgrass Prairie National Preserve
- Flint Hills
