= Crawford State Park (Kansas) =

State park in Kansas, United States

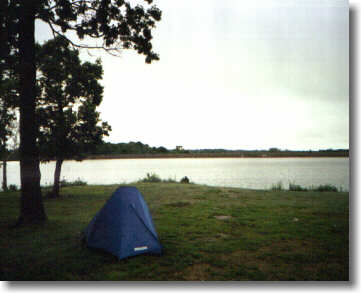

- Location within Kansas Location within the United States
- Interactive map of Crawford State Park
- Location: Crawford County, Kansas, United States
- Coordinates: 37°38′12″N 94°48′48″W
- Area: 500 acres (200 ha)
- Elevation: 994 ft (303 m)
- Established: 1965
- Administrator: Kansas Department of Wildlife and Parks
- Visitors: 332,880 (in 2022)
- Website: Official website
- Kansas State Parks

Crawford State Park is a state park in Crawford County, Kansas, United States, located 9 miles (14 km) north of Girard.

The 500-acre (200 ha) park, resides on a 150-acre (61 ha) lake built by the Civilian Conservation Corps (CCC) in the 1930s. There are two recorded archaeological sites within the park's boundaries, including remnants of a 19th-century U.S. military outpost. An interpretive trail connects the park with the Kansas Department of Wildlife and Parks' Farlington Fish Hatchery, which was built shortly after the CCC completed construction of the lake.

Crawford State Park is known as a fishing destination for channel catfish, crappie, and striped bass. Boating and scuba diving are also popular in the park.

Located on the edge of the Ozarks, Crawford State Park features numerous redbud trees.

== See also ==
- List of lakes, reservoirs, and dams in Kansas
- List of rivers of Kansas
