= Almena Diversion Dam =

- Country: United States
- Location: Norton, Kansas
- Coordinates: title' 39°45′59″N 100°06′01″W
- Purpose: Flood control
- Status: Operational

The Almena Diversion Dam is a reinforced concrete ogee overflow weir located 8 miles northeast of Norton, Kansas long the valley of Prairie Dog Creek and about 11 miles downstream of Norton Dam.
