= Lake Vaquero =

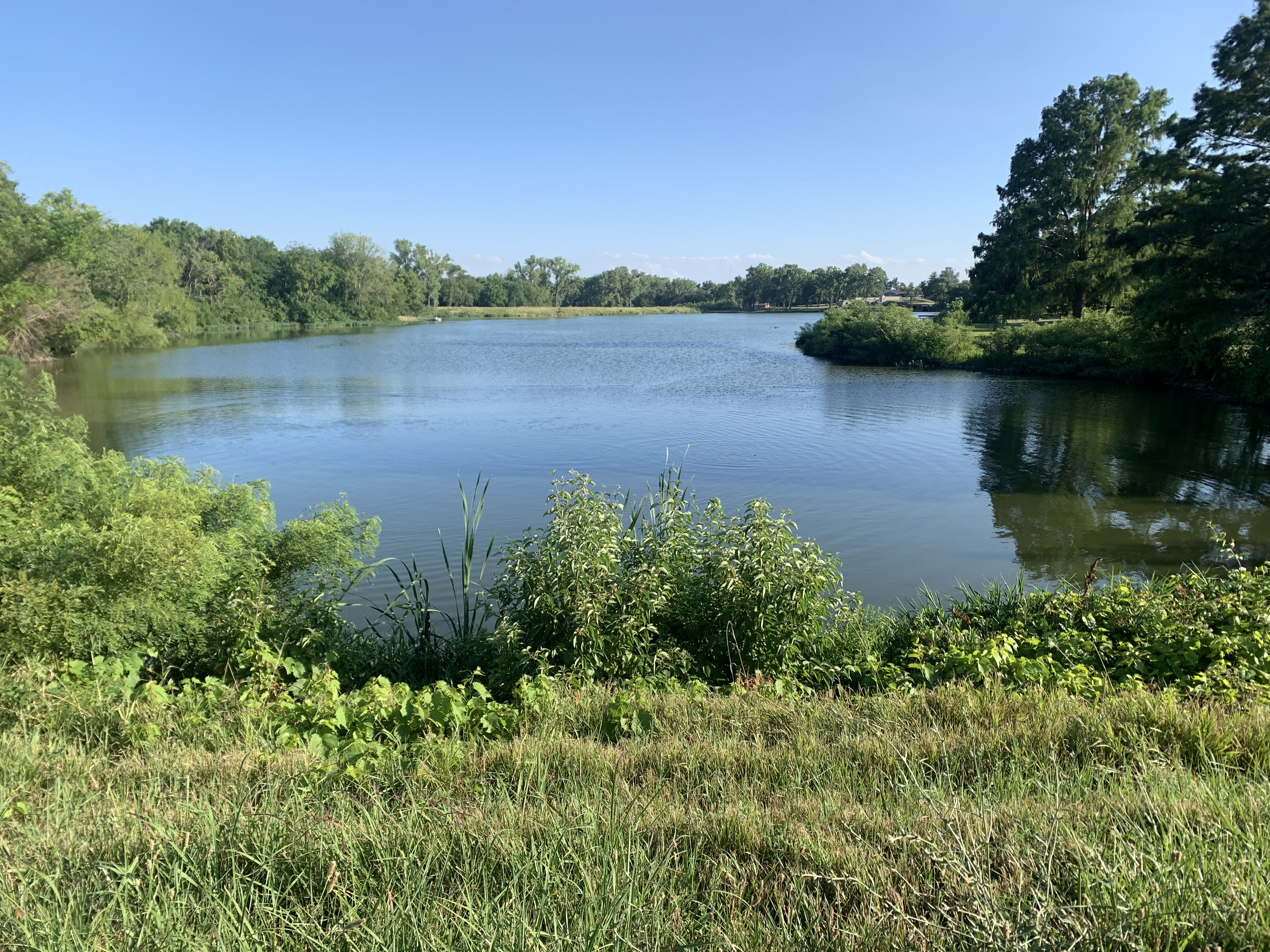
- Lake Vaquero in central Mission Township, facing south (2025)

- Location within Kansas Location within the United States
- Location: Shawnee County, Kansas
- Coordinates: 39°00′39″N 95°48′04″W
- Lake type: reservoir
- Primary inflows: Shunganunga Creek
- Surface area: 30.3 acres (12 ha)
- Surface elevation: 1,004 ft (306 m)
- Settlements: just southwest of Topeka, Kansas

Lake Vaquero is a private lake located two blocks southwest of Topeka, Kansas, and about three blocks northwest of Lake Sherwood. It is a manmade lake contained by a 33 ft (10 m) high dam on its southeast. It is bounded by Indian Hills Road on the east, El Cerrito Drive on the south, Lagito Drive on the west and SW 29th Street on the north. Lake Vaquero's surface area is 30.3 acres (12 ha). If filled to its maximum capacity, the lake would contain 778-acre-foot (960,000 m^{3}), though its typical volume is 361-acre-foot (445,000 m^{3}).

Lake Vaquero was constructed by King & Associates Engineering and was completed in 1963. In 2010, it was determined that upgrades to the dam were necessary for achieving higher safety standards. The rehabilitation took place in 2014. Today, the lake is surrounded by private residences with no public access.
