= Neosho State Fishing Lake =

- Lake McKinley
- Location within Kansas Location within the United States
- Location: Neosho County, Kansas
- Coordinates: 37°25′26″N 95°11′58″W
- Type: artificial lake
- Basin countries: United States
- Surface area: 92 acres (37 ha)
- Surface elevation: 902 ft (275 m)

Neosho State Fishing Lake, also known as Lake McKinley, is located in the state of Kansas. Located in Neosho County 5 miles (8.0 km) north on highway 59 and 4 miles (6.4 km) east on 40th Rd from the city of Parsons, Kansas, United States. Construction of this lake was completed in 1927. The lake covers 92 acres (370,000 m^{2}) of water. There are 124 public use acres surrounding the lake. Fishing, camping, and picnicking are popular activities. The park has a shelter house, fishing piers, picnic tables, barbecue grills and vault toilets. Below Lake McKinley dam is a catch and release youth fishing pond for anglers age 15 and under when with an accompanying adult. The lake is operated by the Kansas Department of Wildlife and Parks.

The lake was named for Marshall Coleman McKinley, a conservationist and resident of Parsons who served as president of the local chapter of the Izaak Walton League and who successfully petitioned the Kansas State Fish, Game and Forestry Commission (now the Kansas Department of Wildlife and Parks) to construct the lake and establish a fish hatchery there.
