= Lake Jivaro =

Reservoir in eastern Kansas

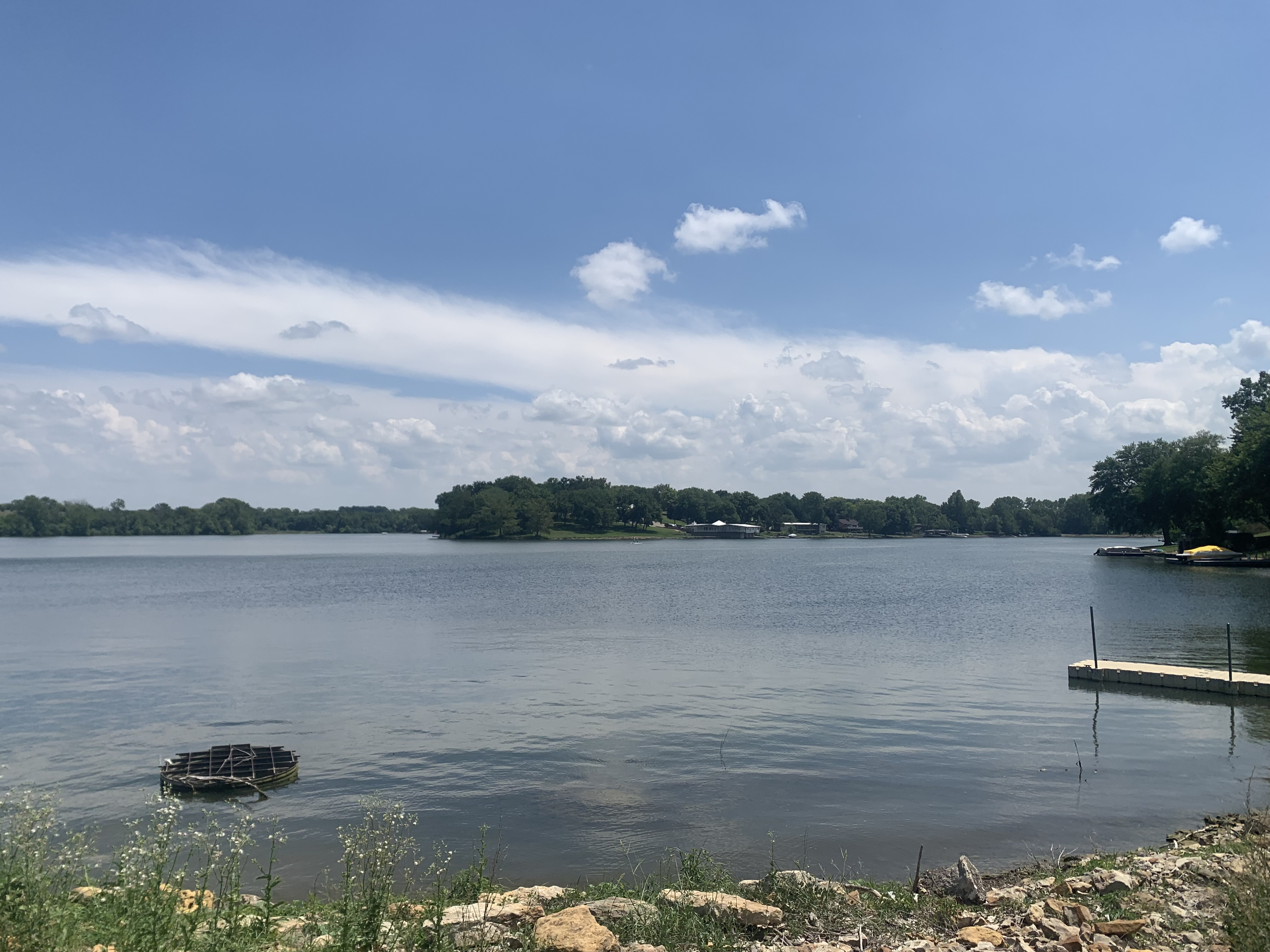
- Lake Jivaro in southern Tecumseh Township, facing south (2025)

- Location within Kansas Location within the United States
- Location: Shawnee County, Kansas
- Coordinates: 39°00′27″N 95°33′06″W
- Type: manmade reservoir freshwater lake
- Basin countries: United States
- Max. length: 1.3 mi (2.1 km)
- Max. width: 1 mi (1.6 km)
- Surface area: 97.7 acres (40 ha)
- Max. depth: 35 ft (11 m)
- Surface elevation: 1,010 ft (310 m)

Lake Jivaro is a private man-made reservoir lake in southeast Shawnee County, Kansas. Constructed in the early 1960s, it lies just east of Shawnee Heights Road. The dam responsible for the lake is at the north end; the lake has roughly the shape of a doubly-rooted tooth. The lake has a 97.7-acre (395,000 m^{2}) surface area. Its shore is lined with residences along about half of the shoreline.

Lake Jivaro has a community boat ramp at its northeast corner, at the west end of the dam. It being private property, use requires explicit permission, and the Lake lacks public boat ramps. There are also no public swimming areas, and all fishing requires explicit permission. Two websites attribute bass, walleye, bluegill, white perch, and crappie to its waters.
