= Kansas Department of Wildlife, Parks =

State agency in Kansas, United States

Coordinates: 39.045631°N 95.675873°W

Kansas Department of Wildlife and Parks (KDWP)

Agency overview
- Jurisdiction: Kansas
- Headquarters: 1020 S. Kansas Topeka, Kansas
- Employees: 420
- Agency executive: Brad Loveless, Secretary of Wildlife and Parks
- Parent agency: State of Kansas
- Website: KDWP Website

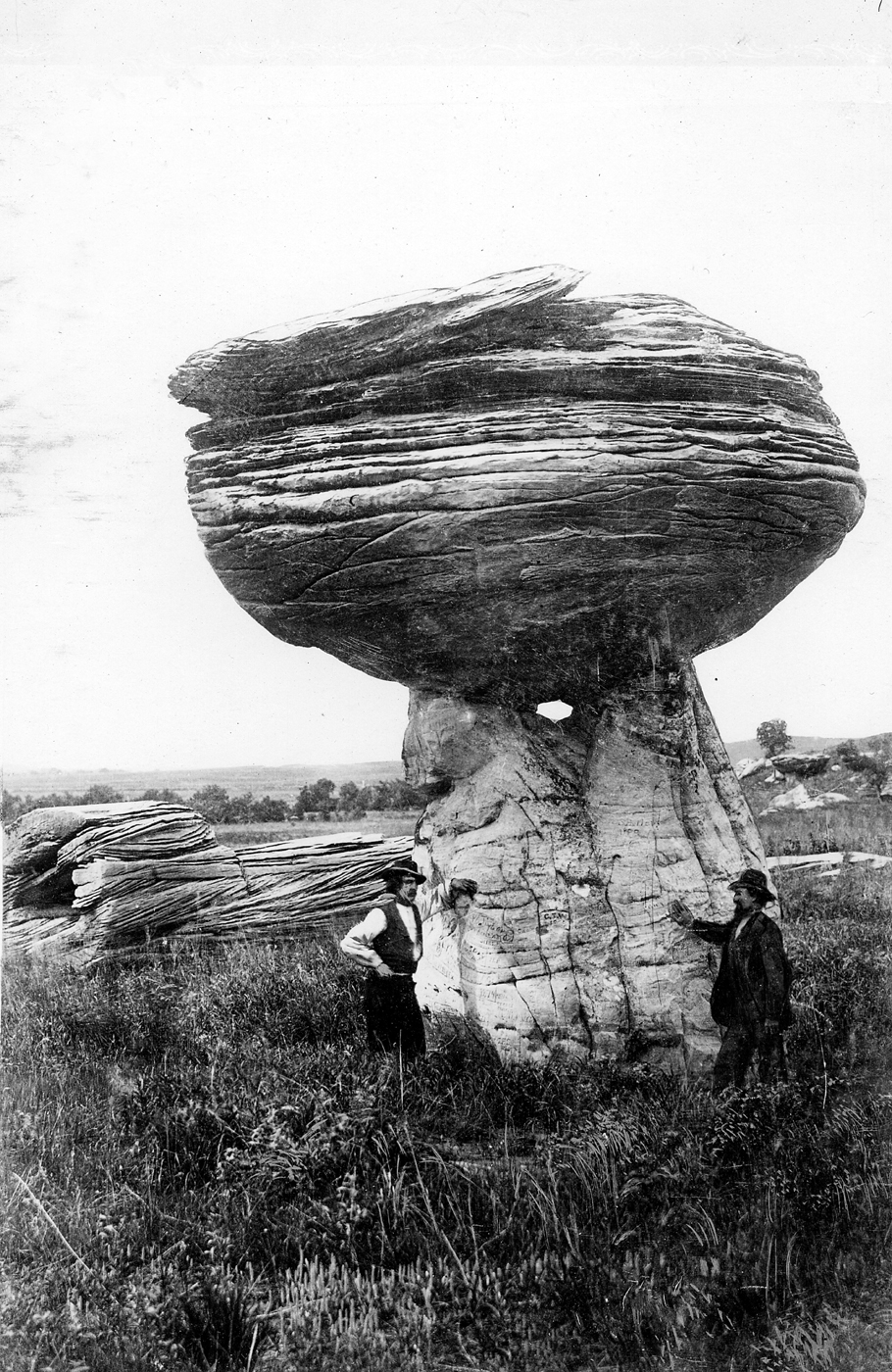
Rock formation at Mushroom Rock State Park, Kansas (1916)

The Kansas Department of Wildlife and Parks (KDWP) is a state cabinet-level agency led by a Secretary of Wildlife and Parks appointed by the Governor of Kansas. The Office of the Secretary is located in Topeka, the state capital of Kansas. A seven-member, bipartisan commission, also appointed by the Governor, advises the Secretary and approves regulations governing outdoor recreation and fish and wildlife resources in Kansas. KDWP employs approximately 420 full-time employees in five divisions: Executive Services, Administrative Services, Fisheries and Wildlife, Law Enforcement, and Parks. At full staffing, KDWP has 163 state officers spanning 3 divisions: Law Enforcement Division (Kansas Game Wardens), Parks Division, Public Lands Division.

== History ==
Fish and game laws were first organized in the state of Kansas in the form of the Kansas Fish and Game Department in 1905. In 1911, State Fish and Game Department was placed under supervision of the University of Kansas Board of Regents. Another reorganization occurred in 1925 when the Fish and Game Department became the Kansas Forestry, Fish and Game Commission, consisting of three members appointed by the Governor. In 1978, the Forestry part was dropped from the name. The agency became known as the Kansas Fish and Game Commission. Finally in 1987, Governor Mike Hayden signed an executive order merging the State Park and Resources Authority and the Kansas Fish and Game Commission to form the Kansas Department of Wildlife and Parks. On July 1, 2011, the Division of Travel and Tourism was officially transferred from the Department of Commerce to the Kansas Department of Wildlife and Parks. The agency then became known as the Kansas Department of Wildlife, Parks, and Tourism (KDWPT). However, Kansas Tourism was reverted to the Department of Commerce by an executive reorganization order on July 1, 2021, which then triggered the department's name to revert to Kansas Department of Wildlife and Parks (KDWP).

== Responsibilities ==
The Kansas Department of Wildlife and Parks (KDWP) is responsible for the following:

=== State parks ===
- Cedar Bluff State Park
- Cheney State Park
- Clinton State Park
- Crawford State Park
- Cross Timbers State Park
- Eisenhower State Park
- El Dorado State Park
- Elk City State Park
- Fall River State Park
- Ford County State Park
- Glen Elder State Park
- Hillsdale State Park
- Kanopolis State Park
- Kaw River State Park
- Lake Scott State Park
- Lovewell State Park
- Meade State Park
- Milford State Park
- Mushroom Rock State Park
- Perry State Park
- Pomona State Park
- Prairie Dog State Park
- Prairie Spirit Trail State Park
- Sand Hills State Park
- Tuttle Creek State Park
- Webster State Park
- Wilson State Park

=== Nature preserves and fishing lakes ===
- Atchison State Fishing Lake
- Big Basin Prairie Preserve
- Lake Afton
- Leavenworth County State Lake
- McPherson Valley Wetlands
- Maxwell Wildlife Refuge
- Mined Land Wildlife Area
- Neosho State Fishing Lake
- Ottawa State Fishing Lake

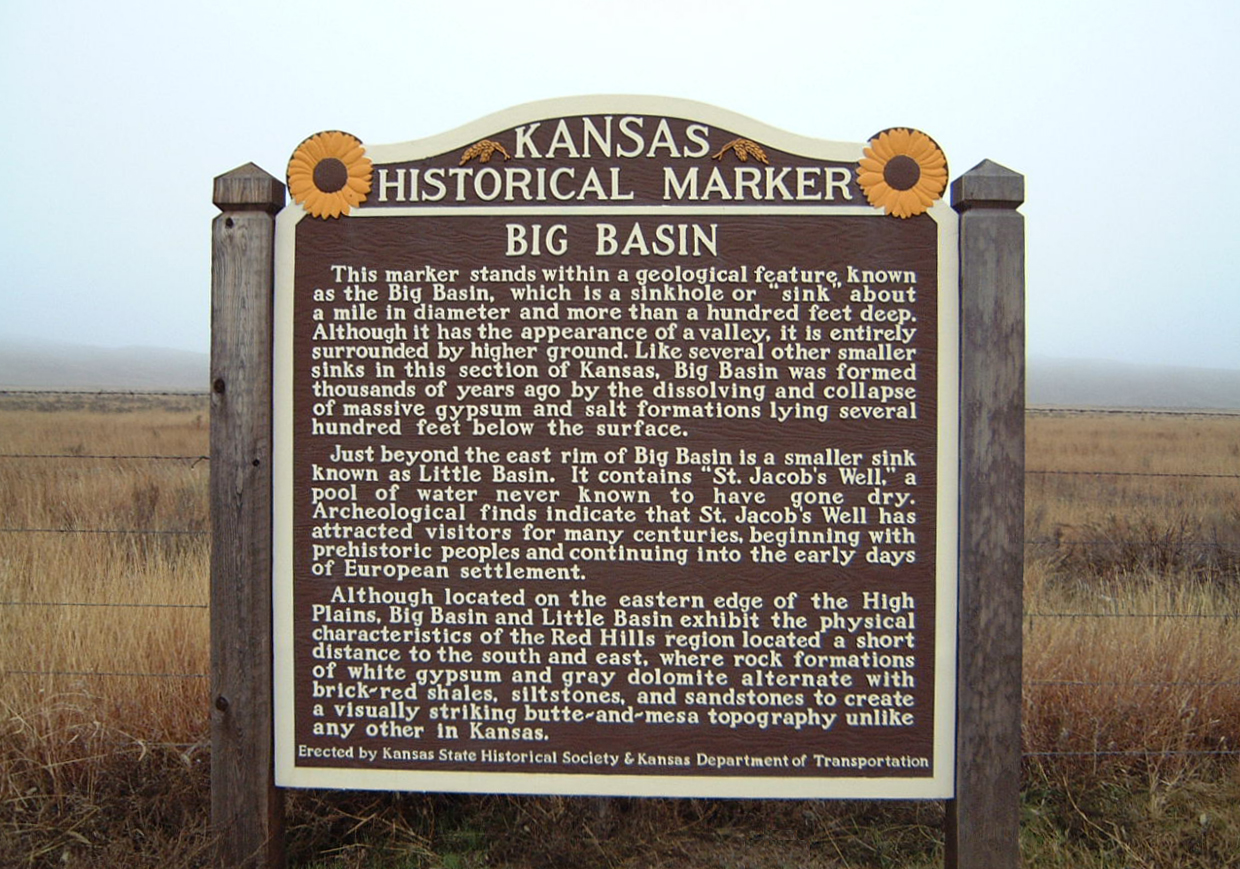
Kansas Historical Marker at Big Basin Prairie Preserve

== Law Enforcement Division ==
KDWP employs a number of Kansas Game Wardens (Law Enforcement Division), who are fully certified and commissioned state law enforcement officers, stationed across the state in numerous locations. These Wardens patrol their regions, enforcing state law. They specialize in fish/game and boating law enforcement but also routinely deal with other violations that they may encounter. They have full authority to enforce all state statutes and have statewide jurisdiction. Many times KDWPT Game Wardens work with other law enforcement agencies such as the Kansas Highway Patrol and local sheriff or police departments.

Game Wardens are usually issued the .45 Auto Glock 21 as the sidearm of choice for the agency. As of 2022, Game Wardens are using the Glock Model 21 Gen 4 .45 Auto sidearm. In 2010, the department began issuing the Wardens AR-15 patrol rifles manufactured by Stag Arms, in .223 caliber. Prior to 2010, they were issued military loan/leased M-14 rifles in .308 caliber.

=== Line of duty deaths ===
The KDWP's Law Enforcement Division has lost four officers over its history.

| Name | End of watch | Location | Cause |
|---|---|---|---|
| John H. Cox | 1916-12-05 | Shawnee County | Gunfire |
| Fred W. Tierney | 1925-01-12 | Wilburton | Gunfire during investigation |
| Elmer Leon Nonnast | 1974-05-08 | Near Arkansas river | Heart attack during foot pursuit |
| Luke Douglas Nihart | 2010-06-26 | Tuttle Creek State Park | Vehicle accident |

=== History ===
In 2004, A Kansas Game Warden shot a suspect during a police hunt. KBI agent Bruce Mellor said the incident began when officers with the Goodland Police Department and the Sherman County Sheriff's Office tried to apprehend two men. Officers called a Kansas Wildlife and Parks Officer for help during the altercation. One of the men was shot by a Kansas Game Warden after he reportedly approached the Game Warden with a knife.

In 2012, Kansas Game Warden Hal Kaina received the Shikar-Safari Wildlife Officer of the Year award for the state of Kansas. This award is issued to one Wildlife Officer in each state every calendar year.

In 2015, Kansas Game Wardens Hal Kaina and Greg Salisbury both received the award of merit; Kaina for his investigation that led to the arrest of a person stealing copper wire from agricultural irrigation systems. Fellow warden Salisbury was honored for his actions at a house fire in rural Ottawa County.

The Kansas Department of Wildlife and Parks made international headlines when game warden Tanner Dixson shot an illegally kept pet deer five times and killed it in front of the family who had cared for it for the past 22 months. Taryn Mcgaughey, who cared for Faline the deer with her parents, Mark and Kim Mcgaughey, filmed the incident. The video of the deer being slaughtered by Dixson outraged people around the world and resulted in petitions demanding that Tanner Dixson be terminated. However, the Kansas Department of Wildlife and Parks took no action against Tanner Dixson. Several individuals that knew Dixson growing up in Greensburg, Kansas have come forth to say that Tanner Dixson is a well-known bully from their high-school years, and they were not surprised to learn that he had shot a pet deer in front of a family. KDWP does not recommend breaking the law; doing such will prevent situations like this from happening.

In 2016, Kansas Game Warden Hal Kaina received a Lifesaving Award from KDWPT law enforcement division for his efforts in two incidents where individuals were facing life-threatening circumstances. In one incident, Warden Kaina rescued a hunter who had broken through the ice while hunting at Marion reservoir. In another incident, Warden Kaina aided in the rescue of four individuals floating in the water, including children, after their boat sank in the middle of Marion reservoir.

In February 2017, the Kansas Department of Wildlife and Parks made national headlines when Game Warden Lynn Koch fired his .45 caliber handgun at the antlers of two buck deer that were entangled together by their antlers to successfully free them. Both deer were saved and this lifesaving action was videoed on a body camera worn by Warden Koch. The video was shared by numerous social media and news outlets.

In June 2017, Kansas Game Wardens rescued a woman who flipped her Kayak at Perry Lake. This rescue made state headlines after the bodycamera video of the incident surfaced on a number of media sources.

On August 30, 2017, the Kansas Department of Wildlife and Parks deployed a fourteen-man team of Game Wardens to Texas to assist with water rescues after Hurricane Harvey struck the state. The wardens were equipped with a mobile command trailer and seven boats. Several successful voluntary evacuations were conducted during the deployment.

In 2019, Kansas Game Wardens Lynn Koch and Michael McGinnis responded to a tiger attack at the Topeka Zoo. The wardens rendered aid to zookeeper Kristyn Hayden-Ortega after the attack occurred.

In February 2019, Several Kansas Game Wardens were dispatched to a rural pond in McPherson County after a call came in that deer were stuck on the pond and had fallen through the ice. Wardens used specialized equipment to rescue a deer from the ice, although it appeared that several other deer may have broken through the ice and perished.

In May 2019, Game Wardens from the Kansas Department of Wildlife and Parks deployed an airboat to rescue a rural Neosho Rapids family stranded by floodwater. The airboat made two trips, evacuating a total of four people. Each trip took about 18 minutes round-trip. No injuries were reported.

In 2019, Game Warden Ross Uhrmacher received the Kansas Game Warden Officer of the Year award. He was pivotal in the rescue of an elderly man during a flooding situation, and he worked with local firefighters to navigate swift water to make the save. During the same flooding occurrences, he navigated flood waters to check flooded campers for stranded constituents and drove utility workers down the line to check electrical wiring.

In January 2021, Kansas Game Wardens once again made national news by successfully freeing two buck deer by shooting their antlers. The bodycamera video was shown on numerous media sites.

On July 14, 2025, at 1:00pm Game Warden Austin & K-9 Kai were requested by the Montgomery County Sheriff's Office to locate a missing elderly female that had wandered off in a remote section of property. With the heat index exceeding 90 degrees Kai was deployed in the area and within minutes a track was located. A few moments later Kai was able to locate the missing female. The female was given water and released to EMS.

== See also ==
- List of law enforcement agencies in Kansas
- List of state and territorial fish and wildlife management agencies in the United States
