= List of United States post offices in Kansas =

United States post offices operate under the authority of the United States Post Office Department (1792–1971) or the United States Postal Service (since 1971). Historically, post offices were usually placed in a prominent location. Many were architecturally distinctive, including notable buildings featuring Beaux-Arts, Art Deco, and Vernacular architecture. However, modern U.S. post offices were generally designed for functionality rather than architectural style.

Following is a list of United States post offices in Kansas. Notable post offices include individual buildings, whether still in service or not, which have architectural, historical, or community-related significance. Many of these are listed on the National Register of Historic Places (NRHP) or state and local historic registers.

Post office	City	Date built	Image	Architect	Notes	Ref.
United States Post Office (Anthony, Kansas)	Anthony	1937–1938		Louis A. Simon	(Note: Listed on the National Register of Historic Places) (Note: Houses the New Deal mural Turning a Corner by Joe Jones.)	
Atchison Post Office	Atchison	1893–1894		Willoughby J. Edbrooke		
United States Post Office (Augusta, Kansas)	Augusta	1938		Louis A. Simon	(Note: Houses the New Deal mural A Kansas Gusher by Donald Silks.)	
United States Post Office (Baxter Springs, Kansas)	Baxter Springs	1936		Louis A. Simon, Neal A. Nelick		
United States Post Office (Belleville, Kansas)	Belleville	1937–1938		Louis A. Simon	(Note: Houses the New Deal mural Kansas Stream by Birger Sandzen.)	
United States Post Office (Burlington, Kansas)	Burlington	1940		Louis A. Simon	(Note: Houses the New Deal artwork Boy and Colt, a stone carving by Robert Kittredge.)	
Caldwell United States Post Office	Caldwell	1939–1940		Louis A. Simon	(Note: Houses the New Deal Mural Cowboys Driving Cattle by Kenneth Evett.)	
United States Post Office (Columbus, Kansas)	Columbus	1937			(Note: Originally housed a New Deal artwork R.F.D., a terra-cotta bas relief by Waylande Gregory, now relocated to a local community center.)	
United States Post Office (Council Grove, Kansas)	Council Grove	1938–1939		Louis A. Simon		
United States Post Office (Eureka, Kansas)	Eureka	1936		Louis A. Simon	(Note: Houses the New Deal mural Cattle Roundup by Vance Kirkland.)	
United States Post Office (Fort Scott, Kansas)	Fort Scott	1936		Louis A. Simon, Neal A. Melick, Walter Earl Glover		
Fredonia Post Office	Fredonia	1939		Louis A. Simon		
United States Post Office (Goodland, Kansas)	Goodland	1935			(Note: Houses the New Deal mural Rural Free Delivery by Kenneth M. Adams.)	
United States Post Office (Halstead, Kansas)	Halstead	1939		Louis A. Simon	(Note: Houses the New Deal mural Where Kit Carson Camped by Birger Sandzen.)	
United States Post Office (Herington, Kansas)	Herington	1935		Louis A. Simon, Neal A. Melick, G. W. Stone	(Note: House the New Deal mural Arrival of the First Train in Herington–1885 by H. Louis Freund.)	
United States Post Office (Horton, Kansas)	Horton	1937–1938		Louis A. Simon		
United States Post Office (Hoisington, Kansas)	Hoisington	c. 1936		Louis A. Simon	(Note: Houses the New Deal mural Wheat Center by Dorothea Tomlinson.)	
United States Post Office (Hutchinson, Kansas)	Hutchinson	1939		Louis A. Simon. Neal A. Melick,		
Federal Building-United States Post Office (Independence, Kansas)	Independence	1911–1912		James Knox Taylor		
United States Post Office (Kingman, Kansas)	Kingman	1940		Louis A. Simon	(Note: Houses the New Deal mural In the Days of the Cattlemen’s Picnic by Jessie S. Wilber.)	
United States Post Office (Lawrence, Kansas)	Lawrence	c. 1906		James Knox Taylor		
United States Post Office, now Liberal Board of Education	Liberal	1935		Louis A. Simon, Neal A. Nelick	(Note: No longer used as a post office.)	
United States Post Office–Lindsborg	Lindsborg	1938		Louis A. Simon		
Neodesha United States Post Office	Neodesha	1935		Louis A. Simon	(Note: Houses the New Deal mural Neodesha’s First Inhabitants by Bernard J. Steffen.)	
United States Post Office (Olathe, Kansas), now Gurdwara Nanak Darbar Sahib	Olathe	1938		Louis A. Simon, Neal A. Nelick		
Oswego United States Post Office	Oswego	1940		Louis A. Simon	(Note: Houses the New Deal mural Farm Life by Robert E. Larter.)	
United StatesPost Office (Paola, Kansas)	Paola	1938				
United States Post Office (Russell, Kansas)	Russell	1939		Louis A. Simon, Neal A. Nelick	(Note: Houses the New Deal mural Wheat Workers by Martyl Schweig.)	
United States Post Office (Sabetha, Kansas)	Sabetha	1938		Louis A. Simon, Neal A. Nelick	(Note: Houses the New Deal mural The Hare and the Tortoise by Albert T. Reid.)	
United States Post Office and Federal Building (Salina, Kansas)	Salina	1937–1940		Lorimer Rich, Louis A. Simon, Neal A. Nelick	(Note: Building is a National Historic Landmark) (Note: Houses the New Deal artworks Land and Communication, stone carvings by Carl C. Mose.)	
United States Post Office (Seneca, Kansas)	Seneca	1938		Louis A. Simon	(Note: Houses the New Deal mural Men & Wheat by Joe Jones.)	
United States Post Office and Federal Building (Wichita, Kansas)	Wichita	1936		Louis A. Simon		
