= List of United States post office murals in Kansas =

Following is a list of United States post office murals created in Kansas between 1934 and 1943. A number of Kansas post offices were listed on the National Register on basis of their murals, as part of a study of "Kansas Post Offices with Artwork, 1936-1942".

Location	Mural title	Image	Artist	Date	Notes	NRHP listed
Anthony United States Post Office, Anthony	Turning a Corner		Joe Jones	1939	Oil on canvas mural shows three farmers using a combine to thresh wheat.	1989
Augusta	A Kansas Gusher		Donald Silks	1940		1989
Belleville	Kansas Stream		Birger Sandzen	1939		1989
Caldwell United States Post Office, Caldwell	Cowboys Driving Cattle		Kenneth Evett	1941	tempera	1989
Council Grove	Autumn Colors		Charles B. Rogers	1941		1989
Eureka	Cattle Roundup		Vance Kirkland	1938		1989
Fort Scott	Border Gateways		Oscar E. Berninghaus	1937		
Goodland	Rural Free Delivery		Kenneth Miller Adams	1937	oil on canvas	1989
Halstead	Where Kit Carson Camped		Birger Sandzen	1941		1989
Herington	Arrival of the First Train in Herington – 1885		H. Louis Freund	1937		
Hoisington	Wheat Center		Dorothea Tomlinson	1938		
Horton	Picnic in Kansas		Kenneth Evett	1938		1989
Horton	Changing of Horses for the Pony Express		Kenneth Evett	1939		1989
Hutchinson	Threshing in Kansas		Lumen Martin Winter	1942		1989
Kingman	In the Days of the cattleman's Picnic		Jessie S. Wilber	1942	fresco tempera on plaster	1989
United States Post Office–Lindsborg, in Lindsborg	Smoky River		Birger Sandzen	1938	oil on canvas	1989
Neodesha United States Post Office, Neodesha	Neodesha's First Inhabitants		Bernard J. Steffen	1938	Tempura on pressed wood board "that depicts the friendly relations between the Osage Indians of southeastern Kansas and the early white settlers. On the right side of the canvas Osage Chief Little Bear waves to Dr. T. Blakeslee, a physician responsible for much of the peacefulness between the two cultures."	1989
Olathe	The Mail Must Go Through		Albert T. Reid	1940	moved to Olathe Public Library	
Oswego United States Post Office, Oswego	Farm Life		Robert E. Larter	1940	tempera on canvas	1989
Russell	Wheat Workers		Martyl Schweig	1940	a harvest scene in a regional social realistic style	1989
Sabetha	The Hare and the Tortoise		Albert T. Reid	1937		1989
Seneca	Men and Wheat		Joe Jones	1940	Winner of the 48-State Mural Competition	1989
Wichita	Kansas Farming		Richard Haines	1936	United States Post Office and Federal Building (Wichita, Kansas)	
Wichita	Pioneers in Kansas		Ward Lockwood	1936	United States Post Office and Federal Building (Wichita, Kansas)	
