= National Register of Historic Places listings in Wilson County, Kansas =

Location of Wilson County in Kansas

This is a list of the National Register of Historic Places listings in Wilson County, Kansas. It is intended to be a complete list of the properties and districts on the National Register of Historic Places in Wilson County, Kansas, United States. The locations of National Register properties and districts for which the latitude and longitude coordinates are included below, may be seen in an online map.

There are 8 properties and districts listed on the National Register in the county, and one former listing.

This National Park Service list is complete through NPS recent listings posted November 13, 2026.

== Current listings ==
	Name on the Register	Image	Date listed	Location	City or town	Description
1	Brown Hotel	Brown Hotel	July 21, 1995 (#95000863)	523 Main St.; also 519-523 Main St. 37°25′03″N 95°40′50″W	Neodesha	519-523 Main represents a boundary increase of July 3, 2008
2	Brush Creek Bridge	Brush Creek Bridge	July 2, 1985 (#85001419)	½ mile south of Coyville; 37°40′41″N 95°53′48″W	Coyville	
3	Dorothy DeLay House		December 20, 2023 (#100008863)	124 North 2nd St. 37°25′06″N 95°40′34″W	Neodesha	
4	Dr. A.C. Flack House	Dr. A.C. Flack House	September 21, 1989 (#89001463)	303 N. 8th St. 37°32′02″N 95°49′35″W	Fredonia	
5	Gold Dust Hotel	Gold Dust Hotel	November 1, 1991 (#91001542)	402 N. 7th St. 37°32′02″N 95°49′33″W	Fredonia	Built in 1884.
6	Norman No. 1 Oil Well Site	Norman No. 1 Oil Well Site	August 28, 1974 (#74000846)	E. Mill St. 37°24′45″N 95°37′40″W	Neodesha	
7	US Post Office-Fredonia	US Post Office-Fredonia	October 17, 1989 (#89001638)	428 Madison St. 37°32′05″N 95°49′53″W	Fredonia	
8	US Post Office-Neodesha	US Post Office-Neodesha	October 17, 1989 (#89001647)	123 N. 5th St. 37°25′00″N 95°40′53″W	Neodesha	

== Former listings ==
	Name on the Register	Image	Date listed	Date removed	Location	City or town	Description
1	Neodesha City Hall Building		March 26, 2018 (#100002248)	November 26, 2024	102 S. 4th St. 37°25′02″N 95°40′43″W	Neodesha	

== See also ==
- List of National Historic Landmarks in Kansas
- National Register of Historic Places listings in Kansas
