= Lafontaine, Kansas =

Unincorporated community in Wilson County, Kansas

- CDP
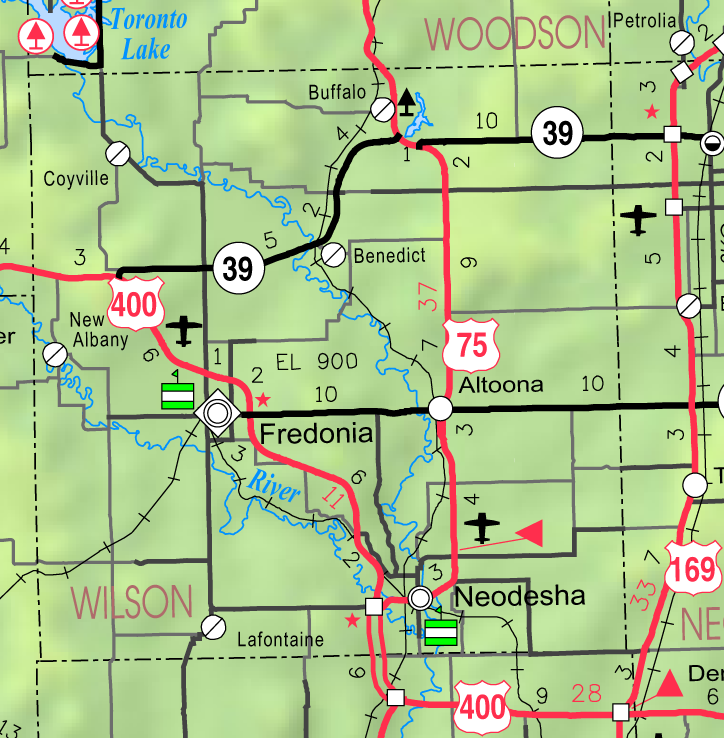
- KDOT map of Wilson County (legend)

- Location within Kansas Location within the United States
- Coordinates: 37°23′57″N 95°50′43″W
- Country: United States
- State: Kansas
- County: Wilson
- Founded: 1879
- Elevation: 915 ft (279 m)

Population (2020)
  - Total: 58
- Time zone: UTC-6 (CST)
  - Summer (DST): UTC-5 (CDT)
- Area code: 620
- FIPS code: 20-37675
- GNIS ID: 469998

Lafontaine is a census-designated place (CDP) in Wilson County, Kansas, United States. As of the 2020 census, the population was 58. It is located south of Fredonia and west of Neodesha.

== History ==
Lafontaine was founded in 1879.

The Missouri Pacific Railroad was built through Lafontaine in 1886.

A post office was opened in Lafontaine in 1879, and remained in operation until it was discontinued in 1991.

== Demographics ==
Historical population
Census	Pop.	Note	%±
2020	58		—
U.S. Decennial Census

The 2020 United States census counted 58 people, 23 households, and 14 families in Lafontaine. The population density was 29.1 per square mile (11.2/km^{2}). There were 30 housing units at an average density of 15.0 per square mile (5.8/km^{2}). The racial makeup was 77.59% (45) white or European American (75.86% non-Hispanic white), 0.0% (0) black or African-American, 1.72% (1) Native American or Alaska Native, 3.45% (2) Asian, 0.0% (0) Pacific Islander or Native Hawaiian, 5.17% (3) from other races, and 12.07% (7) from two or more races. Hispanic or Latino of any race was 3.45% (2) of the population.

Of the 23 households, 21.7% had children under the age of 18; 34.8% were married couples living together; 39.1% had a female householder with no spouse or partner present. 30.4% of households consisted of individuals and 17.4% had someone living alone who was 65 years of age or older. The average household size was 5.3 and the average family size was 5.3. The percent of those with a bachelor's degree or higher was estimated to be 0.0% of the population.

29.3% of the population was under the age of 18, 6.9% from 18 to 24, 25.9% from 25 to 44, 27.6% from 45 to 64, and 10.3% who were 65 years of age or older. The median age was 36.3 years. For every 100 females, there were 114.8 males. For every 100 females ages 18 and older, there were 105.0 males.
