= Brush Creek Bridge =

Brush Creek Bridge may refer to:

- Brush Creek Bridge (Baxter Springs, Kansas) on historic US 66, also known as the Rainbow Bridge
- Brush Creek Bridge (Coyville, Kansas), listed on the National Register of Historic Places in Wilson County, Kansas
- Brush Creek Bridge (Oregon) on US 101
