= Chetopa Township, Kansas =

Chetopa Township, Kansas may refer to one of the two following places:

- Chetopa Township, Wilson County, Kansas
- Chetopa Township, Neosho County, Kansas

== See also ==
- List of Kansas townships
