= Bernhard Steffen =

Bernhard Steffen may refer to:

- Bernhard Steffen (footballer) (born 1937), German footballer
- Bernhard Steffen (computer scientist) (born 1958), German computer scientist
- Bernard Joseph Steffen (1907 – 1980), American artist
