= Grimes Poznikov =

American musician and entertainer

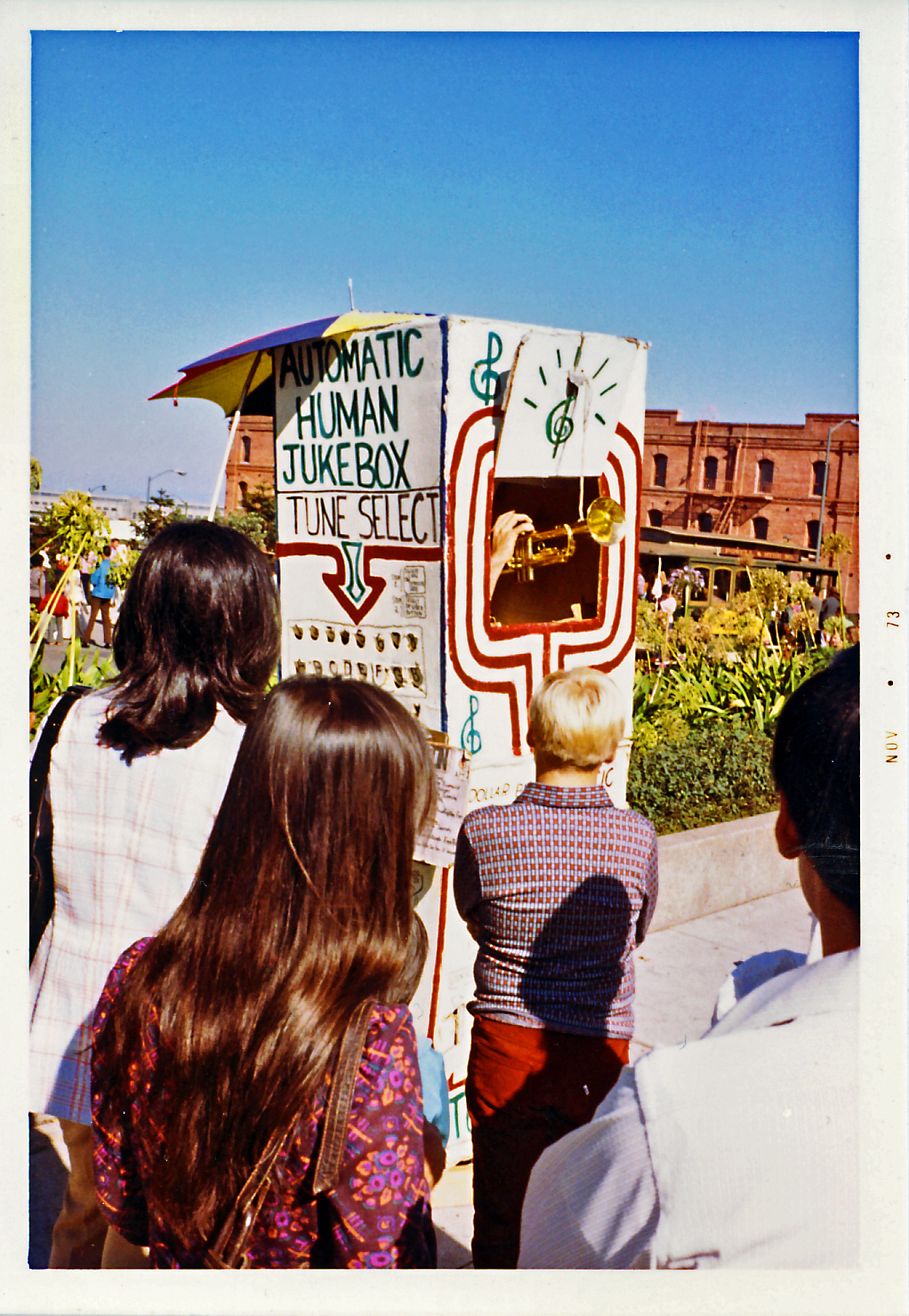
Poznikov performing as the Automatic Human Jukebox in 1973

Grimes Poznikov (August 5, 1946 – October 27, 2005), known as "The Human Jukebox," was an American musician and entertainer, a fixture of San Francisco's Fisherman's Wharf in the 1970s and 1980s. He was a street performer, who would wait in a decorated cardboard refrigerator box until a passerby offered him a donation and requested a song. He would then open the front flap of the box and play the requested song on a trumpet, kazoo, or one of a number of other instruments.

== Early life and education ==
Posnikov was born in Neodesha, Kansas to Albert Poznik, a lawyer, and Bernie Poznik, a performing artist and singer. From an early age he learned to play any musical instrument from piano to trumpet and drums. He graduated from Neodesha High School in 1964 and continued his education at Cornell College, graduating in 1969 with a degree in psychology.

After graduating from college, Poznikov taught elementary school in Chicago, Illinois for three years.

== Street performing ==
While teaching, he became involved in the peace movement and he was arrested at the 1968 Democratic National Convention in Chicago with other war protesters while blowing "America the Beautiful" on the trumpet. In 1972, he set up a trailer during the 1972 Republican National Convention in Miami, Florida, calling it the "American Lobotomy Machine". He and other peace demonstrators sat in it for hours, pretending to be brainwashed into being "good Americans."

Poznikov played as the Automatic Human Jukebox in Aquatic Park near the cable car turnaround, earning, in 1973, about $60 a week working two hours a day.

ABC News reported in 1975 that the San Francisco Board of Supervisors wanted to keep musical vendors under tighter control. Poznikov presented city hall with petition of 21,166 signatures asking that musicians and artists be allowed to continue. Voters to decide November 1975.

Poznikov played Taps at the vigil held on the steps of SF City Hall after the assassinations of Mayor George Moscone and Supervisor Harvey Milk, November 27, 1978.

Poznikov was featured on Charles Kuralt's “On the Road” show on CBS, “The Mike Douglas Show,” and "To Tell the Truth" in San Francisco guidebooks, in Penthouse magazine, in Newsweek magazine, in Briarpatch Review and the Wall Street Journal.

Poznikov was arrested several times for selling marijuana. He got busted for selling marijuana to high school kids in 1982. He had repeated complaints, blocking the sidewalk, making noise. In 1987, he was forced out of his spot at Hyde and Beach streets after complaints of loud music, playing “I Left My Heart in San Francisco” 13 decibels above the sound limit. His teeth were knocked out by police during the last arrest in the late 1980s, ending his ability to play trumpet.

== Final years ==
Poznikov lost his apartment, stayed with friends and then on the streets. He suffered emotionally, and began abusing drugs. In 2002 he was living under a rotting baby grand piano in a homeless encampment near Caltrain tracks. Shortly after Christmas one year, crews hired by the city broke up the camp with bulldozers at daybreak and Poznikov lost what scraps remained of his life.

He died on October 27, 2005, on a sidewalk near Cesar Chavez and Bayshore Freeway, of alcohol poisoning.

Poznikov was survived by his sister, Jenny Predpelski of Overland Park, KS; girlfriend, Susan "Harmony" Tanner; and two brothers, Greg Poznik of Madison, Wis., and Sam Silver of Aurora, Colo.

== Legacy ==
Broken Jukebox: a short opera about Grimes Poznikov for soprano, baritone, chorus, string quintet, trumpet and piano premiered January 2008 at College of Marin.
