= Rest, Kansas =

Unincorporated community in Wilson County, Kansas

Coordinates: 37°39′11″N 95°39′38″W

Rest is an unincorporated community in Wilson County, Kansas, United States.

== History ==
A post office was opened in Rest in 1877, and remained in operation until it was discontinued in 1955. The community was named by an older settler who intended spend out his years at this locale restfully.
