= Vilas, Kansas =

Unincorporated community in Wilson County, Kansas

Coordinates: 37°39′15″N 95°35′11″W

Vilas is an unincorporated community in Wilson County, Kansas, United States.

== History ==
Vilas had its start in the year 1886 by the building of the railroad through that territory.

Vilas had a post office from the 1880s until 1954.
