= Buxton, Kansas =

Unincorporated community in Wilson County, Kansas

Coordinates: 37°26′54″N 95°55′14″W

Buxton is an unincorporated community in Wilson County, Kansas, United States.

== History ==
Buxton had its start in the year 1866 by the building of the Atchison, Topeka and Santa Fe Railway through that territory. Buxton was named for a railroad official.

The post office in Buxton was discontinued in 1921.
