= Don Myers =

American politician (1932–2026)

Member of the Kansas House of Representatives from the 82nd district
- In office January 11, 1993 – January 10, 2011
- Preceded by: Elizabeth Baker
- Succeeded by: Jim Howell

Personal details
- Born: February 2, 1932 Fredonia, Kansas, U.S.
- Died: July 28, 2026 (aged 94) Wichita, Kansas, U.S.
- Party: Republican
- Spouse: Mary
- Children: 3

Donald V. Myers (February 2, 1932 – July 28, 2026) was an American politician who served as a member of the Kansas House of Representatives from 1993 to 2011, representing the 82nd district. In 2010, the Americans for Prosperity – Kansas Chapter gave him a 90% evaluation on conservative issues.

== Life and career ==
Myers had a BS in mechanical engineering and worked as a senior specialist engineer at Boeing.

He was a member of the American Legion, Derby Chamber of Commerce, Derby First Christian Church, National Rifle Association of America and Veterans of Foreign Wars. Myers was married to Mary and had three children; Jerry, Lane and Sherry. He lived in Derby, Kansas. Myers died in Wichita, Kansas, on July 28, 2026, at the age of 94.

== Committee membership ==
- Energy and Utilities
- Veterans, Military and Homeland Security (Chair)
- Aging and Long Term Care
- Economic Development and Tourism
