= New Albany, Kansas =

City in Wilson County, Kansas

- City
- Location within Wilson County and Kansas

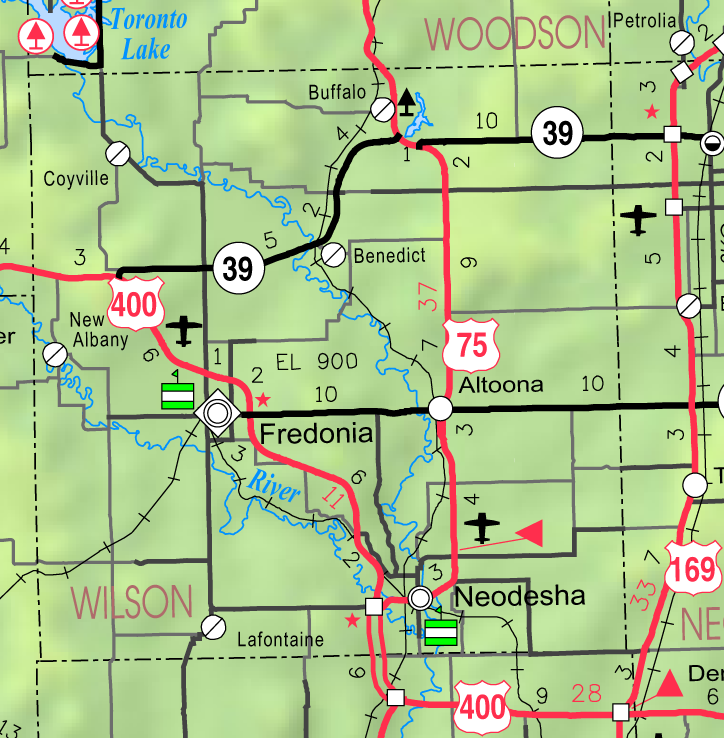
- KDOT map of Wilson County (legend)
- Coordinates: 37°34′4″N 95°56′22″W
- Country: United States
- State: Kansas
- County: Wilson
- Founded: 1866
- Incorporated: 1907
- Named for: New Albany, Indiana

Area
  - Total: 0.19 sq mi (0.48 km^{2})
  - Land: 0.19 sq mi (0.48 km^{2})
  - Water: 0 sq mi (0.00 km^{2})
- Elevation: 896 ft (273 m)

Population (2020)
  - Total: 57
  - Density: 310/sq mi (120/km^{2})
- Time zone: UTC-6 (CST)
  - Summer (DST): UTC-5 (CDT)
- ZIP Code: 66759
- Area code: 620
- FIPS code: 20-50150
- GNIS ID: 475073

New Albany is a city in Wilson County, Kansas, United States. As of the 2020 census, the population of the city was 57.

== History ==
New Albany was founded in 1866. It was named after New Albany, Indiana.

The first post office in New Albany was established in May 1866.

== Geography ==
New Albany is located at 37°34′4″N 95°56′22″W (37.567805, -95.939453). According to the United States Census Bureau, the city has a total area of 0.23 square miles (0.60 km^{2}), all land.

== Demographics ==
Historical population
Census	Pop.	Note	%±
1880	232		—
1910	213		—
1920	223		4.7%
1930	150		−32.7%
1940	165		10.0%
1950	152		−7.9%
1960	104		−31.6%
1970	59		−43.3%
1980	78		32.2%
1990	60		−23.1%
2000	73		21.7%
2010	56		−23.3%
2020	57		1.8%
U.S. Decennial Census

=== 2020 census ===
The 2020 United States census counted 57 people, 18 households, and 13 families in New Albany. The population density was 308.1 per square mile (119.0/km^{2}). There were 29 housing units at an average density of 156.8 per square mile (60.5/km^{2}). The racial makeup was 89.47% (51) white or European American (85.96% non-Hispanic white), 0.0% (0) black or African-American, 1.75% (1) Native American or Alaska Native, 0.0% (0) Asian, 0.0% (0) Pacific Islander or Native Hawaiian, 1.75% (1) from other races, and 7.02% (4) from two or more races. Hispanic or Latino of any race was 7.02% (4) of the population.

Of the 18 households, 44.4% had children under the age of 18; 50.0% were married couples living together; 27.8% had a female householder with no spouse or partner present. 27.8% of households consisted of individuals and 11.1% had someone living alone who was 65 years of age or older. The average household size was 3.0 and the average family size was 3.3. The percent of those with a bachelor's degree or higher was estimated to be 0.0% of the population.

29.8% of the population was under the age of 18, 5.3% from 18 to 24, 21.1% from 25 to 44, 26.3% from 45 to 64, and 17.5% who were 65 years of age or older. The median age was 40.3 years. For every 100 females, there were 90.0 males. For every 100 females ages 18 and older, there were 122.2 males.

The 2016–2020 5-year American Community Survey estimates show that the median household income was $68,125 (with a margin of error of +/- $30,073) and the median family income was $69,063 (+/- $22,156). Males had a median income of $31,597 (+/- $7,123) versus $39,688 (+/- $5,332) for females. The median income for those above 16 years old was $32,083 (+/- $12,499). Approximately, 0.0% of families and 0.0% of the population were below the poverty line, including 0.0% of those under the age of 18 and 0.0% of those ages 65 or over.

=== 2010 census ===
As of the census of 2010, there were 56 people, 23 households, and 17 families residing in the city. The population density was 243.5 inhabitants per square mile (94.0/km^{2}). There were 32 housing units at an average density of 139.1 per square mile (53.7/km^{2}). The racial makeup of the city was 96.4% White and 3.6% from two or more races. Hispanic or Latino of any race were 7.1% of the population.

There were 23 households, of which 30.4% had children under the age of 18 living with them, 73.9% were married couples living together, and 26.1% were non-families. 26.1% of all households were made up of individuals, and 13% had someone living alone who was 65 years of age or older. The average household size was 2.43 and the average family size was 2.94.

The median age in the city was 46.5 years. 23.2% of residents were under the age of 18; 1.8% were between the ages of 18 and 24; 21.4% were from 25 to 44; 32.2% were from 45 to 64; and 21.4% were 65 years of age or older. The gender makeup of the city was 55.4% male and 44.6% female.

=== 2000 census ===
As of the census of 2000, there were 73 people, 30 households, and 23 families residing in the city. The population density was 321.9 inhabitants per square mile (124.3/km^{2}). There were 41 housing units at an average density of 180.8 per square mile (69.8/km^{2}). The racial makeup of the city was 94.52% White, 4.11% Native American, and 1.37% from two or more races. Hispanic or Latino of any race were 1.37% of the population.

There were 30 households, out of which 23.3% had children under the age of 18 living with them, 70.0% were married couples living together, 6.7% had a female householder with no husband present, and 23.3% were non-families. 20.0% of all households were made up of individuals, and 10.0% had someone living alone who was 65 years of age or older. The average household size was 2.43 and the average family size was 2.74.

In the city, the population was spread out, with 17.8% under the age of 18, 6.8% from 18 to 24, 17.8% from 25 to 44, 38.4% from 45 to 64, and 19.2% who were 65 years of age or older. The median age was 48 years. For every 100 females, there were 102.8 males. For every 100 females age 18 and over, there were 87.5 males.

The median income for a household in the city was $23,125, and the median income for a family was $27,500. Males had a median income of $18,125 versus $12,188 for females. The per capita income for the city was $8,622. There were 16.7% of families and 25.0% of the population living below the poverty line, including 53.8% of under eighteens and none of those over 64.
