= Roper, Kansas =

Unincorporated community in Wilson County, Kansas

Coordinates: 37°39′40″N 95°43′58″W

Roper is an unincorporated community in Wilson County, Kansas, United States.

== History ==
Roper was founded in 1886. It was named Roper in honor of a railroad official.

The post office in Roper was discontinued in 1933.
