= Brown Hotel (Neodesha, Kansas) =

- U.S. National Register of Historic Places
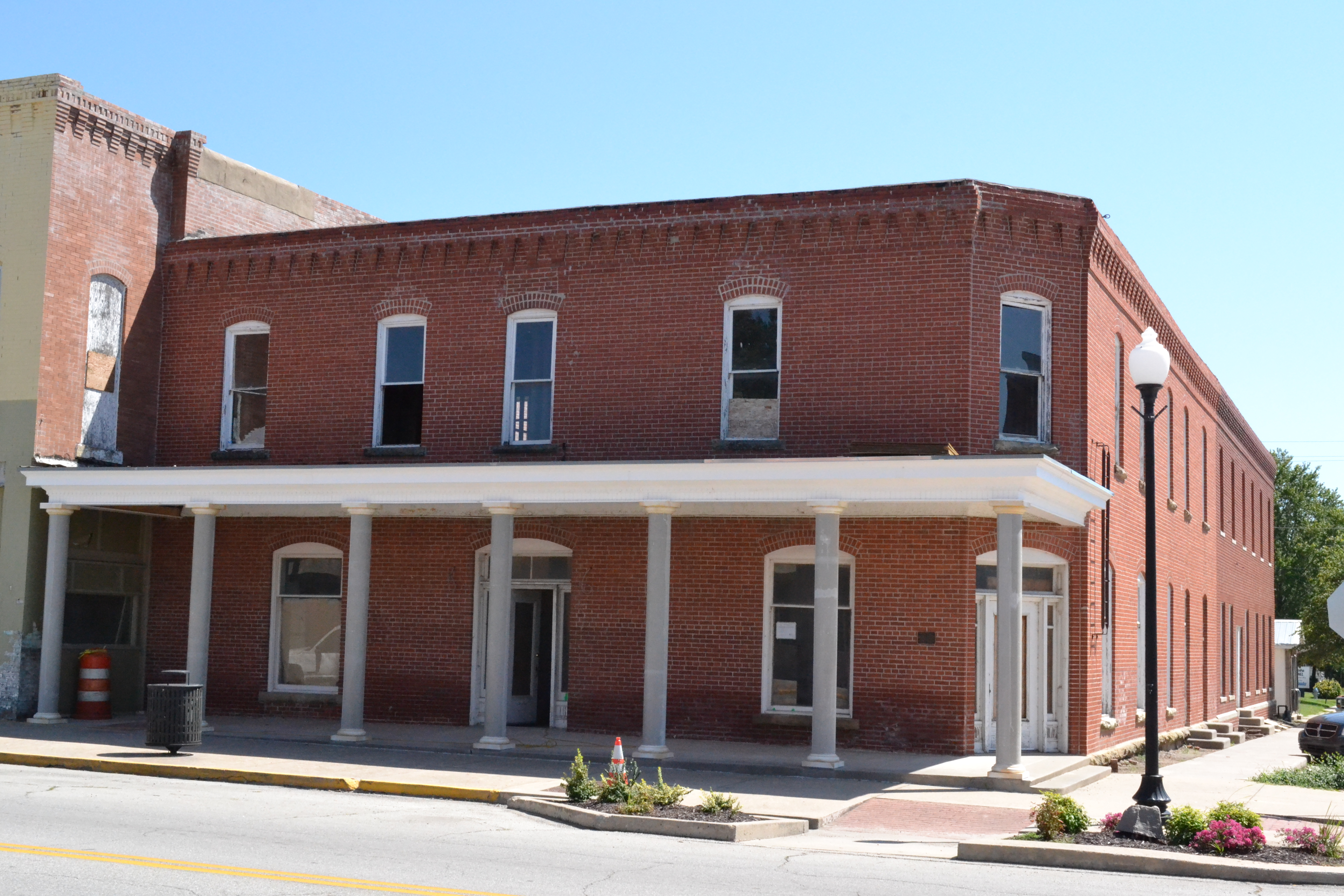
- The Brown Hotel in 2017

- Location within Kansas Location within the United States
- Location: 523 Main St., Neodesha, Kansas
- Coordinates: 37°25′03″N 95°40′50″W
- Built: 1896, c. 1904
- Built by: Henry Dooley
- Architectural style: Italianate, Early Commercial
- NRHP reference No.: 08000690 (original); 95000863 (increase)

Significant dates
- Added to NRHP: July 21, 1995
- Boundary increase: July 3, 2008

The Brown Hotel, located at 523 Main Street in Neodesha, Kansas, was built in 1886. It was listed on the National Register of Historic Places in 1995. The listing was expanded in 2008.

Its main facades face north onto Main Street and west onto 6th Avenue; the main entrance is on an angle at the corner itself. This two-story structure, constructed in 1896 to replace an earlier frame building which was destroyed in a fire, features a veranda added around 1904. The 1995 National Register listing also included a two-story 1922 brick addition extending the building to the south. After further research was completed, the listing was expanded in 2008 to include a two-story brick commercial building adjacent on the east, which was built around 1904 and was connected to the original hotel.
