= Dr. A. C. Flack House =

Historic house in Kansas, United States

- U.S. National Register of Historic Places
- Dr. A. C. Flack House in 2026

- Location within Kansas Location within the United States
- Location: 303 N. 8th St., Fredonia, Kansas
- Coordinates: 37°32′02″N 95°49′35″W
- Area: Less than one acre
- Built: 1895, c. 1910
- Architectural style: Queen Anne
- NRHP reference No.: 89001463
- Added to NRHP: September 21, 1989

The Dr. A. C. Flack House, located at 303 N. 8th St. in Fredonia, Kansas, is a Queen Anne-style house built in 1895.

It was deemed notable "for its architectural significance as a Queen Anne Cottage" and was described as "a textbook example of a spindlework Queen Anne cottage. Its high hipped roof with projecting cross gables comprises the most common Queen Anne house type found in this country."

It was home of physician A.C. Flack from 1895 until his death in 1949.

A brick garage on the property was built in about 1910 and is considered to be a second contributing building in the listing.
