= Norman No. 1 Oil Well =

- Norman No. 1 Oil Well Site
- U.S. National Register of Historic Places
- U.S. National Historic Landmark
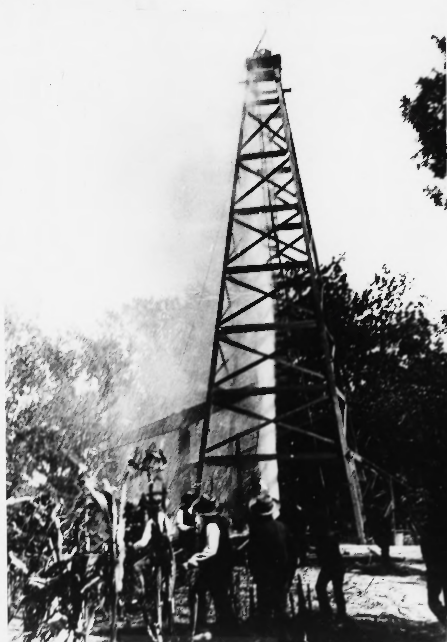
- The well in 1893

- Location within Kansas Location within the United States
- Location: Northeast corner of Mill and First Streets, Neodesha, Kansas
- Coordinates: 37°24′53″N 95°40′23″W
- Area: 1-acre (0.40 ha)
- Built: 1892
- Architect: McBride, A.P.; Bloom, Cam
- NRHP reference No.: 74000846

Significant dates
- Added to NRHP: August 28, 1974
- Designated NHL: December 22, 1977

Norman No. 1 Oil Well Site is the site of an abandoned oil well, located at the northeast corner of Mill and First Streets in Neodesha, Kansas, USA. The well, which was drilled on November 28, 1892, was the first successful well in what is now known as the Mid-Continent oil field, kicking off a major oil boom in states from Kansas to Texas and Louisiana. The well site, now a small municipal park, was designated a National Historic Landmark in 1977.

== Description and history ==
The Norman No. 1 Oil Well Site is located in the small southeastern Kansas town of Neodesha, at the northeast corner of 1st and East Mill Streets. (It is not on the south side of Main Street, where a replica oil derrick stands.) The site is in a small public park, about 1 acre (0.40 ha) in size, set on the western bank of the Verdigris River. The park has open grassy areas and a small parking area, and the original site of the oil well is marked by a plaque. The park originally housed a small visitors center, playground, restrooms, and the replica derrick, but all of these were removed due to repeated flooding.

The Neodesha area was known to Native Americans for glowing "gas springs" prior to its settlement by westward-migrating Americans. Reports of this feature eventually brought William Mills, an oil explorer to the town. One of the sites he selected for drilling was on the land of T.J. Norman, a local blacksmith. On November 28, 1892, the well struck oil at a depth of 832 feet (254 m). This kicked off a local boom, which was eventually expanded to a much larger geographic area by other finds.

Norman No. 1 operated until 1919, when part of the well casing failed, and its infrastructure was dismantled. The city built a replica of the derrick and other infrastructure on the site in 1961, turning it into a small park and tourist attraction. The derrick and museum were moved to Main Street in 1989, due to repeated flooding of the site.

== See also ==
- List of National Historic Landmarks in Kansas
- National Register of Historic Places listings in Wilson County, Kansas
