= United States Post Office (Horton, Kansas) =

- US Post Office–Horton
- U.S. National Register of Historic Places
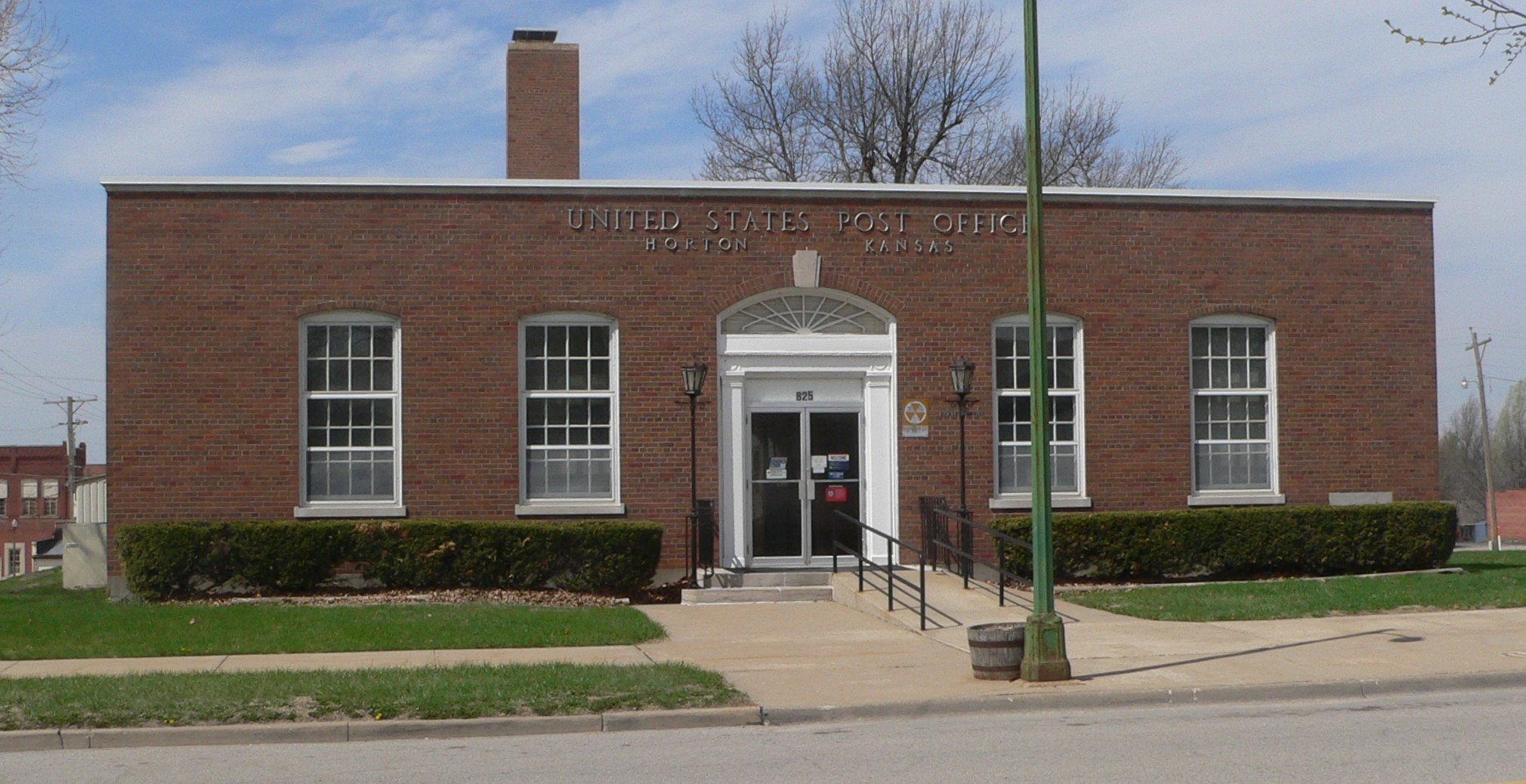

- Location within Kansas
- Location: 825 1st Ave. E., Horton, Kansas
- Coordinates: 39°39′39″N 95°31′34″W
- Area: less than one acre
- Built: 1937-38
- Architect: Louis Simon
- Architectural style: Classical Revival
- MPS: Kansas Post Offices with Artwork, 1936--1942 MPS
- NRHP reference No.: 89001643
- Added to NRHP: October 17, 1989

The United States Post Office, located at 825 1st Avenue E., is the main post office serving Horton, Kansas. The Neoclassical building was built circa 1937-38 and designed by Supervising Architect Louis Simon. The inside of the post office includes two murals, both painted by Kenneth Evett for the Treasury Department's post office mural program; the additional mural is unusual for a small post office. The first mural, titled Picnic in Kansas, was completed in 1938 and depicts a large family at a picnic. The second mural, titled Changing of Horses for the Pony Express, was completed the following year and shows a Pony Express rider leaving a station.

The building was added to the National Register of Historic Places on October 17, 1989.
