= Wilson County, Kansas =

County in Kansas, United States

- County
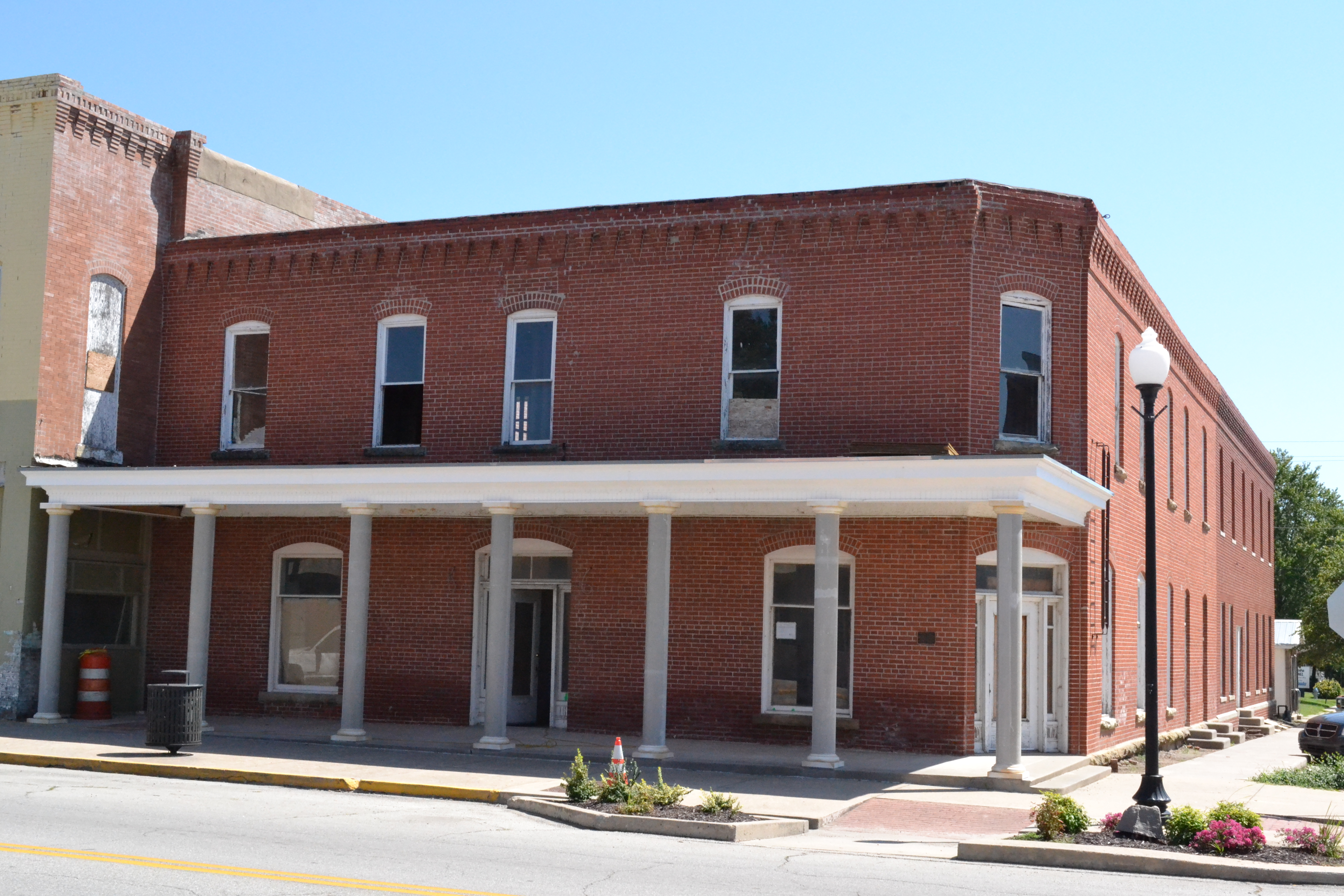
- Brown Hotel in Neodesha (2017)

- Location within the U.S. state of Kansas
- Coordinates: 37°34′00″N 95°44′00″W
- Country: United States
- State: Kansas
- Founded: 1855
- Named for: Hiero T. Wilson
- Seat: Fredonia
- Largest city: Neodesha

Area
  - Total: 575 sq mi (1,490 km^{2})
  - Land: 570 sq mi (1,500 km^{2})
  - Water: 4.7 sq mi (12 km^{2}) 0.8%

Population (2020)
  - Total: 8,624
  - Estimate (2025): 8,299 ▼
  - Density: 15/sq mi (5.8/km^{2})
- Time zone: UTC−6 (Central)
  - Summer (DST): UTC−5 (CDT)
- Congressional district: 2nd
- Website: ks420.cichosting.com/main/

Wilson County is a county located in Southeast Kansas. Its county seat is Fredonia. As of the 2020 census, the county population was 8,624. The county was named after Hiero Wilson, a colonel in the American Civil War.

== History ==
=== Early history ===
For many millennia, the Great Plains of North America was inhabited by nomadic Native Americans. From the 16th century to 18th century, the Kingdom of France claimed ownership of large parts of North America. In 1762, after the French and Indian War, France secretly ceded New France to Spain, per the Treaty of Fontainebleau.

=== 19th century ===
In 1802, Spain returned most of the land to France, but keeping title to about 7,500 square miles. In 1803, most of the land for modern day Kansas was acquired by the United States from France as part of the 828,000 square mile Louisiana Purchase for 2.83 cents per acre.

In 1854, the Kansas Territory was organized. In 1855, Wilson County was established and included what is now Wilson County and Montgomery County. It was named for Colonel Hiero T. Wilson. He was a successful Indian trader who had been the first white settler of Fort Scott, Kansas and had served as postmaster and sutler at the fort. He could speak Cherokee, Creek, and Osage and the Osage called him "Big White Chief". He was a delegate to the Lecompton Constitutional Convention.

== Geography ==
According to the U.S. Census Bureau, the county has a total area of 575 square miles (1,490 km^{2}), of which 570 square miles (1,500 km^{2}) is land and 4.7 square miles (12 km^{2}) (0.8%) is water.

=== Adjacent counties ===
- Woodson County (north)
- Allen County (northeast)
- Neosho County (east)
- Montgomery County (south)
- Elk County (west)
- Greenwood County (northwest)

== Demographics ==
Historical population
Census	Pop.	Note	%±
1860	27		—
1870	6,694		24,692.6%
1880	13,775		105.8%
1890	15,286		11.0%
1900	15,621		2.2%
1910	19,810		26.8%
1920	21,157		6.8%
1930	18,646		−11.9%
1940	17,723		−5.0%
1950	14,815		−16.4%
1960	13,077		−11.7%
1970	11,317		−13.5%
1980	12,128		7.2%
1990	10,289		−15.2%
2000	10,332		0.4%
2010	9,409		−8.9%
2020	8,624		−8.3%
2025 (est.)	8,299	▼	−3.8%
U.S. Decennial Census; 1790-1960 1900-1990; 1990-2000 2010-2020

=== 2020 census ===
As of the 2020 census, the county had a population of 8,624. The median age was 43.6 years. 23.4% of residents were under the age of 18 and 22.1% of residents were 65 years of age or older. For every 100 females there were 97.3 males, and for every 100 females age 18 and over there were 95.7 males age 18 and over.

The racial makeup of the county was 90.0% White, 0.3% Black or African American, 1.0% American Indian and Alaska Native, 0.4% Asian, 0.0% Native Hawaiian and Pacific Islander, 1.0% from some other race, and 7.3% from two or more races. Hispanic or Latino residents of any race comprised 3.0% of the population.

0.0% of residents lived in urban areas, while 100.0% lived in rural areas.

There were 3,636 households in the county, of which 28.1% had children under the age of 18 living with them and 26.3% had a female householder with no spouse or partner present. About 31.7% of all households were made up of individuals and 15.7% had someone living alone who was 65 years of age or older.

There were 4,485 housing units, of which 18.9% were vacant. Among occupied housing units, 72.8% were owner-occupied and 27.2% were renter-occupied. The homeowner vacancy rate was 3.7% and the rental vacancy rate was 11.0%.

=== 2000 census ===
As of the census of 2000, there were 10,332 people, 4,203 households, and 2,849 families residing in the county. The population density was 18 people per square mile (6.9 people/km^{2}). There were 4,937 housing units at an average density of 9 per square mile (3.5/km^{2}). The racial makeup of the county was 96.78% White, 0.37% Black or African American, 0.88% Native American, 0.26% Asian, 0.04% Pacific Islander, 0.48% from other races, and 1.19% from two or more races. 1.67% of the population were Hispanic or Latino of any race.

There were 4,203 households, out of which 29.60% had children under the age of 18 living with them, 57.10% were married couples living together, 7.80% had a female householder with no husband present, and 32.20% were non-families. 29.10% of all households were made up of individuals, and 15.80% had someone living alone who was 65 years of age or older. The average household size was 2.40 and the average family size was 2.96.

In the county, the population was spread out, with 25.40% under the age of 18, 7.40% from 18 to 24, 23.80% from 25 to 44, 23.40% from 45 to 64, and 19.90% who were 65 years of age or older. The median age was 41 years. For every 100 females there were 94.20 males. For every 100 females age 18 and over, there were 89.60 males.

The median income for a household in the county was $29,747, and the median income for a family was $36,990. Males had a median income of $27,255 versus $18,670 for females. The per capita income for the county was $14,910. About 7.50% of families and 11.30% of the population were below the poverty line, including 13.40% of those under age 18 and 11.80% of those age 65 or over.

== Government ==
=== Presidential elections ===
Presidential election results

United States presidential election results for Wilson County, Kansas
Year	Republican		Democratic		Third party(ies)	
Year	No.	%	No.	%	No.	%
1888	2,191	55.48%	1,035	26.21%	723	18.31%
1892	1,803	51.80%	0	0.00%	1,678	48.20%
1896	1,852	48.38%	1,959	51.18%	17	0.44%
1900	2,193	55.58%	1,711	43.36%	42	1.06%
1904	2,583	63.37%	1,034	25.37%	459	11.26%
1908	2,428	53.14%	1,777	38.89%	364	7.97%
1912	849	19.92%	1,304	30.60%	2,108	49.47%
1916	2,970	41.81%	3,494	49.18%	640	9.01%
1920	4,024	66.23%	1,768	29.10%	284	4.67%
1924	4,596	65.00%	1,736	24.55%	739	10.45%
1928	5,603	78.46%	1,465	20.52%	73	1.02%
1932	3,422	44.93%	4,001	52.53%	193	2.53%
1936	4,829	55.59%	3,816	43.93%	42	0.48%
1940	5,288	64.42%	2,859	34.83%	62	0.76%
1944	4,248	68.57%	1,912	30.86%	35	0.56%
1948	3,868	59.45%	2,538	39.01%	100	1.54%
1952	5,180	73.18%	1,845	26.07%	53	0.75%
1956	4,502	73.00%	1,645	26.67%	20	0.32%
1960	4,333	67.77%	2,034	31.81%	27	0.42%
1964	2,919	52.54%	2,592	46.65%	45	0.81%
1968	3,340	63.35%	1,276	24.20%	656	12.44%
1972	3,568	74.80%	1,043	21.87%	159	3.33%
1976	2,682	55.67%	2,047	42.49%	89	1.85%
1980	3,328	69.32%	1,205	25.10%	268	5.58%
1984	3,663	72.23%	1,344	26.50%	64	1.26%
1988	2,743	63.12%	1,545	35.55%	58	1.33%
1992	1,925	41.53%	1,331	28.72%	1,379	29.75%
1996	2,458	56.41%	1,297	29.77%	602	13.82%
2000	2,748	67.11%	1,186	28.96%	161	3.93%
2004	3,263	74.19%	1,060	24.10%	75	1.71%
2008	2,850	69.16%	1,170	28.39%	101	2.45%
2012	2,825	76.00%	818	22.01%	74	1.99%
2016	2,788	77.64%	594	16.54%	209	5.82%
2020	3,153	79.74%	723	18.29%	78	1.97%
2024	2,894	80.32%	647	17.96%	62	1.72%

Wilson County has long voted predominantly Republican. No Democratic presidential candidate has carried Wilson County since Franklin D. Roosevelt in 1932, and none has exceeded 36 percent since Jimmy Carter in 1976.

=== Laws ===
Following amendment to the Kansas Constitution in 1986, the county remained a prohibition, or "dry", county until 1998, when voters approved the sale of alcoholic liquor by the individual drink with a 30 percent food sales requirement.

== Education ==
=== Unified school districts ===
- Altoona-Midway USD 387
- Neodesha USD 461
- Fredonia USD 484

== Communities ==
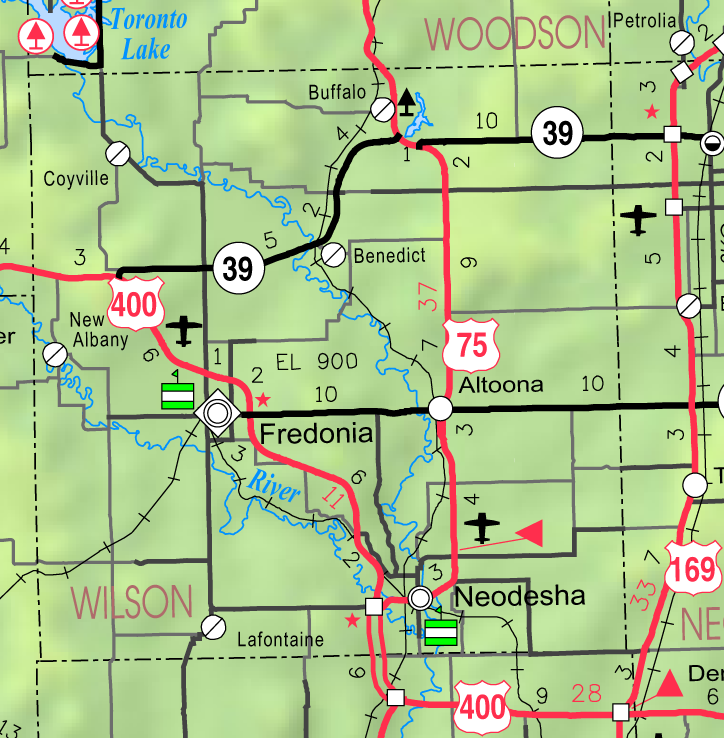
2005 map of Wilson County (map legend)

List of townships / incorporated cities / unincorporated communities / extinct former communities within Wilson County.

=== Cities ===
- Altoona
- Benedict
- Buffalo
- Coyville
- Fredonia (county seat)
- Neodesha
- New Albany

=== Unincorporated communities ===
† means a community is designated a Census-Designated Place (CDP) by the United States Census Bureau.

- Buxton
- Lafontaine†
- Rest
- Roper
- Vilas

=== Townships ===
Wilson County is divided into fifteen townships. The cities of Fredonia and Neodesha are considered governmentally independent and are excluded from the census figures for the townships. In the following table, the population center is the largest city (or cities) included in that township's population total, if it is of a significant size.

Sources: 2000 U.S. Gazetteer from the U.S. Census Bureau.
Township	FIPS	Population center	Population	Population density /km^{2} (/sq mi)	Land area km^{2} (sq mi)	Water area km^{2} (sq mi)	Water %	Geographic coordinates
Cedar	11375		701	8 (19)	93 (36)	0 (0)	0.11%	37°31′21″N 95°40′14″W
Center	12225		618	6 (16)	103 (40)	0 (0)	0.14%	37°31′5″N 95°49′11″W
Chetopa	13000		188	2 (5)	93 (36)	0 (0)	0.11%	37°30′28″N 95°34′14″W
Clifton	14250		414	4 (12)	93 (36)	0 (0)	0.53%	37°41′56″N 95°42′23″W
Colfax	14825		452	4 (10)	123 (47)	0 (0)	0.17%	37°40′55″N 95°36′20″W
Duck Creek	18800		103	1 (3)	93 (36)	0 (0)	0.23%	37°26′14″N 95°54′58″W
Fall River	22825		398	3 (8)	131 (51)	0 (0)	0.16%	37°32′21″N 95°55′33″W
Guilford	29200		205	2 (6)	93 (36)	0 (0)	0.06%	37°36′32″N 95°43′22″W
Neodesha	49675		583	6 (17)	90 (35)	0 (0)	0.52%	37°25′29″N 95°40′52″W
Newark	50200		226	2 (6)	92 (36)	0 (0)	0.18%	37°25′30″N 95°34′56″W
Pleasant Valley	56650		201	2 (4)	123 (47)	0 (0)	0.09%	37°36′25″N 95°36′21″W
Prairie	57425		118	2 (4)	78 (30)	0 (0)	0.28%	37°36′17″N 95°49′26″W
Talleyrand	69900		232	3 (7)	92 (36)	0 (0)	0.06%	37°25′19″N 95°48′25″W
Verdigris	73500		394	4 (10)	103 (40)	0 (0)	0.27%	37°39′29″N 95°53′51″W
Webster	76300		51	1 (2)	77 (30)	0 (0)	0.15%	37°42′0″N 95°50′1″W

== See also ==
- National Register of Historic Places listings in Wilson County, Kansas
