= Bernard Joseph Steffen =

American artist

- Born: November 24, 1907; Neodesha, Kansas, US
- Died: July 10, 1980 (aged 73); Flushing, New York, US
- Known for: Painter, printmaker

Bernard Joseph Steffen (1907 – 1980) was an American artist known for his lithographs. He was part of the American Scene and worked at the Federal Art Project of the Works Progress Administration.

== Biography ==
Steffen was born on November 24, 1907 in Neodesha, Kansas. He attended the Kansas City Art Institute and the Art Students League of New York. His teachers included Thomas Hart Benton.

He created lithographs for the New York Federal Art Project of the Works Progress Administration. In 1938 he painted the mural Neodesha’s First Inhabitants for the Neodesha Post Office. Steffen's work was included in 1944 Dallas Museum of Art exhibition of the National Serigraph Society. He was also included in the Whitney Museum of American Arts 1940 and 1942 Annual Exhibition Contemporary American Painting.

Steffen died on July 10, 1980, in Flushing, New York.

His work is in the collection of the Art Institute of Chicago, the Fine Arts Museums of San Francisco, the Library of Congress, the Metropolitan Museum of Art, the National Gallery of Art, the Pennsylvania Academy of the Fine Arts, the Smithsonian American Art Museum, the Whitney Museum of American Art. and the Worcester Art Museum.

== Gallery ==
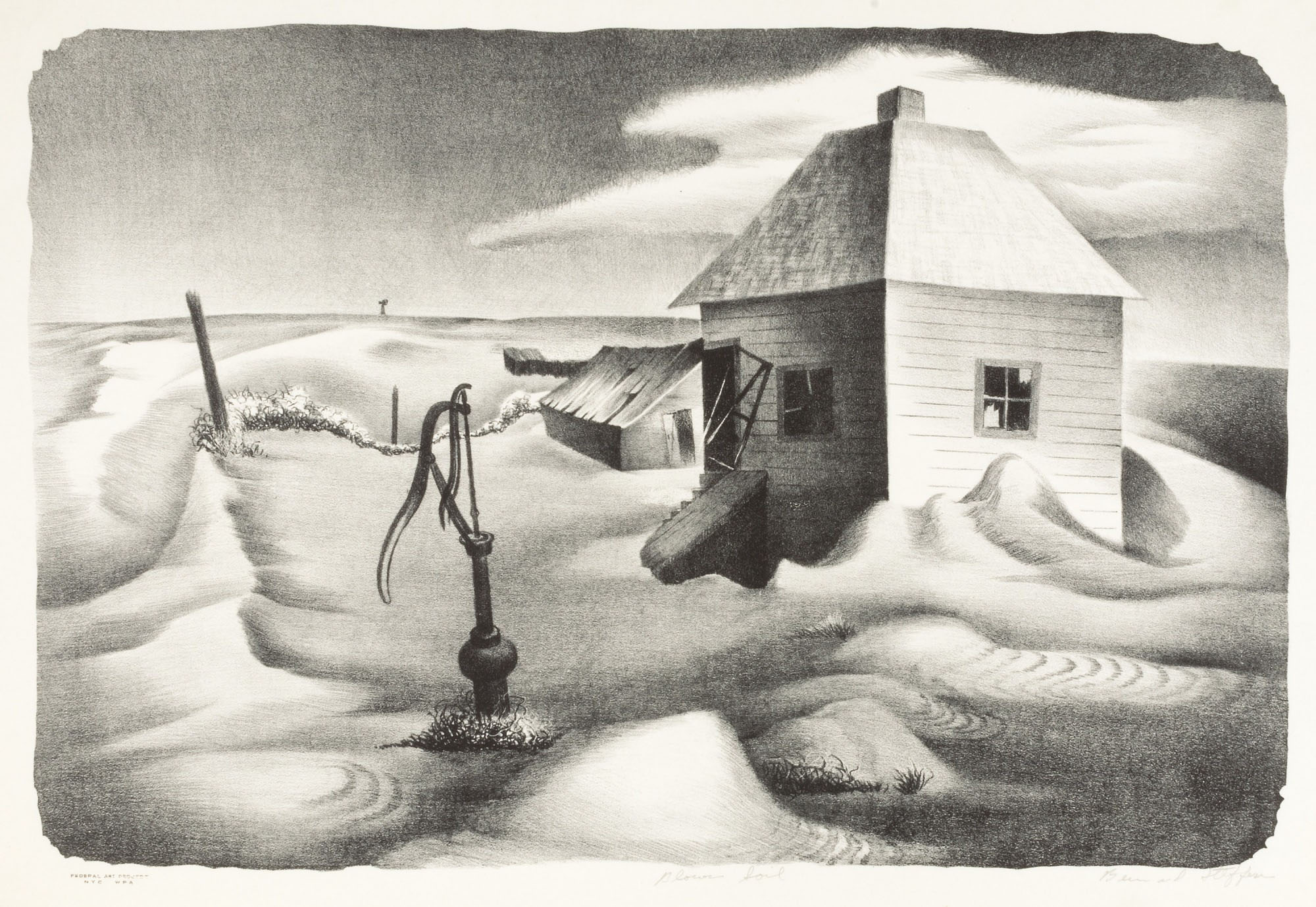
Blown Soil, 1930s

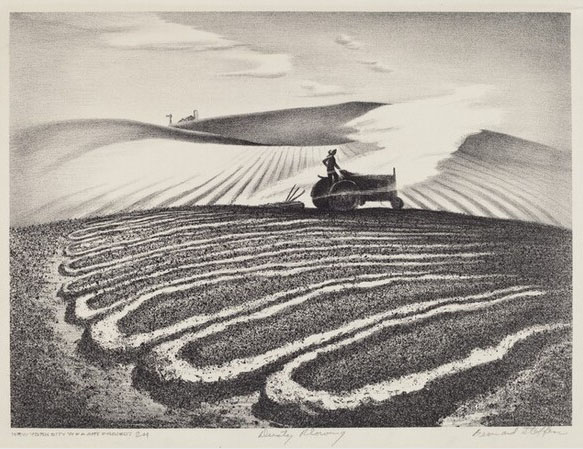
Dusty Plowing, c. 1939

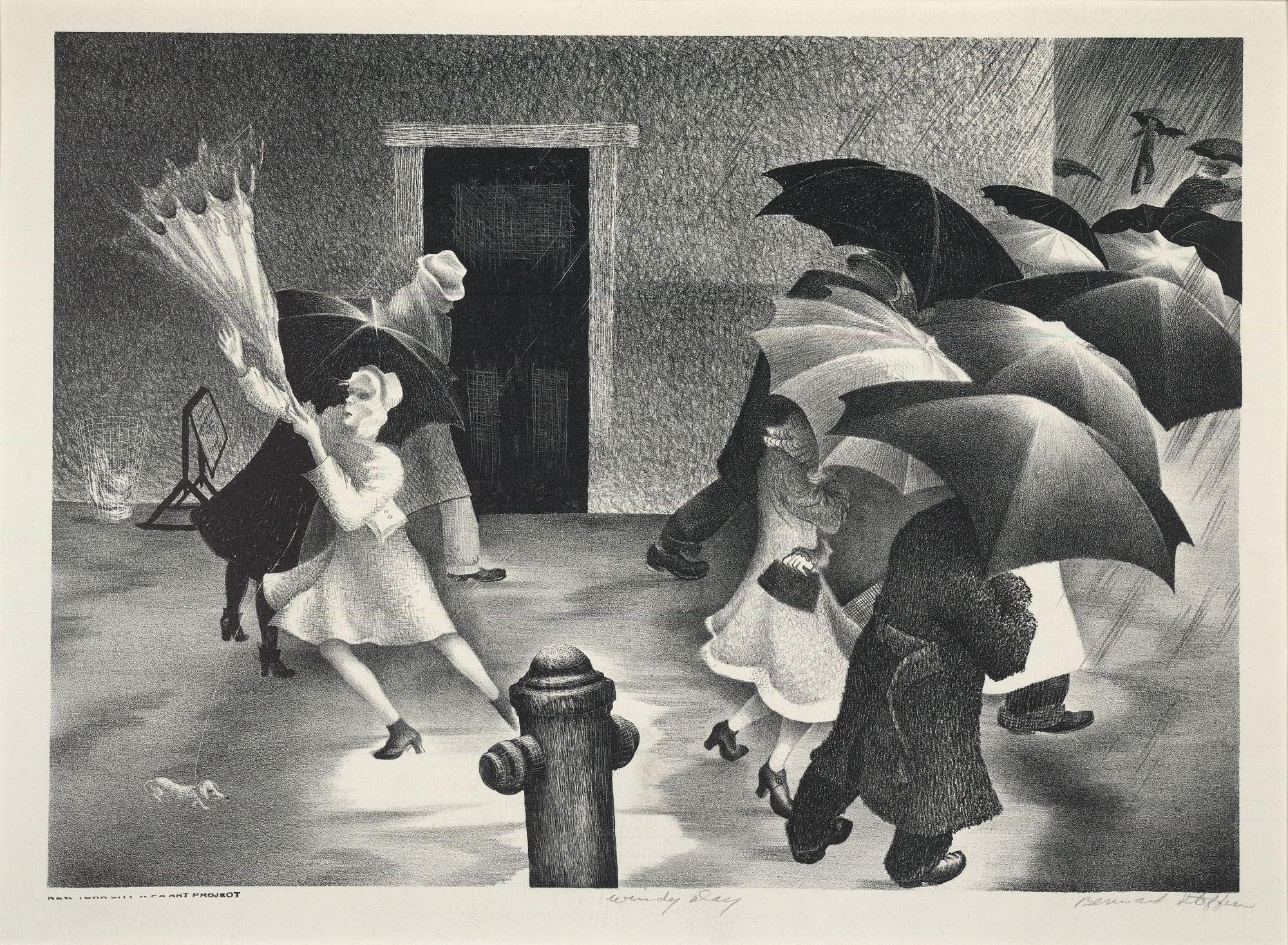
Windy Day, c. 1935-1943
