= Gold Dust Hotel =

- U.S. National Register of Historic Places
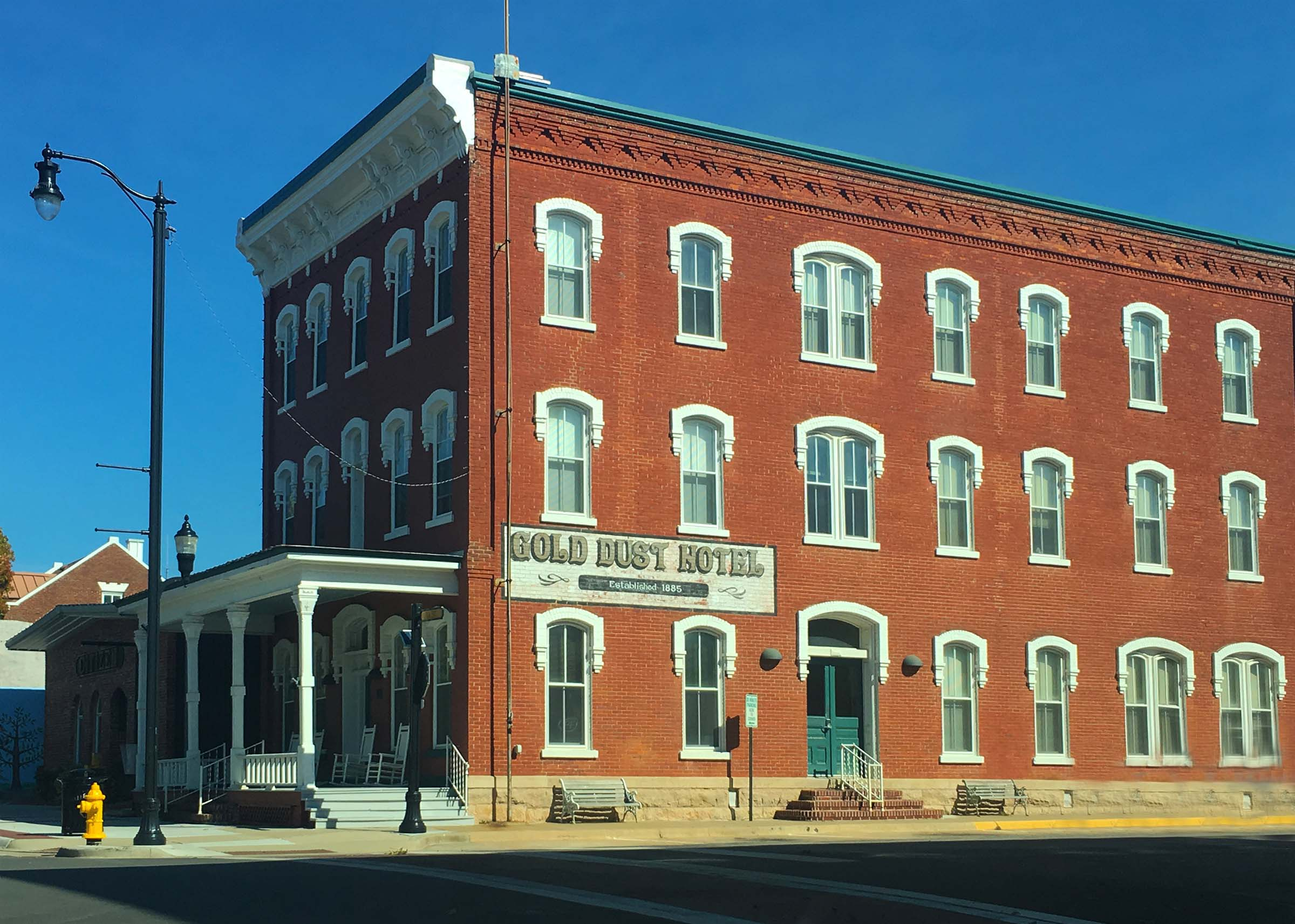
- Gold Dust Hotel in 2016

- Location within Kansas Location within the United States
- Location: 402 N. Seventh St., Fredonia, Kansas
- Coordinates: 37°32′02″N 95°49′33″W
- Area: Less than one acre
- Built: c. 1884–85
- Built by: Doney, J.W.
- Architects: Barton, John
- Architectural style: Italianate
- NRHP reference No.: 91001542
- Added to NRHP: November 1, 1991

The Gold Dust Hotel, located at 402 N. Seventh St. in Fredonia, Kansas, was built in c. 1884–85. It was listed on the National Register of Historic Places in 1991.

It is a three-story brick Italianate-style building. It has also been known as Hotel Cunningham, as Farris Hotel, and as Gold Dust Hotel and Apartments.

When it was completed in 1885, the Wilson County Citizen asserted:

The Gold Dust is without doubt as fine a hotel as can be found in Southern Kansas. It would be splendid hotel in a city of ten or twenty thousand inhabitants. It is not only a grand building externally but contains the most modern appointments and conveniences of first-class institutions of this kind and is furnished in all respects in a most elegant and comfortable manner. Its ventilation is perfect and not an important essential feature for a number one hotel has been omitted.
