= Kenneth Evett =

American artist (1913–2005)

Kenneth Evett (1913-May 28, 2005), also known as Kenneth Warnock Evett was an American artist.

He was born in Loveland, Colorado in 1913.

He died in Ithaca, New York in 2005.

A number of post offices containing his murals are listed on the National Register of Historic Places, with their significance being due to the murals. These include:

- US Post Office-Caldwell, 14 N. Main St. Caldwell, KS
- US Post Office-Horton, 825 1st Ave. E. Horton, KS
- US Post Office-Pawnee City, 703 G St. Pawnee City, NE

Evett also painted a series of three murals in the rotunda of the Nebraska State Capitol: The Labors of the Hand, The Labors of the Head and The Labors of the Heart.
