= Caldwell United States Post Office =

- US Post Office--Caldwell
- U.S. National Register of Historic Places
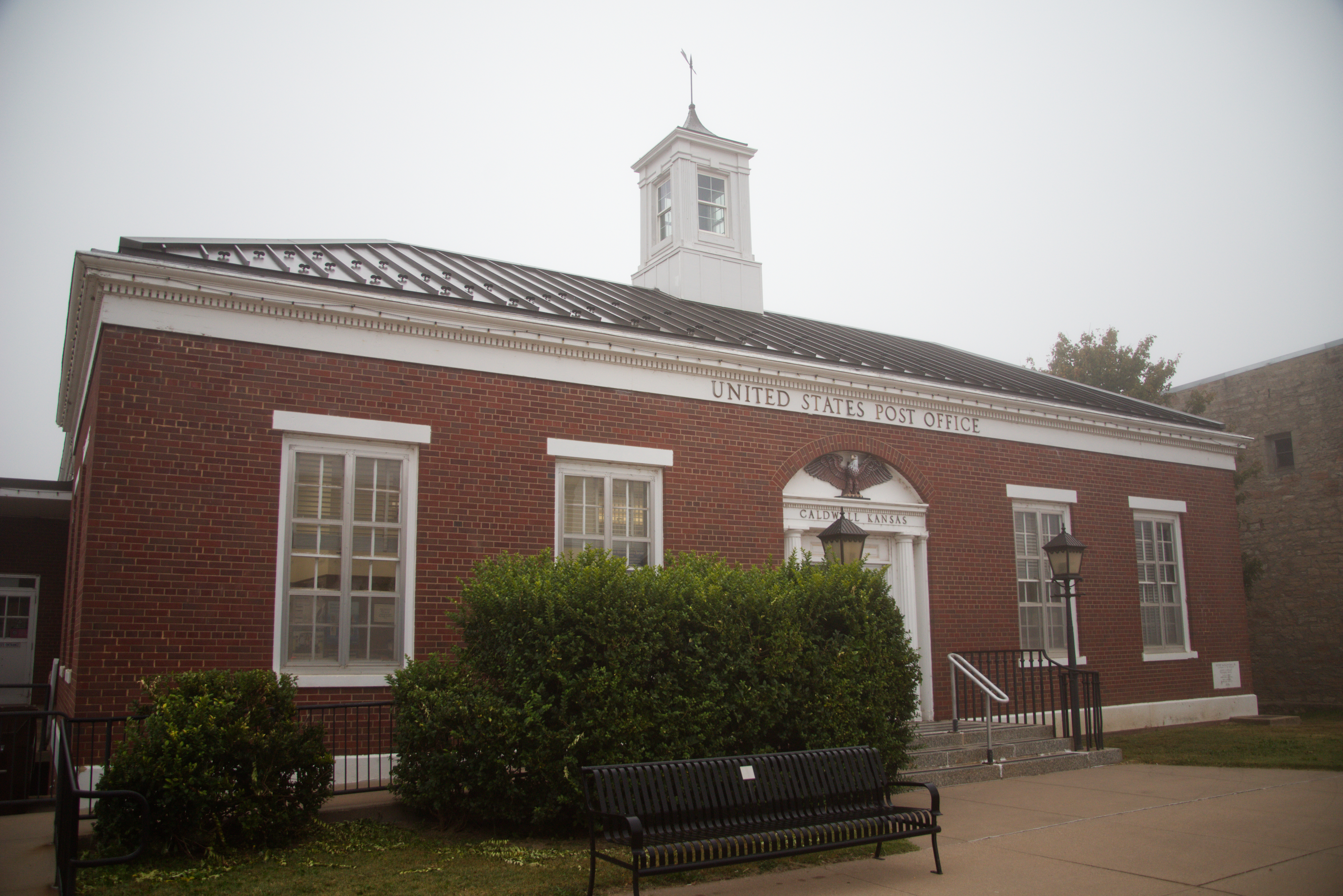
- Post Office Caldwell

- Location within Kansas Location within the United States
- Location: 14 N. Main St., Caldwell, Kansas
- Coordinates: 37°01′58″N 97°36′31″W
- Area: less than one acre
- Built: 1941
- Architect: Louis Simon
- Architectural style: Classical Revival
- MPS: Kansas Post Offices with Artwork, 1936--1942 MPS
- NRHP reference No.: 89001635
- Added to NRHP: October 17, 1989

The Caldwell United States Post Office, located at 14 N. Main St. in Caldwell, Kansas, was listed on the National Register of Historic Places in 1989. It is Classical Revival in style and was built in 1941.

It includes a tempura mural Cowboys Driving Cattle by artist Kenneth Evett.

It was listed on the National Register as US Post Office—Caldwell.
