= Neodesha United States Post Office =

- US Post Office—Neodesha
- U.S. National Register of Historic Places
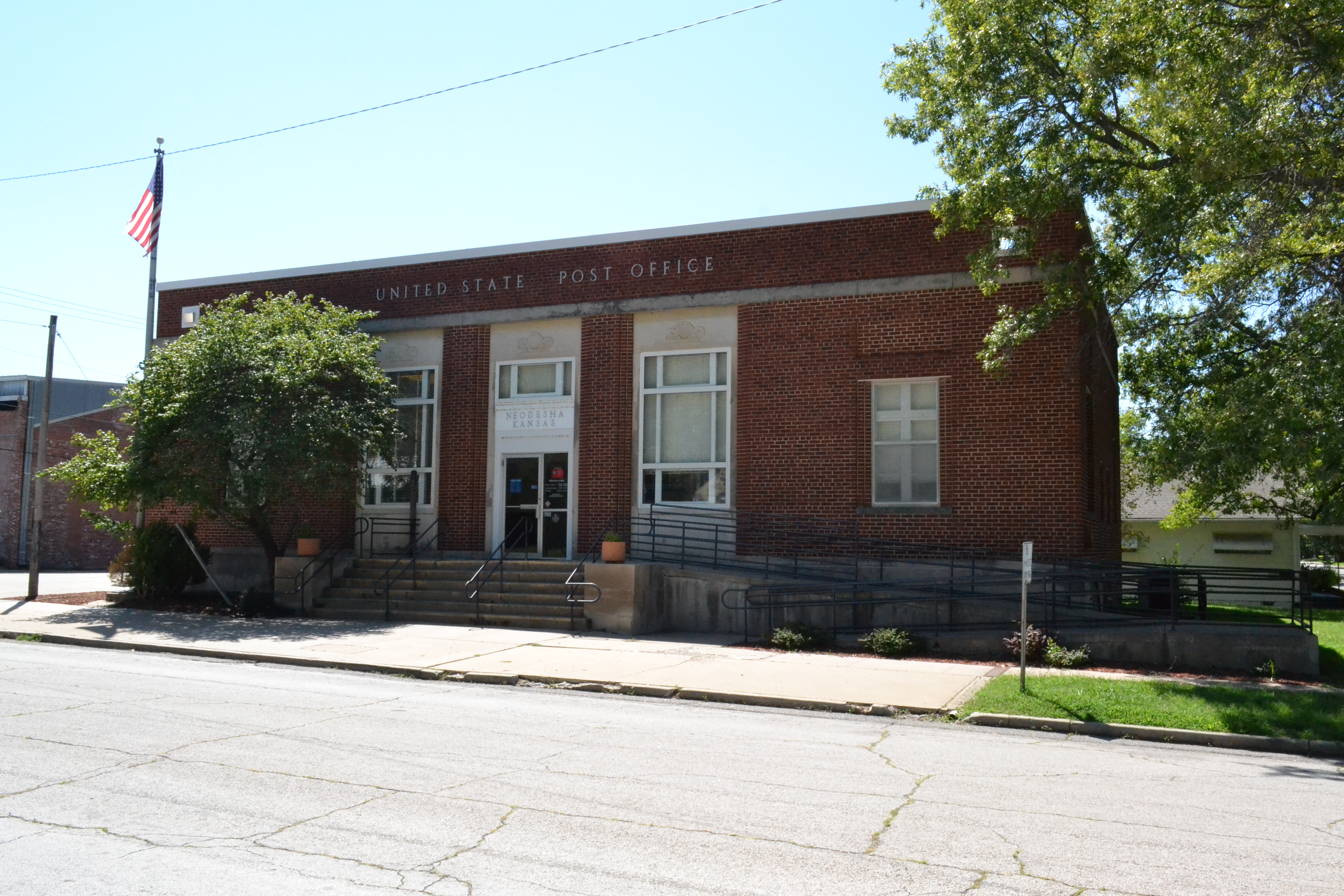
- US Post Office—Neodesha in 2017

- Location within Kansas Location within the United States
- Location: 123 N. Fifth St., Neodesha, Kansas
- Coordinates: 37°25′00″N 95°40′53″W
- Area: Less than one acre
- Built: 1938
- Architect: Louis Simon
- Architectural style: Classical Revival
- MPS: Kansas Post Offices with Artwork, 1936–1942 MPS
- NRHP reference No.: 89001647
- Added to NRHP: October 17, 1989

The Neodesha United States Post Office, located at 123 N. Fifth St. in Neodesha, Kansas, was built in 1938. It was listed on the National Register of Historic Places in 1989 as US Post Office—Neodesha.

It includes a mural by New York City artist Bernard J. Steffen titled Neodesha's First Inhabitants. The mural is a tempera on pressed wood board mural "that depicts the friendly relations between the Osage Indians of southeastern Kansas and the early white settlers. On the right side of the canvas Osage Chief Little Bear waves to Dr. T. Blakeslee, a physician responsible for much of the peacefulness between the two cultures."

The post office was deemed significant "for its historical association with the Treasury Department's Section program and for the artistic significance of the mural that it contains."
