= Oswego United States Post Office =

- US Post Office—Oswego
- U.S. National Register of Historic Places
- Oswego United States Post Office in 2026

- Location within Kansas Location within the United States
- Location: 819 4th St., Oswego, Kansas
- Coordinates: 37°10′04″N 95°06′38″W
- Area: Less than one acre
- Built: 1940
- Architects: Larter, Robert E.; Simon, Louis
- Architectural style: Classical Revival
- MPS: Kansas Post Offices with Artwork, 1936–1942 MPS
- NRHP reference No.: 89001648
- Added to NRHP: October 17, 1989

The Oswego United States Post Office in Oswego, Kansas, is listed on the National Register of Historic Places as US Post Office—Oswego, located at 819 4th Street. Built in 1940, it was listed on the National Register of Historic Places in 1989.

It is Classical Revival in style, with design attributed to Louis A. Simon. Originally it was 61 by 58 feet (19 m × 18 m) in plan; a 23 by 71 feet (7.0 m × 21.6 m) extension was added in 1971.

A WPA tempera on canvas mural by Robert E. Larter entitled Farm Life is displayed in the lobby that depicts the four seasons of farming life. The mural, installed on July 31, 1940, measures 12 feet 10 inches by 4 feet 6 inches. Federally commissioned murals were produced from 1934 to 1943 in the United States through the Section of Painting and Sculpture, later called the Section of Fine Arts, of the Treasury Department.
