= Brush Creek Bridge (Coyville, Kansas) =

- U.S. National Register of Historic Places
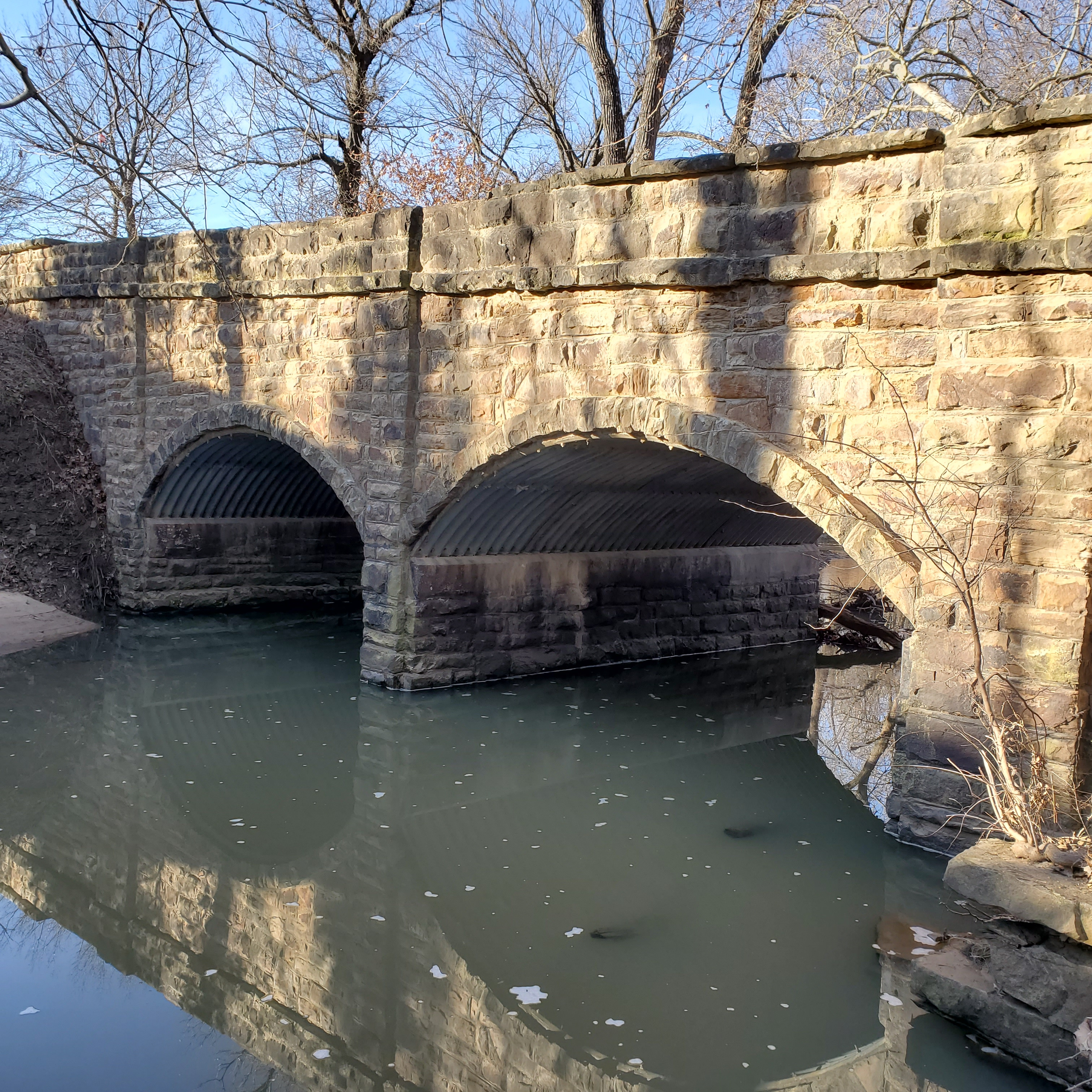

- Location within Kansas Location within the United States
- Nearest city: Coyville, Kansas
- Coordinates: 37°40′41″N 95°53′48″W
- Area: less than one acre
- Built: 1930
- Architectural style: Stone Arch
- MPS: Masonry Arch Bridges of Kansas TR
- NRHP reference No.: 85001419
- Added to NRHP: July 2, 1985

The Brush Creek Bridge, near Coyville, Kansas, was built in 1930. It was listed on the National Register of Historic Places in 1985.

It is located about .5 miles (0.80 km) south of Coyville, Kansas. It is an arch bridge which is 42 feet (13 m) long and 19.5 feet (5.9 m) wide curb to curb.
