= Fredonia, Kansas =

City in Wilson County, Kansas

- City and County seat
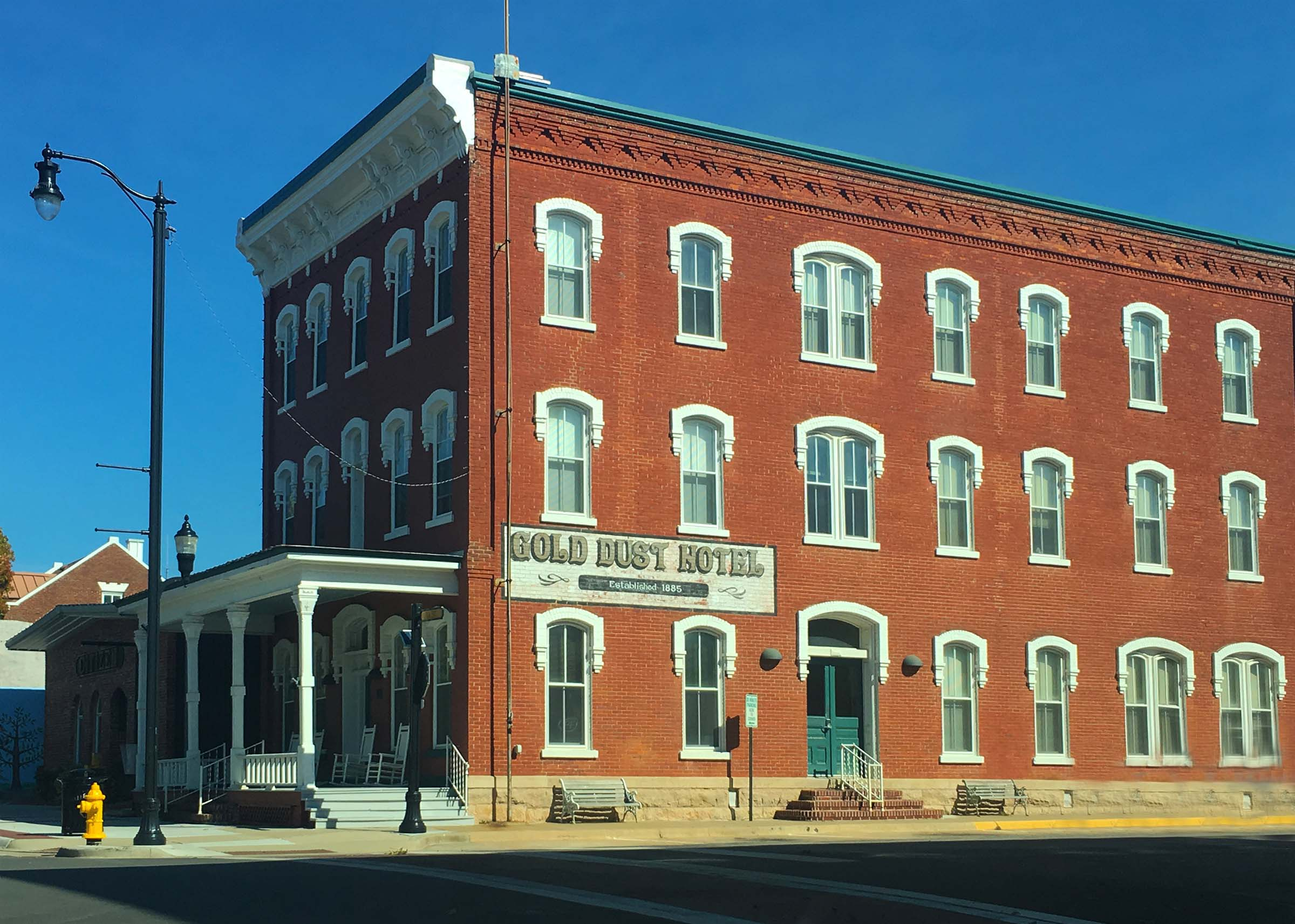
- Gold Dust Hotel (2016)

- Location within Wilson County and Kansas

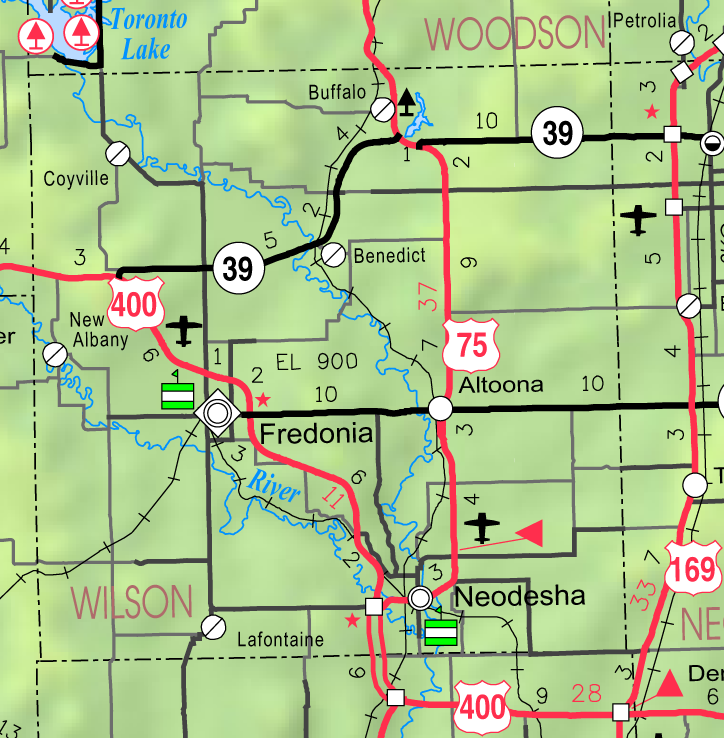
- KDOT map of Wilson County (legend)
- Coordinates: 37°32′2″N 95°49′36″W
- Country: United States
- State: Kansas
- County: Wilson
- Founded: 1860s
- Platted: 1868
- Incorporated: 1871
- Named for: Fredonia, New York

Area
  - Total: 2.45 sq mi (6.34 km^{2})
  - Land: 2.44 sq mi (6.32 km^{2})
  - Water: 0.0077 sq mi (0.02 km^{2})
- Elevation: 896 ft (273 m)

Population (2020)
  - Total: 2,151
  - Density: 881/sq mi (340/km^{2})
- Time zone: UTC-6 (CST)
  - Summer (DST): UTC-5 (CDT)
- ZIP Code: 66736
- Area code: 620
- FIPS code: 20-24575
- GNIS ID: 475082
- Website: fredoniaks.org

Fredonia is a city in and the county seat of Wilson County, Kansas, United States. As of the 2020 census, the population of the city was 2,151. The city was founded in 1868, and saw considerable expansion in the early 20th century, with a fossil fuel boom.

== History ==
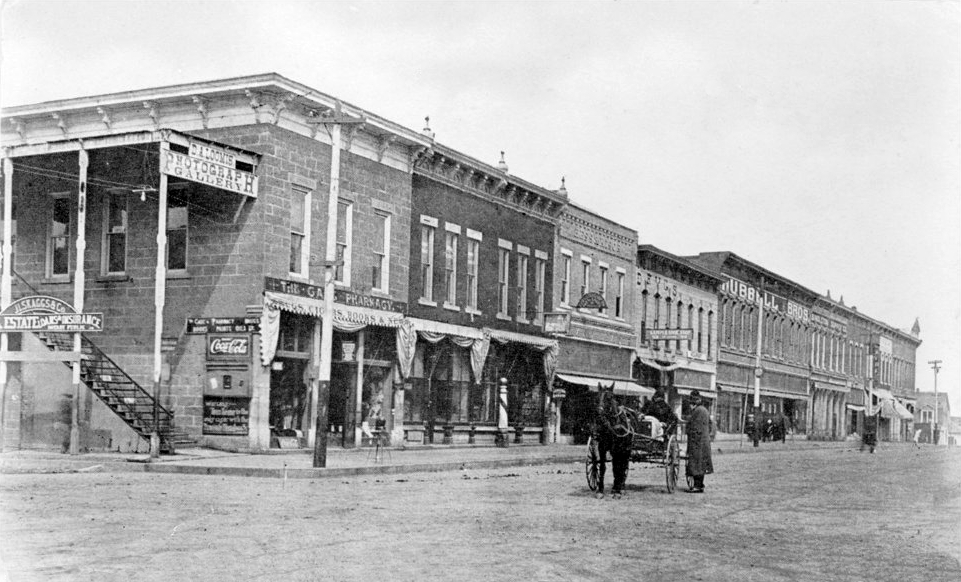
West side of town square, 1905

Fredonia was laid out in 1868 near a large hillock located along the St. Louis & San Francisco Railway in southeast Kansas. It was named after Fredonia, New York. The first building on the town site was a general store, erected in 1868, on the southwest corner of the town square, soon followed by a simple courthouse and hotel. The first post office was established in August 1868. The Gold Dust Hotel was completed in 1885.

It became a booming town with an emphasis on large industry. In May 1913, a large vein of semi-anthracite coal was discovered near the town. The coal that was found was "said to be of better quality than any other found in Kansas" at that time. With this discovery, it had the possibility of bringing in large amounts of money for the Wilson County area. A cement plant opened in Fredonia in 1907, supplying jobs to the community for more than 100 years, before it was closed in 2012. The economy in Fredonia was again boosted by the Archer Daniels Midland Company. The plant was obtained in 1928 and operated as a soybean processing facility and supplied many jobs for the growing industrial town. In March 2003 the plant announced it would close its Fredonia branch effective immediately. At one time, Fredonia was a hub for oil and natural gas development.

== Geography ==
According to the U.S. Census Bureau, the city has a total area of 2.45 square miles (6.35 km^{2}), of which 2.44 square miles (6.32 km^{2}) is land and 0.01 square miles (0.03 km^{2}) is water.

=== Climate ===
The area climate is characterized by hot, humid summers and generally mild to cool winters. According to the Köppen Climate Classification system, Fredonia has a humid subtropical climate, abbreviated "Cfa" on climate maps. On July 18, 1936, Fredonia set the Kansas record high temperature of 121 °F. This record was later tied by Alton, Kansas.

In late June and early July 2007, Fredonia was one of several communities in Southeast Kansas to experience record flooding. On the night of June 29, at least 10 inches of rainfall was recorded and additional rainfall fell over the weekend of June 30 and July 1. On the night of June 30, a Topeka television station reported on its website that 100 people in Wilson County had lost their homes due to the flooding.

Climate data for Fredonia, Kansas, 1991–2020 normals, extremes 1902–present
Month	Jan	Feb	Mar	Apr	May	Jun	Jul	Aug	Sep	Oct	Nov	Dec	Year
Record high °F (°C)	75 (24)	88 (31)	94 (34)	98 (37)	99 (37)	110 (43)	121 (49)	116 (47)	111 (44)	100 (38)	86 (30)	79 (26)	121 (49)
Mean maximum °F (°C)	66.9 (19.4)	69.4 (20.8)	79.3 (26.3)	84.4 (29.1)	88.9 (31.6)	93.9 (34.4)	99.9 (37.7)	99.4 (37.4)	95.7 (35.4)	86.6 (30.3)	76.9 (24.9)	67.2 (19.6)	101.6 (38.7)
Mean daily maximum °F (°C)	42.8 (6.0)	48.5 (9.2)	58.0 (14.4)	67.8 (19.9)	76.1 (24.5)	85.0 (29.4)	90.3 (32.4)	89.6 (32.0)	81.7 (27.6)	70.1 (21.2)	57.5 (14.2)	45.6 (7.6)	67.8 (19.9)
Daily mean °F (°C)	32.3 (0.2)	37.0 (2.8)	46.3 (7.9)	56.1 (13.4)	66.0 (18.9)	75.2 (24.0)	79.9 (26.6)	78.4 (25.8)	70.2 (21.2)	58.0 (14.4)	46.1 (7.8)	35.8 (2.1)	56.8 (13.8)
Mean daily minimum °F (°C)	21.5 (−5.8)	25.5 (−3.6)	34.6 (1.4)	44.3 (6.8)	55.9 (13.3)	65.3 (18.5)	69.4 (20.8)	67.2 (19.6)	58.6 (14.8)	45.9 (7.7)	34.7 (1.5)	25.6 (−3.6)	45.7 (7.6)
Mean minimum °F (°C)	3.9 (−15.6)	9.9 (−12.3)	17.8 (−7.9)	28.1 (−2.2)	38.9 (3.8)	52.5 (11.4)	59.7 (15.4)	55.9 (13.3)	42.1 (5.6)	28.2 (−2.1)	18.8 (−7.3)	7.5 (−13.6)	−0.5 (−18.1)
Record low °F (°C)	−21 (−29)	−15 (−26)	−7 (−22)	12 (−11)	26 (−3)	43 (6)	47 (8)	44 (7)	25 (−4)	14 (−10)	3 (−16)	−15 (−26)	−21 (−29)
Average precipitation inches (mm)	1.19 (30)	1.48 (38)	2.76 (70)	4.31 (109)	5.80 (147)	6.11 (155)	4.08 (104)	4.15 (105)	4.20 (107)	3.58 (91)	2.31 (59)	1.80 (46)	41.77 (1,061)
Average snowfall inches (cm)	2.9 (7.4)	0.8 (2.0)	0.4 (1.0)	0.1 (0.25)	0.0 (0.0)	0.0 (0.0)	0.0 (0.0)	0.0 (0.0)	0.0 (0.0)	0.0 (0.0)	0.0 (0.0)	2.3 (5.8)	6.5 (16.45)
Average precipitation days (≥ 0.01 in)	3.6	3.1	6.3	7.3	8.3	7.7	6.8	5.8	5.4	6.7	4.1	3.8	68.9
Average snowy days (≥ 0.1 in)	1.4	0.5	0.1	0.1	0.0	0.0	0.0	0.0	0.0	0.0	0.1	0.8	3.0
Source 1: NOAA
Source 2: National Weather Service

== Demographics ==
Historical population
Census	Pop.	Note	%±
1880	923		—
1890	1,515		64.1%
1900	1,650		8.9%
1910	3,040		84.2%
1920	3,954		30.1%
1930	3,446		−12.8%
1940	3,524		2.3%
1950	3,257		−7.6%
1960	3,233		−0.7%
1970	3,080		−4.7%
1980	3,047		−1.1%
1990	2,599		−14.7%
2000	2,600		0.0%
2010	2,482		−4.5%
2020	2,151		−13.3%
U.S. Decennial Census

=== 2020 census ===
As of the 2020 census, there were 2,151 people, 933 households, and 529 families in Fredonia. The population density was 881.9 per square mile (340.5/km^{2}). There were 1,168 housing units at an average density of 478.9 per square mile (184.9/km^{2}).

The median age was 40.8 years. 22.7% of residents were under the age of 18, 8.2% were from 18 to 24, 23.1% were from 25 to 44, 23.6% were from 45 to 64, and 22.4% were 65 years of age or older. For every 100 females, there were 92.2 males, and for every 100 females age 18 and over there were 89.2 males age 18 and over.

0.0% of residents lived in urban areas, while 100.0% lived in rural areas.

Of the 933 households, 26.8% had children under the age of 18 living in them. Of all households, 38.0% were married-couple households, 19.6% were households with a male householder and no spouse or partner present, and 34.9% were households with a female householder and no spouse or partner present. About 37.4% of all households were made up of individuals, and 20.7% had someone living alone who was 65 years of age or older. The average household size was 2.2 and the average family size was 2.8.

There were 1,168 housing units, of which 20.1% were vacant. The homeowner vacancy rate was 4.9% and the rental vacancy rate was 9.9%.

Racial composition as of the 2020 census
Race	Number	Percent
White	1,941	90.2%
Black or African American	1	0.0%
American Indian and Alaska Native	20	0.9%
Asian	14	0.7%
Native Hawaiian and Other Pacific Islander	1	0.0%
Some other race	23	1.1%
Two or more races	151	7.0%
Hispanic or Latino (of any race)	90	4.2%

Of the population, 88.98% was Non-Hispanic White.

=== Education ===
The percent of those with a bachelor's degree or higher was estimated to be 11.4% of the population.

=== Income and poverty ===
The 2016–2020 5-year American Community Survey estimates show that the median household income was $48,320 (with a margin of error of +/- $7,276) and the median family income was $67,946 (+/- $10,230). Males had a median income of $31,892 (+/- $7,668) versus $27,955 (+/- $6,673) for females. The median income for those above 16 years old was $31,037 (+/- $2,784). Approximately, 13.3% of families and 18.5% of the population were below the poverty line, including 28.4% of those under the age of 18 and 15.8% of those ages 65 or over.

=== 2010 census ===
As of the census of 2010, there were 2,482 people, 1,048 households, and 630 families residing in the city. The population density was 1,017.2 inhabitants per square mile (392.7/km^{2}). There were 1,255 housing units at an average density of 514.3 per square mile (198.6/km^{2}). The racial makeup of the city was 95.4% White, 0.1% African American, 1.6% Native American, 0.4% Asian, 0.1% Pacific Islander, 0.2% from other races, and 2.1% from two or more races. Hispanic or Latino of any race were 3.2% of the population.

There were 1,048 households, of which 30.4% had children under the age of 18 living with them, 45.9% were married couples living together, 9.6% had a female householder with no husband present, 4.6% had a male householder with no wife present, and 39.9% were non-families. 35.4% of all households were made up of individuals, and 20.2% had someone living alone who was 65 years of age or older. The average household size was 2.29 and the average family size was 2.97.

The median age in the city was 40.5 years. 24.8% of residents were under the age of 18; 7.4% were between the ages of 18 and 24; 22.8% were from 25 to 44; 23.5% were from 45 to 64; and 21.8% were 65 years of age or older. The gender makeup of the city was 48.1% male and 51.9% female.

== Economy ==
=== Top employers ===
List of top employers in Fredonia:

#	Employer	# of Employees
1	A-Lert	475
2	Fredonia USD 484	157
3	Fredonia Regional Hospital	109
4	Wilson County	100
5	Kansas Bank Note	65
6	Systech	45
7	RK Steel	44
8	City Of Fredonia	41
9	LaDow & Spohn	33

== Government ==
Fredonia is classified as a second class city of Kansas, thus the city has a mayor-commission body with an elected mayor and two elected commissioners. The commissioners are not vested with any supervisory powers over specific departments. The city commission appoints a city administrator, who is responsible for the day-to-day administration of all city officers and employees.

The mayor of Fredonia is Bob McKenney. Bill Jones and Brandon Tindle are the two elected commissioners. Kelley Zellner is the City Administrator of Fredonia.

== Education ==
The community is served by Fredonia USD 484 public school district. The mascot for each of the district's two schools is the yellowjacket.

== Notable people ==
- Marcus B. Bell, U.S. Army brigadier general
- George Malone, (1890–1961), US Senator of Nevada, World War I veteran, civil engineer.
- Don Myers, member of the Kansas House of Representatives.
- Benjamin Paulen, (1869–1961), 23rd governor of Kansas.
- Alaura Sharp, (born 1977), Head Coach, Appalachian State Mountaineers women's basketball
- Charles Stokes, (1902–1996), Member of the Washington House of Representatives
- Kendall Trainor, (born 1967), All-American placekicker for the University of Arkansas.
