= Neodesha, Kansas =

City in Wilson County, Kansas

- City
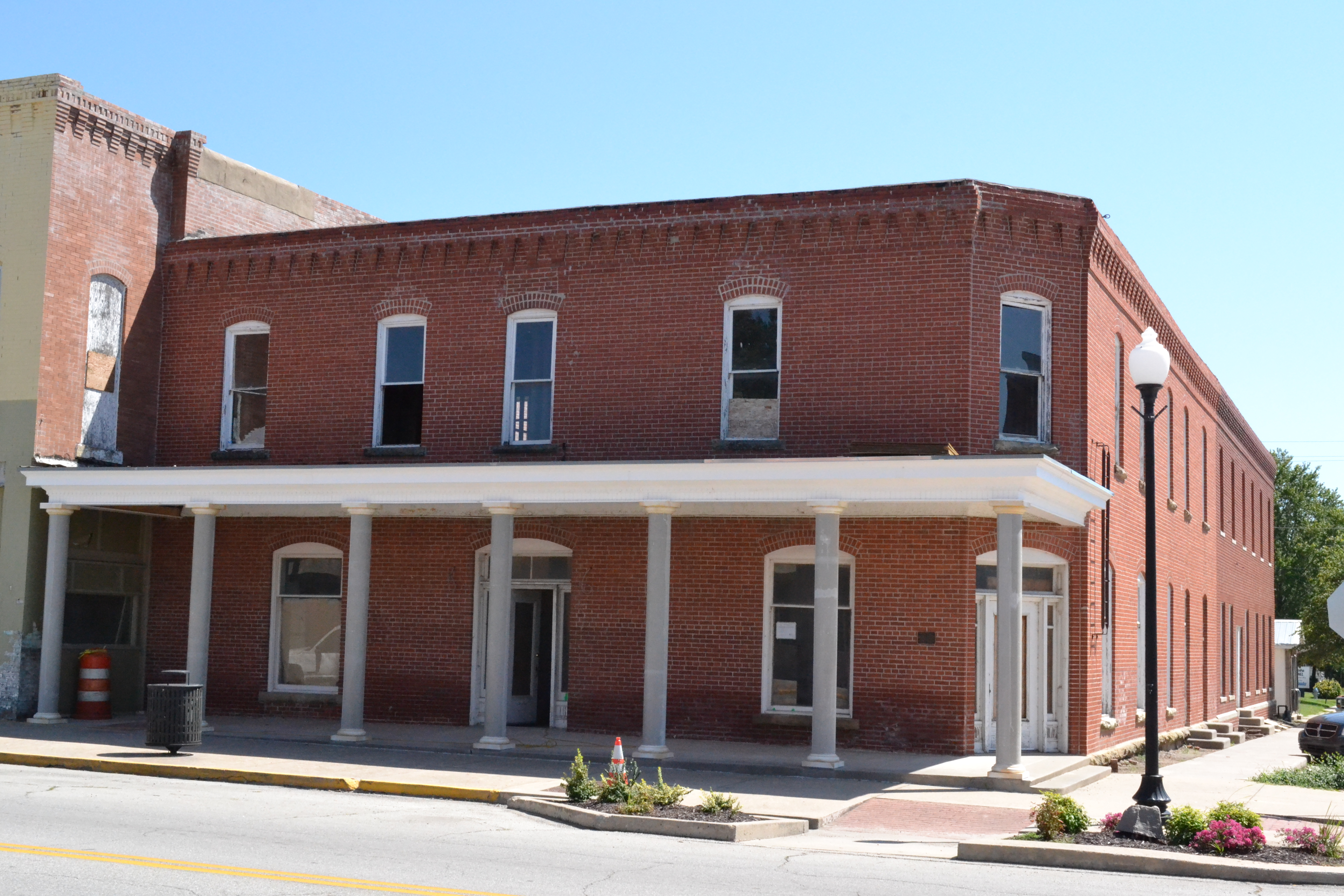
- Brown Hotel in Neodesha (2017)

- Location within Wilson County and Kansas

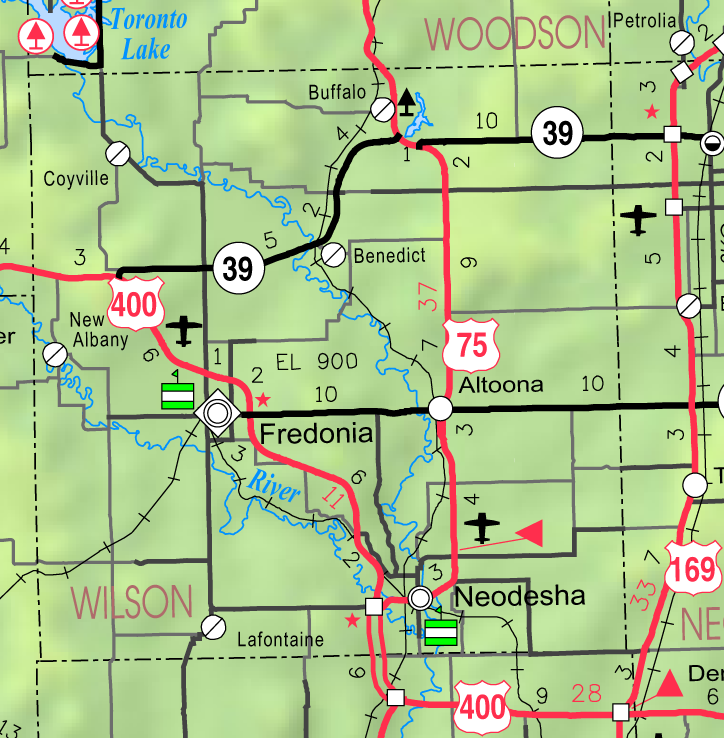
- KDOT map of Wilson County (legend)
- Coordinates: 37°25′25″N 95°40′52″W
- Country: United States
- State: Kansas
- County: Wilson
- Incorporated: 1871
- Named for: Ni-o-sho-de (indian)

Area
  - Total: 1.46 sq mi (3.78 km^{2})
  - Land: 1.41 sq mi (3.64 km^{2})
  - Water: 0.054 sq mi (0.14 km^{2})
- Elevation: 810 ft (250 m)

Population (2020)
  - Total: 2,275
  - Density: 1,620/sq mi (625/km^{2})
- Time zone: UTC-6 (CST)
  - Summer (DST): UTC-5 (CDT)
- ZIP Code: 66757
- Area code: 620
- FIPS code: 20-49650
- GNIS ID: 485067
- Website: neodesha.org

Neodesha /niːˈoʊdəʃeɪ/ is a city in Wilson County, Kansas, United States. As of the 2020 census, the population of the city was 2,275. The name is derived from the Osage word, Ni-o-sho-de, and is translated as The-Water-Is-Smoky-With-Mud.

== History ==
=== 19th century ===
The first settlers in the area that would eventually become Neodesha established a trading post in October 1867 to the northwest of the present town. They were allowed by the Osage Native Americans to establish a trading post on the Osage Diminished Reserve because the nearest trading post was over thirty miles away. After the Drum Creek Treaty had been signed by the Osage tribe in September 1870 and the tribe moved to Indian Territory, it opened the way for settlers to move to the area. Neodesha was incorporated March 2, 1871 and the original plat was filed with the U.S. Land Office in July 1871. Neodesha is an Osage name meaning "meeting of the waters".

The first railroad was built through Neodesha in 1879.

The first commercially successful oil well drilled in what would become the Mid-Continent Oil Field was drilled in Neodesha in 1892. Norman No. 1 Oil Well was located in the southeast part of the city. The Norman No. 1 Museum is near the location of the original wellsite.

=== 20th century ===
In 1943, German and Italian prisoners of World War II were brought to Kansas and other midwestern states as a means of solving the labor shortage caused by American men serving in the war effort. Large internment camps were established in Kansas: Camp Concordia, Camp Funston (at Fort Riley), Camp Phillips (at Salina, under Fort Riley). Fort Riley established 12 smaller branch camps, including Neodesha.

== Geography ==
Neodesha is located at 37°25′25″N 95°40′52″W (37.423512, -95.681185), along the Verdigris and Fall Rivers. According to the United States Census Bureau, the city has a total area of 1.39 square miles (3.60 km^{2}), of which 1.35 square miles (3.50 km^{2}) is land and 0.04 square miles (0.10 km^{2}) is water.

=== Climate ===
The climate in this area is characterized by hot, humid summers and generally mild to cool winters. According to the Köppen Climate Classification system, Neodesha has a humid subtropical climate, abbreviated "Cfa" on climate maps.

== Demographics ==
Historical population
Census	Pop.	Note	%±
1880	924		—
1890	1,528		65.4%
1900	1,772		16.0%
1910	2,872		62.1%
1920	3,943		37.3%
1930	3,381		−14.3%
1940	3,376		−0.1%
1950	3,723		10.3%
1960	3,594		−3.5%
1970	3,295		−8.3%
1980	3,414		3.6%
1990	2,837		−16.9%
2000	2,848		0.4%
2010	2,486		−12.7%
2020	2,275		−8.5%
U.S. Decennial Census

=== 2020 census ===
As of the 2020 census, Neodesha had a population of 2,275 people, with 971 households and 577 families. The population density was 1,619.2 per square mile (625.2/km^{2}). There were 1,170 housing units at an average density of 832.7 per square mile (321.5/km^{2}).

The median age was 40.2 years. 26.8% of residents were under the age of 18, 6.3% were from 18 to 24, 22.1% were from 25 to 44, 26.8% were from 45 to 64, and 18.0% were 65 years of age or older. For every 100 females there were 93.9 males, and for every 100 females age 18 and over there were 91.4 males age 18 and over.

There were 971 households, of which 29.0% had children under the age of 18 living in them. Of all households, 40.8% were married-couple households, 22.3% were households with a male householder and no spouse or partner present, and 29.7% were households with a female householder and no spouse or partner present. About 36.5% of all households were made up of individuals and 15.3% had someone living alone who was 65 years of age or older.

There were 1,170 housing units, of which 17.0% were vacant. The homeowner vacancy rate was 6.0% and the rental vacancy rate was 7.6%. 0.0% of residents lived in urban areas, while 100.0% lived in rural areas.

Racial composition as of the 2020 census
Race	Number	Percent
White	1,938	85.2%
Black or African American	11	0.5%
American Indian and Alaska Native	43	1.9%
Asian	7	0.3%
Native Hawaiian and Other Pacific Islander	0	0.0%
Some other race	26	1.1%
Two or more races	250	11.0%
Hispanic or Latino (of any race)	81	3.6%

White alone, not Hispanic or Latino residents made up 84.0% of the population.

=== Demographic estimates ===
The average household size was 2.2 and the average family size was 2.6. The percent of those with a bachelor's degree or higher was estimated to be 14.6% of the population.

=== Income and poverty ===
The 2016–2020 5-year American Community Survey estimates show that the median household income was $48,549 (with a margin of error of +/- $7,004) and the median family income was $61,442 (+/- $16,007). Males had a median income of $40,823 (+/- $6,760) versus $30,208 (+/- $12,131) for females. The median income for those above 16 years old was $35,188 (+/- $7,275). Approximately, 7.3% of families and 9.6% of the population were below the poverty line, including 4.6% of those under the age of 18 and 3.4% of those ages 65 or over.

=== 2010 census ===
As of the census of 2010, there were 2,486 people, 1,031 households, and 658 families residing in the city. The population density was 1,841.5 inhabitants per square mile (711.0/km^{2}). There were 1,204 housing units at an average density of 891.9 per square mile (344.4/km^{2}). The racial makeup of the city was 95.3% White, 0.4% African American, 1.1% Native American, 0.4% Asian, 0.6% from other races, and 2.1% from two or more races. Hispanic or Latino of any race were 2.9% of the population.

There were 1,031 households, of which 34.0% had children under the age of 18 living with them, 44.2% were married couples living together, 14.0% had a female householder with no husband present, 5.6% had a male householder with no wife present, and 36.2% were non-families. 32.1% of all households were made up of individuals, and 14.6% had someone living alone who was 65 years of age or older. The average household size was 2.37 and the average family size was 2.96.

The median age in the city was 39.2 years. 27% of residents were under the age of 18; 7.3% were between the ages of 18 and 24; 22.5% were from 25 to 44; 26.8% were from 45 to 64; and 16.5% were 65 years of age or older. The gender makeup of the city was 46.7% male and 53.3% female.

== Education ==
The community is served by Neodesha USD 461 public school district. The Neodesha High School mascot is Bluestreaks.

== Notable people ==
- Dorothy DeLay, violin instructor at Juilliard.
- Lyle Goodhue, scientist and aerosol pioneer, former Director of Research at Airosol Inc.
- Maggie McIntosh, Maryland State Legislator
- Grimes Poznikov, street performer in San Francisco, California
- Clay Whitehead, director of the White House Office of Telecommunications Policy during Nixon Administration
