= Medway Township, Kansas =

Medway Township
- Township
- Location in Hamilton County
- Coordinates: 38°02′40″N 101°52′20″W
- Country: United States
- State: Kansas
- County: Hamilton

Area
  - Total: 108.17 sq mi (280.16 km^{2})
  - Land: 107.86 sq mi (279.36 km^{2})
  - Water: 0.31 sq mi (0.8 km^{2}) 0.29%
- Elevation: 3,448 ft (1,051 m)

Population (2020)
  - Total: 40
  - Density: 0.37/sq mi (0.14/km^{2})
- GNIS feature ID: 0485271

Medway Township is a township in Hamilton County, Kansas, United States. As of the 2020 census, its population was 40. It was previously known as Melvern Township.

== Geography ==
Medway Township covers an area of 108.17 square miles (280.16 square kilometers); of this, 0.31 square miles (0.8 square kilometers) or 0.29 percent is water. The streams of East Bridge Creek and Plum Creek run through this township.

=== Communities ===
- Medway

(This list is based on USGS data and may include former settlements.)

=== Adjacent townships ===
- Liberty Township (northeast)
- Richland Township (northeast)
- Syracuse Township (southeast)
- Bear Creek Township (south)
- Coolidge Township (west)

=== Major highway ===
- U.S. Route 50

=== Airports and landing strips ===
- Lewis Airport
