= West Hibbard Township, Kansas =

West Hibbard Township
- Township
- Location in Kearny County
- Coordinates: 38°10′10″N 101°25′55″W
- Country: United States
- State: Kansas
- County: Kearny

Area
  - Total: 155.38 sq mi (402.42 km^{2})
  - Land: 155.38 sq mi (402.42 km^{2})
  - Water: 0 sq mi (0 km^{2}) 0%
- Elevation: 3,330 ft (1,015 m)

Population (2020)
  - Total: 64
  - Density: 0.41/sq mi (0.16/km^{2})
- GNIS feature ID: 0485246

West Hibbard Township is a township in Kearny County, Kansas, United States. As of the 2020 census, its population was 64.

== Geography ==
West Hibbard Township covers an area of 155.37 square miles (402.42 square kilometers).

=== Adjacent townships ===
- Leoti Township, Wichita County (north)
- East Hibbard Township (east)
- Lakin Township (southeast)
- Hartland Township (south)
- Kendall Township, Hamilton County (southwest)
- Richland Township, Hamilton County (west)
