= Kendall Township =

Kendall Township may refer to the following townships in the United States:

- Kendall Township, Kendall County, Illinois
- Kendall Township, Hamilton County, Kansas
- Kendall Township, Kearny County, Kansas
