= Hartland Township, Kansas =

Hartland Township
- Township
- Location in Kearny County
- Coordinates: 38°00′33″N 101°25′55″W
- Country: United States
- State: Kansas
- County: Kearny

Area
  - Total: 149.73 sq mi (387.81 km^{2})
  - Land: 149.70 sq mi (387.71 km^{2})
  - Water: 0.039 sq mi (0.1 km^{2}) 0.03%
- Elevation: 3,307 ft (1,008 m)

Population (2020)
  - Total: 143
  - Density: 0.955/sq mi (0.369/km^{2})
- GNIS feature ID: 0485278

Hartland Township is a township in Kearny County, Kansas, United States. As of the 2020 census, its population was 143.

== Geography ==
Hartland Township covers an area of 149.73 square miles (387.81 square kilometers); of this, 0.04 square miles (0.1 square kilometers) or 0.03 percent is water. The stream of Sand Creek runs through this township.

=== Communities ===
- Hartland
- Sutton

(This list is based on USGS data and may include former settlements.)

=== Adjacent townships ===
- West Hibbard Township (north)
- East Hibbard Township (northeast)
- Lakin Township (east)
- Southside Township (southeast)
- Kendall Township (south)
- Kendall Township, Hamilton County (west)

=== Cemeteries ===
The township contains one cemetery, Hartland.

=== Major highways ===
- U.S. Route 50
