= Southside Township =

Southside Township may refer to the following townships in the United States:

- Southside Township, Kearny County, Kansas
- Southside Township, Wright County, Minnesota
