= Kendall Township, Kearny County, Kansas =

Kendall Township
- Township
- Location in Kearny County
- Coordinates: 37°48′50″N 101°26′19″W
- Country: United States
- State: Kansas
- County: Kearny

Area
  - Total: 190.77 sq mi (494.09 km^{2})
  - Land: 190.76 sq mi (494.07 km^{2})
  - Water: 0.0077 sq mi (0.02 km^{2}) 0%
- Elevation: 3,150 ft (960 m)

Population (2020)
  - Total: 109
  - Density: 0.571/sq mi (0.221/km^{2})
- GNIS feature ID: 0471585

Kendall Township is a township in Kearny County, Kansas, United States. As of the 2020 census, its population was 109.

== Geography ==
Kendall Township covers an area of 190.77 square miles (494.09 square kilometers); of this, 0.01 square miles (0.02 square kilometers) or 0 percent is water. Lakes in this township include Clear Lake.

=== Adjacent townships ===
- Hartland Township (north)
- Lakin Township (northeast)
- Southside Township (northeast)
- Ivanhoe Township, Finney County (east)
- Dudley Township, Haskell County (southeast)
- Sherman Township, Grant County (south)
- Big Bow Township, Stanton County (southwest)
- Lamont Township, Hamilton County (west)
- Kendall Township, Hamilton County (northwest)

=== Major highways ===
- K-25

=== Airports and landing strips ===
- Eveleigh Farms Airport
- Morgan Farms Airport
