= 1964 United States presidential election in Kansas =

- November 3, 1964

Nominee	Lyndon B. Johnson	Barry Goldwater
Party	Democratic	Republican
Home state	Texas	Arizona
Running mate	Hubert Humphrey	William E. Miller
Electoral vote	7	0
Popular vote	464,028	386,579
Percentage	54.09%	45.06%
County results
Johnson
40–50%
50–60%
60–70%
Goldwater
40–50%
50–60%
60–70%
President before election
Lyndon B. Johnson
Democratic
Elected President
Lyndon B. Johnson
Democratic

The 1964 United States presidential election in Kansas took place on November 3, 1964, as part of the 1964 United States presidential election. Voters chose seven representatives, or electors, to the Electoral College, who voted for president and vice president.

Kansas was won by incumbent President Lyndon B. Johnson (D–Texas), with 54.09 percent of the popular vote, against Senator Barry Goldwater (R–Arizona), with 45.06 percent of the popular vote.

As of the 2024 presidential election, this is the only presidential race since 1936 where Kansas voted Democrat, and the last time the Democratic presidential nominee won any of the following counties: Allen, Barber, Barton, Bourbon, Clark, Comanche, Cowley, Ellsworth, Franklin, Geary, Gove, Grant, Harvey, Haskell, Kearny, Lane, Lyon, McPherson, Montgomery, Morton, Nemaha, Neosho, Osage, Ottawa, Pratt, Russell, Saline, Sedgwick, Sheridan, Sherman, Stanton, Stevens, Thomas and Trego.

To date Johnson's 54.09 percent remains the best Democratic presidential performance in Kansas history, although the margin is smaller than Franklin Roosevelt's win in 1932.

== Results ==
Electoral results
Presidential candidate	Party	Home state	Popular vote		Electoral vote	Running mate		
Presidential candidate	Party	Home state	Count	Percentage	Electoral vote	Vice-presidential candidate	Home state	Electoral vote
Lyndon B. Johnson	Democrat	Texas	464,028	54.09%	7	Hubert H. Humphrey	Minnesota	7
Barry M. Goldwater	Republican	Arizona	386,579	45.06%	0	William E. Miller	New York	0
E. Harold Munn	Prohibition	Michigan	5,393	0.63%	0	—	—	0
Eric Hass	Labor	California	1,901	0.22%	0	Henning A. Blomen	Massachusetts	0
Total			857,901	100%	7			7
Needed to win					270			270

=== Results by county ===
County	Lyndon B. Johnson Democratic		Barry Goldwater Republican		E. Harold Munn Prohibition		Eric Hass Labor		Margin		Total votes cast
County	#	%	#	%	#	%	#	%	#	%	Total votes cast
Allen	3,369	53.89%	2,841	45.44%	30	0.48%	12	0.19%	528	8.45%	6,252
Anderson	2,058	54.44%	1,692	44.76%	16	0.42%	14	0.37%	366	9.68%	3,780
Atchison	5,037	61.21%	3,147	38.24%	24	0.29%	21	0.26%	1,890	22.97%	8,229
Barber	1,845	50.91%	1,758	48.51%	11	0.30%	10	0.28%	87	2.40%	3,624
Barton	7,340	60.06%	4,826	39.49%	41	0.34%	14	0.11%	2,514	20.57%	12,221
Bourbon	3,980	54.35%	3,290	44.93%	40	0.55%	13	0.18%	690	9.42%	7,323
Brown	2,386	42.33%	3,213	57.01%	26	0.46%	11	0.20%	-827	-14.68%	5,636
Butler	9,061	58.34%	6,364	40.97%	76	0.49%	31	0.20%	2,697	17.37%	15,532
Chase	886	49.41%	902	50.31%	5	0.28%	0	0.00%	-16	-0.90%	1,793
Chautauqua	1,163	44.05%	1,463	55.42%	11	0.42%	3	0.11%	-300	-11.37%	2,640
Cherokee	5,720	60.23%	3,730	39.28%	29	0.31%	18	0.19%	1,990	20.95%	9,497
Cheyenne	886	43.43%	1,147	56.23%	6	0.29%	1	0.05%	-261	-12.80%	2,040
Clark	881	52.91%	777	46.67%	6	0.36%	1	0.06%	104	6.24%	1,665
Clay	1,806	37.06%	3,030	62.18%	23	0.47%	14	0.29%	-1,224	-25.12%	4,873
Cloud	3,314	54.84%	2,680	44.35%	35	0.58%	14	0.23%	634	10.49%	6,043
Coffey	1,594	44.20%	1,998	55.41%	9	0.25%	5	0.14%	-404	-11.21%	3,606
Comanche	818	53.67%	694	45.54%	4	0.26%	8	0.52%	124	8.13%	1,524
Cowley	7,591	51.30%	7,092	47.93%	96	0.65%	18	0.12%	499	3.37%	14,797
Crawford	10,282	61.78%	6,286	37.77%	41	0.25%	35	0.21%	3,996	24.01%	16,644
Decatur	1,314	48.45%	1,382	50.96%	9	0.33%	7	0.26%	-68	-2.51%	2,712
Dickinson	4,070	46.00%	4,704	53.17%	51	0.58%	22	0.25%	-634	-7.17%	8,847
Doniphan	1,856	48.54%	1,952	51.05%	9	0.24%	7	0.18%	-96	-2.51%	3,824
Douglas	9,416	54.26%	7,825	45.09%	77	0.44%	35	0.20%	1,591	9.17%	17,353
Edwards	1,427	60.03%	932	39.21%	12	0.50%	6	0.25%	495	20.82%	2,377
Elk	994	43.73%	1,267	55.74%	10	0.44%	2	0.09%	-273	-12.01%	2,273
Ellis	5,553	69.24%	2,440	30.42%	13	0.16%	14	0.17%	3,113	38.82%	8,020
Ellsworth	2,118	59.88%	1,406	39.75%	8	0.23%	5	0.14%	712	20.13%	3,537
Finney	3,639	61.86%	2,201	37.41%	32	0.54%	11	0.19%	1,438	24.45%	5,883
Ford	5,221	59.59%	3,481	39.73%	36	0.41%	23	0.26%	1,740	19.86%	8,761
Franklin	4,410	53.64%	3,725	45.31%	76	0.92%	10	0.12%	685	8.33%	8,221
Geary	3,419	59.51%	2,259	39.32%	54	0.94%	13	0.23%	1,160	20.19%	5,745
Gove	1,022	56.37%	774	42.69%	16	0.88%	1	0.06%	248	13.68%	1,813
Graham	1,193	49.54%	1,194	49.58%	15	0.62%	6	0.25%	-1	-0.04%	2,408
Grant	1,023	57.63%	727	40.96%	18	1.01%	7	0.39%	296	16.67%	1,775
Gray	1,136	63.36%	643	35.86%	13	0.73%	1	0.06%	493	27.50%	1,793
Greeley	469	54.16%	388	44.80%	7	0.81%	2	0.23%	81	9.36%	866
Greenwood	2,048	42.66%	2,717	56.59%	26	0.54%	10	0.21%	-669	-13.93%	4,801
Hamilton	726	51.09%	685	48.21%	10	0.70%	0	0.00%	41	2.88%	1,421
Harper	1,813	47.59%	1,969	51.68%	23	0.60%	5	0.13%	-156	-4.09%	3,810
Harvey	5,306	50.95%	4,979	47.81%	118	1.13%	12	0.12%	327	3.14%	10,415
Haskell	820	58.20%	570	40.45%	15	1.06%	4	0.28%	250	17.75%	1,409
Hodgeman	821	57.25%	607	42.33%	4	0.28%	2	0.14%	214	14.92%	1,434
Jackson	1,971	45.46%	2,334	53.83%	23	0.53%	8	0.18%	-363	-8.37%	4,336
Jefferson	2,066	46.06%	2,380	53.07%	21	0.47%	18	0.40%	-314	-7.01%	4,485
Jewell	1,601	45.29%	1,895	53.61%	31	0.88%	8	0.23%	-294	-8.32%	3,535
Johnson	31,213	45.12%	37,672	54.46%	203	0.29%	91	0.13%	-6,459	-9.34%	69,179
Kearny	737	56.05%	563	42.81%	13	0.99%	2	0.15%	174	13.24%	1,315
Kingman	2,226	53.32%	1,917	45.92%	25	0.60%	7	0.17%	309	7.40%	4,175
Kiowa	970	45.54%	1,135	53.29%	25	1.17%	0	0.00%	-165	-7.75%	2,130
Labette	6,208	56.12%	4,761	43.04%	54	0.49%	39	0.35%	1,447	13.08%	11,062
Lane	773	56.42%	586	42.77%	8	0.58%	3	0.22%	187	13.65%	1,370
Leavenworth	7,479	57.14%	5,544	42.36%	43	0.33%	23	0.18%	1,935	14.78%	13,089
Lincoln	1,316	48.69%	1,373	50.80%	13	0.48%	1	0.04%	-57	-2.11%	2,703
Linn	1,725	46.89%	1,939	52.70%	13	0.35%	2	0.05%	-214	-5.81%	3,679
Logan	957	49.30%	967	49.82%	15	0.77%	2	0.10%	-10	-0.52%	1,941
Lyon	6,197	54.07%	5,184	45.23%	70	0.61%	11	0.10%	1,013	8.84%	11,462
Marion	2,792	44.03%	3,481	54.90%	66	1.04%	2	0.03%	-689	-10.87%	6,341
Marshall	3,334	48.87%	3,432	50.31%	52	0.76%	4	0.06%	-98	-1.44%	6,822
McPherson	5,173	52.65%	4,483	45.62%	161	1.64%	9	0.09%	690	7.03%	9,826
Meade	1,179	47.31%	1,290	51.77%	21	0.84%	2	0.08%	-111	-4.46%	2,492
Miami	4,620	61.03%	2,907	38.40%	35	0.46%	8	0.11%	1,713	22.63%	7,570
Mitchell	1,898	48.92%	1,951	50.28%	26	0.67%	5	0.13%	-53	-1.36%	3,880
Montgomery	8,853	50.83%	8,437	48.44%	104	0.60%	22	0.13%	416	2.39%	17,416
Morris	1,605	48.30%	1,683	50.65%	27	0.81%	8	0.24%	-78	-2.35%	3,323
Morton	938	60.09%	609	39.01%	11	0.70%	3	0.19%	329	21.08%	1,561
Nemaha	3,260	57.36%	2,391	42.07%	28	0.49%	4	0.07%	869	15.29%	5,683
Neosho	4,795	57.80%	3,458	41.68%	33	0.40%	10	0.12%	1,337	16.12%	8,296
Ness	1,562	59.73%	1,034	39.54%	16	0.61%	3	0.11%	528	20.19%	2,615
Norton	1,449	38.78%	2,245	60.09%	37	0.99%	5	0.13%	-796	-21.31%	3,736
Osage	2,737	50.13%	2,681	49.10%	33	0.60%	9	0.16%	56	1.03%	5,460
Osborne	1,659	48.78%	1,700	49.99%	37	1.09%	5	0.15%	-41	-1.21%	3,401
Ottawa	1,535	50.29%	1,491	48.85%	18	0.59%	8	0.26%	44	1.44%	3,052
Pawnee	2,577	63.25%	1,468	36.03%	29	0.71%	0	0.00%	1,109	27.22%	4,074
Phillips	1,804	45.10%	2,164	54.10%	30	0.75%	2	0.05%	-360	-9.00%	4,000
Pottawatomie	2,432	47.97%	2,606	51.40%	30	0.59%	2	0.04%	-174	-3.43%	5,070
Pratt	2,594	50.58%	2,493	48.61%	34	0.66%	8	0.16%	101	1.97%	5,129
Rawlins	959	42.41%	1,292	57.14%	8	0.35%	2	0.09%	-333	-14.73%	2,261
Reno	14,936	62.30%	8,829	36.83%	194	0.81%	14	0.06%	6,107	25.47%	23,973
Republic	2,222	47.54%	2,414	51.65%	32	0.68%	6	0.13%	-192	-4.11%	4,674
Rice	3,665	60.10%	2,390	39.19%	39	0.64%	4	0.07%	1,275	20.91%	6,098
Riley	5,597	46.12%	6,396	52.70%	122	1.01%	22	0.18%	-799	-6.58%	12,137
Rooks	1,923	49.01%	1,985	50.59%	10	0.25%	6	0.15%	-62	-1.58%	3,924
Rush	1,778	61.29%	1,098	37.85%	20	0.69%	5	0.17%	680	23.44%	2,901
Russell	2,505	50.33%	2,435	48.93%	30	0.60%	7	0.14%	70	1.40%	4,977
Saline	9,725	59.45%	6,533	39.94%	73	0.45%	26	0.16%	3,192	19.51%	16,357
Scott	1,016	46.67%	1,143	52.50%	14	0.64%	4	0.18%	-127	-5.83%	2,177
Sedgwick	66,372	55.23%	52,592	43.76%	792	0.66%	425	0.35%	13,780	11.47%	120,181
Seward	2,520	46.14%	2,910	53.28%	27	0.49%	5	0.09%	-390	-7.14%	5,462
Shawnee	30,626	54.09%	25,736	45.45%	203	0.36%	60	0.11%	4,890	8.64%	56,625
Sheridan	1,028	55.66%	808	43.75%	9	0.49%	2	0.11%	220	11.91%	1,847
Sherman	1,522	50.56%	1,463	48.60%	19	0.63%	6	0.20%	59	1.96%	3,010
Smith	1,809	46.73%	2,026	52.34%	29	0.75%	7	0.18%	-217	-5.61%	3,871
Stafford	2,087	57.32%	1,516	41.64%	38	1.04%	0	0.00%	571	15.68%	3,641
Stanton	500	51.55%	459	47.32%	8	0.82%	3	0.31%	41	4.23%	970
Stevens	1,006	49.80%	992	49.11%	17	0.84%	5	0.25%	14	0.69%	2,020
Sumner	5,574	53.34%	4,760	45.55%	102	0.98%	14	0.13%	814	7.79%	10,450
Thomas	1,793	53.55%	1,528	45.64%	23	0.69%	4	0.12%	265	7.91%	3,348
Trego	1,177	54.44%	974	45.05%	9	0.42%	2	0.09%	203	9.39%	2,162
Wabaunsee	1,287	40.83%	1,839	58.34%	19	0.60%	7	0.22%	-552	-17.51%	3,152
Wallace	496	48.72%	516	50.69%	5	0.49%	1	0.10%	-20	-1.97%	1,018
Washington	2,015	42.83%	2,654	56.41%	32	0.68%	4	0.09%	-639	-13.58%	4,705
Wichita	662	55.30%	529	44.19%	6	0.50%	0	0.00%	133	11.11%	1,197
Wilson	2,592	46.65%	2,919	52.54%	40	0.72%	5	0.09%	-327	-5.89%	5,556
Woodson	1,128	46.40%	1,279	52.61%	17	0.70%	7	0.29%	-151	-6.21%	2,431
Wyandotte	43,442	66.47%	20,553	31.45%	890	1.36%	466	0.71%	22,889	35.02%	65,351
Totals	464,028	54.09%	386,579	45.06%	5,393	0.63%	1,901	0.22%	77,449	9.03%	857,901

==== Counties that flipped from Republican to Democratic ====
- Wichita
- Crawford
- Shawnee
- Lyon
- Sherman
- Sheridan
- Trego
- Ford
- Russell
- Rush
- Barton
- Barber
- Butler
- Pawnee
- Ottawa
- Edwards
- Rice
- Reno
- Harvey
- Sumner
- Saline
- Cloud
- Finney
- Geary
- Nemaha
- Atchison
- Leavenworth
- Osage
- Franklin
- Miami
- Anderson
- Allen
- Cowley
- Neosho
- Labette
- Cherokee
- Pratt
- Douglas
- Lane
- Stafford
- Kingman
- Bourbon
- Clark
- Gove
- Comanche
- Grant
- Gray
- Greeley
- Hamilton
- Haskell
- Hodgeman
- Kearny
- McPherson
- Montgomery
- Morton
- Ness
- Sedgwick
- Stanton
- Stevens
- Thomas

== See also ==
- United States presidential elections in Kansas
