= Hamilton County, Kansas =

County in Kansas, United States

- County
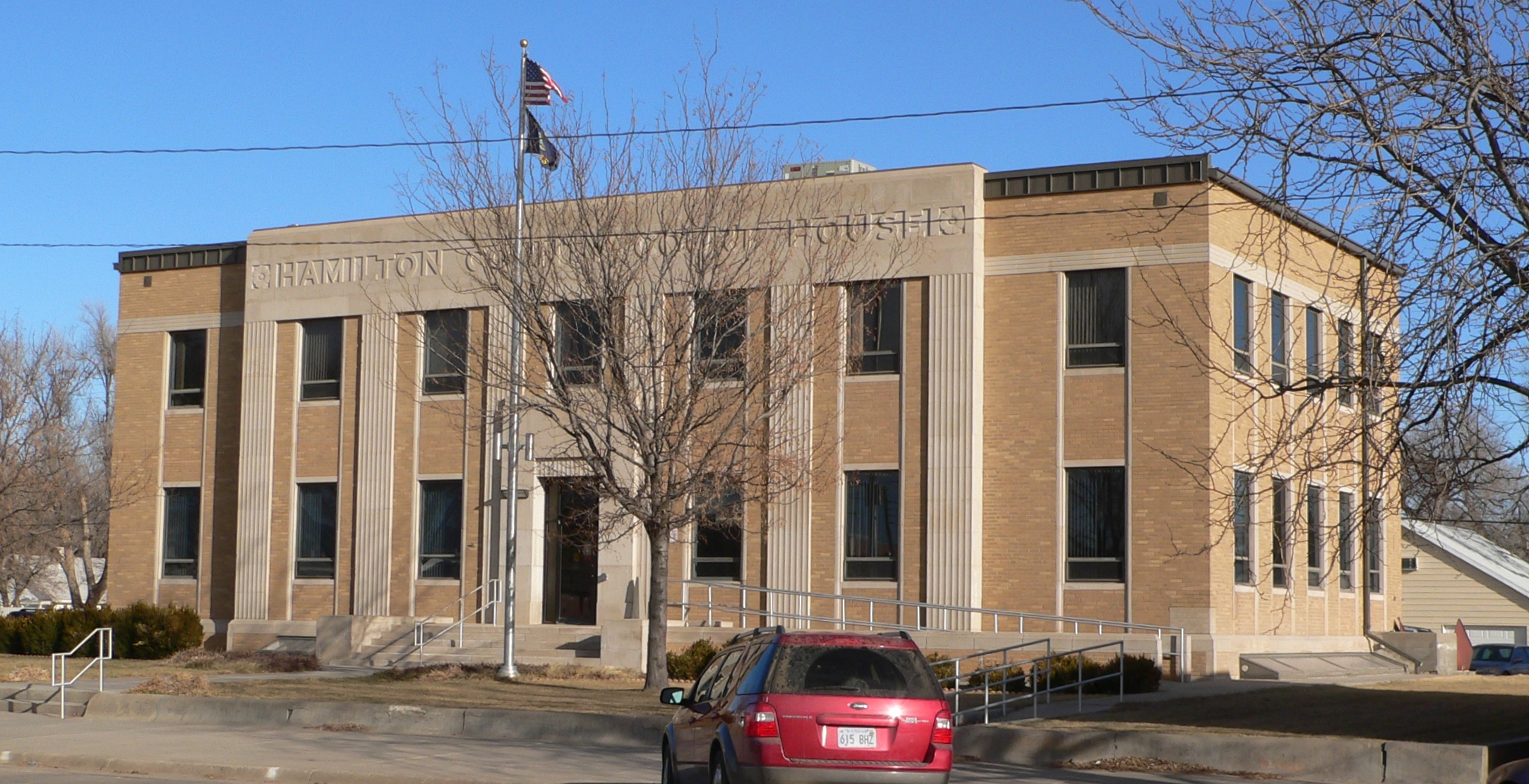
- Hamilton County Courthouse in Syracuse (2010)

- Location within the U.S. state of Kansas
- Coordinates: 38°01′00″N 101°40′01″W
- Country: United States
- State: Kansas
- Founded: March 20, 1873
- Named for: Alexander Hamilton
- Seat: Syracuse
- Largest city: Syracuse

Area
  - Total: 998 sq mi (2,580 km^{2})
  - Land: 997 sq mi (2,580 km^{2})
  - Water: 1.1 sq mi (2.8 km^{2}) 0.1%

Population (2020)
  - Total: 2,518
  - Estimate (2025): 2,500 ▼
  - Density: 2.5/sq mi (0.97/km^{2})
- Time zone: UTC−7 (Mountain)
  - Summer (DST): UTC−6 (MDT)
- Congressional district: 1st
- Website: hamiltoncountyks.org

Hamilton County is a county located in the U.S. state of Kansas. Its county seat and most populous city is Syracuse. As of the 2020 census, the county population was 2,518. The county was founded in 1873 and named for Alexander Hamilton, a founding father of the United States.

== History ==
In 1873, Hamilton County was established and named for Alexander Hamilton, though its boundaries were later expanded in 1883 to include parts of present-day Grant, Kearny, and Stanton counties. In 1887 the original boundaries were restored. Many early American exploring expeditions, including those led by Zebulon Pike in 1806 and Stephen Long in 1820, passed through the county. Fort Aubrey, established in 1865 near what would become Mayline, briefly served as a military post. The first permanent settlement came in 1872 when a colony from Syracuse, New York, selected land in the county, though their attempt to rename the county to Onondaga was unsuccessful.

By early 1886, the county's population had grown enough to seek formal organization. A petition signed by 250 citizens led Governor John A. Martin to authorize a census, which confirmed 1,893 residents. On January 29, 1886, Hamilton County was officially organized, initially encompassing Stanton and parts of Kearny and Grant counties. Kendall was named the temporary county seat, but a battle for the permanent designation ensued between Kendall and Syracuse. Allegations of election fraud led to a Supreme Court ruling invalidating Syracuse's initial victory, but a second vote in November 1886 confirmed Syracuse as the county seat.

The dispute continued for several years, with two rival sets of county officials and divided records until the Kansas Supreme Court finally ruled in favor of Syracuse. The arrival of the Atchison, Topeka & Santa Fe Railroad hastened the county's development, and by 1910, Hamilton County had eight townships, 27 school districts, and high schools in Coolidge and Syracuse.

In the 1930s, the prosperity of the area was severely affected by its location within the Dust Bowl. This catastrophe intensified the economic impact of the Great Depression in the region.

== Geography ==
According to the U.S. Census Bureau, the county has a total area of 998 square miles (2,580 km^{2}), of which 997 square miles (2,580 km^{2}) is land and 1.1 square miles (2.8 km^{2}) (0.1%) is water.

The Arkansas River flows through the county. White magnesian limestone and gypsum deposits are found in the region.

=== Major highways ===
- U.S. Highway 50
- U.S. Highway 400
- K-27

=== Adjacent counties ===
- Greeley County (north)
- Wichita County (northeast/Central Time border)
- Kearny County (east/Central Time border)
- Stanton County (south/Central Time border)
- Prowers County, Colorado (west)

== Demographics ==
Historical population
Census	Pop.	Note	%±
1880	168		—
1890	2,027		1,106.5%
1900	1,426		−29.6%
1910	3,360		135.6%
1920	2,586		−23.0%
1930	3,328		28.7%
1940	2,645		−20.5%
1950	3,696		39.7%
1960	3,144		−14.9%
1970	2,747		−12.6%
1980	2,514		−8.5%
1990	2,388		−5.0%
2000	2,670		11.8%
2010	2,690		0.7%
2020	2,518		−6.4%
2025 (est.)	2,500	▼	−0.7%
U.S. Decennial Census; 1790-1960 1900-1990; 1990-2000 2010-2020

=== 2020 census ===
As of the 2020 census, the county had a population of 2,518. The median age was 34.5 years; 28.8% of residents were under the age of 18 and 14.0% were 65 years of age or older. For every 100 females there were 110.5 males, and for every 100 females age 18 and over there were 111.3 males age 18 and over. 0.0% of residents lived in urban areas, while 100.0% lived in rural areas.

The racial makeup of the county was 63.4% White, 0.5% Black or African American, 1.1% American Indian and Alaska Native, 0.2% Asian, 0.0% Native Hawaiian and Pacific Islander, 21.4% from some other race, and 13.4% from two or more races. Hispanic or Latino residents of any race comprised 43.1% of the population.

There were 933 households in the county, of which 37.4% had children under the age of 18 living with them and 22.6% had a female householder with no spouse or partner present. About 27.2% of all households were made up of individuals and 13.8% had someone living alone who was 65 years of age or older.

There were 1,106 housing units, of which 15.6% were vacant. Among occupied housing units, 69.3% were owner-occupied and 30.7% were renter-occupied. The homeowner vacancy rate was 1.2% and the rental vacancy rate was 13.0%.

=== 2000 census ===
As of the 2000 census, there were 2,670 people, 1,054 households, and 715 families residing in the county. The population density was 3 people per square mile (1.2 people/km^{2}). There were 1,211 housing units at an average density of 1 per square mile (0.39/km^{2}). The racial makeup of the county was 81.65% White, 0.56% Asian, 0.49% Black or African American, 0.49% Native American, 15.13% from other races, and 1.69% from two or more races. Hispanic or Latino of any race were 20.60% of the population.

There were 1,054 households, out of which 33.90% had children under the age of 18 living with them, 56.90% were married couples living together, 7.60% had a female householder with no husband present, and 32.10% were non-families. 29.40% of all households were made up of individuals, and 15.80% had someone living alone who was 65 years of age or older. The average household size was 2.49 and the average family size was 3.09.

In the county, the population was spread out, with 28.40% under the age of 18, 7.20% from 18 to 24, 25.30% from 25 to 44, 20.90% from 45 to 64, and 18.40% who were 65 years of age or older. The median age was 38 years. For every 100 females there were 97.60 males. For every 100 females age 18 and over, there were 92.60 males.

The median income for a household in the county was $32,033, and the median income for a family was $38,550. Males had a median income of $26,701 versus $21,000 for females. The per capita income for the county was $16,484. About 10.90% of families and 15.70% of the population were below the poverty line, including 21.50% of those under age 18 and 9.40% of those age 65 or over.

== Government ==
Hamilton County has, since the 1940s, nearly always been carried by Republican candidates. The last time a Democratic candidate has carried Hamilton County was in 1976 by Jimmy Carter. As with many adjacent counties, Republicans have been increasing their influence in the county's presidential elections, when Donald Trump in 2016 won by a margin of approximately 70%, as Hillary Clinton only managed to get 14% of the county's vote.

=== Presidential elections ===
Presidential election results

United States presidential election results for Hamilton County, Kansas
Year	Republican		Democratic		Third party(ies)	
Year	No.	%	No.	%	No.	%
1888	480	59.11%	295	36.33%	37	4.56%
1892	252	56.25%	0	0.00%	196	43.75%
1896	185	45.57%	216	53.20%	5	1.23%
1900	182	46.31%	194	49.36%	17	4.33%
1904	215	58.58%	126	34.33%	26	7.08%
1908	415	57.32%	275	37.98%	34	4.70%
1912	134	21.30%	263	41.81%	232	36.88%
1916	511	44.05%	522	45.00%	127	10.95%
1920	591	57.66%	371	36.20%	63	6.15%
1924	610	52.27%	307	26.31%	250	21.42%
1928	839	68.43%	363	29.61%	24	1.96%
1932	651	36.68%	1,021	57.52%	103	5.80%
1936	720	44.55%	885	54.76%	11	0.68%
1940	798	57.95%	569	41.32%	10	0.73%
1944	795	62.35%	471	36.94%	9	0.71%
1948	749	50.64%	722	48.82%	8	0.54%
1952	1,209	72.70%	437	26.28%	17	1.02%
1956	865	60.66%	552	38.71%	9	0.63%
1960	885	59.76%	591	39.91%	5	0.34%
1964	685	48.21%	726	51.09%	10	0.70%
1968	751	56.25%	410	30.71%	174	13.03%
1972	941	67.26%	394	28.16%	64	4.57%
1976	560	41.70%	746	55.55%	37	2.76%
1980	889	64.65%	402	29.24%	84	6.11%
1984	1,037	70.64%	408	27.79%	23	1.57%
1988	801	60.00%	517	38.73%	17	1.27%
1992	716	51.96%	386	28.01%	276	20.03%
1996	811	64.93%	342	27.38%	96	7.69%
2000	901	75.59%	264	22.15%	27	2.27%
2004	888	78.58%	229	20.27%	13	1.15%
2008	844	77.01%	233	21.26%	19	1.73%
2012	693	79.02%	163	18.59%	21	2.39%
2016	705	80.48%	121	13.81%	50	5.71%
2020	698	81.26%	141	16.41%	20	2.33%
2024	671	82.33%	131	16.07%	13	1.60%

=== Laws ===
Although the Kansas Constitution was amended in 1986 to allow the sale of alcoholic liquor by the individual drink with the approval of voters, Hamilton County has remained a prohibition, or "dry", county.

== Education ==
=== Unified school districts ===
- Syracuse USD 494

== Communities ==
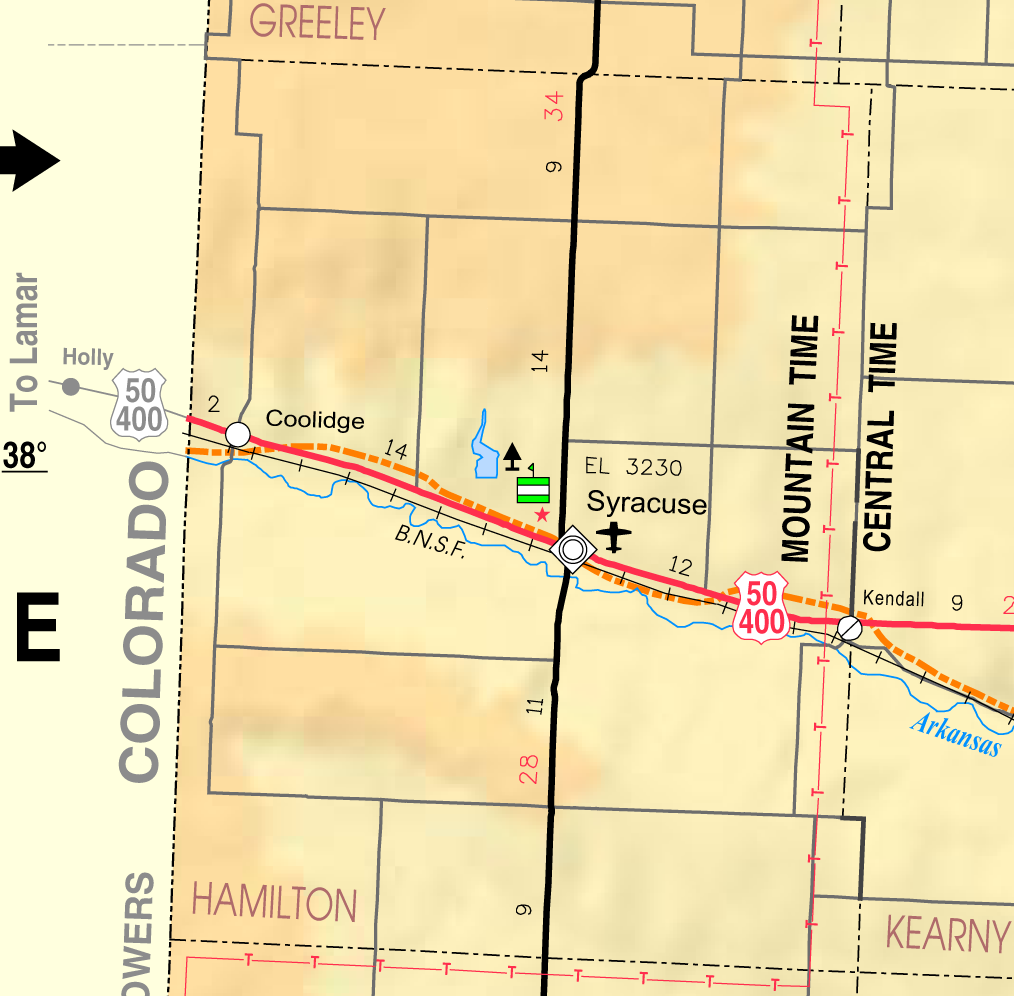
2005 map of Hamilton County (map legend)

List of townships / incorporated cities / unincorporated communities / extinct former communities within Hamilton County.

=== Cities ===
- Coolidge
- Syracuse (county seat)

=== Unincorporated community ===
- Kendall

=== Townships ===
Area affected by 1930s Dust Bowl

Hamilton County is divided into eight townships. None of the cities within the county are considered governmentally independent, and all figures for the townships include those of the cities. In the following table, the population center is the largest city (or cities) included in that township's population total, if it is of a significant size.

Township	FIPS	Population center	Population	Population density /km^{2} (/sq mi)	Land area km^{2} (sq mi)	Water area km^{2} (sq mi)	Water %	Geographic coordinates
Bear Creek	04850		69	0 (0)	452 (174)	1 (0)	0.19%	37°49′19″N 101°56′36″W
Coolidge	15425		128	0 (1)	297 (115)	1 (0)	0.37%	38°2′22″N 101°59′41″W
Kendall	36425		101	0 (1)	234 (90)	0 (0)	0%	37°59′41″N 101°35′3″W
Lamont	38275		89	0 (1)	426 (164)	0 (0)	0.02%	37°48′9″N 101°38′41″W
Liberty	40075		38	0 (0)	257 (99)	0 (0)	0.03%	38°7′29″N 101°44′4″W
Medway	45650		53	0 (0)	279 (108)	1 (0)	0.28%	38°4′51″N 101°51′13″W
Richland	59325		27	0 (0)	426 (164)	0 (0)	0%	38°13′21″N 101°46′17″W
Syracuse	69875		2,165	10 (27)	210 (81)	0 (0)	0.01%	37°59′10″N 101°45′5″W
Sources: "Census 2000 U.S. Gazetteer Files". U.S. Census Bureau, Geography Division. Archived from the original on August 2, 2002.

== Gallery ==
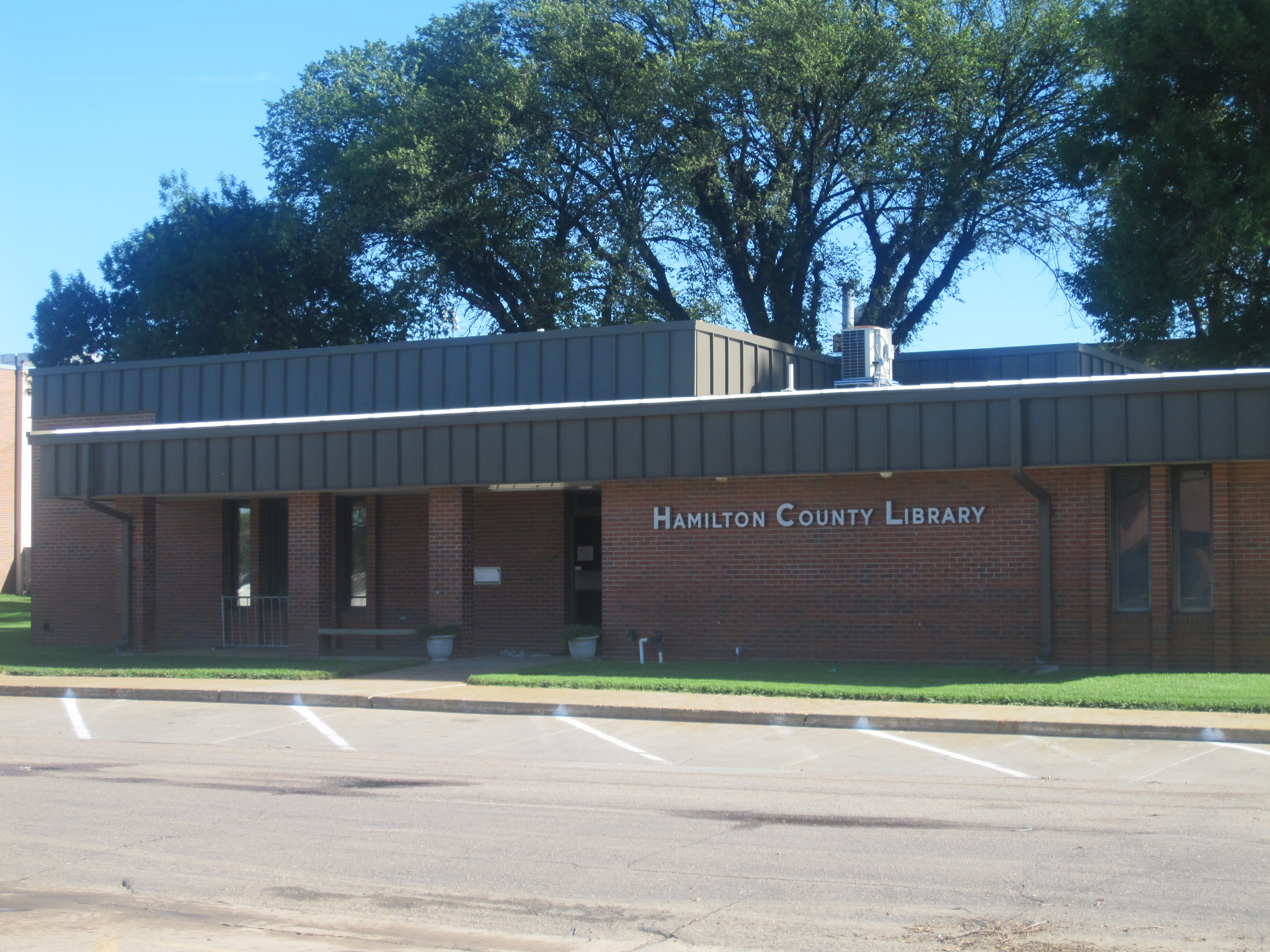
Hamilton County Public Library in Syracuse

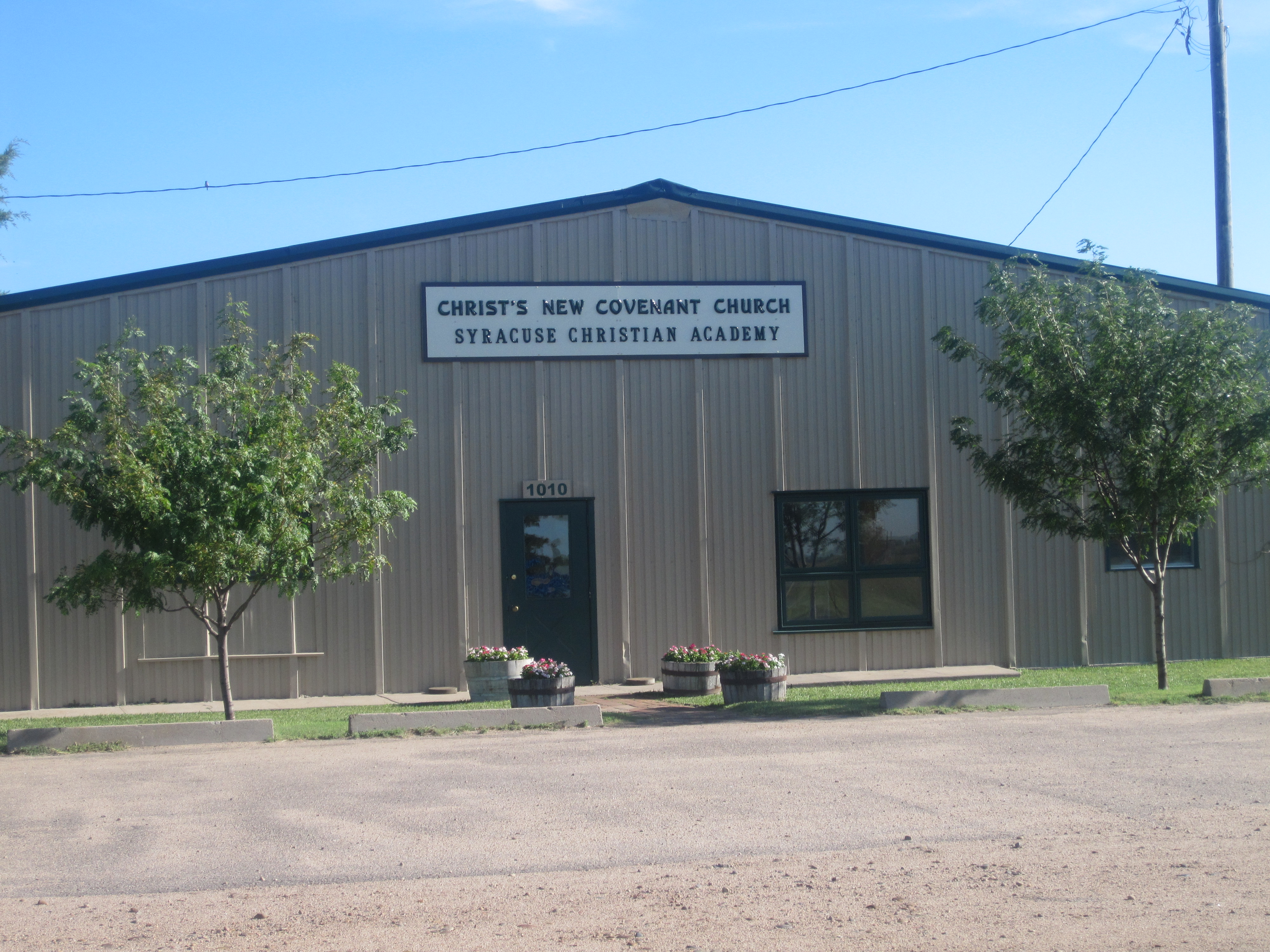
Christ's New Covenant Church and Syracuse Christian Academy in Syracuse

== See also ==
Community information for Kansas

- Kansas locations by per capita income
- List of counties in Kansas
- List of townships in Kansas
- List of cities in Kansas
- List of unincorporated communities in Kansas
- List of ghost towns in Kansas
