= Lakin Township, Kearny County, Kansas =

Lakin Township
- Township
- Location in Kearny County
- Coordinates: 38°00′09″N 101°16′04″W
- Country: United States
- State: Kansas
- County: Kearny

Area
  - Total: 63.26 sq mi (163.85 km^{2})
  - Land: 63.24 sq mi (163.79 km^{2})
  - Water: 0.023 sq mi (0.06 km^{2}) 0.04%
- Elevation: 3,186 ft (971 m)

Population (2020)
  - Total: 2,491
  - Density: 39.39/sq mi (15.21/km^{2})
- GNIS feature ID: 0485281

Lakin Township is a township in Kearny County, Kansas, United States. As of the 2020 census, its population was 2,491.

== Geography ==
Lakin Township covers an area of 63.26 square miles (163.85 square kilometers); of this, 0.02 square miles (0.06 square kilometers) or 0.04 percent is water. The stream of Sand Creek runs through this township.

=== Communities ===
- Lakin (the county seat)

=== Adjacent townships ===
- East Hibbard Township (north)
- Deerfield Township (east)
- Southside Township (southeast)
- Kendall Township (southwest)
- Hartland Township (west)
- West Hibbard Township (northwest)

=== Cemeterys ===
The township contains one cemetery, Lakin.

=== Major highways ===
- U.S. Route 50
- K-25

=== Airports and landing strips ===
- Lakin Landing Field
