= 2000 United States presidential election in Kansas =

- November 7, 2000

Nominee	George W. Bush	Al Gore
Party	Republican	Democratic
Home state	Texas	Tennessee
Running mate	Dick Cheney	Joe Lieberman
Electoral vote	6	0
Popular vote	622,332	399,276
Percentage	58.04%	37.24%

Bush
40–50%
50–60%
60–70%
70–80%
80–90%
Gore
40–50%
60–70%
President before election
Bill Clinton
Democratic
Elected President
George W. Bush
Republican

The 2000 United States presidential election in Kansas took place on November 7, 2000, and was part of the 2000 United States presidential election. Voters chose six representatives, or electors to the Electoral College, who voted for president and vice president.

Kansas was won by Governor George W. Bush. He won all of the congressional districts and counties in the state, except for Douglas County and Wyandotte County. Gore won Douglas, home to Lawrence and the University of Kansas, with just 45.8 percent of the vote, thereby making Bush the first ever Republican to win the White House without carrying this county. Independent Ralph Nader also achieved his best performance by far in Douglas, where he got over ten percent of the vote. Bush performed very well in the first district, which is the western and most rural part of the state.

== General election ==
=== Polling ===
Poll source	Date(s)	Sample size	Margin of error	George W. Bush (R)	Al Gore (D)	Ralph Nader (G)	Other / undecided (Note: Calculated by taking the difference of 100% and all other candidates combined.)
Harris Insights & Analytics	November 3, 2000	2,543	—	55%	38%	4%	3%

=== Results ===
2000 United States presidential election in Kansas
Party	Candidate	Votes	Percentage	Electoral votes
Republican	George W. Bush	622,332	58.04%	6
Democratic	Al Gore	399,276	37.24%	0
Independent	Ralph Nader	36,086	3.37%	0
Reform	Patrick Buchanan	7,370	0.69%	0
Libertarian	Harry Browne	4,525	0.42%	0
Independent	John Hagelin	1,373	0.13%	0
Independent	Howard Phillips	1,254	0.12%	0
Totals		1,072,216	100.00%	6
Voter turnout (Voting age/registered)				54%/66%

==== Results by county ====
County	George W. Bush Republican		Al Gore Democratic		Various candidates Other parties		Margin		Total votes cast
County	#	%	#	%	#	%	#	%	Total votes cast
Allen	3,379	58.60%	2,132	36.98%	255	4.42%	1,247	21.62%	5,766
Anderson	1,984	57.04%	1,327	38.15%	167	4.80%	657	18.89%	3,478
Atchison	3,378	48.96%	3,171	45.96%	351	5.09%	207	3.00%	6,900
Barber	1,755	70.26%	637	25.50%	106	4.24%	1,118	44.76%	2,498
Barton	7,302	66.65%	3,238	29.56%	415	3.79%	4,064	37.09%	10,955
Bourbon	3,852	61.07%	2,211	35.05%	245	3.88%	1,641	26.02%	6,308
Brown	2,985	63.63%	1,512	32.23%	194	4.14%	1,473	31.40%	4,691
Butler	13,377	63.69%	6,755	32.16%	870	4.14%	6,622	31.53%	21,002
Chase	848	64.39%	391	29.69%	78	5.92%	1,247	34.70%	1,317
Chautauqua	1,347	71.65%	443	23.56%	90	4.79%	904	48.09%	1,880
Cherokee	5,014	54.92%	3,783	41.43%	333	3.65%	1,231	13.49%	9,130
Cheyenne	1,312	75.97%	350	20.27%	65	3.76%	962	55.70%	1,727
Clark	926	73.43%	292	23.16%	43	3.41%	634	50.27%	1,261
Clay	2,998	73.34%	951	23.26%	139	3.40%	2,047	50.08%	4,088
Cloud	2,918	64.80%	1,314	29.18%	271	6.02%	1,604	35.62%	4,503
Coffey	2,700	66.83%	1,196	29.60%	144	3.56%	1,504	37.23%	4,040
Comanche	760	75.55%	211	20.97%	35	3.48%	549	54.58%	1,006
Cowley	8,080	56.86%	5,535	38.95%	595	4.19%	2,545	17.91%	14,210
Crawford	7,160	47.63%	7,076	47.07%	798	5.31%	84	0.56%	15,034
Decatur	1,255	71.35%	424	24.10%	80	4.55%	831	47.25%	1,759
Dickinson	5,243	64.79%	2,413	29.82%	436	5.39%	2,830	34.97%	8,092
Doniphan	2,350	64.40%	1,134	31.08%	165	4.52%	1,216	33.32%	3,649
Douglas	17,062	42.83%	18,249	45.81%	4,527	11.36%	-1,187	-2.98%	39,838
Edwards	1,062	67.95%	447	28.60%	54	3.45%	615	39.35%	1,563
Elk	1,080	69.68%	402	25.94%	68	4.39%	678	43.74%	1,550
Ellis	6,516	58.39%	3,926	35.18%	718	6.43%	2,590	23.21%	11,160
Ellsworth	1,845	64.99%	825	29.06%	169	5.95%	1,020	35.93%	2,839
Finney	6,442	70.40%	2,431	26.57%	277	3.03%	4,011	43.83%	9,150
Ford	6,050	67.85%	2,566	28.78%	301	3.38%	3,484	39.07%	8,917
Franklin	5,925	61.35%	3,321	34.39%	412	4.27%	2,604	26.96%	9,658
Geary	3,977	57.92%	2,660	38.74%	229	3.34%	1,317	19.18%	6,866
Gove	1,122	75.05%	296	19.80%	77	5.15%	826	55.25%	1,495
Graham	1,058	71.78%	346	23.47%	70	4.75%	712	48.31%	1,474
Grant	2,126	74.44%	683	23.91%	47	1.65%	1,443	50.53%	2,856
Gray	1,631	75.51%	482	22.31%	47	2.18%	1,149	53.20%	2,160
Greeley	628	78.21%	143	17.81%	32	3.99%	485	60.40%	803
Greenwood	2,392	67.17%	1,027	28.84%	142	3.99%	1,365	38.33%	3,561
Hamilton	901	75.59%	264	22.15%	27	2.27%	637	53.44%	1,192
Harper	2,076	67.95%	869	28.45%	110	3.60%	1,207	39.50%	3,055
Harvey	8,271	60.44%	4,591	33.55%	822	6.01%	3,680	26.89%	13,684
Haskell	1,323	81.87%	263	16.27%	30	1.86%	1,060	65.60%	1,616
Hodgeman	835	76.75%	217	19.94%	36	3.31%	618	56.81%	1,088
Jackson	3,001	57.16%	1,990	37.90%	259	4.93%	1,011	19.26%	5,250
Jefferson	4,423	56.15%	3,000	38.09%	454	5.76%	1,423	18.06%	7,877
Jewell	1,400	74.59%	380	20.25%	97	5.17%	1,020	54.34%	1,877
Johnson	129,965	59.74%	79,118	36.37%	8,453	3.89%	50,847	23.37%	217,536
Kearny	1,084	75.54%	320	22.30%	31	2.16%	764	53.24%	1,435
Kingman	2,672	70.17%	991	26.02%	145	3.81%	1,681	44.15%	3,808
Kiowa	1,262	78.48%	294	18.28%	52	3.23%	968	60.20%	1,608
Labette	4,475	52.41%	3,745	43.86%	318	3.72%	730	8.55%	8,538
Lane	846	74.67%	252	22.24%	35	3.09%	594	52.43%	1,133
Leavenworth	12,583	54.07%	9,733	41.82%	955	4.10%	2,850	12.25%	23,271
Lincoln	1,295	68.52%	469	24.81%	126	6.67%	826	43.71%	1,890
Linn	2,513	59.00%	1,587	37.26%	159	3.73%	926	21.74%	4,259
Logan	1,088	77.88%	231	16.54%	78	5.58%	857	61.34%	1,397
Lyon	6,652	53.41%	5,190	41.67%	613	4.92%	1,462	11.74%	12,455
Marion	4,156	70.40%	1,475	24.99%	272	4.61%	2,681	45.41%	5,903
Marshall	3,066	59.94%	1,831	35.80%	218	4.26%	1,235	24.14%	5,115
McPherson	8,501	68.22%	3,272	26.26%	688	5.52%	5,229	41.96%	12,461
Meade	1,604	78.13%	400	19.48%	49	2.39%	1,204	58.65%	2,053
Miami	6,611	56.96%	4,554	39.23%	442	3.81%	2,057	17.73%	11,607
Mitchell	2,350	71.95%	751	22.99%	165	5.05%	1,599	48.96%	3,266
Montgomery	8,496	61.81%	4,770	34.70%	479	3.48%	3,726	27.11%	13,745
Morris	1,599	60.55%	882	33.40%	160	6.06%	717	27.15%	2,641
Morton	1,203	77.26%	321	20.62%	33	2.12%	882	56.64%	1,557
Nemaha	3,578	67.64%	1,494	28.24%	218	4.12%	2,084	39.40%	5,290
Neosho	4,014	58.29%	2,588	37.58%	284	4.12%	1,426	20.71%	6,886
Ness	1,420	75.69%	383	20.42%	73	3.89%	1,037	55.27%	1,876
Norton	1,744	71.15%	598	24.40%	109	4.45%	1,146	46.75%	2,451
Osage	3,770	57.01%	2,530	38.26%	313	4.73%	1,240	18.75%	6,613
Osborne	1,432	70.54%	484	23.84%	114	5.62%	948	46.70%	2,030
Ottawa	1,977	70.83%	631	22.61%	183	6.56%	1,346	48.22%	2,791
Pawnee	1,850	62.93%	968	32.93%	122	4.15%	882	30.00%	2,940
Phillips	2,057	73.67%	611	21.88%	124	4.44%	1,446	51.79%	2,792
Pottawatomie	4,985	64.48%	2,037	26.35%	709	9.17%	2,948	38.13%	7,731
Pratt	2,885	65.33%	1,314	29.76%	217	4.91%	1,571	35.57%	4,416
Rawlins	1,349	77.53%	306	17.59%	85	4.89%	1,043	59.94%	1,740
Reno	15,179	59.69%	9,025	35.49%	1,226	4.82%	6,154	24.20%	25,430
Republic	2,239	75.01%	604	20.23%	142	4.76%	1,635	54.78%	2,985
Rice	2,903	64.23%	1,422	31.46%	195	4.31%	1,481	32.77%	4,520
Riley	10,672	58.47%	6,188	33.90%	1,393	7.63%	4,484	24.57%	18,253
Rooks	2,016	72.65%	597	21.51%	162	5.84%	1,419	51.14%	2,775
Rush	1,235	66.61%	505	27.24%	114	6.15%	730	39.37%	1,854
Russell	2,434	69.90%	886	25.45%	162	4.65%	1,548	44.45%	3,482
Saline	12,412	57.66%	7,487	34.78%	1,628	7.56%	4,925	22.88%	21,527
Scott	1,811	78.64%	418	18.15%	74	3.21%	1,393	60.49%	2,303
Sedgwick	93,724	57.35%	62,561	38.28%	7,132	4.36%	31,163	19.07%	163,417
Seward	3,869	75.92%	1,126	22.10%	101	1.98%	2,743	53.82%	5,096
Shawnee	35,894	48.26%	34,818	46.82%	3,661	4.92%	1,076	1.44%	74,373
Sheridan	1,132	76.02%	281	18.87%	76	5.10%	851	57.15%	1,489
Sherman	1,894	70.62%	681	25.39%	107	3.99%	1,213	45.23%	2,682
Smith	1,534	70.24%	534	24.45%	116	5.31%	1,000	45.79%	2,184
Stafford	1,546	70.27%	567	25.77%	87	3.95%	979	44.50%	2,200
Stanton	785	76.29%	215	20.89%	29	2.82%	570	55.40%	1,029
Stevens	1,714	81.19%	345	16.34%	52	2.46%	1,369	64.85%	2,111
Sumner	6,176	60.36%	3,549	34.69%	507	4.96%	2,627	25.67%	10,232
Thomas	2,822	74.66%	807	21.35%	151	3.99%	2,015	53.31%	3,780
Trego	1,220	66.41%	516	28.09%	101	5.50%	704	38.32%	1,837
Wabaunsee	2,182	63.80%	1,025	29.97%	213	6.23%	1,157	33.83%	3,420
Wallace	737	85.60%	103	11.96%	21	2.44%	634	73.64%	861
Washington	2,446	74.87%	687	21.03%	134	4.10%	1,759	53.84%	3,267
Wichita	859	78.81%	207	18.99%	24	2.20%	652	59.82%	1,090
Wilson	2,748	67.11%	1,186	28.96%	161	3.93%	1,562	38.15%	4,095
Woodson	974	61.07%	521	32.66%	100	6.27%	453	28.41%	1,595
Wyandotte	14,024	29.05%	32,411	67.14%	1,837	3.81%	-18,387	-38.09%	48,272
Totals	622,332	58.04%	399,276	37.24%	50,608	4.72%	223,056	20.80%	1,072,216

==== Counties that flipped from Democratic to Republica ====
- Atchison (Largest city: Atchison)
- Crawford (Largest city: Pittsburg)

==== By congressional district ====
Bush won all four congressional districts, including one that elected a Democrat.

District	Bush	Gore	Representative
1st	67%	28%	Jerry Moran
2nd	55%	40%	Jim Ryun
3rd	53%	42%	Dennis Moore
4th	59%	37%	Todd Tiahrt

== Electors ==
Technically the voters of Kansas cast their ballots for electors: representatives to the Electoral College. Kansas is allocated 6 electors because it has 4 congressional districts and 2 senators. All candidates who appear on the ballot or qualify to receive write-in votes must submit a list of 6 electors, who pledge to vote for their candidate and their running mate. Whoever wins the majority of votes in the state is awarded all 6 electoral votes. Their chosen electors then vote for president and vice president. Although electors are pledged to their candidate and running mate, they are not obligated to vote for them. An elector who votes for someone other than their candidate is known as a faithless elector.

The electors of each state and the District of Columbia met on December 18, 2000 to cast their votes for president and vice president. The Electoral College itself never meets as one body. Instead the electors from each state and the District of Columbia met in their respective capitols.

The following were the members of the Electoral College from the state. All were pledged to and voted for George W. Bush and Dick Cheney:

1. Shari Caywood
2. Gene Eastin
3. Richard Eckert
4. Susan Estes
5. Mark Heitz
6. Charles Hostetler

== See also ==
- United States presidential elections in Kansas
- Presidency of George W. Bush
