= 1892 United States presidential election in Kansas =

- November 8, 1892
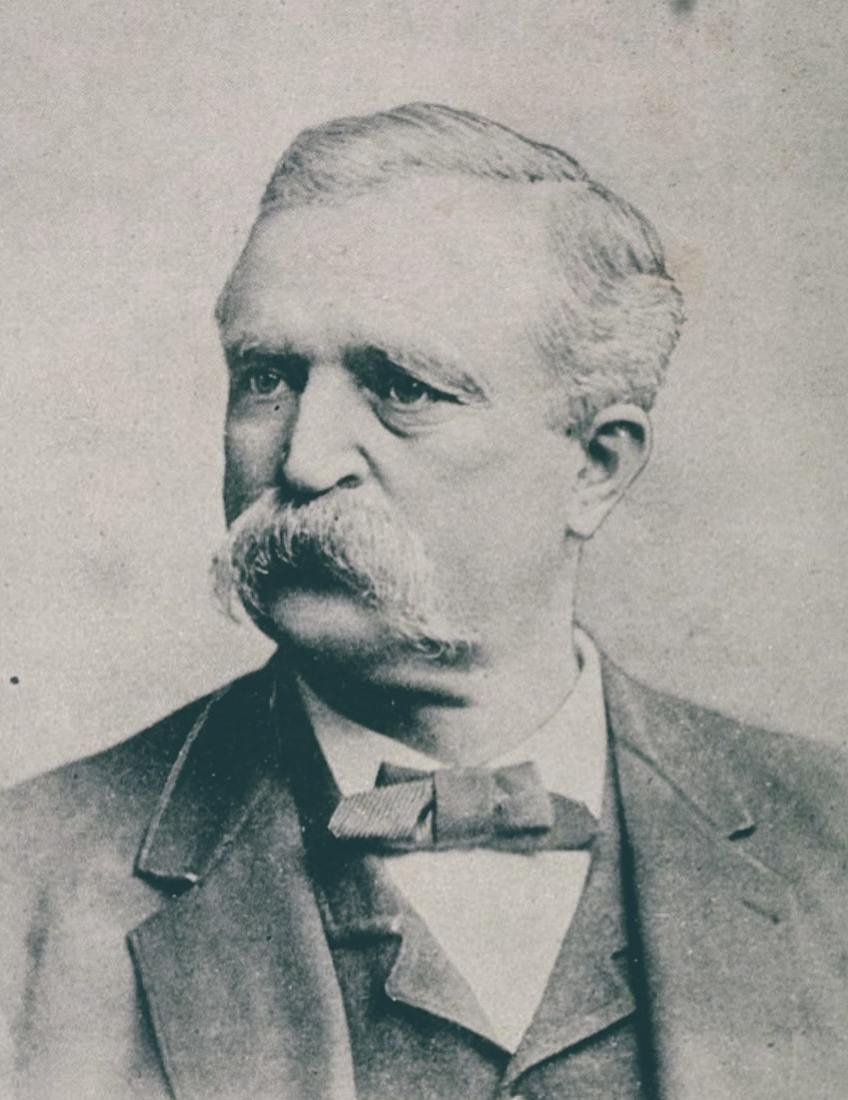

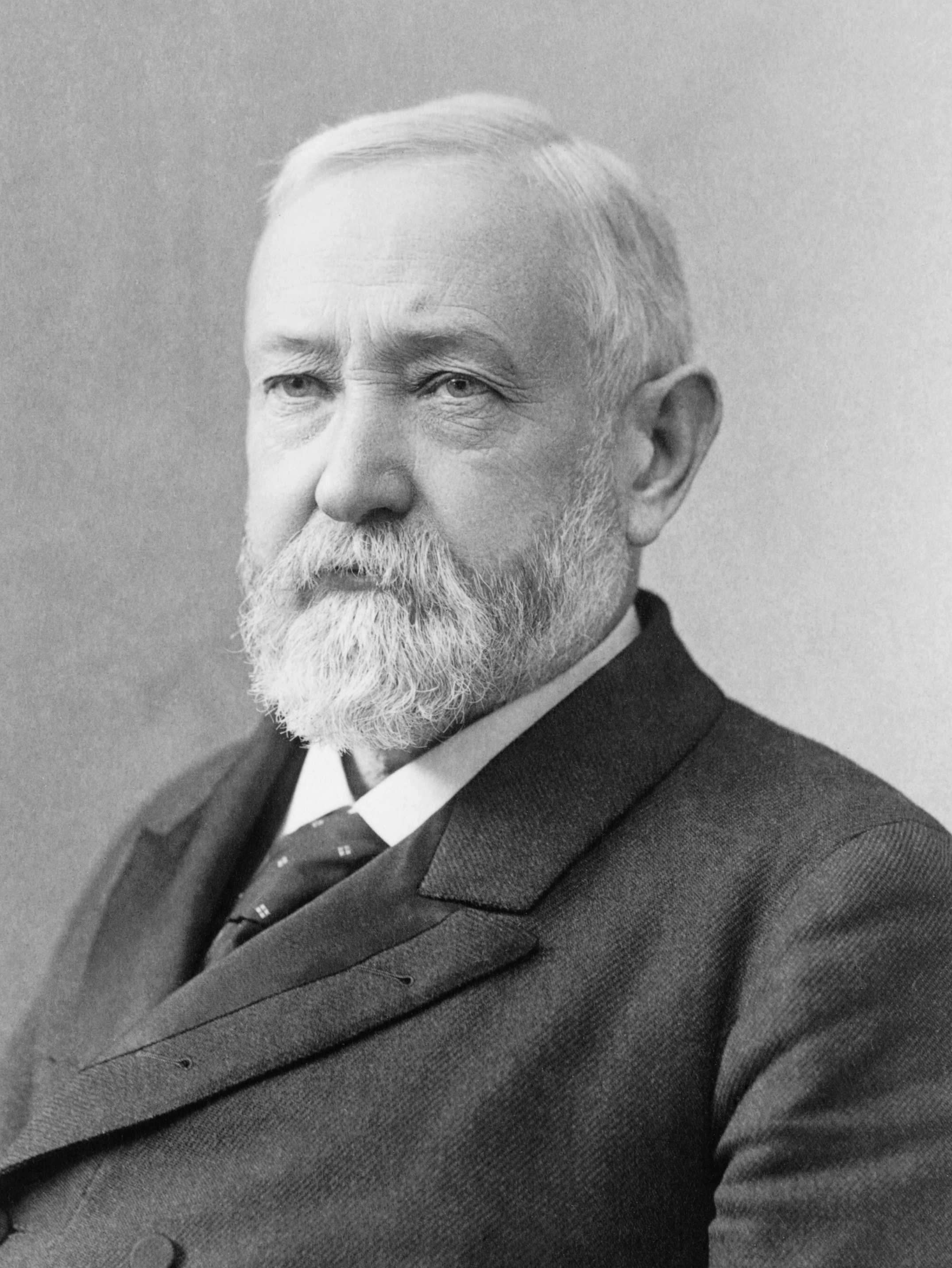
Nominee	James B. Weaver	Benjamin Harrison
Party	Populist	Republican
Alliance	Democratic
Home state	Iowa	Indiana
Running mate	James G. Field	Whitelaw Reid
Electoral vote	10	0
Popular vote	163,111	157,241
Percentage	50.20%	48.40%
County results
Weaver
40–50%
50–60%
60–70%
Harrison
40–50%
50–60%
60–70%
President before election
Benjamin Harrison
Republican
Elected President
Grover Cleveland
Democratic

The 1892 United States presidential election in Kansas took place on November 8, 1892. All contemporary 44 states were part of the 1892 United States presidential election. Kansas voters chose ten electors to the Electoral College, which selected the president and vice president.

Kansas was won by the Populist nominees, James B. Weaver of Iowa and his running mate James G. Field of Virginia. Weaver and Field defeated the Republican nominees, incumbent President Benjamin Harrison of Indiana and his running mate Whitelaw Reid of New York. This was the first time that a non-Republican had won Kansas’ electoral votes since statehood, and one of only seven times out of forty that Kansas has not voted Republican in a presidential election.

The Kansas Democratic Party made an agreement with the Populists in which the Democrats would run candidates for some state and federal offices while leaving the rest, including presidential electors, to the Populists.

Kansas was one of a handful of states, five in total, that did not feature former and future President Grover Cleveland on their ballots: Kansas had been his second weakest state in 1888, garnering only 31.03 percent of the vote. Kansas was also Weaver's fourth strongest state percentage-wise and the state which gave him the most popular votes. Lorenzo D. Lewelling, a fellow Populist, was elected Governor of Kansas, almost perfectly matching Weaver's vote total.

== Results ==
1892 United States presidential election in Kansas
Party	Candidate	Votes	Percentage	Electoral votes
People's / Democratic	James B. Weaver	163,111	50.20%	10
Republican	Benjamin Harrison (incumbent)	157,241	48.40%	0
Prohibition	John Bidwell	4,553	1.40%	0
Totals		324,905	100.00%	10
Voter turnout				—

=== Results by county ===
1892 United States presidential election in Kansas by county
County	Benjamin Harrison Republican		James Baird Weaver Populist		John Bidwell Prohibition		Margin (Note: Because Grover Cleveland was not on the ballot and no nominee was listed under the “Democratic” line, margin given is Harrison vote minus Weaver vote and percentage margin Harrison percentage minus Weaver percentage for all counties.)		Total votes cast
County	#	%	#	%	#	%	#	%	Total votes cast
Allen	1,509	51.20%	1,398	47.44%	40	1.36%	111	3.76%	2,947
Anderson	1,638	51.06%	1,476	46.01%	94	2.93%	162	5.05%	3,208
Atchison	2,666	49.17%	2,718	50.13%	38	0.70%	-52	-0.96%	5,422
Barber	883	37.75%	1,439	61.52%	17	0.73%	-556	-23.77%	2,339
Barton	1,381	43.10%	1,816	56.68%	7	0.22%	-435	-13.58%	3,204
Bourbon	2,803	49.24%	2,863	50.30%	26	0.46%	-60	-1.06%	5,692
Brown	2,562	52.03%	2,252	45.74%	110	2.23%	310	6.29%	4,924
Butler	2,650	48.62%	2,705	49.63%	95	1.74%	-55	-1.01%	5,450
Chase	891	47.37%	972	51.67%	18	0.96%	-81	-4.30%	1,881
Chautauqua	1,408	52.03%	1,292	47.75%	6	0.22%	116	4.28%	2,706
Cherokee	2,696	41.43%	3,751	57.64%	61	0.94%	-1,055	-16.21%	6,508
Cheyenne	505	50.45%	486	48.55%	10	1.00%	19	1.90%	1,001
Clark	226	42.40%	305	57.22%	2	0.38%	-79	-14.82%	533
Clay	1,666	43.78%	2,038	53.56%	101	2.65%	-372	-9.78%	3,805
Cloud	1,915	44.98%	2,268	53.28%	74	1.74%	-353	-8.30%	4,257
Coffey	1,769	47.54%	1,886	50.69%	66	1.77%	-117	-3.15%	3,721
Comanche	259	45.52%	310	54.48%	0	0.00%	-51	-8.96%	569
Cowley	3,886	49.13%	3,896	49.26%	127	1.61%	-10	-0.13%	7,909
Crawford	3,064	41.89%	4,164	56.93%	86	1.18%	-1,100	-15.04%	7,314
Decatur	619	38.59%	983	61.28%	2	0.12%	-364	-22.69%	1,604
Dickinson	2,419	47.14%	2,647	51.59%	65	1.27%	-228	-4.45%	5,131
Doniphan	2,161	64.41%	1,185	35.32%	9	0.27%	976	29.09%	3,355
Douglas	3,114	57.31%	2,174	40.01%	146	2.69%	940	17.30%	5,434
Edwards	399	45.55%	472	53.88%	5	0.57%	-73	-8.33%	876
Elk	1,235	47.19%	1,369	52.31%	13	0.50%	-134	-5.12%	2,617
Ellis	546	33.52%	1,069	65.62%	14	0.86%	-523	-32.10%	1,629
Ellsworth	1,102	49.80%	1,097	49.57%	14	0.63%	5	0.23%	2,213
Finney	478	58.29%	338	41.22%	4	0.49%	140	17.07%	820
Ford	648	53.42%	565	46.58%	0	0.00%	83	6.84%	1,213
Franklin	2,209	46.06%	2,431	50.69%	156	3.25%	-222	-4.63%	4,796
Garfield	102	59.65%	69	40.35%	0	0.00%	33	19.30%	171
Geary	863	42.72%	1,113	55.10%	44	2.18%	-250	-12.38%	2,020
Gove	327	56.87%	248	43.13%	0	0.00%	79	13.74%	575
Graham	436	44.40%	546	55.60%	0	0.00%	-110	-11.20%	982
Grant	151	53.55%	131	46.45%	0	0.00%	20	7.10%	282
Gray	274	54.37%	229	45.44%	1	0.20%	45	8.93%	504
Greeley	241	67.89%	114	32.11%	0	0.00%	127	35.78%	355
Greenwood	1,734	49.01%	1,781	50.34%	23	0.65%	-47	-1.33%	3,538
Hamilton	252	56.25%	186	41.52%	10	2.23%	66	14.73%	448
Harper	1,288	38.57%	1,986	59.48%	65	1.95%	-698	-20.91%	3,339
Harvey	2,025	52.80%	1,756	45.79%	54	1.41%	269	7.01%	3,835
Haskell	177	61.46%	111	38.54%	0	0.00%	66	22.92%	288
Hodgeman	363	61.21%	223	37.61%	7	1.18%	140	23.60%	593
Jackson	1,825	52.93%	1,594	46.23%	29	0.84%	231	6.70%	3,448
Jefferson	2,026	49.95%	1,973	48.64%	57	1.41%	53	1.31%	4,056
Jewell	1,963	45.59%	2,225	51.67%	118	2.74%	-262	-6.08%	4,306
Johnson	2,070	50.48%	1,932	47.11%	99	2.41%	138	3.37%	4,101
Kearny	219	60.83%	141	39.17%	0	0.00%	78	21.66%	360
Kingman	1,225	43.12%	1,564	55.05%	52	1.83%	-339	-11.93%	2,841
Kiowa	398	50.44%	376	47.66%	15	1.90%	22	2.78%	789
Labette	2,950	47.89%	3,116	50.58%	94	1.53%	-166	-2.69%	6,160
Lane	284	55.58%	222	43.44%	5	0.98%	62	12.14%	511
Leavenworth	3,471	46.96%	3,869	52.34%	52	0.70%	-398	-5.38%	7,392
Lincoln	878	39.18%	1,348	60.15%	15	0.67%	-470	-20.97%	2,241
Linn	2,046	49.37%	2,063	49.78%	35	0.84%	-17	-0.41%	4,144
Logan	457	58.14%	329	41.86%	0	0.00%	128	16.28%	786
Lyon	2,591	48.48%	2,623	49.08%	130	2.43%	-32	-0.60%	5,344
Marion	2,210	55.54%	1,682	42.27%	87	2.19%	528	13.27%	3,979
Marshall	2,531	45.32%	2,937	52.59%	117	2.09%	-406	-7.27%	5,585
McPherson	2,294	48.42%	2,335	49.28%	109	2.30%	-41	-0.86%	4,738
Meade	261	54.83%	214	44.96%	1	0.21%	47	9.87%	476
Miami	2,243	49.10%	2,280	49.91%	45	0.99%	-37	-0.81%	4,568
Mitchell	1,467	43.51%	1,855	55.01%	50	1.48%	-388	-11.50%	3,372
Montgomery	2,736	51.83%	2,514	47.62%	29	0.55%	222	4.21%	5,279
Morris	1,416	50.90%	1,323	47.56%	43	1.55%	93	3.34%	2,782
Morton	106	57.61%	76	41.30%	2	1.09%	30	16.31%	184
Nemaha	2,222	49.73%	2,194	49.10%	52	1.16%	28	0.63%	4,468
Neosho	2,000	47.81%	2,170	51.88%	13	0.31%	-170	-4.07%	4,183
Ness	495	44.43%	590	52.96%	29	2.60%	-95	-8.53%	1,114
Norton	1,054	48.26%	1,090	49.91%	40	1.83%	-36	-1.65%	2,184
Osage	2,604	43.77%	3,170	53.29%	175	2.94%	-566	-9.52%	5,949
Osborne	1,162	45.37%	1,380	53.89%	19	0.74%	-218	-8.52%	2,561
Ottawa	1,444	47.48%	1,541	50.67%	56	1.84%	-97	-3.19%	3,041
Pawnee	670	47.86%	722	51.57%	8	0.57%	-52	-3.71%	1,400
Phillips	1,352	47.79%	1,469	51.93%	8	0.28%	-117	-4.14%	2,829
Pottawatomie	2,107	49.80%	2,101	49.66%	23	0.54%	6	0.14%	4,231
Pratt	947	44.19%	1,170	54.60%	26	1.21%	-223	-10.41%	2,143
Rawlins	592	43.79%	756	55.92%	4	0.30%	-164	-12.13%	1,352
Reno	3,166	50.00%	3,097	48.91%	69	1.09%	69	1.09%	6,332
Republic	2,167	50.03%	2,049	47.31%	115	2.66%	118	2.72%	4,331
Rice	1,724	46.78%	1,821	49.42%	140	3.80%	-97	-2.64%	3,685
Riley	1,574	51.67%	1,427	46.85%	45	1.48%	147	4.82%	3,046
Rooks	811	47.93%	847	50.06%	34	2.01%	-36	-2.13%	1,692
Rush	570	47.50%	616	51.33%	14	1.17%	-46	-3.83%	1,200
Russell	1,007	57.44%	730	41.64%	16	0.91%	277	15.80%	1,753
Saline	1,817	45.17%	2,175	54.06%	31	0.77%	-358	-8.89%	4,023
Scott	142	45.95%	162	52.43%	5	1.62%	-20	-6.48%	309
Sedgwick	4,770	46.68%	5,254	51.42%	194	1.90%	-484	-4.74%	10,218
Seward	156	57.14%	115	42.12%	2	0.73%	41	15.02%	273
Shawnee	6,759	60.82%	4,206	37.85%	148	1.33%	2,553	22.97%	11,113
Sheridan	325	41.09%	463	58.53%	3	0.38%	-138	-17.44%	791
Sherman	571	43.16%	748	56.54%	4	0.30%	-177	-13.38%	1,323
Smith	1,389	41.33%	1,923	57.22%	49	1.46%	-534	-15.89%	3,361
Stafford	840	39.25%	1,232	57.57%	68	3.18%	-392	-18.32%	2,140
Stanton	146	52.71%	131	47.29%	0	0.00%	15	5.42%	277
Stevens	85	31.48%	185	68.52%	0	0.00%	-100	-37.04%	270
Sumner	3,503	45.52%	4,058	52.74%	134	1.74%	-555	-7.22%	7,695
Thomas	490	41.28%	693	58.38%	4	0.34%	-203	-17.10%	1,187
Trego	309	50.49%	294	48.04%	9	1.47%	15	2.45%	612
Wabaunsee	1,356	46.82%	1,520	52.49%	20	0.69%	-164	-5.67%	2,896
Wallace	377	55.93%	295	43.77%	2	0.30%	82	12.16%	674
Washington	2,323	44.80%	2,842	54.81%	20	0.39%	-519	-10.01%	5,185
Wichita	245	53.26%	214	46.52%	1	0.22%	31	6.74%	460
Wilson	1,803	51.80%	1,636	47.00%	42	1.21%	167	4.80%	3,481
Woodson	1,071	50.16%	1,032	48.34%	32	1.50%	39	1.82%	2,135
Wyandotte	5,889	51.10%	5,529	47.98%	106	0.92%	360	3.12%	11,524
Totals	157,241	48.40%	163,096 (Note: There is a difference of fifteen votes between this sum and Dave Leip’s total figure for the Weaver vote.)	50.20%	4,554	1.40%	-5,855	-1.80%	324,891

== See also ==
- United States presidential elections in Kansas
