= 1932 United States presidential election in Kansas =

- November 8, 1932

Nominee	Franklin D. Roosevelt	Herbert Hoover
Party	Democratic	Republican
Home state	New York	California
Running mate	John Nance Garner	Charles Curtis
Electoral vote	9	0
Popular vote	424,204	349,498
Percentage	53.56%	44.13%
County results
Roosevelt
40–50%
50–60%
60–70%
70–80%
Hoover
40–50%
50–60%
President before election
Herbert Hoover
Republican
Elected President
Franklin D. Roosevelt
Democratic

The 1932 United States presidential election in Kansas was held on November 8, 1932, as part of the 1932 United States presidential election held throughout all forty-eight contemporary states. State voters chose nine electors, or representatives to the Electoral College, who voted for President and Vice-president.

Kansas had been a powerfully Republican state during the 1920s (as it had been during its first quarter-century of statehood), although it did not possess the isolationist sentiment found in Appalachia or the Upper Midwest. In 1928 large-scale anti-Catholic voting swept a state substantially part of the Ozark "Bible Belt", so that whereas Kansas had been less anti-Democratic than more northerly Plains states in 1920 and 1924, it became Herbert Hoover’s best state in the entire nation at the next election cycle.

However, Hoover's first term saw disaster on two fronts for the Great Plains: the economic calamity of the Great Depression was combined with a major drought in the region from 1930 onwards. Consequently, agricultural states like Kansas, which had already been hit by declining prices during the 1920s, were severely affected by a wave of foreclosures and outmigration. Roosevelt, despite the strong Republican bent of the state, saw a major opportunity in the Plains States, visiting Kansas, Nebraska and South Dakota extensively during his campaign in September. Outside the prosperous northeast, Hoover's attempts at apologetics were a complete failure, with the result that Roosevelt carried every state west of the Appalachians. Kansas – the home state of incumbent Vice-president Curtis – was Hoover's strongest state west of the Mississippi, but he still lost ninety-one counties and almost twenty-eight percent of the vote vis-à-vis his overwhelming triumph against Smith in 1928.

This remains the only occasion ever in which the Democratic presidential nominee has carried Chautauqua County. As of the 2024 presidential election, this also remains the last time that the following counties have voted for a Democratic presidential candidate: Clay, Coffey, Dickinson, Elk, Jackson, Jefferson, Jewell, Linn, Logan, Marshall, Norton, Phillips, Pottawatomie, Republic, Smith, Wabaunsee, (Note: Independent Ross Perot did gain a plurality of the Wabaunsee County vote in the 1992 election.) Wallace, Washington, Wilson and Woodson. This was also the Democratic Party's best performance (in terms of margin) in Kansas to date, thereby making Kansas the solitary state in which no Democrat has ever won by double digits. This is also the last time a non-incumbent Democrat carried the state.

== Results ==
Electoral results
Presidential candidate	Party	Home state	Popular vote		Electoral vote	Running mate		
Presidential candidate	Party	Home state	Count	Percentage	Electoral vote	Vice-presidential candidate	Home state	Electoral vote
Franklin D. Roosevelt	Democrat	New York	424,204	53.56%	9	John Nance Garner	Texas	9
Herbert Hoover (incumbent)	Republican	California	349,498	44.13%	0	Charles Curtis (incumbent)	Kansas	0
Norman Thomas	Socialist	New York	18,276	2.31%	0	James H. Maurer	Pennsylvania	0
Total			791,978	100%	9			9
Needed to win					266			266

=== Results by county ===
1932 United States presidential election in Kansas by county
County	Franklin Delano Roosevelt Democratic		Herbert Clark Hoover Republican		Norman Mattoon Thomas Socialist		Margin		Total votes cast
County	#	%	#	%	#	%	#	%	Total votes cast
Allen	4,249	47.55%	4,510	50.47%	177	1.98%	-261	-2.92%	8,936
Anderson	3,580	58.92%	2,408	39.63%	88	1.45%	1,172	19.29%	6,076
Atchison	5,640	53.33%	4,778	45.18%	157	1.48%	862	8.15%	10,575
Barber	2,321	56.78%	1,671	40.88%	96	2.35%	650	15.90%	4,088
Barton	4,776	57.98%	3,365	40.85%	97	1.18%	1,411	17.13%	8,238
Bourbon	5,577	55.58%	4,277	42.62%	181	1.80%	1,300	12.95%	10,035
Brown	3,604	41.57%	5,005	57.73%	60	0.69%	-1,401	-16.16%	8,669
Butler	7,447	53.22%	6,116	43.70%	431	3.08%	1,331	9.51%	13,994
Chase	1,703	52.71%	1,485	45.96%	43	1.33%	218	6.75%	3,231
Chautauqua	2,263	51.90%	1,893	43.42%	204	4.68%	370	8.49%	4,360
Cherokee	7,442	62.64%	4,045	34.05%	393	3.31%	3,397	28.59%	11,880
Cheyenne	1,716	60.66%	979	34.61%	134	4.74%	737	26.05%	2,829
Clark	1,152	54.70%	938	44.54%	16	0.76%	214	10.16%	2,106
Clay	3,289	49.90%	3,115	47.26%	187	2.84%	174	2.64%	6,591
Cloud	4,457	57.05%	3,120	39.94%	235	3.01%	1,337	17.11%	7,812
Coffey	3,389	54.80%	2,707	43.77%	88	1.42%	682	11.03%	6,184
Comanche	1,175	54.60%	945	43.91%	32	1.49%	230	10.69%	2,152
Cowley	8,681	50.69%	7,657	44.71%	788	4.60%	1,024	5.98%	17,126
Crawford	10,994	59.75%	6,884	37.41%	523	2.84%	4,110	22.34%	18,401
Decatur	2,422	61.02%	1,439	36.26%	108	2.72%	983	24.77%	3,969
Dickinson	5,339	49.21%	5,320	49.04%	190	1.75%	19	0.18%	10,849
Doniphan	2,532	47.34%	2,748	51.37%	69	1.29%	-216	-4.04%	5,349
Douglas	4,833	38.60%	7,346	58.67%	342	2.73%	-2,513	-20.07%	12,521
Edwards	1,693	52.94%	1,420	44.40%	85	2.66%	273	8.54%	3,198
Elk	2,239	55.19%	1,746	43.04%	72	1.77%	493	12.15%	4,057
Ellis	4,449	74.52%	1,465	24.54%	56	0.94%	2,984	49.98%	5,970
Ellsworth	2,928	63.68%	1,607	34.95%	63	1.37%	1,321	28.73%	4,598
Finney	2,300	51.11%	2,116	47.02%	84	1.87%	184	4.09%	4,500
Ford	4,442	55.42%	3,335	41.61%	238	2.97%	1,107	13.81%	8,015
Franklin	4,690	48.14%	4,887	50.16%	165	1.69%	-197	-2.02%	9,742
Geary	2,705	56.55%	1,957	40.92%	121	2.53%	748	15.64%	4,783
Gove	1,186	52.02%	1,043	45.75%	51	2.24%	143	6.27%	2,280
Graham	2,082	60.10%	1,284	37.07%	98	2.83%	798	23.04%	3,464
Grant	737	62.88%	395	33.70%	40	3.41%	342	29.18%	1,172
Gray	1,348	58.18%	910	39.27%	59	2.55%	438	18.90%	2,317
Greeley	440	52.26%	359	42.64%	43	5.11%	81	9.62%	842
Greenwood	4,002	51.66%	3,592	46.37%	153	1.97%	410	5.29%	7,747
Hamilton	1,021	57.52%	651	36.68%	103	5.80%	370	20.85%	1,775
Harper	2,860	55.59%	2,116	41.13%	169	3.28%	744	14.46%	5,145
Harvey	4,091	48.09%	4,192	49.28%	224	2.63%	-101	-1.19%	8,507
Haskell	639	56.75%	456	40.50%	31	2.75%	183	16.25%	1,126
Hodgeman	988	53.15%	847	45.56%	24	1.29%	141	7.58%	1,859
Jackson	3,442	50.63%	3,271	48.11%	86	1.26%	171	2.52%	6,799
Jefferson	3,185	50.79%	2,974	47.42%	112	1.79%	211	3.36%	6,271
Jewell	3,367	48.83%	3,324	48.20%	205	2.97%	43	0.62%	6,896
Johnson	6,485	49.52%	6,487	49.53%	124	0.95%	-2	-0.02%	13,096
Kearny	771	56.73%	529	38.93%	59	4.34%	242	17.81%	1,359
Kingman	3,050	60.22%	1,923	37.97%	92	1.82%	1,127	22.25%	5,065
Kiowa	1,159	46.36%	1,306	52.24%	35	1.40%	-147	-5.88%	2,500
Labette	7,667	55.74%	5,794	42.12%	294	2.14%	1,873	13.62%	13,755
Lane	866	55.26%	672	42.88%	29	1.85%	194	12.38%	1,567
Leavenworth	9,507	59.00%	6,484	40.24%	123	0.76%	3,023	18.76%	16,114
Lincoln	2,297	56.70%	1,653	40.80%	101	2.49%	644	15.90%	4,051
Linn	3,216	54.02%	2,647	44.46%	90	1.51%	569	9.56%	5,953
Logan	1,025	52.32%	867	44.26%	67	3.42%	158	8.07%	1,959
Lyon	6,365	49.90%	6,044	47.38%	347	2.72%	321	2.52%	12,756
Marion	4,366	56.59%	3,220	41.74%	129	1.67%	1,146	14.85%	7,715
Marshall	5,970	56.62%	4,455	42.25%	119	1.13%	1,515	14.37%	10,544
McPherson	5,003	53.35%	4,098	43.70%	276	2.94%	905	9.65%	9,377
Meade	1,231	48.83%	1,248	49.50%	42	1.67%	-17	-0.67%	2,521
Miami	4,739	55.62%	3,667	43.04%	114	1.34%	1,072	12.58%	8,520
Mitchell	3,176	54.21%	2,502	42.70%	181	3.09%	674	11.50%	5,859
Montgomery	9,941	48.88%	9,958	48.96%	440	2.16%	-17	-0.08%	20,339
Morris	2,452	47.48%	2,566	49.69%	146	2.83%	-114	-2.21%	5,164
Morton	1,093	60.96%	621	34.63%	79	4.41%	472	26.32%	1,793
Nemaha	4,578	58.69%	3,167	40.60%	55	0.71%	1,411	18.09%	7,800
Neosho	5,616	56.36%	4,212	42.27%	137	1.37%	1,404	14.09%	9,965
Ness	1,772	53.63%	1,409	42.65%	123	3.72%	363	10.99%	3,304
Norton	2,705	52.58%	2,272	44.16%	168	3.27%	433	8.42%	5,145
Osage	4,199	51.43%	3,707	45.40%	259	3.17%	492	6.03%	8,165
Osborne	2,231	45.35%	2,555	51.94%	133	2.70%	-324	-6.59%	4,919
Ottawa	2,505	54.95%	1,884	41.32%	170	3.73%	621	13.62%	4,559
Pawnee	2,451	55.17%	1,889	42.52%	103	2.32%	562	12.65%	4,443
Phillips	3,007	56.45%	2,165	40.64%	155	2.91%	842	15.81%	5,327
Pottawatomie	3,910	53.23%	3,339	45.45%	97	1.32%	571	7.77%	7,346
Pratt	3,109	57.61%	2,167	40.15%	121	2.24%	942	17.45%	5,397
Rawlins	2,245	65.59%	1,064	31.08%	114	3.33%	1,181	34.50%	3,423
Reno	9,351	49.29%	8,972	47.30%	647	3.41%	379	2.00%	18,970
Republic	4,105	59.61%	2,655	38.55%	127	1.84%	1,450	21.05%	6,887
Rice	3,037	48.22%	3,107	49.33%	154	2.45%	-70	-1.11%	6,298
Riley	4,101	42.00%	5,337	54.65%	327	3.35%	-1,236	-12.66%	9,765
Rooks	2,229	51.57%	2,005	46.39%	88	2.04%	224	5.18%	4,322
Rush	2,275	60.28%	1,433	37.97%	66	1.75%	842	22.31%	3,774
Russell	2,723	58.80%	1,805	38.98%	103	2.22%	918	19.82%	4,631
Saline	7,118	55.73%	5,265	41.22%	389	3.05%	1,853	14.51%	12,772
Scott	1,092	62.47%	595	34.04%	61	3.49%	497	28.43%	1,748
Sedgwick	29,344	55.79%	21,815	41.48%	1,435	2.73%	7,529	14.32%	52,594
Seward	1,576	53.03%	1,297	43.64%	99	3.33%	279	9.39%	2,972
Shawnee	16,471	44.35%	19,847	53.44%	823	2.22%	-3,376	-9.09%	37,141
Sheridan	1,773	65.50%	878	32.43%	56	2.07%	895	33.06%	2,707
Sherman	2,110	61.09%	1,112	32.19%	232	6.72%	998	28.89%	3,454
Smith	3,155	51.14%	2,870	46.52%	144	2.33%	285	4.62%	6,169
Stafford	2,651	56.19%	1,945	41.23%	122	2.59%	706	14.96%	4,718
Stanton	598	58.40%	412	40.23%	14	1.37%	186	18.16%	1,024
Stevens	1,225	65.86%	578	31.08%	57	3.06%	647	34.78%	1,860
Sumner	6,353	54.68%	4,926	42.40%	340	2.93%	1,427	12.28%	11,619
Thomas	2,103	61.17%	1,158	33.68%	177	5.15%	945	27.49%	3,438
Trego	1,751	64.40%	918	33.76%	50	1.84%	833	30.64%	2,719
Wabaunsee	2,465	50.70%	2,304	47.39%	93	1.91%	161	3.31%	4,862
Wallace	761	54.63%	561	40.27%	71	5.10%	200	14.36%	1,393
Washington	4,234	55.32%	3,324	43.43%	95	1.24%	910	11.89%	7,653
Wichita	732	64.27%	375	32.92%	32	2.81%	357	31.34%	1,139
Wilson	4,001	52.53%	3,422	44.93%	193	2.53%	579	7.60%	7,616
Woodson	2,119	51.96%	1,842	45.17%	117	2.87%	277	6.79%	4,078
Wyandotte	32,629	55.47%	25,471	43.30%	721	1.23%	7,158	12.17%	58,821
Totals	424,204	53.56%	349,498	44.13%	18,276	2.31%	74,706	9.43%	791,978

==== Counties that flipped from Republican to Democratic ====
- Anderson
- Atchison
- Barber
- Barton
- Bourbon
- Butler
- Chase
- Chautauqua
- Cherokee
- Cheyenne
- Clark
- Clay
- Cloud
- Coffey
- Comanche
- Cowley
- Crawford
- Decatur
- Dickinson
- Edwards
- Elk
- Ellsworth
- Finney
- Ford
- Geary
- Gove
- Graham
- Grant
- Gray
- Greeley
- Greenwood
- Hamilton
- Harper
- Harvey
- Haskell
- Hodgeman
- Jackson
- Jefferson
- Jewell
- Kearny
- Kingman
- Kiowa
- Labette
- Lane
- Leavenworth
- Lincoln
- Linn
- Logan
- Lyon
- Marion
- Marshall
- McPherson
- Meade
- Miami
- Mitchell
- Morris
- Morton
- Nemaha
- Neosho
- Ness
- Norton
- Osage
- Ottawa
- Pawnee
- Phillips
- Pottawatomie
- Pratt
- Rawlins
- Republic
- Reno
- Rice
- Rooks
- Rush
- Russell
- Saline
- Scott
- Sedgwick
- Seward
- Shawnee
- Sheridan
- Sherman
- Smith
- Stafford
- Stanton
- Stevens
- Sumner
- Thomas
- Trego
- Wabaunsee
- Wallace
- Washington
- Wichita
- Wilson
- Woodson
- Wyandotte

== See also ==
- United States presidential elections in Kansas
