= Deerfield Township, Kansas =

Deerfield Township
- Township
- Location in Kearny County
- Coordinates: 38°01′04″N 101°08′22″W
- Country: United States
- State: Kansas
- County: Kearny

Area
  - Total: 46.5 sq mi (120.4 km^{2})
  - Land: 46.2 sq mi (119.6 km^{2})
  - Water: 0.31 sq mi (0.8 km^{2}) 0.66%
- Elevation: 3,009 ft (917 m)

Population (2020)
  - Total: 847
  - Density: 18.3/sq mi (7.08/km^{2})
- GNIS feature ID: 0471603

Deerfield Township is a township in Kearny County, Kansas, United States. As of the 2020 census, its population was 847.

== Geography ==
Deerfield Township covers an area of 46.49 square miles (120.4 square kilometers); of this, 0.31 square miles (0.8 square kilometers) or 0.66 percent is water.

=== Communities ===
- Deerfield

=== Adjacent townships ===
- East Hibbard Township (north)
- Sherlock Township, Finney County (southeast)
- Southside Township (south)
- Lakin Township (west)

=== Cemeteries ===
The township contains one cemetery, Deer Field.

=== Major highways ===
- U.S. Route 50
