= East Hibbard Township, Kansas =

East Hibbard Township
- Township
- Location in Kearny County
- Coordinates: 38°10′12″N 101°12′46″W
- Country: United States
- State: Kansas
- County: Kearny

Area
  - Total: 155.58 sq mi (402.94 km^{2})
  - Land: 155.58 sq mi (402.94 km^{2})
  - Water: 0 sq mi (0 km^{2}) 0%
- Elevation: 3,192 ft (973 m)

Population (2020)
  - Total: 68
  - Density: 0.44/sq mi (0.17/km^{2})
- GNIS feature ID: 0485249

East Hibbard Township is a township in Kearny County, Kansas, United States. As of the 2020 census, its population was 68.

== Geography ==
East Hibbard Township covers an area of 155.58 square miles (402.94 square kilometers).

=== Adjacent townships ===
- Valley Township, Scott County (northeast)
- Terry Township, Finney County (east)
- Sherlock Township, Finney County (southeast)
- Deerfield Township (south)
- Lakin Township (south)
- Hartland Township (southwest)
- West Hibbard Township (west)
- Leoti Township, Wichita County (northwest)

=== Major highways ===
- K-25

=== Airports and landing strips ===
- Dienst Ranch Airport
