= Kearny County, Kansas =

County in Kansas, United States

- County
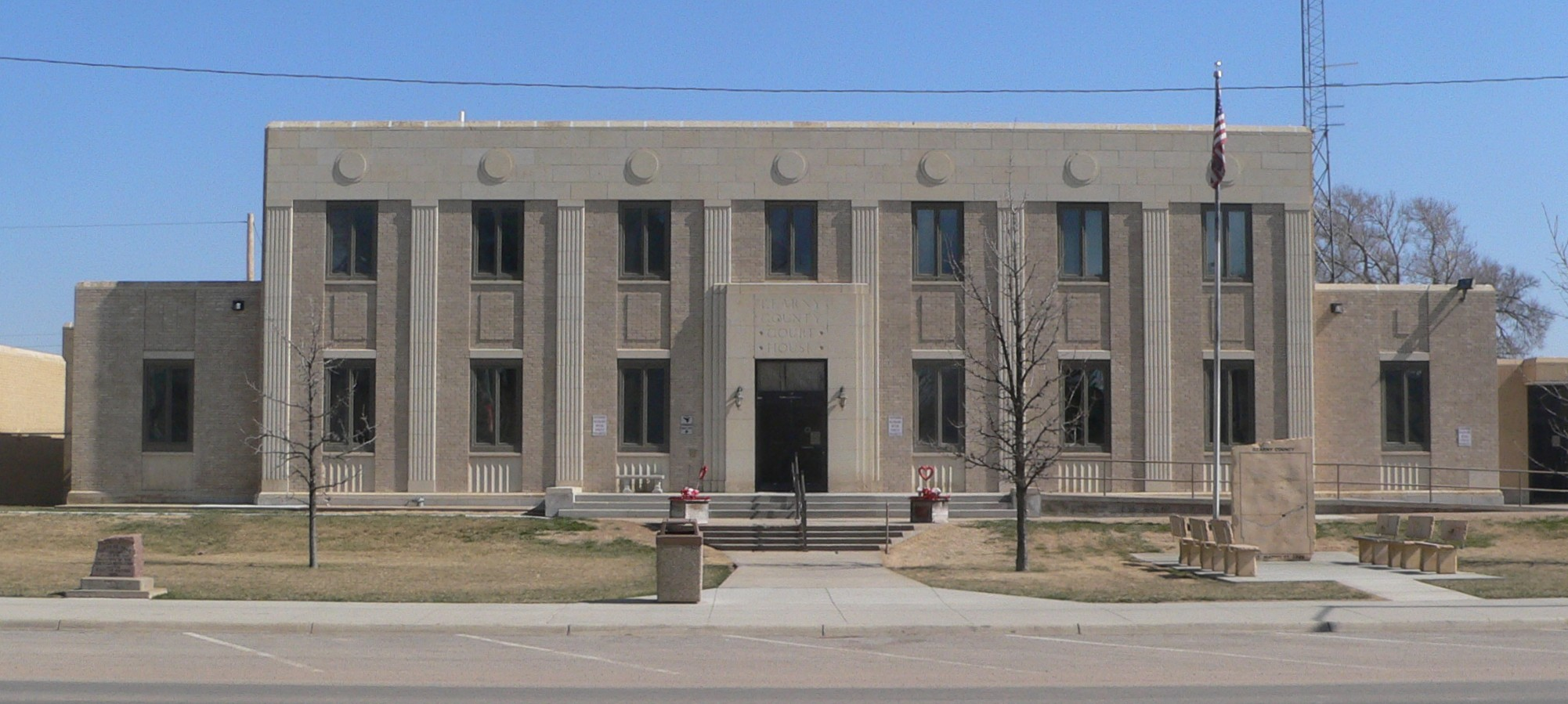
- Kearny County Courthouse in Lakin (2015)

- Location within the U.S. state of Kansas
- Coordinates: 38°00′29″N 101°08′54″W
- Country: United States
- State: Kansas
- Founded: March 20, 1873
- Named for: Philip Kearny
- Seat: Lakin
- Largest city: Lakin

Area
  - Total: 871 sq mi (2,260 km^{2})
  - Land: 871 sq mi (2,260 km^{2})
  - Water: 0.4 sq mi (1.0 km^{2}) 0.05%

Population (2020)
  - Total: 3,983
  - Estimate (2025): 3,888 ▼
  - Density: 4.6/sq mi (1.8/km^{2})
- Time zone: UTC−6 (Central)
  - Summer (DST): UTC−5 (CDT)
- Congressional district: 1st
- Website: KearnyCountyKansas.com

1893 map of Kansas showing Kearney County spelled with an extra "e"

Kearny County (/ˈkɑːrni/ KAR-nee) is a county located in the U.S. state of Kansas. Its county seat and most populous city is Lakin. As of the 2020 census, the county population was 3,983. The county is named in honor of Philip Kearny, a general during the American Civil War that died during the Battle of Chantilly.

== History ==
The original Kearney County was established on March 6, 1873, and was dissolved in 1883, with the land area being split between Hamilton and Finney counties. It was reestablished with its original borders in 1887, and organized on March 27, 1888. The county is named in honor of Philip Kearny, a U.S. Army officer in the Mexican–American War and a Union army general in the American Civil War. In 1889, the name was corrected to Kearny County.

Prior to settlement, Kearny County was unorganized territory that was entirely "cow country," undeveloped and with no agricultural activity except for cattlemen grazing their herds. The region was part of the vast open range found in the American West at that time.

In the mid-1880s, homesteaders began pouring into the area, initiating conflicts with the existing cattle ranching industry as they claimed land and fenced off the open range. Towns like Leeser, established in 1885, and Pierceville, est. 1886, were built to service the cattle industry, but disappeared as homesteading displaced the great cattle herds.

The arrival of homesteaders was seen as both an opportunity for development but also a threat to the cattle industry's way of life, with numerous allegations of ranchers trying to drive settlers out by destroying crops and setting prairie fires appearing in local newspapers.

In the 1930s, the prosperity of the area was severely affected by its location within the Dust Bowl. This catastrophe intensified the economic impact of the Great Depression in the region.

== Geography ==
According to the U.S. Census Bureau, the county has a total area of 871 square miles (2,260 km^{2}), of which 871 square miles (2,260 km^{2}) is land and 0.4 square miles (1.0 km^{2}) (0.05%) is water.

=== Major highways ===
- U.S. Highway 50
- U.S. Highway 400
- K-25

=== Time zones ===
The west half of Kearny County observed Mountain Standard Time until October 28, 1990, when the Kansas Department of Transportation moved the entire county into the Central Time Zone, which 100 of the state's other 104 counties observe. Only four counties (Hamilton, Greeley, Wallace, and Sherman), all of which border Colorado, observe Mountain Time.

=== Adjacent counties ===
- Wichita County (north)
- Scott County (northeast)
- Finney County (east)
- Grant County (south)
- Stanton County (southwest)
- Hamilton County (west/Mountain Time border)

== Demographics ==
Historical population
Census	Pop.	Note	%±
1880	159		—
1890	1,571		888.1%
1900	1,107		−29.5%
1910	3,206		189.6%
1920	2,617		−18.4%
1930	3,196		22.1%
1940	2,525		−21.0%
1950	3,492		38.3%
1960	3,108		−11.0%
1970	3,047		−2.0%
1980	3,435		12.7%
1990	4,027		17.2%
2000	4,531		12.5%
2010	3,977		−12.2%
2020	3,983		0.2%
2025 (est.)	3,888	▼	−2.4%
U.S. Decennial Census; 1790-1960 1900-1990; 1990-2000 2010-2020

Kearny County is included in the Garden City, KS Micropolitan Statistical Area.

=== 2020 census ===
As of the 2020 census, the county had a population of 3,983. The median age was 35.0 years, with 28.9% of residents under the age of 18 and 15.4% 65 years of age or older. For every 100 females there were 102.3 males, and for every 100 females age 18 and over there were 97.8 males age 18 and over. None of the residents lived in urban areas, while 100.0% lived in rural areas.

The racial makeup of the county was 66.8% White, 1.0% Black or African American, 0.9% American Indian and Alaska Native, 0.2% Asian, 0.0% Native Hawaiian and Pacific Islander, 12.4% from some other race, and 18.7% from two or more races. Hispanic or Latino residents of any race comprised 35.0% of the population.

There were 1,427 households in the county, of which 39.5% had children under the age of 18 living with them and 20.5% had a female householder with no spouse or partner present. About 22.8% of all households were made up of individuals and 10.0% had someone living alone who was 65 years of age or older.

There were 1,581 housing units, of which 9.7% were vacant. Among occupied housing units, 72.3% were owner-occupied and 27.7% were renter-occupied. The homeowner vacancy rate was 1.2% and the rental vacancy rate was 8.5%.

=== 2000 census ===
As of the 2000 census, there were 4,531 people, 1,542 households, and 1,199 families residing in the county. The population density was 5 people per square mile (1.9 people/km^{2}). There were 1,657 housing units at an average density of 2 per square mile (0.77/km^{2}). The racial makeup of the county was 80.34% White, 0.55% Black or African American, 0.86% Native American, 0.31% Asian, 0.09% Pacific Islander, 15.71% from other races, and 2.14% from two or more races. Hispanic or Latino of any race were 26.55% of the population.

There were 1,542 households, out of which 43.50% had children under the age of 18 living with them, 65.10% were married couples living together, 8.30% had a female householder with no husband present, and 22.20% were non-families. 20.20% of all households were made up of individuals, and 8.50% had someone living alone who was 65 years of age or older. The average household size was 2.91 and the average family size was 3.35.

In the county, the population was spread out, with 34.30% under the age of 18, 8.30% from 18 to 24, 27.10% from 25 to 44, 19.20% from 45 to 64, and 11.10% who were 65 years of age or older. The median age was 32 years. For every 100 females there were 104.70 males. For every 100 females age 18 and over, there were 98.50 males.

The median income for a household in the county was $40,149, and the median income for a family was $43,703. Males had a median income of $30,117 versus $20,179 for females. The per capita income for the county was $15,708. About 8.40% of families and 11.70% of the population were below the poverty line, including 15.90% of those under age 18 and 4.80% of those age 65 or over.

== Government ==
=== Presidential elections ===
Presidential election results

United States presidential election results for Kearny County, Kansas
Year	Republican		Democratic		Third party(ies)	
Year	No.	%	No.	%	No.	%
1888	367	59.39%	248	40.13%	3	0.49%
1892	219	60.83%	0	0.00%	141	39.17%
1896	172	49.43%	175	50.29%	1	0.29%
1900	164	53.77%	137	44.92%	4	1.31%
1904	234	70.69%	94	28.40%	3	0.91%
1908	435	56.64%	304	39.58%	29	3.78%
1912	113	17.02%	236	35.54%	315	47.44%
1916	538	45.29%	490	41.25%	160	13.47%
1920	617	63.74%	266	27.48%	85	8.78%
1924	635	57.57%	199	18.04%	269	24.39%
1928	854	77.22%	229	20.71%	23	2.08%
1932	529	38.93%	771	56.73%	59	4.34%
1936	586	44.63%	716	54.53%	11	0.84%
1940	721	58.00%	519	41.75%	3	0.24%
1944	612	62.45%	365	37.24%	3	0.31%
1948	676	54.43%	541	43.56%	25	2.01%
1952	1,012	72.81%	362	26.04%	16	1.15%
1956	854	66.98%	418	32.78%	3	0.24%
1960	846	62.11%	513	37.67%	3	0.22%
1964	563	42.81%	737	56.05%	15	1.14%
1968	721	58.00%	423	34.03%	99	7.96%
1972	876	70.87%	325	26.29%	35	2.83%
1976	674	48.95%	658	47.79%	45	3.27%
1980	924	66.38%	375	26.94%	93	6.68%
1984	1,214	78.42%	321	20.74%	13	0.84%
1988	1,073	66.03%	524	32.25%	28	1.72%
1992	943	55.18%	384	22.47%	382	22.35%
1996	1,041	70.05%	335	22.54%	110	7.40%
2000	1,084	75.54%	320	22.30%	31	2.16%
2004	1,177	80.89%	272	18.69%	6	0.41%
2008	1,159	78.21%	309	20.85%	14	0.94%
2012	1,097	79.15%	268	19.34%	21	1.52%
2016	1,075	81.69%	174	13.22%	67	5.09%
2020	1,164	80.00%	267	18.35%	24	1.65%
2024	1,082	83.17%	192	14.76%	27	2.08%

=== Laws ===
Following amendment to the Kansas Constitution in 1986, the county remained a prohibition, or "dry", county until 1988, when voters approved the sale of alcoholic liquor by the individual drink with a 30 percent food sales requirement.

== Education ==
=== Unified school districts ===
- Lakin USD 215
- Deerfield USD 216

== Communities ==
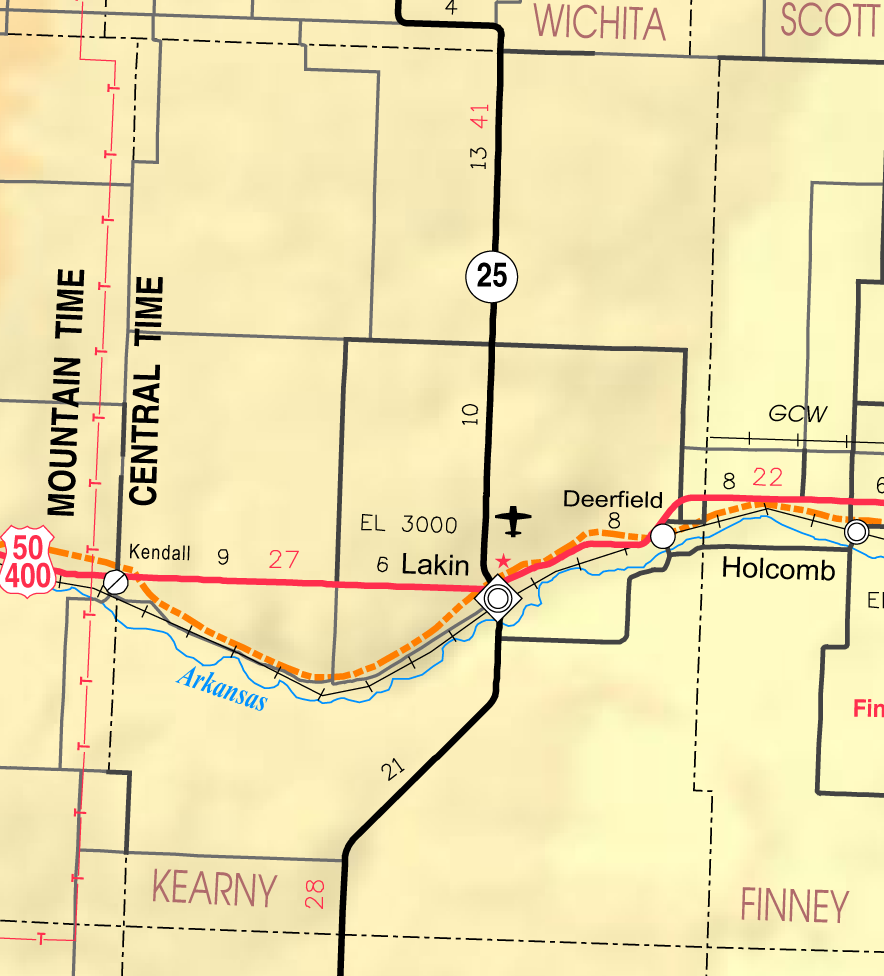
2005 map of Kearny County (map legend)

List of townships / incorporated cities / unincorporated communities / extinct former communities within Kearny County.

=== Cities ===
- Deerfield
- Lakin (county seat)

=== Townships ===
Area affected by 1930s Dust Bowl

Kearny County is divided into seven townships. None of the cities within the county are considered governmentally independent, and all figures for the townships include those of the cities. In the following table, the population center is the largest city (or cities) included in that township's population total, if it is of a significant size.

Township	FIPS	Population center	Population	Population density /km^{2} (/sq mi)	Land area km^{2} (sq mi)	Water area km^{2} (sq mi)	Water %	Geographic coordinates
Deerfield	17250	Deerfield	1,104	9 (24)	120 (46)	1 (0)	0.66%	38°0′30″N 101°8′55″W
East Hibbard	19550		131	0 (1)	403 (156)	0 (0)	0%	38°9′19″N 101°12′14″W
Hartland	30500		128	0 (1)	388 (150)	0 (0)	0.03%	38°0′44″N 101°24′49″W
Kendall	36450		157	0 (1)	494 (191)	0 (0)	0%	37°46′56″N 101°18′32″W
Lakin	38200	Lakin	2,587	16 (41)	164 (63)	0 (0)	0.04%	37°57′16″N 101°15′45″W
Southside	67025		359	1 (3)	286 (110)	0 (0)	0.06%	37°55′9″N 101°12′12″W
West Hibbard	77050		65	0 (0)	402 (155)	0 (0)	0%	38°10′10″N 101°25′23″W
Sources: "Census 2000 U.S. Gazetteer Files". U.S. Census Bureau, Geography Division. Archived from the original on August 2, 2002.

== See also ==
Community information for Kansas

- Kansas locations by per capita income
- List of counties in Kansas
- List of townships in Kansas
- List of cities in Kansas
- List of unincorporated communities in Kansas
- List of ghost towns in Kansas
