= 1952 United States presidential election in Kansas =

- November 4, 1952

All 8 Kansas votes to the Electoral College

Nominee	Dwight D. Eisenhower	Adlai Stevenson
Party	Republican	Democratic
Home state	Kansas	Illinois
Running mate	Richard Nixon	John Sparkman
Electoral vote	8	0
Popular vote	616,302	273,296
Percentage	68.77%	30.50%
County results
Eisenhower
50–60%
60–70%
70–80%
80–90%
Stevenson
50–60%
President before election
Harry S. Truman
Democratic
Elected President
Dwight D. Eisenhower
Republican

The 1952 United States presidential election in Kansas took place on November 4, 1952, as part of the 1952 United States presidential election. Voters chose eight representatives, or electors, to the Electoral College, who voted for president and vice president.

Kansas was won by Columbia University President Dwight D. Eisenhower (R–New York), running with Senator Richard Nixon, with 68.77 percent of the popular vote, against Adlai Stevenson (D–Illinois), running with Senator John Sparkman, with 30.50 percent of the popular vote.

Kansas is reliably Republican, with the party's nominee losing the state only three times since 1920. This, combined with the fact that Eisenhower was raised in Abilene (the seat of Dickinson County), made the results from Kansas among the least surprising of the 1952 election.

With 68.77 percent of the popular vote, Kansas would prove to be Eisenhower's fifth strongest state after Vermont, North Dakota, South Dakota and Nebraska.

== Results ==
1952 United States presidential election in Kansas
Party	Candidate	Votes	%
Republican	Dwight D. Eisenhower	616,302	68.77%
Democratic	Adlai Stevenson	273,296	30.50%
Prohibition	Stuart Hamblen	6,038	0.67%
Socialist	Darlington Hoopes	530	0.06%
Total votes		896,166	100%

=== Results by county ===
County	Dwight D. Eisenhower Republican		Adlai Stevenson Democratic		Stuart Hamblen Prohibition		Darlington Hoopes Socialist		Margin		Total votes cast
County	#	%	#	%	#	%	#	%	#	%	Total votes cast
Allen	6,045	73.40%	2,160	26.23%	28	0.34%	3	0.04%	3,885	47.17%	8,236
Anderson	3,672	73.18%	1,333	26.56%	12	0.24%	1	0.02%	2,339	46.62%	5,018
Atchison	6,004	64.59%	3,283	35.32%	6	0.06%	3	0.03%	2,721	29.27%	9,296
Barber	3,071	74.09%	1,028	24.80%	42	1.01%	4	0.10%	2,043	49.29%	4,145
Barton	9,380	70.43%	3,847	28.88%	84	0.63%	8	0.06%	5,533	41.55%	13,319
Bourbon	5,785	65.26%	3,023	34.10%	50	0.56%	6	0.07%	2,762	31.16%	8,864
Brown	6,031	80.51%	1,440	19.22%	19	0.25%	1	0.01%	4,591	61.29%	7,491
Butler	10,179	65.04%	5,359	34.24%	104	0.66%	9	0.06%	4,820	30.80%	15,651
Chase	1,815	77.76%	513	21.98%	6	0.26%	0	0.00%	1,302	55.78%	2,334
Chautauqua	2,542	74.76%	837	24.62%	20	0.59%	1	0.03%	1,705	50.14%	3,400
Cherokee	6,261	57.37%	4,597	42.12%	45	0.41%	11	0.10%	1,664	15.25%	10,914
Cheyenne	1,915	75.63%	597	23.58%	20	0.79%	0	0.00%	1,318	52.05%	2,532
Clark	1,410	73.28%	479	24.90%	34	1.77%	1	0.05%	931	48.38%	1,924
Clay	5,059	84.87%	831	13.94%	64	1.07%	7	0.12%	4,228	70.93%	5,961
Cloud	5,580	75.23%	1,793	24.17%	40	0.54%	4	0.05%	3,787	51.06%	7,417
Coffey	3,731	74.78%	1,239	24.83%	15	0.30%	4	0.08%	2,492	49.95%	4,989
Comanche	1,443	78.98%	374	20.47%	9	0.49%	1	0.05%	1,069	58.51%	1,827
Cowley	11,454	68.13%	5,242	31.18%	106	0.63%	10	0.06%	6,212	36.95%	16,812
Crawford	10,646	55.81%	8,349	43.77%	64	0.34%	15	0.08%	2,297	12.04%	19,074
Decatur	2,451	74.54%	821	24.97%	15	0.46%	1	0.03%	1,630	49.57%	3,288
Dickinson	8,969	81.78%	1,967	17.94%	28	0.26%	3	0.03%	7,002	63.84%	10,967
Doniphan	3,711	75.70%	1,175	23.97%	7	0.14%	9	0.18%	2,536	51.73%	4,902
Douglas	11,095	74.34%	3,765	25.23%	54	0.36%	10	0.07%	7,330	49.11%	14,924
Edwards	2,192	76.40%	647	22.55%	25	0.87%	5	0.17%	1,545	53.85%	2,869
Elk	2,380	76.38%	717	23.01%	16	0.51%	3	0.10%	1,663	53.37%	3,116
Ellis	4,882	65.86%	2,528	34.10%	3	0.04%	0	0.00%	2,354	31.76%	7,413
Ellsworth	3,219	74.67%	1,068	24.77%	24	0.56%	0	0.00%	2,151	49.90%	4,311
Finney	4,290	72.32%	1,597	26.92%	45	0.76%	0	0.00%	2,693	45.40%	5,932
Ford	6,359	68.96%	2,748	29.80%	108	1.17%	6	0.07%	3,611	39.16%	9,221
Franklin	6,983	72.86%	2,532	26.42%	62	0.65%	7	0.07%	4,451	46.44%	9,584
Geary	4,314	70.54%	1,750	28.61%	47	0.77%	5	0.08%	2,564	41.93%	6,116
Gove	1,453	75.84%	453	23.64%	8	0.42%	2	0.10%	1,000	52.20%	1,916
Graham	1,859	72.62%	686	26.80%	15	0.59%	0	0.00%	1,173	45.82%	2,560
Grant	1,277	71.02%	502	27.92%	18	1.00%	1	0.06%	775	43.10%	1,798
Gray	1,515	73.51%	537	26.06%	8	0.39%	1	0.05%	978	47.45%	2,061
Greeley	725	79.06%	181	19.74%	11	1.20%	0	0.00%	544	59.32%	917
Greenwood	4,974	73.70%	1,743	25.83%	30	0.44%	2	0.03%	3,231	47.87%	6,749
Hamilton	1,209	72.70%	437	26.28%	17	1.02%	0	0.00%	772	46.42%	1,663
Harper	3,575	78.62%	927	20.39%	42	0.92%	3	0.07%	2,648	58.23%	4,547
Harvey	7,154	70.87%	2,726	27.00%	201	1.99%	14	0.14%	4,428	43.87%	10,095
Haskell	870	74.30%	283	24.17%	17	1.45%	1	0.09%	587	50.13%	1,171
Hodgeman	1,330	76.44%	392	22.53%	17	0.98%	1	0.06%	938	53.91%	1,740
Jackson	4,161	75.28%	1,358	24.57%	6	0.11%	2	0.04%	2,803	50.71%	5,527
Jefferson	3,980	73.47%	1,411	26.05%	25	0.46%	1	0.02%	2,569	47.42%	5,417
Jewell	4,162	80.86%	885	17.19%	93	1.81%	7	0.14%	3,277	63.67%	5,147
Johnson	29,103	72.46%	10,990	27.36%	62	0.15%	8	0.02%	18,113	45.10%	40,163
Kearny	1,012	72.81%	362	26.04%	16	1.15%	0	0.00%	650	46.77%	1,390
Kingman	3,820	76.52%	1,096	21.96%	73	1.46%	3	0.06%	2,724	54.56%	4,992
Kiowa	1,838	78.61%	432	18.48%	68	2.91%	0	0.00%	1,406	60.13%	2,338
Labette	8,624	61.99%	5,219	37.51%	64	0.46%	6	0.04%	3,405	24.48%	13,913
Lane	1,142	77.85%	311	21.20%	13	0.89%	1	0.07%	831	56.65%	1,467
Leavenworth	9,046	61.19%	5,698	38.54%	28	0.19%	11	0.07%	3,348	22.65%	14,783
Lincoln	2,841	84.63%	507	15.10%	8	0.24%	1	0.03%	2,334	69.53%	3,357
Linn	3,527	73.99%	1,220	25.59%	19	0.40%	1	0.02%	2,307	48.40%	4,767
Logan	1,544	79.96%	369	19.11%	17	0.88%	1	0.05%	1,175	60.85%	1,931
Lyon	8,544	67.98%	3,944	31.38%	77	0.61%	3	0.02%	4,600	36.60%	12,568
Marion	6,228	80.19%	1,361	17.52%	167	2.15%	11	0.14%	4,867	62.67%	7,767
Marshall	6,851	75.35%	2,215	24.36%	22	0.24%	4	0.04%	4,636	50.99%	9,092
McPherson	8,053	74.58%	2,371	21.96%	362	3.35%	12	0.11%	5,682	52.62%	10,798
Meade	2,061	76.90%	568	21.19%	48	1.79%	3	0.11%	1,493	55.71%	2,680
Miami	5,623	62.33%	3,374	37.40%	23	0.25%	2	0.02%	2,249	24.93%	9,022
Mitchell	4,167	80.98%	961	18.67%	16	0.31%	2	0.04%	3,206	62.31%	5,146
Montgomery	14,261	64.62%	7,679	34.79%	121	0.55%	9	0.04%	6,582	29.83%	22,070
Morris	3,263	74.11%	1,124	25.53%	13	0.30%	3	0.07%	2,139	48.58%	4,403
Morton	893	69.93%	362	28.35%	22	1.72%	0	0.00%	531	41.58%	1,277
Nemaha	5,175	75.97%	1,618	23.75%	18	0.26%	1	0.01%	3,557	52.22%	6,812
Neosho	6,595	68.60%	2,987	31.07%	26	0.27%	6	0.06%	3,608	37.53%	9,614
Ness	2,288	76.27%	664	22.13%	43	1.43%	5	0.17%	1,624	54.14%	3,000
Norton	3,530	76.23%	1,047	22.61%	47	1.01%	7	0.15%	2,483	53.62%	4,631
Osage	4,589	68.84%	2,036	30.54%	33	0.50%	8	0.12%	2,553	38.30%	6,666
Osborne	3,577	81.24%	754	17.12%	64	1.45%	8	0.18%	2,823	64.12%	4,403
Ottawa	2,916	77.66%	801	21.33%	35	0.93%	3	0.08%	2,115	56.33%	3,755
Pawnee	3,431	71.12%	1,340	27.78%	52	1.08%	1	0.02%	2,091	43.34%	4,824
Phillips	3,713	80.18%	884	19.09%	33	0.71%	1	0.02%	2,829	61.09%	4,631
Pottawatomie	4,944	77.94%	1,387	21.87%	11	0.17%	1	0.02%	3,557	56.07%	6,343
Pratt	3,998	68.87%	1,743	30.03%	62	1.07%	2	0.03%	2,255	38.84%	5,805
Rawlins	2,120	75.82%	670	23.96%	4	0.14%	2	0.07%	1,450	51.86%	2,796
Reno	15,762	68.58%	6,555	28.52%	652	2.84%	14	0.06%	9,207	40.06%	22,983
Republic	4,573	76.72%	1,358	22.78%	29	0.49%	1	0.02%	3,215	53.94%	5,961
Rice	5,572	74.51%	1,832	24.50%	69	0.92%	5	0.07%	3,740	50.01%	7,478
Riley	9,799	80.31%	2,352	19.28%	43	0.35%	7	0.06%	7,447	61.03%	12,201
Rooks	3,331	74.32%	1,105	24.65%	40	0.89%	6	0.13%	2,226	49.67%	4,482
Rush	2,650	75.50%	843	24.02%	16	0.46%	1	0.03%	1,807	51.48%	3,510
Russell	4,813	76.00%	1,499	23.67%	19	0.30%	2	0.03%	3,314	52.33%	6,333
Saline	12,326	75.12%	4,003	24.40%	68	0.41%	12	0.07%	8,323	50.72%	16,409
Scott	1,681	78.33%	443	20.64%	21	0.98%	1	0.05%	1,238	57.69%	2,146
Sedgwick	70,983	66.47%	34,926	32.71%	820	0.77%	59	0.06%	36,057	33.76%	106,788
Seward	3,136	72.79%	1,146	26.60%	24	0.56%	2	0.05%	1,990	46.19%	4,308
Shawnee	33,201	65.01%	17,651	34.56%	187	0.37%	28	0.05%	15,550	30.45%	51,067
Sheridan	1,581	73.88%	555	25.93%	3	0.14%	1	0.05%	1,026	47.95%	2,140
Sherman	2,403	70.41%	941	27.57%	65	1.90%	4	0.12%	1,462	42.84%	3,413
Smith	3,623	77.75%	986	21.16%	51	1.09%	0	0.00%	2,637	56.59%	4,660
Stafford	3,162	71.28%	1,174	26.47%	97	2.19%	3	0.07%	1,988	44.81%	4,436
Stanton	664	74.61%	215	24.16%	11	1.24%	0	0.00%	449	50.45%	890
Stevens	1,480	77.16%	423	22.05%	14	0.73%	1	0.05%	1,057	55.11%	1,918
Sumner	8,134	68.95%	3,567	30.24%	86	0.73%	10	0.08%	4,567	38.71%	11,797
Thomas	2,490	69.46%	1,069	29.82%	20	0.56%	6	0.17%	1,421	39.64%	3,585
Trego	1,915	75.60%	608	24.00%	10	0.39%	0	0.00%	1,307	51.60%	2,533
Wabaunsee	3,182	81.03%	736	18.74%	7	0.18%	2	0.05%	2,446	62.29%	3,927
Wallace	945	78.82%	249	20.77%	5	0.42%	0	0.00%	696	58.05%	1,199
Washington	5,135	81.39%	1,148	18.20%	21	0.33%	5	0.08%	3,987	63.19%	6,309
Wichita	910	75.90%	276	23.02%	12	1.00%	1	0.08%	634	52.88%	1,199
Wilson	5,180	73.18%	1,845	26.07%	48	0.68%	5	0.07%	3,335	47.11%	7,078
Woodson	2,594	76.29%	786	23.12%	13	0.38%	7	0.21%	1,808	53.17%	3,400
Wyandotte	34,648	47.04%	38,751	52.61%	210	0.29%	48	0.07%	-4,103	-5.57%	73,657
Totals	616,302	68.77%	273,296	30.50%	6,038	0.67%	530	0.06%	343,006	38.27%	896,166

==== Counties that flipped from Democratic to Republican ====
- Crawford
- Cherokee
- Ellis
- Ford
- Leavenworth
- Miami

== See also ==
- United States presidential elections in Kansas
