= 1928 United States presidential election in Kansas =

- November 6, 1928

Nominee	Herbert Hoover	Al Smith
Party	Republican	Democratic
Home state	California	New York
Running mate	Charles Curtis	Joseph Taylor Robinson
Electoral vote	10	0
Popular vote	513,672	193,003
Percentage	72.02%	27.06%
County results
Hoover
50–60%
60–70%
70–80%
80–90%
Smith
60–70%
President before election
Calvin Coolidge
Republican
Elected President
Herbert Hoover
Republican

The 1928 United States presidential election in Kansas took place on November 6, 1928, as part of the 1928 United States presidential election which was held throughout all contemporary 48 states. Voters chose ten representatives, or electors to the Electoral College, who voted for president and vice president.

Kansas voted for the Republican nominee, former Secretary of Commerce Herbert Hoover of California, over the Democratic nominee, Governor Alfred E. Smith of New York. Hoover's running mate was Senate Majority Leader Charles Curtis of Kansas, while Smith ran with Senator Joseph Taylor Robinson of Arkansas. Hoover won the state by a margin of 44.96 points.

Smith only carried Ellis County, which had (and still has) a large percentage of Roman Catholic residents. Smith was the first Roman Catholic to earn the nomination of a major party for president.

With 72.02 percent of the popular vote, Kansas would prove to be Hoover's strongest state in the 1928 presidential election in terms of popular vote percentage.

== Results ==
1928 United States presidential election in Kansas
Party	Candidate	Running mate	Popular vote		Electoral vote	
Party	Candidate	Running mate	Count	%	Count	%
Republican	Herbert Hoover of California	Charles Curtis of Kansas	513,672	72.02%	10	100.00%
Democratic	Al Smith of New York	Joseph Taylor Robinson of Arkansas	193,003	27.06%	0	0.00%
Socialist	Norman Thomas of New York	James Hudson Maurer of Pennsylvania	6,205	0.87%	0	0.00%
Independent	William Z. Foster of Massachusetts	Benjamin Gitlow of New York	320	0.04%	0	0.00%
Total			713,200	100.00%	10	100.00%

=== Results by county ===
1928 United States presidential election in Kansas by county
County	Herbert Clark Hoover Republican		Alfred Emmanuel Smith Democratic		Norman Mattoon Thomas Socialist		William Zebulon Foster Independent		Margin		Total votes cast
County	#	%	#	%	#	%	#	%	#	%	Total votes cast
Allen	6,695	78.30%	1,803	21.09%	49	0.57%	3	0.04%	4,892	57.22%	8,550
Anderson	3,562	64.94%	1,874	34.17%	41	0.75%	8	0.15%	1,688	30.77%	5,485
Atchison	6,647	63.67%	3,756	35.98%	37	0.35%	0	0.00%	2,891	27.69%	10,440
Barber	2,984	76.43%	871	22.31%	47	1.20%	2	0.05%	2,113	54.12%	3,904
Barton	4,966	63.94%	2,777	35.75%	21	0.27%	3	0.04%	2,189	28.18%	7,767
Bourbon	7,251	75.88%	2,223	23.26%	82	0.86%	0	0.00%	5,028	52.62%	9,556
Brown	6,692	76.77%	2,005	23.00%	16	0.18%	4	0.05%	4,687	53.77%	8,717
Butler	10,168	79.43%	2,533	19.79%	101	0.79%	0	0.00%	7,635	59.64%	12,802
Chase	2,079	72.79%	739	25.88%	36	1.26%	2	0.07%	1,340	46.92%	2,856
Chautauqua	3,303	75.97%	944	21.71%	94	2.16%	7	0.16%	2,359	54.25%	4,348
Cherokee	7,478	66.20%	3,442	30.47%	376	3.33%	0	0.00%	4,036	35.73%	11,296
Cheyenne	1,466	69.61%	586	27.83%	53	2.52%	1	0.05%	880	41.79%	2,106
Clark	1,383	76.41%	419	23.15%	7	0.39%	1	0.06%	964	53.26%	1,810
Clay	4,457	73.74%	1,515	25.07%	72	1.19%	0	0.00%	2,942	48.68%	6,044
Cloud	5,286	68.25%	2,376	30.68%	74	0.96%	9	0.12%	2,910	37.57%	7,745
Coffey	4,342	73.81%	1,514	25.74%	27	0.46%	0	0.00%	2,828	48.07%	5,883
Comanche	1,554	79.98%	385	19.81%	2	0.10%	2	0.10%	1,169	60.16%	1,943
Cowley	12,701	80.79%	2,818	17.93%	190	1.21%	12	0.08%	9,883	62.86%	15,721
Crawford	10,992	62.31%	6,351	36.00%	275	1.56%	24	0.14%	4,641	26.31%	17,642
Decatur	2,314	66.53%	1,129	32.46%	30	0.86%	5	0.14%	1,185	34.07%	3,478
Dickinson	7,758	77.04%	2,246	22.30%	62	0.62%	4	0.04%	5,512	54.74%	10,070
Doniphan	4,002	72.64%	1,496	27.16%	10	0.18%	1	0.02%	2,506	45.49%	5,509
Douglas	8,887	78.70%	2,297	20.34%	104	0.92%	4	0.04%	6,590	58.36%	11,292
Edwards	2,171	73.37%	768	25.95%	19	0.64%	1	0.03%	1,403	47.41%	2,959
Elk	3,007	77.50%	831	21.42%	37	0.95%	5	0.13%	2,176	56.08%	3,880
Ellis	1,700	33.50%	3,364	66.29%	10	0.20%	1	0.02%	-1,664	-32.79%	5,075
Ellsworth	2,450	60.23%	1,588	39.04%	25	0.61%	5	0.12%	862	21.19%	4,068
Finney	2,433	76.65%	709	22.34%	29	0.91%	3	0.09%	1,724	54.32%	3,174
Ford	4,893	71.59%	1,870	27.36%	64	0.94%	8	0.12%	3,023	44.23%	6,835
Franklin	7,346	78.40%	1,951	20.82%	65	0.69%	8	0.09%	5,395	57.58%	9,370
Geary	2,746	69.15%	1,203	30.29%	22	0.55%	0	0.00%	1,543	38.86%	3,971
Gove	1,470	70.95%	590	28.47%	10	0.48%	2	0.10%	880	42.47%	2,072
Graham	1,832	61.68%	1,087	36.60%	51	1.72%	0	0.00%	745	25.08%	2,970
Grant	635	76.41%	185	22.26%	11	1.32%	0	0.00%	450	54.15%	831
Gray	1,294	67.47%	606	31.60%	14	0.73%	4	0.21%	688	35.87%	1,918
Greeley	439	78.25%	121	21.57%	1	0.18%	0	0.00%	318	56.68%	561
Greenwood	5,863	78.53%	1,554	20.81%	49	0.66%	0	0.00%	4,309	57.71%	7,466
Hamilton	839	68.43%	363	29.61%	24	1.96%	0	0.00%	476	38.83%	1,226
Harper	3,712	77.85%	1,005	21.08%	48	1.01%	3	0.06%	2,707	56.77%	4,768
Harvey	6,330	77.62%	1,748	21.43%	77	0.94%	0	0.00%	4,582	56.19%	8,155
Haskell	646	73.41%	222	25.23%	12	1.36%	0	0.00%	424	48.18%	880
Hodgeman	1,122	67.55%	528	31.79%	11	0.66%	0	0.00%	594	35.76%	1,661
Jackson	4,811	74.55%	1,602	24.83%	33	0.51%	7	0.11%	3,209	49.73%	6,453
Jefferson	4,810	74.77%	1,601	24.89%	19	0.30%	3	0.05%	3,209	49.88%	6,433
Jewell	4,583	76.90%	1,289	21.63%	84	1.41%	4	0.07%	3,294	55.27%	5,960
Johnson	8,185	70.40%	3,373	29.01%	64	0.55%	5	0.04%	4,812	41.39%	11,627
Kearny	854	77.22%	229	20.71%	23	2.08%	0	0.00%	625	56.51%	1,106
Kingman	3,287	69.63%	1,408	29.82%	26	0.55%	0	0.00%	1,879	39.80%	4,721
Kiowa	1,929	82.09%	406	17.28%	13	0.55%	2	0.09%	1,523	64.81%	2,350
Labette	9,048	74.22%	2,969	24.35%	160	1.31%	14	0.11%	6,079	49.86%	12,191
Lane	954	71.30%	364	27.20%	20	1.49%	0	0.00%	590	44.10%	1,338
Leavenworth	8,472	56.27%	6,539	43.43%	45	0.30%	0	0.00%	1,933	12.84%	15,056
Lincoln	2,655	73.12%	953	26.25%	21	0.58%	2	0.06%	1,702	46.87%	3,631
Linn	4,231	75.19%	1,328	23.60%	60	1.07%	8	0.14%	2,903	51.59%	5,627
Logan	1,066	71.64%	405	27.22%	13	0.87%	4	0.27%	661	44.42%	1,488
Lyon	8,753	75.49%	2,761	23.81%	78	0.67%	3	0.03%	5,992	51.68%	11,595
Marion	5,446	73.50%	1,938	26.15%	26	0.35%	0	0.00%	3,508	47.34%	7,410
Marshall	6,918	67.06%	3,329	32.27%	69	0.67%	0	0.00%	3,589	34.79%	10,316
McPherson	6,230	79.98%	1,457	18.71%	81	1.04%	21	0.27%	4,773	61.28%	7,789
Meade	1,709	73.16%	618	26.46%	9	0.39%	0	0.00%	1,091	46.70%	2,336
Miami	5,931	72.71%	2,148	26.33%	69	0.85%	9	0.11%	3,783	46.38%	8,157
Mitchell	3,245	62.84%	1,855	35.92%	58	1.12%	6	0.12%	1,390	26.92%	5,164
Montgomery	14,316	76.31%	4,205	22.41%	239	1.27%	0	0.00%	10,111	53.90%	18,760
Morris	3,830	79.54%	929	19.29%	53	1.10%	3	0.06%	2,901	60.25%	4,815
Morton	1,010	78.78%	259	20.20%	10	0.78%	3	0.23%	751	58.58%	1,282
Nemaha	4,639	61.10%	2,919	38.45%	27	0.36%	7	0.09%	1,720	22.66%	7,592
Neosho	6,603	72.27%	2,459	26.92%	60	0.66%	14	0.15%	4,144	45.36%	9,136
Ness	2,058	71.51%	784	27.24%	36	1.25%	0	0.00%	1,274	44.27%	2,878
Norton	3,365	73.99%	1,087	23.90%	96	2.11%	0	0.00%	2,278	50.09%	4,548
Osage	5,900	73.24%	2,058	25.55%	94	1.17%	4	0.05%	3,842	47.69%	8,056
Osborne	3,683	81.34%	821	18.13%	22	0.49%	2	0.04%	2,862	63.21%	4,528
Ottawa	3,158	72.53%	1,131	25.98%	65	1.49%	0	0.00%	2,027	46.55%	4,354
Pawnee	2,829	75.18%	918	24.40%	11	0.29%	5	0.13%	1,911	50.78%	3,763
Phillips	3,206	69.77%	1,332	28.99%	57	1.24%	0	0.00%	1,874	40.78%	4,595
Pottawatomie	4,451	65.30%	2,341	34.35%	24	0.35%	0	0.00%	2,110	30.96%	6,816
Pratt	4,055	80.58%	934	18.56%	43	0.85%	0	0.00%	3,121	62.02%	5,032
Rawlins	1,668	57.78%	1,164	40.32%	52	1.80%	3	0.10%	504	17.46%	2,887
Reno	12,872	76.31%	3,843	22.78%	142	0.84%	11	0.07%	9,029	53.53%	16,868
Republic	4,324	68.19%	1,956	30.85%	57	0.90%	4	0.06%	2,368	37.34%	6,341
Rice	4,321	74.05%	1,462	25.06%	52	0.89%	0	0.00%	2,859	49.00%	5,835
Riley	6,592	77.91%	1,791	21.17%	75	0.89%	3	0.04%	4,801	56.74%	8,461
Rooks	2,583	70.73%	1,044	28.59%	23	0.63%	2	0.05%	1,539	42.14%	3,652
Rush	1,985	60.02%	1,296	39.19%	26	0.79%	0	0.00%	689	20.83%	3,307
Russell	2,782	66.56%	1,366	32.68%	32	0.77%	0	0.00%	1,416	33.88%	4,180
Saline	7,872	71.20%	3,108	28.11%	76	0.69%	0	0.00%	4,764	43.09%	11,056
Scott	886	65.78%	450	33.41%	11	0.82%	0	0.00%	436	32.37%	1,347
Sedgwick	32,132	74.40%	10,649	24.66%	405	0.94%	0	0.00%	21,483	49.75%	43,186
Seward	1,873	76.98%	538	22.11%	22	0.90%	0	0.00%	1,335	54.87%	2,433
Shawnee	24,723	76.46%	7,433	22.99%	165	0.51%	15	0.05%	17,290	53.47%	32,336
Sheridan	1,450	60.52%	930	38.81%	16	0.67%	0	0.00%	520	21.70%	2,396
Sherman	2,028	74.61%	630	23.18%	60	2.21%	0	0.00%	1,398	51.43%	2,718
Smith	4,021	74.34%	1,338	24.74%	50	0.92%	0	0.00%	2,683	49.60%	5,409
Stafford	3,278	75.27%	1,025	23.54%	47	1.08%	5	0.11%	2,253	51.73%	4,355
Stanton	497	74.85%	164	24.70%	3	0.45%	0	0.00%	333	50.15%	664
Stevens	1,133	78.52%	300	20.79%	10	0.69%	0	0.00%	833	57.73%	1,443
Sumner	8,951	79.64%	2,108	18.75%	181	1.61%	0	0.00%	6,843	60.88%	11,240
Thomas	1,828	65.97%	899	32.44%	44	1.59%	0	0.00%	929	33.53%	2,771
Trego	1,359	57.73%	982	41.72%	13	0.55%	0	0.00%	377	16.02%	2,354
Wabaunsee	3,099	71.89%	1,189	27.58%	22	0.51%	1	0.02%	1,910	44.31%	4,311
Wallace	738	66.19%	356	31.93%	21	1.88%	0	0.00%	382	34.26%	1,115
Washington	4,781	67.37%	2,267	31.94%	49	0.69%	0	0.00%	2,514	35.42%	7,097
Wichita	464	54.91%	370	43.79%	11	1.30%	0	0.00%	94	11.12%	845
Wilson	5,603	78.46%	1,465	20.52%	72	1.01%	1	0.01%	4,138	57.95%	7,141
Woodson	2,885	76.59%	855	22.70%	26	0.69%	1	0.03%	2,030	53.89%	3,767
Wyandotte	32,829	65.69%	16,884	33.78%	249	0.50%	16	0.03%	15,945	31.90%	49,978
Totals	513,672	72.02%	193,003	27.06%	6,205	0.87%	320	0.04%	320,669	44.96%	713,200

== See also ==
- United States presidential elections in Kansas
