= Syracuse Township, Kansas =

Syracuse Township
- Township
- Location in Hamilton County
- Coordinates: 37°58′46″N 101°44′02″W
- Country: United States
- State: Kansas
- County: Hamilton

Area
  - Total: 81.09 sq mi (210.01 km^{2})
  - Land: 81 sq mi (210 km^{2})
  - Water: 0.0039 sq mi (0.01 km^{2}) 0%
- Elevation: 3,228 ft (984 m)

Population (2020)
  - Total: 2,084
  - Density: 26/sq mi (9.9/km^{2})
- GNIS feature ID: 0485273

Syracuse Township is a township in Hamilton County, Kansas, United States. As of the 2020 census, its population was 2,084.

== Geography ==
Syracuse Township covers an area of 81.09 square miles (210.0 km^{2}) and contains one incorporated settlement, Syracuse (the county seat). According to the USGS, it contains one cemetery, Syracuse.

The streams of Sand Creek and Syracuse Creek run through this township.

== Transportation ==
Syracuse Township contains one airport or landing strip, Syracuse-Hamilton County Municipal Airport.
