= Bear Creek Township, Kansas =

Bear Creek Township
- Township
- Location in Hamilton County
- Coordinates: 37°49′37″N 101°54′32″W
- Country: United States
- State: Kansas
- County: Hamilton

Area
  - Total: 174.72 sq mi (452.53 km^{2})
  - Land: 174.39 sq mi (451.68 km^{2})
  - Water: 0.32 sq mi (0.84 km^{2}) 0.19%
- Elevation: 3,396 ft (1,035 m)

Population (2020)
  - Total: 66
  - Density: 0.38/sq mi (0.15/km^{2})
- GNIS feature ID: 0471578

Bear Creek Township is a township in Hamilton County, Kansas, United States. As of the 2020 census, its population was 66.

== Geography ==
Bear Creek Township covers an area of 174.72 square miles (452.5 km^{2}) and contains no incorporated settlements. According to the USGS, it contains two cemeteries: Bear Creek and Sunnyvale.

The streams of Dry Creek and North Bear Creek run through this township.
