= Liberty Township, Hamilton County, Kansas =

Liberty Township
- Township
- Location in Hamilton County
- Coordinates: 38°06′37″N 101°42′04″W
- Country: United States
- State: Kansas
- County: Hamilton

Area
  - Total: 99.17 sq mi (256.86 km^{2})
  - Land: 99.14 sq mi (256.78 km^{2})
  - Water: 0.031 sq mi (0.08 km^{2}) 0.03%
- Elevation: 3,514 ft (1,071 m)

Population (2020)
  - Total: 43
  - Density: 0.43/sq mi (0.17/km^{2})
- GNIS feature ID: 0485257

Liberty Township is a township in Hamilton County, Kansas, United States. As of the 2020 census, its population was 43.

== Geography ==
Liberty Township covers an area of 99.18 square miles (256.9 km^{2}) and contains no incorporated settlements.

== Transportation ==
Liberty Township contains one airport or landing strip, Dikeman Airport.
