= Southside Township, Kansas =

Southside Township
- Township
- Location in Kearny County
- Coordinates: 37°52′20″N 101°12′49″W
- Country: United States
- State: Kansas
- County: Kearny

Area
  - Total: 110.30 sq mi (285.68 km^{2})
  - Land: 110.24 sq mi (285.51 km^{2})
  - Water: 0.066 sq mi (0.17 km^{2}) 0.06%
- Elevation: 3,020 ft (920 m)

Population (2020)
  - Total: 261
  - Density: 2.37/sq mi (0.914/km^{2})
- GNIS feature ID: 0471596

Southside Township is a township in Kearny County, Kansas, United States. As of the 2020 census, its population was 261.

== Geography ==
Southside Township covers an area of 110.3 square miles (285.68 square kilometers); of this, 0.07 square miles (0.17 square kilometers) or 0.06 percent is water.

=== Adjacent townships ===
- Deerfield Township (north)
- Sherlock Township, Finney County (northeast)
- Ivanhoe Township, Finney County (east)
- Kendall Township (southwest)
- Hartland Township (northwest)
- Lakin Township (northwest)

=== Major highways ===
- K-25 (Kansas highway)
