= Lamont Township, Kansas =

Lamont Township
- Township
- Location in Hamilton County
- Coordinates: 37°49′37″N 101°39′34″W
- Country: United States
- State: Kansas
- County: Hamilton

Area
  - Total: 164.43 sq mi (425.88 km^{2})
  - Land: 164.4 sq mi (425.8 km^{2})
  - Water: 0.031 sq mi (0.08 km^{2}) 0.02%
- Elevation: 3,428 ft (1,045 m)

Population (2020)
  - Total: 84
  - Density: 0.51/sq mi (0.20/km^{2})
- GNIS feature ID: 0471582

Lamont Township is a township in Hamilton County, Kansas, United States. As of the 2020 census, its population was 84.

== Geography ==
Lamont Township covers an area of 164.43 square miles (425.9 km^{2}) and contains no incorporated settlements. According to the USGS, it contains one cemetery: Menno.
