= Coolidge Township, Kansas =

Coolidge Township
- Township
- Location in Hamilton County
- Coordinates: 38°02′40″N 101°59′02″W
- Country: United States
- State: Kansas
- County: Hamilton

Area
  - Total: 115.2 sq mi (298.4 km^{2})
  - Land: 114.78 sq mi (297.29 km^{2})
  - Water: 0.43 sq mi (1.11 km^{2}) 0.37%
- Elevation: 3,369 ft (1,027 m)

Population (2020)
  - Total: 101
  - Density: 0.880/sq mi (0.340/km^{2})
- GNIS feature ID: 0485270

Coolidge Township is a township in Hamilton County, Kansas, United States. As of the 2020 census, its population was 101.

== Geography ==
Coolidge Township covers an area of 115.21 square miles (298.4 km^{2}) and contains one incorporated settlement, Coolidge. According to the USGS, it contains one cemetery, Coolidge.

The streams of Bridge Creek, Cheyenne Creek, Spring Creek and West Bridge Creek run through this township.
