= Richland Township, Hamilton County, Kansas =

Richland Township
- Township
- Location in Hamilton County
- Coordinates: 38°13′08″N 101°47′57″W
- Country: United States
- State: Kansas
- County: Hamilton

Area
  - Total: 164.4 sq mi (425.8 km^{2})
  - Land: 164.4 sq mi (425.8 km^{2})
  - Water: 0 sq mi (0 km^{2}) 0%
- Elevation: 3,625 ft (1,105 m)

Population (2020)
  - Total: 30
  - Density: 0.18/sq mi (0.070/km^{2})
- GNIS feature ID: 0485245

Richland Township is a township in Hamilton County, Kansas, United States. As of the 2020 census, its population was 30.

== Geography ==
Richland Township covers an area of 164.4 square miles (426 km^{2}) and contains no incorporated settlements.
