= Kendall Township, Hamilton County, Kansas =

Kendall Township
- Township
- Location in Hamilton County
- Coordinates: 38°02′44″N 101°35′49″W
- Country: United States
- State: Kansas
- County: Hamilton

Area
  - Total: 90.42 sq mi (234.19 km^{2})
  - Land: 90.42 sq mi (234.19 km^{2})
  - Water: 0 sq mi (0 km^{2}) 0%
- Elevation: 3,366 ft (1,026 m)

Population (2020)
  - Total: 70
  - Density: 0.77/sq mi (0.30/km^{2})
- GNIS feature ID: 0485276

Kendall Township is a township in Hamilton County, Kansas, United States. As of the 2020 census, its population was 70.

== Geography ==
Kendall Township covers an area of 90.42 square miles (234.2 km^{2}) and contains no incorporated settlements. According to the USGS, it contains one cemetery, Kendall.
