= Elections in Kansas =

The number of elections in Kansas varies by year. Kansas has a gubernatorial election every four years. Members of the state's United States congressional delegation run for election or re-election at the times set out in the United States Constitution. Primary elections assist in choosing political parties' nominees for various positions. On a regional basis, elections also cover municipal issues. In addition, a special election can occur at any time.

In a 2020 study, Kansas was ranked as the 13th hardest state for citizens to vote in.

United States presidential election results for Kansas
Year	Republican		Democratic		Third party(ies)	
Year	No.	%	No.	%	No.	%
1864	17,089	79.19%	3,836	17.78%	655	3.04%
1868	30,027	68.82%	13,600	31.17%	3	0.01%
1872	66,805	66.46%	32,970	32.80%	737	0.73%
1876	78,324	63.10%	37,902	30.53%	7,908	6.37%
1880	121,549	60.40%	59,801	29.72%	19,886	9.88%
1884	154,406	58.08%	90,132	33.90%	21,310	8.02%
1888	182,904	55.23%	102,745	31.03%	45,500	13.74%
1892	157,241	48.40%	0	0.00%	167,664	51.60%
1896	159,345	47.63%	171,675	51.32%	3,527	1.05%
1900	185,955	52.56%	162,601	45.96%	5,210	1.47%
1904	212,955	64.81%	86,174	26.23%	29,432	8.96%
1908	197,216	52.46%	161,209	42.88%	17,521	4.66%
1912	74,845	20.47%	143,663	39.30%	147,052	40.23%
1916	277,658	44.09%	314,588	49.95%	37,567	5.96%
1920	369,268	64.75%	185,464	32.52%	15,586	2.73%
1924	407,671	61.54%	156,319	23.60%	98,464	14.86%
1928	513,672	72.02%	193,003	27.06%	6,525	0.91%
1932	349,498	44.13%	424,204	53.56%	18,276	2.31%
1936	397,727	45.95%	464,520	53.67%	3,267	0.38%
1940	489,169	56.86%	364,725	42.40%	6,403	0.74%
1944	442,096	60.25%	287,458	39.18%	4,222	0.58%
1948	423,039	53.63%	351,902	44.61%	13,878	1.76%
1952	616,302	68.77%	273,296	30.50%	6,568	0.73%
1956	566,878	65.44%	296,317	34.21%	3,048	0.35%
1960	561,474	60.45%	363,213	39.10%	4,138	0.45%
1964	386,579	45.06%	464,028	54.09%	7,294	0.85%
1968	478,674	54.84%	302,996	34.72%	91,113	10.44%
1972	619,812	67.66%	270,287	29.50%	25,996	2.84%
1976	502,752	52.49%	430,421	44.94%	24,672	2.58%
1980	566,812	57.85%	326,150	33.29%	86,833	8.86%
1984	677,296	66.27%	333,149	32.60%	11,546	1.13%
1988	554,049	55.79%	422,636	42.56%	16,359	1.65%
1992	449,951	38.88%	390,434	33.74%	316,851	27.38%
1996	583,245	54.29%	387,659	36.08%	103,396	9.62%
2000	622,332	58.04%	399,276	37.24%	50,608	4.72%
2004	736,456	62.00%	434,993	36.62%	16,307	1.37%
2008	699,655	56.48%	514,765	41.55%	24,453	1.97%
2012	689,809	59.59%	439,908	38.00%	27,815	2.40%
2016	671,018	56.03%	427,005	35.66%	99,547	8.31%
2020	771,406	56.00%	570,323	41.40%	35,755	2.60%
2024	758,802	57.16%	544,853	41.04%	23,936	1.80%

== Voter qualifications ==
Subject to such exceptions as the Kansas Legislature may prescribe, all citizens of the United States, over the age of eighteen and who are residents of this state, may register to vote as a qualified elector of Kansas. A special provision allows seventeen-year-olds to register to vote if they will be eighteen before the next statewide general election. This does not allow them to vote in the primary or at any other election before attaining the age of eighteen.

== Types of elections ==
=== General election ===
The general election for all elected state, district and country officers is held on the first Tuesday after the first Monday of November every two years. Those offices whose term expires the year following the general election must face election in that general election. For the statewide elected executive offices (the Governor of Kansas, Attorney General of Kansas, etc.), they must face election in the general election held two years after the last election for President of the United States. The most recent gubernatorial election in Kansas was held in 2022.

Candidates for United States Senator and United States Representative are elected in either the state general election as their term expires.

=== Primary election ===
A primary election must be held for a political party to nominate its candidates for the offices to the filled at the next general election. Such primaries are held on the first Tuesday in August of each year in which a general election is to be held. No candidate's name may be printed on the general election ballot unless such candidate has been nominated by his political party by a primary election. However, nonpartisan candidates need not seek primary election nominations in order to appear on the general election ballot.

Kansas operates a closed primary system in which only voters who have affiliated with the given political party may vote in that party's primary and runoff primary elections. However, the chairman of each political party may allow registered Independents to vote in the given political party. However, under no circumstance may an Independent vote in more than one political party's primary elections.

Registered voters not affiliated with either party 21 days before the election may choose to affiliate with a party on election day at the polling place.

== Election provisions ==
=== Substitute candidates ===
In the event of the death of a political party's nominee for office prior to the date of the general election, a substitute candidate is permitted to have his name placed on the general election ballot. If the nominee was a candidate for a state office, the state central committee of the party affected must the Secretary of the State Election Board of the name of an alternative candidate to be placed on the general election ballot. Such notice must be submitted in writing within five days after the death has occurred and must be signed by at least two members of the political party's state central committee.

If the death of the political party's nominee should occur five days or more following the Runoff Primary Election date, a special general election shall be called by the Governor of Kansas. For such special general election, the candidates for office are the substitute candidate named by the central committee, the nominee of other political parties nominated for office, and any previously filed independent candidates.

== Political parties ==
- Green Party of Kansas
- Kansas Constitution Party
- Kansas Democratic Party
- Kansas Republican Party
- Libertarian Party of Kansas
- Natural Law Party of Kansas
- Reform Party of Kansas

== See also ==
- 2026 Kansas elections
- United States presidential elections in Kansas
