= United States presidential elections in Kansas =

Presidential elections in Kansas
- Number of elections: 41
- Voted Democratic: 6
- Voted Republican: 34
- Voted other: 1 (Note: James B. Weaver, 1892.)
- Voted for winning candidate: 28
- Voted for losing candidate: 13

Following is a table of United States presidential elections in Kansas, ordered by year. Since its admission to statehood in 1861, Kansas has participated in every U.S. presidential election. As of 2024, Kansas has the longest streak of being decided by more than a 5% margin in presidential elections, with the last race this close being in 1896.

Winners of the state are in bold. The shading refers to the state winner, and not the national winner.

View source data.

Year	Winner (nationally)	Votes	Percent	Runner-up (nationally)	Votes	Percent	Other national candidates (Note: For purposes of these lists, other national candidates are defined as those who won at least one electoral vote, or won at least ten percent of the vote in multiple states.)	Votes	Percent	Electoral votes	Notes
2024	**Donald Trump**	758,802	57.16	Kamala Harris	544,853	41.04	—			6	
2020	Joe Biden	570,323	41.51	**Donald Trump**	771,406	56.14	—			6	
2016	**Donald Trump** (Note: Won the electoral college while losing the popular vote)	671,018	56.16	Hillary Clinton	427,005	35.74	—			6	
2012	Barack Obama	440,726	37.99	**Mitt Romney**	692,634	59.71	—			6	
2008	Barack Obama	514,765	41.55	**John McCain**	699,655	56.61	—			6	
2004	**George W. Bush**	736,456	62.00	John Kerry	434,993	36.62	—			6	
2000	**George W. Bush**	622,332	58.04	Al Gore	399,276	37.24	—			6	
1996	Bill Clinton	387,659	36.08	**Bob Dole**	583,245	54.29	Ross Perot	92,639	8.62	6	
1992	Bill Clinton	390,434	33.74	**George H. W. Bush**	449,951	38.88	Ross Perot	312,358	26.99	6	
1988	**George H. W. Bush**	554,049	55.79	Michael Dukakis	422,636	42.56	—			7	
1984	**Ronald Reagan**	677,296	66.27	Walter Mondale	333,149	32.60	—			7	
1980	**Ronald Reagan**	566,812	57.85	Jimmy Carter	326,150	33.29	John B. Anderson	68,231	6.96	7	
1976	Jimmy Carter	430,421	44.94	**Gerald Ford**	502,752	52.49	—			7	
1972	**Richard Nixon**	619,812	67.66	George McGovern	270,287	29.50	—			7	
1968	**Richard Nixon**	478,674	54.84	Hubert Humphrey	302,996	34.72	George Wallace	88,921	10.19	7	
1964	**Lyndon B. Johnson**	464,028	54.09	Barry Goldwater	386,579	45.06	—			7	
1960	John F. Kennedy	363,213	39.10	**Richard Nixon**	561,474	60.45	—			8	
1956	**Dwight D. Eisenhower**	566,878	65.44	Adlai Stevenson II	296,317	34.21	T. Coleman Andrews/ Unpledged Electors (Note: Was allied with a slate of unpledged electors in Louisiana, Mississippi and South Carolina)	—	—	8	
1952	**Dwight D. Eisenhower**	616,302	68.77	Adlai Stevenson II	273,296	30.50	-			8	
1948	Harry S. Truman	351,902	44.61	**Thomas E. Dewey**	423,039	53.63	Strom Thurmond	—	—	8	
1944	Franklin D. Roosevelt	287,458	39.18	**Thomas E. Dewey**	442,096	60.25	—			8	
1940	Franklin D. Roosevelt	364,725	42.40	**Wendell Willkie**	489,169	56.86	—			9	
1936	**Franklin D. Roosevelt**	464,520	53.67	Alf Landon	397,727	45.95	—			9	
1932	**Franklin D. Roosevelt**	424,204	53.56	Herbert Hoover	349,498	44.13	—			9	
1928	**Herbert Hoover**	513,672	72.02	Al Smith	193,003	27.06	—			10	
1924	**Calvin Coolidge**	407,671	61.54	John W. Davis	156,319	23.60	Robert M. La Follette	98,461	14.86	10	
1920	**Warren G. Harding**	369,268	64.75	James M. Cox	185,464	32.52	Parley P. Christensen	—	—	10	
1916	**Woodrow Wilson**	314,588	49.95	Charles E. Hughes	277,658	44.09	—			10	
1912	**Woodrow Wilson**	143,663	39.30	Theodore Roosevelt	120,210	32.88	William H. Taft	74,845	20.47	10	
1908	**William H. Taft**	197,216	52.46	William Jennings Bryan	161,209	42.88	—			10	
1904	**Theodore Roosevelt**	212,955	64.81	Alton B. Parker	86,174	26.23	—			10	
1900	**William McKinley**	185,955	52.56	William Jennings Bryan	162,601	45.96	—			10	
1896	William McKinley	159,345	47.63	**William Jennings Bryan**	171,675	51.32	—			10	
1892	Grover Cleveland	no ballots		Benjamin Harrison	157,241	48.40	**James B. Weaver**	163,111	50.20	10	
1888	**Benjamin Harrison**	182,904	55.23	Grover Cleveland	102,745	31.03	—			9	
1884	Grover Cleveland	90,132	33.90	**James G. Blaine**	154,406	58.08	—			9	
1880	**James A. Garfield**	121,549	60.40	Winfield S. Hancock	59,801	29.72	James B. Weaver	19,851	9.86	5	
1876	**Rutherford B. Hayes**	78,324	63.10	Samuel J. Tilden	37,902	30.53	—			5	
1872	**Ulysses S. Grant**	66,805	66.46	Horace Greeley	32,970	32.80	—			5	
1868	**Ulysses S. Grant**	30,027	68.8	Horatio Seymour	13,600	31.2	—			3	
1864	**Abraham Lincoln**	17,089	81.7	George B. McClellan	3,836	18.3	—			3	

== See also ==
- Elections in Kansas
