= 1940 United States presidential election in Kansas =

- November 5, 1940

All 9 Kansas votes to the Electoral College

Nominee	Wendell Willkie	Franklin D. Roosevelt
Party	Republican	Democratic
Home state	New York	New York
Running mate	Charles L. McNary	Henry A. Wallace
Electoral vote	9	0
Popular vote	489,169	364,725
Percentage	56.86%	42.40%
County results
Willkie
40–50%
50–60%
60–70%
70–80%
Roosevelt
40–50%
50–60%
President before election
Franklin D. Roosevelt
Democratic
Elected President
Franklin D. Roosevelt
Democratic

The 1940 United States presidential election in Kansas took place on November 5, 1940, as part of the 1940 United States presidential election. Voters chose nine representatives, or electors, to the Electoral College, who voted for president and vice president.

Kansas was won by Wendell Willkie (R–New York), running with Minority Leader Charles L. McNary, with 56.86 percent of the popular vote, against incumbent President Franklin D. Roosevelt (D–New York), running with Secretary Henry A. Wallace, with 42.40 percent of the popular vote. This was the first time since 1896 that Kansas voted for a losing candidate, and the first time since 1884 that the state backed a losing Republican in a presidential election.

With 56.86 percent of the popular vote, Kansas would prove to be Willkie's third strongest state in the 1940 election in terms of popular vote percentage after South Dakota and neighboring Nebraska.

== Results ==
1940 United States presidential election in Kansas
Party	Candidate	Votes	%
Republican	Wendell Willkie	489,169	56.86%
Democratic	Franklin D. Roosevelt (inc.)	364,725	42.40%
Prohibition	Roger Babson	4,056	0.47%
Socialist	Norman Thomas	2,347	0.27%
Total votes		860,297	100%

=== Results by county ===
1940 United States presidential election in Kansas by county
County	Wendell Lewis Willkie Republican		Franklin Delano Roosevelt Democratic		Roger Ward Babson Prohibition		Norman Mattoon Thomas Socialist		Margin		Total votes cast
County	#	%	#	%	#	%	#	%	#	%	Total votes cast
Allen	6,376	66.42%	3,178	33.10%	34	0.35%	12	0.13%	3,198	33.31%	9,600
Anderson	3,886	64.41%	2,114	35.04%	21	0.35%	12	0.20%	1,772	29.37%	6,033
Atchison	5,921	56.07%	4,557	43.15%	55	0.52%	27	0.26%	1,364	12.92%	10,560
Barber	2,389	52.84%	2,074	45.87%	41	0.91%	17	0.38%	315	6.97%	4,521
Barton	6,011	54.43%	4,982	45.11%	36	0.33%	14	0.13%	1,029	9.32%	11,043
Bourbon	5,751	53.61%	4,898	45.66%	64	0.60%	14	0.13%	853	7.95%	10,727
Brown	6,008	69.18%	2,633	30.32%	34	0.39%	9	0.10%	3,375	38.86%	8,684
Butler	7,619	49.60%	7,615	49.58%	108	0.70%	18	0.12%	4	0.03%	15,360
Chase	1,871	57.78%	1,344	41.51%	15	0.46%	8	0.25%	527	16.28%	3,238
Chautauqua	2,888	62.70%	1,679	36.45%	30	0.65%	9	0.20%	1,209	26.25%	4,606
Cherokee	6,600	49.27%	6,670	49.79%	61	0.46%	65	0.49%	-70	-0.52%	13,396
Cheyenne	1,760	64.14%	971	35.39%	8	0.29%	5	0.18%	789	28.75%	2,744
Clark	1,072	49.47%	1,079	49.79%	13	0.60%	3	0.14%	-7	-0.32%	2,167
Clay	4,699	68.74%	2,067	30.24%	46	0.67%	24	0.35%	2,632	38.50%	6,836
Cloud	5,275	60.44%	3,327	38.12%	99	1.13%	27	0.31%	1,948	22.32%	8,728
Coffey	4,164	64.26%	2,272	35.06%	32	0.49%	12	0.19%	1,892	29.20%	6,480
Comanche	1,322	59.50%	880	39.60%	14	0.63%	6	0.27%	442	19.89%	2,222
Cowley	9,684	53.99%	8,115	45.25%	100	0.56%	36	0.20%	1,569	8.75%	17,935
Crawford	10,143	47.68%	11,002	51.71%	64	0.30%	66	0.31%	-859	-4.04%	21,275
Decatur	2,018	56.16%	1,546	43.03%	16	0.45%	13	0.36%	472	13.14%	3,593
Dickinson	6,931	63.25%	3,957	36.11%	39	0.36%	31	0.28%	2,974	27.14%	10,958
Doniphan	4,204	67.70%	1,986	31.98%	9	0.14%	11	0.18%	2,218	35.72%	6,210
Douglas	9,146	70.28%	3,727	28.64%	47	0.36%	94	0.72%	5,419	41.64%	13,014
Edwards	1,886	60.14%	1,219	38.87%	26	0.83%	5	0.16%	667	21.27%	3,136
Elk	2,774	64.77%	1,478	34.51%	15	0.35%	16	0.37%	1,296	30.26%	4,283
Ellis	3,622	52.15%	3,299	47.49%	10	0.14%	15	0.22%	323	4.65%	6,946
Ellsworth	2,658	54.13%	2,237	45.56%	5	0.10%	10	0.20%	421	8.57%	4,910
Finney	2,349	53.39%	2,027	46.07%	14	0.32%	10	0.23%	322	7.32%	4,400
Ford	4,356	51.97%	3,954	47.17%	52	0.62%	20	0.24%	402	4.80%	8,382
Franklin	6,393	63.80%	3,542	35.35%	46	0.46%	39	0.39%	2,851	28.45%	10,020
Geary	2,840	52.65%	2,504	46.42%	24	0.44%	26	0.48%	336	6.23%	5,394
Gove	1,352	66.31%	659	32.32%	7	0.34%	21	1.03%	693	33.99%	2,039
Graham	1,804	60.97%	1,135	38.36%	9	0.30%	11	0.37%	669	22.61%	2,959
Grant	614	61.03%	382	37.97%	7	0.70%	3	0.30%	232	23.06%	1,006
Gray	1,056	51.87%	962	47.25%	13	0.64%	5	0.25%	94	4.62%	2,036
Greeley	497	64.55%	268	34.81%	2	0.26%	3	0.39%	229	29.74%	770
Greenwood	4,893	60.34%	3,160	38.97%	37	0.46%	19	0.23%	1,733	21.37%	8,109
Hamilton	798	57.95%	569	41.32%	6	0.44%	4	0.29%	229	16.63%	1,377
Harper	3,205	55.73%	2,478	43.09%	45	0.78%	23	0.40%	727	12.64%	5,751
Harvey	5,539	56.76%	4,087	41.88%	65	0.67%	68	0.70%	1,452	14.88%	9,759
Haskell	607	58.48%	425	40.94%	4	0.39%	2	0.19%	182	17.53%	1,038
Hodgeman	1,092	60.87%	690	38.46%	6	0.33%	6	0.33%	402	22.41%	1,794
Jackson	4,306	63.92%	2,397	35.58%	23	0.34%	11	0.16%	1,909	28.34%	6,737
Jefferson	4,330	65.81%	2,212	33.62%	14	0.21%	24	0.36%	2,118	32.19%	6,580
Jewell	4,591	71.57%	1,719	26.80%	69	1.08%	36	0.56%	2,872	44.77%	6,415
Johnson	10,326	63.97%	5,770	35.75%	30	0.19%	16	0.10%	4,556	28.22%	16,142
Kearny	721	58.00%	519	41.75%	3	0.24%	0	0.00%	202	16.25%	1,243
Kingman	3,068	54.35%	2,528	44.78%	38	0.67%	11	0.19%	540	9.57%	5,645
Kiowa	1,571	64.10%	844	34.43%	30	1.22%	6	0.24%	727	29.66%	2,451
Labette	8,210	54.17%	6,860	45.26%	58	0.38%	29	0.19%	1,350	8.91%	15,157
Lane	888	60.78%	557	38.12%	7	0.48%	9	0.62%	331	22.66%	1,461
Leavenworth	8,503	58.25%	6,053	41.46%	18	0.13%	24	0.17%	2,450	16.78%	14,598
Lincoln	2,822	67.69%	1,301	31.21%	31	0.74%	15	0.36%	1,521	36.48%	4,169
Linn	4,086	66.04%	2,067	33.41%	17	0.27%	17	0.27%	2,019	32.63%	6,187
Logan	1,201	66.83%	584	32.50%	6	0.33%	6	0.33%	617	34.34%	1,797
Lyon	6,918	52.33%	6,170	46.68%	90	0.68%	41	0.31%	748	5.66%	13,219
Marion	5,764	67.44%	2,724	31.87%	26	0.30%	33	0.39%	3,040	35.57%	8,547
Marshall	7,286	66.65%	3,588	32.82%	17	0.16%	40	0.37%	3,698	33.83%	10,931
McPherson	6,732	60.24%	4,240	37.94%	136	1.22%	68	0.61%	2,492	22.30%	11,176
Meade	1,618	61.13%	970	36.65%	53	2.00%	6	0.23%	648	24.48%	2,647
Miami	5,178	56.77%	3,900	42.76%	18	0.20%	25	0.27%	1,278	14.01%	9,121
Mitchell	3,681	63.55%	2,060	35.57%	32	0.55%	19	0.33%	1,621	27.99%	5,792
Montgomery	13,781	57.68%	9,999	41.85%	68	0.28%	46	0.19%	3,782	15.83%	23,894
Morris	3,276	61.64%	1,992	37.48%	21	0.40%	26	0.49%	1,284	24.16%	5,315
Morton	643	55.72%	503	43.59%	5	0.43%	3	0.26%	140	12.13%	1,154
Nemaha	5,178	65.64%	2,679	33.96%	13	0.16%	19	0.24%	2,499	31.68%	7,889
Neosho	6,556	59.43%	4,419	40.06%	29	0.26%	27	0.24%	2,137	19.37%	11,031
Ness	1,826	58.68%	1,230	39.52%	37	1.19%	19	0.61%	596	19.15%	3,112
Norton	3,415	70.28%	1,378	28.36%	33	0.68%	33	0.68%	2,037	41.92%	4,859
Osage	4,991	60.52%	3,186	38.63%	44	0.53%	26	0.32%	1,805	21.89%	8,247
Osborne	3,424	68.55%	1,488	29.79%	62	1.24%	21	0.42%	1,936	38.76%	4,995
Ottawa	2,810	57.06%	2,065	41.93%	29	0.59%	21	0.43%	745	15.13%	4,925
Pawnee	2,329	50.77%	2,216	48.31%	22	0.48%	20	0.44%	113	2.46%	4,587
Phillips	3,676	69.49%	1,563	29.55%	40	0.76%	11	0.21%	2,113	39.94%	5,290
Pottawatomie	5,045	69.12%	2,226	30.50%	15	0.21%	13	0.18%	2,819	38.62%	7,299
Pratt	2,930	49.94%	2,870	48.92%	45	0.77%	22	0.37%	60	1.02%	5,867
Rawlins	1,758	58.02%	1,247	41.16%	15	0.50%	10	0.33%	511	16.86%	3,030
Reno	12,448	53.64%	10,543	45.43%	138	0.59%	79	0.34%	1,905	8.21%	23,208
Republic	4,450	63.54%	2,511	35.86%	25	0.36%	17	0.24%	1,939	27.69%	7,003
Rice	4,792	56.49%	3,635	42.85%	39	0.46%	17	0.20%	1,157	13.64%	8,483
Riley	7,420	68.59%	3,293	30.44%	45	0.39%	60	0.52%	4,127	38.15%	10,818
Rooks	2,590	60.61%	1,650	38.61%	23	0.54%	10	0.23%	940	22.00%	4,273
Rush	2,394	59.84%	1,588	39.69%	10	0.25%	9	0.22%	806	20.14%	4,001
Russell	3,714	58.56%	2,579	40.67%	40	0.63%	9	0.14%	1,135	17.90%	6,342
Saline	7,975	54.69%	6,514	44.67%	57	0.39%	35	0.24%	1,461	10.02%	14,581
Scott	988	57.24%	717	41.54%	15	0.87%	6	0.35%	271	15.70%	1,726
Sedgwick	32,160	48.05%	34,219	51.13%	394	0.59%	153	0.23%	-2,059	-3.08%	66,926
Seward	1,503	49.65%	1,474	48.70%	44	1.45%	6	0.20%	29	0.96%	3,027
Shawnee	23,882	54.96%	19,375	44.59%	113	0.26%	84	0.19%	4,507	10.37%	43,454
Sheridan	1,492	62.06%	903	37.56%	5	0.21%	4	0.17%	589	24.50%	2,404
Sherman	1,569	52.16%	1,399	46.51%	17	0.57%	23	0.76%	170	5.65%	3,008
Smith	3,630	65.58%	1,855	33.51%	42	0.76%	8	0.14%	1,775	32.07%	5,535
Stafford	2,795	52.17%	2,509	46.84%	38	0.71%	15	0.28%	286	5.34%	5,357
Stanton	378	54.62%	301	43.50%	13	1.88%	0	0.00%	77	11.13%	692
Stevens	851	55.05%	674	43.60%	19	1.23%	2	0.13%	177	11.45%	1,546
Sumner	6,585	51.86%	5,988	47.16%	94	0.74%	31	0.24%	597	4.70%	12,698
Thomas	1,721	54.20%	1,423	44.82%	17	0.54%	14	0.44%	298	9.39%	3,175
Trego	1,571	57.59%	1,140	41.79%	10	0.37%	7	0.26%	431	15.80%	2,728
Wabaunsee	3,481	73.64%	1,212	25.64%	16	0.34%	18	0.38%	2,269	48.00%	4,727
Wallace	756	67.08%	361	32.03%	6	0.53%	4	0.35%	395	35.05%	1,127
Washington	5,792	73.29%	2,061	26.08%	31	0.39%	19	0.24%	3,731	47.21%	7,903
Wichita	644	59.08%	433	39.72%	8	0.73%	5	0.46%	211	19.36%	1,090
Wilson	5,288	64.42%	2,859	34.83%	50	0.61%	12	0.15%	2,429	29.59%	8,209
Woodson	2,637	64.87%	1,398	34.39%	19	0.47%	11	0.27%	1,239	30.48%	4,065
Wyandotte	28,152	42.24%	38,239	57.38%	158	0.24%	94	0.14%	-10,087	-15.14%	66,643
Totals	489,169	56.86%	364,725	42.40%	4,056	0.47%	2,347	0.27%	124,444	14.47%	860,297

==== Counties that flipped from Democratic to Republican ====
- Atchison
- Barton
- Barber
- Bourbon
- Butler
- Chase
- Cheyenne
- Cloud
- Cowley
- Comanche
- Decatur
- Edwards
- Ellis
- Ellsworth
- Ford
- Finney
- Geary
- Grant
- Gray
- Graham
- Greenwood
- Harper
- Hamilton
- Haskell
- Harvey
- Hodgeman
- Kearny
- Kingman
- Kiowa
- Labette
- Lane
- Lincoln
- Lyon
- Marion
- McPherson
- Meade
- Mitchell
- Morris
- Morton
- Nemaha
- Ness
- Ottawa
- Pawnee
- Pratt
- Rawlins
- Rice
- Reno
- Rooks
- Rush
- Russell
- Saline
- Scott
- Seward
- Shawnee
- Sherman
- Sheridan
- Stafford
- Stanton
- Stevens
- Thomas
- Wichita
- Trego
- Sumner

== See also ==
- United States presidential elections in Kansas
