= 1876 United States presidential election in Kansas =

- November 7, 1876
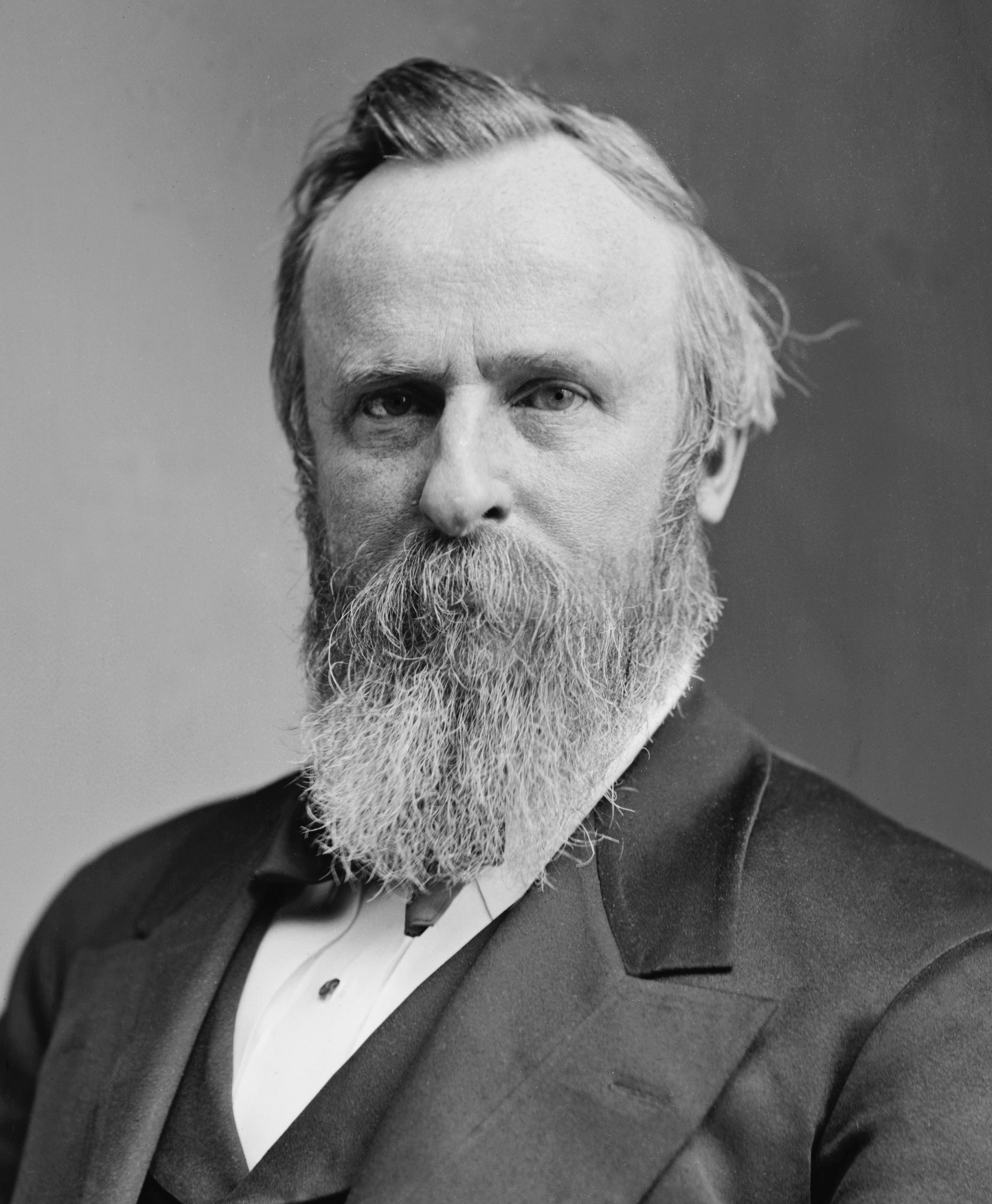

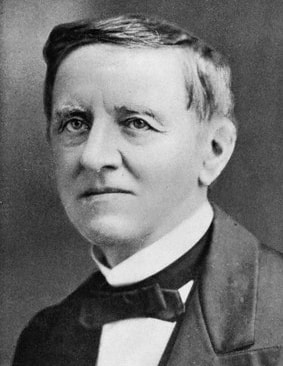

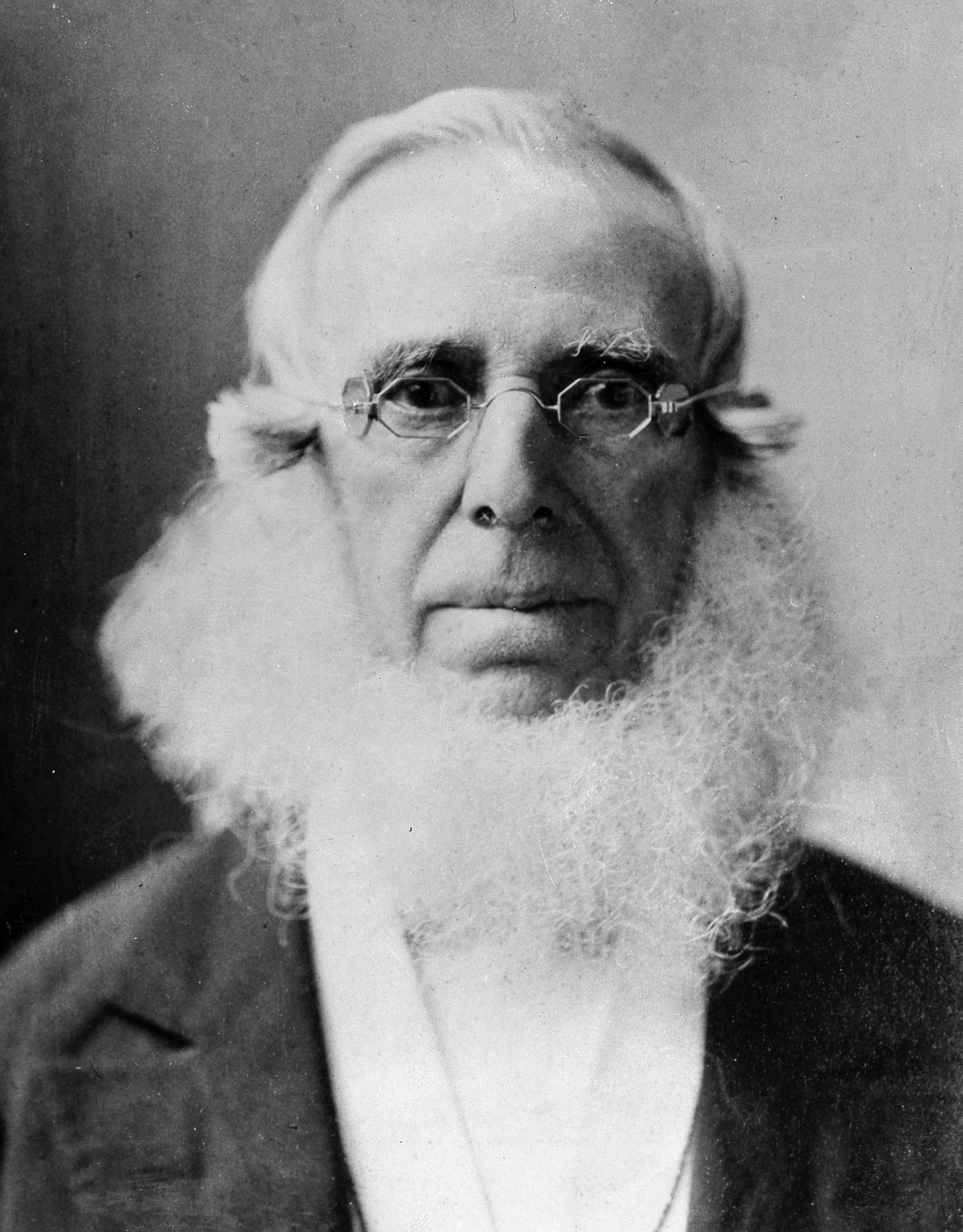
Nominee	Rutherford B. Hayes	Samuel J. Tilden	Peter Cooper
Party	Republican	Democratic	Greenback
Home state	Ohio	New York	New York
Running mate	William A. Wheeler	Thomas A. Hendricks	Samuel Fenton Cary
Electoral vote	5	0	0
Popular vote	78,324	37,902	7,770
Percentage	63.10%	30.53%	6.26%
County results
Hayes
40–50%
50–60%
60–70%
70–80%
80–90%
90–100%
Tilden
50–60%
President before election
Ulysses S. Grant
Republican
Elected President
Rutherford B. Hayes
Republican

The 1876 United States presidential election in Kansas took place on November 7, 1876, as part of the 1876 United States presidential election. Voters chose five representatives, or electors to the Electoral College, who voted for president and vice president.

Kansas voted for the Republican nominee, Rutherford B. Hayes, over the Democratic nominee, Samuel J. Tilden. Hayes won the state by a margin of 32.57%.

With 63.10% of the popular vote, Kansas would be Hayes' third strongest victory in terms of percentage in the popular vote after Vermont and Nebraska. With 6.26% of the popular vote, the state would also prove to be Greenback candidate Peter Cooper's best performing state.

== Results ==
1876 United States presidential election in Kansas
Party	Candidate	Running mate	Popular vote		Electoral vote	
Party	Candidate	Running mate	Count	%	Count	%
Republican	Rutherford B. Hayes of Ohio	William A. Wheeler of New York	78,324	63.10%	5	100.00%
Democratic	Samuel J. Tilden of New York	Thomas A. Hendricks of Indiana	37,902	30.53%	0	0.00%
Greenback	Peter Cooper of New York	Samuel Fenton Cary of Ohio	7,770	6.26%	0	0.00%
Prohibition	Green Clay Smith of Kentucky	Gideon Tabor Stewart of Ohio	110	0.09%	0	0.00%
Anti-Masonic	James Walker of Illinois	Donald Kirkpatrick of Kansas	23	0.02%	0	0.00%
N/A	Others	Others	5	<0.01%	0	0.00%
Total			124,134	100.00%	5	100.00%

== See also ==
- United States presidential elections in Kansas
