= 1944 United States presidential election in Kansas =

- November 7, 1944

All 8 Kansas votes to the Electoral College

Nominee	Thomas E. Dewey	Franklin D. Roosevelt
Party	Republican	Democratic
Home state	New York	New York
Running mate	John W. Bricker	Harry S. Truman
Electoral vote	8	0
Popular vote	442,096	287,458
Percentage	60.25%	39.18%
County results
Dewey
50–60%
60–70%
70–80%
Roosevelt
50–60%
President before election
Franklin D. Roosevelt
Democratic
Elected President
Franklin D. Roosevelt
Democratic

The 1944 United States presidential election in Kansas took place on November 7, 1944, as part of the 1944 United States presidential election. Voters chose eight representatives, or electors, to the Electoral College, who voted for president and vice president.

Kansas was won by Governor Thomas E. Dewey (R–New York), running with Governor John Bricker, with 60.25 percent of the popular vote, against incumbent President Franklin D. Roosevelt (D–New York), running with Senator Harry S. Truman, with 39.18 percent of the popular vote. Dewey's margin was the largest against Roosevelt in any state in any of the four elections that he contested, despite carrying the state by comfortable margins in both 1932 and 1936. The 104 counties (all except Wyandotte) that Roosevelt lost is the most he lost in any state during his four elections to the White House.

== Results ==
1944 United States presidential election in Kansas
Party	Candidate	Votes	%
Republican	Thomas E. Dewey	442,096	60.25%
Democratic	Franklin D. Roosevelt (inc.)	287,458	39.18%
Prohibition	Claude A. Watson	2,609	0.36%
Socialist	Norman Thomas	1,613	0.22%
Total votes		733,776	100%

=== Results by county ===
1944 United States presidential election in Kansas by county
County	Thomas Edmund Dewey Republican		Franklin Delano Roosevelt Democratic		Claude A. Watson Prohibition		Norman Mattoon Thomas Socialist		Margin		Total votes cast
County	#	%	#	%	#	%	#	%	#	%	Total votes cast
Allen	5,032	68.56%	2,262	30.82%	35	0.48%	11	0.15%	2,770	37.74%	7,340
Anderson	3,060	64.89%	1,649	34.97%	3	0.06%	4	0.08%	1,411	29.92%	4,716
Atchison	4,731	58.58%	3,325	41.17%	4	0.05%	16	0.20%	1,406	17.41%	8,076
Barber	2,140	58.28%	1,501	40.88%	18	0.49%	13	0.35%	639	17.40%	3,672
Barton	5,547	59.36%	3,761	40.25%	20	0.21%	17	0.18%	1,786	19.11%	9,345
Bourbon	4,790	56.68%	3,622	42.86%	30	0.35%	9	0.11%	1,168	13.82%	8,451
Brown	4,947	72.98%	1,817	26.80%	11	0.16%	4	0.06%	3,130	46.17%	6,779
Butler	7,064	53.50%	6,084	46.08%	39	0.30%	16	0.12%	980	7.42%	13,203
Chase	1,510	59.99%	998	39.65%	5	0.20%	4	0.16%	512	20.34%	2,517
Chautauqua	2,305	67.38%	1,106	32.33%	6	0.18%	4	0.12%	1,199	35.05%	3,421
Cherokee	5,458	54.65%	4,468	44.73%	24	0.24%	38	0.38%	990	9.91%	9,988
Cheyenne	1,610	67.99%	736	31.08%	16	0.68%	6	0.25%	874	36.91%	2,368
Clark	950	55.69%	741	43.43%	11	0.64%	4	0.23%	209	12.25%	1,706
Clay	4,101	74.01%	1,391	25.10%	35	0.63%	14	0.25%	2,710	48.91%	5,541
Cloud	4,377	63.67%	2,391	34.78%	78	1.13%	29	0.42%	1,986	28.89%	6,875
Coffey	3,461	67.28%	1,660	32.27%	15	0.29%	8	0.16%	1,801	35.01%	5,144
Comanche	1,048	61.47%	642	37.65%	15	0.88%	0	0.00%	406	23.81%	1,705
Cowley	8,453	55.91%	6,577	43.50%	61	0.40%	29	0.19%	1,876	12.41%	15,120
Crawford	9,017	52.09%	8,211	47.43%	27	0.16%	56	0.32%	806	4.66%	17,311
Decatur	1,758	59.92%	1,159	39.50%	12	0.41%	5	0.17%	599	20.42%	2,934
Dickinson	6,227	65.92%	3,190	33.77%	19	0.20%	10	0.11%	3,037	32.15%	9,446
Doniphan	3,230	71.92%	1,261	28.08%	0	0.00%	0	0.00%	1,969	43.84%	4,491
Douglas	8,224	67.47%	3,886	31.88%	30	0.25%	49	0.40%	4,338	35.59%	12,189
Edwards	1,669	65.09%	876	34.17%	11	0.43%	8	0.31%	793	30.93%	2,564
Elk	2,283	70.33%	954	29.39%	7	0.22%	2	0.06%	1,329	40.94%	3,246
Ellis	3,369	60.13%	2,218	39.59%	9	0.16%	7	0.12%	1,151	20.54%	5,603
Ellsworth	2,290	57.62%	1,678	42.22%	2	0.05%	4	0.10%	612	15.40%	3,974
Finney	2,366	58.20%	1,667	41.01%	23	0.57%	9	0.22%	699	17.20%	4,065
Ford	4,110	57.23%	2,994	41.69%	60	0.84%	17	0.24%	1,116	15.54%	7,181
Franklin	5,375	64.68%	2,880	34.66%	38	0.46%	17	0.20%	2,495	30.02%	8,310
Geary	2,833	56.97%	2,107	42.37%	21	0.42%	12	0.24%	726	14.60%	4,973
Gove	1,125	72.02%	420	26.89%	6	0.38%	11	0.70%	705	45.13%	1,562
Graham	1,651	66.52%	814	32.80%	13	0.52%	4	0.16%	837	33.72%	2,482
Grant	566	66.35%	282	33.06%	3	0.35%	2	0.23%	284	33.29%	853
Gray	1,057	57.01%	775	41.80%	17	0.92%	5	0.27%	282	15.21%	1,854
Greeley	378	63.00%	215	35.83%	7	1.17%	0	0.00%	163	27.17%	600
Greenwood	3,959	63.99%	2,187	35.35%	26	0.42%	15	0.24%	1,772	28.64%	6,187
Hamilton	795	62.35%	471	36.94%	4	0.31%	5	0.39%	324	25.41%	1,275
Harper	2,849	63.76%	1,573	35.21%	33	0.74%	13	0.29%	1,276	28.56%	4,468
Harvey	5,339	61.35%	3,300	37.92%	26	0.30%	38	0.44%	2,039	23.43%	8,703
Haskell	520	59.91%	342	39.40%	6	0.69%	0	0.00%	178	20.51%	868
Hodgeman	982	66.31%	490	33.09%	1	0.07%	8	0.54%	492	33.22%	1,481
Jackson	3,665	69.72%	1,567	29.81%	15	0.29%	10	0.19%	2,098	39.91%	5,257
Jefferson	3,504	68.73%	1,575	30.89%	6	0.12%	13	0.26%	1,929	37.84%	5,098
Jewell	3,754	74.20%	1,216	24.04%	80	1.58%	9	0.18%	2,538	50.17%	5,059
Johnson	11,951	67.24%	5,771	32.47%	29	0.16%	22	0.12%	6,180	34.77%	17,773
Kearny	612	62.45%	365	37.24%	1	0.10%	2	0.20%	247	25.20%	980
Kingman	2,827	63.74%	1,579	35.60%	22	0.50%	7	0.16%	1,248	28.14%	4,435
Kiowa	1,479	69.60%	618	29.08%	26	1.22%	2	0.09%	861	40.52%	2,125
Labette	7,480	57.87%	5,398	41.76%	26	0.20%	22	0.17%	2,082	16.11%	12,926
Lane	773	65.90%	388	33.08%	4	0.34%	8	0.68%	385	32.82%	1,173
Leavenworth	7,282	58.55%	5,097	40.98%	25	0.20%	34	0.27%	2,185	17.57%	12,438
Lincoln	2,405	72.03%	910	27.25%	15	0.45%	9	0.27%	1,495	44.77%	3,339
Linn	3,185	68.54%	1,442	31.03%	8	0.17%	12	0.26%	1,743	37.51%	4,647
Logan	1,107	72.92%	406	26.75%	4	0.26%	1	0.07%	701	46.18%	1,518
Lyon	5,710	52.88%	4,984	46.15%	77	0.71%	28	0.26%	726	6.72%	10,799
Marion	5,219	72.64%	1,925	26.79%	15	0.21%	26	0.36%	3,294	45.85%	7,185
Marshall	6,184	69.59%	2,681	30.17%	12	0.14%	9	0.10%	3,503	39.42%	8,886
McPherson	5,840	62.31%	3,321	35.44%	136	1.45%	75	0.80%	2,519	26.88%	9,372
Meade	1,424	68.23%	631	30.23%	30	1.44%	2	0.10%	793	38.00%	2,087
Miami	4,326	57.28%	3,217	42.60%	5	0.07%	4	0.05%	1,109	14.68%	7,552
Mitchell	3,238	66.67%	1,579	32.51%	28	0.58%	12	0.25%	1,659	34.16%	4,857
Montgomery	11,738	62.29%	7,063	37.48%	29	0.15%	14	0.07%	4,675	24.81%	18,844
Morris	2,628	62.11%	1,584	37.44%	10	0.24%	9	0.21%	1,044	24.68%	4,231
Morton	617	62.51%	367	37.18%	3	0.30%	0	0.00%	250	25.33%	987
Nemaha	4,277	66.44%	2,149	33.39%	2	0.03%	9	0.14%	2,128	33.06%	6,437
Neosho	5,420	62.45%	3,233	37.25%	19	0.22%	7	0.08%	2,187	25.20%	8,679
Ness	1,745	65.45%	876	32.86%	32	1.20%	13	0.49%	869	32.60%	2,666
Norton	2,890	70.87%	1,159	28.42%	16	0.39%	13	0.32%	1,731	42.45%	4,078
Osage	4,107	64.40%	2,212	34.69%	39	0.61%	19	0.30%	1,895	29.72%	6,377
Osborne	2,827	71.52%	1,078	27.27%	34	0.86%	14	0.35%	1,749	44.24%	3,953
Ottawa	2,428	63.11%	1,378	35.82%	29	0.75%	12	0.31%	1,050	27.29%	3,847
Pawnee	2,057	54.05%	1,727	45.38%	14	0.37%	8	0.21%	330	8.67%	3,806
Phillips	3,053	72.74%	1,098	26.16%	34	0.81%	12	0.29%	1,955	46.58%	4,197
Pottawatomie	4,074	70.01%	1,727	29.68%	12	0.21%	6	0.10%	2,347	40.33%	5,819
Pratt	2,658	52.85%	2,334	46.41%	26	0.52%	11	0.22%	324	6.44%	5,029
Rawlins	1,569	61.72%	955	37.57%	9	0.35%	9	0.35%	614	24.15%	2,542
Reno	11,004	58.71%	7,604	40.57%	95	0.51%	40	0.21%	3,400	18.14%	18,743
Republic	3,802	66.53%	1,891	33.09%	16	0.28%	6	0.10%	1,911	33.44%	5,715
Rice	4,024	61.12%	2,505	38.05%	34	0.52%	21	0.32%	1,519	23.07%	6,584
Riley	6,511	70.43%	2,659	28.76%	39	0.42%	35	0.38%	3,852	41.67%	9,244
Rooks	2,361	66.53%	1,166	32.85%	18	0.51%	4	0.11%	1,195	33.67%	3,549
Rush	2,193	66.80%	1,076	32.77%	4	0.12%	10	0.30%	1,117	34.02%	3,283
Russell	3,344	67.56%	1,583	31.98%	14	0.28%	9	0.18%	1,761	35.58%	4,950
Saline	7,571	59.51%	5,097	40.06%	36	0.28%	19	0.15%	2,474	19.45%	12,723
Scott	903	60.93%	565	38.12%	10	0.67%	4	0.27%	338	22.81%	1,482
Sedgwick	38,896	52.78%	34,442	46.73%	188	0.26%	172	0.23%	4,454	6.04%	73,698
Seward	1,590	53.92%	1,342	45.51%	13	0.44%	4	0.14%	248	8.41%	2,949
Shawnee	21,396	59.03%	14,678	40.49%	108	0.30%	65	0.18%	6,718	18.53%	36,247
Sheridan	1,342	66.87%	658	32.79%	3	0.15%	4	0.20%	684	34.08%	2,007
Sherman	1,608	60.07%	1,021	38.14%	29	1.08%	19	0.71%	587	21.93%	2,677
Smith	3,282	69.93%	1,377	29.34%	30	0.64%	4	0.09%	1,905	40.59%	4,693
Stafford	2,493	56.25%	1,908	43.05%	20	0.45%	11	0.25%	585	13.20%	4,432
Stanton	398	61.71%	240	37.21%	5	0.78%	2	0.31%	158	24.50%	645
Stevens	760	64.63%	414	35.20%	2	0.17%	0	0.00%	346	29.42%	1,176
Sumner	6,343	59.87%	4,187	39.52%	38	0.36%	26	0.25%	2,156	20.35%	10,594
Thomas	1,631	59.14%	1,097	39.78%	19	0.69%	11	0.40%	534	19.36%	2,758
Trego	1,459	61.98%	883	37.51%	4	0.17%	8	0.34%	576	24.47%	2,354
Wabaunsee	2,839	75.95%	873	23.35%	8	0.21%	18	0.48%	1,966	52.59%	3,738
Wallace	720	70.80%	292	28.71%	5	0.49%	0	0.00%	428	42.08%	1,017
Washington	5,040	77.11%	1,455	22.26%	24	0.37%	17	0.26%	3,585	54.85%	6,536
Wichita	604	64.32%	329	35.04%	6	0.64%	0	0.00%	275	29.29%	939
Wilson	4,248	68.57%	1,912	30.86%	17	0.27%	18	0.29%	2,336	37.71%	6,195
Woodson	2,308	69.56%	999	30.11%	2	0.06%	9	0.27%	1,309	39.45%	3,318
Wyandotte	26,817	44.74%	32,914	54.91%	128	0.21%	86	0.14%	-6,097	-10.17%	59,945
Totals	442,096	60.25%	287,458	39.18%	2,609	0.36%	1,613	0.22%	154,638	21.07%	733,776

==== Counties that flipped from Democratic to Republican ====
- Crawford
- Cherokee
- Clark
- Sedgewick

== See also ==
- United States presidential elections in Kansas
