= 1868 United States presidential election in Kansas =

- November 3, 1868
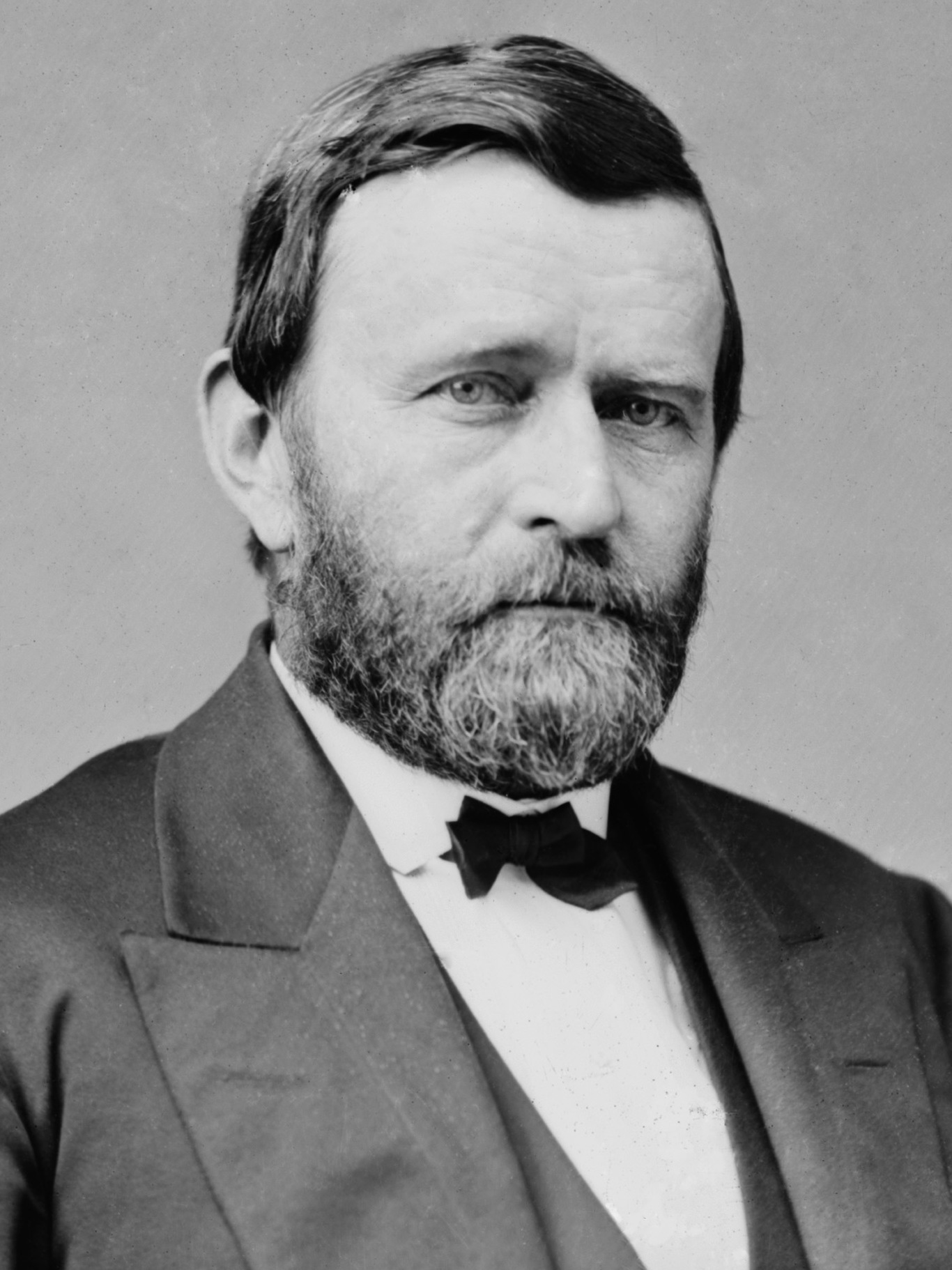

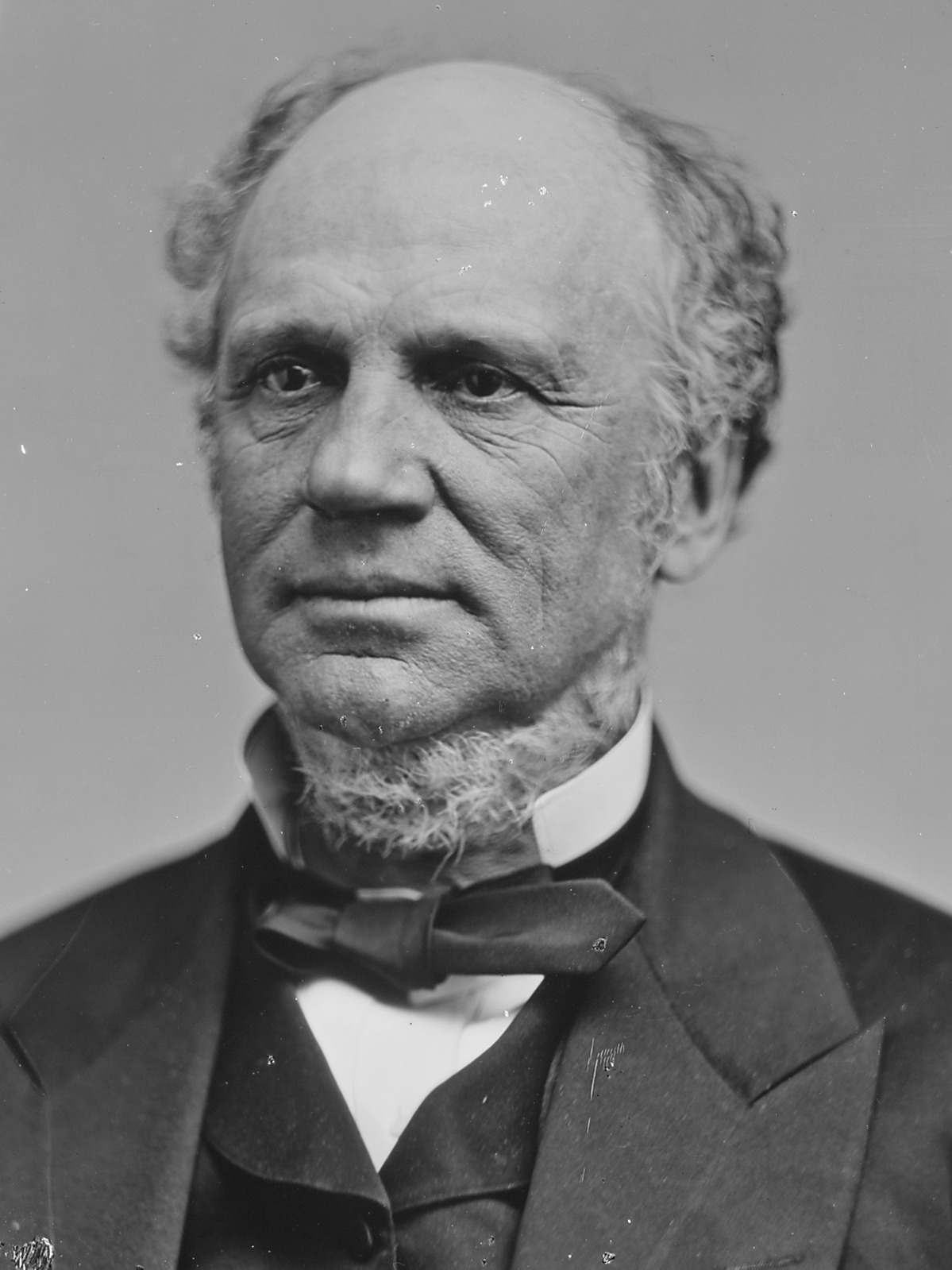
Nominee	Ulysses S. Grant	Horatio Seymour
Party	Republican	Democratic
Home state	Illinois	New York
Running mate	Schuyler Colfax	Francis Preston Blair Jr.
Electoral vote	3	0
Popular vote	30,027	13,600
Percentage	68.82%	31.17%
County results
Grant
50–60%
60–70%
70–80%
80–90%
90–100%
Seymour
50–60%
70–80%
Unknown/No vote
President before election
Andrew Johnson
Democratic
Elected President
Ulysses S. Grant
Republican

The 1868 United States presidential election in Kansas took place on November 3, 1868, as part of the 1868 United States presidential election. Voters chose three representatives, or electors to the Electoral College, who voted for president and vice president.

Kansas voted for the Republican nominee, Ulysses S. Grant, over the Democratic nominee, Horatio Seymour. Grant won the state by a margin of 37.65%.

With 68.82% of the popular vote, Kansas would be Grant's third strongest victory in terms of popular vote percentage after Vermont and Massachusetts.

== Results ==
1868 United States presidential election in Kansas
Party	Candidate	Running mate	Popular vote		Electoral vote	
Party	Candidate	Running mate	Count	%	Count	%
Republican	Ulysses S. Grant of Illinois	Schuyler Colfax of Indiana	30,027	68.82%	3	100.00%
Democratic	Horatio Seymour of New York	Francis Preston Blair Jr. of Missouri	13,600	31.17%	0	0.00%
N/A	Others	Others	3	0.01%	0	0.00%
Total			43,630	100.00%	3	100.00%

== See also ==
- United States presidential elections in Kansas
