= 1948 United States presidential election in Kansas =

- November 2, 1948

All 8 Kansas votes to the Electoral College
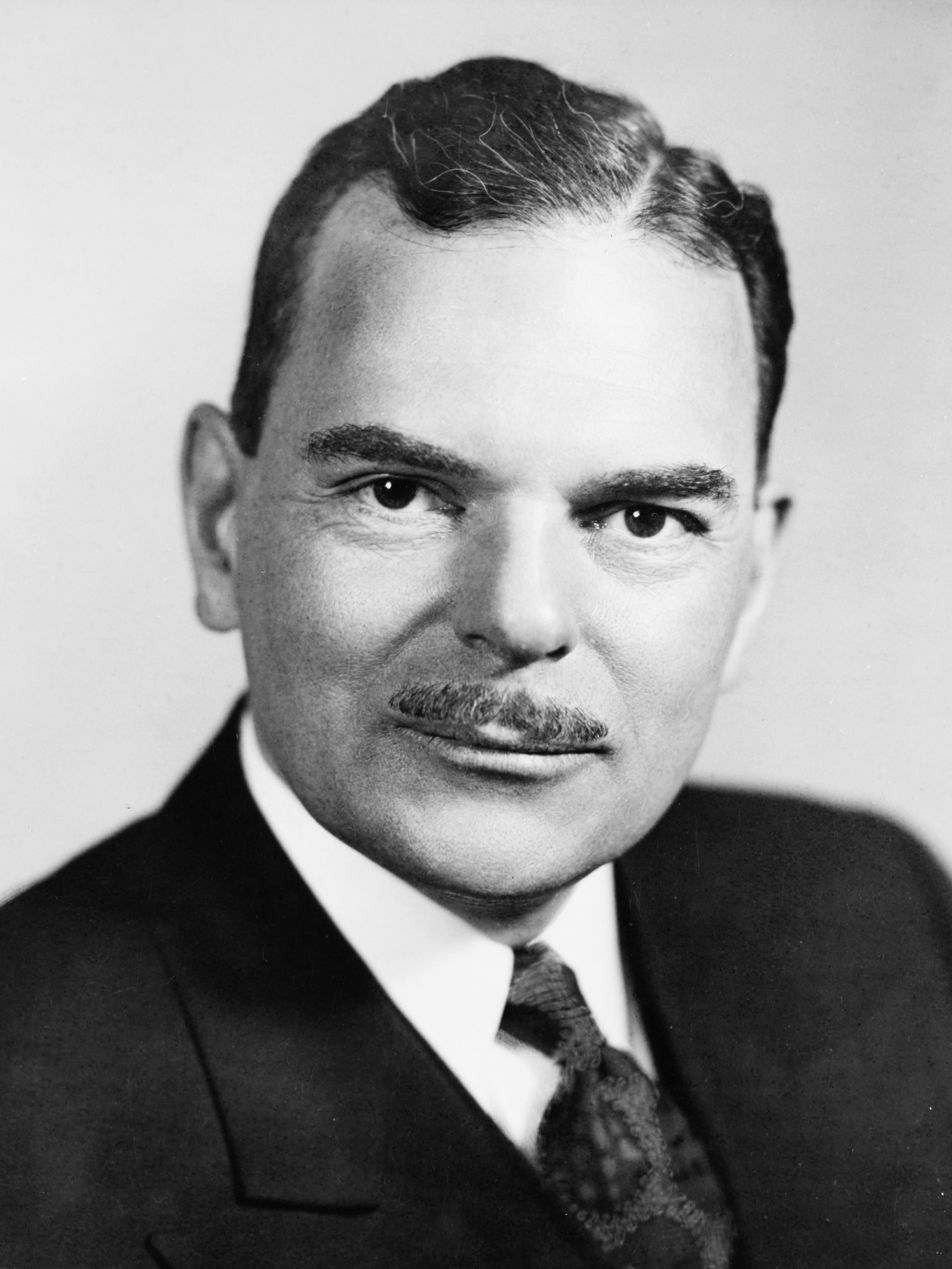

Nominee	Thomas E. Dewey	Harry S. Truman
Party	Republican	Democratic
Home state	New York	Missouri
Running mate	Earl Warren	Alben W. Barkley
Electoral vote	8	0
Popular vote	423,039	351,902
Percentage	53.63%	44.61%
County results
Dewey
40–50%
50–60%
60–70%
Truman
40–50%
50–60%
60–70%
President before election
Harry S. Truman
Democratic
Elected President
Harry S. Truman
Democratic

The 1948 United States presidential election in Kansas took place on November 2, 1948, as part of the 1948 United States presidential election. Voters chose eight representatives, or electors, to the Electoral College, who voted for president and vice president.

Kansas was won by Governor Thomas E. Dewey (R–New York), running with Governor Earl Warren, with 53.63 percent of the popular vote, against incumbent President Harry S. Truman (D–Missouri), running with Senator Alben W. Barkley, with 44.61 percent of the popular vote.

With 53.63 percent of the popular vote, Kansas would prove to be Dewey's fourth strongest state in the nation after Vermont, Maine and neighboring Nebraska.

== Results ==
1948 United States presidential election in Kansas
Party	Candidate	Votes	%
Republican	Thomas E. Dewey	423,039	53.63%
Democratic	Harry S. Truman (inc.)	351,902	44.61%
Prohibition	Claude A. Watson	6,468	0.82%
Independent	Henry A. Wallace	4,603	0.58%
Socialist	Norman Thomas	2,807	0.38%
Total votes		788,819	100%

=== Results by county ===
County	Thomas E. Dewey Republican		Harry S. Truman Democratic		Claude A. Watson Prohibition		Henry A. Wallace Independent		Norman Thomas Socialist		Margin		Total votes cast
County	#	%	#	%	#	%	#	%	#	%	#	%	Total votes cast
Allen	4,704	61.21%	2,891	37.62%	59	0.77%	19	0.25%	12	0.16%	1,813	23.59%	7,685
Anderson	2,787	56.85%	2,071	42.25%	12	0.24%	21	0.43%	11	0.22%	716	14.60%	4,902
Atchison	4,141	51.04%	3,910	48.19%	12	0.15%	31	0.38%	19	0.23%	231	2.85%	8,113
Barber	2,013	50.92%	1,891	47.84%	24	0.61%	12	0.30%	13	0.33%	122	3.08%	3,953
Barton	6,191	53.37%	5,307	45.75%	29	0.25%	48	0.41%	25	0.22%	884	7.62%	11,600
Bourbon	4,225	51.43%	3,879	47.22%	69	0.84%	33	0.40%	9	0.11%	346	4.21%	8,215
Brown	4,518	67.98%	2,060	31.00%	44	0.66%	12	0.18%	12	0.18%	2,458	36.98%	6,646
Butler	6,551	50.58%	6,269	48.40%	82	0.63%	34	0.26%	16	0.12%	282	2.18%	12,952
Chase	1,432	58.93%	961	39.55%	20	0.82%	7	0.29%	10	0.41%	471	19.38%	2,430
Chautauqua	1,925	59.34%	1,261	38.87%	20	0.62%	25	0.77%	13	0.40%	664	20.47%	3,244
Cherokee	4,616	47.77%	4,854	50.23%	46	0.48%	106	1.10%	41	0.42%	-238	-2.46%	9,663
Cheyenne	1,219	53.51%	978	42.93%	56	2.46%	9	0.40%	16	0.70%	241	10.58%	2,278
Clark	999	55.29%	777	43.00%	17	0.94%	8	0.44%	6	0.33%	222	12.29%	1,807
Clay	3,763	65.89%	1,804	31.59%	99	1.73%	23	0.40%	22	0.39%	1,959	34.30%	5,711
Cloud	4,018	56.16%	2,891	40.41%	198	2.77%	23	0.32%	25	0.35%	1,127	15.75%	7,155
Coffey	2,945	61.20%	1,796	37.32%	34	0.71%	21	0.44%	16	0.33%	1,149	23.88%	4,812
Comanche	1,077	61.90%	650	37.36%	7	0.40%	1	0.06%	5	0.29%	427	24.54%	1,740
Cowley	8,102	52.13%	7,042	45.31%	279	1.80%	71	0.46%	47	0.30%	1,060	6.82%	15,541
Crawford	8,229	46.19%	9,005	50.55%	72	0.40%	438	2.46%	71	0.40%	-776	-4.36%	17,815
Decatur	1,545	51.41%	1,402	46.66%	37	1.23%	15	0.50%	6	0.20%	143	4.75%	3,005
Dickinson	5,918	59.98%	3,815	38.66%	77	0.78%	37	0.37%	20	0.20%	2,103	21.32%	9,867
Doniphan	2,785	63.74%	1,555	35.59%	5	0.11%	13	0.30%	11	0.25%	1,230	28.15%	4,369
Douglas	9,287	64.25%	4,778	33.06%	54	0.37%	174	1.20%	161	1.11%	4,509	31.19%	14,454
Edwards	1,627	58.15%	1,083	38.71%	64	2.29%	9	0.32%	15	0.54%	544	19.44%	2,798
Elk	1,962	63.80%	1,087	35.35%	11	0.36%	6	0.20%	9	0.29%	875	28.45%	3,075
Ellis	2,676	40.51%	3,863	58.48%	12	0.18%	30	0.45%	25	0.38%	-1,187	-17.97%	6,606
Ellsworth	2,155	52.83%	1,879	46.07%	7	0.17%	25	0.61%	13	0.32%	276	6.76%	4,079
Finney	2,508	50.01%	2,367	47.20%	102	2.03%	24	0.48%	14	0.28%	141	2.81%	5,015
Ford	4,089	47.21%	4,396	50.75%	107	1.24%	48	0.55%	22	0.25%	-307	-3.54%	8,662
Franklin	5,145	58.24%	3,467	39.25%	137	1.55%	50	0.57%	35	0.40%	1,678	18.99%	8,834
Geary	2,864	49.72%	2,810	48.78%	56	0.97%	17	0.30%	13	0.23%	54	0.94%	5,760
Gove	1,030	57.48%	719	40.12%	10	0.56%	22	1.23%	11	0.61%	311	17.36%	1,792
Graham	1,380	59.28%	913	39.22%	22	0.95%	4	0.17%	9	0.39%	467	20.06%	2,328
Grant	742	53.34%	625	44.93%	13	0.93%	5	0.36%	6	0.43%	117	8.41%	1,391
Gray	1,035	53.68%	869	45.07%	15	0.78%	5	0.26%	4	0.21%	166	8.61%	1,928
Greeley	391	53.34%	326	44.47%	9	1.23%	3	0.41%	4	0.55%	65	8.87%	733
Greenwood	3,553	57.31%	2,574	41.52%	41	0.66%	13	0.21%	19	0.31%	979	15.79%	6,200
Hamilton	749	50.64%	722	48.82%	2	0.14%	4	0.27%	2	0.14%	27	1.82%	1,479
Harper	2,702	59.25%	1,752	38.42%	76	1.67%	12	0.26%	18	0.39%	950	20.83%	4,560
Harvey	5,270	57.72%	3,615	39.59%	71	0.78%	70	0.77%	104	1.14%	1,655	18.13%	9,130
Haskell	592	54.66%	466	43.03%	17	1.57%	4	0.37%	4	0.37%	126	11.63%	1,083
Hodgeman	945	60.77%	590	37.94%	7	0.45%	9	0.58%	4	0.26%	355	22.83%	1,555
Jackson	3,166	61.30%	1,958	37.91%	18	0.35%	12	0.23%	11	0.21%	1,208	23.39%	5,165
Jefferson	2,986	59.04%	2,010	39.74%	27	0.53%	18	0.36%	17	0.34%	976	19.30%	5,058
Jewell	3,143	63.18%	1,574	31.64%	199	4.00%	17	0.34%	42	0.84%	1,569	31.54%	4,975
Johnson	14,191	60.70%	8,982	38.42%	43	0.18%	68	0.29%	94	0.40%	5,209	22.28%	23,378
Kearny	676	54.43%	541	43.56%	2	0.16%	10	0.81%	13	1.05%	135	10.87%	1,242
Kingman	2,640	55.88%	2,008	42.51%	51	1.08%	16	0.34%	9	0.19%	632	13.37%	4,724
Kiowa	1,258	59.79%	722	34.32%	114	5.42%	7	0.33%	3	0.14%	536	25.47%	2,104
Labette	6,298	50.12%	6,113	48.65%	56	0.45%	51	0.41%	47	0.37%	185	1.47%	12,565
Lane	764	57.53%	525	39.53%	13	0.98%	9	0.68%	17	1.28%	239	18.00%	1,328
Leavenworth	6,474	48.61%	6,740	50.61%	12	0.09%	51	0.38%	40	0.30%	-266	-2.00%	13,317
Lincoln	2,181	65.73%	1,094	32.97%	27	0.81%	11	0.33%	5	0.15%	1,087	32.76%	3,318
Linn	2,632	60.45%	1,673	38.42%	21	0.48%	16	0.37%	12	0.28%	959	22.03%	4,354
Logan	1,105	63.73%	579	33.39%	36	2.08%	11	0.63%	3	0.17%	526	30.34%	1,734
Lyon	5,941	50.03%	5,708	48.06%	129	1.09%	55	0.46%	43	0.36%	233	1.97%	11,876
Marion	4,724	64.85%	2,421	33.23%	32	0.44%	38	0.52%	70	0.96%	2,303	31.62%	7,285
Marshall	5,122	61.50%	3,148	37.80%	24	0.29%	19	0.23%	16	0.19%	1,974	23.70%	8,329
McPherson	5,952	57.54%	3,879	37.50%	287	2.77%	150	1.45%	76	0.73%	2,073	20.04%	10,344
Meade	1,406	60.19%	834	35.70%	73	3.13%	16	0.68%	7	0.30%	572	24.49%	2,336
Miami	3,650	49.40%	3,660	49.54%	27	0.37%	24	0.32%	27	0.37%	-10	-0.14%	7,388
Mitchell	2,998	62.16%	1,750	36.28%	34	0.70%	24	0.50%	17	0.35%	1,248	25.88%	4,823
Montgomery	10,636	54.70%	8,621	44.34%	62	0.32%	82	0.42%	43	0.22%	2,015	10.36%	19,444
Morris	2,285	56.46%	1,701	42.03%	24	0.59%	20	0.49%	17	0.42%	584	14.43%	4,047
Morton	624	52.61%	545	45.95%	17	1.43%	0	0.00%	0	0.00%	79	6.66%	1,186
Nemaha	3,529	55.39%	2,810	44.11%	10	0.16%	13	0.20%	9	0.14%	719	11.28%	6,371
Neosho	5,072	56.69%	3,770	42.14%	60	0.67%	28	0.31%	17	0.19%	1,302	14.55%	8,947
Ness	1,689	58.10%	1,130	38.87%	55	1.89%	22	0.76%	11	0.38%	559	19.23%	2,907
Norton	2,461	60.98%	1,414	35.03%	108	2.68%	38	0.94%	15	0.37%	1,047	25.95%	4,036
Osage	3,474	55.55%	2,659	42.52%	61	0.98%	44	0.70%	16	0.26%	815	13.03%	6,254
Osborne	2,603	62.87%	1,420	34.30%	99	2.39%	11	0.27%	7	0.17%	1,183	28.57%	4,140
Ottawa	2,203	59.00%	1,424	38.14%	57	1.53%	21	0.56%	29	0.78%	779	20.86%	3,734
Pawnee	2,221	52.44%	1,945	45.93%	41	0.97%	22	0.52%	6	0.14%	276	6.51%	4,235
Phillips	2,715	66.32%	1,223	29.87%	116	2.83%	24	0.59%	16	0.39%	1,492	36.45%	4,094
Pottawatomie	3,709	62.64%	2,167	36.60%	18	0.30%	17	0.29%	10	0.17%	1,542	26.04%	5,921
Pratt	2,878	50.22%	2,751	48.00%	66	1.15%	21	0.37%	15	0.26%	127	2.22%	5,731
Rawlins	1,389	55.08%	1,095	43.42%	14	0.56%	18	0.71%	6	0.24%	294	11.66%	2,522
Reno	11,187	51.87%	9,957	46.17%	225	1.04%	120	0.56%	78	0.36%	1,230	5.70%	21,567
Republic	3,375	60.42%	2,109	37.76%	60	1.07%	28	0.50%	14	0.25%	1,266	22.66%	5,586
Rice	4,002	58.15%	2,752	39.99%	68	0.99%	40	0.58%	20	0.29%	1,250	18.16%	6,882
Riley	9,227	68.01%	4,052	29.87%	100	0.74%	119	0.88%	69	0.51%	5,175	38.14%	13,567
Rooks	2,197	56.59%	1,636	42.14%	32	0.82%	11	0.28%	6	0.15%	561	14.45%	3,882
Rush	1,840	56.41%	1,360	41.69%	22	0.67%	17	0.52%	23	0.71%	480	14.72%	3,262
Russell	3,113	56.48%	2,343	42.51%	23	0.42%	19	0.34%	14	0.25%	770	13.97%	5,512
Saline	7,928	53.14%	6,798	45.56%	73	0.49%	75	0.50%	46	0.31%	1,130	7.58%	14,920
Scott	1,040	56.86%	739	40.40%	29	1.59%	8	0.44%	13	0.71%	301	16.46%	1,829
Sedgwick	39,165	49.56%	38,621	48.87%	648	0.82%	327	0.41%	268	0.34%	544	0.69%	79,029
Seward	1,829	52.00%	1,614	45.89%	59	1.68%	7	0.20%	8	0.23%	215	6.11%	3,517
Shawnee	23,673	52.83%	20,346	45.41%	210	0.47%	412	0.92%	167	0.37%	3,327	7.42%	44,808
Sheridan	1,097	52.69%	966	46.40%	7	0.34%	8	0.38%	4	0.19%	131	6.29%	2,082
Sherman	1,380	50.00%	1,289	46.70%	59	2.14%	15	0.54%	17	0.62%	91	3.30%	2,760
Smith	2,760	61.94%	1,590	35.68%	85	1.91%	18	0.40%	3	0.07%	1,170	26.26%	4,456
Stafford	2,304	51.74%	2,049	46.01%	71	1.59%	20	0.45%	9	0.20%	255	5.73%	4,453
Stanton	407	56.53%	300	41.67%	8	1.11%	1	0.14%	4	0.56%	107	14.86%	720
Stevens	822	54.04%	666	43.79%	19	1.25%	8	0.53%	6	0.39%	156	10.25%	1,521
Sumner	5,922	55.42%	4,571	42.78%	113	1.06%	27	0.25%	52	0.49%	1,351	12.64%	10,685
Thomas	1,497	49.41%	1,476	48.71%	37	1.22%	10	0.33%	10	0.33%	21	0.70%	3,030
Trego	1,237	51.82%	1,117	46.80%	9	0.38%	6	0.25%	18	0.75%	120	5.02%	2,387
Wabaunsee	2,437	66.80%	1,162	31.85%	25	0.69%	15	0.41%	9	0.25%	1,275	34.95%	3,648
Wallace	637	58.23%	439	40.13%	7	0.64%	7	0.64%	4	0.37%	198	18.10%	1,094
Washington	3,894	66.19%	1,894	32.19%	36	0.61%	37	0.63%	22	0.37%	2,000	34.00%	5,883
Wichita	606	56.27%	443	41.13%	20	1.86%	3	0.28%	5	0.46%	163	15.14%	1,077
Wilson	3,868	59.45%	2,538	39.01%	47	0.72%	31	0.48%	22	0.34%	1,330	20.44%	6,506
Woodson	1,997	62.58%	1,145	35.88%	20	0.63%	9	0.28%	20	0.63%	852	26.70%	3,191
Wyandotte	24,398	36.53%	41,366	61.94%	192	0.29%	660	0.99%	172	0.26%	-16,968	-25.41%	66,788
Totals	423,039	53.63%	351,902	44.61%	6,468	0.82%	4,603	0.58%	2,807	0.36%	71,137	9.02%	788,819

==== Counties that flipped from Republican to Democratic ====
- Crawford
- Cherokee
- Ellis
- Ford
- Leavenworth
- Miami

== See also ==
- United States presidential elections in Kansas
