= 1880 United States presidential election in Kansas =

- November 2, 1880
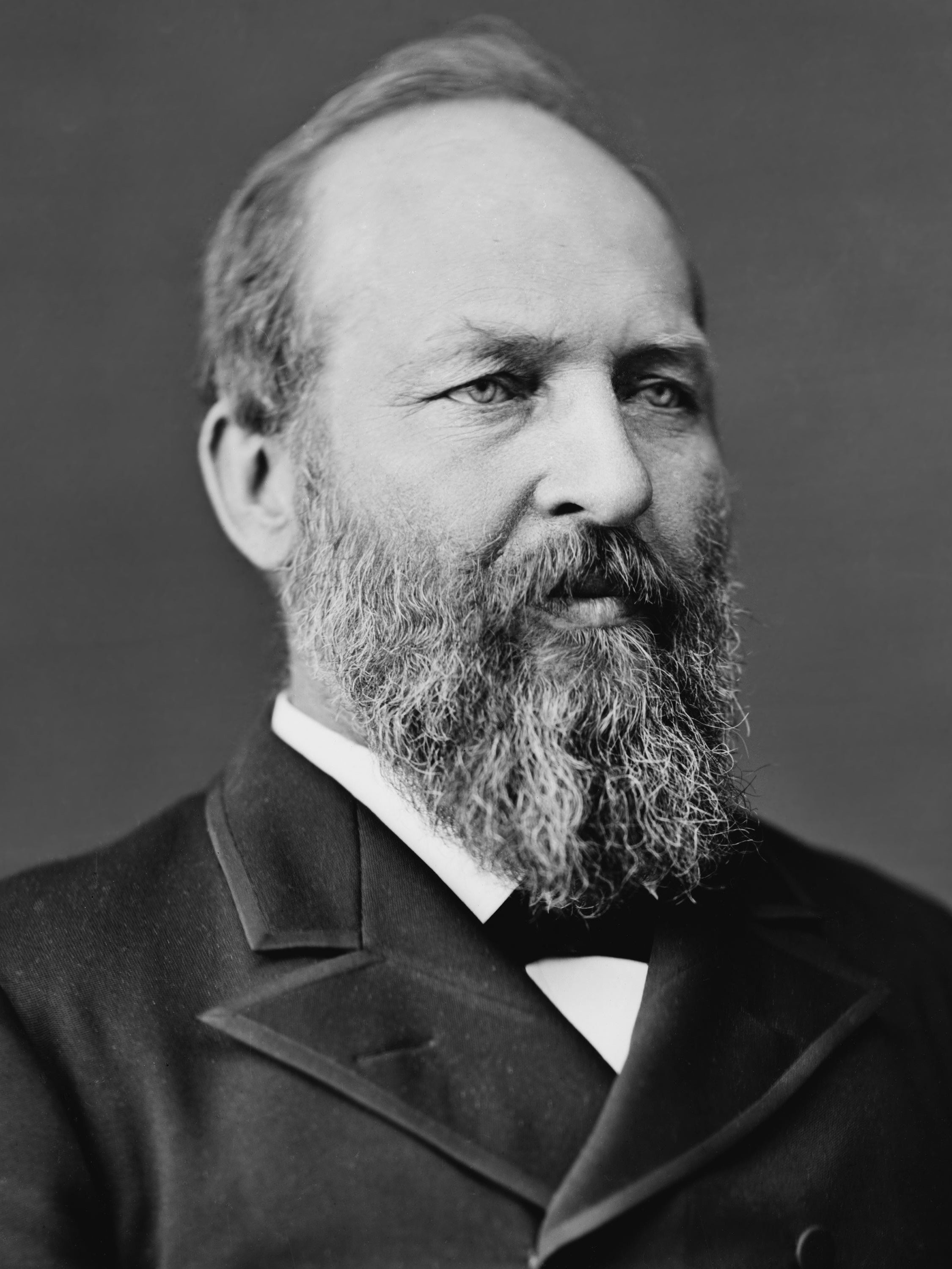

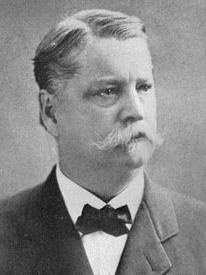

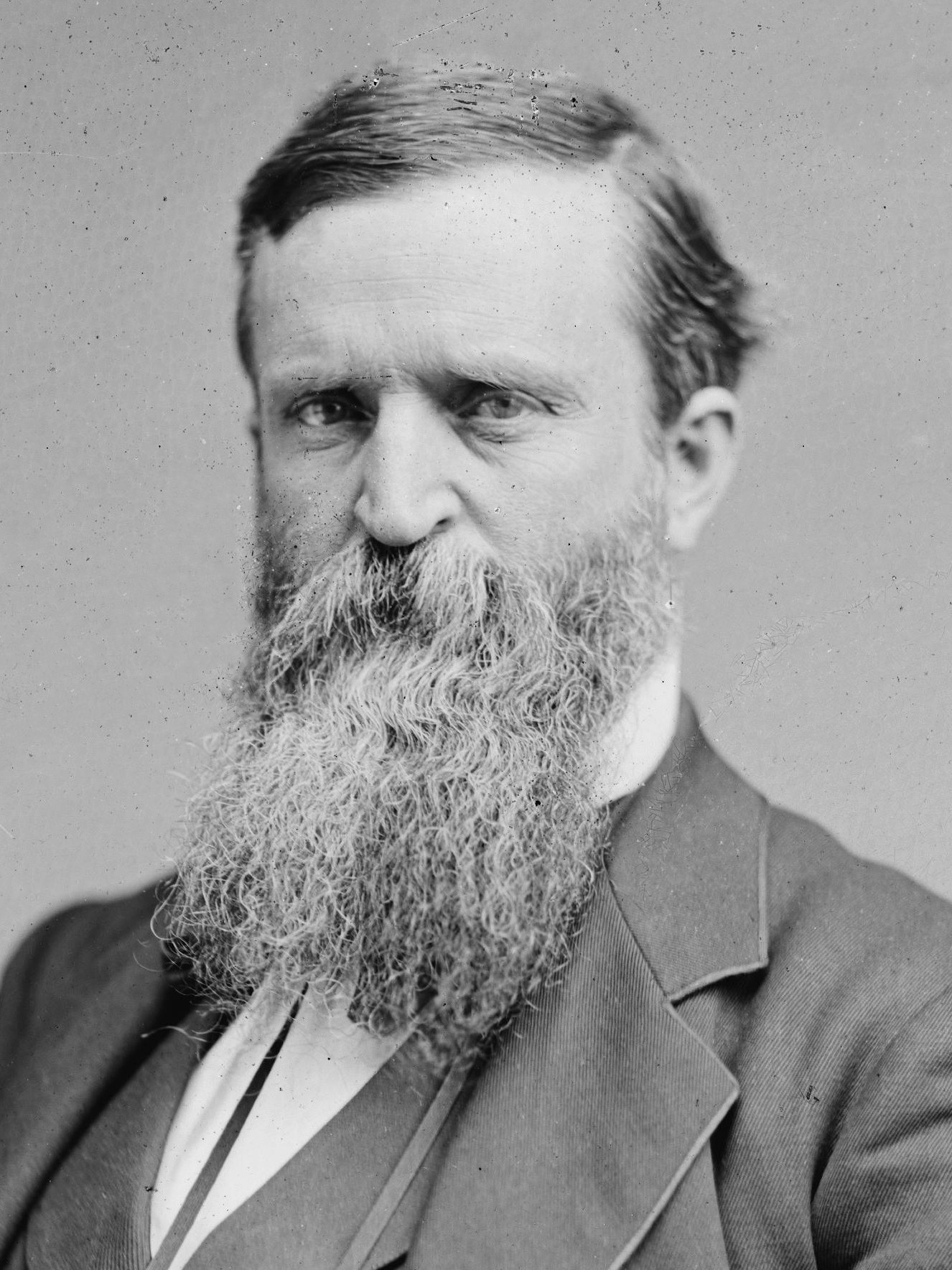
Nominee	James A. Garfield	Winfield Scott Hancock	James B. Weaver
Party	Republican	Democratic	Greenback
Home state	Ohio	Pennsylvania	Iowa
Running mate	Chester A. Arthur	William Hayden English	Barzillai J. Chambers
Electoral vote	5	0	0
Popular vote	121,549	59,801	19,851
Percentage	60.40%	29.72%	9.86%
County results
Garfield
40–50%
50–60%
60–70%
70–80%
President before election
Rutherford B. Hayes
Republican
Elected President
James A. Garfield
Republican

The 1880 United States presidential election in Kansas took place on November 2, 1880, as part of the 1880 United States presidential election. Voters chose five representatives, or electors to the Electoral College, who voted for president and vice president.

Kansas voted for the Republican nominee, James A. Garfield, over the Democratic nominee, Winfield Scott Hancock. Garfield won the state by a margin of 30.68 points.

With 60.40 percent of the popular vote, Kansas would be Garfield's fifth strongest victory in terms of percentage in the popular vote after Vermont, Nebraska, Minnesota and Rhode Island. The state would also prove to be Weaver's fourth strongest state after Texas, Iowa, and Michigan.

== Results ==
1880 United States presidential election in Kansas
Party	Candidate	Running mate	Popular vote		Electoral vote	
Party	Candidate	Running mate	Count	%	Count	%
Republican	James A. Garfield of Ohio	Chester A. Arthur of New York	121,549	60.40%	5	100.00%
Democratic	Winfield Scott Hancock of Pennsylvania	William Hayden English of Indiana	59,801	29.72%	0	0.00%
Greenback	James B. Weaver of Iowa	Barzillai J. Chambers of Texas	19,851	9.86%	0	0.00%
Anti-Masonic	John W. Phelps of Vermont	Samuel C. Pomeroy of Kansas	25	0.01%	0	0.00%
Prohibition	Neal Dow of Maine	Henry Adams Thompson of Ohio	10	<0.01%	0	0.00%
Total			201,236	100.00%	5	100.00%

=== Results by county ===
1880 United States presidential election in Kansas by county
County	James Abram Garfield Republican		Winfield Scott Hancock Democratic		James Baird Weaver Greenback		Various candidates Other parties		Margin		Total votes cast
County	#	%	#	%	#	%	#	%	#	%	Total votes cast
Allen	1,576	65.04%	803	33.14%	44	1.82%	0	0.00%	773	31.90%	2,423
Anderson	1,127	56.52%	497	24.92%	370	18.56%	0	0.00%	630	31.59%	1,994
Atchison	2,835	56.28%	2,131	42.31%	71	1.41%	0	0.00%	704	13.98%	5,037
Barber	262	52.40%	175	35.00%	63	12.60%	0	0.00%	87	17.40%	500
Barton	1,172	60.16%	714	36.65%	62	3.18%	0	0.00%	458	23.51%	1,948
Bourbon	2,320	60.34%	1,161	30.20%	364	9.47%	0	0.00%	1,159	30.14%	3,845
Brown	1,875	65.01%	898	31.14%	107	3.71%	4	0.14%	977	33.88%	2,884
Butler	2,398	60.68%	1,120	28.34%	434	10.98%	0	0.00%	1,278	32.34%	3,952
Chase	716	49.41%	324	22.36%	409	28.23%	0	0.00%	307 (Note: In this county where Weaver ran second ahead of Hancock, margin given is Garfield vote minus Weaver vote and percentage margin Garfield percentage minus Weaver percentage.)	21.19%	1,449
Chautauqua	1,321	57.21%	655	28.37%	333	14.42%	0	0.00%	666	28.84%	2,309
Cherokee	2,374	48.34%	1,681	34.23%	855	17.41%	1	0.02%	693	14.11%	4,911
Clay	1,765	66.23%	531	19.92%	369	13.85%	0	0.00%	1,234	46.30%	2,665
Cloud	2,156	69.26%	888	28.53%	65	2.09%	4	0.13%	1,268	40.73%	3,113
Coffey	1,420	57.70%	851	34.58%	190	7.72%	0	0.00%	569	23.12%	2,461
Cowley	2,630	60.09%	1,557	35.57%	190	4.34%	0	0.00%	1,073	24.51%	4,377
Crawford	1,902	51.20%	1,356	36.50%	450	12.11%	7	0.19%	546	14.70%	3,715
Davis	702	48.89%	399	27.79%	335	23.33%	0	0.00%	303	21.10%	1,436
Decatur	307	61.65%	163	32.73%	28	5.62%	0	0.00%	144	28.92%	498
Dickinson	1,954	62.39%	886	28.29%	292	9.32%	0	0.00%	1,068	34.10%	3,132
Doniphan	2,067	63.39%	1,143	35.05%	51	1.56%	0	0.00%	924	28.33%	3,261
Douglas	3,049	64.08%	1,462	30.73%	247	5.19%	0	0.00%	1,587	33.35%	4,758
Edwards	313	75.42%	102	24.58%	0	0.00%	0	0.00%	211	50.84%	415
Elk	1,274	57.44%	458	20.65%	486	21.91%	0	0.00%	788	35.53%	2,218
Ellis	680	58.93%	420	36.40%	54	4.68%	0	0.00%	260	22.53%	1,154
Ellsworth	1,077	67.65%	483	30.34%	32	2.01%	0	0.00%	594	37.31%	1,592
Ford	370	54.65%	287	42.39%	20	2.95%	0	0.00%	83	12.26%	677
Franklin	2,108	56.45%	728	19.50%	898	24.05%	0	0.00%	1,210	32.40%	3,734
Graham	494	61.14%	104	12.87%	210	25.99%	0	0.00%	284	35.15%	808
Greenwood	1,311	56.39%	667	28.69%	347	14.92%	0	0.00%	644	27.70%	2,325
Harper	546	54.06%	294	29.11%	170	16.83%	0	0.00%	252	24.95%	1,010
Harvey	1,554	68.37%	584	25.69%	135	5.94%	0	0.00%	970	42.67%	2,273
Hodgeman	176	66.17%	52	19.55%	38	14.29%	0	0.00%	124	46.62%	266
Jackson	1,504	63.46%	852	35.95%	14	0.59%	0	0.00%	652	27.51%	2,370
Jefferson	1,976	57.21%	1,397	40.45%	78	2.26%	3	0.09%	579	16.76%	3,454
Jewell	2,199	63.17%	883	25.37%	399	11.46%	0	0.00%	1,316	37.81%	3,481
Johnson	2,132	58.06%	1,180	32.14%	354	9.64%	6	0.16%	952	25.93%	3,672
Kingman	436	60.47%	200	27.74%	85	11.79%	0	0.00%	236	32.73%	721
Labette	2,720	59.09%	1,462	31.76%	420	9.12%	1	0.02%	1,258	27.33%	4,603
Leavenworth	3,186	54.29%	2,508	42.73%	175	2.98%	0	0.00%	678	11.55%	5,869
Lincoln	957	62.55%	419	27.39%	154	10.07%	0	0.00%	538	35.16%	1,530
Linn	1,990	60.12%	745	22.51%	575	17.37%	0	0.00%	1,245	37.61%	3,310
Lyon	2,398	65.34%	870	23.71%	402	10.95%	0	0.00%	1,528	41.63%	3,670
Marion	1,239	60.50%	538	26.27%	271	13.23%	0	0.00%	701	34.23%	2,048
Marshall	2,276	61.50%	998	26.97%	427	11.54%	0	0.00%	1,278	34.53%	3,701
McPherson	2,225	66.74%	564	16.92%	545	16.35%	0	0.00%	1,661	49.82%	3,334
Miami	2,010	53.06%	1,324	34.95%	454	11.99%	0	0.00%	686	18.11%	3,788
Mitchell	1,728	62.61%	797	28.88%	235	8.51%	0	0.00%	931	33.73%	2,760
Montgomery	1,776	47.17%	1,295	34.40%	694	18.43%	0	0.00%	481	12.78%	3,765
Morris	1,282	63.75%	550	27.35%	179	8.90%	0	0.00%	732	36.40%	2,011
Nemaha	1,755	65.14%	934	34.67%	5	0.19%	0	0.00%	821	30.48%	2,694
Neosho	1,471	51.08%	948	32.92%	461	16.01%	0	0.00%	523	18.16%	2,880
Ness	315	58.99%	129	24.16%	90	16.85%	0	0.00%	186	34.83%	534
Norton	761	58.72%	337	26.00%	198	15.28%	0	0.00%	424	32.72%	1,296
Osage	2,704	61.40%	907	20.59%	793	18.01%	0	0.00%	1,797	40.80%	4,404
Osborne	1,446	68.99%	589	28.10%	61	2.91%	0	0.00%	857	40.89%	2,096
Ottawa	1,443	62.74%	524	22.78%	333	14.48%	0	0.00%	919	39.96%	2,300
Pawnee	697	73.45%	235	24.76%	17	1.79%	0	0.00%	462	48.68%	949
Phillips	1,261	61.97%	553	27.17%	221	10.86%	0	0.00%	708	34.79%	2,035
Pottawatomie	2,139	60.41%	1,178	33.27%	224	6.33%	0	0.00%	961	27.14%	3,541
Pratt	196	60.12%	97	29.75%	33	10.12%	0	0.00%	99	30.37%	326
Reno	1,384	63.72%	536	24.68%	252	11.60%	0	0.00%	848	39.04%	2,172
Republic	1,875	69.78%	661	24.60%	151	5.62%	0	0.00%	1,214	45.18%	2,687
Rice	1,108	57.62%	496	25.79%	314	16.33%	5	0.26%	612	31.83%	1,923
Riley	1,484	67.21%	377	17.07%	347	15.72%	0	0.00%	1,107	50.14%	2,208
Rooks	805	54.80%	338	23.01%	326	22.19%	0	0.00%	467	31.79%	1,469
Rush	542	67.33%	238	29.57%	21	2.61%	4	0.50%	304	37.76%	805
Russell	932	68.38%	317	23.26%	114	8.36%	0	0.00%	615	45.12%	1,363
Saline	1,950	67.64%	838	29.07%	95	3.30%	0	0.00%	1,112	38.57%	2,883
Sedgwick	2,288	57.11%	1,354	33.80%	364	9.09%	0	0.00%	934	23.32%	4,006
Shawnee	4,403	72.49%	1,548	25.49%	123	2.03%	0	0.00%	2,855	47.00%	6,074
Sheridan	93	44.50%	52	24.88%	64	30.62%	0	0.00%	29	13.88%	209
Smith	1,525	62.32%	517	21.13%	405	16.55%	0	0.00%	1,008	41.19%	2,447
Stafford	530	67.77%	192	24.55%	60	7.67%	0	0.00%	338	43.22%	782
Sumner	2,073	51.55%	1,419	35.29%	529	13.16%	0	0.00%	654	16.26%	4,021
Trego	332	71.09%	107	22.91%	28	6.00%	0	0.00%	225	48.18%	467
Wabaunsee	1,279	69.97%	510	27.90%	39	2.13%	0	0.00%	769	42.07%	1,828
Washington	1,957	64.91%	827	27.43%	231	7.66%	0	0.00%	1,130	37.48%	3,015
Wilson	1,628	56.61%	721	25.07%	527	18.32%	0	0.00%	907	31.54%	2,876
Woodson	898	66.82%	437	32.51%	9	0.67%	0	0.00%	461	34.30%	1,344
Wyandotte	2,410	55.09%	1,729	39.52%	236	5.39%	0	0.00%	681	15.57%	4,375
Totals	121,549	60.40%	59,801	29.72%	19,851	9.86%	35	0.02%	61,748	30.68%	201,236

== See also ==
- United States presidential elections in Kansas
