= 1984 United States presidential election in Kansas =

- November 6, 1984

Nominee	Ronald Reagan	Walter Mondale
Party	Republican	Democratic
Home state	California	Minnesota
Running mate	George H. W. Bush	Geraldine Ferraro
Electoral vote	7	0
Popular vote	677,296	333,149
Percentage	66.27%	32.60%
County results
Reagan
50–60%
60–70%
70–80%
80–90%
Mondale
50–60%
President before election
Ronald Reagan
Republican
Elected President
Ronald Reagan
Republican

The 1984 United States presidential election in Kansas took place on November 6, 1984. All 50 states and the District of Columbia, were part of the 1984 United States presidential election. Voters chose seven electors to the Electoral College, which selected the president and vice president of the United States. Kansas was won by incumbent United States President Ronald Reagan of California, who was running against former Vice President Walter Mondale of Minnesota. Reagan ran for a second time with incumbent Vice President and former C.I.A. Director George H. W. Bush of Texas, and Mondale ran with Representative Geraldine Ferraro of New York, the first major female candidate for the vice presidency.

The presidential election of 1984 was a very partisan election for Kansas, with just under 99% of the electorate voting for either the Democratic or Republican parties, though several parties appeared on the ballot. In typical form for the time, nearly every county in Kansas voted in majority for the Republican candidate, a particularly strong turn out even in this typically conservative-leaning state. The only exception to this trend was Kansas City's Wyandotte County, which voted primarily Democratic.

In this election, Kansas voted about 7 points more Republican than the national average. Reagan won the election in Kansas in a 34-point landslide. Kansas also continued its age-old trend of voting in par with its sister Great Plains States (North Dakota, South Dakota, and Nebraska), a trend that has not been broken in any presidential election since 1920.

== Campaign ==
The 2nd presidential debate for the general election was held on October 21, 1984 at the Music Hall in Kansas City with Reagan and Mondale both participating. The debate was sponsored by the League of Women Voters and moderated by Edwin Newman, a reporter at NBC News.

== Results ==
1984 United States presidential election in Kansas
Party	Candidate	Votes	Percentage	Electoral votes
Republican	Ronald Reagan (incumbent)	677,296	66.27%	7
Democratic	Walter Mondale	333,149	32.60%	0
America First	Bob Richards	3,564	0.35%	0
Libertarian	David Bergland	3,329	0.33%	0
New Alliance Party	Dennis Serrette	2,544	0.25%	0
Prohibition	Earl Dodge	2,109	0.21%	0
Totals		1,021,991	100.0%	7

=== Results by county ===
County	Ronald Reagan Republican		Walter Mondale Democratic		Various candidates Other parties		Margin		Total votes cast
County	#	%	#	%	#	%	#	%	Total votes cast
Allen	4,267	69.76%	1,778	29.07%	72	1.18%	2,489	40.69%	6,117
Anderson	2,462	67.14%	1,155	31.50%	50	1.36%	1,307	35.64%	3,667
Atchison	4,537	62.54%	2,641	36.40%	77	1.06%	1,896	26.14%	7,255
Barber	2,112	71.84%	806	27.41%	22	0.75%	1,306	44.43%	2,940
Barton	10,232	75.58%	3,111	22.98%	195	1.44%	7,121	52.60%	13,538
Bourbon	4,858	68.40%	2,175	30.63%	69	0.97%	2,683	37.77%	7,102
Brown	3,894	73.97%	1,303	24.75%	67	1.27%	2,591	49.22%	5,264
Butler	12,976	66.33%	6,371	32.56%	217	1.11%	6,605	33.77%	19,564
Chase	1,162	74.01%	393	25.03%	15	0.96%	769	48.98%	1,570
Chautauqua	1,688	76.55%	497	22.54%	20	0.91%	1,191	54.01%	2,205
Cherokee	5,801	60.72%	3,663	38.34%	89	0.93%	2,138	22.38%	9,553
Cheyenne	1,442	79.06%	356	19.52%	26	1.43%	1,086	59.54%	1,824
Clark	1,075	75.39%	324	22.72%	27	1.89%	751	52.67%	1,426
Clay	3,559	78.76%	919	20.34%	41	0.91%	2,640	58.42%	4,519
Cloud	3,860	66.43%	1,880	32.35%	71	1.22%	1,980	34.08%	5,811
Coffey	3,063	74.00%	1,037	25.05%	39	0.94%	2,026	48.95%	4,139
Comanche	993	76.80%	285	22.04%	15	1.16%	708	54.76%	1,293
Cowley	10,008	64.99%	5,193	33.72%	198	1.29%	4,815	31.27%	15,399
Crawford	9,518	58.10%	6,722	41.04%	141	0.86%	2,796	17.06%	16,381
Decatur	1,770	78.15%	467	20.62%	28	1.24%	1,303	57.53%	2,265
Dickinson	6,487	73.96%	2,168	24.72%	116	1.32%	4,319	49.24%	8,771
Doniphan	2,818	73.77%	962	25.18%	40	1.05%	1,856	48.59%	3,820
Douglas	18,975	58.87%	12,880	39.96%	378	1.17%	6,095	18.91%	32,233
Edwards	1,352	67.53%	606	30.27%	44	2.20%	746	37.26%	2,002
Elk	1,301	72.89%	452	25.32%	32	1.79%	849	47.57%	1,785
Ellis	7,509	67.65%	3,457	31.15%	133	1.20%	4,052	36.50%	11,099
Ellsworth	2,353	71.35%	905	27.44%	40	1.21%	1,448	43.91%	3,298
Finney	6,938	73.08%	2,458	25.89%	98	1.03%	4,480	47.19%	9,494
Ford	6,935	69.72%	2,914	29.30%	98	0.99%	4,021	40.42%	9,947
Franklin	6,284	70.61%	2,523	28.35%	92	1.03%	3,761	42.26%	8,899
Geary	4,464	65.44%	2,296	33.66%	61	0.89%	2,168	31.78%	6,821
Gove	1,310	73.43%	426	23.88%	48	2.69%	884	49.55%	1,784
Graham	1,423	74.00%	480	24.96%	20	1.04%	943	49.04%	1,923
Grant	2,043	76.26%	615	22.96%	21	0.78%	1,428	53.30%	2,679
Gray	1,580	74.32%	514	24.18%	32	1.51%	1,066	50.14%	2,126
Greeley	699	73.27%	227	23.79%	28	2.94%	472	49.48%	954
Greenwood	2,901	70.45%	1,173	28.48%	44	1.07%	1,728	41.97%	4,118
Hamilton	1,037	70.64%	408	27.79%	23	1.57%	629	42.85%	1,468
Harper	2,521	73.09%	893	25.89%	35	1.01%	1,628	47.20%	3,449
Harvey	8,507	64.06%	4,599	34.63%	174	1.31%	3,908	29.43%	13,280
Haskell	1,152	79.34%	283	19.49%	17	1.17%	869	59.85%	1,452
Hodgeman	939	74.17%	306	24.17%	21	1.66%	633	50.00%	1,266
Jackson	3,466	66.92%	1,667	32.19%	46	0.89%	1,799	34.73%	5,179
Jefferson	4,524	68.93%	1,990	30.32%	49	0.75%	2,534	38.61%	6,563
Jewell	1,992	76.50%	583	22.39%	29	1.11%	1,409	54.11%	2,604
Johnson	101,987	72.39%	38,019	26.99%	876	0.62%	63,968	45.40%	140,882
Kearny	1,214	78.42%	321	20.74%	13	0.84%	893	57.68%	1,548
Kingman	2,826	72.04%	1,047	26.69%	50	1.27%	1,779	45.35%	3,923
Kiowa	1,537	79.51%	361	18.68%	35	1.81%	1,176	60.83%	1,933
Labette	6,542	63.76%	3,631	35.39%	87	0.85%	2,911	28.37%	10,260
Lane	1,008	77.18%	282	21.59%	16	1.23%	726	55.59%	1,306
Leavenworth	11,194	62.29%	6,604	36.75%	172	0.96%	4,590	25.54%	17,970
Lincoln	1,723	75.14%	551	24.03%	19	0.83%	1,172	51.11%	2,293
Linn	2,795	70.33%	1,152	28.99%	27	0.68%	1,643	41.34%	3,974
Logan	1,235	77.04%	331	20.65%	37	2.31%	904	56.39%	1,603
Lyon	9,796	69.37%	4,188	29.66%	137	0.97%	5,608	39.71%	14,121
McPherson	8,630	71.89%	3,185	26.53%	189	1.57%	5,445	45.36%	12,004
Marion	4,407	72.06%	1,632	26.68%	77	1.26%	2,775	45.38%	6,116
Marshall	4,098	68.49%	1,813	30.30%	72	1.20%	2,285	38.19%	5,983
Meade	1,804	77.16%	491	21.00%	43	1.84%	1,313	56.16%	2,338
Miami	5,877	65.04%	3,076	34.04%	83	0.92%	2,801	31.00%	9,036
Mitchell	3,036	75.98%	919	23.00%	41	1.03%	2,117	52.98%	3,996
Montgomery	12,023	70.20%	4,933	28.80%	171	1.00%	7,090	41.40%	17,127
Morris	2,240	72.19%	820	26.43%	43	1.39%	1,420	45.76%	3,103
Morton	1,533	81.80%	322	17.18%	19	1.01%	1,211	64.62%	1,874
Nemaha	3,653	66.60%	1,761	32.11%	71	1.29%	1,892	34.49%	5,485
Neosho	4,968	64.11%	2,679	34.57%	102	1.32%	2,289	29.54%	7,749
Ness	1,779	75.32%	540	22.86%	43	1.82%	1,239	52.46%	2,362
Norton	2,515	79.19%	611	19.24%	50	1.57%	1,904	59.95%	3,176
Osage	4,288	66.55%	2,072	32.16%	83	1.29%	2,216	34.39%	6,443
Osborne	2,171	74.63%	686	23.58%	52	1.79%	1,485	51.05%	2,909
Ottawa	2,345	75.74%	699	22.58%	52	1.68%	1,646	53.16%	3,096
Pawnee	2,570	68.90%	1,092	29.28%	68	1.82%	1,478	39.62%	3,730
Phillips	2,813	80.90%	626	18.00%	38	1.09%	2,187	62.90%	3,477
Pottawatomie	4,598	71.09%	1,798	27.80%	72	1.11%	2,800	43.29%	6,468
Pratt	3,244	71.31%	1,255	27.59%	50	1.10%	1,989	43.72%	4,549
Rawlins	1,625	78.05%	412	19.79%	45	2.16%	1,213	58.26%	2,082
Reno	16,568	63.34%	9,229	35.28%	362	1.38%	7,339	28.06%	26,159
Republic	3,009	76.49%	887	22.55%	38	0.97%	2,122	53.94%	3,934
Rice	3,598	68.68%	1,559	29.76%	82	1.57%	2,039	38.92%	5,239
Riley	11,308	64.77%	5,975	34.22%	175	1.00%	5,333	30.55%	17,458
Rooks	2,604	77.75%	699	20.87%	46	1.37%	1,905	56.88%	3,349
Rush	1,758	69.49%	718	28.38%	54	2.13%	1,040	41.11%	2,530
Russell	3,673	76.99%	1,055	22.11%	43	0.90%	2,618	54.88%	4,771
Saline	15,244	69.41%	6,526	29.72%	191	0.87%	8,718	39.69%	21,961
Scott	2,017	81.13%	427	17.18%	42	1.69%	1,590	63.95%	2,486
Sedgwick	95,874	62.53%	55,263	36.05%	2,178	1.42%	40,611	26.48%	153,315
Seward	5,222	80.54%	1,198	18.48%	64	0.99%	4,024	62.06%	6,484
Shawnee	43,465	61.57%	26,338	37.31%	786	1.11%	17,127	24.26%	70,589
Sheridan	1,274	73.86%	419	24.29%	32	1.86%	855	49.57%	1,725
Sherman	2,702	78.02%	714	20.62%	47	1.36%	1,988	57.40%	3,463
Smith	2,332	75.74%	684	22.22%	63	2.05%	1,648	53.52%	3,079
Stafford	2,062	69.71%	844	28.53%	52	1.76%	1,218	41.18%	2,958
Stanton	783	76.61%	205	20.06%	34	3.33%	578	56.55%	1,022
Stevens	1,863	82.03%	386	17.00%	22	0.97%	1,477	65.03%	2,271
Sumner	6,942	64.32%	3,708	34.36%	143	1.32%	3,234	29.96%	10,793
Thomas	3,107	76.70%	887	21.90%	57	1.41%	2,220	54.80%	4,051
Trego	1,491	70.40%	598	28.23%	29	1.37%	893	42.17%	2,118
Wabaunsee	2,276	72.72%	805	25.72%	49	1.57%	1,471	47.00%	3,130
Wallace	838	82.97%	152	15.05%	20	1.98%	686	67.92%	1,010
Washington	2,979	75.69%	889	22.59%	68	1.73%	2,090	53.10%	3,936
Wichita	916	78.90%	232	19.98%	13	1.12%	684	58.92%	1,161
Wilson	3,663	72.23%	1,344	26.50%	64	1.26%	2,319	45.73%	5,071
Woodson	1,408	69.36%	596	29.36%	26	1.28%	812	40.00%	2,030
Wyandotte	27,459	42.81%	36,042	56.20%	635	0.99%	-8,583	-13.39%	64,136
Totals	677,296	66.27%	333,149	32.60%	11,546	1.13%	344,147	33.67%	1,021,991

== See also ==
- United States presidential elections in Kansas
- Presidency of Ronald Reagan
