= 1872 United States presidential election in Kansas =

- November 5, 1872
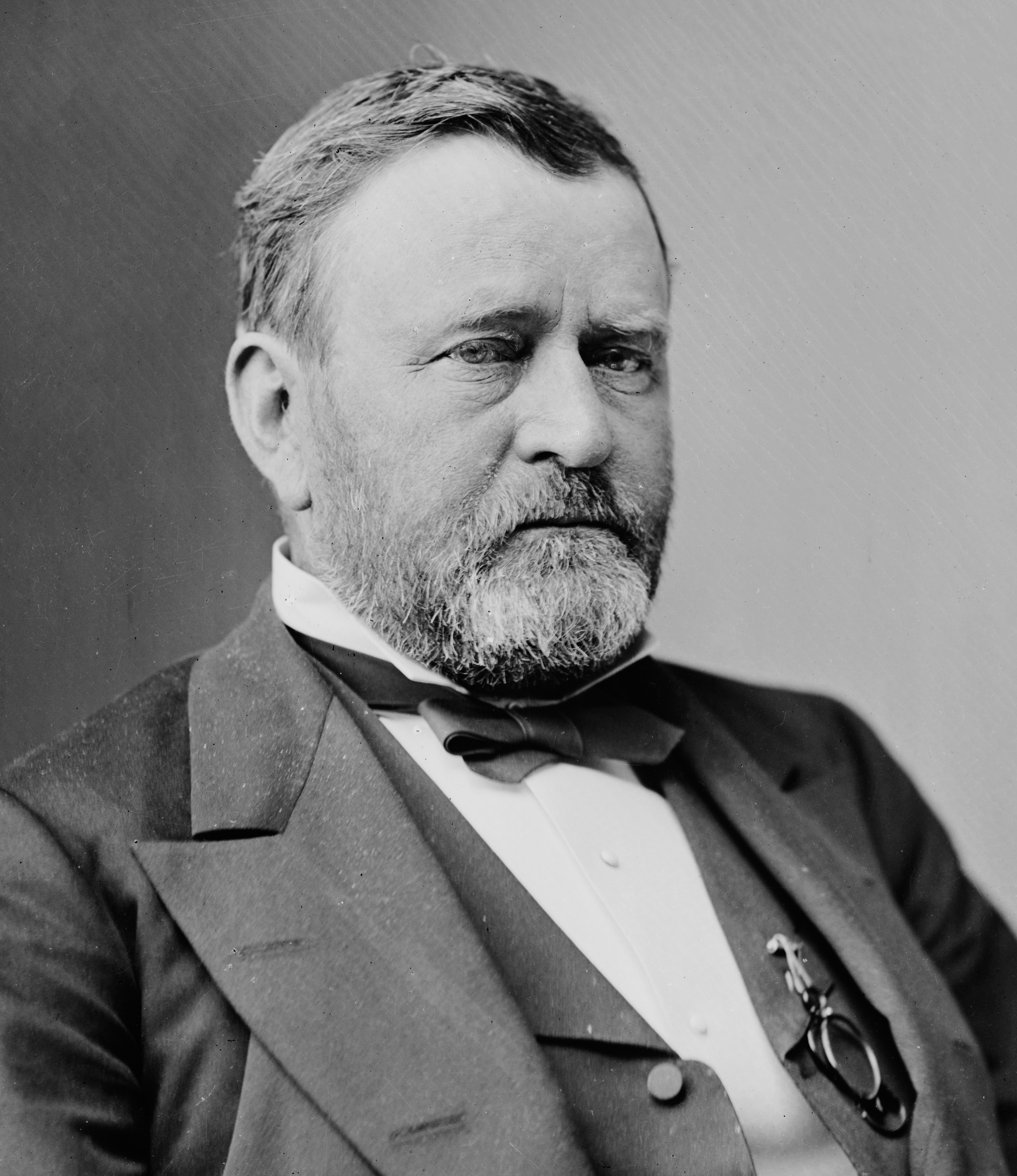

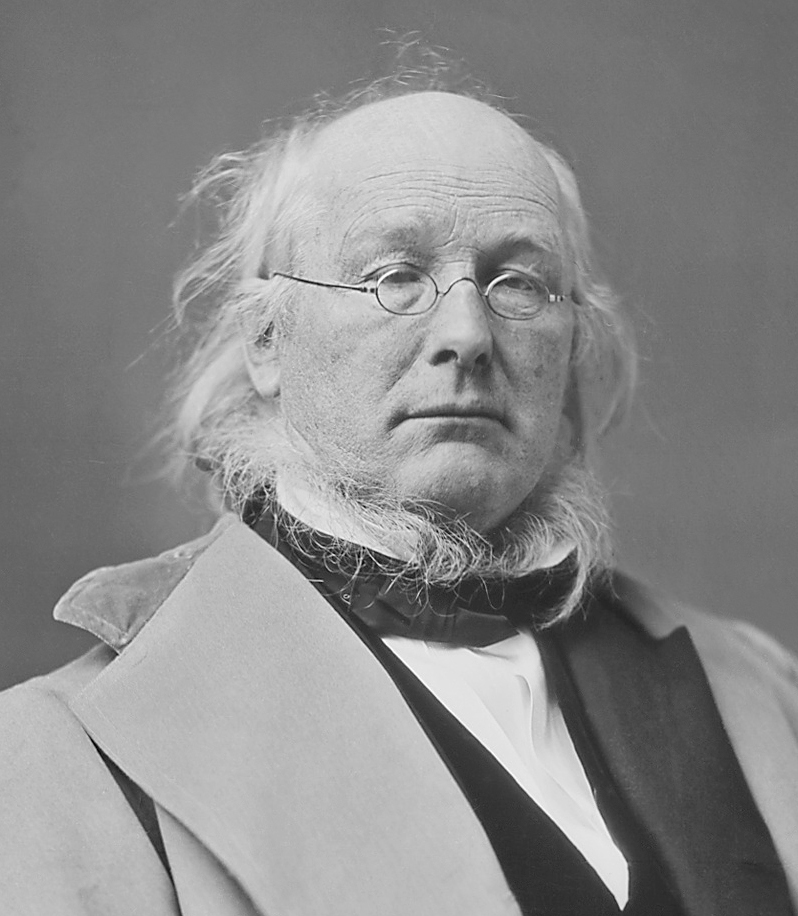
Nominee	Ulysses S. Grant	Horace Greeley
Party	Republican	Liberal Republican
Home state	Illinois	New York
Running mate	Henry Wilson	Benjamin G. Brown
Electoral vote	5	0
Popular vote	66,805	32,970
Percentage	66.46%	32.80%
County results
Grant
50–60%
60–70%
70–80%
80–90%
90–100%
Greeley
50–60%
60–70%
President before election
Ulysses S. Grant
Republican
Elected President
Ulysses S. Grant
Republican

The 1872 United States presidential election in Kansas took place on November 5, 1872, as part of the 1872 United States presidential election. Voters chose five representatives, or electors to the Electoral College, who voted for president and vice president.

Kansas voted for the Republican candidate, Ulysses S. Grant, over Liberal Republican candidate Horace Greeley. Grant won Kansas by a margin of 33.66%.

== Results ==
1872 United States presidential election in Kansas
Party	Candidate	Running mate	Popular vote		Electoral vote	
Party	Candidate	Running mate	Count	%	Count	%
Republican	Ulysses S. Grant of Illinois	Henry Wilson of Massachusetts	66,805	66.46%	5	100.00%
Liberal Republican	Horace Greely of New York	Benjamin Gratz Brown of Missouri	32,970	32.80%	0	0.00%
Write-ins	N/A	N/A	581	0.58%	0	0.00%
Straight-Out Democratic	Charles O'Conor	John Quincy Adams II	156	0.16%	0	0.00%
Total			100,512	100.00%	5	100.00%

== See also ==
- United States presidential elections in Kansas
