= 1884 United States presidential election in Kansas =

- November 4, 1884
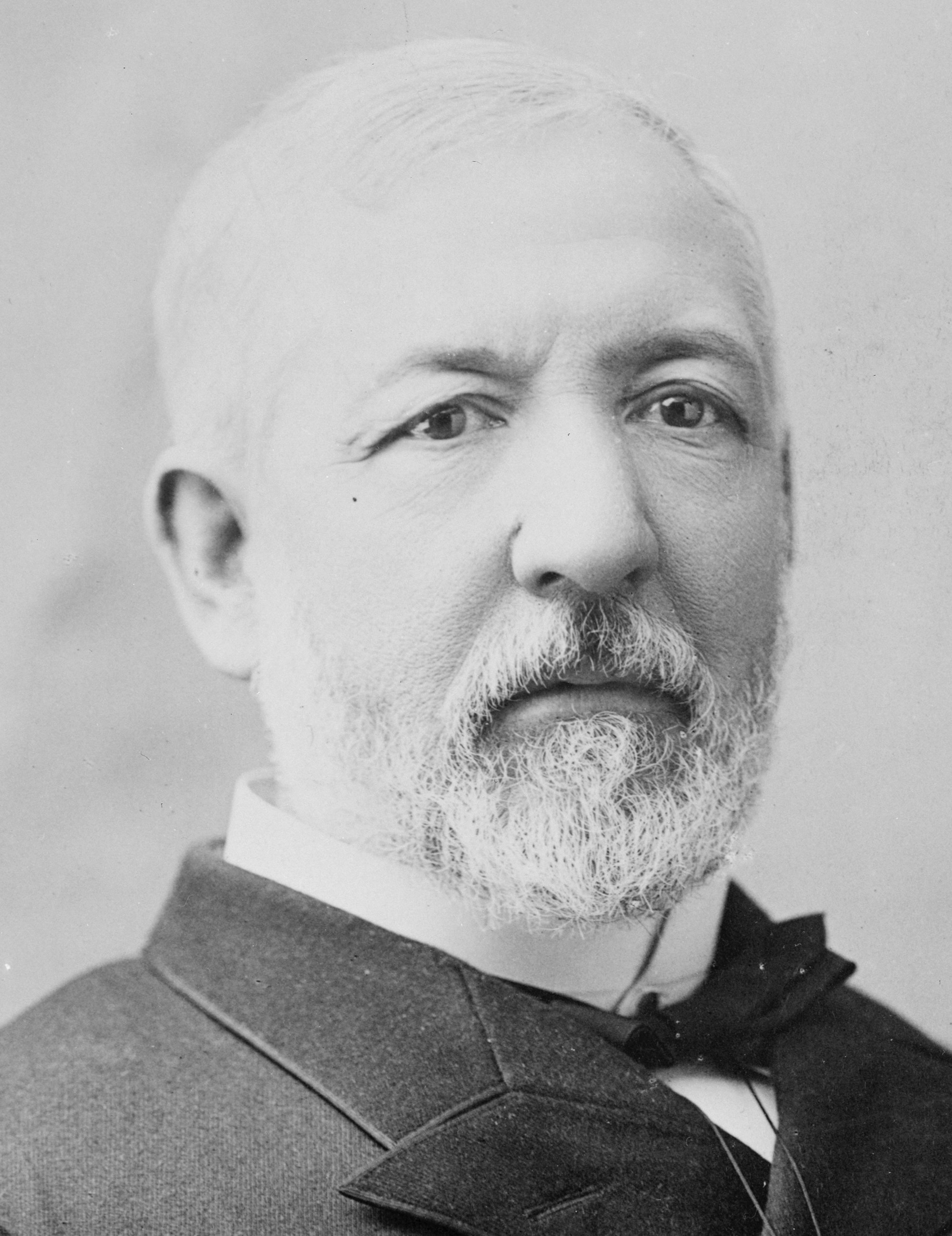

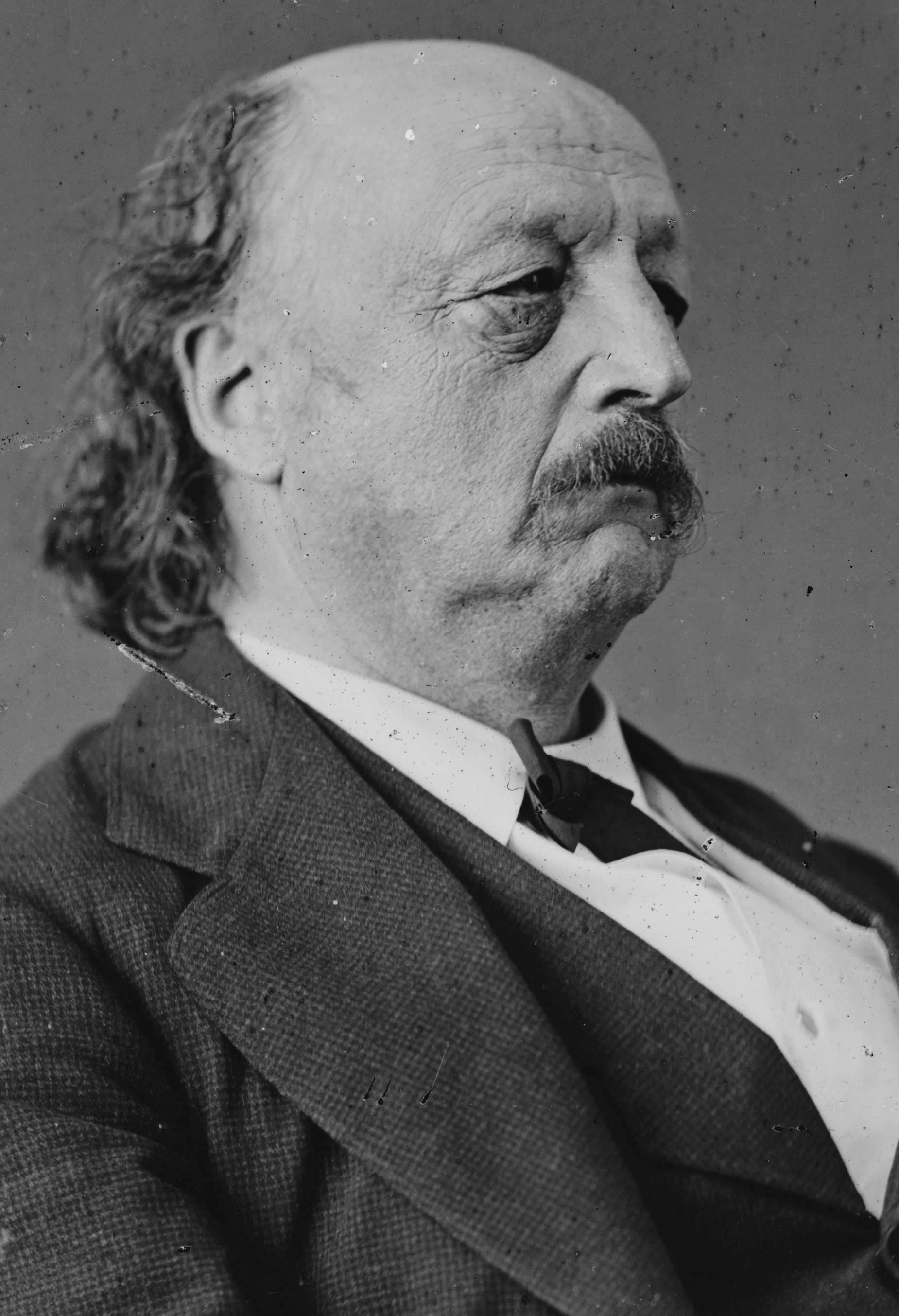
Nominee	James G. Blaine	Grover Cleveland	Benjamin Butler
Party	Republican	Democratic	Greenback
Home state	Maine	New York	Massachusetts
Running mate	John A. Logan	Thomas A. Hendricks	Absolom Madden West
Electoral vote	9	0	0
Popular vote	154,406	90,132	16,346
Percentage	58.08%	33.90%	6.15%
County results
Blaine
40–50%
50–60%
60–70%
70–80%
Cleveland
50–60%
President before election
Chester A. Arthur
Republican
Elected President
Grover Cleveland
Democratic

The 1884 Presidential Election in Kansas took place on November 4, 1884, as part of the 1884 United States presidential election. Voters chose nine representatives, or electors to the Electoral College, who voted for president and vice president.

Kansas was won by Republican nominee, James G. Blaine, over the Democratic nominee, Grover Cleveland. Blaine won the state by a margin of 24.18%.

With 58.08 percent of the popular vote, Kansas would prove to be Blaine's third strongest victory in terms of percentage in the popular vote after Vermont and Minnesota. The state would also prove to be Greenback Party candidate Benjamin Butler's second strongest state after Massachusetts.

== Results ==
1884 United States presidential election in Kansas
Party	Candidate	Running mate	Popular vote		Electoral vote	
Party	Candidate	Running mate	Count	%	Count	%
Republican	James Gillespie Blaine of Maine	John Alexander Logan of Illinois	154,406	58.08%	9	100.00%
Democratic	Grover Cleveland of New York	Thomas Andrews Hendricks of Indiana	90,132	33.90%	0	0.00%
Greenback	Benjamin Butler of Massachusetts	Absolom Madden West of Mississippi	16,346	6.15%	0	0.00%
Prohibition	John Pierce St. John of Kansas	William Daniel of Maryland	4,495	1.69%	0	0.00%
N/A	Others	Others	469	0.18%	0	0.00%
Total			265,848	100.00%	9	100.00%

=== Results by county ===
1884 United States presidential election in Kansas by county
County	James Gillespie Blaine Republican		Stephen Grover Cleveland Democratic		Various candidates Other parties		Margin		Total votes cast
County	#	%	#	%	#	%	#	%	Total votes cast
Allen	1,956	61.72%	1,120	35.34%	93	2.93%	836	26.38%	3,169
Anderson	1,671	56.91%	825	28.10%	440	14.99%	846	28.81%	2,936
Atchison	3,306	54.96%	2,604	43.29%	105	1.75%	702	11.67%	6,015
Barber	919	52.60%	739	42.30%	89	5.09%	180	10.30%	1,747
Barton	1,068	48.68%	1,047	47.72%	79	3.60%	21	0.96%	2,194
Bourbon	2,974	60.48%	1,671	33.98%	272	5.53%	1,303	26.50%	4,917
Brown	2,339	61.25%	1,385	36.27%	95	2.49%	954	24.98%	3,819
Butler	3,179	58.42%	1,799	33.06%	464	8.53%	1,380	25.36%	5,442
Chase	1,012	54.61%	695	37.51%	146	7.88%	317	17.11%	1,853
Chautauqua	1,755	55.38%	1,055	33.29%	359	11.33%	700	22.09%	3,169
Cherokee	2,602	46.19%	1,940	34.44%	1,091	19.37%	662	11.75%	5,633
Clay	2,170	61.11%	978	27.54%	403	11.35%	1,192	33.57%	3,551
Cloud	2,689	64.67%	1,155	27.78%	314	7.55%	1,534	36.89%	4,158
Coffey	1,988	56.14%	1,258	35.53%	295	8.33%	730	20.62%	3,541
Cowley	3,767	57.74%	2,332	35.74%	425	6.51%	1,435	22.00%	6,524
Crawford	3,087	55.99%	2,123	38.51%	303	5.50%	964	17.49%	5,513
Davis	843	50.81%	602	36.29%	214	12.90%	241	14.53%	1,659
Decatur	477	67.18%	222	31.27%	11	1.55%	255	35.92%	710
Dickinson	2,606	55.92%	1,587	34.06%	467	10.02%	1,019	21.87%	4,660
Doniphan	2,178	65.72%	1,135	34.25%	1	0.03%	1,043	31.47%	3,314
Douglas	3,366	60.85%	1,676	30.30%	490	8.86%	1,690	30.55%	5,532
Edwards	452	55.80%	313	38.64%	45	5.56%	139	17.16%	810
Elk	1,802	59.53%	925	30.56%	300	9.91%	877	28.97%	3,027
Ellis	475	44.10%	571	53.02%	31	2.88%	-96	-8.91%	1,077
Ellsworth	1,079	57.55%	752	40.11%	44	2.35%	327	17.44%	1,875
Finney	222	57.07%	163	41.90%	4	1.03%	59	15.17%	389
Ford	673	51.85%	544	41.91%	81	6.24%	129	9.94%	1,298
Franklin	2,360	52.86%	997	22.33%	1,108	24.82%	1,363	30.53%	4,465
Graham	398	68.62%	109	18.79%	73	12.59%	289	49.83%	580
Greenwood	1,980	58.75%	1,047	31.07%	343	10.18%	933	27.69%	3,370
Harper	1,621	55.19%	1,006	34.25%	310	10.55%	615	20.94%	2,937
Harvey	2,143	60.32%	1,172	32.99%	238	6.70%	971	27.33%	3,553
Hodgeman	262	62.53%	124	29.59%	33	7.88%	138	32.94%	419
Jackson	1,843	60.43%	1,132	37.11%	75	2.46%	711	23.31%	3,050
Jefferson	2,250	56.50%	1,655	41.56%	77	1.93%	595	14.94%	3,982
Jewell	2,394	59.35%	1,000	24.79%	640	15.87%	1,394	34.56%	4,034
Johnson	2,110	52.87%	1,392	34.88%	489	12.25%	718	17.99%	3,991
Kingman	1,344	57.26%	911	38.82%	92	3.92%	433	18.45%	2,347
Labette	3,475	57.59%	2,094	34.70%	465	7.71%	1,381	22.89%	6,034
Leavenworth	3,595	49.58%	3,487	48.09%	169	2.33%	108	1.49%	7,251
Lincoln	996	59.07%	472	28.00%	218	12.93%	524	31.08%	1,686
Linn	2,232	57.27%	1,043	26.76%	622	15.96%	1,189	30.51%	3,897
Lyon	3,076	61.53%	1,519	30.39%	404	8.08%	1,557	31.15%	4,999
Marion	1,812	61.82%	1,037	35.38%	82	2.80%	775	26.44%	2,931
Marshall	2,676	54.91%	1,891	38.81%	306	6.28%	785	16.11%	4,873
McPherson	2,597	63.47%	1,004	24.54%	491	12.00%	1,593	38.93%	4,092
Miami	2,047	48.99%	1,688	40.40%	443	10.60%	359	8.59%	4,178
Mitchell	1,790	61.01%	840	28.63%	304	10.36%	950	32.38%	2,934
Montgomery	3,049	53.85%	2,180	38.50%	433	7.65%	869	15.35%	5,662
Morris	1,522	62.40%	777	31.86%	140	5.74%	745	30.55%	2,439
Nemaha	2,253	56.85%	1,586	40.02%	124	3.13%	667	16.83%	3,963
Neosho	2,114	52.06%	1,536	37.82%	411	10.12%	578	14.23%	4,061
Ness	392	59.39%	192	29.09%	76	11.52%	200	30.30%	660
Norton	764	62.42%	307	25.08%	153	12.50%	457	37.34%	1,224
Osage	3,267	59.82%	1,261	23.09%	933	17.08%	2,006	36.73%	5,461
Osborne	1,611	66.87%	642	26.65%	156	6.48%	969	40.22%	2,409
Ottawa	1,620	58.06%	861	30.86%	309	11.08%	759	27.20%	2,790
Pawnee	762	69.15%	302	27.40%	38	3.45%	460	41.74%	1,102
Phillips	1,056	55.67%	469	24.72%	372	19.61%	587	30.94%	1,897
Pottawatomie	2,398	56.13%	1,693	39.63%	181	4.24%	705	16.50%	4,272
Pratt	768	57.31%	463	34.55%	109	8.13%	305	22.76%	1,340
Rawlins	197	54.27%	165	45.45%	1	0.28%	32	8.82%	363
Reno	2,083	59.91%	1,170	33.65%	224	6.44%	913	26.26%	3,477
Republic	2,392	67.48%	1,015	28.63%	138	3.89%	1,377	38.84%	3,545
Rice	1,611	58.50%	906	32.90%	237	8.61%	705	25.60%	2,754
Riley	1,686	64.33%	644	24.57%	291	11.10%	1,042	39.76%	2,621
Rooks	1,003	62.14%	403	24.97%	208	12.89%	600	37.17%	1,614
Rush	490	61.79%	303	38.21%	0	0.00%	187	23.58%	793
Russell	767	60.44%	404	31.84%	98	7.72%	363	28.61%	1,269
Saline	2,384	67.44%	1,053	29.79%	98	2.77%	1,331	37.65%	3,535
Sedgwick	3,464	53.56%	2,467	38.14%	537	8.30%	997	15.41%	6,468
Shawnee	5,987	68.41%	2,482	28.36%	283	3.23%	3,505	40.05%	8,752
Sheridan	88	61.11%	48	33.33%	8	5.56%	40	27.78%	144
Smith	1,704	59.13%	685	23.77%	493	17.11%	1,019	35.36%	2,882
Stafford	737	64.09%	276	24.00%	137	11.91%	461	40.09%	1,150
Sumner	3,489	53.04%	2,548	38.74%	541	8.22%	941	14.31%	6,578
Trego	409	71.63%	139	24.34%	23	4.03%	270	47.29%	571
Wabaunsee	1,538	64.46%	799	33.49%	49	2.05%	739	30.97%	2,386
Washington	2,745	63.90%	1,390	32.36%	161	3.75%	1,355	31.54%	4,296
Wilson	2,026	60.71%	1,145	34.31%	166	4.97%	881	26.40%	3,337
Woodson	1,142	58.18%	635	32.35%	186	9.48%	507	25.83%	1,963
Wyandotte	3,232	56.33%	2,301	40.10%	205	3.57%	931	16.23%	5,738
Totals	154,406	58.12%	90,083	33.91%	21,162	7.97%	64,323	24.21%	265,651

== See also ==
- United States presidential elections in Kansas
