= Big Bow Township, Kansas =

Township in Stanton County, Kansas, U.S.

Big Bow Township
- Township
- Location within Stanton County
- Coordinates: 37.555164°N 101.608296°W
- Country: United States
- State: Kansas
- County: Stanton

Area
  - Total: 215.693 sq mi (558.64 km^{2})
  - Land: 215.672 sq mi (558.59 km^{2})
  - Water: 0.021 sq mi (0.054 km^{2}) 0.01%

Population (2020)
  - Total: 213
  - Density: 0.988/sq mi (0.381/km^{2})
- Time zone: UTC-6 (CST)
  - Summer (DST): UTC-5 (CDT)
- Area code: 620
- GNIS feature ID: 485095

Big Bow Township is a township in Stanton County, Kansas, United States. As of the 2020 census, its population was 213.

== Geography ==
Big Bow Township covers an area of 215.693 square miles (558.64 square kilometers). Bear Creek flows through it.

=== Communities ===
- Big Bow
- Julian

=== Adjacent townships ===
Lamont Township, Hamilton County
		north	northeast	Kendall Township, Kearny County
Stanton Township, Stanton County	west	self	east	Sherman Township, Grant County; Sullivan Township, Grant County
		south	southeast	Harmony Township, Stevens County
Richfield Township, Morton County

== Transportation ==
=== Major highways ===
- US-160

== Demographics ==
As of the 2020 census, there were 213 people and 67 households residing in the township. The population density was 0.988 people per square mile (0.381 people/km^{2}). There were 67 housing units. The racial makeup of the township was 83.6% White, 3.8% Black or African American, 2.8% Native American, 0.5% Asian, 1.9% from some other race, and 7.5% from two or more races. Hispanics or Latinos of any race were 14.1% of the population.

There were 67 households: 52.2% were married couples living together, 31.3% were a male householder with no spouse present, and 11.9% were a female householder with no spouse present. The average family size was 3.53 people. 35.6% of people in the township older than 24 had a college degree, and the township had an employment rate of 26.2%.
