= Manter Township, Kansas =

Township in Stanton County, Kansas, U.S.

Manter Township
- Township
- Location within Stanton County
- Coordinates: 37.570373°N 101.951136°W
- Country: United States
- State: Kansas
- County: Stanton

Area
  - Total: 249.913 sq mi (647.27 km^{2})
  - Land: 249.906 sq mi (647.25 km^{2})
  - Water: 0.007 sq mi (0.018 km^{2}) 0%

Population (2020)
  - Total: 252
  - Density: 1.01/sq mi (0.389/km^{2})
- Time zone: UTC-6 (CST)
  - Summer (DST): UTC-5 (CDT)
- Area code: 620
- GNIS feature ID: 485081

Manter Township is a township in Stanton County, Kansas, United States. As of the 2020 census, its population was 252.

== Geography ==
Big Bow Township covers an area of 249.913 square miles (647.27 square kilometers).

=== Communities ===
- Manter
- Saunders

=== Adjacent townships ===
Bear Creek Township, Hamilton County
Prowers County, Colorado	northwest	north
Baca County, Colorado	west	self	east	Stanton Township, Stanton County
		south	southeast	Richfield Township, Morton County
Westola Township, Morton County

== Transportation ==
=== Major highways ===
- US-160

== Demographics ==
As of the 2020 census, there were 252 people and 130 households residing in the township. The population density was 1.01 people per square mile (0.39 people/km^{2}). There were 171 housing units. The racial makeup of the township was 82.9% White, 2.4% Native American, 0.4% Pacific Islander, 1.2% from some other race, and 13.1% from two or more races. Hispanics or Latinos of any race were 19.4% of the population.

There were 130 households: 41.5% were married couples living together, 33.1% were a male householder with no spouse present, and 25.4% were a female householder with no spouse present. The average family size was 2.24 people. 34.0% of people in the township older than 24 had a college degree, and the township had an employment rate of 45.0%.
