= Big Bow =

Big Bow may refer to:

- Big Bow, Kansas
- Big Bow (chief) (1833–?), Kiowa war chief
