= 1908 United States presidential election in Kansas =

- November 3, 1908

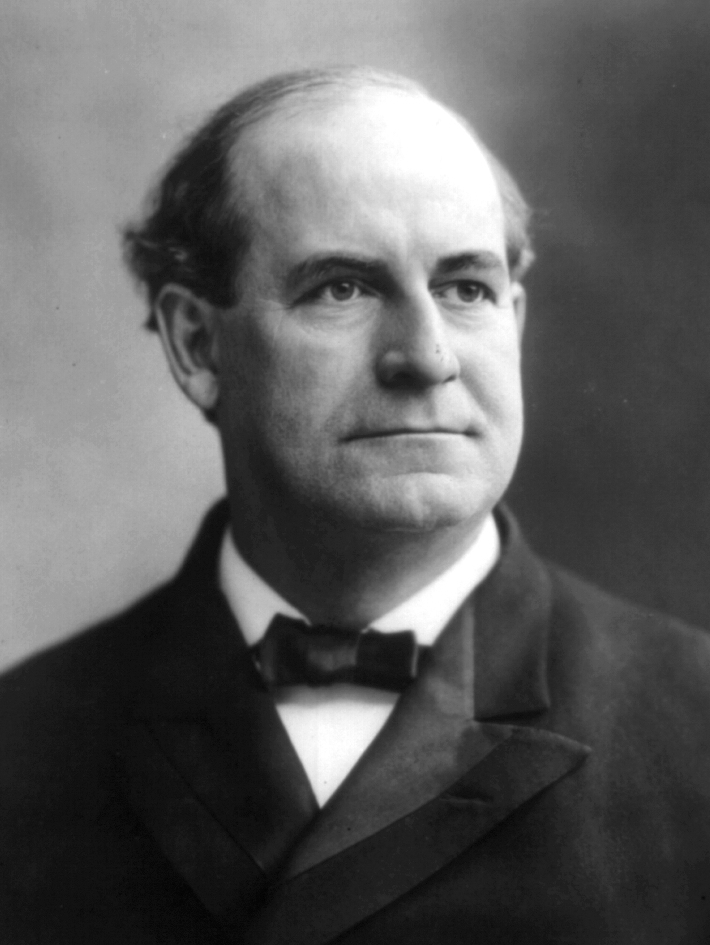
Nominee	William Howard Taft	William Jennings Bryan
Party	Republican	Democratic
Home state	Ohio	Nebraska
Running mate	James S. Sherman	John W. Kern
Electoral vote	10	0
Popular vote	197,216	161,209
Percentage	52.46%	42.88%
County results
Taft
40–50%
50–60%
60–70%
Bryan
40–50%
50–60%
60–70%
President before election
Theodore Roosevelt
Republican
Elected President
William Howard Taft
Republican

The 1908 United States presidential election in Kansas was held on November 3, 1908, as part of the 1908 United States presidential election. Kansas voters chose ten electors to the Electoral College, who voted for president and vice president.

In its first thirty years as a state Kansas had been powerfully Republican, but with the Populist movement and major agricultural crises the state turned to James B. Weaver in 1892 and William Jennings Bryan in 1896; however, President William McKinley won a rematch with Bryan in 1900. With the return to a conservative “Gold Democrat” candidate in 1904, Kansas reverted to rock-solid Republican as Alton B. Parker failed to carry a single county in the state against Theodore Roosevelt.

Bryan was nominated as the Democratic candidate for president for the third time. However, by October, most predictions suggested that Bryan would not win over the voters who had deserted Parker, and be unsuccessful in his attempt to emulate his “Commoner” success of 1896.

On election day, Republican candidate William Howard Taft carried Kansas by 9.60 points, an improvement of over 2 points upon McKinley's 1900 result and of 13.26 points upon the Republican result from 1896, despite Bryan campaigning in the state at the beginning of November. His underperformance was in part attributed to the fact that Kansas’ local Republicans supported Taft's plan to guarantee bank deposits for all customers through the state treasurer.

As of 2024, this along with 1892 is the 2nd and last time that Nebraska has voted for a different presidential candidate than neighboring Kansas.

== Results ==
Presidential Candidate	Running Mate	Party	Electoral Vote (EV)	Popular Vote (PV)	
William Howard Taft of Ohio	James S. Sherman	Republican	10	197,216	52.46%
William Jennings Bryan	John W. Kern	Democratic	0	161,209	42.88%
Eugene V. Debs	Ben Hanford	Socialist	0	12,420	3.30%
Eugene W. Chafin	Aaron S. Watkins	Prohibition	0	5,033	1.34%
Thomas L. Hisgen	John Temple Graves	Independent	0	68	0.02%

=== Results by county ===
1908 United States presidential election in Kansas by county
County	William Howard Taft Republican		William Jennings Bryan Democratic		Eugene Victor Debs Social Democratic		Eugene Wilder Chafin Prohibition		Thomas Louis Higsen Independent		Margin		Total votes cast
County	#	%	#	%	#	%	#	%	#	%	#	%	Total votes cast
Allen	3,283	53.80%	2,579	42.26%	204	3.34%	36	0.59%	0	0.00%	704	11.54%	6,102
Anderson	1,722	51.25%	1,512	45.00%	65	1.93%	61	1.82%	0	0.00%	210	6.25%	3,360
Atchison	3,244	54.94%	2,593	43.91%	48	0.81%	18	0.30%	2	0.03%	651	11.02%	5,905
Barber	1,097	53.72%	864	42.31%	45	2.20%	36	1.76%	0	0.00%	233	11.41%	2,042
Barton	1,729	44.83%	2,004	51.96%	100	2.59%	24	0.62%	0	0.00%	-275	-7.13%	3,857
Bourbon	2,695	47.83%	2,686	47.67%	211	3.75%	42	0.75%	0	0.00%	9	0.16%	5,634
Brown	2,778	56.31%	2,044	41.44%	61	1.24%	50	1.01%	0	0.00%	734	14.88%	4,933
Butler	3,049	53.97%	2,290	40.54%	149	2.64%	160	2.83%	1	0.02%	759	13.44%	5,649
Chase	1,021	53.04%	834	43.32%	46	2.39%	24	1.25%	0	0.00%	187	9.71%	1,925
Chautauqua	1,689	60.19%	958	34.14%	148	5.27%	11	0.39%	0	0.00%	731	26.05%	2,806
Cherokee	3,893	44.26%	3,819	43.42%	1,030	11.71%	51	0.58%	2	0.02%	74	0.84%	8,795
Cheyenne	486	54.30%	339	37.88%	41	4.58%	20	2.23%	9	1.01%	147	16.42%	895
Clark	386	49.87%	350	45.22%	24	3.10%	12	1.55%	2	0.26%	36	4.65%	774
Clay	1,858	52.96%	1,495	42.62%	102	2.91%	52	1.48%	1	0.03%	363	10.35%	3,508
Cloud	2,170	52.24%	1,663	40.03%	244	5.87%	76	1.83%	1	0.02%	507	12.21%	4,154
Coffey	2,094	53.38%	1,729	44.07%	35	0.89%	63	1.61%	2	0.05%	365	9.30%	3,923
Comanche	392	59.67%	245	37.29%	10	1.52%	10	1.52%	0	0.00%	147	22.37%	657
Cowley	3,578	50.55%	2,995	42.31%	396	5.59%	109	1.54%	0	0.00%	583	8.24%	7,078
Crawford	5,152	46.55%	4,230	38.22%	1,631	14.74%	54	0.49%	1	0.01%	922	8.33%	11,068
Decatur	898	39.18%	1,250	54.54%	94	4.10%	41	1.79%	9	0.39%	-352	-15.36%	2,292
Dickinson	2,886	53.31%	2,282	42.15%	152	2.81%	94	1.74%	0	0.00%	604	11.16%	5,414
Doniphan	2,307	66.46%	1,113	32.07%	33	0.95%	18	0.52%	0	0.00%	1,194	34.40%	3,471
Douglas	3,279	60.63%	2,010	37.17%	49	0.91%	70	1.29%	0	0.00%	1,269	23.47%	5,408
Edwards	773	50.23%	704	45.74%	27	1.75%	35	2.27%	0	0.00%	69	4.48%	1,539
Elk	1,454	54.11%	1,187	44.18%	25	0.93%	21	0.78%	0	0.00%	267	9.94%	2,687
Ellis	768	34.50%	1,421	63.84%	20	0.90%	17	0.76%	0	0.00%	-653	-29.34%	2,226
Ellsworth	1,213	52.95%	1,039	45.35%	13	0.57%	26	1.13%	0	0.00%	174	7.59%	2,291
Finney	1,000	61.46%	551	33.87%	58	3.56%	18	1.11%	0	0.00%	449	27.60%	1,627
Ford	1,333	53.28%	1,089	43.53%	44	1.76%	36	1.44%	0	0.00%	244	9.75%	2,502
Franklin	2,658	52.74%	2,155	42.76%	93	1.85%	134	2.66%	0	0.00%	503	9.98%	5,040
Geary	1,257	53.38%	1,033	43.86%	38	1.61%	27	1.15%	0	0.00%	224	9.51%	2,355
Gove	632	55.15%	456	39.79%	32	2.79%	26	2.27%	0	0.00%	176	15.36%	1,146
Graham	911	52.24%	723	41.46%	95	5.45%	15	0.86%	0	0.00%	188	10.78%	1,744
Grant	178	54.77%	133	40.92%	12	3.69%	2	0.62%	0	0.00%	45	13.85%	325
Gray	372	46.79%	338	42.52%	64	8.05%	21	2.64%	0	0.00%	34	4.28%	795
Greeley	206	64.58%	89	27.90%	21	6.58%	3	0.94%	0	0.00%	117	36.68%	319
Greenwood	2,370	59.16%	1,545	38.57%	69	1.72%	22	0.55%	0	0.00%	825	20.59%	4,006
Hamilton	415	57.32%	275	37.98%	30	4.14%	4	0.55%	0	0.00%	140	19.34%	724
Harper	1,490	48.46%	1,404	45.66%	112	3.64%	69	2.24%	0	0.00%	86	2.80%	3,075
Harvey	2,305	58.30%	1,475	37.30%	99	2.50%	74	1.87%	1	0.03%	830	20.99%	3,954
Haskell	172	48.73%	139	39.38%	36	10.20%	6	1.70%	0	0.00%	33	9.35%	353
Hodgeman	411	57.08%	290	40.28%	7	0.97%	12	1.67%	0	0.00%	121	16.81%	720
Jackson	2,201	58.65%	1,494	39.81%	17	0.45%	39	1.04%	2	0.05%	707	18.84%	3,753
Jefferson	2,270	55.57%	1,720	42.11%	64	1.57%	31	0.76%	0	0.00%	550	13.46%	4,085
Jewell	2,410	53.48%	1,932	42.88%	54	1.20%	110	2.44%	0	0.00%	478	10.61%	4,506
Johnson	2,313	51.17%	2,091	46.26%	88	1.95%	28	0.62%	0	0.00%	222	4.91%	4,520
Kearny	435	56.64%	304	39.58%	26	3.39%	3	0.39%	0	0.00%	131	17.06%	768
Kingman	1,442	47.26%	1,479	48.48%	84	2.75%	45	1.47%	1	0.03%	-37	-1.21%	3,051
Kiowa	699	59.49%	409	34.81%	37	3.15%	30	2.55%	0	0.00%	290	24.68%	1,175
Labette	3,367	49.17%	2,783	40.64%	643	9.39%	54	0.79%	1	0.01%	584	8.53%	6,848
Lane	357	51.52%	271	39.11%	49	7.07%	16	2.31%	0	0.00%	86	12.41%	693
Leavenworth	4,846	53.87%	3,818	42.44%	288	3.20%	43	0.48%	1	0.01%	1,028	11.43%	8,996
Lincoln	1,218	50.27%	1,117	46.10%	58	2.39%	30	1.24%	0	0.00%	101	4.17%	2,423
Linn	1,950	51.79%	1,657	44.01%	126	3.35%	31	0.82%	1	0.03%	293	7.78%	3,765
Logan	524	59.34%	308	34.88%	32	3.62%	18	2.04%	1	0.11%	216	24.46%	883
Lyon	2,973	50.87%	2,562	43.84%	161	2.75%	147	2.52%	1	0.02%	411	7.03%	5,844
Marion	2,546	57.45%	1,747	39.42%	57	1.29%	80	1.81%	2	0.05%	799	18.03%	4,432
Marshall	3,296	55.91%	2,514	42.65%	32	0.54%	53	0.90%	0	0.00%	782	13.27%	5,895
McPherson	2,708	57.39%	1,905	40.37%	55	1.17%	51	1.08%	0	0.00%	803	17.02%	4,719
Meade	560	56.22%	386	38.76%	26	2.61%	24	2.41%	0	0.00%	174	17.47%	996
Miami	2,475	51.03%	2,256	46.52%	91	1.88%	26	0.54%	2	0.04%	219	4.52%	4,850
Mitchell	1,765	50.50%	1,570	44.92%	118	3.38%	42	1.20%	0	0.00%	195	5.58%	3,495
Montgomery	5,166	52.10%	4,030	40.64%	661	6.67%	57	0.57%	2	0.02%	1,136	11.46%	9,916
Morris	1,788	57.53%	1,273	40.96%	19	0.61%	28	0.90%	0	0.00%	515	16.57%	3,108
Morton	154	50.49%	140	45.90%	6	1.97%	5	1.64%	0	0.00%	14	4.59%	305
Nemaha	2,394	51.57%	2,182	47.01%	32	0.69%	33	0.71%	1	0.02%	212	4.57%	4,642
Neosho	2,929	53.15%	2,386	43.30%	166	3.01%	29	0.53%	1	0.02%	543	9.85%	5,511
Ness	635	47.96%	461	34.82%	109	8.23%	117	8.84%	2	0.15%	174	13.14%	1,324
Norton	1,448	49.76%	1,337	45.95%	59	2.03%	66	2.27%	0	0.00%	111	3.81%	2,910
Osage	2,671	50.30%	2,288	43.09%	264	4.97%	86	1.62%	1	0.02%	383	7.21%	5,310
Osborne	1,665	55.30%	1,132	37.60%	45	1.49%	169	5.61%	0	0.00%	533	17.70%	3,011
Ottawa	1,444	50.54%	1,265	44.28%	83	2.91%	65	2.28%	0	0.00%	179	6.27%	2,857
Pawnee	1,000	48.43%	961	46.54%	68	3.29%	36	1.74%	0	0.00%	39	1.89%	2,065
Phillips	1,762	52.25%	1,490	44.19%	65	1.93%	55	1.63%	0	0.00%	272	8.07%	3,372
Pottawatomie	2,650	60.78%	1,680	38.53%	11	0.25%	19	0.44%	0	0.00%	970	22.25%	4,360
Pratt	1,193	50.53%	1,027	43.50%	67	2.84%	73	3.09%	1	0.04%	166	7.03%	2,361
Rawlins	719	47.36%	732	48.22%	59	3.89%	7	0.46%	1	0.07%	-13	-0.86%	1,518
Reno	4,092	52.72%	3,381	43.56%	175	2.25%	114	1.47%	0	0.00%	711	9.16%	7,762
Republic	2,156	51.79%	1,905	45.76%	35	0.84%	67	1.61%	0	0.00%	251	6.03%	4,163
Rice	1,832	51.35%	1,407	39.43%	110	3.08%	217	6.08%	2	0.06%	425	11.91%	3,568
Riley	2,276	61.71%	1,289	34.95%	65	1.76%	58	1.57%	0	0.00%	987	26.76%	3,688
Rooks	1,280	53.13%	1,003	41.64%	75	3.11%	51	2.12%	0	0.00%	277	11.50%	2,409
Rush	764	45.02%	894	52.68%	30	1.77%	9	0.53%	0	0.00%	-130	-7.66%	1,697
Russell	1,360	57.12%	976	40.99%	27	1.13%	18	0.76%	0	0.00%	384	16.13%	2,381
Saline	2,297	50.15%	2,134	46.59%	116	2.53%	33	0.72%	0	0.00%	163	3.56%	4,580
Scott	324	47.09%	294	42.73%	61	8.87%	8	1.16%	1	0.15%	30	4.36%	688
Sedgwick	6,756	50.25%	6,049	44.99%	390	2.90%	247	1.84%	3	0.02%	707	5.26%	13,445
Seward	427	48.09%	413	46.51%	33	3.72%	15	1.69%	0	0.00%	14	1.58%	888
Shawnee	7,554	56.28%	5,585	41.61%	170	1.27%	112	0.83%	0	0.00%	1,969	14.67%	13,421
Sheridan	639	48.89%	631	48.28%	22	1.68%	15	1.15%	0	0.00%	8	0.61%	1,307
Sherman	439	43.64%	508	50.50%	46	4.57%	13	1.29%	0	0.00%	-69	-6.86%	1,006
Smith	1,843	51.65%	1,593	44.65%	51	1.43%	78	2.19%	3	0.08%	250	7.01%	3,568
Stafford	1,334	50.99%	1,135	43.39%	48	1.83%	99	3.78%	0	0.00%	199	7.61%	2,616
Stanton	180	60.81%	107	36.15%	6	2.03%	3	1.01%	0	0.00%	73	24.66%	296
Stevens	258	48.22%	215	40.19%	39	7.29%	23	4.30%	0	0.00%	43	8.04%	535
Sumner	3,235	51.30%	2,772	43.96%	204	3.24%	95	1.51%	0	0.00%	463	7.34%	6,306
Thomas	569	44.98%	630	49.80%	44	3.48%	22	1.74%	0	0.00%	-61	-4.82%	1,265
Trego	617	54.65%	458	40.57%	32	2.83%	20	1.77%	2	0.18%	159	14.08%	1,129
Wabaunsee	1,849	60.25%	1,163	37.90%	24	0.78%	33	1.08%	0	0.00%	686	22.35%	3,069
Wallace	350	59.32%	206	34.92%	23	3.90%	11	1.86%	0	0.00%	144	24.41%	590
Washington	2,711	57.51%	1,904	40.39%	46	0.98%	53	1.12%	0	0.00%	807	17.12%	4,714
Wichita	233	54.31%	173	40.33%	22	5.13%	1	0.23%	0	0.00%	60	13.99%	429
Wilson	2,428	53.14%	1,777	38.89%	324	7.09%	40	0.88%	0	0.00%	651	14.25%	4,569
Woodson	1,252	53.23%	1,047	44.52%	41	1.74%	12	0.51%	0	0.00%	205	8.72%	2,352
Wyandotte	8,684	47.56%	8,923	48.87%	528	2.89%	117	0.64%	7	0.04%	-239	-1.31%	18,259
Totals	197,316	52.47%	161,209	42.87%	12,420	3.30%	5,030	1.34%	70	0.02%	36,107	9.60%	376,045

== See also ==
- United States presidential elections in Kansas
