= Stanton Township, Stanton County, Kansas =

Township in Stanton County, Kansas, U.S.

Stanton Township
- Township
- Location within Stanton County
- Coordinates: 37.561036°N 101.774621°W
- Country: United States
- State: Kansas
- County: Stanton

Area
  - Total: 214.814 sq mi (556.37 km^{2})
  - Land: 214.773 sq mi (556.26 km^{2})
  - Water: 0.041 sq mi (0.11 km^{2}) 0.02%

Population (2020)
  - Total: 1,619
  - Density: 7.538/sq mi (2.911/km^{2})
- Time zone: UTC-6 (CST)
  - Summer (DST): UTC-5 (CDT)
- Area code: 620
- GNIS feature ID: 485075

Stanton Township is a township in Stanton County, Kansas, United States. As of the 2020 census, its population was 1,619.

== Geography ==
Stanton Township covers an area of 214.814 square miles (556.37 square kilometers). Bear Creek flows through it.

=== Communities ===
- Johnson City

=== Adjacent townships ===
| Bear Creek Township, Hamilton County | northwest | | northeast | Lamont Township, Hamilton County |
| Manter Township, Stanton County | west | self | east | Big Bow Township, Stanton County |
| | | south |
Richfield Township, Morton County

== Transportation ==
Stanton County Municipal Airport, which serves the county, lies within the township.

=== Major highways ===
- US-160
- K-27

== Demographics ==
As of the 2020 census, there were 1,619 people and 659 households residing in the township. The population density was 7.538 people per square mile (2.910 people/km^{2}). There were 791 housing units. The racial makeup of the township was 53.7% White, 2.0% Native American, 0.4% Black or African American, 0.1% Asian, 26.7% from some other race, and 17.2% from two or more races. Hispanics or Latinos of any race were 51.3% of the population.

There were 659 households: 56.4% were married couples living together, 21.5% were a male householder with no spouse present, and 12.6% were a female householder with no spouse present. The average family size was 3.23 people. 37.7% of people in the township older than 24 had a college degree, and the township had an employment rate of 67.4%.
