= 1916 United States presidential election in Kansas =

- November 7, 1916

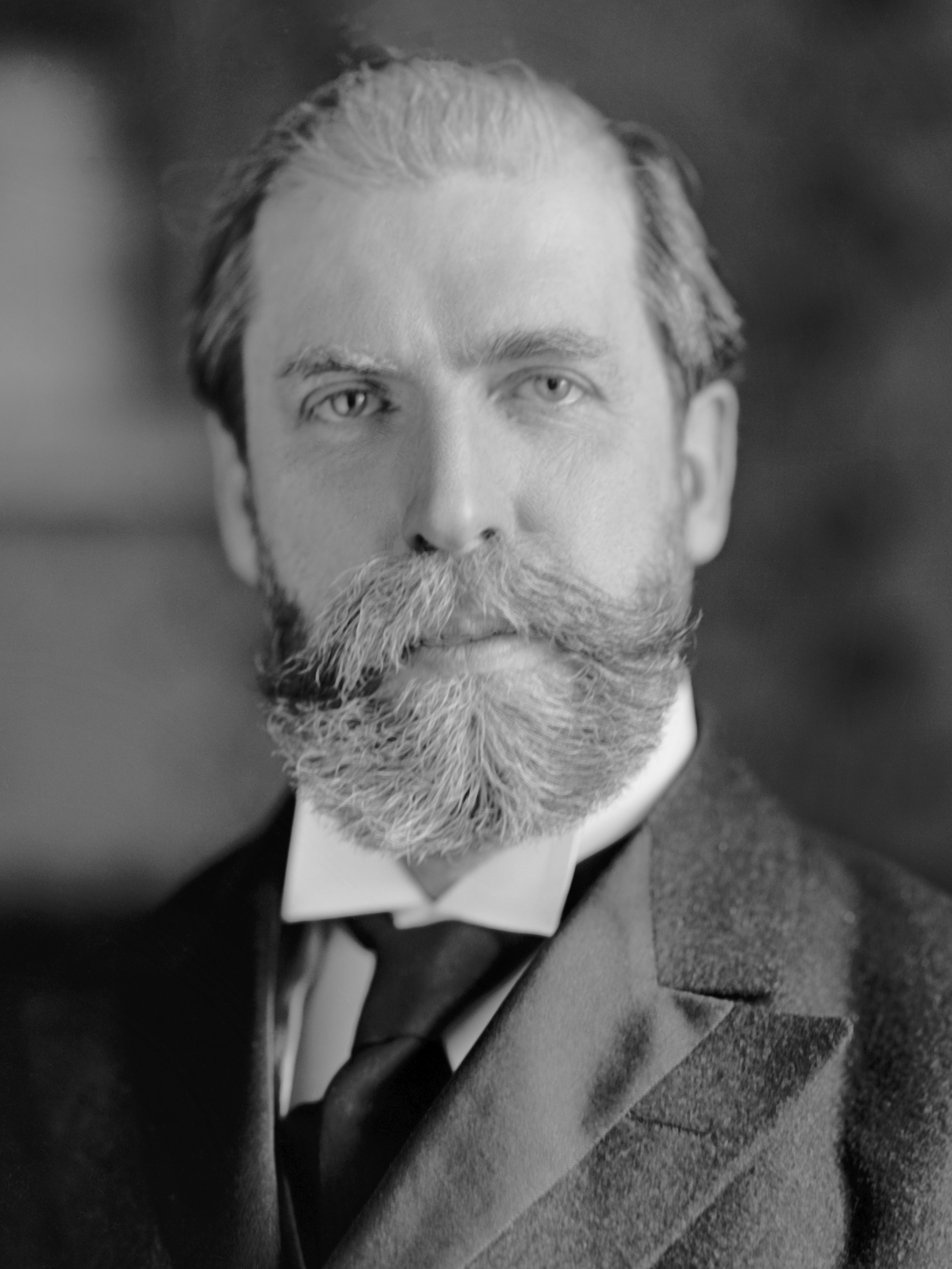
Nominee	Woodrow Wilson	Charles Evans Hughes
Party	Democratic	Republican
Home state	New Jersey	New York
Running mate	Thomas R. Marshall	Charles W. Fairbanks
Electoral vote	10	0
Popular vote	314,588	277,658
Percentage	49.95%	44.09%
County results
Wilson
40–50%
50–60%
60–70%
Hughes
40–50%
50–60%
President before election
Woodrow Wilson
Democratic
Elected President
Woodrow Wilson
Democratic

The 1916 United States presidential election in Kansas was held on November 7, 1916. Kansas voters chose ten electors to the Electoral College, who voted for president and vice president.

Kansas voted for the Democratic nominee, incumbent President Woodrow Wilson, over the Republican nominee, U.S. Supreme Court Justice and former New York Governor Charles Evans Hughes. Wilson won Kansas by a margin of 5.86 percentage points.

As of the 2024 presidential election, this is the last election in which Osborne County voted for a Democratic presidential candidate. Johnson County would not vote for a Democrat for President again until Joe Biden won it in 2020. The 1916 election was the second and last time that Kansas has voted more Democratic than the nation (the first being the 1896 election), the last time it voted more Democratic than New Mexico or Oregon, and the only time until 2020 that it voted more Democratic than neighboring Missouri.

== Results ==
Presidential Candidate	Running Mate	Party	Electoral Vote (EV)	Popular Vote (PV)	
Woodrow Wilson of New Jersey	Thomas R. Marshall	Democratic	10	314,588	49.95%
Charles Evans Hughes	Charles W. Fairbanks	Republican	0	277,658	44.09%
Allan L. Benson	George Ross Kirkpatrick	Socialist	0	24,685	3.92%
Frank Hanly	Ira Landrith	Prohibition	0	12,882	2.05%

=== Results by county ===
1916 United States presidential election in Kansas by county
County	Thomas Woodrow Wilson Democratic		Charles Evans Hughes Republican		Allan Louis Benson Socialist		James Franklin Hanly Prohibition		Margin		Total votes cast
County	#	%	#	%	#	%	#	%	#	%	Total votes cast
Allen	4,053	46.90%	4,129	47.78%	354	4.10%	105	1.22%	-76	-0.88%	8,641
Anderson	2,739	50.45%	2,386	43.95%	227	4.18%	77	1.42%	353	6.50%	5,429
Atchison	4,634	48.72%	4,624	48.61%	101	1.06%	153	1.61%	10	0.11%	9,512
Barber	2,061	51.74%	1,632	40.97%	172	4.32%	118	2.96%	429	10.77%	3,983
Barton	3,292	50.63%	2,891	44.46%	212	3.26%	107	1.65%	401	6.17%	6,502
Bourbon	5,209	58.09%	3,370	37.58%	302	3.37%	86	0.96%	1,839	20.51%	8,967
Brown	3,503	43.25%	4,282	52.86%	190	2.35%	125	1.54%	-779	-9.62%	8,100
Butler	4,248	50.73%	3,614	43.16%	296	3.54%	215	2.57%	634	7.57%	8,373
Chase	1,584	51.56%	1,356	44.14%	80	2.60%	52	1.69%	228	7.42%	3,072
Chautauqua	1,737	41.40%	2,085	49.69%	345	8.22%	29	0.69%	-348	-8.29%	4,196
Cherokee	6,188	53.41%	4,350	37.55%	931	8.04%	116	1.00%	1,838	15.87%	11,585
Cheyenne	787	50.22%	498	31.78%	177	11.30%	105	6.70%	289	18.44%	1,567
Clark	1,102	58.03%	653	34.39%	59	3.11%	85	4.48%	449	23.64%	1,899
Clay	2,632	46.63%	2,692	47.70%	227	4.02%	93	1.65%	-60	-1.06%	5,644
Cloud	3,837	53.37%	2,870	39.92%	189	2.63%	294	4.09%	967	13.45%	7,190
Coffey	3,121	50.81%	2,799	45.57%	161	2.62%	61	0.99%	322	5.24%	6,142
Comanche	963	50.71%	732	38.55%	111	5.85%	93	4.90%	231	12.16%	1,899
Cowley	5,962	49.37%	5,297	43.87%	612	5.07%	204	1.69%	665	5.51%	12,075
Crawford	8,064	43.50%	7,067	38.12%	3,279	17.69%	129	0.70%	997	5.38%	18,539
Decatur	2,431	66.95%	1,007	27.73%	146	4.02%	47	1.29%	1,424	39.22%	3,631
Dickinson	4,974	51.85%	4,323	45.06%	180	1.88%	116	1.21%	651	6.79%	9,593
Doniphan	1,916	39.36%	2,826	58.05%	91	1.87%	35	0.72%	-910	-18.69%	4,868
Douglas	3,834	41.52%	4,975	53.87%	171	1.85%	255	2.76%	-1,141	-12.36%	9,235
Edwards	1,431	50.42%	1,158	40.80%	90	3.17%	159	5.60%	273	9.62%	2,838
Elk	2,053	50.99%	1,769	43.94%	163	4.05%	41	1.02%	284	7.05%	4,026
Ellis	2,335	64.72%	1,186	32.87%	55	1.52%	32	0.89%	1,149	31.85%	3,608
Ellsworth	1,936	48.11%	1,945	48.33%	74	1.84%	69	1.71%	-9	-0.22%	4,024
Finney	1,370	47.31%	1,238	42.75%	185	6.39%	103	3.56%	132	4.56%	2,896
Ford	3,044	52.47%	2,337	40.29%	185	3.19%	235	4.05%	707	12.19%	5,801
Franklin	4,128	47.99%	3,885	45.17%	304	3.53%	284	3.30%	243	2.83%	8,601
Geary	1,740	48.45%	1,731	48.20%	97	2.70%	23	0.64%	9	0.25%	3,591
Gove	862	53.81%	642	40.07%	55	3.43%	43	2.68%	220	13.73%	1,602
Graham	1,801	55.79%	1,150	35.63%	241	7.47%	36	1.12%	651	20.17%	3,228
Grant	208	46.33%	200	44.54%	32	7.13%	9	2.00%	8	1.78%	449
Gray	889	52.08%	660	38.66%	90	5.27%	68	3.98%	229	13.42%	1,707
Greeley	168	34.85%	210	43.57%	69	14.32%	35	7.26%	-42	-8.71%	482
Greenwood	2,956	48.03%	2,971	48.28%	174	2.83%	53	0.86%	-15	-0.24%	6,154
Hamilton	522	45.00%	511	44.05%	101	8.71%	26	2.24%	11	0.95%	1,160
Harper	2,648	54.22%	1,797	36.79%	195	3.99%	244	5.00%	851	17.42%	4,884
Harvey	3,131	44.08%	3,479	48.98%	332	4.67%	161	2.27%	-348	-4.90%	7,103
Haskell	349	50.95%	248	36.20%	57	8.32%	31	4.53%	101	14.74%	685
Hodgeman	761	50.53%	564	37.45%	45	2.99%	136	9.03%	197	13.08%	1,506
Jackson	2,914	45.12%	3,451	53.43%	34	0.53%	60	0.93%	-537	-8.31%	6,459
Jefferson	2,919	46.44%	3,174	50.49%	116	1.85%	77	1.22%	-255	-4.06%	6,286
Jewell	4,180	55.11%	3,022	39.84%	135	1.78%	248	3.27%	1,158	15.27%	7,585
Johnson	3,928	49.72%	3,767	47.68%	137	1.73%	68	0.86%	161	2.04%	7,900
Kearny	490	41.25%	538	45.29%	109	9.18%	51	4.29%	-48	-4.04%	1,188
Kingman	2,626	53.13%	1,891	38.26%	167	3.38%	259	5.24%	735	14.87%	4,943
Kiowa	956	43.47%	901	40.97%	40	1.82%	302	13.73%	55	2.50%	2,199
Labette	6,421	51.35%	5,328	42.61%	656	5.25%	99	0.79%	1,093	8.74%	12,504
Lane	659	58.22%	363	32.07%	81	7.16%	29	2.56%	296	26.15%	1,132
Leavenworth	6,002	49.29%	5,536	45.46%	536	4.40%	104	0.85%	466	3.83%	12,178
Lincoln	2,106	53.45%	1,716	43.55%	54	1.37%	64	1.62%	390	9.90%	3,940
Linn	2,930	49.36%	2,699	45.47%	256	4.31%	51	0.86%	231	3.89%	5,936
Logan	709	50.36%	592	42.05%	70	4.97%	37	2.63%	117	8.31%	1,408
Lyon	5,584	53.36%	4,215	40.28%	357	3.41%	308	2.94%	1,369	13.08%	10,464
Marion	2,790	42.13%	3,453	52.14%	274	4.14%	105	1.59%	-663	-10.01%	6,622
Marshall	4,275	46.74%	4,581	50.08%	185	2.02%	106	1.16%	-306	-3.35%	9,147
McPherson	3,737	46.75%	3,806	47.61%	238	2.98%	213	2.66%	-69	-0.86%	7,994
Meade	977	45.15%	973	44.96%	71	3.28%	143	6.61%	4	0.18%	2,164
Miami	4,047	54.74%	3,086	41.74%	199	2.69%	61	0.83%	961	13.00%	7,393
Mitchell	3,197	54.88%	2,413	41.42%	137	2.35%	78	1.34%	784	13.46%	5,825
Montgomery	8,059	52.44%	6,371	41.45%	764	4.97%	175	1.14%	1,688	10.98%	15,369
Morris	2,577	51.48%	2,289	45.73%	87	1.74%	53	1.06%	288	5.75%	5,006
Morton	457	47.85%	405	42.41%	51	5.34%	42	4.40%	52	5.45%	955
Nemaha	3,579	49.03%	3,591	49.19%	61	0.84%	69	0.95%	-12	-0.16%	7,300
Neosho	4,891	52.94%	4,053	43.87%	238	2.58%	57	0.62%	838	9.07%	9,239
Ness	1,213	49.23%	927	37.62%	177	7.18%	147	5.97%	286	11.61%	2,464
Norton	2,876	61.01%	1,616	34.28%	173	3.67%	49	1.04%	1,260	26.73%	4,714
Osage	4,276	50.69%	3,770	44.69%	287	3.40%	103	1.22%	506	6.00%	8,436
Osborne	2,621	51.58%	2,149	42.29%	82	1.61%	229	4.51%	472	9.29%	5,081
Ottawa	2,711	54.61%	2,013	40.55%	117	2.36%	123	2.48%	698	14.06%	4,964
Pawnee	2,131	55.05%	1,499	38.72%	120	3.10%	121	3.13%	632	16.33%	3,871
Phillips	2,912	53.65%	2,271	41.84%	149	2.75%	96	1.77%	641	11.81%	5,428
Pottawatomie	2,834	42.77%	3,688	55.66%	61	0.92%	43	0.65%	-854	-12.89%	6,626
Pratt	2,607	54.34%	1,820	37.93%	130	2.71%	241	5.02%	787	16.40%	4,798
Rawlins	1,271	55.48%	803	35.05%	165	7.20%	52	2.27%	468	20.43%	2,291
Reno	6,683	44.80%	6,870	46.05%	941	6.31%	425	2.85%	-187	-1.25%	14,919
Republic	3,806	55.00%	2,882	41.65%	147	2.12%	85	1.23%	924	13.35%	6,920
Rice	2,801	47.86%	2,494	42.62%	188	3.21%	369	6.31%	307	5.25%	5,852
Riley	2,637	41.57%	3,320	52.34%	299	4.71%	87	1.37%	-683	-10.77%	6,343
Rooks	2,394	56.54%	1,621	38.29%	111	2.62%	108	2.55%	773	18.26%	4,234
Rush	1,478	50.34%	1,223	41.66%	173	5.89%	62	2.11%	255	8.69%	2,936
Russell	1,934	47.01%	2,011	48.88%	79	1.92%	90	2.19%	-77	-1.87%	4,114
Saline	4,860	52.76%	3,984	43.25%	225	2.44%	143	1.55%	876	9.51%	9,212
Scott	684	54.50%	416	33.15%	110	8.76%	45	3.59%	268	21.35%	1,255
Sedgwick	13,391	51.34%	10,899	41.79%	868	3.33%	924	3.54%	2,492	9.55%	26,082
Seward	1,105	56.26%	678	34.52%	97	4.94%	84	4.28%	427	21.74%	1,964
Shawnee	9,468	41.14%	12,634	54.90%	510	2.22%	402	1.75%	-3,166	-13.76%	23,014
Sheridan	1,189	58.66%	760	37.49%	55	2.71%	23	1.13%	429	21.16%	2,027
Sherman	1,196	63.35%	582	30.83%	87	4.61%	23	1.22%	614	32.52%	1,888
Smith	3,431	54.10%	2,605	41.08%	175	2.76%	131	2.07%	826	13.02%	6,342
Stafford	2,148	49.63%	1,812	41.87%	174	4.02%	194	4.48%	336	7.76%	4,328
Stanton	170	42.08%	180	44.55%	22	5.45%	32	7.92%	-10	-2.48%	404
Stevens	646	55.31%	391	33.48%	46	3.94%	85	7.28%	255	21.83%	1,168
Sumner	5,519	53.27%	4,079	39.37%	458	4.42%	305	2.94%	1,440	13.90%	10,361
Thomas	1,299	63.03%	642	31.15%	101	4.90%	19	0.92%	657	31.88%	2,061
Trego	1,094	53.08%	867	42.07%	68	3.30%	32	1.55%	227	11.01%	2,061
Wabaunsee	1,706	38.10%	2,640	58.95%	89	1.99%	43	0.96%	-934	-20.86%	4,478
Wallace	497	51.50%	381	39.48%	79	8.19%	8	0.83%	116	12.02%	965
Washington	3,316	45.54%	3,766	51.72%	127	1.74%	73	1.00%	-450	-6.18%	7,282
Wichita	333	46.12%	318	44.04%	43	5.96%	28	3.88%	15	2.08%	722
Wilson	3,494	49.18%	2,970	41.81%	553	7.78%	87	1.22%	524	7.38%	7,104
Woodson	1,794	46.48%	1,861	48.21%	161	4.17%	44	1.14%	-67	-1.74%	3,860
Wyandotte	17,850	53.89%	13,863	41.86%	1,028	3.10%	380	1.15%	3,987	12.04%	33,121
Totals	314,588	49.95%	277,658	44.09%	24,685	3.92%	12,882	2.05%	36,930	5.86%	629,813

== See also ==
- United States presidential elections in Kansas
