= 1896 United States presidential election in Kansas =

- November 3, 1896

Nominee	William Jennings Bryan	William McKinley
Party	Democratic	Republican
Alliance	Populist
Home state	Nebraska	Ohio
Running mate	Arthur Sewall	Garret Hobart
Electoral vote	10	0
Popular vote	171,675	159,345
Percentage	51.32%	47.63%
County results
Bryan
40–50%
50–60%
60–70%
McKinley
40–50%
50–60%
60–70%
President before election
Grover Cleveland
Democratic
Elected President
William McKinley
Republican

The 1896 United States presidential election in Kansas took place on November 3, 1896. All contemporary 45 states were part of the 1896 United States presidential election. Kansas voters chose ten electors to the Electoral College, which selected the president and vice president.

Kansas was won by the Democratic nominees, former U.S. Representative William Jennings Bryan of Nebraska and his running mate Arthur Sewall of Maine. The Republican nominees, former Governor of Ohio William McKinley and his running mate Garret Hobart of New Jersey. Bryan won the state by a narrow margin of 3.69%.

With his win in the state, Bryan became the first Democratic presidential candidate to win the state of Kansas. Bryan would later lose Kansas to McKinley four years later during their rematch and would later lose the state again to William Howard Taft in 1908. This remains the only election since Kansas statehood in which the Republican candidate won the presidency without Kansas, or where Kansas voted more Democratic than Maryland.

This was the last election until 2020 in which a Democrat carried Johnson County with a majority.

This was the first of six elections in which the Democratic nominee carried Kansas, traditionally a Republican bastion like the other Plains States. The others were 1912, 1916, 1932, 1936, and 1964.

== Results ==
1896 United States presidential election in Kansas
Party	Candidate	Votes	Percentage	Electoral votes
Democratic	William Jennings Bryan	125,481	37.51%	10
Populist	William Jennings Bryan	46,194	13.81%	0
Total	William Jennings Bryan	171,675	51.32%	10
Republican	William McKinley	159,345	47.63%	0
Prohibition	Joshua Levering	1,698	0.51%	0
National Democratic	John M. Palmer	1,209	0.36%	0
National Prohibition	Charles Eugene Bentley	620	0.19%	0
Totals		334,547	100.00%	10
Voter turnout				—

=== Results by county ===
1896 United States presidential election in Kansas by county
County	William Jennings Bryan Democratic/Populist		William McKinley Republican		Joshua Levering Prohibition		John McAuley Palmer National Democratic		Charles Eugene Bentley National Prohibition		Margin		Total votes cast
County	#	%	#	%	#	%	#	%	#	%	#	%	Total votes cast
Allen	1,656	46.45%	1,833	51.42%	21	0.59%	22	0.62%	20	0.56%	-177	-4.96%	3,565
Anderson	1,890	50.41%	1,780	47.48%	35	0.93%	14	0.37%	23	0.61%	110	2.93%	3,749
Atchison	2,963	46.84%	3,326	52.58%	10	0.16%	16	0.25%	2	0.03%	-363	-5.74%	6,326
Barber	729	54.04%	597	44.26%	10	0.74%	4	0.30%	3	0.22%	132	9.79%	1,349
Barton	1,616	56.39%	1,215	42.39%	4	0.14%	18	0.63%	2	0.07%	401	13.99%	2,866
Bourbon	3,067	50.85%	2,900	48.08%	20	0.33%	28	0.46%	6	0.10%	167	2.77%	6,032
Brown	2,618	46.69%	2,879	51.35%	49	0.87%	20	0.36%	9	0.16%	-261	-4.65%	5,607
Butler	2,926	54.28%	2,414	44.78%	22	0.41%	9	0.17%	5	0.09%	512	9.50%	5,391
Chase	981	54.05%	812	44.74%	12	0.66%	8	0.44%	2	0.11%	169	9.31%	1,815
Chautauqua	1,293	48.17%	1,359	50.63%	5	0.19%	10	0.37%	2	0.07%	-66	-2.46%	2,684
Cherokee	5,108	58.14%	3,505	39.90%	44	0.50%	46	0.52%	17	0.19%	1,603	18.25%	8,785
Cheyenne	322	48.42%	327	49.17%	4	0.60%	4	0.60%	3	0.45%	-5	-0.75%	665
Clark	191	50.80%	182	48.40%	0	0.00%	0	0.00%	1	0.27%	9	2.39%	376
Clay	1,929	52.99%	1,655	45.47%	32	0.88%	7	0.19%	11	0.30%	274	7.53%	3,640
Cloud	2,129	54.60%	1,718	44.06%	21	0.54%	9	0.23%	14	0.36%	411	10.54%	3,899
Coffey	2,194	51.24%	2,000	46.71%	32	0.75%	36	0.84%	8	0.19%	194	4.53%	4,282
Comanche	172	54.26%	142	44.79%	0	0.00%	2	0.63%	0	0.00%	30	9.46%	317
Cowley	3,410	53.22%	2,871	44.81%	51	0.80%	20	0.31%	7	0.11%	539	8.41%	6,407
Crawford	4,757	54.17%	3,868	44.05%	24	0.27%	38	0.43%	24	0.27%	889	10.12%	8,781
Decatur	1,032	63.00%	594	36.26%	3	0.18%	4	0.24%	0	0.00%	438	26.74%	1,638
Dickinson	2,399	50.47%	2,291	48.20%	28	0.59%	16	0.34%	8	0.17%	108	2.27%	4,753
Doniphan	1,332	34.02%	2,549	65.11%	6	0.15%	8	0.20%	4	0.10%	-1,217	-31.09%	3,915
Douglas	2,573	41.08%	3,582	57.19%	42	0.67%	17	0.27%	28	0.45%	-1,009	-16.11%	6,263
Edwards	479	58.85%	322	39.56%	5	0.61%	2	0.25%	0	0.00%	157	19.29%	814
Elk	1,464	51.97%	1,339	47.53%	7	0.25%	4	0.14%	1	0.04%	125	4.44%	2,817
Ellis	1,051	68.29%	460	29.89%	9	0.59%	13	0.85%	0	0.00%	591	38.40%	1,539
Ellsworth	992	48.09%	1,048	50.80%	5	0.24%	7	0.34%	6	0.29%	-56	-2.71%	2,063
Finney	366	41.69%	505	57.52%	1	0.11%	1	0.11%	0	0.00%	-139	-15.83%	878
Ford	643	52.88%	555	45.64%	6	0.49%	3	0.25%	6	0.49%	88	7.24%	1,216
Franklin	3,152	54.18%	2,609	44.84%	23	0.40%	9	0.15%	19	0.33%	543	9.33%	5,818
Geary	1,171	52.02%	1,051	46.69%	16	0.71%	8	0.35%	2	0.09%	120	5.33%	2,251
Gove	204	39.77%	279	54.39%	4	0.78%	14	2.73%	3	0.58%	-75	-14.62%	513
Graham	648	64.61%	343	34.20%	3	0.30%	3	0.30%	2	0.20%	305	30.41%	1,003
Grant	60	53.57%	51	45.54%	0	0.00%	0	0.00%	0	0.00%	9	8.04%	112
Gray	133	46.50%	153	53.50%	0	0.00%	0	0.00%	0	0.00%	-20	-6.99%	286
Greeley	76	38.00%	121	60.50%	2	1.00%	0	0.00%	0	0.00%	-45	-22.50%	200
Greenwood	2,064	52.48%	1,835	46.66%	12	0.31%	10	0.25%	1	0.03%	229	5.82%	3,933
Hamilton	216	53.20%	185	45.57%	1	0.25%	3	0.74%	1	0.25%	31	7.64%	406
Harper	1,332	61.27%	812	37.35%	13	0.60%	11	0.51%	5	0.23%	520	23.92%	2,174
Harvey	1,678	43.79%	2,082	54.33%	24	0.63%	17	0.44%	14	0.37%	-404	-10.54%	3,832
Haskell	54	39.13%	81	58.70%	0	0.00%	3	2.17%	0	0.00%	-27	-19.57%	138
Hodgeman	224	45.81%	262	53.58%	2	0.41%	0	0.00%	0	0.00%	-38	-7.77%	489
Jackson	1,955	47.03%	2,158	51.91%	20	0.48%	11	0.26%	3	0.07%	-203	-4.88%	4,157
Jefferson	2,276	48.86%	2,322	49.85%	25	0.54%	19	0.41%	5	0.11%	-46	-0.99%	4,658
Jewell	2,342	54.57%	1,902	44.32%	19	0.44%	7	0.16%	14	0.33%	440	10.25%	4,292
Johnson	2,462	50.71%	2,313	47.64%	30	0.62%	23	0.47%	9	0.19%	149	3.07%	4,855
Kearny	175	50.29%	172	49.43%	0	0.00%	1	0.29%	0	0.00%	3	0.86%	348
Kingman	1,393	57.56%	988	40.83%	16	0.66%	12	0.50%	6	0.25%	405	16.74%	2,420
Kiowa	245	48.04%	250	49.02%	1	0.20%	3	0.59%	3	0.59%	-5	-0.98%	510
Labette	3,669	52.65%	3,206	46.01%	34	0.49%	20	0.29%	9	0.13%	463	6.64%	6,968
Lane	191	43.51%	241	54.90%	5	1.14%	2	0.46%	0	0.00%	-50	-11.39%	439
Leavenworth	4,665	53.27%	4,004	45.72%	45	0.51%	21	0.24%	4	0.05%	661	7.55%	8,758
Lincoln	1,385	63.04%	787	35.82%	8	0.36%	12	0.55%	0	0.00%	598	27.22%	2,197
Linn	2,424	52.37%	2,153	46.51%	16	0.35%	21	0.45%	3	0.06%	271	5.85%	4,629
Logan	175	38.46%	274	60.22%	2	0.44%	3	0.66%	0	0.00%	-99	-21.76%	455
Lyon	3,276	52.53%	2,860	45.86%	70	1.12%	8	0.13%	14	0.22%	416	6.67%	6,236
Marion	1,699	41.90%	2,285	56.35%	23	0.57%	26	0.64%	4	0.10%	-586	-14.45%	4,055
Marshall	2,776	46.80%	3,052	51.45%	25	0.42%	29	0.49%	16	0.27%	-276	-4.65%	5,932
McPherson	2,324	49.91%	2,269	48.73%	28	0.60%	14	0.30%	3	0.06%	55	1.18%	4,656
Meade	195	48.39%	203	50.37%	2	0.50%	1	0.25%	1	0.25%	-8	-1.99%	403
Miami	2,812	51.77%	2,541	46.78%	13	0.24%	23	0.42%	7	0.13%	271	4.99%	5,432
Mitchell	1,889	56.29%	1,428	42.55%	22	0.66%	1	0.03%	7	0.21%	461	13.74%	3,356
Montgomery	3,132	52.88%	2,714	45.82%	15	0.25%	27	0.46%	6	0.10%	418	7.06%	5,923
Morris	1,456	48.79%	1,484	49.73%	15	0.50%	15	0.50%	4	0.13%	-28	-0.94%	2,984
Morton	36	40.00%	52	57.78%	1	1.11%	0	0.00%	0	0.00%	-16	-17.78%	90
Nemaha	2,478	48.46%	2,568	50.22%	26	0.51%	11	0.22%	3	0.06%	-90	-1.76%	5,113
Neosho	2,601	53.77%	2,177	45.01%	17	0.35%	16	0.33%	4	0.08%	424	8.77%	4,837
Ness	526	57.17%	354	38.48%	16	1.74%	1	0.11%	10	1.09%	172	18.70%	920
Norton	1,260	56.12%	941	41.92%	26	1.16%	3	0.13%	9	0.40%	319	14.21%	2,245
Osage	3,481	53.65%	2,903	44.74%	48	0.74%	5	0.08%	17	0.26%	578	8.91%	6,488
Osborne	1,403	50.60%	1,325	47.78%	21	0.76%	17	0.61%	3	0.11%	78	2.81%	2,773
Ottawa	1,486	53.53%	1,256	45.24%	13	0.47%	5	0.18%	14	0.50%	230	8.29%	2,776
Pawnee	635	54.98%	499	43.20%	6	0.52%	11	0.95%	2	0.17%	136	11.77%	1,155
Phillips	1,507	51.52%	1,374	46.97%	15	0.51%	10	0.34%	4	0.14%	133	4.55%	2,925
Pottawatomie	2,276	49.20%	2,308	49.89%	13	0.28%	23	0.50%	1	0.02%	-32	-0.69%	4,626
Pratt	820	55.97%	621	42.39%	10	0.68%	2	0.14%	1	0.07%	199	13.58%	1,465
Rawlins	609	57.62%	439	41.53%	1	0.09%	2	0.19%	0	0.00%	170	16.08%	1,057
Reno	3,051	46.90%	3,373	51.84%	28	0.43%	22	0.34%	17	0.26%	-322	-4.95%	6,506
Republic	1,910	47.74%	2,033	50.81%	17	0.43%	11	0.28%	21	0.53%	-123	-3.07%	4,001
Rice	1,731	48.68%	1,729	48.62%	59	1.66%	19	0.53%	11	0.31%	2	0.06%	3,556
Riley	1,443	42.65%	1,890	55.87%	20	0.59%	20	0.59%	8	0.24%	-447	-13.21%	3,383
Rooks	971	53.41%	817	44.94%	7	0.39%	5	0.28%	12	0.66%	154	8.47%	1,818
Rush	643	54.72%	515	43.83%	4	0.34%	4	0.34%	2	0.17%	128	10.89%	1,175
Russell	823	46.76%	902	51.25%	19	1.08%	5	0.28%	0	0.00%	-79	-4.49%	1,760
Saline	2,334	57.33%	1,706	41.91%	9	0.22%	10	0.25%	3	0.07%	628	15.43%	4,071
Scott	161	63.39%	91	35.83%	1	0.39%	0	0.00%	0	0.00%	70	27.56%	254
Sedgwick	5,434	56.11%	4,122	42.57%	53	0.55%	17	0.18%	33	0.34%	1,312	13.55%	9,684
Seward	78	43.33%	100	55.56%	1	0.56%	0	0.00%	0	0.00%	-22	-12.22%	180
Shawnee	5,536	43.67%	6,958	54.89%	78	0.62%	31	0.24%	12	0.09%	-1,422	-11.22%	12,676
Sheridan	384	54.94%	282	40.34%	2	0.29%	28	4.01%	1	0.14%	102	14.59%	699
Sherman	437	59.70%	291	39.75%	2	0.27%	1	0.14%	0	0.00%	146	19.95%	732
Smith	2,019	58.45%	1,385	40.10%	29	0.84%	7	0.20%	4	0.12%	634	18.36%	3,454
Stafford	1,276	63.42%	710	35.29%	18	0.89%	1	0.05%	4	0.20%	566	28.13%	2,012
Stanton	57	50.44%	55	48.67%	0	0.00%	0	0.00%	0	0.00%	2	1.77%	113
Stevens	101	67.79%	48	32.21%	0	0.00%	0	0.00%	0	0.00%	53	35.57%	149
Sumner	3,048	54.04%	2,515	44.59%	37	0.66%	12	0.21%	7	0.12%	533	9.45%	5,640
Thomas	490	61.10%	304	37.91%	2	0.25%	2	0.25%	2	0.25%	186	23.19%	802
Trego	340	56.76%	256	42.74%	3	0.50%	0	0.00%	0	0.00%	84	14.02%	599
Wabaunsee	1,442	46.89%	1,586	51.58%	18	0.58%	12	0.39%	6	0.19%	-144	-4.68%	3,075
Wallace	124	39.87%	181	58.20%	0	0.00%	0	0.00%	0	0.00%	-57	-18.33%	311
Washington	2,391	47.98%	2,514	50.45%	11	0.22%	39	0.78%	8	0.16%	-123	-2.47%	4,983
Wichita	192	46.94%	214	52.32%	3	0.74%	0	0.00%	0	0.00%	-22	-5.38%	409
Wilson	1,959	51.04%	1,852	48.25%	7	0.18%	7	0.18%	3	0.08%	107	2.79%	3,838
Woodson	1,189	47.33%	1,288	51.27%	10	0.40%	7	0.28%	4	0.16%	-99	-3.94%	2,512
Wyandotte	6,882	49.38%	6,852	49.16%	30	0.22%	80	0.57%	17	0.12%	30	0.22%	13,938
Totals	171,774	51.12%	159,484	47.46%	1,723	0.51%	1,209	0.36%	620	0.18%	12,290	3.66%	336,050

== See also ==
- United States presidential elections in Kansas
