= 1900 United States presidential election in Kansas =

- November 6, 1900
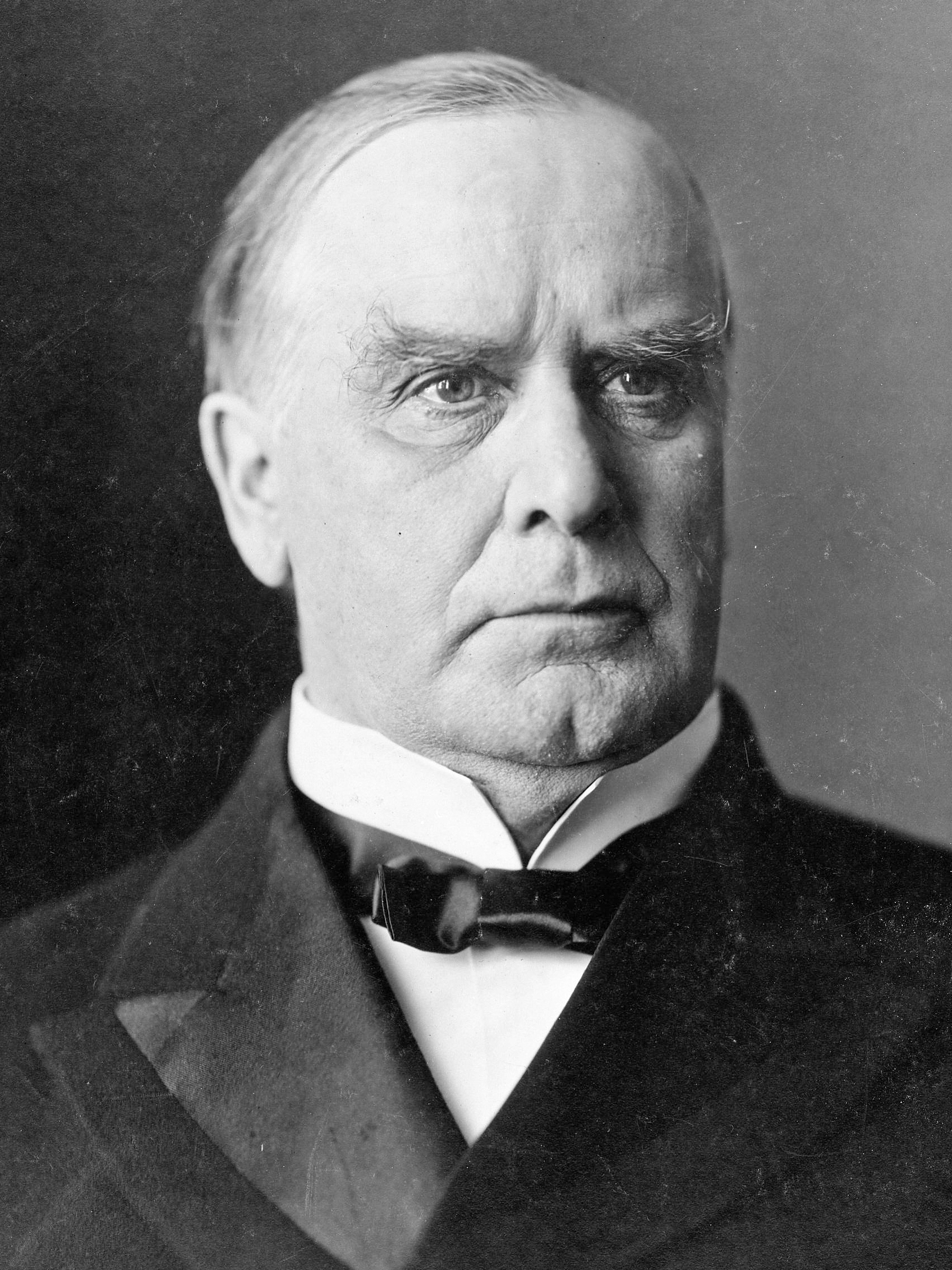

Nominee	William McKinley	William Jennings Bryan
Party	Republican	Democratic
Home state	Ohio	Nebraska
Running mate	Theodore Roosevelt	Adlai Stevenson I
Electoral vote	10	0
Popular vote	185,955	162,601
Percentage	52.56%	45.96%
County results
McKinley
40–50%
50–60%
60–70%
70–80%
Bryan
40–50%
50–60%
60–70%
President before election
William McKinley
Republican
Elected President
William McKinley
Republican

The 1900 United States presidential election in Kansas took place on November 6, 1900. All contemporary 45 states were part of the 1900 United States presidential election. Kansas voters chose ten electors to the Electoral College, which selected the president and vice president.

Kansas was won by the Republican nominees, incumbent President William McKinley of Ohio and his running mate Theodore Roosevelt of New York. They defeated the Democratic nominees, former U.S. Representative and 1896 Democratic presidential nominee William Jennings Bryan and his running mate, former Vice President Adlai Stevenson I. McKinley won the state by a margin of 6.60% in this rematch of the 1896 presidential election. The return of economic prosperity and recent victory in the Spanish–American War helped McKinley to score a decisive victory.

McKinley had previously lost the state to Bryan four years earlier while Bryan would later lose the state again to another Republican (William Howard Taft) in 1908.

== Results ==
1900 United States presidential election in Kansas
Party	Candidate	Votes	Percentage	Electoral votes
Republican	William McKinley (incumbent)	185,955	52.56%	10
Democratic	William Jennings Bryan	162,601	45.96%	0
Prohibition	John G. Woolley	3,605	1.02%	0
Social Democratic	Eugene V. Debs	1,605	0.45%	0
Totals		353,766	100.00%	10
Voter turnout				—

=== Results by county ===
1900 United States presidential election in Kansas by county
County	William McKinley Republican		William Jennings Bryan Democratic		John Granville Woolley Prohibition		Eugene Victor Debs Socialist		Margin		Total votes cast
County	#	%	#	%	#	%	#	%	#	%	Total votes cast
Allen	2,680	55.57%	2,073	42.98%	49	1.02%	21	0.44%	607	12.59%	4,823
Anderson	1,846	50.40%	1,757	47.97%	52	1.42%	8	0.22%	89	2.43%	3,663
Atchison	3,390	55.54%	2,682	43.94%	24	0.39%	8	0.13%	708	11.60%	6,104
Barber	862	51.16%	783	46.47%	25	1.48%	15	0.89%	79	4.69%	1,685
Barton	1,564	46.46%	1,772	52.64%	21	0.62%	9	0.27%	-208	-6.18%	3,366
Bourbon	3,024	51.36%	2,799	47.54%	30	0.51%	35	0.59%	225	3.82%	5,888
Brown	3,137	57.01%	2,307	41.92%	53	0.96%	6	0.11%	830	15.08%	5,503
Butler	2,947	50.64%	2,752	47.29%	94	1.62%	26	0.45%	195	3.35%	5,819
Chase	1,084	52.49%	956	46.30%	21	1.02%	4	0.19%	128	6.20%	2,065
Chautauqua	1,618	55.47%	1,280	43.88%	11	0.38%	8	0.27%	338	11.59%	2,917
Cherokee	4,478	45.18%	5,302	53.50%	55	0.55%	76	0.77%	-824	-8.31%	9,911
Cheyenne	348	54.12%	286	44.48%	5	0.78%	4	0.62%	62	9.64%	643
Clark	201	49.14%	199	48.66%	8	1.96%	1	0.24%	2	0.49%	409
Clay	2,001	51.47%	1,826	46.97%	56	1.44%	5	0.13%	175	4.50%	3,888
Cloud	2,315	51.87%	2,045	45.82%	59	1.32%	44	0.99%	270	6.05%	4,463
Coffey	2,159	50.46%	2,066	48.28%	48	1.12%	6	0.14%	93	2.17%	4,279
Comanche	249	54.85%	194	42.73%	8	1.76%	3	0.66%	55	12.11%	454
Cowley	3,679	50.47%	3,436	47.14%	138	1.89%	36	0.49%	243	3.33%	7,289
Crawford	4,722	48.66%	4,824	49.71%	48	0.49%	110	1.13%	-102	-1.05%	9,704
Decatur	848	41.77%	1,158	57.04%	12	0.59%	12	0.59%	-310	-15.27%	2,030
Dickinson	2,771	52.93%	2,352	44.93%	47	0.90%	65	1.24%	419	8.00%	5,235
Doniphan	2,464	65.92%	1,244	33.28%	12	0.32%	18	0.48%	1,220	32.64%	3,738
Douglas	3,453	58.56%	2,333	39.56%	96	1.63%	15	0.25%	1,120	18.99%	5,897
Edwards	523	50.10%	502	48.08%	14	1.34%	5	0.48%	21	2.01%	1,044
Elk	1,632	55.21%	1,311	44.35%	7	0.24%	6	0.20%	321	10.86%	2,956
Ellis	627	33.55%	1,228	65.70%	9	0.48%	5	0.27%	-601	-32.16%	1,869
Ellsworth	1,333	56.68%	1,006	42.77%	12	0.51%	1	0.04%	327	13.90%	2,352
Finney	525	59.86%	336	38.31%	7	0.80%	9	1.03%	189	21.55%	877
Ford	653	50.46%	610	47.14%	24	1.85%	7	0.54%	43	3.32%	1,294
Franklin	2,842	51.29%	2,605	47.01%	82	1.48%	12	0.22%	237	4.28%	5,541
Geary	1,240	54.55%	1,009	44.39%	11	0.48%	13	0.57%	231	10.16%	2,273
Gove	368	58.41%	253	40.16%	3	0.48%	6	0.95%	115	18.25%	630
Graham	561	44.03%	694	54.47%	12	0.94%	7	0.55%	-133	-10.44%	1,274
Grant	58	51.79%	53	47.32%	1	0.89%	0	0.00%	5	4.46%	112
Gray	188	55.79%	145	43.03%	2	0.59%	2	0.59%	43	12.76%	337
Greeley	118	75.64%	36	23.08%	2	1.28%	0	0.00%	82	52.56%	156
Greenwood	2,204	53.28%	1,917	46.34%	11	0.27%	5	0.12%	287	6.94%	4,137
Hamilton	182	46.31%	194	49.36%	17	4.33%	0	0.00%	-12	-3.05%	393
Harper	1,190	47.04%	1,261	49.84%	66	2.61%	13	0.51%	-71	-2.81%	2,530
Harvey	2,266	56.65%	1,658	41.45%	58	1.45%	18	0.45%	608	15.20%	4,000
Haskell	79	64.23%	44	35.77%	0	0.00%	0	0.00%	35	28.46%	123
Hodgeman	323	56.27%	245	42.68%	6	1.05%	0	0.00%	78	13.59%	574
Jackson	2,291	56.17%	1,745	42.78%	39	0.96%	4	0.10%	546	13.39%	4,079
Jefferson	2,374	54.66%	1,912	44.02%	44	1.01%	13	0.30%	462	10.64%	4,343
Jewell	2,448	51.96%	2,192	46.53%	67	1.42%	4	0.08%	256	5.43%	4,711
Johnson	2,393	51.58%	2,171	46.80%	28	0.60%	47	1.01%	222	4.79%	4,639
Kearny	164	53.77%	137	44.92%	3	0.98%	1	0.33%	27	8.85%	305
Kingman	1,286	50.79%	1,183	46.72%	40	1.58%	23	0.91%	103	4.07%	2,532
Kiowa	322	51.52%	293	46.88%	10	1.60%	0	0.00%	29	4.64%	625
Labette	3,319	48.77%	3,425	50.33%	43	0.63%	18	0.26%	-106	-1.56%	6,805
Lane	239	56.50%	172	40.66%	12	2.84%	0	0.00%	67	15.84%	423
Leavenworth	4,162	49.84%	4,109	49.20%	49	0.59%	31	0.37%	53	0.63%	8,351
Lincoln	1,110	46.44%	1,250	52.30%	22	0.92%	8	0.33%	-140	-5.86%	2,390
Linn	2,279	52.23%	2,043	46.83%	27	0.62%	14	0.32%	236	5.41%	4,363
Logan	319	60.53%	176	33.40%	9	1.71%	23	4.36%	143	27.13%	527
Lyon	3,083	50.72%	2,865	47.13%	113	1.86%	18	0.30%	218	3.59%	6,079
Marion	2,623	59.67%	1,729	39.33%	38	0.86%	6	0.14%	894	20.34%	4,396
Marshall	3,413	55.63%	2,669	43.50%	47	0.77%	6	0.10%	744	12.13%	6,135
McPherson	2,640	54.61%	2,121	43.88%	70	1.45%	3	0.06%	519	10.74%	4,834
Meade	238	53.24%	209	46.76%	0	0.00%	0	0.00%	29	6.49%	447
Miami	2,663	52.27%	2,401	47.12%	9	0.18%	22	0.43%	262	5.14%	5,095
Mitchell	1,764	49.65%	1,702	47.90%	54	1.52%	33	0.93%	62	1.75%	3,553
Montgomery	3,433	51.28%	3,213	48.00%	30	0.45%	18	0.27%	220	3.29%	6,694
Morris	1,650	55.15%	1,326	44.32%	9	0.30%	7	0.23%	324	10.83%	2,992
Morton	51	60.00%	34	40.00%	0	0.00%	0	0.00%	17	20.00%	85
Nemaha	2,761	53.45%	2,348	45.45%	49	0.95%	8	0.15%	413	7.99%	5,166
Neosho	2,424	50.94%	2,279	47.89%	23	0.48%	33	0.69%	145	3.05%	4,759
Ness	511	44.90%	583	51.23%	32	2.81%	12	1.05%	-72	-6.33%	1,138
Norton	1,329	51.67%	1,212	47.12%	29	1.13%	2	0.08%	117	4.55%	2,572
Osage	3,128	51.16%	2,901	47.45%	68	1.11%	17	0.28%	227	3.71%	6,114
Osborne	1,555	54.43%	1,239	43.37%	62	2.17%	1	0.04%	316	11.06%	2,857
Ottawa	1,509	51.61%	1,367	46.75%	35	1.20%	13	0.44%	142	4.86%	2,924
Pawnee	684	48.00%	727	51.02%	7	0.49%	7	0.49%	-43	-3.02%	1,425
Phillips	1,691	52.26%	1,511	46.69%	26	0.80%	8	0.25%	180	5.56%	3,236
Pottawatomie	2,556	56.41%	1,929	42.57%	39	0.86%	7	0.15%	627	13.84%	4,531
Pratt	821	49.04%	816	48.75%	30	1.79%	7	0.42%	5	0.30%	1,674
Rawlins	577	45.90%	668	53.14%	7	0.56%	5	0.40%	-91	-7.24%	1,257
Reno	3,769	56.02%	2,859	42.49%	76	1.13%	24	0.36%	910	13.53%	6,728
Republic	2,499	55.67%	1,925	42.88%	53	1.18%	12	0.27%	574	12.79%	4,489
Rice	2,013	54.42%	1,527	41.28%	130	3.51%	29	0.78%	486	13.14%	3,699
Riley	2,119	61.69%	1,279	37.23%	30	0.87%	7	0.20%	840	24.45%	3,435
Rooks	927	49.28%	925	49.18%	29	1.54%	0	0.00%	2	0.11%	1,881
Rush	681	48.47%	717	51.03%	6	0.43%	1	0.07%	-36	-2.56%	1,405
Russell	1,233	59.71%	810	39.23%	15	0.73%	7	0.34%	423	20.48%	2,065
Saline	2,245	49.67%	2,199	48.65%	39	0.86%	37	0.82%	46	1.02%	4,520
Scott	128	44.14%	159	54.83%	3	1.03%	0	0.00%	-31	-10.69%	290
Sedgwick	5,363	50.03%	5,144	47.99%	155	1.45%	57	0.53%	219	2.04%	10,719
Seward	122	60.40%	77	38.12%	3	1.49%	0	0.00%	45	22.28%	202
Shawnee	7,667	60.28%	4,875	38.33%	127	1.00%	50	0.39%	2,792	21.95%	12,719
Sheridan	445	46.31%	499	51.93%	10	1.04%	7	0.73%	-54	-5.62%	961
Sherman	380	46.51%	418	51.16%	5	0.61%	14	1.71%	-38	-4.65%	817
Smith	1,770	46.47%	1,978	51.93%	60	1.58%	1	0.03%	-208	-5.46%	3,809
Stafford	1,055	46.81%	1,139	50.53%	54	2.40%	6	0.27%	-84	-3.73%	2,254
Stanton	50	57.47%	36	41.38%	1	1.15%	0	0.00%	14	16.09%	87
Stevens	66	42.31%	89	57.05%	1	0.64%	0	0.00%	-23	-14.74%	156
Sumner	3,184	50.61%	2,982	47.40%	106	1.68%	19	0.30%	202	3.21%	6,291
Thomas	404	41.95%	551	57.22%	4	0.42%	4	0.42%	-147	-15.26%	963
Trego	360	48.39%	361	48.52%	21	2.82%	2	0.27%	-1	-0.13%	744
Wabaunsee	1,793	58.06%	1,263	40.90%	28	0.91%	4	0.13%	530	17.16%	3,088
Wallace	212	66.25%	102	31.88%	6	1.88%	0	0.00%	110	34.38%	320
Washington	2,960	56.02%	2,252	42.62%	47	0.89%	25	0.47%	708	13.40%	5,284
Wichita	201	60.36%	128	38.44%	0	0.00%	4	1.20%	73	21.92%	333
Wilson	2,193	55.58%	1,711	43.36%	17	0.43%	25	0.63%	482	12.21%	3,946
Woodson	1,418	55.54%	1,115	43.67%	16	0.63%	4	0.16%	303	11.87%	2,553
Wyandotte	8,133	51.75%	7,304	46.47%	77	0.49%	203	1.29%	829	5.27%	15,717
Totals	185,952	52.56%	162,614	45.97%	3,605	1.02%	1,605	0.45%	23,338	6.60%	353,776

== See also ==
- United States presidential elections in Kansas
