= Manter, Kansas =

City in Stanton County, Kansas

- City
- Location with Stanton County and Kansas

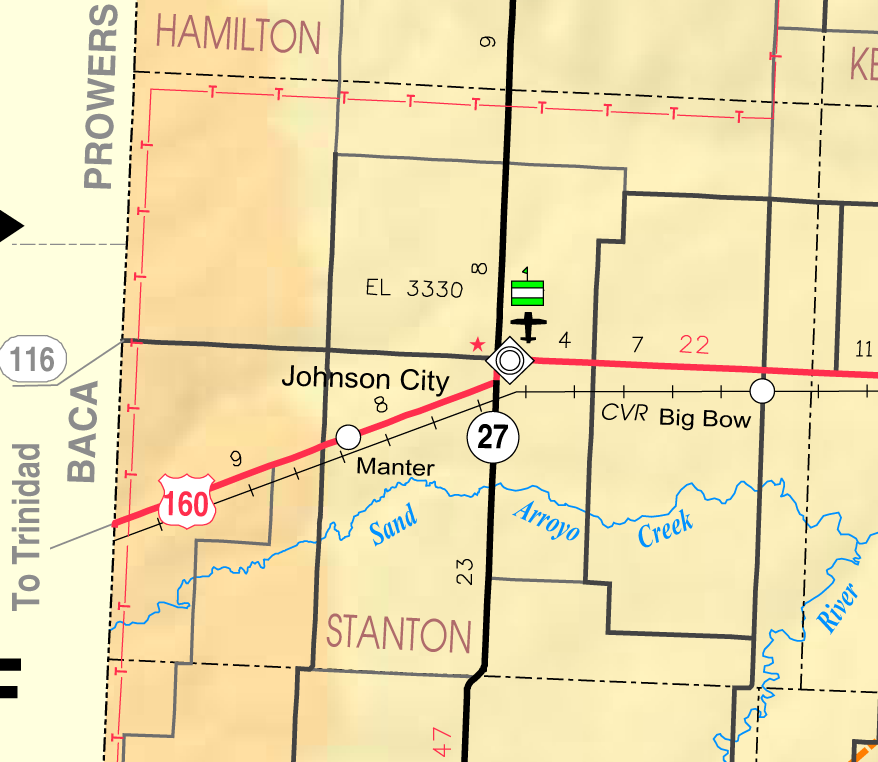
- KDOT map of Stanton County (legend)
- Coordinates: 37°31′30″N 101°52′59″W
- Country: United States
- State: Kansas
- County: Stanton
- Incorporated: 1924

Area
  - Total: 0.24 sq mi (0.63 km^{2})
  - Land: 0.24 sq mi (0.63 km^{2})
  - Water: 0 sq mi (0.00 km^{2})
- Elevation: 3,491 ft (1,064 m)

Population (2020)
  - Total: 132
  - Density: 540/sq mi (210/km^{2})
- Time zone: UTC-6 (CST)
  - Summer (DST): UTC-5 (CDT)
- ZIP Code: 67862
- Area code: 620
- FIPS code: 20-44375
- GNIS ID: 2395836

Manter is a city in Stanton County, Kansas, United States. As of the 2020 census, the population of the city was 132.

== History ==
The first post office in Manter was established in 1923.

== Geography ==
According to the United States Census Bureau, the city has a total area of 0.24 square miles (0.62 km^{2}), all land.

== Demographics ==
Historical population
Census	Pop.	Note	%±
1930	224		—
1940	133		−40.6%
1950	200		50.4%
1960	183		−8.5%
1970	219		19.7%
1980	205		−6.4%
1990	186		−9.3%
2000	178		−4.3%
2010	171		−3.9%
2020	132		−22.8%
U.S. Decennial Census

=== 2020 census ===
The 2020 United States census counted 132 people, 64 households, and 48 families in Manter. The population density was 530.1 per square mile (204.7/km^{2}). There were 83 housing units at an average density of 333.3 per square mile (128.7/km^{2}). The racial makeup was 82.58% (109) white or European American (64.39% non-Hispanic white), 0.0% (0) black or African-American, 2.27% (3) Native American or Alaska Native, 0.0% (0) Asian, 0.76% (1) Pacific Islander or Native Hawaiian, 0.0% (0) from other races, and 14.39% (19) from two or more races. Hispanic or Latino of any race was 25.0% (33) of the population.

Of the 64 households, 43.8% had children under the age of 18; 48.4% were married couples living together; 12.5% had a female householder with no spouse or partner present. 20.3% of households consisted of individuals and 4.7% had someone living alone who was 65 years of age or older. The average household size was 4.0 and the average family size was 5.3. The percent of those with a bachelor's degree or higher was estimated to be 29.5% of the population.

25.8% of the population was under the age of 18, 5.3% from 18 to 24, 22.7% from 25 to 44, 30.3% from 45 to 64, and 15.9% who were 65 years of age or older. The median age was 42.0 years. For every 100 females, there were 73.7 males. For every 100 females ages 18 and older, there were 78.2 males.

The 2016–2020 5-year American Community Survey estimates show that the median household income was $54,531 (with a margin of error of +/- $14,067) and the median family income was $54,531 (+/- $17,927). Males had a median income of $31,250 (+/- $26,837)s. The median income for those above 16 years old was $28,750 (+/- $18,411). Approximately, 14.0% of families and 15.7% of the population were below the poverty line, including 21.8% of those under the age of 18 and 0.0% of those ages 65 or over.

=== 2010 census ===
As of the census of 2010, there were 171 people, 73 households, and 47 families residing in the city. The population density was 712.5 inhabitants per square mile (275.1/km^{2}). There were 92 housing units at an average density of 383.3 per square mile (148.0/km^{2}). The racial makeup of the city was 91.8% White, 2.3% Native American, 4.1% from other races, and 1.8% from two or more races. Hispanic or Latino of any race were 19.9% of the population.

There were 73 households, of which 30.1% had children under the age of 18 living with them, 50.7% were married couples living together, 9.6% had a female householder with no husband present, 4.1% had a male householder with no wife present, and 35.6% were non-families. 31.5% of all households were made up of individuals, and 10.9% had someone living alone who was 65 years of age or older. The average household size was 2.34 and the average family size was 3.00.

The median age in the city was 39.8 years. 28.7% of residents were under the age of 18; 2.8% were between the ages of 18 and 24; 22.8% were from 25 to 44; 26.3% were from 45 to 64; and 19.3% were 65 years of age or older. The gender makeup of the city was 48.0% male and 52.0% female.
