= Julian, Kansas =

- Unincorporated community
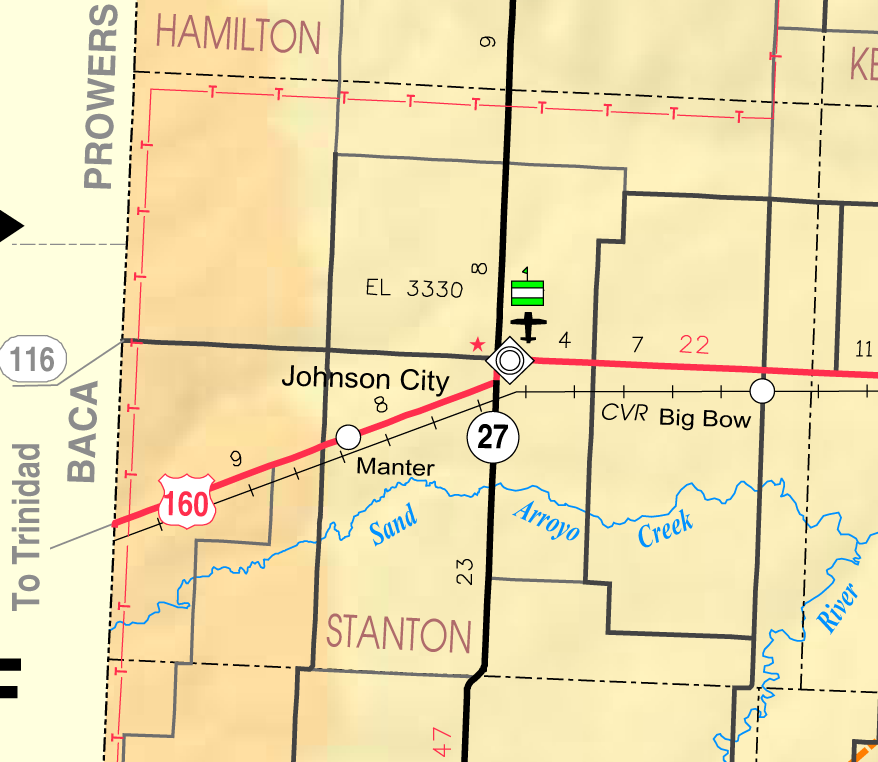
- KDOT map of Stanton County (legend)

- Location within Kansas Location within the United States
- Coordinates: 37°33′43″N 101°37′36″W
- Country: United States
- State: Kansas
- County: Stanton
- Elevation: 3,225 ft (983 m)
- Time zone: UTC-6 (CST)
  - Summer (DST): UTC-5 (CDT)
- Area code: 620
- FIPS code: 20-35700
- GNIS ID: 484961

Julian is an unincorporated community in Stanton County, Kansas, United States.
