= Johnson City, Kansas =

City in Stanton County, Kansas

- City and County seat
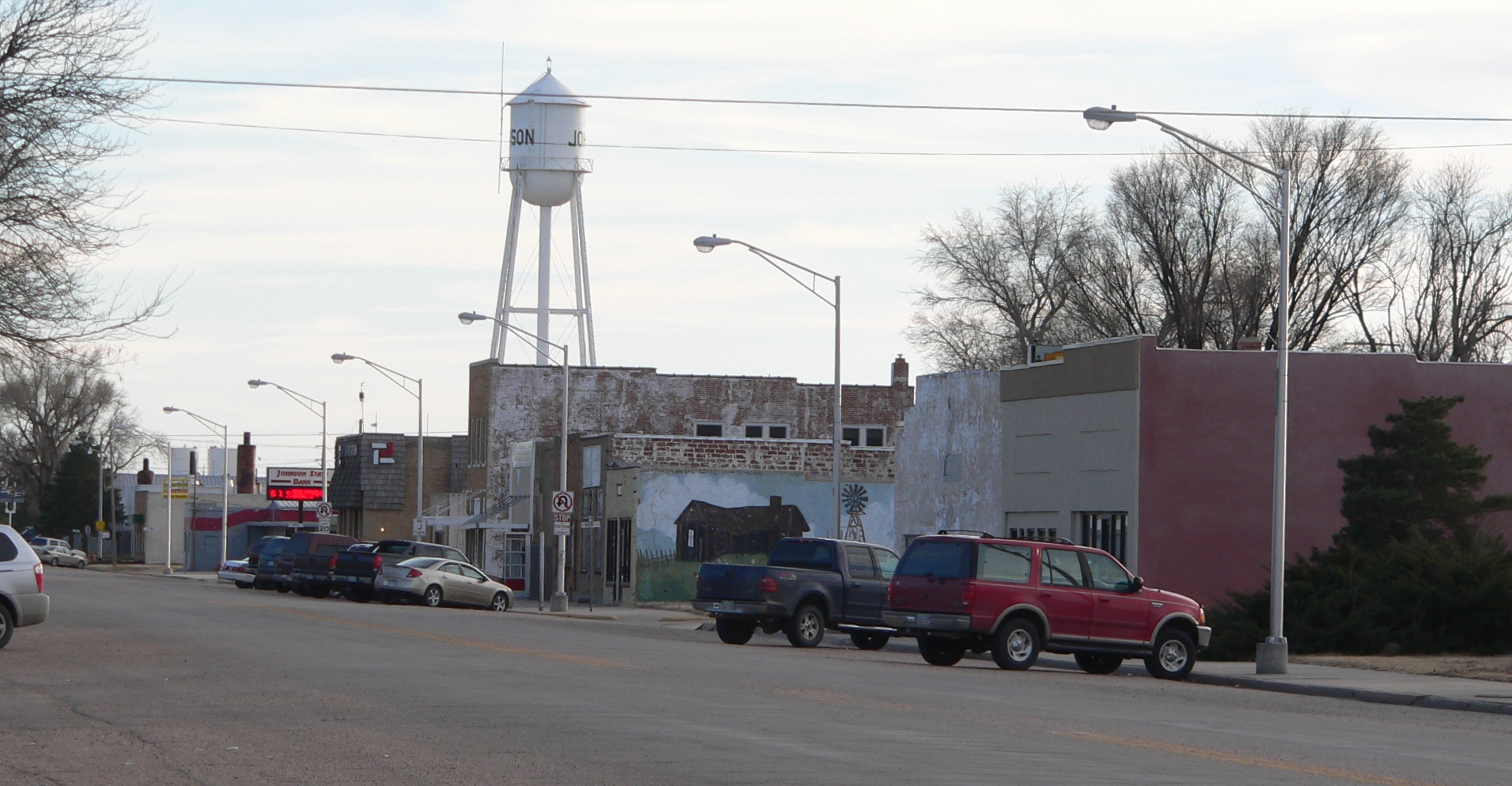
- Downtown Main Street (facing south) (2010)

- Location with Stanton County and Kansas

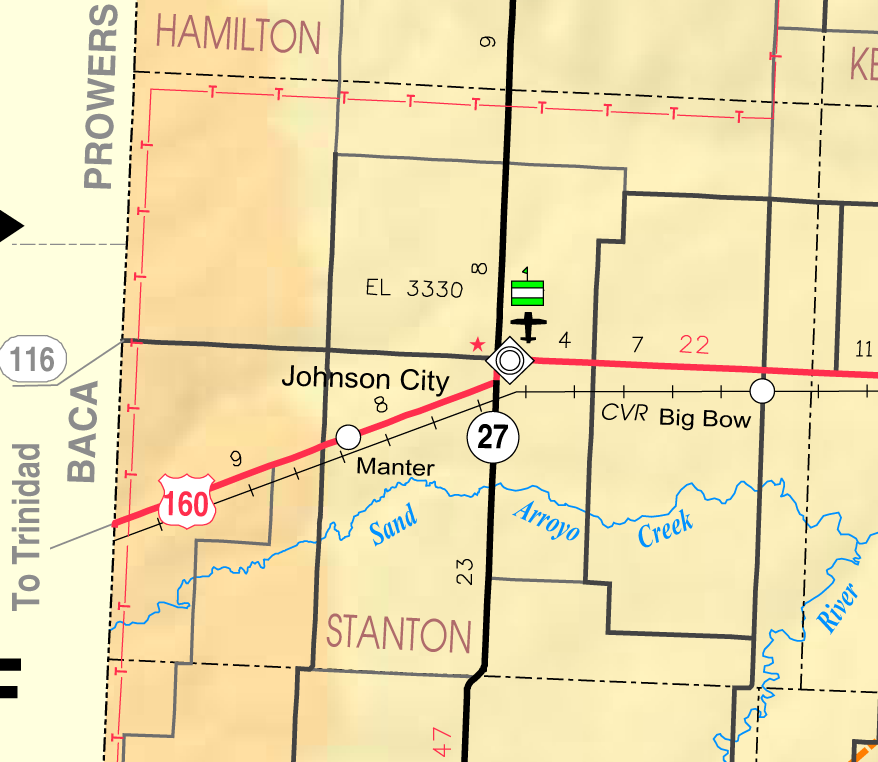
- KDOT map of Stanton County (legend)
- Coordinates: 37°34′14″N 101°45′10″W
- Country: United States
- State: Kansas
- County: Stanton
- Founded: 1885
- Incorporated: 1888
- Named for: A.S. Johnson

Area
  - Total: 2.14 sq mi (5.55 km^{2})
  - Land: 2.14 sq mi (5.55 km^{2})
  - Water: 0 sq mi (0.00 km^{2})
- Elevation: 3,333 ft (1,016 m)

Population (2020)
  - Total: 1,464
  - Density: 683/sq mi (264/km^{2})
- Time zone: UTC-6 (CST)
  - Summer (DST): UTC-5 (CDT)
- ZIP Code: 67855
- Area code: 620
- FIPS code: 20-35575
- GNIS ID: 2395473
- Website: johnsoncityks.com

Johnson City is a city in and the county seat of Stanton County, Kansas, United States. As of the 2020 census, the population of the city was 1,464.

== History ==
Johnson City was established in 1885; it was originally called Veteran because many of its founders were Civil War veterans. It was renamed Johnson City in 1886, in honor of A. S. Johnson, a railroad official.

== Geography ==
According to the United States Census Bureau, the city has a total area of 2.01 square miles (5.21 km^{2}), all land.

=== Climate ===
According to the Köppen Climate Classification system, Johnson City has a semi-arid climate, abbreviated "BSk" on climate maps.

Climate data for Johnson City, Kansas (1991–2020 normals, extremes 1995–present)
Month	Jan	Feb	Mar	Apr	May	Jun	Jul	Aug	Sep	Oct	Nov	Dec	Year
Record high °F (°C)	82 (28)	88 (31)	101 (38)	96 (36)	104 (40)	109 (43)	110 (43)	106 (41)	106 (41)	99 (37)	90 (32)	82 (28)	110 (43)
Mean daily maximum °F (°C)	47.4 (8.6)	51.0 (10.6)	60.3 (15.7)	68.4 (20.2)	78.4 (25.8)	89.0 (31.7)	93.4 (34.1)	90.5 (32.5)	84.0 (28.9)	71.5 (21.9)	58.4 (14.7)	47.6 (8.7)	70.0 (21.1)
Daily mean °F (°C)	33.8 (1.0)	36.8 (2.7)	45.2 (7.3)	53.5 (11.9)	64.0 (17.8)	74.8 (23.8)	79.5 (26.4)	77.2 (25.1)	69.6 (20.9)	56.4 (13.6)	44.2 (6.8)	34.5 (1.4)	55.8 (13.2)
Mean daily minimum °F (°C)	20.2 (−6.6)	22.7 (−5.2)	30.1 (−1.1)	38.5 (3.6)	49.6 (9.8)	60.6 (15.9)	65.7 (18.7)	63.9 (17.7)	55.2 (12.9)	41.3 (5.2)	29.9 (−1.2)	21.5 (−5.8)	41.6 (5.3)
Record low °F (°C)	−6 (−21)	−18 (−28)	−3 (−19)	13 (−11)	27 (−3)	42 (6)	51 (11)	51 (11)	31 (−1)	7 (−14)	2 (−17)	−16 (−27)	−18 (−28)
Average precipitation inches (mm)	0.51 (13)	0.34 (8.6)	0.97 (25)	1.46 (37)	2.01 (51)	2.19 (56)	2.86 (73)	3.02 (77)	1.37 (35)	1.55 (39)	0.51 (13)	0.68 (17)	17.47 (444)
Average snowfall inches (cm)	5.8 (15)	3.2 (8.1)	4.7 (12)	0.9 (2.3)	0.0 (0.0)	0.0 (0.0)	0.0 (0.0)	0.0 (0.0)	0.0 (0.0)	0.7 (1.8)	1.3 (3.3)	5.3 (13)	21.9 (56)
Average precipitation days (≥ 0.01 in)	2.5	3.0	4.2	5.7	6.6	6.9	8.6	6.7	4.0	4.2	2.4	3.1	57.9
Average snowy days (≥ 0.1 in)	1.9	2.0	1.8	0.4	0.0	0.0	0.0	0.0	0.0	0.2	0.8	2.6	9.7
Source: NOAA

== Demographics ==
Historical population
Census	Pop.	Note	%±
1890	143		—
1930	514		—
1940	524		1.9%
1950	994		89.7%
1960	860		−13.5%
1970	1,038		20.7%
1980	1,244		19.8%
1990	1,348		8.4%
2000	1,528		13.4%
2010	1,495		−2.2%
2020	1,464		−2.1%
U.S. Decennial Census

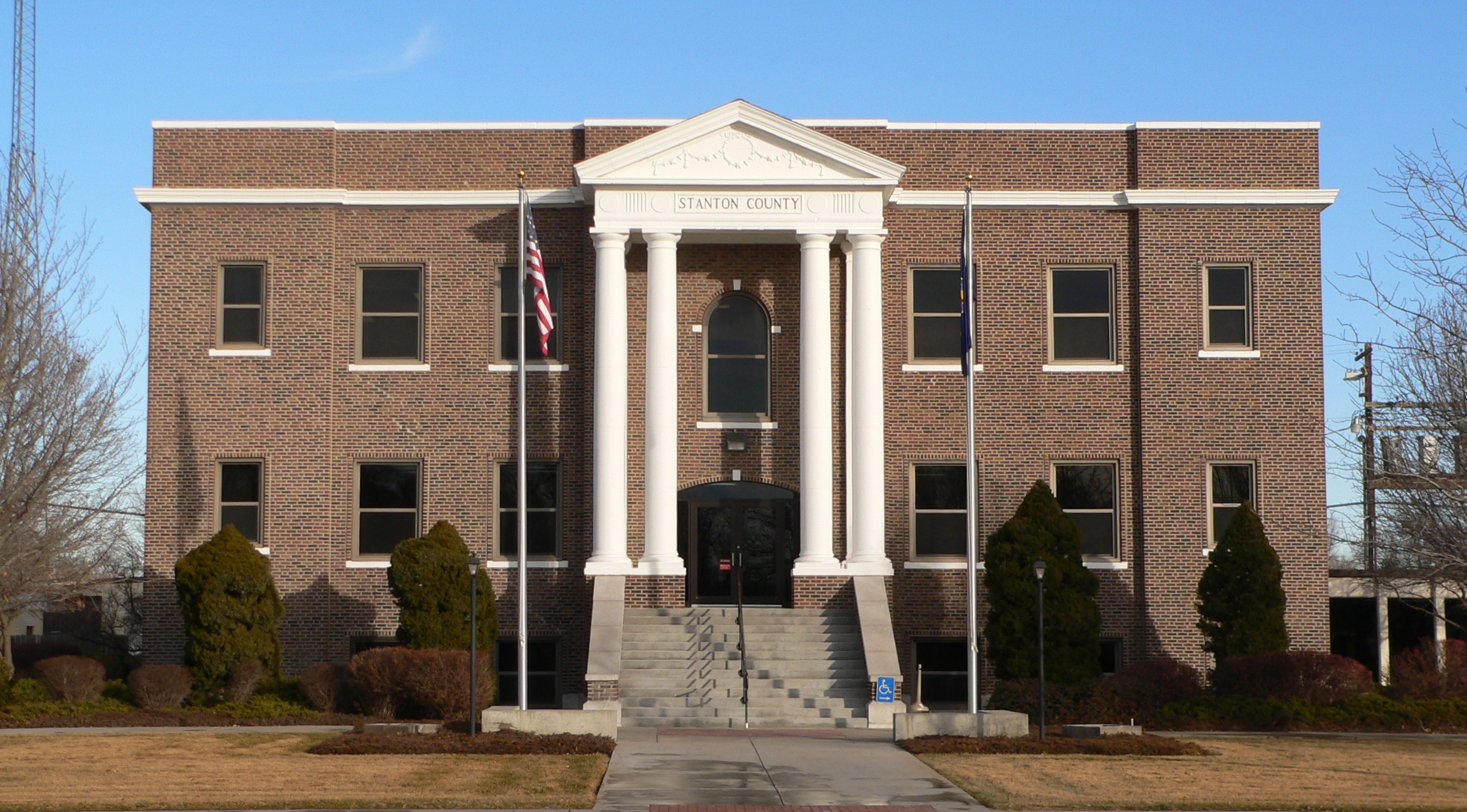
Stanton County courthouse (2010)

=== 2020 census ===
The 2020 United States census counted 1,464 people, 531 households, and 366 families in Johnson City. The population density was 683.5 per square mile (263.9/km^{2}). There were 607 housing units at an average density of 283.4 per square mile (109.4/km^{2}). The racial makeup was 50.55% (740) white or European American (42.62% non-Hispanic white), 0.27% (4) Black or African-American, 2.19% (32) Native American or Alaska Native, 0.07% (1) Asian, 0.0% (0) Pacific Islander or Native Hawaiian, 28.83% (422) from other races, and 18.1% (265) from two or more races. Hispanic or Latino of any race was 53.07% (777) of the population.

Of the 531 households, 36.9% had children under the age of 18; 51.0% were married couples living together; 26.4% had a female householder with no spouse or partner present. 27.3% of households consisted of individuals and 12.4% had someone living alone who was 65 years of age or older. The average household size was 2.1 and the average family size was 2.8. The percent of those with a bachelor's degree or higher was estimated to be 5.2% of the population.

28.6% of the population was under the age of 18, 9.5% from 18 to 24, 26.2% from 25 to 44, 20.2% from 45 to 64, and 15.4% who were 65 years of age or older. The median age was 34.4 years. For every 100 females, there were 98.4 males. For every 100 females ages 18 and older, there were 101.0 males.

The 2016–2020 5-year American Community Survey estimates show that the median household income was $57,851 (with a margin of error of +/- $7,470) and the median family income was $54,531 (+/- $28,504). Males had a median income of $33,578 (+/- $8,860) versus $30,611 (+/- $11,337) for females. The median income for those above 16 years old was $31,573 (+/- $4,563). Approximately, 9.8% of families and 10.1% of the population were below the poverty line, including 29.6% of those under the age of 18 and 0.0% of those ages 65 or over.

=== 2010 census ===
As of the census of 2010, there were 1,495 people, 533 households, and 381 families residing in the city. The population density was 743.8 inhabitants per square mile (287.2/km^{2}). There were 609 housing units at an average density of 303.0 per square mile (117.0/km^{2}). The racial makeup of the city was 79.3% White, 0.8% African American, 1.4% Native American, 0.2% Asian, 15.9% from other races, and 2.5% from two or more races. Hispanic or Latino of any race were 44.3% of the population.

There were 533 households, of which 40.9% had children under the age of 18 living with them, 60.4% were married couples living together, 7.5% had a female householder with no husband present, 3.6% had a male householder with no wife present, and 28.5% were non-families. 25.5% of all households were made up of individuals, and 12.4% had someone living alone who was 65 years of age or older. The average household size was 2.72 and the average family size was 3.29.

The median age in the city was 33.9 years. 29.8% of residents were under the age of 18; 8.4% were between the ages of 18 and 24; 26.8% were from 25 to 44; 21.2% were from 45 to 64; and 13.8% were 65 years of age or older. The gender makeup of the city was 50.2% male and 49.8% female.

== Area attractions ==
- Stanton County Museum

== Education ==
The community is served by Stanton County USD 452 public school district. Stanton County High School mascot is Stanton County Trojans.

Prior to school unification, Johnson High School also used the mascot Trojans.

== Transportation ==
Johnson City is bordered by two highways. U.S. Highway 160 runs east–west just north of Johnson City. State Highway 27/U.S. Highway 160 runs north–south along the west side of Johnson City. The nearest airport is Stanton County Municipal Airport. It is located 21 miles north of Richfield, about 6.5 miles east of Manter, 20.5 miles west of Ulysses, and 26 miles south of Syracuse.
