= Saunders, Stanton County, Kansas =

Saunders, Kansas
- Unincorporated community
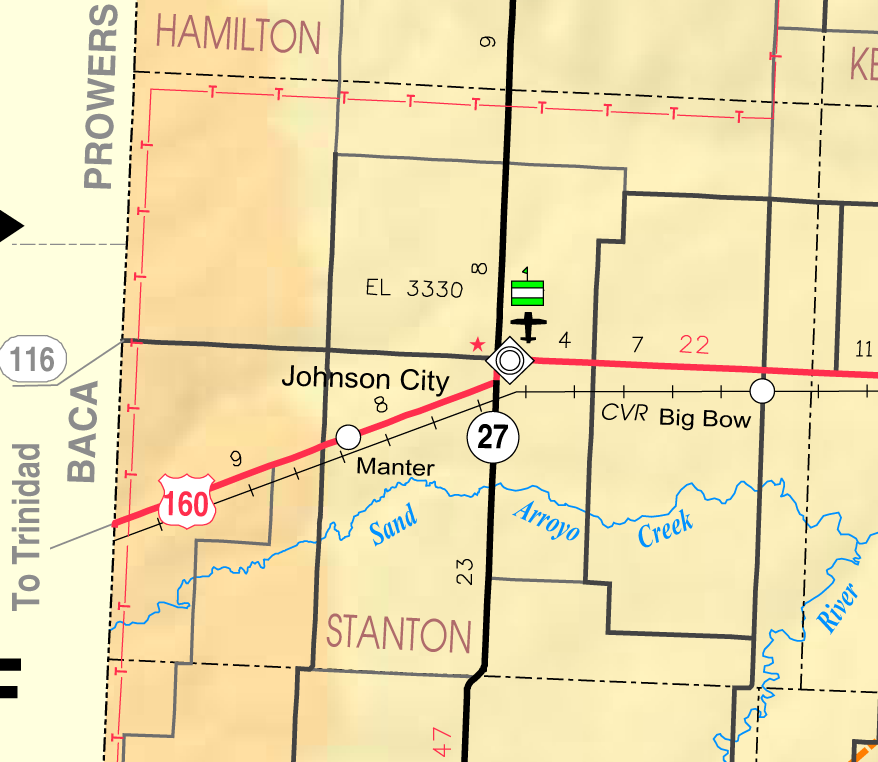
- KDOT map of Stanton County (legend)

- Location within Kansas Location within the United States
- Coordinates: 37°28′16″N 102°2′22″W
- Country: United States
- State: Kansas
- County: Stanton
- Elevation: 3,658 ft (1,115 m)
- Time zone: UTC-6 (CST)
  - Summer (DST): UTC-5 (CDT)
- Area code: 620
- FIPS code: 20-63175
- GNIS ID: 484533

Saunders is an unincorporated community in Stanton County, Kansas, United States.
