= Bear Creek (Kansas) =

River in the United States

Location
- Country: United States
- State: Kansas
- Region: High Plains

Physical characteristics
- Source
  - location: Western Baca County, High Plains, Colorado, United States
  - coordinates: 37°22′05″N 102°59′59″W
  - elevation: 3,051 ft (930 m)
- Mouth: Arkansas River
  - location: Near Lakin, Kansas, United States
  - coordinates: 37°50′42″N 101°19′21″W
  - elevation: 93 ft (28 m)

Basin features
- River system: Arkansas River watershed

Bear Creek is a tributary of the Arkansas River and has its headwaters in Baca County, Colorado. It flows through Baca County into Kansas and through Stanton and Grant Counties and into Kearny County where it converges with the Arkansas River about 8 miles southwest of Lakin, Kansas.

== See also ==
- List of rivers of Colorado
- List of rivers of Kansas
