= Big Bow, Kansas =

Unincorporated community in Stanton County, Kansas

- CDP
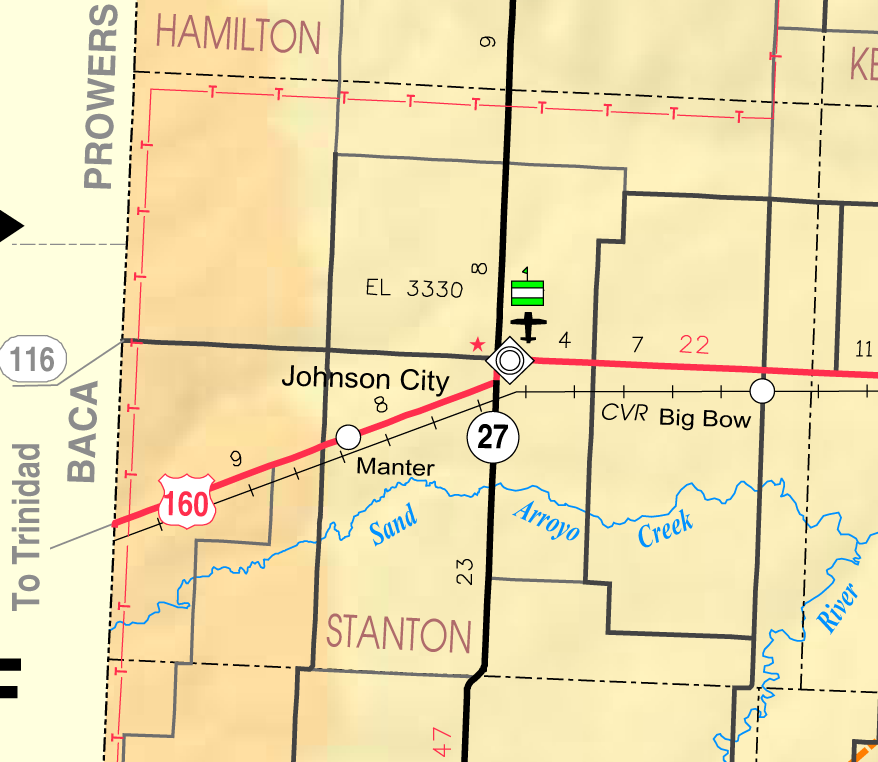
- KDOT map of Stanton County (legend)

- Location within Kansas Location within the United States
- Coordinates: 37°33′54″N 101°33′42″W
- Country: United States
- State: Kansas
- County: Stanton
- Elevation: 3,176 ft (968 m)

Population (2020)
  - Total: 32
- Time zone: UTC-6 (CST)
  - Summer (DST): UTC-5 (CDT)
- Area code: 620
- FIPS code: 20-06575
- GNIS ID: 471703

Big Bow is a census-designated place (CDP) in Stanton County, Kansas, United States. As of the 2020 census, the population was 32.

== History ==
The first post office in Big Bow was established February 17, 1925, and was discontinued June 2, 1981.

== Demographics ==
Historical population
Census	Pop.	Note	%±
2020	32		—
U.S. Decennial Census

The 2020 United States census counted 32 people, 13 households, and 13 families in Big Bow. The population density was 6.4 per square mile (2.5/km^{2}). There were 20 housing units at an average density of 4.0 per square mile (1.5/km^{2}). The racial makeup was 78.12% (25) white or European American (68.75% non-Hispanic white), 6.25% (2) black or African-American, 6.25% (2) Native American or Alaska Native, 0.0% (0) Asian, 0.0% (0) Pacific Islander or Native Hawaiian, 0.0% (0) from other races, and 9.38% (3) from two or more races. Hispanic or Latino of any race was 15.62% (5) of the population.

Of the 13 households, 61.5% had children under the age of 18; 53.8% were married couples living together; 38.5% had a female householder with no spouse or partner present. 0.0% of households consisted of individuals and 0.0% had someone living alone who was 65 years of age or older. The average household size was 2.8 and the average family size was 5.3.

43.8% of the population was under the age of 18, 0.0% from 18 to 24, 21.9% from 25 to 44, 25.0% from 45 to 64, and 9.4% who were 65 years of age or older. The median age was 33.0 years. For every 100 females, there were 77.8 males. For every 100 females ages 18 and older, there were 38.5 males.

== In culture ==
In 2022, Kansas State University released a hard white winter wheat variety named KS Big Bow in honor of the community and its relation to the wheat industry.
