= Stanton County, Kansas =

County in Kansas, United States

- County
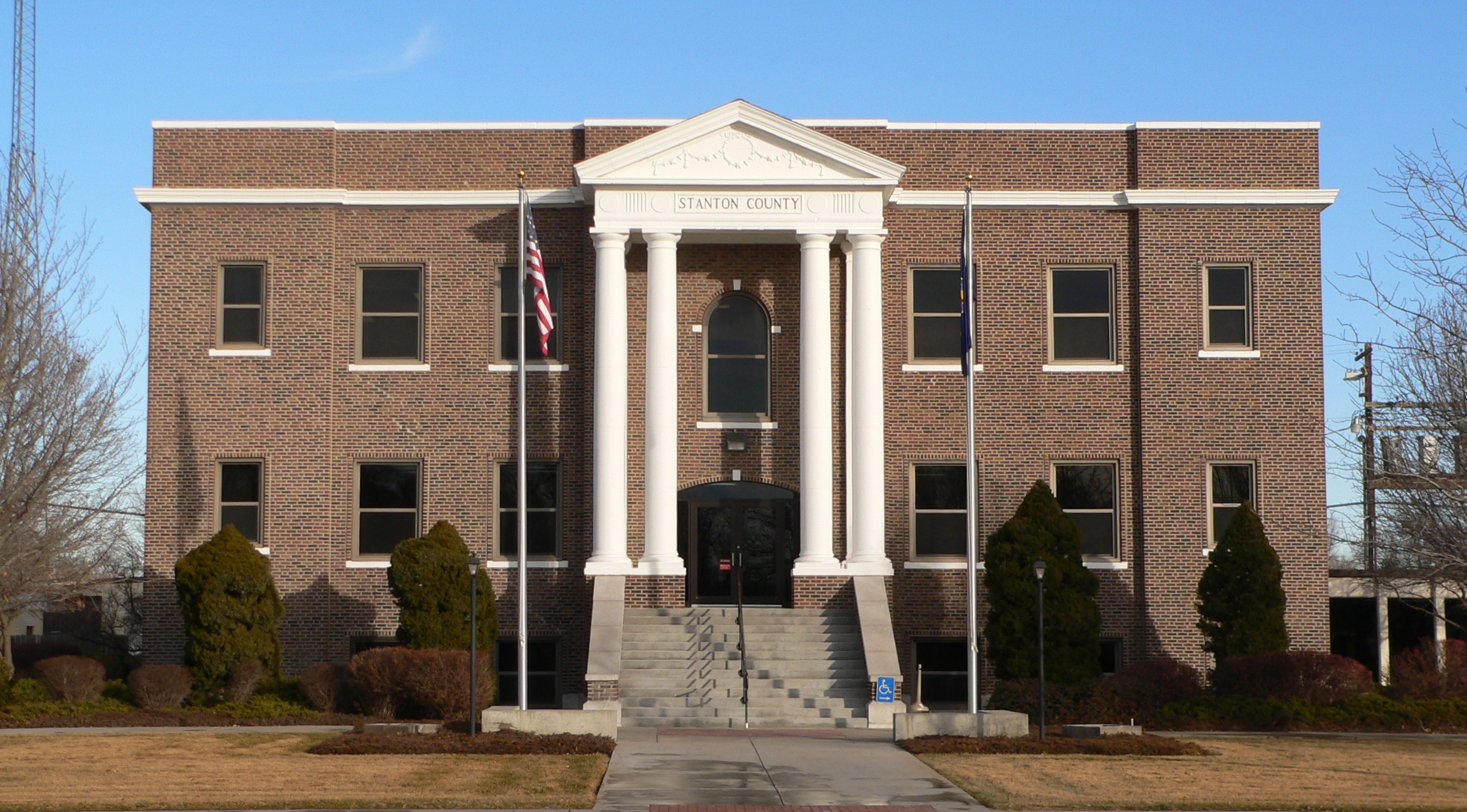
- Stanton County Courthouse in Johnson City (2010)

- Location within the U.S. state of Kansas
- Coordinates: 37°34′00″N 101°46′59″W
- Country: United States
- State: Kansas
- Founded: 1887
- Named for: Edwin Stanton
- Seat: Johnson City
- Largest city: Johnson City

Area
  - Total: 680 sq mi (1,800 km^{2})
  - Land: 680 sq mi (1,800 km^{2})
  - Water: 0.07 sq mi (0.18 km^{2}) 0.01%

Population (2020)
  - Total: 2,084
  - Estimate (2025): 1,986 ▼
  - Density: 3.1/sq mi (1.2/km^{2})
- Time zone: UTC−6 (Central)
  - Summer (DST): UTC−5 (CDT)
- Congressional district: 1st
- Website: stantoncountyks.com

Stanton County is a county located in the U.S. state of Kansas. Its county seat is Johnson City. As of the 2020 census, the county population was 2,084. It was named for Edwin Stanton, the U.S. Secretary of War during most of the Civil War.

== History ==
For many millennia, the Great Plains of North America was inhabited by nomadic Native Americans.

In 1854, the Kansas Territory was organized, then in 1861 Kansas became the 34th U.S. state.

In 1887, Stanton County was established, and named for Edwin Stanton.

In the 1930s, the prosperity of the area was severely affected by its location within the Dust Bowl. This catastrophe intensified the economic impact of the Great Depression in the region.

== Geography ==
According to the United States Census Bureau, the county has a total area of 680 square miles (1,800 km^{2}), of which 680 square miles (1,800 km^{2}) is land and 0.07 square miles (0.18 km^{2}) (0.01%) is water.

=== Major highways ===
- U.S. Highway 160
- Kansas Highway 27

=== Adjacent counties ===
- Hamilton County (north/Mountain Time border)
- Grant County (east)
- Stevens County (southeast)
- Morton County (south)
- Baca County, Colorado (west/Mountain Time border)
- Prowers County, Colorado (northwest/Mountain Time border)

== Demographics ==
Historical population
Census	Pop.	Note	%±
1880	5		—
1890	1,031		20,520.0%
1900	327		−68.3%
1910	1,034		216.2%
1920	908		−12.2%
1930	2,152		137.0%
1940	1,443		−32.9%
1950	2,263		56.8%
1960	2,108		−6.8%
1970	2,287		8.5%
1980	2,339		2.3%
1990	2,333		−0.3%
2000	2,406		3.1%
2010	2,235		−7.1%
2020	2,084		−6.8%
2025 (est.)	1,986	▼	−4.7%
U.S. Decennial Census; 1790-1960 1900-1990; 1990-2000 2010-2020

=== 2020 census ===
As of the 2020 census, the county had a population of 2,084. The median age was 35.4 years. 28.7% of residents were under the age of 18 and 16.0% of residents were 65 years of age or older. For every 100 females there were 105.5 males, and for every 100 females age 18 and over there were 104.4 males age 18 and over.

The racial makeup of the county was 60.3% White, 0.7% Black or African American, 2.1% American Indian and Alaska Native, 0.1% Asian, 0.0% Native Hawaiian and Pacific Islander, 21.1% from some other race, and 15.7% from two or more races. Hispanic or Latino residents of any race comprised 43.6% of the population.

0.0% of residents lived in urban areas, while 100.0% lived in rural areas.

There were 783 households in the county, of which 36.4% had children under the age of 18 living with them and 22.6% had a female householder with no spouse or partner present. About 26.3% of all households were made up of individuals and 12.2% had someone living alone who was 65 years of age or older.

There were 931 housing units, of which 15.9% were vacant. Among occupied housing units, 70.8% were owner-occupied and 29.2% were renter-occupied. The homeowner vacancy rate was 0.4% and the rental vacancy rate was 10.9%.

=== 2000 census ===
As of the census of 2000, there were 2,406 people, 858 households, and 638 families residing in the county. The population density was 4 people per square mile (1.5 people/km^{2}). There were 1,007 housing units at an average density of 2 per square mile (0.77/km^{2}). The racial makeup of the county was 84.41% White, 0.62% Black or African American, 1.21% Native American, 0.17% Asian, 12.51% from other races, and 1.08% from two or more races. 23.69% of the population were Hispanic or Latino of any race.

There were 858 households, out of which 40.20% had children under the age of 18 living with them, 63.50% were married couples living together, 6.80% had a female householder with no husband present, and 25.60% were non-families. 22.60% of all households were made up of individuals, and 9.00% had someone living alone who was 65 years of age or older. The average household size was 2.74 and the average family size was 3.21.

In the county, the population was spread out, with 30.80% under the age of 18, 8.40% from 18 to 24, 28.30% from 25 to 44, 19.50% from 45 to 64, and 13.00% who were 65 years of age or older. The median age was 34 years. For every 100 females there were 104.10 males. For every 100 females age 18 and over, there were 103.20 males.

The median income for a household in the county was $40,172, and the median income for a family was $46,300. Males had a median income of $30,236 versus $21,250 for females. The per capita income for the county was $18,043. About 10.70% of families and 14.90% of the population were below the poverty line, including 16.80% of those under age 18 and 12.90% of those age 65 or over.

== Government ==
Stanton County is almost always Republican, The last time a democratic candidate carried the county was in 1964 by Lyndon B. Johnson.

=== Presidential elections ===
Presidential election results

United States presidential election results for Stanton County, Kansas
Year	Republican		Democratic		Third party(ies)	
Year	No.	%	No.	%	No.	%
1888	298	52.84%	197	34.93%	69	12.23%
1892	146	52.71%	0	0.00%	131	47.29%
1896	55	49.11%	57	50.89%	0	0.00%
1900	50	57.47%	36	41.38%	1	1.15%
1904	63	64.95%	34	35.05%	0	0.00%
1908	180	60.81%	107	36.15%	9	3.04%
1912	42	15.91%	114	43.18%	108	40.91%
1916	180	44.55%	170	42.08%	54	13.37%
1920	269	73.10%	89	24.18%	10	2.72%
1924	379	62.44%	158	26.03%	70	11.53%
1928	497	74.85%	164	24.70%	3	0.45%
1932	412	40.23%	598	58.40%	14	1.37%
1936	311	40.39%	458	59.48%	1	0.13%
1940	378	54.62%	301	43.50%	13	1.88%
1944	398	61.71%	240	37.21%	7	1.09%
1948	407	56.53%	300	41.67%	13	1.81%
1952	664	74.61%	215	24.16%	11	1.24%
1956	549	70.20%	226	28.90%	7	0.90%
1960	627	65.72%	323	33.86%	4	0.42%
1964	459	47.32%	500	51.55%	11	1.13%
1968	541	59.52%	288	31.68%	80	8.80%
1972	754	71.54%	259	24.57%	41	3.89%
1976	510	49.04%	489	47.02%	41	3.94%
1980	672	67.74%	231	23.29%	89	8.97%
1984	783	76.61%	205	20.06%	34	3.33%
1988	592	62.32%	310	32.63%	48	5.05%
1992	556	55.71%	224	22.44%	218	21.84%
1996	628	71.20%	189	21.43%	65	7.37%
2000	785	76.29%	215	20.89%	29	2.82%
2004	796	82.40%	165	17.08%	5	0.52%
2008	628	75.94%	188	22.73%	11	1.33%
2012	605	79.71%	143	18.84%	11	1.45%
2016	492	77.24%	115	18.05%	30	4.71%
2020	614	79.12%	148	19.07%	14	1.80%
2024	537	80.87%	115	17.32%	12	1.81%

=== Laws ===
Although the Kansas Constitution was amended in 1986 to allow the sale of alcoholic liquor by the individual drink with the approval of voters, Stanton County remained a prohibition, or "dry", county, until the county voted to approve the amendment in 2022, with no restrictions of food sales.

== Education ==
=== Unified school districts ===
- Stanton County USD 452

== Communities ==
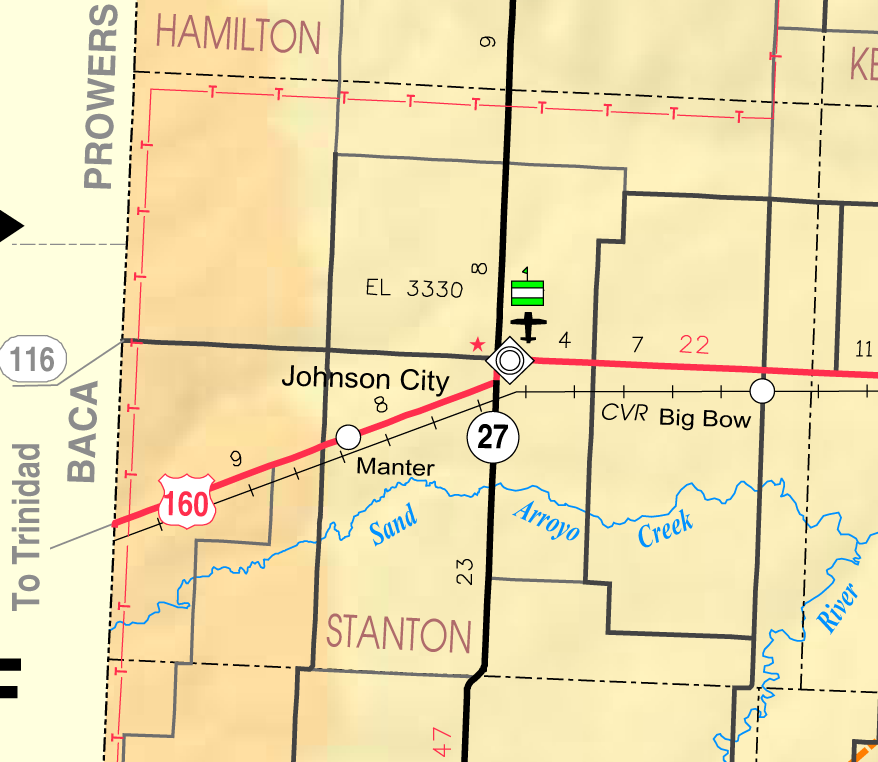
2005 map of Stanton County (map legend)

List of townships / incorporated cities / unincorporated communities / extinct former communities within Stanton County.
† means a community is designated a Census-Designated Place (CDP) by the United States Census Bureau.

=== Cities ===
- Johnson City (county seat)
- Manter

=== Unincorporated communities ===
- Big Bow†
- Julian
- Saunders

=== Townships ===
Area affected by 1930s Dust Bowl

Stanton County is divided into three townships. None of the cities within the county are considered governmentally independent, and all figures for the townships include those of the cities. In the following table, the population center is the largest city (or cities) included in that township's population total, if it is of a significant size.

Sources: 2000 U.S. Gazetteer from the U.S. Census Bureau.
Township	FIPS	Population center	Population	Population density /km^{2} (/sq mi)	Land area km^{2} (sq mi)	Water area km^{2} (sq mi)	Water %	Geographic coordinates
Big Bow	06600		338	1 (2)	558 (216)	0 (0)	0%	37°33′18″N 101°36′30″W
Manter	44400		312	0 (1)	647 (250)	0 (0)	0%	37°33′15″N 101°56′7″W
Stanton	67975	Johnson City	1,756	3 (8)	556 (215)	0 (0)	0.02%	37°33′42″N 101°45′31″W

== See also ==
Community information for Kansas

- Kansas locations by per capita income
- List of counties in Kansas
- List of townships in Kansas
- List of cities in Kansas
- List of unincorporated communities in Kansas
- List of ghost towns in Kansas
