= Menno (disambiguation) =

Menno is a given name.

It may also refer to:

== Places ==
- Menno Community Hall, Kendall, Kansas, USA

=== Places named after the Mennonites ===
- Menno Colony, Paraguay
- Menno Township, Pennsylvania, USA
- Menno Township, Marion County, Kansas, USA
- Menno, South Dakota, USA

== Other uses ==
- MennoMedia, Mennonite Church

== See also ==
- Menno Township (disambiguation)
- Mennonite
- Mennon
- Meno (disambiguation)
