= Menon of Pharsalus =

Menon of Pharsalus may refer to:

- Menon I of Pharsalus (525? BC–472? BC), assisted Cimon at Battle of Eion
- Menon II of Pharsalus (475? BC–431? BC), led troops assisting Athens in the Peloponnesian War
- Meno (general), also known as Menon III of Pharsalus (423? BC–400 BC), the character of Plato's Meno dialogue
- Menon IV of Pharsalus (375 BC–321 BC), 4th century Greek general

== See also ==
- Menon (disambiguation)
