= Menon =

Menon may refer to:

== People ==
- Menon (subcaste), an honorary title accorded to some Nairs.

=== Surnamed ===
- Menon (surname), a surname used historically by those with the title of Menon and now by their descendants.

=== Given named ===
- Menon (cookbook author), pseudonym of an unidentified 18th-century French cookbook author
- Menon (Phidias), a workman with Phidias
- Menon (Trojan), a Trojan soldier in Trojan War
- Menon I of Pharsalus, assisted Cimon at Battle of Eion
- Menon II of Pharsalus, led troops assisting Athens in the Peloponnesian War
- Menon III of Pharsalus or Meno, a Thessalian general and character in Plato's Meno dialogue. One of the generals of the Greek mercenaries in the army of Cyrus the Younger.
- Menon IV of Pharsalus (born ?), 4th century Greek general
- Menon, 4th century BC Peripatetic writer on medicine: see Anonymus Londinensis

== Other uses ==
- Menon (gastropod), a genus of gastropods within the family Eulimidae
- Meno, a dialogue by Plato, is sometimes referred to also as Menon
- Menon's caecilian
- Menon (weapon) An Italian anti-submarine mortar

== See also ==
- Mennon
- Manon (disambiguation)
- Menos (disambiguation)
- Meno (disambiguation)
- Memon (disambiguation)
