= Coolidge, Kansas =

City in Hamilton County, Kansas

- City
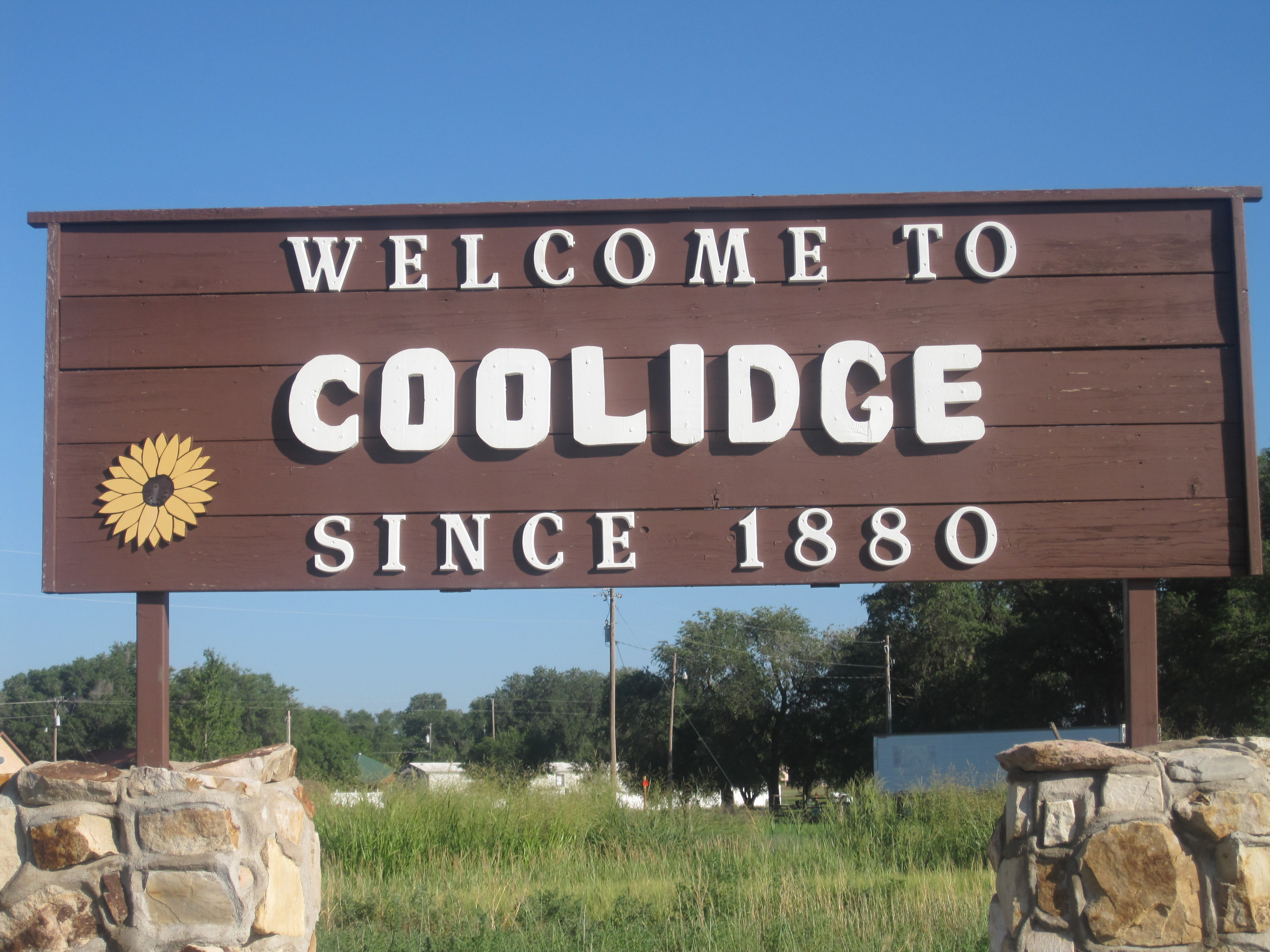
- Welcome Sign (2010)

- Location within Hamilton County and Kansas

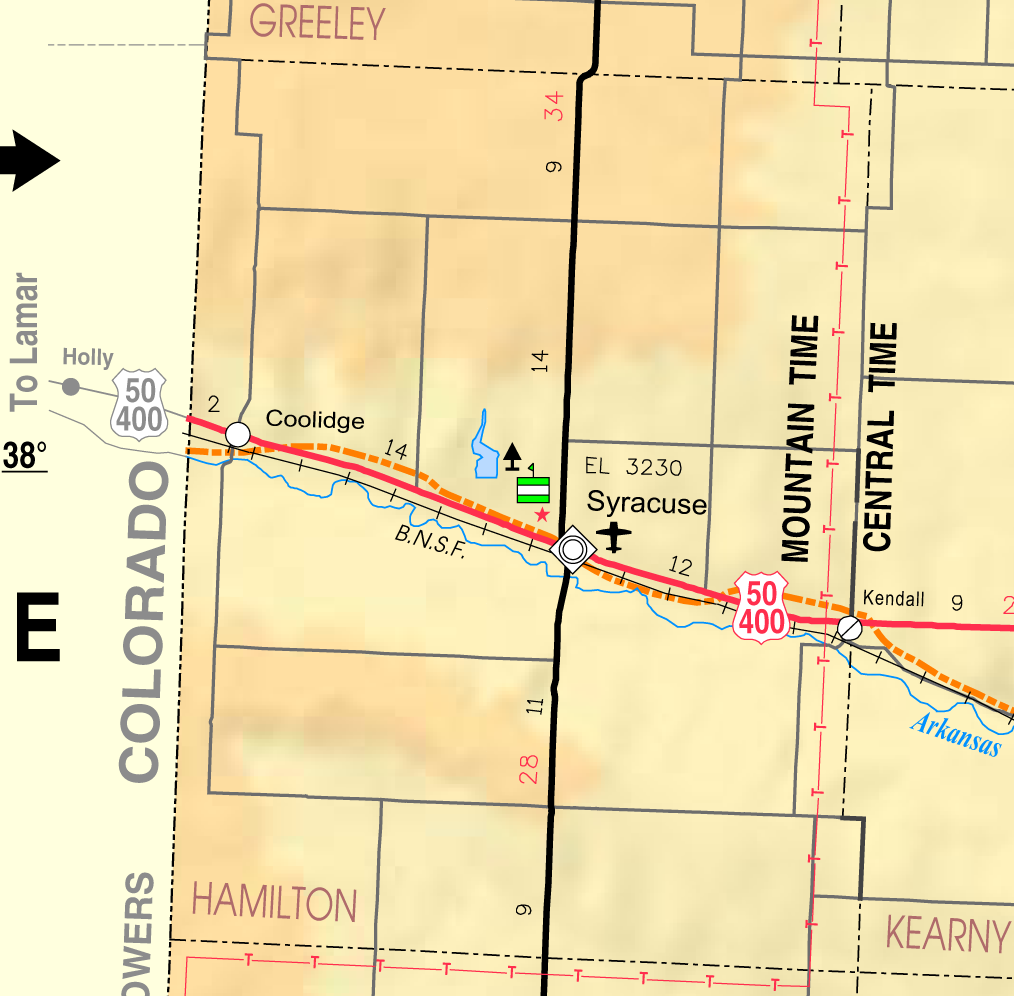
- KDOT map of Hamilton County (legend)
- Coordinates: 38°02′29″N 102°00′28″W
- Country: United States
- State: Kansas
- County: Hamilton
- Founded: 1880
- Incorporated: 1886
- Named for: Thomas Coolidge

Area
  - Total: 0.46 sq mi (1.20 km^{2})
  - Land: 0.46 sq mi (1.20 km^{2})
  - Water: 0 sq mi (0.00 km^{2})
- Elevation: 3,353 ft (1,022 m)

Population (2020)
  - Total: 80
  - Density: 170/sq mi (67/km^{2})
- Time zone: UTC-7 (Mountain (MST))
  - Summer (DST): UTC-6 (MDT)
- ZIP Code: 67836
- Area code: 620
- FIPS code: 20-15400
- GNIS ID: 2393627

Coolidge is a city in Hamilton County, Kansas, United States. As of the 2020 census, the population of the city was 80. It is located along Highway 50, approximately one mile east of the Colorado-Kansas border.

== History ==
The city of Coolidge was named after Thomas Jefferson Coolidge, the former president of the Atchison, Topeka and Santa Fe Railway.

The first post office in Coolidge was established in July 1881.

== Geography ==
According to the United States Census Bureau, the city has a total area of 0.46 square miles (1.19 km^{2}), all land.

=== Climate ===
According to the Köppen Climate Classification system, Coolidge has a semi-arid climate, abbreviated "BSk" on climate maps.

== Demographics ==
Historical population
| Census | Pop. | Note | %± |
|---|---|---|---|
| 1890 | 472 | | — |
| 1900 | 288 | | −39.0% |
| 1910 | 145 | | −49.7% |
| 1920 | 144 | | −0.7% |
| 1930 | 135 | | −6.2% |
| 1940 | 132 | | −2.2% |
| 1950 | 168 | | 27.3% |
| 1960 | 117 | | −30.4% |
| 1970 | 102 | | −12.8% |
| 1980 | 82 | | −19.6% |
| 1990 | 90 | | 9.8% |
| 2000 | 86 | | −4.4% |
| 2010 | 95 | | 10.5% |
| 2020 | 80 | | −15.8% |
U.S. Decennial Census

=== 2020 census ===
The 2020 United States census counted 80 people, 28 households, and 16 families in Coolidge. The population density was 173.2 per square mile (66.9/km^{2}). There were 44 housing units at an average density of 95.2 per square mile (36.8/km^{2}). The racial makeup was 65.0% (52) white or European American (63.75% non-Hispanic white), 2.5% (2) black or African-American, 3.75% (3) Native American or Alaska Native, 0.0% (0) Asian, 0.0% (0) Pacific Islander or Native Hawaiian, 20.0% (16) from other races, and 8.75% (7) from two or more races. Hispanic or Latino of any race was 27.5% (22) of the population.

Of the 28 households, 39.3% had children under the age of 18; 50.0% were married couples living together; 7.1% had a female householder with no spouse or partner present. 35.7% of households consisted of individuals and 17.9% had someone living alone who was 65 years of age or older. The average household size was 2.6 and the average family size was 5.0. The percent of those with a bachelor's degree or higher was estimated to be 10.0% of the population.

31.2% of the population was under the age of 18, 10.0% from 18 to 24, 17.5% from 25 to 44, 22.5% from 45 to 64, and 18.8% who were 65 years of age or older. The median age was 35.0 years. For every 100 females, there were 73.9 males. For every 100 females ages 18 and older, there were 77.4 males.

The 2016–2020 5-year American Community Survey estimates show that the median household income was $31,000 (with a margin of error of +/- $5,248) and the median family income was $37,188 (+/- $15,126). Males had a median income of $31,167 (+/- $1,709) versus $23,611 (+/- $507) for females. The median income for those above 16 years old was $30,333 (+/- $8,990). Approximately, 0.0% of families and 3.7% of the population were below the poverty line, including 0.0% of those under the age of 18 and 5.3% of those ages 65 or over.

=== 2010 census ===
As of the census of 2010, there were 95 people, 43 households, and 26 families residing in the city. The population density was 206.5 inhabitants per square mile (79.7/km^{2}). There were 49 housing units at an average density of 106.5 per square mile (41.1/km^{2}). The racial makeup of the city was 82.1% White and 17.9% from other races. Hispanic or Latino of any race were 33.7% of the population.

There were 43 households, of which 30.2% had children under the age of 18 living with them, 41.9% were married couples living together, 9.3% had a female householder with no husband present, 9.3% had a male householder with no wife present, and 39.5% were non-families. 32.6% of all households were made up of individuals, and 18.6% had someone living alone who was 65 years of age or older. The average household size was 2.21 and the average family size was 2.88.

The median age in the city was 42.1 years. 25.3% of residents were under the age of 18; 2% were between the ages of 18 and 24; 27.4% were from 25 to 44; 28.4% were from 45 to 64; and 16.8% were 65 years of age or older. The gender makeup of the city was 50.5% male and 49.5% female.

== Education ==
The community is served by Syracuse USD 494 public school district, located in the city of Syracuse.

== Cultural references ==
In the 1983 movie National Lampoon's Vacation starring Chevy Chase as Clark Griswold, the Griswolds visits Cousin Eddie and his family, who live on a farm outside Coolidge.

== Gallery ==
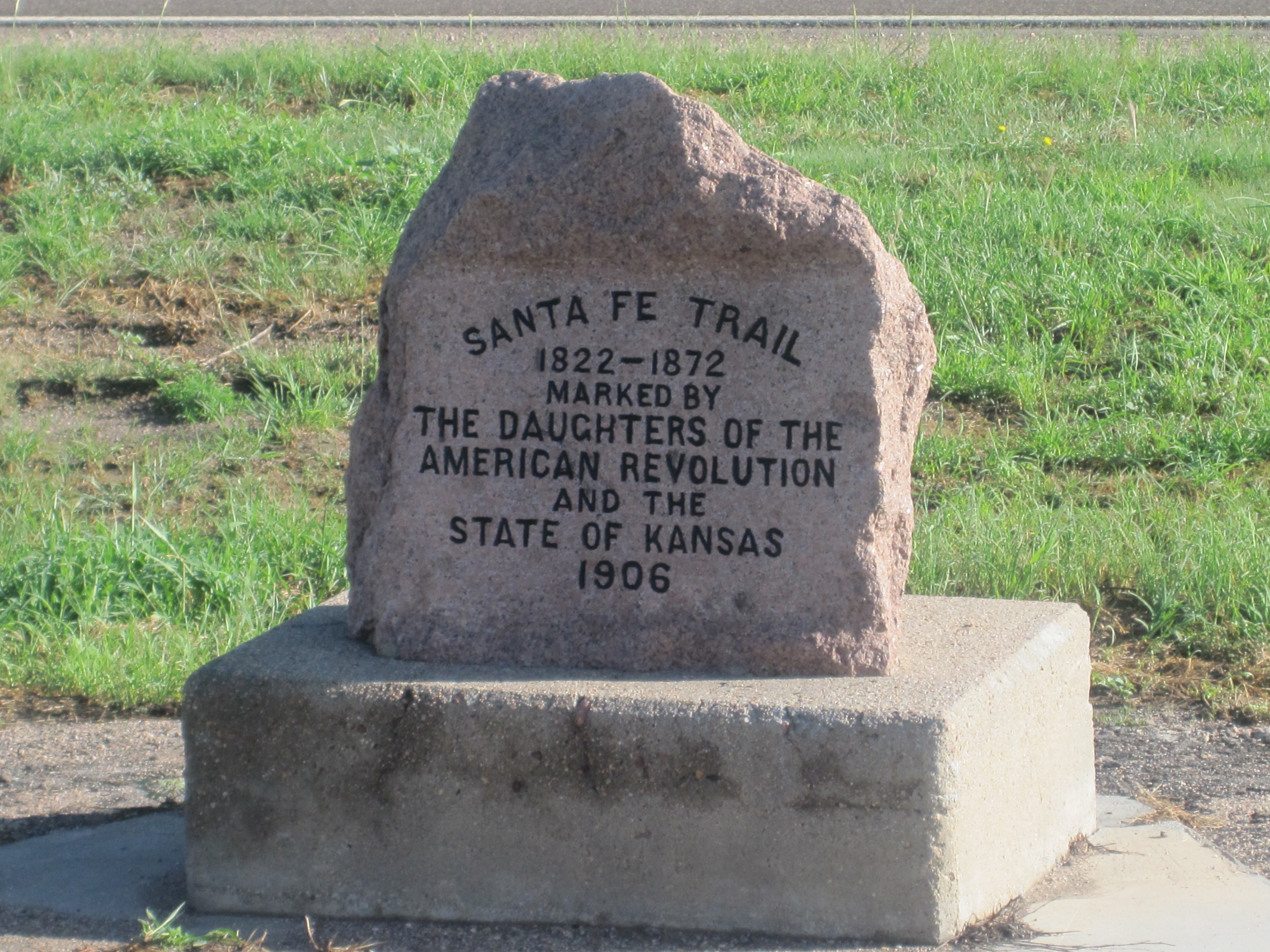
Santa Fe Trail marker in Coolidge.

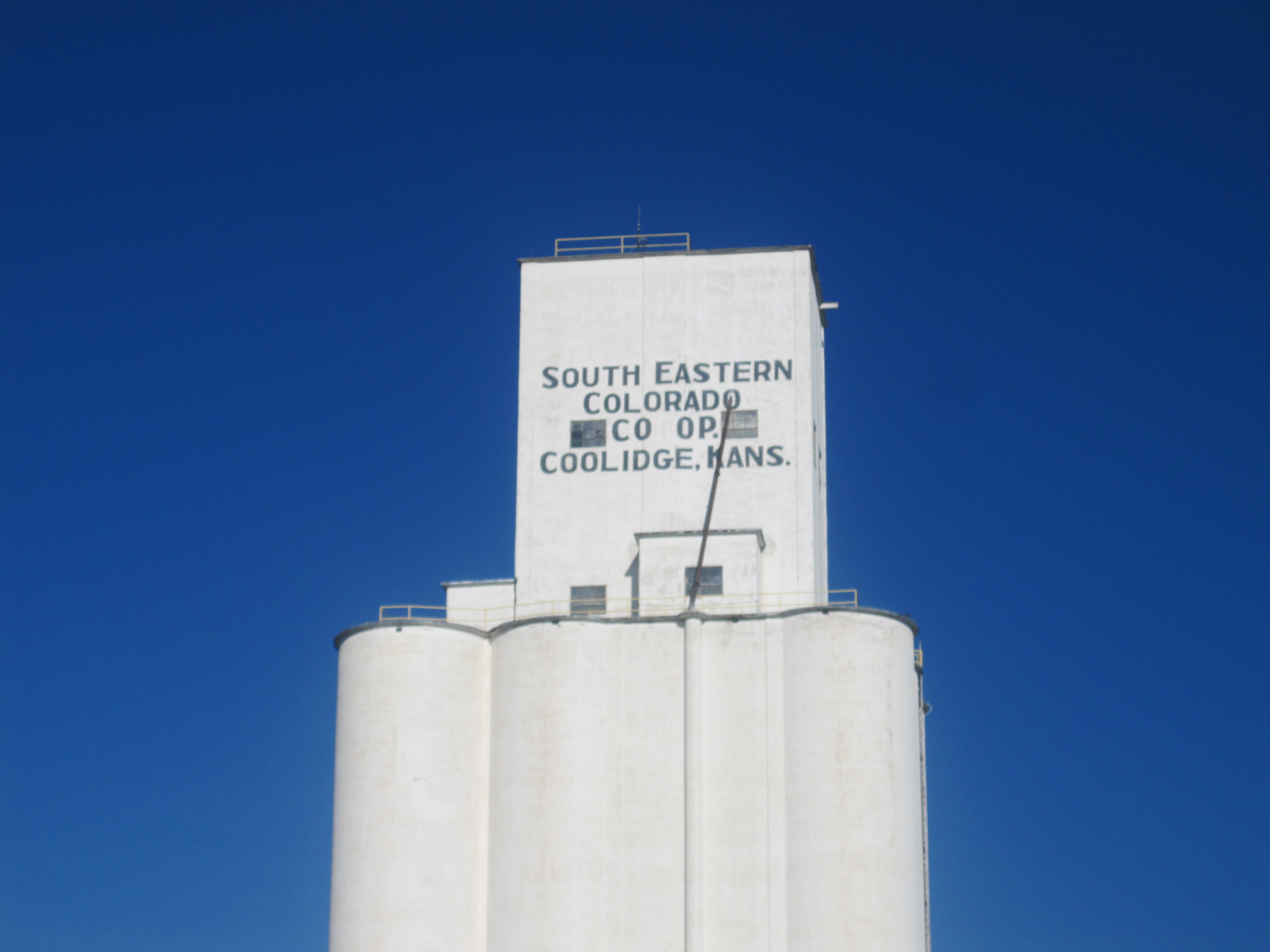
Grain elevator in Coolidge.

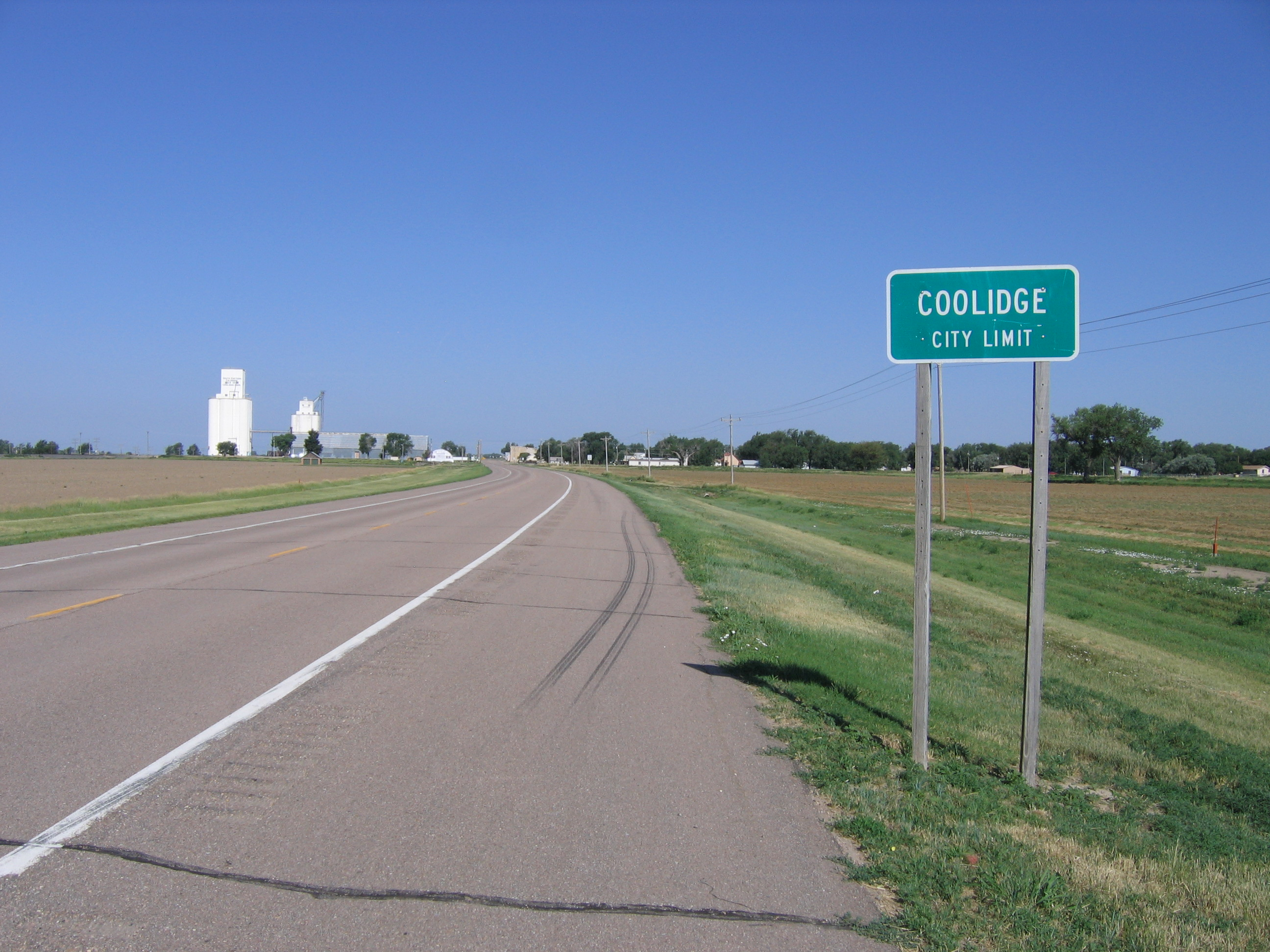
Looking westward on U.S. Highway 50/400.

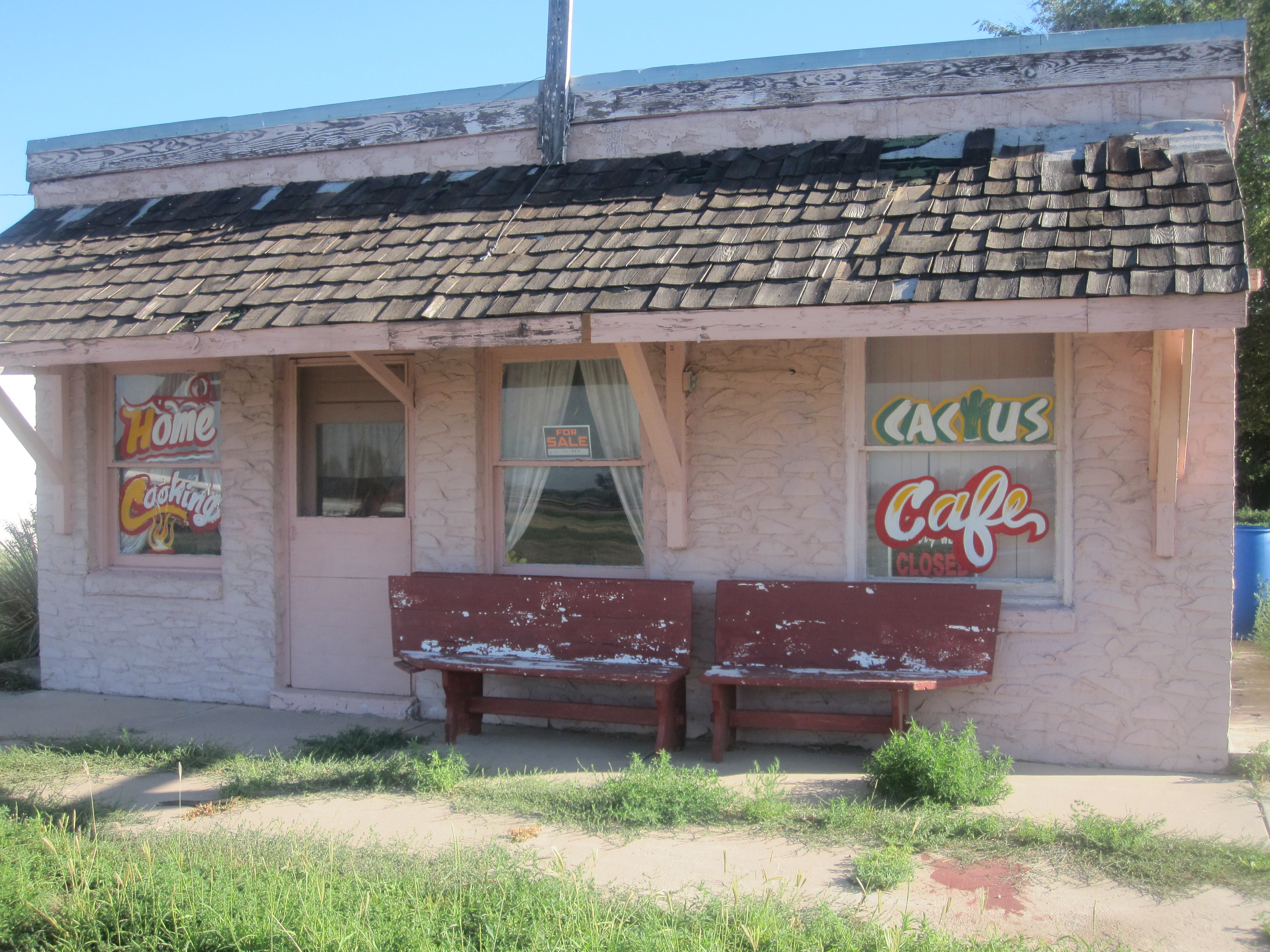
"Cactus Café" in Coolidge. It was reopened as "Western Trail Cafe and then reopened again as Gracie's Cafe".

== See also ==
- Santa Fe Trail
