= Sluiter =

Sluiter is a Dutch surname. Variants are Sluiters, Sluijter(s) and Sluyter(s). Literally meaning "one who closes", it is an occupational surname, originating from people with the profession of doorkeeper, gateman, warden, jailor, etc. Notable people with the surname include:

== Sluiter ==
- Carel Philip Sluiter (1854–1933), Dutch biologist and anatomist
- Ineke Sluiter (born 1959), Dutch classicist
- Raemon Sluiter (born 1978), Dutch tennis player
- Tim Sluiter (born 1989), Dutch golfer
- Willy Sluiter (1873–1949), Dutch painter

== Sluijter ==
- Ad Sluijter (born 1981), Dutch guitarist
- Jeroen Sluijter (born 1975), Dutch baseball player
- Menno Sluijter (born 1932), Dutch anaesthetist
- Pem Sluijter (1939–2007), Dutch poet
- Thijs Sluijter (born 1980), Dutch footballer

== Sluyter ==
- Andrew Sluyter (born 1958), American social scientist and geographer
- Dean Sluyter (born 1949), American author and meditation teacher
- John Sluyter Wirt (1851–1904), American politician and lawyer
- Monique Sluyter (born 1967), Dutch model and television presenter

== Sluijters/Sluyters ==
- Georges Joseph van Sluijters (1868–1943), French painter and designer
- Iso Sluijters (born 1990), Dutch handball player
- Jan Sluijters (1881–1957), Dutch painter
- Wilhelmina van Sluyters (1852–1926), Dutch actress
