= Menno =

Dutch masculine given name

- Pronunciation: Dutch: [ˈmɛnoː]
- Language: Dutch

Origin
- Language: Old Frisian

Other names
- Derived: Meine

Menno (Dutch pronunciation: [ˈmɛnoː]) is a Dutch masculine given name of Old Frisian origin. It was made popular by the influential Frisian religious reformer Menno Simons, and the name was spread by his followers, the Mennonites.

Menno is the Dutch version of Frisian Meine. Like other Germanic names with mein-, it stems from megin- "power, strength".

== People named Menno ==
People with the given name Menno include:

- Menno Aden (born 1942), German lawyer and politician
- Menno Bergsen (born 1999), Dutch footballer
- Menno Boelsma (born 1961), Dutch speed skater
- Menno ter Braak (1902–1940), Dutch writer
- Menno van Coehoorn (1641–1704), Dutch soldier and engineer
- Menno van Gorp (born 1989), Dutch breakdancer
- Menno Heerkes (born 1993), Dutch footballer
- Menno Heus (born 1995), Dutch footballer
- Menno T. Kamminga (born 1949), Dutch law professor
- Menno Koch (born 1994), Dutch footballer
- Menno-Jan Kraak (born 1958), Dutch cartographer
- Menno van Meeteren Brouwer (1882–1974), Dutch painter
- Menno Meyjes (born 1954), Dutch-born screenwriter, director and producer
- Menno Oosting (1964–1999) Dutch tennis player
- Menno Schilthuizen (born 1965), Dutch biologist and ecologist
- Menno Simons (1496–1561), founder of the Mennonites
- Menno Sluijter (1932–2022), Dutch anaesthetist
- Menno Snel (born 1970), Dutch politician
- Menno Veldhuis (born 1974), Dutch painter and photographer
- Menno Versteeg, Canadian musician
- Menno Westendorp (born 1969), Dutch cinematographer
- Menno Willems (born 1977), Dutch footballer
