= Menno Township =

Menno Township may refer to the following townships in the United States:

- Menno Township, Pennsylvania
- Menno Township, Marion County, Kansas

== See also ==
- Menno (disambiguation)
