= Meno (disambiguation) =

Meno is a Socratic dialogue written by Plato.

Meno may also refer to:

== Places ==
- Meno, Oklahoma, United States

== People ==
- Meno, a transliteration of the Ancient Greek name Menon
- Jenni Meno (born 1970), American figure skater
- Joe Meno (born 1974), American fiction writer
- Meno Burg (1789-1853), Jewish Prussian military officer

== Other uses ==
- Meno (general), the Thessalian general and title character in Plato's Meno
- Meno's slave, a character in Plato's Meno
- meno, a musical term meaning less, as in meno mosso (less quickly); see Tempo § Common qualifiers

== See also ==
- Menno (disambiguation)
- Menon (disambiguation)
- Menos (disambiguation)
