= Menno Community Hall =

- U.S. National Register of Historic Places
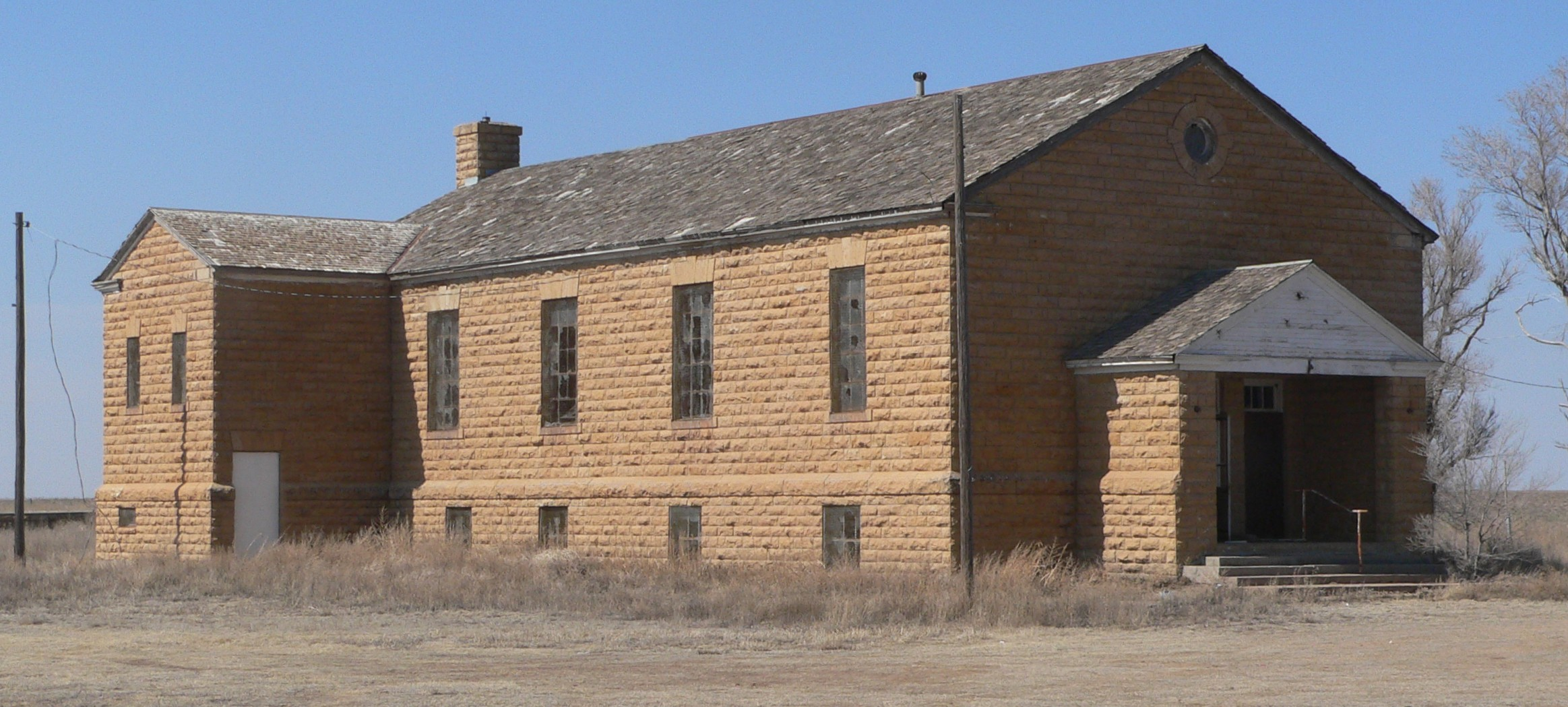

- Location within Kansas Location within the United States
- Location: NE4, NE4, NE4, NE4, S. 15, T. 26S, R. 49W, near Kendall, Hamilton County, Kansas
- Coordinates: 37°47′40″N 101°33′50″W
- Area: less than one acre
- Built: 1936-1937
- Architect: Blanchard, Howard T.
- Architectural style: WPA Rustic
- MPS: New Deal-Era Resources of Kansas MPS
- NRHP reference No.: 02001700
- Added to NRHP: March 25, 2003

Menno Community Hall, near Kendall, Kansas, was built during 1936–1937 as a Works Progress Administration project. It was listed on the National Register of Historic Places in 2003. It was designed by Howard T. Blanchard of Garden City, Kansas, in WPA Rustic architecture.

It was built of local brown limestone walls upon a concrete foundation.
