= Kendall, Kansas =

Unincorporated community in Hamilton County, Kansas

- Unincorporated community
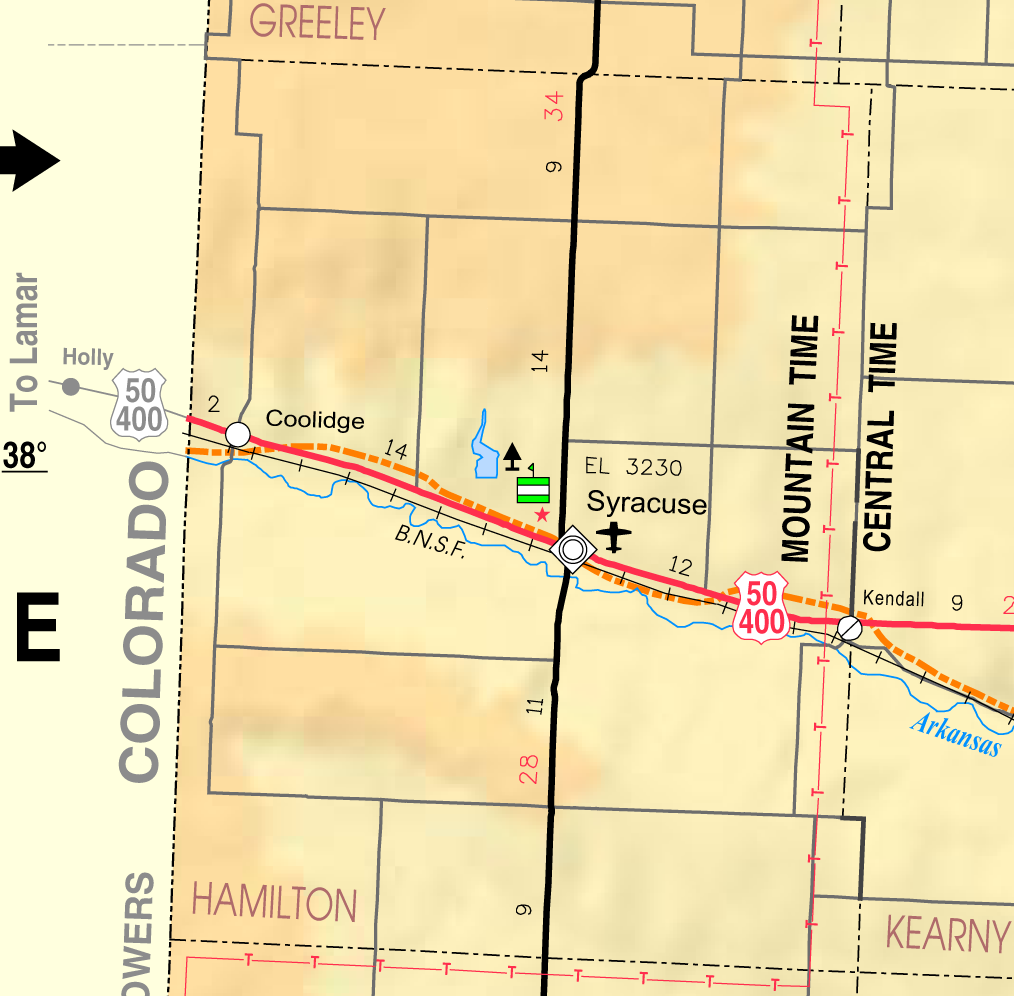
- KDOT map of Hamilton County (legend)

- Location within Kansas Location within the United States
- Coordinates: 37°56′05″N 101°32′46″W
- Country: United States
- State: Kansas
- County: Hamilton
- Elevation: 3,140 ft (960 m)
- Time zone: UTC-7 (Mountain (MST))
  - Summer (DST): UTC-6 (MDT)
- ZIP Code: 67857
- Area code: 620
- FIPS code: 20-36400
- GNIS ID: 471586

Kendall is an unincorporated community in Hamilton County, Kansas, United States. It is located near U.S. Route 50, approximately 12 miles (19 km) southeast of Syracuse.

== History ==
The frontiersman Charles "Buffalo" Jones, who in 1879 had co-founded Garden City, left from Kendall in 1886 on a hunt to try to capture remaining buffalo to prevent their looming extinction.

== Education ==
The community is served by Syracuse USD 494 public school district, located in the city of Syracuse.

Kendall schools were closed through school unification. The Kendall High School mascot was Kendall Bobcats.

== See also ==
- Santa Fe Trail
