= Menos =

Menos may refer to:

== People ==
- Gus Menos (1920–1990), American politician
- Hilary Menos (born 1964), English poet
- Solon Ménos (1859–1918), Haitian author and politician

=== Fictional characters ===
- Menos, a character in Teen Titans Go; see Más y Menos
- Menos, creatures in the Bleach universe

== Other uses ==
- Multimedia Exchange Network over Satellite

== See also ==
- Menon (disambiguation)
- Meno (disambiguation)
