= Syracuse USD 494 =

Public school district in Syracuse, Kansas

Address
- 408 N. Main Street Syracuse, Kansas, 67878; United States
- Coordinates: 37.9842°N 101.7518°W

District information
- Type: Public
- Grades: K to 12
- Schools: 2

Other information
- Website: usd494.org

Syracuse USD 494 is a public unified school district headquartered in Syracuse, Kansas, United States. The district includes the communities of Syracuse, Coolidge, Kendall, and rural areas of Hamilton County.

== Schools ==
The school district operates the following schools:

- Syracuse Jr/Sr High School
- Syracuse Elementary School

== See also ==
- List of high schools in Kansas
- List of unified school districts in Kansas
