= Menno Veldhuis =

Dutch artist

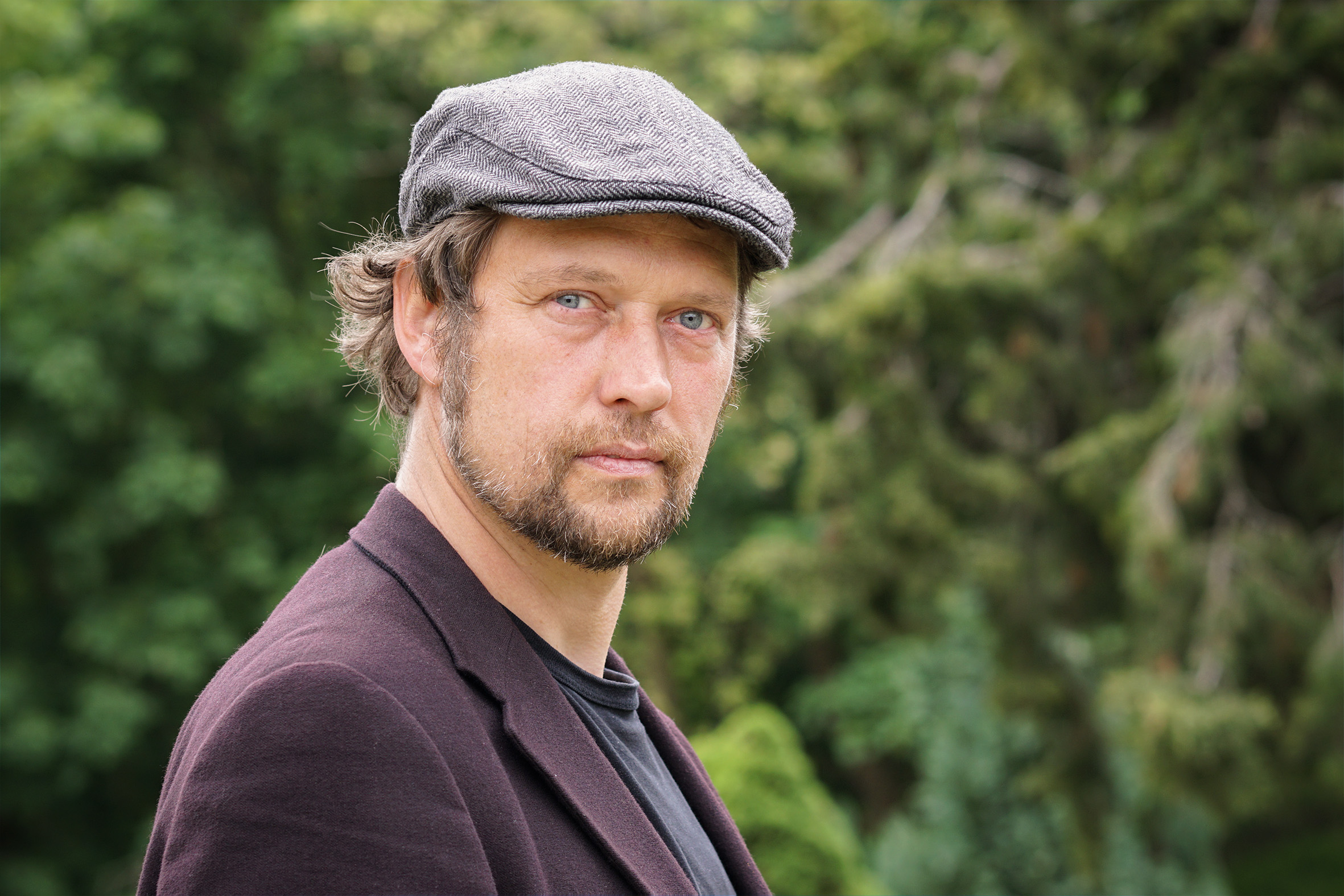
Menno Veldhuis, 2019

Menno Veldhuis (born 20 November 1974) is a Dutch artist.

== Biography ==
Veldhuis was born in Groenlo and grew up in Eibergen. From 1994 until 1999 he studied painting with Marie van Leeuwen, Paul van Dijk and Eli Content at the College of Arts Constantijn Huygens in Kampen (now ArtEZ Institute of the Arts in Zwolle). From 2000 until 2001 he studied history of art at the Utrecht University. From 1999 to 2003 he lives and works alternately in Arnhem, Velp and Bussum. From 2004 he lives and works in Potsdam, Germany]. 2008–2012 membership of Verein Berliner Künstler.

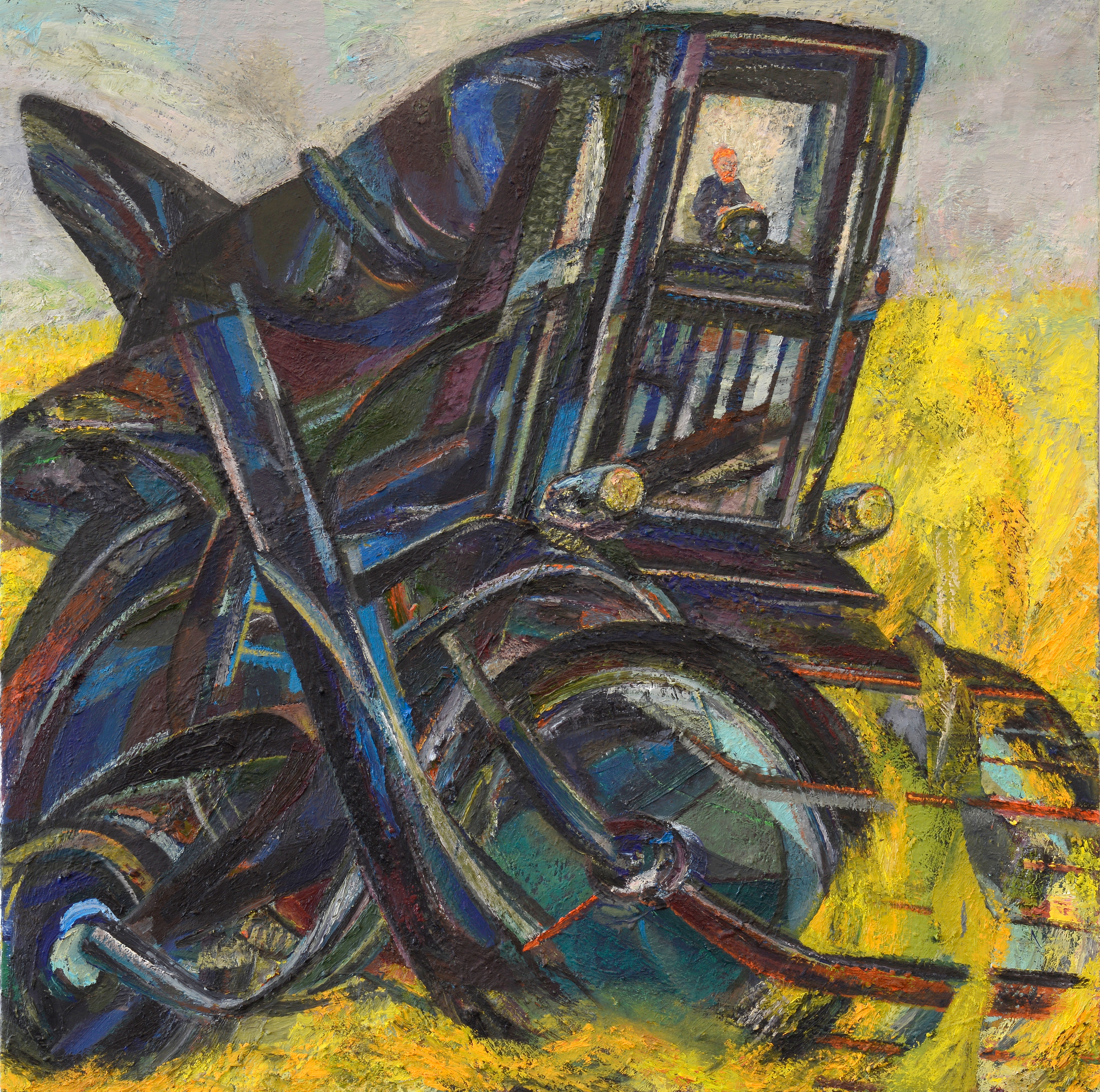
Harvest 1 (2013) by Menno Veldhuis

After an abstract series of 15 large oil paintings, titled "Machines" (2011– 2013), the artist finds in his next work "Ernte 1" ("Harvest 1", 2013) a more formal content and produces a series of Van Gogh-paintings.

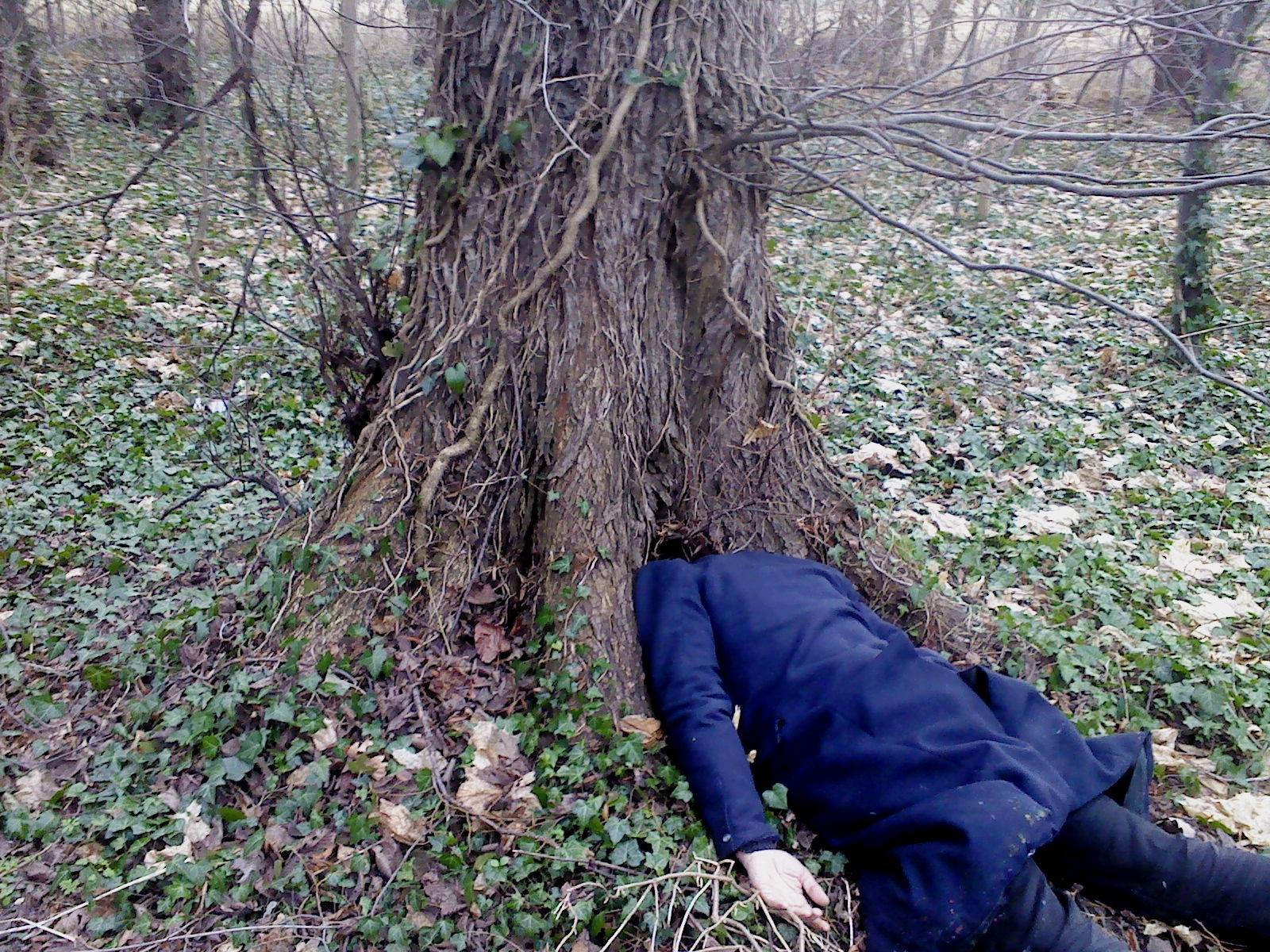
Back to Nature No. 143 (2013) by Menno Veldhuis

In 2013 Menno Veldhuis turns also to photography and creates a series of around 150 selfies „Back to Nature“, in which he shows his tendency to self-mockery.

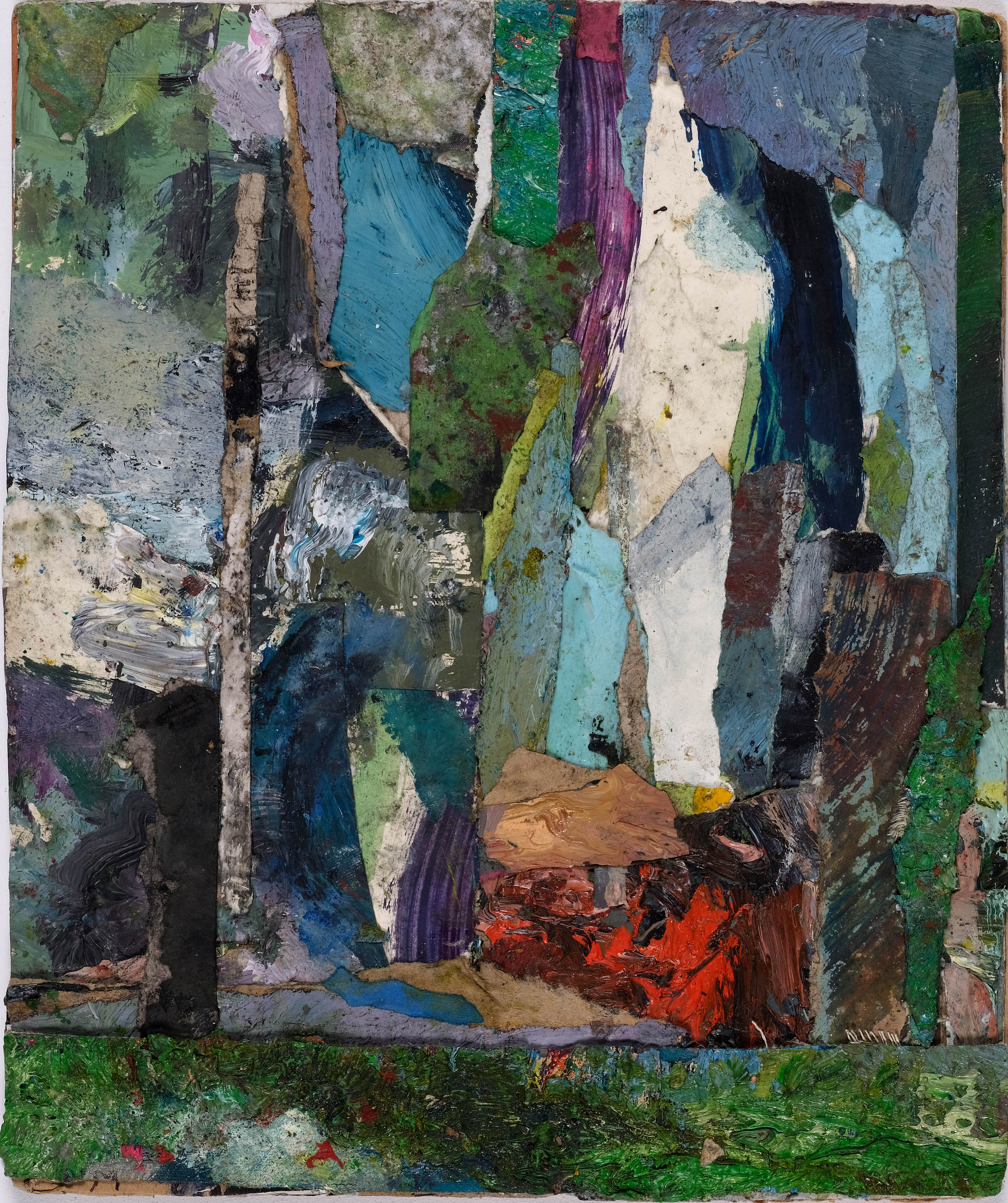
Woods No. 4 (2014) by Menno Veldhuis

In 2014 the artist create a series of collages „Woods“, using remains of paper, which he originally used as paint palette for his canvases.

Since 2020 Menno Veldhuis has been working with a technique of assemblage, giving his new works the appearance of miniature paintings within paintings, or resembling aerial photographs. In 2024 his art transformed into a series of the more abstract, large format assemblages.

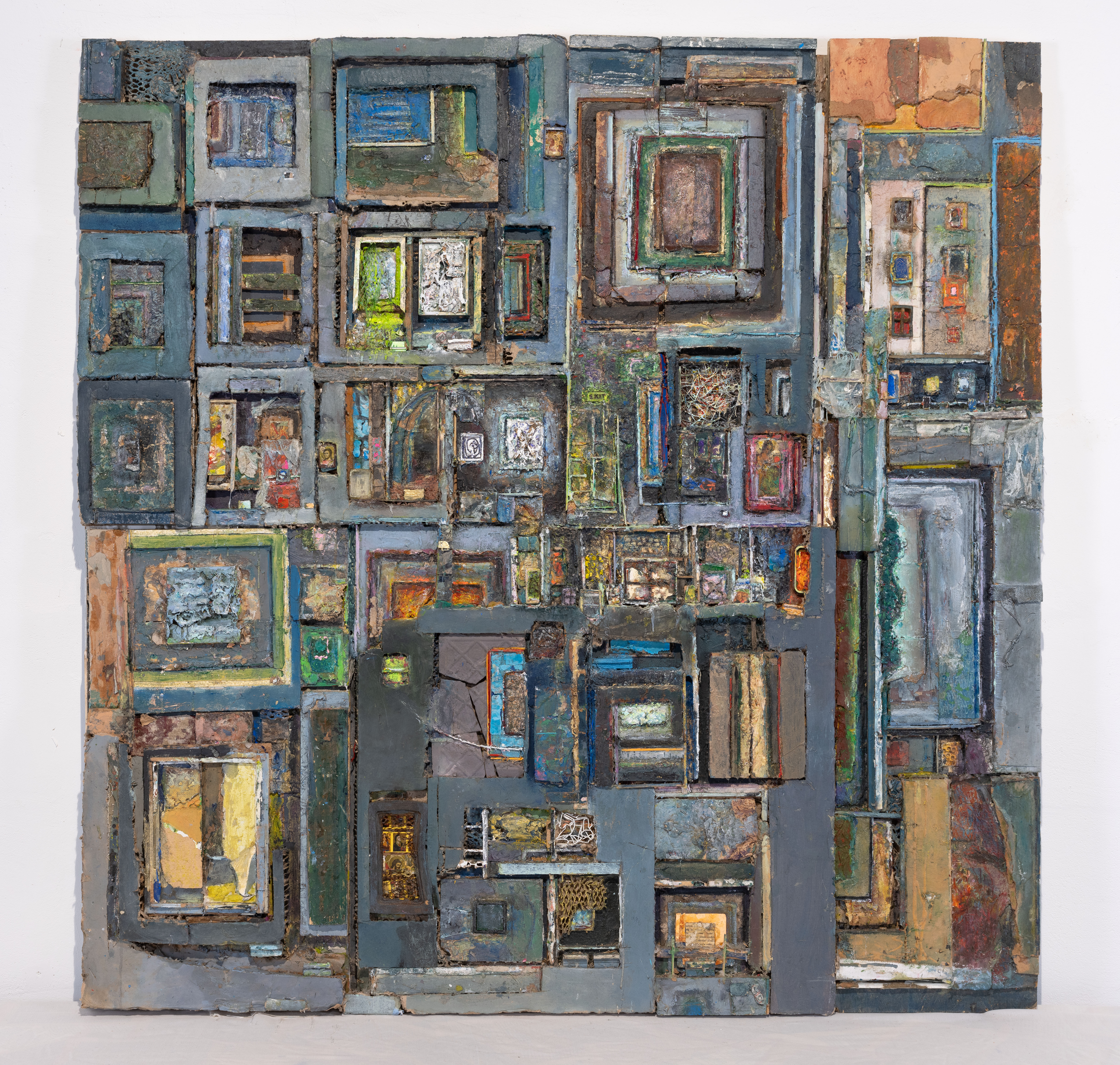
Night at the Museum (2024) by Menno Veldhuis

== Exhibitions (selection) ==
- 1999 In gebruik, Het Langhuis, Zwolle
- 2007 art fair Art Brandenburg, Potsdam
- 2009 Kiron Espace, Paris
- 2013 Made in Potsdam, Kunstraum Potsdam
- 2014 Menno Veldhuis, painting, drawing, photography, a|e GALERIE, Potsdam
- 2019 The post mortem felted club (with Simone Westphal), alte Dorfkirche Golm
- 2024 Baustellungen, URANIA Potsdam
- 2025 Depot, Jan Bouman Haus, Potsdam
