= Menon I of Pharsalus =

Assisted Cimon at Battle of Eion in c. 476 BC

Menon (Ancient Greek: Μένων, 525? BC – 472? BC) was a prominent Pharsalian who assisted Athens, led by Cimon, in their battle against Eion around 476 BC. According to Demosthenes (XIII.23, XXIII.199) he himself contributed 12 talents of silver and equipped 300 cavalry from his own penestae for battle. He was awarded by the Athenians for his service. He may be the father or grandfather of Menon II of Pharsalus.

== Bibliography ==
- Demosthenes: "On Organization" (line 23) & "Against Aristocrates" (line 199)
- Roland Grubb Kent, A History of Thessaly: From the Earliest Historical Times to the Ascension of Philip V. of Macedon, 1904, ch V, pp 20–21
- A Dictionary of Greek and Roman Biography and Mythology, Ed. William Smith, 1876, Vol 2 pp 1043–1044
