= Menno Township, Kansas =

Menno Township Marion County, Kansas
- Township
- Location within Marion County

- Location within the state of Kansas
- Coordinates: 38.3043777°N 97.3164428°W
- Country: United States
- State: Kansas
- County: Marion

Area
  - Total: 36 sq mi (93 km^{2})

Dimensions
  - Length: 6.0 mi (9.7 km)
  - Width: 6.0 mi (9.7 km)
- Elevation: 1,480 ft (450 m)

Population (2020)
  - Total: 304
  - Density: 8.4/sq mi (3.3/km^{2})
- Time zone: UTC-6 (CST)
  - Summer (DST): UTC-5 (CDT)
- Area code: 620
- FIPS code: 20-45800
- GNIS ID: 477340
- Website: County website

Menno Township is a township in Marion County, Kansas, United States. As of the 2020 census, the township population was 304.

== Geography ==
Menno Township covers an area of 36 square miles (93.2 km^{2}).

== Cities and towns ==
The township contains the following settlements:

- No cities or unincorporated communities.

== Cemeteries ==
The township contains the following cemeteries:

- Alexanderwohl Mennonite Church Cemetery, located in Section 33 T20S R1E.
- Gnadenfeld Community Cemetery (Schroeder Cemetery), located in Section 16 T20S R1E.
- Lutheran Church Cemetery (Early), located in Section 11 T20S R1E.
- Richert Cemetery, located in Section 22 T20S R1E.
- Springfeld / Springfield K.M.B. Cemetery, located in Section 8 T20S R1E.
- Steinbach Community Cemetery, located in Section 14 T20S R1E.
- Wedel Cemetery (a.k.a. Blumenfeld Cemetery), located in Section 31 T20S R1E.
- Wiebe Cemetery P.A. (a.k.a. North Springfield Cemetery), located in Section 7 T20S R1E.
- Schroeder / Hochfeld Cemetery, located in Section 20 T20S R1E.
- Blumfeld Cemetery (a.k.a. Wedel Cemetery), located in Section 31 T20S R1E.
- Duerksen Cemetery, located in Section 14 T20S R1E.
- John Banman Cemetery, located in Section 19 T20S R1E.
- Heinrich Franzen Cemetery, located in Section 17 T20S R1E.
- Andrew Schmidt Cemetery, located in Section 19 T20S R1E.
- Peter Schmidt Cemetery, located in Section 29 T20S R1E.
- Peter Unrau Cemetery, located in Section 29 T20S R1E.

== Transportation ==
K-15 highway passes north to south through the township.
