= Mennon =

Coordinates: 52°26′00″N 106°46′02″W

Mennon, Saskatchewan, is a community in mid-southern Saskatchewan, Canada. It is approximately 42 km (26 mi) away from Saskatoon, Saskatchewan. At one time the community was much larger than Saskatoon, however, it dropped in population when the railroad pulled out to go to other settlements.

Mennon now consists of four houses and a small, one-room schoolhouse. The schoolhouse is allegedly haunted by former members of Mennon. Over the years, residents have reported strange sightings there.

The post office opened on September 1, 1915 and closed on March 31, 1969.
