= Syracuse, Kansas =

City in Hamilton County, Kansas

- City and County seat
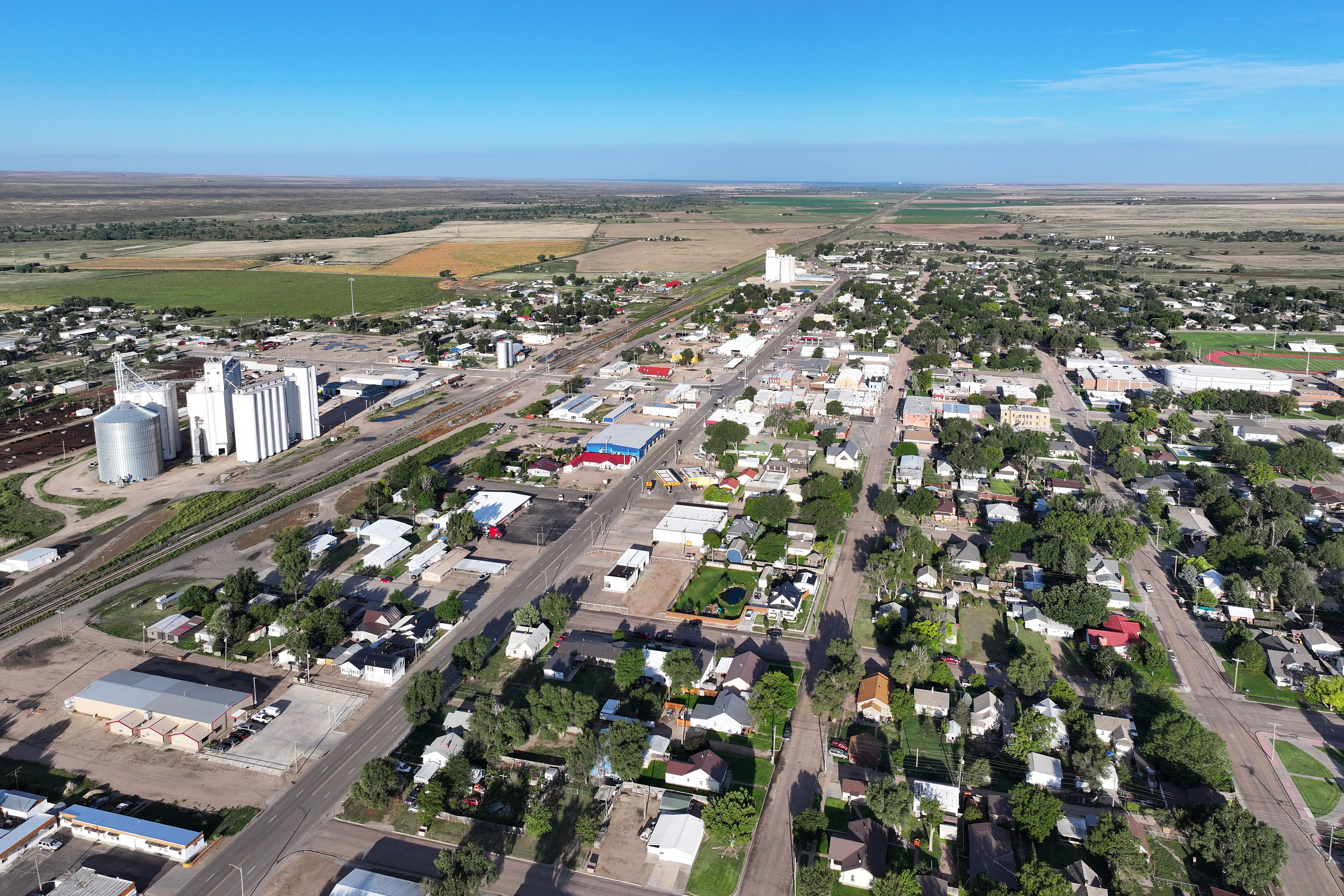
- Downtown Syracuse (2025)

- Location within Hamilton County and Kansas

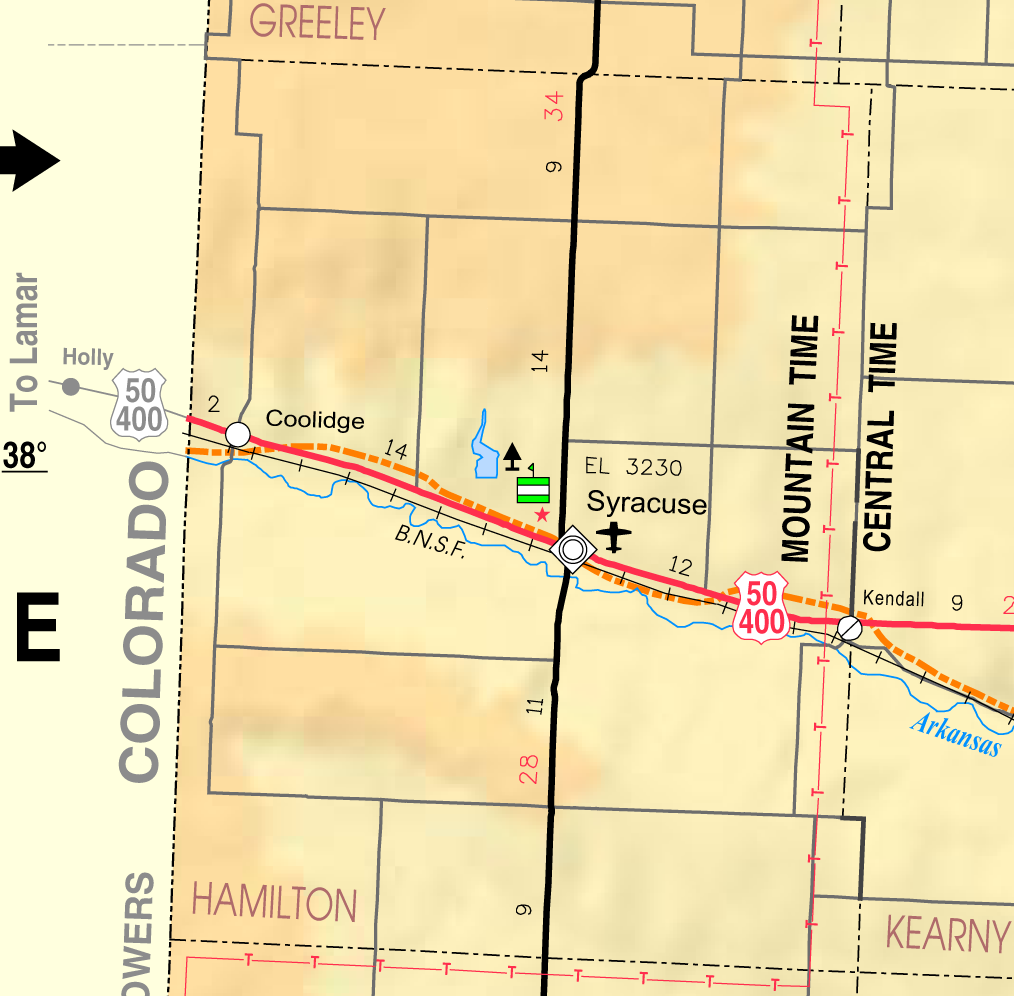
- KDOT map of Hamilton County (legend)
- Coordinates: 37°58′48″N 101°44′45″W
- Country: United States
- State: Kansas
- County: Hamilton
- Founded: 1873
- Incorporated: 1887
- Named for: Syracuse, New York

Area
  - Total: 4.10 sq mi (10.62 km^{2})
  - Land: 4.10 sq mi (10.62 km^{2})
  - Water: 0 sq mi (0.00 km^{2})
- Elevation: 3,265 ft (995 m)

Population (2020)
  - Total: 1,826
  - Density: 445.3/sq mi (171.9/km^{2})
- Time zone: UTC-7 (Mountain (MST))
  - Summer (DST): UTC-6 (MDT)
- ZIP Code: 67878
- Area code: 620
- FIPS code: 20-69850
- GNIS ID: 2396023
- Website: syracuseks.gov

Syracuse is a city in and the county seat of Hamilton County, Kansas, United States. As of the 2020 census, the population of the city was 1,826. It is located along Highway 50.

== History ==
Syracuse began its existence as a stop on the Atchison, Topeka and Santa Fe Railway. The site was originally called Holidayburg or Holliday in honor of Cyrus K. Holliday, first President of the ATSF railway. In 1873 a group of settlers from Syracuse, New York arrived and the site was renamed to Syracuse. In 1886, Syracuse was recognized as the county seat of Hamilton County. Syracuse secured its place in American history on April 5, 1887 by electing an all-woman city council, the first in the nation. The council consisted of Mrs. N. E. Wheeler (mayor), Caroline Johnson Barber, Mrs. W. A. Swartwood, Mrs. S. P. Nott, Mrs. Charles Coe, and Mrs. G. C. Riggles.

By 1912, Syracuse was home to more than a thousand souls, two banks, a hotel belonging to the Fred Harvey Company, a flour mill, several machine shops, two weekly newspapers (Syracuse Journal and the Republican-News), four churches, a county high school with 10 teachers, a telegraph and express office, and an international money order post office.

== Geography ==
Syracuse is located along U.S. Route 50 and the Atchison, Topeka and Santa Fe Railway, 16 miles (26 km) from the Colorado border. The Arkansas River runs just south of the city of Syracuse. The countryside south of the Arkansas River is marked by sandhills. Located within these sandhills is the "Syracuse Sand Dunes," a city park covering 1,300 acres (5.3 km^{2}), including a 40-acre (160,000 m^{2}) fishing pond.

According to the United States Census Bureau, the city has a total area of 4.10 square miles (10.62 km^{2}), all land.

=== Climate ===
According to the Köppen Climate Classification system, Syracuse has a semi-arid climate, abbreviated "BSk" on climate maps.

Climate data for Syracuse, Kansas, 1991–2020 normals, extremes 1893–present
Month	Jan	Feb	Mar	Apr	May	Jun	Jul	Aug	Sep	Oct	Nov	Dec	Year
Record high °F (°C)	82 (28)	89 (32)	94 (34)	100 (38)	104 (40)	111 (44)	114 (46)	110 (43)	106 (41)	99 (37)	92 (33)	82 (28)	114 (46)
Mean maximum °F (°C)	68.6 (20.3)	75.6 (24.2)	84.1 (28.9)	89.3 (31.8)	95.6 (35.3)	101.9 (38.8)	104.4 (40.2)	101.4 (38.6)	98.4 (36.9)	92.4 (33.6)	79.9 (26.6)	69.0 (20.6)	105.3 (40.7)
Mean daily maximum °F (°C)	46.4 (8.0)	50.6 (10.3)	60.4 (15.8)	68.7 (20.4)	77.9 (25.5)	88.6 (31.4)	92.9 (33.8)	90.2 (32.3)	83.6 (28.7)	71.2 (21.8)	57.4 (14.1)	47.1 (8.4)	69.6 (20.9)
Daily mean °F (°C)	30.0 (−1.1)	33.8 (1.0)	43.2 (6.2)	51.9 (11.1)	62.2 (16.8)	72.9 (22.7)	77.9 (25.5)	75.6 (24.2)	67.5 (19.7)	53.8 (12.1)	40.7 (4.8)	30.8 (−0.7)	53.4 (11.9)
Mean daily minimum °F (°C)	13.5 (−10.3)	17.0 (−8.3)	26.1 (−3.3)	35.2 (1.8)	46.5 (8.1)	57.2 (14.0)	63.0 (17.2)	60.9 (16.1)	51.4 (10.8)	36.5 (2.5)	24.0 (−4.4)	14.5 (−9.7)	37.2 (2.9)
Mean minimum °F (°C)	−0.4 (−18.0)	3.1 (−16.1)	10.1 (−12.2)	21.2 (−6.0)	32.8 (0.4)	45.2 (7.3)	53.8 (12.1)	52.8 (11.6)	37.9 (3.3)	21.8 (−5.7)	8.4 (−13.1)	−1.0 (−18.3)	−6.4 (−21.3)
Record low °F (°C)	−27 (−33)	−25 (−32)	−24 (−31)	8 (−13)	21 (−6)	35 (2)	44 (7)	40 (4)	21 (−6)	4 (−16)	−8 (−22)	−21 (−29)	−27 (−33)
Average precipitation inches (mm)	0.33 (8.4)	0.37 (9.4)	0.92 (23)	1.42 (36)	2.02 (51)	2.31 (59)	3.32 (84)	2.80 (71)	1.10 (28)	1.37 (35)	0.47 (12)	0.58 (15)	17.01 (431.8)
Average snowfall inches (cm)	3.3 (8.4)	2.1 (5.3)	3.7 (9.4)	1.3 (3.3)	0.9 (2.3)	0.0 (0.0)	0.0 (0.0)	0.0 (0.0)	0.0 (0.0)	0.9 (2.3)	1.6 (4.1)	3.1 (7.9)	16.9 (43)
Average precipitation days (≥ 0.01 in)	2.9	2.7	4.2	5.5	7.2	7.4	7.8	7.0	3.7	3.9	2.7	3.1	58.1
Average snowy days (≥ 0.1 in)	2.2	1.7	1.6	0.5	0.0	0.0	0.0	0.0	0.0	0.4	0.9	2.0	9.3
Source 1: NOAA
Source 2: National Weather Service

== Demographics ==
Historical population
Census	Pop.	Note	%±
1890	324		—
1900	460		42.0%
1910	1,126		144.8%
1920	1,059		−6.0%
1930	1,383		30.6%
1940	1,226		−11.4%
1950	2,075		69.2%
1960	1,888		−9.0%
1970	1,720		−8.9%
1980	1,654		−3.8%
1990	1,606		−2.9%
2000	1,824		13.6%
2010	1,812		−0.7%
2020	1,826		0.8%
U.S. Decennial Census

=== 2020 census ===
As of the 2020 census, Syracuse had a population of 1,826. The median age was 33.0 years. 30.1% of residents were under the age of 18 and 12.2% of residents were 65 years of age or older. For every 100 females there were 107.7 males, and for every 100 females age 18 and over there were 107.0 males age 18 and over.

0.0% of residents lived in urban areas, while 100.0% lived in rural areas.

There were 673 households in Syracuse, of which 39.2% had children under the age of 18 living in them. Of all households, 49.0% were married-couple households, 19.8% were households with a male householder and no spouse or partner present, and 26.0% were households with a female householder and no spouse or partner present. About 28.5% of all households were made up of individuals and 13.9% had someone living alone who was 65 years of age or older.

There were 773 housing units, of which 12.9% were vacant. The homeowner vacancy rate was 1.3% and the rental vacancy rate was 13.5%.

Racial composition as of the 2020 census
Race	Number	Percent
White	1,056	57.8%
Black or African American	9	0.5%
American Indian and Alaska Native	21	1.2%
Asian	3	0.2%
Native Hawaiian and Other Pacific Islander	0	0.0%
Some other race	453	24.8%
Two or more races	284	15.6%
Hispanic or Latino (of any race)	902	49.4%

Income and poverty

The 2016–2020 5-year American Community Survey estimates show that the median household income was $44,535 (with a margin of error of +/- $6,141) and the median family income $53,417 (+/- $5,039). Males had a median income of $38,684 (+/- $4,336) versus $26,165 (+/- $2,933) for females. The median income for those above 16 years old was $36,007 (+/- $2,507). Approximately, 6.9% of families and 11.5% of the population were below the poverty line, including 15.5% of those under the age of 18 and 12.1% of those ages 65 or over.

=== 2010 census ===
As of the census of 2010, there were 1,812 people, 715 households, and 460 families living in the city. The population density was 442.0 inhabitants per square mile (170.7/km^{2}). There were 832 housing units at an average density of 202.9 per square mile (78.3/km^{2}). The racial makeup of the city was 76.7% White, 0.2% African American, 1.8% Native American, 0.2% Asian, 0.1% Pacific Islander, 19.4% from other races, and 1.6% from two or more races. Hispanic or Latino of any race were 32.7% of the population.

There were 715 households, of which 37.1% had children under the age of 18 living with them, 51.6% were married couples living together, 9.0% had a female householder with no husband present, 3.8% had a male householder with no wife present, and 35.7% were non-families. 31.5% of all households were made up of individuals, and 14.3% had someone living alone who was 65 years of age or older. The average household size was 2.53 and the average family size was 3.23.

The median age in the city was 32.1 years. 28.7% of residents were under the age of 18; 9.8% were between the ages of 18 and 24; 25.5% were from 25 to 44; 22.4% were from 45 to 64; and 13.5% were 65 years of age or older. The gender makeup of the city was 50.6% male and 49.4% female.

== Education ==
The community is served by Syracuse USD 494 public school district. The Syracuse school mascot is Bulldogs.

== Gallery ==
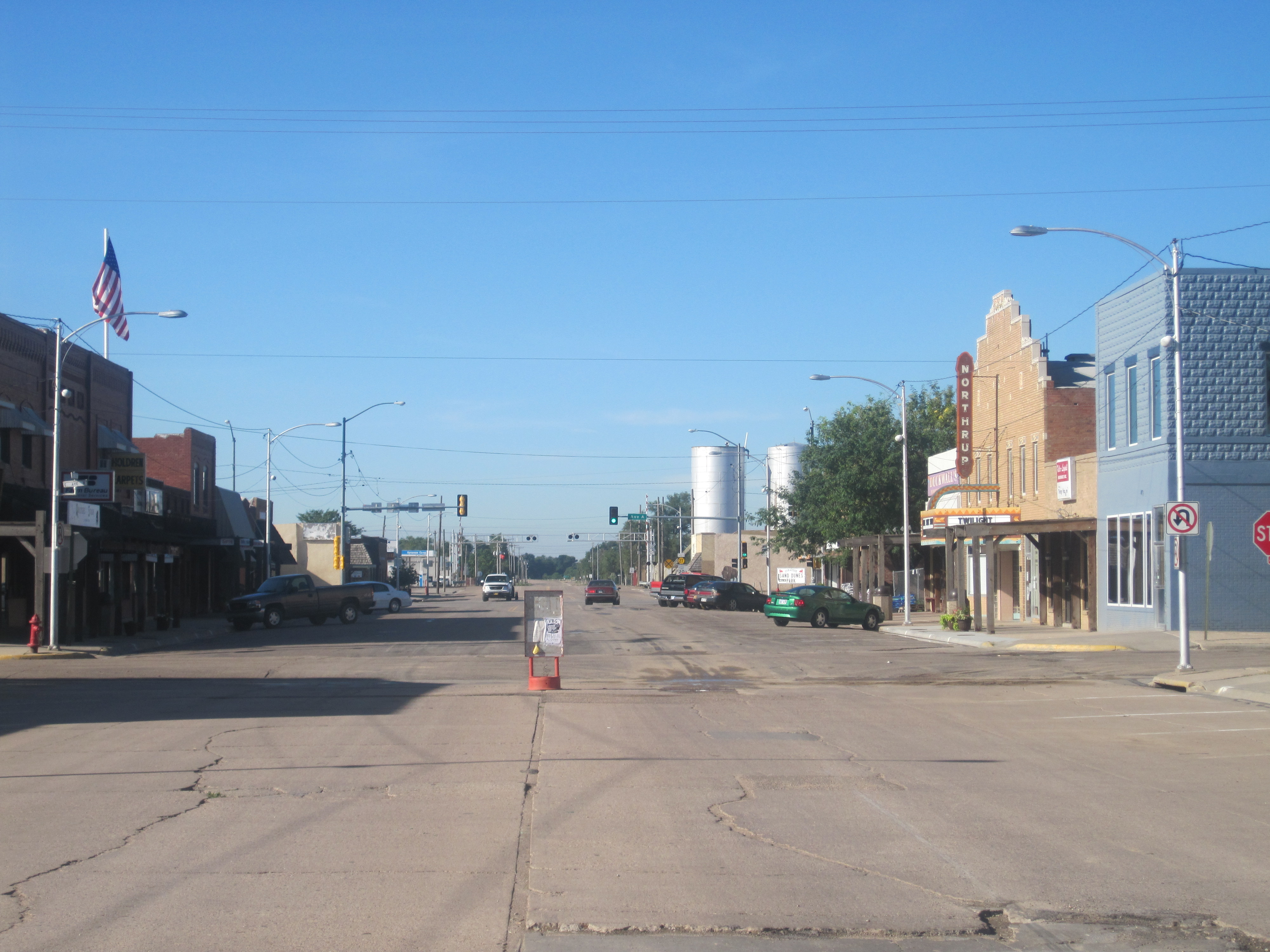
Downtown (2010)

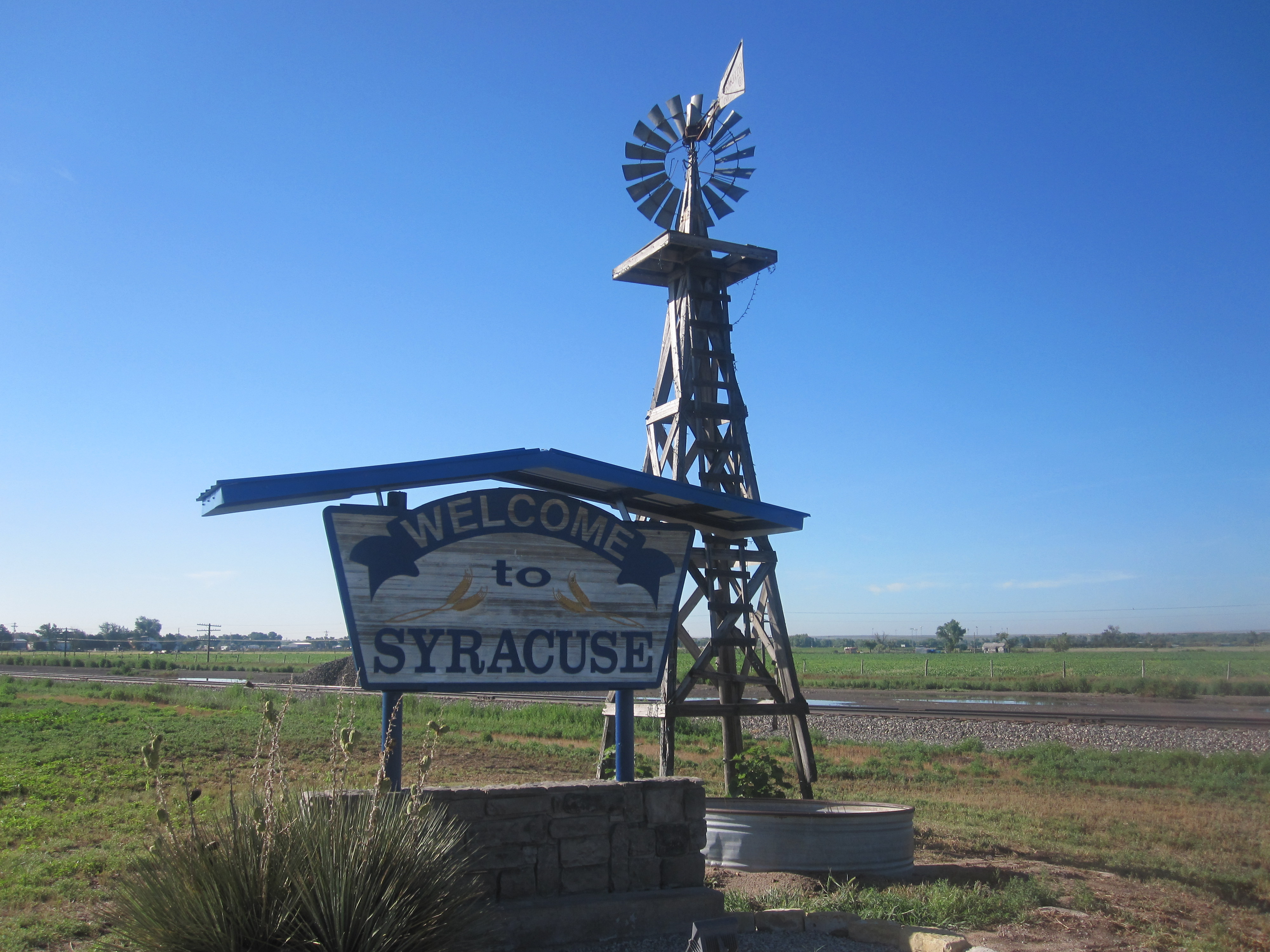
Syracuse welcome sign.

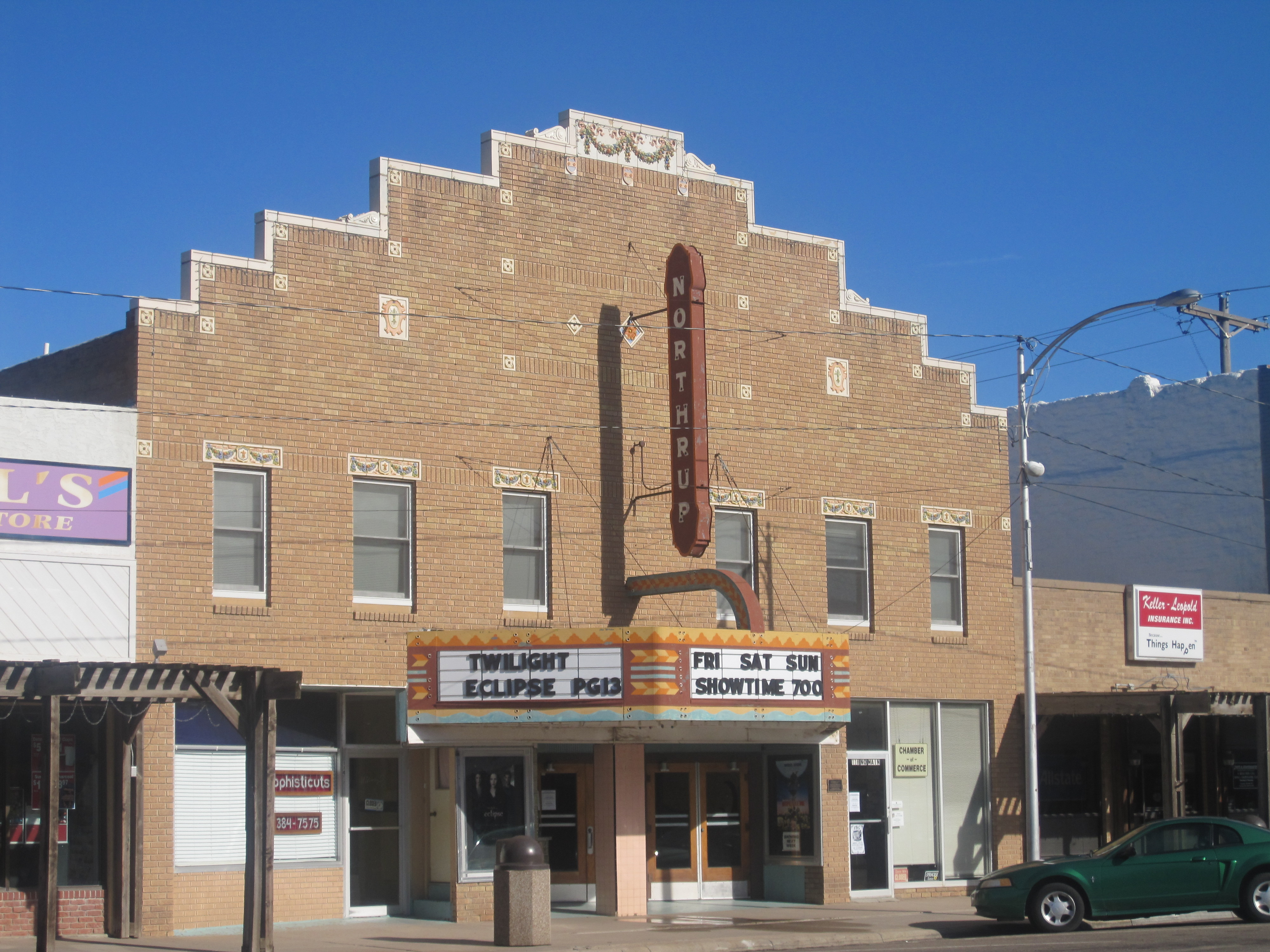
Northrup Theater in downtown Syracuse.

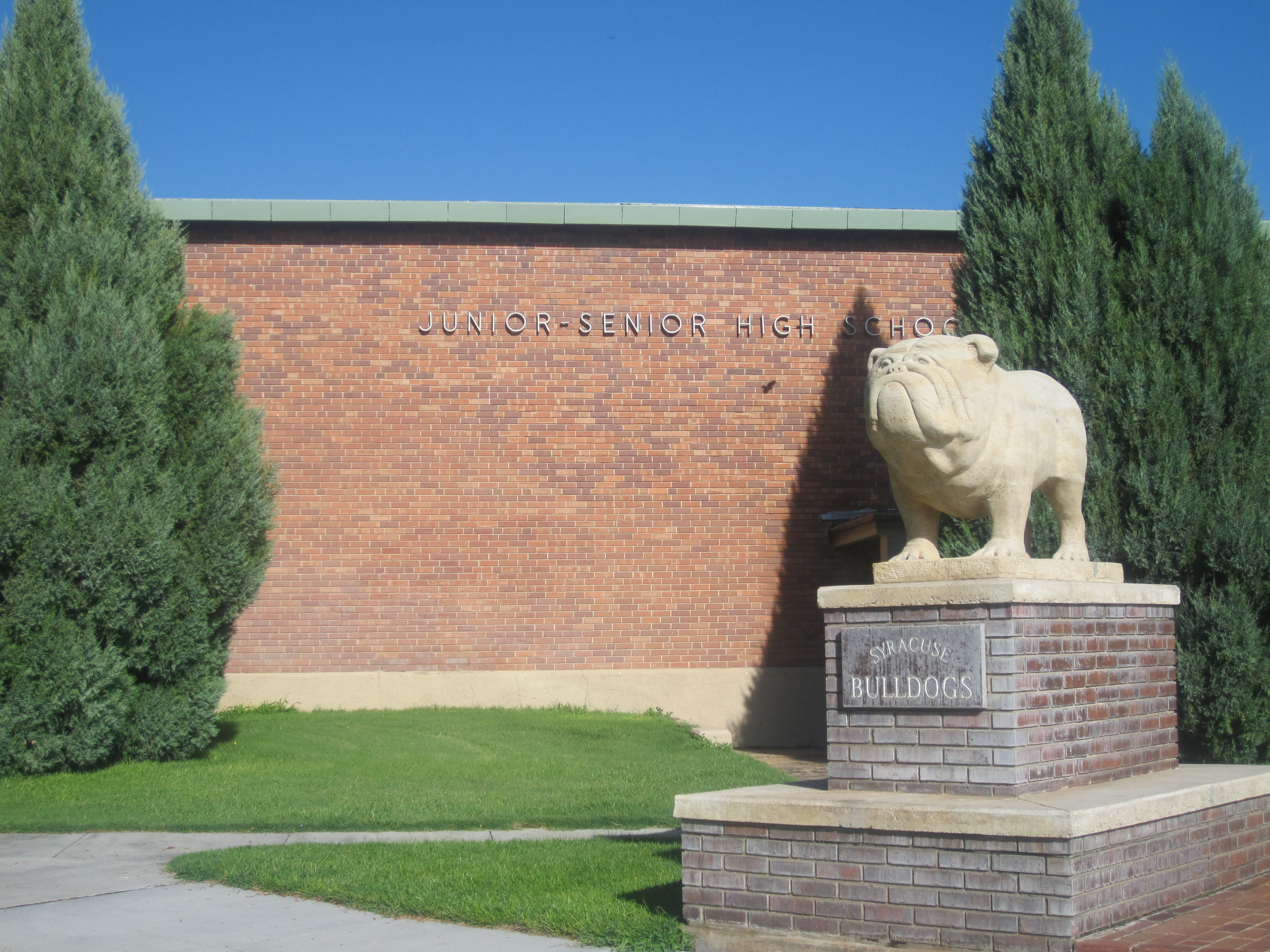
Syracuse High School Bulldog mascot.

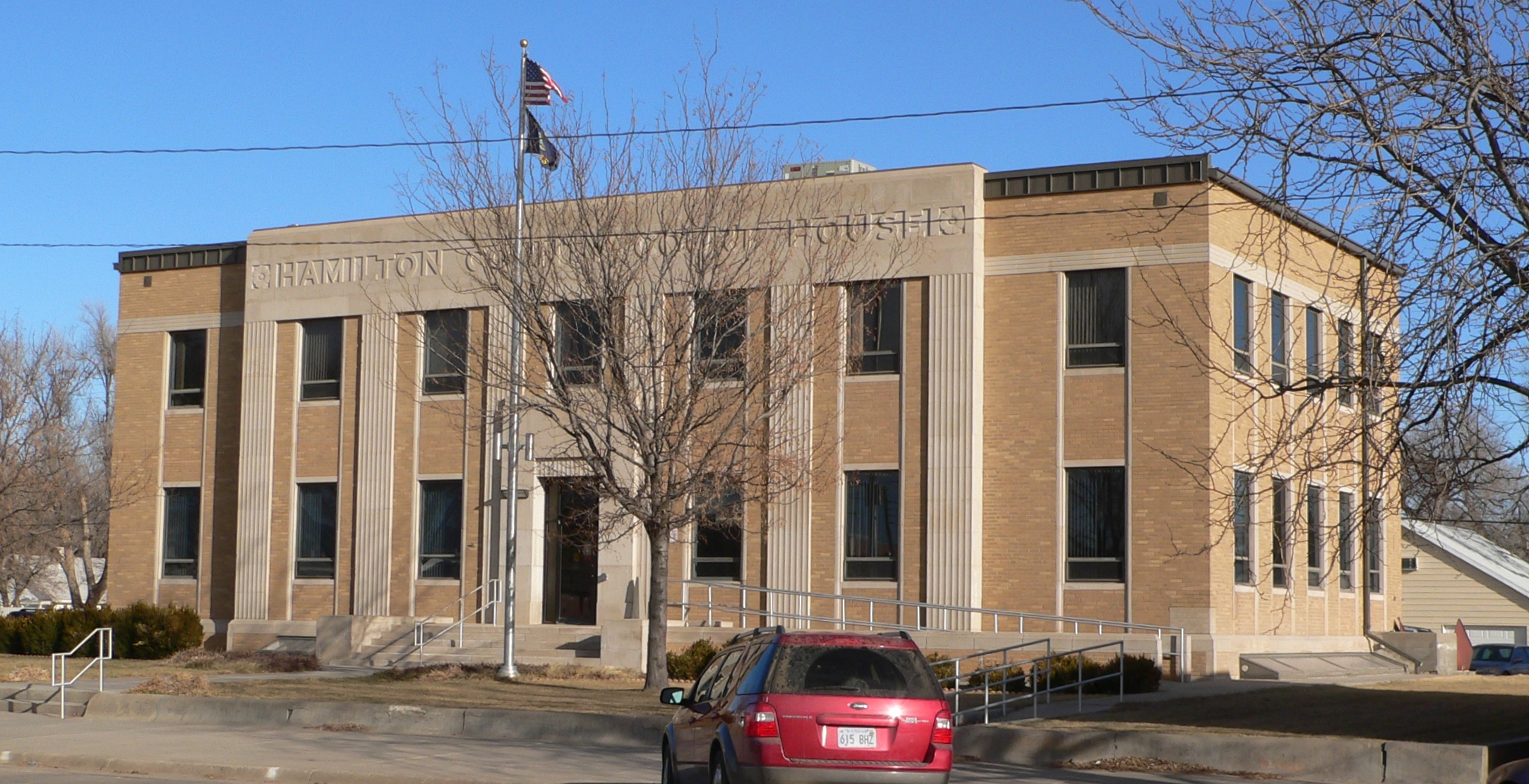
Hamilton County courthouse.

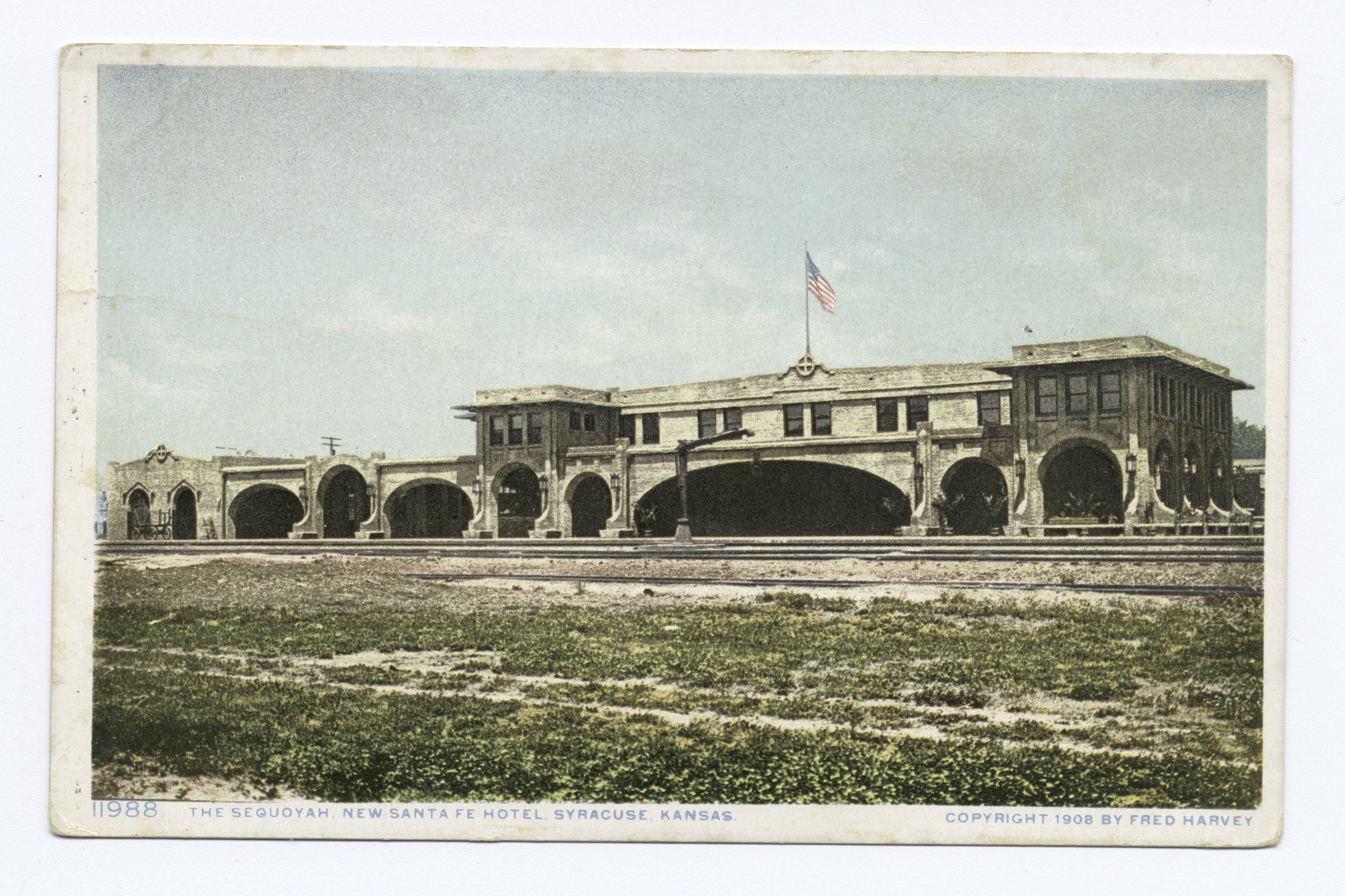
Sequoyah Hotel, early 20th century postcard

== See also ==
- Santa Fe Trail
