= Menon II of Pharsalus =

5th-century BC general in the Peloponnesian War

Menon (Ancient Greek: Μένων, fl 431 BC) commanded a faction of Pharsalians who were among the Thessalians who came to the assistance of the Athenians when they were being attacked by the Peloponnesian army in the first year of the Peloponnesian War, 431 BC. At the time, he led a cavalry that was involved in a skirmish at Phrygia. He may be the son or grandson of Menon I of Pharsalus, and he may be the grandfather of Menon III of Pharsalus (who appears in Plato's Meno), via his son Alexidemus.

== Bibliography ==
- Thucydides, History of the Peloponnesian War, Bk II, line 22
- Roland Grubb Kent, A History of Thessaly: From the Earliest Historical Times to the Ascension of Philip V. of Macedon, 1904, ch V, pp 20–21
- A Dictionary of Greek and Roman Biography and Mythology, Ed. William Smith, 1876, Vol 2 pp 1043–1044
