= Menno Sluijter =

Menno Emanuël Sluijter (31 July 1932, Haarlem – 11 August 2022) was an anaesthetist from the Netherlands.

Sluijter obtained his MD at the University of Amsterdam in 1957 and his PhD at the same institution in 1963 with the dissertation The treatment of carbon monoxide poisoning by administration of oxygen at high atmospheric pressure. He was professor of Pain Studies at the Rijksuniversiteit Limburg, the predecessor of Maastricht University.

Sluijter is credited with the development of pulsed radiofrequency treatment. He was involved in research related to chronic pain. He was also affiliated with the Jan van Goyen Clinic in Amsterdam. He has helped to work on shifting how physicians deal with long term pain from 'pain management', to 'pain treatment.'

== Sources ==
- Alexandre Teixeira MD, Menno E. Sluijter MD, PhD (2006): Intradiscal High-Voltage, Long-Duration Pulsed Radiofrequency for Discogenic Pain: A Preliminary Report. Pain Medicine 7 (5), pages 424–428.
